= Regency (greyhounds) =

British greyhound competition

The Regency
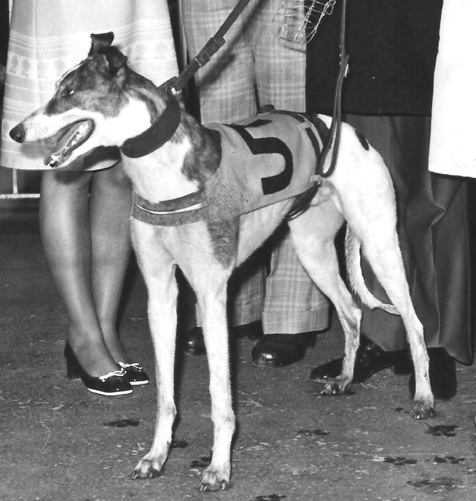
- Glin Bridge, 1975 champion
- Class: Category 1
- Location: Brighton & Hove Greyhound Stadium
- Inaugurated: 1948
- Sponsor: Premier Greyhound Racing

Race information
- Distance: 695 metres
- Surface: Sand
- Purse: £20,000 (winner)

The Regency is a greyhound competition held at Brighton & Hove Greyhound Stadium. It was inaugurated in 1948 and was originally a competition for British Bred Greyhounds only before switching to all-comers. The event originally called the Regency Produce Stakes immediately attracted interest with 161 British Bred litters in the first year and over 200 litters in the 1949 edition and has remained a significant event.

From 1966 the competition dropped the Produce part from its name because the event was extended to all greyhounds and a new perpetual trophy was introduced.

The competition is a category 1 event on the annual greyhound racing calendar. In 2022, the event was sponsored by Premier Greyhound Racing an it doubled in prize money with a £20,000 winner's purse.

== Venues and distances ==
- 1948–1965 (Hove 525y)
- 1966–1974 (Hove 725y)
- 1975–1977 (Hove 670m)
- 1978–1980 (Hove 680m)
- 1981–1995 (Hove 740m)
- 1996–2003 (Hove 695m)
- 2004–2005 (Hove 515m)
- 2006–present (Hove 695m)

== Past winners ==
Year	Winner	Breeding	Trainer	Time (sec)	SP	Notes/ref
1948	Bunnys Hoard	Lord Lieutenant - White Pebbles	Gunner Smith (Private)	29.83	4/1	
1949	Kings Signature	Burhill Moon - Grosvenor Faith	R G Mackay (Brighton)	29.49	4/1	Track record
1950	Kennel Sport	Kampion Sailor - Blarney Lone Beauty	Harry Buck (White City - London)	29.39	3/1	
1951	Gay Rimmell	Rimmells Black - Bewitching Gay Gem	Johnny Bullock (West Ham)	30.04	14/1	
1952	Ranjies Humoresque	Fair And Handsome - Doreen Machree	Jeremiah O'Hea (Park Royal)	29.45	8/1	
1953	Kensington Perfection	Black Invasion - Lambourn Firefly	Bill Higgins (Oxford)	29.56	5/2	
1954	Box Hedge	Eastern Madness - Be Happy	Gunner Smith (Brighton)	29.57	3/1	
1955	Kensington Bramble	Black Invasion - Lambourn Firefly	Marjorie Phipps (Private)	29.46	4/1	
1956	Barnaby Rudge	Ballylanigan Tanist - Bargain Hunter	Gunner Smith (Brighton)	29.39	11/2	
1957	Highwood Sovereign	Westbourne - Pretty Miss Amber	Leslie Reynolds (Wembley)	29.14	4/5f	
1958	Entre Nous	Step Inside - Ryton Bogota	Ron Chamberlain (Private)	29.59	9/2	
1959	Ford Scud	Polonuis Harrow - Glamour	Fred Taylor (White City - London)	29.98	7/2	
1960	Mr Watt	Prince Of Bermuda - Ford Squib	Gunner Smith (Brighton)	29.60	3/1	
1961	Luxury Liner	Northern King - Brazen Hussy	Gunner Smith (Brighton)	29.65	2/5f	
1962	Royal Ace	Barrowside - Lottbridge Princess	Dennis Hannafin (Wimbledon)	29.63	16/1	
1963	Tripaway	Low Pressure - High Flight	Vivien Pateman (Private)	28.81	8/1	
1964	Chittering Cheapjack	Noted Crusader - Chittering Cindy	Adam Jackson (Clapton)	29.32	1/1f	
1965	Warley	Low Pressure - Heron Of The Marshes	Mrs D Plowden (Private)	28.86	13/8	
1966	Ardvullen	Printers Prince - Balbec Fire	Mrs E Eade (Private)	40.71	15/8f	
1967	Ever Work	Jungle Worker - New Forever	George Curtis (Brighton)	40.95	2/1	
1968	Steer Me Home	Oregon Prince - Hi Castle	Nora Gleeson (Wimbledon)	41.35	9/2	
1969	Shady Begonia	Pigalle Wonder - Castle Swan	Norman Oliver (Brough Park)	40.51	1/2f	
1970	Glory Crazy	Crazy Parachute - Glory Flash	Phil Rees Sr. (Wimbledon)	40.88	11/4	
1971	Specfire	Spectre - Lils Picture	Paddy McEvoy (Wimbledon)	40.88	4/5f	
1972	Adamstown Lane	Spectre - Arklow Fire	Gordon Hodson (White City - London)	40.82	4/1	
1973	Pepper Joe	Shanes Legacy - Kirbys Turn	Charlie Coyle (Private)	40.81	10/11f	
1974	Chain Gang	Monalee Champion - No Mabel	Frank Melville (Harringay)	40.05	5/2	
1975	Glin Bridge	Spectre - Shore Susie	George Curtis (Brighton)	40.19	1/2f	
1976	Westmead Champ	Westmead Power - Hacksaw	Pam Heasman (Hackney)	39.78	13/8	Track record
1977	Bonzo	Silver Record - Clane Flint	George Curtis (Brighton)	40.03	9/2	
1978	Ballinamona Sam	Short Interview - White Trapper	John Horsfall (Catford)	41.74	11/8f	
1979	Jingling Star	Glin Bridge - Some Laugh	Gunner Smith (Brighton)	40.62	5/2	
1980	Garbally Magpie	Tullig Doctor - Flying Pixie	Ernie Gaskin Sr. (Private)	43.78	5/2	
1981	Fluffylugs	Glin Bridge - Some Laugh	Gunner Smith (Brighton)	46.84	25/1	
1982	Paradise Lost	Paradise Spectre - Gerards Sally	Gunner Smith (Brighton)	44.65	20/1	Track record
1983	Aquila Bay	Langford Dacoit - Carry On Hillary	Colin Barwick (Private)	47.41	6/1	
1984	Mac's Jeanie	Bobcol - Bellini	Gunner Smith (Brighton)	45.41	9/2	
1985	Scurlogue Champ	Sand Man - Old Rip	Ken Peckham (Ipswich)	45.20	8/15f	
1986	Yankees Shadow	Cosmic Sailor - Kings Lace	George Curtis (Brighton)	46.03	8/1	
1987	Yankees Shadow	Cosmic Sailor - Kings Lace	Bill Masters (Hove)	45.28	1/2f	
1988	Silver Mask	Easy And Slow - Flora Breeda	Bill Masters (Hove)	46.07	3/1	
1989	Manx Sky	Easy And Slow – Darian Ivy	Ernie Gaskin Sr. (Private)	44.98	5/4f	
1990	Sail On Valerie	Sail On II – Princeton Darkie	Ernie Gaskin Sr. (Private)	44.45	2/1jf	
1991	Bobs Regan	Ballyregan Bob – Sandy Gem	Brian Timcke (Private)	45.05	6/4f	
1992	Integrity Boy	Kilmeedy King – Yellow Riband	Derek Knight (Hove)	44.74	4/1	
1993	Trans Domino	Dukes Lodge – Trans Linda	Maldwyn Thomas (Reading)	44.44	6/4f	
1994	Decoy Cougar	Slaneyside Hare – Easy Bimbo	Pam Cobbold (Private)	45.00	6/4f	
1995	Suncrest Sail	Low Sail – Sarahs Surprise	Charlie Lister OBE (Private)	44.26	1/20f	
1996	Restless Lass	Slaneyside Hare – Buzz Off Gypsy	Brian Clemenson (Hove)	42.40	7/4f	
1997	Million Percent	Frightful Flash – Ladys Guest	Brian Clemenson (Hove)	41.69	10/11f	
1998	Honest Lord	Coalbrook Tiger – Get Plaid	Lee Gifkins (Private)	41.27	4/1	
1999	Knappogue Oak	Frightful Flash – Dartfield Lass	Ken Bebbington (Monmore)	41.60	8/15f	
2000	Solid Magic	Iceni Regent – Clodeen Magic	Brian Clemenson (Hove)	41.76	4/7f	
2001	Killeacle Phoebe	Smooth Rumble – Blonde Returns	Brian Clemenson (Hove)	41.28	6/4jf	
2002	Dunbarton Cross	Toms The Best – Dunbarton Legend	Wayne Wrighting (Hove)	41.20	9/2	
2003	Soviet Gypsy	Mountleader Peer – Soviet Atlantic	Ernie Gaskin Sr. (Walthamstow)	41.32	3/1	
2004	Normandy Boy	Doc Burns – Lenbrin Lucy	Maria Collins (Hove)	29.95	3/1	
2005	Jordans Glory	Hondo Black – After Glory	Alison Ingram (Romford)	30.00	3/1cf	
2006	Caloona Striker	Toms the Best – Caloona Move	Wayne Wrighting (Hove)	40.82	4/7f	
2007	Spiridon Louis	Droopys Vieri – Early Flight	Lorraine Sams (Crayford)	41.30	6/4f	
2008	Flying Winner	Flying Penske – Wise Winner	Chris Lund Doncaster	40.95	11/10f	
2009	Lorrys Options	Westmead Hawk – Droopys Seville	Dean Childs (Private)	44.48	1/5f	
2010	He Went Whoosh	Brett Lee – Arun Sky	Claude Gardiner (Hove)	41.26	7/1	
2011	Blonde Fletch	Black Shaw – Glebe Stapler	Mark Wallis (Yarmouth)	41.21	8/11f	
2012	Mr Chow	Droopys Scolari – Flying Winner	Chris Lund Doncaster	41.03	5/2	
2013	Fear Emoski	Top Honcho – Kildallon Maid	Charlie Lister OBE (Private)	41.35	4/5f	
2014	Boltatwelldigger	Hondo Black – Coras Fancy	Wayne Wrighting (Hove)	41.60	25/1	
2015	Touch Tackle	Ace Hi Rumble – Droopys Start	Jim Daly (Sittingbourne)	41.18	5/4f	
2016	Billys Bullet	Ace Hi Rumble – Droopys Start	Mark Wallis (Towcester)	41.31	4/1	
2017	Tyrap Dragi	Head Bound – Varra Lark	Jason Heath (Hove)	41.94	8/1	
2018	Clares Kyletaun	Ballyana Foxtrot – Lughill Marie	June Harvey (Swindon)	41.05	1/2f	
2019	Aayamza Breeze	Aero Majestic – Kiltrea Ally	Mark Wallis (Henlow)	41.42	8/1	
2020	Zascandil	Vulturi – Scissors	Kevin Boon (Yarmouth)	41.74	7/2	
2021	Aayamza Royale	Ballymac Eske – Ascot Lydia	Mark Wallis (Henlow)	41.56	11/4	
2022	Troy Suzieeq	Kinloch Brae – Redzer Ruby	David Mullins (Romford)	42.14	28/1	
2023	Space Jet	Droopys Jet – Volcano	Matt Dartnall (Oxford)	41.69	2/1jf	
2024	Baywatch Bullet	Droopys Sydney – Blundel Spark	Belinda Green (Hove)	41.51	7/1	
2025	Mongys Wild	Roxholme Olaf – Banter Breeze	Mark Wallis (Private)	41.19	1/4f	

== Sponsors ==
- 2002–2002 (Trap6.com)
- 2003–2003 (Rendezvous Casino)
- 2004–2021 (Coral)
- 2022–present (Premier Greyhound Racing)
