= Brighton Belle (greyhounds) =

British greyhound racing competition

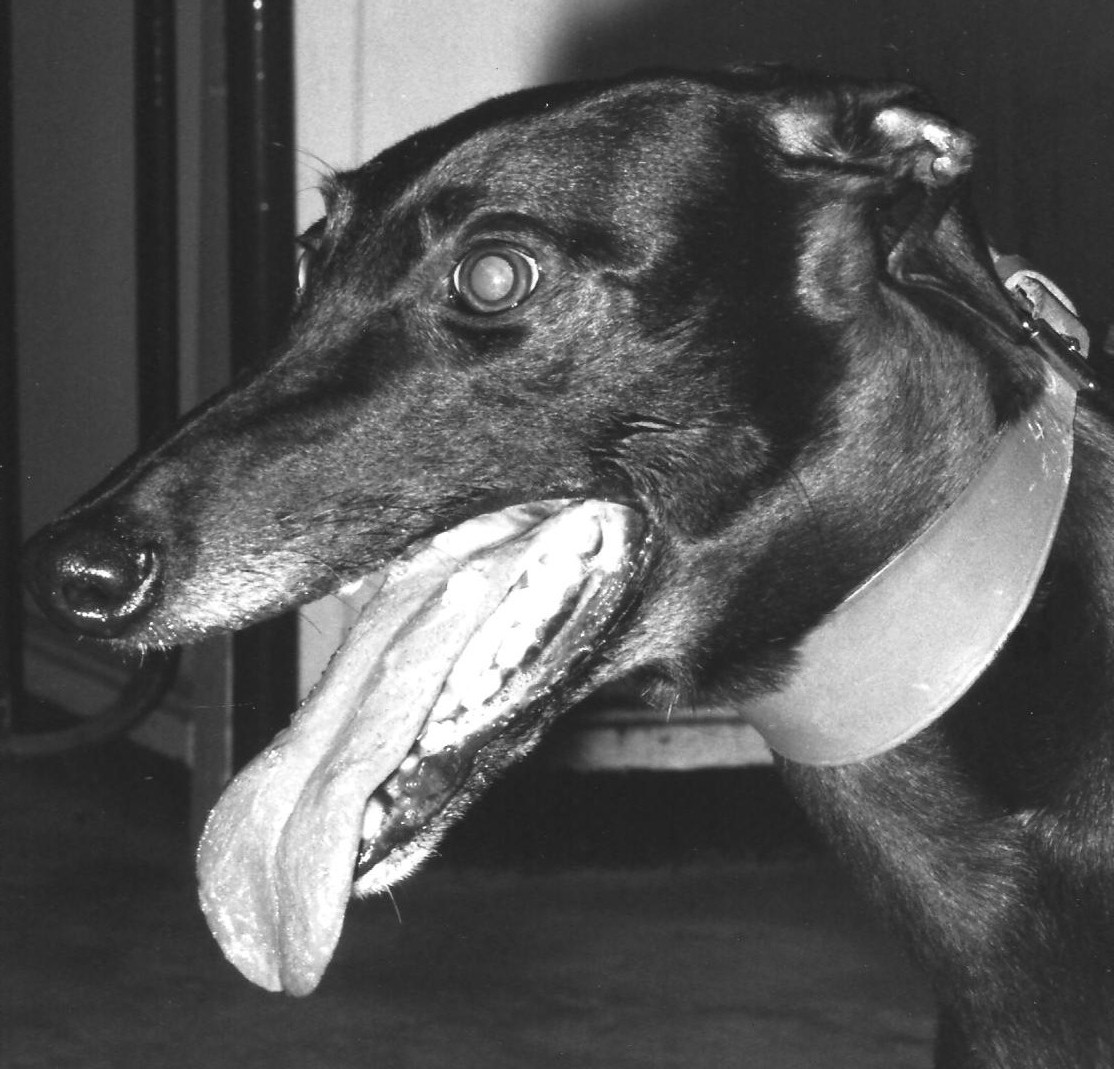
- Westmead Move, 1987 champion
- Class: Category 2
- Location: Brighton & Hove Greyhound Stadium
- Inaugurated: 1975
- Sponsor: Coral

Race information
- Distance: 515 metres
- Surface: Sand
- Purse: £10,000 (winner)

The Brighton Belle is a greyhound racing competition held annually. It was inaugurated in 1975 at Brighton & Hove Greyhound Stadium.

== Venues ==
1975–present (Hove 515m)

== Sponsors ==
- 1991–1991 (Worcester Control)
- 2001–2001 (Racing Post)
- 2002–2002 (Isonetric Broadband)
- 2006–2007 (Roy Pook)
- 2008–present (Coral)

== Past winners ==
Year	Winner	Breeding	Trainer	Time (sec)	SP	Notes/ref
1975	Final Flag	Hack Up Fenian – Penny Biscuit	George Curtis (Brighton)	29.80	9/4	
1976	Kings Comet	Cobbler – Robins Silver	Jack Smith (Catford)	29.56	5/1	
1977	Kilcanway Rose	Itsachampion – Kals Idol	Tom Johnston Jr. (Wembley)	29.67	3/1	
1978	Loyal Katie	Loyal Expert – Merry Pixie	John Honeysett (Crayford)	29.82	4/1	
1979	Masslock Lady	Gayline – Masslock Queen	George Curtis (Brighton)	29.14	11/10f	
1980	Sunny Interval	Itasachampion – Cloheadon Pussy	Phil Rees Jr. (Wimbledon)	29.56	6/1	
1981	Creepy Tulip	Shamrock Sailor – Creepy Band	Phil Rees Jr. (Wimbledon)	30.35	11/4	
1982	Sundridge Racing	Ivy Hall Solo – Rathduff Gazelle	Tony Dennis (Southend)	30.10	1/1f	
1983	Blue Total	Liberty Lad – Ice Camp	Nora Gleeson (Wimbledon)	30.45	8/1	
1984	Rushwee Pecos	Pecos Jerry – Rushwee Era	George Curtis (Hove)	30.35	5/2	
1985	Lisas Girl	Maplehurst Star – Tyrean	Philip Rees Jr. (Wimbledon)	30.16	15/8f	
1986	Soft Lips	Sand Black – Black Pigeon	George Curtis (Hove)	30.37	6/1	
1987	Westmead Move	Whisper Wishes – Westmead Tania	Nick Savva (Private)	29.79	1/4f	
1988	Coppertone	Westmead Milos – Loopy Lil	Gary Baggs (Walthamstow)	30.21	3/1	
1989	Greenfield Madam	Cathys Fugitive – Greenfield Chick	Paddy Coughlan (Crayford)	30.22	4/11f	
1990	Westmead Chloe	Flashy Sir – Westmead Seal	Nick Savva (Private)	30.71	7/1	
1991	Satharn Lady	Satharn Beo – Long Valley Lady	John Coleman (Walthamstow)	30.01	7/4f	
1992	Roving Trumpet	Echo Trumpet – Roving Linda	John Rouse (Hove)	30.22	3/1	
1993	Wexford Minx	Manorville Magic – Ballarue Suzie	Derek Knight (Hove)	30.32	6/1	
1994	Westmead Chick	Im Slippy – Westmead Move	Nick Savva (Private)	29.86	4/7f	
1995	Sydney Miss	Murlens Slippy – Nans Brute	Bill Masters (Hove)	30.55	11/8f	
1996	Mountain Hope	Leaders Best – Mountain Special	Bob Young (Hove)	30.22	6/1	
1997	Droopys Trisha	Murlens Slippy – Droopys Aine	Chris Duggan (Walthamstow)	30.38	3/1	
1998	She Can Boogie	Come On Ranger – Danielle Delight	Ben McBride (Harlow)	30.43	3/1	
1999	Im Okay	Cry Dalcash – Farloe Post	Barrie Draper (Sheffield)	29.96	1/3f	
2000	Danielles Minx	Daleys Denis – Ballarue Minx	Derek Knight (Hove)	30.03	14/1	
2001	Senahel Ridge	Spiral Nikita – Senahel Gold	Owen McKenna (Wimbledon)	29.97	3/1	
2002	Droopys Candice	Come On Ranger – Droopys Chloe	Gary Sallis (Reading)	29.85	3/1	
2003	Carn Breeze	Top Honcho – Carn Mistress	Chris Lund (Stainforth)	29.62	3/1	
2004	Droopys Savanna	Jamaican Hero – Droopys Spice	Brian Clemenson (Hove)	29.93	11/4f	
2005	Shelbourne Nina	Knockeevan Star – Expert View	Brian Clemenson (Hove)	29.77	5/4f	
2006	Lady Sky	Droopys Woods – Bower Tina	Brian Clemenson (Hove)	29.81	5/2	
2007	Jazz Hurricane	Top Honcho – Lucy May	Derek Knight (Hove)	30.33	4/5f	
2008	Farloe Mirror	Droopys Maldini – Farloe Oyster	Claude Gardiner (Hove)	29.94	9/2	
2009	Pine Isle	Premier County – Westmead Pine	Claude Gardiner (Hove)	30.01	5/4	
2010	Paradise Alexus	Hondo Black – Paradise Alanna	Brian Clemenson (Hove)	29.76	4/1	
2011	Westmead Melanie	Droopys Maldini – Mega Delight	Nick Savva (Private)	29.92	1/1f	
2012	Jaytee Monroe	Kinloch Brae-Dundooan Diva	Paul Young (Romford)	29.92	7/2	
2013	Bridge Ruth	Hondo Black – Forest Baby	Mark Wallis (Yarmouth)	29.54	1/2f	
2014	Butts Mott	Archaton Pine – Ardera Spice	Patricia Cowdrill (Monmore)	29.93	2/1	
2015	Airforce Duchess	Definate Opinion – Ranchers Star	Mark Wallis (Towcester)	29.91	5/1	
2016	Banabane	Droopys Scolari – Ballymac Razl	Seamus Cahill (Hove)	29.69	4/5f	
2017	Away Shelly	Droopys Jet – Danielles Shelly	Matt Dartnall (Towcester)	29.85	5/4f	
2018	Ballymac Miscula	Ballymac Matt – Moyar Kite	Kim Billingham (Monmore)	30.00	2/1	
2019	Galloping Moon	Tullymurry Act – Galloping Maeve	Kevin Hutton (Monmore)	30.22	6/4f	
2020	Droopys Aoife	Droopys Sydney – Droopys Hilda	Ernest Gaskin Jr. (Private)	31.48	13/8	
2021	Lights Out	Taylors Sky – Terminator	Kevin Hutton (Towcester)	30.28	9/4	
2022	Whats Up Eva	Laughil Blake – Snow Acorn	Richard Rees (Brighton)	30.32	2/1	
2023	Betsys Bullet	Droopys Sydney – Ballymac Razzler	Belinda Green (Brighton)	30.29	11/1	
2024	Queen Joni	Droopys Sydney – Queen Jessiej	Liz McNair (Central Park)	30.30	7/4	
2025	Runaway Dior	Droopys Sydney – Crokers Princess	Paul Donovan (Central Park)	30.19	8/1	
