= Sussex Cup =

Greyhound racing competition in England

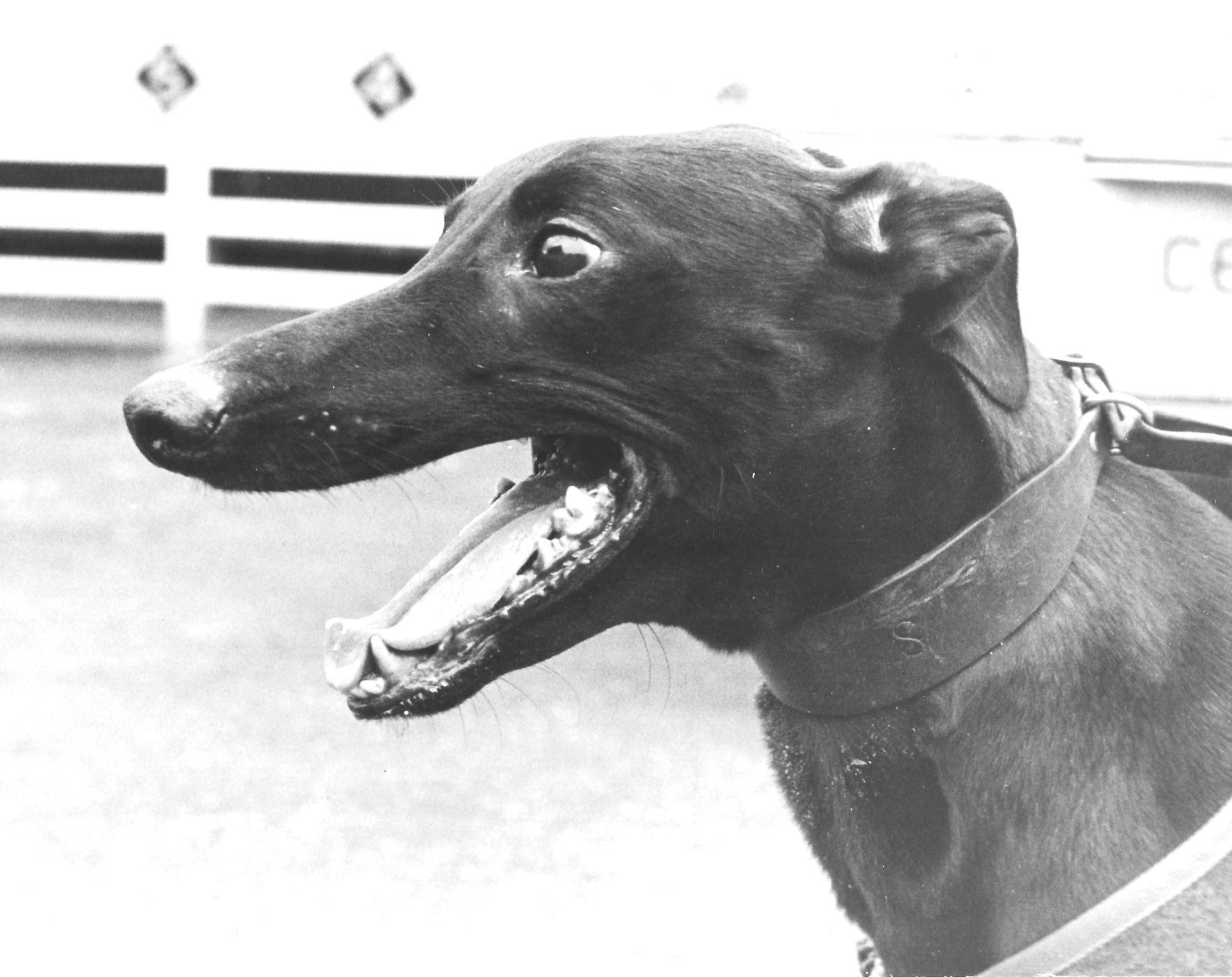
- The 1986 winner, house Hunter
- Class: Category 1
- Location: Brighton & Hove Greyhound Stadium
- Inaugurated: 1972
- Sponsor: Coral Bookmakers

Race information
- Distance: 515 metres
- Surface: Sand
- Purse: £10,000 (winner)

The Sussex Cup is a greyhound racing competition held annually at Brighton & Hove Greyhound Stadium.

It was inaugurated in 1972 and is a category 1 event on the annual racing calendar.

== Venues and distances ==
- 1972–present (Hove 515m)

== Sponsors ==
- 1998–2004 (Chas Miller Bookmakers)
- 2005–present (Coral)

== Past winners ==
Year	Winner	Breeding	Trainer	Time (sec)	SP	Notes
1972	Come On Hasty	Silver Hope - Silver Oregon	Clare Orton (Wimbledon)	28.32	15/8f	
1973	Mickey Finn	Monalee Champion - Spring Shower	Paddy Milligan (Private)	28.65	5/4f	
1974	Clear Reason	Quiet Spring - Regal Queen	Mrs Dorin Clark (Private)	28.47	2/1f	
1975	Abbey Glade	Kilbeg Kuda - Abbey Groves	George Curtis (Brighton)	29.63	7/2	
1976	Gaily Noble	Monalee Champion - Noble Lynn	John Coleman (Wembley)	29.55	10/1	
1977	Linacre	Lively Band - Certral	Ted Dickson (Walthamstow)	28.99	4/6f	Track record
1978	Sandpiper Dolly	Broadford Boy - Dolores Rocket	John Honeysett (Crayford)	29.52	9/1	
1979	Mondays Bran	Brave Bran - Mainly Personal	Phil Rees Jr. (Wimbledon)	28.96	2/1	Track record
1980	Maplehurst Star	Tullig Rambler - Sparks Star	George Curtis (Brighton)	29.21	10/3	
1981	Black Armour	Tullig Doctor - Flying Pixie	Jenny March (Ipswich)	30.04	2/1f	
1982	Yankee Express	Pecos Jerry - Kings Comet	George Curtis (Brighton)	30.06	4/5f	
1983	The Jolly Norman	Knockrour Brandy - Breeze Valley	George Curtis (Brighton)	30.31	3/1	
1984	Sammy Bear	Mexican Chief - Lady Laurdella	George Curtis (Brighton)	29.98	5/1	
1985	Links Way	Hurry On Bran - Giglis Fancy	Ray Peacock (Harringay)	29.95	9/4	
1986	House Hunter	Tiger Jazz - Brass Tacks	Gunner Smith (Brighton)	29.97	9/4	
1987	Sambuca	Pat Seamur - Lyons Flora	Gunner Smith (Brighton)	29.83	1/1f	
1988	Hit The Lid	Soda Fountain - Cailin Dubh	John McGee Sr. (Private)	29.73	8/11f	Track record
1989	Slippy Blue	I'm Slippy - Valoris	Kenny Linzell (Walthamstow)	29.95	2/5f	
1990	Phantom Flash	Flashy Sir - Westmead Seal	Nick Savva (Milton Keynes)	30.00	2/5f	
1991	Lyons Monks	The Other Risk - Mountkeeffe Lady	John Coleman (Walthamstow)	29.91	5/4f	
1992	Parquet Patch	Kyle Jack - Ballinderry Sand	Arthur Hitch (Wimbledon)	29.96	9/2	
1994	Unique Bay	Castlelyons Gem - Kenmare Bay	Linda Mullins (Walthamstow)	29.98	7/2	
1997	Toms The Best	Frightful Flash - Ladys Guest	Nick Savva (Walthamstow)	29.79	2/5f	
1998	Astrosyn Eulogy	Come On Ranger - Annies Bar	Derek Knight (Hove)	30.10	5/4f	
1999	Curley Tresa	Phantom Flash - Campeche	Nick Savva (Milton Keynes)	29.92	5/1	
2000	Smoking Bullet	Joyful Tidings – Aggies Vixen	Derek Knight (Hove)	30.00	9/4f	
2001	Micks Best Hero	Top Honcho – Micks Best Girl	Brian Clemenson (Hove)	29.57	4/6f	
2002	Lozzas Dream	He Knows – Jumbos Moth	Derek Knight (Hove)	29.72	7/2	
2003	Toms Little Jo	Toms The Best – Westmead Josie	Gary Baggs (Walthamstow)	29.70	3/1	
2004	Ballybrazil Hero	Carlton Bale – Tycoon Kay	Brian Clemenson (Hove)	29.88	3/1	
2005	Ballymac Pires	Knockeevan Star – Blonde Returns	Carly Philpott (Private)	29.87	7/4f	
2006	Shelbourne Poopa	Kiowa Sweet Trey – Dalcash Eva	Brian Clemenson (Hove)	30.01	6/1	
2007	Barnfield on Air	Pacific Mile – Always on Air	Sam Poots (Private)	29.30	2/5f	Track record
2008	Droopys Carvalho	Droopys Maldini – Droopys Beauty	John Mullins (Yarmouth)	29.46	7/4	
2009	Raithby Syrah	Dutchys Angel – Staceys Delight	Claude Gardiner (Hove)	29.66	10/1	
2010	Head Iton Ellis	Hondo Black – Caressing	Steve Race (Private)	29.47	9/2	
2011	Longwood Days	Crash – Mt Leinster Beck	Colin Callow (Private)	29.76	8/1	
2012	Westmead Maldini	Droopys Maldini – Mega Delight	Nick Savva (Private)	29.65	9/2	
2013	Loughteen Blanco	Droopys Scolari – Loughteen Lassie	Seamus Cahill (Hove)	29.58	10/1	
2014	Exocet	Head Bound – Slip Road	Chris Allsopp (Monmore)	29.55	2/1f	
2015	Ballymac Mossjoe	Ballymac Vic – Bawna Elsa	Barrie Draper (Sheffield)	29.45	4/1	
2016	Barricane Tiger	Razldazl Jayfkay – Dirt Bird	Patrick Janssens (Towcester)	29.79	8/1	
2017	Shaneboy Freddie	Oaks Road – Shaneboy Sophia	Kevin Boon (Yarmouth)	29.94	9/2	
2018	Sporting Dave	Ballymac Vic – Sporting Dame	Seamus Cahill (Hove)	29.79	5/4	
2019	Droopys Gold	Loughteen Blanco – Droopys Force	Seamus Cahill (Hove)	29.65	1/1f	
2020	Bockos Doomie	Droopys Jet – Dalcash Kalade	Patrick Janssens (Central Park)	29.69	1/1f	
2021	Drumcrow Brent	Droopys Sydney – Drumcrow Kylie	Mark Wallis (Henlow)	29.89	5/1	
2022	Ninja Kerry	Droopys Jet – Ninja Penny	Belinda Green (Hove)	30.26	9/2	
2023	Candolim Monsoon	Magical Bale – Maireads Shauna	Derek Knight (Hove)	29.62	2/1	
2024	Newinn Benni	Droopys Sydney – Newinn Cuckoo	Derek Knight (Hove)	29.75	8/1	
2025	Proper Heiress	Droopys Sydney – Powerful Mush	Mark Wallis (Private)	29.64	4/9f	
