= Cobb Marathon Bowl =

- Location: Catford Stadium
- Inaugurated: 1942
- Final run: 1975

Race information
- Distance: 790 metres

The Cobb Marathon Bowl was a greyhound racing competition held at Catford Stadium.

It was a leading competition run over the longer marathon race distance and was inaugurated in 1942 over 810 yards.

The event was introduced by a Catford greyhound owner called Mr Francis Rupert Victor Cobb (a brewer by trade). He died in 1966 which led to the race also being known as a memorial race.

The race was discontinued in 1975 because other marathon events such as the TV Trophy surpassed it in regard to importance.

== Past winners ==
Year	Winner	Breeding	Trainer	Time	SP
1942	Castledown Prince	Castledown Lad – Walking Peggy	Paddy Fortune (Wimbledon)	49.69	6-1
1943	Patty Dear		Stan Biss (Private)	50.61	4-7f
1944	Unwin Beauty		Stan Biss (Clapton)	50.98	11-4
1945	Handsome and Fair		Stanley Biss (Clapton)	50.99	2-1
1946	Keep Sake	Glen Ranger – Grosvenor Faith	G Scadgell (Private)	51.97	10-1
1947	Missouri		Fred Farey (Private)	49.36	4-1
1948	Moral Hostess		Stanley Biss (Clapton)	51.57	8-11f
1949	Santolina	Gala Flash – Spring Flower	L Hague (White City, Manchester)	49.62	1-2f
1950	Santolina	Gala Flash – Spring Flower	Leslie Reynolds (Wembley)	51.04	1-2f
1951	Beautys Prince		Jeremiah O'Hea (Park Royal)	50.11	4-6f
1952	Bear Hug	Burhill Moon – Black Hussey	Fred Lugg (Brighton)	50.39	11-8jf
1953	Rimmells Pearl	Rimmells Black – Brissies Val	Jim Hookway (Owlerton)	48.65	11-10f
1954	Lizette	Master Captain – Dorothy Ann	Paddy Fortune (Wimbledon)	49.93	1-2f
1955	Magenta James	Jeffs Pal – Avra Marvel	R Mackay (Catford)	50.73	13-2
1956	Victory Endless	Endless Gossip – Hanslope Joan	Gordon Nicholson (Clapton)	49.37	4-1
1957	Pauls Vixen	Pauls Fun – Harveystown Rice	Joe Booth (Private)	50.01	4-1
1958	Shares Again	Fire Prince – Racing Fly	W.B.Brown (Private)	49.46	4-9f
1959	Rapid Progress II	Barrowside – Brazen Hussey	Gunner Smith (Brighton)	50.59	4-5f
1960	Dancing Daisy	Solar Prince – Molls Blackface	Joe Booth (Private)	50.43	
1961	Westfield Prince	Coming Champion – Journeys End	Paddy Power (West Ham)	49.32	
1962	Rothmans Henrietta	Gulf of Darien – Clifden Cottage	Frank Sanderson (Private)	50.71	
1963	Shady Camelia	Romolas Dance – Shady Hazel	John Perrin (Private)	50.63	6-1
1964	Boothroyden Flash	Crazy Parachute – Knockmullagh Lady	Harry Bamford (Private)	50.40	
1965	Boreen Berry	Steady The Man – July Hawk	George Curtis (Brighton)	50.28	
1966	Breshan Crackers	Odd Venture – Pats Regret	George Curtis (Brighton)	51.71	
1967	Tanyard Swallow	Odd Venture – Tanyard There	George Curtis (Brighton)	50.21	4-1
1968	Sunrise Rover	Booked Out – Outcast Rover	Phil Rees Sr. (Wimbledon)	50.90	
1969	Sovereign Ore	Westpark Quail – Quare Wonder	John Perrin (Private)	48.70	
1970	Specfire	Spectre II – Lils Picture	Paddy McEvoy (Wimbledon)	49.36	
1971	Breachs Buzzard	Maryville Hi – Breachs Blizzard	Colin McNally (Perry Barr)	46.61	
1972	The Marchioness	Faithful Hope – Trojan Silver	Reg Young (Private)	46.01	7-4f
1973	Liams Toby	Clomoney Jet – This Is Susan	Tom Chamberlain (Private)	47.65	
1974	Silver Sceptre	Maryville Hi – Trojan Silver	Reg Young (Bletchley)	46.27	9-4
1975	Edenvale Lady	Yanka Boy – Back O'the Gap	Jack Smith (Catford)	46.75	

== Venues & Distances ==
- 1942-1971 (Catford 810y)
- 1972-1974 (Catford 790y)
- 1975-1975 (Catford 790m)

Discontinued
