= 1986 Irish Greyhound Derby =

- Venue: Shelbourne Park
- Location: Dublin
- End date: 20 September
- Total prize money: £25,000 (winner)

The 1986 Irish Greyhound Derby took place during August and September with the final being held at Shelbourne Park in Dublin on 20 September 1986. The competition was raced over the slightly longer race distance of 550 yards for the first time.

The winner Kyle Jack won £25,000 and was trained by John Field, owned by Michael Field and bred by Batt O'Keeffe. The competition was sponsored by Carrolls.

== Final result ==
At Shelbourne, 20 September (over 550 yards):

Position	Winner	Breeding	Trap	SP	Time	Trainer
1st	Kyle Jack	Oran Jack - Lady Barbra	4	8-1	30.41	John Field
2nd	Murlens Slippy	I'm Slippy - Murlens Chill	5	3-1	30.65	John Quinn
3rd	Tico	The Stranger - Derry Linda	3	4-5f	30.85	Arthur Hitch
4th	Heres Negrow	Sand Man - Heres Jenny	1	5-1	30.93	Ger McKenna
5th	Margaos Express	Express Opinion - Margaos Pay	6	25-1	30.99	Andrew Graham
6th	Carters Lad	Linda's Champion - Carters Lass	2	25-1	31.01	M McCall

=== Distances ===
3, 2½, 1, ¾, head (lengths)

== Competition Report ==
The Irish Derby had been increased in distance from 525 yards to 550 yards, dispensing with tradition but creating a longer run to the first bend. 1986 English Greyhound Derby champion Tico and finalist Murlens Slippy travelled over to Ireland in an attempt to win the competition for the English. Murlens Slippy would be put with trainer John Quinn for the event. The leading Irish hope was the track record holder Lodge Prince.

Lispopple Story, Tico and Kyle Jack all won in the opening round but the fastest winner was Blue Baron in 30.17. Murlens Slippy impressed in round two recording 30.33, Kyle Jack won again but Tico had to settle for second place behind Bog Lighter. Tico bounced back to winning ways in round three but Lodge Prince made a surprise exit in that round. Murlens Slippy and Kyle Jack both won again and remained unbeaten going into the semifinals.

Tico continued to impress in the semi-finals setting a time of 30.06, just three spots off the track record with Heres Negrow six lengths behind. Kyle Jack and Murlens Slippy both won yet again and remained unbeaten with victories over Margaos Express and Carters Lad respectively in their semi final heats.

Tico was installed the strong 4-5 favourite for the final but after a poor start the dream of an English-Irish double faded, Murlens Slippy was also slow away leaving Kyle Jack to win by three lengths.

== See also ==
- 1986 UK & Ireland Greyhound Racing Year
