= 2004 Irish Greyhound Derby =

2004 Paddy Power Irish Greyhound Derby
- Venue: Shelbourne Park
- Location: Dublin
- Start date: 11 August
- End date: 18 September
- Total prize money: €150,000 (winner)

The 2004 Irish Greyhound Derby took place during August and September with the final being held at Shelbourne Park in Dublin on 18 September 2004.

The winner Like A Shot won €150,000 and was trained by Owen McKenna, owned by Michael Kelly and bred by Patrick 'Paddy' Sinnott. The race was sponsored by the Paddy Power.

== Final result ==
At Shelbourne, 18 September (over 550 yards):

Position	Winner	Breeding	Trap	SP	Time	Trainer
1st	Like A Shot	Larkhill Jo - Black Stone Lace	5	10-1	29.87	Owen McKenna
2nd	Droopys Maldini	Droopys Kewell - Little Diamond UK	2	2-1f	29.94	Fraser Black
3rd	Disguised	Larkhill Jo - Newbridge Girl	3	7-2	29.99	Reggie Roberts
4th	Droopys Marco	Droopys Kewell - Little Diamond UK	4	12-1	30.06	Fraser Black
5th	Geldrops Touch	Droopys Vieri - Sporting Cleo	6	5-2	30.24	Owen McKenna
6th	World Class	Come On Ranger - Queen Survivor	1	6-1	30.26	Pat Buckley

=== Distances ===
¾, ½, ¾, 2¼, head (lengths)

== Competition Report ==
162 greyhounds lined up for the 2004 Paddy Power Irish Derby including the 2004 English Greyhound Derby champion Droopys Scholes. The increase in entries resulted in the first round being spread over three nights.

Droopys Shearer provided the best time in the opening round, the Ted Soppitt Select Stakes winner recorded 29.54. Persian Ruler won in 29.74 and Droopys Scholes in 29.75. In the second round Persian Ruler won again in 29.55 as did Droopys Shearer in 29.64 but there was a major shock with the elimination of Droopys Scholes, he found trouble and could not recover to qualify for the next round. World Class also returned to form with a 29.82 victory.

In the third round Deerfield Site went fastest in 29.63 and Droopys Maldini crossed the line in 29.74. Droopys Maldini then won again in the quarter finals going even better in a fast 29.52. Deerfield Site won well again as did Mineola Farloe with the remaining heat being won by Disguised. Like A Shot and World Class also qualified for the semi-finals.

Geldrops Touch won the first semi-final from Droopys Marco with World Class making the final holding off Deerfield Site. The second semi-final was a troubled heat that led to the unbeaten Disguised winning it from Like A Shot and Droopys Maldini.

Droopys Marco trapped well in the final to take an early lead from the fast starting Disguised, Marcos litter brother Droopys Maldini became the new leader by halfway, pursued by outsider Like A Shot despite the latter having to check behind Disguised. Like A Shot finished strongly to negotiate a path passed Droopys Maldini and Disguised to claim the title. The McKenna family continued their association with the Irish Derby history, the winning trainer was Owen McKenna son of Ger McKenna.

== Quarter finals ==
Heat 1 (Sep 4)
Pos	Name	SP	Time
1st	Droopys Maldini	5-4f	29.52
2nd	Indian Ruler	9-2	30.01
3rd	Tamna Rolo	20-1	30.02
4th	Dundrum Prince	11-4	30.07
5th	Ronans Delight	20-1	30.08
6th	Kilfera King	11-2	30.29

Heat 2 (Sep 4)
Pos	Name	SP	Time
1st	Deerfield Site	2-1f	29.61
2nd	Geldrops Touch	5-2	29.68
3rd	Droopys Marco	5-1	29.85
4th	Tyrur Ted	8-1	29.99
5th	Escholido	8-1	30.06
6th	Tomsheaboy	5-1	30.13

Heat 3 (Sep 4)
Pos	Name	SP	Time
1st	Disguised	7-2	29.60
2nd	Like A Shot	4-1	29.74
3rd	Make All	11-10f	29.81
4th	Nikita Billie	16-1	29.83
5th	Smiling Man	4-1	30.32
6th	Teds World Cup	33-1	30.37

Heat 4 (Sep 4)
Pos	Name	SP	Time
1st	Mineola Farloe	7-2	29.87
2nd	Express Hancho	20-1	29.90
3rd	World Class	9-4	29.91
4th	Persian Ruler	5-4f	29.98
5th	Bricken Jack	20-1	30.09
6th	Balintore Brave	9-1	30.44

== Semi finals ==
First Semi Final (Sep 11)
Pos	Name of Greyhound	SP	Time
1st	Geldrops Touch	9-4f	29.71
2nd	Droopys Marco	8-1	29.85
3rd	World Class	5-2	29.92
4th	Deerfield Site	7-2	29.97
5th	Express Hancho	20-1	30.04
6th	Indian Ruler	9-2	30.25

Second Semi Final (Sep 11)
Pos	Name of Greyhound	SP	Time
1st	Disguised	3-1	29.85
2nd	Like A Shot	7-1	29.86
3rd	Droopys Maldini	5-4f	30.07
4th	Make All	6-1	30.14
5th	Mineola Farloe	4-1	30.24
6th	Tamna Rolo	10-1	30.31

== See also ==
- 2004 UK & Ireland Greyhound Racing Year
