= 1970 English Greyhound Derby =

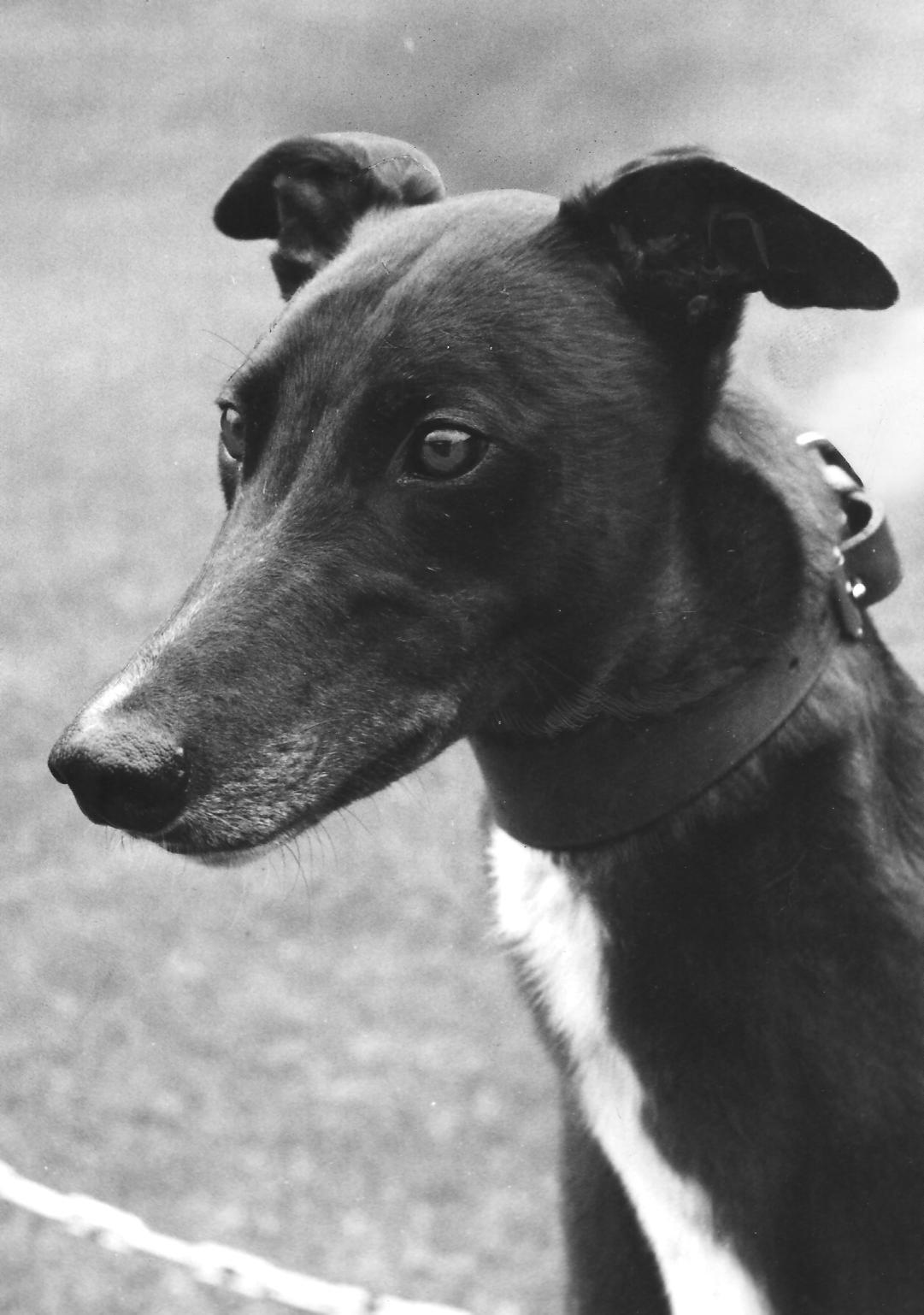
- Runner Up Little County
- Location: White City Stadium
- Start date: 13 June
- End date: 27 June
- Total prize money: £9,861 (winner)

The 1970 Greyhound Derby took place during June with the final being held on 27 June 1970 at White City Stadium. The winner was John Silver and the winning owner received £9,861. John Silver was owned, bred and reared by Reg Young, who later went on to take out a trainer's licence in his own right. 1981

== Competition Report ==
The 1970 derby attracted 187 entries and the market leaders were Cals Pick the 1969 Greyhound of the Year, Trafalgar Cup winner Sherwood Glen, Moordyke Spot, Valiant Ray the Select Stakes champion and Hack It Lee. In addition trainer Geoff DeMulder had a greyhound called Little County that was subject to significant ante-post wagers.

The qualifying races were a series of races with no betting to determine which greyhounds would line up as the final 48. On the Monday before the competition got underway 125 hounds took part and Cals Pick, Valiant Ray and Sherwood Glen all failed to progress through. John Silver was the fastest qualifier in 28.94 sec and subsequently became one of the favourites alongside Moordyke Spot.

During the first round Moordyke Spot went quickest in 28.74 with John Silver and Little County also winning. The second round pitted Moordyke Spot with John Silver and the latter came out on top in 28.56; Little County remained unbeaten which attracted a £5,000 bet by B.J. Patel to win the event.

The semi-finals arrived and DeMulder's Little County won again going into the final unbeaten whilst Moordyke Sport gained quick revenge over John Silver in the second heat. On the run up to final night Little County was backed once again in London bookmakers shops and the bookies now had £25,000 liabilities against the greyhound.

The bookmakers made Little County 7-4 favourite for the final but he missed the break as the lids went up. Recovering well he showed good early pace to get into contention by the second bend and then led by the third bend but John Silver, who was involved in early bunching was always in contention before passing Little County to claim a one length victory. The success enabled Barbara Tompkins to claim responsibility for a Derby winner one year after her involvement with Sand Star. John Silver, a British-bred son of 1966 winner Faithful Hope was bred and owned by Reg Young, who later became a promoter at the Milton Keynes track.

== Final result ==
At White City (over 525 yards):

Position	Name of Greyhound	Breeding	Trap	SP	Time	Trainer
1st	John Silver	Faithful Hope - Trojan Silver	2	11-4	29.01	Barbara Tompkins (Private)
2nd	Little County	The Grand Silver - No Toast	4	7-4f	29.08	Geoff De Mulder (Hall Green)
3rd	Corral Romeo	Printer's Present - Corral Del	3	50-1	29.48	Nora Gleeson (Wimbledon)
4th	Hymus Silver	Oregon Prince - Little Scamp	6	100-7	29.58	Paddy Milligan (Private)
5th	Sirius	Shane's Legacy - Jersey Queen	5	11-2	29.72	George Curtis (Hove)
6th	Moordyke Spot	Newdown Heather - Nelsons Farewell	1	9-4	29.92	Stan Martin (Wimbledon)

=== Distances ===
1, 5, 1¼, 1¾, 2½ (lengths)
The distances between the greyhounds are in finishing order and shown in lengths. One length is equal to 0.08 of one second.

== Quarter finals ==
Heat 1 (June 18)
Pos	Name	SP	Time
1st	Sirius	10-11f	29.26
2nd	Faithful Dick	11-2	29.27
3rd	Hymus Silver	9-1	29.37
4th	Killinarden Jet	16-1	29.67
5th	Westpark Toots	10-3	30.27
N/R	Shady Shuffle		

Heat 2 (June 18)
Pos	Name	SP	Time
1st	Kinloch Jewel	7-2	28.99
2nd	Clorinka Castle	20-1	29.39
3rd	Sole Aim	9-2	29.51
4th	Cash For Dan	11-10f	29.73
5th	Legane Glory	8-1	29.93
6th	Brillane Clipper	6-1	30.17

Heat 3 (June 18)
Pos	Name	SP	Time
1st	John Silver	6-4	28.56
2nd	Moordyke Spot	4-5f	28.78
3rd	Gun Black	12-1	29.24
4th	Star Cheatha	33-1	29.48
5th	Idle Thought	33-1	29.50
6th	Curraroe	40-1	29.90

Heat 4 (June 18)
Pos	Name	SP	Time
1st	Little County	2-5f	28.84
2nd	Heather Lad	16-1	29.48
3rd	Corral Romeo	16-1	29.52
4th	Healthy	7-1	29.64
5th	Mayfield Dan	7-1	29.70
6th	Chicks Chic Chic	10-1	29.76

== Semi finals ==
First Semi Final (Jun 20)
Pos	Name of Greyhound	SP	Time	Trainer
1st	Moordyke Spot	5-4	29.26	Martin
2nd	John Silver	11-10f	29.36	Tompkins
3rd	Corral Romeo	66-1	29.50	Gleeson
4th	Clorinka Castle	33-1	29.64	Geggus
5th	Gun Black	16-1	29.65	Hodson
6th	Faithful Dick	20-1	29.85	

Second Semi Final (Jun 20)
Pos	Name of Greyhound	SP	Time	Trainer
1st	Little County	1-1f	28.74	De Mulder
2nd	Sirius	7-2	28.84	Curtis
3rd	Hymus Silver	16-1	29.18	Milligan
4th	Kinloch Jewel	4-1	29.34	Hookway
5th	Sole Aim	10-1	29.42	Geggus
6th	Heather Lad	25-1	29.64	Kovac

== See also ==
- 1970 UK & Ireland Greyhound Racing Year
