= Tico (greyhound) =

British racing greyhound

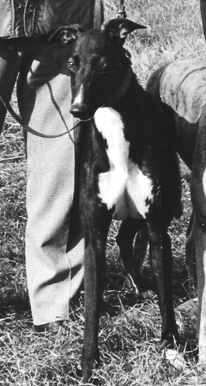
- Tico in 1986
- Sire: The Stranger
- Dam: Derry Linda
- Sex: Dog
- Whelped: 6 February 1984
- Died: February 1995 (aged 11)
- Country: Ireland
- Color: Black
- Breeder: James Morrissey
- Owner: Alan Smee
- Trainer: Arthur Hitch

Record
- 23

Major wins
- 17

Honours
- 1986 English Greyhound Derby champion Pall Mall Stakes champion

Tico was one of the sports leading racing greyhounds during the 1980s and a winner of the English Greyhound Derby.

== Whelping and rearing ==
He was whelped 6 February 1984, from a mating between The Stranger and Derry Linda. He was bred by Jim Morrissey of Carrick-on-Suir. As a puppy he was moved to a pig farm and reared by Sean and Michael Dunphy of Portlaw.

== Racing ==
=== 1985 ===
Tico made his debut at Clonmel Greyhound Stadium on 8 July 1985 when owned by Morrissey and won by ten lengths. He was purchased by Alan Smee for £5,000 and sent to trainer Arthur Hitch, who had recently left Oxford Stadium for Slough Stadium. He raced several times at Wimbledon Stadium before being rested until the following year.

=== 1986 ===
The black dog was aimed at the Pall Mall Stakes and went on to win the final at Harringay Stadium. In the final he beat his Hot Sauce Yankee. After winning a Derby Trial Stake at Harringay (on 16 May) he was entered for the 1986 English Greyhound Derby and was one of the leading fancies for the competition. He won a qualifying heat on 27 May (at odds of 1–6) and first round on 7 June (at odds of 4–7), but lost to the new track record holder Fearless Action in the second round but still qualified. In the quarter-finals he bounced back on 19 June in the quarter-finals and impressed when beating Fearless Action and Lodge Prince in the semi-finals two days later. In the final he ran brilliantly to win by over five lengths helped by Murlens Slippy moving off and hampering Fearless Action, kennelmate Master Hardy finished second.

Tico then travelled to Shelbourne Park in an attempt to double up and win the 1986 Irish Greyhound Derby. The English champion progressed to the final which included a semi final win in 30.06 for 550 yards, just three spots off the track record. Although hot favourite for the final on 20 September he could only finish third after a poor start ruined his chances.

== Retirement ==
After a final appearance and win at Harringay he was retired to stud despite only being lightly raced, with a record of 17 wins from 23 races. He died in Ireland in February 1995 aged 11.

== Pedigree ==
Yanka Boy
Dark Mercury
An Tain
The Stranger
Myross Again
Lovely Blend
Clomoney Star
Tico
Monalee Champion
Linda's Champion
Merry Linda
Derry Linda
Kilbelin Style
Ballinderry Moth
Skipping Chick
