= 1969 English Greyhound Derby =

- Location: White City Stadium
- Start date: 14 June
- End date: 28 June
- Total prize money: £7,252 (winner)

The 1969 Greyhound Derby took place during June with the final being held on 28 June 1969 at White City Stadium. The winner was Sand Star and the winning owner Hamilton Orr received £7,252.

== Final result ==
At White City (over 525 yards):

Position	Name of Greyhound	Breeding	Trap	SP	Time	Trainer
1st	Sand Star	Bauhus - Direct Lead	4	5-4f	28.76	Hamilton Orr (Ireland)
2nd	Kilbelin Style	Prairie Flash - Clomoney Grand	1	6-4	28.92	Tom Johnston Jr. (Wembley)
3rd	Ploverfield Dan	Shane's Legacy - Steady Mary	2	100-8	29.04	John Shevlin (West Ham)
4th	Petrovitch	Vals Parachute - Scintilla	5	20-1	29.12	Jack Harvey (Wembley)
5th	Hard Held	Lisheeghan Brigadier - Thats An Idea	6	13-2	29.52	George Curtis (Hove)
6th	Barrack Street	Honey Pears - Barrack Street There	3	11-2	29.84	Dave Barker (Walthamstow)

=== Distances ===
2, 1½, 1, 5, 4 (lengths)
The distances between the greyhounds are in finishing order and shown in lengths. From 1950 one length was equal to 0.08 of one second.

== Competition Report ==
Yellow Printer headed the entry for the Derby for the second consecutive year; he was priced at a short 8-1 ahead of Flaming King and Winter Hope at 16-1. Other market leaders included last year’s finalist Shady Begonia, Finolas Yarn (the recent winner of the Callanan Cup but now representing owner Cyril Young and Tommy Johnston at Wembley) and Sand Star kennelled with Eric and Gwen Adkins in Northampton and looked after by kennelmaid Barbara Tompkins. Finolas Yarn went lame during the qualifying heats.

Yellow Printer won his first round in 28.82 but his time was only the fourth fastest of the eight heats, Sand Star and Doubtful Venture both recorded 28.82 with 'Infatuated' winning in 28.84. After the first round Sand Star was subject to an £8,000 post first-round offer from Yellow Printer's owners Pauline Wallis and Sir Robert Adeane which was rejected. Cals Pick and Shady Begonia were notable first round casualties.

The second round drew Yellow Printer with Sand Star and top Wembley hound Kilbelin Style. The latter was beaten by the late run of Sand Star with Pallas Joy grabbing third place which meant for the second year in succession Yellow Printer had gone out early. Doubtful Venture failed to progress but Valiant Ray picked up a second success, the only greyhound apart from Sand Star to remain unbeaten.

Sand Star caught Kilbelin Style in the semi-finals winning by a short head in a repeat of their second round race. Barrack Street claimed third from Valiant Ray. The other semi produced a blanket finish with Hard Held getting the photo finish decision from Petrovitch and Ploverfield Dan, the unlucky favourite Pallas Joy was badly bumped and knocked out.

Sand Star and Kilbelin Style dominated the betting for the final and the race was over quickly because Sand Star made a good break and was soon drawing clear. Kilbelin Style reduced the deficit and ran well for second place.

== Quarter finals ==
Heat 1
Pos	Name	SP	Time
1st	Sand Star	7-4f	28.86
2nd	Kilbelin Style	4-1	28.87
3rd	Pallas Joy	8-1	28.88
4th	Yellow Printer	9-4	29.02
5th	Infatuated	9-1	29.50
6th	Ardroney Chief	20-1	29.53

Heat 2
Pos	Name	SP	Time
1st	Valiant Ray	5-2	28.78
2nd	Hard Held	9-2	29.18
3rd	Greenane Gem	4-1	29.24
4th	Booked Six	9-1	29.30
5th	Computer Check	100-7	29.66
6th	Gag Blakney	2-1f	29.72

Heat 3
Pos	Name	SP	Time
1st	Shady Bracelet	2-1	28.70
2nd	Tullyallen	6-1	28.92
3rd	Blackwater Five	13-2	29.16
4th	Monalee Peter	10-1	29.28
5th	Doubtful Venture	6-4f	29.32
N/R	Duck Strangler		

Heat 4
Pos	Name	SP	Time
1st	Barrack Street	9-2	28.93
2nd	Ploverfield Dan	10-3	29.09
3rd	Petrovitch	6-1	29.35
4th	Cash For Dan	7-4f	29.45
5th	Cals Invader	6-1	29.53
6th	Mister Rubble	8-1	30.09

== Semi finals ==
First Semi Final (Jun 21)
Pos	Name of Greyhound	SP	Time	Trainer
1st	Hard Held	7-2	29.26	Curtis
2nd	Petrovitch	10-1	29.27	Harvey
3rd	Ploverfield Dan	11-2	29.29	Shevlin
4th	Blackwater Five	9-1	29.61	France
5th	Pallas Joy	7-4f	29.67	Jackson
6th	Tullyallen	7-2	29.91	Orton

Second Semi Final (Jun 21)
Pos	Name of Greyhound	SP	Time	Trainer
1st	Sand Star	5-4f	28.83	Orr
2nd	Kilbelin Style	9-2	28.84	Johnston Jr.
3rd	Barrack Street	100-6	28.96	Barker
4th	Valiant Ray	4-1	29.06	O'Neill
5th	Greenane Gem	100-7	29.20	Lewis
6th	Shady Bracelet	4-1	29.24	Collett

== See also ==
- 1969 UK & Ireland Greyhound Racing Year
