= 1994 Irish Greyhound Derby =

Irish Greyhound race

1994 Respond Irish Greyhound Derby
- Venue: Shelbourne Park
- Location: Dublin
- End date: 24 September
- Total prize money: £50,000 (winner)

The 1994 Irish Greyhound Derby took place during August and September with the final being held at Shelbourne Park in Dublin on 24 September 1994.

The winner Joyful Tidings won £50,000 and was trained by Donie O'Regan, owned by Michael Carmody and bred by Donal O'Connor. The race was sponsored by the Kerry Group's dog food product 'Respond'.

== Final result ==
At Shelbourne, 24 September (over 550 yards):

Position	Winner	Breeding	Trap	SP	Time	Trainer
1st	Joyful Tidings	Whisper Wishes - Newmans Mall	5	5-2	30.35	Donie O'Regan
2nd	Michaels Machine	Satharn Beo - Sleepy Midget	4	9-2	30.63	Jimmy O'Connor
3rd	Emmett Robert	Murlens Slippy - Long Valley Lady	3		30.79	Christy O'Callaghan
4th	Old Maid	Moral Support - Olan Rose	1	6-4f	30.87	Reggie Roberts
5th	Nimble Piper	Tico - Fair Damsel	2		30.88	Martin Broughan
6th	Ayr Flyer	Ardfert Sean - Slaneyside Glory	6		30.89	Patsy Byrne

=== Distances ===
3½, 2, 1, short head, short head (lengths)

== Competition Report ==
The leading entry for the Irish Derby was the 1994 English Greyhound Derby champion Moral Standards who would attempt to take the trophy back to England for the first time since 1971. Ireland's leading contender was Champion Stakes winner Velvet Rocket. Other notable runners included English Derby finalist Ayr Flyer who was now with Patsy Byrne and the Scottish Greyhound Derby champion Droopys Sandy.

The repechage system was scrapped but four would qualify from the first two rounds resulting in two rounds of racing that would not give a true indication of the probable winner at this stage. Michaels Machine was fastest in qualifying timed at 30.16 and the best first round time went to Joyful Tidings in 30.21, Moral Standards failed to win either round.

Velvet Rocket came good in the second round posting 30.31 and Old Maid remained unbeaten, Moral Standards lost yet again. The quarter finals started with heavy rain and Joyful Tidings went fastest again in 30.39 with Old Maid still unbeaten, Droopys Sandy failed to make the semis along with Westmead Merlin.

Old Maid won her sixth consecutive race in the first semi-final with Ayr Flyer second and Nimble Piper third; Moral Standards form had deserted him finishing fifth and without a win in the competition. The other semi saw Joyful Tidings beat Michaels Machine and Emmett Robert.

In the final the well drawn Old Maid went off favourite but it was Joyful Tidings that came good cutting off Michaels Machine and Ayr Flyer at the first bend and he eased to victory.

== See also ==
- 1994 UK & Ireland Greyhound Racing Year
