= 2004 English Greyhound Derby =

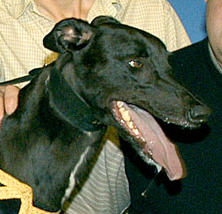
- Finalist Fire Height Dan
- Location: Wimbledon Stadium
- End date: 5 June
- Total prize money: £100,000 (winner)

The 2004 William Hill Greyhound Derby took place during May & June with the final being held on 5 June 2004 at Wimbledon Stadium. The winner Droopys Scholes received £100,000.

== Quarter-finals ==
Heat 1 (May 25)
Pos	Name	SP	Time
1st	Droopys Demaggio	5-1	28.96
2nd	Big Freeze	5-4f	29.00
3rd	Tims Crow	5-2	29.10
4th	Count Gelignite	8-1	29.32
5th	Niamhs Bill	16-1	29.33
6th	Lenson Mark	8-1	29.43

Heat 2 (May 25)
Pos	Name	SP	Time
1st	Ballymac Kewell	5-1	28.75
2nd	Droopys Scholes	2-1f	28.89
3rd	Escholido	3-1	28.95
4th	Farloe Verdict	7-2	29.03
5th	Drop Goal Jonny	7-1	29.53
6th	Mustang Hero	20-1	29.67

Heat 3 (May 25)
Pos	Name	SP	Time
1st	Premier Fantasy	1-2f	28.43
2nd	Rhincrew Seagal	5-2	28.49
3rd	Droopys Oasis	10-1	28.69
4th	Baby Hawk	7-1	28.87
5th	Urban Spaceman	20-1	28.99
6th	Moral Enigma	50-1	29.05

Heat 4 (May 25)
Pos	Name	SP	Time
1st	Fire Height Dan	4-6f	28.71
2nd	Greenside Wonder	7-1	28.91
3rd	Special Trick	7-1	28.97
4th	Centour Para	3-1	29.11
5th	Noirs Seanie	25-1	29.19
6th	Bowmers King	25-1	29.39

== Semi-finals ==
First Semi-final (May 29)
Pos	Name of Greyhound	SP	Time	Trainer
1st	Tims Crow	8-1	28.79	Rich
2nd	Rhincrew Seagal	13-8f	28.93	Peacock
3rd	Fire Height Dan	7-4	28.95	Puzey
4th	Escholido	8-1	29.07	Findlay
5th	Special Trick	20-1	29.09	Jones
6th	Greenside Wonder	6-1	29.13	Pruhs

Second Semi-final (May 29)
Pos	Name of Greyhound	SP	Time	Trainer
1st	Ballymac Kewell	6-1	28.47	Philpott
2nd	Droopys Scholes	4-1	28.63	Reilly
3rd	Big Freeze	7-1	28.75	Clemenson
4th	Droopys Oasis	14-1	28.93	Clemenson
5th	Droopys Demaggio	16-1	00.00	Lister
6th	Premier Fantasy	4-7f	00.00	Graham

== Final result ==
At Wimbledon (over 480 metres):

Position	Name of Greyhound	Breeding	Trap	Sectional	SP	Time	Trainer
1st	Droopys Scholes	Top Honcho - Droopys Kristin	3	4.92	7-2	28.62	Ian Reilly (Ireland)
2nd	Big Freeze	Top Honcho - First to Return	5	4.99	10-1	28.68	Brian Clemenson (Hove)
3rd	Tims Crow	Lenson Lad - Churchtown Spice	6	4.84	4-1	28.72	Peter Rich (Romford)
4th	Rhincrew Seagal	Droopys Vieri - Rhincrew Armada	4	5.08	2-1f	28.75	Ray Peacock (Wimbledon)
5th	Ballymac Kewell	Droopys Woods - Blonde Returns	2	5.05	7-2	28.96	Carly Philpott (Private)
6th	Fire Height Dan	Carlton Bale - September Mist	3	4.93	6-1	29.02	Mick Puzey (Walthamstow)

=== Distances ===
¾, ½, neck, 2½, ¾ (lengths)
The distances between the greyhounds are in finishing order and shown in lengths. One length is equal to 0.08 of one second.

== Competition report ==
One of the ante-post favorites Droopys Shearer bypassed the event recuperating following a turbulent Scottish Greyhound Derby campaign. The very first heat on 6 May resulted in the fastest winner of the night when Tels Coogee Boy won in 28.85; the Pall Mall champion Tims Crow also started well with a customary fast starting win. The following night saw two of the big Irish favourites impress, Droopys Scholes recorded a very fast 28.60 and the Premier Fantasy won in 28.80, the latter had come to prominence in December 2003 when he won the Comerford Cakes National Puppy Stakes at Shelbourne Park, a competition that saw Droopys Scholes win the consolation final. The best of the third set of Derby heats was Drop Goal Jonny (28.81).

The second round resulted in many of the major contenders duly posting a second consecutive win including Droopys Scholes, Big Freeze, Droopys Demaggio, defending champion and the new Scottish Derby champion Farloe Verdict, Premier Fantasy and Drop Goal Jonny. Round three ended with undefeated campaigns for Droopys Scholes, Farloe Verdict and Premier Fantasy while Rhincrew Seagal went fastest in 28.52 and looked a major threat. Both Indian Ruler and Droopys Cahill suffered unlucky exits.

They started with Droopys Demaggio claiming the first heat from Big Freeze and Tims Crow. The awaited second heat was won by Ballymac Kewell with Droopys Scholes finishing second and Farloe Verdict and Drop Goal Jonny out of the competition. Premier Fantasy duly won. The fourth and final heat went to Fire Height Dan who was showing great stamina for an early paced runner.

The semi finals would be a third quick run for the 12 runners left and that surprisingly had no effect on Tims Crow and Fire Height Dan who both qualified for the final split by Rhincrew Seagal; the pair were performing superbly over a distance that was slightly longer than they were used to. The second semi was won by Ballymac Kewell beating Droopys Scholes and Big Freeze, the event favourite Premier Fantasy finished badly lame.

In a competitive final Tims Crow bolted from the traps which effectively ended the hopes of Fire Height Dan who needed to lead but soon had to settle for an early third-place position behind both Tims Crow and Droopys Scholes who also made a great start. The other three runners made poor starts, particularly favourite Rhincrew Seagal, although he did finish well. Tims Crow maintained his lead but ominously Droopys Scholes was within striking distance. As they approached the finish Droopys Scholes took a decisive lead overtaking Tims Crow who was pipped to second place by a strong finishing Big Freeze.

== See also ==
- 2004 UK & Ireland Greyhound Racing Year
