= 1986 English Greyhound Derby =

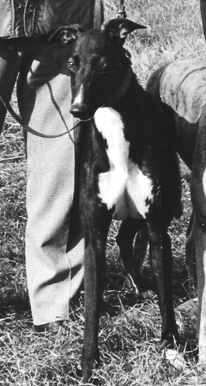
- Tico
- Location: Wimbledon Stadium
- End date: 30 June
- Total prize money: £25,000 (winner)

The 1986 Daily Mirror Greyhound Derby took place during May and June with the final being held on 30 June 1986 at Wimbledon Stadium. The winner was Tico and the winning owner Alan Smee received £25,000. The competition was sponsored by the Daily Mirror.

== Final result ==
At Wimbledon (over 480 metres):

Position	Name of Greyhound	Breeding	Trap	SP	Time	Trainer
1st	Tico	The Stranger - Derry Linda	5	6-4jf	28.69	Arthur Hitch (Slough)
2nd	Master Hardy	Ron Hardy - Sarahs Bunny	6	18-1	29.13	Arthur Hitch (Slough)
3rd	Sunley Express	Lax Law - Miss Crusty	1	12-1	29.17	Peter Rich (Ramsgate)
4th	Fearless Action	Ron Hardy - Sarahs Bunny	4	6-4jf	29.21	Geoff De Mulder (Oxford)
5th	Easy Prince	Easy and Slow - Scintillas Tina	2	9-1	29.22	John Honeysett (Wembley)
6th	Murlens Slippy	Im Slippy - Murlens Chill	3	5-1	29.34	Barbara Tompkins (Coventry)

=== Distances ===
5½, ½, ½, short head, 1½ (lengths)
The distances between the greyhounds are in finishing order and shown in lengths. One length is equal to 0.08 of one second.

== Competition Report ==
Ante-post favourites Fearless Action (DeMulder), Ballgroman Jet, Hot Sauce Yankee and Pall Mall Stakes winner Tico (Hitch) led the market when the Derby started.

The preliminary round resulted in Hot Sauce Yankee being the fastest heat winner on the first night in 28.71. During the second nights action Fearless Action broke the track record recording 28.51 and then on the same night Lodge Prince trained by Gary Baggs won in a later heat recording an even faster 28.34.

All the main contenders safely negotiated the preliminaries and first round before a second round draw matched Fearless Action, Tico, Ballygroman Jim and Irish hope Odell Supreme together; Ernie Gaskin's Ballygroman Jim failed to qualify from the difficult heat. Fearless Swift, Master Hardy and Lodge Prince won their heats but Hot Sauce Yankee and Fearless Power would take no further part in the event.

In the quarter-finals the winners were Lodge Prince, Hi Captain, Master Hardy and Tico with the main elimination being Odell Supreme.

Two very strong looking semi-finals started with the controversially wide seeded Murlens Slippy winning from Easy Prince with Master Hardy taking third place. Tico continued his form by taking the second semi from a fast finishing Fearless Action. Sunley Express outstayed track record holder Lodge Prince to claim that final qualifying place.

It was unusual for both ante-post favourites to reach the final and maintain favouritism for it. The bookmakers could not split the pair and chalked up 6-4 for both. Tico broke well and led all the way to win by an impressive 5½ lengths. Fearless Action nicely placed at the time was hampered by Murlens Slippy who swept wide. Master Hardy a kennelmate of Tico and litter brother to Fearless Action ran on well for second place creating a 1-2 finish for trainer Arthur Hitch.

== See also ==
- 1986 UK & Ireland Greyhound Racing Year
