= 1986 UK & Ireland Greyhound Racing Year =

British greyhound racing year

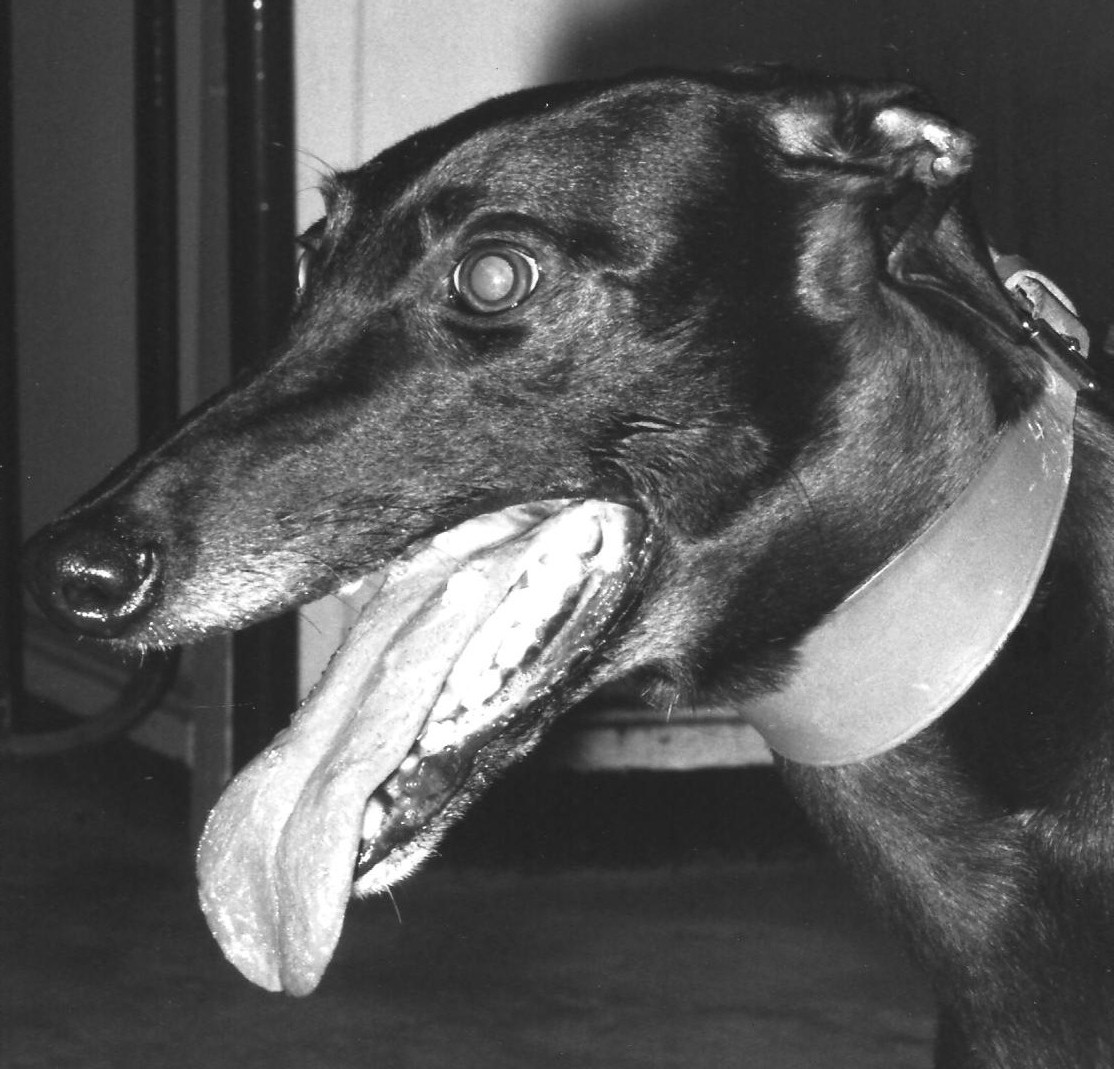
- Grand Prix & Gold Collar champion Westmead Move

The 1986 UK & Ireland Greyhound Racing Year was the 61st year of greyhound racing in the United Kingdom and the 60th year of greyhound racing in Ireland.

== Roll of honour ==
Major Winners
Award	Name of Winner
1986 English Greyhound Derby	Tico
1986 Irish Greyhound Derby	Kyle Jack
1986 Scottish Greyhound Derby	Not held
Greyhound Trainer of the Year	George Curtis
Greyhound of the Year	Ballyregan Bob
Irish Greyhound of the Year	Storm Villa
Trainers Championship	Kenny Linzell

== Summary ==
The year was dominated by the two superstar greyhounds Ballyregan Bob and Scurlogue Champ. Ballyregan Bob broke the world record by winning 32 consecutive races. The George Curtis trained greyhound was voted Greyhound of the Year for the second time. He had begun the year by winning seven more consecutive races, three of which were in track record times but a re-occurrence of his wrist injury had left him on 28 wins. This was just three short of the world record held by American greyhound Joe Dump trained by J C Stanley, which was set in 1979. The long-awaited winning re-appearance was on 13 November at Hove followed by wins 30 and 31 at Harringay, breaking yet another track record in the 31st victory that also equalled the world record. On 9 December Ballyregan Bob lined up for the Racing Post Challenge over 695 metres at his home track Hove. He won easily by 9¼ lengths and duly recorded 32 consecutive wins. Curtis and owners Cliff and Jess Kevern retired the champion to stud.

Scurlogue Champ achieved equal stardom by winning a second BBC Television Trophy and continued to amuse crowds with his remarkable running style, that off letting the field gain a significant lead before winning from a seemingly lost position. His career came to an end on 14 August when he finished lame at Nottingham in a 754-metre event and was retired. Ken Peckham's black dog ended with a record of 51 wins from 63 races and 20 track records.

The National Greyhound Racing Club (NGRC) released the annual returns, with totalisator turnover at £66,192,736 and attendances recorded at 3,792,738 from 5247 meetings. Track tote remained at 17.5% and government tote tax at 4%.

== Tracks ==
Northern Sports invested a £1½ million into Oxford Stadium, they had recently profited from a similar venture at sister track Ramsgate. Oxford's investment included a state of the art 250 seated, two-tiered restaurant and a leisure centre. Oxford then brought in two of the leading kennels in the country at the time. Geoff De Mulder returned to the track and Gary Baggs arrived from new sister track Ramsgate. Baggs based at Rosewood kennels was trialling greyhounds ready for Oxford when he received an offer from Walthamstow Racing Manager Tony Smith, an offer he could not refuse. The De Mulder appointment helped Oxford cover the loss of the soon to be English Greyhound Derby winning trainer Arthur Hitch to Slough.

Powderhall in Edinburgh was another to invest and marked their 60th anniversary with a new £400,000 grandstand but rival track Shawfield in Glasgow was closed by the Greyhound Racing Association (GRA). After negotiations it was sold to Shawfield Greyhound Racing and Leisure Company Ltd and they, in turn, would re-open the track the following year. The Brandon Stadium in Coventry closed for greyhound racing after only eight years trading although the track layout would remain in place and the Eclipse Stakes moved to Nottingham. The Ladbrokes £2½ million grand re-opening of Crayford Stadium took place on 1 September with the emphasis on providing the betting shops with the Bookmakers Afternoon Greyhound Service (BAGS).

== News ==
There were thirty fully licensed tracks, eight permit tracks and 58 independent tracks. Whitwood in Castleford raced for the first time under NGRC rules after switching from independent status. Independent track Halcrow in Gretna was opened by James Norman and sons in June but Cleethorpes closed.

== Competitions ==
Tico completed in the Pall Mall Stakes over 475m at Harringay and mastered his great rival Hot Sauce Yankee when beating him by just under three lengths in 28.45 seconds and later he returned for a Daily Mirror Derby Trial Stakes, which he won by nearly five lengths in 28.44 sec. Tico won the 1986 English Greyhound Derby and then reached the final of the 1986 Irish Greyhound Derby. His significant achievements were slightly overshadowed by the exploits of the two superstars.

A white and blue dog called Mollifrend Lucky won the Scurry Gold Cup when defeating Master Hardy in July and the Laurels at Wimbledon Stadium.

Savva camp continued their winning ways and produced a brilliant litter, which included Westmead Move, Olivers Wish and Westmead Call. While still a puppy Westmead Move won the Gold Collar at Catford Stadium and then proved to be a bitch of outstanding ability when going on to win the Grand Prix at Walthamstow, where she became the first greyhound to lower a track record set by Ballyregan Bob. Westmead Move went on to win the Midland Oaks at Hall Green as well as the Brighton Belle at Hove.

== Principal UK races ==
Grand National, Hall Green (April 5, 474m h, £3,000)
Pos	Name of Greyhound	Trainer	SP	Time	Trap
1st	Castlelyons Cash	Dinky Luckhurst	5-4f	29.51	4
2nd	Distant Echo	Bob Young	4-1	29.69	5
3rd	Musical Magpie	Fred Wiseman	11-2	29.72	3
4th	Ballyseedy Man	Paddy Milligan	6-1	29.92	1
5th	City Duke	Eric Pateman	12-1	30.02	2
6th	Rivers Run Free	Gordon Hodson	5-1	30.03	6

BBC TV Trophy, Brough Park (April 30, 825m, £3,000)
Pos	Name of Greyhound	Trainer	SP	Time	Trap
1st	Scurlogue Champ	Ken Peckham	2-5f	52.65	3
2nd	Sneaky Liberty		12-1	52.89	4
3rd	Bad Decision		8-1	52.95	6
4th	Yankees Shadow	George Curtis	7-1	53.15	5
5th	My Tootsie	Stewart Loan	16-1	53.37	1
6th	Rosewood Girl	Kenny Linzell	14-1	53.69	2

Scurry Gold Cup, Slough (Jul 19, 442m, £5,000)
Pos	Name of Greyhound	Trainer	SP	Time	Trap
1st	Mollifrend Lucky	Colin Packham	5-4f	26.62	1
2nd	Master Hardy	Arthur Hitch	11-8	26.72	2
3rd	Chiltern Sam	Peggy Cope	10-1	27.12	4
4th	Chiltern Charlie	Peggy Cope	25-1	27.13	3
5th	Top Prince	Colin Packham	25-1	27.33	5
6th	Polerone Dancer		10-1	27.97	6

St Leger, Wembley (Aug 29, 655m, £8,000)
Pos	Name of Greyhound	Trainer	SP	Time	Trap
1st	Lone Wolf	George Curtis	9-2	39.99	4
2nd	Low Sail	Nick Savva	1-2f	40.05	1
3rd	Winsor Ann	George Curtis	50-1	40.23	5
4th	Some Enchanter	Bertie Gaynor	50-1	40.33	2
5th	Mineola Athena	Arthur Hitch	8-1	40.45	6
6th	Ballyhaden Queen	Stan Gudgin	7-1	40.55	3

Gold Collar, Catford (Sep 20, 555m, £5,000)
Pos	Name of Greyhound	Trainer	SP	Time	Trap
1st	Westmead Move	Nick Savva	11-4	34.80	6
2nd	Rosehip Trish	Ernie Wiley	4-1	34.98	3
3rd	Cannon Express	Derek Knight	12-1	35.06	2
4th	Racewell Flyer	Gary Baggs	9-2	35.40	5
5th	Lilian Swan		20-1	35.52	4
6th	Lively Sailor	John Gibbons	11-8f	35.82	1

Cesarewitch, Belle Vue (Sep 27, 853m, £3,000)
Pos	Name of Greyhound	Trainer	SP	Time	Trap
1st	Yankees Shadow	George Curtis	4-7f	54.90	3
2nd	Easy Rodger	John Honeysett	6-1	55.04	2
3rd	Change Guard	Trevor Draper	9-4	55.36	1
4th	Raywee Delight	Kenny Linzell	20-1	55.39	6
5th	Mill Race Rose		100-1	55.81	5
6th	Father Ralph		66-1	56.33	4

The Grand Prix, Walthamstow (Oct 11, 640m, £5,000)
Pos	Name of Greyhound	Trainer	SP	Time	Trap
1st	Westmead Move	Nick Savva	10-11f	39.35+	5
2nd	Racewell Flyer	Gary Baggs	5-2	39.77	1
3rd	Easy Rodger	John Honeysett	6-1	39.83	3
4th	Mines Kango		33-1	39.87	4
5th	The Pinnacle		16-1	40.03	2
6th	Allscot John	Gary Baggs	5-1	40.07	6

+Track record

Oaks, Harringay (Oct 24, 475m, £5,000)
Pos	Name of Greyhound	Trainer	SP	Time	Trap
1st	Sullane Princess	Peter Payne	20-1	28.79	4
2nd	Culzean Echo	Kenny Linzell	7-2	29.05	1
3rd	Sparta Girl	Hazel Walden	14-1	29.13	2
4th	Mrs Cherry	Derek Knight	12-1	29.43	3
5th	Lucky Pine	Bob Young	12-1	29.44	6
6th	Fifty Pence	Sean Bourke	2-5f	29.72	5

Laurels, Wimbledon (Dec 27, 460m, £5,000)
Pos	Name of Greyhound	Trainer	SP	Time	Trap
1st	Mollifrend Lucky	Colin Packham	4-6f	27.48	6
2nd	Chalkies Pride	Norah McEllistrim	10-1	27.62	2
3rd	Fifty Pence	Gary Baggs	4-1	27.63	5
4th	Pagan Chimes		50-1	27.79	3
5th	Spiral Darkie	Gary Baggs	13-2	27.91	1
6th	Fiddlers Run	Gary Baggs	14-1	27.99	4

== Totalisator returns ==
Extended content

The totalisator returns declared to the National Greyhound Racing Club for the year 1986 are listed below.

Stadium	Turnover £
London (Walthamstow)	10,675,833
London (Wimbledon)	7,909,443
Romford	4,527,882
Brighton & Hove	4,276,914
London (Wembley)	3,857,199
London (Catford)	3,710,328
Slough	3,367,523
London (Harringay)	3,352,021
Birmingham (Hall Green)	2,633,754
Manchester (Belle Vue)	2,449,938
Edinburgh (Powderhall)	1,681,661
Newcastle (Brough Park)	1,475,357
Sheffield (Owlerton)	1,410,343

Stadium	Turnover £
Ramsgate	1,127,105
Wolverhampton (Monmore)	1,106,336
Maidstone	1,064,394
Yarmouth	959,024
Glasgow (Shawfield)	948,922
Portsmouth	948,796
Oxford	842,823
London (Hackney)	796,894
Milton Keynes	694,805
Crayford & Bexleyheath	658,103
Bristol	604,009
Reading	551,877
Derby	530,138

Stadium	Turnover £
Hull (Old Craven Park)	432,228
Henlow (Bedfordshire)	409,753
Rye House	403,660
Poole	393,807
Swindon	350,750
Cradley Heath	346,304
Nottingham	318,606
Peterborough	305,910
Norton Canes	282,388
Middlesbrough	268,862
Ipswich	238,671
Coventry	209,327
Castleford	71,048
