= 1994 UK & Ireland Greyhound Racing Year =

The 1994 UK & Ireland Greyhound Racing Year was the 69th year of greyhound racing in the United Kingdom and the 68th year of greyhound racing in Ireland.

== Roll of honour ==
Major Winners
Award	Name of Winner
1994 English Greyhound Derby	Moral Standards
1994 Irish Greyhound Derby	Joyful Tidings
1994 Scottish Greyhound Derby	Droopys Sandy
Greyhound Trainer of the Year	John McGee Sr.
Greyhound of the Year	Westmead Chick
Irish Greyhound of the Year	Joyful Tidings
Trainers Championship	John Coleman

== Summary ==
The National Greyhound Racing Club (NGRC) released the annual returns, with totalisator turnover at £87,885,471 and attendances recorded at 3,911,447 from 6393 meetings.

Westmead Chick trained by Nick Savva was voted Greyhound of the Year after winning the Oaks, Arc, Brighton Belle, Olympic and the Midland Flat. Joyful Tidings was voted Irish Greyhound of the Year after winning the 1994 Irish Greyhound Derby. Tony Meek won a second successive English Greyhound Derby following the victory of Moral Standards.

John McGee won the Greyhound Trainer of the Year for the seventh successive year. McGee was then involved in a major controversy after losing his licence following a positive urine test for a greyhound called Rabatino in the Peterborough Derby final. The NGRC heard the evidence and ruled that he should be suspended for the offence which led to a court battle. A high court judge overturned the NGRC suspension just weeks before he claimed his seventh crown but the NGRC in turn would then fight that ruling imposing the sanction. McGee returned to Ireland to train and would not be seen in NGRC racing again for four years.

== Tracks ==
Cradley Heath closed.

Brent Walker completed the sale of Hackney Wick Stadium to Fleetfoot Racing.

== News ==
The Greyhound Racing Association (GRA) allowed Slippy Corner to participate in the Laurels, which signalled the end of their policy on disqualification and brought them in line with NGRC rules. Previously any greyhound disqualified was not allowed to compete on a GRA track, whereas under NGRC rules you were allowed a second chance.

BAGS racing continued to grow with fixtures increasing and the betting shop service offering racing all day long. Walthamstow earned their first BAGS contract. Kevin Wilde replaced the GRA's Jarvis Astaire on the NGRC promoters association.

John Coleman sealed the trainer's championship at Walthamstow and Linda Jones made a breakthrough after gaining a contract at Romford.

Trevor Cobbold son of Joe Cobbold was diagnosed with cancer however continued to send out British bred winners. He died before the end of the year and left a legacy of 98 British bred winners in the year, the best return for many years. His wife Pam Cobbold took over the Utopia kennels. Australian born Frightful Flash began stud duties after leaving his quarantine kennels in Somerset on 16 February, his keeper Michael Dunne experienced significant success following the decision to bring the greyhound to the UK and Ireland from Australia.

== Competitions ==
In the final of the Scottish Greyhound Derby at Shawfield Stadium the Irish trained Droopys Sandy broke the track record and propelled him to ante post favouritism for the English Derby but the black dog missed the event. Oaks champion Pearls Girl claimed the Gold Collar at Catford Stadium before Redwood Girl successfully defended her Grand Prix title at Walthamstow Stadium.

Another bitch, Decoy Lynx was a surprise loser at the Cesarewitch at Belle Vue Stadium to 10-1 shot Sandollar Louie, a 5½ length first round win followed by a one length second round and 6 ½ length semi-final success sent the bitch off at a price of 1-7 but was beaten by a neck. Roger Waters', of the rock group Pink Floyd, greyhound Deenside Dean won the Ike Morris Laurels at Wimbledon Stadium a year after another one of his hounds Farmer Patrick lost in the Laurels final the previous year. Derby finalist Moaning Lad was knocked over in the Laurels final.

== Principal UK races ==
Daily Mirror/Sporting Life Grand National, Hall Green (Mar 26, 474m h, £5,000)
Pos	Name of Greyhound	Trainer	SP	Time	Trap
1st	Randy Savage	Kevin Connor	8-1	29.50	5
2nd	Heavenly Dream	Linda Mullins	5-2	29.66	6
3rd	Gis A Smile	Phil Rees Jr.	11-10f	29.98	2
4th	Jamesie Cotter	Tom Foster	8-1	30.28	3
5th	Super Spy	Linda Mullins	16-1	30.32	1
6th	Hi Brazil Sam	Tom Lanceman	12-1	30.52	4

BBC TV Trophy, Sunderland (Apr 6, 827m, £6,000)
Pos	Name of Greyhound	Trainer	SP	Time	Trap
1st	Jubilee Rebecca	Gordon Rooks	2-1	53.13	1
2nd	Killeenagh Dream		7-2	53.75	4
3rd	Decoy Lynx	Pam Cobbold	4-1	53.83	6
4th	Newry Town		13-8f	53.93	2
5th	Mossfield Fire	Pat McCombe	50-1	54.25	3
6th	Tonduff Susie		12-1	54.33	5

Reading Masters, Reading (Apr 30, 465m, £20,000)
Pos	Name of Greyhound	Trainer	SP	Time	Trap
1st	Druids Elprado	John McGee Jr.	11-8	27.99	1
2nd	Longvalley Manor	John Coleman	10-1	28.11	5
3rd	Farmer Patrick	Terry Dartnall	6-4f	28.15	4
4th	Salthill Champ	Ron Peckover	7-1	28.16	3
5th	Lyons Double	Donna Pickett	7-1	28.34	6
6th	Micks Rover	David Pruhs	14-1	28.35	2

Regal Scottish Derby, Shawfield (May 21, 500m, £20,000)
Pos	Name of Greyhound	Trainer	SP	Time	Trap
1st	Droopys Sandy	Francie Murray	1-1f	29.39+	6
2nd	So I Heard		20-1	30.09	4
3rd	Sure Fantasy	Charlie Lister	6-1	30.15	3
4th	Master Buck	A Watson Ire	7-1	30.23	2
5th	Moral Standards	Tony Meek	5-2	30.25	5
6th	Droopys Evelyn	Harry Williams	25-1	30.39	1

+Track record

Fosters Scurry Gold Cup, Catford (Jul 9, 385m, £2,500)
Pos	Name of Greyhound	Trainer	SP	Time	Trap
1st	Rabatino	John McGee Jr.	7-2	23.57	4
2nd	Highway Leader	Michael Bacon	7-4f	23.71	1
3rd	Decoy Apache	Pam Cobbold	5-1	23.89	6
4th	Libra John	John Gibbons	25-1	23.99	5
5th	Ardream	Richard Yeates	7-2	24.09	3
6th	Rickys Mate	David Puddy	10-1	24.29	2

John Humphreys Gold Collar, Catford (Sep 17, 555m, £7,500)
Pos	Name of Greyhound	Trainer	SP	Time	Trap
1st	Pearls Girl	Sam Sykes	7-4jf	34.82	6
2nd	Decoy Cheetah	Pam Cobbold	7-1	34.85	5
3rd	Heres Seanie	Pat Ryan	7-4jf	35.17	2
4th	Decoy Holly	Pam Cobbold	33-1	35.41	4
5th	Westmead Mystic	Nick Savva	20-1	35.63	3
6th	Paradise Slippy	Arthur Boyce	4-1	35.79	1

Fosters Cesarewitch, Belle Vue (Sep 24, 853m, £10,000)
Pos	Name of Greyhound	Trainer	SP	Time	Trap
1st	Sandollar Louie	Kevin Connor	10-1	55.20	6
2nd	Decoy Lynx	Pam Cobbold	1-7f	55.23	1
3rd	First Defence	Mary Harding	8-1	55.35	3
4th	Double Polano	R Wright	14-1	55.45	5
5th	Lone Rider	Jenny Walters	33-1	55.71	4
6th	Mossfield Fire	Pat McCombe	66-1	56.13	2

Laurent-Perrier Grand Prix, Walthamstow (Oct 8, 640m, £7,500)
Pos	Name of Greyhound	Trainer	SP	Time	Trap
1st	Redwood Girl	Ernie Gaskin Sr.	2-1	39.74	1
2nd	Twin Rainbow	John McGee Jr.	6-1	39.75	6
3rd	Decoy Lion	Pam Cobbold	13-8f	39.83	2
4th	Pat Brownside	Terry Dartnall	6-1	39.87	5
5th	Sonic Blue	Arthur Hitch	16-1	39.90	3
6th	Speakers Choice	John Honeysett	20-1	40.02	4

Ike Morris Laurels, Wimbledon (Oct 15, 460m, £7,500)
Pos	Name of Greyhound	Trainer	SP	Time	Trap
1st	Deenside Dean	Terry Dartnall	5-2	27.97	5
2nd	Dancing Lance		14-1	28.33	6
3rd	Egmont Scoby	Charlie Lister	6-1	28.43	2
4th	Jurassic Park	Patsy Byrne	9-2	28.93	3
5th	Moaning Lad	Theo Mentzis	4-5f	00.00	4
N/R	Parquet Paddy	Arthur Hitch			

Wendy Fair St Leger, Wembley (Nov 11, 655m, £12,000)
Pos	Name of Greyhound	Trainer	SP	Time	Trap
1st	Ballarue Minx	Bill Masters	7-2	39.65	4
2nd	Twin Rainbow	John McGee Jr.	3-1	39.73	1
3rd	Decoy Lion	Pam Cobbold	5-1	39.79	3
4th	Clongeel Fern	Ray Peacock	2-1f	40.01	2
5th	Sandanita	Lorraine Sams	5-1	40.03	6
N/R	Coolmona Road	Derek Knight			

St Marys Hospital Oaks, Wimbledon (Dec 17, 480m, £6,000)
Pos	Name of Greyhound	Trainer	SP	Time	Trap
1st	Westmead Chick	Nick Savva	8-11f	28.60	1
2nd	Droopys Fergie	Michael Dunphy	7-1	29.08	5
3rd	Egmont Joan	Charlie Lister	7-1	29.09	2
4th	Twin Rainbow	John McGee Jr.	16-1	29.21	4
5th	Not My Line	Hazel Walden	7-2	29.61	3
6th	Coomlogane Euro	John Cox	8-1	29.63	6

== Totalisator returns ==
Extended content

The totalisator returns declared to the National Greyhound Racing Club for the year 1994 are listed below.

Stadium	Turnover £
London (Walthamstow)	12,814,342
London (Wimbledon)	10,647,193
Romford	6,444,861
Birmingham (Hall Green)	5,362,104
London (Catford)	5,073,607
Brighton & Hove	5,022,073
Manchester (Belle Vue)	4,788,192
London (Wembley)	3,282,911
Crayford	2,784,522
Birmingham (Perry Barr)	2,285,133
Glasgow (Shawfield)	2,228,312
London (Hackney)	2,165,153
Sheffield (Owlerton)	2,119,876

Stadium	Turnover £
Peterborough	1,953,811
Sunderland	1,897,544
Newcastle (Brough Park)	1,791,153
Wolverhampton (Monmore)	1,682,387
Portsmouth	1,586,672
Oxford	1,549,700
Yarmouth	1,387,021
Reading	1,235,903
Ramsgate	1,196,763
Edinburgh (Powderhall)	1,117,783
Bristol	1,091,199
Doncaster (Stainforth)	873,516
Milton Keynes	844,294

Stadium	Turnover £
Canterbury	778,088
Nottingham	757,706
Swindon	678,515
Henlow (Bedfordshire)	572,445
Middlesbrough	450,499
Hull (New Craven Park)	421,915
Swaffham	381,854
Cradley Heath	320,482
Mildenhall	198,371
Rye House	89,271
Dundee	11,200
