= Brian Clemenson =

British greyhound racing professional trainer

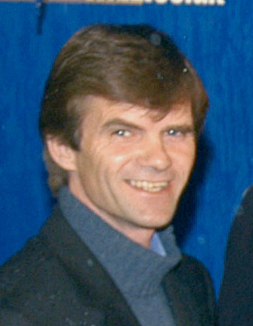
- Clemenson in 2004

Personal information
- Born: 1963 (age 61–62) Essex, England
- Occupation: Greyhound trainer

Sport
- Sport: Greyhound racing

Achievements and titles
- National finals: Classic/Feature wins: St Leger (2005); Cesarewitch (2001, 2002, 2006); TV Trophy (2001); Oaks (2003); Reading Masters (2000); Pall Mall Stakes (1999, 2003)

Brian Adrian Clemenson (born 1963) is a retired English greyhound trainer. He is a three times United Kingdom champion Champion Trainer.

== Profile ==
Clemenson was a head man for Kenny Linzell before taking out a trainer's licence. He raced out of Brighton & Hove Greyhound Stadium which he joined after a spell at Hackney Wick Stadium.

He was initially based at Bersheda Kennels in Wickford but a decade later moved to the Romford Greyhound Kennels in Billingshurst. He came to prominence in the early 1990s and after reaching multiple finals finally won a feature competition in 1999 when he won the Pall Mall Stakes.

He reached the final of the 1998 English Greyhound Derby with Tullerboy Cash before steering two runners into the 2002 English Greyhound Derby and finishing runner-up in the 2004 English Greyhound Derby.

It was during the early part of the decade that Clemenson was the leading trainer in Britain. He trained the winners of many competitions including three Cesarewitch's, an Oaks, a St Leger, four Champions Stakes, three Golden Jackets, eight Olympics, two Regencys, two Pall Mall Stakes, three Sussex Cups and two Trafalgar Cups.

He retired from training in 2012.

== Awards ==
He has won the Trainers Championship three times in 2002, 2003 and 2004.
