= 2004 UK & Ireland Greyhound Racing Year =

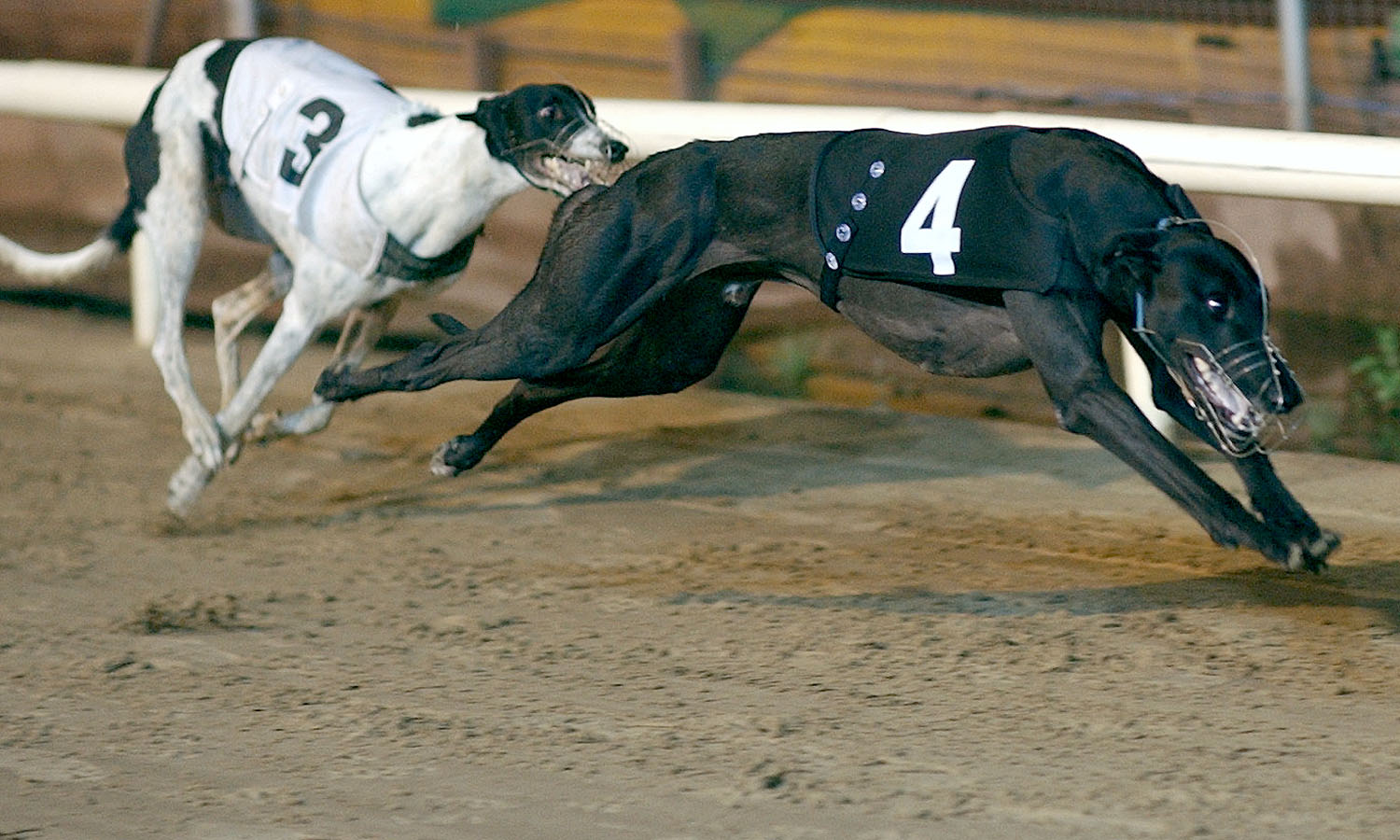
- Solid Money (trap 3) and Black Pear (trap 4) during the Cesarewitch heats

The 2004 UK & Ireland Greyhound Racing Year was the 79th year of greyhound racing in the United Kingdom and the 78th year of greyhound racing in Ireland.

== Summary ==
Irish racing was experiencing promising growth with increased prize money for competitions including the richest ever prize for a marathon event when the Corn Cuchulainn offered €50,000 for the winner at Harold's Cross.

The situation in Britain was not as simple after Richard Caborn, the Minister for Sport announced that it had been agreed that the bookmakers levy fund would increase to 0.5% in 2004, 0.55% in 2005 and 0.6% in 2006 and therefore doubling the sports income to £16 million within the three years. However the statement was incorrect because a 0.1% increase after three years would mean only a one sixth increase (16.6%). The promise turned out to be false because the levy fund actually decreased significantly over the next five years.

Droopys Scholes won the 2004 English Greyhound Derby and Like A Shot won the 2004 Irish Greyhound Derby. Charlie Lister won the Greyhound Trainer of the Year and Derby finalist, Arc, East Anglian Derby and Oxfordshire Gold Cup winner Fire Height Dan won the Greyhound of the Year.

=== Tracks ===
Coventry opened under new management after an 18-year absence.

=== Competitions ===
English Derby champion Farloe Verdict won the Scottish Greyhound Derby setting a new track record in the final. Brian Clemenson claimed his third successive Trainers Championship at Coventry. A brindle bitch called Roxholme Girl won the St Leger and the Gold Collar, the latter in a new track record time at the competition's new home of Belle Vue Stadium.

=== News ===
Trainer Tommy Foster retired from Wimbledon Stadium to concentrate on a small open race kennel and his son Jason joined Oxford Stadium.

== Roll of honour ==
Major Winners
| Award | Name of Winner |
|---|---|
| 2004 English Greyhound Derby | Droopys Scholes |
| 2004 Irish Greyhound Derby | Like A Shot |
| Greyhound Trainer of the Year | Charlie Lister |
| Greyhound of the Year | Fire Height Dan |
| Irish Dog and Bitch of the Year | Premier Fantasy / Legal Moment |

Betfair Trainers Championship, Coventry (Jun 27)
| Pos | Name of Trainer | Points |
|---|---|---|
| 1st | Brian Clemenson | 48 |
| 2nd | John Mullins | 41 |
| 3rd | Charlie Lister | 37 |
| 4th | Linda Jones | 36 |
| 5th | Ernie Gaskin Sr. | 26 |
| 6th | Paul Young | 19 |

=== Principal UK finals ===
William Hill TV Trophy, Wimbledon (Mar 16, 872m, £6,000)
| Pos | Name of Greyhound | Trainer | SP | Time | Trap |
|---|---|---|---|---|---|
| 1st | Double Take | Andy Heyes | 55.22 | 11-10f | 5 |
| 2nd | Latin Beauty | Cheryl Miller | 55.30 | 12-1 | 1 |
| 3rd | Hesley Gale | Chris Lund | 55.32 | 5-1 | 3 |
| 4th | Ericas Equity | Paul Young | 55.33 | 7-4 | 2 |
| 5th | Getaway Harp | Albert Dale | 55.37 | 25-1 | 6 |
| 6th | Aughacasla Erin | Ken Tester | 55.38 | 20-1 | 4 |

Totesport Scottish Derby, Shawfield (Apr 3, 480m, £25,000)
| Pos | Name of Greyhound | Trainer | SP | Time | Trap |
|---|---|---|---|---|---|
| 1st | Farloe Verdict | Charlie Lister | 11-4 | 28.79+ | 2 |
| 2nd | Legal Moment | Pat Buckley | 4-1 | 29.21 | 3 |
| 3rd | Farloe Marathon | Charlie Lister | 7-1 | 29.23 | 5 |
| 4th | Cathals Idol | Pat Buckley | 14-1 | 29.51 | 6 |
| 5th | Holdyoursilence | Liz McNair | 33-1 | 30.07 | 4 |
| 6th | World Class | Pat Buckley | 11-10f | 30.31 | 1 |

+ Track record

Reading Masters, Reading (Jul 18, 465m, £20,000)
| Pos | Name of Greyhound | Trainer | SP | Time | Trap |
|---|---|---|---|---|---|
| 1st | Droopys Chester | Carly Philpott | 7-1 | 27.92 | 6 |
| 2nd | Manera Spark | John Mullins | 9-2 | 27.94 | 1 |
| 3rd | Droopys Corleone | Daniel Riordan | 6-4f | 28.16 | 3 |
| 4th | Three Way Ebony | Jackie Taylor | 4-1 | 28.26 | 2 |
| 5th | Terry Henry | Jackie Taylor | 5-1 | 28.48 | 5 |
| 6th | Pennys Worth | Richard Baker | 7-1 | 28.66 | 4 |

William Hill Cesarewitch, Oxford (Aug 17, 645m, £5,000)
| Pos | Name of Greyhound | Trainer | SP | Time | Trap |
|---|---|---|---|---|---|
| 1st | Solid Money | Derek Knight | 9-4 | 39.56 | 3 |
| 2nd | Black Pear | Wayne Wrighting | 4-5f | 39.68 | 5 |
| 3rd | Archers Enero | Paul Young | 20-1 | 39.92 | 6 |
| 4th | Mustang Hero | Brian Clemenson | 16-1 | 40.10 | 1 |
| 5th | Seabiscuit | Russell Warren | 6-1 | 40.13 | 2 |
| 6th | Frisby Figo | Harry Crapper | 10-1 | 40.23 | 4 |

Victor Chandler Grand Prix, Walthamstow (Oct 2, 640m, £10,000)
| Pos | Name of Greyhound | Trainer | SP | Time | Trap |
|---|---|---|---|---|---|
| 1st | Ronnies Flight | Linda Jones | 11-8f | 40.03 | 2 |
| 2nd | Marmions | Paul Young | 6-1 | 40.33 | 5 |
| 3rd | Jack Spark | John Mullins | 9-2 | 40.39 | 1 |
| 4th | Big Freeze | Brian Clemenson | 14-1 | 40.47 | 3 |
| 5th | Baltimore Althea | Ernie Gaskin Sr. | 7-2 | 40.48 | 6 |
| 6th | Droopys Napoli | Paul Young | 8-1 | 40.62 | 4 |

William Hill Grand National, Wimbledon (Oct 5, 460mH, £7,500)
| Pos | Name of Greyhound | Trainer | SP | Time | Trap |
|---|---|---|---|---|---|
| 1st | Four Handed | Jim Reynolds | 6-4f | 28.46 | 4 |
| 2nd | Selby Ben | Tom Foster | 5-2 | 28.48 | 2 |
| 3rd | Ballyeacle | Norah McEllistrim | 7-1 | 28.62 | 1 |
| 4th | Canon Tom | Seamus Cahill | 5-1 | 28.70 | 6 |
| 5th | Ivors Surprise | Phil Rees Jr. | 8-1 | 28.99 | 3 |
| 6th | Nacap Junior | Norah McEllistrim | 16-1 | 29.06 | 5 |

William Hill Laurels, Belle Vue (Oct 26, 465m, £10,000)
| Pos | Name of Greyhound | Trainer | SP | Time | Trap |
|---|---|---|---|---|---|
| 1st | Ningbo Jack | Charlie Lister | 4-1 | 27.60 | 5 |
| 2nd | Laser Beam | Harry Williams | 16-1 | 27.86 | 3 |
| 3rd | Under the Kosh | Liz McNair | 9-2 | 27.99 | 1 |
| 4th | Redbank Classic | Joy Andrews | 33-1 | 28.37 | 2 |
| 5th | Bally Kee | Charlie Lister | 7-4f | 28.40 | 4 |
| 6th | Farloe Exit | Charlie Lister | 9-4 | 00.00 | 6 |

William Hill St Leger, Wimbledon (Nov 9, 668m, £13,000)
| Pos | Name of Greyhound | Trainer | SP | Time | Trap |
|---|---|---|---|---|---|
| 1st | Roxholme Girl | Hayley Keightly | 3-1 | 41.32 | 3 |
| 2nd | Shelbourne Star | Brian Clemenson | 5-2 | 41.79 | 4 |
| 3rd | Droopys Shearer | Ted Soppitt | 9-4f | 41.86 | 6 |
| 4th | Ballymac Kewell | Carly Philpott | 7-1 | 42.04 | 2 |
| 5th | Creamery Tex | Paul Garland | 33-1 | 42.11 | 1 |
| 6th | Farloe Divide | Charlie Lister | 5-1 | 42.19 | 5 |

Totesport Gold Collar, Belle Vue (Nov 25, 470m, £10,000)
| Pos | Name of Greyhound | Trainer | SP | Time | Trap |
|---|---|---|---|---|---|
| 1st | Roxholme Girl | Hayley Keightley | 4-6f | 39.01+ | 1 |
| 2nd | Clear Run | Charlie Lister | 14-1 | 39.99 | 3 |
| 3rd | Lissycasey Duke | Michael Donlon | 4-1 | 40.09 | 6 |
| 4th | Hayleys Boy | June McCombe | 7-1 | 40.24 | 4 |
| 5th | Machan Tiger | Phil McComish | 10-1 | 40.71 | 2 |
| 6th | Bonny Betty | Gary Carmichael | 7-1 | 40.77 | 5 |

+ Track record

William Hill Oaks, Wimbledon (Nov 30, 480m, £6,000)
| Pos | Name of Greyhound | Trainer | SP | Time | Trap |
|---|---|---|---|---|---|
| 1st | Tidyplayroom | Derek Knight | 5-1 | 29.27 | 1 |
| 2nd | One Yard | Andy Johnson | 5-2f | 29.40 | 6 |
| 3rd | Shebas Magic | Brian Clemenson | 9-2 | 29.44 | 4 |
| 4th | Fernglade Abby | Otto Kueres | 9-2 | 29.56 | 3 |
| 5th | Annes Honcho | Gary Baggs | 6-1 | 29.57 | 2 |
| 6th | Miss Siren | Ernie Gaskin Sr. | 4-1 | 29.91 | 5 |

=== Principal Irish finals ===
Donal Reilly Easter Cup Shelbourne (Apr 10, 525y, €50,000)
| Pos | Name of Greyhound | SP | Time | Trap |
|---|---|---|---|---|
| 1st | Premier Fantasy | 4-9f | 28.08 | 2 |
| 2nd | Awesome Impact | 20-1 | 28.36 | 4 |
| 3rd | Indian Ruler | 4-1 | 28.50 | 6 |
| 4th | Phoenix Ice | 20-1 | 28.67 | 1 |
| 5th | First Charter | 16-1 | 28.81 | 3 |
| 6th | Shantobar | 16-1 | 29.16 | 5 |

Red Mills Produce Clonmel (Apr 4, 525y, €30,000)
| Pos | Name of Greyhound | SP | Time | Trap |
|---|---|---|---|---|
| 1st | Geldrops Touch | 6-4jf | 28.56 | 4 |
| 2nd | Geordie Legend | 7-1 | 28.63 | 1 |
| 3rd | Walk With Fire | 7-1 | 28.77 | 5 |
| 4th | Velvet Cash | 6-4jf | 28.91 | 6 |
| 5th | Dunsany | 16-1 | 28.98 | 2 |
| 6th | Zigzag Mansell | 33-1 | 29.01 | 3 |

Ladbrokes 600 Shelbourne (May 8, 600y, €35,000)
| Pos | Name of Greyhound | SP | Time | Trap |
|---|---|---|---|---|
| 1st | Awesome Impact | 11-4 | 32.44 | 2 |
| 2nd | Great Lark | 20-1 | 32.45 | 3 |
| 3rd | Valentia Citrate | 3-1 | 32.55 | 6 |
| 4th | Karma Knight | 7-4f | 32.57 | 4 |
| 5th | Velvet Cash | 7-1 | 32.75 | 1 |
| 6th | The Other Domino | 20-1 | 32.76 | 5 |

Kerry Agribusiness Irish St Leger Limerick (Jul 4, 550y, €35,000)
| Pos | Name of Greyhound | SP | Time | Trap |
|---|---|---|---|---|
| 1st | Never Give Up | 7-1 | 29.88 | 4 |
| 2nd | Blue Panther | 14-1 | 29.90 | 6 |
| 3rd | Farloe Cricketer | 5-1 | 30.04 | 3 |
| 4th | Tomsheaboy (Pa Fitzgerald) | 1-1f | 30.14 | 5 |
| 5th | Go Ahead Honcho | 9-1 | 30.16 | 1 |
| 6th | Persian Ruler | 3-1 | 30.48 | 2 |

Vodafone Corn Cuchulainn Harold's Cross (Jul 9, 750y, €50,000)
| Pos | Name of Greyhound | SP | Time | Trap |
|---|---|---|---|---|
| 1st | Smiling Man | 7-2 | 41.62 | 4 |
| 2nd | Air Force Honcho | 3-1jf | 42.46 | 5 |
| 3rd | Won't You Stay | 5-1 | 42.60 | 1 |
| 4th | Moss Time | 7-1 | 42.70 | 6 |
| 5th | Bins Image | 5-1 | 43.12 | 3 |
| 6th | Special Trick | 3-1jf | 43.26 | 2 |

Sporting Press Oaks Shelbourne (Jul 17, 525y, €35,000)
| Pos | Name of Greyhound | SP | Time | Trap |
|---|---|---|---|---|
| 1st | Legal Moment (Pat Buckley) | 2-1f | 28.59 | 3 |
| 2nd | Page Three Girl (Mick O'Reilly) | 33-1 | 28.94 | 4 |
| 3rd | Graigues Echo (Jim Morrissey) | 10-1 | 28.96 | 2 |
| 4th | Things To Do (Patrick O'Brien) | 4-1 | 29.03 | 6 |
| 5th | Side Saga (Stephen Bourke) | 9-4 | 29.10 | 1 |
| 6th | Greenlough Slip (Owen McKenna) | 7-1 | 29.27 | 5 |

Boylesports Champion Stakes Shelbourne (Jul 31, 550y, €40,000)
| Pos | Name of Greyhound | SP | Time | Trap |
|---|---|---|---|---|
| 1st | Never Give Up | 4-1 | 29.90 | 2 |
| 2nd | Smiling Man | 6-1 | 29.93 | 5 |
| 3rd | Disguised | 7-2 | 29.94 | 4 |
| 4th | World Class | 5-1 | 30.05 | 1 |
| 5th | Tomsheaboy | 6-4f | 30.06 | 6 |
| N/R | Velvet Commander | | | 3 |

Droopys Stud & Donal Reilly Puppy Derby Harolds Cross (Oct 15, 525y, €50,000)
| Pos | Name of Greyhound | SP | Time | Trap |
|---|---|---|---|---|
| 1st | Droopys Brooklyn | 6-1 | 29.17 | 1 |
| 2nd | Dairyland Bandit | 14-1 | 29.24 | 4 |
| 3rd | Albino | 7-1 | 29.38 | 5 |
| 4th | He Said So | 4-7f | 29.52 | 3 |
| 5th | Cals Tonic | 5-1 | 29.53 | 2 |
| N/R | Mandys Cheeky | | | 6 |

Cashmans Laurels Cork (Oct 30, 525y, €35,000)
| Pos | Name of Greyhound | SP | Time | Trap |
|---|---|---|---|---|
| 1st | Boherduff Light | 2-1jf | 28.44 | 2 |
| 2nd | Farloe Pocket | 2-1jf | 28.72 | 5 |
| 3rd | Jesceda Lad | 6-1 | 28.74 | 3 |
| 4th | Cavecourt Jon | 5-1 | 28.88 | 1 |
| 5th | Rhincrew Shergar | 12-1 | 29.05 | 6 |
| 6th | Tourna Star | 20-1 | 29.23 | 4 |
