= Brighton & Hove Greyhound Stadium =

British greyhound racing venue

Coordinates: 50°50′31.92″N 0°10′33.42″W

Brighton and Hove Greyhound Stadium
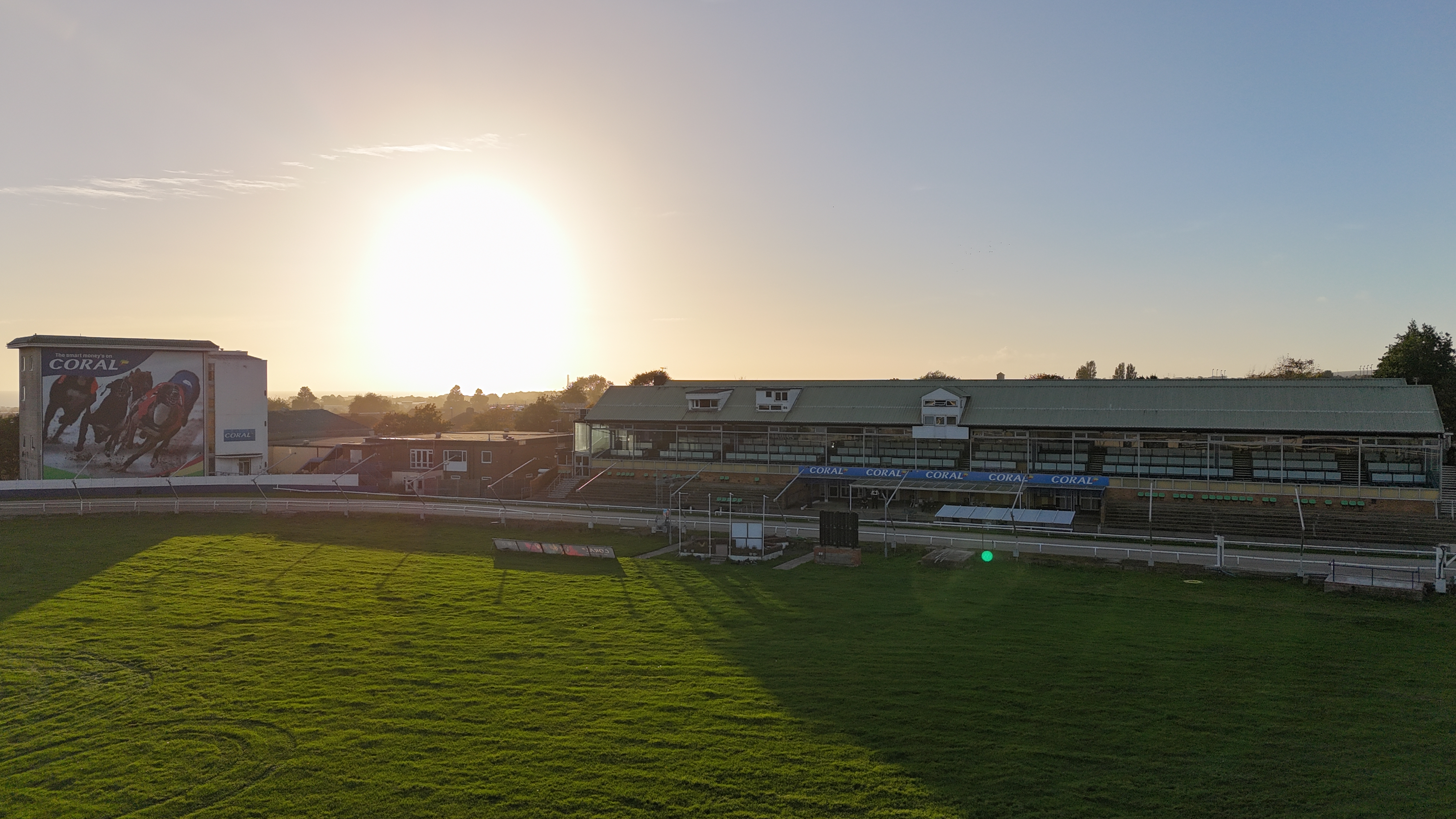
- The stadium in 2025
- Interactive map of Brighton and Hove Greyhound Stadium
- Location: Brighton and Hove
- Operator: Entain (Ladbrokes Coral)

Construction
- Opened: 1928

Tenant
- Greyhound racing

Website
- Official website

Brighton & Hove Greyhound Stadium is a greyhound racing track located in the Hove Park area of the city of Brighton and Hove, East Sussex. The stadium also has a restaurant and a number of bars and is owned by Entain and race meetings are held every Thursday and Saturday evening, in addition to two afternoon meetings on a Wednesday and Sunday as well as a morning meeting on a Friday.

== Category One Competitions ==
- Brighton Belle (1975 – present)
- Regency (1948 – present)
- Sussex Cup (1972 – present)
- Olympic (1947 – present)
- George Curtis & Ballyregan Bob Memorial (1994 – present)
- Gold Collar (2025 – present)

== Origins ==
The plans for the site on Nevill Road and adjoining Hove Park were unanimously passed by the Brighton Corporation in January 1928. Charles Wakeling, Freddie Arnold and Major Carlos Campbell instigated the construction and the Greyhound Racing Association (GRA) had shares in the company called the Greyhound Racing Association (Brighton) Ltd.

== Opening ==
The first race to be held at the track known as the Hove Sports Stadium was the Hove Stakes and took place on 2 June 1928. 'Costs' the 7-4f won the 525 yards race for trainer Toone and won £16 for his owner W. G. Hooper, who was a solicitor by trade.

== Pre-war history ==
Originally the track was primitive with the hare being wound around the course by hand and it took ten years of racing before electric lighting was installed. A hand-operated tote was installed in 1932 but suffered from the government ban on tote betting the same year until the Betting and Lotteries Act 1934 reversed the ban. In 1940 the resident kennels moved to Morley Lodge, Albourne, Henfield, West Sussex. This purpose built kennel facility for over 200 hounds offered a modern brick facility and each range had its own grass paddock. Breeding kennels were set up on a farm in Sussex and rearing kennels were built in nearby Cumberland. The circuit was described as easy swinging turns of 160 yards and short straights of 85 yards and distances were 310, 525, 565 and 800 yards with an 'Inside MacWhirter Trackless' hare. Amenities included a club in both enclosures (the Nevill Road Club and the Orchard Road Club) and there were dining facilities in the Grand enclosure.

== 1945–1980 ==
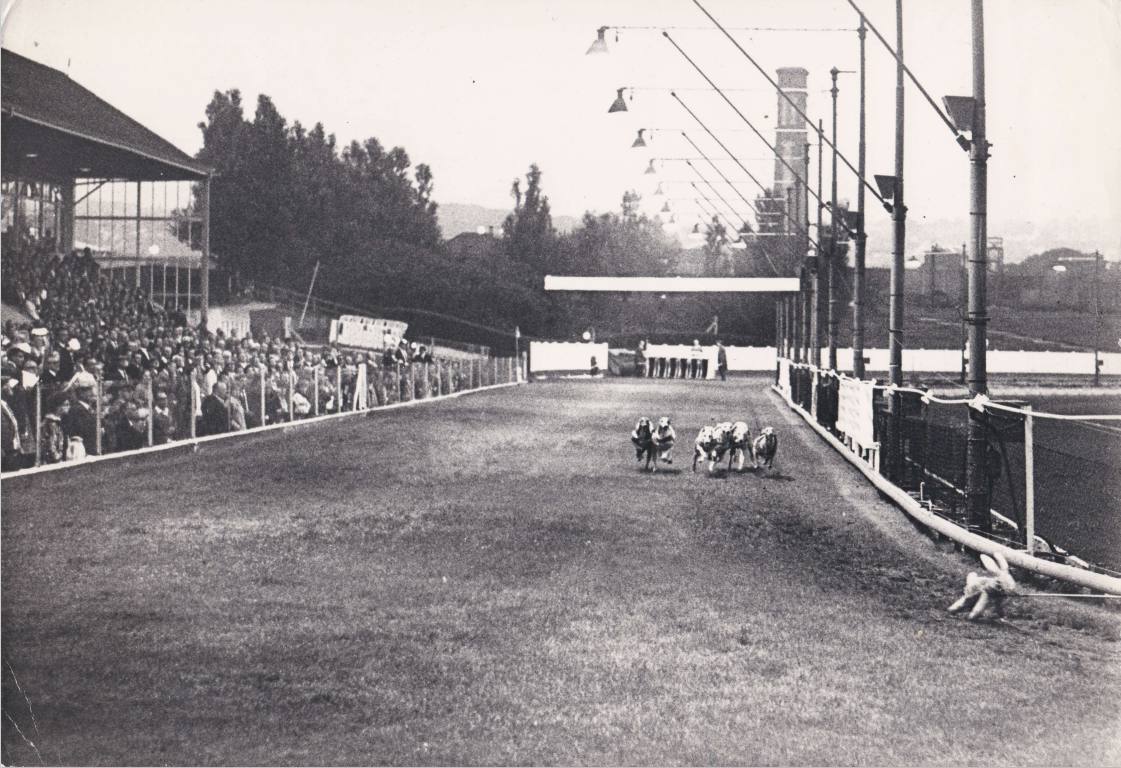
Greyhounds racing at Brighton c.1960

After the war the company was called the Brighton & Hove Stadium Ltd and in 1948 the stadium introduced a new event called the Regency. The Managing Director Charles Wakeling who was also the chairman of Brighton & Hove Albion F.C. died leaving the stadium in the hands of Major Carlos Campbell. Campbell died in 1958 leaving the controlling interest of the shares in the hands of the GRA. They brought in Gerard Kealey as General Manager and Peter Shotton as Racing Manager (the latter replacing Tom King in 1964) and the pair went about building up the reputation of the seaside track. During the sixties racing was held on Wednesday and Saturday evenings, in addition to the restaurant there was three buffet bars and seven licensed bars. The circumference had changed to 491 yards with distances of 550, 725 and 880 yards with an 'Inside Sumner' hare. The track trainers consisted of Fred Lugg, Arthur Hancock, Birch & Gunner (Charles George) Smith. The outside ‘McGee’ hare was later introduced when the bends were banked in the early 1970s. Gunner Smith steered Luxury Liner through to 1961 English Greyhound Derby Derby final.

George Curtis represented Brighton in two consecutive Greyhound Derby finals with Hard Held in 1969 and Sirius in 1970.

Brighton introduced travelling payments for open race trainers to encourage entries to travel south, and the Sussex Cup was inaugurated in 1972, followed by the Brighton Belle for bitches in 1975. In 1976 a significant deal was struck in when Coral Leisure purchasing Brighton and Romford. When Shotton moved to Wembley in 1978, Des Nichols, who had worked as his assistant for two years in the early 70s, was brought back in by the new Managing Director John Sutton as Racing Manager after successful stints at Rochester and sister track Romford. At this time, major investment was made by the new owners and the main stand was converted into a luxury restaurant that achieved notable popularity in the area. Jim Layton succeeded Nichols a few years later when the former was appointed Divisional Marketing Manager for Coral Stadia. A fourth major race called the Olympic was introduced in 1979.

== 1981–1999 ==
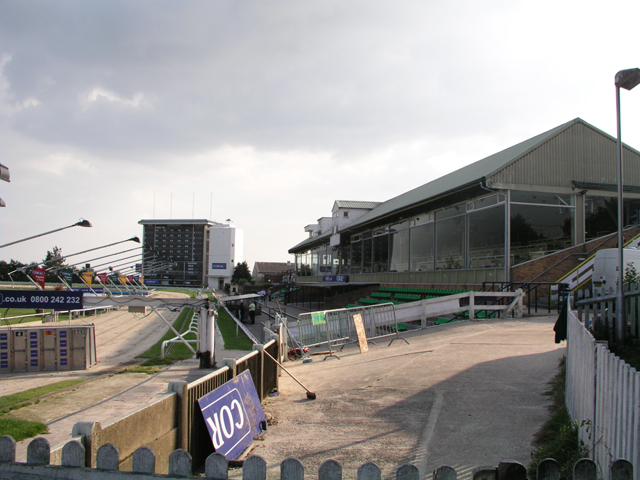
A view of the grandstand in 2007

George Curtis became a three times Greyhound Trainer of the Year winning the title in 1983, 1984 and 1986. Brighton greyhound Ballyregan Bob trained by Curtis became a household name after breaking the world record in 1986 by winning 32 consecutive races. One year later the stadium became the last course in Britain to remove their turf surface changing to all-sand. Gerard Kealey died in 1989 and Peter Shotton became general manager (he had returned to Brighton from Wembley).

In 1991 Coral announced that their greyhound tracks would be sold to fund the purchase of 73 bingo halls from Granada Theatre Ltd, but, despite the deal being struck and subsequent birth of Gala Bingo, the tracks remained under the ownership of Coral. However, Coral did lose a court case around the same time to the Alliance & Leicester, forcing them to relinquish land where the Orchard Road enclosure stood. A new generation of trainers arrived at Hove in the 1990s. Brian Clemenson was three times champion trainer, and his assistant Alan (Claude) Gardiner replaced Bill Masters when he retired. Peter Miller replaced Jim Layton as racing manager in 1994.

== 2000–present ==
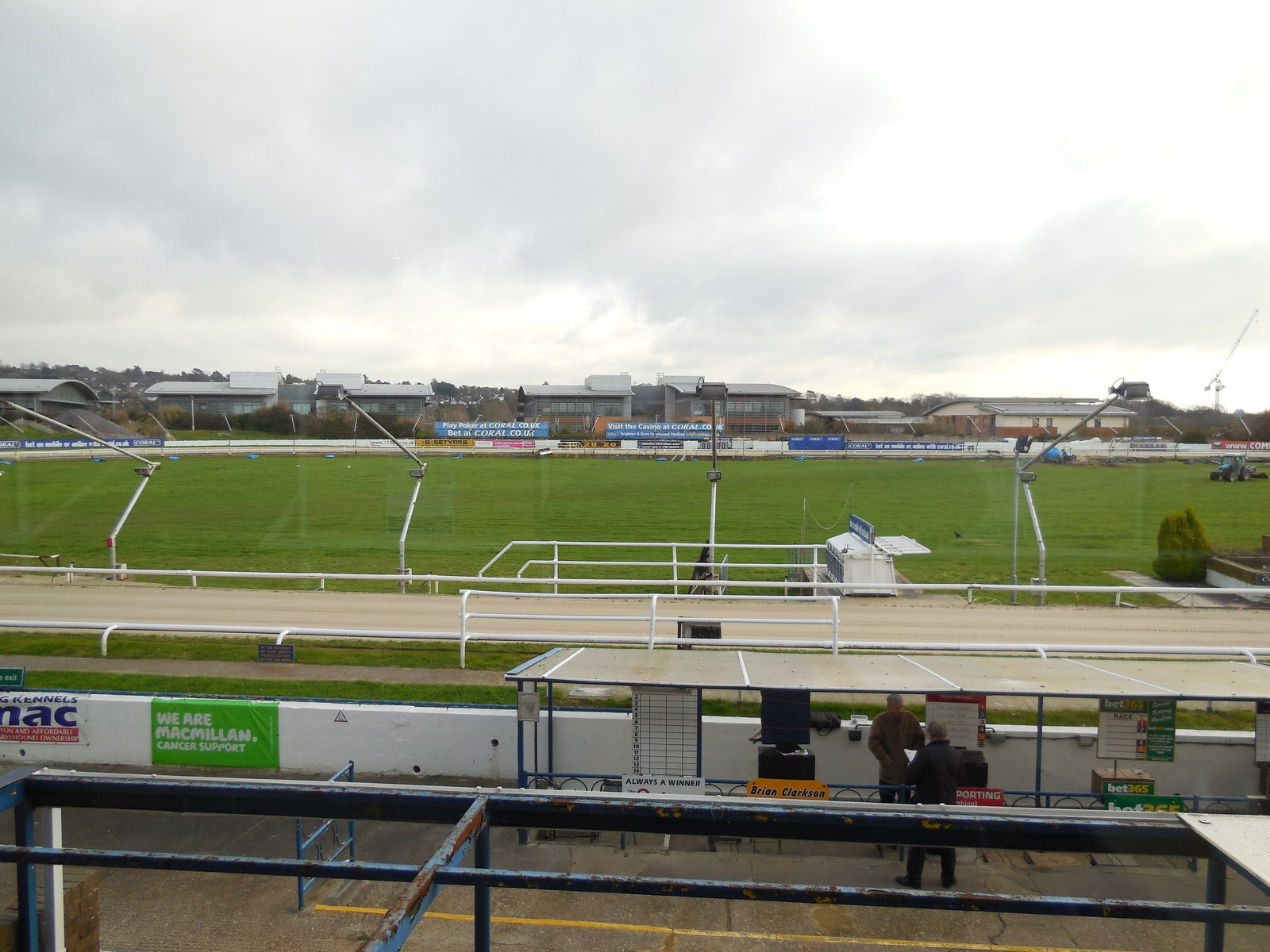
The track in 2013

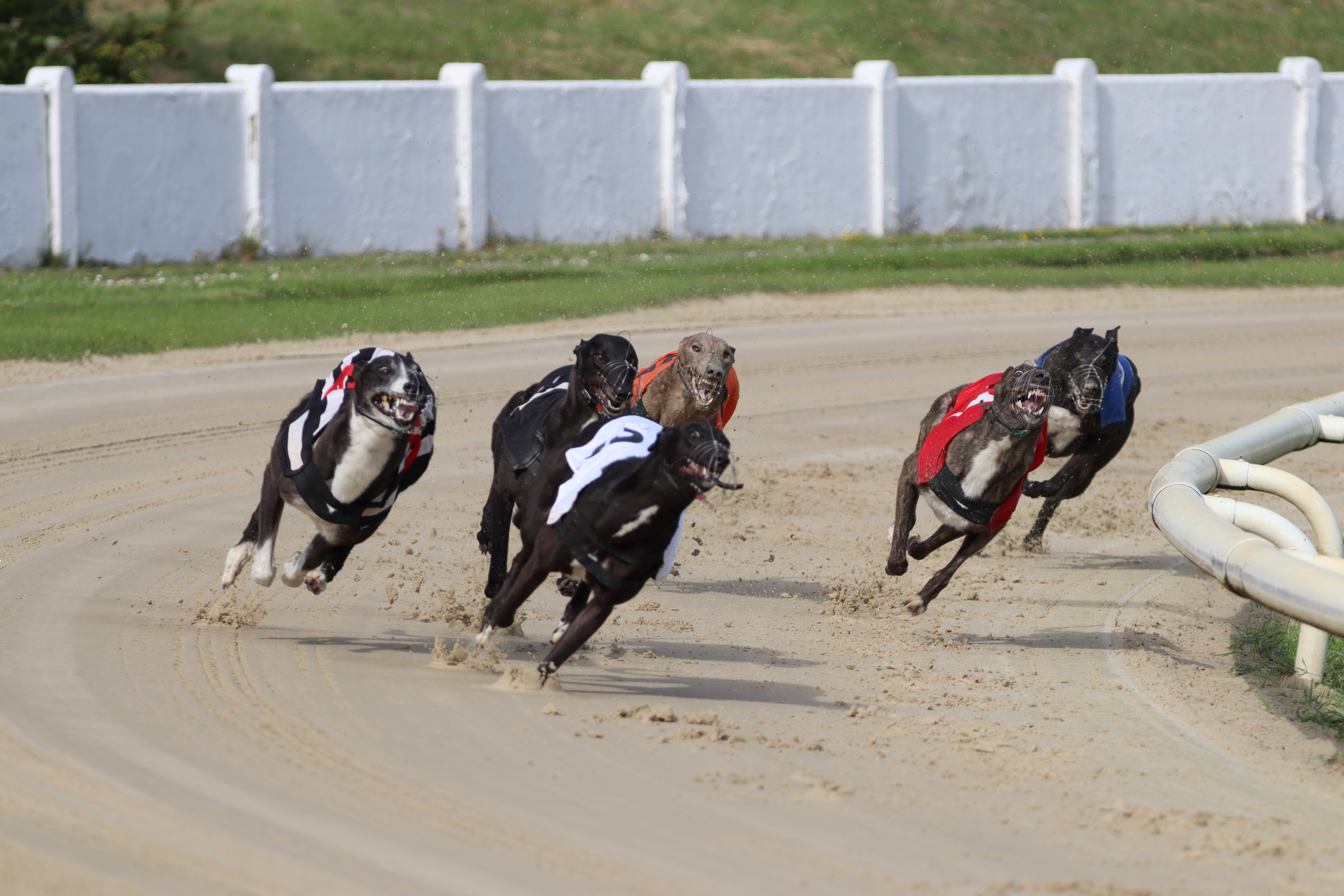
Greyhounds racing at the track in 2024

Brian Clemenson was three times champion trainer in 2003, 2004 and 2005. The track remains one of the premier venues in the country and attracts some of the best trainers in the country including recent acquisitions Seamus Cahill and Norah McEllistrim. In 2018 the stadium signed a deal with SIS to race every Tuesday and Wednesday afternoon, Friday morning, and every Thursday and Saturday evening.

In 2019 the track created new race distance of 500 metres; the track had previously raced over that distance in the 1970s. The 515 distance was retained for open races.

In 2022, Entain signed a long term deal with the Arena Racing Company for media rights, starting in January 2024. The stadium now opens every Wednesday and Sunday afternoon, Friday morning, and Thursday and Saturday evening.

== Opposition ==
The track is the subject of opposition from activists opposed to greyhound racing on animal welfare grounds. Local campaign group Close Hove Dog Track stage regular protests outside the stadium, aiming to secure its closure.

== Track records ==
=== Current records ===
Metres	Greyhound	Time	Date	Notes/ref
285	Jimmy Lollie	15.89	7 October 2010	
285	Target Harris	15.89	12 June 2014	
475	Southfield Jock	27.42	22 October 2015	
475	Forest Con	27.42	3 May 2017	
500	Proper Heiress	28.57	26 October 2025	Gold Collar heat
515	Barnfield On Air	29.20	31 July 2007	Sussex Cup final
695	Caloona Striker	40.73	21 June 2005	
740	Form of Magic	43.59	30 March 2002	
945	Aayamza Royale	57.90	12 December 2020	TV Trophy heats
955	Space Jet	58.35	2 April 2022	TV Trophy semi final
500 H	Droopys Chaser	29.67	29 July 2023	Springbok final

=== Former records ===
Metres	Greyhound	Time	Date	Notes
285	Fell Swoop	16.55	1987+	grass
285	Ard Boxer	16.48	1988+	sand
285	I Will Whisper	16.38	1989+	
285	Ravage Again	16.35	30 August 1990	Etherington Sprint heats
285	Ravage Again	16.27	4 September 1990	Etherington Sprint final
285	Escort Captain	16.11	11 July 2000	
285	Smoking Jonesey	16.29	2002+	
285	Setemup Joe	16.20	22 March 2003	
285	Tims Crow	16.05	22 May 2003	
285	Jimmy Lollie	16.02	13 August 2009	
285	Jimmy Lollie	15.94	17 July 2010	
475	Droopys Candice	27.67	24 July 2001	
475	Swift Star	27.47	1 August 2002	
475	Cash the Deal	27.47	26 July 2003	
490	Droopys Gold	28.38	27 December 2018	
490	Trade Fudge	28.24	31 January 2019	
500	Linacre	28.99	1976+	National record
500	Balliniska Band	28.99	1977+	
500	Mondays Bran	28.96	1979+	Sussex Cup final & world record
500	Antigua Romeo	28.86	23 January 2020	
500	Candolim Monsoon	28.69	3 October 2024	
515	Glen Miner	29.62	4 May 1982	grass & Olympic Final
515	John Doe	30.14	1988+	sand
515	Hit The Lid	29.73	30 July 1988	
515	Iceman Joey	29.46	19 July 2002	
515	Buy the Mystery	29.41	21 August 2003	
515	Ballybrazil Hero	29.27	20 July 2004	Sussex Cup Heats
670	Westmead Champ	39.78	1976+	Regency Final
680	Fair Reward	40.30	1980+	
680	Glin Bridge	39.94	1976+	
695	Ballyregan Bob	41.13	2 November 1985	grass
695	Ballyregan Bob	42.04	9 December 1986	sand
695	Olivers Wish	41.57	August 1988	
695	Waltham Abbey	41.21	31 August 1989	
695	Killeacle Phoebe	41.10	21 April 2001	
695	Form of Magic	40.82	26 March 2002	Trainers Championship
695	Centour Corker	40.74	8 May 2003	
725	Glin Fane		1978	
725	Princess Glin	43.22	1979	
740	Paradise Lost	44.65	March 1982	Regency final
740	Sundridge Bet	44.42	8 July 1982	
740	Apache Warrior	44.15	1987	grass
740	Ballyregan Bob	44.62	1988	sand
740	Life Policy	44.35	1988+	
740	Sail On Valerie	44.29	5 May 1990	
740	Mobile Magic	44.24	1992+	
740	Lady Flyaway	44.20	21 August 1997	
930	Kegans Gold	56.88	24 July 2001	
930	Centour Corker	56.29	3 June 2003	
930	Greenacre Lin	56.20	8 June 2004	
930	Roxholme Magic	56.18	30 July 2015	
955	Langford Dacoit	58.46	1978+	grass
955	Antigua Lava	58.60	31 July 2021	
955	Blueberry Bullet	58.60	2 April 2022	TV Trophy semi final
970	Sandy Lane	59.66	20 August 1983	
970	Huntsmans Nippy	59.59	1987+	grass
970	Comeragh Larch	61.20	1988+	sand
970	Saquita	59.99	27 July 1989	
970	Marys Gem	59.56	14 September 1997	
500 H	Wotch It Buster	29.71	1978+	
515 H	Sir Winston	30.47	1987+	grass
515 H	Ozarks Warrior	30.89	1988+	sand
515 H	Lord Westlands	30.49	5 November 1988	
515 H	Group Tycoon	30.78	24 July 2001	
515 H	Group Tycoon	30.39	15 September 2001	
515 H	Greenacre George	30.08	1 August 2002	
515 H	Junior Mac	29.83	27 July 2010	
680 H	Across The Miles	41.43	1979+	
695 H	August Monday	42.86	1987+	grass
695 H	Mixer Mick	44.06	1988+	sand
695 H	Mixer Mick	43.13	1988+	
695 H	Razmac Dancer	42.95	1989+	

+ Record holder during year

=== Pre metric ===
Yards	Greyhound	Time	Date	Notes
310	Four-Mile Bridge	17.14	9 June 1937	
525	Jesmond Cutlet	29.36	10 July 1938	
525	Good Worker	29.31	1948	
525	Kings Signature	29.24	05.1949	Regency final
525	Trabolgan Star	29.11	1956	
525	Kans	28.71	14 September 1963	
525	Carry on Hasty	28.32	1973+	
525	Easy Investment	28.17	30 June 1973	World and National record
550	Woodvilles Fury	30.09	20 September 1965	
550	Noble Pride		21 April 1966	
550	Hard Held	29.77	1970	
565	Bella	31.82	April 1934	
565	Roving Spring	31.61	14 September 1936	
565	Raths Record	31.50	1949	
725	Ballyhandy Cedar	40.48	15 September 1965	
725	Deneholme Flash	40.20	12 July 1969	
800	Grosvenor Edwin	46.35	15 August 1938	
880	Joyful C	50.70	12 April 1961	
880	Spectre II	50.09	25 April 1967	Sportsview Television Trophy
1041	Hi There Snow	60.19	1970	
310 H	Nakomis II	18.11	23 October 1937	
500 H	Conna Chief	30.99	1970+	
525 H	Wooteys Kingmaker	30.39	12 August 1938	
535 H	Athea Lad	30.34	21 July 1948	
550 H	Blue Sprite	31.14	25 August 1965	
565 H	Sammys Adventure	32.61	29 August 1931	
