= George Curtis (greyhound trainer) =

English professional greyhound trainer (1923–2020)

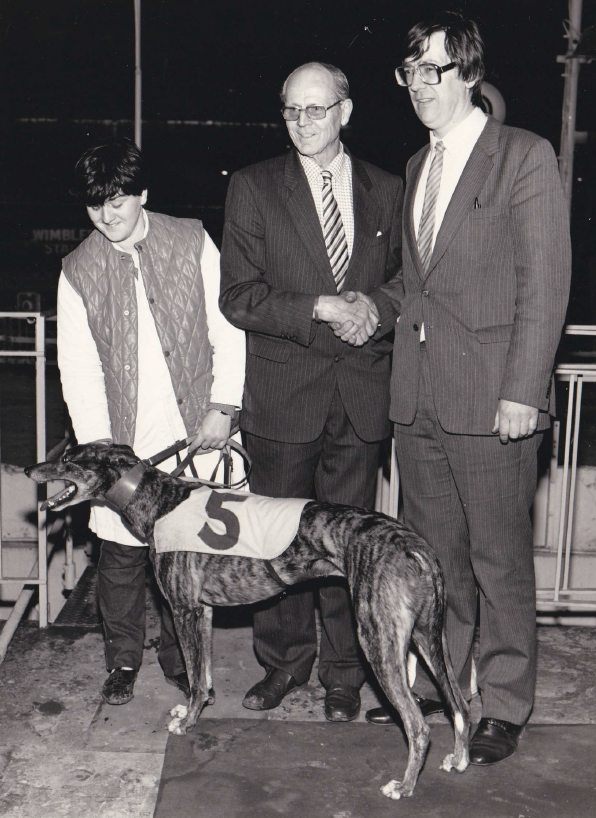
- George Curtis (centre), Bob Rowe (right) and Ballyregan Bob

Personal information
- Born: 21 September 1923 Portsmouth, England
- Died: 17 April 2020 (aged 96)
- Occupation: Greyhound Trainer

Sport
- Sport: Greyhound racing

Achievements and titles
- National finals: Classic/Feature wins: St Leger (1950, 1986); Cesarewitch (1986); Oaks (1985); Grand National (1983, 1984); Grand Prix (1984); Gold Collar (1975); Scurry Gold Cup (1977, 1982, 1983, 1984); Television Trophy (1973, 1983)

Frederick "George" Curtis (21 September 1923 – 17 April 2020) was an English greyhound trainer. He was a three times UK champion Greyhound Trainer of the Year.

== Profile ==
Curtis started as a kennelhand at Portsmouth Stadium with trainer Bill Peters in 1937 at the age of 14, and received his first National Greyhound Racing Club trainer's licence in 1944. The first classic race success of his career came with Fawn Mack during the 1950 St Leger, whilst attached to Park Royal Stadium.

A move to Brighton Stadium from Portsmouth in 1967 catapulted Curtis into continued success, his position at Portsmouth was taken by his brother Charlie. He trained a greyhound in two Derby finals, Hard Held in the 1969 English Greyhound Derby and Sirius in the 1970 English Greyhound Derby. He was propelled to industry fame after training Yankee Express and then national fame as the trainer of world record holder Ballyregan Bob. Curtis retired in 1987 handing the kennels and licence to Bill Masters. Curtis died on 17 April 2020, at the age of 96.

== Awards ==
Curtis won the Greyhound Trainer of the Year three times; in 1983, 1984 and 1986 and the Trainers Championship in 1984. He had the nickname 'Gentleman George' and in 2017 he was given the honour of being named in the Trafalgar Cup title.
