= 1966 Irish Greyhound Derby =

- Venue: Shelbourne Park
- Location: Dublin
- End date: 6 August
- Total prize money: £2,000 (winner)

The 1966 Irish Greyhound Derby took place during July and August with the final being held at Shelbourne Park in Dublin on 6 August 1966.

The winner Always Proud won £2,000 and was trained by Gay McKenna and owned and bred by Albert Lucas.

== Final result ==
At Shelbourne, 6 August (over 525 yards):

Position	Winner	Breeding	Trap	SP	Time	Trainer
1st	Always Proud	Clonalvy Pride - Always A Rebel	1	11-8f	29.44	Gay McKenna
2nd	Tiger Chief	Knockhill Chieftain - Last Landing	5	9-2	29.56	Gay McKenna
3rd	Val's Prince	Oregon Prince - Val's Orphan	6	7-4	29.59	Paddy Turbridy
4th	Cairnville Chief	Man Of Pleasure - Just Sherry	3	100-8		Leslie McNair
5th	Newrath Dancer	Hi There - Miss Congo	2	100-7		J McGuinness
6th	Can Trap	Odd Venture - Russell Ville	4	50-1		T O'Rourke

=== Distances ===
1½, neck (lengths)

== Competition Report ==
The fastest first round winners were the joint ante-post favourites, McAlinden cup winner Newrath Wonder and the Gay McKenna trained Always Proud, they won in 29.48 and 29.49 respectively, followed closely by 1965 Irish Greyhound Derby finalist Val's Prince in 29.60.

In the second round Val's Prince won in an extremely fast 29.10 and Always Proud recorded 29.19, but in a major shock Newrath Wonder was eliminated.

Vals Prince lost his semi-final to Newrath Dancer the litter brother to Newrath Wonder but still qualified for the final. The remaining two semi-finals went to Tiger Chief from Cairnville Chief and Always Proud from Can Trap. Gay McKenna's Monalee Champion went out at this stage but would become a major breeding success.

Always Proud the 5-4 favourite duly obliged in the final to seal a second successive victory for Gay McKenna. The brindle dog had been knocked out of the 1965 Irish Derby in the third round after which his English owner Albert Lucas put him with Gay McKenna. Failure a year later in the English Derby second round was put down to him being off-colour (sick) before he returned to Ireland. A brilliant three way battle ended with Always Proud beating Tiger Chief and Vals Prince. The Derby trophy was presented by Charles Haughey.

Val's Prince gained revenge on Always Proud later in the year when winning the Guinness 600 by three lengths from his rival.

== See also ==
- 1966 UK & Ireland Greyhound Racing Year
