= 1973 Irish Greyhound Derby =

- Venue: Shelbourne Park
- Location: Dublin
- End date: 28 August
- Total prize money: £10,000 (winner)

The 1973 Irish Greyhound Derby took place during July and August with the final being held at Shelbourne Park in Dublin on 28 August 1973.

The Irish Derby winner's prize was doubled to £10,000 by sponsors P.J.Carroll and Co. The winner Bashful Man won £10,000 and was trained by Ger McKenna, owned by Deirdre Hynes and bred by Nancy Dirrane.

== Final result ==
At Shelbourne, 28 August (over 525 yards):

Position	Winner	Breeding	Trap	SP	Time	Trainer
1st	Bashful Man	Myross Again – Ballyflake	6	4-5f	28.82	Ger McKenna
2nd	Ritas Choice	Spectre II - Toffee Apple II	5		29.14	Gay McKenna
3rd	Heavy Sleeper	Monalee Champion - Handbag	1		29.30	
unplaced	Black Banjo	Monalee Champion - Brook Densel	2			Mick Collins
unplaced	Kal's Daisy	Russian Gun - Woodbrook Blonde	3	20-1		
unplaced	Its A Witch	Yanka Boy - Itsamint	4			

=== Distances ===
4, 2 (lengths)

== Competition Report ==
In the first round, a leading bitch called Romping To Work won her race in a very fast time of 29.05, she would go on to win the Oaks later that year. Bashful Man recorded a win in 29.13 and Kilmac Chieftain in 29.23. Ante-post favourite Shara Dee who had won the English Derby consolation won in 29.55 and the Cesarewitch and recent TV Trophy winner Ritas Choice recovered from encountering trouble in running to finish second behind Moordyk Ringo.

English hope Black Banjo took up the mantle of the new competition favourite following a second round victory in a heat that included both Ritas Choice and Bashful Man. Shara Dee and China Sea remained unbeaten.

Bashful Man produced 29.01 victory in the quarter-finals propelling Ger McKenna's charge to the new favourite. Both Romping To Work and Shara Dee were eliminated but Ritas Choice won.

In the first semi-final Bashful Man recorded 29.15 when beating Ritas Choice and Kal's Daisy before Black Banjo wrapped up the second semi-final from Heavy Sleeper and Itsawitch in 29.58.

The final turned out to be one of the most memorable of all time because Bashful Man became the first greyhound to break 29 seconds in a final. He took a rails course at the first bend and overtook fast starter Kal's Daisy, before drawing clear of the field and winning in a time of 28.82, just two spots off the track record set by 1972 finalist Ballykilty.

== See also ==
- 1973 UK & Ireland Greyhound Racing Year
