= 1969 Irish Greyhound Derby =

Irish greyhound race

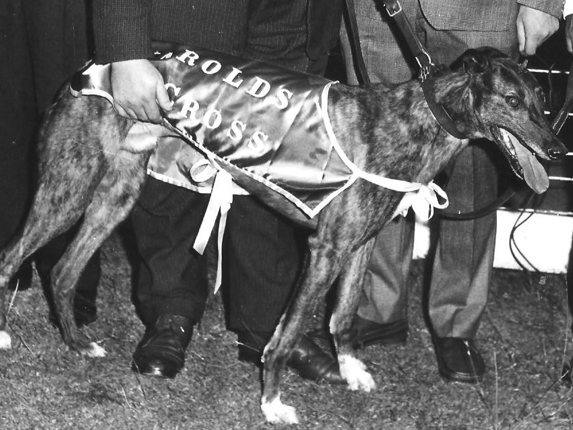
- Own Pride
- Venue: Harold's Cross Stadium
- Location: Dublin
- End date: 8 August
- Total prize money: £2,000 (winner)

The 1969 Irish Greyhound Derby took place during July and August with the final being held at Harold's Cross Stadium in Dublin on 8 August 1969.

The winner Own Pride won £2,000 and was trained by Ger McKenna and owned by Tom O'Doherty.

It was the last Derby to be run at Harolds Cross following the decision by the Bord na gCon to keep the race at Shelbourne Park.

== Final result ==
At Harold's Cross, 8 August (over 525 yards):

Position	Winner	Breeding	Trap	SP	Time	Trainer
1st	Own Pride	Always Proud – Kitty True	2	6/4f	29.20	Ger McKenna
2nd	Monalee Gambler	Prairie Flash – Sheila At Last	1	3/1	29.40	Tom Lynch
3rd	Quakerfield King	Quiet Spring – Wax Happy	5	9/1	29.64	Dessie Gilroy
4th	Finolas Yarn	Sally's Yarn – Finola	4	3/1		Gay McKenna
5th	Colonel Flash	Greenane Flash – Litle Rattler	6	100/6		
6th	Kilbelin Grand	Prairie Flash – Clomoney Grand	3	10/1		Gay McKenna

=== Distances ===
2½, 3 (lengths)

== Competition summary ==
The 1969 English Greyhound Derby winner Sand Star was the leading entry for the Irish Derby in 1969. The black and white dog was quickly installed as ante post favourite with McAlinden Cup winner Johnnys Dream, Trigo Cup winner Bill of Sale and It's A Mint next in line in the betting. In the first round, both Sand Star and It's A Mint both failed to progress. Rich Tea went fastest in 29.25 and there were good wins for Kilbelin Grand and English star Discretions.

The second round resulted in wins for Own Pride, Camira Prince and Quakerfield King but Johnnys Dream was eliminated.

In the semi-finals a battle between Own Pride and Finolas Yarn for the second time in the competition saw both qualify for the final followed by Colonel Flash and Quakerfield King booking their spots in the second semi-final. The final heat went to the Tom Lynch trained Monalee Gambler from Kilbelin Grand.

The final line up contained two stand-out runners in Own Pride and Finolas Yarn but instead of a third head to head battle between the pair it was Monalee Gambler who broke well and went into the lead. Own Pride pulled him back by the third bend, going on to win by two and a half lengths. Kilbelin Grand died shortly after the race from heart failure.

The winning trainer was Ger McKenna, cousin of Gay McKenna.

== See also ==
- 1969 UK & Ireland Greyhound Racing Year
