= 1970 Irish Greyhound Derby =

- Venue: Shelbourne Park
- Location: Dublin
- End date: 8 August
- Total prize money: £5,000 (winner)

The 1970 Irish Greyhound Derby took place during July and August with the final being held at Shelbourne Park in Dublin on 8 August 1970.

There was a major breakthrough for the Irish Derby after it received sponsorship from P.J.Carroll and Co, a cigarette company who contributed £3,500 towards the event. The first prize carried a valuable £5,000 and the competition itself had £8,460 prize money in total.

The winner Monalee Pride won £5,000 and was trained by Gay McKenna, owned by Dave Cahill and bred by Bertie Hatton.

== Final result ==
At Shelbourne, 8 August (over 525 yards):

| Position | Winner | Breeding | Trap | SP | Time | Trainer |
|---|---|---|---|---|---|---|
| 1st | Monalee Pride | Prairie Flash - Sheila At Last | 4 | 4-1 | 29.28 | Gay McKenna |
| 2nd | Own Pride | Always Proud - Kitty True | 1 | 11-8f | 29.48 | Ger McKenna |
| 3rd | Menelaus | Prairie Flash - Pride of Corrin | 6 | | | Tom Lynch |
| unplaced | Ballyhandy Duke | Czarevitch - Ballyhandy Rose | 5 | | | Danny Kelly |
| unplaced | Geraldine Silver | The Grand Silver - Cindico | 3 | | | L Cullen |
| unplaced | Fly Ally | Fly Adeli - Craigmore Ally | 2 | | | Robert Shaw |

=== Distances ===
2½ (lengths)

== Competition Report ==
With the significant rise in prize money the Irish Derby became a major target for UK connections in addition to the Irish greyhounds. The 1970 competition drew in large crowds for all rounds which included trial stakes run at different tracks around Ireland with the winners of the races receiving free entry for the main event. All 22 Irish tracks North and South of the border carried a qualifying trial stake.

The defending champion Own Pride returned for trainer Ger McKenna and was installed as the 7-1 ante-post favourite. McAlinden Cup champion Ballyhandy Duke trained by Danny Kelly was considered a major contender but the expected competition from England was missing following a rabies scare. Chicago based Dave Cashman entered Monalee Pride following the brindle dog's disappointing National Produce Stakes campaign. Monalee Pride and his litter mates had cost Cashman £4,000 to buy.

It was Own Pride that showed first in round one after winning in a fast 29.40 which shortened his odds further. Ballyhandy Duke went well in 29.46 and other winners that impressed included Brendas Pick 29.50, Geraldine Silver 29.55 and Blackrath Motion 29.67.

The second round nearly provided the end of Own Pride who just managed third place behind Deise Slipper. Monalee Pride 29.44 and the Tom Lynch trained Menelaus 29.48 went fastest.

In the semi-final Own Pride bounced back to winning ways beating Geraldine Silver in 29.38. A great battle in the second semi-final ended with Ballyhandy Duke beating Monalee Pride in 29.58 and the final semi saw Menelaus defeat Fly Ally.

Own Pride gained the perfect trap draw for the final starting from the red jacket and went off at a hot 11-8 favourite. When the traps opened Monalee Pride led unchallenged until the back straight when Own Pride got himself into a prominent position to challenge the leader. Monalee Pride kicked again to win the Derby for Gay McKenna; Own Pride come home second followed by Menelaus.

== See also ==
- 1970 UK & Ireland Greyhound Racing Year
