= 1982 Irish Greyhound Derby =

- Venue: Shelbourne Park
- Location: Dublin
- Start date: 9 July
- End date: 24 July
- Total prize money: £25,500 (winner)

The 1982 Irish Greyhound Derby took place during June and July with the final being held at Shelbourne Park in Dublin on 24 July 1982.

The winner Cooladine Super won £25,500 and was trained by Colm and Mary McGrath and owned by Siobhan Kenny. The competition was sponsored by Carrolls.

Cooladine Super was retired to stud the following month.

== Final result ==
At Shelbourne, 24 July (over 525 yards):

Position	Winner	Breeding	Trap	SP	Time	Trainer
1st	Cooladine Super	Tranquility Sea - Cooladine Ruby	6	2-1f	29.34	Colm & Mary McGrath
2nd	Milwaukee Prince	Nameless Star - Lovely Blend	4		29.38	Neilus Buckley
3rd	Rushwee Heights	Blackers Height - Young Tina	1		29.52	Maureen Hurley
4th	Bolton Prince	Hunday Champion - Virgil Kane	5		29.74	Paddy Keane
5th	Lisbryan Gent	Liberty Lad - Kilcaragh Signal	2			Michael Conroy
6th	Supreme Tiger	Knockrour Tiger - Rising Tide	3	3-1		Matt O'Donnell

=== Distances ===
½, 1¾, 2¾ (lengths)

== Competition Report ==
Fearless Mover was sent over from England following a decent English Derby effort. Colm McGrath had purchased a greyhound called Cooladine Super for Charlie Kavanagh after the 1981 Irish Greyhound Derby and had high hopes for him because he had won the Dundalk International. Other leading Irish contenders included the Matt O'Donnell pair of Supreme Tiger and Brilliant Merry.

McGrath had a double in the first round with Kilacalla winning in 29.12 and Cooladine Super in 29.28. Supreme Tiger and Kool Dude also won their heats. The main English hope Fearless Mover was eliminated in round two but the other big names all won, Supreme Tiger went best in 29.18.

In one of the quarter-finals Supreme Tiger and Cooladine Super but Kool Dude was eliminated from the competition. There was a surprise in the first semi-final after Rushwee Heights defeated Supreme Tiger in 29.18. In the second semi-final a puppy called Milwaukee Prince won by 17 lengths after a terrible mess of a race, Lisbryan Gent claimed second place. Finally Cooladine Super gained victory from Bolton Prince.

In the final Supreme Tiger came away first from trap three but Cooladine Super drawn in a perfect trap six for the third consecutive race overtook him on the back straight. Milwaukee Prince, Bolton Prince and Rushwee Heights all started to make headway but Cooladine Super stayed on to win with Supreme Tiger fading badly. A post competition criticism was that only one trap one winner materialised in 46 races.

== See also ==
- 1982 UK & Ireland Greyhound Racing Year
