= 2022 Irish Greyhound Derby =

2022 edition of the Irish Greyhound Derby competition

2022 Boylesports Irish Greyhound Derby
- Location: Shelbourne Park
- Start date: Friday 19 August
- End date: Saturday 24 September
- Competitors: 156
- Total prize money: €300,000 (winner €125,000)

The 2022 Boylesports Irish Greyhound Derby took place during August and September 2022, with the final being held on 24 September at Shelbourne Park. The competition was sponsored by BoyleSports and the prize money purse was €300,000, of which €125,000 went to the winner.

The winner was a black dog called Born Warrior, trained and bred by Jennifer O'Donnell and owned by the Whatever-you-like Syndicate. O'Donnell continued the family legacy following on from her father Matt O'Donnell and mother Frances O'Donnell.

The ante post favourites were Ballinabola Ed at 10/1, Good Cody (Irish Sprint champion) and Romeo Magico English Derby champion at 12/1, Vincenzo and Coolavanny Hoffa at 14/1. The 2021 runner-up and finalists Singalong Sally, Explosive Boy and All About Ted were other leading names to compete, as were Priceless Jet, Kirby Memorial champion Swords Rex and Champion Stakes winner One Time Only.

The first round was held on 19 & 20 August, second round on 26 & 27 August, third round on 3 September, quarter finals on 10 September and semi finals on 17 September.

== Final result ==
At Shelbourne Park (over 550 yards):

Position	Greyhound	Breeding	Trap	Sectional	SP	Time	Comment	Trainer
1st	Born Warrior	Ballymac Best – Mountaylor Queen	5	3.39	11/2	29.53	FAw, ALed	Jennifer O'Donnell
2nd	Ballymac Finn	Droopys Sydney – Ballymac Petsy	4	3.41	4/1	29.56	QAw, FinWell	Liam Dowling
3rd	Crafty Kokoro	Droopys Sydney – Cockyorconfident	2	3.57	7/2	29.77	SAw, Blk3	Peter Divilly
4th	Callaway Pro Am	Skywalker Farloe – Bottle of Banter	1	3.44	7/4f	29.95	EvAw, RnOn	Owen McKenna
5th	Maries Wedding	Droopys Sydney – Ballymac Petsy	3	3.44	6/1	30.21	EvAw, Blk1	Keeley McGee
6th	Droopys Nice One	Droopys Sydney – Droopys Dance	6	3.67	12/1	30.26	VSAw, Crd3	Martin 'Murt' Leahy

=== Distances ===
½, 3, 2½, 2½, 2

(0.07 sec = one length)

== Quarter finals ==
Heat 1 (Sep 10)
Pos	Name	SP	Time
1st	Ballymac Finn	2/1f	29.59
2nd	Skywalker Barry	22/1	29.64
3rd	Gortkelly Nestor	22/1	29.69
4th	Tullig Raven	6/1	29.97
5th	Bockos Budsit	9/4	30.01
6th	Romeo Magico	9/4	30.08

Heat 2 (Sep 10)
Pos	Name	SP	Time
1st	Coolavanny Hoffa	1/1f	29.24
2nd	Cryptopunk	14/1	29.52
3rd	Vincenzo	3/1	29.59
4th	Callaway Masters	6/1	29.60
5th	Hoodoo Brown	4/1	29.74
6th	Savana Hero	33/1	29.88

Heat 3 (Sep 10)
Pos	Name	SP	Time
1st	Maries Wedding	3/1	29.44
2nd	Born Warrior	7/4f	29.47
3rd	Droopys Nice One	6/1	29.54
4th	Killeacle Phelps	28/1	29.72
5th	Droopys Gravy	16/1	29.73
6th	Barefoot Supremo	2/1	29.94

Heat 4 (Sep 10)
Pos	Name	SP	Time
1st	Callaway Pro Am	13/8	29.41
2nd	Crafty Kokoro	9/2	29.42
3rd	Explosive Boy	5/4f	29.70
4th	Bulletfromagun	12/1	29.75
5th	Clona Blu	40/1	30.38
6th	Annagh Bailey	12/1	00.00

== Semi finals ==
First semi final (Sep 17)
Pos	Name of Greyhound	SP	Time	Trainer
1st	Callaway Pro Am	5/1	29.64	McKenna
2nd	Crafty Kokoro	7/2	29.74	Divilly
3rd	Born Warrior	7/1	29.76	O'Donnell
4th	Coolavanny Hoffa	11/8f	29.83	O'Donovan
5th	Explosive Boy	4/1	29.94	Guilfoyle
6th	Cryptopunk	20/1	30.08	Holland

Second semi final (Sep 17)
Pos	Name of Greyhound	SP	Time	Trainer
1st	Ballymac Finn	11/10f	29.48	Dowling
2nd	Maries Wedding	5/2	29.65	McGee
3rd	Droopys Nice One	9/2	29.71	Leahy
4th	Gortkelly Nestor	8/1	29.78	Murray
5th	Skywalker Barry	9/1	29.92	O'Donovan
N/R	Vincenzo			Guilfoyle

== Competition report ==
The first round saw Good Cody return the fastest heat win with a 29.25 run and the main eliminations were Swords Rex, Gaston Pecas and Ballymac Fairone.

The second round started with a fast win from Coolavanny Hoffa in 29.13, followed by another Explosive Boy heat win which also resulted in One Time Only being eliminated. Two significant shocks were in heat 3 and the elimination of Singalong Sally and Good Cody fell in heat 8 but English Derby Champion Romeo Magico won heat 4. The second set of heats started with both Hello Hammond and Kildare going out of the competition. All About Ted and Vincenzo both won their heats before Raha Mofo was eliminated and Ballinabola Ed recorded 29.27 (the best of the night).

The third round started with Tullig Raven defeating Explosive Boy in 29.56. Romeo Magico continued his good form taking heat 2 (29.59) before Barefoot Supremo won in 29.66. Callaway Masters won the next heat, which also saw Priceless Jet eliminated and Crafty Kokoro claimed heat 5. The sixth heat looked like the strongest on paper and Owen McKenna completed a double with Callaway Pro Am, the white and white black dog would be the only remaining unbeaten greyhound by the end of the night. Coolavanny Hoffa took second place but both Ballinabola Ed and All About Ted failed to progress. Bockos Budsit won heat 7 and Vincenzo returned the fastest time of the night in the last heat (29.49).

The first quarter final went to Ballymac Finn in 29.59 but the challenge of Romeo Magico came to an end after the English Derby champion encountered problems at the first and third bends. The next heat went to Coolavanny Hoffa, who once again set the best time of the round in 29.24. Maries Wedding won her first race of the competition by winning heat 3 and Callaway Pro Am remained unbeaten after winning the last heat.

In the first semi final Callaway Pro Am continued his unbeaten run after a strong run from trap 4, coming from behind he caught and overtook both Born Warrior and Coolavanny Hoffa. The latter was forced to check behind Born Warrior which cost him his place in the competition because Crafty Kokoro finished strongly and denied the favourite a place in the final. The second semi final was missing Vincenzo so only five greyhounds competed. Ballymac Finn took advantage of the red box draw and held of the challenge of his sister Maries Wedding and the strong finishing Droopys Nice One.

In the final Born Warrior produced a surprise win by trapping well and leading all the way, he missed the crowding and held off the unlucky Ballymac Finn, who was involved in the first bend crowding. Crafty Kokoro was slow away, found trouble but still ran on strongly to claim third place from Callaway Pro Am, the latter unfortunately chose the final to end his five race Derby winning sequence, the trap one draw proved to be his downfall as he moved off at the first bend when in a prominent position. Maries Wedding bumped at the first bend and Droopys Nice One who missed the break were unable to get into the race.

== See also ==
- 2022 UK & Ireland Greyhound Racing Year
