= 1985 Irish Greyhound Derby =

- Venue: Shelbourne Park
- Location: Dublin
- End date: 21 September
- Total prize money: £25,000 (winner)

The 1985 Irish Greyhound Derby took place during August and September with the final being held at Shelbourne Park in Dublin on 21 September 1985.

The winner Tubbercurry Lad won £25,000 and was trained by Charlie Faul, owned by Michael Costelloe and bred by Charlie Faul. The competition was sponsored by Carrolls.

== Final result ==
At Shelbourne, 21 September (over 525 yards):

| Position | Winner | Breeding | Trap | SP | Time | Trainer |
|---|---|---|---|---|---|---|
| 1st | Tubbercurry Lad | Liberty Lad - Tubbercurry Nancy | 6 | 9-4f | 29.14 | Charlie Faul |
| 2nd | Manorville Sand | Sand Man - Westmead City | 4 | 5-1 | 29.38 | Paddy Doran |
| 3rd | Cast No Stones | Lax Law - Morning Frolics | 2 | 7-2 | 29.54 | Francie Murray |
| 4th | Jackie Come Home | Liberty Lad - Nearly Missed It | 1 | 7-2 | 29.70 | C O'Malley & P Mulclaire |
| 5th | Gastrognome | Come On Poucher - Lisk Inca | 3 | 8-1 | 29.86 | Paul McKenna |
| 6th | Lispopple Story | Liberty Lad - Lispopple Blast | 5 | 7-1 | 30.22 | Noel Kinsella |

=== Distances ===
3, 2, 2, 2, 4½ (lengths)

== Competition Report ==
1985 Shelbourne 600 winner Lispopple Story and Sir Hestor impressed in the first round with sub 29-second first round victories. Manorville Sand produced a very fast second round victory performance coming from behind Jackie Come Home to win in 28.96 and the English challenger Hong Kong Mike won in 29.00.

Cast No Stones (28.95), Tubbercurry Lad (29.14) and Gastrognome all won well in round three. In the semi-finals on slow going Lispopple Story beat Jackie Come Home in 29.73, Tubbercurry Lad defeated Manorville Sand in 29.40 and Cast No Stones sealed a win over Gastrognome in 29.37.

In the final Jackie Come Home drew trap one which spelled disaster for the field because she was a wide runner. As the traps opened the orange six jacket (trap colours were not the colours used today) of Tubbercurry Lad broke best. As expected, Jackie Come Home moved off and caused mayhem gifting the race to Tubbercurry Lad. Manorville Sand a natural stayer ran on for second place. Incidentally Moneypoint Coal trained by Seamus Graham scored a win in the consolation race in a very fast 28.84.

== See also ==
- 1985 UK & Ireland Greyhound Racing Year
