= 2003 Irish Greyhound Derby =

2003 Paddy Power Irish Greyhound Derby
- Venue: Shelbourne Park
- Location: Dublin
- Start date: 14 August
- End date: 20 September
- Total prize money: €150,000 (winner)

The 2003 Irish Greyhound Derby took place during August and September with the final being held at Shelbourne Park in Dublin on 20 September 2003.

The winner Climate Control won €150,000 and was trained by Seamus Graham, owned by Kevin Smith & Aidan O'Regan and bred by Ailish and Aisling McCann. The race was sponsored by the Paddy Power.

== Final result ==
At Shelbourne, 20 September (over 550 yards):

Position	Winner	Breeding	Trap	SP	Time	Trainer
1st	Climate Control	Larkhill Jo - Ballinclare Star	5	4-5f	29.71	Seamus Graham
2nd	Mustang Mega	Roanokee - Knockeevan Joy	4	7-2	29.85	Stephen Bourke
3rd	Maryville Rumble	Smooth Rumble - Budwiser Mary	6	8-1	29.88	Francie Murray
4th	La Fontaine	Split the Bill - Bunnys Joy	1	25-1	29.99	Andy Iaonnou
5th	First Charter	Jamella Prince - Newbridge Girl	3	50-1	30.00	Reggie Roberts
6th	Droopys Joel	Droopys Kewell - Droopys Choice	2	7-2	30.07	Fraser Black

=== Distances ===
1¾, neck, 1¼, short-head, ¾ (lengths)

== Competition Report ==
Climate Control led the ante-post betting for the 2002 Irish Derby. The blue dog had won the Consolation Stakes the previous year and had maintained good form since, even recovering from a hock injury at one stage. Serene Rumble was next in the ante-post list with World Class just behind.

Owen McKenna's Droopys Oasis was the first to impress in round one recording 29.74 and in round two Borna Pilot went even faster setting the best time so far (29.59). World Class was the first major name to eliminated before round three.

After the completion of round three there were six unbeaten greyhounds, they were Droopys Oasis, Droopys Agassi, Climate Control, Serene Rumble, Bookie Burglar and Maryville Rumble but Serene Rumble was withdrawn injured from the competition.

Only Droopys Agassi and Bookie Burglar remained unbeaten after the quarter-finals with the two remaining heats going to Kings Cadet and Mustang Mega. The first semifinal saw Kings Cadet break a hock when prominent and despite hampering Climate Control the latter won from the dead heating second place pair of First Charter and Maryville Rumble. Droopys Joel provided a shock result in the second heat after taking advantage of Droopys Agassi and Bookie Burglar bumping into each other, both were eliminated. Mustang Mega and La Fontaine sealed the final two places.

Climate Control took control of the final with a turn of early pace that saw him pull clear of the challenging First Charter and Mustang Mega. Climate Control won from Mustang Mega and the strong finishing Maryville Rumble talking third. The presentation was conducted by the Irish president Mary McAleese.

== Quarter-finals ==
Heat 1 (Sep 6)
Pos	Name	SP	Time
1st	Mustang Mega	5-4f	29.86
2nd	First Charter	5-1	30.28
3rd	La Fontaine	6-1	30.38
4th	Special Trick	6-1	30.45
5th	Top General	2-1	00.00
N/R	Serene Rumble		

Heat 2 (Sep 6)
Pos	Name	SP	Time
1st	Kings Cadet	3-1	29.71
2nd	Climate Control	9-10f	29.81
3rd	Priceless Rebel	20-1	29.95
4th	Droopys Oasis	3-1	30.13
5th	Sinabhfuilbertie	50-1	30.15
6th	Drumsna College	20-1	30.50

Heat 3 (Sep 6)
Pos	Name	SP	Time
1st	Droopys Agassi	5-2f	29.69
2nd	Droopys Joel	7-2	29.79
3rd	Maryville Rumble	3-1	29.85
4th	Kanoute	4-1	29.99
5th	Goldmember	8-1	30.09
6th	Jewel Nikita	6-1	30.16

Heat 4 (Sep 6)
Pos	Name	SP	Time
1st	Bookie Burglar	5-2	30.03
2nd	Borna Pilot	7-4f	
3rd	Chestnut Jet	8-1	
4th	Simply Vintage	20-1	
5th	Mobhi Gamble	3-1	
6th	Killaharra Dream	12-1	

== Semifinals ==
First Semifinal (Sep 13)
Pos	Name of Greyhound	SP	Time
1st	Droopys Joel	11-4	29.73
2nd	Mustang Mega	5-1	29.78
3rd	La Fontaine	66-1	29.92
4th	Bookie Burglar	10-1	29.94
5th	Priceless Rebel	20-1	30.12
6th	Droopys Agassi	4-5f	30.19

Second Semifinal (Sep 13)
Pos	Name of Greyhound	SP	Time
1st	Climate Control	5-4f	29.80
2nd	Maryville Rumble	8-1	30.01+
2nd	First Charter	66-1	30.01+
4th	Chestnut Jet	20-1	30.08
5th	Borna Pilot	5-2	30.18
6th	Kings Cadet	11-4	30.18

+dead-heat

== See also ==
- 2003 UK & Ireland Greyhound Racing Year
