= 1932 Irish Greyhound Derby =

- Location: Shelbourne Park
- End date: August 15
- Total prize money: £200 (winner)

The 1932 Irish Greyhound Derby took place during August with the final being held on 15 August 1932 at Shelbourne Park in Dublin.

In 1928 Harold's Cross introduced a competition called the National Derby that would become the modern day Irish Derby, the race was unofficial at this stage because Harold's Cross organised the National Derby without consulting with the Irish racing authorities.

In 1932 the Irish Coursing Club issued a new list of classic races to be run in 1932 and controversy followed because Harold's Cross had been given the Oaks and not the Derby. Shelbourne Park had been given the premier event despite the fact that Harold's Cross had effectively started the competition.

The winner Guideless Joe won £200 and was owned by leading jockey Jack Moylan and bred by Cornelius Forde.

== Final result ==
At Shelbourne Park (over 525 yards):

Position	Name of Greyhound	Breeding	Trap	SP	Time	Trainer
1st	Guideless Joe	Guiding Hand - Flaming Fire	5	7-4f	30.36	Mick Horan
2nd	Malhoe Man	Rattleaway - Feale Wave	1	3-1	30.39	
3rd	Silvery Sail	Mutton Cutlet - Moleskin Peggy	4	8-1	30.71	
4th	Master Chant	Four Aces - Out O'Tune	6	10-1		
unplaced	Castleve	Beaded Dick - Dainty Lassie	3	2-1		Arthur Doc Callanan
unplaced	The Singer	Mutton Cutlet - Winter Rosaleen	2	10-1		

=== Distances ===
Neck, 4 (lengths)

== Competition report ==
In the first semi final on 3 August Castleve defeated The Singer by 4 lengths in 30.51. The second on 6 August resulted in Malhoe Man beating Master Chant by a length and finally on 8 August Silvery Sail beat 1-3f Guideless Joe by a length. In the final Guideless Joe took a winning lead on the back straight holding off Malhoe Man by a neck.

== See also ==
1932 UK & Ireland Greyhound Racing Year
