= 1979 Irish Greyhound Derby =

- Venue: Shelbourne Park
- Location: Dublin
- End date: 28 July
- Total prize money: £20,000 (winner)

The 1979 Irish Greyhound Derby took place during June and July with the final being held at Shelbourne Park in Dublin on 28 July 1979.

The winner Penny County won £20,000 and was trained by Matt Travers, owned by Paddy Hurney & Sean Dunne and bred by Con Moore. The competition was sponsored by Carrolls.

== Final result ==
At Shelbourne, 28 July (over 525 yards):

| Position | Winner | Breeding | Trap | SP | Time | Trainer |
|---|---|---|---|---|---|---|
| 1st | Penny County | Dark Mercury - Columbcille Aim | 6 | 3-1 | 29.28 | Matt Travers |
| 2nd | Distant Clamour | Here Sonny - In Gear | 2 | 11-2 | 29.47 | Pat Jones |
| 3rd | Nameless Pixie | Monalee Champion - Itsastar | 5 | 7-2 | 29.52 | Ger McKenna |
| 4th | Airmount Champ | Hunday Champion - Winnies Call | 3 | 5-2f | 29.61 | Paddy Keane |
| 5th | Malange | Broadford Boy - Paper Cracker | 4 | 20-1 | 30.09 | Matt O'Donnell |
| 6th | Indian Joe | Brave Bran - Minnatonka | 1 | 5-1 | 30.10 | John Hayes |

=== Distances ===
2¼, ¾, 1¼, 6, short-head (lengths)

== Competition Report ==
The fastest time in the opening round of the Irish Derby was set by Up Nineteen in 29.06 secs, closely followed by Penny County in 29.12. Other winners included Knockrour Slave and Nameless Pixie.

In the second round Nameless Pixie was fastest in 29.25 with Distant Clamour just behind on 29.26, it was in this round that the well-respected Ger McKenna hound Knockrour Slave failed to progress to the next round. Indian Joe trained by John Hayes impressed in the quarter-finals winning in 29.22; the remaining quarter finals were claimed by Penny County, Airmount Champ and Rathvilly Night.

Distant Clamour won again in the semi-finals defeating 1978 finalist Malange; whilst Airmount Champ won the second heat beating Nameless Pixie. The third and final race saw Penny County qualify with Indian Joe in second place.

The final saw Penny County out of the traps first, chased by Distant Clamour who challenged on a couple of occasions but found his path blocked. Nameless Pixie ran on well for third place.

== See also ==
- 1979 UK & Ireland Greyhound Racing Year
