= 1969 UK & Ireland Greyhound Racing Year =

The 1969 UK & Ireland Greyhound Racing Year was the 44th year of greyhound racing in the United Kingdom and the 43rd year of greyhound racing in Ireland.

== Roll of honour ==
Major Winners
Award	Name of Winner
1969 English Greyhound Derby	Sand Star
1969 Irish Greyhound Derby	Own Pride
1969 Scottish Greyhound Derby	Not held
1969 Welsh Greyhound Derby	Pallas Joy
Greyhound Trainer of the Year	Phil Rees Sr.
Greyhound of the Year	Cals Pick
Irish Greyhound of the Year	Own Pride

== Summary ==
The Greyhound Racing Association (GRA) granted an option to Stock Conversion and Investment Ltd, for the purchase of greyhound racing's premier track White City Stadium for redevelopment. The official line was that a new modern White City stadium would be built in the remaining four acres from the existing 16 acres. However reporter Neil Martin stated "this move must spell death to all sport there in time – and in my opinion greyhound racing too". Fellow reporter John Bower had a different view, in that it would create a wonderful new stadium, a view seemingly given substance by the GRA, who announced that the architects plans were already drawn up. The GRA then announced that New Cross Stadium had been sold for development and it was closed in April. The GRA Property Trust was culling tracks at an alarming rate within the industry. They did however buy a large part of Wimbledon Stadium after a prolonged battle with developers attempting a takeover bid.

== Tracks ==
The list of greyhound tracks closing continued to grow. Park Royal Stadium, owned by London Stadiums Ltd, literally closed overnight on 22 January. Greenfield Stadium, Bradford closed, becoming the third site in three months to shut down; the final meeting was held on 5 March after being bought by Morrison's for redevelopment as industrial units. Aberdeen closed and was converted to a supermarket and warehouses. Former NGRC track Rochdale also closed. Corbiewood Stadium opened to greyhound racing.

Hackney Wick Stadium and Hendon Greyhound Stadium both received Bookmakers Afternoon Greyhound Service (BAGS) contracts replacing New Cross and Park Royal. New Cross trainers Charlie Smoothy and John Shevlin joined Clapton Stadium and West Ham Stadium respectively.

== Competitions ==
The 1,000 Guineas switched to Hendon Greyhound Stadium from the closed Park Royal Stadium. Tony's Friend lifted the Grand National at White City, in addition to the Scottish Grand National and set up a sequence of fourteen consecutive wins before being beaten. Tony's Friend continued his winning ways, lifting the Grand National of the West at Gloucester & Cheltenham Stadium but he was a little lucky because the leader fell at the first hurdle; that leader was a new hurdler called Sherrys Prince.

Yellow Printer continued to set special times and recorded 28.38 seconds when winning the Sir Billy Butlin Stakes at White City.

With little warning the Scottish Derby at Carntyne Stadium in Glasgow which was due to run on 30 August was cancelled, it would never be run at the track again.

== News ==
Pigalle Wonder died during the first days of January aged nearly thirteen. The National Greyhound Racing Club changed the rule whereby parties could be represented by legal counsel at steward's inquiries. The Greyhound Express was published for the last time on 8 November. The Sporting Life would take over the sponsorship of the Juvenile from the Express.

Wembley trainer Ronnie Melville retired, which led to Tom Johnston Jr. switching from West Ham and Jim Singleton taking Johnston's vacated post at West Ham. The sports current top trainer John Bassett left Clapton to take break from greyhound racing. H.R.H the Prince Edward, Duke of Kent became a greyhound owner after acquiring Peaceful Glen who was put with Joe Pickering at White City.

Portsmouth trainer Charlie Curtis, brother of George Curtis was killed in a car crash. The WGRF (World Greyhound Racing Federation) was formed.

== Ireland ==
The Irish Greyhound Board purchased Cork Greyhound Stadium for £127,500. Sand Star won the English Greyhound Derby but lost out to Own Pride for the Irish Greyhound of the Year, the latter had won the Irish Greyhound Derby. It was also the last Derby to be held at Harold's Cross Stadium.

== Principal UK races ==
Grand National, White City (April 19 525y h, £500)
Pos	Name of Greyhound	Trainer	SP	Time	Trap
1st	Tonys Friend	Randy Singleton	1-1f	30.16	1
2nd	Ballintore Tiger	Norman Chambers	9-2	30.26	6
3rd	Active Hit	Nora Gleeson	4-1	30.68	5
4th	Corral Prince	Nora Gleeson	20-1	30.72	2
5th	Colonels Rib	Joe Pickering	6-1	30.84	3
6th	Swift Miller		33-1	31.00	4

Gold Collar, Catford (May 10, 570y, £1,500)
Pos	Name of Greyhound	Trainer	SP	Time	Trap
1st	Surprising Fella	Jack Smith	2-1f	33.40	5
2nd	Ivy Hall Jewel	Natalie Savva	8-1	33.44	4
3rd	Cals Pick	Jack Harvey	3-1	33.47	1
4th	Pallas Joy	Adam Jackson	5-1	33.77	3
5th	Petrovitch	Jack Harvey	12-1	33.89	6
6th	Thurles Trader	Adam Jackson	3-1	34.05	2

The Grand Prix, Walthamstow (May 27, 600y, £500)
Pos	Name of Greyhound	Trainer	SP	Time	Trap
1st	Chame Sparrow	Barney O'Connor	6-1	40.75	3
2nd	Jack Stroller	Jimmy Jowett	7-1	40.91	1
3rd	Special Cognac	David Pett	4-1	40.94	6
4th	New Change	Dave Geggus	5-4f	41.02	4
5th	Mounteagle King	Charlie Curtis	6-1	41.26	2
6th	Drish Prairie		10-1	41.30	5

Welsh Derby, Arms Park (Jul 5, 525y £500)
Pos	Name of Greyhound	Trainer	SP	Time	Trap
1st	Pallas Joy	Adam Jackson	7-2	29.43	1
2nd	Cash For Dan	Ben Parsons	6-4f	29.67	2
3rd	Fly Half	Janet Tite	6-1	29.71	5
4th	Narod Star	Paddy Milligan	5-1	29.73	4
5th	Desert Kuda	Jim Irving	6-1	30.01	6
6th	Ashgrove Glen	Brian Jay	4-1	30.17	3

Oaks, Harringay (Jul 7, 525y, £1,000)
Pos	Name of Greyhound	Trainer	SP	Time	Trap
1st	Shady Bracelet	Peter Collett	7-4f	28.63	2
2nd	Bredas Feathers	K.Webb	8-1	28.67	6
3rd	That Cailin	Ray Wilkes	11-4	28.95	3
4th	Hiver Tatty	Jim Morgan	10-1	28.99	1
5th	Farma Sally	Phil Rees Sr.	5-2	29.05	5
6th	Kattys Prairie	Bette Godwin	50-1	29.53	4

Scurry Gold Cup, Clapton (Jul 12, 400y £1,000)
Pos	Name of Greyhound	Trainer	SP	Time	Trap
1st	Ace of Trumps	John Coleman	1-1f	22.85	2
2nd	Lovely Morning	Noreen Collin	10-1	23.11	1
3rd	Cheeky Boy	John Coleman	4-1	23.71	4
4th	Tarmons Buffalo		16-1	23.79	5
5th	Pears There	Dave Barker	10-3	23.85	6
6th	Trews		12-1	00.00	3

Laurels, Wimbledon (Aug 8, 500y, £1,500)
Pos	Name of Greyhound	Trainer	SP	Time	Trap
1st	Ardine Flame	Jack Kinsley	8-1	27.96	2
2nd	Beaverwood Wind	Stan Martin	6-4f	27.99	4
3rd	Munster Rabbit	Nora Gleeson	4-1	28.17	3
4th	Tullyallen	Clare Orton	4-1	28.19	1
5th	Bushane Queen	Mrs.B.Martin	14-1	28.23	5
6th	Pallas Joy	Adam Jackson	9-2	28.63	6

St Leger, Wembley (Aug 25, 700y, £1,500)
Pos	Name of Greyhound	Trainer	SP	Time	Trap
1st	Crefogue Dancer	Bob Burls	8-1	39.65	1
2nd	Booked Six	Alan Fearn	20-1	39.89	5
3rd	Greenane Gem	Bessie Lewis	4-9f	39.95	2
4th	Take off Outcast	Jimmy Jowett	16-1	39.97	4
5th	Jack Stroller	Jimmy Jowett	8-1	40.00	6
6th	Monalee Peter	Tom Johnston Jr.	7-1	40.02	3

Cesarewitch, West Ham (Oct 3, 600y, £1,500)
Pos	Name of Greyhound	Trainer	SP	Time	Trap
1st	Cals Pick	Jack Harvey	6-4jf	32.98	2
2nd	Mad Ville	Bob Burls	25-1	33.12	6
3rd	Greenane Gem	Bessie Lewis	6-4jf	33.15	4
4th	Marton Tim	Tom Baldwin	9-2	33.39	5
5th	Handsome Sun	Jimmy Jowett	9-2	33.55	1
6th	Burnpark Bill		100-1	33.67	3

BBC TV Trophy, White City (Oct 16, 880y, £1,000)
Pos	Name of Greyhound	Trainer	SP	Time	Trap
1st	Cash For Dan	Ben Parsons	5-4f	49.44+	1
2nd	Jack Stroller	Jimmy Jowett	3-1	49.86	3
3rd	Pleasant Fly	J Cook	10-1	50.38	2
4th	Sovereign Ore	John Perrin	10-1	50.94	6
5th	Nualas Image		33-1	50.95	4
6th	Greenane Gem	Bessie Lewis	3-1	51.19	5

+Track record

== Principal Irish races ==
Easter Cup, Shelbourne Park (April £500)
Pos	Name of Greyhound	Trainer	SP	Time	Trap
1st	Move Gas	Ger McKenna		30.29	2
2nd	Clover Kid			30.37	6
3rd	Durhava Pride			30.65	
u	Stylish Shane				1

Produce Stakes, Clonmel (May 8, 525y £1,250)
Pos	Name of Greyhound	Trainer	SP	Time	Trap
1st	Right O'Myross	Dave Cashman	2-1	29.90	1
2nd	Santanita			30.06	5
3rd	Bright Lad		6-4f	30.07	3
4th	Westpark Toots				2
5th	Westpark Barney				4
6th	Dutch Navy				6

u=unplaced

== Totalisator returns ==
Extended content

The totalisator returns declared to the licensing authorities for the year 1969 are listed below.

Stadium	Turnover £
London (White City)	6,262,275
London (Harringay)	3,791,781
London (Wimbledon)	3,753,989
London (Walthamstow)	3,614,786
Manchester Belle Vue & White City (combined)	3,567,438
London (Wembley)	2,898,167
London (Catford)	2,410,758
London (Clapton)	2,086,386
London (West Ham)	1,783,769
Romford	1,565,343
Edinburgh (Powderhall)	1,459,866
London (Charlton)	1,305,612
Birmingham (Perry Barr, old)	1,281,355
Birmingham (Hall Green)	1,201,411
Brighton & Hove	1,192,961
Newcastle (Brough Park)	1,026,060
Crayford & Bexleyheath	1,012,336

Stadium	Turnover £
Glasgow (Shawfield)	951,943
Slough	923,081
Leeds (Elland Road)	896,288
Wolverhampton (Monmore)	863,174
London (Hackney)	817,962
London (Hendon)	788,350
Bristol (Eastville)	777,245
Sheffield (Owlerton)	766,191
Manchester (Salford)	743,039
Glasgow (White City)	731,118
Newcastle (Gosforth)	722,407
Southend-on-Sea	714,966
Willenhall	680,384
Gloucester & Cheltenham	625,050
Birmingham (Kings Heath)	614,372
Cardiff (Arms Park)	584,626
Liverpool (White City)	562,582
Poole	537,658

Stadium	Turnover £
Derby	515,838
Reading (Oxford Road)	505,508
Ramsgate (Dumpton Park)	498,214
Cradley Heath	475,464
Rochester & Chatham	462,710
Oxford	438,583
Portsmouth	378,884
Glasgow (Carntyne)	373,656
Leicester (Blackbird Rd)	331,752
Middlesbrough	329,729
Rayleigh (Essex)	302,316
Nottingham (White City)	293,816
Hull (Old Craven Park)	284,061
Preston	263,299
Norwich (City)	216,637
Swindon	214,433
Wakefield	206,070
