= 1952 Irish Greyhound Derby =

- Venue: Shelbourne Park
- Location: Dublin
- End date: 9 August
- Total prize money: £1,000 (winner)

The 1952 Irish Greyhound Derby took place during July and August with the final being held at Shelbourne Park in Dublin on 9 August 1952.

The winner Rough Waters was trained by Henry Lalor, owned Jimmy Lalor and bred by John Byrne. He was bought for 170 guineas by leading Irish bookmaker Jimmy Lalor for his wife Patricia at the Shelbourne Park sales in April 1951. Rough Waters had spent 1951 'flapping' (racing on the independent tracks) in Scotland before being aimed at the Irish Derby.

== Final result ==
At Shelbourne, 9 August (over 525 yards):

Position	Name of Greyhound	Breeding	Trap	SP	Time	Trainer
1st	Rough Waters	D X Rice - Just Push	2	5-2	29.95	Henry Lalor
2nd	Dismal	Shaggy Lad - Take Murex			29.98	Tom Lynch
3rd	Kilcurry Ranger	unknown		2-1f	30.06	Jack McAllister
unplaced	Titterington	unknown	1	3-1		
unplaced	Call Dan	unknown				
unplaced	Odile's Latch	Glenview Shaggy – Odilles Fancy		10-1		

=== Distances ===
neck, 1 (lengths)

== Competition Report ==
After winning two successive heats Rough Waters won the first semi-final from Titterington by one length in a time of 29.96. In the second semi-final Kilcurry Ranger defeated Call Dan by four lengths before Dismal beat Odile's Latch by four lengths in 30.07 to complete the semi-finals

On 9 August it rained all day and before the final got underway there was a major gamble on Titterington from 8–1 to 3–1. As the traps opened Rough Waters was first out from trap 2 but was challenged by Call Dan around the second bend before drawing clear. Call Dan faded as Dismal and Kilcurry Ranger ran on to finish second and third respectively.

== See also ==
1952 UK & Ireland Greyhound Racing Year
