= 1976 Irish Greyhound Derby =

- Venue: Shelbourne Park
- Location: Dublin
- End date: 24 July
- Total prize money: £15,500 (winner)

The 1976 Irish Greyhound Derby took place during June and July with the final being held at Shelbourne Park in Dublin on 24 July 1975.

The winner Tain Mor won £15,500 and was trained and bred by Paddy & Jack Nolan and owned by Miss Aifric Campbell. The competition was sponsored by Carrolls and the winners prize increased to £15,500.

== Final result ==
At Shelbourne, 24 July (over 525 yards):

Position	Winner	Breeding	Trap	SP	Time	Trainer
1st	Tain Mor	Monalee Champion – An Tain	4	7-4jf	29.35	Paddy & Jack Nolan
2nd	Carn Top	Itsachampion – Kilhoyle Darkie	6	12–1	29.54	R Kelly
3rd	Antone Wonder	Quiet Spring – Mountprim Ka	3	33–1	29.56	Noel Ryan
4th	Bins Bridge	Pepes Dilemma – West Link Lady	1	4–1		Dermot O'Rourke
5th	Strike At Dawn	Bold Invader – Famous Dawn	2	16–1		P Dickson
6th	Ashmore Merry	Newdown Heather – Merry Fi	5	7-4jf		Mary McGrath

=== Distances ===
2¼, head (lengths)

== Competition Report ==
The event was now worth £15,500 to the winner and top entries for the 1976 running were the Ger McKenna pair of Ballybeg Prim and Shamrock Point. Ballybeg Prim had performed well in the 1976 English Greyhound Derby and Shamrock Point had once again won the English Derby consolation.

The competition started badly for Ballybeg Prim who was knocked out, he had lost considerable weight travelling back to Ireland which consequently made him run a poor race. Cindy's Speck also crashed out but Shamrock Point qualified but failed to win his heat beaten by Tory Snowball. The highlight of the round was the English challenger Flip Your Top who won in 29.30. Tain Mor, the recent Cambridgeshire winner over 600 yards, ran well over the shorter distance to claim a heat win.

Tain Mor then produced a very fast 29.04 in the second round, a run that impressed and Tory Snowball won again in a fast 29.18. Shamrock Point disappointed and made it no further after being eliminated. The quarter finals provided further shocks as Tory Snowball and Win Sam both failed to progress any further with the four races being won by Silly Socket, Stylish Cutlet, Bins Bridge and Ashmore Merry.

The semi-finals arrived and resulted in one of the most sensational nights in Shelbourne Park history. Tain Mor won in a very fast time of 28.95, Strike At Dawn and Carn Top did well to qualify for the final behind him. Then in the second semi-final Ashmore Merry drew clear of the field and came home in a new track record of 28.74. Suddenly from a competition that was in need of a boost there were two stars ready to compete in the final. The two drew poor trap draws in the final with trap 4 and 5 respectively, but both were still heavily backed into 7-4 joint favourites.

In an exciting final the heavily gambled Bins Bridge lost his early lead to Antone Wonder down the back straight, by the third bend Tain Mor who had found a little trouble got into his stride and passed the pair moving clear to win. Carn Top finished well to grab the runner-up spot but Ashmore Merry ran poorly. The connections of Ashmore Merry witnessed one of their other greyhounds Tantallons Gift break the one-week-old track record in a supporting race after recording 28.73.

== See also ==
- 1976 UK & Ireland Greyhound Racing Year
