= 1961 Irish Greyhound Derby =

- Venue: Harold's Cross Stadium
- Location: Dublin
- End date: 11 August
- Total prize money: £1,250 (winner)

The 1961 Irish Greyhound Derby took place during July and August with the final being held at Harold's Cross Stadium in Dublin on 11 August 1961.

The winner Chieftain's Guest won £1,250 and was trained and bred by Leslie McNair, and jointly owned by McNair and Eric McCullough.

== Final result ==
At Harold's Cross, 11 August (over 525 yards):

Position	Name of Greyhound	Breeding	Trap	SP	Time	Trainer
1st	Chieftain's Guest	Knock Hill Chieftain - Star Guest	1	5-2	29.45	Leslie McNair
2nd	Skips Choice	Romola's Dante - Phil Skip	6	5-1	29.49	Gay McKenna
3rd	The Grand Canal	Champion Prince - The Grand Duchess	4	4-1	29.57	Paddy Dunphy
4th	Wild Maid	Champion Prince - Much Loved	3	6-4f		
5th	Ballycashen Rory	unknown	2	20-1		
6th	Evening Iris	unknown	5	100-7		

=== Distances ===
½, 1 (lengths)

== Competition Report ==
Long Story and Sandown Dick were major eliminations during the first round and Clonmel record holder Odd Venture broke a hock whilst leading. First round winners included The Grand Canal, Ireland's leading bitch Wild Maid, Evening Irish and Ballycashen Rory.

In the second round The Grand Canal won again with Spark of Delight and Wild Maid also impressing. The first semi-final went to Wild Maid in 29.32 and The Grand Canal who remained unbeaten after recording 29.36 in the second semi-final. The final semi was won by Skips Choice in a slower time of 29.84.

The final saw three greyhounds prominent early, Skips Choice had etched out a lead but the strong finishing Chieftains Guest caught him and won by half a length to land a hefty gamble with The Grand Canal also running on strongly a further length behind. Chieftains Guest who had failed to win a race leading up to the final was to finish lame on his wrist.

== See also ==
- 1961 UK & Ireland Greyhound Racing Year
