= 1941 Irish Greyhound Derby =

- Venue: Shelbourne Park
- Location: Dublin
- End date: 4 October

The 1941 Irish Greyhound Derby took place during September and October with the final being held at Shelbourne Park in Dublin on 4 October.

Foot-and-mouth disease caused serious problems during 1941 with traveling almost ceased and Irish tracks coming to a standstill in many areas. The travel ban was lifted at the end of the summer, and late plans were made to salvage the Irish Derby before the year concluded. As a result, the final was rescheduled to a much later date in October at Shelbourne Park, as Cork had withdrawn from hosting the race. The winner Brave Damsel was owned by John Byrne who was known for owning the famous bitch Queen of the Suir before she left for the England.

== Final result ==
At Shelbourne Park, 4 October (over 525 yards):

Position	Name of Greyhound	Breeding	Trap	SP	Time	Trainer
1st	Brave Damsel	Maidens Boy - Queen of the Suir	2	4-1	30.64	Paddy Kelly (Celbridge)
2nd	Shes Tidy	All Together - Share Call	5	3-1	30.72	Sheehy
3rd	Gaelic Inler	breeding unknown	4	5-2	30.78	
4th	Pretty Forethought	Royal Tom - Pretty Bird	1	6-1		Larkin (Cork)
5th	Heatherset Hero	With Luck - Moving Ripple	5	7-4f		Morris
N/R	Brilliant Teddy	Brilliant Bob - Civil	6			Billy Quinn

=== Distances ===
1, ¾ (lengths)

== Competition Report ==
Surly became a leading fancy after round two when beating Heatherset Hero by three lengths in 30.08. The other three second round heats went to Roeside Ilene, Well Protected and Gaelic Inler. Gaelic Inler then provided a 10-1 shock semi-final win over Shes Tidy and Brave Damsel to remain unbeaten. Brilliant Teddy earned victory in the second semi-final from Heatherset Hero and Pretty Forethought. Both hot favourites Surly and Roeside Ilene were eliminated.

In the final Brilliant Teddy trained by Billy Quinn was drawn well in trap six but was forced to pull out. The remaining five runners lined up and Brave Damsel was gambled from 7-1 to 4-1. he won the race leading all the way from the chasing Shes Tidy and Gaelic Inler. Pretty Forethought a finalist form two years previous finished fourth and the favourite Heatherset Hero trailed in last.

== See also ==
- 1941 UK & Ireland Greyhound Racing Year
