= 1951 Irish Greyhound Derby =

- Venue: Harold's Cross Stadium
- Location: Dublin
- End date: 17 August
- Total prize money: £500 (winner)

The 1951 Irish Greyhound Derby took place during July and August with the final being held at Harold's Cross Stadium in Dublin on 17 August 1951.

The winner Carmodys Tanist won a reduced prize of £500 and was trained by Dicky Myles and owned by Frances Chandler.

== Final result ==
At Harold's Cross, 17 August (over 525 yards):

Position	Name of Greyhound	Breeding	Trap	SP	Time	Trainer	Notes
1st	Carmodys Tanist	Mad Tanist - Castletown Skinner	3	4-1	29.64	Dicky Myles	Track record
2nd	Locht Seal	Ballyhennessy Seal - Linda	6	fav	29.72	Tom Lynch	
3rd	Miss Genei	Bella's Prince - Captured Confey	1	4-1	30.20	Henry Lalor	
4th	Noble Greason	unknown	5			Tom Lynch	
5th	Daring Prince	unknown	4			Mary D'Arcy	
6th	Dooneen Miss	Mad Tanist - Imperial Girl	2	10-1		Tom Lynch	

=== Distances ===
1, 6 (lengths)

== Competition Report ==
A disappointing fact regarding the 1951 Derby was the reduction in prize money for the winner from £1,000 to just £500. The leading greyhound in Ireland at the time Champion Prince owned by Dan Maher was a notable absentee when the first round began. Trainer Tom Lynch steered three hounds through to the final; he had previously trained a runner-up in Down Signal and had been devastated at Imperial Dancer's exit the previous year. Lynch would later marry the sister of Gay McKenna.

The first semi-final was won by Locht Seal from Miss Gemnei and Carmodys Tanist in 29.85, despite the fact that Sterope had led by three lengths in the home straight before suffering cramp and finishing last. The second semi-final saw Daring Prince beat Noble Greason and Dooneen Miss in 29.84. In the final Carmodys Tanist led all the way holding off Locht Seal, the other four runners found trouble at the first bend and were never in contention.

Carmodys Tanist, a black dog, had been knocked out of the English Greyhound Derby in the second round when trained by Noreen Collin. His owner Mrs Frances Chandler then sent the greyhound to Dublin trainer Dickie Myles for the Irish Derby. At the presentation Frances was in Italy so her brother in law Ronnie Chandler accepted the trophy, Ronnie was the only member of the famous Chandler family to train greyhounds.

== See also ==
- 1951 UK & Ireland Greyhound Racing Year
