= 1929 Irish Greyhound Derby =

1929 National Derby
- Venue: Harold's Cross Stadium
- Location: Dublin
- End date: 22 August

The 1929 National Derby took place during August with the final being held at Harold's Cross Stadium in Dublin on 22 August 1929. It was the second edition of the event. The race at this stage was considered unofficial because it had not been ratified by the Irish Coursing Club.

The winner was Jack Bob, trained by Yeats, owned by Miss P Harris and bred by Mick Lynch.

== Final result ==
At Harolds Cross, 22 August (over 525 yards):

Position	Winner	Breeding	Trap	SP	Time	Trainer
1st	Jack Bob	Orkit - Tottie Longsocks	1	1-2f	30.30	H Yeats
2nd	Into Battle	Chevalier - Delightful Lass	4	14-1	30.74	
unplaced	Black Scab	Speedy Kaiser - Julia	3	14-1		
unplaced	Swift Service	unknown	2	3-1		
unplaced	Organ Grinder	unknown	5	8-1		

=== Distances ===
3 (lengths)

== See also ==
1929 UK & Ireland Greyhound Racing Year
