= 1981 Irish Greyhound Derby =

- Venue: Shelbourne Park
- Location: Dublin
- End date: 25 July
- Total prize money: £25,000 (winner)

The 1981 Irish Greyhound Derby took place during June and July with the final being held at Shelbourne Park in Dublin on 25 July 1981.

The winner Bold Work won £25,000 and was trained by Frank O'Regan, owned by Breda O'Regan and bred by Michael Foley. The competition was sponsored by Carrolls.

== Final result ==
At Shelbourne, 25 July (over 525 yards):

Position	Winner	Breeding	Trap	SP	Time	Trainer
1st	Bold Work	Itsachampion – Silver Moll	3	6/1	29.32	Frank O'Regan
2nd	Calandra Champ	Itsachampion – Calendar Girl	2	4/6f	29.36	Francie Murray
3rd	Moreen Rocket	Moreen Hyena – Bog Match	1	6/1	29.37	Jim Conaty
4th	Brickyard Gem	Glen Rock – Grange Hostess	5	6/1	29.39	Francie Murray
5th	Murlens Blond	Liberty Lad – Lemon Cider	4	10/1		Christy O'Rourke
6th	Robbie Lad	Some Skinomage – Another Flame	6	16/1		John Franklin

=== Distances ===
½, short-head, head (lengths)

== Semi finals ==
First semi final (Jul 18)
Pos	Name of Greyhound	Time
1st	Calandra Champ	29.32
2nd	Robbie Lad	29.74
3rd	Sinbad	29.75
u	Millbowe Sam	

Second semi final (Jul 18)
Pos	Name of Greyhound	Time
1st	Moreen Rocket	29.44
2nd	Bold Work	29.51
3rd	Cooladine Super	29.68

Third semi final (Jul 18)
Pos	Name of Greyhound	Time
1st	Murlens Blond	29.36
2nd	Brickyard Gem	29.41
u	Upland Tiger 7-4f	
u	Gos Beag	

== Competition Report ==
A historic 50th Irish Greyhound Derby event attracted 118 runners. The Irish challenge was headed by Produce Stakes winner Calandra Champ trained by Francie Murray and owned by Eddie Costello. The main English challenge was Upland Tiger trained by George Curtis and both hounds showed their class winning in fast times on opening night of 29.09 and 29.08 respectively.

The second round produced some controversy when Bonifacio won in 31.55, the bookmakers felt the stewards should have declared a no race because of the time and stood down for the next race. Two runners Kool Dude and Millbowe Sam broke 29 seconds winning in 28.88 and 28.96. The third round saw Cooladine Super go best in 29.06 with Upland Tiger and Calandra Champ winning once again. Bold Work was next to show his hand winning his quarter-final in 29.10 with further wins for Cooladine Super, Calandra Champ and Oran Jack.

Calandra Champ continued a faultless run to the final beating Robbie Lad by six lengths in the first semi, Moreen Rocket defeated Bold Work in the second heat and Murlens Blond and Brickyard Gem qualified from the final heat with Upland Tiger being eliminated.

In the final Calandra Champ made a poor start and after trouble at the first his challenge had ended. Bold Work led early pursued by Brickyard Gem and Robbie Lad. Bold Work held on well and came home first holding off a late challenge by Calandra Champ who had run a remarkable race to gain considerable ground.

== See also ==
- 1981 UK & Ireland Greyhound Racing Year
