= 1943 Irish Greyhound Derby =

- Venue: Harold's Cross Stadium
- Location: Dublin
- End date: August 6

The 1943 Irish Greyhound Derby took place during July and August with the final being held at Harold's Cross Stadium in Dublin on 6 August.

The winner Famous Knight was owned by Miss R Monaghan and trained by Bertie Tierney.

== Final result ==
At Harolds Cross, 6 August (over 525 yards):

Position	Name of Greyhound	Breeding	Trap	SP	Time	Trainer
1st	Famous Knight	Highland Rum - Flyers Fortune	2	5-4f	30.26	Bertie Tierney
2nd	Discretion	Creamery Border - Noreside Ruby	4	6-1	30.42	Willie Rowan
3rd	Double Rum	breeding unknown	5	10-1	30.50	Arthur Doc Callanan
4th	Down the Dee	breeding unknown	1	5-1		Joe Davis
5th	Kusta Bok	Valiant Cutlet - Karra Katta	3	5-2		Arthur Doc Callanan
6th	Brilliant Smile	Manhattan Midnight - Civil	6	10-1		Kavanagh

=== Distances ===
2, 1 (lengths)

== Competition Report ==
Famous Knight a red fawn dog started as ante-post favourite and in the first round won in 30.29, the time was bettered by Blackrock Border who recorded a 30.12 win. The fastest second round wins were Kusta Bok (30.25) and Race Day (30.40) but Famous Knight won again in 30.49.

In the semi-finals on 30 July Famous Knight defeated Double Rum by one length in 30.30, followed by a 30.45 win for Discretion from Kusta Bok in a heat that saw Blackrock Border eliminated. The third semi was taken by Down the Dee from Brilliant Smile in a slow 30.98.

In the final Kusta Bok broke well and led until the third bend before the expected move from Famous Knight took place. The latter went on to win by two lengths from a strong finishing Discretion.

== See also ==
- 1943 UK & Ireland Greyhound Racing Year
