= 1956 Irish Greyhound Derby =

Birish greyhound racing event

- Venue: Shelbourne Park
- Location: Dublin
- End date: 11 August
- Total prize money: £500 (winner)

The 1956 Irish Greyhound Derby took place during July and August with the final being held at Shelbourne Park in Dublin on 11 August 1956.

The winner Keep Moving won £500 and was trained by Tommy Ferguson and owned by Mrs Kathleen McBride.

== Final result ==
At Shelbourne, 11 August (over 525 yards):

Position	Name of Greyhound	Breeding	Trap	SP	Time	Trainer
1st	Keep Moving	Imperial Dancer – California	1	9/4	29.18	Tommy Ferguson
2nd	Prince of Bermuda	Champion Prince – Sunora	6	4/9f	29.38	Ger McKenna
3rd	Baytown Dell	Ollys Pal – Baytown Brunette	4	10/1	29.62	Paddy Barry
4th	The Glider	Jeffs Pal – Lamour	5	25/1	30.09	Bernard Maren
5th	Mr Taptoes	unknown	3	50/1		
6th	Easter Orals	unknown	2	N/R		

=== Distances ===
2½, 3, 6 (lengths)

== Competition Report ==
The 1956 Derby resulted in an exciting competition despite the fact that Spanish Battleship was now retired. A greyhound called Keep Moving broke the track record at Shelbourne, recording 29.49 before the event got underway. He had been bought for 700 guineas by Mrs McBride at the Shelbourne sales.

On 21 July Keep Moving bettered his own record by recording 29.40 in the first round. Then in heat three of the first round, a brindle dog called Prince of Bermuda was fast away and gained an easy victory; when the time was announced as 28.98 the Irish greyhound world was left stunned. The 29 second barrier had been broken for the first time.

Both of the greyhounds won their second round heats with Prince of Bermuda posting 29.20. In the semi-finals the pair met in the same heat with Prince of Bermuda defeating his main rival by three lengths in 29.35. The second semi-final ended with a win for Baytown Dell; The Glider and Easter Orals claimed the remaining qualification berths.

In an eagerly awaited final Keep Moving broke first with Prince of Bermuda attempting but failing to pass at the first bend. Keep Moving ran a superb race in 29.10 to hold off Prince of Bermuda for victory by two and a half lengths.

== See also ==
- 1956 UK & Ireland Greyhound Racing Year
