= 1934 Irish Greyhound Derby =

Irish greyhound race

- Location: Harold's Cross Stadium

The 1934 Irish Greyhound Derby known as the National Derby at the time took place during August and September with the final being held at Harold's Cross Stadium in Dublin.

The 1934 Irish Derby was finally awarded to Harold's Cross on condition that they contributed a minimum of £100 towards the event. The ICC added a further £50. It was also agreed that Shelbourne Park and Harold's Cross would run the competition in alternate years.

The winner Frisco Hobo was owned by Tim Fennin.

== Final result ==
At Harolds Cross (over 525 yards):

Position	Name of Greyhound	Breeding	Trap	SP	Time	Trainer
1st	Frisco Hobo	Hidden Badger - Pykes Peak		12-1	30.45	Tom Harty
2nd	Buzzing Dick	Leningrad - Beaten Rattle		1-1f	30.53	Joe McKenna
3rd	April Sandy				30.77	
4th	Seldom at Home				30.78	Joe McKenna
unplaced	My Mistake	Open Streak – Misconduct				
unplaced	Kerryhill Boy					

=== Distances ===
1, 3, short-head

=== Competition Report ===
There were nine first round heats with the first two from each qualifying for the semi-finals. Kerryhill Boy won the first semi by six lengths from My Mistake in a time of 30.32 sec. Buzzing Dick won the second by half a length from April Dandy in 30.28 and the final semi went to Seldom at Home four lengths ahead of Frisco Hobo in 30.75. In the final the outsider Frisco Hobo took the lead at the second bend and held of a late challenge by Buzzing Dick.

== See also ==
- 1934 UK & Ireland Greyhound Racing Year
