= 1930 Irish Greyhound Derby =

1930 National Derby
- Venue: Harold's Cross Stadium
- Location: Dublin
- End date: 5 September

The 1930 National Derby took place during August and September with the final being held at Harold's Cross Stadium in Dublin on 5 September 1930. It was the third edition of the event. The race at this stage was considered unofficial because it had not been ratified by the Irish Coursing Club.

The winner was Prince Fern, trained by J Harper.

== Final result ==
At Harolds Cross, 5 September (over 525 yards):

Position	Winner	Breeding	Trap	SP	Time	Trainer
1st	Prince Fern	Green Fern - Run Around	2	4-1	30.13	James Harper
2nd	Odd Minister	Cheerful Charger - Carline	5	7-4jf	30.19	M Mullane
unplaced	Whatever	What's Next - Ballymore	3	7-4jf		M Mullally
unplaced	Special Law	Lax Law - Handsome Hilda	4	5-1		J Stack
unplaced	Hydrangea	Cheerful Speed - Maire Cailin	1	4-1		John Harney
unplaced	Black Raymond	Ballymorriss - Miss Reble	6	14-1		Gallivan/MccCormack

=== Distances ===
¾ (lengths)

== See also ==
1930 UK & Ireland Greyhound Racing Year
