= 2002 Irish Greyhound Derby =

2002 Paddy Power Irish Greyhound Derby
- Venue: Shelbourne Park
- Location: Dublin
- Start date: 15 August
- End date: 14 September
- Total prize money: €150,000 (winner)

The 2002 Irish Greyhound Derby took place during August and September with the final being held at Shelbourne Park in Dublin on 14 September 2002.

The winner Bypass Byway won €150,000 and was trained by Ollie Bray, owned by Michael Kearney and bred by Pat D'Arcy. The race was sponsored by the Paddy Power.

== Final result ==
At Shelbourne, 14 September (over 550 yards):

Position	Winner	Breeding	Trap	SP	Time	Trainer	Notes
1st	Bypass Byway	Spiral Nikita -Sandy Penny	5	11-8f	29.42	Sean Bourke	Track record
2nd	Droopys Rhys	Jamaican Hero - High Knight	4	2-1	29.84	Reggie Roberts	
3rd	Heavenly Hero	Always Good - Mams Choice	3	16-1	29.98	John Donohoe	
4th	Tyrur Bello	Spiral Nikita - Locnamon Lady	2	20-1	30.08	Paul Hennessy	
5th	Tamna Rose	Come On Ranger - Quare Season	1	12-1	30.15	Paul Hennessy	
6th	Droopys Agassi	Top Honcho - Droopys Cheryl	6	9-2	30.17	Owen McKenna	

=== Distances ===
5¼, 1¾, 1¼, 1, head (lengths)

== Competition Report ==
The Irish public's favourite greyhound Late Late Show returned for another attempt at the 2002 Irish Derby but the leading ante-post greyhounds were Scottish Greyhound Derby champion Priceless Rebel and Droopys Rhys now under the care of Reggie Roberts instead of former trainer Ted Soppitt.

The first round ended with Bypass Byway setting the fastest time of 29.74 for trainer Ollie Bray and defeating Priceless Rebel. Vigorous Rex performed well in 29.76 but Late Late Show only managed a second place before being diagnosed with an injury and being withdrawn from the competition. Bypass Byway was the new favourite and he won again in 29.87 with Priceless Rebel eliminated in the same heat. Droopys Rhys dipped under 30 seconds recording 29.99 and then in the quarter-finals he recorded 29.77 success. The other heat winners were Tamna Rose, Borna Pilot and Droopys Agassi, the latter beat Bypass Byway who was lucky to still be in the competition following a stumble in the heat.

The first semifinal saw Bypass Byway hold off Droopys Rhys by half a length in a fast 29.68 with Heavenly Hero claiming the third place. In the other semi Droopys Agassi won from Tamna Rose and Tyrur Bello.

In the final Bypass Byway and Droopys Rhys vied for the lead with Droopys Agassi prominent. Bypass Byway kicked and drew clear of his main rival crossing the line in 29.42 which represented a new track record by no less than 15 spots (0.15sec). Heavenly Hero ran on well for third behind Droopys Rhys and Droopys Agassi faded into last place.

== Quarter-finals ==
Heat 1 (Aug 31)
Pos	Name	SP	Time
1st	Droopys Rhys	6-4f	29.77
2nd	Serene Rumble	4-1	30.15
3rd	Jet Spray	7-2	30.36
4th	Mearnog Celt	6-1	30.37
5th	Ace Honcho	7-1	30.48
6th	Easy Street	14-1	30.50

Heat 2 (Aug 31)
Pos	Name	SP	Time
1st	Droopys Agassi	3-1	30.02
2nd	Lughill Lord	5-1	30.23
3rd	Bypass Byway	6-4f	30.33
4th	Larkhill River	6-1	30.54
5th	Walking Sunday	7-1	30.56
6th	Business Success	12-1	31.19

Heat 3 (Aug 31)
Pos	Name	SP	Time
1st	Tamna Rose	8-1	30.05
2nd	Olden Times	5-2	30.10
3rd	Heavenly Hero	2-1f	30.11
4th	Climate Control	5-2	30.25
5th	Govenor	50-1	30.29
6th	Charlie Bird	12-1	30.32

Heat 4 (Aug 31)
Pos	Name	SP	Time
1st	Borna Pilot	3-1	30.17
2nd	Tyrur Bello	5-1	30.19
3rd	Droopys Gloria	8-1	30.29
4th	Magical Captain	6-1	30.68
5th	Rebel Watcher	2-1f	30.89
6th	Cool Gamble	5-1	31.45

== Semifinals ==
First Semifinal (Sep 7)
Pos	Name of Greyhound	SP	Time
1st	Droopys Agassi	4-6f	29.87
2nd	Tamna Rose	6-1	30.29
3rd	Tyrur Bello	13-2	30.32
4th	Serene Rumble	11-2	30.60
5th	Jet Spray	12-1	30.64
6th	Lughill Lord	14-1	30.78

Second Semifinal (Sep 7)
Pos	Name of Greyhound	SP	Time
1st	Bypass Byway	5-4f	29.68
2nd	Droopys Rhys	9-4	29.71
3rd	Heavenly Hero	9-1	29.92
4th	Olden Times	9-1	30.38
5th	Borna Pilot	5-1	30.40
6th	Droopys Gloria	5-1	30.50

== See also ==
- 2002 UK & Ireland Greyhound Racing Year
