= Irish Sprint Cup =

Irish greyhound racing competition

- Class: Feature
- Location: Dundalk Stadium
- Inaugurated: 1932
- Sponsor: Bar One Racing Ltd

Race information
- Distance: 400 yards
- Surface: Sand
- Purse: €20,000 (winner)

The Irish Sprint Cup, formerly known as the Irish National Cup and Irish National Sprint, is a greyhound racing competition held annually at Dundalk Stadium in Dundalk, County Louth, Ireland. It is a prestigious invitation event held for Ireland's leading sprinters and is an integral part of the Irish greyhound racing calendar.

== History ==
It was first held at the Dunmore Park Greyhound Stadium in 1932 and again from 1938 until 2000 until the track closed in 1996 and then it returned in 1999 at Ballyskeagh before switching to Dundalk in 2004. The event was sponsored by Guinness from 1965 until 1996.

== Venues and distances ==
- 1932–1940 (Dunmore Park, 435 yards)
- 1942–1942 (Celtic Park, 375 yards)
- 1943–1996 (Dunmore Park, 435 yards)
- 1999–2002 (Ballyskeagh/Drumbo Park, 325 yards)
- 2004–2004 (Dundalk, 410 yards)
- 2005–present (Dundalk, 400 yards)

== Sponsors ==
- 1965–1996 (Guinness)
- 2004–2025 (Bar One Racing Ltd)

== Winners ==
Year	Winner	Breeding	Time	Trainer	SP	Notes/refs
1932	Guideless Joe	Guiding Hand – Flaming Fire	24.11	Mick Horan	1/3f	
1938	British Destiny	Fulford – Miss Orville	24.99	Billie Dunlop	13/8	
1939	Lone Kil	Lone Man – Lucky Plum	24.69	Mrs W. McL. Wallace	7/1	
1940	Farloe Border	Valiant Cutlet – Roeside Cook	24.03	D. McCann	10/11f	
1941	not held due to Foot-and-mouth disease					
1942	Fair Mistress	Saccadee – Edith Bronte	20.54	Frank Moore	1/3f	
1943	Fair Mistress	Saccadee – Edith Bronte	24.03	Frank Moore	4/7f	Track record
1944	Mad Tanist	Tanist – Mad Darkie	24.11	Jack McAllister	no SP	Track record
1945	Oranmore Bandit	Rebel Light – Duffy's Tea Again	24.08	M. Twibill	4/7f	
1946	Count Lally	Inler Irish – Lady of the Gale	24.56	Jack McAllister	4/5f	
1947	Fair Moving	Well Squared – Fair Light	24.32	J. McMullan	7/4	dead-heat
1947	Rockfield Light	Well Squared – Fair Light	24.32	W. P. O'Kane	10/1	dead-heat
1948	Leamas Sport	Sporting Tanist – Misers Curse	24.66	W. P. O'Kane	3/1	
1949	Burndennet Brook	Great Climber – Cherokee Girl	23.99	H. Gallagher	4/5f	
1950	Sandown Champion	Mad Tanist – Good Record	23.86	J. Killeen	1/6f	Track record
1951	Mad Companion	Bellas Prince – Maddest Yet	23.88	Jack McAllister	4/7f	
1952	Kilrid Blackbird	Dante the Great – Kilrid Colleen	23.90	P. J. Maguire	4/1	
1953	Mushera Shaggy	Shaggy Lad – Mushera Farloe	23.99	Jack McAllister	1/2f	
1954	Hi There	Slaney Record – Dublin Red	24.51	Jack McAllister	1/1f	
1955	Claremont John	Derrycrussan – Claremont Girl	23.77	J. J. Campbell	4/1	
1956	Keep Moving	Imperial Dancer – California	23.65	Malachy McKenna	2/5f	Track record
1957	Coakfield Hero	Baytown Coak – Queen of the Mountain	24.04		4/1	
1958	Obeeda's Son	Imperial Dancer – Princess Obeeda	23.89	Malachy McKenna	7/1	
1959	Clougharevan Boy	Glittering Look – Manhattan Heiress	23.84	Noel Mooney	4/5f	
1960	Skip's Choice	Romolas Dante – Phil Skip	23.92	Gay McKenna	2/1f	
1961	Highland Fame	unknown – unknown	24.22	Paddy Tubridy	3/1	
1962	Tanyard Chef	Tanyard Champion – Flexions Glow	23.96	Paddy Burns	6/4f	
1963	Melody Wonder	Pigalle Wonder – Racing Millie	24.17	Jack Mullan	6/4f	
1964	Dorado	Champions Son – Last July	24.08	J. Quigley	10/1	
1965	Bauhus	Solar Prince – Lovely Sister	23.73	Ger McKenna	7/4f	
1966	Hairdresser	The Glen Abbey - Billum	23.89	Vincent Toner	4/1	
1967	Mullaghroe Hiker	Knockrour Again – Carless Fire	23.72	Jack Mullan	6/4f	
1968	Dry Flash	Prairie Flash – Newhill Snowdrop	24.10	Bobby McBride	10/1	dead-heat
1968	Newhill Printer	Prairie Flash – Newhill Snowdrop	24.10	Bobby McBride	10/1	dead-heat
1969	Move Gas	Dandy Man – Move Sally	23.60	Ger McKenna	6/1	Track record
1970	Gaultier Swank	Yanka Boy – Gaultier Hi	24.00	Jack Flynn	9/2	
1971	Benbradagh Luck	Lucky Wonder – Gentle Star	23.74	A. Nelson	2/5f	
1972	Clashing	Yanka Boy – Bresheen Peg	23.72	Colm & Mary McGrath	3/1	
1973	Get The Point	Shauns Ticket – Itsamint	23.87	Leslie McNair	6/1	
1974	Empty Pride	Own Pride – Chick Chick	24.05	Jack Mullan	6/1	
1975	Rapid Roger	Kerry Wonder – Rapid Smokey	23.58	Colm & Mary McGrath	4/5f	
1976	Thurles Yard	Bright Lad – Backyard Girl	24.04	Brendan Matthews		
1977	Land Power	Power to Spare – Rayhill Meg	23.97	Billy Anthony	7/1	
1978	Noble Brigg	Faction Fighter – Noble Lynn	23.76	Artie McGookin		
1979	La Cosa Nostra	Rockfield Era – Mafia Poppy	23.82	Jim McGuinness	8/1	
1980	Blue Train	Never So Gay – Ballagan View	23.77	Tom Woods	5/1	
1981	Noble Legion	Faction Fighter – Noble Lynn	23.78	Artie McGookin	4/1	
1982	Otago	Fair Boot – Gulleen Primrose	23.56	Jimmy Johnston	4/6f	
1983	I'm Slippy	Laurdella Fun – Glenroe Boss	23.50	John Quinn	4/9f	
1984	Market Major	Tender Hothead – Market Telex	23.78	Jack Mullan	4/7f	
1985	Arties Rover	Knockash Rover – Noble Queen	23.79	J. Whiteside	9/1	
1986	Autumn Magic	Tender Hothead – Long Bar	23.53	John Quigley	2/5f	
1987	Oran Flash	Oran Jack – Warm Wind	23.72	Bill McCreary	2/1jf	
1988	Lisnakill Carmel	Hay Maker Mac – Lisnakill Mist	23.44	Davy Lennon	1/1f	
1989	Macs Lock	Quare Rocket – Killetra Queen	23.86	Tom Fox	3/1	
1990	Leaders Best	For Real – Leaders Exile	23.40	Matt O'Donovan	4/1	
1991	Hawaiian Knight	Flag Star – Dancing Dream	23.35	Alan Black	2/1f	
1992	Boyne Walk	I'm Slippy – Tiger Hart	23.30	Seamus Graham	2/1	
1993	Ballyfolion Shy	Meeniyan Prince – Ballyfolian Jig	23.16	John Hyland	2/1f	
1994	Jackies Phantom	Phantom Flash - Dainty Queen	23.31	Matt O'Donnell	3/1	
1995	Analysis	Mid Clare Champ – Glenmoira	23.39	Francis Murray	2/1	
1996	Old Kingdom	Mid Clare Champ – Sunstory	23.42	F. Sibley	7/1	
1997-1998 not held
1999	Quarter to Five	Boyne Walk – Gig of Gold	20.24	Paul Hennessy	6/4	
2000	Knockeevan Star	Slaneyside Hare – Rubys Bridge	20.14	Tom Flaherty	7/2	
2001	Fact File	Thorgil Tex – Lady Be Silent	20.06	Jerry Melia	9/4	
2002	Fast Gladiator	Roanokee – Stocks The Rocks	20.28	Seamus Hagan	2/1	
2004	Lowtown Supreme	Arrigle Phantom – Silver Side	21.94	Ray Kavanagh	7/2	
2005	Mabels Dilemma	Roanokee – Adriennes Beauty	21.11	Gerry Holian	4/6f	Track record
2006	Smart Teddy	Go Wild Teddy – Quick Sweep	21.31	Joe Blair	4/1	
2007	Johnny Gatillo	Top Honcho – Corries Kate	21.26	Martin Lanney	7/1	
2008	Allmightyjack	Tucks Mein – Lethal Claudia	21.08	James Roche	2/1	
2009	Inny Blue	Honcho Classic – Sydney Swan	21.15	John McGee Sr.	9/2	
2010	Sheepwalk Mac	Ballymac Maeve – Crazy Jane	21.08	Michael Taggart	4/5f	
2011	Shoemakers Lad	Brett Lee – Ms Pepinstep	21.10	Thomas Harte	6/1	
2012	Cambushmore	Head Bound – Maryanns Venture	21.01	Graham Holland	7/2	
2013	Razldazl Rioga	Brett Lee – Razldazl Pearl	21.27	Dolores Ruth	13/2	
2014	Crokers Champ	Kinloch Brae – Honey Shine	21.18	Peter Cronin	2/1	
2015	Slipalong Hero	Gold Slipalong – Thorns And Roses	21.31	Gerry Holian	8/1	
2016	Ballymac BigMike	Tyrur Big Mike – Ballymac Scarlet	21.01	Robert Gleeson	6/4f	
2017	Heisman	Brett Lee – Claddagh Pearl	20.96	Laurence Jones	3/1	
2018	Ardnasool Jet	Droopys Jet – Kilara Jade	21.07	Cathal McGhee	3/1	
2019	Ardnasool Jet	Droopys Jet – Kilara Jade	20.97	Cathal McGhee	6/4f	
2020	Grangeview Ten	Zero Ten – Portumna West	20.88	Patrick Guilfoyle	5/4jf	
2021	Good Cody	Definate Opinion – Soho Ark	20.86	John Kennedy Jr.	No SP	No SP due to COVID-19
2022	Hawkfield Ozark	Laughil Blake – Brownstown Tango	20.89	Keeley McGee	No SP	
2023	Carrick Aldo	Droopys Sydney – Minnies Hazel	20.80	David Murray	No SP	
2024	Broadstrand Syd	Droopys Sydney – Droopys Alice	20.67	John A. Linehan	No SP	
2025	Southwind Wild	Dorotas Wildcat – Mucky Harbour	21.08	Pat Buckley	No SP	
