= Oaks (Irish greyhound race) =

Irish greyhound racing competition

Irish Oaks
- Class: Feature Race
- Location: Shelbourne Park
- Inaugurated: 1930 (unofficial); 1932 (official)
- Sponsor: Sporting Press

Race information
- Distance: 525 yards
- Surface: Sand
- Purse: €25,000 (winner)

The Oaks is a greyhound racing competition held annually at Shelbourne Park.

First held at Harold's Cross in 1930, the event was unofficial until 1932. It is an original classic competition in the Irish racing greyhound racing calendar and was officially inaugurated in 1932 following the decision by the Irish Coursing Club to issue a new list of classic races.

The event was shared around several tracks in Ireland starting with Clonmel Greyhound Stadium from 1932 to 1933 and then the two Dublin venues of Shelbourne Park and Harold's Cross Stadium. Before World War II the old Cork Greyhound Stadium and Markets Field Greyhound Stadium in Limerick also both hosted the competition.

After the war Shelbourne Park and Harold's Cross both shared the race until sole control was taken by Shelbourne Park in 1992.

== Venues and distances ==
- 1932–1933 (Clonmel)
- 1930, 1934, 1936, 1938 (Harolds Cross)
- 1935, 1937 (Shelbourne Park)
- 1939, 1943 (Cork)
- 1942 (Limerick)
- 1944 (Harolds Cross then alternate years with Shelbourne until 1970.)
- 1970–1976, 1982, 1984, 1991 (Harolds Cross)
- 1977–1981, 1983, 1985–1990 and 1992–present (Shelbourne Park)

== Sponsors ==
- 1978–1978 (Sean Kelly Dublin Bookmakers)
- 2003–2025 (Sporting Press)

== Past winners ==
Year	Winning Greyhound	Breeding	Time (sec)	Trainer	SP	Notes/ref
1930	Keerie Brave	Mutton Cutlet – Keen Gift	30.90	Richard Keane		
1932	Queen of the Suir	Mutton Cutlet – Burette	30.80			
1933	Loophole	Open Steak – Last Plum	30.55			
1934	Chocolate Kid	Cheerful Choice – Style Kid	31.18	Tom Harty		
1935	The Fenian Bride	Mutton Cutlet – Moleskin Peggy	30.73			
1936	Chicken Sandwich	Heros Heart – Moor Girl	30.73			
1937	Godivas Turn	Prudent Turn – Poor But Honest	30.61			
1938	Gentle Sally Again	Noras Cutlet – Stream View Fashion II	30.13			
1939	Janetta Hunloke	Dee Rock – Truite Bleue	30.47			
1942	Fair Mistress	Saccadee – Edith Bronte	30.10	Frank Moore	2/7f	
1943	Mad Printer	Printer – Mad Darkie	30.05			
1944	My Little Daisy	Luck Laddie – Clongowney Girl	30.08			
1945	Paladins Charm	Uacterlainn Riac – Paladin	30.70			
1946	Cold Christmas	Tanist – Cold Evening	29.86			
1947	Belle O'Manhattan	Manhattan Midnight – Raithneach	30.46			
1948	Lovely Louisa	Mad Tanist – Fair Light	29.90	Harry Bryant		
1949	Coolkill Darkie	Mad Tanist – Braemar Mersey	30.36			
1950	Celtic Gem	Lucky Tanist – Celtic Queen	30.00			
1951	Glenco Pearl	Western Post – Pearl Hermann	30.23	Paddy Moclair		
1952	Peaceful Lady	Mad Tanist – Elm Green	29.95			
1953	Peaceful Lady	Mad Tanist – Elm Green	30.11			
1954	Wild Iris	Mad Tanist – Crosty Lady	30.04			
1955	Prairie Peg	The Grand Champion – Prairie Vixen	29.55			
1956	Baytown Dell	Ollys Pal – Baytown Brunette	29.99			
1957	Gallant Maid	The Grand Champion – Ash Haunts	30.02			
1958	Ballet Festival	Champion Prince – Peaceful Lady	29.73			
1959	Last Landing	Man Of Pleasure – Dannys Gift	30.09			
1960	Tristam	Hi There – Prairie Lil	30.03			
1961	Just Sherry	Knock Hill Chieftain – Nimble Star	29.95			
1962	Purty Good	Jungle Man – Pocket Glass	29.78			
1963	Cherry Express	Man Of Pleasure – Clementine	29.87			
1964	Knock Her	Knock Hill Chieftain – Don't Ask	29.98	T O'Shaughnessy		
1965	Drumsough	Princess Hi There – Gettysburgh Princess	29.76	Gay McKenna		
1966	Hairdresser	The Glen Abbey – Billum	29.40	Vincent Toner		
1967	Kevinsfort	Queen Prairie Flash – Miss Grindl	29.79			
1968	Orwell Parade	Racing Rory – Orwell Wonder	29.96			
1969	Itsamint	Prairie Flash – Cranog Bet	29.35			
1970	Rosmore Robin	Clonmannon Flash – Con Robin	29.60	Gay McKenna		
1971	Blissful Pride	Mad Era – Ballybeg Pride	29.30	Leslie McNair		
1972	Brandon Velvet	Brandon Jungle – Hi Trend	29.45			
1973	Romping To Work	Swanky Pa – Go To Work	29.20	Larry Kelly		
1974	Fur Collar	Yanka Boy – Handbag	29.40	Paddy Cross		
1975	Main Avenue	Kilbelin Style – Speckled Fawn	28.98			
1976	Clashing Daisy	Clashing – Chief Legacy	29.64	Eddie Spain		
1977	Snow Maiden	Sole Aim – Gallant And Gay	29.09			
1978	Hail Fun	Laurdella Fun – Westmead Hail	29.40	E McGeough	8/1	
1979	Nameless Pixie	Monalee Champion - Itsastar	29.34	Ger McKenna		
1980	Strange Legend	Sand Man – Maythorn Pride	29.34			
1981	Claremount May	Shamrock Sailor – Claremount Queen	29.52	Niall Maher	6/1	
1982	My Last Hope	Gaily Noble – Tobago Charm	29.32			
1983	Quick Suzy	Shamrock Sailor – Big Deposit	29.38	Colm McGrath		
1984	Burnpark Sally	You Genius – Burnpark Lass	28.92	Michael Browne		
1985	Airmount Jewel	Sail On II – Airmount Rose	29.06			
1986	Meadowbank Tip	Citizen Supreme – Shandon Anne	29.34			
1987	Yale Princess	Whisper Wishes – Saga Miss	29.42	Matt O'Donnell		
1988	Tracy Budd	Moral Support – Sandy Sally	29.26			
1989	Picture Card	Soda Fountain – Picture This	29.40	Seamus Connaughton		
1990	Bornacurra Liz	County Final – Lizzies Flower	29.10			
1991	Gentle Soda	Soda Fountain – Gentle Approach	29.12	Hugh Davies (Powderhall)	9/10f	
1992	Old Spinster	Glen Park Dancer – Hawkfield Music	29.42			
1993	Libertys Echo	Kyle Jack – My Liberty	29.48	Ber Murtagh		
1994	Shimmering Wings	Alpine Minister – Narabane Gosh	29.23			
1995	Cool Survivor	Lodge Prince – Gunboat Ann	29.35			
1996	Fossabeg Maid	Lodge Prince - Fossabeg Rose	29.51			
1997	Borna Best	Boyne Walk – Firm Mist	28.86	Ruairi Dwan	9/4f	
1998	April Surprise	Beaming Supreme – Serene Lady	28.95	Paul Hennessy	5/1	
1999	Borna Survivor	Staplers Jo – Cool Survivor	28.67	Ruairi Dwan	4/5f	
2000	Marinas Tina	Staplers Jo – Tina Marina	28.56	Seamus Graham	9/4f	
2001	Marinas Tina	Staplers Jo – Tina Marina	28.60	Seamus Graham	4/7f	
2002	Lifes Beauty	Staplers Jo – Annies Touch	28.70	Nick Turner	6/1	
2003	Axle Grease	Top Honcho – Fees Chance	28.64	Ollie Bray	11/-10f	
2004	Legal Moment	Judicial Pride – Legal Jan	28.59	Pat Buckley	2/1f	
2005	Grayslands Pixie	Larkhill Jo – Newry Beo	28.78	Bill O'Hare	7/4f	
2006	Shelbourne Becky	Spiral Nikita – Shanless Rose	28.58	Keeley McGee	5/2	
2007	Ms Firecracker	Magical Captain – Aughavas	28.54	Patrick Guilfoyle	10/1	
2008	Oran Majestic	Daves Mentor – Droopys Lauren	29.02	John McGee Sr.	11/10f	
2009	Skywalker Queen	Razldazl Billy – Nifty Princess	28.24	Frances O'Donnell	9/-4	
2010	Dalcash Dvinsky	Ace Hi Rumble – Dalcash Diva	28.41	Jack Meade	9/4f	
2011	Droopys Twirl	Westmead Hawk - Droopys Rena	28.42	John Linehan	2/1	
2012	Milldean Tally	Head Bound – Talita Beauty	28.75	John O'Flynn	9/4	
2013	Locnamon Bridie	Royal Impact – Locnamon Nell	28.23	Paul Hennessy	5/1	
2014	Velvet All Jam	Velvet Cash – Droopys Snowdrop	28.42	Mike Buckley	2/1	
2015	Ballydoyle Honey	Brett Lee – Kildallon Maid	28.47	Graham Holland	1/5f	
2016	Witches Belle	Droopys Scolari – Lemon Belle	28.44	Liam Twomey	6/1	
2017	Forest Natalee	Ballymac Vic – Droopys Danneel	28.37	Martin Lanney	3/1	
2018	Jaytee Jordan	Laughil Blake – Gorgeous Gal	28.47	Paul Hennessy	7/2	
2019	Killmacdonagh	Zero Ten – Deercrest Lady	28.17	Kieran Lynch	4/1	
2020	Ballymac Beanie	Ballymac Matt – Coolavanny Pet	28.18	Declan Byrne	n/a	No SP due to COVID-19
2021	Susie Sapphire	Droopys Jet – Jetstream Lynx	28.15	Owen McKenna	3/1	
2022	Raha Mofo	Droopys Sydney – Clares Queen	28.14	Martin 'Murt' Leahy	3/1	
2023	Crafty Shivoo	Droopys Sydney – Ballymac Sanjose	28.14	Peter & Brian Divilly	3/1	
2024	A Lucky Julie	Ballymac Bolger – Julies Paradise	28.53	James Melia	3/1	dead-heat
2024	Fleadh Saraide	Ballymac Best – Fleadh Ramona	28.53	Murt Leahy	14/1	dead-heat
2025	Carrigmore Freya	Droopys Sydney – Carrigmore Dizzy	28.17	Graham Holland	9/4f	
