= Shelbourne 600 =

Irish greyhound racing competition

- Class: Feature
- Location: Shelbourne Park
- Inaugurated: 1964

Race information
- Distance: 600 yards
- Surface: Sand
- Purse: €15,000 (winner)

The Shelbourne 600 is a greyhound racing competition held annually at Shelbourne Park in Ringsend, Dublin, Ireland.

It is one of the leading competitions for stayers in the Irish racing greyhound racing calendar and was inaugurated in 1964.

== Past winners ==
Year	Winner	Breeding	Time (sec)	Trainer	SP	Notes/ref
1964	Cranog Bet	Knock Hill Chieftain – Don't Bet	33.60	Phil Rees		
1965	Faithful Hope	Solar Prince – Millie Hawthorn	33.51	Paddy Keane		
1966	Val's Prince	Oregon Prince – Vals Orphan	33.30	Paddy Turbridy		
1967	Limits Crackers	Odd Venture – Pats Regret	33.50	Jim Quinn		
1968	Russian Gun	Pigalle Wonder – Shandaroba	33.48	Tom Lynch		
1969	Itsamint	Prairie Flash – Cranog Bet	33.69	Leslie McNair		
1970	Mic Mac	Monalee Champion – Yurituni	33.65	Jack Flynn		
1971	Postal Vote	Dusty Trail – Paddistar	33.27	Gay McKenna		
1972	Itsachampion	Monalee Champion – Cranog Bet	33.45	Ger McKenna		
1973	Case Money	Booked Out – Jamboree Judy	33.68	J Daly		
1974	Tommy Astaire	Ivy Hall Flash – Miami Star	33.56	Paddy Keane		
1975	Ballybeg Prim	Rockfield Era – Ballybeg Pride	33.40	Ger McKenna		
1976	Ballybeg Prim	Rockfield Era – Ballybeg Pride	34.05	Ger McKenna		
1977	Heres Tat	Heres Sonny – Spiral Drish	33.26	P Fennessey		
1978	Ivy Hall Solo	Itsachampion – Hall Joy	33.47	D Hoctor		
1979	Tough Decision	Minnesota Miller – Carters Drain	33.72	Tommy Kane		
1980	Ballarat Prince	Free Speech - Coaster	33.54	Miss P McGrath		
1981	Macintosh Mentor	Sage – Mackintosh Might	33.78	T Mullen		
1982	Millbowe Sam	Millcock – Tetty Bowe	33.73	J Monaghan		
1983	Debbycot Lad	Liberty Lad – Knockshe Hopeful	33.50	C Morris		
1984	Killowna Gem	Suir Miller – Carters Drain	33.23	B Montgomery		
1985	Lispopple Story	Liberty Lad – Lispopple Blast	33.73	Noel Kinsella		
1986	Oughter Brigg	Noble Brigg – Dromacossane	33.76	Sean Bourke		
1987	Murlens Slippy	Im Slippy – Murlens Chill	33.50	John Quinn	5/2	
1988	Manorville Major	Moral Support – Westmead City	33.32	Paddy Doran	4/1	
1989	Gourmet Manor	Manorville Sand – Annagh Moth	33.45	Gerry Duffin	9/2	
1990	Colorado Holly	Wise Band – Denver Minnie	33.56	Eugene Price	5/1	
1991	Fly Cruiser	Moral Support – Lauragh Pride	33.31	Ann Power	5/4f	
1992	Trudy's Fox	Curryhills Fox – Ballinclare Joy	33.61	Cecil Todd	7/1	
1993	Castleland Dream	Powerstown Pax – Sail On Watch	33.40	Christy O'Callaghan	6/1	
1994	Tip Top	Im Slippy – Dream Orchid	33.16	Michael Enright	11/8f	
1995	Druid's Omega	Droopys Merson – Droopys Heather	33.61	John McGee	9/2	
1996	Brickfield Blaze	Daleys Gold – Kehers First	33.45	Martin Broughan	6/4f	
1997	Spiral Nikita	Phantom Flash – Minnies Nikita	33.35	Eileen Gleeson	3/1	
1998	Real Branch	Right Move – Real Branch	33.22	Denise Shanahan	3/1	
1999	Frisby Flashing	Frightful Flash – Centenarys Dream	32.83	Reggie Roberts	12/1	
2000	Joannestown Cash	Cry Dalcash – Ali Sheba	32.49	Paul Hennessy	6/4f	Track record
2001	Late Late Show	Spiral Nikita – Ullid Citrate	32.20	Paul Hennessy	2/7f	Track record
2002	Haliska Vienna	Smooth Rumble – Daleys Heartrob	32.69	Paul Hennessy	20/1	
2003	The Other Master	Boyne Walk – The Other Joy	32.81	Matt O'Donnell	4/1	
2004	Awesome Impact	Jamella Prince – Able Ivy	32.44	Geraldine Fitzpatrick	11/4	
2005	Satellite Flight	Sonic Flight - Lazzari	32.52	Frances O'Donnell	7/4jf	
2006	Tyrur Ted	Top Honcho – Watch the Market	32.48	Paul Hennessy	8/11f	
2007	Ardkill Jamie	Top Savings – Fast Issue	32.68	Paul Hennessy	5/4f	
2008	College Causeway	Go Wild Teddy – College Tina	32.64	Pat Buckley	1/2f	
2009	Accordello	Westmead Hawk – Coffee In Brazil	32.57	Lar Kinsella	3/1	
2010	Shaneboy Lee	Brett Lee – Shaneboy Ruth	32.53	Denis Kiely	7/1	
2011	Kingo	Kinloch Brae – Razldazl Pearl	32.68	Dolores Ruth	4/6f	
2012	Kingo	Kinloch Brae – Razldazl Pearl	32.40	Dolores Ruth	6/1	
2013	Ringtown Snowy	Head Bound – Ringtown Blue	32.75	Paul Hennessy	4/1	
2014	Greenwell Hulk	Westmead Hawk – Greenwell Puma	32.24	James Melia	4/7f	
2015	Ballymac Matt	Tyrur Big Mike – Ballymac Scarlet	32.13	Liam Dowling	1/1f	
2016	Ballyhooly Henry	Tyrur Big Mike – Lemon Soul	32.24	Tom O'Neill	4/7f	
2017	No race due to protests by the Dublin Greyhound Owners and Breeders Association.					
2018	Javielenko	Ballymac Eske – Droopys Hilda	32.61	Pat Buckley	12/1	
2019	Clonbrien Prince	Confident Rankin – Mongys Rach	32.24	Graham Holland	9/2	
2020	No race due to (COVID-19 pandemic)					
2021	Ballymac Kingdom	Definate Opinion – Coolavanny Angie	32.30	Liam Dowling	No SP	No SP due to COVID-19
2022	Fast Fit Paddy	Ballymac Vic – Rosmult Martha	31.96	Declan McDonagh	11/4	
2023	Ballinabola Ed	Confident Rankin – Dolls Lady	32.49	Pat Buckley	1/3f	
2024	Ryhope Beach	Droopys Sydney – Calzaghe Jan	32.23	Michael J O'Donovan	2/1	
2025	Ballyhooly Bruno	Jacob Tashadelek – Foyle Lucy	32.28	Tom O'Neill	4/1	

== Venues and distances ==
- 1964–present (Shelbourne 600 yards)

== Sponsors ==
- 1964–2000 (Guinness)
- 2001–2009 (Ladbrokes)
- 2010–2011 (Hegarty Bookmakers)
- 2012–2012 (Betfair)
- 2013–2013 (Ladbrokes)
- 2014–2019 (Gain)
- 2023–2023 (RPGTV)
