= Irish Greyhound Derby =

Greyhound racing competition

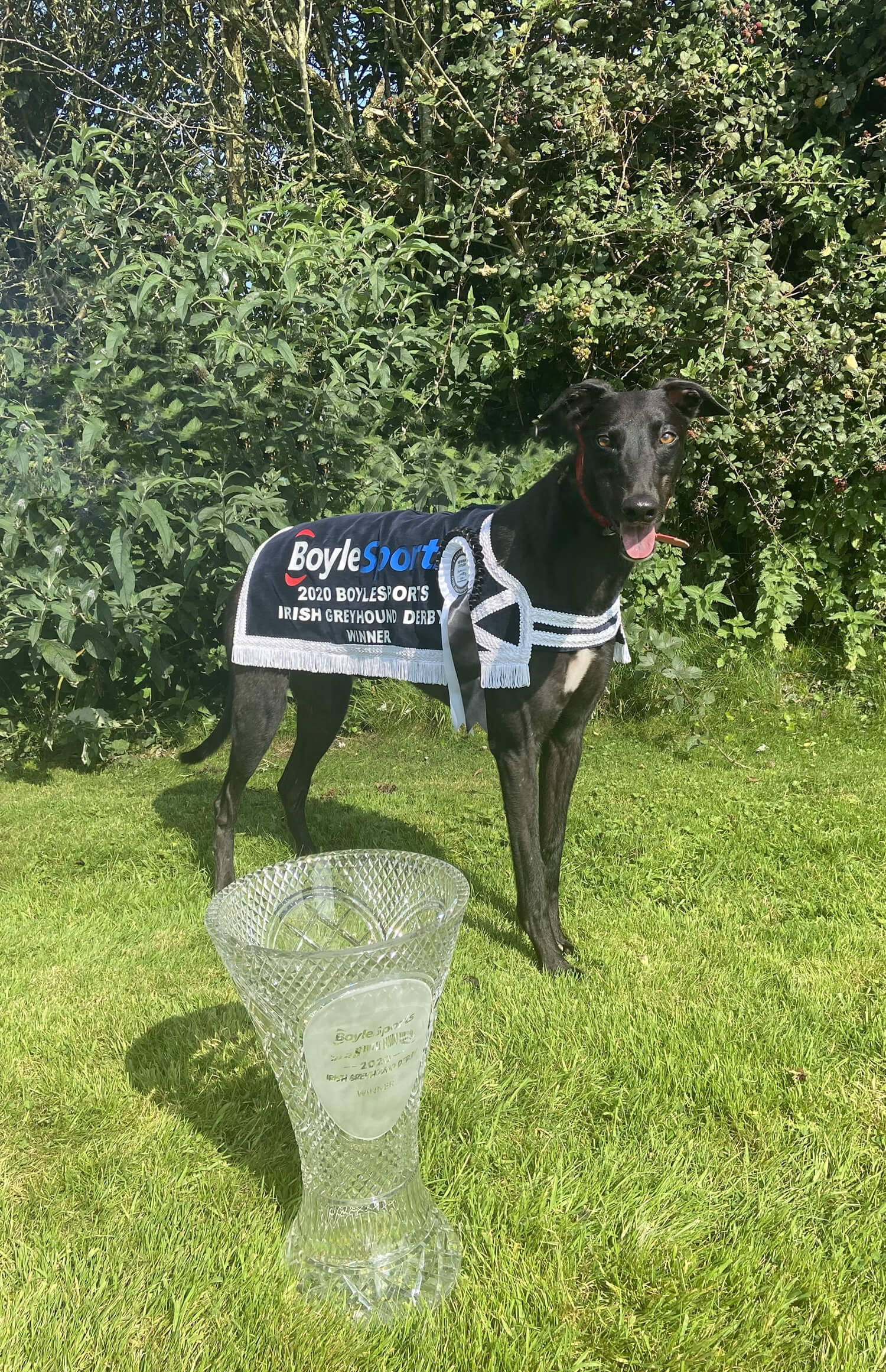
- 2020 winner Newinn Taylor
- Location: Shelbourne Park
- Inaugurated: 1928 (unofficial); 1932 (official)
- Sponsor: BoyleSports

Race information
- Distance: 550 yards
- Surface: Sand
- Purse: €300,000 (winner €125,000)

The Irish Greyhound Derby held at Shelbourne Park, is the premier greyhound racing competition in Ireland.

First held at Harold's Cross in 1928, the event was unofficial until 1932 and called the National Derby. The first winner in 1928 was Tipperary Hills who won in a time of 30.56 sec at a starting price of 1-1f.

It controversially switched to Shelbourne Park in 1932 and then it was held in alternate years between the two tracks.

The defunct Markets Field Greyhound Stadium in Limerick and the defunct Cork Greyhound Stadium in Western Road both hosted the event once in 1939 and 1942 respectively. The 1969 Irish Greyhound Derby was the last renewal held at Harold's Cross and the competition remained at Shelbourne Park from 1970. The most successful greyhound has been Spanish Battleship who won the event three times.

Today it is considered to be one of the two biggest races in the calendar by the UK & Ireland greyhound racing industries, alongside the English Greyhound Derby.

== Venues and distances ==
- Harolds Cross (1928–1931, then alternate years until 1967)
- Limerick (1939)
- Cork (1942)
- Shelbourne Park (1932, then alternate years until 1967)
- Shelbourne Park (1968–1985, 525 yards)
- Shelbourne Park (1986–present, 550 yards)

== Statistics ==
Stat	Comment
Most wins	3; Spanish Battleship 1953, 1954, 1955
Winning trainer	Graham Holland (5); Gay McKenna, Tom Lynch, (4); Ger McKenna, Matt O'Donnell, Seamus Graham (all 3)
Winning Bitches	9; 1933, 1937, 1941, 1972, 1979, 1990, 1996, 1999, 2021
Starting Prices	Shortest winners: 2024 (3/10f), 1954 (4/11f) Longest winners: 1996 (14–1)
Dual Derby winners	Toms the Best

== Past winners ==
Year	Winning Greyhound	Breeding	Trainer	Owner	Breeder
1928	Tipperary Hills	Melksham Tom – Na Boc E	Billy Quinn	Billy Quinn	
1929	Jack Bob	Orkit – Tottie Longsocks	H Yeats	Miss P Harris	Mick Lynch
1930	Prince Fern	Green Fern – Run Around	James Harper	James Harper	
1931	Little Chummie	Bottle – Coolalong Girl	Billy Quinn	Michael Grace	Michael Grace (Callan)
1932	Guideless Joe	Guiding Hand – Flaming Fire	Mick Horan	Jack Moylan	Cornelius Forde
1933	Monologue	Mutton Cutlet – High Force	Luke Maher	Luke Maher	John Hughes
1934	Frisco Hobo	Hidden Badger – Pykes Peak	Tom Harty	Tim Fennin	
1935	Roving Yank	Roving Bunty – Yankey Land	Tom Harty	Billy Dunne	Michael Ryan (Tipperary)
1936	Minstrel Rover	Dick The Rover – Hogans Choice	Michael Sheehan	Michael Sheehan	Charlie Grumbridge (Fermoy)
1937	Muinessa	Slanebeg – Won But Los	Nuala O'Byrne	Nuala O'Byrne	Simon Garrahan (Rathconrath)
1938	Abbeylara	Prudent Turn – That's The Why	Tom Black	Tom Black	Larry Kiernan (Granard)
1939	Marchin' Thro' Georgia	Church Parade – Stone Park	J.J.Doran	A. Morton	
1940	Tanist	Inler – Tranquila	Billy Quinn	Arthur Probert	Father Browne
1941	Brave Damsel	Maidens Boy – Queen of the Suir	Paddy Kelly	John Byrne	John Byrne (Tipperary)
1942	Uacterlainn Riac	Creamery Border – Roisin Riac	John Crowley	Jerry Crowley	S Riordan (Cork)
1943	Famous Knight	Highland Rum – Flyers Fortune	Bertie Tierney	Miss R Monaghan	Flynn
1944	Clonbonny Bridge	Melksham Nobody – Bridge of Avon	A O'Neill	A O'Neill	
1945	Lilacs Luck	Printer – Wilton Sandills	Paddy Byrne	M Coolican	
1946	Steve	Printer – Verge of Palm	Harry O'Neill	Mrs R.H. Dent	Pat Redmond (The Harrow)
1947	Daring Flash	Tanist – Daring Lady	Mary d'Arcy	Mary d'Arcy	Mary d'Arcy (Kilternan)
1948	Western Post	Lucky Post – Lonesome Sister	Paddy Moclair	Frank Davis	Brother Brouther (Newcastle West)
1949	Spanish Lad	Shaggy Lad – Cordal Moonlight	Tim (Chubb) O'Connor	Tim (Chubb) O'Connor	Tim (Chubb) O'Connor (Killorglin)
1950	Crossmolina Rambler	Tanner Trail – Reney's Delight	Anthony Meenaghan	Frank Fox	Tadgh Drummond (Kerry)
1951	Carmodys Tanist	Mad Tanist – Castletown Skinner	Dicky Myles	Frances Chandler	
1952	Rough Waters	D X Rice – Just Push	Henry Lalor	Patricia Lalor	John Byrne (Duncormick)
1953	Spanish Battleship	Spanish Chestnut – Ballyseedy Memory	Tom Lynch	Tim (Chubb) O'Connor	Tadgh Drummond (Kerry)
1954	Spanish Battleship	Spanish Chestnut – Ballyseedy Memory	Tom Lynch	Tim (Chubb) O'Connor	Tadgh Drummond (Kerry)
1955	Spanish Battleship	Spanish Chestnut – Ballyseedy Memory	Tom Lynch	Tim (Chubb) O'Connor	Tadgh Drummond (Kerry)
1956	Keep Moving	Imperial Dancer – California	Tommy Ferguson	Mrs Kathleen McBride	Crean
1957	Hopeful Cutlet	Imperial Dancer – Katie The Duck	Jack Mullan	Chris Farrelly	
1958	Colonel Perry	Olly's Quare Rebel – Ashgrove Breeze	Jack Nallen	Mrs Olive Tasker	Larry Cribbin (Edenderry)
1959	Sir Frederick	Champion Prince – Charming Biddy	Tom Harty	Mrs Hannah Cronin	Jimmy Walsh (Waterford)
1960	Perrys Apple	Only Perry – Ryans Demon	Paddy Behan	Paddy Behan	Charlie Weld (Robertstown)
1961	Chieftains Guest	Knock Hill Chieftain – Star Guest	Leslie McNair	McNair & Eric MCullough	Leslie McNair
1962	Shanes Legacy	Knock Hill Chieftain – Betsy	Bob McCann	Bob McCann	Bob McCann (Randalstown)
1963	Drumahiskey Venture	Odd Venture – Drumahiskey Girl	Mrs Eithne Hammond	Mrs Eithne Hammond	Mrs Eithne Hammond (Ballymena)
1964	Wonder Valley	Pigalle Wonder – Racing Millie	Jack Mullan	Jack Mullan	
1965	Ballyowen Chief	Oregon Prince – Earnest Lady	Gay McKenna	Mrs Lillie McKenna	
1966	Always Proud	Clonalvy Pride – Always A Rebel	Gay McKenna	Albert Lucas	Albert Lucas (Bray)
1967	Russian Gun	Pigalle Wonder – Shandaroba	Tom Lynch	Hugh Marley	Frank Muldoon (Dungannon)
1968	Yellow Printer	Printer's Prince – Yellow Streak	John Bassett (England)	Miss Pauline Wallis & Sir Robert Adeane	
1969	Own Pride	Always Proud – Kitty True	Ger McKenna	Tom O'Doherty	Ignatius Kelly (Cooraclare)
1970	Monalee Pride	Prairie Flash – Sheila at Last	Gay McKenna	Dave Cahill	Bertie Hatton (Enniscorthy)
1971	Sole Aim	Monalee Champion – Yurituni	David Geggus (England)	Mrs Frances Chandler	
1972	Catsrock Daisy	Fantastic Prince – Truly Silver	Gay McKenna	Matt Bruton & Cyril Scotland	Mrs Ann Rellis (Waterford)
1973	Bashful Man	Myross Again – Ballyflake	Ger McKenna	Deirdre Hynes	Mrs Nancy Dirrane (Kilmallock)
1974	Lively Band	Silver Hope – Kell's Queen	Jack Murphy	Cyril Scotland	Denis Clancy
1975	Shifting Shadow	Clonsherry – Queens Parachute	Podger Molloy	Brian Donovan & Michael Cummiskey	Paddy O'Connor
1976	Tain Mor	Monalee Champion – An Tain	Paddy & Jack Nolan	Miss Aifric Campbell	Paddy & Jack Nolan (County Wexford)
1977	Linda's Champion	Monalee Champion – Merry Linda	Michael Barrett	Michael Barrett	Michael Barrett (Ballingarry)
1978	Pampered Rover	Time Up Please – Pampered Peggy	Paddy Keane	Joe Phelan	Joe Phelan (Conahy, County Kilkenny)
1979	Penny County	Dark Mercury – Columbcille Aim	Matt Travers	Paddy Hurney & Sean Dunne	Con Moore (Thomastown)
1980	Suir Miller	Minnesota Miller – More Cream	Michael Barrett	Elizabeth Flood	Elizabeth Flood (Tipperary)
1981	Bold Work	Itsachampion – Silver Moll	Frank O'Regan	Breda O'Regan	Michael Foley
1982	Cooladine Super	Tranquility Sea – Cooladine Ruby	Colm McGrath	Siobhan Kenny	
1983	Belvedere Bran	Brave Bran – Knock Out	Dermot O'Sullivan	Con O'Sullivan	Thomas McSherry (Nenagh)
1984	Dipmac	Sand Man – Kind of Luxury	Seamus Graham	Paschal Taggart & Noel Ryan	Seamus Graham (County Laois)
1985	Tubbercurry Lad	Liberty Lad – Tubbercurry Nancy	Charlie Faul	Michael Costelloe	Charlie Faul (Sligo)
1986	Kyle Jack	Oran Jack – Lady Barbara	John Field	Michael Field	Batt O'Keeffe (Kerry)
1987	Rathgallen Tady	Overdraught Pet – Mea West	Ger McKenna	Eddie Costello	Colm McCarthy (Golden)
1988	Make History	Game Ball – Raymonds Pride	Johnny Quigley	Paul McKinney & John Kelly	Ramie Dowling (Kilkenny)
1989	Manorville Magic	Manorville Sand – Black Vision	Paddy Doran	Catherine Doran	Catherine Doran (Tipperary)
1990	The Other Toss	The Other Risk – Knocknaboha Snap	Matt O'Donnell	John Houilhan	Michael Lonergan (Cahir)
1991	Ardfert Mick	Ardfert Sean – Boher Rita	Matt O'Donnell	Noel Clifford	Maurice Harty (Kerry)
1992	Manx Treasure	Greenpark Fox – Minorcas Fuchsia	Michael O'Sullivan	John Guilford	John Guilford (Isle of Man)
1993	Daleys Denis	Daleys Gold – Lisnakill Flyer	Brendan Mullan	George Davenport & Patrick Keating	John O'Brien (Surrey)
1994	Joyful Tidings	Whisper Wishes – Newmans Mall	Donie O'Regan	Michael Carmody	Donal O'Connor (Tipperary)
1995	Batties Rocket	Batties Whisper – Lady Arrancourt	Matt O'Donnell	Alicia Swaffield	Alicia Swaffield (Wheldrake, York)
1996	Tina Marina	Phantom Flash – Minnies Nikita	Seamus Graham	Greenvale+	Elizabeth Maher (Tipperary)
1997	Toms The Best	Frightful Flash – Ladys Guest	Nick Savva (England)	Eddie Shotton	Ian Greaves (Kildare)
1998	Eyeman	Double Bid – Minglers Magic	Eddie Wade	Gerard Kervick	Jim Moore (Carrigeen)
1999	Spring Time	Vintage Prince – Meantime	Gerald Watson	Gerald Watson	Charles Magill (Larne)
2000	Judicial Pride	Thorgil Tex – Dons Pride	Michael O'Donovan	Pat Daly	Michael Walsh (Knocknagoshel)
2001	Cool Performance	Mustang Jack – Pony Nikita	Sean Bourke	Patsy Byrne & Mick Gleeson	P.J. Keane (Abbeydorney)
2002	Bypass Byway	Spiral Nikita – Sandy Penny	Ollie Bray	Michael Kearney	Pat D'Arcy (Clare)
2003	Climate Control	Larkhill Jo – Ballinclare Star	Seamus Graham	Kevin Smith & Aidan O'Regan	Ailish & Ailsing McCann (Wexford)
2004	Like A Shot	Larkhill Jo – Blackstone Lace	Owen McKenna	Michael Kelly	Patrick Sinnott (Kells)
2005	He Said So	Top Honcho – You Said So	Tim O'Donovan	Jim Hennessy & Tim O'Donovan	Mick O'Donovan (Cork)
2006	Razldazl Billy	Brett Lee – Inky Black	Dolores Ruth	Liam Marks	Tommy Holden/Michael Power (Youghal)
2007	Tyrur Rhino	Tyrur Ted – Tyrur Marita	Paul Hennessy	P.J. Fahy	P.J. Fahy (Galway)
2008	Shelbourne Aston	Just The Best – Queen Survivor	Pat Curtin	Curtin-Hehir-Montgomery+	John Marks (Tipperary)
2009	College Causeway	Go Wild Teddy – College Tina	Pat Buckley	Mike & Vincent McKenna	Frank Culloty (Kerry)
2010	Tyrur McGuigan	Brett Lee – Tyrur Temptress	Conor Fahy	P.J. Fahy	P.J. Fahy (Galway)
2011	Razldazl George	Kinloch Brae – Razldazl Pearl	Dolores Ruth	Dazzling+	Dolores Ruth (Kildare)
2012	Skywalker Puma	Royal Impact – Dianas Ranger	Frances O'Donnell	Ray Patterson	Paddy Purtill (Lisselton)
2013	Slippery Robert	Hondo Black – Steamy Windows	Robert Gleeson	Larry Dunne	Larry Dunne (Louth)
2014	Laughil Blake	Brett Lee – Laughil Lass	Michael O'Donovan	Mary & Paul Jennings	Mary Jennings (Offaly)
2015	Ballymac Matt	Tyrur Big Mike – Ballymac Scarlet	Liam Dowling	Ballymac-kelly-and-the-lads+	Liam Dowling (Kerry)
2016	Rural Hawaii	Head Bound – Duck Fat	Graham Holland	Helen & Michael O'Dwyer	Michael O'Dwyer (Clonmel)
2017	Good News	Definate – Pippy	Patrick Guilfoyle	Sandra Guilfoyle & Mary Kennedy	John Kennedy (Thurles)
2018	Ballyanne Sim	Confident Rankin – Freedom Shadow	James Robinson	Eamon Cleary	Kathleen Pomfret
2019	Lenson Bocko	Droopys Jet – Melodys Diamond	Graham Holland	Lochead-Ponder-Whelan+	Patrick Collins (Ballylongford)
2020	Newinn Taylor	Droopys Buick – Newinn Expert	Graham Holland	Simon Taylor	Jim O'Donnell
2021	Susie Sapphire	Droopys Jet – Jetstream Lynx	Owen McKenna	Peter Comerford	Peter Comerford
2022	Born Warrior	Ballymac Best – Mountaylor Queen	Jennifer O'Donnell	Whatever-you-like Syndicate	Jennifer O'Donnell
2023	The Other Kobe	Ballymac Best – Mountaylor Queen	Jennifer O'Donnell	Brian Clare & David L'Estrange	Jennifer O'Donnell
2024	Bockos Diamond	Dorotas Wildcat – Seaglass Shadow	Graham Holland	Remember Them+	Joseph O'Connor
2025	Cheap Sandwiches	Burgess Bucks – Hearthill Josie	Graham Holland	Bark Wahlberg+	Joseph O'Connor
