= Corbiewood Stadium =

Harness and greyhound racing track in Scotland

- Location: Pirnhall Road, near Bannockburn, Stirling, Scotland FK7 8AB
- Coordinates: 56°04′57″N 3°54′48″W

Corbiewood Stadium was a Harness racing stadium and greyhound racing track near Bannockburn, Stirling, Scotland. It is now the site of a new housing development.

== History ==
The stadium took its name from 'Corbie Wood' the woodland that the stadium was built on; the site was also a former trial shaft from an old coal pit. The stadium was built in the sixties by haulage contractor brothers James and Daniel Taylor.

== Harness Racing ==
The stadium was used for American-style harness racing also known as trotting races. The races normally took place from May until November. Facilities included a glass fronted cafe and bar with seating overlooking the track.

== Greyhound racing ==
The greyhound track was situated inside the trotting track. Race distances were 120, 300, 330, 500 and 550 yards and an 'Inside Sumner' hare system was used. The racing was independent (unlicensed) and took place on Tuesday and Friday evenings. The greyhound racing existed from 1969 until 2010 (although not continuous); it re-opened during September 1984 for the second spell under promoter Ernie De Rosa.
