= 1965 Irish Greyhound Derby =

- Venue: Harold's Cross Stadium
- Location: Dublin
- End date: 7 August
- Total prize money: £2,000 (winner)

The 1965 Irish Greyhound Derby took place during July and August with the final being held at Harold's Cross Stadium in Dublin on 7 August 1965.

The winner Ballyowen Chief won £2,000 and was trained by Gay McKenna and owned by Lillie McKenna.

== Final result ==
At Harold's Cross, 7 August (over 525 yards):

Position	Winner	Breeding	Trap	SP	Time	Trainer
1st	Ballyowen Chief	Oregon Prince - Earnest Lady	2	5-1	29.42	Gay McKenna
2nd	Tanyard Heather	Oregon Prince - Clonbanin Chariot	1	100-30	29.66	P Cashman
3rd	Hack Up Chieftain	Knock Hill Chieftain - Bunclody Queen	4	100-7	29.74	
unplaced	Fraoc	Knock Hill Chieftain - Corca	3	9-4		
unplaced	Val's Prince	Oregon Prince - Val's Orphan	6	7-2		Paddy Turbridy
unplaced	Dorado	Champions Son - Last July	5	8-1		

=== Distances ===
3, 1 (lengths)

== Competition Report ==
Gay McKenna finally won the Irish Derby with Ballyowen Chief a greyhound he trained for his wife Lillie. The McKenna family had gone close in the past with Gay’s father Joe finishing runner up back in 1934. With the prize money for the Irish Derby now at a record £2,000, Gay McKenna kept Ballyowen Chief in his own kennel following the request from his owner Martin Kelly to find a buyer for the greyhound. McKenna's wife Lillie bought the dog and entered him for the Derby.

The competition had started with Monalee King being made ante-post favourite followed by Lovely Chieftain, Clomoney Grand, Ballyowen Chief and Bauhus in a lineup that included 1964 English Greyhound Derby champion Hack Up Chieftain. Hack Up Chieftain available at 20-1 ante post, went fastest in the opening round recording 29.28, just half a length outside of the track record. Ballyowen Chief won in 29.32 and Irish Laurels champion Tanyard Heather in 29.40. Other winners were Clomoney Grand (29.45) and Wise Acre (29.46).

Hack Up Chieftain, went from strength to strength winning well in the second round beating Ballyowen Chief by five lengths in 29.28. Monalee King and Clomoney Grand were both eliminated but Val's Prince and Always Proud won their heats.

In the semi-finals Hack Up Chieftain won again beating Tanyard Heather. Vals Prince defeated Fraoc in the second semi-final decider and the last one was won by Dorado from Ballyowen Chief.

In the final Ballyowen Chief ran a superb race to catch early leader Tanyard Heather and the former eased to a three length victory, Hack up Chieftain was unlucky after finding trouble and ran on strongly for third place.

== See also ==
- 1965 UK & Ireland Greyhound Racing Year
