= Gay McKenna =

Irish greyhound trainer

Personal information
- Born: Birr, County Offaly, Ireland
- Died: 10 September 2004 Dublin, Ireland
- Occupation: Greyhound trainer

Sport
- Sport: Greyhound racing

Achievements and titles
- National finals: Derby wins: Irish Greyhound Derby (1965, 1966, 1970, 1972); Classic and feature wins: Irish Cesarewitch (1970, 1973); Irish National Sprint (1960); Irish Oaks (1965, 1970); Shelbourne 600 (1971)

Gay McKenna (– 10 September 2004) was an Irish greyhound trainer who won the Irish Greyhound Derby five times. He was considered the leading trainer in Ireland from 1960 until 1972.

== Early life ==
McKenna was born in Birr, County Offaly. He operated his kennels at Cabinteely, Dublin, which he bought in 1948. He was introduced to the sport by his father Joe McKenna who had two finalists in the 1934 Irish Greyhound Derby and won the 1936 Irish Grand National. Gay was the older cousin of Ger McKenna.

== Career ==
After many attempts, in 1965 he won the 1965 Irish Greyhound Derby with Ballyowen Chief. He repeated the feat a year later with Always Proud. In 1971, Monalee Pride provided the third success for and a fourth and final win in 1972 by Catsrock Daisy.

In addition, McKenna also won the Irish Oaks with Drumsough Princess (1965) and Rosmore Robin (1970), the Irish Cesarewitch with Postal Vote (1970) and Rita's Choice (1973), and the Irish National Sprint with Skip's Choice (1960).

The four Irish Derby titles remains a record today equalled only by his brother-in-law Tom Lynch.

== Death and family ==
McKenna died when the 2004 Irish Derby competition was taking place on 10 September. At the time of his death, the Cabinteely kennels were run by his son G. J. McKenna. That Derby final was won by Owen McKenna (Gay's first cousin once removed) and the runner up was trained by Fraser Black (McKenna's son-in-law). Black had married his daughter Pauline.
