= Ger McKenna =

Irish greyhound racing professional trainer

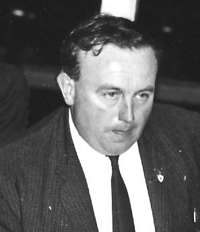

Personal information
- Born: 1930 Borrisokane, County Tipperary
- Died: 7 May 2014 (aged 83–84)
- Occupation: Greyhound trainer

Sport
- Sport: Greyhound racing

Achievements and titles
- National finals: Derby wins: English Derby (1981, 1989); Irish Derby (1969, 1973, 1987); Classic/Feature wins: Irish Cesarewitch (1963, 1967, 1975, 1987); Irish Laurels (1970, 1976, 1979, 1980, 1983, 1984, 1985, 1996); English Laurels (1990); Irish St Leger (1956, 1960, 1962, 1965, 1967, 1969, 1971, 1972, 1975, 1976, 1977, 1984); Irish National Sprint (1965, 1969); Irish Oaks (1979); Shelbourne 600 (1972, 1975, 1976); Produce Stakes (1973, 1976); Tipperary Cup (1980, 1982, 1976); Corn Cuchulainn (1967, 1973); Easter Cup (1969)

Gerard "Ger" McKenna (1930 – 7 May 2014) was an Irish greyhound trainer regarded as the greatest Irish trainer of all time. He won the Irish Greyhound Derby three times and the English Greyhound Derby twice. From 1956 until 1996 he won 45 major competitions.

== Early life ==
He was born in Borrisokane, County Tipperary, his father was Malachy McKenna (a cattle trader), and mother was Agnes McKenna (née Gavin), and he was the younger cousin of Gay McKenna. His father introduced him to greyhound racing and was a successful trainer in his own right winning the 1956 Irish Greyhound Derby with Keep Moving.

== Career ==
His first major success came in 1956 with his favourite greyhound Prince of Bermuda who won the Irish St Leger. McKenna would experience major success at regular intervals over the following years. Major race wins became second nature and records tumbled. His greyhound Yanka Boy won the 1967 greyhound of the year.

In 1969 Ger won the Irish Greyhound Derby for the first time with Own Pride and four years later in 1973 he claimed a second Irish Derby title and arguably became the most prominent trainer in Irish racing at the time. It was around this time that he started sending strong teams to compete in the English Greyhound Derby and Ballymaclune provided his first finalist in that event in 1975 and one year later in 1976 he trained the runner up.

Irish Derby finals became regular occurrences and then in 1981 Parkdown Jet won the 1981 English Greyhound Derby for McKenna, this was only the second time anybody had trained both and Irish and English winner (The first was Paddy Keane).

After a second English Derby success in 1989 with Lartigue Note, he became the first person to achieve more than one Irish and English Derby win. Included in his 45 major competition wins are twelve Irish St Legers and eight Irish Laurels.

McKenna retired in 1999 transferring the racing operation to one of his sons Owen McKenna who won the Irish Derby himself in 2004.

== Death ==
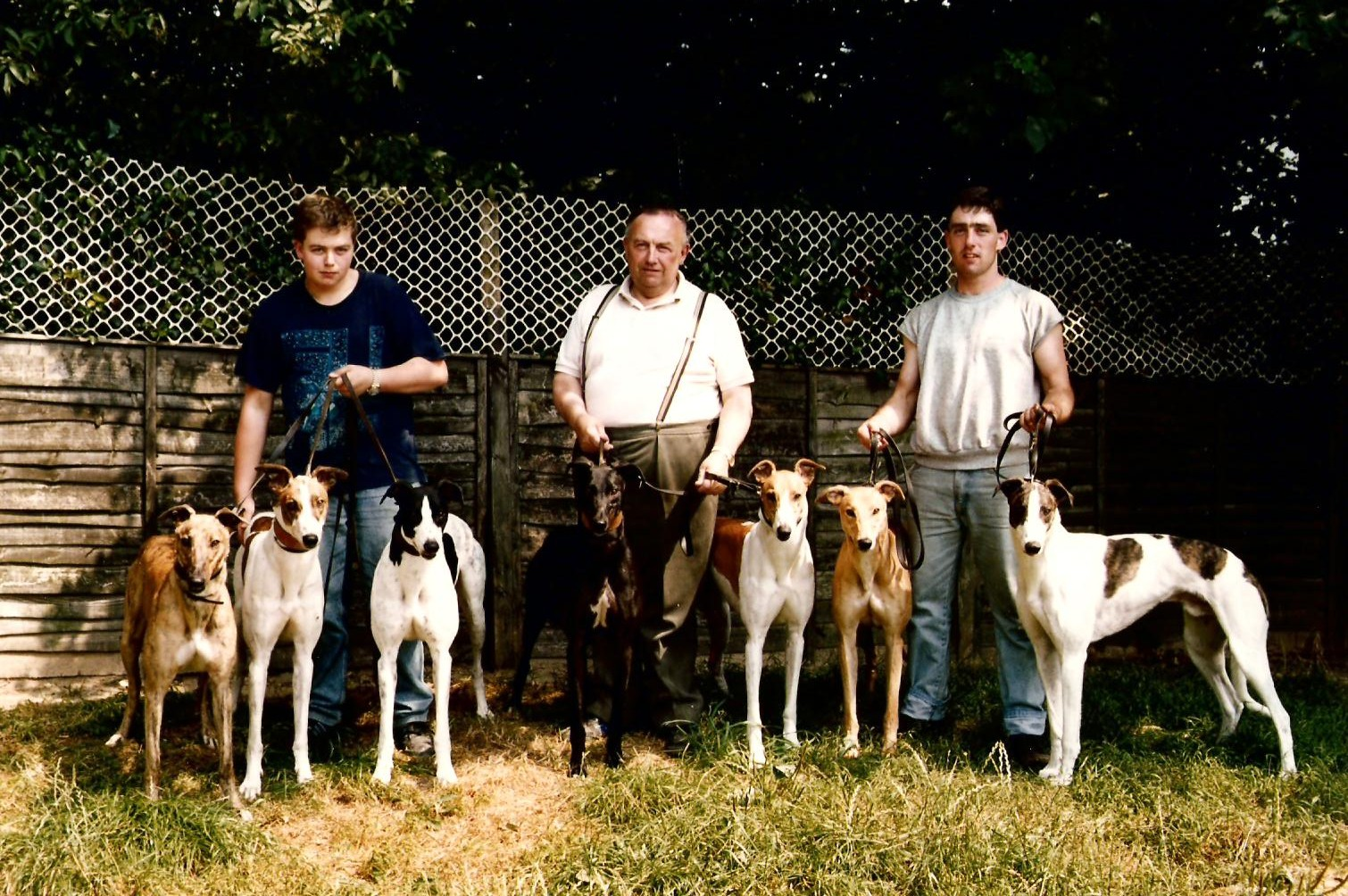
Left to right – Owen McKenna, Ger McKenna and Ger McKenna Jr.

McKenna died in May 2014 leaving a wife Josie and three sons Ger, John and Owen. His legacy is that he is regarded as one of the leading Irish trainers of all-time.
