= Shelbourne Park =

Greyhound racing venue in Dublin, Ireland

- Interactive map of Shelbourne Park
- Location: Ringsend, Dublin
- Coordinates: 53.340378°N 6.230236°W
- Operated by: Greyhound Racing Ireland
- Date opened: 1927
- Capacity: 800
- Race type: Greyhound
- Notable races: Irish Greyhound Derby

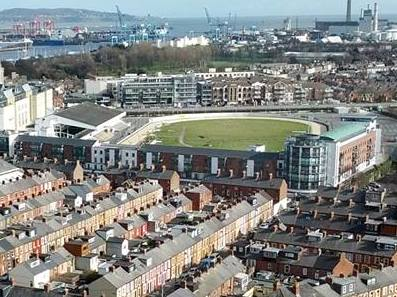
View of Ringsend showing Shelbourne Park

Shelbourne Park is a greyhound racing stadium in the south Dublin inner city suburb of Ringsend.

== Greyhound racing ==
=== Opening ===
The plans to open a greyhound track in Dublin were drawn up by Paddy O’Donoghue, Jerry Collins, Patsy McAlinden and Jim Clarke. Shelbourne Park opened on 14 May 1927 hot on the heels of Celtic Park (Belfast). The stadium located in the docklands in Ringsend was Dublin's answer to the Belfast track and the pair became the two most prestigious greyhound tracks in Irish racing. When opening in 1927 the track employed four resident trainers in Mick Horan, Paddy Quigley, Billy Donoghue and Ben Scally.

=== History ===
One year later it was decided to introduce the Easter Cup which commemorated the 1916 Easter Monday Rising in Dublin. However, the race soon became known for its own fame rather than its naming origins. The first winner was a greyhound called Odd Blade and the brindle dog went on to successfully defend his title the following year. Famously Mick the Miller equalled the world record time for 500 yards when recording 28.80 in 1928 but he only managed a runner-up spot to Odd Blade in that previously mentioned 1929 Easter Cup final. Mick went on to win the English Greyhound Derby that year for Shelbourne trainer Horan.

Shelbourne Park hosted the first official Irish Greyhound Derby which had been run on four previous occasions from 1928 to 1931 at a rival track Harold's Cross Stadium. The first winner of the Irish Derby at Shelbourne was Guideless Joe owned by champion Irish jockey Jack Moyland and trained by local trainer Mick Horan.

The Oaks came to Shelbourne Park in 1935 and like the Irish Derby, was normally run every other year with Harolds Cross hosting in between. The Grand National took place here in 1933 & 1934 and the St Leger four times in the thirties but it was decided by the Irish Coursing Club that it was better to distribute the classics between several tracks. Another event was inaugurated in 1939 and that was the McAlinden Cup.

The remarkable greyhound called Tanist reached the final of the Easter Cup in April 1940, by smashing the track record at Shelbourne Park in 29.66sec and the legendary Spanish Battleship claimed his second of three Derby victories in 1954, also breaking the track record in the process. On 25 June 1946 Shelbourne used the first photo finish in Ireland during the semi-finals of the McAlinden Cup.

An extraordinary 1956 Irish Derby saw 'Keep Moving' break the track record twice before the sub-29-second barrier was broken by Prince of Bermuda.

Bord na gCon installed a new totalisator system in 1960 and eight years later they purchased the stadium itself to stop the threat of redevelopment that was hanging over the stadium. A £240,000 investment followed and the same year that the Irish Derby found a permanent home at Shelbourne to the dismay of Harolds Cross supporters. The Shelbourne 600 sponsored by Guinness started in 1964 and the Oaks also became permanent at Shelbourne in 1980.

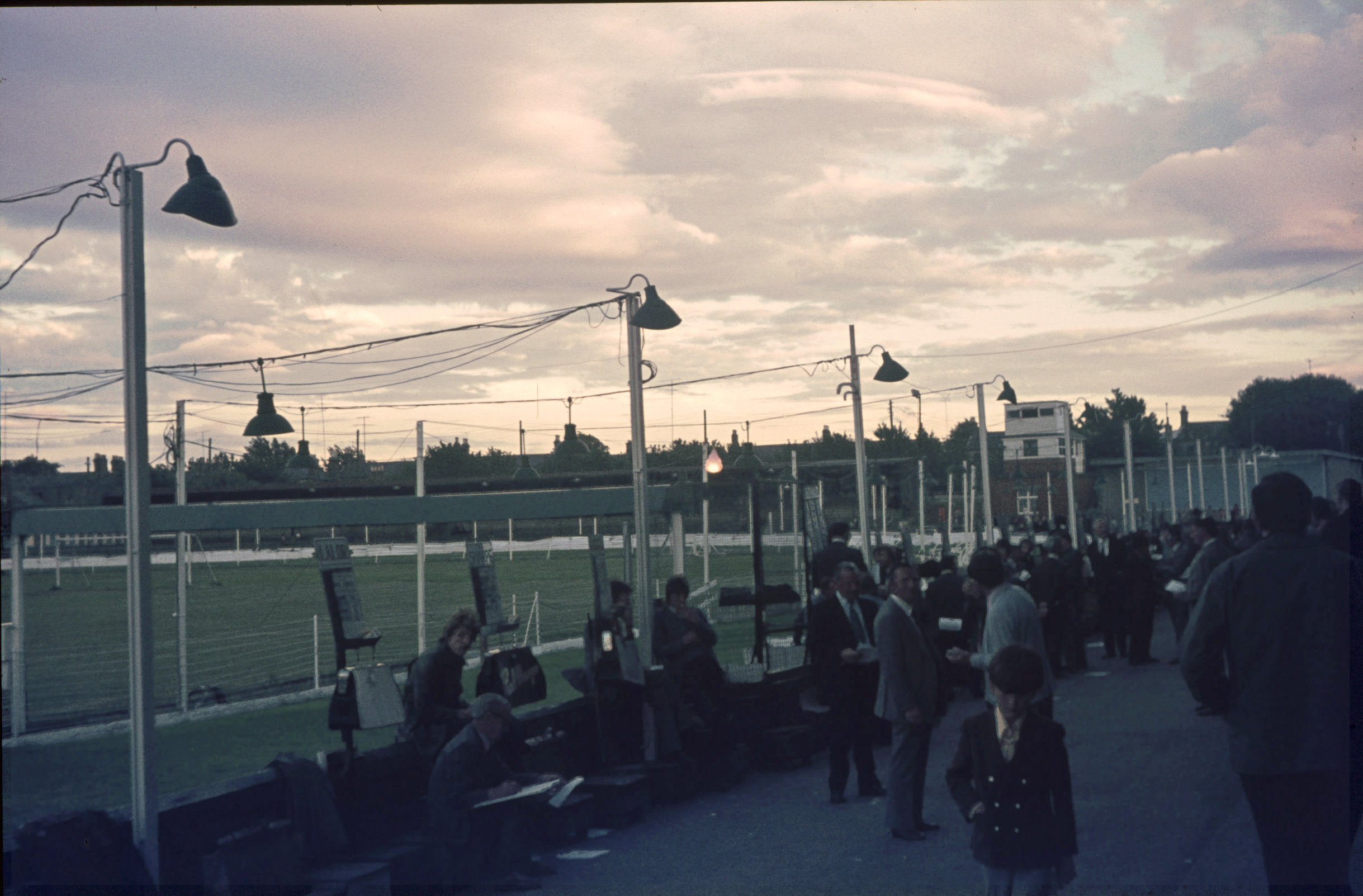
The bookmakers in 1974

Paddy Ryan who became the Racing Manager in 1974 after taking over the reins from Jack O'Shea would hold the position for over 30 years before becoming general manager and then retiring in 2009. The Derby distance changed to 550 yards in 1986 and after a successful one-off feature in 1979, the Champion Stakes became an annual event in 1986.

With the closure of Celtic Park in 1983 Shelbourne became the premier track in Ireland and continues to provide most of the major events in the Irish racing calendar. In March 2021, the Board of Rásaíocht Con Éireann (Greyhound Racing Ireland) announced a two-stage €2.3 million plan for improvements at the venue.

In a 2009 episode of the British motoring programme Top Gear, Richard Hammond raced a Mazda MX5 against a greyhound around the track at Shelbourne Park.

The 2024 Irish Greyhound Derby was moved from its traditional Summer slot due to a major refurbishment of Shelbourne Park.

== Competitions ==
- Irish Greyhound Derby
- Champion Stakes
- Easter Cup
- Grand National
- Juvenile Derby
- McAlinden Cup
- Oaks
- Shelbourne Gold Cup
- Shelbourne 600
- St Leger

== Current track records ==
Yards	Greyhound	Time (sec)	Date	Notes/Ref
350	Gizmo Cash	18.18	13 May 2022	
525	Droopys Kathleen	27.58	9 November 2024	
550	Bockos Diamond	28.94	2 November 2024	Irish Derby 3rd round
550	Bockos Diamond	=28.94	16 November 2024	Irish Derby semi-final
575	Sentimental Lad	30.59	9 July 2022	
600	Laughil Duke	31.91	26 September 2015	
750	Redzer Ardfert	40.86	21 September 2019	
850	Dana Point	47.05	9 October 2021	
1025	Riverside Honey	58.11	6 December 2019	
525 hurdles	Secondrate Champ	28.73	16 April 2005	

== Former track records ==
Yards	Greyhound	Time (sec)	Date	Notes/Ref
350	Cool Performance	18.42	9 June 2001	
350	Sycamore Dan	18.41	18 September 2004	
350	Ardnasool Jet	18.38	10 May 2019	
350	Ardnasool Jet	18.33	24 May 2019	
360	Counts Cure	20.10	1941	
360	Kilbelin Battleship	19.80	24 June 1957	
360	Portumna Wonder	19.80	10 October 1970	
360	Toms Pal	19.50	23 September 1972	
360	Lauragh Six	19.33	20 August 1983	
360	And Again	19.26	1988	
360	Meet Me Halfway	19.19	18 August 1990	
360	Upper Spark	19.05	25 May 1996	
500	Mick The Miller	28.80	9 May 1928	Equalled world record time
525	Loughadian	30.00	1929	
525	Mick The Miller	30.00	17 June 1929	National Cup Second Round
525	Lions Share	30.17	1931	
525	Little Chummie	30.16	18 July 1931	National Cup Second Round
525	Queen of the Rock	29.87	May 1932	
525	Talis	29.80	16 July 1938	
525	Tanist	29.66	April 1940	Easter Cup heats
525	Smartly Fergus	29.60	25 June 1945	
525	Imperial Dancer	29.55	July 1950	Irish Derby first round
525	Spanish Battleship	29.50	July 1954	Irish Derby first round
525	Spanish Battleship	29.50	July 1954	Irish Derby semi-finals
525	Keep Moving	29.49	July 1956	
525	Keep Moving	29.40	21 July 1956	Irish Derby first round
525	Prince of Bermuda	28.98	21 July 1956	1956 Irish Greyhound Derby first round
525	Yellow Printer	28.83	20 July 1968	Irish Derby first round
525	Ballykilty	28.80	August 1972	
525	Tantallons Gift	28.73	31 July 1976	1976 Irish Greyhound Derby first round
525	Cool Panther	28.72	5 July 1997	
525	Kilmessan Jet	28.43	March 1999	
525	Chart King	28.40	3 April 1999	Easter Cup Final
525	Priceless Rebel	28.27	27 October 2001	
525	Premier Fantasy	28.08	10 April 2004	Easter Cup Final
525	Milldean Panther	28.00	29 October 2011	
525	Paradise Madison	27.92	17 November 2012	
525	Paradise Madison	27.67	8 December 2012	
550	Buzzing Dick	31.66	7 October 1934	
550	Chicken Sandwich	31.59	13 October 1934	St Leger Final
550	Negros Equal	31.29	3 October 1936	
550	Ballydancer	31.25	30 September 1939	
550	Westpark Quail	30.74	1965	
550	Own Pride	30.60	December 1969	Shelbourne Leger second round
550	Ivy Hall Flash	30.37	1 November 1971	
550	Tommy Astaire	30.35	14 September 1975	
550	Jerpoint Paris	30.35	8 November 1976	
550	Wise Band	30.23	1988	
550	Lodge Prince	30.03	9 August 1986	From the 525 traps
550	Trade Official	29.99	24 July 1995	Champion Stakes semi-finals
550	Dew Reward	29.97	16 September 1995	
550	Eyeman	29.97	20 August 1998	Irish Derby qualifying round
550	Eyeman	29.92	9 September 1998	Irish Derby quarter-finals
550	Santa Paolo	29.92	24 July 1999	Champion Stakes semi-finals
550	Frisby Flashing	29.89	30 December 1999	Magnificent 200 Millennium Club
550	Greenfield Deal	29.74	26 August 2000	Irish Derby quarter-finals
550	Judicial Pride	29.66	26 August 2000	Irish Derby semi-finals
550	Droopys Vieri	29.57	25 August 2001	Irish Derby second round
550	Cool Performance	29.57	25 August 2001	Irish Derby second round
550	Bypass Byway	29.42	14 September 2002	Irish Derby Final
550	College Causeway	29.21	5 August 2009	
550	Tyrur Van Gaal	29.10	27 August 2015	
550	Pestana	28.99	22 August 2020	Irish Derby 2nd round
575	Damthelie	32.09	7 November 1977	
575	Greenhill Paddy	32.04	29 July 1978	
575	Hume Highway	31.97	1979	
575	Lax Law	31.79	1979	
575	Noisy Party	31.74	20 September 1986	
575	Alans Judy	31.74	1990	
575	Fly Cruiser	31.61	16 September 1990	
575	Popov	31.58	15 October 1994	
575	Concorde Direct	31.09	2 September 2000	
575	Mr Jay Jay	31.34	25 August 2001	
575	Peter Optimist	31.32	14 September 2002	
575	Smiling Man	31.13	10 April 2004	
575	Ronans Delight	31.09	25 September 2004	
575	Ronans Delight	31.04	16 October 2004	
575	Broadacres Turbo	30.89	13 September 2008	
575	Airport Pilot	30.89	3 October 2009	
575	Mall Brandy	30.88	13 September 2013	
575	Greenwell Hulk	30.85	7 June 2014	
575	Milldean Puma	30.65	30 April 2016	
600	Son of the Road	34.95	March 1935	
600	Baytown Ivy	34.40	27 October 1945	
600	Galloping Home	33.95	1950	
600	Cranog Bet	33.60	1964	
600	Vals Prince	33.53	August 1965	
600	Westpark Quail	33.49	August 1965	
600	Lazy Tim	33.07	24 August 1966	
600	Fly Cruiser	33.00	May 1991	
600	Deerfield Pier	32.99	May 1994	Shelbourne 600 heats
600	Cool Panther	32.94	18.04.1998	Shelbourne 600 heats
600	Kilmessan Jet	32.72	March 1999	
600	Kilmessan Jet	32.58	24 April 1999	
600	Joannestown Cash	32.49	6 May 2000	Shelbourne 600 final
600	Late Late Show	32.29	17 May 2001	
600	Late Late Show	32.20	09.06.2001	Shelbourne 600 final
600	Sparta Maestro	32.10	8 September 2012	
750	Rita's Choice		July 1973	Irish TV Trophy
750	Waverly Supreme	42.39	6 July 1974	
750	Chicita Banana	42.36	6 August 1988	
750	Rush For Silver	42.19	22 October 1990	
750	Millstream Lad	42.04	5 August 1998	
750	Get Connected	42.01	10 October 1998	
750	Making Merry	41.59	15 September 2001	
750	Longtail Rebel	41.34	10 October 2009	
750	Ceroc Shaneboy	41.34	22 October 2011	
750	Airforce Duke	41.11	28 September 2013	
750	Redzer Ardfert	41.06	26 July 2019	
850	Glenske Nijinski	48.07	14 July 2001	
850	Hulkster	47.81	30 July 2005	
850	Corporate Attack	47.11	12 September 2009	
860	Martins Ghost	49.13	27 March 2000	
1025	Ruscar Dana	59.91	6 August 1988	
1025	Let Us Know	58.86	16 March 2002	
1025	Jaytee Patriot	58.62	22 December 2017	
1025	Ballykett Beauty	58.34	22 December 2017	
525 H	Cormorant	29 sec 4.5	May 1928	
525 H	Cormorant	29 sec 4.5	2 June 1928	
525 H	Table Cut	30.98	1950	
525 H	Hillcrest Pride	30.71	30 August 1969	
525 H	Knockreigh Dawn	29.68	1 November 1975	
525 H	Sand Blinder	29.46	4 October 1986	
525 H	Kildare Slippy	29.18	3 October 1992	
525 H	Autumn Merlin	29.12	14 October 2000	
525 H	Joe Bananas	28.99	18 September 2004	
525 H	Secondrate Champ	28.73	16 April 2005	
550 H	Kyleside	32.60	1970	
600 H	Old Son	35.82	3 July 1935	

== Football ==
The stadium also played host to the home matches of Shelbourne FC, who play in the League of Ireland, from 1913/14 to 1948/49. The first match was a 1–1 draw against Bohemians and their last match there was a 2–2 draw against Waterford. Shels left Shelbourne Park with the intention of building a new stadium in the nearby district of Irishtown.

While Shelbourne Park was the home of Shelbourne FC, they won one Irish Cup while competing in the Irish League and upon becoming founder members of the League of Ireland in 1921, won five league titles and one FAI Cup before moving on.

Shelbourne Park was the venue for two FAI Cup Final replays, in 1927 and 1929.

In 1928, Shelbourne Park hosted an inter-league challenge match between the League of Ireland XI and the Irish League XI with the home side winning 3:1 in front of a crowd of 12,000.

== Speedway racing ==
Shelbourne Park staged Motorcycle speedway racing from 1950 to 1954, again in 1961 and again in 1970 and 1971. In 1951 it was a base for a team of American speedway riders including Nick Nicolaides, Don Hawley, Johnny Roccio, Manuel Trujillo, and Lloyd Campbell. The team raced at most of the UK tracks and often featured Ernie Roccio who was based at Wimbledon.
