= 1992 Irish Greyhound Derby =

1992 Respond Irish Greyhound Derby
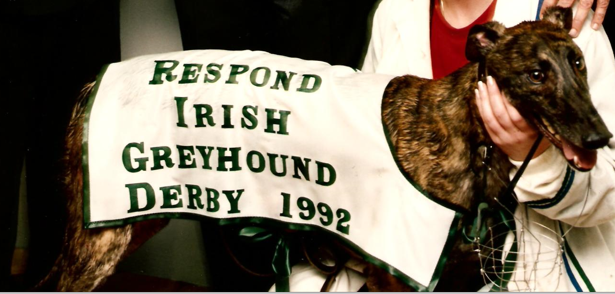
- Manx Treasure
- Venue: Shelbourne Park
- Location: Dublin
- End date: 26 September
- Total prize money: £50,000 (winner)

The 1992 Irish Greyhound Derby took place during August and September with the final being held at Shelbourne Park in Dublin on 26 September 1992.

The winner Manx Treasure won £50,000 and was trained by Michael O'Sullivan and owned and bred by John Guildford in the Isle of Man. The race was sponsored by the Kerry Group's dog food product 'Respond' who had increased the winner's prize by an extra £20,000.

== Final result ==
At Shelbourne, 26 September (over 550 yards):

Position	Winner	Breeding	Trap	SP	Time	Trainer
1st	Manx Treasure	Greenpark Fox - Minorcas Fuchsia	5	5-2	30.53	Michael O'Sullivan
2nd	Radical Prince	Lodge Prince - Garryduff Lassie	1	7-1	30.55	Eddie Wade
3rd	Farloe Melody	Lodge Prince - Chini Chin Chin	6	6-4f	30.74	Matt O'Donnell
4th	Ballymoss Clover	Summerhill Gem - Sandy Lu	3	40-1	31.00	Peadar Lambe
5th	Sliding Away	Soda Fountain - Milltown Gem	2	8-1	31.02	Michael O'Donovan
6th	Superfine Darkie	Low Sail - Lisnakill Carmel	4	7-1	31.23	Alan Black

=== Distances ===
head, 2¼, 3¼, head, 2½ (lengths)

== Competition Report ==
Manx Treasure, a brindle dog, had a toe amputated in January 1992 before he had even competed in a single race. When he made his comeback in June he progressed well before suffering a stress fracture on his hock curtailing his recovery. With the Respond Irish Derby fast approaching the dog recovered well and took his place in the qualifying round.

In the first round Manx Treasure was bumped running from a bad draw and finished last but four days later he won by ten lengths in 30.67 in the repechage round. He followed this up with a five length victory in round one recording 30.43. The 1992 English Greyhound Derby champion and double Easter Cup champion Farloe Melody remained hot favourite despite a qualifying round defeat. He then eased to two victories in the first two rounds. Other notable performances in the earlier rounds included Polnoon Chief and Market Rascal.

The quick runs for Manx Treasure were proving difficult for his connections to manage the stress on the hock and he required veterinary attention after each run to ensure that he was fully fit to compete. A second round win in 30.65 put him into the quarter-finals. In the quarter-finals Manx Treasure suffered a short head defeat to Superfine Darkie while the other heats went to Market Rascal, Polnoon Chief and a dead-heat between Parquet Pet and Ballymoss Clover.

Manx Treasure produced a fast run to win by five lengths in 30.23 from Radical Prince and Ballymoss Clover in the semi-finals, the fastest in the competition so far. The second semi was taken by Sliding Away ahead off Superfine Darkie and the hampered Farloe Melody.

In just his eleventh career race on 26 September Manx Treasure was first out of the traps and saw off the challenge of Farloe Melody at the third bend and then held off a late finish from Radical Prince. Farloe Melody were retired to stud after the race.

== See also ==
- 1992 UK & Ireland Greyhound Racing Year
