= Farloe Melody =

Racing Greyhound

- Sire: Lodge Prince
- Dam: Chini Chin Chin
- Sex: Dog
- Whelped: 28 August 1989
- Color: Blue and brindle
- Breeder: James Moore
- Owner: John Davis & Dave Tickner
- Trainer: Matt O'Donnell

Record
- English Greyhound Derby (1992); Easter Cup (1991, 1992); Dundalk International (1991, 1992)

Awards
- Derby champion

Other awards
- Irish Greyhound of the Year

Farloe Melody was a racing greyhound during the 1990s. He won the 1992 English Greyhound Derby and was the 1992 Greyhound of the Year and twice Irish Greyhound Derby finalist.

== Racing career ==
=== 1991 ===
Farloe Melody came to prominence in 1991 after winning the Easter Cup at Shelbourne Park, Dundalk International at Dundalk Ramparts Greyhound Stadium, finishing runner-up to kennelmate Ardfert Mick by a neck in the Champion Stakes final and reaching final of the Irish Laurels. He had been purchased by John Davis and Dave Tickner during the Easter Cup competition.

He was part of a large team that trainer Matt O'Donnell entered for the 1991 Respond Irish Greyhound Derby at Shelbourne. After impressing throughout the competition and winning quarter final and semi final (both containing Ardfert Mick) he merited being 6-4 favourite for the final but made a hash of the break from the traps and finished in fifth place behind Ardfert Mick. He ended his 1991 season by finishing runner-up to Castleland Dream in the Irish St Leger final.

=== 1992 ===
He started his 1992 campaign by successfully defending his Easter Cup crown and becoming only the third greyhound to do so and emulating Odd Blade and Spanish Battleship. He also became the first greyhound to break 29 seconds at Shelbourne on four separate occasions. The connections of the blue and brindle dog then decided to travel to England and compete in the 1992 English Greyhound Derby at Wimbledon Stadium. Farloe Melody steadily progressed through the rounds and by the semi-finals was still one of the favourites to claim the title. However controversy followed when Farloe Meldoy passed the line first at 7-4f followed home by Siostalaoir and Pennys Best with Murlens Abbey and Ringa Hustle encountering trouble and the connections of Murlens Abbey squarely blaming the seeding of Ringa Hustle as the reason that they both got knocked out. In the final Farloe Melody finally drew his favoured trap six box for the first time and it resulted in an easy four length victory from Winsor Abbey who after a poor start ran on very strongly. His Irish supporters were ecstatic as he took a clear lead from Siostalaoir at the third bend.

Back in Ireland he became the first greyhound to successfully defend a Dundalk International title before he targeted the Irish Derby once again. Farloe Melody remained hot favourite for the 1992 Irish Greyhound Derby despite a qualifying round defeat; he then eased to two victories in the next two rounds. The second semi was taken by Sliding Away ahead off Superfine Darkie with the hampered Farloe Melody claiming third place and deservedly earning the remaining place in the final. On an extremely wet night Manx Treasure bolted from the traps and saw off the challenge of Farloe Melody at the third bend and then held off a late finish from Radical Prince. After the race Farloe Melody was retired to stud.

He was voted 1992 Irish Greyhound of the Year.

=== 1993 ===
Farloe Melody was brought out of retirement for a third attempt to win the elusive Irish Greyhound Derby; the bookmakers priced him up as 14-1 joint ante post favourite with Lisglass Lass. Farloe Melody won his qualifying round before a shock round two defeat and Farloe Melody was eliminated. He just failed to complete three Dundalk International wins when finishing second to Lisglass Lass in a track record time.

== Retirement ==
After racing he was sent to Australia where he was put to stud.

== Pedigree ==
Friend Westy
Sand Man
Miss Gorgeous
Lodge Prince
Top Customer
Cooga Customer
Cooga First
Farloe Melody
The Stranger
Tico
Derry Linda
Chini Chin Chin
Allemaine
Burr Tulip
Lady Barbra
