= Dundalk International =

Irish greyhound racing competition

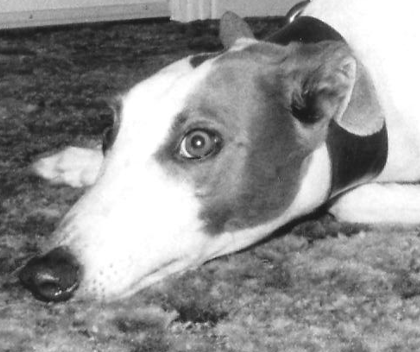
- Mollifrend Lucky, 1986 winner
- Class: Feature
- Location: Dundalk Stadium
- Inaugurated: 1968
- Sponsor: Time

Race information
- Distance: 550 yards
- Surface: Sand
- Qualification: Invitation only
- Purse: €20,000 (winner)

The Dundalk International is a greyhound racing competition held annually at Dundalk Stadium in Dundalk, County Louth, Ireland.

It was held at the Dundalk Ramparts Greyhound Stadium from 1968 until 2000 until the track closed in 2000 and then it returned in 2004 after the new track was built.

It is a prestigious event and is invitation only, attracting some of Ireland's leading greyhounds and occasionally some of the Britain's leading greyhounds. The event is one of the richest one-off races in Ireland (€20,000 in 2022) and is an integral part of the Irish greyhound racing calendar after being inaugurated in 1968. At one time it had been the richest prize for one of race in both the United Kingdom and Ireland.

== Venues & distances ==
- 1968–1999 (Dundalk Ramparts Stadium 525y)
- 2004–present (Dundalk Stadium 550y)

== Sponsors ==
- 1968–1989 (Carrolls)
- 1991–1991 (Bernard Barry)
- 1992–1999 (Bar One Racing)
- 2004–2013 (Boylesports)
- 2014–2014 (Matthews Coaches Hire)
- 2017–2017 (Racing Post)
- 2015–2016, 2018 (Marshes Shopping Centre)
- 2019–2019 (EOS IT Solutions)
- 2023–2025 (Time)

== Past winners ==
Year	Winner	Breeding	Time	Trainer	SP	Notes/ref
1968	Not Flashing	Prairie Flash – Not Landing	29.80	Frank Cavlan		
1969	Sirius	Shanes Legacy – Jersey Queen	29.62	George Curtis (UK)	5/1	
1970	Jemmy John	Prairie Flash – Fawn Deer	30.35	Eddie Jones		
1971	Ivy Hall Flash	Proud Lincoln – Ivy Hall Rose	29.62	Paddy Keane		
1972	Time Up Please	Newdown Heather – Dogstown Fame	29.60	Ger McKenna		
1973	Bashful Man	Myross Again – Ballyflake	29.70	Ger McKenna		
1974	Nelson Blast	Nelson Pillar – Yanka Seasons	30.30	Mick Broughal	6/1	
1975	Our Main Avenue	Kilbelin Star – Speckled Fawn	29.73	Dave Kinchett (UK)		
1976	Mutts Silver	The Grand Silver – Simple Pride	29.80	Phil Rees Sr. (UK)		
1977	Brush Tim	Supreme Fun – Gormanstown Aye	29.72	Francie Murray		
1978	Hunday Dook	Hunday Champion – Shes Knocking	29.76	Francie Murray		
1979	Nameless Pixie	Monalee Champion – Itsastar	29.82	Ger McKenna		
1980	Jelly Crock	Lindas Champion – Mosey Ada	29.80	Matt Travers		
1981	Cooladine Super	Tranquility Sea – Cooladine Super	29.72	Colm McGrath	9/4jf	
1982	Summerhill Flash	Mulcair Rocket – Lady Hester	29.46	Michael Enright	5/1	
1983	Quick Suzy	Shamrock Sailor – Big Deposit	29.94	Colm McGrath		
1984	Rugged Mick	Ceili Band – Blueberry Pet	29.34	Ger McKenna		
1985	Shanagarry Duke	Its Ballyhenry – Glenduff Castle	29.74	Mick Boyce	3/1	
1986	Mollifrend Lucky	Lauries Panther – Top Princess	29.60	Colin Packham (UK)		
1987	Rapid Mover	Sand Man – Rapid Lady	29.54	Fred Wiseman (UK)	6/1	
1988	Hit The Lid	Soda Fountain – Cailin Dubh	29.28	John McGee Sr. (UK)		
1989	Fair Hill Boy	Tico – Echo Duchess	29.38	Davy Lennon	5/2	
1990	Adraville Bridge	I'm Slippy – Milltown Gem	29.52	Mossy O'Connor	11/8f	
1991	Farloe Melody	Lodge Prince – Chini Chin Chin	29.74	Matt O'Donnell		
1992	Farloe Melody	Lodge Prince – Chini Chin Chin	29.36	Matt O'Donnell	4/7f	
1993	Lisglass Lass	Quare Rocket – Machern	29.18	Francie Murray		Track record
1994	Ayr Flyer	Ardfert Sean – Slaneyside Glory	29.46	Patsy Byrne (UK)		
1995	Westmead Merlin	Murlens Slippy – Westmead Hannah	29.50	Nick Savva (UK)		
1996	Dynamic Fair	Fair Boot – Seventh Dynamic	29.14	Patsy Byrne (UK)	16/1	=track record
1997	Dynamic Fair	Fair Boot – Seventh Dynamic	29.48	Patsy Byrne (UK)	9/1	
1998	Sineads Rocket	Fifthofnovember – Lady Arrancourt	29.20	Frances O'Donnell	6/4f	
1999	Borna Survivor	Staplers Jo – Cool Survivor	29.30	Ruairi Dwan	4/6f	
2000–2003 Not held due to closure of the Ramparts stadium
2004	Tomsheaboy	Rio Riccardo – Ballymac Pepes	29.94	Patsy Byrne	4/1	
2005	Droopys Maldini	Droopys Kewell – Little Diamond UK	30.02	Fraser Black	6/4f	
2006	Droopys Electric	Droopys Agassi – Droopys Jolie	29.73	Pat Buckley	9/4cf	Track record
2007	Si Senor	Droopys Kewell – Droopys Beauty	29.47	Owen McKenna	5/4f	
2008	Blonde Dino	Daves Mentor – Charquest	29.76	John Mullins	6/1	
2009	Skywalker Queen	Razldazl Billy – Nifty Princess	30.04	Frances O'Donnell	7/2	
2010	Definate Opinion	Surf Lorian – Josiva	29.80	Patrick Guilfoyle	4/1	
2011	Definate Opinion	Surf Lorian – Josiva	29.76	Patrick Guilfoyle	3/1	
2012	Quail Hollow	Royal Impact – Girl With Guitar	29.76	Francis Murray	4/1	
2013	Priceless Sky	Royal Impact – Priceless Pearl	30.16	Paul Hennessy	5/2	
2014	Metro Jack	Head Bound – Blasket Music	30.11	Peter Cronin	10/1	
2015	Paradise Silva	Hondo Black – Dalcash Diva	29.73	Pat Buckley	4/1	
2016	Droopys Roddick	Droopys Jet – Droopys Start	29.40	Pat Buckley	9/4	Track record
2017	Jaytee Jet	Droopys Scolari – Chin Gach Gook	30.01	Paul Hennessy	3/1	
2018	Droopys Verve	Loughteen Blanco – Droopys Cyclone	29.39	Angela Harrison (UK)	1/1f	Track record
2019	Killmacdonagh	Zero Ten – Deercrest Lady	29.42	Kieran Lynch	5/2	
2020 & 2021 Not held due to (COVID-19 pandemic)
2022	Explosive Boy	Good News – Delightful Girl	29.68	Patrick Guilfoyle	n/a	
2023	Raha Mofo	Droopys Sydney – Clares Queen	29.98	Murt Leahy	4/1	
2024	Droopys Mandolin	Laughil Blake – Droopys Curio	29.72	Robert G. Gleeson	n/a	
2025	Cheap Sandwiches	Burgess Bucks – Hearthill Josie	30.06	Graham Holland	n/a	
