= Bitch of the Year =

Bitch of the Year may refer to:

- Bitch of the Year, Irish Greyhound of the Year Awards
- "Bitch of the Year", song by Krewella
