= 1991 English Greyhound Derby =

UK greyhound race

- Location: Wimbledon Stadium
- End date: 22 June
- Total prize money: £40,000 (winner)

The 1991 Daily Mirror/Sporting Life Greyhound Derby took place during May & June with the final being held on 22 June 1991 at Wimbledon Stadium. The winner Ballinderry Ash received £40,000. The competition was sponsored by the Sporting Life and Daily Mirror.

== Final result ==
At Wimbledon (over 480 metres):

Position	Name of Greyhound	Breeding	Trap	SP	Time	Trainer
1st	Ballinderry Ash	Kyle Jack - Ballinderry Sand	5	5-1	28.78	Patsy Byrne (Wimbledon)
2nd	Itsallovernow	Glen Park Dancer - Just a Spark	6	5-1	28.90	Ger McKenna (Ireland)
3rd	Dempsey Duke	Shanagarry Duke - Willowbrook Peg	1	6-1	28.94	Terry Kibble (Bristol)
4th	Fearless Mustang	Nippy Law - Fearless Star	3	1-1f	29.18	Geoff De Mulder (Perry Barr)
5th	Summerhill Super	Daleys Gold - Tiny Tolcas	4	6-1	29.19	John Copplestone (Portsmouth)
6th	Dunmurry Brandy	Randy - Yellow Swan	2	14-1	29.27	Fred Sibley (Private)

=== Distances ===
1½, ½, 3, short head, 1 (lengths)
The distances between the greyhounds are in finishing order and shown in lengths. One length is equal to 0.08 of one second.

== Competition Report ==
Scottish Greyhound Derby champion Phantom Flash led the ante-post betting (from 193 entries) going into the 1991 Derby . Other leading contenders included Fires of War and Fearless Mustang and the Irish runners included Laurels winner Concentration, Ballyoughter Lad and Itsallovernow (all Ger McKenna) in addition to the Irish Greyhound Derby champion The Other Toss (Matt O'Donnell). Concentration is subject to a gamble and is backed to 12-1 favourite before the competition starts.

In the qualifying round Ballyoughter Lad went fastest winning in 28.61, Phantom Flash and Concentration both won at odds of 1-6 and 1-10. In the first round Geoff DeMulder's Fearless Mustang recorded 28.39 and Phantom Flash won by 7½ lengths returning at 1-12f. With the field down to 48 for the second round there two shocks when Ballyoughter Lad went out despite being priced at 1-3f and Concentration was eliminated when he turned in the traps. Phantom Flash continued his good ways defeating The Other Toss.

The consistent Dempsey Duke claimed the first quarter-final and remained unbeaten with four straight but this was overshadowed when Phantom Flash found trouble in the same heat and failed to qualify finishing fifth. Summerhill Super won the second quarter at 8-1 with The Other Toss just qualifying in third and Fires of War being eliminated. Fearless Mustang remained unbeaten after winning heat three from Itsallovernow and Ballinderry Ash took the last heat from Slippys Quest.

With Phantom Flash out Fearless Mustang and The Other Toss were the new favourites for the title. Fearless Mustang duly completed a 28.88 victory in the first semi-final with Summerhill Super and Itsallovernow taking the minor places, the unlucky Manorland was a non-runner. The second semi provided a shock when Dunmurry Brandy beat Ballinderry Ash at odds of 20-1 with Dempsey Duke gaining the vital final place. Slippys Quest finished fourth and The Other Toss fifth.

In the final Ballinderry Ash was to provide host track Wimbledon with its second winner since the race moved there in 1985. Fearless Mustang had progressed to the final unbeaten, having posted a fastest-of-the-competition 28.39sec in the second round and was sent off hot favourite. In a competitive race the Helen Roche owned Ballinderry Ash came home first from Itsallovernow in second place.

== Quarter finals ==
Heat 1 (Jun 11)
Pos	Name	SP	Time
1st	Dempsey Duke	12-1	28.89
2nd	Manorland	4-1	28.90
3rd	Vics Snowdrop	7-1	28.92
4th	Dereen Prince	10-1	28.96
5th	Phantom Flash	4-6f	29.10
6th	Beautiful Socks	25-1	29.20

Heat 2 (Jun 11)
Pos	Name	SP	Time
1st	Summerhill Super	8-1	28.57
2nd	Satharn Lady	11-4	28.75
3rd	The Other Toss	6-4f	28.77
4th	Fires of War	5-1	28.95
5th	Supporting Cast	8-1	29.13
6th	Sail Over	12-1	29.19

Heat 3 (Jun 11)
Pos	Name	SP	Time
1st	Fearless Mustang	1-1f	28.68
2nd	Itsallovernow	4-1	29.02
3rd	Marcus McGee	11-2	29.54
4th	Crown Lodge	8-1	29.76
5th	Open Speed	6-1	29.90
6th	Teejays Son	33-1	29.96

Heat 4 (Jun 11)
Pos	Name	SP	Time
1st	Ballinderry Ash	6-4f	28.88
2nd	Slippys Quest	5-2	28.91
3rd	Dunmurry Brandy	12-1	28.95
4th	Wuncross Double	11-4	29.25
5th	Ballymadoe Ben	33-1	29.41
6th	Cover Drive	12-1	29.51

== Semi finals ==
First Semi Final (Jun 15)
Pos	Name of Greyhound	SP	Time	Trainer
1st	Fearless Mustang	4-6f	28.88	De Mulder
2nd	Summerhill Super	4-1	29.10	Copplestone
3rd	Itsallovernow	6-1	29.24	McKenna
4th	Vics Snowdrop	12-1	29.44	Rees
5th	Satharn Lady	6-1	29.50	Coleman
N/R	Manorland			Irving

Second Semi Final (Jun 15)
Pos	Name of Greyhound	SP	Time	Trainer
1st	Dunmurry Brandy	20-1	29.00	Sibley
2nd	Ballinderry Ash	5-1	29.03	Byrne
3rd	Dempsey Duke	6-1	29.06	Kibble
4th	Slippys Quest	5-2	29.22	O'Donnell
5th	The Other Toss	6-4f	29.23	O'Donnell
6th	Marcus McGee	7-1	29.33	McGee Sr.

== See also ==
- 1991 UK & Ireland Greyhound Racing Year
