= 1992 English Greyhound Derby =

- Location: Wimbledon Stadium
- Start date: 28 May
- End date: 27 June

The 1992 Daily Mirror/Sporting Life Greyhound Derby took place during May and June with the final being held on 27 June 1992 at Wimbledon Stadium. The winner Farloe Melody received £40,000. The competition was sponsored by the Sporting Life and Daily Mirror.

== Final result ==
At Wimbledon (over 480 metres):

Position	Name of Greyhound	Breeding	Trap	SP	Time	Trainer
1st	Farloe Melody	Lodge Prince - Chini Chin Chin	6	6-4f	28.88	Matt O'Donnell (Ireland)
2nd	Winsor Abbey	Waltham Abbey - Miss Fussy	4	7-1	29.18	John McGee Sr. (Private)
3rd	Siostalaoir	Paddy's Dog - Fane Opal	5	6-1	29.20	Ger McKenna (Ireland)
4th	Pennys Best	Im Slippy - Synone Crest	3	33-1	29.23	Patsy Cusack (Henlow)
5th	Glengar Ranger	Carters Lad - Glengar Moss	1	7-4	29.27	Jim Fletcher (Canterbury)
6th	Gentle Warning	Glen Park Dancer - Gentle Sarah	2	6-1	29.65	Barbara Smith (Hall Green)

=== Distances ===
3¾, head, neck, ½, 4¾ (lengths)
The distances between the greyhounds are in finishing order and shown in lengths. One length is equal to 0.08 of one second.

== Competition Report ==
The ante-post favourite for the 1992 Derby were Farloe Melody the double Irish Easter Cup champion, Dundalk International winner and Irish Greyhound Derby finalist owned by John Davis and Dave Tickner. Kennelmate Ardfert Mick was missing following his injury sustained in the Scottish Greyhound Derby final. The leading British runners were Puppy Derby champion and Juvenile winner Right Move trained by Nick Savva and John Copplestone's Murlens Abbey.

During the qualifying and first round stages Parquet Pet recorded 28.79 and Murlens Abbey was just behind with a 28.82 win. Ringa Hustle, Sullane Castle, Gortmore Express and Dempsey Duke all claimed wins but Frost Hill was eliminated. In the second round Glengar Ranger and Ballyard Ryan both won in 28.60 and Luxury Light recorded 28.70 but Right Move was knocked over and Pall Mall Stakes champion Deanpark Atom was withdrawn. Frozen Problem and Dempsey Duke were two more high-profile eliminations.

Dromin Fox won the first quarter-final followed by Murlens Abbey, Glengar Ranger and Ringa Hustle. Ballyard Ryan and Sullane Castle both failed to make the semi-finals. The semi-finals provided controversy in heat two when Farloe Melody passed the line first at 7-4f followed home by Siostalaoir and Pennys Best. Behind these Murlens Abbey and Ringa Hustle had encountered trouble with the connections of Murlens Abbey publicly criticising the rails seeding of Ringa Hustle as the reason that both greyhounds had been knocked out. Winsor Abbey claimed the earlier semi from Glengar Ranger and Gentle Warning.

In the final Farloe Melody drew his favoured trap six box for the first time and it resulted in an easy four length victory from Winsor Abbey who after a poor start ran on very strongly. Farloe Melody took a clear lead from Siostalaoir at the third bend after they were neck and neck until then. Trouble at the first bend ended the chances of Glengar Ranger and Gentle Warning.

== Quarter finals ==
Heat 1 (Jun 16)
Pos	Name	SP	Time
1st	Dromin Fox	5-1	28.83
2nd	Luxury Light	3-1	29.03
3rd	Winsor Abbey	4-1	29.06
4th	Apres Soleil	20-1	29.12
5th	Serene Tiger	10-1	29.16
6th	Ballyard Ryan	1-1f	29.36

Heat 2 (Jun 16)
Pos	Name	SP	Time
1st	Murlens Abbey	5-4f	28.84
2nd	Gentle Warning	9-4	28.94
3rd	Farloe Melody	2-1	29.04
4th	Barefoot King	20-1	29.18
5th	Pond Pavarotti	33-1	29.26
6th	Gortmore Express	20-1	29.52

Heat 3 (Jun 16)
Pos	Name	SP	Time
1st	Glengar Ranger	4-5f	28.51
2nd	Awbeg Ball	4-1	28.81
3rd	Handsome Henry	20-1	28.97
4th	Sullane Castle	3-1	29.03
5th	Wheres The Teddy	50-1	29.21
6th	Leaders Minstrel	6-1	29.23

Heat 4 (Jun 16)
Pos	Name	SP	Time
1st	Ringa Hustle	5-4f	28.95
2nd	Pennys Best	7-1	28.96
3rd	Siostaloir	5-2	29.04
4th	Bower Melody	10-1	29.52
5th	Exile Again	10-1	29.66
6th	Ballyard Curtis	6-1	29.67

== Semi finals ==
First Semi Final (Jun 20)
Pos	Name of Greyhound	SP	Time	Trainer
1st	Winsor Abbey	8-1	28.68	McGee Sr.
2nd	Glengar Ranger	4-5f	28.69	Fletcher
3rd	Gentle Warning	7-2	29.09	Smith
4th	Awbeg Ball	6-1	29.23	McEllistrim
5th	Handsome Henry	20-1	29.53	Silkman
6th	Luxury Light	5-1	00.00	McGee Sr.

Second Semi Final (Jun 20)
Pos	Name of Greyhound	SP	Time	Trainer
1st	Farloe Melody	7-4f	28.57	O'Donnell
2nd	Siostaloir	7-1	28.79	McKenna
3rd	Pennys Best	20-1	29.03	Cusack
4th	Ringa Hustle	3-1	29.25	Meek
5th	Murlens Abbey	3-1	29.55	Copplestone
6th	Dromin Fox	7-1	29.65	McKenna

== See also ==
- 1992 UK & Ireland Greyhound Racing Year
