= St Leger (Irish greyhound race) =

Irish greyhound racing competition

Irish St Leger
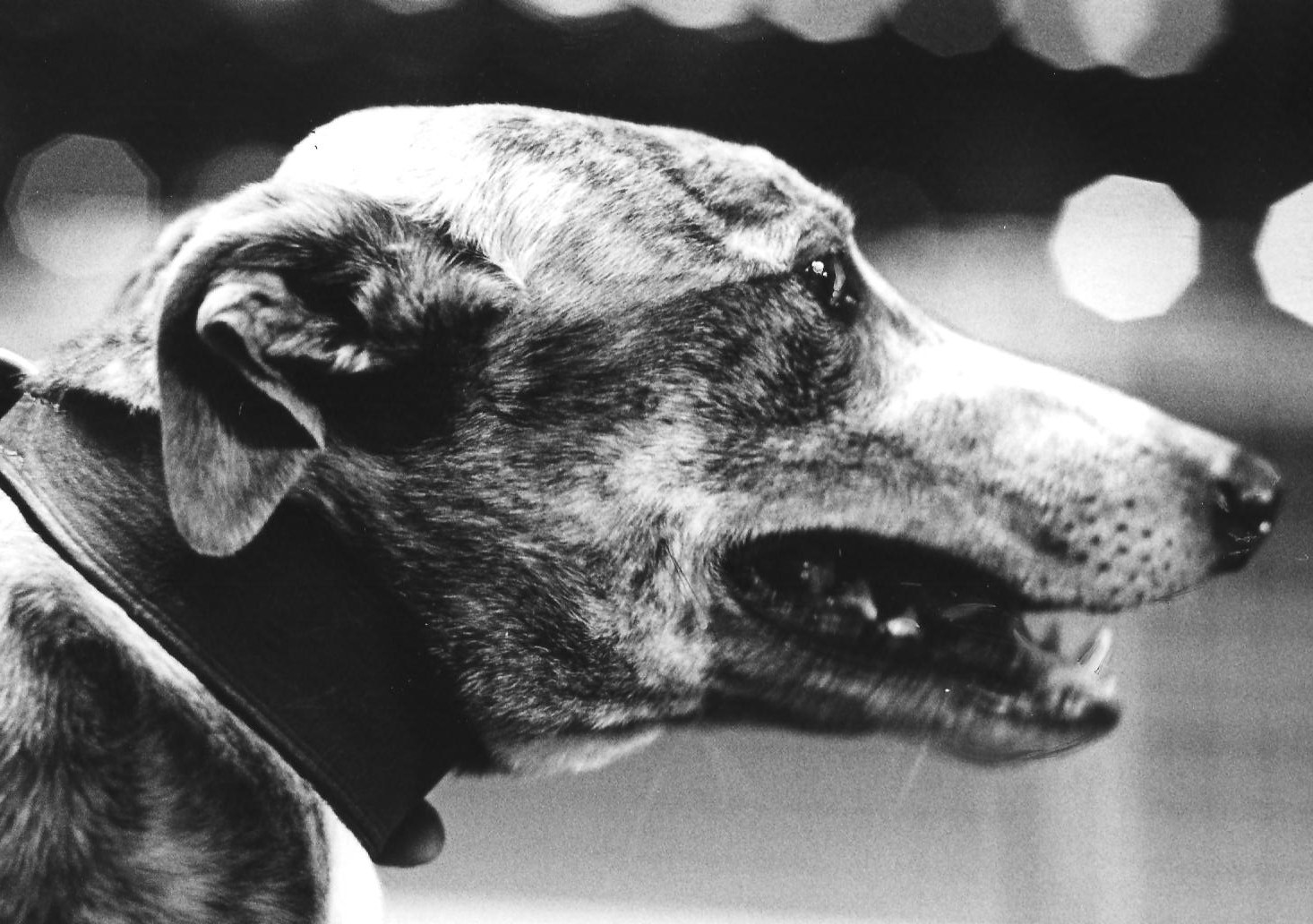
- 1984 champion Morans Beef
- Class: Feature
- Location: Limerick Greyhound Stadium
- Inaugurated: 1932
- Sponsor: Callaway Pro Am at Stud

Race information
- Distance: 550 yards
- Surface: Sand
- Purse: €30,000 (winner)

The St Leger is a greyhound racing competition held annually at Limerick Greyhound Stadium at Greenpark, Dock Road, Limerick, Ireland. The competition is an original classic race and was inaugurated in 1932 at Celtic Park in Belfast following the decision by the Irish Coursing Club to issue a new list of classic races.

As was the practice at the time the Bord na gCon switched the event each year to a different track. Clonmel Greyhound Stadium, Shelbourne Park and Harolds Cross all played host before it found a permanent home at the old Markets Field Greyhound Stadium in Limerick in 1944.

== Venues and distances ==
- Celtic Park (1932, 1943 550y)
- Clonmel (1933 550y)
- Shelbourne Park (1934, 1936, 1938, 1939 550y)
- Harolds Cross (1935, 1937, 1942 550y)
- Limerick (1940 & 1944–present 550y)

== Sponsors ==
- 1982–1987 (Smithwick's)
- 1988–1990 (Kantoher Co-op)
- 1991–2001 (Golden Vale)
- 2002–2017 (Kerry Agribusiness)
- 2018–2018 (Barking Buzz App)
- 2019–2020 (Friends of Limerick)
- 2021–2022 (Matchbook Betting Exchange)
- 2023–2024 (Will We Go)
- 2025–2025 (Denis Murphy)

== Past winners ==
Year	Winning Greyhound	Breeding	Time (sec)	Trainer	SP	Notes/ref
1932	Castle Eve	Fourth of July – Sally's Gossip	32.08			
1933	Brilliant Bob	Other Days – Birchfield Bessie	31.53			
1934	Chicken Sandwich	Heros Heart – Moor Girl	31.59			Track record
1935	Carras Son	Rubio – Cara	31.82			
1936	Moresby	Roving Bunty – False Colleen	31.68			
1937	Cheers For Ballyduff	Hes Next – Normans Fancy	31.42			
1938	Abbeylara	Prudent Turn – That's The Why	31.61			
1939	Negros Crown	Prudent Turn – Negros Pet	31.77			
1940	Cherrygrove Cross	Rejected Light – Dohora Lass	31.82			
1942	Monarch of the Glen	Carolina Prince – Turn of the Glen	31.28			
1943	Monarch of the Glen	Carolina Prince – Turn of the Glen	31.48			
1944	No Relation	Sweeping Cut – Halycon Heart	31.48			
1945	Dark Shadow	Ruby Border – Coming Now	31.37			Track record
1946	Star Point	Bawnmore Lad – Bright Duckling	31.55			
1947	Pouleen Boy	Another White Sandhills – Broken Weir	31.92			
1948	Beau Lion	Another Dancing Willie - Brevity	31.52		5/2	
1949	Ballybeg Surprise	Mad Tanist – My Little Diamond	31.55			
1950	Maddest Daughter	Clounehard Border – Maddest Yet	31.55			
1951	Ellas Ivy	Ivy Reef – Mara Lass	31.08			
1952	Silver Earl	King Silver – Ardmachree Eliza	31.25			
1953	Gortaleen	Shaggy Lad – Magic Maid	31.26			
1954	Mount Nagle Surprise	Ballybeg Surprise – Mount Nagle Girl	31.10			
1955	Doonmore Dreamer	Wee Chap – Again Ballyglass	30.98			
1956	Prince of Bermuda	Champion Prince – Sunora	30.66	Ger McKenna		Track record
1957	Kilcaskin Kern	Magourna Reject – Pavona	31.05			
1958	Firgrove Snowman	The Grand Champion – Firgrove Swallow	31.28			
1959	Ocean Swell	Glittering Look – Don't Ask	31.18			
1960	Swanlands Best	Man Of Pleasure – Swanland's Neighbour	31.60	Ger McKenna		
1961	Jerrys Clipper	Jerry's Special – Glittering Queenie	31.10	Jerry O'Dea		
1962	Apollo Again	Knockrour Again – Redondo Beach	31.26	Ger McKenna		
1963	General Courtnowski	Man Of Pleasure – Yoblstrap	31.12			
1964	Brook Jockey	Jockey's Glen – Endurance	31.66	P Boyce		
1965	Lovely Chieftain	Knockhill Chieftain – Lovely Sister	30.92	Ger McKenna		
1966	Movealong Santa	Champion Tipp – Movelong Sally	30.92			
1967	Yanka Boy	Clonalvy Pride – Millie Hawthorn	30.77	Ger McKenna		
1968	Pools Punter	Oregon Prince – Wild Countess	30.88		9/2	
1969	Own Pride	Always Proud – Kitty True	30.95	Ger McKenna		
1970	Mark Anthony	Prairie Flash - Shandaroba	31.02	Tom Lynch	6/1	
1971	Time Up Please	Newdown Heather – Dogstown Fame	30.56	Ger McKenna		
1972	Time Up Please	Newdown Heather – Dogstown Fame	31.05	Ger McKenna		
1973	Romping To Work	Swanky Pa – Go To Work	31.04	Larry Kelly		
1974	Lively Band	Silver Hope – Kells Queen	31.20	Jack Murphy		
1975	Ballybeg Prim	Rockfield Era – Ballybeg Pride	30.44	Ger McKenna		Track record
1976	Nameless Star	Rita's Choice – Itsastar	30.62	Ger McKenna		
1977	Red Rasper	Own Pride – Miss Honeygar	31.15	Ger McKenna		
1978	Rhu	Sole Aim – RigsdaleKuda	31.44	Matt O'Donnell		
1979	Airmount Champ	Hunday Champion – Winnies Call	31.20	Paddy Keane	5/1	
1980	Rahan Ship	Rail Ship – Rwanyena	30.72	Johnny Haynes		
1981	Oran Jack	Yellow Band – Spooky Lady	30.62	Rose Grealish		
1982	Supreme Tiger	Knockrour Tiger-Rising Tide	30.44	Matt O'Donnell		
1983	The Stranger	Dark Mercury – Lovely Blend	31.04	Christy O'Callaghan		
1984	Morans Beef	Noble Brigg – Rathkenny Bride	30.06	Ger McKenna		
1985	Ballintubber One	Killaclug Jet – Ballintubber Peg	30.42	Matt O'Donnell		
1986	Storm Villa	Aulton Villa – Storm Island	30.65	Matt O'Donnell	1/1f	
1987	Randy	Aulton Villa – Melanie	30.23	Christy Daly	5/2	
1988	Local Kate	Wise Band – Local Nell	31.04	Maurice Leahy	14/1	
1989	Dereen Star	Moral Support – Summer Crab	30.24	Matt O'Donnell	5/2	
1990	Alans Judy	I'm Slippy – Fairy Lawn	30.42	E. McMahon	2/1f	
1991	Castleland Dream	Powerstown Pax – Sail On Witch	30.22	Christy O'Callaghan	5/2	
1992	Barefoot Dash	Willie Joe – Kilmorna Pearl	30.40	Matt O'Donnell	7/2	
1993	Barefoot Marty	I'm Slippy – Cheeky Carmaur	30.54	Fraser Black	/	
1994	Kilvil Skinner	Mathews Gold – Keeleys Friend	30.84	Peter Pattinson	3/1	
1995	Batties Spirit	Batties Whisper – Lady Arrancourt	30.42	Matt O'Donnell	7/4f	
1996	Airmount Rogue	Glen Park Dancer – Airmount Kelly	29.89	Gerald Kiely	6/1	
1997	Fire Fly	Leaders Minstrel – Mark of Relief	30.36	AD Marshall	9/2	
1998	Deerfield Sunset	Vintage Prince - Sunset Blonde	30.03	Joe Kenny	5/4f	
1999	Frisby Flashing	Frightful Flash – Centenarys Dream	29.64	Reggie Roberts	1/1f	Track record
2000	Extra Dividend	Sassy Boy – Sunshine Penny	29.79	Dolores Ruth	8/1	
2001	Droopys Kewell	Larkhill Jo – Perrys Pusher	30.37	Michael Dunphy	5/2	
2002	Larking About	Larkhill Jo – Rockys Whisper	29.73	Paul Hennessy	9/4f	
2003	Mountleader Rolf	Smooth Rumble – Mountleader Diva	30.01	Geraldine O'Mahony	5/2	
2004	Never Give Up	Spiral Nikita – Dalcash Lament	29.88	Pat Buckley	7/1	
2005	Redbarn Panther	Jamella Tiger - Itsabouttimerose	29.72	Liam Egan	4/1	
2006	Indesacjack	Pacific Mile – JasonsSmokie	29.66	Jim Morrissey	2/1f	
2007	Lughill Jo	Larkhill Jo – Lughill Rose	29.37	Owen McKenna	3/1	
2008	Boherash Gaoithe	World Class – Boherash Charity	29.71	Joan Hanrahan	14/1	
2009	Bar Blackstone	Head Bound – Blackstone Sky	29.62	Sean Dunphy	2/1jf	
2010	Farley Turbo	Hondo Black – Blue Honey	29.57	Owen McKenna	3/1	Track record
2011	What A Tornado	Crash – Natural Energy	29.58	Paul Hennessy	7/4f	
2012	Cashen Mafuma	Cashen Legend – Shakira Live	29.57	Chris Houlihan	8/1	
2013	Locnamon Bridie	Royal Impact – Locnamon Nell	29.34	Paul Hennessy	3/1jf	
2014	Paradise Silva	Hondo Black – Dalcash Diva	29.50	Pat Buckley	6/4f	
2015	Skywalker Rory	Skywalker Puma – Tarsna Sal	29.47	Patrick Guilfoyle	7/2	
2016	Priceless Brandy	Mall Brandy – Tullowmac Java	29.30	Paul Hennessy	4/5f	
2017	Clonbrien Hero	Razldazl Jayfkay – Trout or Salmon	29.60	Graham Holland	5/2jf	
2018	Blastoff Jet	Droopys Jet – Blastoff Annie	29.65	Philip Buckley	5/1	
2019	Ballymac Anton	Ballymac Best – Coolavanny Angie	29.53	Liam Dowling	4/1	
2020	Epic Hero	Droopys Jet – Ravenna	29.44	Thomas O'Donovan	No SP	due to COVID-19
2021	Ballymac Merlin	Vulturi – Ballymac Belle	29.68	Liam Dowling	8/1	
2022	Bobsleigh Dream	Droopys Sydney – Bobsleigh Jet	29.84	Pat Buckley	11/8f	
2023	Clonbrien Treaty	Pestana – Clonbrien Millie	29.51	Graham Holland	5/4f	
2024	Clonbrien Treaty	Pestana – Clonbrien Millie	29.28	Graham Holland	5/4f	Record time for final
2025	Drombeg Banner	Explosive Boy – Hazelfield Echo	29.67	Evan McAuliffe	20/1	
