= 1995 Irish Greyhound Derby =

1995 Respond Irish Greyhound Derby
- Venue: Shelbourne Park
- Location: Dublin
- End date: 23 September
- Total prize money: £50,000 (winner)

The 1995 Irish Greyhound Derby took place during August and September with the final being held at Shelbourne Park in Dublin on 23 September 1995.

The winner Batties Rocket won £50,000 and was trained by Matt O'Donnell, owned and bred by Alicia Swaffield. The race was sponsored by the Kerry Group's dog food product 'Respond'.

== Final result ==
At Shelbourne, 23 September (over 550 yards):

| Position | Winner | Breeding | Trap | SP | Time | Trainer |
|---|---|---|---|---|---|---|
| 1st | Batties Rocket | Batties Whisper - Lady Arrancourt | 6 | 9-2 | 30.19 | Matt O'Donnell |
| 2nd | Batties Spirit | Batties Whisper - Lady Arrancourt | 4 | 7-2 | 30.23 | Matt O'Donnell |
| 3rd | Dew Reward | Phantom Flash - Highway Mystery | 3 | 6-4f | 30.38 | Michael O'Sullivan |
| 4th | Iago | Manx Treasure - Limekiln Pearl | 5 | 33-1 | 30.50 | Matt O'Donnell |
| 5th | Liffey Mills | Phantom Flash - Newhill Abbey | 1 | 5-1 | 30.63 | Ger McKenna |
| 6th | Summerhill Joy | Low Sail - Grange Joy | 2 | 10-1 | 30.64 | Michael Enright |

=== Distances ===
½, 1¾, 1½, 1½, short-head (lengths)

== Competition Report ==
Trainer Nick Savva sent his 1994 greyhound of the year Westmead Chick and the recent Bar One International winner Westmead Merlin over to Ireland from the UK but in a significant misunderstanding he had failed to bring their stud cards (not needed in UK racing because of the NGRC identity book system). Both had to be withdrawn in an what was a disaster for Savva and the competition. Then Ireland's leading trainer Ger McKenna had greyhounds withdrawn for the same reason but had no misunderstanding to blame.

With the two Westmeads missing it was left to Michael Enright’s 1995 English Greyhound Derby runner-up Summerhill Joy to take the tag as the ante post favourite. Matt O’Donnell and Ger McKenna were well represented as usual as was the exiled John 'Ginger' McGee Sr.

Summerhill Joy duly recorded the fastest qualifying time in 30.33 sec and O’Donnell’s River Lad followed that up by becoming the best in round one with 30.34 but Irish Oaks winner Cool Survivor and Velvet Rocket were both eliminated. Another O’Donnell star Batties Spirit set the standard in round two with a 30.24.

Michael O'Donovan’s Dew Reward impressed throughout the competition and in the quarter-finals Matt O'Donnell trained four runners through to the semi-finals. The first of those four put his name in the record books producing a track record of 29.97 and breaking the 30 second barrier for 550 yards. The previous mark (29.99) by Trade Official set two months previous had been bettered. Batties Rocket and Iago earned O'Donnell two more finalists. The second semi-final resulted in Batties Spirit defeating Summerhill Joy and Liffey Mills.

Dew Reward was a hot favourite for the final but made a mess of the start, this left Batties Rocket to take up the early lead before his sister Batties Spirit challenged. At the first bend Dew Reward was making progress but as Batties Spirit was forced to check she bumped into Dew Reward leaving Batties Rocket with a clear lead. He held on despite a renewed attempt from his sister who only lost out by three quarters of a length.

== See also ==
- 1995 UK & Ireland Greyhound Racing Year
