= 1991 Irish Greyhound Derby =

Irish Greyhound race

1991 Respond Irish Greyhound Derby
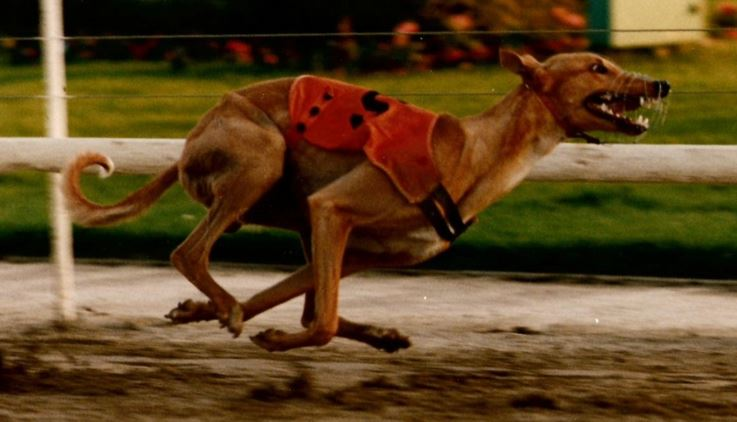
- Dempseys Whisper was eliminated in the quarter final
- Venue: Shelbourne Park
- Location: Dublin
- End date: 14 September
- Total prize money: £30,000 (winner)

The 1991 Irish Greyhound Derby took place during August and September with the final being held at Shelbourne Park in Dublin on 14 September 1991.

The winner Ardfert Mick (named after Ardfert local Mike Mulrennan) won £30,000 and was trained by Matt O'Donnell, owned by Noel Clifford and bred by Maurice Harty. The race was sponsored by the Kerry Group's dog food product 'Respond'.

== Final result ==
At Shelbourne, 14 September (over 550 yards):

Position	Winner	Breeding	Trap	SP	Time	Trainer
1st	Ardfert Mick	Ardfert Sean – Boher Rita	1	11-4	30.19	Matt O'Donnell
2nd	Ask Clare	Ardfert Sean – Boher Rita	4	7-1	30.35	Jerome Keane
3rd	Super Gem	Summerhill Gem – Black Survivor	2	25-1	30.61	Joe Kenny
4th	Lyons Monks	The Other Risk – Mountkeeffe Lady	5	20-1	30.62	John Coleman
5th	Farloe Melody	Lodge Prince – Chini Chin Chin	6	6-4f	30.77	Matt O'Donnell
6th	Coalbrook Tiger	Skelligs Tiger – Summer Flower	3	7-2	00.00	Padraig Campion

=== Distances ===
2, 3¼, short-head, 1¾, dnf (lengths)

== Quarter finals ==
Heat 1 (Sep 3)
Pos	Name	SP	Time
1st	Matthews Gold	7-4f	30.45
2nd	Meet Me Halfway	5-1	30.53
3rd	Brandy Fitz	14-1	30.71
4th	Deenside Dasher	66-1	30.91
5th	Haremania	5-1	30.93
6th	Dempseys Whisper	5-2	30.95

Heat 2 (Sep 3)
Pos	Name	SP	Time
1st	Coalbrook Tiger	8-11f	30.29
2nd	Orlando Jack	14-1	30.85
3rd	Parquet Pet	2-1	31.01
4th	Derrymore Moon	7-1	31.21
5th	South Salonica	12-1	31.23
6th	All Jitters	14-1	31.51

Heat 3 (Sep 3)
Pos	Name	SP	Time
1st	Terrydrum Tico	4-7f	30.40
2nd	Summerhill Super	2-1	30.68
3rd	Colwin	12-1	30.80
4th	Avoid The Clash	12-1	30.84
5th	Yale Heights	8-1	31.08
N/R	Itsallovernow		

Heat 4 (Sep 3)
Pos	Name	SP	Time
1st	Ask Clare	3-1	30.46
2nd	Salisbury	6-1	30.66
3rd	Slippys Quest	7-1	30.90
4th	Me Know Nothing	6-1	31.14
5th	Millers Imp	7-4f	31.17
6th	Katies Gold	8-1	31.29

Heat 5 (Sep 3)
Pos	Name	SP	Time
1st	Early Potter	6-1	30.45
2nd	Super Gem	5-2	30.51
3rd	Ballyoughter Lad	2-5f	30.54
4th	Hazel Quest	6-1	31.18
N/R	The Other Night		
N/R	Frozen Problem		

Heat 6 (Sep 3)
Pos	Name	SP	Time
1st	Farloe Melody	3-1	30.38
2nd	Lyons Monks	8-1	30.74
3rd	Ardfert Mick	5-4f	30.78
4th	Odell Valley	16-1	30.84
5th	Village Support	3-1	30.90
6th	Forever N Ever	25-1	31.02

== Semi finals ==
First Semi Final (Sep 7)
Pos	Name of Greyhound	SP	Time	Trainer
1st	Farloe Melody	5-2f	30.25	O'Donnell
2nd	Ardfert Mick	11-4	30.61	O'Donnell
3rd	Parquet Pet	10-1	30.81	Hitch
4th	Matthews Gold	3-1	30.87	Kinane
5th	Ballyoughter Lad	8-1	31.07	McKenna
6th	Salisbury	50-1	31.10	Hitch

Second Semi Final (Sep 7)
Pos	Name of Greyhound	SP	Time	Trainer
1st	Super Gem	14-1	30.51	Kenny
2nd	Coalbrook Tiger	7-4jf	30.55	Campion
3rd	Early Potter	10-1	30.71	Bolton
4th	Terrydrum Tico	7-4jf	30.91	Lennon
5th	Meet Me Halfway	7-1	30.94	
6th	Orlando Jack	11-1	31.06	Hayes

Third Semi Final (Sep 7)
Pos	Name of Greyhound	SP	Time	Trainer
1st	Ask Clare	2-1	30.26	Keane
2nd	Lyons Monks	8-1	30.64	Coleman
3rd	Colwin	16-1	30.88	O'Connor
4th	Brandy Fitz	12-1	31.24	
5th	Slippys Quest	8-1	31.28	McEllistrim
6th	Summerhill Super	11-8f	31.52	Enright

== Competition Report ==
Matt O'Donnell entered eleven runners in an attempt to successfully defend the Respond Irish Derby title. All twelve safely negotiated the qualifying round. Among them was Farloe Melody and Ardfert Mick the winner of the Cox Cup at Newbridge Greyhound Stadium and Febo Champion Stakes, he had posted a new track record in the Cox Cup recording 28.68.

The fastest qualifier was Tipperary Cup champion Coalbrook Tiger in 30.13, followed by the John Coleman trained £10,000 Tennents Extra champion Satharn Lady in 30.17. Terrydrum Tico, Ardfert Mick and Coalbrook Tiger all successfully won their second round heats but Satharn Lady suffered a serious injury.

The quarter finals winners were Coalbrook Tiger (30.29), Farloe Melody (30.38), Terrydrum Tico (30.40), Mathews Gold (30.45), Early Potter (30.45) and Ask Clare (30.46). The first semi-final saw Farloe Melody defeat kennelmate Ardfert Mick before Super Gem provided a shock with a success over Coalbrook Tiger. Ask Clare beat the main English challenger Lyons Monk in the final heat.

Both Coalbrook Tiger and Farloe Melody made a hash of the start when the traps lifted, leaving Ask Clare in the lead pursued by his brother Ardfert Mick. Ardfert Mick took a first bend lead and drew clear. Coalbrook Tiger was knocked over and broke a hock. The win gave Matt O'Donnell two titles in a row and it was the first time that two full litter greyhounds had taken the first two places.

== See also ==
- 1992 UK & Ireland Greyhound Racing Year
