= 1990 Irish Greyhound Derby =

1990 Respond Irish Greyhound Derby
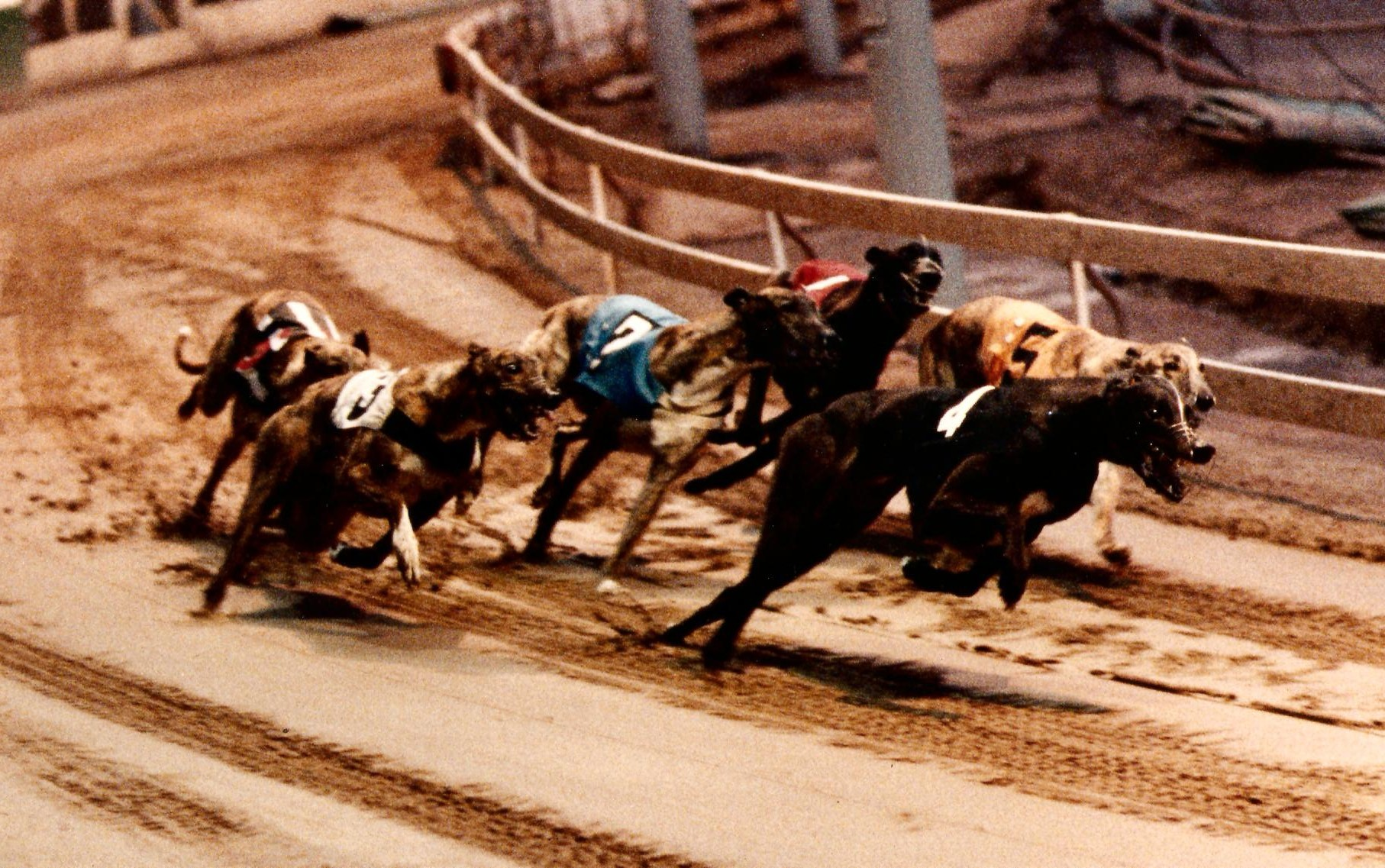
- Phantom Flash in action
- Venue: Shelbourne Park
- Location: Dublin
- End date: 15 September
- Total prize money: £30,000 (winner)

The 1990 Irish Greyhound Derby took place during August and September with the final being held at Shelbourne Park in Dublin on 15 September 1990.

The winner The Other Toss won £30,000 and was trained by Matt O'Donnell, owned by John Houilhan and bred by Michael Lonergan. The race was sponsored by the Kerry Group's dog food product 'Respond'.

== Final result ==
At Shelbourne, 15 September (over 550 yards):

Position	Winner	Breeding	Trap	SP	Time	Trainer
1st	The Other Toss	The Other Risk - Knocknaboha Snap	4	3-1	30.14	Matt O'Donnell
2nd	Pets Echo	Echo Spark - Ballyoughter Pet	5	12-1	30.26	Martin White
3rd	Phantom Flash	Flashy Sir - Westmead Seal	3	11-8f	30.42	Nick Savva
4th	Monaleen Stag	The Other Risk - Snakes Whisper	6	8-1	30.66	Matt O'Donnell
5th	Rosden Speedy	Aulton Villa - Keen Exile	2	14-1	30.86	Kenny Linzell
6th	Toss Pit	Jamie Harmony - Moher Flash	1	9-2	30.94	Alan Black

=== Distances ===
1½, 1¾, 3, 2½, 1 (lengths)

== Competition Report ==
The short lived points system used in the 1989 Irish Greyhound Derby had been scrapped to the relief of the Irish racing public. However, there was a repechage which was lucky for Phantom Flash because the Nick Savva trained black dog failed to progress in the qualifying round. The ante-post favourite with a huge reputation had a chance to make amends and did with an extremely fast 30.24 to progress; it was better than the best qualifying round time of 30.50 set by Ballybrack Charm.

In the first round Phantom Flash went even faster defeating kennelmate Westmead Harry by six lengths in 30.10 and Ger McKenna had a treble with Concentration, Itsallovernow and Bordout. Adraville Bridge second in the betting behind Phantom Flash failed to make the second round following a virus and he was a non-runner.

Phantom Flash, The Other Toss and Maryville Kyle all impressed in round two and going into the semi-finals Phantom Flash was hot favourite to become the first ever British Bred winner of the classic. He scored an easy semi-final victory from Rosden Speedy and The Other Toss (who was 100-1 before the competition started) won again from Monaleen Stag. Finally Toss Pit scored a win ahead of Pets Echo to complete the final line up.

In the final as the traps lifted Phantom Flash made a terrible start ending his hopes. Pets Echo and The Other Toss made great starts and the latter soon took the lead from Pets Echo and ran out an impressive winner. The unlucky Phantom Flash made good ground to finish third.

== See also ==
- 1990 UK & Ireland Greyhound Racing Year
