= 2002 UK & Ireland Greyhound Racing Year =

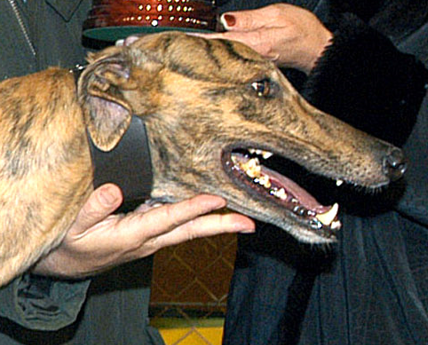
- 2002 Milton Keynes Derby winner El Ronan

The 2002 UK & Ireland Greyhound Racing Year was the 77th year of greyhound racing in the United Kingdom and the 76th year of greyhound racing in Ireland.

== Roll of honour ==
Major Winners
Award	Name of Winner
2002 English Greyhound Derby	Allen Gift
2002 Irish Greyhound Derby	Bypass Byway
2002 Scottish Greyhound Derby	Priceless Rebel
Greyhound Trainer of the Year	Linda Jones
Greyhound of the Year	Droopys Rhys
Irish Dog and Bitch of the Year	Bypass Byway / Longvalley Tina

Trainers Championship, Hove (26 March)
Pos	Name of Trainer	Points
1st	Brian Clemenson	44
2nd	Linda Jones	40
3rd	Paul Young	40
4th	Charlie Lister	33
5th	Elaine Parker	29
6th	John Mullins	22

== Summary ==
The National Greyhound Racing Club (NGRC) released the annual returns, with totalisator turnover at £92,723,060 from 6190 meetings.

Droopys Rhys trained by Ted Soppitt was voted Greyhound of the Year. The blue dog had finished third in the Scottish Greyhound Derby behind Priceless Rebel before travelling to Ireland and staying with Reggie Roberts when finishing runner up in the Irish Greyhound Derby behind Bypass Byway. He had missed the English Derby before winning the Steel City Cup and Select Stakes. It had transpired that during that Irish Derby final Droopys Rhys had sustained a fracture on the hock and was later retired. Linda Jones was voted Greyhound Trainer of the Year for the second successive year.

An opportunity was missed by the track promoters as the British Greyhound Racing Board announced they were looking for a 'New Deal'. The BGR Fund stood at £5 million and the BGRB headed by Chief Executive Geoffrey Thomas demanded a better deal, they drew up controversial plans to control the intellectual property rights and a continued battle ensued. The Bookmakers Afternoon Greyhound Service were unwilling to pay more and significantly increased the prize money at the bookmaker owned tracks in an attempt to combat the threat of property rights. William Hill also bought their first greyhound track after securing a deal for Sunderland; a move seen as a consequence of the politics surrounding the 'New Deal'. Tracks fearing losing their BAGS contract eventually backed down leaving the industry dependent on bookmaker contributions. The dispute continued with regular bitter racing press headlines, the deal eventually died.

== Tracks ==
The BS Group took over from Allied Presentations at Reading to add to their portfolio of tracks that included Abbey Stadium, Milton Keynes and Poole.

== News ==
Australian stud dogs have a major influence in the breeding lines, Top Honcho an Australian born black dog became the top sire for the second year running. This further damaged the English breeding and Australian lines very often crossed which could be a problem. Racing Managers also noticed that Australian bred greyhounds brought a lack of track craft and lack of wide runners. Floyd Amphlett had predicted the Australian invasion way back in 1993.

Charlie Lister suffered a suspected stroke, his head lad Chris Akers took on extra responsibilities at the Newark kennels. Seamus Cahill and Bernie Doyle both joined Wimbledon from Catford and Reading respectively. Kelly Mullins became the third son of former champion trainer Linda Mullins to enter the training ranks, he acquired kennels near Slough and began training in April.

== Competitions ==
The Ladbrokes Summer Stayers Classic was introduced at Monmore with a £7,500 to the winner and £12,000 total prize money giving it Category One status, there were now 34 races listed as category one, a remarkable difference from the original ten classics. The Scottish Greyhound Derby at Shawfield Stadium increased their first prize to £25,000 giving the event the second biggest reward behind the English Derby. Jonathan Hobbs of the Racing Post is instrumental in producing a successful greyhound annual.

Top Savings won the Juvenile by 8¾ lengths. Allen Gift made the Scurry Gold Cup final at Catford but had to be withdrawn, the race was won by Patsy Byrne's Letter Slippy. Allen Gift never found form again and the Derby champion had the injustice of losing in graded races at home track Hove towards the end of his career.

Brian Clemenson won his first trainers championship before dominating the Cesarewitch with three finalists and the 4-5 favourite Cuba duly won. Cuba finished runner up to Sheriff Bow Wow in the Grand Prix final at Walthamstow. Sheriff Bow Wow in turn finished runner up to Alibuk Lad in the St Leger final.

== Ireland ==
Compared to 2001 the Irish year was relatively quiet despite the star greyhound Late Late Show winning the early season BCR Press Easter Cup. By the time he made an attempt at the Derby he was passed his best form; the Derby went to Bypass Byway who was duly voted Irish Dog of the Year.

== Principal UK races ==
William Hill Grand National, Wimbledon (19 March, 460m h, £7,500)
Pos	Name of Greyhound	Trainer	SP	Time	Trap
1st	Ballyvorda Class	Tom Foster	7-4f	28.24	6
2nd	Top Jock	Seamus Cahill	5-2	28.36	1
3rd	Notanotherphoto	Ray Peacock	5-2	28.48	2
4th	Patriot Man	Barry O'Sullivan	8-1	28.58	5
5th	Corelish Cruiser	Tom Foster	10-1	28.64	4
6th	Born To Go	Tom Foster	14-1	29.00	3

Regal Scottish Derby, Shawfield (13 April, 480m, £25,000)
Pos	Name of Greyhound	Trainer	SP	Time	Trap
1st	Priceless Rebel	Paul Hennessy	5-2	29.08	1
2nd	Santovita	Charlie Lister	1-1f	29.10	2
3rd	Droopys Rhys	Ted Soppitt	3-1	29.30	3
4th	Seskin Robert	Charlie Lister	10-1	29.64	6
5th	Knockeevan King	Tom Flaherty	10-1	29.78	5
6th	Blonde Countess	John Mullins	66-1	29.80	4

Scurry Gold Cup, Catford (22 June, 385m, £3,000)
Pos	Name of Greyhound	Trainer	SP	Time	Trap
1st	Letter Slippy	Patsy Byrne	5-2	23.73	4
2nd	Bangor Peer	Martin Burt	10-1	24.00	3
3rd	Courts Ad Jo	Jim Reynolds	7-2	24.02	5
4th	Blonde Bandit	John Mullins	9-2	24.03	1
5th	Melbridann	John Mullins	6-4f	24.24	2
N/R	Allen Gift	Claude Gardiner			

Reading Masters, Reading (7 July, 465m, £20,000)
Pos	Name of Greyhound	Trainer	SP	Time	Trap
1st	Aranock Lance	Paul Young	7-1	27.95	4
2nd	Willie Go Fa	Brian Clemenson	3-1	28.05	3
3rd	Bruno	Richard Christie	4-1	28.17	6
4th	Lochbo Hunter	Gary Sallis	16-1	28.29	1
5th	Lozzas Dream	Derek Knight	10-11f	28.33	2
6th	Droopys Omega	Nikki Chambers	33-1	28.47	5

William Hill Cesarewitch, Oxford (23 July, 645m, £5,000)
Pos	Name of Greyhound	Trainer	SP	Time	Trap
1st	Cuba	Brian Clemenson	4-5f	40.18	3
2nd	Ali Qapu Oak	Richard Ward	10-1	40.26	1
3rd	Maui Magic	Brian Clemenson	5-1	40.40	6
4th	Toms Monarch	Paul Walden	25-1	40.65	5
5th	Oddser McDuff	Steven Harrison	9-2	40.67	2
6th	Lottys Magic	Brian Clemenson	10-1	40.71	4

William Hill Gold Collar, Catford (21 September, 555m, £7,500)
Pos	Name of Greyhound	Trainer	SP	Time	Trap
1st	Shevchenko	Seamus Cahill	4-5f	35.13	4
2nd	Cill Dubh Turbo	Nick Savva	11-4	35.39	5
3rd	Ballymac Rumbles	Norah McEllistrim	14-1	35.31	6
4th	Fairhill Star	Maxine Locke	12-1	35.40	2
5th	Bockos the Bizz	Tony Taylor	3-1	35.66	1
N/R	Droopys Candice	Brian Clemenson	i/s		3

Victor Chandler Grand Prix, Walthamstow (5 October, 640m, £10,000)
Pos	Name of Greyhound	Trainer	SP	Time	Trap
1st	Sheriff Bow Wow	John Mullins	8-1	40.05	5
2nd	Cuba	Brian Clemenson	7-2	40.19	3
3rd	Alibulk Lad	Dilys Steels	10-3	40.20	6
4th	Blonde Lass	John Mullins	11-4f	40.24	2
5th	Countrywide Mean	Paul Young	10-1	40.54	4
6th	Daphs Babe	Graham Sharp	6-1	40.70	1

William Hill TV Trophy, Wimbledon (1 October, 868m, £6,000)
Pos	Name of Greyhound	Trainer	SP	Time	Trap
1st	Serious Dog	Paul Young	4-1	55.17	4
2nd	Form of Magic	Brian Clemenson	7-4f	55.18	6
3rd	Downdaniel Jewel	Derek Knight	6-1	55.28	5
4th	Knockaun Tiger	Charlie Lister	7-2	55.38	2
5th	Metric Tiger	John Haynes	6-1	55.54	3
6th	Rosden Chewy	Seamus Cahill	10-1	55.68	1

William Hill Laurels, Belle Vue (22 October, 465m, £8,000)
Pos	Name of Greyhound	Trainer	SP	Time	Trap
1st	Full Cigar	Liz McNair	11-4	27.94	2
2nd	April Playboy	Ken Bebbington	11-2	28.34	3
3rd	Droopys Hewitt	Nick Savva	7-4f	28.54	5
4th	Scorched Economy	John Walton	33-1	28.72	4
5th	Lozzas Dream	Derek Knight	5-2	28.89	1
6th	Later	Pat Rosney	14-1	29.04	6

William Hill St Leger, Wimbledon (5 November, 660m, £12,000)
Pos	Name of Greyhound	Trainer	SP	Time	Trap
1st	Alibuk Lad	Dilys Steels	10-1	40.95	4
2nd	Sheriff Bow Wow	John Mullins	12-1	41.05	6
3rd	Form of Magic	Brian Clemenson	7-4f	41.08	5
4th	Arun Sky	Derek Knight	3-1	41.11	1
5th	Frisby Fassan	Harry Crapper	3-1	41.13	3
6th	Opus Magic	Pat Thompson	12-1	41.33	2

William Hill Oaks, Wimbledon (3 December, 480m, £6,000)
Pos	Name of Greyhound	Trainer	SP	Time	Trap
1st	Purley Queen	Norah McEllistrim	8-1	29.14	2
2nd	Simply Vintage	Tom Foster	6-4f	29.32	4
3rd	Knockeevan Hollie	Paul Young	7-4	29.34	6
4th	Armani Pearl	Jim Reynolds	8-1	29.35	3
5th	Southlodge Rage	Nick Colton	8-1	29.38	1
6th	Purely Belter	Cheryl Miller	7-1	29.39	5

=== Principal Irish finals ===
BCR Press Easter Cup Shelbourne (Apr 13, 525y, €35,000)
Pos	Name of Greyhound	SP	Time	Trap
1st	Late Late Show	4-9f	28.74	6
2nd	Word of God	5-1	28.81	1
3rd	Moving Customer	12-1	28.84	5
4th	Whitefort Frazer	12-1	28.90	2
5th	Athboy Vintage	12-1	28.92	3
6th	Fairy Man	50-1	29.20	4

National Produce Thurles (April 28, 525y, €35,000)
Pos	Name of Greyhound	SP	Time	Trap
1st	Give And Go	5-2	29.19	2
2nd	Borna Dasher		29.21	6
3rd	Droopys Agassi		29.24	5
4th	Rebel Watcher		29.28	1
5th	Borna Pilot		29.30	3
6th	Mustang Buster		29.86	4

Shelbourne 600 Shelbourne (May 11, 600y, €35,000)
Pos	Name of Greyhound	SP	Time	Trap
1st	Haliska Vienna	20-1	32.69	3
2nd	Topofthebest	9-2	32.71	6
3rd	The Other Master	14-1	32.81	4
4th	Moving Customer	6-1	32.88	1
5th	Late Late Show	4-7f	33.16	5
6th	Couch Trip	33-1	33.17	2

St Leger Limerick (Jun 30, 550y, €35,000)
Pos	Name of Greyhound	SP	Time	Trap
1st	Larking About	9-4f	29.73	4
2nd	Droopys Gloria	3-1	30.01	1
3rd	Rummy Lad	7-1	30.18	2
4th	Mega Delight	7-2	30.24	3
5th	Bold Mossy	5-2	30.29	6
6th	Larkhill Blackie	10-1	30.32	5

Sporting Press Oaks Shelbourne (Jul 20 525y, €35,000)
Pos	Name of Greyhound	SP	Time	Trap
1st	Lifes Beauty	6-1	28.70	4
2nd	Crossleigh Lark	6-1	28.77	5
3rd	Longvalley Tina	7-4f	28.94	6
4th	Hey Good Lookin	5-1	28.95	2
5th	Axle Grease	5-2	29.09	1
6th	Allen Joy	50-1	29.15	5

Boylesports Champion Stakes Shelbourne (Aug 30, 550y, €30,000)
Pos	Name of Greyhound	SP	Time	Trap
1st	Longvalley Tina	8-1	30.15	2
2nd	Olden Times	4-1	30.16	1
3rd	Late Late Show	6-4f	30.23	3
4th	Bold Mossy	8-1	30.24	6
5th	Larkhill Lotto	7-1	30.45	4
6th	Bypass Byway	5-2	30.62	5

BCR Press/Droopys Vieri Puppy Derby Harolds Cross (Sep 27, 525y, €35,000)
Pos	Name of Greyhound	SP	Time	Trap
1st	Fortune Mike	9-4	28.40	6
2nd	Odette	25-1	28.41	3
3rd	Funcheon Premier	4-1	28.43	2
4th	Vinnys the Best	25-1	28.71	5
5th	Sparkling Joe	33-1	28.92	4
6th	Ten Men	5-4f	28.95	1

Co-Op Superstores Laurels Cork (Oct 19, 525y, €35,000)
Pos	Name of Greyhound	SP	Time	Trap
1st	Annual Award	7-1	28.61	1
2nd	Confident Choice	10-1	28.85	3
3rd	Mustang Buster	5-4f	28.91	6
4th	Annamore Billy	2-1	29.08	4
5th	Borna Dasher	8-1	29.99	5
6th	Mustang Bertie	33-1	00.00	2

== Totalisator returns ==
Extended content

The totalisator returns declared to the National Greyhound Racing Club for the year 2002 are listed below.

Stadium	Turnover £
Walthamstow	13,229,761
Wimbledon	9,184,763
Romford	8,287,059
Belle Vue	6,103,183
Brighton & Hove	5,442,004
Hall Green	5,332,969
Peterborough	4,451,012
Sheffield	4,038,046
Catford	3,639,268
Perry Barr	2,912,134
Oxford	2,617,604

Stadium	Turnover £
Crayford	2,595,335
Sunderland	2,488,407
Yarmouth	2,096,110
Nottingham	2,082,375
Monmore	2,020,967
Milton Keynes	1,998,285
Poole	1,836,866
Shawfield	1,820,513
Swindon	1,634,579
Portsmouth	1,622,306
Sittingbourne	1,528,071

Stadium	Turnover £
Brough Park	1,319,072
Kinsley	942,154
Harlow	911,453
Stainforth	814,633
Reading	726,477
Hull	326,663
Mildenhall	300,322
Henlow	250,303
Rye House	170,366
