= 1992 UK & Ireland Greyhound Racing Year =

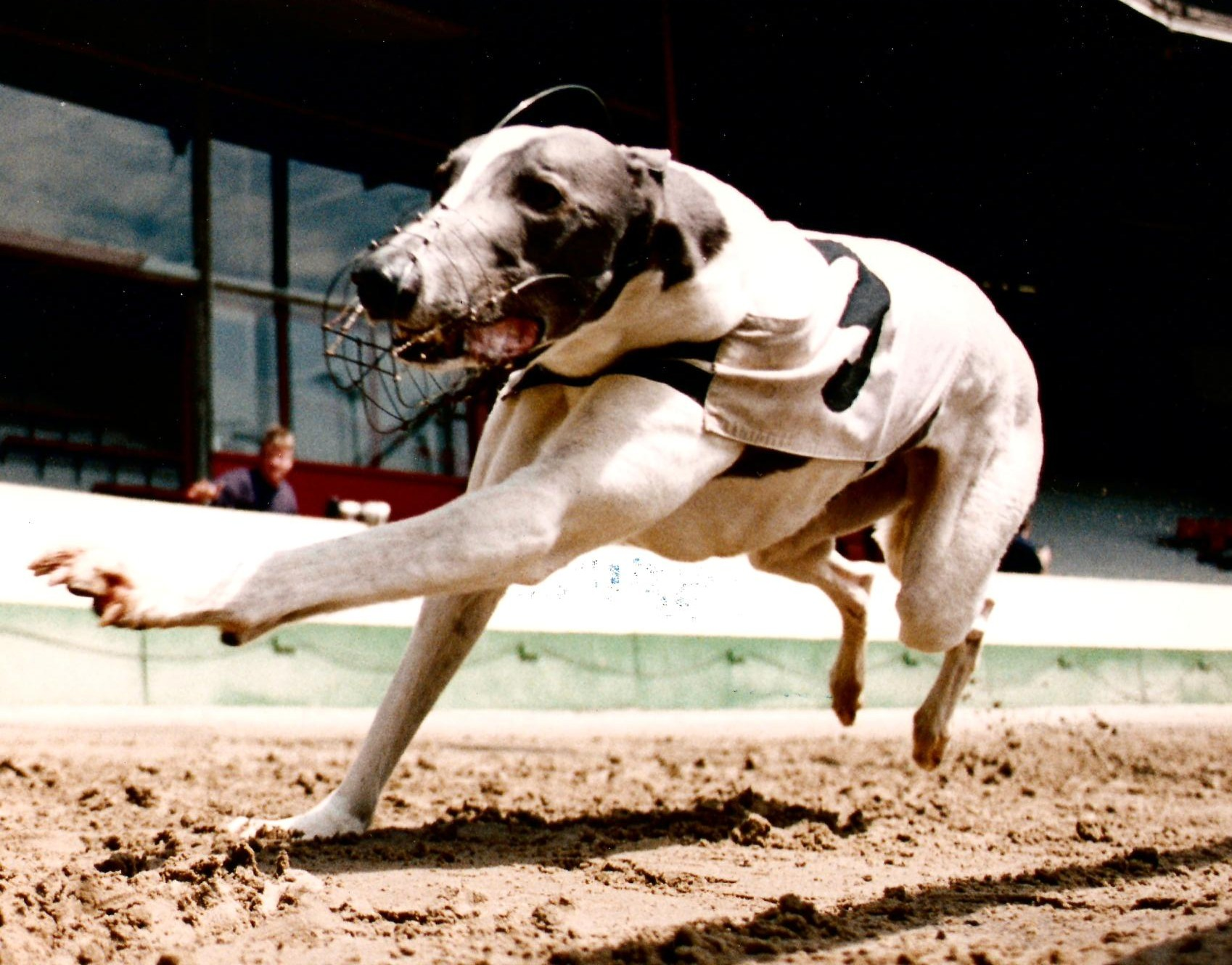
- Greyhound of the Year Murlens Abbey

The 1992 UK & Ireland Greyhound Racing Year was the 67th year of greyhound racing in the United Kingdom and the 66th year of greyhound racing in Ireland.

== Roll of honour ==
Major winners
Award	Name of winner
1992 English Greyhound Derby	Farloe Melody
1992 Irish Greyhound Derby	Manx Treasure
1992 Scottish Greyhound Derby	Glideaway Silver
Greyhound Trainer of the Year	John McGee Sr.
Greyhound of the Year	Murlens Abbey
Irish Greyhound of the Year	Farloe Melody
Trainers Championship	John McGee Sr.

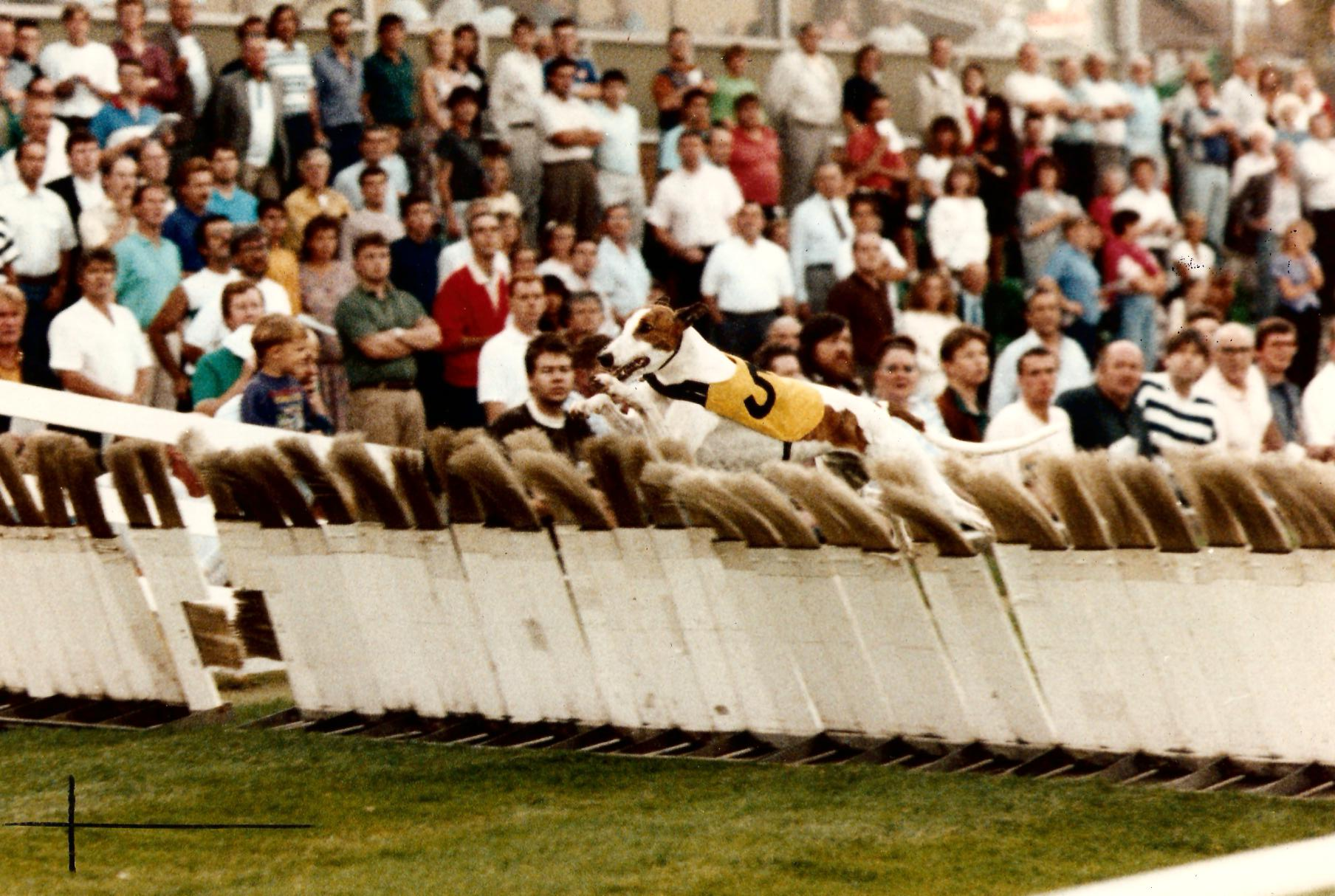
Hurdling champion Kildare Slippy in 1992

== Summary ==
The industry finally received a levy of sorts. On 10 March Tory chancellor Norman Lamont announced a reduction in betting tax and asked the bookmakers for a voluntary arrangement whereby a fund could be directed to the greyhound racing industry. He had given a clear signal that he expected bookmakers to pay the industry and the British Greyhound Racing Fund was born. This fund relied on the voluntary payments of bookmakers and the big three firms Ladbrokes, William Hill and Corals paid and encouraged smaller bookmakers to participate.

The positive was that bookmakers had agreed but the negative was that the payment equated to 0.25%. The proposed payment resulted in the Greyhound Board refusing to agree with a fund that was controlled by the bookmakers. However they would eventually give in and accepted the £1.2 million, which mainly went back into prize money.

The National Greyhound Racing Club (NGRC) released the annual returns, with totalisator turnover at £91,766,414 and attendances recorded at 3,864,288 from 6154 meetings. The 17.5% track tote deduction was ended with tracks now able to choose their own percentage which inevitably resulted in increases; the Greyhound Racing Association and Corals angered patrons by charging 25%, followed by Ladbrokes at 19.7%.

Murlens Abbey trained by John Copplestone was voted Greyhound of the Year after winning the Arc, the Edinburgh Cup and the East Anglian Derby. Farloe Melody was voted Irish Greyhound of the Year after winning the 1992 English Greyhound Derby, Easter Cup and Dundalk International.

John McGee won the Greyhound Trainer of the Year for the fifth successive year. He also secured his second Trainers Championship, winning four of the eight races that formed the event, he finished on 56 points, which was 22 points ahead of second placed Patsy Byrne on 34.

== Tracks ==
Corals sold Powderhall to Eddie Ramsay. Independent track Berwick opened but Aldershot in Tongham closed in November.

The debt ridden Brent Walker the owners of William Hill and Hackney Wick Stadium were selling assets in order to avoid administration.

== News ==
Racing expanded with betting shops allowed to open in the evenings and on Sundays, the first ever Sunday fixture was held at Sunderland featuring the Mailcom Northern Puppy Derby heats. GRA parent company Wembley plc. announced losses of £8m despite a £13m profit in its UK operation.

Canterbury play host to a new TV channel called Sportscast and also scrapped eight dog races on evening cards after tote turnover on them drops lower than six dog races. British Breeding shows a significant decrease from 43% to 26% of registered greyhounds and continues to go down.

== Competitions ==
The best hurdler since Sherrys Prince emerged, a white and brindle dog called Kildare Slippy. The Paddy Hancox trained greyhound had reached the 1991 Grand National final, at Hall Green. He won the 1992 Grand National final by 9¾ lengths recording 28.52, a new track record. When the time was announced it stunned the crowd because the track record for 474 metres on the flat at Hall Green was 28.56. Kildare Slippy had just jumped five hurdles and completed the circuit four spots (1 spot = 0.01 sec) faster than the existing flat record making it one of the greatest individual runs in history. In addition to the run he broke the track record at Catford setting new figures of 23.73 which was faster than the Scurry Gold Cup final. A 28.09 track record at Powderhall was just nine spots slower than the time set by Murlens Abbey (the eventual greyhound of the year) in the Edinburgh Cup final. He won the Scottish Grand National before he attempted to win the Irish Grand National. Despite a new track record at Shelbourne Park in an incredible 29.18, he missed the break in the final and failed to achieve the triple crown. A Linda Mullins trained hurdler called Deerpark Jim won 31 races form 45 starts and was denied greater success because Kildare Slippy was around the same time.

An event called the Reading Masters was inaugurated with the provincial track of Reading offering a first prize of £15,000. Terry Kibble's Dempsey Duke was the first winner. The Scottish Greyhound Derby ended in a win for Glideaway Sam but only because the Irish Derby champion Ardfert Mick, trained by Matt O'Donnell suffered a serious injury when easily set for victory, he passed the line trailing in last and badly lame.

Natalie and Nick Savva enjoyed a great year with a 1–2 in the John Humphreys Gold Collar final with Westmead Suprise and Westmead Spirit, followed by the Laurent Perrier Grand Prix success of Westmead Darkie. A Laurels 1–2 with Balligari and Right Move was next ending with a St Leger final appearance for Westmead Darkie. Pineapple Lemon defeated Murlens Abbey in the Select Stakes at Wembley providing some reward for a very good year by the Michael Compton trained brindle. Pineapple Lemon had reached a number of finals and broken track records at Sheffield.

== Principal UK races ==
Daily Mirror Grand National, Hall Green (Apr 1, 474m h, £5,000)
Pos	Name of greyhound	Trainer	SP	Time	Trap
1st	Kildare Slippy	Paddy Hancox	1-1f	28.52+	4
2nd	Spot on Spur	Tom Foster	14-1	29.30	3
3rd	Lisnakill Wish	Philip Rees Jr.	5-4	29.52	2
4th	Unbelievable	Linda Mullins	10-1	29.68	6
5th	Greenfield World	Patsy Byrne	14-1	29.70	5
6th	Sha Jen	Stan Kennett	33-1	29.80	1

+Track record

BBC TV Trophy, Belle Vue (Apr 1, 855m, £6,000)
Pos	Name of greyhound	Trainer	SP	Time	Trap
1st	Fortunate Man	Tony Fell	6-4f	55.70	5
2nd	Mobile Magic	John Wileman	14-1	55.71	3
3rd	Bobs Regan	Brian Timcke	9-4	55.81	1
4th	Moon Magic	Richard Steele	8-1	56.25	6
5th	Swiss Trips	A McKenna	12-1	56.29	2
6th	Jennys Wish	Eric Jordan	11-2	56.39	4

Reading Masters, Reading (May 2, 465m, £15,000)
Pos	Name of greyhound	Trainer	SP	Time	Trap
1st	Dempsey Duke	Terry Kibble	9-4	28.09	6
2nd	Deanpark Atom	Tony Meek	5-4f	28.15	1
3rd	Bower Dancer	Tony Meek	14-1	28.33	5
4th	Apres Soleil	Bill Bookle	4-1	28.41	3
5th	Crossford Jumbo	John Copplestone	7-1	28.47	2
6th	Lady Waltham	John Copplestone	12-1	28.67	4

Regal Scottish Derby, Shawfield (May 16, 500m, £20,000)
Pos	Name of greyhound	Trainer	SP	Time	Trap
1st	Glideaway Sam	Michael Compton	25-1	30.26	6
2nd	Polnoon Chief	Frazer Black	6-1	30.36	5
3rd	Ardcaien Slick	G Smith Shaw	25-1	30.44	1
4th	Pineapple Lemon	Michael Compton	2-1	30.74	4
5th	Balligari	Natalie Savva	14-1	30.78	2
6th	Ardfert Mick	Matt O'Donnell	4-5f	00.00	3

Fosters Scurry Gold Cup, Catford (Jul 11, 385m, £2,000)
Pos	Name of greyhound	Trainer	SP	Time	Trap
1st	Glengar Desire	Jimmy Fletcher	5-1	23.96	3
2nd	Kind of Magic	Litzi Miller	6-1	24.00	2
3rd	Super Vara	Ann Finch	7-4f	24.08	6
4th	Glenbaron	Arthur Boyce	7-1	24.12	1
5th	Mags Joy	Pa Fitzgerald	6-1	24.56	4
6th	Spratacus	Peter Rich	9-2	24.74	5

John Humphreys Gold Collar, Catford (Sep 19, 555m, £7,500)
Pos	Name of greyhound	Trainer	SP	Time	Trap
1st	Westmead Suprise	Natalie Savva	6-4	34.75	3
2nd	Westmead Spirit	Natalie Savva	11-10f	34.76	6
3rd	Corrow Flag	John Wileman	14-1	34.80	2
4th	Mauir Joyful	John Gibbons	14-1	34.81	5
5th	Some Whisper	Alf Ellis	16-1	35.35	4
6th	Droopys Charlie	Paddy Milligan	16-1	35.45	1

Fosters Cesarewitch, Belle Vue (Sep 26, 853m, £10,000)
Pos	Name of greyhound	Trainer	SP	Time	Trap
1st	Zap	Alan Honeyfield	12-1	55.44	2
2nd	Westpark Birdie	Ron Barber	4-7f	55.94	6
3rd	Dream of Rosie	D Bennett	10-1	55.95	3
4th	Flower Dale	Edna Armstrong	8-1	56.11	5
5th	Bodies Lisa	Terry Hart	4-1	56.13	1
6th	Colleague	G Corbett	100-1	56.51	4

Laurent-Perrier Grand Prix, Walthamstow (Oct 10, 640m, £7,500)
Pos	Name of greyhound	Trainer	SP	Time	Trap
1st	Westmead Darkie	Natalie Savva	2-1f	39.36	5
2nd	Gortmore Express	Linda Mullins	5-1	39.66	6
3rd	Winsor Abbey	John McGee Sr.	9-4	40.02	3
4th	Celtic Knight	Natalie Savva	20-1	40.05	4
5th	Parquet Pet	Arthur Hitch	11-2	40.39	2
6th	Tomanine Tutu	Ernie Gaskin Sr.	8-1	40.42	1

Ike Morris Laurels, Wimbledon (Oct 17, 460m, £7,500)
Pos	Name of greyhound	Trainer	SP	Time	Trap
1st	Balligari	Natalie Savva	6-4	27.37	2
2nd	Right Move	Natalie Savva	11-10f	27.79	6
3rd	Clifden Airport	Pa Fitzgerald	8-1	27.91	1
4th	Singing Forever	Arthur Hitch	20-1	28.13	4
5th	Fast Soda	Philip Rees Jr.	20-1	28.19	3
6th	Duagh Colours	Tony Meek	10-1	28.31	5

Wendy Fair St Leger, Wembley (Nov 13, 655m, £10,000)
Pos	Name of greyhound	Trainer	SP	Time	Trap
1st	Airmount Flash	Jimmy Gibson	3-1	39.81	1
2nd	Grace Road	Linda Mullins	10-1	40.19	3
3rd	Westmead Darkie	Natalie Savva	7-2	40.29	2
4th	Mountleader Cruz	Norman Johnson	8-1	40.37	4
5th	Lets All Boogie	John Coleman	6-1	40.45	5
6th	Thin Times	Sam Sykes	2-1f	40.53	6

St Marys Hospital Oaks, Wimbledon (Dec 19, 480m, £6,000)
Pos	Name of greyhound	Trainer	SP	Time	Trap
1st	Skelligs Smurf	Bob Gilling	11-8f	29.71	6
2nd	All At Sea	Marlene Westwood	5-2	29.81	1
3rd	Redwood Girl	Ernie Gaskin Sr.	6-1	29.87	3
4th	Bigwood Silver	Philip Rees Jr.	6-1	30.05	2
5th	Knockroe Vixen	Ray Peacock	6-1	30.11	4
6th	Clune Rambler	Kenny Linzell	14-1	30.21	5

== Totalisator returns ==
Extended content

The totalisator returns declared to the National Greyhound Racing Club for the year 1992 are listed below.

Stadium	Turnover £
London (Walthamstow)	13,208,939
London (Wimbledon)	12,312,799
Romford	7,825,337
Birmingham (Hall Green)	5,213,066
London (Catford)	4,979,530
Brighton & Hove	4,920,549
Manchester (Belle Vue)	4,610,715
London (Wembley)	3,455,849
Crayford	3,234,317
Glasgow (Shawfield)	2,920,627
Sunderland	2,392,331
Newcastle (Brough Park)	2,004,705

Stadium	Turnover £
Birmingham (Perry Barr)	1,944,696
Sheffield (Owlerton)	1,942,019
Oxford	1,773,220
Wolverhampton (Monmore)	1,568,938
Yarmouth	1,564,271
Edinburgh (Powderhall)	1,547,600
Reading	1,468,912
Ramsgate	1,428,010
Peterborough	1,418,685
Portsmouth	1,316,072
Bristol	1,109,860
Canterbury	1,094,930

Stadium	Turnover £
Swindon	816,227
Nottingham	795,797
Milton Keynes	768,616
Rye House	672,667
Henlow (Bedfordshire)	523,846
Middlesbrough	518,862
Swaffham	494,050
Norton Canes	439,741
London (Hackney)	427,257
Cradley Heath	408,150
Hull (New Craven Park)	376,730
Mildenhall	268,494
