= Dundalk Ramparts Greyhound Stadium =

Former greyhound racing stadium in County Louth, Ireland

Dundalk Greyhound Stadium
- Interactive map of Dundalk Greyhound Stadium
- Location: Townparks, Dundalk, County Louth, Ireland
- Coordinates: 54°0′8.34″N 6°23′47.99″W
- Opened: 1930
- Closed: 2000

Dundalk Greyhound Stadium also known as the Ramparts was a greyhound racing stadium off Rampart Lane on Townparks, Dundalk, County Louth, Ireland.

== Origins and opening ==
On 18 September 1930, a licence was granted by the Irish Greyhound Racing Association to the Dundealgan Greyhound Racing Company in order to race behind a mechanical lure at the Dundalk Athletic Grounds. A trackless hare was installed and the first race meeting in aid of the County Louth Infirmary took place during October 1930. The venue became known as the Ramparts and was found east of central Dundalk, south of Rampart Lane. Paddy Martin was the founding director and also acted as Racing Manager at the track. Michael Kerley was the first chairman.

In March 1932, Denis McArdle was appointed Racing Manager and the Dundealgan Greyhound Racing Company announced plans to open a new track adjacent to the athletic grounds.

== History ==
Paddy Martin's brother Jimmy took over the reins as Racing Manager in 1957 and in 1965 the company built a new cafe and bar on site and then one year later installed a new lighting system costing £5,000. Also in 1966, the company applied for planning permission for a new stand to be erected. The stand was built at the cost of £35,000 with an 80% grant from the Bord na gCon.

The Dundealgan Greyhound Racing Company decided to introduce a major event to the track in an attempt to attract the open race stars. That event was the Dundalk International and the excellent prize money ensured that entries from the United Kingdom were also received. The first running was in 1968 and won by Not Flashing. The list of winners included many famous greyhounds that included Time Up Please, Ivy Hall Flash, Mutts Silver and Nameless Pixie.

The stadium benefited from considerable investment in 1968, resulting in a new glass fronted grandstand, tote facilities and increased terracing, at the cost of £100,000. The new facilities were opened on Thursday 15 August 1968 by Don Davern (Parliamentary Secretary to the Minister for Agriculture) and the meeting attracted a record attendance.

In 1973, the Irish Greyhound Derby sponsors PJ Carroll Ltd offered a huge single race prize of £1,200 for the Dundalk International event which was won by Bashful Man.

During the 1980s and 1990s the stars continued to grace the track, Rapid Mover, Cooladine Super, Hit the Lid, Adraville Bridge and Farloe Melody (twice) all won the prestigious race.

The track required a facelift and in the early 1990s the situation was addressed. The greyhound management of Jim Martin Jr., Gerry Kerley and Hugh McGahan met with the horse racing management who were also experiencing tough times and they discussed the idea of a merger in late 1996. In 1999 the Dundalk Race Company PLC and Dundealgan Greyhound Racing Company Limited merged to form Dundalk Racing (1999) Ltd. This would allow a new horse racing circuit to be built over the existing turf course and a greyhound track inside the main course.

== Closure ==
The Ramparts was closed on 20 November 2000 during which time the horse racecourse was undergoing major changes. The site today is covered partly by an Aldi and builders merchant next to the Marshes Shopping Centre.

== Competitions ==
- Dundalk International

== Track records ==
Yards	Greyhound	Time	Date	Notes
320	Dark Landing	17.82	12 June 1982	
320	Lough Tan	17.82	14 June 1986	
320	Routhen House	17.78	26 August 1989	
320	Top Marks	17.78		
320	Eden Castle	17.76	15 August 1991	
320	Boyne Walk	17.46	15 August 1993	
325	Mourne Return	17.85	25 July 1958	
350	Boston Heather	18.89	18 April 1970	
435	Farloe Border	24.03	1940	
500	Pointers Prince		1957	
500	Grisette	28.47	13 September 1969	
500	Why Me	28.38	8 August 1974	
500	Mineola Apollo	28.22	23 August 1986	
500	Greenpark Fox	28.12	1988	
500	Angelo Carlotti	28.12		
500	First Officer	28.04	15 August 1990	
525	April Flower	29.38	11 October 1967	
525	Summerhill Flash	29.42	1982	
525	Chief Ironside	29.30	4 August 1984	
525	Hit the Lid	29.28	15 August 1988	
525	Lisglass Lass	29.18	August 1993	Dundalk International
525	Dynamic Fair	=29.16	16 August 1996	Dundalk International
550	Calypso Melody	31.02	28 August 1969	
550	Disco Clare	30.72	15 August 1986	
550	Hit The Heights	30.72	4 August 1987	
550	Silver Ball	30.68	15 August 1988	
700	Twelfth Man	40.20	10 June 1967	
760	Leinster Luck	43.98	23 May 1987	
760	Rush For Silver	43.78	1990	
760	Ratify	43.44	15 August 1993	
765	Quakerfield Boy	44.81	1970	
765	Full Book	44.48	7 August 1971	
325 H	Lovely Munro	19.00	1970	
325 H	Boston Heather	18.89	18 April 1970	
500 H	Tivoli Valley	29.26	17 August 1974	
525 H	Cross Street	31.09	1970	
525 H	Right O'Myross	30.72	9 August 1971	
525 H	Master Bob	30.42	31 July 1982	
550 H	Pick Me	31.90	30 July 1977	
