= Irish Greyhound of the Year Awards =

Greyhound awards

- Lenson Bocko 2019 dog of the year
- Start date: 1965
- Nations: Ireland and Northern Ireland

The Irish Greyhound of the Year Awards are the annual awards for the leading greyhounds in Ireland.

The Greyhound of the Year award was first held in 1965 when it was won by Ballyowen Chief. In 1996 the awards saw the Greyhound of the Year replaced by a Dog and Bitch of the Year Award but in 2013 the Greyhound of the Year award returned in addition to the other awards.

The 2016 awards did not take place until October 2017 following a postponement. Continuing protests by the DGOBA resulted in a suspension of the awards and racing at Shelbourne Park for five months and the cancellation of several major events. The protest was over the February closure of Harold's Cross Stadium.

== Past winners ==
=== Main/Supreme Award ===
Year	Winning Greyhound
1965	Ballyowen Chief
1966	Hairdresser
1967	Yanka Boy
1968	Russian Gun
1969	Own Pride
1970	Mark Anthony
1971	Ivy Hall Flash
1972	Catsrock Daisy
1973	Romping To Work
1974	Lively Band
1975	Ballybeg Prim
1976	Tain Mor
1977	Lindas Champion
1978	Pampered Rover
1979	Nameless Pixie

Year	Winning Greyhound
1980	Indian Joe
1981	Parkdown Jet
1982	Supreme Tiger
1983	I'm Slippy
1984	Morans Beef
1985	Ballintubber One
1986	Storm Villa
1987	Randy
1988	Make History
1989	Manorville Magic
1990	Adraville Bridge
1991	Ardfert Mick
1992	Farloe Melody
1993	Ringa Hustle
1994	Joyful Tidings

Year	Winning Greyhound
1995	Dew Reward
2013	Locnamon Bridie
2014	Laughil Blake
2015	Ballymac Matt
2016	Jaytee Jet
2017	Good News
2018	Ballyanne Sim
2019	Killmacdonagh
2020	Newinn Taylor
2021	Susie Sapphire
2022	Born Warrior
2023	The Other Kobe

=== Dog of the Year ===
Year	Winning Greyhound
1996	Mountleader Peer
1997	Some Picture
1998	Eyeman
1999	Chart King
2000	Judicial Pride
2001	Late Late Show
2002	Bypass Byway
2003	Climate Control
2004	Premier Fantasy
2005	Droopys Maldini
2006	Razldazl Billy

Year	Winning Greyhound
2007	Catunda Harry
2008	Shelbourne Aston
2009	College Causeway
2010	Tyrur McGuigan
2011	Razldazl George
2012	Skywalker Puma
2013	Slippery Robert
2014	Laughil Blake
2015	Ballymac Matt
2016	Jaytee Jet
2017	Good News

Year	Winning Greyhound
2018	Ballyanne Sim
2019	Lenson Bocko
2020	Newinn Taylor
2021	Explosive Boy
2022	Born Warrior
2023	The Other Kobe
2024	Bockos Diamond
2025	

=== Bitch of the Year ===
Year	Winning Greyhound
1996	Tina Marina
1997	Borna Best
1998	April Surprise
1999	Spring Time
2000	Marinas Tina
2001	Marinas Tina
2002	Longvalley Tina
2003	Mustang Mega
2004	Legal Moment
2005	Grayslands Pixie
2006	Shelbourne Becky

Year	Winning Greyhound
2007	Ms Firecracker
2008	Oran Majestic
2009	Skywalker Queen
2010	Dalcash Dvinsky
2011	Droopys Twirl
2012	Milldean Tally
2013	Locnamon Bridie
2014	Velvet All Jam
2015	Ballydoyle Honey
2016	Witches Belle
2017	Forest Natalee

Year	Winning Greyhound
2018	Vancouver
2019	Killmacdonagh
2020	Meenagh Miracle
2021	Susie Sapphire
2022	Raha Mofo
2023	Crafty Shivoo
2024	A Lucky Julie
2025	

=== Sprinter Award ===
Year	Winning Greyhound
2000	Quarter To Five
2001	Fact File
2002	You Said So
2003	Dalcash Black
2004	Sycamore Dan
2005	Mabels Dilemma
2006	Montos Mark
2007	Johnny Gatillo
2008	Almightyjack

Year	Winning Greyhound
2009	Inny Blue
2010	Sheepwalk Mac
2011	Shoemakers Lad
2012	Cambushmore
2013	Knockglass Billy
2014	Crokers Champ
2015	Catherines Drico
2016	Ballymac Bigmike
2017	Butterbridge Bex

Year	Winning Greyhound
2018	Ardnasool Jet
2019	Ardnasool Jet
2020	Grangeview Ten
2021	Good Cody
2022	Gizmo Cash
2023	Carrick Aldo
2024	Broadstrand Syd
2025	

=== Stayer Award ===
Year	Winning Greyhound
2000	Knockeevan Jerry
2001	Making Merry
2002	Mega Delight
2003	Shelbourne Star
2004	Airforce Honcho
2005	De Eight Wonder
2006	Sonatina
2007	Droopys Ike
2008	Olympic Show

Year	Winning Greyhound
2009	Corporate Attack
2010	Kiltrea Kev
2011	Ceroc Shaneboy
2012	Future Boy
2013	Shanless Becky
2014	Sidarian Lisa
2015	Tradition
2016	Airmount Tess
2017	Airmount Tess

Year	Winning Greyhound
2018	Javielenko
2019	Redzer Ardfert
2020	Ballymac Kingdom
2021	Dana Point
2022	Crafty Kokoro
2023	Kinturk Road
2024	Tuono Charlie
2025	

=== Brood Bitch ===
Year	Winning Greyhound
1996	Minnies Nikita
1997	Spring Season
1998	Ladys Guest
1999	Centenarys Dream
2000	Dons Pride
2001	Perrys Pusher
2002	Daleys Heartrob
2003	Droopys Kristin
2004	Newbridge Girl
2005	Little Diamond UK
2006	Airport Express

Year	Winning Greyhound
2007	Airport Express
2008	Queen Survivor
2009	Maybe Baby
2010	Tyrur Temptress
2011	Razldazl Pearl
2012	Talita Beaity
2013	Locnamon Nell
2014	Laughil Lass
2015	Kildallon Maid
2016	Ballymac Scarlet
2017	Droopys Hilda

Year	Winning Greyhound
2018	Global Liberty
2019	Portumna West
2020	Coolavanny Pet
2021	Jetstream Lynx
2022	Mountaylor Queen
2023	Mountaylor Queen
2024	Seaglass Shadow
2025	

=== Stud Dog ===
Year	Winning Greyhound
2011	Head Bound
2012	Head Bound
2013	Head Bound
2014	Kinloch Brae
2015	Kinloch Brae
2016	Droopys Scolari

Year	Winning Greyhound
2017	Droopys Scolari
2018	Kinloch Brae
2019	Droopys Jet
2020	Droopys Jet
2021	Droopys Sydney
2022	Droopys Sydney

Year	Winning Greyhound
2023	Droopys Sydney
2024	Droopys Sydney
2025	

== See also ==
Greyhound of the Year Awards
