= 1991 UK & Ireland Greyhound Racing Year =

UK greyhound racing year

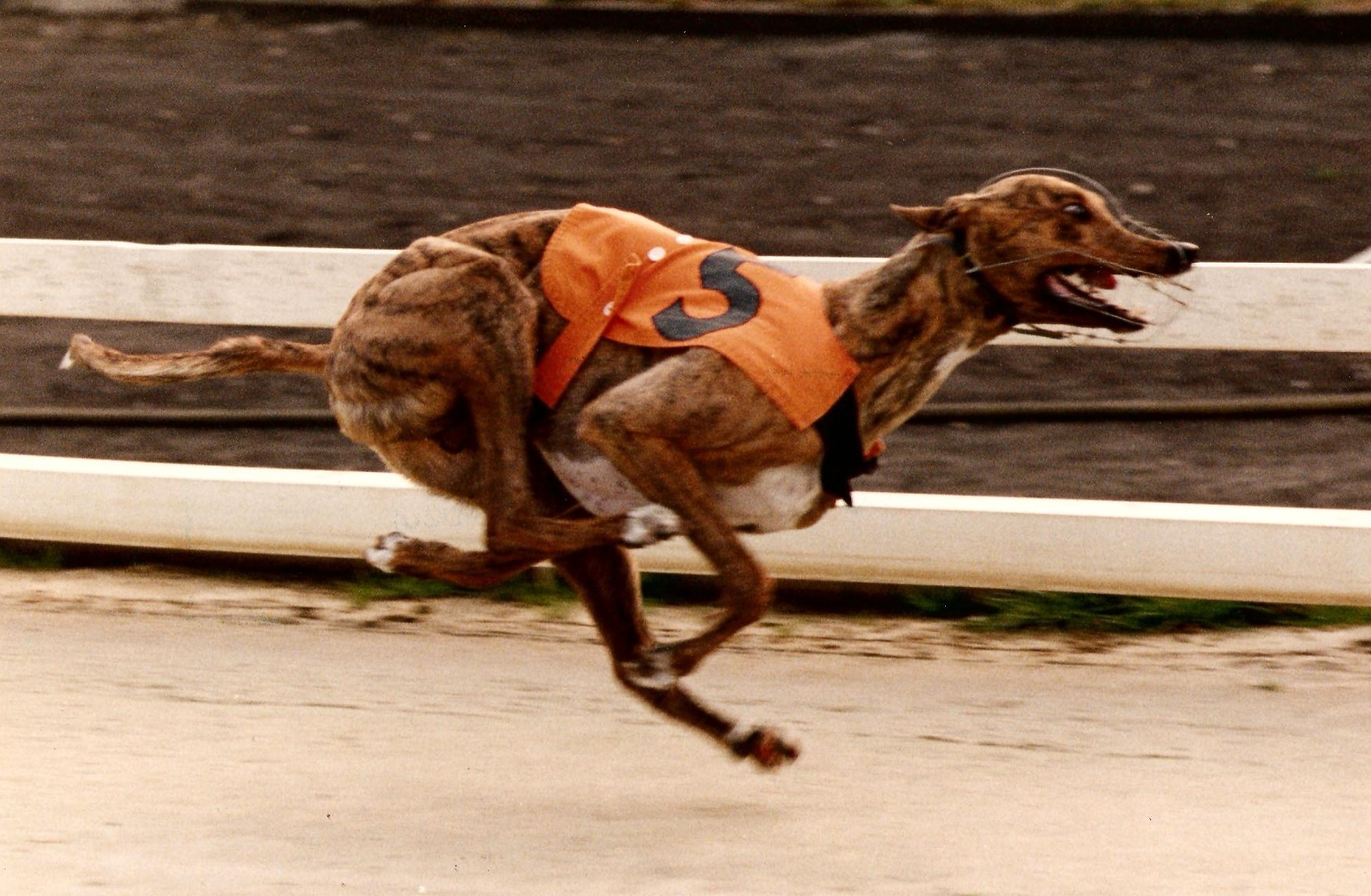
- Ravage Again, 29 consecutive wins

The 1991 UK & Ireland Greyhound Racing Year was the 66th year of greyhound racing in the United Kingdom and the 65th year of greyhound racing in Ireland.

== Roll of honour ==
Major Winners
Award	Name of Winner
1991 English Greyhound Derby	Ballinderry Ash
1991 Irish Greyhound Derby	Ardfert Mick
1991 Scottish Greyhound Derby	Phantom Flash
Greyhound Trainer of the Year	John McGee Sr.
Greyhound of the Year	Bobs Regan
Irish Greyhound of the Year	Ardfert Mick
Trainers Championship	Linda Mullins

== Summary ==
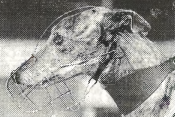
Laurels finalist Crossford Jumbo

The National Greyhound Racing Club (NGRC) released the annual returns, with totalisator turnover at £97,311,283 and attendances recorded at 3,979,090 from 6051 meetings. Track tote deduction remained at 17.5%.

An industry discussion concluded that a greyhound's career longevity was reduced by two breeding factors. The first factor being the fact that breeding was predominantly conducted between the fastest middles distance stars and therefore increasing the average speed (bringing higher injury rates) and eliminating the stamina of stayers and marathon greyhounds. The second factor was the lack of coursing bloodlines, thereby reducing the durability traits. The physical difference between a 1930s and 1990s greyhound was significant and despite advancement in track preparation the track layouts remained the same.

Bobs Regan trained by Brian Timcke was voted Greyhound of the Year after winning the Golden Jacket, the Kent St Leger and the Regency. Ardfert Mick was voted Irish Greyhound of the Year after winning the 1991 Irish Greyhound Derby. John McGee won the Greyhound Trainer of the Year for the fourth successive year, a new record beating the three won by George Curtis and Phil Rees Sr. McGee notched over 200 winners during the year.

Ravage Again won his 29th successive race at Sunderland but then on 26 January at Powderhall at odds of 2-9 he stumbled out of the boxes and found trouble, failing to catch the winner Base Rate. The world record attempt was over and he was immediately retired.

== Tracks ==
A & S Leisure (owners of five casino restaurants) purchased Sheffield and spent £3 million on refurbishment. Ramsgate secured a BAGS contract with Mick Wheble installed as the new Group Racing Manager. Stuart Netting became Ramsgate Racing Manager in place of Jeff Jefcoate. Mildenhall Stadium started racing for the first time.

Brent Walker the owners of William Hill and Hackney Wick Stadium were in a precarious position in regard to gigantic debts, which brought an uncertain future for both. In a statement to a committee of MP's, BAGS representative Tom Kelly reveals that Hackney (and other tracks) are only paid a £900 broadcasting fee for a ten race BAGS meeting that produces a £2 million turnover (£200,000 per race) for BAGS. Tory MP David Sumberg says "This £900 bugs me, it is so small"; Kelly is unconcerned by the disparity and financial difficulties of tracks and responds by saying that "the tracks must be satisfied because they apply for contracts". Over the next decade tracks will close at an alarming rate, including Hackney six years later.

== Competitions ==
The Scottish Greyhound Derby increased prize money from £10,000 to £15,000 and was won by Phantom Flash trained by Nick Savva; the black dog had a great 1990 winning the Sussex Cup and Breeders Forum and was unlucky not to win the Irish Derby. He would later leave Savva to join trainer Patsy Byrne following a disagreement with owner Dave Hawley.

The Grand National final at Hall Green produced a memorable race after a dead heat by Ideal Man and Ballycarney Dell, the pair finished just ahead of Run On King and a promising hurdler called Kildare Slippy. Dempseys Whisper continued his good ways when becoming only the second greyhound to successfully defend the Grand Prix title at Walthamstow Stadium.

== News ==
Tom Smith the owner of Swaffham investigates some of the track trainers kennels and finds unlicensed handlers and greyhounds missing from the establishments that they are supposed to be kennelled at, which leads to the NGRC being called in to hold a series of inquiries.

Patsy Byrne joined Wimbledon as a trainer and sponsors the International while Maggie Lucas leaves Hackney for Romford. The Mullins family split camp as Linda Mullins’s son David takes out his first trainers licence at Sunderland. Sunderland had only returned to NGRC rules in 1990 were improving their profile by taking on Mullins and former top flapping man Ted Soppitt, in addition Harry Williams who was responsible for getting the new Sunderland of the ground started training again. There were two major trainer changes towards the latter part of the year both involving Walthamstow, Linda Mullins was recruited from Romford to increase Walthamstow's recent policy of bringing in leading open race trainers. As a consequence Walthamstow's top man Kenny Linzell left to join Romford after being unhappy with the new policy. Former English and Irish Derby winning trainer John Bassett died in March aged 81.

Wheres The Limo trained by Linda Mullins won 28 from 45 starts to be leading open race winner.

An ITV production called Gone to the Dogs filmed at Walthamstow and starring Jim Broadbent, Martin Clunes, Harry Enfield, Alison Steadman and Sheila Hancock is a success after viewing figures of nine million.

== Principal UK races ==
Daily Mirror/Sporting Life Grand National, Hall Green (Apr 3, 474m h, £5,000)
Pos	Name of Greyhound	Trainer	SP	Time	Trap
1st	Ideal Man (dh)	John McGee Sr.	3-1jf	29.81	1
1st	Ballycarney Dell (dh)	Tony Gifkins	14-1	29.81	3
3rd	Run on King	Linda Mullins	7-2	29.83	2
4th	Kildare Slippy	Paddy Hancox	7-2	29.86	4
5th	Herbie Lambug	Mick Puzey	3-1jf	29.98	6
6th	Gizmo Pasha	Linda Mullins	9-1	30.38	5

dh=dead heat

BBC TV Trophy, Monmore (815m, £6,000)
Pos	Name of Greyhound	Trainer	SP	Time	Trap
1st	Jennys Wish	Eric Jordan	12-1	52.44	
2nd	Catsrock Dan	George Lynds	1-3f	52.66	
3rd	Colleague	G Corbett		52.72	
4th	Sir Alva	Nick Savva		53.00	
5th	Bobs Regan	Brian Timcke		53.01	
6th	Poor Annie	Stan Kennett		53.04	

Regal Scottish Derby, Shawfield (May 11, 500m, £15,000)
Pos	Name of Greyhound	Trainer	SP	Time	Trap
1st	Phantom Flash	Patsy Byrne	1-4f	29.77	6
2nd	Ballycarney Dave	M Bell	20-1	30.25	2
3rd	Woodhill Echo	Dawn Milligan	7-1	30.47	5
4th	Strange Twist	Gordon Rooks	33-1	30.53	4
5th	Hopeful Billy	Matt O'Sullivan	33-1	30.54	3
6th	Sheer Elegance	J Mominimee	10-1	30.55	1

David Richardson Scurry Cup, Catford (Jul 13, 385m, £6,000)
Pos	Name of Greyhound	Trainer	SP	Time	Trap
1st	Portun Flier	Paddy Milligan	2-1f	23.43	4
2nd	Killouragh Katie	Paddy Milligan	5-1	23.69	2
3rd	Bolt Home	Ernie Gaskin Sr.	14-1	23.75	3
4th	Mandies Supreme	Derek Tidswell	5-2	23.91	1
5th	Ritas Wish	John McGee Sr.	12-1	24.97	5
6th	Pretty Supreme		7-1	25.15	6

John Humphreys Gold Collar, Catford (Sep 21, 555m, £7,500)
Pos	Name of Greyhound	Trainer	SP	Time	Trap
1st	Appleby Lisa	Harry Dodds	5-1	34.67	3
2nd	Pams Ace	Jim Reynolds	14-1	34.77	1
3rd	Simple Trend	John McGee Sr.	9-2	35.07	5
4th	Sail Over	Sam Sykes	5-4f	35.21	2
5th	Timmys Hobby	Chris Duggan	8-1	35.22	4
6th	Springville Pam	John Coleman	4-1	00.00	6

Websters Yorkshire Bitter Cesarewitch, Belle Vue (Sep 28, 853m, £5,000)
Pos	Name of Greyhound	Trainer	SP	Time	Trap
1st	Wayzgoose	Dick Hawkes	20-1	55.30	6
2nd	Red Arrow Lady	Nigel Saunders	8-1	56.10	5
3rd	Bobs Regan	Brian Timcke	5-4f	56.18	1
4th	Easy Bimbo	Trevor Cobbold	3-1	56.19	2
5th	Westbrook Penny	John Coulter	14-1	56.27	4
6th	Carlsberg Champ	Barry Silkman	5-1	56.49	3

Laurent-Perrier Grand Prix, Walthamstow (Oct 12, 640m, £7,500)
Pos	Name of Greyhound	Trainer	SP	Time	Trap
1st	Dempseys Whisper	Patsy Byrne	2-1f	39.20	6
2nd	Appleby Lisa	Harry Dodds	10-1	39.58	2
3rd	Coalbrook Suzie	Tony Meek	40-1	39.68	3
4th	Parquet Pet	Arthur Hitch	11-4	39.76	4
5th	Bracklyn Spark	Theo Mentzis	7-2	39.86	1
6th	Cheeky Bubbles	Garry Irving	9-2	39.89	5

Oaks, Wimbledon (Oct 26, 480m, £6,000)
Pos	Name of Greyhound	Trainer	SP	Time	Trap
1st	Simple Trend	Ernie Gaskin Sr.	2-1f	29.06	1
2nd	Curraduff Jill	Vicky Holloway	3-1	29.14	4
3rd	Westmead Surprise	Natalie Savva	3-1	29.30	6
4th	Ballintee Lass	Philip Rees Jr.	10-1	29.31	2
5th	Coalbrook Suzie	Tony Meek	10-1	29.37	5
6th	Tubercurry Vixen	C Walker	20-1	29.59	3

St Leger, Wembley (Nov 15, 655m, £10,000)
Pos	Name of Greyhound	Trainer	SP	Time	Trap
1st	Temps Perdu	Albert Hill	9-4jf	40.18	1
2nd	Bobs Regan	Brian Timcke	4-1	40.19	5
3rd	Nickel Coin	Rita Summers	9-2	40.23	3
4th	Salisbury	Arthur Hitch	20-1	40.51	2
5th	Fawn Pearl	Terry Kibble	16-1	40.59	4
6th	Snow Shoes	John McGee Sr.	9-4jf	40.65	6

Laurels, Wimbledon (Dec 26, 460m, £7,500)
Pos	Name of Greyhound	Trainer	SP	Time	Trap
1st	Glengar Ranger	Jimmy Fletcher	6-4f	27.47	4
2nd	Supporting Cast	John Faint	3-1	28.23	2
3rd	Crossford Jumbo	John Copplestone	20-1	28.26	3
4th	Hi Roger	Patsy Byrne	9-4	28.40	6
5th	Drumgower Swank	Barry Silkman	33-1	28.80	5
6th	Pennys Best	Pat Cusack	6-1	29.18	1

=== Principal Irish finals ===
Burmah Castrol Puppy Derby Harold's Cross (Oct 11, 525y, £7,000)
Pos	Name of Greyhound	SP	Time	Trap
1st	Polnoon Chief (Fraser Black)	3-1	29.98	5
2nd	Early Potter (Michael Enright)	4-1	30.05	4
3rd	Barneys Alarm (Mary Graham)	2-1f	30.19	6
4th	Jamie Icy Star (Aidan Tynan)	16-1		3
5th	Jamie Icy Wind (Aidan Tynan)	20-1		2
6th	Ballyard Champ (Michael Enright)	7-2		1

== Totalisator returns ==
Extended content

The totalisator returns declared to the National Greyhound Racing Club for the year 1991 are listed below.

Stadium	Turnover £
London (Wimbledon)	13,813,679
London (Walthamstow)	13,398,416
Romford	7,967,785
Brighton & Hove	6,064,602
London (Catford)	5,468,360
Birmingham (Hall Green)	5,252,914
London (Wembley)	4,578,369
Manchester (Belle Vue)	4,514,485
Crayford	3,393,219
Glasgow (Shawfield)	3,067,291
Sunderland	2,215,727
Oxford	2,046,684
Edinburgh (Powderhall)	1,834,272

Stadium	Turnover £
Sheffield (Owlerton)	1,829,080
Newcastle (Brough Park)	1,763,071
Birmingham (Perry Barr)	1,725,914
Ramsgate	1,669,956
Wolverhampton (Monmore)	1,662,848
Yarmouth	1,636,821
Portsmouth	1,512,823
Canterbury	1,478,918
Reading	1,466,782
Peterborough	1,095,297
Bristol	923,143
Milton Keynes	872,100
Rye House	790,479

Stadium	Turnover £
Nottingham	774,826
Swindon	741,366
Henlow (Bedfordshire)	662,899
London (Hackney)	575,775
Hull (New Craven Park)	528,909
Middlesbrough	517,125
Swaffham	476,184
Norton Canes	467,527
Cradley Heath	405,775
Mildenhall	88,554
Wisbech	30,000
