= Easter Cup (greyhounds) =

Irish greyhound racing competition

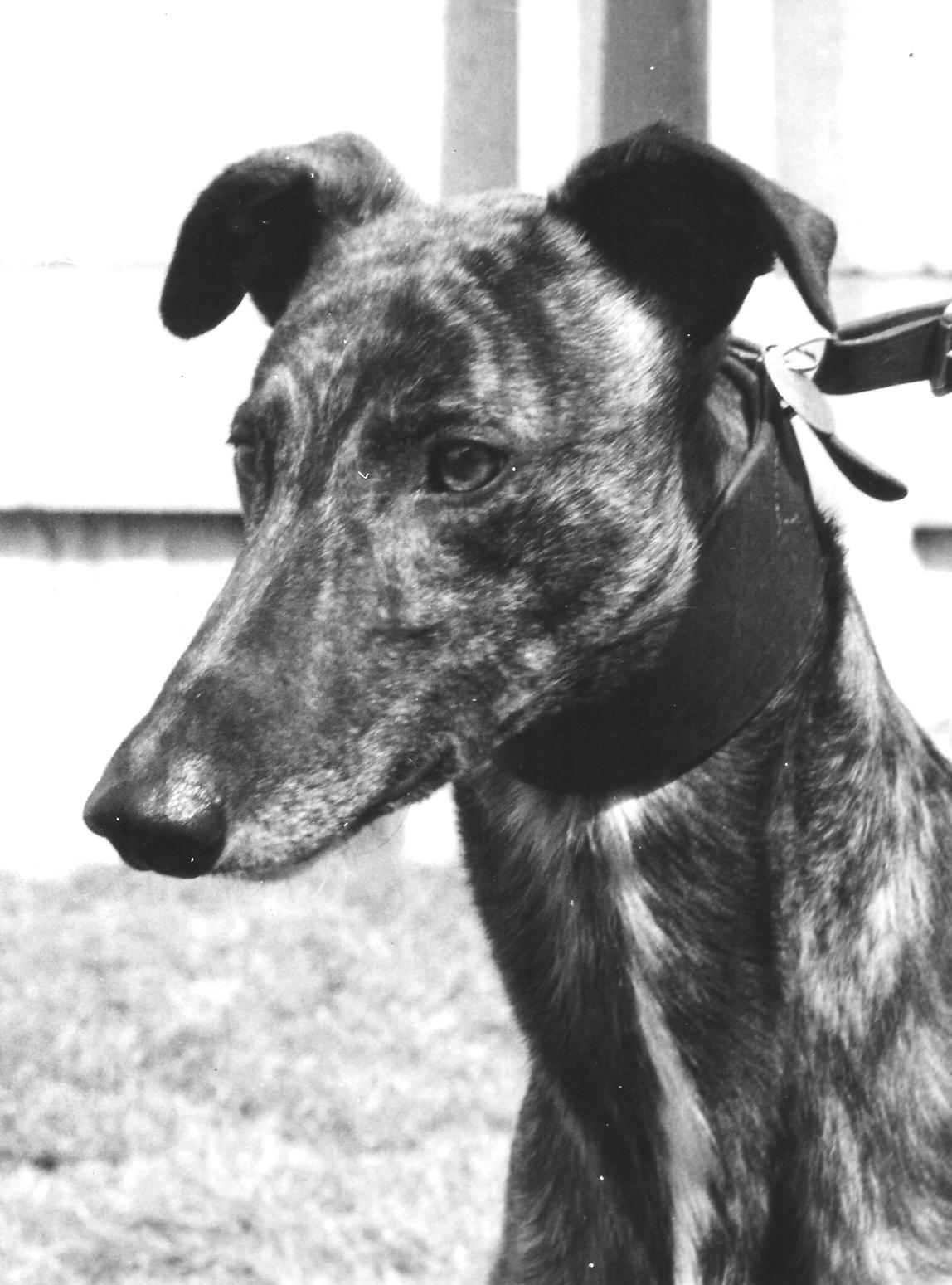
- 1971 champion Postal Vote
- Class: Feature
- Location: Shelbourne Park
- Inaugurated: 1928
- Sponsor: Bresbet

Race information
- Distance: 550 yards
- Surface: Sand
- Purse: €25,000 (winner)

The Easter Cup is a greyhound racing competition held annually at Shelbourne Park in Dublin.

It was inaugurated in 1928.

The event was won by the great Spanish Battleship on twice in 1954 and 1955.

In 2017 the event was postponed following protests by the DGOBA which resulted in a suspension of racing at Shelbourne Park for five months. The protest was over the February closure of Harold's Cross Stadium. The 2020 edition was behind closed doors because of the COVID-19 pandemic.

== Venues and distances ==
- 1928–2007 (Shelbourne Park 525y)
- 2008–present (Shelbourne Park 550y)
- 2017 (not held)

== Sponsors ==
- 1986–1986 (Cooladine Super)
- 1993–1996 (Daniel J Reilly)
- 2004–2007 (Donal Reilly)
- 2009–2009 (BCR Print Management)
- 2010–2013 (College Causeway/Killahan Phanter)
- 2014–2015 (Dandelion Bar & Nightclub)
- 2016–2021 (Ladbrokes)
- 2022–present (Bresbet)

== Past winners ==
Year	Winner	Breeding	Time (sec)	SP	Trainer	Notes/ref
1928	Odd Blade	Hidden Joke - Chordstriker	30.64	1/2f	T. O'Brien	
1929	Odd Blade	Hidden Joke - Chordstriker	30.71	4/1	T. O'Brien	
1930	Hanna's Pup	Guiding Hand – Ocean Haze	30.59		J. McCarthy	
1931	Lion's Share	Lenin – Saucy Nell	30.71		Edward Lyng	
1932	Monologue	Mutton Cutlet - High Force	30.78	5/2	Luke Maher	
1933	Rustic Martin	Real Rustic - Martive	30.59			
1934	Brilliant Bob	Other Days – Birchfield Bessie	30.29		Michael Brennan	
1935	Khun Khan	Roast Rib – Kilgarriffe Pride	30.54			
1936	Mooncoin Captain	Mutton Cutlet – Treaty Bound	30.54	10/1	R. Moore	
1937	Cardinal Puff	Gaelic Rover – Cross Counter	30.50			
1938	Pagan Miller	Meadow Fescue – Breffini Molly	30.27			
1939	Abbeylara	Prudent Turn – That's The Why	30.27		T. Black	
1940	Shy Sandy	White Sandhills – Sheevra More	30.34			
1941	Prince Norroy	Castledown Lad – Ruddy Mutton	30.32			
1942	Wayside Clover	Gale Side Sliver – Slaney Beauty	30.39			
1943	Monarch of the Glen	Carolina Prince – Turn of the Glen	30.43			
1944	Empor Lassie	Castledown Lad – Signal Post	30.35			
1945	Astra	Tanist – Mad Darkie	29.86			
1946	Astra	Tanist – Mad Darkie	30.40			
1947	Patsys Record	Patsy Bogoak – Sunmount View	30.15		Jack Davis	
1948	Castlecoman	Mad Tanist – Smartly There	29.90			
1949	Flashy Prince	Glenview Shaggy – Spa Cherry	29.85			
1950	Sandown Champion	Mad Tanist – Good Record	29.85			
1951	Clogher McGrath	Tanist – Clogher Cross	30.03			
1952	Wee Chap	Mad Fair – Laveybeg	30.12			
1954	Spanish Battleship	Spanish Chestnut – Ballyseedy Memory	30.17		Tom Lynch	
1955	Spanish Battleship	Spanish Chestnut – Ballyseedy Memory	29.72		Tom Lynch	
1956	Baytown Duel	Ollys Pal – Baytown Brunette	29.67			
1957	Doon Marshall	Hurry Abdul – Dooniskey Lass	30.41			
1958	Sharavogue	Ballinclea Dancer – Deuce of Diamonds	29.96			
1959	War Dance	The Grand Champion – Witching Dancer	29.76			
1960	Springvalley Grand	The Grand Champion – Springvalley Lady	29.92			
1961	Tinys Trousseau	The Grand Fire – Kilcomney Tiny	29.66			
1962	The Grand Canal	Champion Prince – The Grand Duchess	29.93		Paddy Dunphy	
1963	General Courtnowski	Man of Pleasure - Yoblstrap	29.98			
1964	Ballet Dante	Romolas Dante – Havana Miss	30.27		M Kirwan	
1965	The Grand Time	Hi There – The Grand Duchess	29.50			
1966	Clomoney Grand	The Grand Fire – Last Landing	29.50			
1967	Tinys Tidy Town	Mothel Chief – Kitty's Fire	29.59			
1968	It's A Mint	Prairie Flash – Cranog Bet	29.63		Leslie McNair	
1969	Move Gas	Dandy Man – Move Sally	30.29		Ger McKenna	
1970	Monalee Gambler	Prairie Flash – Sheila At Last	29.52			
1971	Postal Vote	Dusty Trail – Paddistarr	29.36		Gay McKenna	
1972	Catsrock Daisy	Fantastic Prince – Truly Silver	29.01		Sammy Easton	
1973	Newpark Arkle	Monalee Arkle – Little Playgirl	29.40			
1974	Aqueduct Rosie	Myross Again – Monalee Leader	29.52			
1975	Tantallons Flyer	Monalee Champion – Jaime Wonder	29.60			
1976	Cindys Spec	Spectre II – Cyndys Hope	29.20			
1977	Weigh In First	Ritas Choice – Silent Treatment	29.58			
1978	Rokeel Light	Yanka Boy – Rokeel Rebel	29.50			
1979	Shady Bunch	Bright Lad – Shady Primrose	29.42			
1980	Indian Joe	Brave Bran – Minnatonka	29.16		John Hayes	
1981	Murrays Mixture	Brush Tim – Stylish Heather	29.15		Francie Murray	
1982	Speedy Wonder	Shamrock Sailor – Queen of Moray	29.40			
1983	Wicklow Sands	Sand Man – Smart Spy	29.64			
1984	Spartacus	Knockrour Slave – I'm A Star	29.22		Matt O'Donnell	
1985	Oran Express	Oran Jack – Thank You Ken	29.67		Bill O'Hare	
1986	Baby Doll	Lindas Champion – Sineads Zest	29.37	5/2jf	Michael Ferncombe	
1987	Spartafitz	Spartacus – Cobbling Rose	29.36		Matt O'Donnell	
1988	Joannes Nine	Lindas Champion – Emohruo	29.65		Fraser Black	
1989	Annagh Bar	Cronins Bar – Thoor Ballylee	29.61		Gerry Duffin	
1990	Lassana Champ	Sail On II – Moneypoint Peg	29.34		Matt O'Donnell	
1991	Farloe Melody	Lodge Prince – Chini Chin Chin	29.53		Matt O'Donnell	
1992	Farloe Melody	Lodge Prince – Chini Chin Chin	28.93		Matt O'Donnell	
1993	Jacks Well	Kyle Jack – What If	29.54		O'Neill	
1994	Valais Express	Daleys Gold – Carrick Express	29.13		Mary Delmer	
1995	Lacken Prince	Live Contender – Afternoon Blue	29.38		John McGee	
1996	Ballyduag Manx	Manx Treasure – Strange Manner	29.23	9/2		
1997	Park Jewel	Park Minister – Rantogue Queen	29.27	3/1	PJ Fahy	
1998	Mr Pickwick	Trade Union – Terrys Whisper	28.91	1/1f	Paul Hennessy	
1999	Chart King	Trade Official - Clarinka Sand	28.40	5/4f	Ralph Hewitt	Track record
2000	Mr Bozz	Cry Dalcash – Terrys Whisper	28.94	7/4f	Paul Hennessy	
2001	Late Late Show	Spiral Nikita – Ullid Nitrate	28.60	9/10f	Paul Hennessy	
2002	Late Late Show	Spiral Nikita – Ullid Nitrate	28.74	4/9f	Paul Hennessy	
2003	Mobhi Gamble	Spiral Nikita – Chica Chuita	28.47	4/1	Larry Dunne	
2004	Premier Fantasy	Premier County – Nifty Niamh	28.08	4/9f	Seamus Graham	Track record
2005	Mineola Farloe	Top Honcho - Farloe Dingo	28.39	6/1	Seamus Graham	
2006	Ahane Lad	Larkhill Jo – Daffodil Dance	28.21	5/2	Owen McKenna	
2007	Ardkill Jamie	Top Savings – Fast Issue	28.30	4/1	Paul Hennessy	
2008	Tyrur Kenny	Top Honcho – Tyrur Pearl	29.91	2/1	Paul Hennessy	
2009	Droopys Noel	Westmead Hawk – Drive On Buzz	29.91	6/1	Pat Buckley	
2010	Thurlesbeg Joker	Head Bound – Free To Air	29.55	6/4f	Owen McKenna	
2011	Makeshift	Razldazl Billy – Razldazl Pearl	29.59	2/1f	Dolores Ruth	
2012	Tyrur Big Mike	Brett Lee – Tyrur Temptress	29.73	2/1f	Conor Fahy	
2013	North Bound	Head Bound – No Joke Sherry	29.46	4/1	Niall Dunne	
2014	Skywalker Farloe	Skywalker Ace – Final Orchid	29.63	2/1	Frances O'Donnell	
2015	Sidarian Blaze	Kinloch Brae – Silverhill Tina	29.52	6/4	Graham Holland	
2016	Jaytee Jet	Droopys Scolari – Chin Gach Gook	29.45	6/4f	Paul Hennessy	
2018	Colarhouse Gerry	Head Bound – Thongue Hope	29.56	9/2	Owen McKenna	
2019	Clona Blaze	Laughil Blake – Coolavanny Pearl	29.37	5/2f	Graham Holland	
2020	Wolfe	Tyrur Big Mike – Jalingo	29.89	6/4f	Graham Holland	
2021	Knocknaboul Syd	Droopys Sydney – Knocknaboulmadam	29.58	11/4	Pat Buckley	
2022	Susie Sapphire	Droopys Jet – Jetstream Lynx	29.48	1/3f	Owen McKenna	
2023	Swords Rex	Droopys Sydney – Starry Display	29.71	11/8f	Graham Holland	
2024	Clonbrien Treaty	Pestana – Clonbrien Millie	29.77	4/1	Graham Holland	
2025	Hopes Teddy	Confient Rankin – Dolls Lady	29.81	13/8f	Pat Buckley	
