= Swaffham Raceway =

Motorsport racing track in Norfolk, UK

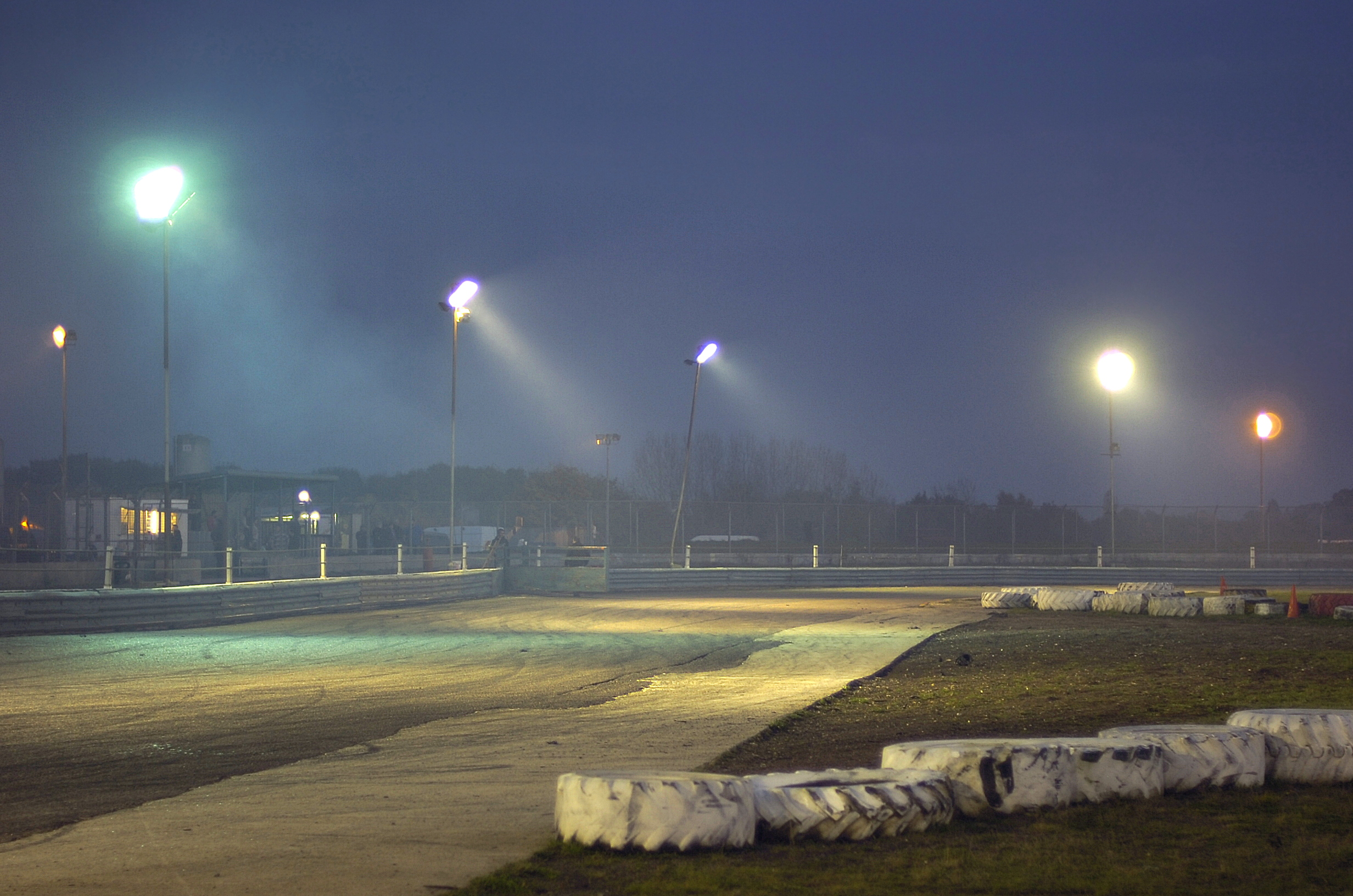
- Swaffham Raceway under floodlights, 2016
- Location: Dereham Road, Swaffham, Norfolk
- Coordinates: 52°39′17.41″N 0°37′51.52″E
- Capacity: 3000
- Opened: 1975
- Former names: Swaffham Stadium
- Length: 0.205 miles (0.329 km)

Swaffham Raceway, originally Swaffham Stadium, is a stock car and banger racing circuit in Swaffham, Norfolk, which also hosted greyhound racing from 1987 until 2000.

== Greyhound racing ==
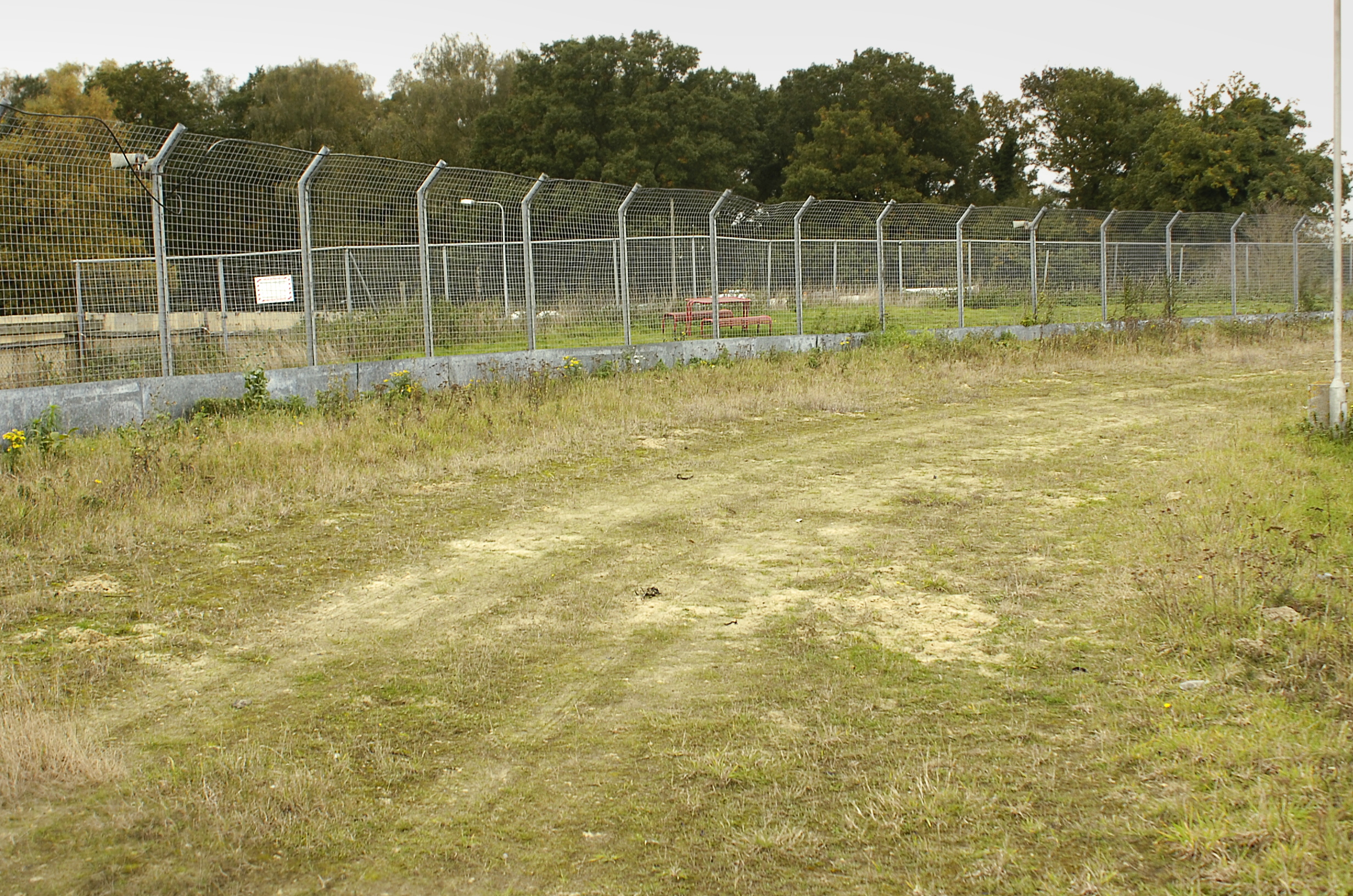
Disused greyhound track at Swaffham, which borders the active oval motorsport track.

Swaffham became a new track on the National Greyhound Racing Club permit scheme in 1987. The 416 circumference circuit was constructed just south of the Dereham Road on the east side of Broom Covert. The track location was remote and relied on the catchment area of the market town of Swaffham to the west and some clientele from the further afield Kings Lynn and Norwich. It ran parallel to the closed Great Eastern Railway Lynn & Dereham line which ran through an area that separated the track from NRM horticulture laboratories.

Maurice and Anne Kirby opened the track to the public on 16 November 1987, with Maurice Kirby acting as the Racing Manager on the race nights of Monday, Wednesday and Friday. Distances were 270, 480, 686 & 896 metres behind an 'Outside Sumner' hare. There was a large car park, 72 kennels and ten on course bookmakers but limited facilities in terms of structures with just one main stand.

Because of a lack of greyhound racing in the area, Swaffham attracted significant trainers such as Kevin Cobbold, John McGee and Ken Peckham.

In 1989 Tom Smith was brought into the track as the new General and Racing Manager and by 1992 he had acquired the lease. Together with his son Gavin they were always looking to improve the mechanical workings of greyhound racing from hare systems to drainage and they produced a new hare that would change the industry. They came up with a hare that was modelled on the older outside 'McKee-Scott' but it had modifications that allowed the hare driver to use a simple turn switch and then an even simpler hare rail at ground level with the wire running on pulleys underneath. Within a ten-year period the popular 'Outside Sumner' and older 'Outside McKee' had all but disappeared within the industry. The hare was known as the 'Swaffham' and this allowed the Smiths to set up a very successful greyhound parts company.

A dispute over security of tenure led to the cessation of greyhound racing at Swaffham on 14 July 2000. Kirby planned to reintroduce greyhounds in 2007 after spending £60,000 on a new greyhound track but Kirby died in 2012.

=== Track records ===
Distance metres	Greyhound	Time	Date
270	Glengiblin Rover	16.77	25.03.1988
270	Surge Home	16.44	12.09.1988
270	Curryhills Mike	16.32	02.12.1991
270	Hot Hot	16.31	14.09.1993
418	Killee Stranger	25.50	31.03.1989
440	Hairy Head	27.02	06.03.2000
440	Dims Favourite	26.85	24.04.1990
480	Hit The Lid	29.32	29.08.1988
620	Tarnwood Emperor	38.37	28.11.1989
686	Denes Mutt	40.59	25.03.1988
686	Allglaze Dixon	43.35	31.10.1988
686	Decoy Cheetah	43.55	22.11.1994
834	Mullawn Rip	54.22	13.02.1990
856	Paradise Ash	55.73	02.12.1991
856	Barefoot Queen	55.50	24.05.1993
1102	Stir About Biddy	74.03	20.06.1992
270 H	Ashgrove Gift	16.97	29.10.1991
480 H	Run On King	30.24	02.12.1991

== Today ==
Stock cars still take place today. In 2018 former Rye House Stadium promoter Eddie Lesley announced his plans to revamp the site; one of his companies owns the site outright and there are plans for a schooling track.
