= Matt O'Donnell (greyhound trainer) =

Irish greyhound racing professional trainer (1933-2016)

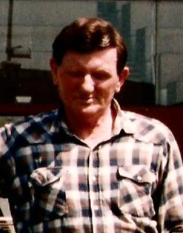

Personal information
- Born: 23 June 1933 Tipperary, Ireland
- Died: 4 January 2016 (aged 83) Tipperary, Ireland
- Occupation: Greyhound trainer

Sport
- Sport: Greyhound racing

Achievements and titles
- National finals: Classic/Feature wins: English Derby (1992); Irish Derby (1990, 1991, 1995); Classic/Feature wins: Easter Cup (1984, 1987, 1990,1991,1992); Champion Stakes (1986, 1991); St Leger (1978, 1982, 1985, 1986, 1989, 1992, 1995); Grand National (1979); Cesarewitch (1994); Produce (1978, 1985, 1989); Oaks (1987)

Matthew "Matt" John O'Donnell (23 June 1933 – 4 January 2016) was an Irish greyhound trainer. He is a three-time winner of the Irish Greyhound Derby and one-time winner of the English Greyhound Derby and is regarded as one of Ireland's all-time leading trainers.

== Career ==
O'Donnell started training in 1968 and first came to prominence in the late 1970s with 'Malange', reaching the 1978 St Leger final at Wembley and winning the 1978 Irish St Leger at Limerick.

After twelve years of success, he finally won the Irish Derby with The Other Toss in 1990. O'Donnell successfully defended the title in 1991 with Ardfert Mick and joined the exclusive group of English/Irish Derby winning trainers with Farloe Melody in 1992. In 1995 he won a third Irish Derby.

He was based in Killenaule, County Tipperary, and amassed 22 Classic winners. After retiring from training he assisted his wife Frances, who took over the licence; in 2012 she won the Irish Derby.

== Personal life ==
Before he trained greyhounds he owned a milk delivery business and a haulage firm. He married Frances Ruth (sister of another leading training Dolores Ruth), both Frances and Dolores are daughters of another trainer John Ruth who died in 1993.

O'Donnell died on 4 January 2016.
