= Champion Hurdle (greyhounds) =

Former greyhound racing competition in England

- Class: Category 1
- Location: (Wimbledon 1990–2016) (Towcester 2017–2018); Central Park (2019–2022); Crayford (2023–2024)
- Inaugurated: 1990
- Final run: 2024

Race information
- Surface: Sand

The Champion Hurdle was a greyhound racing competition held annually. Until 2017 it was held at Wimbledon Stadium but switched to Towcester Greyhound Stadium following the closure of Wimbledon.

The event previously culminated on the same evening of the English Greyhound Derby final and is over hurdles being the third most valuable hurdle race behind the Grand National and Springbok.

The race was switched to Central Park following the closure of Towcester and because Nottingham (the new hosts of the Derby) did not run hurdles races it no longer featured on Derby final night. In 2023, the event was run at Crayford Stadium but ended with the closure of Crayford Stadium in 2024.

== Venues and distances ==
- 1990–2009 (Wimbledon, 460m hurdles)
- 2010–2016 (Wimbledon, 480m hurdles)
- 2017–2018 (Towcester, 480m hurdles)
- 2019–2022 (Central Park, 480m hurdles)
- 2023–2024 (Crayford, 380m hurdles)

== Sponsors ==
- 1994–2006 (William Hill)
- 2007–2009 (Blue Square)
- 2010–2016 (William Hill}
- 2017–2018 (Star Sports)
- 2019–2020 (Racing Post Greyhound TV)
- 2021–2022 (Arena Racing Company)
- 2023–2024 (Ladbrokes)

== Past winners ==
Year	Winner	Breeding	Trainer	Time	SP	Notes/ref
1990	Cloran Major	Bold Work – Lively Genie	Steve Gammon (Ramsgate)	28.62	6/4f	
1991	Unbelievable	Echo Spark – Rathnasare	Linda Mullins (Walthamstow)	28.00	2/1	Track record
1992	Gaytime Yankee	Odell Yankee – Gaytime Harp	Sam Sykes (Wimbledon)	28.52	7/1	
1993	Ring Patriot	Kyle Jack – In Advance	Gordon Hodson (Hove)	27.96	4/1	
1994	Gis A Smile	Flashy Sir – Desert Pearl	Philip Rees Jr. (Wimbledon)	27.96	1/1f	
1995	Arrogant Prince	Ballinderry Ash – Proverbia	Tom Foster (Wimbledon)	28.29	5/2	
1996	Glown Fox	Polnoon Chief – Glown Mascot	Tom Foster (Wimbledon)	28.43	6/4f	
1997	Westmead Panda	Murlens Slippy – Ballynew Two	Nick Savva (Walthamstow)	28.19	3/1	
1998	Strideaway Teddy	Leaders Minstrel – Lomas Girl	Tom Foster (Wimbledon)	28.66	5/2	
1999	Monumental	Ardcollum Flash – Sister Nora	Tom Foster (Wimbledon)	28.49	25/1	
2000	Rackethall Rover	Moaning Lad – Galtymore Laura	Patsy Byrne (Wimbledon)	28.27	8/1	
2001	Born To Go	Staplers Jo – Lift Up	Tom Foster (Wimbledon)	28.52	7/2	
2002	Top Jock	Top Honcho – Lochar Lucy	Seamus Cahill (Wimbledon)	28.70	3/1	
2003	Farloe Browny	Blue Murlen – Seanos Miss	Seamus Cahill (Wimbledon)	28.09	10/1	
2004	Joe Bananas	Larkhill Jo – Woman Power	Nick Colton (Oxford)	28.23	6/4jf	
2005	Druids Mickey Jo	Top Honcho – Druids Villa	Seamus Cahill (Wimbledon)	28.07	4/5f	
2006	Stradeen Ouzo	Daves Mentor – Snazzy Flash	David Mullins (Romford)	28.47	11/4	
2007	Newlawn Berts	Tucks Mein – Berts Baby	Pat Cusack (Crayford)	27.96	9/4f	
2008	Morell Warrior	Larkhill Jo – Selsey Tess	Lorraine Sams (Crayford)	28.26	10/1	
2009	Platinumlancelot	Roanokee – Mist Of Avalon	Jason Foster (Wimbledon)	28.24	6/4f	
2010	Men Of Hope	Top Honcho – Razldazl Pearl	Jason Foster (Wimbledon)	29.18	3/1	Track record
2011	Plane Daddy	Big Daddy Cool – Lordsbury Knows	Gemma Davidson (Crayford)	30.16	8/1	
2012	Olivers Twist	Head Bound – Kewell Irony	Lisa Stephenson (Sheffield)	29.37	5/4f	
2013	Soviet Military	Premier Fantasy – Invincible Diva	Ricky Holloway (Private)	29.26	9/4	
2014	Cornamaddy Jumbo	Ardkill Jamie – Cornamaddy Maid	Mark Wallis (Yarmouth)	29.52	3/1	
2015	Jetstream Reason	Hondo Black – Handy Princess	Steve Gammon (Crayford)	29.24	7/2	
2016	Razldazl Raidio	Razldazl Rioga – Razldazl Marilyn	Ricky Holloway (Sittingbourne)	28.90	11/8f	
2017	Ballymac Manix	Ballymac Vic – Moyar Kite	Seamus Cahill (Hove)	29.17	10/11f	
2018	Lenson Wilson	Scolari Me Daddy – Killduff Kerry	Ricky Holloway (Central Park)	28.40	6/5f	
2019	Turnhouse Jet	Laughil Duke – Jaytee China	Ricky Holloway (Central Park)	29.59	4/1	
2020	Swift Loki	Swift Hoffman – Swift Elise	James Turner (Crayford)	29.65	6/1	
2021	Toolmaker Daddy	Scolari Me Daddy – Droopys Isabella	Ricky Holloway (Private)	30.26	11/1	
2022	Borna Rhythm	Cloran Paddy – Borna Gem	Anthony Collett (Central Park)	29.93	10/3	
2023	Lenson Doolin	Azza Azza Azza – The Other Tessa	Ricky Holloway (Crayford)	23.10	4/6f	Track record
2024	Nunhead Shiv	Ballymac Best – Flat White	Barry O'Sullivan (Central Park)	23.54	12/1	

== Winning trainers ==
- Ricky Holloway 6
- Tom Foster 5
- Seamus Cahill 4
