= Springbok (greyhounds) =

British greyhound racing event

The Springbok
- Class: Category 2
- Location: Various
- Inaugurated: 1937
- Final run: 2023

Race information
- Surface: Sand
- Qualification: Hurdlers only

The Springbok was a greyhound racing hurdle competition last held at Brighton & Hove Greyhound Stadium in 2023.

== History ==
The event was inaugurated in 1937 at the White City Stadium in London. The origins of the race came from a contingent of greyhounds that included Hawtrey, Raven Arms and Bobby Sparks that travelled to South Africa in the winter of 1936/1937 as a series of race tests for the country. In return the South African Greyhound Racing Association gifted a trophy to the Greyhound Racing Association and a perpetual award for a new race was created.

The event was held at White City until its closure in 1985 when it switched to Wimbledon Stadium. The event is the leading competition for novice hurdlers.

In 2017 the race switched to Central Park Stadium in Sittingbourne following the closure of Wimbledon Stadium. The relocation of the competition to Central Park continued a family legacy for the Cearns family who had been connected with the race when it was first held in 1937. In 2023, the race was held at Brighton & Hove Greyhound Stadium while track renovation was taking place at Central Park but Central Park did not continue hurdle racing when the new track was completed.

== Venues and distances ==
- 1937–1985 (White City (London), 550y hurdles)
- 1986–2010 (Wimbledon, 460m hurdles)
- 2011–2016 (Wimbledon, 480m hurdles)
- 2017–2022 (Central Park, 480m hurdles)
- 2023–2023 (Hove, 500m hurdles)

== Sponsors ==
- 1994–1995 (John Henwood)
- 2000–2006 (William Hill)
- 2007–2007 (Betfair)
- 2008–2009 (Stan James Bookmakers)
- 2010–2016 (William Hill)
- 2017–2021 (Cearnsport)
- 2022–2022 (Arena Racing Company)
- 2023–2023 (Coral)

== Past winners ==
Year	Winner	Breeding	Trainer	Time (sec)	SP	Notes/ref
1937	Curious Jester		Sidney Orton (Wimbledon)	30.98	7/4f	
1938	Bantown Banner		Eric Hiscock (Harringay)	30.85	5/4f	
1939	Corporal of Waterhall		Paddy Fortune (Wimbledon)	30.42	3/1	
1946	Alvaston Commando		Bill Cowell (Coventry)	32.33	7/4f	
1947	Kids Delight		Albert Jonas (Stamford Bridge)	32.55	3/1	
1948	Neff		Miss J Griffiths (Walthamstow)	30.97	4/7f	
1949	Mighty Maharatta		Jerry Hannafin (Wimbledon)	30.94	5/4f	
1950	Sunny Abbey		Jerry Hannafin (Wimbledon)	30.26	9/4	
1951	Devil O'Leer	Bahs Choice – Baytown Nightingale	Norman Merchant (Private)	31.03	3/1	
1952	Wild Der	Border Keeper – Gilmours Glory	Paddy McEllistrim (Wimbledon)	30.32	15/8	
1953	Oriel Idol	Shaggy Lad – Rushton Curly	Dal Hawkesley (West Ham)	30.20	5/2	
1954	Ventry Record	Record Choice – Anvil Block	Henry Parsons (Crayford)	33.60	8/1	
1955	Riot O'Leer	Despot O'Leer – Magic Blissful	Jack Chadwick (Private)	32.66	7/2	
1956	Harlington Harrier		Dal Hawkesley (West Ham)	32.80	7/1	
1957	Racing Max	Ballybeg Surprise – Racing Fool	Reg Bosley (Hackney)	32.92	6/1	
1958	Highway Tim	Magourna Reject – Hunston Bell	Mrs Rosealie Beba (Private)	32.25	5/1	
1959	Downside	Barrowside – Celtic Beauty	Jack Harvey (Wembley)	32.24	9/4	
1960	Shannon Dasher	Prince of Bermuda – Shannon Drive	Jimmy Maw (Private)	32.15	7/2	
1961	Ballydrislane Customer	Quare Customer – Cold Lady	George Waterman (Wimbledon)	31.78		
1962	Barrel Kissane	Champion Prince - Yoblstrap	Barney O'Connor (Walthamstow)	31.47	2/1	
1963	Longstreet	Barrowside – Sallyscross Lady	Jack Harvey (Wembley)	31.88		
1964	The Grange Destiny	The Grand Fire - Delienne	George Waterman (Wimbledon)	31.98	7/4	
1965	Darn Hall	Crazy Parachute - Penicola	Bob Burls (Wembley)	32.33		
1966	Husky Breeze	Pigalle Wonder – Jet Dancer	John Bassett (Private)	32.20		
1967	High St Boy	Champion Tipp – Fire Siren	Colin McNally (Perry Barr)	31.50		
1968	Haydens Star	Fairys Chum – Haydens Fire	Nora Gleeson (Private)	31.60	6/1	
1969	Happy Harry	Crazy Society – Hiver Swanky	Phil Rees Sr. (Wimbledon)	31.92	7/4	
1970	Bawnies Rocket	Come On Bawnie – Toor Lassie	Phil Rees Sr. (Wimbledon)	31.86	2/1	
1971	Ragtime	Super Orange – Maggie From Cork	John Coleman (Wembley)	32.10	5/4f	
1972	Jacks Ship	Rocket Ship – Amelia’s Pet	Bob Burls (Wembley)	32.16	11/10f	
1973	Killone Flash	Forward Flash – Dancing Barrier	Randy Singleton (White City - London)	31.53	9/2	
1974	Weston Pete	Monalee Champion – New Kashmir	Colin West (White City - London)	32.04	2/1	
1975	Ashgrove Road	Spectre II – Ashgrove Star	Paddy McEvoy (Wimbledon)	31.51	9/2	
1976	Stuart Captain	Ramdeen Stuart – Here For You	John Coleman (Wembley)	30.70	2/1f	
1977	Autumn Groves	Itsachampion – Green Line	Frank Melville (Harringay)	31.31	9/4	
1978	Super Hunter	Gaultier Fox – Fire Hunter	Phil Rees Jr. (Wimbledon)	30.47	8/15f	
1979	Westmead Manor	Mels Pupil – Westmead Silver	Natalie Savva (Private)	31.28	6/4	
1980	Bobcol	Westpark Mint – Black Katty	Norah McEllistrim (Wimbledon)	31.17	2/1	
1981	Clashing Ash	Clashing – Ballycline Sara	Phil Rees Jr. (Wimbledon)	30.57	6-/1	
1983	Space Top	Crazy Top – My Little Cugeen	Paddy Hancox (Perry Barr)	31.94	5/1	
1984	Scarcely Unknown	Hunday Dook – Speech Mistress	Derek Knight (Hove)	30.69	6/4f	
1985	Knight of Raft	Paradise Spectre – Lady Raft	Norah McEllistrim (Wimbledon)	28.65	8/11f	
1986	Raffles Nitespot	Yankee Express – Raffles Bridge	Linda Mullins (Harringay)	28.59	5/1	
1987	Lemon Yachtsman	Lindas Champion – Lemon Pearl	Philip Rees Jr. (Wimbledon)	28.36	7/2	
1988	Skyline Prince	Sheskin Rocket – Apache Laura	David Kinchett (Wimbledon)	28.59	5/1	
1989	Lemon Chip	Sinbad – Lemon Lisa	Philip Rees Jr. (Wimbledon)	28.87	6/1	
1990	Ranger Supreme	Citizen Supreme – White Ranger	Norah McEllistrim (Wimbledon)	28.80	5/4f	
1991	Fennessys Gold	Soda Fountain – Fast Mission	Ray Peacock (Catford)	28.41	5/1	
1992	Double Rock	Printers Present – Dolores Daughter	Philip Rees Jr. (Wimbledon)	28.62	25/1	
1993	Arfur Daley	Pond Mirage – Blue Mint II	Bert Meadows (Oxford)	27.80	3/1	Track record
1994	Avoid The Rush	Manorville Star – Smokey Snowdrop	Bernie Doyle (Private)	29.44	7/2	
1995	Arrogant Prince	Ballinderry Flash - Proverbia	Tom Foster (Wimbledon)	28.35	7/4jf	
1996	Colorado Joker	Green Gorse – Denver Minnie	Philip Rees Jr. (Wimbledon)	28.32	4/1	
1997	Simon Simon	Murlens Abbey – Lovely Lovely	Gary Baggs (Walthamstow)	28.21	5/1	
1998	Frisco Sir	Flashy Sir – Forever Roving	Ray Peacock (Wimbledon)	28.05	3/1	
1999	Ballinabola Gale	Batties Whisper – Ballinaboola Lil	Jason Foster (Catford)	28.11	1/1f	
2000	Lenson Eddie	Perfect Whisper – Culbidagh Rose	Ray Peacock (Wimbledon)	28.70	8/13f	
2001	Rossa Ranger	Come On Ranger – Emmerdale Pine	John Counsell (Private)	28.92	1/1f	
2002	Opus Joe	Roanokee - Glin Abbey Sharp	Pat Thompson (Crayford)	28.51	7/4	
2003	Deep Sensation	Spiral Nikita – Sensational	Jim Reynolds (Walthamstow)	28.51	3/1jf	
2004	Farloe Chinook	Thorgil Tex – Seanos Peer	Maxine Locke (Wimbledon)	29.23	20/1	
2005	Druids Mickey Jo	Top Honcho – Druids Villa	Seamus Cahill (Wimbledon)	28.14	8/13f	
2006	Kaysers Hill	Roanokee – Aghadown Phantom	Tom Foster (Private)	28.61	6/4f	
2007	Blackmagic Jamie	Daves Mentor – Glown Mist	Ernest Gaskin Jr. (Walthamstow)	28.62	8/1	
2008	Hotdog Jack	Droopys Vieri – Hare Star	Seamus Cahill (Wimbledon)	28.38	1/2f	
2009	Bomber Bailey	Confident Choice-Garry Special	Mark Wallis (Harlow)	27.96	6/1	
2010	Royal Honcho	Honcho Classic-Prina Donna	Seamus Cahill (Hove)	28.59	5/4f	
2011	Clonkeen Theo	Top Honcho-Good Luck	Jason Foster (Wimbledon)	29.47	8/1	
2012	Westmead Melanie	Droopys Maldini – Mega Delight	Nick Savva (Private)	29.59	10/11f	
2013	Westmead Meteor	Droopys Vieri – Westmead Olivia	Ricky Holloway (Wimbledon)	29.38	9/4f	
2014	Cornamaddy Jumbo	Ardkill Jamie – Cornamaddy Maid	Mark Wallis (Yarmouth)	29.45	11/8f	
2015	Reculver Ozzie	Farley Turbo – Lemon Bolt	Barry O'Sullivan (Crayford)	30.05	8/11f	
2016	Ballymac Manix	Ballymac Vic – Moyar Kite	Seamus Cahill (Hove)	29.11	2/1	
2017	Yassoo Martin	Blackstone Gene – Droopys Quinta	George Andreas (Central Park)	29.88	8/1	
2018	Lenson Wilson	Scolari Me Daddy – Killduff Kerry	Ricky Holloway (Central Park)	29.63	4/9f	
2019	Burgess Brandy	Vans Escalade – Borna Helena	Ricky Holloway (Central Park)	29.67	9/4	
2020	Burgess Doc	Droopys Jet – Badminton Maid	Lee Field (Monmore)	30.06	6/4f	
2021	Droopys Rex	Duke Special – Droopys Start	David Mullins (Romford)	29.94	7/2	
2022	Lenson Doolin	Azza Azza Azza – The Other Tessa	Ricky Holloway (Private)	29.39	1/4f	
2023	Droopys Chaser	Laughil Blake – Droopys Zero	Paul Young (Romford)	29.67	2/1f	
