= 2022 UK & Ireland Greyhound Racing Year =

Greyhound racing season

2022 UK & Ireland Greyhound Racing Year was the 97th year of greyhound racing in the United Kingdom and the 96th year of greyhound racing in Ireland.

== Summary ==
Suffolk Downs was granted a Greyhound Board of Great Britain (GBGB) licence in January 2022. The first trial session took place on 12 January and the first meeting was held on 8 February 2022, with the primary race distance being 388 metres.

A Westminster Hall debate was held on the 28 March following a petition presented by Welsh Labour MP Christina Rees for the abolition of greyhound racing. Rees stated that the petitioner wished to remain anonymous and raised welfare concerns, including in relation to Valley Greyhound Stadium, which is not affiliated with the GBGB, and Hope Rescue in Wales. The House resolved that it had considered the petition Following the debate, GBGB CEO Mark Bird welcomed what he described as political support for the sport and said the government had no intention of banning greyhound racing.

Mark Wallis won his fourth Trainers Championship (marketed as Judgement Night), which was held at Monmore Green. He would go on to win the Greyhound Trainer of the Year for a 13th time.

The major open race circuit saw a significant increment in prize money levels. Premier Greyhound Racing (the collaboration between the Arena Racing Company and Entain increased the winning prize of two original classics, the St Leger and Oaks to £20,000. Additionally, the Golden Jacket, Champion Stakes, Regency and Eclipse also offered a £20,000 first prize. Towcester continued to hold events with a £10,000 winner's prize. The addition of the new category 1 competitions resulted in the GBGB changing the rules in relation to the number of rounds held. The new ruling (from 2023) would see category 1 events, except the classics, held over three rounds instead of four.

The industry was split on the new GBGB rule that stated a greyhound not to run more than once in a four day period (this included trials). This upset many of the leading figures within the industry who argued that trainers were in the best position to establish when a greyhound should race or trial. The rule was seen by some as an appeasement to welfare groups but others argued that it was a way to eliminate any excessive racing demands of a greyhound.

Oxford Stadium reopened after a ten year absence, the track saw a capacity attendance for the meeting held on 2 September. The reopening of one of the sports most popular tracks was another boost for the industry. Just ten days later at the track, during the sales trials on 13 September the British sales record for a greyhound was broken when Drumcrow Mini was sold for £16,300. However, Oxford still remained in the ownership of a property developer and was only operated on a lease.

On 27 September 2022, the RSPCA, Blue Cross and Dogs Trust jointly called for a phased ban on greyhound racing within five years. The GBGB criticised the proposal, describing it as based on inaccurate data and influenced by "animal rights extremists".

== Roll of honour ==
Major Winners
Award	Name of Winner
2022 English Greyhound Derby	Romeo Magico
2022 Irish Greyhound Derby	Born Warrior
Greyhound Trainer of the Year	Mark Wallis
UK Greyhound of the Year	Coolavanny Aunty
Irish Greyhound of the Year	Born Warrior

Premier Greyhound Racing Trainers Championship, Monmore (30 Apr)
Pos	Name of Trainer	Points
1st	Mark Wallis	52
2nd	Patrick Janssens	45
3rd	Kevin Hutton	42
4th	Angela Harrison	35
5th	David Mullins	26
6th	Ricky Holloway	11

== Competitions ==
=== United Kingdom ===
The St Leger champion Space Jet continued her fine form from 2021, when winning the prestigious Coral TV Trophy at Brighton in April. Coolavanny Aunty claimed a significant double when winning the Essex Vase and Grand Prix, as did Signet Denver who took the Laurels and Produce Stakes.

=== Ireland ===
The 2021 Irish Greyhound Derby champion Susie Sapphire impressed again when winning the Easter Cup, she started at odds of 1/3 for the final (the shortest price in the modern era).

=== Principal UK finals ===
Premier Greyhound Racing Golden Jacket, Crayford (19 Feb, 714m, £20,000)
Pos	Name of Greyhound	Trap	SP	Time	Trainer
1st	Bellmore Sally	4	5/4f	44.81	James Fenwick
2nd	Droopys Senorita	5	18/1	45.23	Claude Gardiner
3rd	Warzone Tom	3	15/8	45.61	Liz McNair
4th	Piercestown Dove	2	6/1	45.67	Derek Knight
5th	Burgess Hannah	6	25/1	45.68	Anthony Gifkins
6th	Antigua Lava	1	6/1	45.74	Mark Wallis

Coral TV Trophy, Brighton (9 April, 955m, £15,000)
Pos	Name of Greyhound	Trap	SP	Time	Trainer
1st	Space Jet	4	4/9f	58.86	Matt Dartnall
2nd	Blueberry Bullet	1	11/4	59.17	Mark Wallis
3rd	Droopys Senorita	6	40/1	59.79	Claude Gardiner
4th	Bockos Brandy	2	14/1	59.89	Patrick Janssens
5th	Aayamza Royale	5	14/1	59.98	Mark Wallis
6th	Antigua Lava	3		N/R	Mark Wallis

Arena Racing Company Laurels, Perry Barr (28 Apr, 480m, £10,000)
Pos	Name of Greyhound	Trap	SP	Time	Trainer
1st	Signet Denver	1	11/4	28.14	Kevin Hutton
2nd	Chelms Yes	3	14/1	28.28	John Mullins
3rd	Lautaro	5	9/4f	28.30	Patrick Janssens
4th	Headford Flash	6	9/1	28.64	Kevin Hutton
5th	Aussie Captain	2	9/2	28.65	Patrick Janssens
6th	Trionas Travel	4	5/2	28.95	Ernest Skeech

Premier Greyhound Racing Regency, Brighton (30 Jul, 695m, £20,000)
Pos	Name of Greyhound	Trap	SP	Time	Trainer
1st	Troy Suzieeq	5	28/1	42.14	David Mullins
2nd	Bombardier	2	2/1jf	42.19	Mark Wallis
3rd	Callmesteve	6	2/1jf	42.24	John Mullins
4th	Chelms Club	4	7/2	42.50	Jason Heath
5th	Baggios Champ	1	3/1	42.52	Frank Bryce
6th	Russian Sammy	3	50/1	42.88	David Elcock

Premier Greyhound Racing St Leger, Perry Barr (29 Sep, 710m, £20,000)
Pos	Name of Greyhound	Trap	SP	Time	Trainer
1st	Havana Lover	5	11/10f	43.10	Liz McNair
2nd	Savana Volcano	6	4/1	43.18	Diane Henry
3rd	Savana Ruinart	3	3/1	43.20	Diane Henry
4th	Chelms Cub	1	18/1	43.36	Jason Heath
5th	Droopys Jungle	4	11/1	43.62	Matt Dartnall
6th	Cochise	2	6/1	43.72	Richard Rees

Premier Greyhound Racing Oaks, Perry Barr (27 Oct, 480m, £20,000)
Pos	Name of Greyhound	Trap	SP	Time	Trainer
1st	Slick Sakina	5	11/8f	27.85 (TR)	Patrick Janssens
2nd	Bonjour Bullet	4	20/1	28.21	Belinda Green
3rd	Distant Emma	6	10/3	28.23	Barrie Draper
4th	Westwell Emer	1	9/1	28.59	Kevin Hutton
5th	Global Prima	3	9/1	28.79	Patrick Janssens
6th	Fabulous Azurra	2	9/4	28.87	Patrick Janssens

Ladbrokes Cesarewitch, Crayford (26 Nov, 874m, £10,000)
Pos	Name of Greyhound	Trap	SP	Time	Trainer
1st	Savana Volcano	5	2/1f	56.04	Diane Henry
2nd	Beach Babe	6	14/1	56.44	Tom Levers
3rd	Blueberry Bullet	2	5/2	56.72	Mark Wallis
4th	Savana Regera	4	14/1	56.78	Diane Henry
5th	Antiqua Lava	1	5/2	56.84	Mark Wallis
6th	Kilshannig Marie	3	6/1	56.96	Julie Luckhurst

=== Principal Irish finals ===
Bresbet Easter Cup, Shelbourne (19 Mar, 550y, €25,000)
Pos	Name of Greyhound	Trap	SP	Time	Trainer
1st	Susie Sapphire	1	1/3f	29.48	Owen McKenna
2nd	Beach Avenue	6	14/1	29.79	Paul Hennessy
3rd	Priceless Jet	5	16/1	30.00	Paul Hennessy
4th	Darbys Delight	4	33/1	30.21	Neilus O'Connell
5th	Knight Tornado	2	9/1	30.27	Graham Holland
6th	Romeo Magico	3	9/2	30.41	Graham Holland

Con & Annie Kirby Memorial, Limerick (22 Apr, 525y, €80,000)
Pos	Name of Greyhound	Trap	SP	Time	Trainer
1st	Swords Rex	1	9/4f	28.27	Graham Holland
2nd	Magical Kuba	6	11/2	28.58	Patrick Guilfoyle
3rd	Kildare	4	7/2	28.69	Peter Cronin
4th	Ballinabola Ed	5	5/2	28.72	Pat Buckley
5th	Droopys Edison	3	6/1	28.73	Robert G. Gleeson
6th	Scooby Prince	2	14/1	28.87	Jennifer O'Donnell

Larry O'Rourke National Produce, Clonmel (5 Jun, 525y, €17,000)
Pos	Name of Greyhound	Trap	SP	Time	Trainer
1st	Gaston Pecas	1	6/1	28.36	Pat Buckley
2nd	Serene Tiger	5	10/1	28.39	Michael J O'Donovan
3rd	Newinn Homer	2	4/1	28.78	Graham Holland
4th	Sunshine Dream	4	10/1	28.88	Brendan Maunsell
5th	Swords Rex	3	2/5f	29.23	Graham Holland
6th	Radical Hero	6	8/1	29.72	Thomas O'Donovan

Sporting Press Oaks, Shelbourne Park (18 Jun, 525y, €25,000)
Pos	Name of Greyhound	Trap	SP	Time	Trainer
1st	Raha Mofo	3	3/1	28.14	Martin 'Murt' Leahy
2nd	Scooby Duchess	1	11/10f	28.17	Jennifer O'Donnell
3rd	Droopys Nextone	5	3/1	28.28	John A.Linehan
4th	Ballymac Art	2	8/1	28.56	Liam Dowling
5th	Ballymac Miranda	4	20/1	28.58	Kieran Lynch
6th	Tullovin Vita	6	20/1	28.86	James Wade

Dundalk International, Dundalk (12 Jul, 550y, €20,000)
Pos	Name of Greyhound	Trap	SP	Time	Trainer
1st	Explosive Boy	2	-	29.68	Patrick Guilfoyle
2nd	Singalong Sally	4	-	29.77	Pat Buckley
3rd	Good Cody	1	-	29.94	Patrick Guilfoyle
4th	Raha Mofo	6	-	30.05	Martin 'Murt' Leahy
5th	Gaston Pecas	3	-	30.17	Pat Buckley
6th	Ballymac Fairone	5	-	30.40	Liam Dowling

Boylesports Champion Stakes, Shelbourne Park (30 Jul, 550y, €20,000)
Pos	Name of Greyhound	Trap	SP	Time	Trainer
1st	One Time Only	1	3/1	29.67	Thomas O'Donovan
2nd	Twoinarow	2	9/2	29.77	Pat Kiely
3rd	Sentimental Lad	6	9/4f	29.83	Eimear Heeney
4th	Droopys Nice One	4	8/1	29.97	Martin 'Murt' Leahy
5th	Beach Avenue	3	12/1	30.04	Paul Hennessy
6th	Bockos Budsit	5	3/1	30.25	Graham Holland

Bar One Racing Irish Sprint Cup, Dundalk (15 Aug, 400y, €20,000)
Pos	Name of Greyhound	Trap	SP	Time	Trainer
1st	Hawkfield Ozark	3	-	20.89	Keeley McGee
2nd	Serene Ace	2	-	21.05	Michael J O'Donovan
3rd	Flashing Willow	6	-	21.10	Pat Buckley
4th	Runninta Shay	1	-	21.22	John A Linehan
5th	Westside Frank	4	-	21.47	Martin Lanney
6th	Manuone	5	-	21.54	Tony Maxwell

SIS Juvenile Derby, Shelbourne Park (22 Oct, 525y, €20,000)
Pos	Name of Greyhound	Trap	SP	Time	Trainer
1st	Clona Duke	4	20/1	28.23	Graham Holland
2nd	Droopys Got It	2	11/10f	28.58	Ian Reilly
3rd	Three Canons	3	14/1	28.75	Patrick Norris
4th	Bogger Hunter	1	5/1	29.00	Liam Peacock
5th	Trinity Junior	5	9/2	29.07	Peter Cronin
6th	Another Holiday	6	7/2	29.14	Michael J O'Donovan

Irish Laurels, Cork (5 Nov, 525y, €30,000)
Pos	Name of Greyhound	Trap	SP	Time	Trainer
1st	Good Cody	2	5/1	28.20	Patrick Guilfoyle
2nd	Ballymac Whispa	1	5/2	28.25	Liam Dowling
3rd	Swords Rex	6	9/4f	28.26	Graham Holland
4th	Serene Ace	3	7/2	28.37	Michael J O'Donovan
5th	Droopys Edison	4	7/1	28.47	Robert Gleeson
6th	Galloping Sydney	5	16/1	28.93	Graham Holland

Matchbook Irish St Leger, Limerick (18 Dec, 550y, €30,000)
Pos	Name of Greyhound	Trap	SP	Time	Trainer
1st	Bobsleigh Dream	1	11/8f	29.84	Pat Buckley
2nd	Mustang Jet	6	6/1	29.89	Dolores Ruth
3rd	Romeo Magico	4	11/4	30.42	Graham Holland
4th	Wi Can Dream	2	6/1	30.47	Patrick Guilfoyle
5th	Trinity Junior	3	11/1	30.48	Peter Cronin
6th	Annagh Bailey	5	8/1	30.58	Rachel Wheeler

=== UK Category 1 & 2 competitions ===
Competition	Date	Venue	Winning Greyhound
Coral Essex Vase	28 Jan	Romford	Coolavanny Aunty
Premarket Pets Blue Riband	30 Jan	Towcester	Ivy Hill Skyhigh
ARC Northern Puppy Derby	15 Feb	Newcastle	Freedom Alibi
Ladbrokes Winter Derby	26 Feb	Monmore	Burnchurch Mick
Northamptonshire Sprint	27 Feb	Towcester	Crossfield Dusty
Coral Golden Sprint	18 Mar	Romford	Rail Mccoy
Premier Greyhound Racing Puppy Derby	19 Mar	Monmore	Deelish Frankie
BGBF British Breeders Stakes	21 Mar	Nottingham	Signet Otis
George Ing St Leger	26 Mar	Yarmouth	Blueberry Bullet
Arena Racing Company Northern Flat	29 Mar	Newcastle	Jaguar Macie
RPGTV Juvenile	3 Apr	Towcester	Bubbly Apache
Arena Racing Company Springbok	4 Apr	Central Park	Lenson Doolin
ARC Silver Salver	4 Apr	Central Park	Tintreach Jet
Coral Brighton Belle	9 Apr	Hove	Whats Up Eva
Arena Racing Company Grand Prix	21 Apr	Sunderland	Coolavanny Aunty
Matchbook Betting Maiden Derby	1 May	Towcester	Hellofakerfuffle
Jay & Kay Kent St Leger	21 May	Crayford	Rising Coco
Ladbrokes Guys and Dolls	21 May	Crayford	Icaals Rocco
Ladbrokes Kent Vase	21 May	Crayford	Bandicoot Sammy
BGBF British Bred Maiden Derby	31 May	Newcastle	Witton Razl
Coral Coronation Cup	10 June	Romford	Baby Bullet
RPGTV Derby Plate	25 June	Towcester	Chelms Switch
ARC Puppy Cup	30 Jun	Sunderland	Biscuit Billy
ARC Angel of the North	26 Jul	Newcastle	Crystal Alice
Coral Sussex Cup	30 Jul	Hove	Ninja Kerry
Stadium Bookmakers Juvenile Classic	7 Aug	Towcester	Antigua Sugar
Ladbrokes Gold Cup	27 Aug	Monmore	Move Over Cha
Ladbrokes Summer Stayers Classic	27 Aug	Monmore	Warzone Tom
JenningsBet Puppy Classic	29 Aug	Nottingham	Distant Podge
JenningsBet Select Stakes	29 Aug	Nottingham	Brookside Richie
BresBet East Anglian Derby	14 Sep	Yarmouth	Hopes Paddington
76th Produce Stakes	25 Sep	Swindon	Signet Denver
Bet365 Empress Stakes	25 Sep	Towcester	Fabulous Azurra
ARC Champion Hurdle	25 Sep	Central Park	Borna Rhythm
M Lambe Construction Birmingham Cup	29 Sep	Perry Barr	Ivanexile
Coral Romford Puppy Cup	30 Sep	Romford	Romeo Hotshot
BresBet Steel City Cup	15 Oct	Sheffield	Signet Goofy
Premier Greyhound Racing Champion Stakes	21 Oct	Romford	Warzone Tom
Stadium Bookmakers Hunt Cup	23 Oct	Towcester	Chelms Cub
ARC Scurry Gold Cup	27 Oct	Perry Barr	Gougane Jet
RPGTV Cowley Puppy Collar	28 Oct	Oxford	Fromposttopillar
Premier Greyhound Racing Kent Derby	30 Oct	Central Park	Arkady
Gain Nutrition 3 Steps to Victory	1 Nov	Sheffield	Coolavanny Aunty
ARC Classic	17 Nov	Sunderland	Move Over Cha
Gain Nutrition Sovereign Stakes	20 Nov	Towcester	Ballymac Slapup
Gain Nutrition Maiden Vase	25 Nov	Oxford	Outdoor Ice
Gain Nutrition Oxfordshire Gold Cup	25 Nov	Oxford	Swift Iconic
Ladbrokes Gold Collar	26 Nov	Crayford	Savana Ruinart
Ladbrokes Kent Rosebowl	26 Nov	Crayford	Adeles Duke
Ladbrokes Grand National	26 Nov	Crayford	Bobbing Gnavatar
Bet365 Puppy Oaks	27 Nov	Towcester	Minnie Bullet
Premier Greyhound Racing Eclipse	5 Dec	Nottingham	Slick Sakina
Coral Olympic	17 Dec	Hove	Fromposttopillar
George Curtis & Ballyregan Bob Memorial	17 Dec	Hove	Clongeel Ozzie
ARC National Sprint	19 Dec	Nottingham	Gougane Jet
British Bred Derby	20 Dec	Sheffield	Fabulous Azurra
Bet365 Challenge Cup	23 Dec	Oxford	Chelms Cub
ARC All England Cup	27 Dec	Newcastle	Mickys Barrett
RPGTV Puppy Derby	2 Jan+	Towcester	n/a

+ delayed and then cancelled

=== Irish feature competitions ===
Competition	Date	Venue	Winning Greyhound
RCETS Gold Cup	5 Feb	Shelbourne Park	Skywalker Barry
Greyhound & Petworld Juvenile Classic	11 Mar	Tralee	Wi Can Dream
Ballymac Anton at Stud McCalmont Cup	25 Mar	Kilkenny	Zoom
Waterford Select Stakes	3 Apr	Waterford	Explosive Boy
Shelbourne 600	9 Apr	Shelbourne Park	Fast Fit Paddy
RPGTV Irish Cesarewitch	15 May	Mullingar	Magical Mary
Callaway Ramber at Stud Race of Champions	17 Jun	Tralee	Bockos Budsit
Champion 550	9 Jul	Shelbourne Park	Vincenzo
Corn Cuchulainn	16 Jul	Shelbourne Park	Crafty Kokoro
Centenary Agri Tipperary Cup	6 Aug	Thurles	Bobsleigh Dream
