= 2020 UK & Ireland Greyhound Racing Year =

2020 UK & Ireland Greyhound Racing Year was the 95th year of greyhound racing in the United Kingdom and the 94th year of greyhound racing in Ireland.

The year was best known for the major disruption caused by the COVID-19 pandemic. The 2020 English Greyhound Derby was postponed and the Arena Racing Company tracks announced a behind closed doors policy from 24 March. ARC's rivals SIS took advantage of the horse racing cancellations by increasing its own schedule by an extra 54 races per week to 532 in total. Henlow increased to eight meetings per week. Racing in Ireland was seriously affected with the industry banning the public from attending meetings. The Irish Greyhound Board (IGB) enforced the ban from Thursday 12 March, with racing continuing with a behind closed doors policy.

The situation worsened and following increased government restrictions all betting shops were closed from March and the open race calendar was suspended, meaning that only graded racing would take place until further notice. Following further announcements by the Prime Minister Boris Johnson on 23 March racing in the UK was suspended and this was followed by Ireland the following day. The industry united with many tracks announcing financial help for every racing and retired greyhound attached to their track, the payments were in addition to the financial help pledged by the Greyhound Board of Great Britain (GBGB).

When trials returned (18 May) following the lock-down Peterborough announced that they would not be re-opening until they sought further clarification from the GBGB. The concerns over the financial implication of racing behind closed doors was evident and the following day (20 May) the Perkins family announced the permanent closure of the track. Although UK racing finally returned on 1 June (at Perry Barr) it was behind closed doors and both Poole Stadium and Belle Vue Stadium remained closed with the possibility of not re-opening being a serious consideration. Then on 1 August, Belle Vue announced that it had closed for good and this was followed by Poole on 22 September. Three tracks had now closed permanently, two of them as a consequence of the pandemic.

As 2020 came to a close the pandemic continued to dramatically affect the industry with no immediate sign of crowds being allowed to return. One positive consequence of the pandemic was that many homing organisations including the Lincolnshire, Suffolk and Portsmouth Greyhound Trusts were reporting that all retired greyhounds were being homed and that there was a shortage. The shortage was caused by a combination of higher demand for pets and less race tracks, however concerns were raised that if the shortage of retired greyhounds continued it could force some homing organisations to close.

== Roll of honour ==
Major Winners
| Award | Name of Winner |
|---|---|
| 2020 English Greyhound Derby | Deerjet Sydney |
| 2020 Irish Greyhound Derby | Newinn Taylor |
| Greyhound Trainer of the Year | Patrick Janssens |
| UK Greyhound of the Year | Aayamza Royale |
| Irish Greyhound of the Year | Newinn Taylor |

Gain Nutrition GTA Trainers Championship, Sheffield (6 Apr)
| Pos | Name of Trainer | Points |
|---|---|---|
| N/A | cancelled due to COVID-19 | N/A |

== Summary ==
News not dominated by the COVID-19 pandemic included the Belle Vue Stadium scenario. Following the demise of the GRA in 2019 the industry waited for imminent closure of Belle Vue Stadium. The first track to be built in the United Kingdom (1926) had been approved for housing planning permission and awaited the official closure date. The stadium remained closed when racing returned following the virus ban, the economical impact of racing behind closed doors was quoted and then permanent closure was confirmed on 1 August.

The Arena Racing Company (ARC) became the UK's largest greyhound racing operator following the purchase of Nottingham Greyhound Stadium from Nottingham Greyhound Stadium Ltd.

2020 was noticeable for the continued recent trend of Irish greyhounds out performing their British opposition, a fact highlighted during the 2020 English Derby. Despite a reduced Irish entry, four greyhounds made the final for the second year in a row and third time in the history of the competition (2016, 2019 and 2020). The Irish duly won both of the sport's premier events with Deerjet Sydney taking the English Derby and Newinn Taylor winning the Irish Derby.

Patrick Janssens won his maiden Trainer of the Year title ending the eight-year reign of Mark Wallis. Wallis gained some compensation when his marathon star Aayamza Royale (a black bitch) won the 2020 Greyhound of the Year award, held as a virtual event in February 2021, due to the lockdown that was in place as a consequence of COVID-19.

== News ==
The sport lost two of its most famous names when trainers George Curtis and Ernie Gaskin both died, Gentleman George as he was known died on 17 April and Gaskin died on 24 February.

Towcester Greyhound Stadium due to re-open on 20 March with a trial session had to wait until the end of the Coronavirus before finally opening with a trial session on 22 May. The GBGB expressed its disappointment with the Greyhound Trust in an open letter, the Trust was reportedly on the verge of insolvency following a move to new offices that has cost somewhere in the region of £1.7 million. The GBGB were upset at the money used for new offices and argued that the money should have gone to re-homing greyhounds and warned that they could divert their £1.3 million funding to other homing areas. Leading performer Ice on Fire was retired following an unsuccessful attempt to return from injury, the decision came after a September trial for the Derby.

== Ireland ==
The Easter Cup was run behind closed doors and Wolfe made amends for his 2019 English Greyhound Derby problems by claiming the event for trainer Graham Holland. The quality of the competition was high with two Derby champions Priceless Blake and Ballyanne Sim both being eliminated in the semi-finals. After the lockdown the Champion Stakes attracted a superb entry which resulted in a shock win for Pestana, the blue brindle dog's fast break was the decisive factor for winning the event. Derby champion Lenson Bocko had a bad start and encountered trouble in the final that included three Liam Dowling runners.

A new star was seen in the final of the Larry O'Rourke National Produce, Newinn Taylor won his 12th successive race, the May 2018 whelp provided his trainer Graham Holland a third Produce champion in five years and then headed for the Irish Derby which he went on to win as well. Unfortunately during the Race of Champions night on 5 December, at Shelbourne Park, Newinn Taylor broke down after suffering a serious injury and the very next race on the card saw Lenson Bocko win his farewell race. The two Derby champions were retired and sent to stud by trainer Graham Holland.

The Social Democrat party campaigned to withdraw funding to greyhound racing but it came under criticism after it transpired that the abandoned greyhounds used part of the campaign to discredit the industry were found to be a lurcher and whippet (the latter from Denmark). The bill was defeated on the first motion vote.

Newinn Taylor was named Irish Greyhound of the Year.

== Competitions ==
The current Greyhound of the Year Ice On Fire continued his good form by winning the Juvenile at Sheffield. The revised schedule of racing after COVID-19 lockdown resulted in a strange calendar events because of the rearranged English and Irish Derby competitions. Kilara Lion won the East Anglian Derby but no greyhound had won more than one major event in England going into the delayed Derby. However, after the Derby had finished Kilara Lion won the Kent Derby in November, winning the final by over 6 lengths.

Smallmead trained by John Mullins had won both the Champion Stakes and St Leger by December and looked like a serious contender for greyhound of the year but suffered a major setback when a positive sample was returned which resulted in him being stripped of the Champion Stakes title. The Champion Stakes title was handed to runner-up Desperado Dan. The greyhound of the year title would go to the Mark Wallis trained Aayamza Royale following two major successes towards the latter part of the year. After winning the Cesarewitch in September she went on to win the Coral TV Trophy in December.

=== Principal UK finals ===
Ladbrokes Golden Jacket, Crayford (23 Feb, 714m, £17,500)
| Pos | Name of Greyhound | Trap | SP | Time | Trainer |
|---|---|---|---|---|---|
| 1st | Skilful Sandie | 4 | 7-2 | 44.87 | Patrick Janssens |
| 2nd | Antigua Fire | 6 | 5-4f | 44.99 | Mark Wallis |
| 3rd | Aayamza Express | 3 | 16-1 | 45.37 | Mark Wallis |
| 4th | Avastorm | 2 | 8-1 | 45.45 | Mark Wallis |
| 5th | Sheldan | 1 | 6-1 | 45.73 | Kevin Boon |
| 6th | Roxholme Poppy | 5 | 3-1 | 45.79 | Hayley Keightley |

RPGTV East Anglian Derby, Yarmouth (16 Sep, 462m, £10,000)
| Pos | Name of Greyhound | Trap | SP | Time | Trainer |
|---|---|---|---|---|---|
| 1st | Kilara Lion | 1 | 6-1 | 27.62 | Patrick Janssens |
| 2nd | Droopys Carat | 4 | 15-2 | 27.84 | Angela Harrison |
| 3rd | Troy Firebird | 6 | 7-2 | 28.02 | David Mullins |
| 4th | Lenson Whelan | 2 | 5-1 | 28.08 | Patrick Janssens |
| 5th | Lastfortheroad | 3 | 7-2 | 28.11 | Paul Burr |
| 6th | Levante Beach | 5 | 9-4f | 28.53 | Angela Harrison |

Cesarewitch Romford (25 Sep, 925m £8,000)
| Pos | Name of Greyhound | Trap | SP | Time | Trainer |
|---|---|---|---|---|---|
| 1st | Aayamza Royale | 3 | 15-8jf | 59.35 | Mark Wallis |
| 2nd | Micks Little Gem | 6 | 4-1 | 59.41 | Michelle Brown |
| 3rd | Affirmed | 5 | 14-1 | 59.51 | Pat Doocey |
| 4th | Three Ems | 1 | 10-3 | 59.69 | Paul Young |
| 5th | Mays Sweetpea | 2 | 80-1 | 59.79 | Martyn Wiley |
| 6th | Zascandil | 4 | 15-8jf | 59.83 | Kevin Boon |

Colossus Bets Grand National, Central Park (8 Nov, 480mH, £7,500)
| Pos | Name of Greyhound | Trap | SP | Time | Trainer |
|---|---|---|---|---|---|
| 1st | Roxholme Biscuit | 2 | 5-4f | 29.50 | Ricky Holloway |
| 2nd | Nomansland Flyer | 6 | 6-4 | 29.68 | Ricky Holloway |
| 3rd | Lenson Wilson | 3 | 8-1 | 29.79 | Ricky Holloway |
| 4th | Toughest Test | 5 | 12-1 | 29.97 | Jim Reynolds |
| 5th | Roxholme Butt | 1 | 9-2 | 30.18 | Ricky Holloway |
| 6th | Subterfuge | 4 | 33-1 | 30.52 | James Turner |

RPGTV St Leger, Perry Barr (26 Nov, 710m £10,000)
| Pos | Name of Greyhound | Trap | SP | Time | Trainer |
|---|---|---|---|---|---|
| 1st | Smallmead | 2 | 10-1 | 43.37 | John Mullins |
| 2nd | Salacres Pippy | 4 | 40-1 | 43.49 | Peter Harnden |
| 3rd | Aayamza Royale | 6 | 5-1 | 43.51 | Mark Wallis |
| 4th | Ballydoyle Bee | 3 | 16-1 | 43.59 | Hayley Keightley |
| 5th | Roxholme Kristof | 5 | 4-11f | 43.60 | Hayley Keightley |
| 6th | Blue Tick George | 1 | 8-1 | 43.78 | Jim Daly |

Coral TV Trophy, Hove (19 Dec, 945m £10,000)
| Pos | Name of Greyhound | Trap | SP | Time | Trainer |
|---|---|---|---|---|---|
| 1st | Aayamza Royale | 4 | 1-1f | 61.05 | Mark Wallis |
| 2nd | Redzer Renae | 3 | 16-1 | 61.10 | Anthony Gifkins |
| 3rd | Droopys Bird | 1 | 28-1 | 61.59 | Simon Harms |
| 4th | Roxholme Kristof | 2 | 5-4 | 61.76 | Hayley Keightley |
| 5th | Micks Little Gem | 5 | 12-1 | 61.91 | Michelle Brown |
| 6th | Antigua Fire | 6 | 12-1 | 61.95 | Mark Wallis |

Property 192 Oaks, Swindon (20 Dec, 476m £15,000)
| Pos | Name of Greyhound | Trap | SP | Time | Trainer |
|---|---|---|---|---|---|
| 1st | Ballymac Trend | 3 | 25-1 | 28.41 | Angie Kibble |
| 2nd | Queen Jessiej | 2 | 5-6f | 28.56 | Liz McNair |
| 3rd | Lights Out | 1 | 5-1 | 28.65 | Kevin Hutton |
| 4th | Baggios Gem | 4 | 33-1 | 29.13 | Frank Bryce |
| 5th | Newinn Liz | 6 | 15-8 | 29.31 | Ernest Gaskin Jr. |
| 6th | Fantastical | 5 | 16-1 | 29.49 | John Mullins |

=== Principal Irish finals ===
Ladbrokes Easter Cup, Shelbourne (14 Mar, 550y, €25,000)
| Pos | Name of Greyhound | Trap | SP | Time | Trainer |
|---|---|---|---|---|---|
| 1st | Wolfe | 3 | 6-4f | 29.89 | Graham Holland |
| 2nd | Ballymac Anton | 1 | 7-4 | 29.99 | Liam Dowling |
| 3rd | Ballymac Inspeed | 6 | 8-1 | 30.06 | Liam Dowling |
| 4th | Murts Boher | 2 | 10-1 | 30.13 | Graham Holland |
| 5th | Laughil Josh | 4 | 12-1 | 30.41 | Patrick Guilfoyle |
| 6th | Razldazl Peaky | 5 | 25-1 | 30.45 | Neilus O'Connell |

Boylesports Champion Stakes, Shelbourne (25 Jul, 550y, €20,000)
| Pos | Name of Greyhound | Trap | SP | Time | Trainer |
|---|---|---|---|---|---|
| 1st | Pestana | 3 | 6-1 | 29.57 | Owen McKenna |
| 2nd | Ballymac Wild | 1 | 10-1 | 29.78 | Liam Dowling |
| 3rd | Ballymac Anton | 2 | 6-1 | 29.79 | Liam Dowling |
| 4th | Ballymac Cooper | 6 | 5-2 | 29.80 | Liam Dowling |
| 5th | Ballyhimikin Jet | 4 | 7-2 | 29.97 | Graham Holland |
| 6th | Lenson Bocko | 5 | 6-4f | 30.18 | Graham Holland |

Larry O'Rourke National Produce, Clonmel (2 Aug, 525y, €17,000)
| Pos | Name of Greyhound | Trap | SP | Time | Trainer |
|---|---|---|---|---|---|
| 1st | Newinn Taylor | 6 | - | 28.34 | Graham Holland |
| 2nd | Jacks Solution | 5 | - | 28.44 | Peter Cronin |
| 3rd | Doolin Duke | 1 | - | 28.79 | Graham Holland |
| 4th | Epic Hero | 3 | - | 28.86 | Thomas O'Donovan |
| 5th | Rathcoole Fox | 2 | - | 29.21 | Graham Holland |
| 6th | Romeo Speedy | 4 | - | 29.74 | Graham Holland |

Juvenile Derby, Shelbourne (17 Oct, 525y, €20,000)
| Pos | Name of Greyhound | Trap | SP | Time | Trainer |
|---|---|---|---|---|---|
| 1st | Skywalker Barry | 1 | - | 28.13 | Mark O'Donovan |
| 2nd | Deadly Missile | 5 | - | 28.30 | Mark O'Donovan |
| 3rd | Knight Tornado | 2 | - | 28.34 | Oliver Bray |
| 4th | Newinn Sheedy | 4 | - | 28.72 | Graham Holland |
| 5th | Darth Vader | 3 | - | 28.83 | Trevor Cummins/ Padraig Gantley |
| 6th | Ballymac Gaybo | 6 | - | 29.04 | Garry Dempsey |

Irish Laurels, Cork (24 Oct, 525y, €30,000)
| Pos | Name of Greyhound | Trap | SP | Time | Trainer |
|---|---|---|---|---|---|
| 1st | Runninta Seeya | 2 | - | 28.48 | John Linehan |
| 2nd | Blastoff Fire | 1 | - | 28.49 | Philip Buckley |
| 3rd | Brodys Magic | 6 | - | 28.51 | David Murray |
| 4th | Witches Ethiopia | 4 | - | 28.58 | Edel Twomey |
| 5th | Droopys Hamish | 5 | - | 28.68 | John Linehan |
| 6th | Ballymac Anton | 3 | - | 28.75 | Liam Dowling |

Sporting Press Oaks, Shelbourne (21 Nov, 525y, €25,000)
| Pos | Name of Greyhound | Trap | SP | Time | Trainer |
|---|---|---|---|---|---|
| 1st | Ballymac Beanie | 2 | 28.18 | - | Declan Byrne |
| 2nd | Droopys Curio | 4 | 28.42 | - | Robert G Gleeson |
| 3rd | Ballymac Juliet | 5 | 28.53 | - | Liam Dowling |
| 4th | Swanley Chick | 1 | 28.54 | - | John McGee Sr. |
| 5th | Ballymac Art | 3 | 28.75 | - | Liam Dowling |
| 6th | Nemesis | 6 | 28.77 | - | Cathal McGhee |

Friends of Limerick Irish St Leger, Limerick (28 Nov, 550y, €30,000)
| Pos | Name of Greyhound | Trap | SP | Time | Trainer |
|---|---|---|---|---|---|
| 1st | Epic Hero | 2 | - | 29.44 | Thomas O'Donovan |
| 2nd | Cash Ready | 1 | - | 29.65 | Denis Fitzgerald |
| 3rd | Meenagh Miracle | 5 | - | 29.75 | Michael Corr |
| 4th | Oran Don | 6 | - | 29.89 | Marie Gilbert |
| 5th | Ballymac Wild | 4 | - | 29.91 | Liam Dowling |
| 6th | Amazing Alice | 3 | - | 29.98 | Peter Sutcliffe |

=== UK Category 1 & 2 competitions ===
| Competition | Date | Venue | Winning Greyhound | Winning Trainer | Time | SP | Notes |
|---|---|---|---|---|---|---|---|
| Coral Coronation Cup | 18 Jan | Romford | Antigua Rum | Mark Wallis (Henlow) | 35.06 | 8-1 | |
| Racing Post GTV Juvenile | 29 Feb | Sheffield | Ice on Fire | James Fenwick (Newcastle) | 29.21 | 2-5f | |
| Cearnsport Springbok | 1 Mar | Central Park | Burgess Doc | Lee Field (Monmore) | 30.06 | 6-4f | |
| British Bred Maidens | 13 Mar | Romford | Go Pat Go | Nathan Hunt (Romford) | 24.21 | 4-1 | |
| Coral Golden Sprint | 13 Mar | Romford | Goldies Hoddle | Patrick Janssens (Central Park) | 23.86 | 3-1 | |
| Ladbrokes Puppy Derby | 21 Mar | Monmore | Newinn Jacko | Ernest Gaskin Jr. (Private) | 28.72 | 11-4 | |
| RPGTV Steel City Cup | 21 Mar | Sheffield | Headford Ranger | Kevin Hutton (Monmore) | 28.63 | 11-8f | |
| Colossus Bets Silver Salver | 19 Jul | Central Park | Shrewd Call | David Mullins (Romford) | 16.12 | 7-4f | |
| RPGTV All England Cup | 30 Jul | Newcastle | Bower Luke | Pat Rosney (Belle Vue) | 28.23 | 11-2 | |
| Coral Sussex Cup | 1 Aug | Hove | Bockos Doomie | Patrick Janssens (Central Park) | 29.69 | 1-1f | |
| Coral Regency | 1 Aug | Hove | Zascandil | Kevin Boon (Yarmouth) | 41.74 | 7-2 | |
| Racing Post GTV Champion Hurdle | 2 Aug | Central Park | Swift Loki | James Turner (Crayford) | 29.65 | 6-1 | |
| British Bred Oaks | 24 Aug | Doncaster | Fearsome Encore | Chris Akers (Sheffield) | 29.58 | 5-2jf | |
| Ladbrokes Summer Stayers Classic | 29 Aug | Monmore | Kingsbrook Glyn | Kevin Hutton (Monmore) | 37.66 | 5-1 | |
| Ladbrokes Gold Cup | 29 Aug | Monmore | Gonzo | Julie Bateson (Private) | 28.31 | 9-2 | |
| British Bred Sprint | 30 Aug | Towcester | King Drake | Liz McNair (Private) | 16.24 | 8-15f | |
| Coral Champion Stakes | 18 Sep | Romford | Desperado Dan | Patrick Janssens (Central Park) | 34.93 | 10-3 | |
| Coral Romford Puppy Cup | 18 Sep | Romford | Tenpin | David Mullins (Romford) | 23.71 | 9-4 | |
| 74th British Bred Produce Stakes | 20 Sep | Swindon | Queen Jessiej | Liz McNair (Private) | 27.95 | 8-11f | |
| Coral Guys and Dolls | 25 Sep | Romford | Melodys Secret | Spencer Mavrias (Harlow) | 24.32 | 11-1 | |
| Gain Nutrition 3 Steps to Victory | 29 Sep | Sheffield | Roxholme Kristof | Hayley Keightley (Private) | 38.57 | 4-9f | |
| Henlow Maiden Derby | 11 Oct | Henlow | Roxholme Olaf | Hayley Keightley (Private) | 27.02 | 4-5f | |
| BGBF Scurry Cup | 14 Oct | Harlow | Dundee June | David Lewis (Swindon) | 26.88 | 9-1 | |
| BGBF Northern Maiden Standard | 15 Oct | Newcastle | Acomb Jenny | Kevin Ferguson (Kinsley) | 28.54 | 1-2f | |
| Kent National Hurdle | 17 Oct | Crayford | Roxholme Biscuit | Ricky Holloway (Central Park) | 34.58 | 2-5f | |
| Jay & Kay Coach Tours Kent St Leger | 17 Oct | Crayford | Droopys Bird | Simon Harms (Private) | 45.51 | 10-1 | |
| Ladbrokes Gold Collar | 17 Oct | Crayford | Desperado Dan | Patrick Janssens (Central Park) | 33.64 | 1-2f | |
| Crayford Rosebowl | 17 Oct | Crayford | Signature Callum | Michelle Brown (Henlow) | 23.43 | 6-4f | |
| Derby Plate | 30 Oct | Nottingham | Doolin Duke | Pat Buckley (Ireland) | 29.21 | 10-11f | |
| M Lambe Construction Birmingham Cup | 26 Nov | Perry Barr | Droopys Carat | Angela Harrison (Newcastle) | 28.74 | 8-1 | |
| Ladbrokes Kent Derby | 29 Nov | Central Park | Kilara Lion | Patrick Janssens (Central Park) | 28.90 | 7-1 | |
| Coral Essex Vase | 4 Dec | Romford | Kilmessan Puma | David Mullins (Romford) | 35.47 | 16-1 | |
| BGBF British Bred Derby | 15 Dec | Sheffield | Elderberry Sky | Patricia Cowdrill (Monmore) | 28.74 | 5-4f | |
| Star Sports Puppy Deby | 18 Dec | Towcester | Surprising | Seamus Cahill (Hove) | 29.35 | 11-4cf | |
| Coral Olympic | 19 Dec | Hove | Newinn Jacko | Ernest Gaskin Jr. (Private) | 31.43 | 7-2 | |
| Coral Brighton Belle | 19 Dec | Hove | Droopys Aoife | Ernest Gaskin Jr. (Private) | 31.48 | 13-8 | |
| RPGTV National Sprint | 21 Dec | Nottingham | Loggies Lito | Simon Harms (Private) | 17.88 | 11-8f | |
| Scottish Greyhound Derby | | Shawfield | cancelled+ | | | | |
| Golden Crest | | Poole | cancelled+ | | | | |
| Crayford Vase | | Crayford | cancelled+ | | | | |
| Classic | | Sunderland | cancelled+ | | | | |
| Select Stakes | | Nottingham | cancelled+ | | | | |
| Puppy Classic | | Nottingham | cancelled+ | | | | |
| British Breeders Stakes | | Nottingham | cancelled+ | | | | |
| Yorkshire St Leger | | Doncaster | cancelled+ | | | | |
| Carling Eclipse | | Nottingham | cancelled+ | | | | |
| Trafalgar Cup | | Monmore | cancelled+ | | | | |
| Laurels | | Newcastle | cancelled+ | | | | |
| Northern Puppy Derby | | Newcastle | cancelled+ | | | | |

=== Irish feature competitions ===
| Competition | Date | Venue | Winning Greyhound | Winning Trainer | Time | SP | Notes |
|---|---|---|---|---|---|---|---|
| Best Car Parks Gold Cup | 8 Feb | Shelbourne | Ballymac Anton | Liam Dowling | 28.87 | 7-4f | |
| Corn Cuchulainn | 1 Aug | Shelbourne | Ballymac Kingdom | Liam Dowling | 41.41 | 5-2jf | |
| Centenary Agri Tipperary Cup | 8 Aug | Thurles | Riverside Leo | Graham Holland | 28.65 | 6-4f | |
| Bar One Racing Irish Sprint Cup | 15 Aug | Dundalk | Grangeview Ten | Patrick Guilfoyle | 20.88 | 5-4jf | |
| Kilkenny Track Champion Open Unraced | 11 Sep | Kilkenny | Deadly Samuri | Karol Ramsbottom | 28.62 | NB | |
| Emerald Isle Casino Cambridgeshire | 12 Sep | Limerick | Skywalker Logan | Patrick Guilfoyle | 41.41 | NB | Track record |
| Dave Collins Memorial Munster Oaks | 12 Sep | Waterford | Risk of Thunder | Lorraine Moore | 28.41 | NB | |
| Irish Cesarewitch | 24 Oct | Mullingar | Meenagh Miracle | Michael Corr | 32.75 | NB | Track record |
| IGOBF National Puppy | 5 Dec | Shelbourne | Ballymac Ariel | Liam Dowling | 28.19 | 13-8 | |
| Irish Grand National | 12 Dec | Cork | Razldazl Annie | Neilus O'Connell | 29.37 | NB | |
| Kingdom Derby | 22 Dec | Tralee | Knocknaboul Syd | Pat Buckley | 28.30 | 4-1 | |
| Kirby Memorial Stakes | | Limerick | cancelled+ | | | | |
| Dundalk International | | Dundalk | cancelled+ | | | | |
| Juvenile Classic | | Tralee | cancelled+ | | | | |
| Shelbourne 600 | | Shelbourne | cancelled+ | | | | |
| McCalmont Cup | | Kilkenny | cancelled+ | | | | |
| Select Stakes | | Waterford | cancelled+ | | | | |
| Race of Champions | | Tralee | cancelled+ | | | | |
| Texacloth Juvenile Derby | | Newbridge | cancelled+ | | | | |

+ Cancelled due to COVID-19 pandemic.
