= Guys and Dolls (greyhounds) =

Former greyhound racing competition

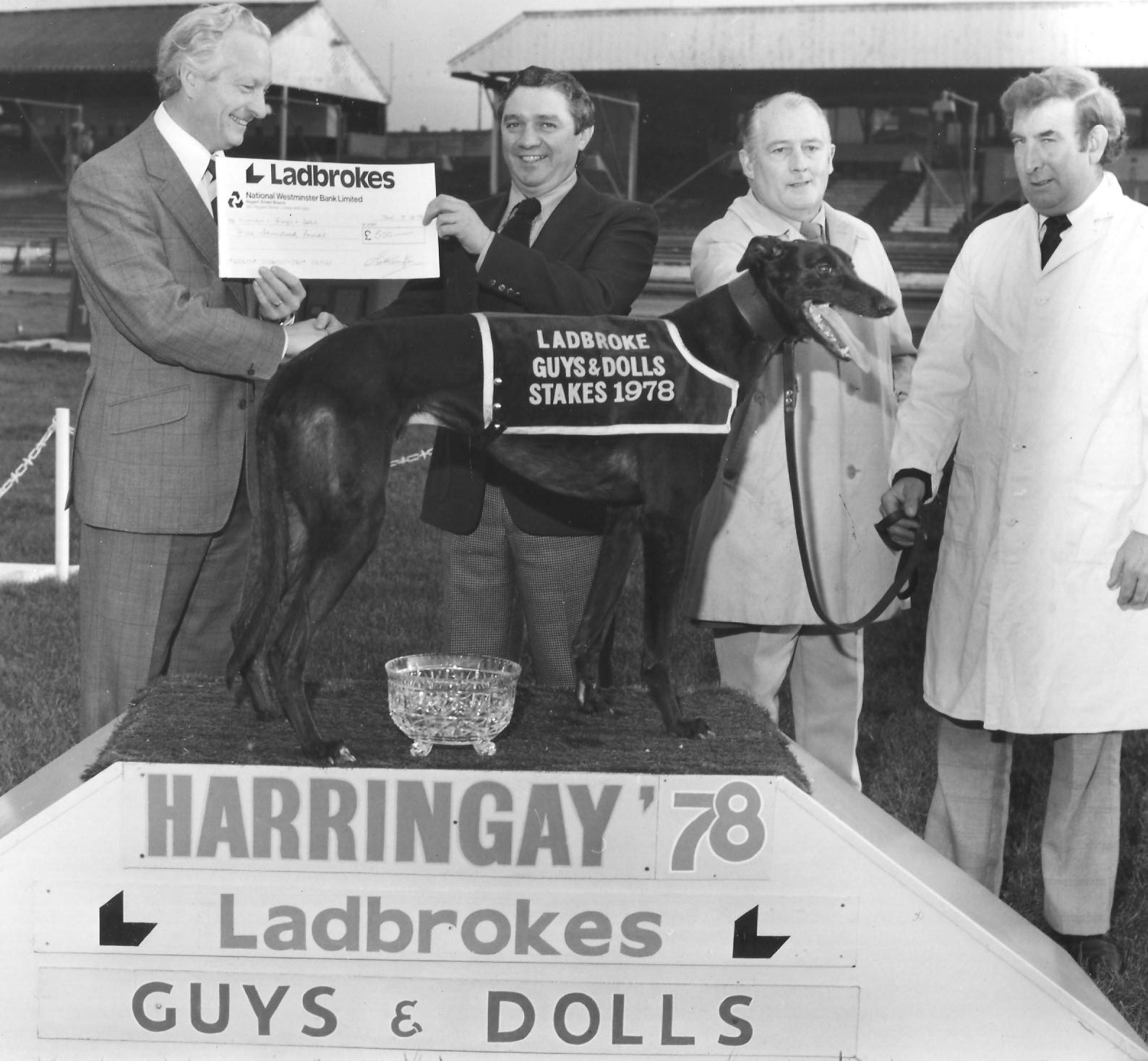
- 1978 champion Paradise Spectre
- Class: Category 2
- Location: Harringay (1977–1982); Wembley (1983–1984); Powderhall (1987–1987); Romford (2020); Crayford (1990–2019 & 2021–2024)
- Inaugurated: 1977
- Final run: 2024

Race information
- Surface: Sand
- Qualification: Dogs and bitches in separate heats

The Guys and Dolls was a greyhound racing competition held annually.

The competition was inaugurated at Harringay Stadium and was unusual in the fact that the heats consisted of separate races for bitches and dogs with heat winners qualifying for the mixed final. The event was historically sponsored by bookmakers and featured as a major televised race for the betting shops. It switched to Wmebley from Harringay in 1983, to Powderhall Stadium in 1987 and then Crayford until 2008 before being discontinued. In 2015 the race was brought back alongside the Gold Collar.

The event was held at sister track Romford Greyhound Stadium in 2020 because of the COVID-19 pandemic. The competition ended with the closure of Crayford Stadium in 2024.

== Venues & Distances ==
- 1977–1982 (Harringay, 660 metres)
- 1983–1984 (Wembley, 490 metres)
- 1987–1987 (Powderhall, 465 metres)
- 1990–2019 (Crayford, 380 metres)
- 2020–2020 (Romford, 400 metres)
- 2021–2024 (Crayford, 380 metres)

== Sponsors ==
- 1977–1984 (Ladbrokes)
- 1987–1987 (William Hill)
- 1990–1993 (Ladbrokes)
- 1994–1995 (Bass Brewery)
- 2002–2005 (Countrywide Steel and Tubes)
- 2006–2006 (Platform Building Materials)
- 2007–2024 (Ladbrokes)

== Past winners ==
Year	Winner	Breeding	Trainer	Time	SP	Notes/ref
1977	Glen Robin	Monalee Champion – Fit Me In	Randy Singleton (White City - London)	41.62	11/10f	
1978	Paradise Spectre	Spectre II – Paradise Wonder	Pat Mullins (Private)	40.85		
1979	Palestine Pride	Sole Aim – Palestine Miss	Bertie Gaynor (Perry Barr)		4/1	
1980	Decoy Duke	Westmead County – Rip Madam	Joe Cobbold (Private)		4/1	
1981	Candlemaker	Dempsey Duke – Perfect Rhythm	Gunner Smith (Brighton)	40.78	13/8	
1982	Westmead Badger	Wired to Moon – Westmead Satin	Natalie Savva (Cambridge)	40.48	9/4	
1983	Athlacca Glitter	Prince of Gold – Athlacca Speech			16/1	
1984	Ebony Tim	Brush Tim – Marys Princess	Grace Peppercorn (Private)	29.47	4/5f	
1985–1986, not held
1987	Rashane Glory	Brief Candle – Rashane Star	Hugh Davies (Powderhall)	28.53	4/1	
1988–1989, not held
1990	Clonlusk Villa	Storm Villa – Clonluck Dell	Hazel Dickson (Wembley)	23.56	6/4f	
1991	Gloun Pride	Hurry On Bran – Glour Eden	George Lang (Crayford)	23.87	20/1	
1992	Noisey Croppy	Double Bill – Drive On Lucky			2/1f	
1993	Kind of Magic	Kilshannig Sonny – Daisys Queen	Litzi Miller (Oxford)	23.71	11/10jf	
1994	Gun Fighter	I'm Slippy – Strange Manner	Bill Masters (Hove)	23.46	8/1	
1995	Reckless Champ	Leaders Minstrel – Movealong Una	Lorraine Sams (Rye House)	23.73	9/4f	
1996	Clean Paws	Arrow House – Must’nt Grumble	Lorraine King (Peterborough)	23.57	9/2	
1997	Corpo Election	Tapwatcher – No Thanks	Macmorough Mulkerrin (Private)	23.76	7/2	
1998	Wildbriar Hare	Slaneyside Hare – Gold Blossom	Terry Dartnall (Reading)	23.71	11/4	
1999	Chief Wigam	Murlens Hawk – Emmjay	Chris Duggan (Walthamstow)	23.84	9/2	
2000	Haut Brion	Boyne Walk – Still Seeker	Peter Rich (Romford)	23.79	2/1f	
2001	Lavender Prince	Come on Ranger – Droopys Juliet	Linda Jones (Walthamstow)	23.65	5/1	
2002	Knockeevan Hollie	Knockeevan Star – Knockeevan Lucy	Paul Young (Romford)	23.22	5/4f	
2003	Kingdom Club	Come on Ranger – Queen Nikita	Patsy Cusack (Crayford)	23.01	5/1	Track record
2004	Shes Our Star	Knockeevan Star – Shadow Flash	Paul Young (Romford)	23.17	9/4jf	
2005	Thank You Madam	Roanokee – Churchtown Spice	Graham Brabon (Sittingbourne)	23.38	11/4	
2006	Letmekissya	Deenside Dean - Letmeinga	John Davidson (Crayford)	23.47	6/4f	
2007	Horseshoe Ping	Top Honcho – Lucy May	Jim Reynolds (Romford)	23.14	1/1f	
2008	Me Buddy	Ballymac Maeve – Ballymac Peg	Matt Dartnall (Private)	23.26	4/6f	
2009–2014, not held
2015	Headford Joe	Lughill Jo – Teddy Hoe	Katie O'Flaherty (Crayford)	23.13	9/4	
2016	Brick Mansions	Godsend – Castlebride Jane	Katie O'Flaherty (Crayford)	23.22	4/1	
2017	Pure Placere	Superior Product – Pure Perception	Arun Green (Crayford)	23.09	3/1cf	
2018	Kilmore Lemon	Taylors Sky – Lemon Lucy	Patrick Janssens (Towcester)	22.89	1/2f	
2019	Skip Mayo	Makeshift – Boynepark Brae	Gemma Davidson (Central Park)	23.11	20/1	
2020	Melodys Secret	Laughil Blake – Melodys Diamond	Spencer Mavrias (Harlow)	24.32	11/1	
2021	Punk Rock Doll	Pat C Sabbath – Highview Jayne	Stuart Maplesden (Hove)	23.00	4/1	
2022	Icaals Rocco	Pat C Sabbath – Quivers Duchess	John Mullins (Towcester)	23.16	3/1	
2023	Swift Daisy	Broadstrand Bono – Swift Cigarette	Jean Liles (Romford)	23.18	7/2	
2024	Mini Eva	Ballymac Bolger – Rappers Molly	David Lee (Crayford)	23.06	5/2f	
