= Shelbourne Gold Cup =

Annual greyhound racing competition

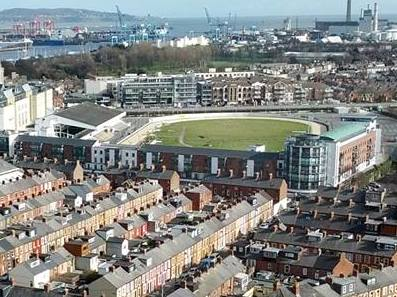
- Shelbourne Park, home of the Gold Cup
- Class: Feature
- Location: Shelbourne Park
- Inaugurated: 1998
- Sponsor: Tote

Race information
- Distance: 525 yards
- Surface: Sand
- Purse: €16,000 (winner)

The Gold Cup is a greyhound racing competition held annually at Shelbourne Park in Dublin, Ireland. The event was inaugurated in 1998 when the track's totalisator provider called Tote agreed to sponsor a 48 runner event with a £5,000 first prize.

== Venues and distances ==
- 1998–2010 (Shelbourne Park, 525y)
- 2011–2012 (Shelbourne Park, 550y)
- 2013–present (Shelbourne Park, 525y)

== Sponsors ==
- 1998–2011, 2014–2015, 2024 (Tote)
- 2012–2013 (Satellite Information Services (SIS))
- 2016–2021 (Best Car Parks)
- 2022–2022 (Rásaíocht Con Éireann Traceability System)
- 2023–2023 (Paddy Kehoe Suspended Ceilings)

== Past winners ==
Year	Winner	Breeding	Trainer	SP	Time (sec)	Notes/ref
1998	Real Branch	Right Move UK – New Branch	Denis Shanahan	4/5f	28.98	
1999	April Surprise	Beaming Surprise – Serene Lady	Paul Hennessy	5/2jf	28.85	
2000	Joannestown Cash	Cry Dalcash – Ali Sheba	Paul Hennessy	6/4f	29.00	
2001	Late Late Show	Spiral Nikita – Ullid Citrate	Paul Hennessy	1/2f	28.77	
2002	Jet Spray	Kilmessan Jet – Roving Mindy	Francie Murray	7/4	28.77	
2003	Clover Hare	Vintage Prince – CailinDilis	Michael O'Donovan	2/1	28.52	
2004	First Charter	Jamella Prince – Newbridge Girl	Reggie Roberts	5/2	29.66	
2005	Tyrur Ted	Top Honcho – Watch the Market	Paul Hennessy	11/8	28.25	
2006	Mineola Farloe	Top Honcho – Farloe Dingle	Seamus Graham	9/4f	28.38	
2007	Ballyhoe Marble	Mustang Yank – Ballyhoe Pivotal	Francie Murray	1/1f	28.32	
2008	Tyrur Kenny	Top Honcho – Tyrur Pearl	Paul Hennessy	25/1	28.86	
2009	Swords Prince	Head Bound – Katie King	Brian Madigan	2/1f	28.44	
2010	De Ex Factor	Crash – Late Delivery	Paul Hennessy	6/1	28.38	
2011	Slippery Bob	Top Honcho – Steamy Windows	Larry Dunne	3/1	29.86	
2012	Piercestown Sand	Ace Hi Rumble – Tyford Blackie	Shanks Whelan	8/1	29.71	
2013	Priceless Sky	Royal Impact – Priceless Pearl	Paul Hennessy	7/1	28.91	
2014	Kilgraney Tomson	Aries Son – Lady Kilgraney	Mary Buggy	5/1	28.48	
2015	Fiery Splendour	Tubbertelly Dubh – Any Time Again	Owen McKenna	5/4f	28.38	
2016	Slippery Fred	Brett Lee – Steamy Windows	Larry Dunne	6/4f	28.62	
2017	cancelled due to protests by the DGOBA over the February closure of Harold's Cross Stadium					
2018	Chespirito	Vulturi – Coolavanny Angie	Liam Dowling	7/1	28.53	
2019	Music Toour Ears	Droopys Jet – Glideaway Marina	Patrick Guilfoyle	7/2	28.33	
2020	Ballymac Anton	Ballymac Best – Coolavanny Angie	Liam Dowling	7/4f	28.87	
2021	Inforapenny	Farloe Rumble – Rios Girl	Kieran Lynch	5/1	28.97	
2022	Skywalker Barry	Droopys Jet – Calzaghe Jan	Michael J O' Donovan	2/1	28.36	
2023	Bogger Hunter	Skywalker Farloe – Bottle of Banter	Ian Reilly	9/1	28.52	
2024	Boylesports Coco	Droopys Sydney – Barn Swallow	Dolores Ruth	7/4f	28.52	
2025	Seven Beach	Pestana Whitings – Gift	Jennifer O'Donnell	4/1	28.52	
2026	Coloursaregreen	King Sheeran – Magical Mary	Paul Hennessy	17/2	28.38	
