= 2017 English Greyhound Derby =

Greyhound racing event

- Location: Towcester Greyhound Stadium
- Start date: 1 June
- End date: 1 July
- Total prize money: £175,000 (winner)

The 2017 Star Sports Greyhound Derby took place during June and July and the final was held on 1 July 2017 at Towcester Greyhound Stadium.

It was the first time since 1984 that the event was held away from Wimbledon Stadium and the first time in its history that it was held outside of London. The competition was sponsored by bookmaker Star Sports for the first time with a winner's prize of £175,000. The winner was Astute Missile who was the outsider at 28-1, his owner Geoff Hill won £175,000.

== Final ==
At Towcester (over 500 metres):

Position	Name of Greyhound	Breeding	Trap	Sectional	Race comment	SP	Time	Trainer
1st	Astute Missile	Kinloch Brae - China Doll	4	5.18	VQAw,Bmp&Led3	28-1	28.92	Seamus Cahill (Hove)
2nd	Tyrur Shay	Big Daddy Cool - Black Eyed Boss	5	5.28	RanOn	7-4	28.98	Patrick 'PJ' Fahy (Ireland)
3rd	Clares Rocket	Confident Rankin - Lemon Madrid	3	5.27	EP,Bmp4	6-4f	29.35	Graham Holland (Ireland)
4th	Murrys Act	Tullymurry Act - Brave Meave	6	5.44	VSAw	14-1	29.46	Kevin Boon (Yarmouth)
5th	Droopys Acrobat	Tullymurry Act - Droopys Blossom	2	5.28	Blk2&3	8-1	29.60	Seamus Cahill (Hove)
6th	Hiya Butt	Hondo Black - Hather For Pat	1	5.23	Led1To3,Bmp,Bmp4	9-2	29.64	Hayley Keightley (Private)

=== Distances ===
¾, 4½, 1¼, 1¾, ½ (lengths)
The distances between the greyhounds are in finishing order and shown in lengths. One length is equal to 0.08 of one second.

=== Race Report ===
Astute Missile broke very well from the traps alongside Hiya Butt, who produced his trademark early pace, to lead from the first bend until the third bend. Astute Missile then forced his way inside Hiya Butt at the third bend, the latter received a small bump at this stage and then tired into last place. Astute Missile went on to win from a strong finishing Tyrur Shay and the previously unbeaten Clares Rocket finished third after failing to make the fast start that was expected of him.

== Semi finals ==
First Semi Final (Jun 24, £5,000)
Pos	Name of Greyhound	SP	Time	Trainer
1st	Hiya Butt	5-2jf	29.17	Keightley
2nd	Droopys Acrobat	6-1	29.23	Cahill
3rd	Murrys Act	10-1	29.25	Boon
4th	Droopys Buick	10-1	29.37	Harrison
5th	Bruisers Bullet	5-2jf	29.54	Wallis
6th	Forest Con	11-2	29.68	Cahill

Second Semi Final (Jun 24, £5,000)
Pos	Name of Greyhound	SP	Time	Trainer
1st	Clares Rocket	10-11f	28.83	Holland
2nd	Tyrur Shay	13-8	28.96	Fahy
3rd	Astute Missile	20-1	28.98	Cahill
4th	Sallows Ford	50-1	29.25	White
5th	Swithuns Brae	9-1	29.42	Cronin
6th	Coolavanny Mason	10-1	29.56	Buckley

== Quarter finals ==
Heat 1 (Jun 20, £1,000)
Pos	Name	SP	Time
1st	Clares Rocket	13-8f	28.99
2nd	Astute Missile	12-1	29.35
3rd	Bruisers Bullet	7-4	29.69
4th	Shaneboy Freddie	13-2	29.78
5th	Fweshfromthesesh	7-1	29.89
6th	Ballinakil Clare	10-1	29.96

Heat 2 (Jun 20, £1,000)
Pos	Name	SP	Time
1st	Swithins Brae	9-2	29.29
2nd	Forest Con	2-1	29.63
3rd	Droopys Buick	5-4f	29.66
4th	Newinn Blitz	20-1	29.69
5th	Crossfield Hugo	20-1	30.13
6th	Carn Brea	7-1	30.16

Heat 3 (Jun 20, £1,000)
Pos	Name	SP	Time
1st	Droopys Acrobat	4-1	29.02
2nd	Sallows Ford	12-1	29.28
3rd	Murrys Act	4-1	29.49
4th	Danzey Exception	5-2jf	29.55
5th	Cable Bay	6-1	29.97
6th	Pacey Bambi	5-2jf	30.01

Heat 4 (Jun 20, £1,000)
Pos	Name	SP	Time
1st	Tyrur Shay	4-5f	29.02
2nd	Hiya Butt	3-1	29.07
3rd	Coolavanny Mason	6-1	29.09
4th	Airport Jumbo	50-1	29.33
5th	Jaytee Jet	9-2	29.36
6th	Slaheny King	25-1	30.05

== See also ==
- 2017 UK & Ireland Greyhound Racing Year
