= Crayford Stadium =

Former British greyhound racing venue

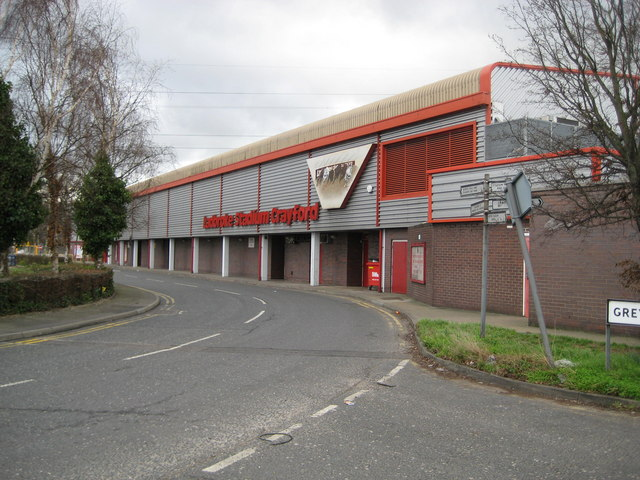
- The entrance in 2008
- Interactive map of Crayford Stadium
- Location: Bexley, Greater London, England
- Coordinates: 51.448°N 0.17629°E
- Operator: Entain (Ladbrokes Coral)

Construction
- Opened: 1986
- Closed: 2025

Website
- Official website

Crayford Stadium was a greyhound racing stadium located in the London Borough of Bexley in England. The stadium, which featured races from 1986 to 2025, had private suites, a restaurant and a number of bars.

Evening meetings took place every Tuesday and Sunday, with matinée race meetings taking place on Thursday, Friday and Saturday. Crayford was owned by Ladbrokes Coral, a subsidiary of Entain. The stadium ceased racing after the 19 January 2025 meeting.

== History ==
=== 1980s ===
In 1984 Ladbrokes announced that racing would cease at the Crayford & Bexleyheath Stadium following the sale of part of the site to Sainsbury's. The sale also included plans for rebuilding the entire stadium on the west side of the closing stadium. Five acres of the twenty-acre site would be converted into a new greyhound track and sports stadium. Racing ended on 18 May 1985 and work began on the new stadium. Following sixteen months of development and construction, it was ready for action. The press falsely claimed it was the first greyhound track to be built for 30 years because several had been constructed within the previous decade including Nottingham and Reading.

The grand opening took place on 1 September 1986, and the new stadium would be called Crayford after the decision was made to drop the Bexleyheath part; the stadium was situated in a different five-acre part of the original twenty acres. The stadium was opened by the mayor of Bexley and Ladbrokes Chairman Cyril Stein.

In 1987 the track took possession of a major competition called the Golden Jacket which had struggled to find a new home since the demise of Harringay. The event had been temporarily held at Hall Green and Monmore and was a popular afternoon competition with television exposure. Crayford also provided a new matinee meeting for their Ladbrokes betting shops and another new competition called the Crayford Rosebowl was inaugurated. In 1988 Dinky Luckhurst trained Breeks Rocket to Grand National success.

The dimensions of the all-sand circuit were a small 334 m circumference with distances of 380, 540, 714 and 874 metres with an outside Sumner hare. Facilities included a restaurant for 138 covers, two bars and a twin-tier glass-fronted covered stand. Also within the stadium was a sports hall complex, a fitness area and a swimming pool. The racing manager was Roy Dwight and general manager Roger Lakey, soon to be replaced by Paul Lawrence and Barry Stanton respectively.

=== 1990s ===
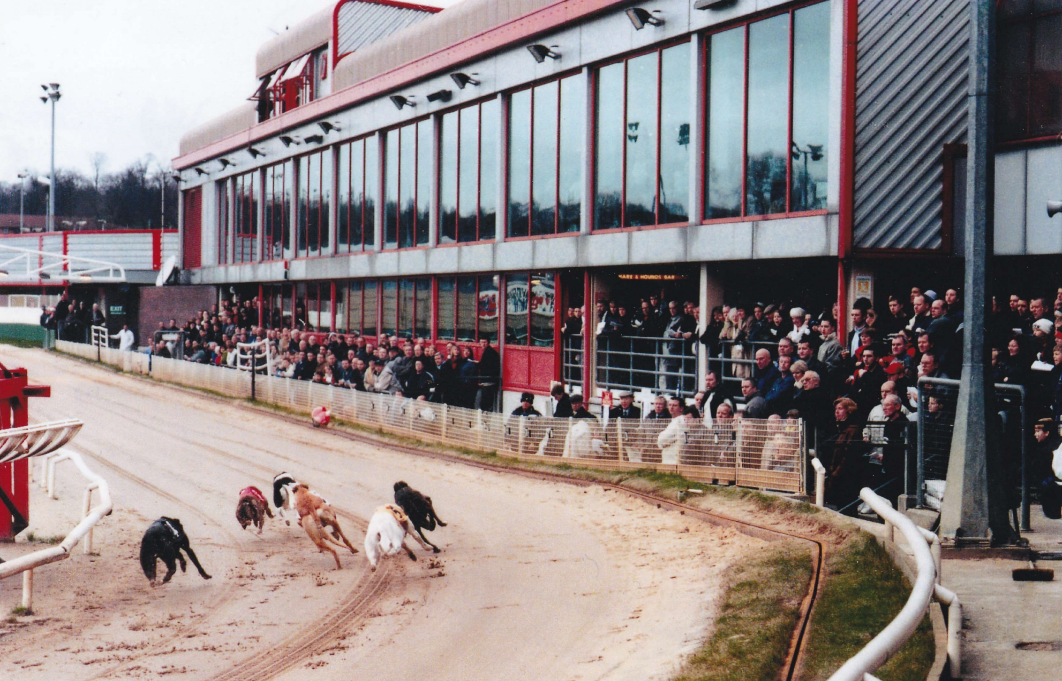
Crayford Ladbrokes Greyhound Stadium c.1990

In 1996 Dynamic Display repeated the Grand National achievement for trainer Barry O'Sullivan. The Guys and Dolls competition arrived at the track in 1997. Pure Patches won the 1998 Gold Collar and also made the 1999 English Greyhound Derby final and Bubbly Prince won the 1999 Cesarewitch.

=== 2000s ===
Lady Jean won the 2000 Cesarewitch, and Haughty Ted won the 2001 Gold Collar for Dinky Luckhurst. Racing manager Paul Lawrence parted company with the track in 2000, replaced by Harry Bull, with Danny Rayment promoted to deputy. Rayment went on to replace Bull as racing manager in 2006. Trainer Lorraine Sams introduced a greyhound to the industry in 2006 called Spiridon Louis. The black-and-white dog would become the 2007 Greyhound of the Year after winning the St Leger, TV Trophy and Regency.

=== 2010s ===
A third Grand National win by the Gemma Davidson-trained Plane Daddy, in 2010, continued Crayford's success with hurdle racing.

In 2015 the track resurrected the original classic Gold Collar competition and the Guys and Dolls. In 2017 Ladbrokes merged with Gala Coral to form Ladbrokes Coral.

In 2018, the stadium signed a deal with SIS to race every Tuesday morning and evening, Thursday afternoon, Friday morning and Saturday morning.

=== 2020s ===
In 2022, Entain signed a long-term deal with the Arena Racing Company for media rights, starting in January 2024. In 2023, the stadium held the Champion Hurdle for the first time. In 2024, Crayford trainer Ricky Holloway won the Golden Jacket with Dazl Rolex, the first home victory since 2007.

== Closure ==
In November 2024 Entain announced their intention to close the stadium, stating that "it is no longer viable for us to continue operating the site". The stadium closed down after the final meeting, which was held on 19 January 2025.

== Competitions ==
=== Crayford/Kent Vase ===
| Year | Winner | Breeding | Trainer | Time (sec) | SP | Notes/ref |
|---|---|---|---|---|---|---|
| 1967 | Millies Valley | Pigalle Wonder – Racing Millie | Gordon Hodson (White City) | 29.17 | | |
| 1968 | Ambiguous | Crazy Parachute – The Mistress | Paddy McEvoy (Wimbledon) | 29.10 | 5/2 | |
| 1969 | Quarrymount Bill | Boro Parachute – Ballinasloe Judy | Frank Melville Harringay) | 28.69 | 10/1 | |
| 1970 | Lord Phil | Lucky Wonder – Lachienne | Dennis Mansfield (Southend) | 29.21 | 7/2 | |
| 1971 | Mad Risk | Carry On Oregon – Mad Girl | Charlie Coyle (Private) | 28.77 | 4/1 | |
| 1972 | Fragrant Flyer | Prince of Roses – Forest Brown | Bill Westcott (Crayford & Bexleyheath) | 28.41 | 11/10f | |
| 1973 | Kilmac Chieftan | Own Pride – Stolen Tilly | Vernon Ford (Private) | 28.58 | 5/4 | |
| 1974 | Money Again | Clomoney Jet – Leades Again | John Coleman (Wembley) | 28.92 | 16/1 | |
| 1975 | London Spec | Spectre II – Hi Lasinagh | Pat Mullins (Ipswich) | 28.41 | 5/4 | |
| 1976 | Gin And Jass | Kilbeg Kuda – Liberty Bell | Dave Drinkwater (Rye House) | 28.54 | 9/4 | |
| 1977 | Colonel Pearloma | Lively Band – Certral | John Coleman (Wembley) | 28.70 | 1/1f | |
| 1978 | Proud Time | Time Up Please – Girvin Kate | John Gibbons (Private) | 28.40 | 7/2 | |
| 1979 | Fearna Cobbler | Cobbler – Aidans Lady | John Sherry (Walthamstow) | 28.38 | 5/2 | |
| 1980 | Johns Luck | Westmead Bounty – Kiltean Fawn | John Coleman (Wembley) | 28.47 | 4/1 | |
| 1981 | Deel Joker | Free Speech – Leaping Lady | John Gibbons (Crayford & Bexleyheath) | 28.11 | 4/6f | |
| 1982 | General Fun | Laurdella Fun – Satin Sash | Terry Duggan (Romford) | 29.02 | 7/1 | |
| 1983 | Sammy Bear (dead-heat) | Mexican Chief – Lady Laurdella | George Curtis (Brighton) | 28.53 | 5/2jf | |
| 1983 | Cashen Son (dead-heat) | Jimsun – Minty Lady | George Curtis (Brighton) | 28.53 | 5/1 | |
| 1984 | Gortatlea Brigg | Noble Brigg – Lartigue Rose | Michael Gallagher (Rye House) | 28.17 | 10/1 | |
1985-1986, not held (closure and subsequent rebuilding of new stadium
| 1987 | Sand Streak | Sand Man – Rapid Lady | David Ingram-Seal (Ramsgate) | 34.68 | 8/1 | |
| 1988 | Foretop | Blue Train – Green Slieve | Kenny Linzell (Walthamstow) | 34.59 | 4/6f | |
| 1989 | Fennessys Gold | Soda Fountain – Fast Mission | Ray Peacock (Catford) | 34.33 | 4/5f | |
| 1990 | Hello Blackie | Daleys Gold – Ashcarne Chips | Roger York (Hackney) | 34.12 | 1/4f | |
| 1991 | Appleby Lisa | Whisper Wishes – Moon Bran | Harry Dodds (Norton Canes) | 34.87 | 8/1 | |
| 1992 | Ballarue Hove | Curryhills Fox – Ballarue Suzy | Derek Knight (Hove) | 33.98 | 7/2 | |
| 1993 | Ardcollum Hilda | Druids Johno – Seventh Dynamic | Patsy Byrne (Wimbledon) | 33.87 | 2/5f | |
| 1994 | Ashfield Arrow | Slippys Quest – Alf Arrow | Bill Masters (Hove) | | | |
| 1995 | Heaven Sent | Lodge Prince – Murlens Mandy | Peter Rich (Romford) | 34.05 | 4/1 | |
| 1996 | El Tenor | Ratify – Ballygar Rose | Linda Mullins (Walthamstow) | 33.81 | 7/4f | |
| 1997 | El Tenor | Ratify – Ballygar Rose | Linda Mullins (Walthamstow) | 33.83 | 10/11f | |
| 1998 | Rio Shadow | Adraville Bridge – Droopys Aliysa | Daniel Riordan (Harlow) | 34.45 | 5/4f | |
| 1999 | Lake Shadow | Come on Ranger – Lake Tricks | Dinky Luckhurst (Crayford) | 34.64 | 7/4f | |
| 2000 | Baby Courtney | Slipaway Jaydee – Lady Little | Les Lawrence (Harlow) | 34.47 | 5/4f | |
| 2001 | Little Vintage | Vintage Prince – Treasure Beo | Linda Jones (Walthamstow) | 33.77 | 11/4 | |
| 2002 | Top Power | Top Honcho – Able Ivy | Linda Jones (Walthamstow) | 33.93 | 5/4f | |
| 2003 | Droopys Regina | Top Honcho – Doopys Kylie | Gary Sallis (Private) | 33.63 | 6/1 | |
| 2004 | Topmeup | Carlton Bale – Metric Flower | Paul Garland (Wimbledon) | 33.89 | 3/1jf | |
| 2005 | Merton Flower | Top Honcho – Metric Flower | Paul Garland (Wimbledon) | 33.68 | 4/5f | |
| 2006 | Xamax Johndee | Droopys Kewell – Xamax Xylograph | John Davidson (Crayford) | 33.87 | 6/1 | |
| 2007 | Fear Martina | Never Give Up – Expert View | Steve Willey (Sittingbourne) | 33.75 | 2/1jf | |
| 2008 | Barnfield Slippy | Crash – Blues Best Buzz | Sam Poots (Private) | 33.25 | 1/2f | |
| 2010 | Freedom Cody | Pacific Mile – Synone Starlight | Matt Dartnall (Private) | 33.66 | 6/4f | |
| 2019 | Crossfield Vince | Kinloch Brae – Crossfield Alba | Julie Luckhurst (Crayford) | 33.81 | 3/1 | |
| 2020 | cancelled due to COVID-19 pandemic | | | | | |
| 2021 | Ballynabee Jet | Sh Avatar – Monleek Dawn | Samantha West (Hove) | 34.03 | 100/30 | |
| 2022 | Bandicoot Sammy | Droopys Sydney – Samiya | Ron Grey (Private) | 33.90 | 5/1 | |
| 2023 | Beebee Bianco | Droopys Sydney – Clounamon Diva | Julie Luckhurst (Crayford) | 34.22 | 8/1 | |
| 2024 | Kuda Honey | Magical Bale – Brynoffa Honey | Jean Liles (Romford) | 34.01 | 6/1 | |

(1967–1984 held at Crayford & Bexleyheath over 490 yards/462 metres), (1987–2010 held at Crayford over 540 metres)

=== Crayford/Kent Rosebowl ===
| Year | Winner | Breeding | Trainer | Time (sec) | SP | Notes/ref |
|---|---|---|---|---|---|---|
| 1987 | Lisnakill Ruby | I'm Slippy – Midland Mist | Linda Mullins (Crayford) | 25.46 | | |
| 1990 | Clonlusk Villa | Strom Villa – Clonlusk Dell | Hazel Dickson (Wembley) | 23.93 | 2/1 | |
| 1993 | Loch Bo Lucky | I'm Slippy – Loch Bo Goldie | John Coleman (Walthamstow) | 23.78 | 4/1 | |
| 1994 | Lemon Raider | I'm Slippy – Lemon Miss | John McGee Sr. (Hackney) | 23.33 | 6/4jf | |
| 1995 | Dongadong | Deenside Spark – Keltic Cracker | Chris Duggan (Walthamstow) | 24.18 | | |
| 1997 | Kiel Casino | Daleys Gold – Kiel Glory | Roy Towner (Crayford) | 23.70 | 14/1 | |
| 1998 | Curryhills Steve | Cool Prince – Iona Lass | Linda Jones (Romford) | 24.28 | 10/1 | |
| 1999 | Dower Diamond | Highway Leader – Dower Celt | Roy Towner (Crayford) | 24.05 | 5/2 | |
| 2000 | Respect | New Level – Hello Gorgeous | x | 23.91 | 8/1 | |
| 2001 | Marinas Pride | Thorgil Tex – Marinas Machine | Pat Thompson (Crayford) | 23.86 | 7/4jf | |
| 2002 | Silver Tail | Roanokee – Ardera Melody | Diane Platts (Rye House) | 23.22 | 5/1 | |
| 2003 | Patchit | Cool Performance – Chartwell Flyer | Patsy Cusack (Crayford) | 23.30 | 11/4jf | |
| 2004 | Rockmount Gael | Prince of Tinrah – Slaney Lady | Dinky Luckhurst (Crayford) | 23.47 | 11/4 | |
| 2005 | Lenson Ace | Judicial Pride – Any Time Soon | Seamus Cahill (Wimbledon) | 23.83 | 2/1f | |
| 2006 | Lenson Ace | Judicial Pride – Any Time Soon | Seamus Cahill (Wimbledon) | 23.68 | 2/1f | |
| 2007 | Xamax Johndee | Droopys Kewell – Xamax Xylograph | John Davidson (Crayford) | 23.95 | 5/4f | |
| 2008 | Farloe Nipper | Droopys Kewell – Farloe Edge | Arun Green (Crayford) | 23.54 | 6/1 | |
| 2009 | Ardbeg Kate | Daves Mentor – Farantane Sinead | Michael Fawsitt (Private) | 23.10 | 4/5f | |
| 2010 | Me Buddy | Ballymac Maeve – Ballymac Peg | Matt Dartnall (Private) | 23.64 | 2/1 | |
| 2011 | Ministry Mayhem | Ballymac Maeve – Lady Freckles | Kelly Findlay (Private) | 23.63 | 4/5f | |
| 2012 | Selkirk Souter | Boherduff Light – Memphis May | Julie Luckhurst (Crayford) | 23.35 | 6/1 | |
| 2013 | Murlens Crash | Crash – Murlens Snowdrop | Mark Wallis (Yarmouth) | 23.33 | 7/2 | |
| 2019 | Sleepy Genie | Laughil Blake – Whiteys Buddelia | David Puddy (Harlow) | 23.29 | 4/9f | |
| 2020 | Signature Callum | Tullymurry Act – Franks Dream | Michelle Brown (Henlow) | 23.43 | 6/4f | |
| 2021 | Icaals Rocco | Pat C Sabbath – Quivers Duchess | John Mullins (Towcester) | 23.38 | 8/1 | |
| 2022 | Adeles Duke | Good News – Tullovin Fire | Diane Henry (Towcester) | 23.27 | 6/4f | |
| 2023 | Oh Cosmopolitan | Laughil Blake – Ballykett Beauty | John Mullins (Towcester) | 23.28 | 9/2 | |
| 2024 | Yahoo Megan | Droopys Sydney – Geelo Gold Dust | Patrick Janssens (Towcester) | 23.13 | 15/8f | |

(held over 380 metres)

== Track records ==
=== Current ===
| Metres | Greyhound | Time | Date | Notes |
|---|---|---|---|---|
| 380 | Brinkleys Poet | 22.85 | 29.05.2018 | |
| 540 | Aayamza Sydney | 32.85 | 24 November 2024 | Gold Collar final |
| 714 | Stardom | 44.52 | 24 August 2019 | |
| 874 | Burgess Borna | 55.89 | 26 December 2014 | |
| 1048 | Roxholme Magic | 67.83 | 21 February 2017 | |
| 380 H | Lenson Doolin | 23.10 | 15 April 2023 | Champion Hurdle final |
| 540 H | Razldazl Raidio | 33.57 | 21 February 2017 | |

=== Former ===
Extended content

| Metres | Greyhound | Time (sec) | Date | Notes |
|---|---|---|---|---|
| 380 | Justa Mo | 23.66 | 9 May 1987 | |
| 380 | Sail on Delaney | 23.53 | 28 January 1989 | |
| 380 | Clonlusk Villa | 23.46 | 26 January 1991 | |
| 380 | Genotin Laura | 23.31 | 17 May 1993 | |
| 380 | Lots of Jolly | 23.31 | 16 July 1994 | |
| 380 | Rossa Ranger | 23.36 | 15 April 2002 | |
| 380 | Chasing A Dream | 23.18 | 5 May 2002 | |
| 380 | Skibbs Flyer | 23.06 | 14 October 2002 | |
| 380 | Kingdom Club | 23.01 | 27 September 2003 | Guys and Dolls Final |
| 380 | Tictac Tyson | 22.97 | 7 May 2011 | |
| 380 | You Never Listen | 22.97 | 19 February 2015 | =equalled |
| 380 | Target Harris | 22.88 | 18 July 2015 | |
| 540 | Baby Pol | 34.01 | 4 August 1987 | |
| 540 | Hello Blackie | 33.93 | 11 August 1990 | |
| 540 | Side Wink | 33.46 | 9 January 1992 | |
| 540 | Break On Thru | 33.43 | 14 October 2002 | |
| 540 | Sportsman | 33.26 | 3 February 2003 | |
| 540 | Sunshine Sophie | 33.13 | 28 February 2004 | |
| 540 | Mayshighlandreel | 33.09 | 26 September 2017 | Gold Collar final |
| 714 | Favourite Return | 46.86 | 22 May 1987 | |
| 714 | Harry Lime | 46.17 | 31 August 1987 | |
| 714 | Fort Leader | 45.61 | 16 February 1989 | |
| 714 | Heavenly Lady | 45.25 | 8 February 1993 | |
| 714 | Blues Best Tayla | 45.19 | 24 February 2001 | |
| 714 | Rosden Image | 45.07 | 14 October 2002 | |
| 714 | Foreign Chick | 45.13 | 14 October 2002 | |
| 714 | Centour Corker | 45.02 | 3 February 2003 | |
| 714 | Centour Corker | 44.74 | 3 March 2003 | Golden Jacket Final |
| 714 | Double Take | 44.57 | 21 February 2004 | Golden Jacket semi-final |
| 874 | Astrosyn Trace | 57.21 | 26 October 1987 | |
| 874 | Clonbrin Black | 56.15 | 15 October 1993 | |
| 1048 | Stansted Flyer | 69.81 | 7 September 1996 | |
| 1048 | Musical Fawn | 68.80 | 22 February 2014 | |
| 1048 | Roxholme Magic | 68.59 | 23 February 2016 | |
| 380 H | Off You Sail | 24.29 | 15 June 1987 | |
| 380 H | Parktown Ranger | 23.96 | 21 January 1989 | |
| 380 H | Ladys Champion | 23.86 | 24 September 1994 | |
| 380 H | Dynamic Display | 23.70 | 1996 | |
| 380 H | Razldazl Raidio | 23.28 | 26 March 2016 | |
| 380 H | Razldazl Raidio | 23.18 | 8 October 2016 | |
| 380 H | Droopys Cruiser | 23.18 | 28 September 2019 | |
| 540 H | Breeks Rocket | 35.30 | 1988 | |
| 540 H | Cahara Gamble | 35.08 | 17 June 1991 | |
| 540 H | Cahara Gamble | 35.01 | 3 August 1991 | |
| 540 H | Rainys Pet | 34.85 | 10 August 1991 | |
| 540 H | Rainys Pet | 34.67 | 17 August 1991 | |
| 540 H | Sunshine Sandy | 34.32 | 11 March 1993 | |
| 540 H | El Tenor | 34.16 | 13 April 1998 | |
| 540 H | Selby Ben | 33.68 | 26 May 2003 | |
