= 2021 Irish Greyhound Derby =

2021 edition of the Irish Greyhound Derby competition

2021 Boylesports Irish Greyhound Derby
- Location: Shelbourne Park
- Start date: Friday 13 August
- End date: Saturday 18 September
- Competitors: 150
- Total prize money: €300,000 (winner €125,000)

The 2021 Boylesports Irish Greyhound Derby took place during August and September, with the final being held on 18 September at Shelbourne Park. The competition was sponsored by BoyleSports and the prize money purse was €300,000, of which €125,000 went to the winner.

The ante post favourites were Ballymac Ariel and Explosive Boy. The 2020 English Derby champion Deerjet Sydney and 2021 English Derby finalists Ballymac Fairone and Ballymac Wild all lined up.

The first round was held on 13 & 14 August, second round on 20 & 21 August, third round on 28 August, quarter finals on 4 September and semi finals on 11 September.

The winner was Susie Sapphire who won the first prize of €125,000, she was trained by Owen McKenna and owned and bred by Peter Comerford. Susie Sapphire went unbeaten through the event and was the first bitch to win the Derby since Spring Time at the 1999 Irish Greyhound Derby.

== Final result ==
At Shelbourne Park (over 550 yards):

Position	Greyhound	Breeding	Trap	Sectional	SP	Time	Comment	Trainer
1st	Susie Sapphire	Droopys Jet – Jetstream Lynx	1	3.18	2–1f	29.18	VQAw, ALed	Owen McKenna
2nd	Singalong Sally	Tullymurry Act – Droopys Smasher	2	3.46	10–1	29.39	Bmp 1, FinWell	Pat Buckley
3rd	Jackslittlething	Droopys Sydney – Limini	5	3.44	5–1	29.70	EvAw, Blk 1	Graham Holland
4th	Explosive Boy	Good News – Delightful Girl	4	3.45	9–4	29.98	EvAw, Blk 1	Patrick Guilfoyle
5th	All About Ted	Kinloch Brae – Enable	6	3.46	11–4	30.61	EvAw, BBlk 1	Peter Cronin
6th	Carrigeen North	Skywalker Puma – Dame Iris	3	3.43	40–1	31.10	EvAw, BBlk 1	Thomas Buggy

=== Distances ===
3, 4½, 4, 9, 7 (0.07 sec = one length)

== Quarter finals ==
Heat 1 (Sep 4)
Pos	Name	SP	Time
1st	Ballymac Ariel	7–4f	29.37
2nd	Explosive Boy	9–4	29.40
3rd	All About Ted	3–1	29.54
4th	Deerjet Sydney	9–2	29.75
5th	Galvarino	33–1	29.86
6th	Jazz Toes	20–1	30.14

Heat 2 (Sep 4)
Pos	Name	SP	Time
1st	Singalong Sally	9–2	29.70
2nd	Monraud Thunder	11–2	29.80
3rd	Gortkelly Nestor	7–2	30.01
4th	Rural Star	7–1	30.02
5th	No Green Dye	6–1	30.16
6th	Droopys Good	7–4f	30.48

Heat 3 (Sep 4)
Pos	Name	SP	Time
1st	Susie Sapphire	8–11f	29.48
2nd	Scooby Princess	6–1	29.49
3rd	Ballymac Fairone	6–1	29.52
4th	Swords Maestro	10–1	29.59
5th	Ballymac Wild	4–1	29.63
N/R	Re Sure		

Heat 4 (Sep 4)
Pos	Name	SP	Time
1st	Jackslittlething	4–5f	29.23
2nd	Carrigeen North	12–1	29.65
3rd	Priceless Jet	4–1	29.70
4th	Skywalker Cilla	5–2	29.74
5th	Brykar Oak	25–1	29.95
6th	Gunboat Showman	33–1	30.09

== Semi finals ==
First semi final (Sep 11)
Pos	Name of Greyhound	SP	Time	Trainer
1st	All About Ted	8–11f	29.23	Peter Cronin
2nd	Singalong Sally	6–1	29.51	Pat Buckley
3rd	Carrigeen North	8–1	29.68	Thomas Buggy
4th	Gortkelly Nestor	20–1	29.75	Andrew Murray
5th	Scooby Princess	4–1	29.77	Jennifer O'Donnell
6th	Monraud Thunder	10–1	30.16	Graham Holland

Second semi final (Sep 11)
Pos	Name of Greyhound	SP	Time	Trainer
1st	Susie Sapphire	11–4jf	29.34	Owen McKenna
2nd	Explosive Boy	3-1	29.44	Patrick Guilfoyle
3rd	Jackslittlething	3-1	29.45	Graham Holland
4th	Ballymac Fairone	20-1	29.66	Liam Dowling
5th	Ballymac Ariel	11-4jf	29.67	Liam Dowling
6th	Priceless Jet	9-1	30.06	Paul Hennessy

== Competition report ==
The first round process of cutting the field from 150 to 96 started on 13 August and saw Explosive Boy start his campaign with a 29.47 win, Ballymac Ariel (29.50), Ballymac Wild (29.66) and Ballymac Fairone (29.67) all scored wins but Jackslittlething recorded a sensational 29.10. Big names Glengar Bale and Ballymac Kingdom were both eliminated.

In the second round Jackslittlething won again (29.71) and this was soon followed by a win for Priceless Jet over De Machine (the Champion Stakes and Kirby Memorial Stakes winner). Oaks runner-up Scooby Princess impressed with a 29.40 on a slow track. The following night Jacob Tashadelek went well again (29.50) and Deerjet Sydney picked up his first win in 29.56. Oaks champion Susie Sapphire claimed a second win in 29.50 and this was followed by superb wins from Ballymac Ariel and Explosive Boy (both 29.40 winners). Deadly Destroyer won the final heat in 29.56.

The third round action was on 28 August and started with an impressive nine length victory for Ballymac Wild in 29.47. Skywalker Cilla took heat 2 (29.45) and Deerjet Sydney won the third heat in 29.75. In heat 4 Ballymac Ariel recorded the fastest time of the competition so far with a 29.07, Explosive Boy was 2nd and Priceless Jet 3rd in a tough race that saw Jacob Tashadelek knocked out. All About Ted then produced a 10 length win (29.35) with Deadly Destroyer eliminated. Carrigeen North and Jackslittlething won heats 7 & 8 and Susie Sapphire remained unbeaten by taking the last heat in 29.31.

The opening quarter final was the strongest of the four heats and resulted in a 29.37 win for Ballymac Ariel, the black bitch remained unbeaten and defeated the likes of Explosive Boy, All About Ted and Deerjet Sydney, with the latter unlucky to be eliminated bearing in mind he recorded 29.75 in fourth place. Another bitch, Singalong Sally caused a surprise by winning her first race of the competition to take a much weaker heat 2. Susie Sapphire then won heat 3 to remain unbeaten and make it three wins for bitches in a heat that saw Ballymac Wild's challenge end. Jackslittlething recorded 29.23 in the final heat.

The semi final draw threw up a contrasting two heats, the second containing most of the favourites. Heat 1 saw All About Ted ease to victory with a 4 length victory ahead of Singalong Sally and Carrigeen North in 29.23. Susie Sapphire led all the way to win the second semi final ahead of Explosive Boy and the previously unbeaten Jackslittlething. The Liam Dowling pair of Ballymac Fairone and Ballymac Ariel were 4th and 5th (the unbeaten Ariel was unlucky after finding trouble) and Priceless Jet brought up the rear.

== See also ==
- 2021 UK & Ireland Greyhound Racing Year
