= Grand National (English greyhound race) =

English greyhound racing competition

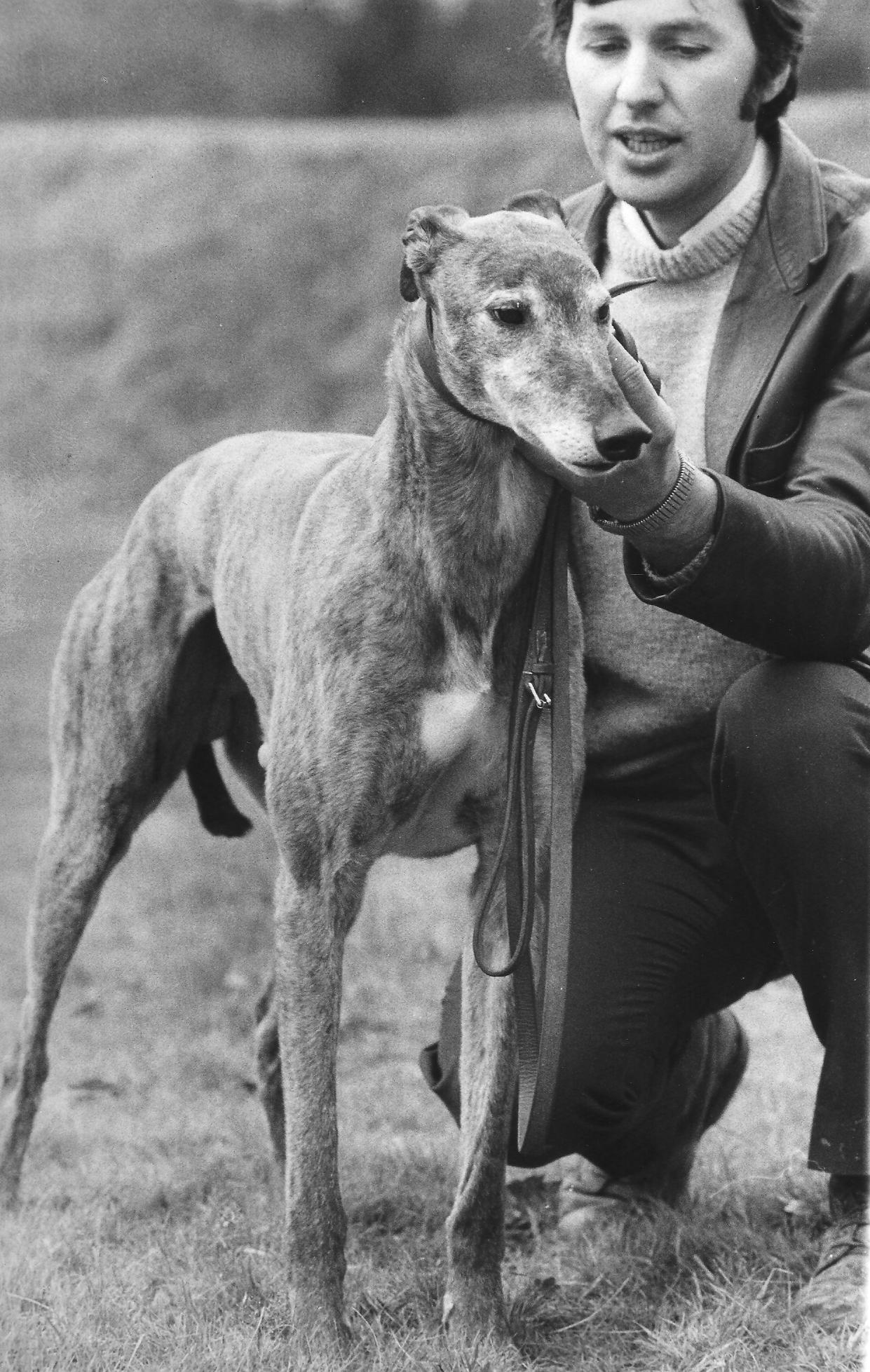
- Three times champion Sherrys Prince with trainer Colin West
- Class: Original classic - Category 1
- Location: Various
- Inaugurated: 1927
- Final run: 2024

Race information
- Surface: Sand
- Qualification: hurdlers only

The Grand National was an original classic greyhound racing competition held over the hurdles. It was run at White City Stadium from 1928 until 1984, it moved to Hall Green Stadium in 1985 and then on to Wimbledon Stadium in 1999.

In 2012, the Greyhound Racing Association allowed the race to leave their portfolio and it switched to Central Park Stadium in Sittingbourne. Central Park held the event until 2022 when it was cancelled in May before Ladbrokes stepped in to sponsor the event which was then held at Crayford Stadium from 2022 to 2023. Following the closure of Crayford Stadium the event came to an end.

Sherrys Prince holds the record of winning the event three times from 1970 to 1972, while trainer Ricky Holloway has trained six winners.

== Venues and distances ==
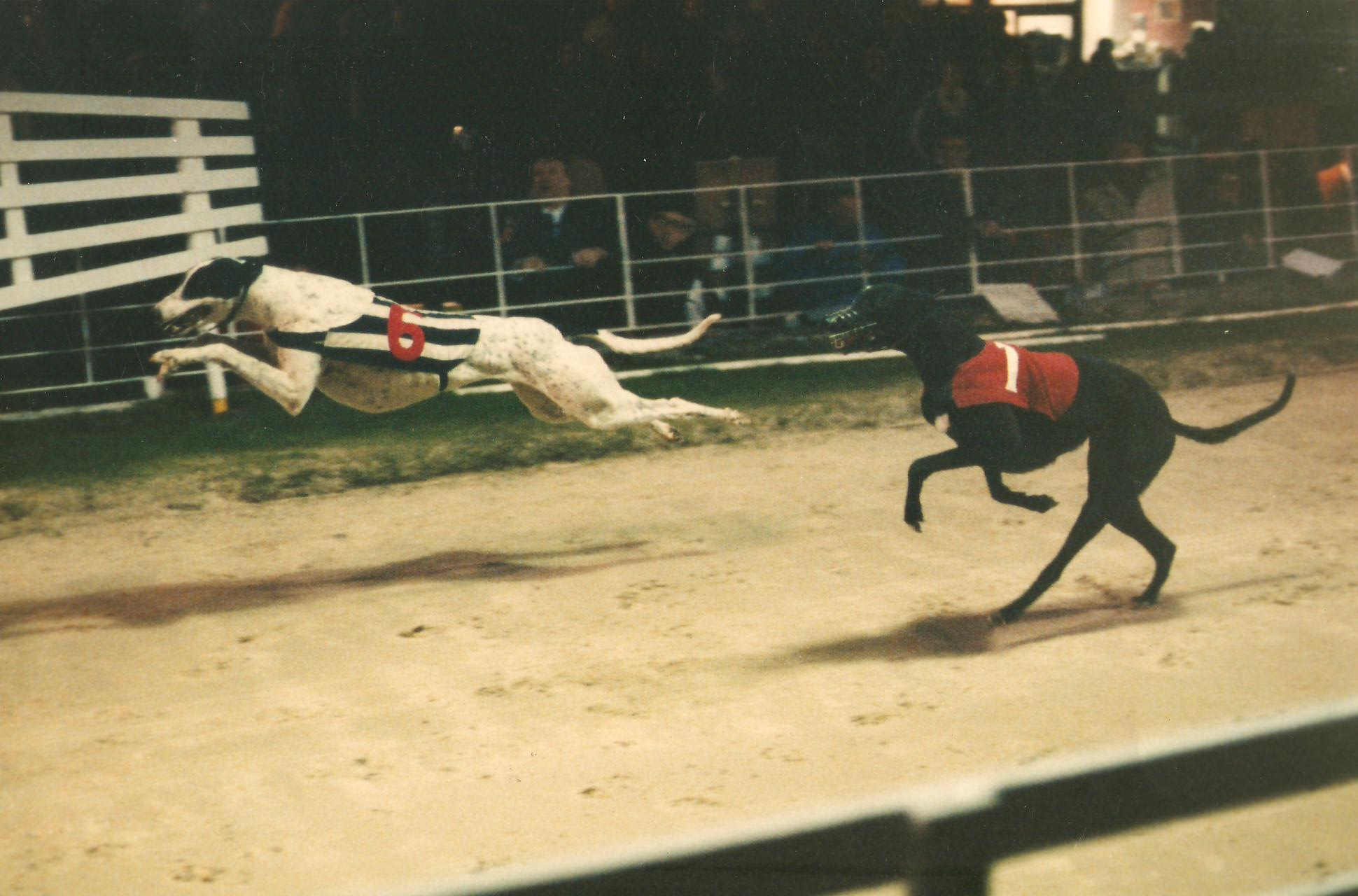
1990 Gizmo Pasha leads Deputy Tim in the semi-final

- 1927–1927 (White City, 500 y hurdles)
- 1928–1974 (White City, 525 y hurdles)
- 1975–1984 (White City, 500 m hurdles)
- 1985–1998 (Hall Green, 474 m hurdles)
- 1999–2009 (Wimbledon, 460 m hurdles)
- 2010–2011 (Wimbledon, 480 m hurdles)
- 2012–2022 (Sittingbourne/Central Park, 480 m hurdles)
- 2022–2022 (Crayford, 380 m hurdles)
- 2023–2024 (Crayford, 540 m hurdles)

== Sponsors ==
- 1988–1988 (Daily Mirror)
- 2006–2006, 2010 (William Hill)
- 2007–2007 (Betfair)
- 2008–2009 (Stan James)
- 2011–2011 (Primus Saver)
- 2012–2013, 2019 (Cearnsport)
- 2015–2015 (Chelsea Glass)
- 2016–2016 (MTS Cleansing Services)
- 2017–2018 (John Smith's Brewery)
- 2020–2020 (Colossus Bets)
- 2021–2021 (RPGTV)
- 2022–2022 (Arena Racing Company)
- 2023–2024 (Ladbrokes)

== Winners ==
| Year | Winner | Breeding | Trainer | Time (sec) | SP | Notes/ref |
|---|---|---|---|---|---|---|
| 1927 | Bonzo | Bon Marche - Bertha | Jack Buck (Belle Vue) | 31.42 | 13/8f | |
| 1928 | Cormorant | Stormont - Ballyveney Maid | Sidney Probert (Wembley) | 31.16 | 4/1 | |
| 1929 | Levator | Spalding Bishop - Lisgreen | Bob Burls (Wembley) | 31.09 | 2/1 | |
| 1930 | Stylish Cutlet | Mutton Cutlet - Style Kid | Jock Hutchinson (Wimbledon) | 30.94 | 11/4 | |
| 1931 | Rule The Roost | Jamie - Road Head Rally | Joe Harmon (White City) | 31.17 | 5/2 | |
| 1932 | Long Hop | Macoma - Bright Emblem | Ian McCorkindale (Harringay) | 31.44 | 3/1 | |
| 1933 | Scapegoat | Macoma - Bright Emblem | Albert Jonas (White City) | 31.20 | 6/1 | |
| 1934 | Lemonition | Golden Splendour - Green Gown | Dan Costello (Wimbledon) | 30.84 | 11/4 | |
| 1935 | Quarter Cross | Open Steak - For Ever | Sidney Probert (Wembley) | 30.76 | 7/2 | |
| 1936 | Kilganny Bridge | Red Cloud - Killemalla | Patrick Higgins (Clapton) | 30.70 | 3/1 | |
| 1937 | Flying Wedge | Beginner - Brannock Queen | Stan Biss (West Ham) | 30.61 | 1/1f | |
| 1938 | Juvenile Classic | Beef Cutlet - Lady Eleanor | Joe Harmon (Wimbledon) | 30.35 | 2/1 | |
| 1939 | Valiant Bob | Valiant Cutlet - Winged Maiden | Paddy Fortune (Wimbledon) | 30.50 | 8/1 | |
| 1940 | Juvenile Classic | Beef Cutlet - Lady Eleanor | Joe Harmon (Wimbledon) | 30.23 | 1/-1f | |
| 1946 | Barry From Limerick | Cherry Grove Cross - Connor May | E.Davidson (Private) | 30.61 | 2/1 | |
| 1947 | Baytown Pigeon | Manhattan Midnight - Little Nettle | Paddy McEllistrim (Wimbledon) | 30.67 | 25/1 | |
| 1948 | Joves Reason | Mooncoin Fiddler - Anxious Mate | Ken Appleton (West Ham) | 30.37 | 2/1 | |
| 1949 | Blossom of Annagura | Speedy Dancer - Orchard Blossom | Jack Sherry (Ramsgate) | 30.20 | 8/1 | |
| 1950 | Blossom of Annagura | Speedy Dancer - Orchard Blossom | Jack Sherry (Ramsgate) | 29.97 | 5/2 | |
| 1951 | XPDNC | Bellas Prince - Here Comes Eliza | Les Parry (White City) | 29.80 | 11/4jf | |
| 1952 | Whistling Laddie | Lone Seal - Whistling Rum | Stan Martin (Wimbledon) | 30.13 | 20/1 | |
| 1953 | Denver Berwick | Humming Bee - Baytown Fir | David Geggus (Walthamstow) | 30.26 | 10/11f | |
| 1954 | Prince Lawrence | Dangerous Prince - Knights Romance | Joe Pickering (New Cross) | 30.29 | 10/1 | |
| 1955 | Barrowside | Ballymac Ball - Nifty Bella | Jack Harvey (Wembley) | 29.43 | 1/3f | |
| 1956 | Blue Sand | Sandown Champion - Fast and Beautiful | Ken Appleton (West Ham) | 29.70 | 15/8f | |
| 1957 | Tanyard Tulip | Despot O'Leer - Knockeevan Tulip | Jack Harvey (Wembley) | 29.85 | 2/1 | |
| 1958 | Fodda Champion | Champion Prince - Wimble Lady | Jimmy Jowett (Clapton) | 30.20 | 7/4f | |
| 1959 | Prince Poppit | Champion Prince - Greenane Darkie | Dennis Hannafin (Wimbledon) | 30.10 | 3/1 | |
| 1960 | Bruff Chariot | Cheerful Chariot - Really Bold | Jimmy Jowett (Clapton) | 29.50 | 1/1f | |
| 1961 | Ballinatona Special | Superman - Orange Queen | Stan Martin (Wimbledon) | 29.50 | 6/4f | |
| 1962 | Corsican Reward | Solar Prince - Rose Confection | Gordon Hodson (Private) | 30.15 | 9/4f | |
| 1963 | Indoor Sport | Champion Prince - Yoblstrap | Barney O'Connor (Walthamstow) | 29.98 | 4/5f | |
| 1964 | Two Aces | Crazy Parachute - Penicola | Jimmy Rimmer (Wembley) | 30.42 | 10/11f | |
| 1965 | Im Crazy | Crazy Parachute - Misfortunate | Randy Singleton (White City) | 29.60 | 11/4 | |
| 1966 | Halfpenny King | Crazy Parachute - The Baw Wee | John Shevlin (New Cross) | 30.28 | 7/2 | |
| 1967 | The Grange Santa | The Grand Prince - Grange Delienne | Nora Gleeson (Wimbledon) | 29.72 | 9/4f | |
| 1968 | Ballintore Tiger | Prairie Flash - Not Landing | Norman Chambers (New Cross) | 29.50 | 1/3f | |
| 1969 | Tonys Friend | Prairie Flash - Maggie from Cork | Randy Singleton (White City) | 30.16 | 1/1f | |
| 1970 | Sherrys Prince | Mad Era - Nevasca | John Shevlin (West Ham) | 30.02 | 4/6f | |
| 1971 | Sherrys Prince | Mad Era - Nevasca | Colin West (West Ham) | 29.22 | 1/3f | |
| 1972 | Sherrys Prince | Mad Era - Nevasca | Colin West (West Ham) | 29.80 | 5/4f | |
| 1973 | Killone Flash | Forward Flash - Dancing Barrier | Randy Singleton (White City) | 29.35 | 5/2 | |
| 1974 | Shanneys Darkie | Monalee Champion - Shanney's Jet | Colin West (White City) | 29.43 | 10/1 | |
| 1975 | Pier Hero | Tender Hero - Helenas Girl | Frank Melville (Harringay) | 30.65 | 1/1f | |
| 1976 | Weston Pete | Monalee Champion - New Kashmir | Colin West (White City) | 30.60 | 4/5f | |
| 1977 | Salerno | Clerihan Venture - Fish Pond | John Coleman (Wembley) | 30.65 | 5/4f | |
| 1978 | Topothetide | Westpark Mint - Lady In Love | Tim Forster (Harringay) | 30.23 | 8/11f | |
| 1979 | Topothetide | Westpark Mint - Lady In Love | Tom Lanceman (Southend) | 31.60 | 6/4f | |
| 1980 | Gilt Edge Flyer | Monalee Expert - Proud Secretary | Eric Pateman (Private) | 30.22 | 4/5f | |
| 1981 | Bobcol | Westpark Mint - Black Katty | Norah McEllistrim (Wimbledon) | 30.64 | 1/2f | |
| 1982 | Face The Mutt | Mutts Silver - Mill Road Cast | Norah McEllistrim (Wimbledon) | 30.71 | 11/10f | |
| 1983 | Sir Winston | Myrtown - Kings Comet | George Curtis (Hove) | 31.09 | 5/1 | |
| 1984 | Kilcoe Foxy | Hume Highway - Aghadown Liz | George Curtis (Hove) | 30.32 | 4/5f | |
| 1985 | Seamans Star | Hume Highway - Sleepy Nell | Arthur Boyce (Catford) | 30.08 | 14/1 | |
| 1986 | Castlelyons Cash | Belvedere Bran - Kick On Susie | Dinky Luckhurst (Private) | 29.51 | 5/4f | |
| 1987 | Cavan Town | Sail On II - Leafy Glade | Mel Cumner (Maidstone) | 30.01 | 4/1 | |
| 1988 | Breeks Rocket | Noble Brigg - Sandville Lady | Dinky Luckhurst (Crayford) | 30.09 | 5/1 | |
| 1989 | Lemon Chip | Sinbad - Lemon Lisa | Philip Rees Jr. (Wimbledon) | 29.84 | 1/1f | |
| 1990 | Gizmo Pasha | Whisper Wishes - If And When | Linda Mullins (Romford) | 29.62 | 4/6f | |
| 1991 | Ideal Man | Clayderman - Ideal Honeygar | John McGee Sr. (Peterborough) | 29.81 | 3/1jf | dead-heat |
| 1991 | Ballycarney Dell | Track Man - Ballycarney Blue | Tony Gifkins (Yarmouth) | 29.81 | 14/1 | dead-heat |
| 1992 | Kildare Slippy | Track Man - Kildare Elm | Paddy Hancox (Hall Green) | 28.52 | 1/1f | Track record |
| 1993 | Arfur Daley | Pond Mirage - Blue Mint II | Bert Meadows (Private) | 28.89 | 5/4f | |
| 1994 | Randy Savage | Randy - Sooty Foot | Kevin Connor (Canterbury) | 29.50 | 8/1 | |
| 1995 | Elegant Brandy | Murlens Slippy - Elegant Dream | Ernie Gaskin Sr. (Walthamstow) | 29.24 | 10/1 | |
| 1996 | Dynamic Display | Aulton Slippy - Liquid Asset | Barry O'Sullivan (Crayford) | 29.23 | 7/2 | |
| 1997 | Tarn Bay Flash | Airmount Grand - Highmoor Mist | Pat McCombe (Belle Vue) | 29.07 | 4/1 | |
| 1998 | El Tenor | Ratify - Ballygar Rose | Linda Mullins (Walthamstow) | 29.20 | 11/10f | |
| 1999 | Hello Buttons | Trade Official - Pal Sal | Linda Mullins (Walthamstow) | 28.13 | 9/4jf | dead-heat |
| 1999 | Pottos Storm | Droopys Fintan - Certain Way | David Mullins (Romford) | 28.13 | 9/4jf | dead-heat |
| 2000 | Tuttles Minister | Alpine Minister - Tuttles Snowie | Tommy Foster (Wimbledon) | 28.36 | 3/1 | |
| 2001 | Kish Jaguar | Deenside Spark - Bansha Lough | Norah McEllistrim (Wimbledon) | 28.80 | 10/1 | |
| 2002 | Ballyvorda Class | No Road Back - Group Class | Tommy Foster (Wimbledon) | 28.24 | 7/4f | |
| 2003 | Selby Ben | Vintage Prince - Farloe Crib | Tommy Foster (Wimbledon) | 28.45 | 12/1 | |
| 2004 | Four Handed | Frisby Flashing – Tricamarie Cris | Jim Reynolds (Romford) | 28.46 | 6/4f | |
| 2005 | Lethal Rumble | Smooth Rumble – Lake Taz | Mark Wallis (Walthamstow) | 28.49 | 9/4f | |
| 2006 | Suit Man | Droopys Kewell – Genuine Ginger | Bernie Doyle (Wimbledon) | 28.30 | 13/8f | |
| 2007 | Jos Cigar | Larkhill Jo – Rich Cigar | Steve Willey (Sittingbourne) | 28.07 | 9/4 | |
| 2008 | Kildare Lark | Roanokee – Allen Joy | Jason Foster (Wimbledon) | 28.63 | 7/4f | |
| 2009 | Hotdog Jack | Droopys Vieri – Hare Star | Seamus Cahill (Wimbledon) | 28.49 | 2/1f | |
| 2010 | Plane Daddy | Big Daddy Cool – Lordsbury Knows | Gemma Davidson (Crayford) | 29.21 | 8/1 | |
| 2011 | Victoria Falls | Hades Rocket – Your View | Richard Rees (Wimbledon) | 29.80 | 25/1 | |
| 2012 | Baran Bally Hi | Tyrur Ted – Druids Judicial | Derek Knight (Hove) | 29.53 | 3/1 | |
| 2013 | Mash Mad Snowy | Droopys Maldini – Shades Of Snow | Seamus Cahill (Hove) | 29.31 | 5/2 | |
| 2014 | Cornamaddy Jumbo | Ardkill Jamie – Cornamaddy Maid | Mark Wallis (Yarmouth) | 29.48 | 1/1f | |
| 2015 | Mo's Bullet | Ace Hi Rumble – Precious Story | Ricky Holloway (Sittingbourne) | 29.80 | 7/1 | |
| 2016 | Ballymac Manix | Ballymac Vic – Moyar Kite | Seamus Cahill (Hove) | 29.32 | 9/4 | |
| 2017 | Razldazl Raidio | Razldazl Rioga - Razldazl Marilyn | Ricky Holloway (Central Park) | 29.61 | 2/7f | |
| 2018 | Parkers Dynamite | Kinloch Brae - Toms Delight | Mark Wallis (Towcester) | 29.46 | 7/4 | |
| 2019 | Caislean Fifi | Superior Product – Ballyegan Fifi | Seamus Cahill (Hove) | 29.30 | 10/11f | |
| 2020 | Roxholme Biscuit | Kinloch Brae – Roxholme Magic | Ricky Holloway (Central Park) | 29.50 | 5/4f | |
| 2021 | Meenagh Maverick | Droopys Roddick – Slippery Cinders | Ricky Holloway (Central Park) | 29.53 | 3/1 | |
| 2022 | Bobbing Gnavatar | Sh Avatar – Muchas Gracias | Barry O'Sullivan (Crayford) | 23.71 | 9/2 | new venue |
| 2023 | Coppice Fox | Droopys Sydney – Sizzling Daisy | Ricky Holloway (Central Park) | 34.59 | 11/2 | |
| 2024 | Signet Harper | Dorotas Wildcat – Not Too Late | Ricky Holloway (Crayford) | 23.56 | 1/2f | |
