= Gold Collar =

Former greyhound racing competition

- The first winner, Wild Woolley
- Class: Category 1
- Location: Catford (1933–2003); Belle Vue (2004-2009); Crayford (2015–2024); Brighton & Hove (2025–present)
- Inaugurated: 1933

Race information
- Surface: Sand

The Gold Collar is a Greyhound racing competition. It was inaugurated in 1933 at Catford Stadium.

Following the closure of Catford in 2003, the competition switched to Belle Vue Stadium, but it was discontinued in 2009. In 2015 the competition was resurrected by Crayford Stadium. After the closure of Crayford Stadium in 2024, the competition switched to Brighton & Hove in 2025.

== Venues and distances ==
- 1933–1933 (Catford, 400y)
- 1934–1935 (Catford, 540y)
- 1936–1962 (Catford, 440y)
- 1963–1971 (Catford, 570y)
- 1972–1974 (Catford, 610y)
- 1975–2003 (Catford, 555m)
- 2004–2004 (Belle Vue, 647m)
- 2005–2005 (Belle Vue, 465m)
- 2006–2009 (Belle Vue, 590m)
- 2015–2024 (Crayford, 540m)
- 2025–present (Hove, 500m)

== Sponsors ==
- 1994–1994 (John Humphreys Bookmakers)
- 1998–1998 (BT Global Finance)
- 2004–2009 (Totesport)
- 2015–2023 (Ladbrokes)
- 2024–2024 (Jay & Kay Coach Tours)
- 2025–2025 (Coral)

== Winners ==
Year	Winner	Breeding	Trainer	Time (sec)	SP	Notes/ref
1933	Wild Woolley	Hautley-Wild Witch	Jack Rimmer (White City - Manchester)	26.63	1/3f	
1934	Davesland	Kick Him Down-Hasty Go	Jack Harvey (Harringay)	32.70	7/1	
1935	Bosham	Hertford-White Cap	Leslie Reynolds (White City - London)	32.84	5/1	
1936	Fine Jubilee	Silver Seal-Harissi	Marjorie Yate (Private)	26.00	4/5f	
1937	Avion Ballerina	Future Cutlet-Avion Beauty	Jerry Hannafin (Wimbledon)	25.87	6/1	
1938	Junior Classic	Beef Cutlet-Lady Eleanor	Joe Harmon (Wimbledon)	25.77	11/8f	
1939	Grosvenor Ferdinand	Golden Hammer-Wonderful Expression	F S Rolfe (Private)	25.92	13/2	
1940	Cash Balance	Battle Fare-Lottery Lark	Sidney Probert (Wembley)	25.74	100/7	
1945	Ballyhennessy Seal	Lone Seal-Canadian Glory	Stan Martin (Wimbledon)	25.45	9/4	
1946	King Silver	Tanist-Tasty Leader	Cornelius Crowley (Clapton)	25.88	9/4	
1947	Trev's Perfection	Trev's Despatch-Friar Tuck	Fred Trevillion (Private)	25.52	7/1	
1948	Local Interprize	Ruby Border-Mythical Daisy	Stan Biss (Clapton)	25.71	8/13f	
1949	Local Interprize	Ruby Border-Mythical Daisy	Stan Biss (Clapton)	25.88	6/4f	
1950	Islandeady	Manhattan Seale-Inishraher	H G Copsey (Private)	26.07	8/1	
1951	Loyal Accomplice	Mad Tanist-Belle O'Harlem	Tom Paddy Reilly (Walthamstow)	25.63	4/5f	
1952	Hectic Birthday	Mad Birthday-Biting Antoinette	Ronnie Melville (Wembley)	25.41	10/1	=Track record
1953	Mushera Silver	Dark Shadow-Little Bluebell	L Gould (Private)	25.70	13/2	
1954	Ardskeagh Ville	Dante The Great-My Dreamland	Dave Barker (Catford)	25.86	9/4	
1955	Firgrove Slipper	Ballymac Ball-Hannahs Beauty	Jim Syder Jr. (Wembley)	26.35	7/2	
1956	Ponsford	Quare Customer-Poobahs Pet	Noreen Collin (Private)	25.69	10/1	
1957	Silent Worship	The Grand Champion-Miss Chancer	John Bassett (Private)	25.50	4/11f	
1958	Five Up	Nine Up-Duplicate	Ron Chamberlain (Private)	25.43	6/4f	
1959	Dunstown Warrior	Demon King-Geffs Linnett	Tom Paddy Reilly (Walthamstow)	25.77	11/4	
1960	Catch Cold	Keep Moving-Swift Echo	Dennis Hannafin (Wimbledon)	25.56	8/1	
1961	Long Story	Flash Jack-I'm Yours	Phil Rees Sr. (Private)	25.69	20/1	
1962	Super Orange	Super Man-Orange Queen	Pam Heasman (Private)	25.51	4/1	
1963	Music Guest	Solar Prince-The Grand Duchess	Tommy Johnston Jr. (West Ham)	33.36	5/2	
1964	Mighty Wind	Irish Quarter-Mighty Ash	George Waterman (Wimbledon)	33.36	33/1	
1965	Friday Morning	Dandy Man-Dramatic Tune	Ron Chamberlain (Private)	33.73	11/10f	
1966	Dark Symphony	Prairie Flash-Small Loss	Peter Collett (Private)	33.21	100/8	
1967	Stylish Lad	Greenane Wonder-Stylish Biddy	Jack Smith (Catford)	33.75	5/2	
1968	Shanes Rocket	Crazy Parachute-Shanes Judy	Paddy Milligan (Private)	33.39	7/2	
1969	Surprising Fella	The Grand Canal-Julies Surprise	Jack Smith (Catford)	33.40	2/1F	
1970	Cameo Lawrence	Dusty Trail-Hack Up Titanic	Jack Smith (Catford)	33.84	8/1	
1971	Down Your Way	Printer Prince-Wonder Groves	Freddie Warrell (Private)	33.10	5/2	
1972	Rathmartin	Kilbeg Kuda-Tyone Lark	Clare Orton (Wimbledon)	35.36	7/4	
1973	Ramdeen Stuart	Sallys Story-Any Streak	Norman Oliver (Brough Park)	35.04	1/3f	
1974	Leaders Champion	Monalee Champion-Little Leader	David Geggus (Walthamstow)	35.02	8/11f	
1975	Abbey Glade	Kilbelin Style-Abbey Groves	George Curtis (Brighton)	34.97	11/4	
1976	Westmead Champ	Westmead County-Hacksaw	Pam Heasman (Hackney)	35.02	4/7f	
1977	Westmead Power	Westmead County-Westmead Damson	Natalie Savva (Bletchley)	34.98	11/4	
1978	Im A Smasher	Rockfield Era-Kiltean Fawn	John Coleman (Wembley)	35.31	7/1	
1979	Gayflash	Fionntra Frolic-London Child	Paddy Milligan (Catford)	35.08	7/2	
1980	Sport Promoter	Breakaway Town-Kensington Queen	Pat Mullins (Cambridge)	35.06	8/15f	
1981	Laughing Sam	Tullig Rambler-Sherrys Corner	Mrs Pat Goode (Hall Green)	35.50	4/1	
1982	Donnas Dixie	Black Beetle-Bright Parade	Henry Kibble (Bristol)	35.19	13/8	
1983	Rathduff Tad	Ceili Band-Rathduff Gazelle	Tony Dennis (Southend)	35.13	7/1	
1984	Wheelers Tory	Glen Rock-Sandhill Fawn	Paul Wheeler (Private)	35.05	11/-4	
1985	Black Whirl	Sand Man-Prince of Rocks	Tom Gates (Private)	34.99	5/1	
1986	Westmead Move	Whisper Wishes-Westmead Tania	Nick Savva (Private)	34.80	11/4	
1987	Half Awake	Sand Man-Fenians Minnie	Barry Silkman (Private)	34.90	4/1	
1988	Sard	Manorville Sand-Knockroe Elm	John McGee Sr. (Canterbury)	34.61	6/4	
1989	Burgess Ruby	Im Slippy-Burgess Emerald	Arthur Boyce (Hackney)	34.72	7/2	
1990	Dempseys Whisper	Whisper Wishes-Lemon Gem	Patsy Byrne (Canterbury)	34.84	9/4f	
1991	Appleby Lisa	Whisper Wishes-Moon Bran	Harry Dodds (Norton Canes)	34.67	5/1	
1992	Westmead Suprise	Daleys Gold-Westmead Move	Nick Savva (Milton Keynes)	34.75	6/4	
1993	Ardcollum Hilda	Druids Johno-Seventh Dynamic	Patsy Byrne (Wimbledon)	34.84	5/4f	
1994	Pearls Girl	Flashy Sir-Desert Pearl	Sam Sykes (Wimbledon)	34.82	7/4jf	
1995	Alans Rose	Ardfert Mick-Alans Soda	John Coleman (Walthamstow)	34.61	11/10f	
1996	Homeside Knight	Slaneyside Denny-Hometown Girl	Tom Gates (Catford)	34.80	7/1	
1997	Lenson Billy	Slaneyside Hare-Ballydaly Flyer	Norah McEllistrim (Wimbledon)	35.02	1/2f	
1998	Pure Patches	Arrigle Buddy-Pure Princess	Dinky Luckhurst (Crayford)	34.68	11/10f	
1999	Rio Scorpio	Frightful Flash-Gallows Quest	Daniel Riordan (Harlow)	34.83	12/1	
2000	Castlelyons Dani	Spiral Nikita-Foxclose Daisy	Arthur Hitch (Wimbledon)	35.04	5/4f	
2001	Haughty Ted	Doyou Getit-Haughty Lady	Dinky Luckhurst (Crayford)	35.26	2/1	
2002	Shevchenko	Toms The Best-All Up Front	Seamus Cahill (Wimbledon)	35.13	4/5f	
2003	Toms Little Jo	Toms The Best-Westmead Josie	Gary Baggs (Walthamstow)	34.56	3/1	
2004	Roxholme Girl	Pacific Mile-Gilded Choice	Hayley Keightley (Private)	39.01	4/6f	Track record
2005	Bat On	Judicial Pride-Rio Sombrero	Charlie Lister OBE (Private)	27.34	4/7f	Track record
2006	Roxholme Girl	Pacific Mile-Gilded Choice	Carly Philpott (Coventry)	35.14	8-15f	
2007	Vatican Jinky	Hondo Black-Ladys Best Lass	Pat Rosney (Monmore)	35.06	9/-2	Track record
2008	Barnfield Loreto	Droopys Maldini – Droopys Beauty	Pat Rosney (Monmore)	35.21	5/2	
2009	Southwind Harry	Droopys Shearer – Mogeely Marina	Kim Billingham (Monmore)	35.21	6/1	
2015	Corrin Bob	Mountleader Matt – Corrin Queen	Ernest Gaskin Jr. (Romford)	33.67	5/1	
2016	Yahoo Victor	Mall Brandy – Yahoo Carmel	Barry O'Sullivan (Crayford)	33.54	9/2	
2017	Mayshighlandreel	Kinloch Brae - Mays Maska	Martyn Wiley (Romford)	33.09	5/2jf	= Track record
2018	Droopys Dresden	Mall Brandy - Droopys Star	Phil Simmonds (Romford)	33.93	9/4	
2019	Saving Sonic	Kinloch Brae – Newinn This Way	John Mullins (Yarmouth)	33.95	7/2	
2020	Desperado Dan	Iso Octane – Slaneyside Mandy	Patrick Janssens (Central Park)	33.64	1/2f	
2021	Warzone Tom	Good News – Bogger Bonnie	Liz McNair (Private)	33.58	4/6f	
2022	Savana Ruinart	Kinloch Brae – Redzer Ruby	Diane Henry (Towcester)	33.24	1/1f	
2023	Laughil Jess	Out Of Range ASB – Laughil Irene	David Lee (Crayford)	33.46	2/1	
2024	Aayamza Sydney	Droopys Sydney – Aayamza Breeze	John Mullins (Towcester)	32.85	7/4f	Track record
2025	Noellie	Ballyhimikin Jet – Droopys Gifted	Paul Young (Romford)	29.00	14/1	
