= Seamus Cahill =

British and Irish greyhound racing trainer

Personal information
- Born: 1948-1950 Mullinahone
- Occupation: Greyhound Trainer

Sport
- Sport: Greyhound racing

Achievements and titles
- National finals: Derby wins: English Derby (2017); Classic/Feature wins: St Leger (2023, 2024); Cesarewitch (2010); Gold Collar (2002); Grand National (2009, 2013, 2016, 2019); William Hill Classic (2012); Trainers Championship (2008); Sussex Cup (2013, 2018, 2019); British Bred Produce Stakes (2021); The Puppy Derby (2010, 2020, 2021); East Anglian Derby (2023); Arc (2006, 2016); Hunt Cup (2025)

Seamus Augustine Cahill is an Irish born greyhound trainer. He was a 2010 UK trainer of the year and winner of the 2017 English Greyhound Derby.

== Career ==
Seamus Cahill is from Mullinhoe, County Waterford and joined Catford Stadium in 1994 working for Paddy Milligan. In 1997 he took control of Milligan's Catford Stadium racing kennels in Keston and established himself as a leading trainer. He reached the final of the Laurels in his maiden year of 1997. One year later he moved from Catford to Wimbledon Stadium.

In 2002 finished runner-up in the 2002 English Greyhound Derby final with Call Me Baby and Shevchenko provided the first Classic win when sealing a Gold Collar triumph in the same year.

A move to Walthamstow Stadium was followed by a switch to Brighton & Hove Greyhound Stadium before he won his first Trainers Championship at Wimbledon in 2008 and became Greyhound Trainer of the Year in 2010. He trained the sprinter and 2010 Greyhound of the Year Jimmy Lollie and won four Grand Nationals.

His greatest achievement to date is winning the 2017 English Greyhound Derby with Astute Missile. In 2023, he won the St Leger for the first time with Droopys Clue, who broke the track record in the final, and the East Anglian Derby, also for the first time. Droopys Clue successfully defended the St Leger title in 2024 for Cahill.

== Awards ==
He was the winner of the Greyhound Trainer of the Year in 2010.
