= Coronation Stakes (greyhounds) =

Greyhound race in England

- Location: Wembley Stadium
- Inaugurated: 1928
- Final run: 1994

Race information
- Distance: 490 metres
- Surface: Sand

The Coronation Stakes was a greyhound racing competition held annually at Wembley Stadium. It was inaugurated in 1928, one of the earliest competitions in greyhound racing. The race was one of the premier bitches only event in the UK greyhound calendar.

The competition came to an end following the closure of the Wembley Greyhounds by the Greyhound Racing Association and the sale of the stadium by their parent company Wembley plc.

== Past winners ==
| Year | Winner | Breeding | Trainer | Time | SP | Notes |
|---|---|---|---|---|---|---|
| 1928 | Beaded Biddy | Beaded Dick – One Drop | Jack Chadwick (White City, London) | 30.23 | 1-1f | |
| 1929 | Silent Lassie | Gips Pride – Staying Blood | A Smith (White City, London) | 30.91 | 5-4f | |
| 1930 | Toftwood Misery | Hopeful - Harborina | Sidney Orton (Wimbledon) | 30.45 | | |
| 1931 | Bradshaw Fold | Newville Captain – December Girl | Stanley Biss (West Ham) | 30.50 | | |
| 1932 | Roving Joan | Dick The Rover – Blackwater Light | Arthur 'Doc' Callanan (Wembley) | 30.65 | | |
| 1933 | Queen Of The Suir | Mutton Cutlet - Burette | Stanley Biss (West Ham) | 30.06 | | |
| 1934 | Queen Of The Suir | Mutton Cutlet - Burette | Stanley Biss (West Ham) | 30.03 | | |
| 1935 | Gilly Flower | | Jim Syder Sr. (Wembley) | 30.33 | | |
| 1936 | Ripe Cherry | Tallboy - Grille | Leslie Reynolds (White City, London) | 30.33 | 6-4 | |
| 1937 | Beckbury Moth | | Marjorie Yate (Private) | 30.31 | | |
| 1938 | Quarter Day | Lawyers Fee - House Keeper | Joe Harmon (Wimbledon) | 30.03 | 3-1 | |
| 1939 | Quarter Day | Lawyers Fee - House Keeper | Joe Harmon (Wimbledon) | 29.34 | 2-5f | |
| 1941 | Duna Taxilas | | Eddie Wright (Harringay) | 29.57 | 6-4f | |
| 1942 | Satin Beauty | | Miss D Durant (Charlton) | 29.46 | 4-6f | |
| 1943 | Disputed Rattler | Dasher Lad – Cheer The Rattler | Sidney Orton (Wimbledon) | 29.80 | 4-11f | |
| 1944 | Erin's Fury | Wireless Rally – Erin Green | Johnny Bullock (West Ham) | 29.63 | 8-15f | |
| 1945 | Prancing Kitty | Tanist - Be Careful Kitty | Paddy Fortune (Wimbledon) | 29.36 | 2-5f | |
| 1946 | Trev's Castle | Castledown Lad – Maries Treasure | Fred Trevillion (Private) | 29.65 | 8-11f | |
| 1947 | Crissie Tanist | Tanist – Milanies Yank | Johnny Bullock (West Ham) | 29.39 | 4-1 | |
| 1948 | Major Movement | Fair Major – Erin Green | Stanley Biss (Clapton) | 29.48 | 5-1 | |
| 1949 | Baytown Stream | Baytown Cuckoo – Baytown Crow | Stanley Biss (Clapton) | 29.45 | 9-4f | |
| 1950 | Linden Grove | | Jack Harvey (Wembley) | 29.62 | 5-2 | |
| 1951 | Santa Barbara II | Train – Belle O'Manhattan | Reg 'String' Marsh (Walthamstow) | 29.60 | 5-2 | |
| 1952 | Bohemian Lady | | Leslie Reynolds (Wembley) | 29.83 | 6-1 | |
| 1953 | Town Belle | | Ron Chamberlain (Private) | 29.72 | 9-4f | |
| 1954 | Judy Luck | Trevs Cutter – Queens Wood | Reg 'String' Marsh (Walthamstow) | 29.67 | 8-11f | |
| 1955 | Fuzzie Bernie | Ballymac Ball – Parkmore Music | Stan Martin (Wimbledon) | 29.48 | 7-4f | |
| 1956 | Silver Strand | Hurry Abdul – Moody Dreamer | Dennis Hannafin (Wimbledon) | 29.71 | 100-30 | |
| 1957 | Ashgrove Pleasure | Ryton Basher - Baytown Surplus | Stan Martin (Wimbledon) | 29.79 | 100-30 | |
| 1958 | Silver Strand | Hurry Abdul – Moody Dreamer | Dennis Hannafin (Wimbledon) | 29.54 | 7-4f | |
| 1959 | Princess Jester | Champion Prince – Kittys Jester | Jack Harvey (Wembley) | 29.51 | 1-6f | |
| 1960 | Mink Muff | The Grand Champion – Miss Mink | Joe De Mulder (Private) | 29.65 | 13-8f | |
| 1961 | Just Sherry | Knockhill Chieftain – Nimble Star | Phil Rees Sr. (Wimbledon) | 29.37 | | |
| 1962 | Dainty Spark | Hi There – Wild Princess | W Taylor (White City, London) | 29.38 | | |
| 1963 | Lucky Joan II | Recorded Course-Astraea | John Bassett (Clapton) | 29.57 | | |
| 1964 | Precious Pam | Mile Bush Pride – Precious Princess | George Waterman (Wimbledon) | 29.71 | 8-1 | |
| 1965 | Drumsough Princess | Hi There – Gettysburg Princess | Bob Burls (Wembley) | 29.59 | | |
| 1966 | Roman Vale | Crazy Parachute – Fairy Julia | | 29.86 | | |
| 1967 | Trudy's Bird | Lucky Wonder – The Bird II | John Perrin (Private) | 29.49 | | |
| 1968 | Bredas Feathers | Oregon Prince – Reviewfield Queen | K.Webb (Private) | 29.17 | | |
| 1969 | Cals Pick | Any Harm – Flying Cherry | Jack Harvey (Wembley) | 29.57 | 3-1 | |
| 1970 | Mannon Ranger | Clonmannon Flash – Charlies Pension | Tommy Johnston Jr. (Wembley) | 30.16 | | |
| 1971 | Drive On | Sallys Story – Briquette Fire | Tommy Johnston Jr. (Wembley) | 29.17 | | |
| 1972 | Tarralina | Always Proud – Parlando | Tommy Johnston Jr. (Wembley) | 29.88 | 20-1 | |
| 1973 | Flonic Amy Joe | Monalee Champion – Nelson Farewell | Wally Ginzel (Wembley) | 29.55 | 6-1 | |
| 1974 | Shara Flash | Silver Hope – Flashy Minnie | Noreen Collin (Private) | 29.69 | | |
| 1975 | Irwin Lawn | Irish Rain – High Voltage | Pat Mullins (Ipswich) | 30.08 | | |
| 1976 | Paradise Peg | Commutering - Rit Peg Princess | Ted Griffin (Private) | 29.44 | 1-1f | |
| 1977 | Elteen Queen | Crefogue Flash – Bozos Pride | Philip Rees Jr. (Wimbledon) | 29.92 | 4-1 | |
| 1978 | Westmead Trophy | Fionntra Frolic – Westmead Damson | Wally Ginzel (Wembley) | 30.16 | | |
| 1979 | Gayflash | Fionntra Frolic-London Child | Paddy Milligan (Catford) | 29.82 | | |
| 1980 | Kildangan Wind | Ritas Choice – Kildangan Ana | | 29.96 | | |
| 1981 | Balaclava Charge | Ritas Choice – Hara Kara | | 29.69 | | |
| 1983 | Lannon Lass | Gaily Noble – City Charmer | Tony Mann (Swindon) | 29.65 | | |
| 1984 | Sandy Sally | Sand Man - Ballyderg Moth | Jack Coker (Milton Keynes) | 30.08 | | |
| 1985 | Beautiful Blue | Brabe Bran – Inchon Queen | | 29.59 | | |
| 1986 | Urban Duchess | Oran Jack – So Quick | Carol Aymes (Swindon) | 29.83 | | |
| 1987 | Round Grove | Carrick Chance – Knockash Flame | | 30.46 | | |
| 1988 | Kilbeg Judy | Cronins Bar – Thoor Ballylee | Kenny Linzell (Walthamstow) | 29.34 | | |
| 1989 | Barnacuiga Lass | Dads Bank - Lady Rossmore | Geoff De Mulder (Norton Canes) | 29.50 | | |
| 1990 | Mountain Madam | Jims Memory - Seafarer | D Warwick (Reading) | 30.38 | 7-4f | |
| 1991 | Sunspec Jess | On Spec – Nelsons Sunrise | Harry Crapper (Sheffield) | 29.62 | 7-2 | |
| 1992 | Certain Way | Satharn Beo – Free Fancy | Geoff De Mulder (Perry Barr) | 28.76 | 1-5f | Track record |
| 1993 | Dens Duchess | Greenpark Fox – Rosewood Lass | Colin Barwick (Portsmouth) | 29.31 | 5-1 | |
| 1994 | Weave Macgregor | Manorville Magic – Cute Pigeon | Patsy Byrne (Hackney) | 53.56 | 1-1f | |

== Venues & Distances ==
- 1928–1974 (Wembley 500 yards)
- 1975–1994 (Wembley 490 metres)
