= Champion Stakes (English greyhound race) =

British greyhound racing competition

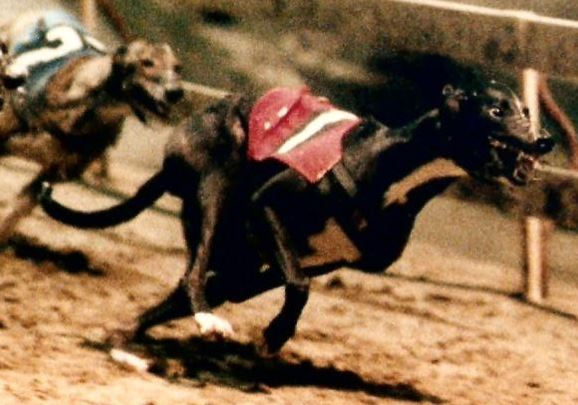
- Westmead Suprise, 1993 winner
- Class: Category 1
- Location: Romford
- Inaugurated: 1929
- Sponsor: Premier Greyhound Racing

Race information
- Distance: 575 metres
- Surface: Sand
- Purse: £20,000 (winner)

The Champion Stakes is a greyhound racing competition held annually at Romford Greyhound Stadium in East London, England.

== History ==
It was inaugurated at Wimbledon Stadium in 1929. However, in 1973 the event was discontinued until Romford resurrected it as an open event in 1988. In 2022, the first prize increased to £20,000 following sponsorship from Premier Greyhound Racing (the collaboration between the Arena Racing Company and Entain.

== Venues and distances ==
- 1929–1931 (Wimbledon 550y)
- 1932–1973 (Wimbledon 500y)
- 1988–present (Romford 575m)

== Sponsors ==
- 1997 (Tony Morris – Track bookmaker)
- 2005–2005 (Coral)
- 2006–2007 (Stadium Bookmakers)
- 2008–2021 (Coral)
- 2021–present (Premier Greyhound Racing)

== Winners ==
Year	Winner	Breeding	Trainer	Time	SP	Notes/Ref
1929	Buckna Boy	Happy Hal – Lady Lee	W. L. Renwick	32.99	2/1	
1930	Doumergue	Dago – Beaded Jean	H. Farrand (Private)		1/2f	
1931	Toftwood Mystic	Hopeful – Harborina	Sidney Orton (Wimbledon)		2/1	
1932	Goopy Gear	Rattleaway – Feale Wave	Arthur Doc Callanan (Wembley)	28.89	1/2f	
1933	Creamery Border	Border Line – Cook	Arthur Doc Callanan (Wembley)	28.93	4/6f	
1934	Curley's Fancy II	Mutton Cutlet – Delenette	Joe Harmon (Wimbledon)		13/8f	
1935	Curley's Fancy II	Mutton Cutlet – Delenette	Joe Harmon (Wimbledon)	28.81	5/2	
1936	Diamond Glory	Kilnagory – Ten Diamonds	Ronnie Melville (Private)		6/1	
1937	Wily Captain	Lawyers Fee – Whirlwave	Joe Harmon (Wimbledon)		100/8	
1938	Roeside Scottie	Creamery Border – Deemsters Olive	Arthur Doc Callanan (Wembley)	28.63	25/1	
1939	Junior Classic	Beef Cutlet – Lady Eleanor	Joe Harmon (Wimbledon)	28.72	11/10f	
1940	Jungle Conquest	–	Miss B Lark (Walthamstow)	29.25	5/1	
1941	Lights O' London	Creamery Border – Life of Luxury	Joe Harmon (Wimbledon)		2/5f	
1942	Tread Warily	–			1/1f	
1943		–				
1944	Rothmans's Arthur	Roving Spring – Eve's Buttonhole			8/13f	
1945	Gala Flash	Tokio – Joyouse Ruth	Charles Lee (Bradford)	28.23	5/4f	
1946	Alvaston Apollo	Junior Classic – Heather Belle	(Wimbledon)			
1947	Brighter Days		Stan Raymond (Gloucester)	29.25	4/9f	
1948	Ala Mein II	Mad Tanist – Fair Madge	(Wembley)			
1949	Good Worker	Tanimon – Dolly Meadway	Jack Daley (Ramsgate)	28.38	8/11f	
1950	Magna Hasty	Model Dasher – Mary Hasty	Stan Martin (Wimbledon)	28.79	10/11f	
1951	Theydons Son	Bahs Choice – Richmond Dancer	J Walsh (Walthamstow)	28.72	8/11f	
1952	Denver Berwick	Humming Bee – Baytown Fir	Dave Geggus (Walthamstow)	28.67	9/4	
1953	Endless Gossip	Priceless Border – Narrogar Ann	Leslie Reynolds (Wembley)	28.09	1/6f	
1954	Cree Dusk	Heavy Swell – Gala Beauty	Sidney Orton (Wimbledon)	28.67	6/1	
1955	Alta Derrynane	Mad Tanist – Priceless Prize	W Fletcher (Bradford)	28.44	2/9f	
1956	Gulf Of Darien	Imperial Dancer – Dorothy Ann	Jack Harvey (Wembley)	28.27	10/11f	
1957	Highway Tim	Magourna Reject – Hunston Bell	Mrs Rosealie Beba (Private)	28.06	1/2f	
1958	Town Prince	Small Town – Orphan Princess	Leslie Reynolds (Wembley)	28.18		
1959	Dunmore Rocco	Hi There – Dunmore Claudia	Dennis Hannafin (Wimbledon)	28.41	8/11f	
1960	Varra Black Nose	Glittering Look – Typhoon Jane	Dennis Hannafin (Wimbledon)	28.30	3/1	
1961	Avis	Polonius – Twenty Smackers	Jimmy Rimmer (Clapton)	40.05		
1962	Old Berry Silver	Ardskeagh Ville – Skylark	Fred Berrow (Private)	40.11		
1963	Long Fawn	The Grand Fire – Moyne Rosette	Ted Brennan (Owlerton)	40.64		
1964	Tinas Beauty	Varra Black Nose – Janetina	Bill Matthews (Southend)	40.98	7/4f	
1965	Julies Surprise	Low Pressure – Rapid Progress	Jack Smith (Catford)	40.71		
1966	Precious Nance	Mile Bush Pride – Precious Princess	Nora Gleeson (Wimbledon)	40.39		
1967	Welcome Work	Welcome Home – Nifty Lady	Nora Gleeson (Wimbledon)	40.56		
1968	TricTrac	Crazy Parachute – Supreme Witch	Jim Hookway (Owlerton)	39.66		
1969	Hiver Tatty	Crazy Society – Hiver Swanky	Jim Morgan (Private)	40.08	3/1	
1970	Little Tiddler	Faithful Hope – Printing Rosedale	Clare Orton (Wimbledon)	40.17	4/9f	
1972	Sandy Desert	Ambiguous – Tinkers Pencil	Paddy McEvoy (Wimbledon)	40.31	1/2f	
1973	Forest Noble	Prince of Roses – Forest Brown	Paddy McEvoy (Wimbledon)			
1974 to 1987 not held
1988	Dads Flier	Dads Bank – Mams Bank	John Sherry (Walthamstow)	35.79	5/1	
1989	Sard	Manorville Sand – Knockroe Elm	John McGee Sr. (Canterbury)	35.47	10/11f	
1990	Sail Over	Ballygarvan What – Touch The Sail	Sam Sykes (Wimbledon)	36.06	7/2	
1991	Sail Over	Ballygarvan What – Touch The Sail	Sam Sykes (Wimbledon)	35.28	10/1	
1992	Chic Mona	Gastrognome – Sirius Mona	Ernie Gaskin Sr. (Walthamstow)	35.58	11/4	
1993	Westmead Suprise	Daleys Gold – Westmead Move	Nick Savva (Private)	36.05	3/1	
1994	Heres Seanie	Ardfert Sean – Mindys Miracle	Pat Ryan (Perry Barr)	35.22	6/4f	
1995	Westmead Merlin	Murlens Slippy – Westmead Hannah	Nick Savva (Walthamstow)	35.20	4/9f	
1996	Lady Ellie	Hypnotic Stag – Satharn Lady	John Coleman (Walthamstow)	35.19	3/1	
1997	Elderberry Chick	Adraville Bridge – Mindys Miracle	Pat Ryan (Private)	34.86	2/5f	Track record
1998	Pottos Storm	Droopys Fintan – Certain Way	David Mullins (Romford)	35.12	11/1	
1999	Touchwood Gent	Tip Top – Brave Heart	John Quinn (Romford)	35.81	6/1	
2000	Palace Issue	Deerpark Jim – Clear Issue	Linda Mullins (Walthamstow)	35.44	5/4f	
2001	El Othello	Top Honcho – Oakfront Star	John McGee Sr. (Private)	35.51	7/1	
2002	Cooly Cougar	Top Honcho – Droopys Kylie	Brian Clemenson (Hove)	35.22	3/1	
2003	Clover Top	Top Honcho – Dons Pride	Brian Clemenson (Hove)	35.34	11/8f	
2004	Centour Para	Judicial Pride – Clover Cailin	Brian Clemenson (Hove)	35.69	5/1	
2005	Denmarknick	Droopys Vieri – Dower Beauty	Peter Rich (Romford)	35.93	9/4jf	
2006	Son of Phoebe	Droopys Vieri – Killeacle Phoebe	Brian Clemenson (Hove)	35.49	6/4f	
2007	Eye onthe Veto	Kiowa Sweet Trey – Pennys Cloud	Mark Wallis (Walthamstow)	35.54	4/5f	
2008	Lenson Joker	Kiowa Sweet Trey – Free To Air	Tony Collett (Sittingbourne)	35.22	4/11f	
2009	Go Big Hitter	Big Daddy Cool – Droopys Kara	Dean Childs (Private)	35.64	5/4f	
2010	Raving Black	Westmead Hawk – Droopys Britney	Seamus Cahill (Hove)	35.10	7/2	
2011	Droopys Hester	Droopys Vieri – Droopys Maddy	Jimmy Wright (Newcastle)	35.59	11/8f	
2012	Smiler Jack	Hondo Black – Precious Beauty	Chris Mosdall (Wimbledon)	35.28	6/4f	
2013	Airport Captain	Big Daddy Cool – Airport Boss	Kevin Hutton (Swindon)	34.67	7/2	Track record
2014	Millwards Master	Hondo Black – Spioraid Cath	Paul Young (Romford)	35.02	14/1	
2015	Patchys Kerry	Blackstone Gene – Droopys Stosur	Mark Wallis (Towcester)	35.58	7/1	
2016	Ascot Woodie	Droopys Scolari – Ascot Megan	John Mullins (Yarmouth)	35.40	8/1	
2017	Murrys Act	Tullymurry Act – Brave Meave	Kevin Boon (Yarmouth)	35.15	5/2jf	
2018	Bombers Bullet	Droopys Cain – Headford Hoe	Mark Wallis (Henlow)	34.97	5/2f	
2019	Aayamza Express	Skywalker Puma – Kilcotton Kate	Mark Wallis (Henlow)	34.90	6/4f	
2020	Desperado Dan	Iso Octane – Slaneyside Mandy	Patrick Janssens (Central Park)	34.93	10/3	(Note: Smallmead stripped of title following a positive drugs test.)
2021	Night Time Danny	Sh Avatar – Nom De Plume	Steve Rayner (Henlow)	34.94	3/1	
2022	Warzone Tom	Good News – Bogger Bonnie	Liz McNair (Private)	34.89	8/15f	
2023	Hollow Man	Pat C Sabbath – Leezie Lindsay	Derek Knight (Hove)	34.96	8/13f	
2024	New Destiny	Grangeview Ten – Coonough Dolly	Mark Wallis (Private)	34.63	10/11f	
2025	New Destiny	Grangeview Ten – Coonough Dolly	Mark Wallis (Private)	35.42	15/8	
