= The International (greyhounds) =

Former greyhound racing competition

- Class: Former invitation
- Location: Wimbledon
- Inaugurated: 1929
- Final run: 2002

Race information
- Surface: Sand

The International was a competition held from 1929 at Wimbledon Stadium. Inaugurated in 1929, it was originally an invitation race between the English Greyhound Derby, Welsh Greyhound Derby and Scottish Greyhound Derby winners.

== History ==
The first winner was the legendary Mick The Miller on 19 October, who defeated Back Isle (Welsh Derby winner) and Cleveralitz (Scottish Derby winner).

From 1986 until 2003 the race was known as the Byrne International because it was sponsored by owner/trainer Patsy Byrne.

== Distances ==
- 1929–1929 (550 yards)
- 1936–1974 (500 yards)
- 1975–2002 (460 metres)

== Sponsors ==
- 1986–2002 (Patsy Byrne)

== Past winners ==
Year	Winner	Trainer	Time (sec)	SP	Notes/ref
1929	Mick The Miller	Sidney Orton (Wimbledon)	32.38	4/6f	
	1930 to 1934 not held				
1935	Grand Flight II	Jim Syder Sr. (Wembley)			
1936	Minstrel Rover	Jim Syder Sr. (Wembley)	29.26	2/1	
1937	Wattle Bark	Jim Syder Sr. (Wembley)	29.67	3/1	
1938	Cinderella of Waterhall	Bill Cowell (Wembley)		20/1	
1939	Junior Classic	Joe Harmon (Wimbledon)	29.27	4/1	
1940	Rock Callan	Joe Harmon (Wimbledon)	29.80	6/4f	
1941	Rock Callan	Joe Harmon (Wimbledon)		7/1	
1942	Ballynennan Moon	Sidney Orton (Wimbledon)	28.45	1/5f	
1943	Blackwater Cutlet	Paddy Fortune (Wimbledon)	29.23	13/8f	
1944	Ballyhennessy Seal	Stan Martin (Wimbledon)	28.55	9/4	
1945	Burhill Moon	Sidney Orton (Wimbledon)	28.61	5/4f	
1946	Tonycus	Leslie Reynolds (Wembley)	28.80	4/6f	
1947	Priceless Border	Leslie Reynolds (Wembley)	28.71	5/4f	
1949	Sheevaun	Paddy Fortune (Wimbledon)	28.83	1/1f	
1950	Ballymac Ball	Stan Martin (Wimbledon)	28.33	11/8f	
1951	Ballymac Ball	Stan Martin (Wimbledon)	28.98	1/2f	
1952	Ryton Basher	Stan Martin (Wimbledon)	28.92	7/2	
1953	Home Luck	Stan Martin (Wimbledon)	28.18	7/2	
1954	Prince Chancer	Jimmy Jowett (Clapton)	28.28	4/5f	
1956	Mile Bush Champion	Paddy McEvoy (Clapton)	28.48	11/2	
1957	Kilcaskin Kern	Tony Dennis (Private)	28.43	5/2	
1958	Outside Left	Bob Burls (Wembley)	28.16	7/2	
1959	Outside Left	Bob Burls (Wembley)	28.05	5/1	
1960	Gorey Airways	Jimmy Jowett (Clapton)	28.22	11/8f	
1962	Summerhill Fancy	George Waterman (Wimbledon)	28.03		
1963	Fairys Chum	Bob Burls (Wembley)	28.04		
1964	Pineapple Joe	Dennis Hannafin (Wimbledon)	28.25		
1965	Venture Again	Dave Geggus (Walthamstow)	27.62		
1966	Dusty Trail	Paddy Milligan (Private)	27.85		
1967	Maison Fox	Jack Kinsley (Wembley)	27.81		
1968	Shady Parachute	Phil Rees Sr. (Wimbledon)	27.57		
1969	Lisamote Precept	Joe Kelly (Leeds)	28.12	6/1	
1970	Always A Monarch	Eddie Moore (White City, Man)	28.04		
1972	Cricket Bunny	Joe Booth (Private)	28.00	4/5f	
1973	Black Banjo	Barney O'Connor (Walthamstow)	28.38	1/3f	
1975	Daemonic Gambol	Paddy McEvoy (Wimbledon)			
1976	Gaily Noble	John Coleman (Wembley)	28.13	2/1	
1977	Gaily Noble	John Coleman (Wembley)	27.82	6/4f	
1978	Dolla Arkle	Paddy McEvoy (Wimbledon)	28.00		
1979	The Grand Devil	Philip Rees Jr. (Wimbledon)	27.58		Track record
1980	Upland Tiger	George Curtis (Brighton)			
1982	Gan On George	Eric Pateman (Wimbledon)			
1983	Glatton Grange	Kenny Linzell (Walthamstow)			
1984	Westmead Milos	Nick Savva (Milton Keynes)			
1985	Hong Kong Mike	Ray Andrews (Belle Vue)		3/1	
1986	Keeper Tom	Gary Baggs (Ramsgate)	27.77		
1988	Wendys Dream	Tom Foster (Wimbledon)	28.03		
1990	Yes Speedy	John McGee Sr. (Hackney)	27.77	5/2	
1991	Demesne Chance	Gunner Smith (Hove)	27.82	7/2	
1992	Summerhill Super	John Copplestone (Portsmouth)	27.61	2/1jf	
1993	Our Timmy	Jim Barrett (Cradley)	27.61	5/1	
1994	Pearls Girl	Sam Sykes (Wimbledon)	27.58	4/5f	
1995	Westmead Merlin	Nick Savva (Walthamstow)		5/1	
1997	Countrywide Ace	John Coleman (Walthamstow)	27.97	6/4f	
1998	Ground Zero	Geoff De Mulder (Private)	27.59	3/1	
1999	Tuesdays Davy	Patsy Byrne (Wimbledon)	28.10	7/2	
2000	Knockanroe Rover	Paul Stringer (Private)	27.71	6/4f	
2001	Rackethall Jet	Patsy Byrne (Wimbledon)	27.72	6/4f	
2002	Farmhouse Gold	Brian Clemenson (Hove)	27.87	5/2	
