= Wembley Spring Cup =

Spring Cup
- Location: Wembley Stadium
- Inaugurated: 1930
- Final run: 1980

Race information
- Distance: 525 yards/490 metres

The Wembley Spring Cup was a greyhound racing competition held annually at Wembley Stadium. It was inaugurated in 1930, one of the earliest competitions. The race changed its name to the Blue Riband in 1981.

Following the end of the Wembley Greyhounds the Blue Riband was transferred to Greyhound Racing Association (GRA) sister track Hall Green in 1999.

== Winners ==
Year	Winner	Breeding	Trainer	Time	SP	Notes
1930	Mick the Miller	Glorious Event - Na Boc Lei	Sidney Orton (Wimbledon)	30.56	1-1f	
1931	Mick the Miller	Glorious Event - Na Boc Lei	Sidney Orton (Wimbledon)	30.04	1-3f	Track record
1932	Future Cutlet	Mutton Cutlet - Wary Guide	Sidney Probert (Wembley)	29.81		
1933	Goopy Gear		Arthur Doc Callanan (Wembley)	30.46	4-6f	
1934	Black Warrior	Wily Warrior - Cook	Paddy Fortune (Wimbledon)	30.75	7-1	
1935	Suil King	Eagles Beak – Cahirvough Lass	Arthur Doc Callanan (Wembley)	30.47	5-4f	
1936	Suil King	Eagles Beak – Cahirvough Lass	Arthur Doc Callanan (Wembley)	30.31	7-4	
1937	Shandy Gaff	Generous Nobleman – Share Call	Sidney Orton (Wimbledon)	30.15		
1938	Sheehan		Joe Harmon (Wimbledon)	30.18	4-1	Dead-heat
1938	Golden Safeguard	Red Robin – Ellen Beaton	Jack Harvey (Wembley)	30.18	10-1	Dead-heat
1939	Gretas Rosary	Mick the Miller - Greta Ranee	Eddie Wright (Harringay)	30.39	5-2	
1940	Junior Classic	Beef Cutlet-Lady Eleanor	Joe Harmon (Wimbledon)	29.60		
1941	Rochester Clipper		Miss Olive Motchman (Park Royal)	29.92	10-1	
1942	Dearlaw	Lovable Outlaw – Sly Coon	Paddy Fortune (Wimbledon)	30.48	33-1	
1943	Flying Dart II	Shove Halfpenny – Osborne Peggy	Sid Jennings (Wembley)	29.59	2-1f	
1944	Disputed Rattler	Dasher Lad – Cheer The Rattler	Sidney Orton (Wimbledon)	29.58	1-2f	
1945	Ballyhennessy Seal	Lone Seal - Canadian Glory	Stan Martin (Wimbledon)	29.45	5-4f	
1946	MacRamble		(West Ham)	29.72		
1948	Whiterock Abbey	Farloe Cutlet - Acetone	Sidney Orton (Wimbledon)	29.68	10-1	Dead-heat
1948	Don Gipsey	Kusta Bok – Smartly Sally	Leslie Reynolds (Wembley)	29.68	1-1f	Dead-heat
1949	West End Dasher	Smartly Fergus – Second Fiddle	Bob Burls (Wembley)	29.62	13-8f	
1950	Greenwood Tanist	Tanner Trial – Manly Marie	Leslie Reynolds (Wembley)	29.44	11-10f	
1950	Black Mire	Darkies Gift - Kelton Flash	Jack Toseland (Perry Barr)	29.34	2-1	
1952	Jeffs Pal	Ballyguiltenane Tom – Caherlevoy Beauty	Leslie Reynolds (Wembley)	29.26	13-8jf	
1953	Bargain Hunter	Burhill Moon – Black Hussy	Fred Lugg (Brighton)	29.01	8-1	
1954	Pauls Fun	Sandown Champion - All Fun	Leslie Reynolds (Wembley)	29.23	4-6f	
1956	Northern King	Champion Prince – Big Bawn	Jack Harvey (Wembley)	29.40	2-5f	
1958	Kilcaskin Kern	Magourna Reject - Pavona	Tony Dennis (Private)	29.39	9-4	
1959	Mile Bush Pride	The Grand Champion – Witching Dancer	Jack Harvey (Wembley)	29.07	11-8	
1960	Mile Bush Pride	The Grand Champion – Witching Dancer	Jack Harvey (Wembley)	29.14	1-2f	
1961	Long Span	Solar Prince – Monas Dancer	Leslie Reynolds (Wembley)	29.41		
1965	Cons Duke	Crazy Parachute – Cons Diet	Lionel Maxen (Private)	29.50		
1966	Petes Regret	Mad Era - Hapless	Bob Burls (Wembley)	29.87		
1967	Dusty Trail	Printers Present - Dolores Daughter	Paddy Milligan (Private)	29.26		
1968	Butchers Tec	Booked Out - Technician	Ronnie Melville (Wembley)	29.27		
1969	Ballyseedy Star	Shanes Legacy – Ballyseedy Jay	Peter Hawkesley (West Ham)	29.61	11-8f	
1970	Hymus Silver	Oregon Prince – Little Scamp	Paddy Milligan (Private)	29.87	7-1	
1971	Dolores Rocket	Newdown Heather - Come On Dolores	Herbert White (Private)	29.30		
1972	Proud Gamble	Silver Hope – Big Gamble	Bob Burls (Wembley)	29.56	3-1	
1973	Shara Dee	Silver Hope – Silver Minnie	Noreen Collin (White City, London)	29.25	9-2	
1974	Mountleader Gold	The Grand Silver – Perfect Anna	(Wembley)	29.31		
1975	Pineapple Grand	The Grand Silver – Pineapple Baby	Frank Baldwin (Perry Barr)	29.78		
1976	Knockrour Bank	Clomoney Jet – Damsels Lass	John Coleman (Wembley)	29.01	7-4	
1977	Linacre	Lively Band - Certral	Ted Dickson (Slough)	29.20	10-3	
1978	Law Lad	Toms Pal -Alas	Paddy Milligan (Private)	29.02		
1980	Linkside Champ			29.62		

== Venues & distances ==
- 1930-1980 (Wembley 525y/490m)
