= 1929 UK & Ireland Greyhound Racing Year =

The 1929 UK & Ireland Greyhound Racing Year was the fourth year of greyhound racing in the United Kingdom and the third year of greyhound racing in Ireland.

== Summary ==
1929 was an unusual year for greyhound racing because the boom experienced during the two previous years suddenly slowed. The total annual attendance across the country for 1929 increased slightly to 15,855,162 from 13,695,275 (in 1928). Prize money was cut and the construction of new greyhound tracks had slowed down dramatically. The fledgling industry had seemingly reached a peak but the arrival of Mick the Miller from Ireland was about to make greyhound racing the nation's pastime.

The public flocked in their tens of thousands to watch the first star of greyhound racing; he had arrived from Ireland with eleven wins from fifteen including winning the Spring Cup and National Cup at Shelbourne Park. The £10 entry fee was sent to London after the National Cup so that he could travel over for the 1929 English Greyhound Derby. Mick the Miller broke the 30 second barrier for 525 yards recording 29.82 in first round qualifying that led to his owner Father Martin Brophy auctioning his star on the terrace steps. He sold to a London Bookmaker Albert Williams for 800 guineas. It was huge amount of money in 1929 and was well documented in the evening newspapers. The bid beat off an attempt by Wimbledon deputy chairman Arundel Kempton to buy the brindle dog. Mick the Miller went on to win the Derby and would take up residence at the Burhill kennels of Sidney Orton when in December Arundel Kempton finally got his dog, he purchased Mick the Miller for an incredible £2,000 as a present to his wife.

=== Tracks ===
Romford Greyhound Track was opened on 21 June, a local businessman Archer Leggett and his brother in law put down £400 to equip a small piece of land near the Crown Hotel in London Road. Privately owned greyhounds would race around a track chasing a hare powered by an old Ford car engine. It was one of four independent tracks to open, another one was Crooked Billet, the precursor of Walthamstow Stadium.

Southampton was purchased by the Hampshire Greyhound Racing Syndicate from the Southampton Greyhound Racing Company but Charles Knott retained control. Blackpool decided to take independent status on 29 July and two new tracks Mansfield and Doncaster were both banned from the NGRC after a breach of the rules of racing and the refusal to comply with the NGRC stewards.

The Southend-On-Sea syndicate of Shand, Wilson and Bilsland moved their entire operation, greyhounds included by train to take over Stanley in Liverpool. Stanley was sold to the Electric Hare Company by the GRA and prospered.

=== News ===
Wimbledon introduced weighing scales at their kennels so that the racing public could be issued with the greyhounds weights before racing. Wimbledon would be at the forefront of experimentation and enterprise. Trainer Harry Leader left the track to return to Ireland and was replaced by Sidney Orton.

A greyhound called Idle Chief won 16 consecutive races at Slough.

=== Competitions ===
After the Derby, Mick the Miller went on to win the inaugural International, held on 19 October, defeating Back Isle (Welsh Derby winner) and Cleveralitz (Scottish Derby winner). He also took on the Welsh dog Back Isle in two match races. Mick the Miller lost to Back Isle in the race at White City Stadium, Cardiff but gained revenge a week later at Wimbledon.

Back Isle also claimed the Welsh Greyhound Derby and in the Grand National competition Levator trained by Bob Burls at Wembley won the final by no less than 12 lengths. The win was Levator's 13th win from 29 races but he died shortly afterwards following a tragic kennel fight.

The leading bitch in racing, Bradshaw Fold, was unlucky when finishing runner up in both the Oaks and Cesarewitch. Two new events were introduced, both for puppies. They were The Puppy Derby at Wimbledon and the Trafalgar Cup at Wembley. The first running of both competitions ended with So Green trained by Jim Syder taking the honours.

The St Leger provided a bizarre incident, in the first semi-final the Paddy McEllistrim pair of Loughnagare and Sonnie Hale qualified for the final and awaited opposition. The second semi-final started with Fleeting Fashion disqualified for interference and a re-run was ordered. The re-run then saw Starman disqualified leaving Keen Goer and Ham Sandwich with places in the final without having to qualify.

== Tracks opened ==
Date	Stadium/Track	Location
21 June	Romford Greyhound Track	Romford
unknown	Bedwellty Greyhound Track	Bedwellty
unknown	Crooked Billet	London

== Roll of honour ==
Major Winners
Award	Name of Winner
1929 English Greyhound Derby	Mick the Miller
1929 Irish Greyhound Derby+	Jack Bob
1929 Scottish Greyhound Derby	Clevaralitz
1929 Welsh Greyhound Derby	Back Isle

+ unofficial National Derby

== Principal UK races ==
Scottish Greyhound Derby, Carntyne (Jun 22, 525y, £60)
Pos	Name of Greyhound	Trainer	SP	Time	Trap
1st	Clevaralitz	Alf Mulliner	30.87	3-1	5
2nd	Levenet		30.95	5-1	2
3rd	War Cloud		30.96	6-1	4
u	Dee Light			1-1f	
u	Dull Light			8-1	
u	Glanyllan			8-1	

Welsh Derby, White City (Cardiff) (Aug 17, 525y, £130)
Pos	Name of Greyhound	Trainer	SP	Time	Trap
1st	Back Isle	Cronin	4-9f	29.67	4
2nd	Buckna Boy	Renwick (Southampton)	5-2	30.31	2
3rd	Bright Laddie		25-1	30.55	3
4th	Full State		25-1		1

Oaks, White City (Aug 29, 525y, £500)
Pos	Name of Greyhound	Trainer	SP	Time	Trap
1st	Bewitching Eve	Richard Cooper	3/1	30.33	1
2nd	Bradshaw Fold	Marshall	10/11f	30.57	2
3rd	Tullykin Lass	Joe Harmon	5/2	30.73	4
4th	Melksham Edith	Sid Jennings	20/1		3

Grand National, White City (Sep 19, 525y h, £350)
Pos	Name of Greyhound	Trainer	SP	Time	Trap
1st	Levator	Bob Burls	2-1	31.09	2
2nd	Honeymans Last	Stanley Biss	4-7f	32.05	3
3rd	Craw Sick	Joe Harmon	8-1	32.21	1
4th	Snowden Range	(Manchester)	20-1		4

Scurry Gold Cup, Clapton (Sep 28, 400y, £300)
Pos	Name of Greyhound	Trainer	SP	Time	Trap
1st	Loose Card	J Madden	100-8	24.13+	1
2nd	Tullykin Lass	Joe Harmon	2-1	24.21	5
3rd	Doubtful Dick	W Taylor	6-1	24.29	4
u	Nippy Knight	(Kings Heath)	100-8		
u	Melksham Dodger	Thomas Cudmore	6-4f		
u	Cruiseline Boy		5-1		

+ Track Record

Cesarewitch, West Ham (Oct 26, 600y, £100)
Pos	Name of Greyhound	Trainer	SP	Time	Trap
1st	Five of Hearts	Thomas Cudmore	1-4f	34.82	4
2nd	Bradshaw Fold	Marshall	6-1	34.98	1
3rd	Trump		8-1	35.38	3
4th	Gay Cavalier	Jimmy Lowther	20-1		2

St Leger, Wembley (Nov 25, 700y, £375)
Pos	Name of Greyhound	Trainer	SP	Time	Trap
1st	Loughnagare	Paddy McEllistrim	4-9f	42.76	2
2nd	Sonnie Hale	Paddy McEllistrim	9-2	42.92	4
3rd	Keen Goer		8-1	43.12	3
4th	Ham Sandwich		8-1		1

== Principal Irish finals ==
Easter Cup, Shelbourne (525y, 15 April)
Pos	Name of Greyhound	SP	Time
1st	Odd Blade	4-1	30.71
2nd	Mick The Miller	7-1	30.75
u	Entomb	8-1	
u	Captured Half	4-6f	
u	Loughadian	6-1	
u	Little Echo	20-1	

Grand National, Harold's Cross (525 H, 6 September)
Pos	Name of Greyhound	SP	Time
1st	Merry Falcon		32.50
2nd	Model Image		
u	Broncho Boy		
u	Fern Hill		

Trigo Cup, Celtic Park (640y, 27 Sep)
Pos	Name of Greyhound	SP	Time
1st	Black Scab	9-4	37.00
2nd	Dragon's Flight	6-4f	37.01
3rd	Galway Prince	11-4	
4th	Spring Forward	6-1	

== Key ==
U = unplaced 0.08 = 1 length
