= Trigo Cup =

Former Irish greyhound racing competition

Trigo Cup / Ulster Derby
- Location: Celtic Park
- Inaugurated: 1929
- Final run: 1980

Race information
- Distance: 525 yards

The Trigo Cup also known as the Ulster Greyhound Derby was a greyhound racing competition held annually at Celtic Park in Belfast, Northern Ireland.

It was introduced in 1926 when William Barnett presented a cup to Celtic Park after his horse Trigo won The Derby and St Leger Stakes. The first winner was Black Scab and the Trigo Cup would gain classic status some years later in 1944.

From 1966 it was sponsored by Guinness and became known as the Guinness Ulster Derby and Trigo Cup. The race ended following the closure of Celtic Park.

== Venues & Distances ==
- 1929–1931 (Celtic Park, 640y)
- 1932–1933 (Celtic Park, 600y)
- 1935–1940 (Celtic Park, 550y)
- 1944–1980 (Celtic Park, 525y)

== Sponsors ==
- 1966–1980 (Guinness)

== Past winners ==
Year	Winner	Breeding	Time (sec)	Trainer	SP	Notes/ref
1929	Black Scab	Speedy Kaiser - Julia	37.00	George Lowe	9/4	
1930	Filon	Kashmir Kernel – Barr Buadh	37.40	J Daley	100/14	
1931	Bright Brindle	Happy Hal – Miss Craig	37.67	John Baird	6/4f	
1932	Jack Knows	Craft Toledo – Drapers Daisy	35.15	J Daley		
1933	Rustic Martin	Real Rustic – Martive	34.64	Bill Hoysted	4/6f	
1934	not held					
1935	Maghereagh Soldier	Inler – Finn Nuala	31.45 TR	Mick Horan	1/2f	
1936	Maghereagh Soldier	Inler – Finn Nuala	31.40	Mick Horan	1/3f	
1937	Maghereagh Soldier	Inler – Finn Nuala	31.80	Mick Horan	5/2	
1938	Strong Mutton	Rosedale's Mutton – Mountain Trail	31.34	P G Smyth	9/4	
1939	Fearless Gaughan	Mr Moon – Gaughan's Bridge	31.72	Frank Gaynor	4/9f	
1940	Fearless Gaughan	Mr Moon – Gaughan's Bridge	31.56	Frank Gaynor	11/10	
1941–1943 not held due to World War II
1944	Fair Brook	Lights of Brooklyn – Rose of Castledown	29.95			
1945	Lilacs Luck	Printer – Wilton Sandills	29.65	Johnny Woods		
1946	Miltiades	Manhattan Midnight – Ocean Craft	29.62			
1947	Ballymore Cottage	–	29.38	J McMullan	5/1	Track record
1948	Manley Creamery	–	29.66			
1949	Astra's Nephew	Darkies Gift – Crohill Side	29.90			
1950	Fine Sprig	Sprig of Munster – Claire's Colleen	29.85			
1951	Lucky Blackbird	Lucky Tanist – Coolagarranroe Lass	29.72			
1952	Outcast Surprise	Ballybeg Surprise – Outcast Queen	29.69			
1953	Flashy Name	–	29.79			
1954	Moyola Flash	Daring Flash – Culbane Mill	29.39			
1955	Shauns Tip	–	29.42			
1956	Howardstown Tonic	Maddest Neighbour – Betting Tonic	29.29			
1957	Nimble Star	Champion Prince – Drumskea Colleen	29.70			
1958	Drumskea Champion	–	29.70	Davie Carmichael		
1959	Bermudas Cloud	Prince of Bermuda – Seafield Biddy	29.16			
1960	Laurdella Prince	–	29.58			
1961	Ashley Park Ranger	Man of Pleasure – Cindy	29.20			
1962	Ballyshoneen Plucky	–	29.62			
1963	Memory Lane	Cheers Again – Bad Measure	29.60			
1964	Bannside King	Demon King – Lady Aron	29.38	W Rainey		
1965	Montorte Malina	Hi There – Fairy Julia	29.42	Louis Forte	10/1	
1966	Woodlawn	Jockey's Glen – Direct Lead	29.40			
1967	Super Quick	Knock Hill Chieftain – Millie's Dillie	29.15			
1968	Drumna Chestnut	Bermudas Cloud – Drumna Snowdrop	29.27			
1969	Bill of Sale	–	29.57			
1970	Jemmy John	Prairie Flash – Fawn Deer	28.61	Eddie Jones		
1971	Super Trust	–	29.54			
1972	Clackmore Island	–	29.73			
1973	Its a Witch	Yanka Boy – Itsamint	28.80			
1974	Moordyke Maxi	–	29.16			
1975	Piping Rock	Ramdeen Stuart – Edenberry Glow	29.60			
1976	Croft Lass	Own Pride – Ballygally Queen	29.40			
1977	Backdeed Man	Flaming King – Beachwalk Lady	29.40	David McClenaghan		
1978	16 June					
1980	Ballinfonta Hero	Ballyglass Lundy – Mauras Yarn	29.51	Jackie Flynn		

Discontinued
