= 1929 English Greyhound Derby =

- Location: White City Stadium
- Start date: 10 July
- End date: 25 July
- Total prize money: £700 (winner)

The 1929 Greyhound Derby Final took place on 25 July 1929 at White City Stadium. The winner Mick the Miller received a first prize of £700 in a final with only four runners.

== Final result ==
At White City (over 525 yards):

Position	Name of Greyhound	Breeding	Trap	SP	Time	Trainer
1st	Mick the Miller	Glorious Event - Na Boc Lei	4	4-7f	29.96	Mick Horan (Shelbourne Park)
2nd	Palatinus	Lax Law - Fly Again	2	3-1	30.18	T.W.King (Unknown)
3rd	Entomb	Spalding Bishop - Another 10	3	9-2	30.34	Joe Harmon (White City - London)
4th	Beadsman	Ballyshannon - Larva	1	25-1	30.58	W Taylor (Glasgow)

=== Distances ===
2¾, 2, 3 (lengths)
The distances between the greyhounds are in finishing order and shown in lengths. From 1927-1950 one length was equal to 0.06 of one second but race times are shown as 0.08 as per modern day calculations.

== Review ==
Boher Ash returned to defend his title but Palatinus and Mutable were installed joint favourites with Buckna Boy just behind them in the ante-post market. Mick the Miller had travelled from Ireland with his trainer Mick Horan and owner Father Martin Brophy, Mick the Miller's old rival Hidden Jew was now trained by Sidney Orton.

During the first qualifying heats on Thursday 10 July Palatinus won in 30.22 at odds of 3-1 on. The next evening on the Friday 11 July, Mick the Miller (who was due to run his heat the following Tuesday) had his first trial at White City and recorded a 30.03 secs, which was one spot (0.01 sec) quicker than the world record time over 525 yards but did not constitute a world record because it was a trial and not a race. Boher Ash progressed through his heat on the second qualifying session and then on the Tuesday the third and final qualifying took place and Mick the Miller broke the 30 second barrier and world record for the 525 yards recording 29.82. One of his main threats Mutable was knocked out in his heat losing to 10-1 shot Dollinger in 30.50.

There was a significant interest to buy Mick the Miller immediately after the race and his owner Father Martin Brophy decided there and then to auction the dog on the terrace steps. He sold him to a London Bookmaker called Albert Williams for 800 guineas. It was huge amount for a greyhound at that time and was deal was reported in the national newspapers that evening. The 800 guineas bid beat off an attempt by Wimbledon deputy chairman Arundel Kempton to buy the brindle.

The second round saw Boher Ash eliminated but Mick the Miller won by 8 lengths in 30.45 at odds of 4-1 on. Buckna Boy defeated Palatinus and another greyhound called Entomb equalled Mick the Miller's time of 30.45 in winning.

The semi-finals were duly won by Mick the Miller (29.98) and Entomb (30.16). Entomb qualified by beating Beadsman by 4 lengths with the Southampton trained Buckna Boy going out. Mick the Miller defeated Palatinus by just two lengths.

For the only time in events history the final was to be contested by just four runners. The Greyhound Racing Association (GRA) wanted a clean run race and thought that four competitors would guarantee this. Mick the Miller, running from trap 4, was made the 7/4 on favourite, while Palatinus, from trap 2, was installed at 3/1. Entomb, the original ante-post favourite, was 9/2 and the outsider from trap 1 was Beadsman who went off at 25/1.

The supposed guaranteed clean race involving just four runners was not to be. Palatinus led on the rails and won easily because Mick the Miller went a little wide out of the trap and bumped into and knocked over Entomb at the first bend. Beadsmen also found trouble but the klaxon sounded for a no race which surprised many because no greyhound had fought. Just 30 minutes later the Derby was re-run and Palatinus led once again on the rails, but Mick the Miller was close up at the first bend and took over at the second bend. He went on to win in a time of 29.96, winning by 3 lengths from Palatinus, with Entomb back in third.

Mick the Miller remained in England and took up residence at the kennels of Sidney Orton, (the same Burhill kennels where he had been housed for the Derby in Paddy McEllistrim' range. Both men were based at Wimbledon Stadium. Father Brophy went back to Ireland considerably richer whilst his trainer Mick Horan returned to Ireland publicly upset after failing to be consulted about the sale.

== See also ==
- 1929 UK & Ireland Greyhound Racing Year
