= 1931 English Greyhound Derby =

- Location: White City Stadium

The 1931 Greyhound Derby took place during June with the final being held on 27 June 1931 at White City Stadium. The winner Seldom Led received a first prize of £1,050 after the final was re-run.

== Final result ==
At White City (over 525 yards):

Position	Name of Greyhound	Breeding	Trap	SP	Time	Trainer
1st	Seldom Led	Society Boy - Pity	4	7-2	30.04	Wally Green (West Ham)
2nd	Golden Hammer	Red Gauntlet II - Just Look	1	3-1	30.36	Jim Syder Sr. (Wembley)
3rd	Micks Fancy	Macoma - Bright Emblem	3	6-1	30.44	Reg Bosley (Private)
4th	Mick the Miller	Glorious Event - Na Boc Lei	6	1-1f	30.52	Sidney Orton (Wimbledon)
5th	Brunswick Bill	Empire Billy - Virile Attack	5	5-1	30.60	Sid Jennings (Harringay)
N/R	Ryland R	Mutton Cutlet - Hunters Ghost	2		disq	Arthur 'Doc' Callanan (Wembley)

=== Distances ===
4, 1, 1, 1 (lengths) The distances between the greyhounds are in finishing order and shown in lengths. From 1927-1950 one length was equal to 0.06 of one second but race times are shown as 0.08 as per modern day calculations.

== First Final (declared No Race) ==
No Race Final
Pos	Name of Greyhound
1st	Mick the Miller
2nd	Golden Hammer
3rd	Ryland R
4th	Mick's Fancy
5th	Brunswick Bill
6th	Seldom Led

== Semi finals ==
Second Semi Final (Jun 20)
Pos	Name of Greyhound	SP	Time
1st	Ryland R	5-4f	30.20
2nd	Mick the Miller	2-1	30.24
3rd	Brunswick Bill	10-1	30.36
u	Curious Micky	100-6	
u	Ardmore's Hawk	33-1	
u	Lions Share	7-2	

== Review ==
Mick the Miller's unprecedented attempt to win a third Greyhound Derby started with the first round exit of Maidens Boy trained by Young. According to his connections the highly fancied runner had been 'got at' after the greyhound came out of his kennels ill and received veterinary treatment for two days before his heat. Micks Fancy, son of Mick the Miller's brother Macoma provided a shock in round one by beating Mick the Miller.

In the second round an Irish greyhound Ryland R broke the track record when winning in 29.69 beating Mick the Miller in the process. Unfortunately Ryland R had suffered a toe injury in the victory and his trainer Arthur 'Doc' Callanan had to treat the dog. Callanan was the same person responsible for saving Mick the Miller's life back a few years previously.

A rematch in the semi-final once again saw Ryland R defeat Mick the Miller but this time just by half a length.

A crowd of 70,000 watched the final and as the race progressed Ryland R built up a clear lead from first bend until halfway when Seldom Lad then began to challenge. Mick the Miller used his usual track craft to also come into contention and Golden Hammer also began to run on. Around the final bend Mick the Miller and Golden Hammer took the lead because Ryland R and Seldom Led had swung off wide. Mick the Miller prevailed by a head but the klaxon sounded before he crossed the winning line. The rules in force at the time stated that if a greyhound fought and ruined the result of a race that a re-run would be required. The stewards claimed that Ryland R had attacked Seldom Lad on the fourth bend which accounted for the pair moving off wide. A re-run was ordered without the offender Ryland R. Thirty minuted later Seldom Lad ran on strongly to prevail by 4 lengths, with Golden Hammer holding on for second and Mick's Fancy running on into third. Mick the Miller was never a force and came home fourth. Seldom Lad had been a £5 purchase for his owners H Hammond and J Fleming.

The re-run clearly affected Mick because of his age, with several believing that the race should not have been re-run. However it was Seldom Led that was leading the original race when he was attacked by Ryland R, so justice could be seen as being served. It is a well-known fact within the industry that ungenuine greyhounds can move wide on the fourth bend and run-in to fight.

== See also ==
- 1931 UK & Ireland Greyhound Racing Year
