= Greyhound Derby =

Greyhound Derby can refer to one of several competitions for racing greyhounds;

- English Greyhound Derby, run at Towcester Greyhound Stadium
- Irish Greyhound Derby, run at Shelbourne Park
- Scottish Greyhound Derby, discontinued event run at Shawfield Stadium until 2019
- Welsh Greyhound Derby, discontinued event run at Cardiff Arms Park until 1977
