= 1930 UK & Ireland Greyhound Racing Year =

- Mick The Miller won the English Derby

The 1930 UK & Ireland Greyhound Racing Year was the fifth year of greyhound racing in the United Kingdom and the fourth year of greyhound racing in Ireland.

== Summary ==
Mick the Miller now trained by Sidney Orton successfully defended his English Greyhound Derby title and in the process propelled greyhound racing into a boom period that would last for over thirty years. A crowd of 50,000 witnessed the brindle dog win the 1930 English Greyhound Derby at White City Stadium on 28 June.

Following the Derby win, he then won the Cesarewitch at West Ham Stadium over the longer distance of 600 yards and the Welsh Greyhound Derby at White City Stadium, Cardiff, winning the final by ten lengths in a new track and national record of 29.55. His season ended when he finished lame during the Laurels, a new event introduced at Wimbledon Stadium. The total annual attendance across the country for 1930 increased to 17,119,120 from 15,855,162 (in 1929), a fourth consecutive annual increase.

=== Tracks ===
The Greyhound Racing Association (GRA) continued to acquire tracks and purchased White City Stadium (Manchester) from the Canine Sports Ltd company. The circuit was 450 yards in circumference with wide well banked turns and an inside Sumner hare. Further tracks continued to open including Charlton and the Irish tracks of Dundalk and Tralee. Romford moved to a new site after £600 was raised to build a stand in a nearby field next to the original site. The independent track (flapping track) in Portsmouth closed down on 29 November due to plans to open a larger track nearby at Target Road.

=== News ===
Trainers Stanley Biss and Ken Appleton left Wimbledon for West Ham. John Bilsland bought out Jimmy Shand for £400,000 leaving the Electric Hare Company under the control of Bilsland. Blinkers were used at Wimbledon for the first and only time, the experiment to stop ungenuine greyhounds from fighting failed.

=== Competitions ===
Bradshaw Fold was the leading bitch in training and the unluckiest because following her second place to Mick the Miller in the Derby final, she was unplaced in a second consecutive Oaks final. Fellow Derby finalist So Green also reached the St Leger final, the last major race of the year.

== Tracks opened ==
Date	Stadium/Track	Location
9 April	Kingdom Greyhound Stadium	Tralee
15 May	Clydeholm	Glasgow
20 July	Charlton Stadium	London
2 September	Royal Gymnasium Ground	Edinburgh
2 September	Nelson Recreation Ground	Glasgow
29 October	Dundalk Ramparts Greyhound Stadium	Dundalk
29 October	Firs Park	Falkirk
13 December	County Ground Stadium	Exeter
unknown	Battersea Greyhound Track	London
unknown	Dagenham Greyhound Track	London

== Roll of honour ==
Major Winners
Award	Name of Winner
1930 English Greyhound Derby	Mick the Miller
1930 Irish Greyhound Derby+	Prince Fern
1930 Scottish Greyhound Derby	Captured Half
1930 Welsh Greyhound Derby	Mick the Miller

+ unofficial National Derby

== Principal UK races ==
Cesarewitch, West Ham (July 12, 600y, £1,000)
Pos	Name of Greyhound	Trainer	SP	Time (sec)	Trap
1st	Mick the Miller	Sidney Orton	1-7f	34.11	2
2nd	Five of Hearts	Thomas Cudmore	100-8	34.35	6
3rd	Killowen	Sidney Orton	66-1	34.51	3
u	Johnny Canuck	(Manchester)	66-1		1
u	Buckna Boy	W. L. Renwick	25-1		4
u	Bradshaw Fold	Stanley Biss	100-8		5

Scottish Greyhound Derby, Carntyne (Jul 26, 525y, £100)
Pos	Name of Greyhound	Trainer	SP	Time	Trap
1st	Captured Half	Stanley Biss	1-5f	30.30	2
2nd	Redlaw		20-1	30.62	3
3rd	Maori Chief		10-1	30.66	1
u	Dio Dorus		20-1		3
u	Nafferton		8-1		4
u	Sister Olive		10-1		5

Scurry Gold Cup, Clapton (Aug 2, 400y, £600)
Pos	Name of Greyhound	Trainer	SP	Time	Trap
1st	Barlock	John 'Jack' Kennedy	100-7	24.19	4
2nd	Never Certain	Jimmy Lowther	8-1	24.43	3
3rd	Moss Knowe	Jimmy Lowther	3-1	24.67	1
u	Bright Bass	W. L. Renwick	100-7		5
u	Flying Shamrock		7-1		2
u	Tipperary Boy	Darlington	11-10f		6

Welsh Derby, White City (Cardiff) (Aug 9, 525y, £115)
Pos	Name of Greyhound	Trainer	SP	Time	Trap
1st	Mick the Miller	Sidney Orton	1-8f	29.55+	2
2nd	Barleybee	WC Cardiff	100-6	30.35	3
3rd	Hydrometer	Sidney Orton	33-1	30.43	1
4th	Filon	Slough		10-1	4

+ Track record

Oaks, White City (Aug 9, 525y, £300)
Pos	Name of Greyhound	Trainer	SP	Time	Trap
1st	Faithful Kitty	Stanley Biss	4-6f	30.02	5
2nd	Toftwood Misery	Sidney Orton	3-1	30.34	4
3rd	Small Cutlet	K.W. Wilmot	25-1	30.50	1
u	Melksham Firefly		100-6		2
u	Fixture	Ellen Pennington	10-1		3
u	Bradshaw Fold	Patrick McKinney	5-1		5

Grand National, White City (Aug 16, 525y h, £300)
Pos	Name of Greyhound	Trainer	SP	Time	Trap
1st	Stylish Cutlet	Jock Hutchinson	11-4	30.94	4
2nd	Killing Pace	Paddy McEllistrim	8-1	31.06	1
3rd	Rathwire	Sidney Orton	4-7f	31.10	2
4th	Firework	Paddy McEllistrim	5-1		3

Laurels, Wimbledon (Sep 13, 500y, £1,232)
Pos	Name of Greyhound	Trainer	SP	Time	Trap
1st	Kilbrean Boy	Sidney Orton	10-1	29.20	2
2nd	Clandown Sweep	Sidney Orton	5-1	29.68	1
3rd	Toftwood Misery	Sidney Orton	5-1	29.76	4
u	Jack Bob	Bill Fear	2-1f		3
u	Wild Warrior II	Thomas Cudmore	9-4		5
u	Mick McGee	Jimmy Lowther	100-6		6

St Leger, Wembley (Oct 4, 700y, £750)
Pos	Name of Greyhound	Trainer	SP	Time	Trap
1st	Maiden's Boy	Samuel Young	4-9f	41.48	1
2nd	Loughnagare	Charles Cross	100-8	42.04	3
3rd	So Green	Jim Syder Sr.	6-1	42.07	4
4th	Prince Fern	J Harper	9-2		2

== Principal Irish finals ==
Easter Cup, Shelbourne (525y, 7 May £100)
Pos	Name of Greyhound	SP	Time
1st	Hanna's Pup (J McCarthy)		30.59
2nd	Meadow Fescue (Murphy)		
u	Liam Paddy (Purcell)		
u	Other Days (Horan)		
u	Cutlet's Fiancee (Power)		
u	Krazy (Boulger)		

Grand National, Harold's Cross (525 H, 2 September, £80)
Pos	Name of Greyhound	SP	Time
1st	Captain Koehl (Carroll)		32.20
2nd	Broncho Boy (Oakley)		32.22
3rd	Cross Dagger (O'Connor)		32.24
4th	Bon Bon (O'Reilly)		

Trigo Cup, Celtic Park (640y, 6 June, £100)
Pos	Name of Greyhound	SP	Time
1st	Filon (W O'Donnell)	100-14	37.40
2nd	Krazy (Boulger)	6-4f	37.44
3rd	Brokerstown (McKee)	9-4	37.54
4th	Galway Prince (McAlevey)	3-1	37.68

Oaks, Harold's Cross (525y, 12 September)
Pos	Name of Greyhound	SP	Time
1st	Keerie Brave (Richard Keane)		30.90
2nd	Cutlet's Fiancee (Quirke)		30.92
u	Marlinstown Lass (William Lynam)		
u	Guide Me Home (O'Gorman)		
u	Bevidy (John Ryan)		
u	Radiograph (Ryan)		

== Key ==
U = unplaced
