= Grand National (Irish greyhound race) =

Former Greyhound racing competition in Ireland

Irish Grand National
- Class: Feature
- Inaugurated: 1928
- Final run: 2020
- Sponsor: Greyhound & Petworld Luxury Transport

Race information
- Distance: 525 yards hurdles
- Surface: Sand
- Qualification: hurdlers only

The Grand National was a greyhound racing competition held annually at various tracks throughout Ireland.

The race was inaugurated in 1928 at Shelbourne Park and was shared between the two Dublin tracks of Shelbourne and Harold's Cross Stadium before being switched to the old Cork (Western Road) Greyhound Stadium just before World War II.

Kilkenny Greyhound Stadium hosted the race in 1960 & 1961 until Thurles Greyhound Stadium took over from 1962 to 1984. The competition returned to Shelbourne in 1985 for another 15 years but once again the nomadic race switched to Harold's Cross and was staged from 2001 to 2016 at the track. Following the closure of Harold's Cross, the event was switched to Cork in 2017.

It was the leading hurdle event in Ireland and an integral part of the Irish greyhound racing calendar. The event came to an end after the 2020 edition.

== Winners ==
| Year | Winner | Breeding | Time (sec) | Trainer | SP | Ref |
|---|---|---|---|---|---|---|
| 1928 | The Tanker | Steam Drifter – Border Gift | | Horan | 4/1 | |
| 1929 | Merry Falcon | | 32.50 | Magner | | |
| 1930 | Captain Koehle | Creaves - Glenville Girl | 32.20 | Carroll | | |
| 1932 | Cowboy II | Halifax – Saucy Nell | 31.94 | | 1/1f | |
| 1933 | Hot Shot | Solid Man – Cosa Bana | 32.14 | | 5/4 | |
| 1934 | Hot Shot | Solid Man – Cosa Bana | | | | |
| 1935 | Orluck | Mutton Cutlet - Sairshea | | | | |
| 1936 | Druze | Red House – Black Looks | 31.21 | Joe McKenna | 1/1f | |
| 1937 | Cheers For Ballyduff | Hes Next – Noomans Fancy | | V.O'Donoghue | | |
| 1938 | Pals Rover | Roving Bunty – Palnetto | 31.28 | G Hely | 2/1 | |
| 1939 | Lawyers Bouquet | Lawyers Fee - Dunmurry Princess | 30.93 | P.Kelly | 9/4 | |
| 1940 | Ballymakeera Gift | Ammon Carb – Old Capwell | 31.17 | J. Curtin | 2/1 | |
| 1941 | The Gunner | Gay Brigade – La Lavelle | 31.03 | Miss K.Nolan | 4/5f | |
| 1959 | Dually Rapid | Ballymac Ball - Marchioness Minnie | 31.15 | | | |
| 1960 | Dawn Dancer | Prince of Bermuda – Peaceful Dancer | 31.40 | | | |
| 1961 | Tropical Splendour | Northern King – Shaggy Dancer | 31.15 | | | |
| 1962 | Indoor Sport | Champion Prince - Yoblstrap | 30.85 | | | |
| 1963 | Trojan Van | Whirling Turk – Sitting Pretty | 30.85 | | | |
| 1964 | Ashgrove Chief | Golsto –Ashgrove Black | 31.10 | T. Leahy | | |
| 1965 | Bolshoi Prince | The Grand Prince – Bolshoi Artiste | 30.65 | | | |
| 1966 | Bandit | Go Go Rambo – Red Ruthie | 30.95 | | | |
| 1967 | Olivers Leader | Prairie Flash – Olivers Love | 30.20 | T. Wade | | |
| 1968 | Rusheen Rhythm | Pigalle Wonder – Flying Fashion | 30.85 | M. Sullivan | | |
| 1969 | Hilcrest Pride | Clonalvy Pride – Last Pot | 30.65 | Michael Collins | | |
| 1970 | Fire Hunter | Carry On Oregon – Land Hunter | 30.95 | G. Flynn | | |
| 1971 | Getaway Buff | O'Leary – Fannie Caesar | 31.04 | T. O'Connor | | |
| 1972 | Special | Monalee Champion – Coil Valley | 30.85 | J. Foley | | |
| 1973 | Special | Monalee Champion – Coil Valley | 29.75 | J. Foley | | |
| 1974 | Special | Monalee Champion – Coil Valley | 30.95 | J. Foley | | |
| 1975 | Own Kuda | Kilbeg Kuda – Kitty Proud | 31.00 | J. Noonan | | |
| 1976 | Pick Me | Monalee Champion – Hunday Pet | 30.14 | M. Sylver | | |
| 1977 | Pick Me | Monalee Champion – Hunday Pet | 29.96 | M. Sylver | | |
| 1978 | Bowery Music | Westpark Thady – Cavity Block | 30.40 | P. Jones | | |
| 1979 | Kerragh Sambo | Own Pride- Keeragh Flo | 30.20 | Matt O'Donnell | | |
| 1980 | Killerisk Prince | Killerisk Boy – Mermaids Hope | 30.42 | Mrs N. Boyle | | |
| 1981 | Face The Mutt | Mutts Silver – Mill Road Cast | 30.16 | Mrs N. Jackson | | |
| 1982 | Master Bob | Greenview Bob – Bowery Lad | 30.06 | P. Jones | | |
| 1982 | Arabian Knight | Rita's Choice – Silly Sis | 30.68 | J. Allen | | |
| 1984 | Buanait | Offshore Diver – Brook Blonde | 30.42 | | | |
| 1985 | Mars Mist | Inny Mist – I'm Trendy | 30.14 | T. O'Sullivan | | |
| 1986 | Sand Blinder | Sand Man – Tranquility Sea | 30.04 | Mrs J. Kenny | | |
| 1987 | Off You Sail | Sail On II – It's You | 30.48 | Sam Sykes - England | | |
| 1980 | Handball | Game Ball – Killowna Gem | 30.19 | T. Lynch | | |
| 1980 | Handball | Game Ball – Killowna Gem | 30.06 | J. Rouse | | |
| 1990 | Gizmo Pasha | Whisper Wishes – If And When | 29.67 | Linda Mullins - England | | |
| 1991 | Yacht Club | Daleys Gold – Sand Melody | 30.14 | G. J. McKenna | | |
| 1992 | Whos Lots | Balalika – Lyre Daisy | 30.32 | Tony Byrne | | |
| 1993 | Hillview Leader | Leaders Best – Miss Melanie | 30.27 | | | |
| 1994 | Bayview Blaze | Dutch Delight – Ask Helen | 29.72 | | | |
| 1995 | Super Gunboat | Super Mecca – Gunboat Ann | 29.91 | Joe Kenny | | |
| 1996 | Gates To Heaven | Murlens Slippy – Dark Vision | 29.61 | Robinson | | |
| 1997 | Simon Simon | Murlens Abbey – Lovely Lovely | 29.97 | Gary Baggs - England | 6/1 | |
| 1998 | Lynmac Flyer | Droopys Fintan – Lady Cecila | 29.61 | Thomas Lynch | 5/2cf | |
| 1999 | Tarn Bay Flash | Airmount Grand – Highmoor Mist | 29.38 | Dolores Ruth | 6/4jf | |
| 2000 | Autumn Merlin | Westmead Merlin – Miss Piggy | 29.20 | Mick Parker | 5/4 | |
| 2001 | Switchtoplanb | Fat Fella – Call Back Kirby | 29.43 | Shem O'Donnell | 6/1 | |
| 2002 | Bestofthebunch | Toms The Best – Staplers Rhythm | 29.93 | Keeley McGee | 10/1 | |
| 2003 | Frightened Pig | Fly Fright – Miss Piggy | 29.34 | Jason Foster – England | 8/1 | |
| 2004 | Joe Bananas | Larkhill Jo – Woman Power | 29.32 | Nick Colton – England | 3/1 | |
| 2005 | Druids Aghadoe | Top Honcho – Druids Villa | 29.76 | John Brennan | 4/1 | |
| 2006 | Taipan | Kiowa Shawnee So – Rookery Lady | 29.66 | Nick Colton – England | 6/4 | |
| 2007 | Comans Joe | Jamella Prince – Springwell Sue | 29.65 | Jason Foster – England | 4/5f | |
| 2008 | Distant Legend | Hondo Black - Talktothehand | 29.04 | Julie Power | 5/4f | |
| 2009 | Distant Legend | Hondo Black - Talktothehand | 29.10 | Julie Power | 3/1 | |
| 2010 | Junior Mac | Large Mack – Slick Mona | 29.44 | Paul Donovan - England | 7/2 | |
| 2011 | Olivers Twist | Head Bound – Kewell Irony | 29.05 | Lisa Stephenson - England | 2/1 | |
| 2012 | Baran Bally Hi | Tyrur Ted – Druids Judicial | 29.44 | Fraser Black | 7/2 | |
| 2013 | Hypnotic Reason | Hondo Black – Handy Princess | 29.72 | David Stanbridge | 12/1 | |
| 2014 | Razldazlnewstalk | Kinloch Brae – Razldazl Alice | 29.26 | Dolores Ruth | 1/2f | |
| 2015 | Comeout Russell | Westmead Hawk – Lady Deise | 29.73 | Pat Kiely | 4/5f | |
| 2016 | Brinkleysdominic | Droopys Cain - Droopys Geneva | 29.60 | Pat Buckley | 5/4f | |
| 2017 | Offshore Bound | Head Bound - Inshaarla | 29.07 | Patrick Fitzgerald | 3/1 | |
| 2018 | Lightfoot Prince | Candlelight King - Droopys Knox | 28.88 | Pat Kiely | 2/1 | |
| 2019 | Lightfoot Kante | Candlelight King - Puma Girl | 29.01 | Pat Kiely | 1/1f | |
| 2020 | Razldazl Annie | Razldazl Billy - Razldazl Marilyn | 29.37 | Neilus O'Connell | No SP+ | |

+ No SP due to COVID-19 pandemic restrictions

== Venues and distances ==
- Shelbourne Park (525yH 1928)
- Harold's Cross (525yH 1929–30, 1932, 1939, 1941)
- Shelbourne Park (525yH 1933–1938)
- Cork (525yH 1940)
- Kilkenny (525yH 1959–1961)
- Thurles (525yH 1962–1984)
- Shelbourne (525yH 1985–2000)
- Harold's Cross (525yH 2001–2016)
- Curraheen Park (525yH 2017–2020)

== Sponsors ==
- 2003-2006 (Baggot Racing)
- 2008-2010 (Vetsearch Recharge)
- 2012-2012 (SalacresRacingteam.com)
- 2013-2014 (Centra)
- 2017-2020 (Greyhound & Petworld Luxury Transport)
