= 1930 English Greyhound Derby =

Greyhound competition

- Mick The Miller
- Location: White City Stadium
- Start date: 7 June
- End date: 28 June
- Total prize money: £1,480 (winner)

The 1930 Greyhound Derby took place during June with the final being held on 28 June 1930 at White City Stadium. The winner Mick the Miller received a first prize of £1,480.

== Final result ==
At White City (over 525 yards):

Position	Name of Greyhound	Breeding	Trap	SP	Time	Trainer
1st	Mick the Miller	Glorious Event - Na Boc Lei	1	4-9f	30.24	Sidney Orton (Wimbledon)
2nd	Bradshaw Fold	Newville Captain - December Girl	3	100-8	30.48	Stan Biss (West Ham)
3rd	Mick McGee	Guiding Hand - Kashmir Rose	2	100-8	30.64	Jimmy Lowther (Wimbledon)
4th	Dresden	Dago - Beaded Jean	5	100-6	30.66	Eddie Wright (Belle Vue)
5th	So Green	Running Rein - Salsette	6	100-6	30.82	Jim Syder Sr. (Wembley)
6th	Jack Bob	Orkit - Tottie Longsocks	4	8-1	30.98	Bill Fear (White City - London)

=== Distances ===
3, 3¼, head, 2, 2 (lengths) The distances between the greyhounds are in finishing order and shown in lengths. From 1927-1950 one length was equal to 0.06 of one second but race times are shown as 0.08 as per modern day calculations.

== Competition summary ==
The first round got underway on Saturday 7 June and Mick the Miller won his first round at odds of 100-8 on, defeating the field in his heat by 15 lengths in a time of 30.14. The Manchester hope O'Brazil claimed victory, as did another greyhound called Deemster who won a heat in a faster time than Mick the Miller (29.90). Mick the Miller's brother Macoma also won a heat.

During the second round Mick the Miller claimed victory by one and a half lengths from the 1929 Irish Greyhound Derby winner Jack Bob in 30.59. Deemster, although strong favourite for his second round heat, broke a hock and his anticipated challenge to Mick the Miller was over. Macoma also failed to progress any further.

Jack Bob claimed his semi-final and Mick the Miller won his, despite a challenge throughout from Dresden and the 1928 unofficial Irish Greyhound Derby champion Tipperary Hills. The third semi-final was won by Mick McGee.

Mick the Miller was made the 9/4 'on' favourite in the final despite a line-up that included Jack Bob and the leading bitch in Britain at the time called Bradshaw Fold, who held the world record for 550 and 700 yards. Also featuring was So Green, the Puppy Derby and Trafalgar Cup champion. An attendance in excess of 50,000 witnessed the final and included Alfonso XIII, who presented the trophy.

Mick the Miller with the advantage of the red jacket (trap one), led early and won easily by three lengths. By achieving a second Derby win, Mick the Miller became known as 'England's most famous greyhound' and the 'Worlds Wonder Dog'. He remains one of the most significant greyhounds to have ever raced.

== See also ==
1930 UK & Ireland Greyhound Racing Year
