= 1942 UK & Ireland Greyhound Racing Year =

The 1942 UK & Ireland Greyhound Racing Year was the 17th year of greyhound racing in the United Kingdom and the 16th year of greyhound racing in Ireland.

== Summary ==
The year continued to be dominated by the effect of World War II. The only major races that had not been suspended were the Irish Greyhound Derby and Scottish Greyhound Derby. Many race meetings held throughout the country helped with the war effort with money collections made frequently for various funds. The crowds remained healthy and the racing provided a welcome distraction from the war.

The distraction was so significant that the annual totalisator turnover set another new record, reaching £49,989,183, government tax and track deduction remained at 6% each respectively. An example of the sports popularity was highlighted at the House of Commons when an issue was addressed. The issue concerned was when upwards of 500 personnel at an aircraft factory left without permission to attend an afternoon greyhound meeting.

== Ballynennan Moon ==
Ballynennan Moon returned after a winter rest and won the Walthamstow Stakes and Wimbledon Spring Cup. In his next 48 races, he was to win on forty occasions and finish second seven times. After finishing first, fourteen times in succession, he seemed certain to beat Mick the Miller's 19 straight wins but, in the fifteenth race, he was beaten a neck by Laughing Lackey. He then went on to record another eight successive wins during a five-month period and became a household name. He won the Wimbledon Spring Cup, the 1,000 Guineas at Park Royal Stadium, the Wembley Summer Cup, the Eclipse at Coventry, the Stewards Cup at Walthamstow Stadium and at the end of the year the International at Wimbledon Stadium at odds of 1/5f.

== Competitions ==
The fawn dog Ballycurreen Soldier won the Scottish Derby for the second time, the veteran racer was running in his fourth consecutive final.

== News ==
Stan Martin took over the Joe Harmon kennel range, following the death of Harmon the previous September. The range included the greyhound Lights O'London. A memorial race would be initiated in Harmon's honour and the race would aptly be won by the best greyhound in training, Ballynennan Moon. Alfred Critchley became the Chairman of the Greyhound Racing Association, in place of the late Edward Loch, 2nd Baron Loch.

== Ireland ==
The Irish Derby moved back to a more traditional slot at the end of May and was held at Cork Greyhound Stadium. It was only the second time the classic was run outside Dublin. Cork had won the rights to host due to the unfortunate circumstances that had stopped them from holding the event the year before (Foot-and-mouth disease). The first prize was only £175, the lowest on record but the track experienced record crowds. John Crowley a local pub owner in Cork trained Uacterlainn Riac to success for his brother Jerry who owned the dog. Uacterlainn Riac (meaning Creamery Brindle) attempted hurdles after the Derby but failed to take to them and plans for a Grand National double were scrapped.

== Roll of honour ==
Major Winners
Award	Name of Winner
1942 English Greyhound Derby	Suspended
1942 Irish Greyhound Derby	Uacterlainn Riac
1942 Scottish Greyhound Derby	Ballycurren Soldier
1942 Welsh Greyhound Derby	Suspended

Scottish Greyhound Derby, Carntyne (18 Jul, 525y)
Pos	Name of Greyhound	Trainer	SP	Time (sec)	Trap
1st	Ballycurreen Soldier	Michael Conroy	1/1f	29.94	3
2nd	Jamboree Reveller	Harringay	9/4	29.98	1
3rd	Joint Refusal	Austin Hiscock	6/1	30.02	6
4th	Train		9/2	30.06	4
5th	Light Bone	C Lee	12/1	30.10	5
6th	Brave Captain	Newcastle	50/1	30.38	2

== Totalisator Returns ==
Extended content

The totalisator returns declared to the licensing authorities for the year 1942 are listed below. Tracks that did not have a totalisator in operation are not listed.

Stadium	Turnover £
London (White City)	4,585,310
London (Harringay)	2,557,417
London (Wembley)	2,289,400
4 Glasgow Stadia combined (Albion, Carntyne, Shawfield, White City)	2,182,311
London (Walthamstow)	2,018,317
London (Wimbledon)	1,713,542
London (Clapton)	1,603,789
Manchester (Belle Vue)	1,290,238
London (Stamford Bridge)	1,220,680
London (Catford)	1,181,455
London (Wandsworth)	1,171,904
London (New Cross)	1,017,753
3 Birmingham stadia combined (Hall Green, Kings Heath, Perry Barr)	962,113
Sheffield (Owlerton)	852,899
London (Park Royal)	840,206
Bristol (Eastville)	818,054
Bradford (Greenfield)	798,008
London (West Ham)	780,577
London (Hackney)	741,855
London (Hendon)	717,011
Wolverhampton (Monmore)	714,606
Edinburgh (Powderhall)	681,446
Sheffield (Darnall)	602,082
Coventry (Lythalls Lane)	590,990
Newcastle (Brough Park)	586,086
Romford	553,110
Crayford & Bexleyheath	552,625
Liverpool (White City)	542,340

Stadium	Turnover £
Liverpool (Stanley)	537,478
Liverpool (Seaforth)	506,371
Brighton & Hove	506,213
Manchester (White City)	502,040
London (Charlton)	495,073
Newcastle (Gosforth)	457,364
Manchester (Salford)	439,878
Gateshead	439,436
Newcastle (White City)	388,045
Gloucester & Cheltenham	384,311
Ashington (Co Durham)	379,901
Leeds (Elland Road)	364,109
South Shields	340,121
Reading (Oxford Road)	338,726
Slough	336,212
Portsmouth	302,335
London (Dagenham)	273,327
Stoke-on-Trent (Hanley)	272,613
Liverpool (Breck Park)	270,732
Bradford (City)	267,238
Southampton	264,684
Stanley (Co Durham)	260,930
Sunderland	254,042
Hull (Old Craven Park)	250,432
Middlesbrough	247,529
Oxford	236,772
Long Eaton	231,264
West Hartlepool	226,491
Sheffield (Hyde Park)	220,371
Norwich (Boundary Park)	208,588
Newport	197,435

Stadium	Turnover £
Edinburgh (Stenhouse)	175,739
Houghton-le-Spring	174,983
Ipswich	142,438
Luton	131,693
Aberdeen	114,942
Willenhall	111,610
Norwich (City)	109,804
Falkirk (Brockville Park)	100,116
Wigan (Poolstock)	93,115
Easington (Co Durham)	91,360
London (Stratford)	87,450
Warrington	76,224
Coundon (Co Durham)	73,643
London (Southall)	49,307
Glasgow (Mount Vernon)	45,981
Doncaster (Spotbrough)	45,320
Wallyford (East Lothian)	43,391
Wishaw (North Lanarks)	42,823
Kingskerswell (Devon)	27,050
Durham City	25,902
Leeds (Parkside)	24,132
Rotherham	23,112
Thornton (Fife)	19,437
Castleford (Whitwood)	15,466
Irvine (Caledonian)	12,576
Worksop	8,257
Stockport (Hazel Grove)	7,422
Ayr (Tams Brig)	6,872
Wombwell (South Yorks)	3,373
Aldershot	1,244

Summary

Area	Turnover
London	£ 24,450,103
Rest of England	£ 21,516,547
Wales	£ 372,779
Scotland	£ 3,449,749
Total	£ 49,989,183
