= 1943 UK & Ireland Greyhound Racing Year =

The 1943 UK & Ireland Greyhound Racing Year was the 18th year of greyhound racing in the United Kingdom and the 17th year of greyhound racing in Ireland.

== Roll of honour ==
Major Winners
Award	Name of Winner
1943 English Greyhound Derby	Suspended
1943 Irish Greyhound Derby	Famous Knight
1943 Scottish Greyhound Derby	Bilting Hawk
1943 Welsh Greyhound Derby	Suspended

== Summary ==
War time attendances remained strong but there were no known new tracks opened. The only major competitions to take place were again the Scottish Greyhound Derby and Irish Greyhound Derby.

The phenomenon that was a continual growth of attendances and annual totalisator turnover was observed once again, attendances paid £60,382,219 in bets on the totalisator alone. An astonishing figure in 1943, especially taking into account the war.

== Ballynennan Moon ==
Ballynennan Moon continued to be the outstanding performer of the year, he continued where he had left of in 1942 and raced in eighty consecutive weeks of racing. He won the Joe Harmon Memorial Stakes, the Charlton Spring Cup and the Metropolitan Cup.

== Competitions ==
Bilting Hawk won the Scottish Derby and a new puppy called Ballyhennessy Seal, whelped in April 1942, by Lone Seal out of Canadian Glory, arrived at Catford after his two owners had each paid £50 for the puppy. Within two weeks of his arrival he won the 18th Rochester Stakes, his first race in England. Next he was aimed for the Puppy Derby at Wimbledon Stadium where he won his heat by fourteen lengths in 28.88sec, one of the fastest times ever recorded at the track, and was made even-money favourite to win the event outright. He was unlucky to lose the final by a short head to Allardstown Playboy.

Towards the end of the year, the then Wimbledon racing manager, Con Stevens, introduced a special invitation race for puppy champions. The invitees included Allardstown Playboy; Dark Tiger, the Trafalgar Cup; Erlegh Hero, winner of the British Produce Stakes, Model Dasher, the Midland Puppy Derby winner, Fawn Cherry, winner of the Irish Puppy Derby and Ballyhennessy Seal. The latter won the invitation race leading all the way, to win by one and a half lengths in a time of 28.99sec. Blackwater Cutlet won the London Cup at Clapton by twelve lengths from Ballykildare, just one week after they had dead heated in the Stewards Cup at Walthamstow.

The Golden Crest prize money was reduced due to wartime cutbacks.

== News ==
Margaret Hyland became one of the few women trainers to hold a licence joined Rochester Stadium.

== Ireland ==
The Irish Derby would never be run outside of Dublin again which upset the owners of the Irish provincial tracks. The Irish Coursing Club made the decision based on the fact that the capital city offered better facilities and higher prize money. Famous Knight, a red fawn dog started odds on favourite throughout the competition and justified the odds by remaining unbeaten and claiming the final.

== Principal races ==
Scottish Greyhound Derby, Carntyne (17 Jul, 525y £250)
Pos	Name of Greyhound	Trainer	SP	Time (sec)	Trap
1st	Bilting Hawk	Cecil Askey	9/4	29.25	6
2nd	Merry Two Star	Private	8/1	29.41	5
3rd	Derry's Son	Sidney Orton	6/4f	29.43	1
4th	Wavecrest III	M Greenshields	6/1	29.45	3
5th	Monarch of the Glen	Stan Biss	7/2	29.93	4
N/R	Dee Mellow	Wimbledon			

== Totalisator Returns ==
Extended content

The totalisator returns declared to the licensing authorities for the year 1943 are listed below. Tracks that did not have a totalisator in operation are not listed.

Stadium	Turnover £
London (White City)	5,579,036
London (Harringay)	3,263,328
London (Wembley)	3,224,759
4 Glasgow Stadia combined (Albion, Carntyne, Shawfield, White City)	2,509,065
London (Walthamstow)	2,406,489
London (Wimbledon)	2,109,446
London (Clapton)	1,785,125
Birmingham (Perry Barr, old)	1,763,211
London (Catford)	1,395,772
Manchester (Belle Vue)	1,334,563
London (New Cross)	1,241,682
London (Wandsworth)	1,230,310
London (West Ham)	1,098,213
London (Stamford Bridge)	980,738
Sheffield (Owlerton)	979,356
Birmingham (Hall Green)	978,387
Bradford (Greenfield)	954,087
Bristol (Eastville)	945,546
Sheffield (Darnall)	843,407
Wolverhampton (Monmore)	814,961
London (Hendon)	809,462
Edinburgh (Powderhall)	806,344
Coventry (Lythalls Lane)	789,659
Liverpool (White City)	751,040
London (Park Royal)	742,552
Manchester (Salford)	711,219
Leicester (Blackbird Rd)	710,056
London (Hackney)	700,983
Newcastle (Brough Park)	689,560
Brighton & Hove	683,717
Romford	670,631

Stadium	Turnover £
Crayford & Bexleyheath	645,496
Liverpool (Stanley)	597,686
Birmingham (Kings Heath)	564,822
Liverpool (Seaforth)	518,112
Newcastle (Gosforth)	506,731
London (Charlton)	502,270
Gateshead	467,509
Leeds (Elland Road)	463,627
Gloucester & Cheltenham	437,608
Manchester (White City)	436,067
Southampton	432,551
Derby	427,727
South Shields	396,226
Slough	395,908
Newcastle (White City)	395,024
Portsmouth	368,554
Cardiff (Arms Park)	361,058
Hull (Old Craven Park)	353,782
Bradford (City)	351,042
Sunderland	344,321
Reading (Oxford Road)	342,883
Norwich (Boundary Park)	339,327
Stoke-on-Trent (Hanley)	331,100
Stanley (Co Durham)	326,018
Preston	319,655
Rochester & Chatham	308,242
West Hartlepool	287,360
Nottingham (White City)	275,675
Oxford	275,675
Middlesbrough	265,178
Bristol (Knowle)	255,961
Sheffield (Hyde Park)	251,393

Stadium	Turnover £
Stoke-on-Trent (Cobridge)	238,161
Newport	213,380
Houghton-le-Spring	210,277
Ipswich	208,383
Rochdale	178,818
London (Dagenham)	160,010
Long Eaton	156,486
Aberdeen	151,731
Luton	144,423
Norwich (City)	133,155
Edinburgh (Stenhouse)	115,728
Easington (Co Durham)	112,293
Wigan (Poolstock)	102,492
Coundon (Co Durham)	90,921
Warrington	84,309
London (Southall)	81,696
London (Stratford)	81,334
Doncaster (Spotbrough)	55,690
Wishaw (North Lanarks)	52,718
Wallyford (East Lothian)	52,462
Glasgow (Mount Vernon)	32,506
Leeds (Parkside)	32,391
Rotherham	30,927
Kingskerswell (Devon)	30,593
Motherwell (Clyde Valley)	29,210
Durham City	26,825
Aldershot	19,427
Castleford (Whitwood)	13,716
Worksop	10,030
Stockport (Hazel Grove)	9,374
Wombwell (South Yorks)	4,616

Summary

Area	Turnover
London	£ 28,709,332
Rest of England	£ 26,607,012
Wales	£ 574,438
Scotland	£ 3,778,018
Total	£ 59,668,800
