= Jim Syder Sr. =

British greyhound racing professional trainer

Personal information
- Born: 14 December 1880 Fakenham, Norfolk, England
- Died: 21 April 1945 (aged 64) London, England
- Occupation: Greyhound trainer

Sport
- Sport: Greyhound racing

Achievements and titles
- National finals: Derby wins: English Derby (1937); Classic/Feature wins: St Leger (1937); Cesarewitch (1935); Puppy Derby (1929, 1932); Trafalgar Cup (1929, 1932, 1936)

James "Jim" Platten Syder (14 December 1880 – 21 April 1945) was an English greyhound trainer. He achieved the highest training accolade when winning the English Greyhound Derby.

== Early life ==
Born in Fakenham, Norfolk during 1880, he was the son of a cattle salesman. He moved to Edmonton, London as a young man and also became a cattle salesman.

== Career ==
In 1927 he made the decision to change career, entering into the fledgling industry of greyhound racing. He was one of the first greyhound trainers to gain employment at Wembley Stadium following the introduction of the Wembley greyhound racing

He trained the runner-up in the 1928 Cesarewitch. One year later he won the inaugural 1929 Puppy Derby and inaugural 1929 Trafalgar Cup, with a puppy called So Green. So Green went on to reach the 1930 English Greyhound Derby final losing out to Mick the Miller.

His son Jim Syder Jr. started working for him in 1930, as a kennel hand and the father and son team reached another Derby final with Golden Hammer in the 1931 English Greyhound Derby.

They resided at Horsenden Farm (now a tourist attraction) in Greenford and later London Road, in St Albans but trained out of the Wembley Kennels. The first classic success arrived in 1935 when Grand Flight II won the Cesarewitch. Grand Flight II later reached the 1936 English Greyhound Derby final.

His greatest achievement was in 1937 when Wattle Bark won the 1937 English Greyhound Derby, Syder trained three of the six finalists. Also in 1937 he won the St Leger with Grosvenor Bob.

Wattle Bark reached the 1938 English Greyhound Derby final before World War II intervened. In 1939, Syder was living in St Albans. Before racing returned to Wembley on a regular basis, Syder died during April 1945 and the Wembley licence passed to his son.
