= White City Stadium, Cardiff =

Former greyhound track in Cardiff, Wales

White City Stadium
- Sloper Road Stadium
- Welsh White City Stadium or Ninian Stadium
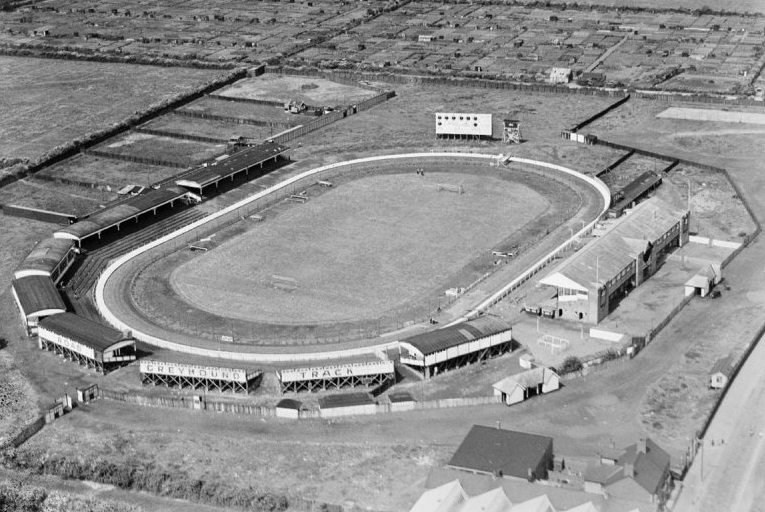
- Location: Sloper Road, Cardiff, Wales
- Coordinates: 51°28′03″N 3°11′43″W
- Opened: 1928
- Closed: 1937

The White City Stadium, officially known as the Sloper Road Stadium, and colloquially known as Welsh White City Stadium or Ninian Stadium, was a former greyhound racing and motorcycle speedway stadium, on Sloper Road in the Grangetown area of Cardiff.

== History ==
The Greyhound Racing Association (GRA) purchased open land on Sloper Road opposite the Ninian Park Primary School and Sevenoaks Park, an area covered today by housing and retail buildings as the site for the stadium. The stadium name White City originated because the GRA surrounded the arena with white concrete walls and raised terracing capable of holding over 40,000 people and the name had already caught on following the success of their sister track White City in London. The GRA (South Wales) erected six kennel blocks under the grandstand capable of housing 180 dogs.

The White City Stadium, also known as Sloper Road or the Welsh White City opened on Easter Saturday 1928 but persistent rain fell resulting in only 9,000 spectators turning up. The first hurdle event was declared a no-race because the dogs fought each other and none of them completed the 470 yard trip. Fine weather returned on the Easter Monday and 25,000 people paid either 2s 4d or 5/-to get into the stadium.

The track held the prestigious Welsh Greyhound Derby which eventually became a classic race in 1971 and formed part of the triple crown along with the English Greyhound Derby and Scottish Greyhound Derby.

Mick the Miller appeared at the track in the early years; it was in August 1929 that he lost to local favourite Back Isle in a match race before gaining revenge back in London one week later. Back Isle won the Welsh Derby that year but Mick the Miller arrived one year later for a tilt at the competition. On 29 July 1930 he won his first round and then produced two national records in the semi-finals and final.

The GRA realised that they were fighting a losing battle to compete with the rival Cardiff Arms Park that was in a better location in the city and was gaining larger attendances so they decided to put the stadium up for sale. The stadium was sold to the Guest, Keen and Nettlefolds steel works in 1937.

== Competitions ==
- Welsh Greyhound Derby

== Track records ==
Distance yards	Greyhound	Time	Date	Notes
525	Mick the Miller	29.60	2 August 1930	National record
525	Mick the Miller	29.55	9 August 1930	National record
