= 1941 UK & Ireland Greyhound Racing Year =

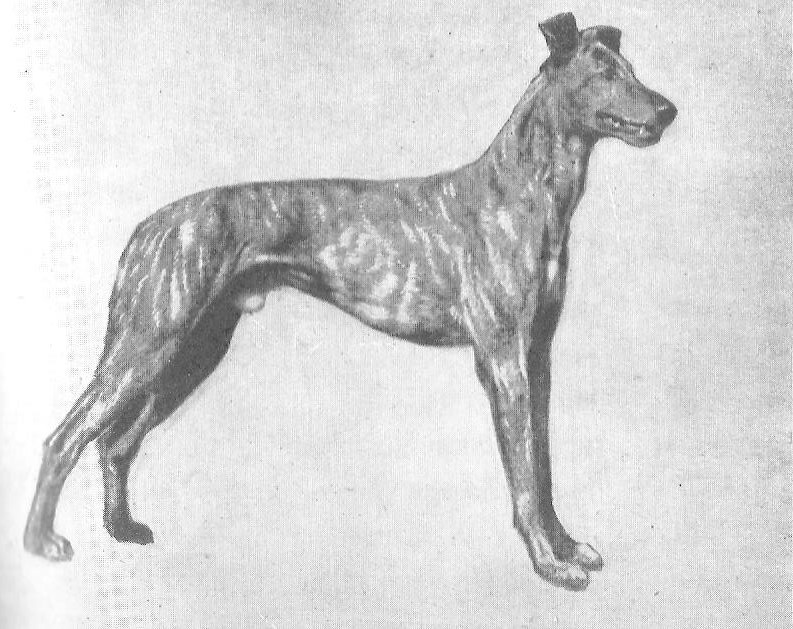
- Ballynennan Moon, the leading greyhound during the war

The 1941 UK & Ireland Greyhound Racing Year was the 16th year of greyhound racing in the United Kingdom and the 15th year of greyhound racing in Ireland.

== Summary ==
The year was dominated by the effects of World War II. The remaining classic races that had not been suspended in 1940 were duly suspended in 1941, with the exception of the Irish Greyhound Derby and Scottish Greyhound Derby.

Racing did continue at many venues but was restricted to afternoons during the winter, this is because of the blackout regulations and during the summer the meetings were held in the early part of the evening. Matinee meetings would also take place on weekends at some tracks. Staffing the racing worsened as many of the stadium and kennel staff were called up to serve.

Remarkably, despite restrictions on racing then annual totalisator turnover set a new record, reaching £42,027,642 and with a tax of 6% was a significant income for the government.

on 22 September, leading trainer Joe Harmon died, leaving a huge gap to fill in the trainers ranks.

== Competitions ==
Shortly before his death, trainer Joe Harmon continued his successful run of big race wins by training Lights O'London, who won the Scottish Derby. Ballycurreen Soldier reached his third consecutive Scottish Derby final under the training of a third different trainer. The event was completed in one evening, with heats at 7:35 pm and 7:55 pm and the final later at 9:45 pm. The principal London races remaining on the open race calendar were The Cambridgeshire, Wimbledon Spring Cup, Wimbledon Gold Cup, Wembley Gold Cup and Two Year Old Produce Stakes, also at Wimbledon.

Ballynennan Moon, now with Sidney Orton and owned by mrs Cearns, won the Wembley Summer Cup in August, quickly followed by the Berkeley Cup and was beginning to come to prominence as the nation's leading greyhound. However, with no English Greyhound Derby taking place, this brindle dog would never have the opportunity to claim the sport's biggest prize.

== Ireland ==
Iris racing suffered from the dreaded Foot-and-mouth disease; traveling almost ceased and the Irish tracks came to a standstill in many areas. The ban was finally lifted at the end of the summer and hectic plans were drawn up to save the Irish Derby before the year ended. This resulted in a late October slot for the competition and would be run at Shelbourne Park because Cork Greyhound Stadium had ruled themselves out from being able to stage the race. Harold's Cross Stadium also managed to stage the Grand National at late notice, which went down well with the Irish Coursing Club, who had noted that both Dublin tracks had come to the rescue. The Grand National title went to The Gunner. The Irish Greyhound Derby winner Brave Damsel, owned by John Byrne and The Gunner, were both sold to England. The latter was bought by a syndicate in Oxford for the sum of £400 and would become a crowd favourite at the recently built Oxford Stadium because of his hurdling ability.

== Roll of honour ==
Major Winners
Award	Name of Winner
1941 English Greyhound Derby	Suspended
1941 Irish Greyhound Derby	Brave Damsel
1941 Scottish Greyhound Derby	Lights O'London
1941 Welsh Greyhound Derby	Suspended

Scottish Greyhound Derby, Carntyne (18 Jul, 525y, £300)
Pos	Name of Greyhound	Trainer	SP	Time (sec)	Trap
1st	Lights O'London	Joe Harmon	1/1f	29.75	3
2nd	Shorn	Joe Harmon	5/4	29.99	1
3rd	Ballycurreen Soldier	J Petrie	5/1	30.39	4
4th	Keel Creamery	Joe Harmon	10/1	30.43	5
5th	Joint Refusal	Austin Hiscock	33/1	30.47	2
6th	Mr Gaughan	Private trainer	33/1	30.63	6

== Tracks opened ==
Date	Stadium/Track	Location	Ref
22 March	Doncaster Greyhound Stadium	Doncaster	

== Totalisator Returns ==
Extended content

The totalisator returns declared to the licensing authorities for the year 1941 are listed below. Tracks that did not have a totalisator in operation are not listed.

Stadium	Turnover £
London (White City)	3,727,310
London (Harringay)	2,549,889
London (Wembley)	2,013,914
London (Wimbledon)	1,927,815
London (Stamford Bridge)	1,819,708
4 Glasgow Stadia combined (Albion, Carntyne, Shawfield, White City)	1,746,759
London (Walthamstow)	1,649,474
London (Clapton)	1,376,230
London (West Ham)	1,167,673
Manchester (Belle Vue)	1,116,673
London (Wandsworth)	1,046,055
London (Park Royal)	1,034,674
London (Catford)	875,598
3 Birmingham stadia combined (Hall Green, Kings Heath, Perry Barr)	767,734
London (New Cross)	761,660
Manchester (White City)	652,605
London (Hackney)	643,244
Bradford (Greenfield)	622,176
London (Hendon)	616,796
Sheffield (Owlerton)	609,164
Wolverhampton (Monmore)	594,100
Newcastle (Brough Park)	593,115
Manchester (Salford)	586,084
London (Charlton)	567,159
Bristol (Eastville)	564,242
Gateshead	499,365
Newcastle (Gosforth)	490,265
Edinburgh (Powderhall)	488,261

Stadium	Turnover £
Romford	487,433
Sheffield (Darnall)	454,193
London (Dagenham)	444,138
Brighton & Hove	399,301
Newcastle (White City)	393,959
Gloucester & Cheltenham	361,439
Liverpool (Seaforth)	359,711
Willenhall	357,694
Cardiff (Arms Park)	353,791
Liverpool (Stanley)	351,956
Ashington (Co Durham)	337,041
Preston	317,042
Reading (Oxford Road)	316,163
Nottingham (White City)	315,209
Slough	315,009
Liverpool (White City)	296,357
Leeds (Elland Road)	284,692
Derby	251,589
Rochester & Chatham	222,732
Portsmouth	220,126
South Shields	216,035
Bradford (City)	206,924
Newport	201,841
Middlesbrough	196,683
Stanley (Co Durham)	196,635
Bristol (Knowle)	187,936
Sheffield (Hyde Park)	185,766
Long Eaton	171,608
Norwich (Boundary Park)	158,525
Liverpool (Breck Park)	156,634
West Hartlepool	152,306

Stadium	Turnover £
Houghton-le-Spring	134,525
Southampton	114,955
Luton	108,291
Ipswich	108,266
Hull (Old Craven Park)	105,827
London (Stratford)	99,662
Warrington	78,797
Norwich (City)	77,868
Falkirk (Brockville Park)	76,084
Easington (Co Durham)	75,759
Edinburgh (Stenhouse)	70,598
Aberdeen	67,150
Wigan (Poolstock)	66,024
Coundon (Co Durham)	53,100
Doncaster (Spotbrough)	41,330
London (Southall)	23,443
Kingskerswell (Devon)	21,912
Aldershot	19,550
Leeds (Parkside)	16,977
Durham City	16,371
Rotherham	16,083
Castleford (Whitwood)	15,680
Irvine (Caledonian)	8,852
Stockport (Hazel Grove)	8,285
Wombwell (South Yorks)	8,248
Worksop	7,790
