= Mick the Miller =

Racing greyhound (1926–1939)

- Sire: Glorious Event
- Dam: Na Boc Lei
- Sex: Dog
- Whelped: 29 June 1926
- Died: 6 May 1939 (aged 12)
- Color: Brindle
- Breeder: B Murphy (alias of Father Martin Brophy)
- Owner: Father Martin Brophy & Kempton family
- Trainer: Mick Horan & Sidney Orton

Record
- 2 × winner of the English Greyhound Derby

Mick the Miller (29 June 1926 – 6 May 1939) was a male brindle greyhound. He is celebrated as the first great racing greyhound to compete in England (although he was born in Ireland). Despite a short three-year racing career, his achievements were highly publicised around the world and by the end of his career he had become an icon in the sport. His achievements include winning nineteen races in a row, including the English Greyhound Derby on two successive occasions. He suffered an injury at Wimbledon Stadium whilst racing which broke the streak in 1931, and once recovered was beaten in the attempt to win a third Derby title. He went on to appear in films, and is still considered one of the greatest sporting heroes in the UK.

== Early life ==
Mick, a male brindle Greyhound, was born in Killeigh, County Offaly, Ireland before the introduction of Greyhound track racing in Ireland, and before the sport became popular in Britain. The smallest of a litter of ten puppies, his father was a direct descendant of Master McGrath, a famous Irish Greyhound who won the Waterloo Cup on three occasions. Originally expected to be used for hare coursing, a deal was discussed with dog owner Moses Rebenschied to take Mick to America to compete in the Greyhound racing circuit. However, before the deal could go through a tornado struck St. Louis, Missouri, killing 27 of Rebenschied's Greyhounds when the roof was blown off their kennel, and a further four dogs died when a van driven by his son was overturned by the storm. In a letter from Rebenschied calling off the deal he stated his reason, "I repeat, the hand of God is warning me against greyhounds."

A Catholic priest, Father Martin Brophy, brought Mick to race in England, although nearly sold the dog as a puppy to another priest, Father Maurice Browne. Although the Catholic Church in Ireland had no issues with Greyhound racing, the Catholic Church in Great Britain at the time was against it, having published a pamphlet entitled Dog Racing which called it a "threat to Sunday dinners", and described gambling that "the distribution of losses and dividends had an anti-social character because the poorest, the most unhappy, the physically and emotionally handicapped, are made to pay for the professionals and semi-professionals who get hold of intimate knowledge."

== Racing career ==
=== 1928 ===
He made his debut at Shelbourne Park on 18 April 1928 winning the Punchestown Stakes. He raced five times during 1928, winning four times and equalled the 500 metres world record after recording 28.80 at Shelbourne. The day after competing in the Abercorn Cup final he suffered a serious illness and was diagnosed with distemper. He nearly died but was nursed back to health by the Shelbourne Park veterinary surgeon Arthur 'Doc' Callanan.

=== 1929 ===
He reached the Easter Cup final at Shelbourne and won the Spring Cup final at Harold's Cross Stadium and National Cup final at Shelbourne before travelling to England for the first time. In a solo trial prior to the 1929 English Greyhound Derby on 25 July, Mick broke the track record, reducing his odds from an initial 25–1 to becoming the 4–7 favorite to win by the time of the final, despite still being new off the board from Ireland. He was housed at the kennels of Paddy McEllistrim for the duration of the Derby. In the first round, Mick pulled away down the back straight, beating Captured Half by eight lengths and setting a time of 29.82, a new world record over that length. Father Browne sold Mick for £800, plus any prize money that the dog would win on the night, which at the time was more than the cost of buying a house in nearby Shepherd's Bush. By 8:45 pm, when the final took place, some 40,000 spectators were in the ground. The lineup was four dogs; in trap one was Beadsman at 20–1; trap two was Palatinus at 3–1; trap three was Entomb at 9–2, and finally Mick the Miller in trap four, wearing the black jacket. Palatinus made the best start, at the first bend both Mick and Entomb attempted to move inside to the rail, but Beadsman collided with both of them, sending all three dogs sprawling. The no–race klaxon went off, and the race had to be restarted. None of the dogs was allowed to leave the track with until the race was re–run at 9:15 pm, the only comfort given to Mick on a particularly hot summer's evening was a handkerchief soaked in cold water.

The re-run began, with Palatinus again getting away first, however at the first corner, Mick pursued him around the first corner alone. Catching him down the back straight, Mick pulled away around the third bend going on to beat him by three lengths in a time of 29.96. Although Palatinus completed the first run through, his time was one fifth of a second slower than that made by Mick in the second. When villagers in his home town of Killeigh heard of his success, an impromptu bonfire party was held.

On 19 October 1929, Mick won the inaugural International at Wimbledon, defeating Back Isle (Welsh Derby winner) and Cleveralitz (Scottish Derby winner). he finished runner-up in the London Cup final on 26 November. He finished 1929 with a record of 26 wins from 32 races. He joined Wimbledon trainer Sidney Orton in December 1929 at the Burhill kennels in Hersham.

=== 1930 ===
1930 English Derby win

He started 1930 well by finishing runner-up in the Champion Stakes at Wimbledon on 1 January and then won the Spring Cup at Wembley on 22 March. He then won the Derby again in front of 50,000 spectators including King Alfonso XIII of Spain. His victory there was his eleventh in succession. Mick then won the Cesarewitch at West Ham and the Welsh Greyhound Derby at the Sloper Road Stadium, setting the world record again, this time at 29.55 seconds over 525 yards (480 m). His run extended nineteen successive victories before he tore a shoulder muscle in a race at Wimbledon Stadium. During the run, he broke world records on four occasions and newspaper editors stopped using the headline of "Wonder Dog", instead replacing it with simply "Invincible". He finished the year winning 20 times from 23 races.

=== 1931 ===
A comeback was attempted in February 1931, again at Wimbledon, however Mick suffered a torn dewclaw in a trial, setting back his return until March when he won the Spring Cup again at Wembley breaking the track record in the final before he returned to White City with the aim of winning a third Derby.

He suffered shock defeats by Mick's Fancy in the eleventh heat of the 1931 English Greyhound Derby, and again by five lengths in the second round by a new Irish import, a dog called Ryland R who weighed over 80 pounds (36 kg). Mick had still been favourite in that race, but for the first time in some 25 races, he was not odds on. Ryland R and Mick met again in the semi-finals on 20 June, the second time in 48 races that Mick was not the favourite since coming over from Ireland. Coming out the first turn, Mick was fifth, but was bumped so wide that Ryland opened up a fifteen length lead over his at one point. However, Mick sped on, and overtook the other dogs until only Ryland remained. As they crossed the line, Ryland took the victory, but by only half a length. The Evening News stated that "Mick has never run a better race". However, this was the first time that Mick had ever lost three consecutive races, but at least qualified for the final.

The final took place on 27 June 1931, with 70,000 spectators attending to see Mick the Miller take on "The Black Express" Ryland R. The two dogs were both matched as joint favourites for the final at odds of 13–8. The other four dogs in the race were Golden Hammer, Mick's Fancy, Seldom Lad and Brunswick Bill. Just after 9 pm, Ryland is out of the traps ahead of the others once again, with Mick in last position as they go around the first bend. Ryland led all the way until the final turn where Seldom Lad closed on him. The two dogs made contact and swung wide, the race steward spotted that Ryland had turned to snap at Seldom Lad and set off the no–race klaxon. The noise is drowned out by the crowd as Mick the Miller is suddenly coming through the pack. Despite being bumped earlier in the race, he found the inside rail and moved up past the others, beating Golden Hammer by a head at the line. The announcer repeats that it is a no race to the disappointment of the crowd. Ryland R was disqualified for "nosing and impeding" another dog. Phiddy Kempton, Mick's owner at the time, broke down into tears, "Mick has won! My darling Mick has won!" he cried. A re–run was ordered for 9:55 pm, while the crowd began to get unruly. Kempton was refusing to allow Mick to compete in the re–run, adamant he had already run the Derby. The directors of the Greyhound Racing Association were in attendance, and knowing the effect that both the two favourites not running in the final of the Derby would mean for the sport, convinced Kempton to run Mick.

The race was re–run, and the tired Mick was never close to placing. He slipped at the first bend whilst attempting to take the inside. Seldom Lad overtook Golden Hammer and won the race unchallenged, with Mick finishing in fourth place. Mick's time in the voided race was 29.89 seconds, some two and a half lengths faster than Seldom Lad's time in the second. Mick lost a fourth race in a row for the first time ever, and the Derby trophy was awarded to Seldom Lad's owners amid a host of boos from the crowd.

The circumstances of the third derby changed the public perception of Mick. He was no longer simply a racing Greyhound, he had become a public icon and became the embodiment of the sport at an international level. The Greyhound Mirror and Gazette proclaimed of Mick, "Greyhound racing is still in its infancy, but already it has produced a popular favourite as idolised as any horse, cinema star, footballer or boxer in history." He was featured in articles around the world including Welt im Bild (Germany), the Herald Sun (Australia) and The American Weekly (USA). Mick continued to race for most of the rest of the year, with his final race being the St Leger Stakes in October at what was then called the Empire Stadium, winning the race whilst watched by 40,000 spectators. This race was later described as the greatest race ever staged at Wembley, which would go on to hold Greyhound racing until 1998 prior to its demolition to make room for the new Wembley Stadium. In qualifying for the final of that race, he beat Seldom Lad on three occasions. His retirement was announced in December 1931.

== Later life ==
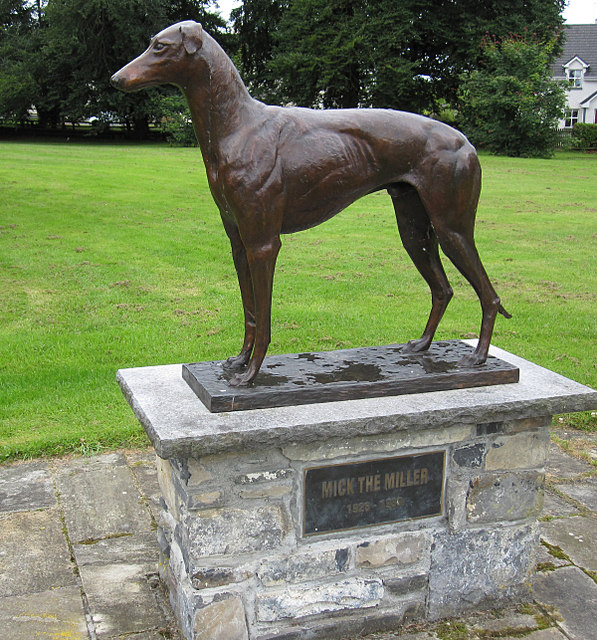
Statue in County Offaly

Mick spent the next two years at stud with Jack Masters at Mill Farm, near Dereham in Norfolk, and was the most expensive dog advertised at stud demanding 50 guineas. He was a special guest at the opening of Catford Stadium on 30 July 1932. He appeared with Flanagan and Allen in the 1934 movie Wild Boy. Although the Evening News predicted that it would be "one of the most popular British films of the year", no box office records were kept and the only known copy is in the possession of the British Film Institute. It was reported as being badly received by critics and ran massively over budget.

Mick died on 6 May 1939, a few weeks short of his thirteenth birthday, having amassed around £20,000 in stud fees, from appearances in films, and in prize money. After his death he was stuffed and given by his last owner, A.H. Kempton, to the Natural History Museum in London; he has since been moved to the Natural History Museum at Tring in Hertfordshire. He stands in cabinet 58 of the household dogs section at the museum in an airtight case filled with an insecticide called Vapona in order to prevent any damage by insects.

== Legacy ==
Mick the Miller is still credited as popularising Greyhound racing in Great Britain after his back to back English Greyhound Derby victories in 1929 and 1930. An enclosure was named after Mick at Wimbledon Stadium. Mick remained the only dog to win two Derby titles until 1973, when Patricias Hope won his second title. Royal Doulton produced a limited edition run of Mick the Miller figurines in the 1990s. A memorial to Mick was built on the village green of his birthplace in Killeigh, County Offaly. The statue was created by Northern Irish artist Liz O'Kane, and was unveiled by the Taoiseach of Ireland, Brian Cowen.

In 2007, journalist Jon Henderson drew up his list of 100 top British sportsmen for his book Best of British: Hendo's Sporting Heroes. Mick the Miller was included in the list as the only Greyhound, with the only other animal being multi–time Grand National winner Red Rum. He is still referred to as the world's most famous Greyhound, having won 51 of the 68 races he was entered into and is the only dog to have won the treble of the Derby, Cesarewitch and St Leger.

== Full race record ==
Mick The Miller ran a total of 81 races of which he won 61: 15 wins from 20 in Ireland and 46 wins from 61 in England.

=== 1928 ===
Date	Race	Yards	Venue	Trap	Pos	Win time	SP	Distance (lengths)	Notes
18 Apr	Puncheston Stakes	500	Shelbourne Park	4	1st	29.35	4-1	2	
25 Apr	Abercorn Cup first round	526	Celtic Park	3	1st	30.80	1-5f	Dis	
7 May	Abercorn Cup semi final	526	Celtic Park	2	1st	30.35	5-2jf	½	
9 May	Spring Show Cup first round	500	Shelbourne Park	3	1st	28.80	1-1f	2	
11 May	Abercorn Cup Final	526	Celtic Park	1	3rd	30.25	5-1	¾	winner - Moorland Rover

=== 1929 ===
Date	Race	Yards	Venue	Trap	Pos	Win time	SP	Distance (lengths)	Notes
25 Mar	Shelbourne Stakes	525	Shelbourne Park	2	1st	30.40	5-4f	3	
1 Apr	Easter Cup first round	525	Shelbourne Park	2	2nd	30.52	5-4f	2	winner - Care Free
8 Apr	Easter Cup semi final	525	Shelbourne Park	5	2nd	30.44	5-1	½	winner - Entomb
15 Apr	Easter Cup final	525	Shelbourne Park	3	2nd	30.71	7-1	½	winner - Odd Blade
23 Apr	Leinster Plate	600	Harolds Cross	4	1st	35.00	6-4f	1 ½	
2 May	Spring Cup first round	525	Harolds Cross	2	1st	30.83	4-5f	4	
10 May	Spring Cup semi final	525	Harolds Cross	2	1st	30.75	4-5f	2	
21 May	Spring Cup final	525	Harolds Cross	6	1st	30.79	5-1	4	£100 prize
7 June	Stayers Cup first round	600	Harolds Cross	3	1st	34.67	4-6f	4	
8 June	National Cup first round	525	Shelbourne Park	6	1st	30.18	1-1f	4	
13 June	Stayers cup semi finals	600	Harolds Cross	4	1st	34.46	1-2f	Dis	
17 June	National cup second round	525	Shelbourne Park	3	1st	30.00	2-5f	6	
18 June	Stayers cup final	600	Harolds Cross	1	2nd	34.42	2-5f	Hd	winner - Ukelele Lad
26 June	National cup semi finals	525	Shelbourne Park	1	1st	30.06	4-6f	4	
6 July	National cup final	525	Shelbourne Park	2	1st	30.01	1-2f	4	£100 prize
16 July	Derby 1st round	525	White City	4	1st	29.82	1-4f	8	525y world & track record
20 July	Derby 2nd round	525	White City	1	1st	30.45	1-4f	8	
23 July	Derby semi final	525	White City	1	1st	29.98	1-4f	3	
25 July	Derby final	525	White City	4	1st+	29.96	4-7f	3	+Re-Run £700 prize
5 Aug	International heat	600	West Ham	3	1st	34.37	1-5f	7	
5 Aug	International final	600	West Ham	5	1st	34.43	1-4f	4	
24 Aug	Match v Back Isle	525	Welsh White City	2	2nd	29.72		2 ½	
31 Aug	Match v Back Isle	550	Wimbledon	4	1st	31.72	4-6f	neck	Track record, £300 prize
19 Oct	International	550	Wimbledon	2	1st	32.38	4-6f	1	£250 prize
14 Nov	Match v Bishops Dream	525	White City	2	1st	29.98	4-11f	½	£1,100 prize
16 Nov	London Cup 1st Rd	525	White City	1	1st	30.66	1-8f	10	
21 Nov	London Cup 2nd Rd	525	White City	1	1st	30.74	2-5f	½	
23 Nov	London Cup semi final	525	White City	3	1st	30.92	4-7f	½	
26 Nov	London Cup final	525	White City	4	2nd	30.69	4-6f	head	winner-Peerless Call
11 Dec	Match v Bishops Dream	500	Harringay	2	1st	29.52	4-5f	½	£700 prize
20 Dec	Champion Stakes 1st Rd	550	Wimbledon	3	1st	33.15	1-8f	neck	
26 Dec	Champion Stakes semi final	550	Wimbledon	3	1st	33.56	4-9f	1 ½	

=== 1930 ===
Date	Race	Yards	Venue	Trap	Pos	Win time	SP	Distance (lengths)	Notes
1 Jan	Champion Stakes final	550	Wimbledon	2	2nd	32.99	8-13f	8	winner - Buckna Boy
19 Feb	Match v Buckna Boy	550	Wimbledon	2	1st	32.40	2-5f	head	
17 Mar	Spring Cup 1st Rd	525	Wembley	3	2nd	31.00	4-7f	1	winner - So Green
19 Mar	Spring Cup semi final	525	Wembley	4	1st	30.56	1-1f	2 ½	
22 Mar	Spring Cup final	525	Wembley	2	1st	30.56	1-1f	shd	£230 prize
31 Mar	Match v So Green	525	Wembley	1	1st	30.08	1-6f	2 ½	
4 Apr	Match v So Green	550	Wimbledon	1	1st	32.93	1-6f	2 ½	
10 Apr	Match v Fairy Again	525	White City	1	1st	29.76	2-5f	7	
9 May	Loafer Trophy	525	Wimbledon	5	1st	32.31	4-11f	1	
17 May	Farndon Cup	525	White City	5	1st	30.19	2-7f	2	
7 June	Derby 1st round	525	White City	1	1st	30.14	8-100f	20	
17 June	Derby 2nd round	525	White City	2	1st	30.59	1-7f	1 ½	
21 June	Derby semi final	525	White City	4	1st	30.13	2-7f	2	
28 June	Derby final	525	White City	1	1st	30.24	4-9f	2	£1,480 prize
30 June	Cesarewitch 1st Rd	600	West Ham	4	1st	34.06	1-10f	13	National record
5 July	Cesarewitch 2nd Rd	600	West Ham	1	1st	34.09	1-8f	5	
9 July	Cesarewitch semi final	600	West Ham	3	1st	34.01	1-10f	7	National record
12 July	Cesarewitch final	600	West Ham	2	1st	34.11	1-7f	3	£1,000 prize
29 July	Welsh Derby 1st Rd	525	Welsh White City	2	1st	29.90	1-5f	12	
2 Aug	Welsh Derby semi final	525	Welsh White City	4	1st	29.60	1-8f	8	National record
9 Aug	Welsh Derby final	525	Welsh White City	2	1st	29.55	1-8f	10	National & track record
20 Aug	Match v Faithful Kitty	550	Wimbledon	2	1st	32.29	1-3f	½	
23 Aug	Laurels 1st Rd	500	Wimbledon	5	6th	29.37	1-6f		finished injured

=== 1931 ===
Date	Race	Yards	Venue	Trap	Pos	Win time	SP	Distance (lengths)	Notes
16 Mar	Spring Cup 1st Rd	525	Wembley	4	1st	30.44	1-2f	4	
18 Mar	Spring Cup semi final	525	Wembley	4	1st	30.34	4-9f	3	
23 Mar	Spring Cup final	525	Wembley	4	1st	30.04	1-3f	2 ½	Track record
16 May	Open Race	525	White City	1	1st	30.51	1-3f	2	
23 May	Open Race	550	West Ham	5	3rd	32.06	1-3f	2 ½	winner - Passing Fair
6 June	Match v Doumergue	525	White City	4	1st	30.10	8-13f	Shd	
13 June	Derby 1st round	525	White City	2	2nd	30.66	2-7f	1 ½	
16 June	Derby 2nd round	525	White City	3	2nd	29.69	7-4	5	
20 June	Derby semi final	525	White City	6	2nd	30.20	2-1	½	
27 June	Derby final	525	White City	6	4th+	30.40	1-1f	6	+Re-Run
4 July	Cesarewitch 1st Rd	600	West Ham	5	1st	34.51	6-4f	head	
11 July	Cesarewitch semi final	600	West Ham	2	3rd	34.72	1-3f	2 ½	
18 July	Cesarewitch final	600	West Ham	3	2nd	34.03	5-2	5	
25 July	Welsh Derby 1st Rd	525	Welsh White City	4	5th	30.72		dis	fell
8 Aug	Match v Maidens Boy	550	Perry Barr	4	1st	32.20	4-6f	6	
15 Aug	Match v Altamatzin	525	Welsh White City	1	2nd	29.69		head	
14 Sep	St Leger 1st Rd	700	Wembley	4	1st	41.40	2-5f	7	
19 Sep	Match v Ross Regatta	525	Perry Barr	2	2nd	30.19		2	
21 Sep	St Leger 2nd Rd	700	Wembley	3	1st	40.85	6-1	head	
26 Sep	St Leger semi final	700	Wembley	1	1st	40.86	7-4	3	
3 Oct	St Leger final	700	Wembley	3	1st	41.31	1-1f	head	£700 prize

== Pedigree ==
Hillcourt
Osprey Hawk
Prairie Hawk
Glorious Event
Dick the Liar
Merriment IV
Royal Leily
Mick the Miller
Lock and Key
Let 'Im Out
Lengsfeld
Na Boc Lei
Coming Tide
Talbotstown III
Bag O Slack

== See also ==
- Scurlogue Champ - another of the "great 3" racing greyhounds
- Ballyregan Bob - displayed alongside Mick the Miller
- List of individual dogs
