= Welsh Greyhound Derby =

Defunct Welsh greyhound racing competition

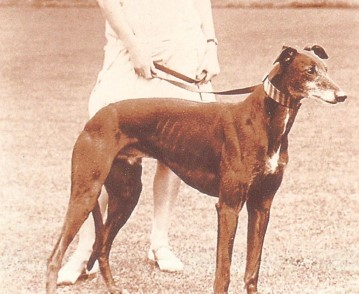
- 1929 Welsh Greyhound Derby winner Back Isle
- Class: Triple Crown
- Location: Cardiff Arms Park
- Inaugurated: 1928
- Final run: 1977

The Welsh Greyhound Derby was a former classic greyhound competition held in Wales.

== History ==
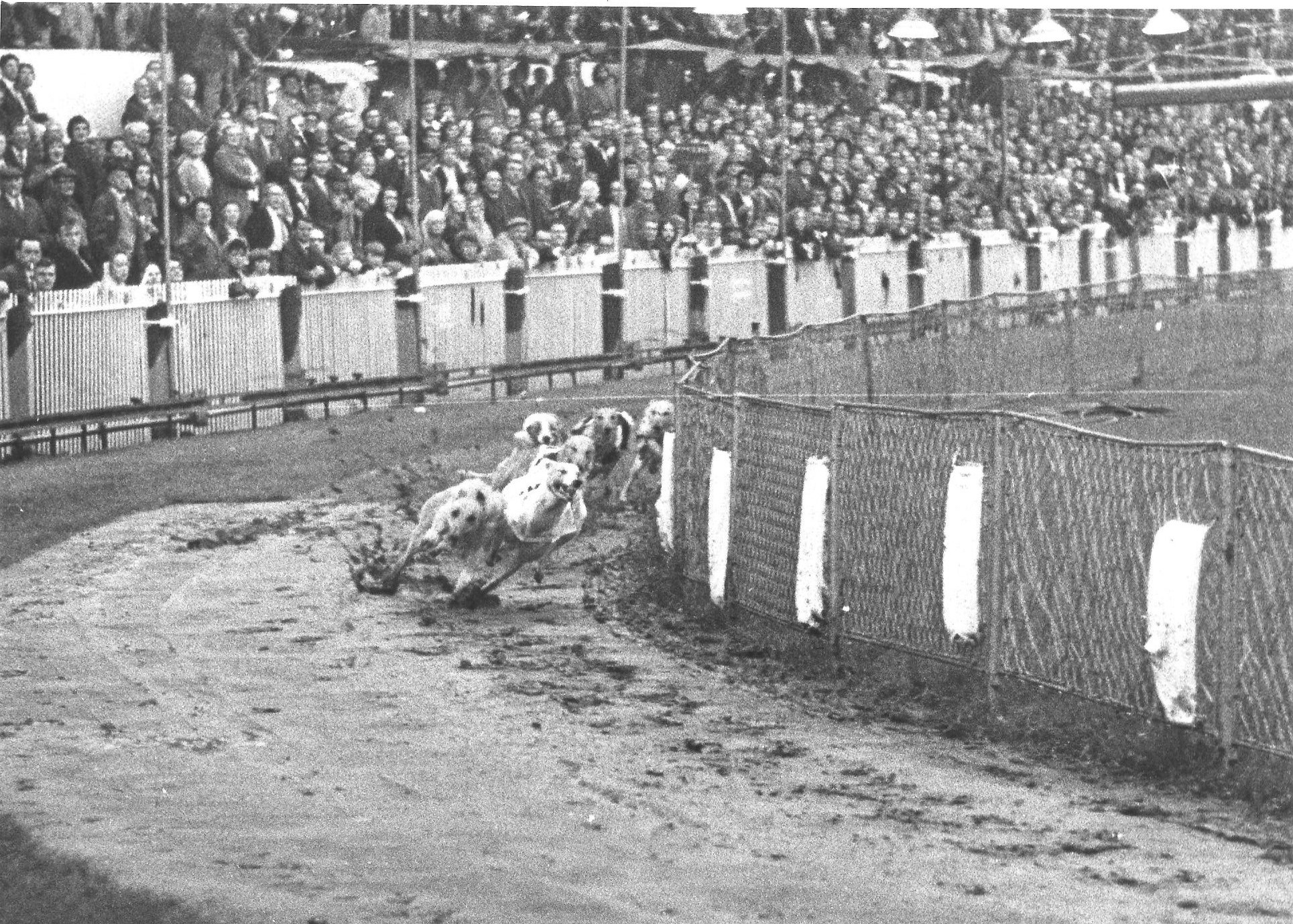
1972 Welsh Greyhound Derby final

The competition was held at the White City Stadium in Cardiff from 1928 to 1937. The competition was sometimes run as a handicap race.

After the closure of White City, the race switched to the Cardiff Arms Park from 1945 until 1977. It gained classic status in 1971.

When the Cardiff Arms Park closed to greyhound racing there was no remaining fully licensed National Greyhound Racing Club track in Wales resulting in the race discontinuing. During the vast majority of its existence the race formed part of the triple crown of racing alongside the English Greyhound Derby and Scottish Greyhound Derby.

The famous Mick the Miller, who was a household name during the 1930s won the event in 1930.

== Venues ==
- 1928–1937 (Welsh White City, Cardiff 525 yards)
- 1945–1974 (Arms Park, Cardiff 525 yards)
- 1975–1977 (Arms Park, Cardiff 500 metres)

== Past winners ==
Year	Winner	Breeding	Trainer	Time (sec)	SP	Notes/Ref
1928	Cheerful Choice	Mutton Cutlet – Glorious Still	Paddy Fortune (Welsh White City)	30.73	8/11f	
1929	Back Isle	Spike Island – Giddy Fiddler	Cronin	29.67	4/9f	
1930	Mick The Miller	Glorious Event – Na Boc Lei	Sidney Orton (Wimbledon)	29.55	1/8f	Track Record
1931	Altamatzin	Wily Warrior – Looks Likely	Arthur 'Doc' Callanan (Wembley)	29.88	2/1	
1932	Reel Tom	Melksham Tom – Rigadoon	Billy Quinn (Ireland)	29.87	5/1	
1933	Beef Cutlet	Mutton Cutlet – Burette	John Hegarty (Welsh White City)	29.56		
1934	Valiant Rufus	Red Robin – Hotel Avro	Leslie Carpenter (Gloucester)	30.08	1/1f	
1936	Bully Ring	Mount Hillarys Boy – Brittas Belle	Robert Linney (Gloucester)	30.28	4/1	
1937	Genial Radiance	Johnny Peters - Reymerston	J.W.Day (Private)	30.15	5/1	
1945	Shaggy Lass	Castledown Lad – Shaggy Shore	G.H.Vickery (Private)	29.75	4/5f	
1946	Negro's Lad	Kilrea Lad – Negro's Fire	Jack Toseland (Perry Barr)	29.54	8/1	Track record
1947	Trev's Perfection	Trevs Despatch - Friar Tuck	Fred Trevillion (Private)	29.74	1/3f	
1948	Local Interprize	Ruby Border - Mythical Daisy	Stan Biss (Clapton)	29.32	4/6f	
1950	Ballycurreen Garrett	Ballycurreen Duke – Ballymakeera Keeper	Jack Harvey (Wembley)	29.22	100/30	Track record
1951	Ballylanigan Tanist	Mad Tanist - Fly Dancer	Leslie Reynolds (Wembley)	29.95	1/1f	
1952	Endless Gossip	Priceless Border - Narrogar Ann	Leslie Reynolds (Wembley)	29.41	7/4	
1953	Glittering Look	Glittering Smack – Knockrour Favourite	Tom 'Paddy' Reilly (Walthamstow)	29.39	5/2	
1955	Rushton Mac	Rushton News – Rushton Panda	Frank Johnson (Private)	29.40	1/2f	
1957	Go Doggie Go	Ballymac Ball – Marchioness Minnie	Jack Toseland (Perry Barr)	29.38	5/4f	
1958	Our Defence	Defence Leader – Our Violet	Dennis O'Brien (Private)	30.27	6/1	
1959	Mile Bush Pride	The Grand Champion – Witching Dancer	Jack Harvey (Wembley)	28.80	8/11f	Track record
1960	Fitz's Star	Cheerful Chariot – Fitz's Lass	Tom 'Paddy' Reilly (Walthamstow)	29.48	4/1	
1961	Oregon Prince	Knock Hill Chieftain - Burleigh's Fancy	Phil Rees Sr. (Private)	28.86	2/5f	
1962	Summerhill Fancy	Knockrour Again – Brandon Princess	George Waterman (Wimbledon)	29.07	3/1	
1963	Fairys Chum	Knock Hill Chieftain – Fairy Julia	Bob Burls (Wembley)	29.49	4/1	
1964	Davo's Rink	Hopeful Cutlet – Move Along Kentucky	Tom Baldwin (Perry Barr)	28.84	9/4	
1965	Harmony	Mile Bush Pride – Perfect Queen	Jim Irving (Private)	29.43	3/1	
1966	I'm Quickest	Skips Choice – Gratton Star	Randy Singleton (White City)	29.59	3/1	
1968	Swift Half	Hack Up Chieftain – Imperial Astra	Jim Irving (Private)	29.58	9/2	
1969	Pallas Joy	Movealong Santa – Happy Now	Adam Jackson (Clapton)	29.43	7/2	
1970	Super Gamble	Flash Solar – Big Gamble	Paddy Coughlan (Private)	29.46	2/1	
1971	Spectres Dream	Spectres II – Jockeys Dream	Hugo Spencer (Portsmouth)	29.22	16/1	
1972	Patricias Hope	Silver Hope - Patsicia	Adam Jackson (Clapton)	29.75	3/1	
1973	Silly Rocket	Shanes Rocket – Silly Pride	Bertie Gaynor (Wolverhampton)	29.56	11/8f	
1974	Dankie	Monalee Champion – Weela Heather	Colin West (White City)	29.72	4/1	
1975	Baffling Bart	The Grand Silver - Mosaduva	Paddy Milligan (Private)	29.37	3/1	
1976	Cameo Colonel	Own Pride – New Curriculum	John Gibbons (Private)	29.63	10/1	
1977	Instant Gambler	Itsachampion - Sabrina	Barbara Tompkins (Private)	30.01	1/1f	

Discontinued
