= 1960 UK & Ireland Greyhound Racing Year =

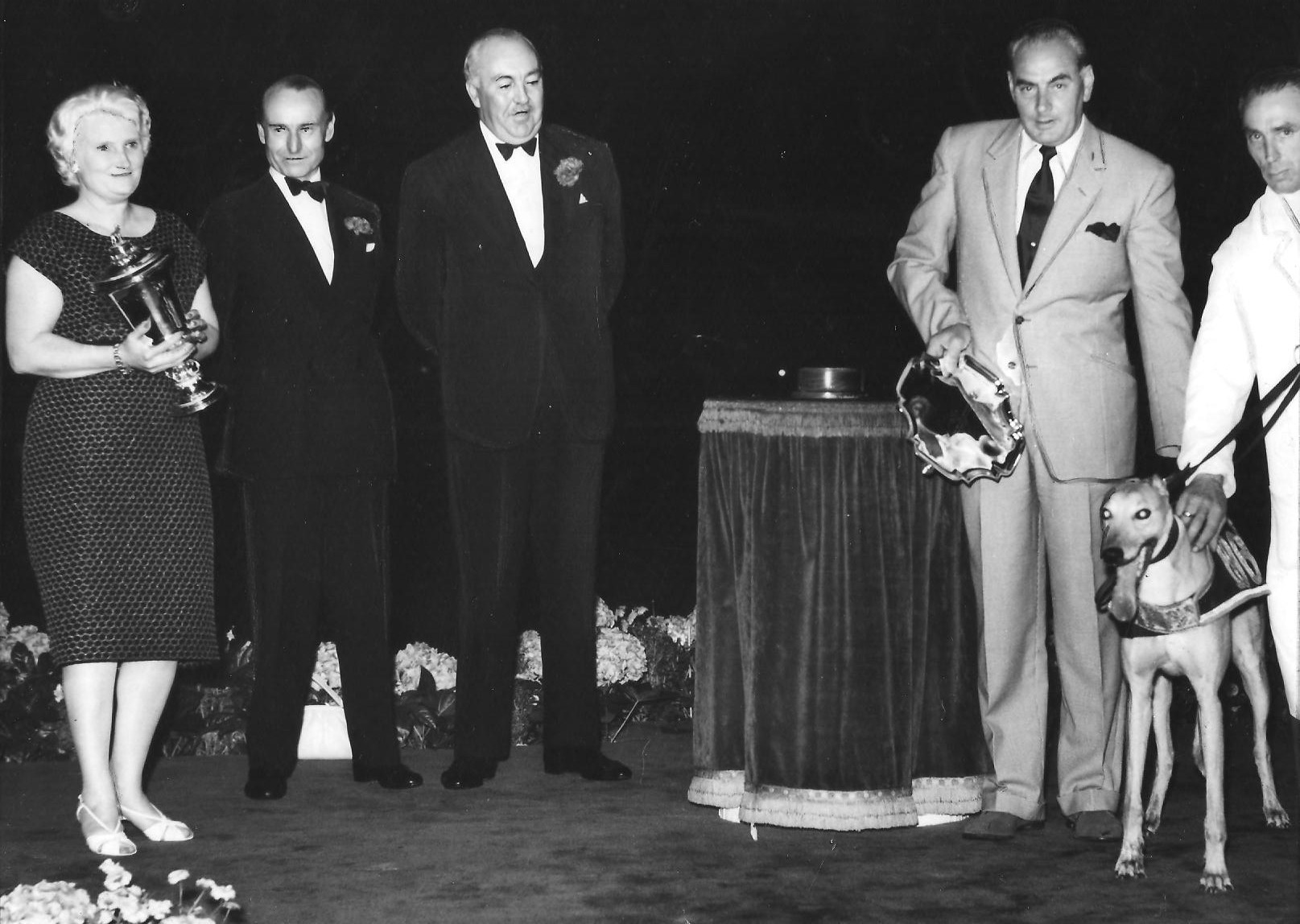
- Duleek Dandy (Derby champion)

The 1960 UK & Ireland Greyhound Racing Year was the 35th year of greyhound racing in the United Kingdom and the 34th year of greyhound racing in Ireland.

== Roll of honour ==
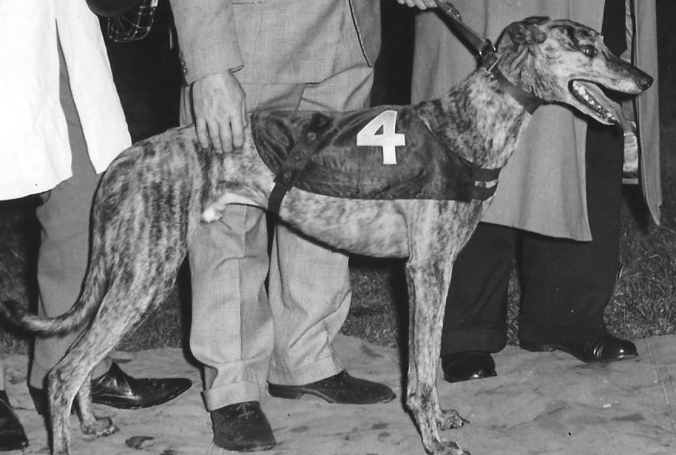
Gorey Airways

Major Winners
Award	Name of Winner
1960 English Greyhound Derby	Duleek Dandy
1960 Irish Greyhound Derby	Perrys Apple
1960 Scottish Greyhound Derby	Rostown Genius
1960 Welsh Greyhound Derby	Fitz's Star
Greyhound of the Year	Crazy Paving & Gorey Airways

== Summary ==
The National Greyhound Racing Club released the 1960 figures for their affiliated tracks, which showed that 14,243,808 paying customers attended 5,736 meetings. The totalisator turnover was £54,188,302 but government tote tax remained at 10% with track deductions remaining at 6%. Turnover and attendances remained stable but one piece of government legislation was about to have a dramatic impact on the industry. The Betting and Gaming Act 1960 was passed on 1 September 1960 and would come into effect four months later, on 1 January 1961.

== Tracks ==
Staines Greyhound Stadium closed, forcing Jack Walsh to open a bookmakers shop in Egham, Surrey, Walsh had been part owner with William Hill of the 1938 English Greyhound Derby winner Lone Keel.

Gerry Bailey and Jack Carter took over the lease at Rye House Stadium from the Lea Valley Regional Park Authority and immediately began to upgrade the facilities moving the greyhound track to the outside of the speedway track to form a 440-yard circumference. Racing was held on Wednesday and Saturday evenings and an 'Inside Sumner' system and photo finish was installed.

== Competitions ==
Mile Bush Pride reappeared after a remarkable 1959 and won the Wembley Spring Cup at his home track Wembley. His sire The Grand Champion was the leading sire in 1960. Scurry Gold Cup champion Gorey Airways ran a creditable second place behind Catch Cold in the Gold Collar at Catford Stadium.

Sprint champion Gorey Airways then became the first greyhound to successfully defend the Scurry Gold Cup, the Jimmy Jowett trained brindle ran out as easy five and a quarter length winner. The following month the Laurels at Wimbledon Stadium, attracted the usual strong entry and the £1,000 prize went to Dunstown Paddy with Gorey Airways finishing third and Clonalvy Pride fifth. The Derby champion Duleek Dandy broke a hock and could not contest any further races in 1960.

The Cesarewitch at West Ham Stadium was won by the Rostown Genius adding to his Scottish Greyhound Derby crown; Clonalvy Pride did win the Pall Mall Stakes and Select Stakes but finished his year underachieving after finishing fourth in the Cesarewitch final. He had been favourite for three classics and second favourite for the Derby and failed in all four attempts.

== News ==
A kennel block at Rochester Stadium suffered a terrible fire which resulted in the death of 24 greyhounds trained by Reg Morley. Morley and his head lad Mr Morton attempted to rescue them and both suffered injuries, Morley was brought out unconscious. Ken Appleton died and his West Ham Stadium kennels were taken over by his son Kenric Appleton.

== Ireland ==
The Bord na gCon installed a new totalisator system at four tracks Harolds Cross, Shelbourne Park, Cork and Limerick, in addition to obtaining Clonmel from the Morris family headed by T.A.Morris the former secretary of the Irish Coursing Club.

Dunmore Stadium in Belfast had sixty bookmakers operating on course, an unusually high amount but tote betting was still illegal in Northern Ireland despite the sport being more popular than in Southern Ireland.

During the 1960 Irish Greyhound Derby second round action, a puppy called Palms Printer ran on the supporting card and won a graded race in a very fast time. The pup was sold at the Shelbourne Park sales in November and was eventually bought by Paddy McEvoy for £400. The Irish Derby winner Perrys Apple and two finalists Eccentric Sam and Kilmoney Tulip all found themselves at the Shelbourne sales and surprisingly all three failed to meet their reserves, the champion Perrys Apple only attracted a 750 guineas.

The Irish Derby final was to be a final swansong for the great champion Pigalle Wonder, now aged four and a half years old, he was then retired. He would later become a prominent sire.

== Principal UK races ==
Grand National, White City (April 30 525y h, £300)
Pos	Name of Greyhound	Trainer	SP	Time	Trap
1st	Bruff Chariot	Jimmy Jowett	1-1f	29.50	3
2nd	Prince Again		2-1	29.82	2
3rd	Doron	Barney O'Connor	100-8	30.46	6
4th	Violets Fancy	Paddy McEllistrim	50-1	30.68	4
5th	Tom the Forkim	Clare Orton	40-1	30.94	5
6th	Final Selection	John Perrin	6-1	31.12	1

BBC Sportsview Trophy Harringay (May 2, 880y, £1,000)
Pos	Name of Greyhound	Trainer	SP	Time	Trap
1st	Crazy Paving	Charles Payne	100-7	51.22	5
2nd	Chantilly Lace	Jimmy Clubb	10-11f	51.23	3
3rd	Rapid Progress II	Gunner Smith	7-1	51.99	4
4th	Canadian Crawler	Ron Hookway	20-1	52.00	6
5th	Fearless Mac	Joe De Mulder	5-1	52.88	1
6th	Dunmore Rocco	Dennis Hannafin	5-2	00.00	2

Gold Collar, Catford (May 21, 440y, £500)
Pos	Name of Greyhound	Trainer	SP	Time	Trap
1st	Catch Cold	Dennis Hannafin	8-1	25.56	4
2nd	Gorey Airways	Jimmy Jowett	7-2	25.84	5
3rd	Flying Fox II	Jimmy Jowett	10-1	26.06	2
4th	Varra Black Nose	Dennis Hannafin	8-11f	26.08	3
5th	Granite Glittering	Reg Holland	6-1	26.62	6
6th	Last Chance		20-1	26.86	1

The Grand Prix Walthamstow (May 24, 500y, £600)
Pos	Name of Greyhound	Trainer	SP	Time	Trap
1st	Dunstown Paddy	Tom Reilly	11-4	28.26	6
2nd	Galbally Airways	Dr Dennis O’Brien	6-1	28.28	4
3rd	Noonans Rhapsody	Jimmy Jowett	33-1	28.50	3
4th	Violets Duke	Barney O'Connor	5-4f	28.62	5
5th	Town King		11-2	28.78	1
6th	Twinies Pet	Jimmy Jowett	8-1	28.88	2

Welsh Derby, Arms Park (Jul 1, 525y £500)
Pos	Name of Greyhound	Trainer	SP	Time	Trap
1st	Fitz's Star	Tom Paddy Reilly	4-1	29.48	1
2nd	Clonalvy Pride	Jack Harvey	4-6f	29.56	3
3rd	Loughane Airways	Miss C.Grove	20-1	29.70	4
4th	Prince of Shandrum	Jimmy Purnell	25-1	30.32	2
5th	Drumlee Ville	Jimmy Purnell	33-1	30.54	5
6th	Wincot Clifford	Jack Toseland	9-4	30.60	6

Oaks, Harringay (Jul 4, 525y, £500)
Pos	Name of Greyhound	Trainer	SP	Time	Trap
1st	Wheatfield Countess	Stan Martin	5-4f	29.33	1
2nd	Tillside Binnie	George Waterman	3-1	29.89	3
3rd	Miss Cheerful	Dave Geggus	9-4	30.21	6
4th	Black Rattler	Joe De Mulder	100-6	30.29	5
5th	Fancy Cinema	Harry Buck	20-1	30.41	4
6th	Barrack Street Ball	Reg Bosley	100-6	30.45	2

Scottish Greyhound Derby, Carntyne (Jul 9, 525y, £500)
Pos	Name of Greyhound	Trainer	SP	Time	Trap
1st	Rostown Genius	Joe Pickering	5-4f	28.92	6
2nd	Rorys Pleasure	P.O'Loughlin	5-1	29.08	2
3rd	Dunstown Paddy	Tom Reilly	2-1	29.12	1
4th	Firgrove Sorcerer	H Hancox	12-1	29.32	3
5th	Skibbereen Rocket	G Rodgerson	6-1	29.48	4
6th	Fitz's Star	Tom 'Paddy' Reilly	7-1	29.72	5

Scurry Gold Cup, Clapton (Jul 23, 400y £600)
Pos	Name of Greyhound	Trainer	SP	Time	Trap
1st	Gorey Airway	Jimmy Jowett	5-4f	22.48+	6
2nd	Snipe Island	Ronnie Melville	100-7	22.90	4
3rd	Cassagh Cheerful	Miss Mary Vaughan	100-8	23.12	2
4th	Dunstown Warrior	Tom 'Paddy' Reilly	100-8	23.28	5
5th	Violets Duke	Barney O'Connor	13-8	23.82	1
6th	All the Way Home	Ernie Westcott	7-1	24.26	3

+Track Record

Laurels, Wimbledon (Aug 19, 500y, £1,000)
Pos	Name of Greyhound	Trainer	SP	Time	Trap
1st	Dunstown Paddy	Tom 'Paddy' Reilly	5-1	28.02	4
2nd	Galbally Airways	Dr Dennis O'Brien	7-1	28.06	1
3rd	Gorey Airways	Jimmy Jowett	5-2	28.20	3
4th	Sailor Boy II	Dennis Hannafin	10-1	28.22	6
5th	Clonalvy Pride	Jack Harvey	9-4f	28.26	2
6th	Flying Fox II	Jimmy Jowett	7-2	28.40	5

St Leger, Wembley (Sep 5, 700y, £1,000)
Pos	Name of Greyhound	Trainer	SP	Time	Trap
1st	Jungle Man	Harry Tasker	2-1	40.08	4
2nd	First Offender	Ernie Westcott	10-1	40.12	2
3rd	Rostown Genius	Joe Pickering	11-4	40.34	3
4th	Joyful C	Jimmy Rimmer	33-1	40.38	5
5th	Merry Man	Kevin O'Neill	8-1	40.58	1
6th	Long Story	Jim Syder Jr.	7-4f	41.06	6

Cesarewitch, West Ham (Oct 7, 600y, £1,000)
Pos	Name of Greyhound	Trainer	SP	Time	Trap
1st	Rostown Genius	Joe Pickering	2-1	33.29	3
2nd	Merry Man (dead-heat)	Kevin O'Neill	100-8	33.61	2
2nd	Cross Word (dead-heat)	Arthur Hancock	11-2	33.61	4
4th	Clonalvy Pride	Jack Harvey	8-11f	33.67	5
5th	Winter Bell	Clare Orton	50-1	33.71	6
6th	Bermudas Cloud	Leslie Reynolds	33-1	33.83	1

== Totalisator returns ==
Extended content

The totalisator returns declared to the licensing authorities for the year 1960 are listed below. Not all track with tote facilities during 1960 are listed and tracks that did not have a totalisator in operation are not listed.

Stadium	Turnover £
London (White City)	5,155,242
London (Harringay)	3,749,853
London (Wimbledon)	3,315,712
London (Walthamstow)	2,586,506
London (Wembley)	2,555,218
London (Clapton)	2,251,990
Manchester (Belle Vue)	1,556,427
London (Catford)	1,535,477
London (Hackney)	1,393,647
Romford	1,008,264
Manchester (White City)	958,017
Brighton & Hove	844,175
Edinburgh (Powderhall)	844,223

Stadium	Turnover £
Birmingham (Perry Barr, old)	831,479
Birmingham (Hall Green)	820,414
Slough	687,494
Manchester (Salford)	670,241
Leeds (Elland Road)	662,364
Crayford & Bexleyheath	653,271
Newcastle (Brough Park)	649,413
Wolverhampton (Monmore)	648,397
Newcastle (Gosforth)	646,493
Southend-on-Sea	612,907
Sheffield (Owlerton)	529,794
Cardiff (Arms Park)	522,829
Willenhall	488,769

Stadium	Turnover £
Bristol (Eastville)	477,272
Ramsgate (Dumpton Park)	471,845
Glasgow (Shawfield)	464,848
Gloucester & Cheltenham	429,065
Reading (Oxford Road)	418,753
Middlesbrough	391,730
Rochester & Chatham	308,834
Hull (Old Craven Park)	301,825
Oxford	298,367
Leicester (Blackbird Rd)	286,405
Derby	274,724
Preston	236,663
Portsmouth	197,848
