= Sidney Orton =

British greyhound racing professional trainer (1890-1978)

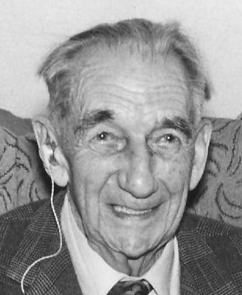

Personal information
- Born: 11 July 1890 Aylsham, England
- Died: 20 November 1978 (aged 88) Surrey, England
- Occupation: Greyhound trainer

Sport
- Sport: Greyhound racing

Achievements and titles
- National finals: Derby wins: English Derby (1930); Welsh Derby (1930); Classic/Feature wins: Cesarewitch (1930, 1934, 1938, 1946); Laurels (1930, 1934, 1936, 1937, 1938, 1945); St Leger (1931); Scurry Gold Cup (1934); Pall Mall Stakes (1947)

Sidney John Orton (11 July 1890 – 20 November 1978) was an English greyhound trainer. He was the trainer of Mick the Miller and a UK leading trainer during the 1930s.

== Biography ==
Orton was born in Aylsham, Norfolk and helped his parents run the family farm in Stonegate. He married Gladys Harmer in 1917 and had a family including a son called Sydney 'Clare' Orton in 1918. When oval circuit greyhound racing arrived in Britain in 1926, he swapped his interest in coursing to become Clerk of the Scales and then a trainer during the early years at Wimbledon Stadium.

The family lived in the Wimbledon trainers complex known as Burhill Kennels in Hersham, Walton-on-Thames. In December 1929, he was propelled to national fame when he took charge of Mick the Miller and won the 1930 English Greyhound Derby. He set a record of 315 winners in 1930 and had bettered it by the November of the following year in 1932.

During the 1930s, he won a significant number of classic races and was one of the leading trainers in the country. He earned the nickname 'The Wizard of Burhill'. He handled the famous greyhounds including Ballynennan Moon, Brilliant Bob, Ballyhennessy Sandhills, Quare Times, Mondays News and Burhill Moon before retiring in 1959.

His son, Clare, took up training in the late 1940s initially at Coventry and Clapton before taking over the Wimbledon contract when his father retired.

He died on 20 November 1978, aged 88.
