= White City Greyhounds =

Former greyhound racing operation in London, England

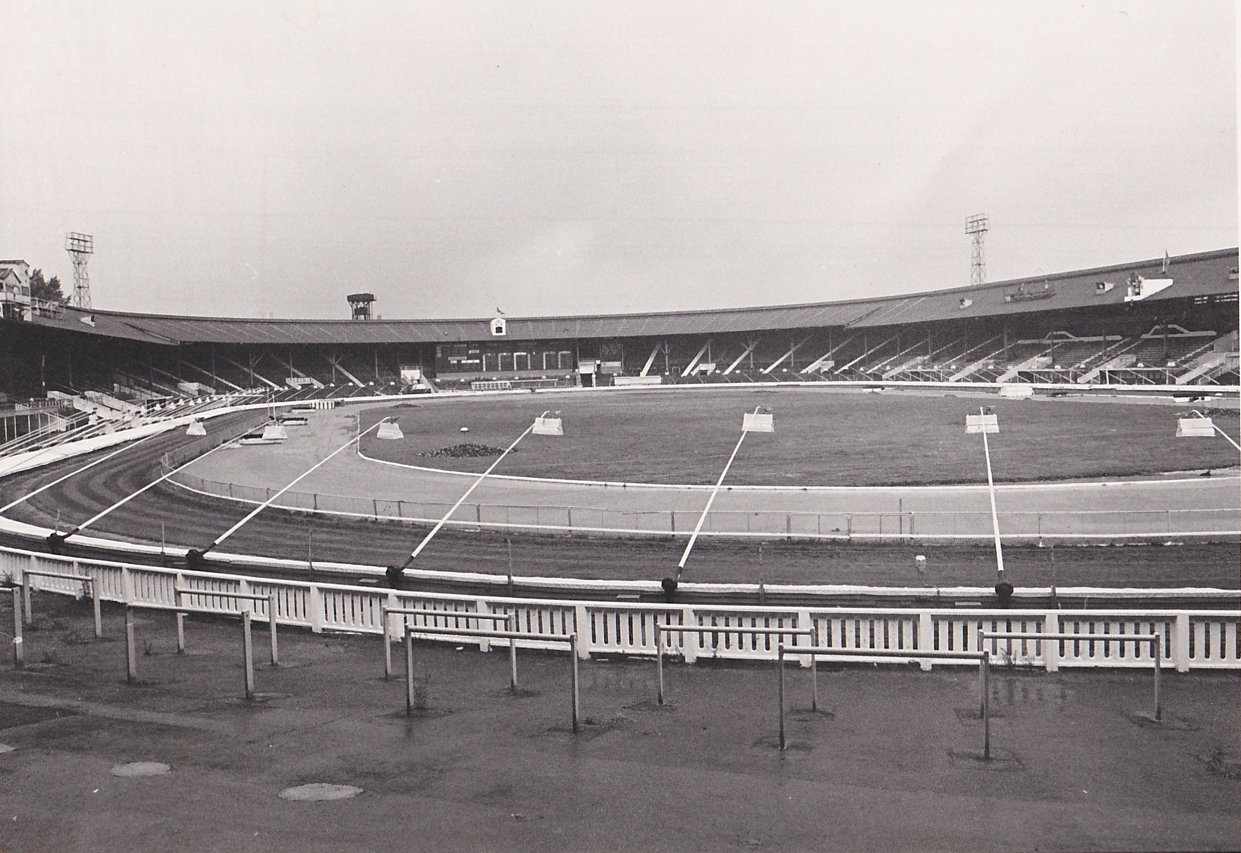
- circa.1960
- Interactive map of White City Greyhounds
- Location: London, England
- Coordinates: 51°30′48.6″N 0°13′38.5″W

Construction
- Opened: 1927
- Closed: 1984

White City Greyhounds was the greyhound racing operation held at White City Stadium in London. The venue was regarded as the sport's primary track during its existence.

== History ==
=== Origins ===
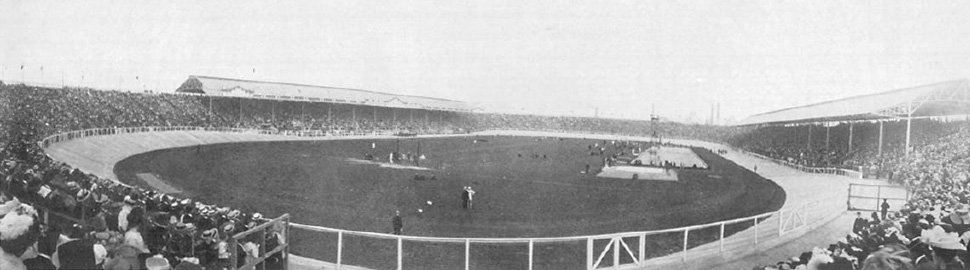
The White City Stadium during the 1908 Summer Olympics

After the 1908 Summer Olympics the White City area was used for further exhibitions, including the France-Britain Exhibition of 1908 and the Japan-Britain Exhibition of 1910, but the stadium began to be underused. By 1922 attempts had been made to sell it and it is reputed to have been in a very poor state by 1926. During the Februarys of 1926 and 1927 the stadium was used for the British Industries Fair before the public announcement that the Greyhound Racing Association (GRA) had purchased the stadium following on from the success experienced by the company at the nation's first greyhound meetings in Manchester at Belle Vue Stadium.

It would be the GRA's second stadium and the old running and cycle tracks were grassed over. A new restaurant was built and covered terracing was constructed. The Metropolitan Railway reopened their Wood Lane station in preparation for the race nights.

=== Opening ===
The first greyhounds moved into the kennels on 20 May and the first private trial was planned for 30 May with racing starting on 1 June but delays ensued. The first meeting finally took place on Monday 20 June 1927 with the first race won by a greyhound called Charlie Cranston. Entry Badge, the 1927 English Greyhound Derby winner, also ran on the opening night. There was a capacity of 93,000 and club house accommodation for 1,000 people more than the original seating capacity in 1908.

The track had a large 498 yards circumference with long straights of 120 yards described as good sweeping turns suitable for strong galloping type dogs. The hare system was an outside trolley type and the GRA’s finances were helped with the use of an automatic totalisator.

=== 1928-1939 ===
The GRA moved its headquarters to White City from Belle Vue and early visitors included the Prince of Wales later King Edward VIII and Prince George, later King George VI.

The English Greyhound Derby was inaugurated in 1927 followed by the Champion Hurdle (renamed the Grand National) the following year. The Oaks (for bitches only) would complete a trio of classic races. The GRA purchased the Hook estate at Northaw some 13 miles from the centre of London. They saw it as the ideal place for GRA trainers to train greyhounds for White City and Harringay Stadium which was their third track to open, and later other London tracks. The 140 acres of park and grassland became famous within the industry.

The Derby competition became the primary target for all greyhound connections. The first winner was Entry Badge who picked up 1,000, he was trained by local trainer Joe Harmon and had won a race on opening night. The following year all qualifying rounds would be held at White City which had not been the case in 1927.

In 1929 Mick the Miller arrived for his first Derby from Ireland and captured the public’s imagination sending greyhound racing into most households in Britain and Ireland. His successful defence of the title one year later drew a 50,000 crowd and the controversial final of 1931 attracted 70,000. Major Percy Brown was installed as Racing Manager (RM) in 1931 arriving from sister track Belle Vue and greyhounds that won the Derby over the following years found fame.

In 1936 the stadium introduced the Wood Lane Stakes and the 'White City', the former would remain an important race throughout the years but the latter was less known despite rewards that came second only to the Derby in terms of prize money. It was an invitation race for the sports top greyhounds but only lasted until the start of the war. In 1937 the Springbok and GRA Stakes was inaugurated for novice hurdlers and stayers respectively. Early track trainers included Leslie Reynolds, William Dixon, Albert Jonas, Les Parry and Harry Buck. A greyhound called Brave Don was the first to be transported to Britain from Ireland by air. He came into the kennels of Leslie Reynolds following a flight from Dublin to Croydon.

In 1938 the track boasted that they had the largest totalisator in the world with 634 issuing machines.

A record 92,000 people attended the 1939 English Greyhound Derby and the tote turnover set new records of £14,341 for a single race and £114,780 for a meeting. Using historic inflation (2019) this equates to £7.5 million for one meeting.

=== 1946-1950 ===
White City was the first track to install a photo finish camera made by Instaprint Camera Company of Sidmouth Street, London, in 1945 and the sport remained a national pastime after the war with the annual tote turnover for White City in 1946 being £17,576,190 (2015 equivalent £661 million).

In 1946 Bahs Choice went undefeated through the Wood Lane Stakes and on 6 June 1946 in a Derby trial, he recorded 28.99 sec to become the first dog in the world to break 29sec over 525 yards. Quare Times broke the track record twice during the 1946 event which led to Major Brown organising a match race between the pair at White City on August Bank Holiday Monday. Quare Times won the race setting a new world record for the 550 yards. Also in 1946 another new event was introduced called the Longcross Cup.

In 1949, three new sea-food bars attract more than 4,000 customers on race nights and the track employs 14 part time staff to cope with the demand.

=== 1950s ===
White City was featured in numerous films including the 1950 movie The Blue Lamp and one year later Major Percy Brown had to select 48 greyhounds for the Derby from a record 140 entries.

In December 1955 Spanish Battleship travelled to England for the first time for a special match race with Duet leader and Hi There at White City. Pigalle Wonder and Mile Bush Pride won the Derby during the 1950s and the Gimcrack (later called The Challenge) race was introduced in 1959 with the Oaks moving to sister track Harringay.

=== 1960s ===
In 1964 trainer Randolph Singleton was transferred to White City from Belle Vue and the GRA extended its board by adding Major Percy Brown, John Cearns (son of W.J Cearns) and Charles Chandler Jr. to the directors. Arthur Aldridge former RM of Powderhall Stadium and Belle Vue was brought in as the new White City RM. Camira Flash owned by the Duke of Edinburgh won the Derby for White City for only the third time.

A story broke in 1969 that the GRA had granted an option to Stock Conversion and Investment Ltd to purchase greyhound racing’s premier track White City for redevelopment. The official line was that a new modern White City stadium would be built in the remaining four acres from the existing sixteen. A greyhound reporter called Neil Martin stated this move must spell death to all sport there in time – and in my opinion greyhound racing too Fellow reporter John Bower had a different view that it would create a wonderful new stadium, a view seemingly given substance by GRA announcing that the architects plans were already drawn up. The future of the stadium was unknown.

=== 1970s ===
Patricias Hope won his second Derby and Sherrys Prince won his third consecutive Grand National victory in 1972, an added bonus for White City was that his trainer Colin West had recently joined the track. West and the Cambridgeshire competition had transferred from the recently closed West Ham Stadium. In 1972 GRA Director of racing Major Percy Brown retired after 40 years in the sport, his replacement was the Arthur Aldridge. In 1975 the track switched to metres under the supervision of RM Bob Rowe.

=== 1981-1984 ===
During 1982 Bob Rowe relinquished his position to take up the role of chief racing manager of the GRA with John Collins brought in as the new RM. Also in 1982 trainer Joe Pickering (who joined the track in 1956) retired as did Colin West leaving White City two trainers short. They appointed Graham Mann and Frank Melville. Randy Singleton retired soon after.

=== Closure ===
The 1969 option to sell to Stock Conversion and Investment Ltd for redevelopment had almost been forgotten due to the fact that racing had continued for another 15 years but in 1984 the redevelopment plans went ahead without plans to build a new stadium. The final Derby took place in late June before the final meeting on 22 September 1984. Hastings Girl trained by Tommy Foster was the last winner and before the month had passed demolition teams had demolished the historic stadium.

The GRA, the company who introduced greyhound racing to Britain had sold the sports premier track which became a collection of BBC buildings.

== Competitions ==
=== English Greyhound Derby ===
The stadium had four home trained Derby winners, Entry Badge (1927), Wild Woolley (1932), Greta Ranee (1935) and Camira Flash (1968).

=== Longcross Cup ===
Extended content

The Longcross Cup was a competition held from 1946 until the stadium closed.

Year	Winner	Breeding	Trainer	Time (sec)	SP	Note/ref
1946	Overtime	Woodrow – Hardwick Elsie	Paddy Fortune (Wimbledon)	32.03	7/2	
1947	Highland Melody	–	Harry Spoor (New Cross)	32.50	10/11f	
1948	Sheevaun	Bellas Prince – Honey Gale	Paddy Fortune (Wimbledon)	31.29	4/7f	
1949	Sheevaun	Bellas Prince – Honey Gale	Paddy Fortune (Wimbledon)	31.08	4/11f	
1950	Despot O'Leer	Bahs Choice – Baytown Nightingale	Leslie Reynolds (Wembley)	30.58	2/1	
1951	Derryboy Blackbird	Mad Tanist – Swiss Miss	Stan Martin (Wimbledon)	31.00	11/8f	
1952	Seal Astra	Astras Son – Atomic Seal	Tom Lightfoot (White City)	30.28	4/5f	
1953	Oriel Olga	Slaney Record – Janet	Dal Hawkesley (West Ham)	30.60	7/2	
1954	Lizette	Master Captain – Dorothy Ann	Paddy Fortune (Wimbledon)	31.32	8/11f	
1955	Midnight Colonist	Humming Bee – Midnight Candle	Reg Bosley (Hackney)	31.99	6/1	
1956	Yon Cassius	Mad Astley – Dusky Jewel	Ronnie Melville (Wembley)	30.82	6/5f	
1957	Christmas Island	Shaggy Lad – Pair of Queens	T Harris (Private)	30.64	11/4	
1958	Knock Hill Chieftain	Galtee Cleo – Coolkill Mistress	Stan Martin (Wimbledon)	30.55	4/6f	
1959	Merville	The Grand Champion – Fleeting Ash	Ken Appleton (West Ham)	30.96	13/8f	
1960	Prince of Speed	Prince of Bermuda – Seafield Biddy	Jimmy Jowett (Clapton)	30.44	100/8	
1961	Workaway	The Grand Champion – Templenoe Fireaway	George Waterman (Wimbledon)	30.75		
1962	Dainty Spark	Hi There – Wild Princess	Fred Taylor (White City)	30.38		
1963	Lucky Joan II	Recorded Course – Astraea	John Bassett (Clapton)	30.64		
1964	Failte Mal	Welcome Home – Moko	Bill Dash (Private)	30.62	11/4	
1965	O'Leary	Solar Prince – Cracked Kate	Jim Hookway (Owlerton)	30.66		
1966	Wonder Hill	Clopook – The Ivy Bar	George Carrigill (Private)	31.03		
1967	Monalee Champion	Crazy Parachute – Sheila At Last	Frank Conlon (Private)	29.82		
1968	Switch Hitter	Rocket Ship – Lannon Lass	Jim Barker (Reading)			
1970	Tullyallen	Hi Frequency – Cremona Maid	Clare Orton (Wimbledon)	30.42		
1971	Monas Flash	Forward Flash – Shee Mone	John Perrin (Slough)	41.42		
1972	Brookside Prince	Tell Nobody – Brookside Louise	Frank Melville (Harringay)	41.37	1/1f	
1973	Commutering	Dusty Trail – No Mabel	Frank Melville (Harringay)	40.87	3/1	
1974	Westpark Mustard	Newdown Heather – April Merry	Tom Johnston Jr. (Wembley)	41.03	4/11f	
1975	Westmead Bounty	Westmead County – Hacksaw	Arnold Mobley (Private)	42.23		
1976	Sallys Cobbler	Cobbler – Pineapple Jam	John Bassett (Private)	40.85	5/4f	
1977	Fly By Night	Moordyk Champion – Fly Snowdrop	Colin West (White City)	42.99	2/1	
1978	Black Legend	Spectre II – Nora Again	Ted Dickson (Slough)	41.81		
1979	Beaverwood Tony	Foreign Exchange – Handy High	Paddy Milligan (Private)	42.53		
1980	Musical Lady	Sage – Cois Na Gorm	Adam Jackson (Wembley)	41.18		
1981	Decoy Boom	Westmead County – Ka Boom	Joe Cobbold (Ipswich)	42.20		
1982	Alfa My Son	Alfa Boy – Tough Jackie	Leon Steed (Cambridge)	42.65		
1983	The Italian Job	Cosmic Orbit – Stylish Dolores	Gunner Smith (Brighton)	41.26		
1984	Kasama Trac	Butchers Trac – Lady Kasama	George Curtis (Brighton)	42.02		

1946-1970 (550 yards), 1971-1974 (725 yards), 1977-1984 (680 metres)

=== Wood Lane Stakes ===
Extended content

The Wood Lane Stakes was a competition held from 1936 until the stadium closed.

Year	Winner	Breeding	Trainer	Time (sec)	SP	Note/ref
1936	Shove Halfpenny	Town Treasure – Princess Karl	Jack Harvey (Wembley)			
1937	Lewis of Waterhall	Beef Cutlet – Lady Eleanor	Paddy Fortune (Wimbledon)	30.41	6/1	
1938	Demotic Mack	Beef Cutlet – Kaiti Hill	Charlie Cross (Clapton)	29.85	7/1	
1939	Ballyjoker	Beef Cutlet – Jeanne of Waterhall	Sidney Orton (Wimbledon)	29.28	7/4	
1946	Bahs Choice	Tokio – Chittering Duchess	Bob Burls (Wembley)	29.48	11/10f	
1947	Dante II	Well Squared – Olives Idol	Wilf France Harringay)	29.92	2/1	
1948	Priceless Border	Clonahard Border – Priceless Sandills	Leslie Reynolds (Wembley)	29.18	1/5f	
1949	Behattan Marquis	Countryman – Behattan	Bob Burls (Wembley)			
1950	Red Wind	Dysertmore Prince – Light Biddy	Fred Trevillion (Private)	29.38	5/6f	
1951	Fancy Hero	Trabolgan Prince – Carriganea Lass	Jack Harvey (Wembley)	30.23	5-4f	
1952	Seal Astra	Astras Son – Atomic Seal	Tom Lightfoot (White City)	29.15	4/9f	
1953	Midnight Charlotte	Rimmells Black – Midnight Cradle	Stan Martin (Wimbledon)	29.80	100/6	
1954	Home Luck	Trevs Cutter – Queens Wood	Frank Johnson (Private)	28.33	4/9f	
1955	Coolkill Chieftain	Celtic Chief – Coolkill Darkie	Jack Harvey (Wembley)	29.26	8/1	
1956	Duet Leader	Champion Prince – Derryluskin Lady	Tom Paddy Reilly (Walthamstow)	29.00	8/13f	
1957	Racing Don	–	Jim Syder Jr. (Wembley)	29.27	7/1	
1958	Beware Champ	The Grand Champion – Beware of Me	Paddy Fortune (Wimbledon)	28.93	4/1	
1959	Pigalle Wonder	Champion Prince – Prairie Peg	Jim Syder Jr. (Wembley)	29.47	4/7f	
1960	Long Story	Flash Jack – I'm Yours	Jim Syder Jr. (Private)	28.83	2/1	
1961	Oregon Prince	Knock Hill Chieftain – Burleighs Fancy	Phil Rees Sr. (Private)	28.90		
1962	Westpark	Hi There – Faoide	Tom Paddy Reilly (Walthamstow)	29.00		
1963	Westpark	Hi There – Faoide	Tom Paddy Reilly (Walthamstow)	29.04		
1964	Atomic Knockrour	Knockrour Again – Atomic Tulip	Jim Irving (Private)	29.01	100/8	
1965	Booked Out	Knock Hill Chieftain – Direct Lead	Eric Adkins (Private)	29.90		
1966	Morden Mist	Super Orange – Denver Hetty	Clare Orton (Wimbledon)	29.45		
1967	Double Rock	Printer's Present – Dolores Daughter	Paddy Milligan (Private)	28.94		
1968	Yellow Printer	Printer's Prince – Yellow Streak	John Bassett (Clapton)	28.91		
1969	Avondhu Iron	Mad Era – Knock Rose	Paddy Milligan (Private)	29.16	7/1	
1970	Tullyallen	Hi Frequency – Cremona Maid	Clare Orton (Wimbledon)	29.44	10/1	
1971	Linmaree	Spectre II – Nevasca	Colin West (White City)	28.85		
1972	After the Show	Dusty Trail – No Mabel	Jim Singleton Harringay)	29.24	11/4	
1973	Skyhawk Monalee	Arkle – Little Play Girl	Tom Johnston Jr. (Wembley)	29.05	8/15f	
1974	Myrtown	Myross Again – Longstown Lassie	Eddie Moore (White City, Man)	28.68	8/11f	
1975	Sampson Flash	Clomoney Jet – Eyre Pride	Tom Johnston Jr. (Wembley)	29.98		
1976	Princeley Moment	Motor Light – Star Expert	Wally Ginzel (Wembley)	29.41	13/2	
1977	Swibo	Monalee Champion – Damsels Speck	Terry Dartnall (Reading)	30.17		
1978	Instant Gambler	Itsachampion – Sabrina	Barbara Tompkins (Private)	30.42		
1979	Our Rufus	Rail Ship – Geraldine Gold	John Coleman (Wembley)	30.02		
1980	Jon Barrie	Clashing – Famous Heart	Ray Andrews (Leeds)	29.99		
1981	Corrakelly Air	Supreme Fun – Quarry Streaker	Charlie Coyle (Private)	30.58	9/4	
1982	Chimney Sweep	Violet Hall – Salubrious Lady	Ray Andrews (Belle Vue)	30.10	11/10f	
1983	Aglish Poacher	Knockrour Slave – Aglish Pilgrim	Jerry Fisher (Reading)	29.43		
1984	Game Ball	Sand Man – Stay In Business	Jerry Fisher (Reading)	29.74		

1936-1975 (525 yards), 1976-1984 (500 metres)

=== The White City ===
Extended content

Year	Winner	Breeding	Trainer	Time (sec)	SP	Note/ref
1936	Safe Rock	Danielli – ABC	Fred Wilson (Rochester)	31.21	15/2	
1937	Ballyhennessy Sandills	White Sandills – Soraca Deas	Sidney Orton (Wimbledon)	28.39	9/4jf	
1938	Quarter Day	Lawyers Fee – House Keeper	Joe Harmon (Wimbledon)	29.58	2/1f	

1936 (550 yards), 1937 (500 yards), 1937 (525 yards)

=== G.R.A Stakes ===
Extended content

The G.R.A (Greyhound Racing Association) Stakes was a competition held from 1937 until the stadium closed.

Year	Winner	Breeding	Trainer	Time (sec)	SP	Note/ref
1937	Maidens Delight	Maidens Boy – Springfield Sal	Jim Syder Sr. (Wembley)	42.03	11/10f	
1939	Gretas Rosary	Mick The Miller – Greta Ranee	Eddie Wright Harringay)	41.70	11/8f	
1946	Coynes Castle	Castledown Lad – Unequalled Lady	Ken Newham (Warrington)	40.53	5/2	
1949	Alvaston Muir	Model Dasher – Alvaston Heather Blue	Stan Martin (Wimbledon)	42.10	7/4f	
1950	Nervous Paddy	Paddy The Champion – Elusive Bess	L M Hiscock (Stamford Bridge)	41.09	3/1	
1952	Pass On Express	–	Tom Lightfoot (White City)	45.85	8/11f	
1953	Border Lad	–	Wally Hancox (Hall Green)	47.10	7/1	
1954	Sundown Silver Stream	Sandown Champion – Knight Shade	Jim Syder Jr. (Wembley)	46.16	6/1	
1955	Oriel Olga	Slaney Record – Janet	Dal Hawkesley (West Ham)	46.32	1/4f	
1956	Speir Bhean	Maddest Neighbour – My Dreamland	Jack Harvey (Wembley)	45.86	7/4	
1957	Rathmore Rainbow	April Tanist – Rathmore Tutsy	Ivor Morse (Harringay)	46.60	2/7f	
1958	Holystone Mischief	Holystone Lifelong – Elphin Girl	Jimmy Purnell (Private)	46.97	11/4	
1959	Noras Jewel	Imperial Dancer – Noras Birthday	Jack Harvey (Wembley)	46.25	7/2	
1960	Chinese Rose	The Grand Champion – Rose Confection	Tim Forster Harringay)	45.48	100/8	
1961	The Cherry Tree	Cheeky Tippy – Clonbrick Rose	Harry Tasker (Private)	50.09		
1962	The Cherry Tree	Cheeky Tippy – Clonbrick Rose	Harry Tasker (Private)	50.79		
1963	Hillstride	Knockhill Chieftain – Miss Lorraine	Tom Perry (Private)	51.52	2/9f	
1964	Ballymotey Boy	Solar Prince – July Flower	Dal Hawkesley (West Ham)	51.50		
1965	Boothroyden Flash	Crazy Parachute – Knockmullagh Lady	Harry Bamford (Private)	51.86		
1966	Ballyloo Hind	Hi There – Craan Majestic	Sid Ryall (Private)	50.42		
1967	Come on Dolores	Knock Hill Chieftain – Sultry Peach	Ernie Gaskin Sr. (Private)	50.30		
1968	Poor Mick	Crazy Parachute – Dearnside	Randy Singleton (White City)	50.42	9/2	
1969	Farma Zora	Mad Era – Rorys Sally	Phil Rees Sr. (Wimbledon)	51.04	11/4	
1970	Hiver Whitenose	Crazy Society – Hiver Swanky	Jim Morgan (Private)	50.85		
1972	The Marchioness	Faithful Hope – Trojan Silver	Reg Young (Private)	51.37	4/6f	
1973	Balliniska Gun	Russian Gun – Parlando	Arthur Hancock (Brighton)	45.09	25/1	
1974	Westpark Mustard	Newdown Heather – April Merry	Tommy Johnston Jr. (Wembley)	44.73	1/5f	
1975	Westmead Bounty	Westmead County – Hack Saw	A J Mobley (Private)	45.86		
1977	Montreen	Moordyke Spot – Avondale	Harry Bamford (Belle Vue)	44.68	7/4	
1981	Decoy Boom	Westmead County – Ka Boom	Joe Cobbold (Ipswich)			
1982	Paradise Lost	Paradise Spectre – Gerards Sally	George Curtis (Brighton)	44.67	9/2	

1937-50 (725 yards), 1938 & 1940-45 (not held), 1952-60 & 1973-1975 (800 yards), 1961-72 (880 yards) 1976-1982 (730 metres)

=== Gimcrack/Challenge ===
Extended content

The Gimcrack was renamed The Challenge in 1967 and was a competition held from 1959 until 1972.

Year	Winner	Breeding	Trainer	Time (sec)	SP	Note/ref
1959	Miss Cheerful	Cheerful Chariot – Miss Mink	Dave Geggus (Walthamstow)	29.33	100/30	
1960	Wheatfield Countess	Our Viscount – Wheatfield Satellite	Stan Martin (Wimbledon)	29.88	100/30	
1961	The Grand Canal	Champion Prince – The Grand Duchess	Paddy Dunphy (Ireland)	29.30		
1962	Dromin Glory	Hi There – Dromin Jet	John Bassett (Clapton)	29.19		
1963	Fairys Chum	Knockhill Chieftain – Fairy Julia	Bob Burls (Wembley)	29.15		
1964	Hack Up Chieftain	Knockhill Chieftain – Bunclody Queen	Randy Singleton (White City)	29.36	9/1	
1965	Clonmannon Flash	Prairie Flash – Dainty Sister	Jim Hookway (Owlerton)	29.37		
1966	Dusty Trail	Printers Present – Dolores Daughter	Paddy Milligan (Private)	29.12		
1967	Shady Parachute	Crazy Parachute – Shady Contempera	Phil Rees Sr. (Wimbledon)	28.94		
1969	Kilbelin Style	Prairie Flash – Clomoney Grand	Tom Johnston Jr. (Wembley)	29.07	10/11f	
1970	Linmaree	Spectre – Nevasca	Les Parry (White City)	29.02		
1972	Priory Hi	Maryville Hi – Miss Hi Land	Pen Andrews (Private)	29.04	7/2	

- 1959-72 (525 yards)

== Track records ==
Extended content

Pre-metric

Yards	Greyhound	Time (sec)	Date	Notes/ref
500	Outside Left	27.55	12 July 1958	
525	Mick the Miller	29.82	16 July 1929	Derby heats, world record
525	Ryland R	29.69	16 July 1931	Derby heats
525	Future Cutlet	29.62	July 1932	Derby heats
525	Shove Halfpenny	29.47	1936	
525	Fine Jubilee	29.47	1936	
525	Wattle Bark	29.36	June 1937	Derby heats
525	Shove Halfpenny	29.36	19 June 1937	Derby semi-finals
525	Wattle Bark	29.26	26 June 1937	Derby final
525	Quare Times	28.95	June 1946	Derby heats, world record
525	Quare Times	28.82	29 June 1946	Derby consolation, world record
525	Priceless Border	28.??	1947/48	
525	Priceless Border	28.64	June 1948	Derby heats
525	Pauls Fun	28.64	19 June 1954	Derby semi-finals
525	Kilcaskin Kern	28.63	June 1958	Derby heats
525	Mile Bush Pride	28.60	June 1958	Derby semi finals
525	Pigalle Wonder	28.44	21 June 1958	Derby semi finals
525	Yellow Printer	28.30	3 June 1968	Derby heats, world record
525	Super Rory	28.26	17 June 1972	Derby semi-finals
550	Ataxy	30.97	10 August 1935	
550y	Glen Ranger	30.76	2 July 1938	
550y	Glen Ranger	30.66	13 August 1938	
550y	Quare Times	30.38	5 August 1946	Match v Bahs Choice
550y	Ballymac Ball	30.30	10 December 1949	
550y	Ballymac Ball	30.27	26 December 1949	
550y	Fearless Mac	29.93	3 August 1959	
550y	Monalee Champion	29.82	7 January 1967	
700y	Bradshaw Fold	40.74	1929	
700y	Mick The Moocher	40.68	30 March 1935	
725y	Shaggy Lass	41.43	6 May 1946	
725y	Fearless Mac	40.64	11 July 1959	
725y	Murray Grant	40.63	27 July 1963	
725y	Cash For Dan	40.16	28 June 1969	
800y	Ryans Rose	45.69	1950	
800y	Western Stream	??	1954	
800y	Jockey Club	45.30	30 May 1956	
800y	Bella Bambino	45.15	31 October 1964	
800y	Poor Mick	44.90	1970	
800y	Lively Mandy	44.89	2 October 1971	
880y	The Cherry Tree	49.99	17 March 1962	
880y	Cash For Dan	49.44	16 October 1969	TV Trophy final
1025y	Gentle Charmer	60.89	1954	
1025y	Yason	60.88	21 August 1954	
1025y	Rimmell's Pearl	59.75	23 October 1954	
1025y	Rozels Blue Girl	59.52	27 June 1964	
1025y	Greenville Fauna	58.60	18 July 1968	
525yH	Hawtrey	30.58	18 May 1935	
525yH	Barrowside	29.43	7 May 1955	Grand National final
525yH	Lucky Orange	29.34	1970	
525yH	Sherrys Prince	29.10	8 May 1971	
550yH	Barrowside	31.35	23 April 1955	
550yH	Spotless O'Leer	31.35	4 June 1955	=equalled
550yH	Indoor Sport	31.16	28 July 1962	
550yH	Sherrys Prince	30.62	16 October 1969	
725yH	Gypsy Boy	41.84	27 June 1959	
550yC	Fodda Champion	31.18	29 May 1957	Chase

Post-metric

Distance	Greyhound	Time (sec)	Date	Notes/ref
268m	Mutts Silver	15.70	1976	
268m	Travara Rock	15.67	1981	
500m	Sallys Cobbler	29.31	19 June 1975	Derby 2nd round
500m	Slippery Slave	29.26	19 June 1975	Derby 2nd round
500m	Myrtown	29.23	21 June 1975	Derby semi finals
500m	Ballybeg Prim	29.23	5 June 1976	Derby qual round
500m	Shamrock Point	29.18	17 June 1976	Derby quarter finals
500m	Glen Rock	29.16	1977	World record
500m	Balliniska Band	29.16	25 June 1977	Derby final
500m	Parkdown Jet	29.09	20 June 1981	Derby semi-finals
500m	Hay Maker Mack	28.95	25 June 1983	
680m	Sallys Cobbler	40.85	1975	
680m	Brampton Badger	40.80	27 June 1981	
730m	Glin Bridge	44.03	1980	
730m	Fair Reward	43.93	27 June 1981	
962m	Westown Adam	59.81	1980	
962m	Portland Dusty	59.81	1980	
730m	Westown Adam	59.81	1981	=track record
500mH	Moon View	30.09	1980	
680mH	Topofthetide	42.56	1979	
