= 1958 UK & Ireland Greyhound Racing Year =

The 1958 UK & Ireland Greyhound Racing Year was the 33rd year of greyhound racing in the United Kingdom and the 32nd year of greyhound racing in Ireland.

== Roll of honour ==
Major Winners
Award	Name of Winner
1958 English Greyhound Derby	Pigalle Wonder
1958 Irish Greyhound Derby	Colonel Perry
1958 Scottish Greyhound Derby	Just Fame
1958 Welsh Greyhound Derby	Our Defence
Greyhound of the Year	Pigalle Wonder

== Summary ==
The National Greyhound Racing Society (the management branch of the National Greyhound Racing Club agreed a deal with the BBC to provide an annual greyhound event which would be shown live on Sportsview. The race would be known as the Sportsview BBC Television Trophy with the venues to be changed each year. The first competition was at Wimbledon over 500 yards but it was soon discovered that the distance was too short for the viewers to remain interested, which resulted in a switch to longer distances the following year. The inaugural event was claimed by trainer Leslie Reynolds with a 20/1 shot called Town Prince.

Pigalle Wonder was voted Greyhound of the Year, after a year that included winning the 1958 English Greyhound Derby at White City, Cesarewitch at West Ham Stadium and Pall Mall Stakes at Harringay Stadium.

== Competitions ==
Pigalle Wonder's victory in the Pall Mall included a time of 29.03 seconds for 525 yards, which was not beaten for years. Another time he set at Wembley (28.78sec) stood for almost twenty years until the distance was changed to metres. In the TV Trophy he gained all of the attention despite finishing fourth to Town Prince when expected to win, at odds of 1-4f. He had previously won his heat at Powderhall Stadium in a new track record time of 27.97.

There was a major gamble on Our Defence in the Welsh Greyhound Derby final, that had been moved to October due to the Commonwealth Games using the venue in the summer. Because of very wet weather the newly laid track surface became a quagmire with straw being laid on top. Despite this the gamble was landed by the owner trainer, Dr Dennis O'Brien.

== Tracks ==
The Franklin family took sole control of Yarmouth Stadium following the death of Clifford Yaxley and the Arms Park in Cardiff was taken over for the Commonwealth Games and afterwards the circuit was re-laid before the Welsh Derby took place.

== News ==
Harringay Arena was converted into a food storage facility following the sale of the venue the previous year by the Greyhound Racing Association (GRA). The greyhound companies continued to complain at the 10% tax imposed on betting. Wimbledon trainer Paddy Fortune died and his kennels were taken over by George Waterman. Another change came when Sidney Orton retired and his son Clare Orton (a trainer at Clapton) took up his position at Wimbledon. Clare had been a trainer in his own right for nearly ten years.

The GRA senior vet James Bateman was awarded the Victory Medal by the Royal College of Veterinary Surgeons. He had been successful in fitting a plastic scaphoid bone in a greyhound.

Con Stevens applied to the NGRC for a rule change concerning disqualifications. He believes that ungenuine greyhounds in addition to fighters should be disqualified by Racing Managers.

== Ireland ==
The Irish Greyhound Board (Bord na gCon) in Limerick was given the responsibility of all tracks in Ireland by the Dáil Éireann, with the exception of the Ulster tracks that would remain under the jurisdiction of the Irish Coursing Club. The Bord na gCon was established under the Greyhound Industry Act of 1958 with a number of aims. The body was formed to regulate the industry, operate a tote betting system, licence and authorise each stadium, its officials, and its on-course bookmakers, and promote the sport through advertising and prize grants. The new Board includes Dr P.J. Maguire and Captain John Ross.

Harold's Cross re-introduced sales trials and called in British auctioneers Aldridges. Mrs Olive Tasker took the 1958 Irish Greyhound Derby winner Colonel Perry back to England and the greyhound went on to win the Midland Flat with John Bassett.

== Principal UK races ==
Grand National, White City (May 3 525y h, £300)
Pos	Name of Greyhound	Trainer	SP	Time	Trap
1st	Fodda Champion	Jimmy Jowett	7-4f	30.20	4
2nd	Midnight Cossack	Joe Pickering	8-1	30.30	5
3rd	Vintners Cup	Jim Syder Jr.	20-1	30.40	2
4th	Tanyard Tulip	Jack Harvey	11-4	30.58	1
5th	Highway Tim	Mrs Rosalie Beba	6-1	30.62	6
6th	Prince Poppit	Dennis Hannafin	3-1	30.88	3

Gold Collar, Catford (May 24, 440y, £500)
Pos	Name of Greyhound	Trainer	SP	Time	Trap
1st	Five Up	Ron Chamberlain	6-4f	25.43	4
2nd	Wickham Hotel	Bill Dash	6-1	25.79	6
3rd	Simmer Down Pal	Joe Booth	10-3	25.97	1
4th	Dangerous Customer	Dennis Hannafin	3-1	26.11	2
5th	Gorm Riac	Ron Chamberlain	100-8	26.25	5
6th	Recorded Course	Les Parry	100-6	26.41	3

Scottish Greyhound Derby, Carntyne (Jul 12, 525y, £500)
Pos	Name of Greyhound	Trainer	SP	Time	Trap
1st	Just Fame	Tom Johnston Sr.	4-1	29.36	2
2nd	More Talent	Bob Burls	10-1	29.39	3
3rd	Ballypatrick	Cyril Beaumont	2-1	29.43	6
4th	Silvery Airways	Joe Pickering	5-4f	29.55	5
5th	Northern Leader	Dave Geggus	16-1	29.79	1
6th	Yes James	J.Ward	20-1	00.00	4

Scurry Gold Cup, Clapton (Jul 26, 400y £600)
Pos	Name of Greyhound	Trainer	SP	Time	Trap
1st	Beware Champ	George Waterman	8-13f	22.71	1
2nd	Grove Champion	Tom Reilly	33-1	23.09	4
3rd	Recorded Course	Les Parry	5-1	23.25	6
4th	Lisronagh Duet	Tom Reilly	10-1	23.43	3
5th	Crazy Avenue	Gray	20-1	23.77	2
6th	Five Up	Ron Chamberlain	4-1	24.05	5

Laurels, Wimbledon (Aug 22, 500y, £1,000)
Pos	Name of Greyhound	Trainer	SP	Time	Trap
1st	Granthamaian	Jack Harvey	10-1	28.57	5
2nd	Lowerton Prince	Jack Harvey	5-1	28.61	6
3rd	Dangerous Customer	Dennis Hannafin	20-1	28.75	2
4th	Outside Left	Bob Burls	5-2	28.76	1
5th	Dancing Sheik	Ted Brennan	6-4f	28.88	4
6th	Lisronagh Duet	Tom Reilly	5-1	29.32	3

St Leger, Wembley (Sep 8, 700y, £1,000)
Pos	Name of Greyhound	Trainer	SP	Time	Trap
1st	Barrys Prince	Jack Harvey	4-1	40.01	4
2nd	Holystone Mischief	Jimmy Purnell	100-8	40.21	5
3rd	Beauepaire Reject	Jim Hookway	8-1	40.35	2
4th	Firgrove Steel	Ted Brennan	7-2	40.43	3
5th	Lough Champion	Joe Pickering	13-2	40.53	1
6th	Multiforbo	Bob Burls	5-4f	40.71	6

The Grand Prix Walthamstow (Sep 13, 525y, £600)
Pos	Name of Greyhound	Trainer	SP	Time	Trap
1st	Granthamian	Jack Harvey	1-1f	29.98	1
2nd	Crazy Drumloch	Bob Burls	8-1	30.02	4
3rd	Silvery Airways	Joe Pickering	100-8	30.14	2
4th	Shannon Gale	Tom Reilly	5-2	30.26	6
5th	Latest Step	Dave Geggus	8-1	30.32	3
6th	Lisronagh Duet	Tom Reilly	20-1	30.40	5

Oaks, White City (Sep 28, 525y, £500)
Pos	Name of Greyhound	Trainer	SP	Time	Trap
1st	Antarctica	Jimmy Jowett	7-2	29.12	6
2nd	Lovely Girl II	Ron Chamberlain	13-2	29.26	3
3rd	Kilcaskin Karmen	Johnny Bullock	5-2	29.27	5
4th	Split the Wind II	W.G.Brown	9-1	29.49	2
5th	Dail Road Blonde		100-7	29.59	4
6th	Duneaney Maid	Bob Burls	9-4f	29.69	1

Cesarewitch, West Ham (Oct 10, 600y, £1,000)
Pos	Name of Greyhound	Trainer	SP	Time	Trap
1st	Rylane Pleasure (dh)	Jack Harvey	3-1	33.06	2
1st	Pigalle Wonder (dh)	Jim Syder Jr.	8-11f	33.06	4
3rd	Lowerton Prince	Jack Harvey	9-2	33.18	1
4th	Dunmore Rocco	Dennis Hannafin	20-1	33.19	6
5th	Uncle Albert		66-1	33.43	3
6th	Sir Frederick	Jack Harvey	100-7	33.63	5

(dh) - dead heat

Welsh Derby, Arms Park (Oct 18, 525y £500)
Pos	Name of Greyhound	Trainer	SP	Time	Trap
1st	Our Defence	Dr Dennis O'Brien	6-1	30.27	3
2nd	Crazy Drumloch	Bob Burls	1-1f	30.37	6
3rd	Arrow Bridge	Bill Doolan	4-1	30.47	4
4th	Fearless Mac	Joe De Mulder	7-2	30.53	1
5th	Glenknockaun Boy		10-1	30.93	2
6th	Dunstown Prince		8-1	31.09	5

Inaugural BBC Sportsview Trophy Wimbledon (May 21, 500y)
Pos	Name of Greyhound	Trainer	SP	Time	Trap
1st	Town Prince	Leslie Reynolds	20-1	28.14	6
2nd	Dancing Sheik	Ted Brennan	7-1		3
3rd	More Talent	Bob Burls	5-1		4
4th	Pigalle Wonder	Jim Syder Jr.	1-4f		5
5th	Northern Lad	Bob Burls	7-2		2
6th	Wincot Clifford	Jack Toseland	100/8		1
