= 1949 English Greyhound Derby =

- Location: White City Stadium
- Start date: 11 June
- End date: 25 June
- Total prize money: £1,500 (winner)

The 1949 Greyhound Derby took place during June with the final being held on 25 June 1949 at White City Stadium. The winner Narrogar Ann received a first prize of £1,500.

== Final result ==
At White City (over 525 yards):

Position	Name of Greyhound	Breeding	Trap	SP	Time	Trainer
1st	Narrogar Ann	Dutton Swordfish - Winnie of Berrow	2	5-1	28.95	Leslie Reynolds (Wembley)
2nd	Dangerous Prince	Bella's Prince - Dark Evening	5	100-7	29.05	Ken Appleton (West Ham)
3rd	Sailing At Dawn	Shannon Shore - Bilting Antoinette	1	9-2	29.25	Sidney Probert (Wembley)
4th	Local Interprize	Ruby Border - Mythical Daisy	4	3-1	29.37	Stanley Biss (Clapton)
5th	Glencloy Regent	Glenview Shaggy - Little Twilight	3	9-4f	29.40	Mayor Baker (Wolverhampton)
6th	Saft Alex	Mad Tanist - Fair Light	6	11-2	30.20	Jack Toseland (Perry Barr)

=== Distances ===
1¼, 2½, 1½, neck, 10 (lengths)
The distances between the greyhounds are in finishing order and shown in lengths. From 1927-1950 one length was equal to 0.06 of one second but race times are shown as 0.08 as per modern day calculations.

== Review ==
Antepost favourites were Local Interprize 6-1 and Village Major 8-1. The new sensation from Ireland Ballymac Ball was the Greyhound Racing Association's and White City's big hope for victory. During the first round the 1948 English Greyhound Derby runner-up Local Interprize ran poorly and only finished in second place to Derrys Game. A British bred bitch called Narrogar Ann won easily by four lengths, Narrogar Ann had won the British Bred Produce Stakes in 1948 when trained by Joe Farrand at Oxford before switching to Derby winning trainer Leslie Reynolds. Ballymac Ball was a shock elimination and then aimed at the Laurels.

Saft Alex, the Puppy Derby and Midland Puppy Derby champion was the only race favourite to win during the second round. The heavily backed Whiterock Abbey lost out by one length to Narrogar Ann and Local Interprize struggled again going through by virtue of a third and final qualifying place in his heat.

The first semi-final contained the 7-4 favourite, West End Dasher, and he went out after first bend trouble which allowed Glencloy Regent to win the race from Local Interprize and Dangerous Prince. Sailing at Dawn justified favouritism in the second semi-final winning from Narrogar Ann and Saft Alex.

The final was wide open in regard to starting prices and the longest price available was the Grand National runner up Dangerous Prince at 100-7. The famous Derby final roar took place and from the start Dangerous Prince took a one length lead at the sectional placing, the lead increased as Saft Alex and Glencloy Regent were bumped at the first bend. Along the back straight Narrogar Ann began to make a move and took up second place from Sailing at Dawn. As the field came around the last bend Narrogar Ann edged in front and went on to win. She was only the second bitch in Derby history to take the title and the first to come from well behind the field in a final since the 1935 English Greyhound Derby (coincidentally the year that Greta Ranee became the first bitch to win). This was also a second success in three years for the British breeders. The winning owner and breeder, Mr William J Reid and trainer Leslie Reynolds (now a two time Derby winning trainer) were fortunate that Narrogar Ann came into season two days after the final because if it had been earlier she would not have been able to have competed.

== See also ==
1949 UK & Ireland Greyhound Racing Year
