= Westpark Mustard =

Famous British racing greyhound

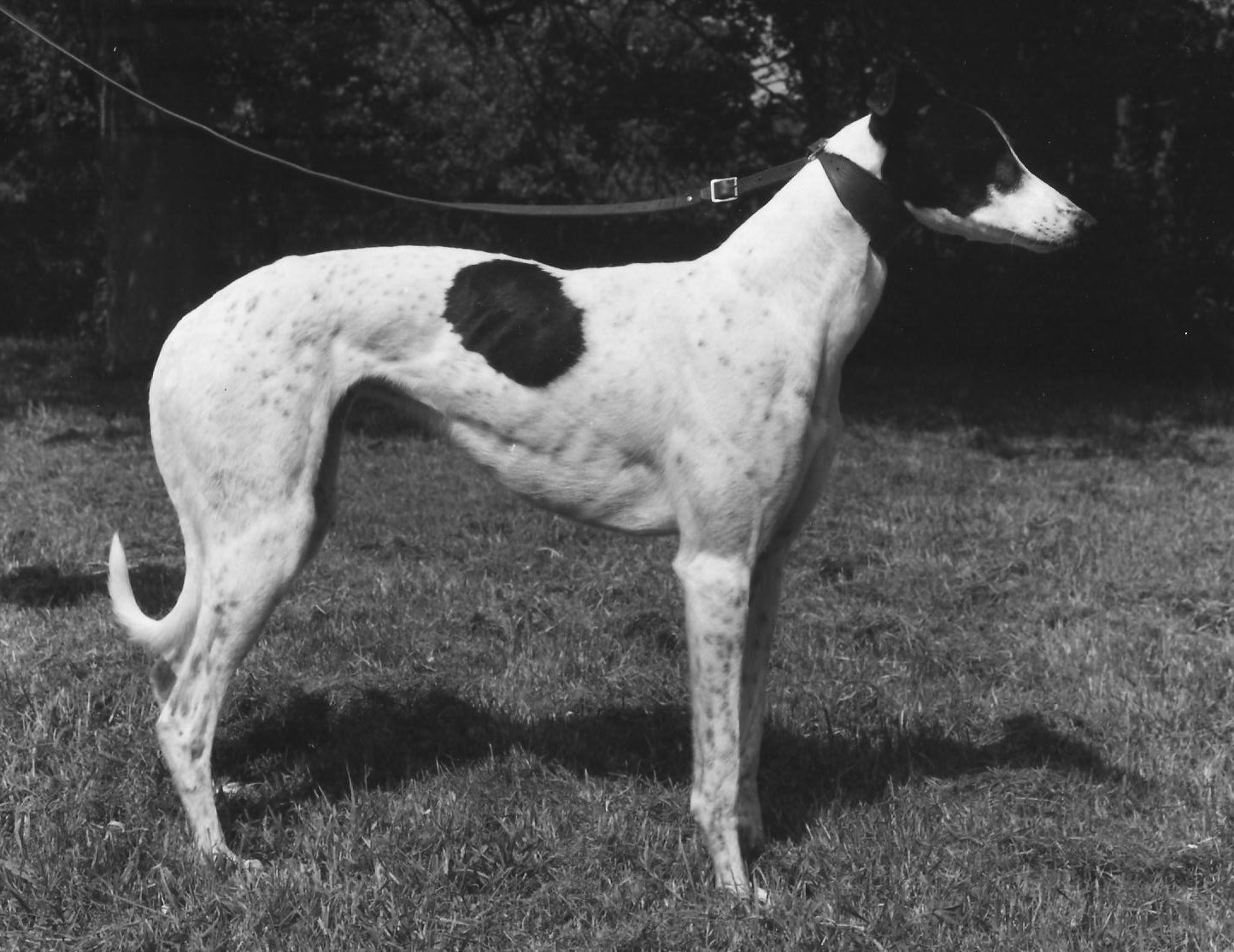
- Sire: Newdown Heather
- Dam: April Merry
- Sex: Bitch
- Whelped: July 1971
- Color: white and black
- Owner: Cyril Young (alias Cyril Scotland)
- Trainer: Tom Johnston Jr.

Record
- Longcross Cup; GRA Stakes

Awards
- British and European Record holder

Other awards
- 1974 Greyhound of the Year

Westpark Mustard was a white and black racing greyhound in the 1970s. By Newdown Heather out of April Merry, she broke the British and European record of 19 consecutive victories held by Mick the Miller, when recording a 20th consecutive win on 28 October 1974.

== Racing career ==
Westpark Mustard was entered for the 1973 English Greyhound Derby but the race distance was too short for her. She began to come to prominence over staying distances (longer distance races) and, on 7 January 1974, won the Abbey Cup at Wembley Stadium beating Myrtown by a head, the first win of the 20-race British and European record.

The run was extended to five wins after she won the Longcross Cup at White City Stadium in February. Trained by Tom Johnston Jr., the bitch won another ten races, including winning the GRA Stakes and setting a track record at Brough Park over 725 yards. She had captured the public's imagination, and with the winning sequence standing at 15 she broke into season on 12 May.

After seasonal rest, her connections entered her for several one-off open races, deciding to avoid the Gold Collar and Cesarewitch. Five open race wins secured the new British and European record feat of 20 successive victories, with the 20th win aptly named the Mick the Miller Record Stakes. The record consisted entirely of open races.

The winning sequence failed to extend past 20 wins following a series of unfortunate incidents that led to her being beaten at Shelbourne Park. Her owner, Cyril Young (who ran his greyhounds under the alias Cyril Scotland) was receiving criticism from the Scottish press for using an alias name, which upset him. Therefore, he decided to run the greyhound in Ireland. His trainer, Tom Johnston, had reservations about changing the greyhound routine, which proved true when Westpark Mustard failed to win her next race. To make matters worse, she was seriously ill after the race. After several more races, she was retired to stud with breeder Dave Murphy.

== British & European record ==
Date (All 1974)	Distance (yards)	Venue	Trap	Win distance (lengths)	Starting Price	Time	Race
Jan 7	525	Wembley	4	sh	4-1	29.77	Abbey Cup
Jan 18	700	Wembley	4	8 ½	4-7	40.58	Stadium Bookmakers Stakes
Jan 22	650	Romford	1	4 ½	4-9	36.62	Havering 600
Jan 31	725	White City	5	9	1-3	40.92	Longcross Cup heats
Feb 2	725	White City	6	6	4-11	41.03	Longcross Cup final
Feb 11	700	Wembley	1	10	8-13	41.27	Ivanhoe Stayers Cup
Feb 15	725	Harringay	5	7	1-4	41.46	February 725
Feb 23	800	White City	5	9 ¼	2-9	45.38	G.R.A Stakes heats
Mar 2	800	White City	4	9 ¼	1-5	44.93	G.R.A Stakes semis
Mar 9	800	White City	4	1 ¾	1-5	44.73	G.R.A Stakes final
Apr 8	700	Wembley	4	½	4-11	39.90	Stadium Bookmakers Stakes
Apr 23	550	Perry Barr	5	1	1-2	31.06	Bookmakers Stakes
Apr 27	725	Brough Park	5	4 ½	1-3	40.94 TR	Ladbroke 725
May 3	700	Wembley	4	7	4-11	39.86	Tyneside Stayers Stakes
May 7	700	Walthamstow	4	6	4-9	39.87	Grand Prix Trial Stakes
Sep 10	725	White City	6	7	2-9	40.29	Grantham Stakes
Sep 16	700	Wembley	3	9	1-10	39.96	Denver Stayers Cup
Oct 14	700	Wembley	5	13	1-4	39.68	Elite Stayers Cup
Oct 21	700	Wembley	5	16	1-10	39.71	National Inter Track
Oct 28	700	Wembley	5	5	1-14	39.66	Mick the Miller Record Stakes

== Pedigree ==
Hi There
Printer's Prince
Sally's Gossip
Newdown Heather
The Grand Champion
Pardee
Manhattan Heiress
Westpark Mustard
Champion Prince
Pigalle Wonder
Prairie Peg
April Merry
Man of Pleasure
Racing Millie
Millie's May
