= Cesarewitch (English greyhound race) =

British greyhound racing competition

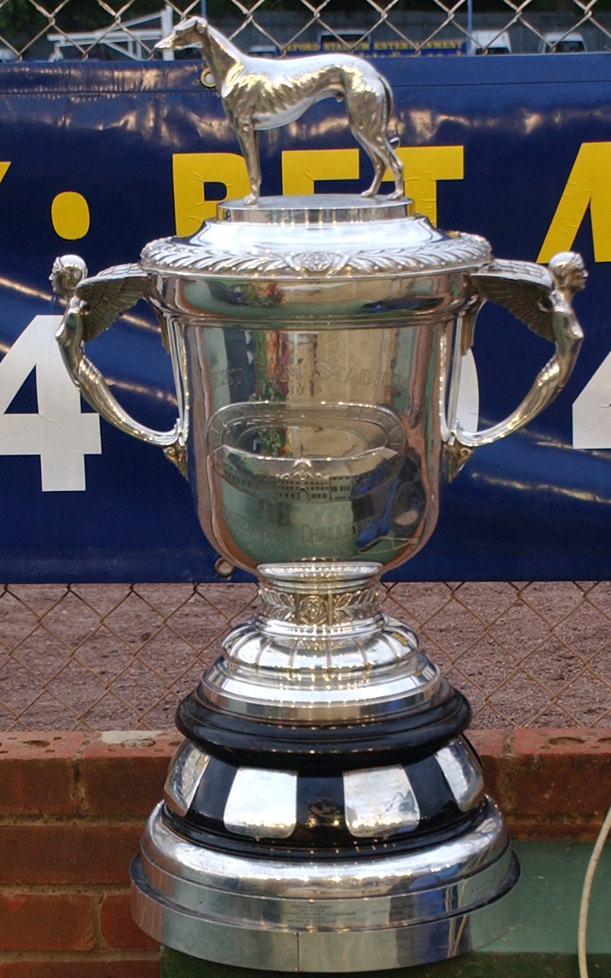
- Class: Category 1 (original classic)
- Location: Central Park Stadium
- Inaugurated: 1928
- Sponsor: Arena Racing Company

Race information
- Distance: 731 metres
- Surface: Sand
- Purse: £12,500 (to the winner)

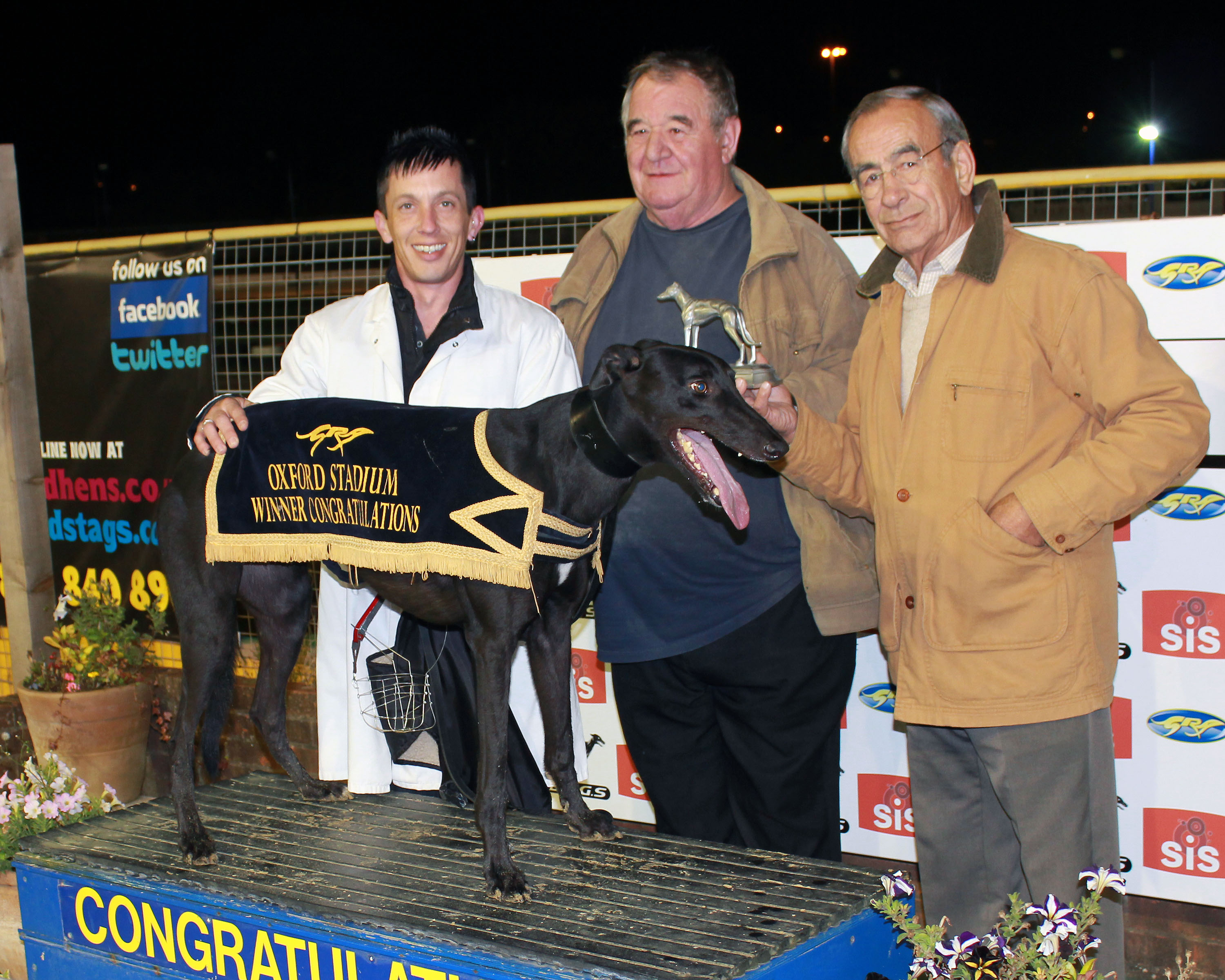
Droopys Xavier

The Cesarewitch is a greyhound racing competition held at Central Park Stadium. It was originally one of the classic races held in the British racing calendar and was inaugurated in 1928 and held at West Ham Stadium until its closure in 1972.

The event switched to Belle Vue Stadium until 1995 when it was transferred to Greyhound Racing Association (GRA) sister track Catford Stadium. The GRA closed Catford in 2000 and switched the Cesarewitch to their newly acquired track Oxford Stadium. The event ended following the closure of Oxford in 2012.

In 2020, the competition was brought back by Entain and was held at their stadia of Romford and Crayford and sponsored by the company's brand Ladbrokes Coral as a category 1 race, before switching to Central Park in 2023.

== Venues ==
- 1928–1971 (West Ham)
- 1972–1994 (Belle Vue)
- 1995–2000 (Catford)
- 2001–2012 (Oxford)
- 2019, 2021–2022 (Crayford)
- 2020–2020 (Romford)
- 2023–2026 (Central Park)

== Sponsors ==
- 1976–1978, 2020–2022 (Ladbrokes)
- 1979–1983 (Selwyn Demmy Bookmakers)
- 1984–1986 (Walmsley Brothers)
- 1987–1987 (Stadium Bookmakers)
- 1988–1989 (John Smith's Brewery)
- 1990–1991 (Webster's Yorkshire Bitter)
- 1992–1994 (Fosters)
- 1995–2000, 2002–2009 (William Hill)
- 2001–2001 (RD Racing Bookmakers)
- 2010–2011 (Tech Shop UK)
- 2012–2012 (Mick Lowe)
- 2019–2022 (Ladbrokes)
- 2023–2026 (Arena Racing Company)

== Past winners ==
Year	Winner	Breeding	Trainer	Dis	Time (sec)	SP	Notes/ref
1928	Dick's Son	Beaded Cock – Una II	Bill Fear (White City)	600y	34.38	6/4jf	
1929	Five of Hearts	Jamie – Fancy Girl V	Thomas Cudmore (Wembley)	600y	34.82	1/4f	
1930	Mick The Miller	Glorious Event – Na Boc Lei	Sidney Orton (Wimbledon)	600y	34.11	1/7f	
1931	Future Cutlet	Mutton Cutlet – Wary Guide	Sidney Probert (Wimbledon)	600y	34.03	10/11f	
1932	Future Cutlet	Mutton Cutlet – Wary Guide	Sidney Probert (Wimbledon)	600y	34.11	2/7f	
1933	Elsell	My Jim - Euphemia	William Dixon (White City)	600y	34.22	100/7	
1934	Brilliant Bob	Other Days – Birchfield Bessie	Sidney Orton (Wimbledon)	600y	33.80	9/2	
1935	Grand Flight II	Naughty Jack Horner – Little Fawn Biddy	Jim Syder Sr. (Wembley)	600y	33.97	33/1	
1936	Ataxy	Inler – Gosha Bead	Leslie Reynolds (White City)	550y	31.24	2/1	
1937	Jesmond Cutlet	Beef Cutlet – Lady Eleanor	Del Hawkesley (West Ham)	600y	34.56	11/4	
1938	Ballyjoker	Beef Cutlet – Jeanne Of Waterhall	Sidney Orton (Wimbledon)	600y	34.02	3/1	
1945	Hurry Kitty	Castledown Lade – Brilliant Gay	William Mills (Private)	550y	31.26	5/4f	
1946	Col Skookum	Keel Creamery – Cordial Choice	Sidney Orton (Wimbledon)	550y	31.28	4/1	
1947	Red Tan	Tanist – Double Classic	Tom Baldwin (Perry Barr)	550y	31.30	12/1	
1948	Local Interprize	Ruby Border – Mythical Daisy	Stan Biss (Clapton)	550y	30.88	11/4	
1949	Drumgoon Boy	Brainy Fellow – Merry Pearl	Frank Davis (Private)	550y	30.71	4/9f	
1950	Quare Customer	Mad Tanist – Queen Of Song	Leslie Reynolds (Wimbledon)	550y	30.80	11/10f	
1951	Prisona Luath	Bellas Prince – Miss Mona	Bob Burls (Wembley)	550y	33.77	10/11f	
1952	Shaggy Swank	Shaggy Lad – Local Swank	Tom Lightfoot (Private)	600y	34.03	5/1	
1953	Magourna Reject	Astras Son – Saucy Dame	Tommy 'Paddy' Reilly Walthamstow)	600y	33.24	1/4f	Track record
1954	Matchlock	Bellas Beech – Rose Of Cooleeney	Ted Brennan (Owlerton)	600y	33.03	7/2	
1955	Gulf of Darien	Imperial Dancer – Dorothy Ann	Jack Harvey (Wimbledon)	600y	32.99	4/6f	
1956	Coming Champion	Champion Prince – Capalata	Jim Syder Jr. (Wembley)	660y	33.02	9/2	
1957	Scoutbush	Baytown Coak – Creevy Lily	Bob Burls (Wembley)	600y	33.05	7/4f	
1958	Ryelane Pleasure	Man Of Pleasure – Knockrour Favourite	Jack Harvey (Wimbledon)	600y	33.06	3/1	dead-heat
1958	Pigalle Wonder	Champion Prince – Prairie Peg	Jim Syder Jr. (Wembley)	600y	33.06	8/11f	dead-heat
1959	Mile Bush Pride	The Grand Champion – Witching Dancerg	Jack Harvey (Wembley)	600y	32.66	2/7f	
1960	Rostown Genius	The Grand Genius – Rostown Lady	Joe Pickering (White City)	600y	33.29	2/1	
1961	Prairie Flash	Hi There – Prairie Peg	Jack Harvey (Wembley)	600y	32.91	9/4	
1962	Dromin Glory	Hi There- Dromin Jet	Johnny Bassett (Clapton)	600y	32.97	11/10f	Track record
1963	Jehu II	Demon King – Kings Lady	Gordon Hodson (White City)	600y	33.15	9/4	
1964	Clifden Orbit	The Grand Prince – Pink View	Tom Johnston Jr. (West Ham)	600y	33.08	4/1	
1965	Lucky Montforte	Hi There – Fairy Julia	Johnny Bassett (Private)	600y	33.00	5/1	
1966	Rostown Victor	Rostown Genius – British Queen	Tom Johnston Jr. (West Ham)	600y	34.06	66/1	
1967	Silver Hope	Clonalvy Pride – Mile Hawthorn	Paddy Keane (Clapton)	600y	32.99	2/1jf	
1968	Deen Valley	Lucky Wonder – Ardra Lassie	Paddy Keane (Clapton)	600y	33.29	4/5f	
1969	Cals Pick	Any Harm – Flying Cherry	Jack Harvey (Wembley)	600y	32.98	6/4jf	
1970	Gleneagle Comedy	Maryville Hi – Her Nibs	Jim Hookway (Owlerton)	600y	33.25	10/1	
1971	Whisper Billy	Crazy Society – My Goodness	Charlie Coyle (Private)	600y	33.45	50/1	
1972	Westmead Lane	Clonalvy Pride – Cricket Dancer	Nick Savva (Private)	880y	51.65	11/4	
1973	Country Maiden	Spectre – Lazy Pet	Frank Baldwin (Perry Barr)	880y	52.46	5/2	
1974	Westbrook Quinn	Myross Again – Abbey Holly	John Coulter (Private)	880y	52.17	7/2	
1975	Silver Sceptre	Maryville Hi - Trojan Major	Reg Young (Milton Keynes)	815m	52.31	4/1	
1976	Moy Summer	Skyhawk – Meronome	Harry Bamford (Belle Vue)	815m	51.32	16/1	
1977	Montrean	Moordyke Spot – Avondale	Harry Bamford (Belle Vue)	815m	51.64	4/6f	
1978	Sportland Blue	Baylough Jet – Real Proud	Harry Crapper (Owlerton)	815m	51.20	7/2	
1979	Roystons Supreme	Supreme Fun – Greenhill Fairy	Adam Jackson (Wembley)	815m	51.47	7/4	
1980	Linkside Liquor	Westmead Champ – Derby Liquor	Gordon Bailey (Yarmouth)	815m	51.22	3/1	
1981	Kinda Friendly	Friendly Spectre – Angel Eyes	Ernie Gaskin Sr. (Private)	815m	52.68	7/4f	
1982	Liga Lad	Law Lad – Jims Girl	David Vass (Private)	815m	51.83	6/4jf	
1983	Jos Gamble	Law Lad – Jims Girl	Jerry Fisher (Reading)	815m	50.90	5/2	
1984	Mobile Bank	Sand Man – Banks Best	Ernie Gaskin Sr. (Private)	815m	52.92	7/4f	
1985	Scurlogue Champ	Sand Man – Old Rip	George Drake (Private)	853m	54.62	1/3f	
1986	Yankees Shadow	Cosmic Sailor – Kings Lace	George Curtis (Brighton)	853m	54.90	4/7f	
1987	Role of Fame	Sand Man – Cashelmara	Arthur Hitch (Wimbledon)	853m	52.41	1/7f	
1988	Proud To Run	Mathews World – Run With Pride	Harry White (Canterbury)	853m	56.23	7/1	
1989	Minnies Siren	Easy And Slow – Fenmians Minnie	Kenny Linzell (Walthamstow)	853m	56.03	6/4f	
1990	Carlsberg Champ	Ballyregan Bob – Chocolate Satin	Barry Silkman (Private)	853m	55.50	5/4f	
1991	Wayzgoose	Manorville Major – Comeragh Larch	Dick Hawkes (Walthamstow)	853m	55.30	20/1	
1992	Zap	Murlens Slippy – Synons Crest	Alan Honeyfield (Perry Barr)	853m	55.44	12/1	
1993	Killenagh Dream	Dads Bank – Killenagh Lady	Charlie Lister (Doncaster)	853m	55.21	20/1	
1994	Sandollar Louie	Manorville Magic – I'm A Survivor	Kevin Connor (Canterbury)	853m	55.20	10/1	
1995	Ballarue Minx	Greenpark Fox – Ballarue Suzy	Bill Masters (Hove)	718m	45.98	5/4	
1996	Elbony Rose	Kildare Flash – Traffic Lights II	Nick Savva (Walthamstow)	718m	45.90	11/10f	
1997	Tralee Crazy	Ratify – Dennys Daisy	Nick Savva (Walthamstow)	718m	45.69	1/2f	
1998	Fourth Ace	Minnies Poacher – Ballygrooby	Barry Wileman (Perry Barr)	718m	47.01	9/4	
1999	Bubbly Prince	Frightful Flash – Kens Dilemma	Patsy Cusack (Crayford)	718m	45.90	4/6f	
2000	Lady Jean	Jacks Captain – Shades Of Sarah	Ken Tester (Crayford)	718m	45.63	11/8f	
2001	Solid Magic	Iceni Regent –Clodeen Magic	Brian Clemenson (Hove)	645m	39.72	11/10f	
2002	Cuba	Toms The Best – Lydpal Mary	Brian Clemenson (Hove)	645m	40.18	4/5f	
2003	Maxie Rumble	Smooth Rumble – Minnies Sparkler	Linda Mullins (Walthamstow)	645m	39.62	1/1f	
2004	Solid Money	Droopys Vieri – Town Band	Derek Knight (Hove)	645m	39.56	9/4	
2005	Zigzag Stewart	Droopys Vieri – Perrys Pusher	June McCombe (Belle Vue)	645m	39.61	3/1	
2006	Greenacre Lin	Top Honcho – First To Return	Brian Clemenson (Hove)	645m	39.85	11/10f	
2007	Dark Hondo	Hondo Black – Top Delivery	Paul Foster (Swindon)	645m	39.94	5/4f	
2008	Lenson Joker	Kiowa Sweet Trey - Free To Air	Tony Collett (Sittingbourne)	645m	39.22	10/11f	
2009	He Went Whoosh	Brett Lee – Arun Sky	Claude Gardiner (Hove)	645m	39.56	11/10f	
2010	Raving Black	Westmead Hawk – Droopys Britney	Seamus Cahill (Hove)	645m	39.30	4/1	
2011	Farloe Kraven	Hondo Black – Farloe Charity	Patrick Curtin (Monmore)	645m	40.16	8/1	dead-heat
2011	Westmead Palace	Droopys Scolari – Mega Delight	Graham Holford (Henlow)	645m	40.16	3/1	dead-heat
2012	Droopys Xavier	Ace Hi Rumble – Droopys Darjina	Claude Gardiner (Hove)	645m	40.09	6/1	
2019	Burgess Honey	Fernando Bale – Ballymac Salpa	Anthony Gifkins (Henlow)	645m	56.83	10/1	
2020	Aayamza Royale	Ballymac Eske – Ascot Lydia	Mark Wallis (Henlow)	925m	59.35	15/8jf	
2021	Salacres Pippy	Definate Opinion – Pippy	Peter Harnden (Towcester)	874m	56.56	5/2	venue change
2022	Savana Volcano	Confident Rankin – Volcano	Diane Henry (Towcester)	874m	56.04	2/1f	
2023	Cochise	Droopys Sydney – Lemon Stacey	Richard Rees (Hove)	708m	44.96	5/1	venue change
2024	Garfiney Blaze	Ballymac Anton – Ballymac Merkle	Mark Wallis (Suffolk Downs)	731m	44.05	4/6f	Track record
2025	Garfiney Blaze	Ballymac Anton – Ballymac Merkle	Mark Wallis (Suffolk Downs)	731m	44.75	13/8	
2026	Mongys Wild	Roxholme Olaf – Banter Breeze	Mark Wallis (Private)	731m	43.64	1/4f	Track record

== Gallery ==
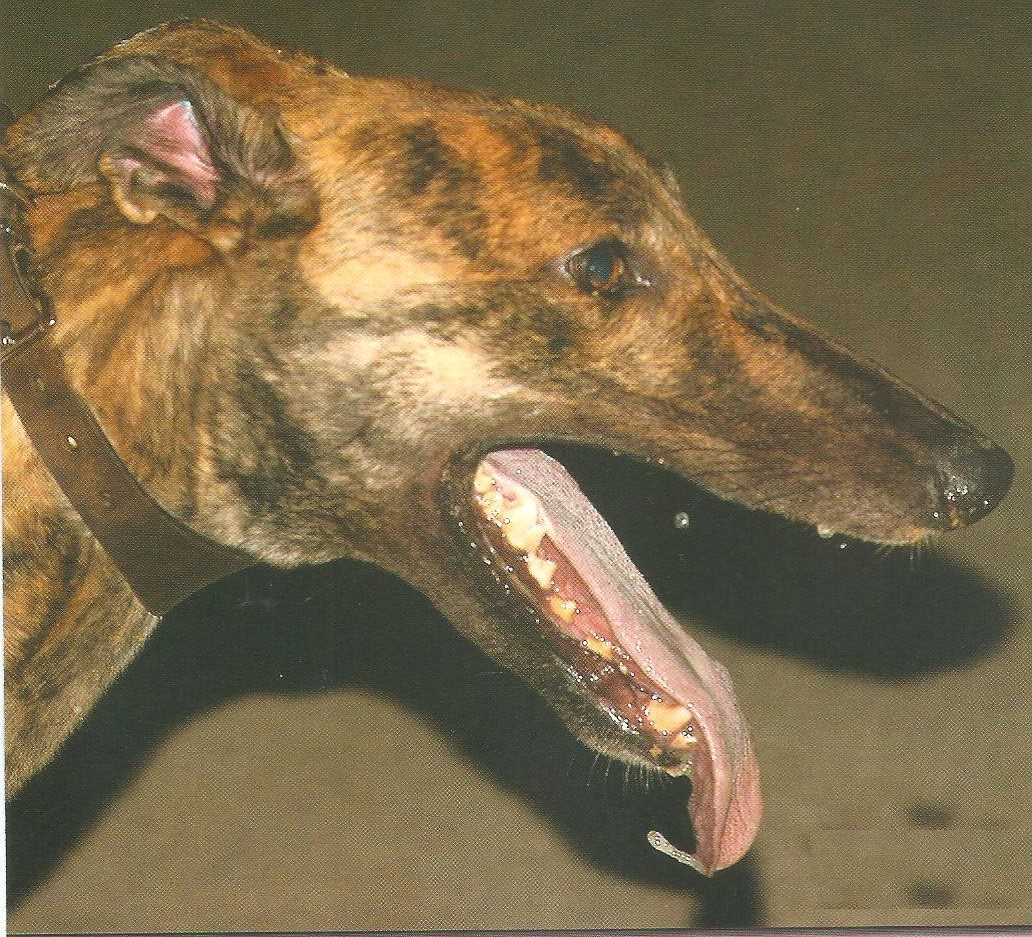
Maxie Rumble 2003 champion

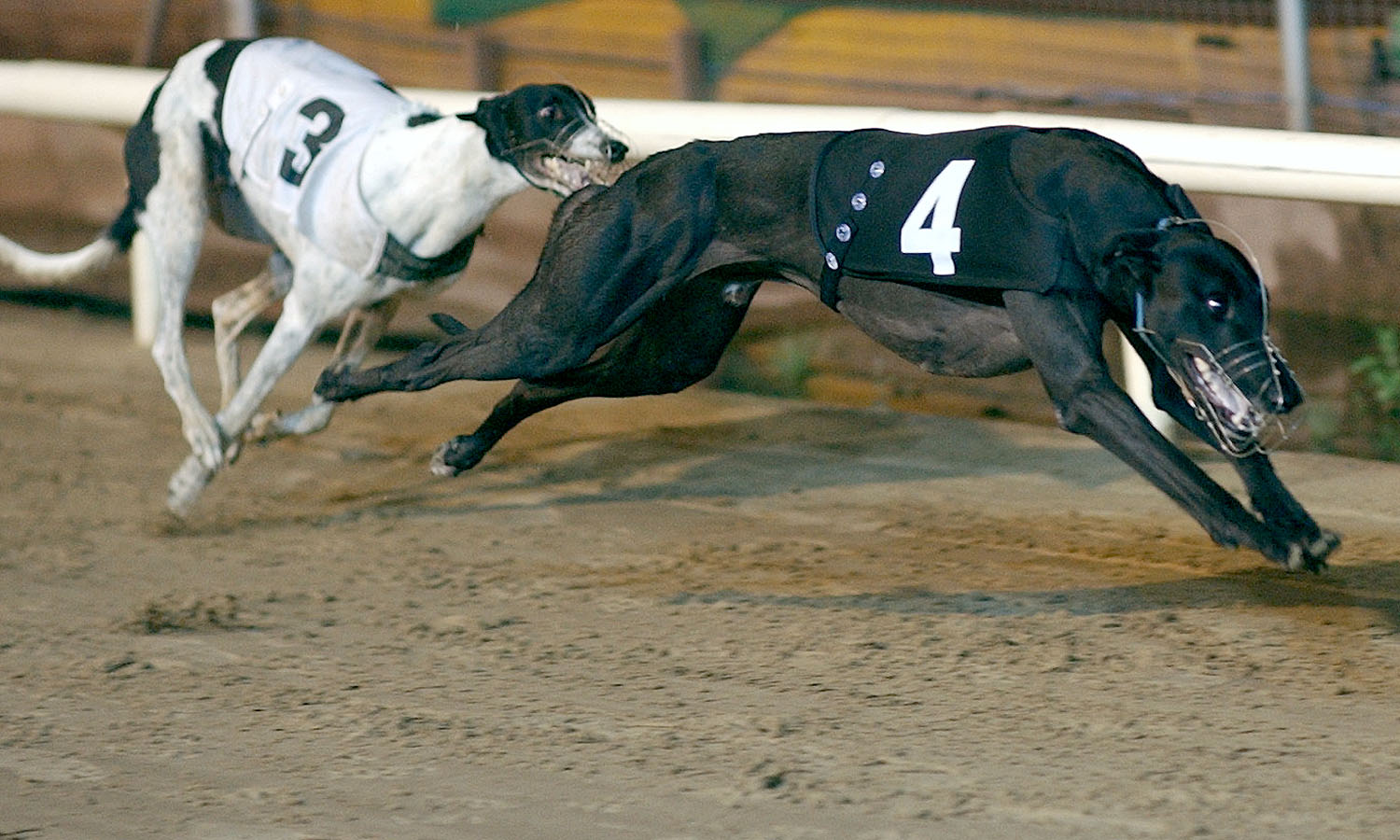
Solid Money (trap 3) and Black Pear (trap 4) in the 2004 Cesarewitch heats
