= 1960 Irish Greyhound Derby =

- Venue: Shelbourne Park
- Location: Dublin
- End date: 13 August
- Total prize money: £1,000 (winner)

The 1960 Irish Greyhound Derby took place during July and August with the final being held at Shelbourne Park in Dublin on 13 August 1960.

The winner Perrys Apple won £1,000 and was owned and trained by Paddy Behan and bred by Charlie Weld.

== Final result ==
At Shelbourne, 13 August (over 525 yards):

Position	Name of Greyhound	Breeding	Trap	SP	Time	Trainer
1st	Perrys Apple	Only Perry - Ryans Demon	2	7-2	29.55	Paddy Behan
2nd	The Black Ranger	Imperial Airways - New Law	1		30.03	
3rd	Kilmoney Tulip	unknown	3			Gay McKenna
unplaced	Eccentric Sam	unknown	5			Tom Harty
unplaced	Edenderry Princess	Champion Prince - Down the Bank	6			
unplaced	Pigalle Wonder	Champion Prince - Prairie Peg	4			Jim Syder Jr.

=== Distances ===
6 (lengths)

== Competition report ==
The prize money for the 1960 Irish Derby final would once again rise to £1,000. The Dublin tracks had introduced tote betting which enabled the increase to be implemented. English entries had been sparse over the previous years and the increase contributed to the decision of some leading English connections to travel over including the legendary Pigalle Wonder. A record 96 greyhounds lined up for the event and the first round provided the usual selection of shocks that included English stars Faithful Charlie trained by Jim Irving and Joe DeMulder's Fearless Mac.

Pigalle Wonder won two rounds before losing in round three but qualifying for the semi-finals without incident, another leading English greyhound and Pigalle Wonder's kennelmate Long Story had clocked the fastest time to also make the semis.

The first semi-final resulted in Perrys Apple defeating Pigalle Wonder with The Black Ranger a distant third place. The second qualifier went to 33-1 shot Eccentric Sam from Edenderry Princess and Kilmoney Tulip. Long Story had found serious trouble and failed to make the final.

On the evening of the final Perrys Apple ran the perfect race leading all the way and ran out an easy winner from The Black Ranger. Pigalle Wonder trailed in last after encountering significant trouble.

After the event the champion Perrys Apple and two finalists Eccentric Sam and Kilmoney Tulip all found themselves at auction hoping to attract buyers from England. Remarkably all three failed to meet their reserves, the champion Perrys Apple only attracted a 750 guineas on a reserve of £2,250. Meanwhile, Pigalle Wonder now aged four and a half years old was retired and he served nearly ten years at stud, during which time his influence on greyhound racing was to prove considerable.

== See also ==
- 1960 UK & Ireland Greyhound Racing Year
