= 1958 Irish Greyhound Derby =

- Venue: Shelbourne Park
- Location: Dublin
- End date: 9 August
- Total prize money: £500 (winner)

The 1958 Irish Greyhound Derby took place during July and August with the final being held at Shelbourne Park in Dublin on 9 August 1958.

The winner Colonel Perry won £500 and was trained by Jack Nallen and owned by Mrs Olive Tasker. After his victory a street was named after him in the centre of Edenderry.

== Final result ==
At Shelbourne, 9 August (over 525 yards):

Position	Name of Greyhound	Breeding	Trap	SP	Time	Trainer
1st	Colonel Perry	Olly's Quare Rebel - Ashgrove Breeze		5-4f	29.79	Jack Nallen
2nd	Daring Customer	Champion Prince - Daring Angel			29.85	Malachy McKenna
3rd	Moorbrook Airmouse	Imperial Airways - Moorbrook Nell			29.89	DeMulder
unplaced	The Grand Duchess	The Grand Champion - Quare Fire				Paddy Dunphy
unplaced	Super Scope	unknown				
unplaced	Knockavilla	The Grand Champion - Hell For Leather				

=== Distances ===
¾, ½ (lengths)

== Competition Report ==
A greyhound called Colonel Perry was owned by Larry Cribbin from Edenderry, and trained by his brother-in-law Jack Nallen. After reaching the final of the Easter Cup he was rested before the start of the 1958 Derby. In the opening round Colonel Perry recorded a 29.62 win, the fastest of the round and then he repeated the feat by winning his second round heat in a fastest of the round 29.55. The other second round winners were Dashing Miller (29.56), The Grand Duchess (29.64), Moorbrook Airmouse (29.79) and Lakefield Rambler (29.95).

After the second round the black dog was sold by Cribbin to Mrs Olive Tasker from Birmingham for £1,500. In the semi-finals Colonel Perry was beaten by Daring Customer in 29.59 but he held off Lunar Flight for second place and therefore securing a place on the final. The remaining semi-finals saw Moorbrook Airmouse defeat Knockavilla and The Grand Duchess beat Super Scope.

A stroke of luck led to Colonel Perry winning the final, when the traps opened he stumbled into Daring Customer who in turn moved into the path of the other runners. Colonel Perry then drew clear and held on for victory from the fast finishing Daring Customer.

== See also ==
1958 UK & Ireland Greyhound Racing Year
