= Adam Jackson (greyhound trainer) =

Irish greyhound trainer

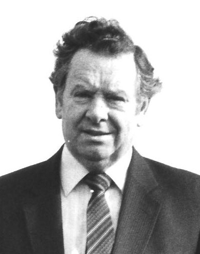

Personal information
- Born: 31 May 1929 Ballymore Eustace, Ireland
- Died: 28 October 1989 (aged 60) Harlow, Essex, England
- Occupation: Greyhound trainer

Sport
- Sport: Greyhound racing

Achievements and titles
- National finals: Derby wins: English Derby (1965, 1971); Scottish Derby (1971), (1973); Welsh Derby (1969, 1971); Classic/Feature wins: St Leger (1982, 1983); Cesarewitch (1979); Oaks (1982); Grand Prix (1982)

Adam Christopher Jackson (31 May 1929 – 28 October 1989), was an Irish born Greyhound trainer. He was the 1982 UK trainer of the year and also won the 1982 Trainers' championship.

== Career ==
Jackson moved to England from Ireland and gained a position as a kennelhand for Paddy McEvoy in 1953 (who was employed by the Greyhound Racing Association at the time). He secured his own trainer's licence in 1959 and was attached to Slough Stadium, replacing Jack Kinsley who had moved to Wembley.

He was transferred to Clapton Stadium in 1963 and trained out of the Claverhambury Kennels (no 6) in Waltham Abbey. The move catapulted his career and he gained great success.

In 1965 he won the 1965 English Greyhound Derby with Chittering Clapton. Pallas Joy won the 1969 Welsh Greyhound Derby before Jackson was given a greyhound called Patricias Hope to train. The white and fawn dog became an all-time great and provided Jackson with a second English Derby triumph and won the elusive Triple Crown in 1972. The triple crown consisted of both the Welsh Derby and Scottish Derby victories, in addition to the English Derby win.

He won a second Scottish Greyhound Derby with Dashalong Chief in 1973 before moving to White City following the sale of Clapton to the Greyhound Racing Association. During 1982 he won the Trainer's Championship and switched from White City to Wembley.

== Awards ==
Despite being Irish born he was voted the United Kingdom Greyhound Trainer of the Year in 1982.

== Personal life ==
He was born in Ireland on 31 May 1929 in Ballymore Eustace, the youngest of five children. He contracted Polio at the age of 18 and after taking two years to recover was left with a limp throughout his life. He worked a series of odd jobs before emigrating to England in 1953. He died from cancer during 1989.
