= Sherrys Prince =

British racing greyhound

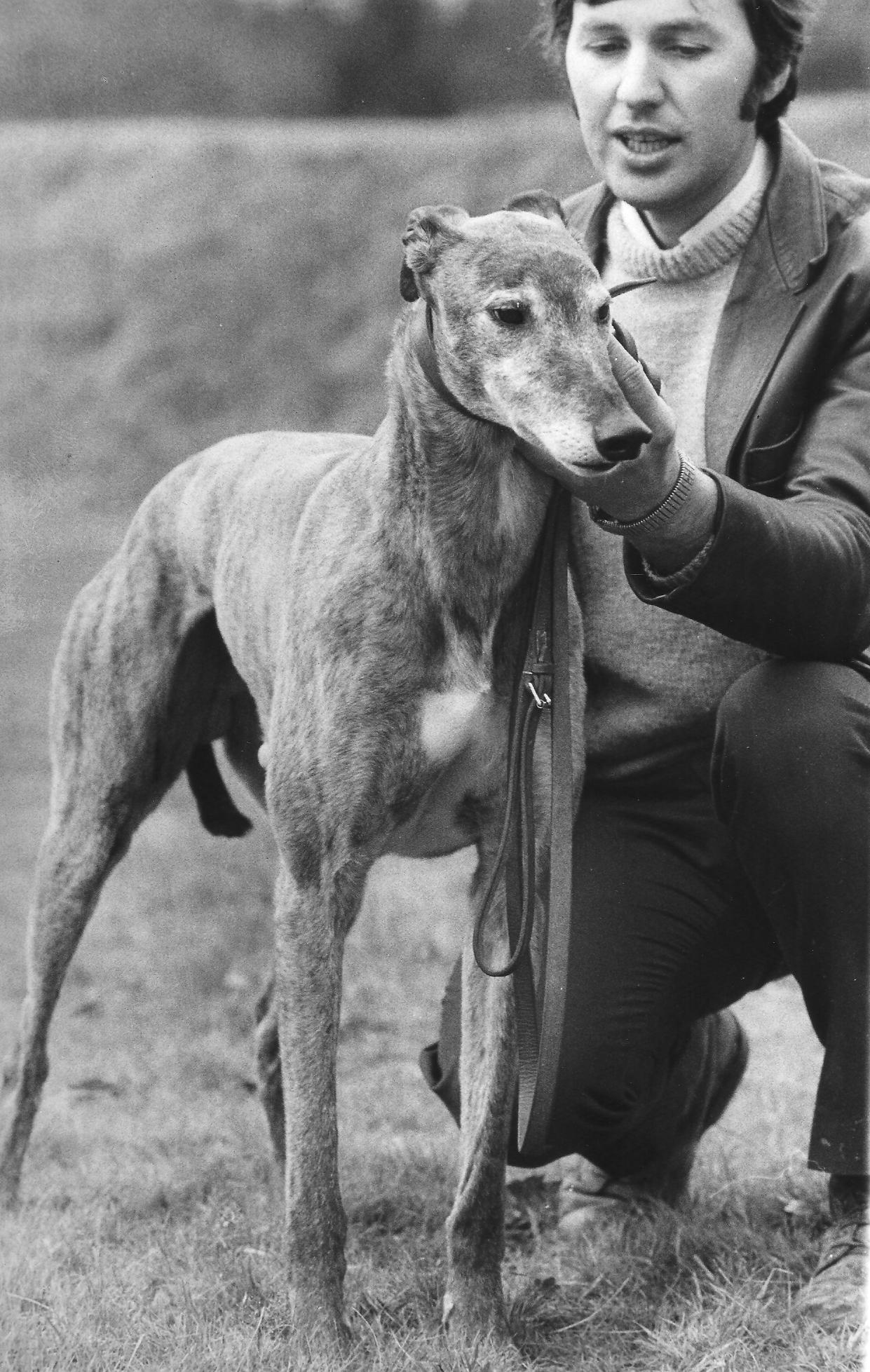
- Sherrys Prince with trainer Colin West
- Sire: Mad Era
- Dam: Nevasca
- Sex: Dog
- Whelped: April 1967
- Died: 1978 (aged 10–11)
- Color: Brindle
- Breeder: Nora Kennedy
- Owner: Joyce Matthews
- Trainer: John Shevlin & Colin West

Record
- Grand National (1970), (1971), (1972); Wimbledon Gold Cup (1971)

Sherrys Prince was a racing greyhound during the late 1960s and early 1970s. He was three times winner of the Grand National and is considered the greatest hurdler of all time.

== Early life ==
He was whelped in April 1967, by Mad Era out of Nevasca, owned by Joyce Matthews and trained out of West Ham Stadium by John Shevlin. The kennelhand was Irene Hazelwood later (McNally).

== Racing career ==
=== 1969 ===
His last race on the flat was 9 May 1969 at New Cross Stadium before being schooled for hurdles by Shevlin at West Ham Stadium. He came to prominence after setting new hurdle track records at White City and Wembley.

=== 1970 ===
Sherry's Prince dominated the 1970 Grand National at White City, winning his heat and semi-final before winning the final on 18 April. He also won the Long Hop Hurdles at the same track during April. Unfortunately, he broke a hock when finishing runner-up in the Scottish Grand National final, at Powderhall over 500 yards hurdles.

By October he had recovered and had returned to racing, but his trainer John Shevlin's health was failing at the time. Shevlin died which resulted in his West Ham kennel being allocated to Colin West with McNally remaining to help the kennel.

=== 1971 ===
The brindle won the New Year Hurdles at Wembley but was defeated by Derry Palm in the Supreme Hurdles Champion Stakes over 525 yards at White City. In April he then equalled the record of Juvenile Classic and Blossom of Annagura, by winning a second Grand National title. He once again went unbeaten throughout the 1971 edition. The success included two track records in the heats and semi-finals. He later set a world record in the final of the Wimbledon Gold Cup when recording 28.83 seconds.

On 15 September 1971 at Hall Green Stadium, Prince recorded his 11th track record to date and broke the record again on 2 October, when winning the Midland Grand National.

=== 1972 ===
He won the Cobb Marathon hurdles on 5 February 1972, setting a new track record of 35.75 before being struck with a kidney infection. However, by April he had recovered and then rewrote the record books by becoming the first greyhound to win a third Grand National. The record was even more significant because he went unbeaten again for the third successive time.

He retired after running in 105 hurdle races, winning 70 and finishing runner-up 15 times, in addition to setting 15 track records. He died in 1978.

== Selected track records ==
Date	Venue	Time	Distance	Notes/Ref
16 October 1969	White City	30.62	550	
20 October 1969	Wembley	29.81	525	
April 1971	White City	29.26	525	
April 1971	White City	29.20	525	
1971	Wimbledon	28.38	???	
8 May 1971	White City	29.10	525	
15 September 1971	Hall Green	28.60	500	
2 October 1971	Hall Green	28.38	500	Midland Grand National
2 November 1971	Catford	24.39	420	
5 February 1972	Catford	35.75	610	
1972	West Ham	30.89	550	
1972	Harringay	29.02	525	

== Pedigree ==
Slaney Record
Hi There
Dublin Red
Mad Era
Mad Tanist
Drumloch Sheevaun
Sheevaun
Sherrys Prince
Champion Prince
The Grand Canal
The Grand Duchess
Nevasca
Keep Moving
Shangri
Hopalong Olly
