= 1948 English Greyhound Derby =

Greyhound racing event

- Location: White City Stadium
- Start date: 12 June
- End date: 26 June
- Total prize money: £1,500 (winner)

The 1948 Greyhound Derby took place during June with the final being held on 26 June 1948 at White City Stadium. The winner, Priceless Border, received a first prize of £1,500.

== Final result ==
At White City (over 525 yards):

Position	Name of Greyhound	Breeding	Trap	SP	Time (sec)	Trainer
1st	Priceless Border	Clonahard Border - Priceless Sandills	1	1/2f	28.78	Leslie Reynolds (Wembley)
2nd	Local Interprize	Ruby Border - Mythical Daisy	5	6/1	28.94	Stan Biss (Clapton)
3rd	Sheevaun	Bella's Prince - Honey Gale	3	9/2	29.10	Paddy Fortune (Wimbledon)
4th	Doughery Boy	Farloe Cutlet - Hylton Black Out	6	100/8	29.26	Jonathan Hopkins (Walthamstow)
5th	Rathattan Ben	Strange Lad - Rathattan Lass	4	100/1	29.29	Jim Syder Jr. (Wembley)
6th	Baytown Stork	Baytown Tulip - Ulster Row	2	100/1	29.41	Jack Toseland (Perry Barr)

=== Distances ===
2, 2, 2, neck, 1½ (lengths)
The distances between the greyhounds are in finishing order and shown in lengths. From 1927-1950 one length was equal to 0.06 of one second but race times are shown as 0.08 as per modern day calculations.

== Review ==
Priceless Border was a short ante post favourite at odds of 5-1, the brindle dog had been unlucky during the 1947 English Greyhound Derby and had already won the Wood Lane Stakes at White City. In the heats he broke his own track record with a 28.64 win. Another favourite Local Interprize missed the break in his heat and failed to pick up the leader Mazurka in a slow time of 29.24, but still qualified. Other notable first round winners who dipped under the 29 second barrier were Cheerful Comedy 28.95 and Don Gipsey 28.98.

One of the semi-finals paired Priceless Border, owned by ten year old Desmond O'Kane, with Local Interprize and the former ran out a three length winner in 28.76. In the next semi-final, the Longcross Cup champion Sheevaun impressed with a time of 28.74 around the 525 yard circuit and the remaining semi-final was won by Doughery Lad in 29.23.

Priceless Border drew trap one in the final and he trapped in front when the race got underway, he always led to finish two lengths clear of the field in a fast time of 28.78, Local Interprize ran well to stay only two lengths adrift, also breaking 29 seconds.

== See also ==
1948 UK & Ireland Greyhound Racing Year
