= Jim Syder Jr. =

British greyhound racing professional trainer

Personal information
- Born: 6 August 1911 Edmonton, England
- Died: 1972 (aged 60–61) Dublin, Ireland
- Occupation: Greyhound trainer

Sport
- Sport: Greyhound racing

Achievements and titles
- National finals: Derby wins: Engliash Derby (1958); Classic/Feature wins: Cesarewitch (1956, 1958); Gold Collar (1955); Pall Mall Stakes (1958)

Jim Manoel Syder Jr. (6 August 1911 – 1972) was an English greyhound trainer. He achieved the highest training accolade when winning the English Greyhound Derby.

== Early life ==
Born in the Edmonton area during 1911, he started work as a kennelhand for his father, Jim Syder Sr. at Wembley in 1930.

== Career ==
In 1936 he took out his first trainers licence at Southend Stadium but he only stayed 10 months, before returning to work for his father at Wembley as the Assistant Trainer. They resided at Horsenden Farm (now a tourist attraction) in Greenford and later London Road, in St Albans but trained out of the Wembley Kennels.

In 1945 his father died which resulted in Syder Jr taking the licence at Wembley. With a strong kennel and many owners, success was inevitable and he trained the runner up in the 1946 Grand Prix before winning the 1946 St Leger with Bohernagraga Boy.

In 1948 he reached the 1948 English Greyhound Derby final with Rathattan Ben. Six year later he trained Leafy Ash who finished runner-up in the 1954 English Greyhound Derby.

His first classic success came in 1955 when Firgrove Slipper won the Gold Collar. In 1956 he won the Cesarewitch with Coming Champion before he achieved his greatest successes during 1958. A greyhound called Pigalle Wonder won the 1958 English Greyhound Derby and 1958 Cesarewitch for him.

In 1960 he left Wembley to train privately before moving to Ireland. He reached two Irish Derby finals, the 1960 Irish Greyhound Derby and the 1962 Irish Greyhound Derby.

== Death ==
He contracted lung cancer in 1970 and died in 1972, in Dublin, bequeathing his body to medical science.
