= 1958 English Greyhound Derby =

- Location: White City Stadium
- Start date: 14 June
- End date: 28 June
- Total prize money: £1,500 (winner)

The 1958 Greyhound Derby took place during June with the final being held on 28 June 1958 at White City Stadium. The winner was Pigalle Wonder and the winning owner Al Burnett received £1,500.

== Final result ==
At White City (over 525 yards):

Position	Name of Greyhound	Breeding	Trap	SP	Time	Trainer
1st	Pigalle Wonder	Champion Prince - Prairie Peg	1	4-5f	28.65	Jim Syder Jr. (Wembley)
2nd	Northern Lad	Champion Prince - Choice Beauty	5	25-1	28.83	Bob Burls (Wembley)
3rd	Mile Bush Pride	The Grand Champion - Witching Dancer	3	5-2	28.86	Jack Harvey (Wembley)
4th	Gentle Touch	Magourna Reject - Abbey Jane	4	100-6	29.16	Dennis Hannafin (Wimbledon)
5th	Simmer Down Pal	Ollys Pal - Ballygortagh Girl	2	50-1	29.54	Joe Booth (Private)
6th	Outside Left	Demon King - Gilera	6	6-1	29.62	Bob Burls (Wembley)

=== Distances ===
2¾, Neck, 4, 4¾, 1 (lengths)
The distances between the greyhounds are in finishing order and shown in lengths. From 1950 one length was equal to 0.08 of one second.

== Competition Report ==
Two brindle dogs called Pigalle Wonder and Mile Bush Pride were heavily involved in the 1958 Derby and would become famous names within the sport of greyhound racing. Pigalle Wonder started his career called Prairie Champion and won the 1957 McCalmont Cup at Kilkenny Greyhound Stadium. He was bought by Al Burnett (owner of the Pigalle Club in London) after clocking 29.10 sec in a 525 yards trial at Harold's Cross Stadium and was renamed Pigalle Wonder. However in the first round he suffered a shock defeat. This defeat led to the bookmakers making Kilcaskin Kern the new Derby favourite, this fawn dog had finished the previous year well and broke the track record in his heat recording 28.63.

Mile Bush Pride had been bought for the Derby by Jack Harvey for Noel Purvis but suffered a minor setback when a corn had to be removed from his foot shortly before the first round which he safely negotiated. The second round brought mixed fortunes for the main contenders, Kilcaskin Kern won but finished lame after the race. Pigalle Wonder and Mile Bush Pride progressed comfortably.

In the semi-finals Kilcaskin Kern was declared fit but failed to progress any further. Mile Bush Pride clipped three spots off the track record set by Kilcaskin Kern before Pigalle Wonder won by 13 lengths, in 28.44, breaking the record once again in the second semi-final.

The Wembley trainers once again dominated proceedings with four finalists, Bob Burls handled two of them, the first time he had trained a Derby finalist. The draw was unkind to Mile Bush Pride and trap one further enhanced the chances of Pigalle Wonder who went off at 4-5 favourite. Northern Lad made the best start and led until the third bend but Pigalle Wonder always in close pursuit took over the lead at that point and drew clear to win by over two lengths. Mile Bush Pride ran on well for third place despite his bad trap draw.

== See also ==
1958 UK & Ireland Greyhound Racing Year
