= Tom Johnston (greyhound trainer) =

British greyhound racing professional trainer (1933-2001

Tom Johnston Jr.
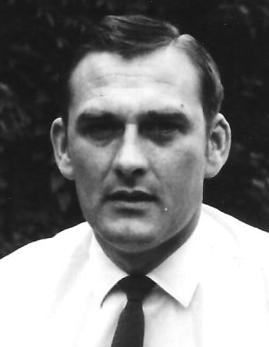

Personal information
- Born: 5 February 1933
- Died: 20 October 2001 (aged 68)
- Occupation: Greyhound trainer

Horse racing career
- Sport: Greyhound racing

Achievements and titles
- National finals: Derby wins: Scottish Derby (1963, 1964); Classic/Feature wins: Cesarewitch (1964, 1966); Oaks (1974, 1978); St Leger (1979); Gold Collar (1963)

Thomas Johnston Jr. (5 February 1933 – 20 October 2001) was a British greyhound trainer. He was twice UK Champion trainer in 1963 and 1972.

== Biography ==
Johnston's kennels were based at Stilliters Farm on Moulsoe Road in Cranfield, Bedfordshire. In 1963 he took over the kennels after moving from Scotland. His father Tom Johnston Sr. was the winning trainer of the 1928 English Greyhound Derby) and trained greyhounds on the coursing fields for Robert Jardine many years before oval track racing arrived to the United Kingdom.

Johnston was a leading trainer for over a decade during the 1960s and 1970s and won the Scottish Greyhound Derby in 1963 and 1964. He ran out of West Ham Stadium until 1969 before joining Wembley Stadium where he trained until his retirement.

He trained Westpark Mustard who broke the British and European record by winning twenty consecutive races in 1974.

He died in 2001 aged 68.
