= Jim Hookway =

British greyhound racing professional trainer

Personal information
- Born: September 2, 1917 Ecclesall, England
- Died: October 24, 1982 Sheffield, England
- Occupation: Greyhound Trainer

Sport
- Sport: Greyhound racing

Achievements and titles
- National finals: Derby wins: English Derby (1967); Scottish Derby (1965); Classic/Feature wins: Cesarewitch (1970)

Ronald James Hookway (2 September 1917 – 24 October 1982) was a United Kingdom greyhound trainer. He was the UK champion trainer in 1965 and 1967.

== Profile ==
Jim Hookway trained at Owlerton Stadium in Sheffield. His first significant feat was reaching the 1954 Oaks final with Rimmells Pearl. In 1955 he then trained St Leger and Cesarewitch finalists.

His first major classic success came in 1965, when he won the Scottish Greyhound Derby; securing a 1-2 finish with Clonmannon Flash and O'Leary.

Hookway became Trainer of the Year in 1965 and 1967 and won the sports ultimate accolade when winning the 1967 English Greyhound Derby with Tric-Trac. Spectre II finished runner-up in the same final and won the BBC Sportsview Television Trophy.

He later won the 1970 Cesarewitch and also won three All England Cups.

== Personal life ==
Before the Second World War he was a Wire Scourer. He married Winifred Innocent in 1949.
