= Pigalle Wonder =

Racing greyhound

- Sire: Champion Prince
- Dam: Prairie Peg
- Sex: Dog
- Whelped: March 1956
- Died: January 1969 (aged 12)
- Color: Brindle
- Breeder: Tom Murphy
- Owner: Al Burnett
- Trainer: Jim Syder Jr.

Record
- English Greyhound Derby; Cesarewitch; Pall Mall; Edinburgh Cup x 2 Anglo-Irish International; McCalmont Cup; Wood Lane Stakes

Honours
- 1958 Greyhound of the Year

Pigalle Wonder was a racing greyhound during the late 1950s and early 1960s. He was the United Kingdom Greyhound of the Year and won the sports top accolade by winning the 1958 English Greyhound Derby.

== 1956 ==
He was whelped in March 1956 and bred by Tom Murphy in County Kilkenny, and was reared under the name Prairie Champion.

== 1957 ==
His first race was on 10 October 1957, when he participated in the McCalmont Cup at Kilkenny under the name of Prairie Champion. He won his heat by ten lengths in 29.80 seconds and then won the final. After recording 29.10 seconds in a 525 yards trial at Harold's Cross Stadium he was bought by Al Burnett, who was known for owning the Pigalle Club in London.

== 1958 ==
He was subsequently renamed Pigalle Wonder and was moved to Jim Syder Jr. as his trainer at Wembley. After being defeated in the inaugural BBC Sportsview TV Trophy at odds of 1-4f, he won the 1958 Derby in fine style setting a track record on the way to winning the event.

During 1958, he also won the Pall Mall Stakes at Harringay Stadium, the Edinburgh Cup and the Cesarewitch (dead-heat), which culminated in him being voted the Greyhound of the Year.

== 1959 ==
During 1959 he won the Anglo-Irish International, the Wood Lane Stakes and successfully defended his Edinburgh Cup title.

== 1960 ==
He failed in the first round of the 1960 English Greyhound Derby before reaching the final of the 1960 Irish Greyhound Derby at Shelbourne Park

== Retirement ==
Burnett sold Pigalle Wonder to stud during 1963 and he became a successful sire, with offspring that included Wonder Valley, Shady Begonia, Russian Gun. He died during January 1969.

== Pedigree ==
Castledown Lad
Bella's Prince
Bella's Witch
Champion Prince
Swanky Jog
Sally Well
Lucy Lilla
Pigalle Wonder
Mad Tanist
The Grand Champion
Could Be Worse
Prairie Peg
Astra's Son
Prairie Vixen
Take Murex
