= Wembley Greyhounds =

Greyhound racing operation in London, England

- Location: Wembley Stadium, London
- Coordinates: 51°33′20.0″N 0°16′46.8″W
- Opened: 1927
- Closed: 1998

Wembley Greyhounds was the greyhound racing operation held at Wembley Stadium in London.

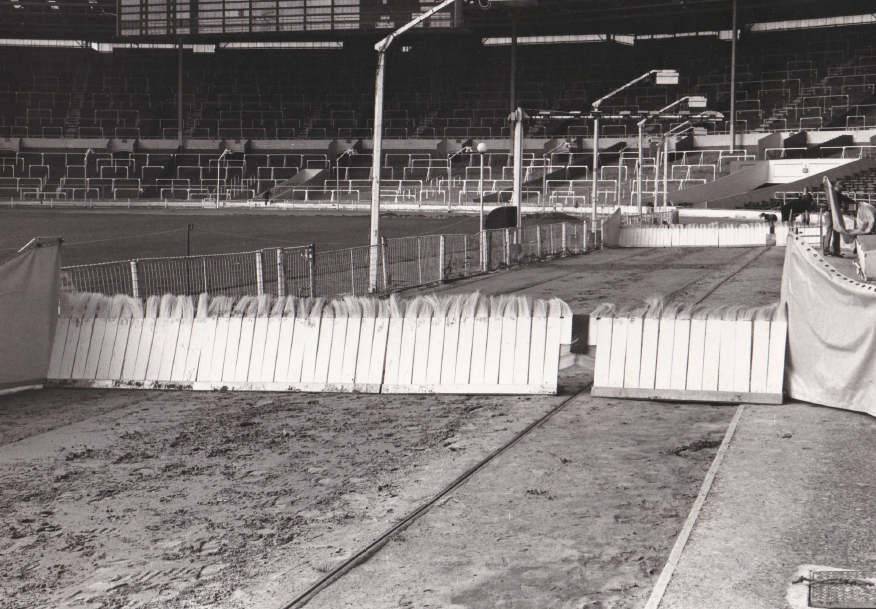
Greyhound racing hurdles, Wembley Stadium c.1960

== History ==
=== Origins ===
After the 1924-25 British Empire Exhibition Wembley Stadium was in liquidation before eventually being purchased by Arthur Elvin. For the stadium to survive into the future it required much needed revenue and it was greyhound racing that provided it. Elvin and greyhound racing are credited with saving the stadium from closure and demolition.

=== Opening ===
The first meeting was held on 10 December 1927 when 70,000 people witnessed the first ever winner called Spin claim the Empire Stakes over 525 yards. The Director of Racing and Racing Manager was Captain Arthur Brice, he was well known as the judge for the Waterloo Cup.

=== Pre war history ===
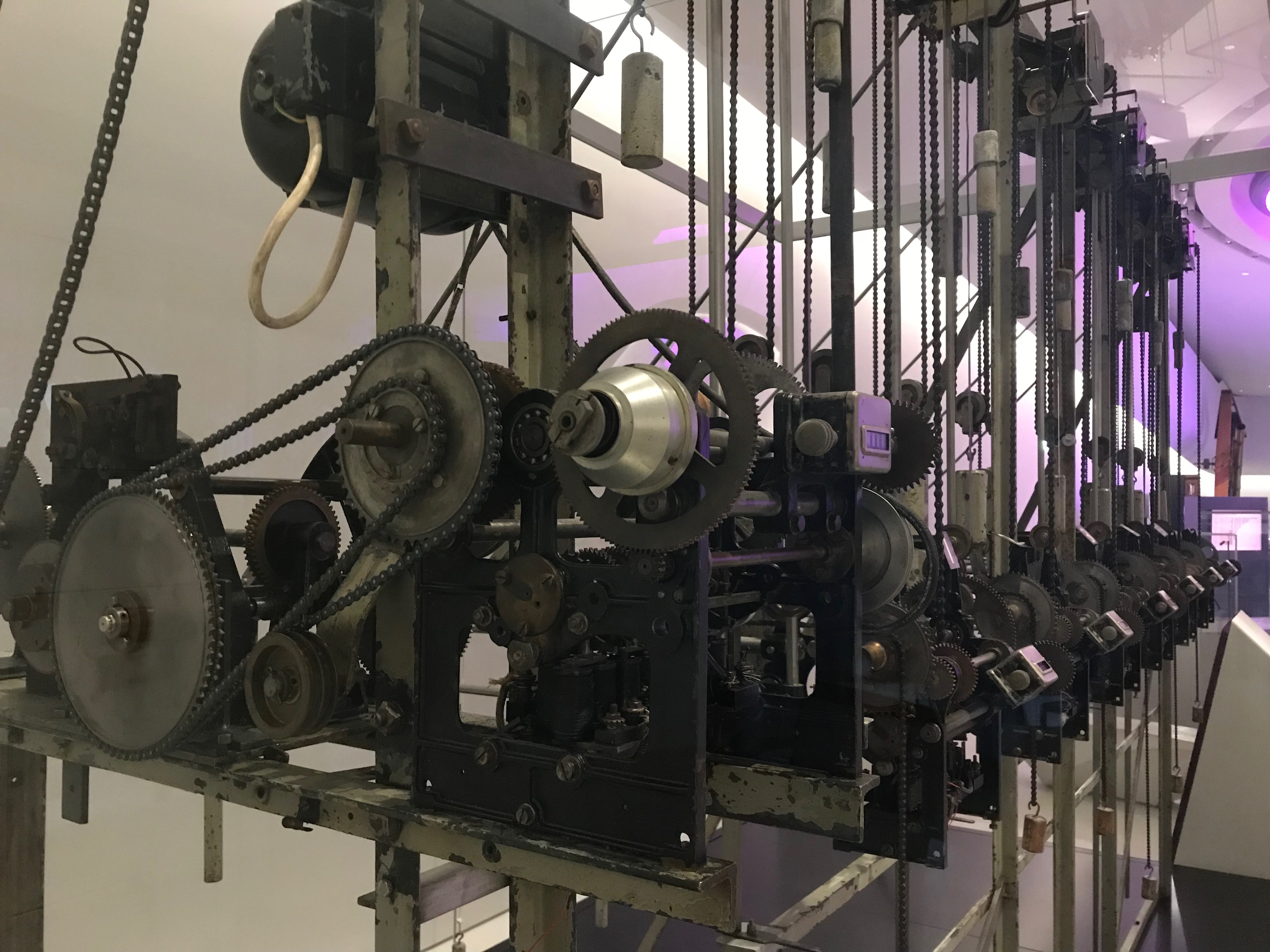
The tote machine from Wembley, now housed in the Science Museum

In 1928 the stadium introduced a major competition called the St Leger which became one of the most prominent classic races in the greyhound racing calendar ranking only lower than the English Greyhound Derby. The first ever running in 1928 was won by a local hound by the name of Burletta trained by Alf Mulliner. Over the following decades Wembley would become unrivalled in terms of major competition success and at times become almost dominant. Despite the success it was never seen as the spiritual home of greyhound racing because the White City Stadium which hosted the Derby took this honour and even after the closure of White City it was Walthamstow Stadium that took over the mantle.

Wembley attracted all of the sports greatest greyhounds and introduced further events called the Coronation Stakes in 1928 for bitches only, the Trafalgar Cup which started in 1929 and was as significant an event for puppies as was the Puppy Derby at the time, the Wembley Gold Cup in 1929, the Wembley Spring Cup in 1930 and the Wembley Summer Cup in 1937.

Mick the Miller won the 1930 Wembley Spring Stakes defeating a greyhound called Swashbuckler by a short head, Swashbuckler had won by 20 lengths in a race on the opening night and held five track records over all distances between 1928 and 1929. Mick the Miller successfully defended his title in 1931 culminating in a track record performance in the final and then claimed the St Leger later in the year.

Another star called Future Cutlet arrived on the track in 1931; he had come over from Ireland after being purchased for £600 by W.A. Evershed to race at Wembley Stadium; the Probert trained brindle dog became the first Derby winner for Wembley.

Arthur 'Doc' Callanan joined the training ranks in 1931 which included Alf Mulliner, Thomas Cudmore, Bob Burls, Sidney Probert and Jim Syder Sr. The track characteristics were described as a fast galloping track 463 yards in circumference with long straights and easy turns, it was also noted that the track was well kept and well turfed but the course was too rigorous for the smaller type of dog and an 'Inside MacWhirter Trackless' hare system was used. The greyhounds were kept on site in the grounds of the stadium with facilities found on the left hand side of the famous Twin Towers, they included six sets of kennels housing 300 greyhounds in total with incorporated kitchens, each had its own paddock area and they were situated next door to the racing and administration offices. In addition there were isolation kennels for sick greyhounds, a large training gallop a large paddock by the racing kennels, and a veterinary surgery. The racing kennels were only on race nights.

Two significant training appointments were made starting with Harry 'Jack' Harvey in 1936 and Leslie Reynolds three years later in 1939. The pair embarked on a series of competition wins that was the most successful in the industry for three decades.

=== 1946-1950 ===
In 1946 Bah's Choice an English bred greyhound trained by Bob Burls clocked 29.04 sec to set a new 525 yards world and track record. Under the leadership of Arthur Elvin the greyhound racing made very large profits in 1947 of £610,000 of which £343,000 was taken by the government in tax. The totalisator turnover was a £10,905,145 the equivalent of a staggering £411 million as of 2015.

=== 1950s ===
In 1952 the track underwent changes, the circumference was shortened to 435 metres and the Inside MacWhirter Trackless hare system was replaced by an Outside McKee Scott. Three of the most well-known owners the all ran their greyhounds at Wembley; the trio of George Flintham, Noel Purvis and Norman Dupont purchased and owned many of the sports leading greyhounds. In 1953 30,000 people watched the final of the St Leger with Magourna Reject and the race was screened on television. John Jolliffe had taken over as Racing Manager in the late 1940s and he recruited Jack Tetlow as his deputy.

During 1958 Pigalle Wonder recorded 28.78 sec at Wembley, a best time that stood for almost 20 years until the distance was changed to metres. Jim Syder Jr retired and Leslie Reynolds died with the latter leaving a legacy and record of training five Derby winners. Their replacements were Jack Kinsley and Jimmy Rimmer.

=== 1960s ===
In 1966 the government extended on course betting tax to all greyhound tracks. In the same year during the 1966 World Cup greyhound racing history was made when Wembley refused to cancel the greyhound meeting scheduled resulting in the Uruguay versus France fixture moving to be played at White City. In 1968 Jolliffe retired after a 37-year career, also retiring was the well respected trainer Ronnie Melville replaced by the Tom Johnston Jr.

=== 1970s ===
The Wembley kennels were demolished in 1973 which forced some of the trainers to relocate. Jack Harvey, Bob Burls and Jack Kinsley all chose early retirement. Using a contract trainer system replacements included John Coleman from Romford Stadium and Wally Ginzel. Jack Tetlow also retired ending a 43-year association with the stadium to be replaced by a new Racing Manager called Ron Fraser.

Westpark Mustard trained by Tom Johnston Jr. embarked on a record run in 1974 and after sixteen successive wins she would race and win four times at Wembley to break Mick the Miller's existing record. In 1978 Peter Shotton took the role of head of racing at Wembley followed by his assistant Jim Cremin who would later become editor of the Racing Post

=== 1980s ===
An event called 'The Blue Riband' was introduced in 1981 which replaced the long running Spring Cup which had been one of the first major competitions in the greyhound racing calendar. The stadium hosted the only ever meeting between Ballyregan Bob and Scurlogue Champ in 1985, the invitation race saw Ballyregan Bob equal the Westpark Mustard's record but sadly Scurlogue Champ failed to finish after pulling up lame. A future BBC Television trophy winner Glenowen Queen finished second but 11¾ lengths adrift.

The Greyhound Racing Association GRA was taken over by Wembley plc in 1987 in a £68.5 million merger, meaning that the Wembley greyhound operation now came entirely under the GRA banner. John Rowley was the Wembley Racing Manager assisted by Peter Miller with trainers attached to the track being Ted Dickson, Pam Heasman, Adam Jackson, Wally Ginzel, John Honeysett, Tom Johnston Jr. and Hazel Walden.

=== 1990s ===
By 1992 GRA parent company Wembley plc announced losses of £8 million despite a £13 million profit in its UK operation. Later the Wembley plc American greyhound operation saw profits fall from £5.9 to £3.3 million and the British tracks made a £2.1 million profit but Wembley plc was servicing a sizeable debt.

=== Closure ===
In 1998 during a very difficult spell the news arrived that the greyhound racing would end as plans were revealed for the stadium rebuild. The sport that had been responsible for the survival of the stadium for decades had not been included in the new plans. The last race was held on Friday 18 December 1998.

== Competitions ==
=== Wembley Gold Cup ===
The Wembley Gold Cup was a competition held from 1929 over the stayers distance until the stadium closed.

Year	Winner	Trainer	Time	SP
1929	Chain Mail	Jack Kennedy Harringay)	41.52	3/1
1930	War Cloud		41.45	2/1
1931	Maiden's Boy	Samuel Young (Private)	41.42	8/11f
1932	Maiden's Boy	Samuel Young (Private)	41.46	7/2
1933	Jubilee Jim	Walter Green (West Ham)	41.15	1/3f
1934	Scallywag II	Claude Champion (Catford)	41.11	1/2f
1935	Mick The Moocher	Sidney Orton (Wimbledon)	41.12	11/4
1936	Satans Baby	Les Parry (White City)	41.30	2/1f
1937	Grosvenor Edwin	Jim Syder Sr. (Wimbledon)	41.07	7/2
1938	Grosvenor Edwin	F Rolfe (Private)	40.96	1/2f
1939	Catherine of Waterhall	Bill Cowell (West Ham)	40.71	100/6
1940	Muskerry Cream	Paddy Fortune (Wimbledon)	39.90	8/11f
1941	Majestic Sandills	C Crowley (Catford)	40.71	2/1jf
1942	Patty Dear (dead-heat)	John Snowball (Clapton)	41.26	9/2
1942	Ashfield Star (dead-heat)	Gordon Beesley (Wembley)	41.26	8/1
1943	Maidens Champion	Paddy McEllistrim (Wimbledon)	40.44	11-10f
1944	Model Dasher	Tom Baldwin (Perry Barr)	39.93	4-5f
1945	Kampion Sailor	Sidney Orton (Wimbledon)	40.19	4-9f
1946	Lilacs Luck	R Jones (Doncaster)	40.06	4-6f
1947	Mad Midnight	Jack Toseland (Perry Barr)	40.03	1-4f
1948	Northam Star	Leslie Reynolds (Wembley)	40.65	5-4f
1949	Rising Tide II	Sidney Probert (Wembley)	40.60	6-1
1950	Captain The Killer	Norman Merchant (Private)	40.40	7-4f
1951	Rapid Choice	Paddy McEvoy (Private)	40.62	7-4
1952	Pass On Express	Tom Lightfoot (White City)	40.56	1-5f
1953	Malanna Mace	Henry Parsons (Crayford)	41.09	9-2
1954	Mottram Hero	Leslie Reynolds (Wembley)	40.39	3-1
1955	Catchman	F Quill (Private)	41.04	2-1
1956	Title Role	Jack Harvey (Wembley)	40.62	7-2
1957	Shandon	Joe Booth (Private)	40.37	6-1
1958	Highwood Sovereign	Leslie Reynolds (Wembley)	40.26	4-9f
1959	Greenane Airlines	Jim Irving (Private)	39.97	5-1
1960	Coradun	W Holland (White City, Man)	40.55	4-1
1961	What Cheer	Leslie Reynolds (Wembley)	40.60	
1962	Watch Kern	Tony Dennis (Private)	40.10	
1963	Northern Dante	Paddy Keane (Private)	40.03	
1964	Lucky Hi There	Jimmy Jowett (Clapton)	39.28 TR	1-3f
1965	Carols Champion	Johnny Bullock {West Ham)	40.08	
1966	Miss Taft	Bob Burls (Wembley)	39.68	
1967	Cullen Era	Clare Orton (Wimbledon)	39.79	
1968	Forward King	Ted Brennan (Owlerton)	39.81	
1969	Special Cognac	David Pett (Private)	40.19	10-1
1970	Monalee Peter	Tom Johnston Jr. (Wembley)	39.92	10-1
1971	Pallas Melody	Phil Rees Sr. (Wimbledon)	39.58	
1972	Pepper Joe	Charlie Coyle (Private)	39.93	6-4
1973	Scintillas Champ		40.26	
1974	Streaky Sheila	Charlie Coyle (Private)	40.28	6-1
1975	Glin Bridge	George Curtis (Brighton)	40.09	
1976	Paradise Peg	Ted Griffin (Bletchley)	40.07	5-2
1977	Westpark Kale	Phil Rees Sr. (Wimbledon)	40.14	6-4f
1978	Meadlands	John Coleman (Wembley)	40.28	
1979	Roystons Supreme	Adam Jackson (Wembley)	40.37	
1980	Black Earl	Ray Iremonger (Slough)	39.97	
1981	Linkside Liquor	Gordon Bailey (Yarmouth)	43.53	
1982	Big Dom	Sam Salvin (Owlerton)	43.76	10-1
1983	Minnies Matador	Paddy Milligan (Private)	43.50	
1984	Blue Shirt	George Curtis (Brighton)	43.76	
1985	Scurlogue Champ	Ken Peckham (Ipswich)	43.43	
1986	Track Man	Adam Jackson (Wembley)	43.43	
1988	Cottage Sparrow		43.83	
1990	Clonbrin Basket	Graham Sharp (Walthamstow)	43.45	1-2f
1991	Summer Fisher	Terry Atkins (Wembley)	43.51	9-4
1992	One For Shamie	Hazel Dickson (Wembley)	43.48	9-2
1993	Trans Domino	Maldwyn Thomas (Reading)	42.79	1-10f
1994	Miles Dempsey	Ray Peacock (Catford)	43.94	5-1

1929-1974 (700y), 1975-1980 (655m), 1981-1998 (710m)

=== Wembley Summer Cup ===
The Wembley Summer Cup was a competition held from 1937 over the standard distance until 1980.

Year	Winner	Trainer	Time	SP
1937	Eves Welcome	E Harfield (Private)	30.34	100-7
1938	Ballyjoker	Sidney Orton (Wimbledon)	30.07	3-1
1940	Junior Classic	Joe Harmon (Wimbledon)	29.60	5-2
1941	Ballynennan Moon	Sidney Orton (Wimbledon)	29.73	5-1
1942	Ballynennan Moon	Sidney Orton (Wimbledon)	29.40	5-6f
1943	Tower Style	Sid Jennings (Wembley)	29.65	10-1
1944	Ballyhennessy Seal	Stan Martin (Wimbledon)	29.29	11-4
1945	Newtown Defender	Paddy Fortune (Wimbledon)	29.25	4-1
1946	Bahs Choice	Bob Burls (Wembley)	29.60	2-1
1947	Dante II	Bob Burls (Wembley)	29.96	1-4f
1949	Behattan Marquis	Bob Burls (Wembley)	29.57	7-2
1950	Paving Stone	Jimmy Jowett (Private)	29.41	11-10f
1951	Mad Miller	Leslie Reynolds (Wembley)	29.30	100-8
1952	Endless Gossip	Leslie Reynolds (Wembley)	29.22	11-10f
1953	Galtee Cleo	Jack Harvey (Wembley)	29.36	5-4f
1955	Gulf Of Honduras	Jack Harvey (Wembley)	29.36	2-1f
1956	Northern King	Jack Harvey (Wembley)	29.40	2-5f
1957	Scoutbush	Bob Burls (Wembley)	29.34	4-7f
1958	Beware Champ	George Waterman (Wimbledon)	29.08	7-1
1959	Society Wonder	Jim Syder Sr. (Wembley)	29.48	3-1
1960	Clonalvy Pride	Jack Harvey (Wembley)	29.51	4-5f
1961	Sherrys Pal	Jack Harvey (Wembley)	29.37	
1962	Any Harm	Ronnie Melville (Wembley)	29.34	
1963	Shady Mermaiden	Phil Rees Sr. (Clapton)	29.53	
1964	Die Cast	Jimmy Rimmer (Wembley)	29.09	5-4f
1965	Venture Again	Dave Geggus (Walthamstow)	29.51	
1966	Cons Duke	Lionel Maxen (Hackney)	29.28	
1967	Taper Speed	Les Crawley (Private)	29.61	
1968	Yellow Printer	John Bassett (Clapton)	29.20	
1969	Northern Glow	Vicky Holloway (Private)	29.02	2-1f
1970	Valiant Ray	Jimmy Rimmer (Wembley)	29.04	
1971	Cobbler	Dave Geggus (Walthamstow)	29.15	
1972	Westmead County	Natalie Savva (Private)	29.56	6-4
1973	Butchers Flash	Tom Johnston Jr. (Wembley)	29.39	5-2
1974	Mones Hero	John Coleman (Wembley)	29.50	10-1
1975	Tory Mor	Paddy Milligan (Private)	29.25	
1976	Doon Fantasy	Terry Dartnall (Reading)	29.56	7-4
1977	Huberts Consort	Tom Paddy Reilly (Walthamstow)	29.17	3-1
1978	Pat Seamur	Geoff De Mulder (Hall Green)	29.02	
1979	Desert Pilot	Geoff De Mulder (Hall Green)	29.33	
1980	Super Glow		29.54	

1937-1974 (500y), 1975-1980 (490m)

=== Breeders Forum Stakes ===
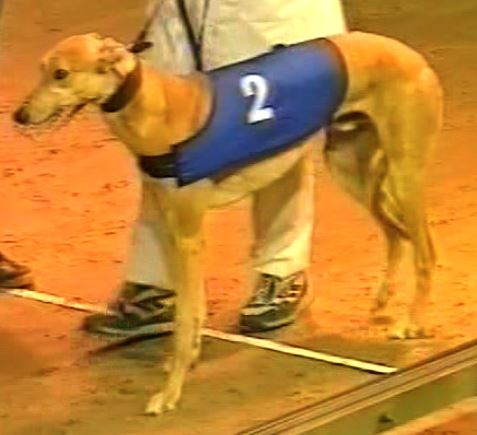
Sandwinder, Breeders Forum winner in 1987

The Breeders Forum Stakes was a competition held from 1972 over the standard distance.

Year	Winner	Trainer	Time	SP
1972	Decimal Queen	Mick Hawkins (Private)	29.45	
1973	Drynham Rocket	Natalie Savva (Private)	29.55	14-1
1974	Hollpark Rejon	Fred Lugg (Private)	29.63	11-4
1975	Daemonic Gambol	Paddy McEvoy (Wimbledon)	29.45	1-1f
1976	Dundrum	Sid Ryall (Wembley)	30.19	7-1
1977	Glenesk Comet	Randolph Singleton (White City)	29.34	5-4f
1978	Durfold Dandy	John Honeysett (Crayford)	29.42	7-1
1979	Close Encounter	Ted Dickson (Slough)	29.87	3-1
1980	Dodford Bill	Dave Drinkwater (Bletchley)	29.60	1-1f
1981	Duke of Hazard	John Coleman (Wembley)	29.16	4-6f
1982	Duke of Hazard	John Coleman (Wembley)	29.62	8-11f
1983	Glatton Grange	Kenny Linzell (Walthamstow)	29.25	10-11f
1984	Indian Trail	Smith (Monmore)	29.48	4-1
1985	Fearless Champ	Geoff De Mulder (Oxford)	29.15	4-6f
1986	Westmead Cannon	Mel Bass (Milton Keynes)	29.44	12-1
1987	Sandwinder	Vicky Holloway (Oxford)	29.20	5-1
1990	Burham Boy	D Walters (Canterbury)	29.79	5-2f
1991	Hare Flik	Peter Rich (Ramsgate)	29.33	10-1
1992	Westmead Spirit	Natalie Savva (Milton Keynes)	29.39	3-1

(490m)

=== Empire Stadium Stakes ===
The Empire Hurdles Stakes was a competition held from 1930 over hurdles.

Year	Winner	Trainer	Time	SP
1930	Smart Fashion	Paddy McEllistrim (Wimbledon)		
1931	Rule The Roost	Joe Harmon (White City)		
1932	Long Hop	Ian McCorkindale – Harringay		
1933	Scallywag II	Claude Champion (Catford)		
1934	The Longfellow II	Sidney Orton (Wimbledon)		
1935	Era Jem Mount			
1936	Red Car	Joe Harmon (Wimbledon)	31.09	7-4jf
1937	Border Mutton	Paddy McEllistrim (Wimbledon)	30.91	8-11f
1938	Lenins Ring	Joe Harmon (Wimbledon)	30.93	4-5f
1939	Printer	Paddy McEllistrim (Wimbledon)	30.23	5-4f
1940	Juvenile Classic	Joe Harmon (Wimbledon)	30.56	4-5f
1941	Tact	Paddy McEllistrim (Wimbledon)	30.49	9-4
1942	Still Moving	Paddy Fortune (Wimbledon)	30.56	11-8f
1943	Frating Dan	A F Dandridge (Catford)	30.17	2-1
1944	Derryboy Jubilee	Stan Biss (Catford)	30.25	6-4
1945	Nilo			
1947	Obstinate Invader	Jerry Hannafin (Wimbledon)	30.50	5-4f
1950	Shauns Bandit	Stanley Biss (Private)	30.65	100-8
1951	Devil O'Leer	W Taylor (White City)	30.15	11-10f
1964	Knowing Nowt	Gordon Hodson (White City)	41.86	7-1
1970	Petronius	Jack Harvey (Wembley)	41.56	
1972	Clinker Pat		41.61	
1973	Mad Cavalier		41.56	
1974	Secret Armour	Tom Paddy Reilly (Walthamstow)	30.49	
1975	Try It Blackie	Frank Melville Harringay)	30.22	
1976	Black Pengola	Phil Rees Sr. (Wimbledon)	31.05	4-5f
1977	Meanus Dandy	Joe Pickering (White City)	30.16	5-2
1978	Meanus Dandy	Joe Pickering (White City)	30.46	
1979	Bowery Music		30.67	
1980	Laurdella Wizard	Mrs Berry Bateman (Hackney)	30.49	9-2
1981	Westlands Steve	Gunner Smith (Brighton)	29.98	10-11f
1990	Gizmo Pasha	Linda Mullins (Romford)	30.83	11-8
1991	Ballinlough Hill	Arthur Hitch (Wimbledon)	30.09	12-1
1992	Regular Yank	Bernie Doyle (Oxford)	30.08	4-6f
1993	Heavenly Duke	Linda Mullins (Walthamstow)	30.14	4-1
1994	Lammermuir Lad	Bert Meadows (Oxford)	30.25	9-2
1995	In The Doghouse	Tom Foster (Wimbledon)	30.03	8-1
1996	Bodrun Sunshine	Linda Mullins (Walthamstow)	30.49	33-1
1997	Delightful Star	Russell Samson (Private)	30.02	10-1

1930-1973 (700y H), 1974 (525y H), 1975-1997 (490m H), 1952-1960 (not held)

== Track records ==
=== Pre-Metric ===
Distance	Greyhound	Time	Date	Notes/Ref
525y	Moselle	30.04	1 May 1928	
525y	Mick the Miller	30.04	23 March 1931	Spring Cup final
525y	Duffys Arrival	29.09	17 September 1945	National Record
525y	Bah's Choice	29.04	22 April 1946	World & National Record
525y	Pauls Fun	28.91	1956	
525y	Pigalle Wonder	28.78	26 May 1958	
700y	Model Dasher	39.73	9 September 1944	National Record
700y	Dante II	39.72	May 1947	St Leger semi-finals
700y	Dante II	39.70	1 June 1947	St Leger Final
700y	Clonalvy Pride	39.64	6 June 1961	
700y	Lucky Hi There	39.28	15 June 1964	Gold Cup Final
725y	Lucky Arrow II	41.19	30 August 1965	
880y	Avis	51.30	1962	TV Trophy final
880y	Chieftains Envoy	51.24	8 March 1965	
880y	Ballyhandy Cedar		21 March 1966	
880y	Miss Taft	50.78	17 July 1967	
900y	Hillstride	51.93	11 May 1964	
900y	Poor Mick	51.84	29 July 1968	
990y	Gananocque Ranger	58.32	29 May 1939	National Record
990y	Canada's Glory	58.20	18 September 1948	
990y	The Popular Streak	57.87	18 May 1959	
990y	Chantilly Lace	=57.87	16 May 1960	
525yH	Merry Matt		October 1929	
525yH	Dark General	30.09	20 May 1946	National Record
525yH	Ballinatona Special	30.10	4 September 1961	
525yH	Sherrys Prince	29.81	20 October 1969	
700yH	Saucy Lad	40.85	1 August 1960	

=== Post-Metric Track records ===
Distance	Greyhound	Time	Date	Notes/Ref
275m	Bray Vale	16.22	8 June 1979	
275m	Travara Rock	16.21	1981	
275m	Celtic Mythology	16.09	18 November 1983	
275m	Often Hungry	16.06	13 August 1986	
275m	Flashy Rocket	15.99	17 October 1988	
490m	Myroyal	29.01	3 September 1979	
490m	Decoy Ranger	28.99	1981	
490m	Glen Miner	28.98	5 February 1982	
490m	Fearless Champ	28.89	11 April 1986	
490m	Gino	28.82	22 April 1988	
490m	Yes Speedy	28.82	1989	
490m	Phantom Flash	28.79	1 October 1990	Produce heats
490m	Certain Way	28.76	14 February 1992	
655m	Tartan Khan	39.45	1 September 1975	St Leger Final
655m	Cullane Again	39.56	23 August 1982	
655m	Track Man	39.56	24 August 1984	
655m	Black Earl	39.73	19 May 1980	
655m	Ballyregan Bob	39.46	23 August 1985	St Leger Second Round
655m	Chicita Banana	39.51	5 May 1989	
655m	Spring Rose	39.29	5 October 1996	St Leger Final
710m	Roystons Supreme	43.40	3 September 1979	
710m	Try Travelscene	42.90	21 May 1982	
710m	Ballyregan Bob	42.63	11 December 1985	John Power Showdown
845m	Dunworkin	52.59	24 November 1975	
850m	Jolly United	53.13	1 January 1980	
850m	Croshea Echo	52.88	1981	
850m	Pineapple Choice	52.53	26 July 1982	
925m	My Tootsie	58.03	1987	
490mH	Westlands Steve	29.83	9 January 1981	
490mH	Castlelyons Cash	29.70	28 April 1986	6 flights
490mH	Gizmo Pasha	30.05	1989	
490mH	Ballinlough Hill	29.88	8 January 1992	5 flights
655mH	Trixies Snipe	41.60	2 September 1983	
655mH	Ellas Ivy	40.99	14 August 1987	

== Wembley Greyhound Derby winners ==
- 1933 Future Cutlet
- 1937 Wattle Bark
- 1948 Priceless Border
- 1949 Narrogar Ann
- 1951 Ballylanigan Tanist
- 1952 Endless Gossip
- 1954 Pauls Fun
- 1958 Pigalle Wonder
- 1959 Mile Bush Pride

== See also ==
Wembley Stadium (1923)
