= West Ham Stadium =

Defunct greyhound racing and speedway stadium in London

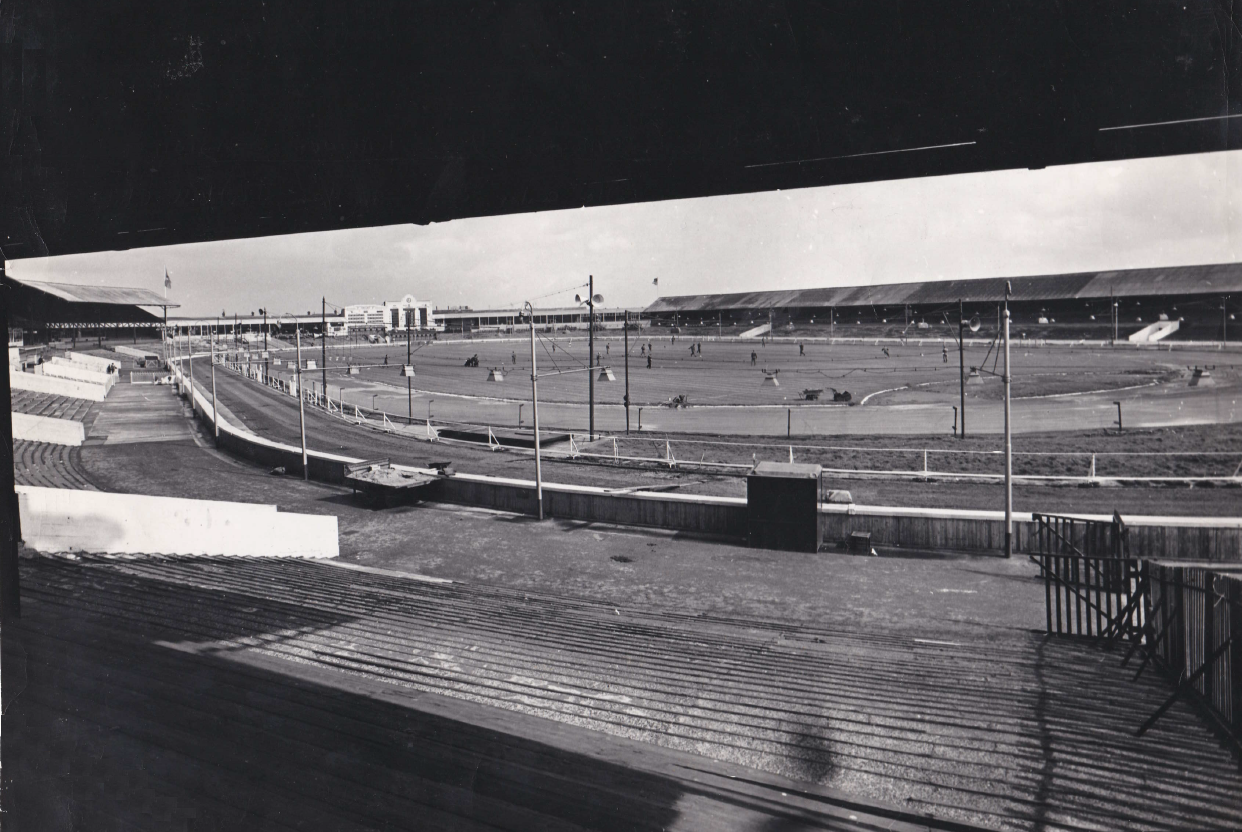
- Interactive map of West Ham Stadium
- Location: Prince Regent Lane, London, England
- Coordinates: 51°30′52″N 0°02′06″E

Construction
- Opened: 1928
- Closed: 1972

West Ham Stadium existed between 1928 and 1972 in Custom House, east London, England, on Prince Regent Lane, near the present-day Prince Regent DLR station.

The venue was used for greyhound racing and speedway on weekdays and had no connection with West Ham United football club, who played at the nearby Boleyn Ground, Upton Park from 1904 until 2016.

== Greyhound racing ==
=== Origins ===
Plans for a very large stadium in a rural area near Plaistow Marsh, east of Canning Town were unveiled in the late 1920s and work began on the structure where an old sports ground (built in 1855) was situated that had belonged to the workers of the custom house of Royal Victoria Dock.

The stadium was designed by Archibald Leitch, responsible for most of the major football stadia at the time including Goodison Park and Highbury. There was a large two tier stand accommodating 80,000 spectators with a smaller stand able to hold a further 20,000 bringing the capacity for the stadium up to 100,000. The track was the largest in Great Britain with a circumference of 562 yards and 123-yard straights. The standard trip of 550 yards did not even require a greyhound to complete a full lap. The track was lit by 70 x 750 watt lamps and used a special monorail train weighing 500lbs to carry the hare. There was also a very unusual design regarding the track surface which used turf laid on a wooden foundation which had been raised twelve inches above ground level which would consequently result in a very fast track. It was described as a well-sprung dance floor matted with a special fibrous substance.

The kennels consisted of six ranges totalling over 200 kennels within the two acres of the stadium grounds.

=== Pre war history ===
The first meeting took place on 4 August 1928. The stadium management brought in a race called the Cesarewitch, which gained classic status; the race started over the distance of 600 yards but become a competition for marathon greyhounds.

Early successful trainers were Ken Appleton and Stan Biss, both of whom had owned greyhounds on Wembley's opening night and subsequently taken out trainers' licences at Wimbledon Stadium before joining West Ham. Biss trained a famous bitch called Bradshaw Fold when she finished runner up to Mick the Miller in the 1930 English Greyhound Derby. Two weeks later Mick the Miller won the Cesarewitch winning by seven lengths in his heat and on the same day winning the first prize of £200 in the final.

West Ham won the Derby in 1931 with the Wally Green trained Seldom Led and one year later Future Cutlet recorded a second successive Cesarewitch victory setting a new world record of 33.78 sec in his semi-final. In 1936 the track introduced the Cambridgeshire which would stand as the tracks second major competition. One year later in 1937 the track opened a veterinary hospital on site. The Second World War forced the racing to be suspended on more than one occasion and the Canning Town area suffered terrible bombing damage due to the fact that the docks were seen as a primary target. The stadium was lucky to miss the destruction that many buildings suffered in the immediate area but there were continual closures until 1946. The West Ham operation was largely moved to Dagenham Greyhound Stadium from March 1944 until 1946.

=== Post war history ===
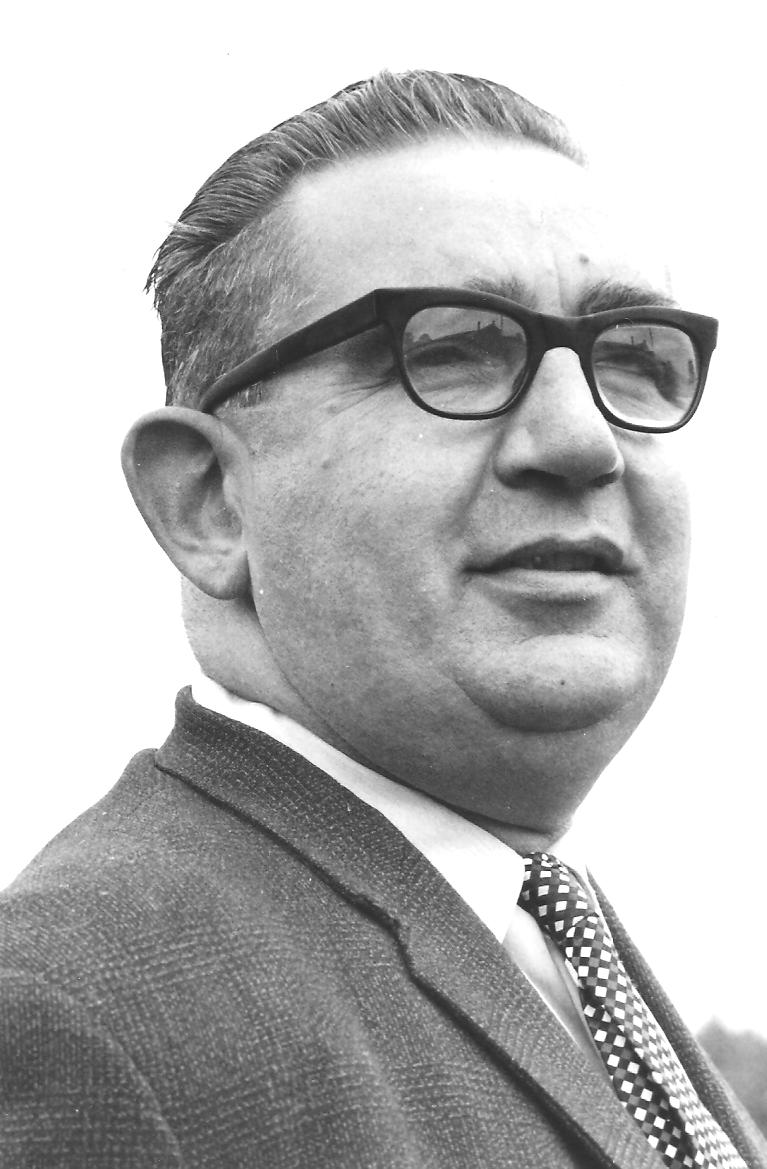
West Ham trainer Kenric Appleton

Due to war closures West Ham lost the services of Stanley Biss who did not return deciding to stay at Clapton Stadium. This left Ken Appleton, Johnny Bullock and Dal Hawkesley as the main trainers. Director of Racing was Captain W J Neilson and the Racing Manager was A W H Watson. Ken Appleton died in 1960 and his kennels were taken over by his son Kenric 'Ken' Appleton Jr. In addition Tom Johnston senior retired in 1962 and his son Tom Johnston Jr. took over his range at West Ham and achieved great success becoming Greyhound Trainer of the Year in 1963.

In 1966 the Greyhound Racing Association (GRA) bought an interest in the West Ham site and two years later Stamford Bridge trainer Sid Mann switched his runners to West Ham following the closure of the track. During the same year the GRA decided to move all of the greyhounds out of the Clapton and West Ham kennels and put them in their renowned training establishment at Hook Estate and Kennels in Northaw. The Northaw kennels would now house all trainers from Harringay Stadium, White City Stadium, Clapton and West Ham which brought the estate under considerable pressure. This sale of the West Ham and Clapton kennels brought unease with concerns over the stadia themselves.

Dal Hawkesley retired in 1966 replaced by his son Peter who was training in his own right at Romford who in turn moved to Harringay replaced by Wilf France. Hawkesleys head kennelhand Ted Parker and Colin West were also appointed by West Ham.

Sherrys Prince one of the great hurdlers was trained by West ham trainers during his first two Grand National wins in 1970 and 1971; they were John Shevlin and Colin West respectively.

== Speedway ==
Motorcycle speedway started in 1928 The following year West Ham Hammers were founder members of the 1929 Speedway Southern League.

Hammers were involved in the top flight leagues from 1929 to 1939; 1946 to 1955 and 1964 to 1971. They won the inaugural British League in 1965. Romford Bombers moved to the stadium in 1972, taking the name West Ham Bombers, but lasted for only part of the season before being evicted with the stadium due for demolition and its site to be used for re-development. The stadium and the surrounding land was sold for a total of £475,000. There are over 200 houses situated where the stadium stood.

West Ham Hammers riders included Australians Bluey Wilkinson, Jack Young and Aub Lawson, Swedish riders Björn Knutson, Christer Löfqvist and Olle Nygren, Scotland's Ken McKinlay, American Sprouts Elder, and English riders Tiger Stevenson, Malcolm Craven, Eric Chitty, Tommy Croombs, John Louis, Dave Jessup and Malcolm Simmons.

== Football ==
To fill the stadium on weekends a football team, Thames Association FC, was founded. After two years in the Southern Football League, Thames were elected to the Football League Third Division South in 1930, replacing Merthyr Town. The stadium could hold 120,000, but Thames shared a catchment area with Charlton Athletic, Clapton Orient, Millwall and West Ham United so it had difficulty attracting crowds and created the lowest recorded attendance in Football League history when just 469 people turned up to watch Thames take on Luton Town on 6 December 1930. Thames only stayed two seasons in the football league, coming 20th and 22nd out of 22 teams during their brief stay. They resigned from the Football League in May 1932 after finishing bottom and were dissolved soon afterwards. They were replaced by Aldershot in 1933.

In his 1975 book One Day I'll Lose My Trousers, Pete Murray, an English disc jockey, recalls times he watched Thames A.F.C with his uncle Bill Reece, who had a small bus company and was one of the directors of Thames. Murray states that he lived at the Nottingham Arms in Plaistow, close to the Custom House Stadium.

== Baseball ==
The stadium also hosted local baseball sides' home games in the 1930s and 1940s.

== Stock car racing ==
BriSCA Formula 1 Stock Cars racing was held in the stadium in the 1950s and 1960s. In 1961 the BriSCA Formula 1 Stock Cars World Championship was held at West Ham and won by Jock Lloyd, it was held again in 1965 and won by Ellis Ford. In those decades many enthusiasts and garage owners throughout the London area built and raced cars, by the mid 1960s BriSCA F1 stock cars had evolved from modified road cars into purpose-built single-seater "specials" of great power and stout construction.

== Closure ==
Towards the end of 1971 an announcement was made by Newham Council that West Ham would be sold for re-development. It survived until 26 May 1972 which still came as a shock because many had hoped for a reprieve. The speedway team had been evicted and the Cesarewitch was transferred to GRA sister track Belle Vue Stadium with the Cambridgeshire sent to White City. The stadium sold for a reputed £475,000 and was subsequently demolished with housing built on the cleared site, with some streets named after former speedway stars. These are Atkinson Road (Arthur Atkinson), Croombs Road (Tommy Croombs), Young Road (Jack Young), Wilkinson Road (Arthur 'Bluey' Wilkinson), Lawson Close (Aub Lawson) and Hoskins Close (Johnnie Hoskins).

== Track records ==
Yards	Greyhound	Time (Sec)	Date	Notes
400	Brilliant Bob	22.11	6 August 1934	
400	Cooks Sandhills	21.91	19 September 1942	
400	Wireless Time	21.91	27 December 1943	= track record
500	Come on Wonder	30.17	1970	
525	Brilliant Bob	29.61	20 October 1934	
525	Selsey Cutlet	29.26	1 April 1940	
525	Coolkill Chieftain	28.65	1956	
550	Maidens Boy	31.36	27 October 1930	
550	Cottage Luck	30.87	22 August 1942	
550	Drumgoon Boy	30.53	1949	
550	Hash Up	30.25	29 October 1965	
550	Come On Wonder	30.17	1972	
600	Mick the Miller	34.06	30 June 1930	National Record/Cesarewitch 1st Rd
600	Mick the Miller	34.01	9 July 1930	National Record / Cesarewitch semis
600	Future Cutlet	33.86	July 1931	Cesarewitch Heats
600	Future Cutlet	33.78	11 July 1932	World & National Record/ Cesarewitch semi-finals
600	Ataxy	33.50	16 October 1935	
600	Shove Halfpenny		November 1936	Cesarewitch semi-finals
600	Magourna Reject	33.24	16 October 1953	Cesarewitch Final
600	Gulf Of Darien	32.99	14 October 1955	Cesarewitch Final
600	Dromin Glory	32.97	5 October 1962	Cesarewitch
600	Failte Mal	32.96	23 September 1964	
600	Westmead Villa	32.96	3 October 1969	= track record
600	Cals Pick	32.72	1970	
700	Bradshaw Fold	40.04	31 March 1930	
700	Lilacs Luck	39.88	24 July 1946	
700	Don't Divulge	38.72	May 1959	
700	Park Nightingale	38.96	27 August 1965	Changed to outside hare
700	Westmead Villa	38.96	1972	= track record
880	Whipped Cream	51.79	31 August 1931	
880	Joystick	50.01	24 July 1964	
880	Spotted Nice	49.55	1970	
1000	Loughnagare	61.16	20 December 1930	
1112	Lucky Fire	64.85	1972	
550 H	Juvenile Classic	31.40	10 November 1938	
550 H	Captain Digger	31.21	20 August 1954	
550 H	Indoor Sport	31.26	4 October 1963	
550 H	No Chips	31.00	1970	
550 H	Sherrys Prince	30.89	1972	
600 H	Merry Matt	35.93	17 September 1930	
600 H	The Longfellow II	34.94	30 September 1933	
