= 1985 UK & Ireland Greyhound Racing Year =

The 1985 UK & Ireland Greyhound Racing Year was the 60th year of greyhound racing in the United Kingdom and the 59th year of greyhound racing in Ireland.

== Roll of honour ==
Major Winners
Award	Name of Winner
1985 English Greyhound Derby	Pagan Swallow
1985 Irish Greyhound Derby	Tubbercurry Lad
1985 Scottish Greyhound Derby	Smokey Pete
Greyhound Trainer of the Year	Kenny Linzell
Greyhound of the Year	Ballyregan Bob
Irish Greyhound of the Year	Ballintubber One
Trainers Championship	Kenny Linzell

== Summary ==
The closure of White City in 1984 had hit the industry hard but two greyhounds by the names of Ballyregan Bob and Scurlogue Champ began to popularize the sport once again. Ballyregan Bob won 21 consecutive races by the end of the year including the Olympic final, Test and Essex Vase final. Trainer George Curtis then chose wisely as to which events to go for in order to preserve the chance of breaking the world record which stood at 31. He was voted Greyhound of the Year.

Scurlogue Champ became a crowd favourite with his remarkable running style and became a household name when winning BBC Television Trophy on 22 May at Monmore and setting 13 new track records around the country.

The National Greyhound Racing Club (NGRC) released the annual returns, with totalisator turnover at £59,110,759 and attendances recorded at 3,786,216 from 4736 meetings. Track tote remained at 17.5% and government tote tax at 4%.

== Tracks ==
Southend closed after Boxing Day and Weymouth was redeveloped which ended the greyhound racing there. The Crayford & Bexleyheath Stadium raced until 18 May before the stadium was closed for major redevelopment by Ladbrokes. Work started on a new stadium on a different part of the site and would become known as Crayford Stadium.

Brough Park was sold again when former trainer Kevin Wilde headed a management team that leased the track. Kinsley was taken over by John Curran and Keith Morrell and Poole shut for four months during renovation.

Whitwood in Castleford raced for the first time under NGRC rules after switching from independent status.

== News ==
An Act of Parliament was passed in July allowing tracks to choose their own days of racing. NGRC secretary Fred Underhill had campaigned to change the laws governing race days and frequency of race days.

On 12 December Ballyregan Bob risked losing his winning run when taking part in the John Power Showdown at Wembley, a race that included Scurlogue Champ. The run at the time stood at 19 wins and he only needed one win to match the 1974 record set by Westpark Mustard. In an anticlimax Scurlogue Champ failed to finish after pulling up lame leaving Ballyregan Bob to equal the record and annihilate the field. A future BBC TV trophy winner Glenowen Queen trailed in 11¾ behind in second place.

== Competitions ==
Smokey Pete trained by Kenny Linzell won both the Scottish Greyhound Derby and Edinburgh Cup, during the latter he defeated kennelmate Ballintubber One by a short head. It is the third time the pair have finished 1–2 in a competition following the same in the Select Stakes and Circuit.

== Ireland ==
The Irish Greyhound Board produced figures showing increases in export sales including exporting to Spain. Tico, a black dog by The Stranger out of Derry Linda first ran at Clonmel on 8 July for his breeder Jimmy Morrissey of Carrick-on-Suir and won in impressive fashion by ten lengths, recording 29.86 seconds for the 525 yards course. A few weeks later he came into the charge of Slough trainer, Arthur Hitch. Tico cost his new owner, Alan Smee, £5,000 and had a few acclimatising runs at Wimbledon towards the end of the year.

== Principal UK races ==
Grand National, Hall Green (Mar 30, 474m h, £3,000)
Pos	Name of Greyhound	Trainer	SP	Time	Trap
1st	Seamans Star	Arthur Boyce	14-1	30.08	1
2nd	Knight of Raft	Norah McEllistrim	11-10f	30.12	5
3rd	Scottie Hero	Ted Dickson	5-2	30.18	4
4th	Nursery Pet	Tom Johnston Jr.	8-1	30.24	2
5th	Kilburn Jack	Ray Peacock	5-1	30.26	6
6th	Jon The Smuggler	Tom Foster	7-1	30.40	3

BBC TV Trophy, Monmore (May 22, 815m, £3,000)
Pos	Name of Greyhound	Trainer	SP	Time	Trap
1st	Scurlogue Champ	Ken Peckham	1-5f	51.64+	5
2nd	Saucy John	Terry Dartnall	6-1	52.42	2
3rd	Calmar		7-1	52.52	1
4th	Glenfort Sam		25-1	52.62	4
5th	Go Go Tiger		25-1	52.84	6
6th	Glins Lad		20-1	53.22	3

+Track Record

Scurry Gold Cup, Slough (Jul 13, 442m, £5,000)
Pos	Name of Greyhound	Trainer	SP	Time	Trap
1st	Daleys Gold	Jerry Fisher	4-5f	27.23	6
2nd	Glamour Hobo	Charlie Lister	6-1	27.31	5
3rd	Panama Jack	Ted Dickson	50-1	27.32	4
4th	Westmead Account	Terry Atkins	16-1	27.56	3
5th	Meadowbank Cue	Ted Dickson	10-1	28.46	1
6th	Rodeen Jet	Charlie Coyle	2-1	28.58	2

Scottish Greyhound Derby, Shawfield (Aug 10, 500m, £5,000)
Pos	Name of Greyhound	Trainer	SP	Time	Trap
1st	Smokey Pete	Kenny Linzell	7-2	30.29	4
2nd	Clod Hopper	Kenny Linzell	10-1	30.73	2
3rd	Fearless Champ	Geoff De Mulder	1-2f	30.83	3
4th	Honeygold Sand	Bryce Wilson	33-1	30.97	6
5th	Woodhill Smokey	Paddy Milligan	8-1	31.45	1
6th	Westmead Chase	Natalie Savva	7-1	00.00	5

St Leger, Wembley (Aug 30, 655m, £8,000)
Pos	Name of Greyhound	Trainer	SP	Time	Trap
1st	Jet Circle	Ted Dickson	11-4	40.14	4
2nd	Evening Light	Carol Aymes	12-1	40.20	1
3rd	Comment	D Shaw	4-1	40.30	6
4th	Special Bran	Paddy Hancox	10-11f	40.36	2
5th	Nursery Breeze	Gordon Hodson	33-1	40.80	3
N/R	Ballyregan Bob	George Curtis		Lame	5

Gold Collar, Catford (Sep 21, 555m, £5,000)
Pos	Name of Greyhound	Trainer	SP	Time	Trap
1st	Black Whirl	Tom Gates	5-1	34.99	5
2nd	Websters Flyer	C Smith	4-1	35.01	6
3rd	Gun Man	John Honeysett	10-11f	35.04	1
4th	Rathkenny Lassie	Miss M Coleman	6-1	35.16	4
5th	Nursery Breeze	Gordon Hodson	33-1	35.22	3
6th	Glens Opinion	John Honeysett	13-2	35.34	2

Cesarewitch, Belle Vue (Sep 28, 815m, £3,000)
Pos	Name of Greyhound	Trainer	SP	Time	Trap
1st	Scurlogue Champ	George Drake	1-3f	54.62	6
2nd	Saucy John	Terry Dartnall	20-1	55.10	1
3rd	Warflo	Kenny Linzell	10-1	55.16	4
4th	Moordyke Nicky	Geoff De Mulder	9-2	55.38	3
5th	Churchtown Pearl	Carol Evans	12-1	55.66	2
6th	Mobile Bank	Ernie Gaskin Sr.	16-1	56.10	5

The Grand Prix, Walthamstow (Oct 12, 640m, £5,000)
Pos	Name of Greyhound	Trainer	SP	Time	Trap
1st	Slaneyside Gold	John Sherry	5-1	40.00	5
2nd	Johns Dilemma	Graham Sharp	12-1	40.30	6
3rd	Track Man	Adam Jackson	7-4f	40.32	2
4th	Lata	Kenny Linzell	4-1	40.62	3
5th	Correct Number	Phil Rees Jr.	12-1	41.06	4
6th	Jet Circle	Ted Dickson	7-2	41.28	1

Oaks, Harringay (Oct 25, 475m, £7,000)
Pos	Name of Greyhound	Trainer	SP	Time	Trap
1st	Spiral Super	George Curtis	10-11f	28.57	6
2nd	Micks Susie	Mick Puzey	11-2	28.60	3
3rd	Ballyhaden Queen	Stan Gudgin	9-2	28.68	5
4th	Mrs Cherry	Derek Knight	11-2	28.76	1
5th	Sailing Maid	Paddy Coughlan	14-1	28.96	2
6th	Chocolate Satin	Adam Jackson	10-1	29.00	4

Laurels, Wimbledon (Dec 28, 460m, £5,000)
Pos	Name of Greyhound	Trainer	SP	Time	Trap
1st	Ballygroman Jim	Ernie Gaskin Sr.	7-4f	27.68	2
2nd	Keeper Tom	Gary Baggs	9-4	27.82	5
3rd	Lulus Hero	Gunner Smith	6-1	27.88	1
4th	Glamour Hobo	Charlie Lister	10-1	27.92	4
5th	Dusty Fag	Kenny Linzell	6-1	28.10	3
6th	Barbaran	Mary Harding	8-1	28.20	6

John Power Showdown, Wembley (Dec 12, 710m, £12,000)
Pos	Name of Greyhound	Trainer	SP	Time	Trap
1st	Ballyregan Bob	George Curtis	4-9f	42.63+	4
2nd	Glenowen Queen (dh)	Dick Hawkes	25-1	43.57	1
2nd	Track Man (dh)	Adam Jackson	12-1	43.57	3
4th	Scurlogue Champ	Ken Peckham	9-4	dnf	6

+Track Record dh = dead-heat

== Totalisator returns ==
Extended content

The totalisator returns declared to the National Greyhound Racing Club for the year 1985 are listed below.

Stadium	Turnover £
London (Walthamstow)	8,879,808
London (Wimbledon)	6,009,555
Romford	4,123,093
Brighton & Hove	3,836,130
London (Harringay)	3,369,474
London (Wembley)	3,213,646
London (Catford)	3,174,234
Slough	2,999,195
Manchester (Belle Vue)	2,251,949
Birmingham (Hall Green)	2,103,220
Edinburgh (Powderhall)	1,789,572
Sheffield (Owlerton)	1,313,964
Newcastle (Brough Park)	1,307,285

Stadium	Turnover £
Wolverhampton (Monmore)	1,181,028
Glasgow (Shawfield)	1,127,828
Ramsgate	981,338
Yarmouth	907,618
Portsmouth	897,416
Maidstone	785,448
London (Hackney)	709,702
Milton Keynes	615,645
Bristol	556,442
Oxford	496,808
Derby	487,403
Reading	471,947
Hull (Old Craven Park)	393,365

Stadium	Turnover £
Crayford & Bexleyheath	385,900
Rye House	384,760
Poole	380,668
Henlow (Bedfordshire)	373,900
Cradley Heath	338,210
Swindon	318,277
Nottingham	265,707
Peterborough	255,363
Norton Canes	246,346
Middlesbrough	235,697
Coventry	229,767
Ipswich	222,118
Castleford	23,223
