= Test (greyhound competition) =

The Test
- Location: Walthamstow Stadium
- Inaugurated: 1941
- Final run: 2008

Race information
- Distance: 640 metres
- Surface: Sand

The Test was a feature greyhound competition inaugurated at Walthamstow in 1941.

The race was originally raced over a stayers distance before increasing to a marathon distance.

It reverted to its original distance in 1979. The race came to an end following the closure of Walthamstow in 2008. Winners included the legendary Ballyregan Bob.

== Past winners ==
Year	Winner	Breeding	Trainer	Time	SP
1941	Brilliant Swallow	Brilliant Bob – New Beginner	Mrs B Lark (Walthamstow)	41.41	8-1
1942	Dew Sign		Mrs F Deathbridge (Walthamstow)	41.29	13-8jf
1943	Blackwater Cutlet	Woodrow – Editors Belle	Paddy Fortune (Wimbledon)	42.04	3-1
1944	Model Dasher	Model Whiskey – Dashing Comet	Tom Baldwin (Perry Barr)	40.96	1-8f
1941	Kampion Sailor	Lights O’London – Grosvenor Faith	Sidney Orton (Wimbledon)	41.45	3-1
1946	Mondays News	Orlucks Best – Monday Next	Fred Farey (Private)	42.27	3-1
1947	Aura Monarch	Mad Tanist – Fair Madge	Bob Burls (Wembley)	41.06	7-2
1948	Lovely Rio	Fish Hill – Rio Czarina	Stanley Biss (Clapton)	41.43	9-4f
1949	Quare Caltha		Frank Davis (Private)	41.76	11-10f
1950	Solidago	Gala Flash – Spring Flower	Bert Heyes (White City)	41.43	13-8
1951	Briefed		Bob Burls (Wembley)	40.91	7-1
1952	Malanna Mace		Henry Parsons (Crayford)	41.49	4-7f
1953	Glittering Too		Jimmy Jowett (Clapton)	41.54	100-30
1954	The Sherpa		Noreen Collin (Private)	41.00	7-1
1955	Snow Trails	The Grand Champion - Jazzello	Reg 'String' Marsh (Walthamstow)	40.88	8-13f
1956	Whats Yat	Magourna Reject - Coolflash	Leslie Reynolds (Wembley)	41.00	4-1
1961	The Fixer	Flash Jack – Dream of Pleasure	Dave Geggus (Walthamstow)	40.97	
1962	Westpark	Hi There – Faoide	Tom Paddy Reilly (Walthamstow)	40.30	
1963	Westpark Violet	The Glen Abbey – Westpark Goldilocks	Barney O'Connor (Walthamstow)	40.43	
1964	Hash	Dromin Flash – Cheeky Ciss	Noreen Collin (Private)	40.63	6-4f
1965	Blazing Rocket	Wild Rocket – Lady Philambus	Bill Kelly (Clapton)	40.24	
1966	Peculiar Way	Mad Era – Lottera Queen	George Curtis (Portsmouth)	41.64	
1967	Estelles Folly	Ashtown Tanist – Her Glory	Tom Paddy Reilly (Walthamstow)	41.54	
1968	Fully Booked	Booked Out – Parkhouse Sally	Eric Adkins (Private)	40.01	7-2
1969	Precious Dan	Prairie Flash – Precious Margo	Les Crawley (Private)	52.87	13-2
1970	Curraheen Lady	Beau Jolais II – Curraheen Bride	Peter Collett (Private)	52.25	8-15f
1971	Bill The Pig	Tontine – Flame Lady	Tom Reilly (Walthamstow)	52.60	5-1
1972	Westmead Lane	Clonalvy Pride – Cricket Dance	Natalie Savva (Private)	52.95	7-2
1974	Chain Gang	Monalee Champion - No Mabel	Frank Melville (Harringay)	52.63	3-1
1975	Silver Sceptre	Maryville Hi - Trojan Major	Reg Young (Bletchley)	52.09	8-1
1977	Blue Angel	Monalee Champion – Dolores Rocket	Paddy Coughlan (Crayford)	52.87	11-2
1979	Jingling Star	Glin Bridge - Some Laugh	Gunner Smith (Hove)	40.43	9-4f
1980	Mr Squeeze	Itsachampion – Over In Doon	Johnny Faint (Private)	40.20	9-2
1981	Valient May	Glen Rock – Valient Daisy	Gary Baggs (Walthamstow)	40.22	7-1
1982	Westmead Gem	Westmead County – Ka Boom	Natalie Savva (Milton Keynes)	40.33	12-1
1983	Go Winston	Let Him Go – Dark Bird	Ralph Smith (Perry Barr)	40.07	5-2
1984	Poor Ray	Knockrour Street – Currabell	Stan Kennett (Private)	40.12	11-2
1985	Ballyregan Bob	Ballyheigue Moon – Evening Daisy	George Curtis (Brighton)	39.59	1-4f
1986	Lone Wolf	Yankee Express – Breeze Valley	George Curtis (Brighton)	40.43	6-1
1987	Raywee Delight	Sand Black – Raywee Again	Don Thornton (Private)	39.82	11-2
1988	Fryers Well	Overdraught Pet – Mi Na Re	Bill Masters (Hove)	39.32	5-4f
1989	Sard	Manorville Sand – Knockroe Elm	John McGee Sr. (Canterbury)	39.34	9-4
1990	Sail On Valerie	Sail On II – Princeton Darkie	Ernie Gaskin Sr. (Private)	39.66	4-9f
1991	Rahan Arc	Whisper Wishes – Lemon Gem	Dick Hawkes (Walthamstow)	39.34	4-7f
1992	Rahan Arc	Whisper Wishes – Lemon Gem	Dick Hawkes (Walthamstow)	39.68	6-1
1993	Westmead Mount	Airmount Grand – Westmead Move	Nick Savva (Milton Keynes)		
1994	Redwood Girl	Ardfert Sean – Redwood Sue	Ernie Gaskin Sr. (Walthamstow)	39.66	5-2
1995	Call It Aday	Skelligs Tiger – Aisling Mint	Chris Duggan (Walthamstow)	39.68	6-1
1996	Castlerea Delia	Fionntra Highway – Another Banner	Ernie Gaskin Sr. (Walthamstow)	39.67	
1997	Roses Opinion	Leaders Best - Yagoodthing	Mick Puzey (Walthamstow)	39.68	2-7f
1998	El Franco	Magical Piper – Clear Issue	Linda Mullins (Walthamstow)	39.87	6-1
1999	Fernhill Flash	Alpine Minister – Rathneg Crystal	John Coleman (Walthamstow)	39.93	5-4f
2000	Fast and Easy	Slaneyside Hare - Anticipation	Lee Gifkins (Private)	39.59	2-5f
2001	No Can Waltz	Arrigle Buddy – Clonleigh Lass	Linda Jones (Walthamstow)	39.91	2-5f
2002	Rapid Best	Iceni Regent – Best of Noir	Linda Jones (Walthamstow)	39.97	4-11f
2003	Soviet Gypsy	Mountleader Peer- Soviet Atlantic	Ernie Gaskin Sr. (Walthamstow)	40.11	1-3f
2004	Dunmurry Bill	Split the Bill – Dunmurry Marion	Ken Thomson (Private)	40.79	7-2
2005	Paradiso	Carlton Bale – Armani Devil	Jim Reynolds (Romford)	40.23	12-1
2006	Lady Aishling	Top Honcho – Malta Magic	Kim Marlow (Romford)	39.39	8-1
2007	January Tiger	Droopys Vieri – January Vixen	Mark Wallis (Walthamstow)	39.66	5-4
2008	Aero Blackjack	Blackjack Tom – Great Madam	Mark Wallis (Walthamstow)	39.54	1-1f

== Venue and distances ==
- 1945–1968 (Walthamstow 700 yards)
- 1969–1974 (Walthamstow 880 yards)
- 1975–1977 (Walthamstow 820 metres)
- 1976 & 1978 (Not run)
- 1979–2008 (Walthamstow 640 metres)

Discontinued

== Sponsors ==
- 1984: E Coomes Bookmakers
- 1994–1995: Carling Black Label
- 2001–2005: Stuart Lambert Bookmakers
- 2006: William Hill Casino
- 2007–2008: The Duffy Group Ltd
