= Romford Puppy Cup =

British greyhound racing calendar

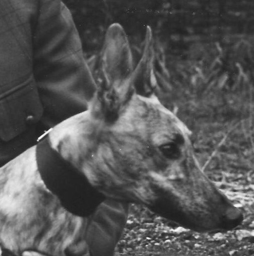
- The 1979 champion Sport Promoter
- Class: Category 1
- Location: Romford Stadium
- Inaugurated: 1975
- Sponsor: Corals

Race information
- Distance: 400 metres
- Surface: Sand
- Qualification: Puppies only (15-24 months old)
- Purse: £10,000 (winner)

The Romford Puppy Cup is a greyhound racing competition held annually at Romford Greyhound Stadium.

It was inaugurated in 1975. The competition is one of the leading races for greyhounds under the age of two and offers £10,000 to the winner which is the equal second highest prize money purse for puppies behind the Monmore Puppy Derby and equal with The Puppy Derby.

== Venues & distances ==
- 1975–present (Romford 400 metres)

== Sponsors ==
- 2006–2007 (Stadium Bookmakers)
- 2008–present (Corals)

== Past winners ==
Year	Winner	Breeding	Trainer	Time	SP	Notes/ref
1975	Xmas Holiday	Supreme Fun – Marys Snowball	Phil Rees Sr. (Wimbledon)	25.48	10/11f	
1976	Lyons Skipper	Burgess Heather – Skipping Chick	Clare Orton (Wimbledon)	26.54	5/2	
1977	Gan On Smokey	Laurdella Fun – Midi Robin	Randy Singleton (White City – London)	26.25	8/1	
1978	Schofield Fish	Minnesota Miller – Funny Fish	Jack Coker (Oxford)	24.69	5/1	
1979	Sport Promoter	Breakaway Town – Kensington Queen	Pat Mullins (Cambridge)	24.13	5/2	
1980	Coolmakee Hero	Peruvian Style – Nicoles Star	Tim Foster (Harringay)	24.45	7/4	
1981	Seaway Lady		Paddy Milligan (Private)	24.72	9/4f	
1982	Creamery Cross	Knockrour Slave – Creamery Alice	Allen Briggs (Private)	24.48	5/2jf	
1983	Blue Style		John Honeysett (Wembley)	24.02	3/1	Track record
1984	Hong Kong Mike	Knockrour Slave – Almathea	Ray Andrews (Belle Vue)	24.31	4/9f	
1985	Cannonroe	Glenroe Hiker – Westmead Rhythm	Nick Savva (Milton Keynes)	24.31	6/4f	
1986	Rhincrew Whisper	Whisper Wishes – Irenes Chick	Jim Wood (Private)	24.61	14/1	
1987	Curryhills Gara	Lindas Champion – Moygara Soda	Ernie Gaskin Sr. (Private)	24.23	4/11f	
1988	Brownies Outlook	Citizen Supreme – Hardi Hostess	Peter Payne (Romford)	24.44	10/11f	
1989	Kylehill Zig	Curryhills Fox – Kylehill Magic	Paddy Milligan (Catford)	24.79	5/2	
1990	Dempsey Duke	Shanagarry Duke – Willowbrook Peg	Terry Kibble (Bristol)	24.55	8/1	
1991	Taringa Bay	Kyle Jack – Nans Brute	Eric Jordan (Hove)	24.89	1/1f	
1992	Bonney Seven	Airmount Grand – Powerstown Pine	John Coleman (Walthamstow)	24.77	10/11f	
1993	Chakalak Zeus	Im Slippy – Mountleader Emer	Kenny Linzell (Romford)	24.47	7/1	
1994	Welfare Panther	Balalika – Sappys Susie	R Wheeler (Private)	24.17	7/2	
1995	Teds Move	Right Move – Rest On Daisy	Maldwyn Thomas (Reading)	24.84	16/1	
1996	Kalko	Perfect Whisper – Gold Doffer	Tony Dennis (Romford)	24.33	1/1f	
1997	Ballyard Recruit	Deenside Spark – Bower Sinead	Charlie Lister (Private)	24.19	7/2	
1998	Bunker Buster	Doyougetit – Magical Wit	Kenny Linzell (Romford)	24.43	11/8f	
1999	Droopys Rivero	Come On Ranger – Droopys Heather	Nikki Chambers (Nottingham)	24.61	6/1	
2000	Polar King	Trade Official – Kilree Pippin	Ernie Gaskin Sr. (Walthamstow)	24.42	15/8f	
2001	Droopys Survivor	Roanokee – Droopys Juliet	Paul Young (Romford)	24.73	50/1	
2002	Knockeevan Magic	Knockeevan Star – Knockeevan Lucy	Peter Rich (Romford)	24.70	5/4f	
2003	Living Jewel	Mancunian Star – Halfway Do Da	David Mullins (Romford)	24.55	14/1	
2004	Vamoose	Potto Knows – Human Nature II	David Mullins (Romford)	24.40	10/1	
2005	Fear Assassin	Borna Pilot – Borna Castle	Mark Wallis (Walthamstow)	24.74	9/2	
2006	Roswell Starship	Top Honcho – No Apologies	Mark Wallis (Walthamstow)	24.36	7/4	
2007	Westmead Keawn	Droopys Kewell – Mega Delight	Nick Savva (Henlow)	24.07	11/8f	
2008	Confident Kermit	Ballymac Maeve – Confident Aoife	John Mullins (Yarmouth)	24.21	5/4f	
2009	Lenson Bolt	Royal Impact – Catunda Paris	Tony Collett (Sittingbourne)	24.11	5/2	
2010	Rayvin Giovanni	Blackstone Gene – Droopys Sporty	Seamus Cahill (Hove)	24.08	4/5f	
2011	Eden Star	Top Savings – Aranock Val	Barrie Draper (Sheffield)	23.60	1/1f	
2012	Glanmire Lad	Ace Hi Rumble – Lead Boots	Mark Wallis (Yarmouth)	24.41	11/10f	
2013	Ballymac Marine	Ballymac Bull – Ballymac Sharon	Norah McEllistrim (Hove)	24.05	9/4f	
2014	Laughing Gravy	Head Bound – Rafas Wee Pet	David Pruhs (Peterborough)	23.83	6/4f	
2015	Droopys Brindle	Central City – Droopys Twirl	Paul Young (Romford)	24.42	7/2	
2016	Kooga Klammer	Roxholme Bully – Millbrook Gaga	David Pruhs (Peterborough)	23.75	2/1	
2017	Roxholme Nidge	Droopys Nidge – Silver Dollar	Hayley Keightley (Private)	23.70	2/5f	
2018	Grays Cup Winner	Tyrur Big Mike – Lizzylegit	Phil Simmonds (Romford)	24.08	2/1	
2019	Young Princess	Droopys Jet – Droopys Valerie	Paul Young (Romford)	24.09	12/1	
2020	Tenpin	Romeo Recruit – Droopys Sarafina	David Mullins (Romford)	23.71	9/4	
2021	Brookside Richie	Droopys Sydney – Droopys Greatest	David Mullins (Romford)	23.68	1/3f	
2022	Romeo Hotshot	Magic Sprite – Buckos Lass	David Mullins (Romford)	23.59	11/4cf	
2023	Romeo Crusade	Droopys Sydney – Fabulous Skylar	David Mullins (Romford)	23.94	20/1	
2024	Fire and Ice	Ballymac Cashout – Ballymac Cams	Matt Dartnall (Oxford)	23.84	1/1f	
2025	Scooby Diamond	Grangeview Ten – Scooby Duchess	Nathan Hunt (Romford)	24.20	14/1	
