= Silver Salver =

UK Greyhound racing competition

Kent Silver Salver
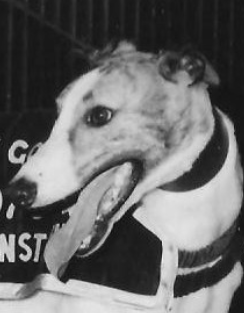
- Don't Gambol
- Class: Category 1
- Location: Central Park Stadium
- Inaugurated: 1933
- Sponsor: Arena Racing Company

Race information
- Distance: 277 metres
- Surface: Sand
- Purse: £12,500 (winner)

The Kent Silver Salver is a greyhound racing competition held annually at Central Park Stadium in Sittingbourne, Kent.

It was inaugurated as the Thames Silver Salver in 1933 at Southend Stadium but was discontinued following the closure of the stadium in 1985. However it was resurrected in 1988 by Canterbury. Once again the competition came to an end when Canterbury closed in 1999. In 2002 Sittingbourne brought back the competition in the new guise of the Kent Silver Salver.

After not being held from 2014-2016 the race returned in 2017 and one year later reverted to the format of a sprint competition. In 2024, the distance changed to 277 metres.

== Venues and distances ==
- 1933–1952 (Southend, 500y)
- 1953–1974 (Southend, 300y)
- 1975–1985 (Southend, 277m)
- 1988–1999 (Canterbury, 245m)
- 1993–1994, 2021 (not held)
- 2002–2013 (Central Park, 265m)
- 2017–2017 (Central Park, 450m)
- 2018–2023 (Central Park, 265m)
- 2024–2025 (Central Park, 277m)

== Sponsors ==
- 2010–2012 (Cab-It)
- 2013–2015 (Tiger Taxi's)
- 2020–2020 (Colossus Bets)
- 2022–present (Arena Racing Company)

== Past winners ==
Year	Winner	Breeding	Trainer	Time (sec)	SP	Ref/Notes
1933	Just Oblige		J. Oldfield (Reading)	28.93	5/1	
1934	Hymer Puritan			28.88	100/8	
1935	Border Mutton	Mutton Cutlet – Border Grand	Paddy McEllistrim (Wimbledon)	28.88		
1936	Border Mutton	Mutton Cutlet – Border Grand	Paddy McEllistrim (Wimbledon)	28.90	4/6f	
1937	Top 'O The Carlow Road	Town Rattler - Clarenbridge	Sidney Orton (Wimbledon)	28.92	6/4f	
1938	Quarter Day	Lawyers Fee- House Keeper	Joe Harmon (Wimbledon)	28.66	11/10f	
1939	Flying Jockey		Bill Cowell (Wembley)	29.26		
1940	Ruby Robert		Jerry Hannafin (Wimbledon)	29.06	2/1	
1946	Shannon Shore	Well Squared - Second Row	Leslie Reynolds (Wembley)	27.89	2/1	Track record
1947	Priceless Border	Clonahard Border - Priceless Sandills	Leslie Reynolds (Wembley)	28.04	2/7f	
1948	Good Worker	Tanimon - Dolly Meadway	Jack Daley (Ramsgate)	28.64	100/30	
1949	Red Wind	Dysertmore Prince - Light Biddy	Frank Davis (Private)	27.78	11-2	Track record
1950	Dicks Symphony	Dash Off Dick – Fine Wave	Reg Holland (Private)	28.41	7/2	
1951	Irish Hooligan	Mondays News – Idle Rambler	Jonathan Hopkins (Walthamstow)	28.52	7/1	
1952	Minorcas Hope	Mad Tanist – Dancing Minorca	Frank Conlon (Private)	28.21	4/5f	
1953	Uskane Lad		Miss Kathleen G Sanderson (Walthamstow)	17.15	7/4f	
1954	Morgans Hillside	Pro Tanist – Knockbrack Lass	Paddy Power (West Ham)	17.13	9/2	
1955	Big Buffer	Quiet Prince – Colleens Dash	Bill Matthews (Southend)	17.05	10/1	
1956	Majestic Matador	Shaggy Lad – Marchioness Judy	Jimmy Jowett (Clapton)	17.15	3/1	
1957	Howardstown Cu	Feabru Cu – Betting Tonic	Stan Martin (Wimbledon)	16.80	4/1	
1958	Tickled Pink	Glittering Look – Beyond Clogheen	Jimmy Jowett (Clapton)	16.70	4/6f	
1959	Red Kestrel	Dunmore King – Vera Cruz	George Miller (Clapton)	17.04	3/1	
1960	Chamois	Racing Man – Knockhill Lassie	Bill Riley (Romford)	17.01	4/1	
1961	Hi Tivoli	Hi There – Mulls Lil	Bill Kelly (Clapton)	16.45		Track record
1962	Knockalisheen Prince	Ollys Rambler – Miss Rancid	A.S.Roberts (Southend)	16.86		
1963	Mossdale Paddy	Duet Leader – Hillside Kate	Stan Martin (Wimbledon)	16.80		
1964	Sapphire Prince	Town Prince – Red Sapphire	Jimmy Fletcher (Private)	16.74	4/7f	
1965	Geddys Flash	Greenane Flash - Geddys Queenie	Jack Harvey (Wembley)	16.65		
1966	Near The Fire	The Grand Fire – Near Neighbour	Clare Orton (Wimbledon)	16.81		
1967	Rosslad King	Scraggy Lad – Mushera Princess	Clare Orton (Wimbledon)	16.71		
1968	Deise Leads	Knockrour Again – Ballyshoneen Star	Bill Kelly (Clapton)	16.88		
1969	Lovely Morning	Lovely Chieftain – Blacknose Trixie	Noreen Collin (Private)	16.80	10/11f	
1970	Don't Gambol	Prairie Flash-One For Minnie	Paddy McEvoy (Wimbledon)	16.56	8/13f	
1971	Fireside Reject	Yanka Boy – Fireside Duchess		16.76		
1972	An Toileanagh	Rusheen Gallant – Medium Wave	Terry O'Sullivan (Crayford)	16.61	8/1	
1973	Carrig Shane	Shanes Legacy - Carrigane Lassie	John Lancashire (Private)	16.49		
1974	Over Protected	Monalee Arkle - Spotlight Cindy	John Coleman (Wembley)	16.72		
1975	Chief Stuart	Ramdeen Stuart - Bottleneck	Tom Reilly (Walthamstow)	16.78		
1976	Mutts Silver	The Grand Silver - Simple Pride	Phil Rees Sr. (Wimbledon)	16.71	2/1	Track record
1977	El Patrone	Mels Pupil – El Raco	Ted Griffin (Bletchley)	16.79	10/3	
1978	Superior Champ	Knockhill Champion – Dusty Silver	Geoff De Mulder (Hall Green)	16.62		
1979	Kerry Smile	Free Speech – Kingdom Knock	Pat Mullins (Private)	16.62	11/2	
1980	Ballyderg Fox	Laurdella Fun – Flying Lady	Joe Booth	16.70		
1981	Woodland Chimes	Itasachampion – Flying Lady	John Gibbons (Crayford)	16.48	7/2	
1982	Sand Style	Sand Man – Ivy Style	Mrs Lilian Ockendon (Ipswich)	16.60	3/1	
1983	Daily Message	Peruvian Style – Miss Perfection		16.79		
1984	Music Neighbour	Lindas Champion – Coore Beauty		16.44		
1985	Noble Spirit	Luminous Lad – Peters Pride		16.58		
1986	Mals Pal	Dads Bank – Hot Message	Dinky Luckhurst (Crayford)	15.09	3/1	
1990	Jolly Castle	Cathys Fugitive – Hollyhill Fairy	John Copplestone (Portsmouth)	15.09	7/4f	
1991	Wheres The Limo	Glen Park Dancer – Kingswell Joy	Linda Mullins (Walthamstow)	14.87	7/4f	
2002	Oklahoma Gold	Roanokee – Lisnak Slippy	Kevin Connor (Catford)	16.80	2/1f	
2003	Dinny Joe	Staplers Jo – Collbawn	James Brennan (Private)	16.75	9/4jf	
2004	Thank You Madam	Roanokee – Churchtown Spice	Graham Brabon (Sittingbourne)	16.67	11/4	
2005	Borna Miller	Borna Miller – Borna Survivor	Alan Stevens (Oxford)	16.38	3/1	
2006	Blonde Alonso	Blackjack Tom – Rough Venture	Tony Dean (Private)	16.42	3/1	
2007	Greenacre Josh	Hondo Black – Greenacre Lin	Brian Clemenson (Hove)	27.74	5/2	
2008	Lenson Teddy	Go Wild Teddy – Three Star Gem	Tony Collett (Sittingbourne)	27.51	5/1	
2009	PamsTomjo	Droopys Maldini – Dees Dream	Wayne Wrighting (Hove)	27.28	7/4f	
2010	Greenacre Josh	Hondo Black – Greenacre Lin	Norah McEllistrim (Hove)	27.74	5/2	
2011	Lenson Teddy	Go Wild Teddy – Three Star Gem	Tony Collett (Sittingbourne)	27.51	5/1	
2012	Pams Tomjo	Droopys Maldini – Dees Dream	Wayne Wrighting (Hove)	27.28	7/4f	
2013	Kizi	Big Daddy Cool – Airport Boss	Norah McEllistrim (Hove)	16.24	2/1	
2017	Clondoty Alex	Razldazl Jayfkay – Castlehill Alex	Mark Wallis (Towcester)	27.72	3/1	
2018	Roxholme Hat	Ballymac Vic – Emma Honey	Hayley Keightley (Doncaster)	16.36	1/2f	
2019	Magical Houdini	Tyrur Big Mike – Impact Mixture	Patrick Janssens (Central Park)	16.18	13/8	
2020	Shrewd Call	Ballymac Vic – Shrewd Clover	David Mullins (Romford)	16.12	7/4f	
2022	Tintreach Jet	Droopys Jet – Ballyrobin Venus	Paul Donovan (Central Park)	16.09	11/4	
2023	Flashing Willow	Laughil Blake – Cabbage	Pat Buckley (Ireland)	16.00	11/8jf	
2024	Magical Bluebear	Good News – Magical Gem	William Russell (Perry Barr)	16.24	2/1	
2025	Rioja Oisin	Droopys Sydney – Oisins Choice	Kevin Hutton (Oxford)	16.01	7/4f	Track record
