= Essex Vase =

Greyhound racing competition

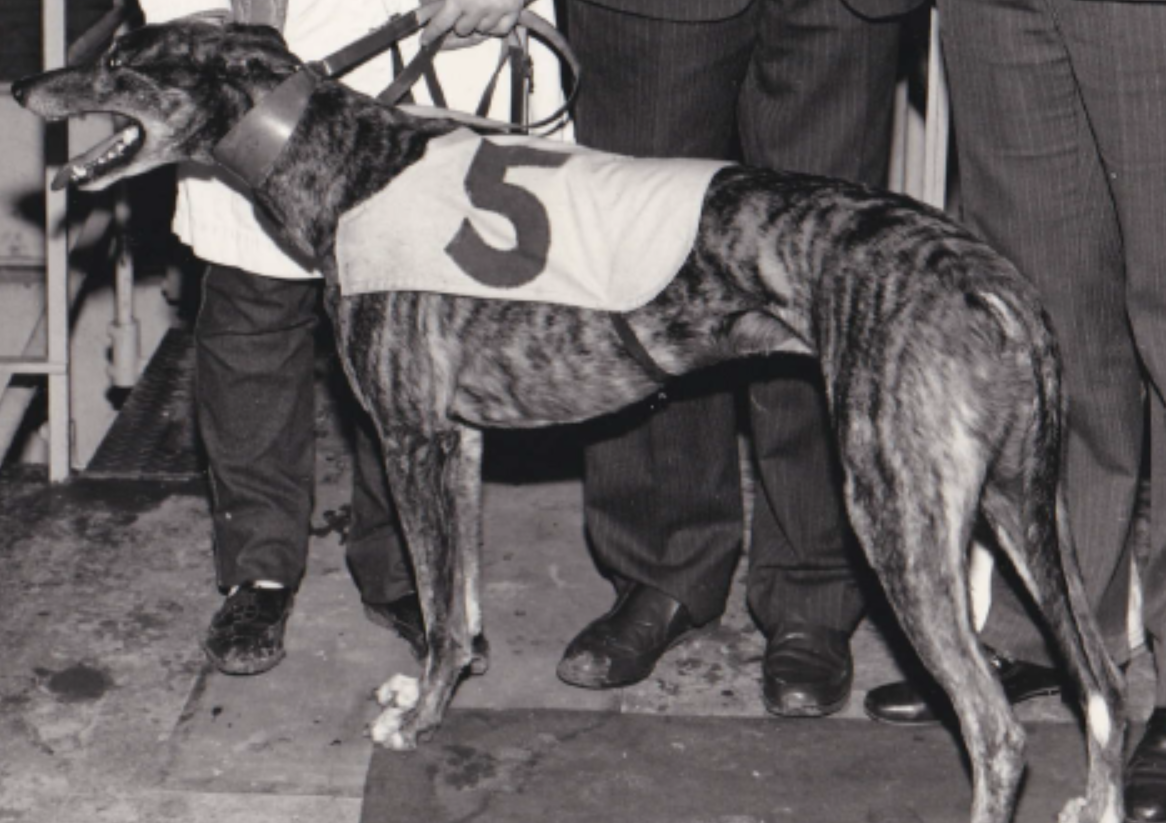
- The legendary Ballyregan Bob won the event in 1985 and broke the track record.
- Class: Category 1
- Location: Romford Stadium
- Inaugurated: 1939
- Sponsor: Coral

Race information
- Distance: 575 metres
- Surface: Sand
- Purse: £10,000 (winner)

The Essex Vase is a greyhound racing competition held annually at Romford Greyhound Stadium. It was inaugurated in 1939 and ran until 1949. It was decided to bring the race back in 1959.

The 2017 version of the event was delayed and held in March 2018, the winner Murrys Act is officially listed as the 2017 winner. Mark Wallis has won the competition a record six times.

== Venues and distances ==
- 1940–1940 (Romford 550y)
- 1946–1949 (Romford 460y)
- 1966–present (Romford 650y / 575m)

== Sponsors ==
- 1979–1980 (Coral)
- 1981–1981 (Bass Brewery)
- 1983–1989 (Charrington Brewery)
- 1993–1993 (Stadium Bookmakers)
- 2002–2026 (Coral)

== Winners ==
Year	Winner	Breeding	Trainer	Time (sec)	SP	Notes/ref
1939	Happy Squire	Happy Favourite - Happy Jest	Stan Gray (Southend)	27.75	4/1	
1940	Shamrock Peggy	Suil King - Musical Bride	Cornelius Crowley (Park Royal)	32.75	7/2	
1946	Humming Bee	April Burglar - Maesydd Maywest	Stanley Biss (Clapton)	26.12	7/2	
1947	Humming Bee	April Burglar - Maesydd Maywest	Stanley Biss (Clapton)	26.27	4/6f	
1948	Trev's Idol	Trev's Despatch - G R Bexhill	Fred Trevillion (Private)	26.26	9/1	
1949	Reynold's Maiden	Lone Seal - Odell's Light	Jack Pinborough (Private)	27.19	1/1f	
1966	Mel's Talent	Buffalo Bill - Nice Talent	Paddy Keane (Clapton)	36.74	11/10f	
1967	Shamrock Clipper	Jerrys Clipper - Shangri	Phil Rees Sr. (Wimbledon)	36.76	4/5f	
1968	Dicks Dilemma	Ashtown Tanist - Shanlyre	Gordon Hodson (White City - London)	36.49	3/1	
1969	Tarry's Gay Lady	Low Pressure - Tarry No Gain	Phil Rees Sr. (Wimbledon)	36.54	3/1	
1970	Quail's Glory	Westpark Quail - Glory Flash	Ted Parker (West Ham)	36.38	8/1	
1971	Dolores Rocket	Newdown Heather - Come On Dolores	Herbert White (Private)	36.06	1/1f	Track record
1972	Fit Me In	Myross Again - No Mabel	Jim Singleton (Harringay)	36.59	8/1	
1973	Kenneally Moor	Moordyke Spot - Kenneally's Tune	Clare Orton (Wimbledon)	36.91	4/1	
1974	Cowpark Yank	Yanka Boy - Cowpark Late	Terry Duggan (Romford)	36.70	5/2	
1975	Handy High	Handy Valley - Black Highbird	Paddy Milligan (Private)	36.62	11/10f	
1976	Westmead Myra	Myrtown - Westmead Silver	Natalie Savva (Bletchley)	36.69	7/4f	
1977	Xmas Holiday	Supreme Fun - Marys Snowball	Phil Rees Sr. (Wimbledon)	37.40	6/1	
1978	Bermuda's Fun	Supreme Fun - Avondhu Lass	Ken Usher (Romford)	35.15	4/1	Track record
1979	Black Haven	Blackwater Champ - Ahaveen Hunter	Peter Payne (Romford)	35.55	6/1	
1980	Taranaki	Sole Aim - Honeymoon Band	Peter Rich (Ramsgate)	35.82	20/1	
1981	Shandy Edie	Chain Gang - Out Of My Way	David Ingram-Seal (Private)	35.48	5/1	
1982	Glenmoy Raven	Black Legend - Glenmoy Lily	Arthur Hitch (Private)	36.03	12/1	
1983	Winning Line	Some Skinomage - Small Bend	Bill Foley (Private)	35.36	2/1f	
1984	Wheelers Tory	Glen Rock - Sandhill Fawn	Paul Wheeler (Private)	35.45	4/1	
1985	Ballyregan Bob	Ballyheigue Moon - Evening Daisy	George Curtis (Hove)	35.15	1/2f	Track record
1986	Rosehip Trish	Knockrour Slave - Rosehip Queen	Ernie Wiley (Hackney)	35.49	11/10f	
1987	Silver Walk	Noble Brigg - Annaghmore Slave	Ernie Gaskin Sr. (Private)	35.56	5/1	
1988	Double Bid	Skelligs Tiger - Tipsy Hostess	Philip Rees Jr. (Wimbledon)	35.27	10/11f	
1989	Poker Prince	Whisper Wishes - Proud Chill	Philip Rees Jr. (Wimbledon)	35.44	8/1	
1990	No Doubt	Oran Jack - Sipreme Cut	Peter Payne (Romford)	24.02	8/1	
1991	Vics Snowdrop	Daleys Gold - White Ranger	Philip Rees Jr. (Wimbledon)	24.34	5/1	
1992	Frost Hill	Glencorbry Celt - Ballycrine Spots	Linda Mullins (Walthamstow)	24.05	5/1	
1993	Up And Off	I'm Slippy - Cheerful Beauty	Ernie Gaskin Sr. (Walthamstow)	24.70	2/1f	
1994	Lisa My Girl	Murlens Slippy - Long Valley Lady	John Coleman (Walthamstow)	35.69	1/1f	
1996	El Tenor	Ratify - Ballygar Rose	Linda Mullins (Walthamstow)	35.96	4/1	
1997	Lenson Billy	Slaneyside Hare - Ballydaly Flyer	Norah McEllistrim (Wimbledon)	35.50	4/9f	
1998	El Loco	Slaneyside Hare - Moral Park	Linda Mullins (Walthamstow)	35.77	9/2	
1999	Honky Tonk Gal	Itsallovernow - Camagh Whistler	Linda Jones (Romford)	36.44	8/1	
2000	Ardera Laura	Right Wish - Clocks Perry	Kay Wyatt (Sittingbourne)	35.98	11/2	
2001	Willowgrove Pal	Top Honcho - False Creek	Patsy Byrne (Wimbledon)	36.05	2/1f	
2002	Top Power	Top Honcho - Able Ivy	Linda Jones (Walthamstow)	35.60	4/1	
2003	Orient Ron	Judicial Pride - Oriel Girl	Brian Clemenson (Hove)	36.61	5/4f	
2004	Loughteen Flyer	Larkhill Jo - Loughteen Velvet	Johnny Faint (Rye House)	35.76	8/1	
2006	Eye Onthe Veto	Kiowa Sweet Trey - Pennys Cloud	Mark Wallis (Walthamstow)	35.99	4/5f	
2007	Eye Onthe Veto	Kiowa Sweet Trey - Pennys Cloud	Mark Wallis (Walthamstow)	35.30	4/9f	
2008	Brickfield Dream	Boherduff Lite - Kehers Friend	Ernest Gaskin Jr. (Private)	35.67	8/1	
2009	Boolavogue	Razldazl Billy-Ahover Rachel	Chris Cronin (Private)	36.03	6/1	
2010	Judicial Pause	Brett Lee-Miss Freckles	John Gammon (Hove)	35.51	7/2	
2011	Westmead Maldini	Droopys Maldini – Mega Delight	Nick Savva (Private)	35.25	2/1f	
2012	Star Cash Simon	Kinloch Brae – Starcash Gracie	Kevin Boon (Yarmouth)	35.08	20/1	
2013	Reel Trickyone	Ninja Jamie – Lively Jubbley	Mark Wallis (Yarmouth)	34.84	11-/4jf	
2014	Adoremus	Kinloch Brae – Ballymac Misty	Maxine Locke (Romford)	35.37	7/1	
2015	Adageo Bob	Hondo Black – Blonde Pearl	Mark Wallis (Towcester)	35.05	2/1	
2016	Bubbly Torpedo	Razldazl George - Spioraid Cath	Paul Young (Romford)	35.24	3/1	
2017	Murrys Act	Tullymurry Act - Brave Meave	Kevin Boon (Yarmouth)	35.34	2/1	delayed, held in 2018
2018	Prime Time	Head Bound – Story Time	Phil Simmonds (Romford)	35.34	7/1	
2019	Droopys Aoife	Droopys Sydney – Droopys Hilda	Ernest Gaskin Jr. (Private)	35.08	9/2	
2020	Kilmessan Puma	Skywalker Puma – Talitas Girl	David Mullins (Romford)	35.47	16/1	
2021	Antigua Romeo	Romeo Recruit – Kilara Cher	Mark Wallis (Henlow)	34.66	8/1	
2022	Coolavanny Aunty	Droopys Sydney – Yahoo Katie	Angela Harrison (Newcastle)	35.25	10/11f	
2023	Aayamza Magic	Laughil Blake – Carefree Grace	Mark Wallis (Henlow)	35.32	10/3	
2024	Roxys Bullet	Eden The Kid – Roxys Lass	Paul Burr (Yarmouth)	35.28	12/1	
2025	Droopys Eunice	Dorotas Wildcat – Droopys Charm	Maxine Locke (Romford)	35.21	9/2	
2026	Tiffield Tarquin	Broadstrand Bono – Swift Acoustic	Roy Peckham (Yarmouth)	34.89	6/5f	
