= Coronation Cup (greyhounds) =

Greyhound racing competition at Romford

- Class: Category 1
- Location: Romford Greyhound Stadium
- Inaugurated: 1981
- Sponsor: Coral

Race information
- Distance: 575 metres
- Surface: Sand
- Purse: £10,000 (winner)

The Coronation Cup is a greyhound racing competition held annually at Romford Greyhound Stadium.

== Race history ==
It was inaugurated in 1981 at Southend Stadium. However, in 1985 Southend closed and the event switched to Romford. It is not to be confused with the Coronation Stakes that was held at Wembley.

== Venues and distances ==
- 1981–1985 (Southend, 647 metres)
- 1986–present (Romford, 575 metres)

== Sponsors ==
- 1994–2010 (Tony Williams)
- 2011–present (Coral)

== Past winners ==
Year	Winner	Breeding	Trainer	Time (Sec)	SP	Ref/notes
1981	Dark Omar	Mountleader Omar – Minnie O	Allen Briggs (Private)	40.78	4/6f	
1982	Sundridge Racing	Ivy Hall Solo – Rathduff Gazelle	Tony Dennis (Southend)	41.23	11/8f	
1983	Kylnoe Bob	Sandman – Virginia Chat	Bill Foley (Private)	40.61	6/4f	
1984	Shelton Song	Echo Spark – Candlemaid	George Curtis (Brighton)	40.58	11/4	
1985	Blue Shirt	Shady Monkey – Tour Tralee	George Curtis (Brighton)	41.02	11/8f	
1986	Hannas Champion	Lacca Champion – Raffles Bridge	Kenny Linzell (Walthamstow)	36.41	7/1	
1987	Copper King	I'm Slippy - Cleona	Ken Reynolds (Monmore)	35.50	4/5f	
1988	Ferrybank Lad	Debbycot Lad – Shes A Thief	Geoff Goodwin (Milton Keynes)	36.09	3/1	
1989	Terminator	Moral Support – Tiny Tolcas	Linda Mullins (Romford)	35.43	8/1	
1990	Stoney Stroney	Minestrone – One Sixty	Paddy Hancox (Hall Green)	36.07	8/1	
1991	Prince Charming	Mathews World – Jackswood Girl	Tony Tugwell (Reading)	36.04	4/1	
1992	Linakill Papa	Apapa Champion – Lisnakill Ruby	Linda Mullins (Walthamstow)	37.31	10/1	
1993	First Name Bart	Westmead Wish – Saga Miss	John Wileman (Nottingham)	36.46	3/1	
1994	Smile Rose	Kyle Jack – Feedwell Rose	John Coleman (Walthamstow)	36.26	8/1	
1995	Heres Seanie	Ardfert Sean – Mindys Miracle	Pat Ryan (Perry Barr)	13 Jan	2/1	
1996	Delta Duchess	Zanzibar – Bangor Style	Brian Clemenson (Hove)	36.24	4/5f	
1997	Clodeen Magic	Polnoon Chief – Lovely Lucinda	Brian Clemenson (Hove)	35.78	9/2	
1998	Killourney Ace	Lodge Prince – Killourney Amie	Brian Clemenson (Hove)	35.53	11/4f	
1999	El Loco	Slaneyside Hare – Moral Park	Linda Mullins (Walthamstow)	36.68	5/2	
2000	Nearly An Angel	Deenside Joker – Sallagh Sixty	Linda Jones (Walthamstow)	35.00	6/1	
2001	Seobie Girl	Deenside Spark – Hot Alert	Peter Payne (Romford)	35.70	6/1	
2002	Ballyhaden Lad	Some Picture - Ballyhaden Girl	John McGee Sr. (Private)	36.57	9/4	
2003	Gullivers Travels	Vintage Prince - Free Dreams	Linda Jones (Walthamstow)	35.89	25/1	
2004	Orient Ron	Judicial Pride - Oriel Girl	Brian Clemenson (Hove)	36.17	5/4f	
2005	Sportmans Prince	Vintage Prince - Killua Swallow	Tom Foster (Wimbledon)	35.73	4/1	
2006	Tinopener	Larkhill Jo - Sinners Envy	Patsy Cusack (Crayford)	35.36	3/1	
2007	In The Woods	Droopys Woods - No More Corner	Peter Payne (Romford)	36.80	10/1	
2008	Ronaldos Merit	Droopys Vieri - Lego Lady	Seamus Cahill (Wimbledon)	35.83	3/1	
2009	Droopys Carvalho	Droopys Maldini – Droopys Beauty	John Mullins (Yarmouth)	35.39	11/10f	
2010	Fatboyz Zorro	Yeah Man - Figlash	Derek Knight (Hove)	35.82	5/2f	
2011	Honey Trampas	Royal Impact – Honey Princess	Diane Henry (Private)	35.00	1/2f	
2012	Rathglass Hero	Brett Lee – Bluebell Fantasy	Norah McEllistrim (Wimbledon)	35.23	16/1	
2013	Rockview Sail	Hondo Black – Babyshan	Gerry Ballentine (Hall Green)	35.74	1/1f	
2014	Reel Trickyone	Ninja Jamie – Lively Jubbley	Mark Wallis (Yarmouth)	35.41	7/2	
2015	Soviet Kenny	Droopys Vieri – Invincible Diva	John Mullins (Yarmouth)	34.90	6/1	
2016	Millwards Master	Hondo Black Gene – Spioraid Cath	Paul Young (Romford)	34.81	10/1	
2017	Roswell Romanov	Quail Hollow – Kranky Leona	Mark Wallis (Towcester)	35.10	4/5f	
2018	Shotgun Bullet	Kinloch Brae – Winning Impact	Derek Knight (Hove)	35.25	10/11f	
2019	Desperado Dan	Iso Octane – Slaneyside Mandy	Patrick Janssens (Central Park)	35.27	2/1	
2020	Antigua Rum	Droopys Jet – Basket Of Trumps	Mark Wallis (Henlow)	35.06	8/1	
2021	No race due to (COVID-19 pandemic)					
2022	Baby Bullet	Jaytee Jet – Highview Picture	Jason Gornall (Henlow)	35.24	2/1f	
2023	Antigua Sugar	Ballymac Bolger – Dolce Vita	Mark Wallis (Suffolk Downs)	34.80	1/1f	
2024	New Destiny	Grangeview Ten – Coonough Dolly	Mark Wallis (Suffolk Downs)	34.53	5/6f	Track record
2025	Fabulous Sonique	Magical Bale – Fabulous Pearl	Mark Wallis (Private)	34.80	4/5f	
