= John Daley (cricketer) =

English cricketer and greyhound trainer

Jack Daley
- Born: John Valiant Daley; 1 February 1906; Beccles, Suffolk
- Died: 14 June 1986 (aged 80); Margate
- Spouse: Phyllis Leonora Kewley

John Valiant Daley (1 February 1906 – 14 June 1986), was an English first-class cricketer and a greyhound trainer.

== Personal life ==
Daley was born in Beccles; died in Margate.

== Cricket career ==
Daley played for Surrey County Cricket Club from 1936 until 1938.

== Greyhound racing ==
Daley trained a greyhound called Good Worker that won the 1948 Laurels, Silver Salver and Wimbledon Two-Year Old Produce Stakes. The following year the same greyhound won the Champion Stakes.

He was attached as a trainer to Ramsgate Stadium at the time but in 1949 he relinquished his licence to become a cricket coach.
