= 1982 English Greyhound Derby =

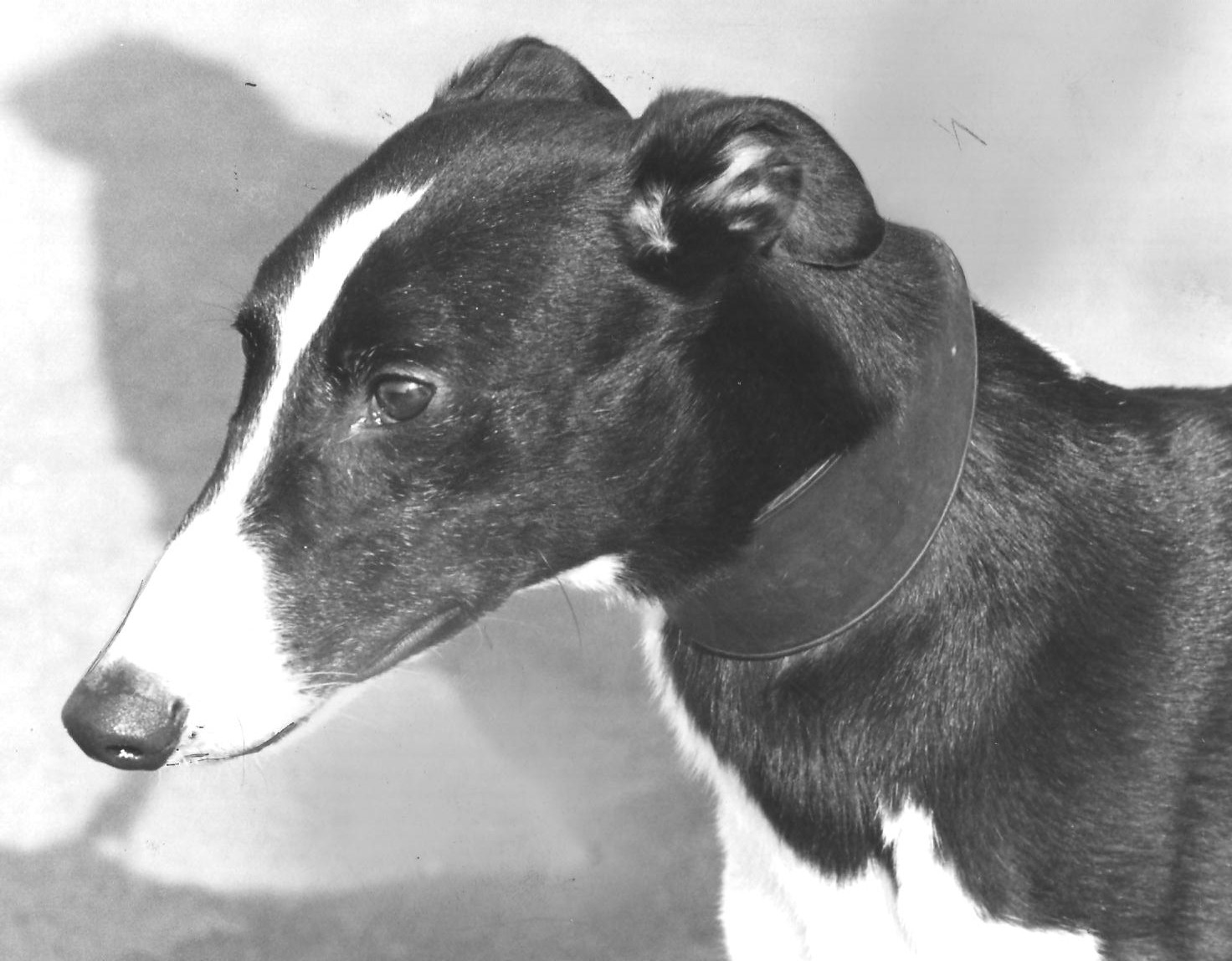
- Lauries Panther
- Location: White City Stadium
- Start date: 25 May
- End date: 26 June
- Total prize money: £25,000 (winner)

The 1982 Spillers Greyhound Derby took place during May and June with the final being held on 26 June 1982 at White City Stadium. The winner was Lauries Panther and the winning owner Laurie James received £25,000. The competition was sponsored by the Spillers for the final time.

== Final result ==
At White City (over 500 metres):

Position	Name of Greyhound	Breeding	Trap	SP	Time	Trainer
1st	Lauries Panther	Shamrock Sailor - Lady Lucey	1	6-4f	29.60	Terry Duggan (Romford)
2nd	Special Account	Westmead County - Ka Boom	4	7-2	29.64	Natalie Savva (Milton Keynes)
3rd	Duke of Hazard	Instant Gambler - All Brown	5	9-2	29.66	John Coleman (Wembley)
4th	Supreme Tiger	Knockrour Tiger - Rising Tide	3	3-1	29.74	Matt O'Donnell (Ireland)
5th	Pineapple Barrow	Ballyard Band - Pineapple Grand	6	16-1	29.78	Michael Compton (Cradley Heath)
6th	Killimy Ivy	Ivy Hall Solo - Corrigeen Echo	2	14-1	00.00	Matt O'Donnell (Ireland)

=== Distances ===
½, head, 1, ½, dis (lengths)
The distances between the greyhounds are in finishing order and shown in lengths. One length is equal to 0.08 of one second.

== Competition Report ==
Parkdown Jet returned in an attempt to defend his title and claim a third consecutive win for Ireland. The British challenge was led by a record £50,000 purchase called Long Spell bought by turkey farmers Ray and Eddie Turner from Irish Breeder Pat Dalton. Ante-post favourite Brief Candle from the Midlands kennels of Paddy Hancox and Laurels champion Lauries Panther were two other leading contenders.

In a qualifying round Lauries Panther defeated Night Miller and set a new track record with 27.72 sec. Supreme Tiger and Fearless Mover went fastest in the first round held on two separate nights but both Brief Candle and Long Spell were eliminated. Geoff De Mulder's Fearless Mover went fastest again in the second round whilst Parkdown Jet and Lauries Panther both remained unbeaten. During the quarter-finals Parkdown Jet qualified by just missing a first bend incident and Lauries Panther won another crowded race that resulted in Fearless Mover and 1981 English Greyhound Derby finalist Clohast Flame both being eliminated.

The first semifinal resulted in a very unusual situation after a dead-heat for third place, and it was left to a toss of a coin to determine who made the final. Luck was with Pineapple Barrow and not Jims Memory (trained by Louis Solomon) who had to be content with standing as reserve for the final. The race had been won by Lauries Panther who still remained unbeaten from Duke of Hazard. The second semi was won by Puppy Derby champion Special Account from Supreme Tiger and Killimy Ivy in a race that saw the defending champion Parkdown Jet finish lame.

In the final Supreme Tiger made the best start but was pursued by Lauries Panther at the first bend who then bumped and knocked over Killimy Ivy with Special Account hampered in the process. Supreme Tiger led until the third bend when Lauries Panther then took the lead and held off a strong finishes by Special Account and Duke of Hazard. Laurie James from Romford had turned down an offer of £70,000 on the day of the final for Lauries Panther.

== Quarter-finals ==
Heat 1 (June 17)
Pos	Name	SP	Time
1st	Crickets Style	10-1	29.72
2nd	Special Account	4-1	29.76
3rd	Pineapple Barrow	7-4f	29.80
4th	Gibilisco	10-1	30.12
5th	Westpark Goldie	5-1	30.66
6th	Tully Prancer	9-4	00.00

Heat 2 (June 17)
Pos	Name	SP	Time
1st	Lauries Panther	9-4	29.45
2nd	Killimy Ivy	25-1	29.55
3rd	Supreme Tiger	3-1	29.63
4th	Fearless Mover	1-1f	29.71
5th	Clohast Flame	20-1	29.81
6th	Yellow Cowboy	33-1	29.97

Heat 3 (June 17)
Pos	Name	SP	Time
1st	Duke of Hazard	9-4	29.93
2nd	Cannondale	5-1	30.09
3rd	Parkdwon Jet	11-10f	30.19
4th	Smart Apprentice	20-1	30.20
5th	Knockrour Rocket	5-1	30.32
6th	The Mill Prince	14-1	30.34

Heat 4 (June 17)
Pos	Name	SP	Time
1st	Huberts Shade	3-1	30.15
2nd	Jims Memory	8-1	30.27
3rd	Kiel Protected	3-1	30.35
4th	Antoinettes Lil	12-1	30.39
5th	Peruvian Queen	4-1	30.87
6th	Crossleigh Fir	7-4f	00.00

== Semifinals ==
First Semifinal (Jun 19)
Pos	Name of Greyhound	SP	Time	Trainer
1st	Lauries Panther	4-7f	29.55	Duggan
2nd	Duke of Hazard	4-1	29.73	Coleman
3rd+	Pineapple Barrow	11-2	29.91	Compton
3rd+	Jims Memory	25-1	29.91	Solomon
5th	Cannondale	10-1	30.09	Cox
6th	Crickets Style	14-1	30.11	Holloway

Second Semifinal (Jun 19)
Pos	Name of Greyhound	SP	Time	Trainer
1st	Special Account	14-1	29.30	Savva
2nd	Supreme Tiger	11-4	29.34	O'Donnell
3rd	Killimy Ivy	2-1	29.54	O'Donnell
4th	Huberts Shade	12-1	29.64	Jackson
5th	Parkdown Jet	7-4f	29.66	McKenna
6th	Kiel Protected	12-1	29.76	Jackson

+ Final qualifying place decided by toss of coin

== See also ==
- 1982 UK & Ireland Greyhound Racing Year
