= Ramsgate Stadium =

Greyhound racing stadium in Ramsgate, England

- Location: Dumpton Park, Hereson Road, Ramsgate
- Coordinates: 51°20′36″N 1°25′46″E
- Opened: 1928
- Closed: 1996

Ramsgate Stadium was a greyhound racing stadium also known as Dumpton Park Stadium in Ramsgate.

== Origins ==
The Greyhound Racing Association (Isle of Thanet) Ltd obtained a plot of land south of Dumpton in the Sir Moses Montefiore Ward and planned to open a greyhound track by 1928. It would be known as Dumpton Park named after the parkland to the north. Part of the Kent Coast Line had recently been replaced by a road called Dumpton Park Drive and the stadium was erected off this road between Muir Road to the south and Montefiore Avenue to the north.

The stadium would be accessed via the Hereson Road and the Tunnel Railway (also known as the Ramsgate Underground Railway) was built around the same time and the narrow gauge railway went directly under the stadium.

== Opening ==
The track opened on Saturday 26 May 1928 and Mrs D Coleman's Southern Surprise (trained by Aden Frank Dandridge) won the first ever race at 3pm over 500 yards at odds of 4-1 in a time of 32.25 secs. The six race card attracted a good crowd with the other winners being trained by W Wyles, Archie Whitcher and R Sandy. Race two went to Merman owned by Mrs Lyne Dixson wife of Major Lyne Dixson, one of the founders of the Greyhound Racing Association (GRA).

The stadium track was described as a well laid out course, 430 yards in circumference with good long straights and easy turns. It had an 'Inside Sumner' hare system and amenities included the Thanet Racing Club, a glass fronted enclosure in the 4s, 6d ring. The kennel facilities were opposite the track adjoining the Dumpton Park railway station.

== Pre war history ==
A second meeting was held on Monday 28 May before the schedule reverted to every Thursday and Saturday. The Director of Racing was Major Dixson and the Racing Manager was Ernest Ledger. Ledger would remain the Racing Manager for over thirty years.

The town of Ramsgate saw a second track built in 1936 known as Newington Greyhound Stadium; the track was situated on the west of Newington Road, just north of Bush Avenue but unlike Dumpton Park never raced under National Greyhound Racing Club rules.

After war was declared Ramsgate suffered major disruption with racing being suspended during 1940.

== Post war history ==
Two trainers brought great success to the track, Jack Daley and Jack Sherry won regular competitions for Ramsgate. Good Worker (Daley) won the 1948 Laurels, Silver Salver, Champion Stakes and Wimbledon Produce Stakes. Blossom of Annagura (Sherry) achieved a notable double winning successive Grand National in 1949 and 1950.

In the 1960s the track policy was to close during the winter months of January and February. The principal event was the Cavalier Cup and ownership of the track was in the hands of the Ramsgate Dumpton Thanet Greyhounds Ltd. J J Foster became Racing Manager from the long serving Ledger and the attached trainers were Sherry, W McKenna, T Cracknell & Jim Barry.

In 1975 trainer Peter Rich former head man to John Coleman won all eight races in one meeting producing a 428,793-1 accumulator.

== Northern Sports ==
A huge turning point for the track materialised in 1976, the stadium had been struggling to attract large crowds due to an ageing stadium and poor facilities but a company called Northern Sports (parent company Hawkins of Harrow) led by former Oaks winning trainer Mick Hawkins and his son David (the Managing Director) purchased the stadium from Dumpton (Thanet) Greyhounds Ltd for £185,000. Mick was also the owner of the independent track Doncaster Greyhound Track.

One year later Jeff Jefcoate left the GRA to join Ramsgate as Racing Manager, J J Foster became Director of Racing and a new race was introduced called the Thanet Gold Cup. Plans were subsequently submitted to the local council for permission to build for a new one million pound grandstand.

Northern Sports purchased Oxford Stadium and Long Eaton Stadium in 1978 and the grandstand was finally completed in 1984. The state of the art facility featured a 200-seater tiered restaurant which became a model for the industry soon afterwards. A sports centre was built within the stadium and included squash, snooker clubs and a gymnasium. Oxford followed suit two years later. Northern Sports and David Hawkins gained many accolades within the industry and both Ramsgate and Oxford profited.

Scurlogue Champ broke the track record in 1985 and the track made two English Greyhound Derby finals with Carrigeen Chimes (Gary Baggs) in 1985 and Sunley Express (Peter Rich) in 1986. Two other Ramsgate trainers Stan Kennett and Ron Luton also had success but Baggs moved to join Oxford in 1986 before diverting to Walthamstow Stadium.

Ramsgate were awarded a lucrative Bookmakers Afternoon Greyhound Service (BAGS) contract after the success of sister track Oxford. Mick Wheble was given the role of BAGS co-ordinator overseeing new Racing Manager Stuart Netting.

The tracks forecourt car park featured as a market set for the BBC's Only Fools and Horses 1989 episode The Jolly Boys Outing.

== Closure ==
As the 1990s progressed Northern Sports parent company Hawkins of Harrow were beginning to suffer from the recession that was affecting their other business interests in construction and garden centres. In 1995 Hawkins of Harrow called in the receivers and Oxford was made a going concern but Ramsgate was sold for redevelopment. Dumpton Park closed its doors in March 1996.

The popular seaside stadium known as the Garden Track of England closed its doors in May 1996. The site today is the Brindle Grove housing.

== Competitions ==
=== Thanet Gold Cup ===
The Thanet Gold Cup was held over 450 metres.

Year	Winner	Breeding	Trainer	Time	SP
1977	Lively March	Kilbeg Kuda – Lively Silver	Tony Dennis (Rochester)	28.31	10-1
1978	Timeless	Time Up Please – Dolores Mary	John Coleman (Wembley)	28.42	4-1
1979	Noon Time	Millies Express – Best Brew	John Sherry (Walthamstow)	28.24	10-11f
1980	Gurrane Purdo	Moonshine Bandit – Ballyhea Queen	John Sherry (Walthamstow)	28.09	7-2
1981	Heres Gay	Tullig Rambler- Lassie Get Lost	Gordon Hodson (Brighton)	28.74	2-1
1982	Westpark Clover	Loyal Expert – Ballinderry Moth	Arthur Boyce (Private)	28.57	12-1
1983	Creamery Cross	Knockrour Slave – Creamery Alice	Allen Briggs (Private)	27.24	4-6f
1984	Cawarra Lad	Glen Rock – Springtime Daf	John Gibbons (Crayford)	27.57	6-1
1985	Big Mac	Yellow Band – Social Outcast	Stan Kennett (Ramsgate)	27.48	5-2f
1986	Ground Speed	Blue Ring – Miss Gift	Ron Luton (Ramsgate)	27.76	11-10f
1987	Glencoe Bestman	Egmont Spider – Green Idol	Peter Rich (Ramsgate)	27.62	4-1
1988	Ballinlough	Alleys Blue – Bernadettes Girl	Dinky Luckhurst (Crayford)	27.63	9-4
1989	General Watson	Yankee Express – Evening Moon	Gordon Hodson (Hove)	28.02	10-11f
1990	Saucy Pup	Dipmac – Anything Fresh	John Gibbons (Crayford)	27.56	9-4
1991	Apres Soleil	Randy – Doras Sunshine	Bill Bookle (Reading)	27.76	1-1f
1992	Poor Brian	Poor James – Ashleigh Fairy	Ron Jeffrey (Reading)	26.95	5-4f
1993	Market Marcher	Balalika – Market Skite	Diane Stinchcombe (Reading)	27.55	5-2
1994	Bunmahon Lad	Druids Johno – Bunmahon Eske	Peter Rich (Romford)	27.11	9-4
1995	Witches Dean	Lyons Dean – Witches Betty	Peter Rich (Romford)		

== Track records ==
Pre-metric

Distance yards	Greyhound	Time (sec)	Date
440	Ashfield Envoy	25.77	5 August 1938
440	Glum	25.70	17 July 1948
460	Tara Beware	26.88	6 April 1960
460	Stedlyn Ploughright	=26.88	29 September 1962
500	Four Mile Bridge	28.74	2 July 1937
500	Good Worker	28.72	6 September 1948
500	Greenane Midas	28.31	31 July 1965
600	Maidens Delight	35.51	18 May 1938
600	Crissie Tanist	35.31	16 July 1947
700	Darts Luck	41.79	17 June 1934
700	Fat Licence	=41.79	20 June 1936
700	Keystone	41.46	13 August 1947
715	Glostello	42.33	19 October 1963
500 H	Honeymans Last	29.80	25 May 1930
500 H	Final Selection	29.40	1970

Post-metric

Distance metres	Greyhound	Time	Date
235	Spartacus	14.89	12.10.1991
235	Oakfront Drive	14.68	11.10.1993
450	Creamery Cross	26.96	02.07.1983
450	Poor Brian	26.95	26.09.1992
590	Hello Blackie	37.28	28.07.1990
590	Coalbrook Susie	37.16	27.07.1991
590	Star Treatment	37.09	12.10.1991
590	Patriot Sail	36.82	05.05.1994
640	General Leader	40.01	26.09.1983
640	Trans Mercedes	39.75	28.07.1990
640	Catsrock Dan	39.71	17.07.1991
840	Loch Bo Anchor	39.68	11.10.1993
855	Scurlogue Champ	54.26	01.07.1985
855	Glenowen Queen	53.95	02.12.1985
1045	Belladare	68.60	19.05.1986
1045	Wayzgoose	68.11	10.05.1992
450 H	For Daniel	27.68	09.10.1989
450 H	Deerpark Jim	27.49	01.08.1992
590 H	Sentimental Sam	38.89	12.10.1991
590 H	Bruces Way	38.23	25.11.1991
590 H	Glenrobin	37.59	16.03.1992
640 H	Freewheel Kylo	40.82	11.10.1993
