= Castleford Whitwood Stadium =

Greyhound racing stadium in England

- Interactive map of Castleford Whitwood Stadium
- Location: Altofts Lane, Whitwood, Castleford
- Coordinates: 53°43′01″N 1°23′49″W
- Field size: 400 metres (originally 400 yards)

Construction
- Opened: 1939
- Closed: 2001

Tenants
- Greyhound racing and speedway

Castleford Whitwood Stadium was a greyhound racing stadium in Altofts Lane, Whitwood, Castleford, England.

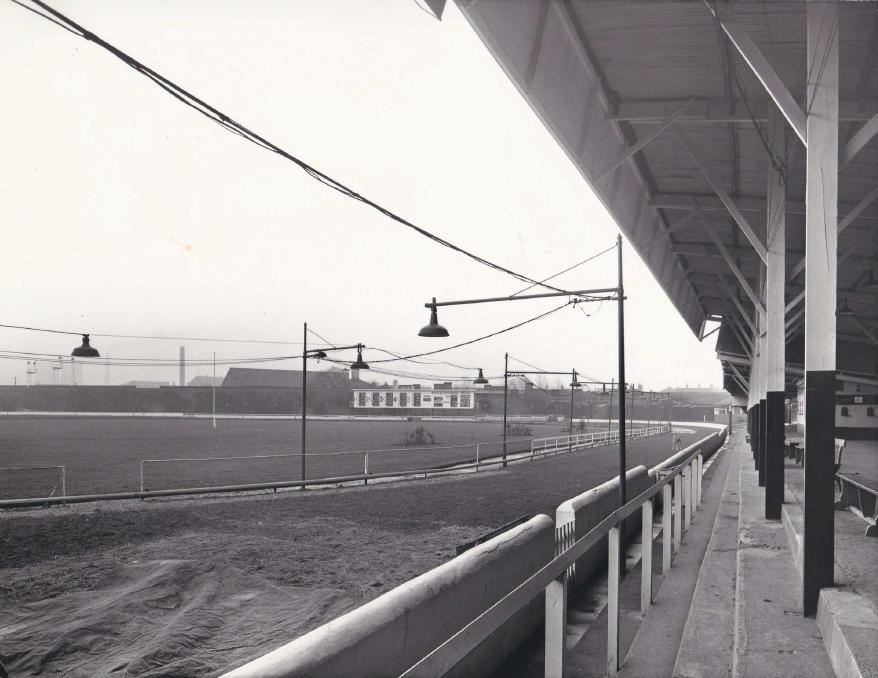
Castleford Whitwood Stadium c. 1960

== Origins ==
In April 1939 William Burrows and John Cain applied for a betting licence for greyhound racing to be held on a plot of land north of Altofts Lane and Whitwood Lane in Whitwood in the urban district of Castleford. The track was known locally as Whitwood and could accommodate 2,500 spectators (500 in a stand and 2,000 around the track).

== History ==
Whitwood ran as an independent track, not licensed by the National Greyhound Racing Club (NGRC) but nevertheless provided decent facilities. By 1960 a social club was built and was able to seat 400 people which resulted in shows being set up on non-race days for the public. A circumference of 400 yards meant that distances of 394 and 504 yards were the measurements for races on the race days of Tuesday and Saturday.

The stadium remained independent for 31 years and also hosted whippets before suffering a long but temporary closure in 1970. However it reopened and from June 1979 to June 1980 speedway was also held at the track, the team was called the Castleford Kings.

In 1980 the track had changed its distances to 280, 370, 485 and 660 metres and was described as an all-sand, D-shaped circuit running mainly handicaps. Facilities included two bars and a tea room; eleven bookmakers were on site betting on Wednesday and Friday evenings at 7:30 pm. Trials were on Sundays and the hare was an 'Inside Sumner'.

Whitwood finally joined the NGRC on 7 October 1985 but would only stay affiliated to them for a short period of time. Generally when independent tracks joined the NGRC, costs would increase forcing some to revert to their former status. On 22 November 1985 Scurlogue Champ smashed the track record over 830 metres, winning by 18 lengths in 54.45sec and priced 1–4. Independent again by 1987 owners John and Carol Hyde changed the track dimensions to 275, 460, 650 and 835 metres with a circumference of 400 metres. The main competitions held at the track were the Whitwood Derby, Whitwood St Leger and Whitwood Rose bowl.

== Closure ==
Many independent tracks were forced to close due to rising costs and Whitwood became one of them. The last meeting was held in February 2001, ending a 62-year association with greyhound racing. A plan to re-open failed after the local council rejected the appeal. The site today forms a small part of the New Wheatsheaf and was to be found reaching a part of the Whitwood golf course.

== Achievements ==
During 1986 trainer Moffat won the Western Two Year Old Produce Stakes with Fulwood Star ensuring the name Whitwood would forever remain in the history of the licensed records lists.

== See also ==
- Greyhound racing
