= Ballyregan Bob =

Greyhound

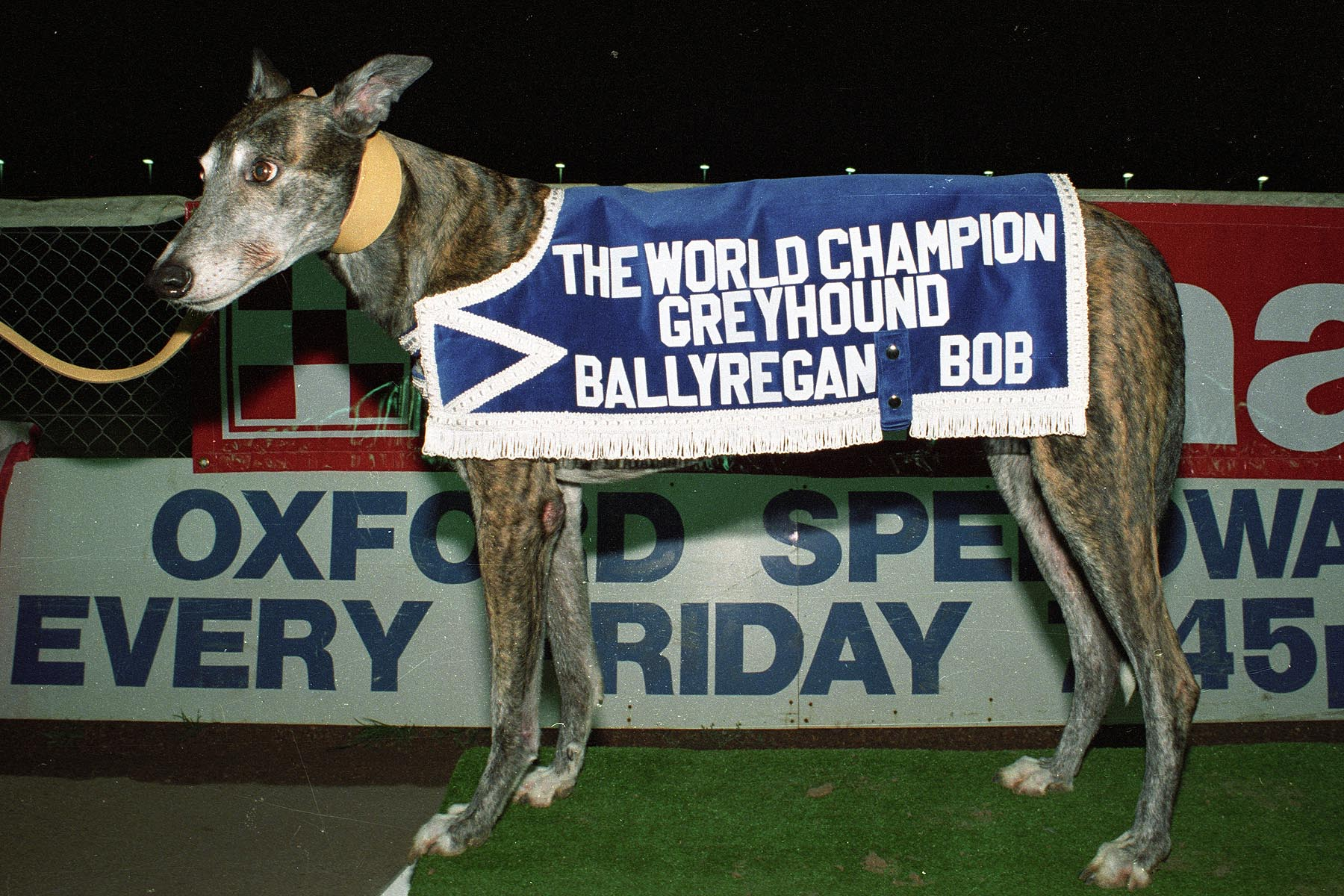
- Ballyregan Bob at Oxford Stadium
- Sire: Ballyheigue Moon
- Dam: Evening Daisy
- Sex: Dog
- Whelped: 12 May 1983
- Died: 3 April 1994 (aged 10)
- Color: Brindle
- Breeder: Robert Cunningham
- Owner: Kevern family
- Trainer: George Curtis (Brighton)

Record
- World record holder (32 consecutive victories)

Other awards
- 1985 Greyhound of the Year; 1986 Greyhound of the Year

Ballyregan Bob (12 May 1983 to 3 April 1994) was a racing greyhound who, along with Mick the Miller and Scurlogue Champ, is one of the most revered racing hounds in British greyhound racing.

Ballyregan Bob was a brindle dog and was whelped in May 1983. Trained by George Curtis he would become world famous for breaking the world record for consecutive race wins.

== Racing career ==
In 1985 Ballyregan Bob won three major events, the Olympic at home track Brighton, the Test at Walthamstow and the Essex Vase at Romford. Whilst winning these events he remained unbeaten and was on his way to setting the world record. He also qualified for the final of the classic race the St Leger at Wembley but was a non runner in the final.

Wins and track records continued to come his way in 1986 until on 9 December he lined up for the Racing Post Challenge at Brighton and duly broke the world record held by American greyhound Joe Dump by winning his 32nd consecutive race.

== Retirement and death ==
After retirement Bob was put to stud and sired many litters. In 1990 he returned from the United States where he had undertaken stud duties and was sent to Germany where he stood with breeder Franz Joseph Gillett, before eventually returning to Britain.

Ballyregan Bob has the unique distinction of being the only dog ever nominated as Guest of Honour at the commissioning of Royal Navy patrol boat HMS Pursuer - an accolade awarded because of the depiction of a greyhound in the ship's badge.

After his death of old age in 1994, the greyhound was exhibited in the Natural History Museum at Tring along with Mick the Miller.

== World record ==
Date 1985	Distance (metres)	Venue	Starting Price	Trap	Win distance (lengths)	Time	Race
May 9	515	Hove	4-11	6	3 ¾	29.63	Olympic Heats
May 11	515	Hove	2-9	6	4 ¼	29.67	Olympic Semi Finals
May 16	515	Hove	2-5	4	1 ½	30.04	Olympic Final
May 28	640	Walthamstow	1-4	6	9 ½	39.40 TR	Test Heats
June 4	640	Walthamstow	1-3	4	13	39.92	Test Semi Finals
June 11	640	Walthamstow	1-4	3	9 ¾	39.59	Test Final
June 22	660	Wimbledon	1-4	6	12	40.43	Derby Final Night Stayers
July 2	575	Romford	4-11	5	Shd	35.48	Essex Vase Heats
July 6	575	Romford	4-7	4	11 ½	35.21	Essex Vase Semi Finals
July 9	575	Romford	1-2	5	2 ¼	35.15 =TR	Essex Vase Final
Aug 19	655	Wembley	4-9	5	3 ¾	40.15	St Leger First Round
Aug 23	655	Wembley	1-3	5	8	39.46 TR	St Leger Second Round
Aug 26	655	Wembley	4-9	5	1	40.56	St Leger Semi Finals
Nov 2	695	Hove	1-8	5	14 ¾	41.13 TR	Open
Nov 9	680	Nottingham	1-4	5	6 ¼	41.87 TR	Open
Nov 16	683	Hackney	1-6	5	8	42.24 TR	Open
Nov 23	660	Wimbledon	1-6	6	7 ½	40.35 TR	Open
Nov 30	715	Sheffield	1-7	6	20	44.41	Open
Dec 6	688	Harringay	2-7	6	14	41.94 TR	Open
Dec 12	710	Wembley	4-9	4	11 ¾	42.63 TR	John Power Showdown
Dec 21	740	Hove	3-10	5	9	44.65	Invitation

Date 1986	Distance (metres)	Venue	Starting Price	Trap	Win distance (lengths)	Time	Race
Mar 22	695	Hove	None	5	11 ¾	42.21	Open
Apr 2	655	Wembley	1-8	5	9 ½	39.57	Trainers Championship
Apr 10	680	Nottingham	1-7	5	3	41.99	Open
Apr 19	660	Wimbledon	1-9	5	13 ¾	40.15 TR	Open
Apr 26	650	Powderhall	1-10	5	14 ¼	39.60 TR	Open
May 8	670	Brough Park	1-9	5	15	41.15 TR	Open
May 17	660	Wimbledon	1-5	5	5 ¾	40.23	Racing Post International
Nov 13	695	Hove	1-5	6	9	42.36	S1 Graded
Nov 21	688	Harringay	1-7	4	10 ½	42.00	Open
Nov 28	688	Harringay	1-10	5	16	41.74 TR	Open
Dec 9	695	Hove	1-4	6	9 ¼	42.04 TR	Racing Post Challenge

== Pedigree ==
Lively Band
Yellow Band
Monalee Peg
Ballyheigue Moon
Newdown Heather
Heather Suzie
Suzie Gaye
Ballyregan Bob
Monalee Champion
Here Sonny
Handbag
Evening Daisy
Spectre
Airdrie Hill
Yurituni

== See also ==
- List of individual dogs
