= Dolores Rocket =

English racing greyhound

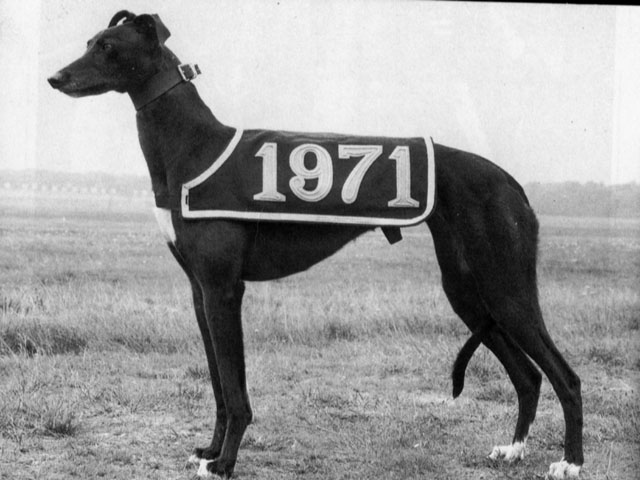
- Sire: Newdown Heather
- Dam: Come On Dolores
- Sex: Bitch
- Whelped: March 1969
- Color: Black
- Breeder: Ernie Gaskin Sr.
- Owner: Herbert White
- Trainer: Herbert White

Major wins
- St Leger; Juvenile; Essex Vase; Wembley Spring Cup

Other awards
- Greyhound of the Year

Honours
- 1971 English Greyhound Derby champion

Dolores Rocket was a famous racing greyhound during the 1970s. She is regarded as being one of the leading racing greyhounds in history and won the sports ultimate prize, the English Greyhound Derby.

== Mating ==
Ernie Gaskin's brood bitch Come on Dolores was sent to Jack Mullan in Ireland to be mated with Ireland's leading sire at the time, Newdown Heather, which led to their subsequent litter being registered as Irish bred, despite the fact that they were actually whelped in the UK. It is even possible that the litter were sired by Monalee Champion because she was put with him three days later under the presumption that the first mating was unsuccessful. The Irish Coursing Club however had already processed the original paperwork. Come on Dolores (in whelp) returned to England and Gaskin sold her to Bert, Len, John and Arthur White (four decorating brothers from Brookwood in Surrey) for £375. Gaskin had sold her due to recent death of his father (also Ernest Gaskin).

== Rearing ==
Come on Dolores whelped a litter of seven at Herbert 'Bert' White's Brookwood Kennels during March 1969. White sold the litter, with the exception of a black bitch called Dolores Rocket and reared her until she was ready to race.

== Racing ==
The black bitch won her first event, the Puppy Oaks at Wimbledon Stadium, in a fast time of 28.31 seconds. She then won the Sporting Life Puppy Championship and Juvenile in 1970.

Dolores Rocket won the Spring Cup over 700 yards at Wimbledon Stadium, set a track record at Crayford & Bexleyheath Stadium before victory in the Wembley Spring Cup. After seasonal rest she headed for the 1971 English Greyhound Derby and won the competition and became the first bitch to win the Derby since 1949.

After the Derby she broke the track record at Romford Greyhound Stadium when winning the Essex Vase on 6 July and broke the 700 yard track record at Wimbledon on 26 July. Later in 1971 she also won the St Leger at Wembley and reached the Cesarewitch final at West Ham Stadium. She earned £15,044 in career prize money which constituted a new record.

== Litter ==
Dolores Rocket's litter brother Come On Wonder broke track records at West Ham (550 yards) and Crayford (700 yards) before being disqualified and going on to race on the independent circuits winning the Henlow Derby and Ashfield St Leger.

== Pedigree ==
Hi There
Printer's Prince
Sally's Gossip
Newdown Heather
The Grand Champion
Pardee
Manhattan Heiress
Dolores Rocket
Galtee Cleo
Knock Hill Chieftain
Coolkill Mistress
Come On Dolores
The Grand Fire
Sultry Peach
Rockaleen
