= Scurlogue Champ =

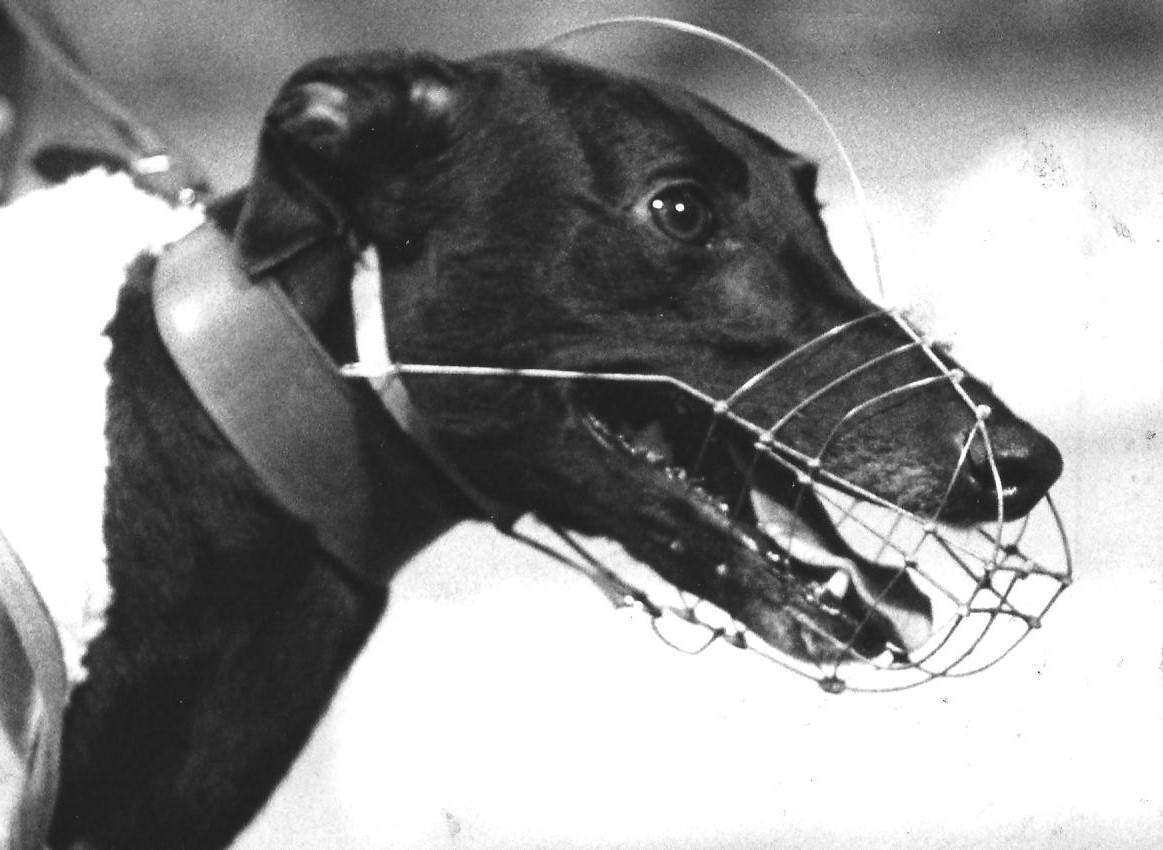
- Sire: Sand Man
- Dam: Old Rip
- Sex: Dog
- Whelped: July 1982
- Died: 1996/1997 (aged 14)
- Color: Black
- Breeder: Francis Kent
- Owner: Ken Peckham/D Folan
- Trainer: Ken Peckham / George Drake

Record
- Cesarewitch winner Twice TV Trophy champion 20 track records

Scurlogue Champ is a famous racing greyhound from the 1980s. Along with Mick the Miller and Ballyregan Bob he is arguably one of the greatest three hounds that ever raced in Britain.

== Early life ==
Scurlogue Champ was a black dog whelped in July 1982 by Sand Man, out of Old Rip. He was bred by Francis Kent from Levittstown, County Wexford and was one of a litter of six dogs and two bitches. He moved to John Byrne, Scurlogue, Duncormick, County Wexford on a farm where he received his name before being sold to Jim Sutton, New Ross, County Wexford, who reared him on his farm.

After winning his only two races in Ireland, the first over 525yds in Waterford and the second shortly after over 600yds in Enniscorthy when trained by Patrick Sutton, he was put up for sale at the May 1984 Shelbourne Park sales where he won his 600yds trial. Owner/trainer Ken Peckham took him to England, after agreeing a price for £1,700, with Irish trainer Brendan Matthews who had bought him before entering the sales ring for 1500 guineas.

== Racing career ==
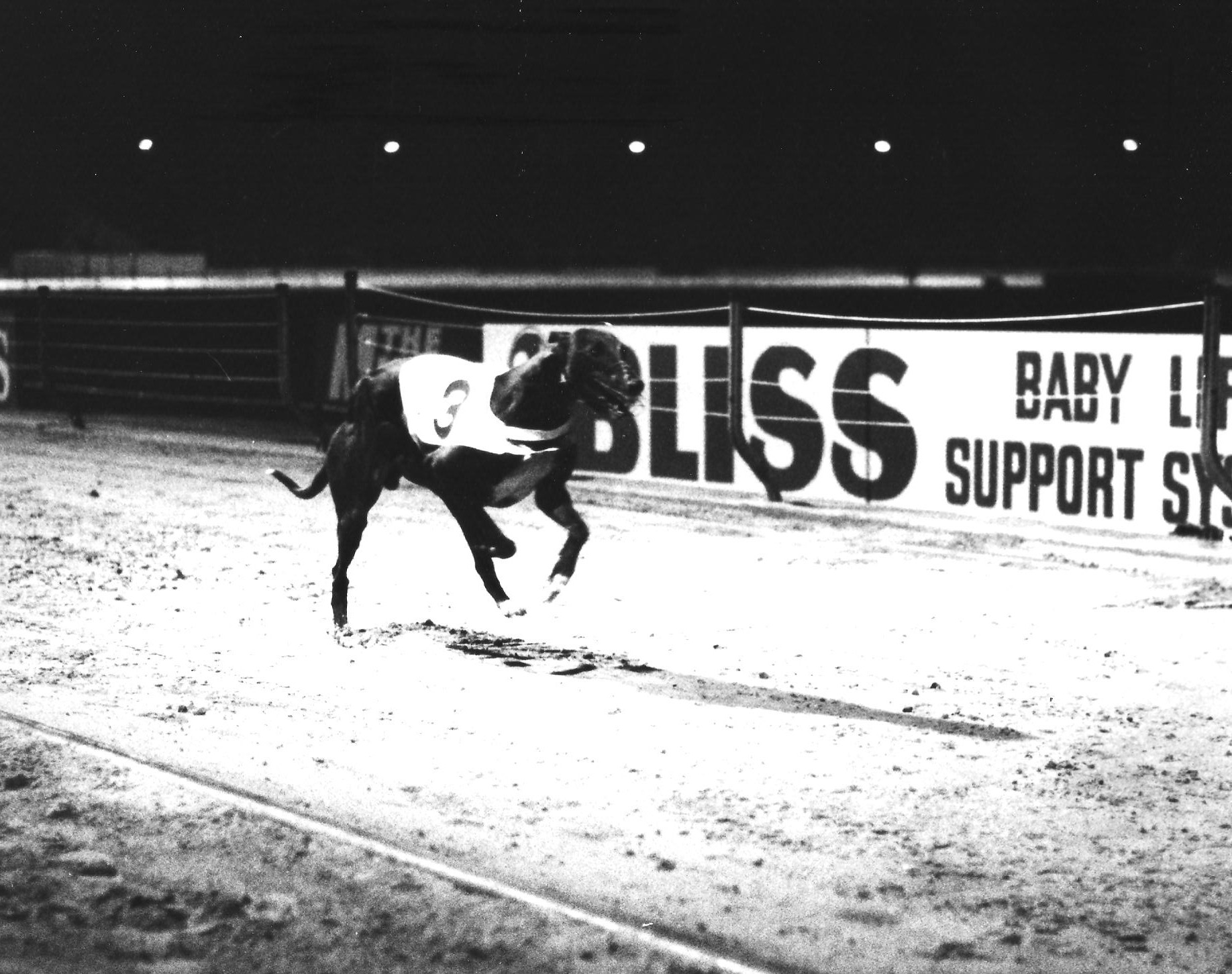
Scurlogue Champ in action

He was handled by trainer Ken Peckham for the majority of his career but also spent some time with George Drake (as a result of an NGRC order that he ran in Drakes name for the Cesarewitch. The NGRC had visited Drake's kennels and found the dog in residence there, instead of being with owner Ken Peckham at his kennels).

Scurlogue Champ would be renowned for the strongest finishes ever seen over long distance racing. The crowds would adore him and could not believe how he could win his races from being so far behind.

He won the Cesarewitch in 1985 and the BBC Television Trophy in 1985 and 1986. The superstar finished with a record of 51 wins from 63 races and set twenty track records.

== Scurlogue Champ's 20 track records ==
| Date 1984 | Distance (metres) | Venue | Starting Price | Trap | Win distance (lengths) | Time |
|---|---|---|---|---|---|---|
| Sep 19 | 810 | Ipswich | 4-6f | 6 | 6 ½ | 51.44 |
| Oct 20 | 718 | Catford | 1-1f | 1 | 8 ½ | 45.58 |
| Nov 23 | 688 | Harringay | 4-7f | 4 | 6 ¼ | 42.50 |
| Dec 1 | 815 | Hall Green | 1-2f | 5 | 15 ¼ | 52.51 |

| Date 1985 | Distance (metres) | Venue | Starting Price | Trap | Win distance (lengths) | Time |
|---|---|---|---|---|---|---|
| Feb 27 | 663 | Hall Green | 11-10f | 4 | Nk | 41.56 |
| Mar 2 | 750 | Romford | 4-11f | 6 | 8 ¾ | 46.80 |
| Apr 16 | 715 | Romford | 1-2f | 5 | 4 | 44.18 |
| May 15 | 815 | Monmore | 1-3f | 5 | 13 ¼ | 51.80 |
| May 22 | 815 | Monmore | 1-5f | 5 | 9 ¾ | 51.64 |
| June 5 | 888 | Catford | 2-13f | 6 | 15 ½ | 58.00 |
| June 11 | 825 | Brough Park | 1-8f | 4 | 11 | 52.62 |
| July 1 | 855 | Ramsgate | 1-5f | 6 | 6 | 54.26 |
| Sep 21 | 853 | Belle Vue | 4-7f | 6 | 10 | 54.78 |
| Sep 28 | 853 | Belle Vue | 1-3f | 6 | 6 | 54.62 |
| Oct 17 | 754 | Nottingham | 2-5f | 5 | 4 | 47.30 |
| Nov 16 | 764 | Derby | 1-3f | 3 | 19 ¾ | 49.04 |
| Nov 22 | 830 | Whitwood (Castleford) | 1-4f | 6 | 18 | 54.45 |

| Date 1986 | Distance (metres) | Venue | Starting Price | Trap | Win distance (lengths) | Time |
|---|---|---|---|---|---|---|
| Apr 23 | 825 | Brough Park | 1-3f | 4 | 7 | 52.26 |
| June 19 | 888 | Catford | 1-3f | 3 | 8 | 57.60 |
| July 12 | 855 | Poole | 4-11f | 2 | 8 | 54.86 |

== Pedigree ==
My Friend Lou
Friend Westy
Westy Blubber
Sand Man
Tell You Why
Miss Gorgeous
Miss Dilly Mar
Scurlogue Champ
Newdown Heather
MotorLight
Marillis
Old Rip
Sirius
Old Bib
Monalee Peg

== See also ==
- List of individual dogs
