= Southend Stadium =

Former sports venue in Southrnd-on-Sea, Essex, England

Coordinates: 51°32′39.88″N 0°42′53.95″E

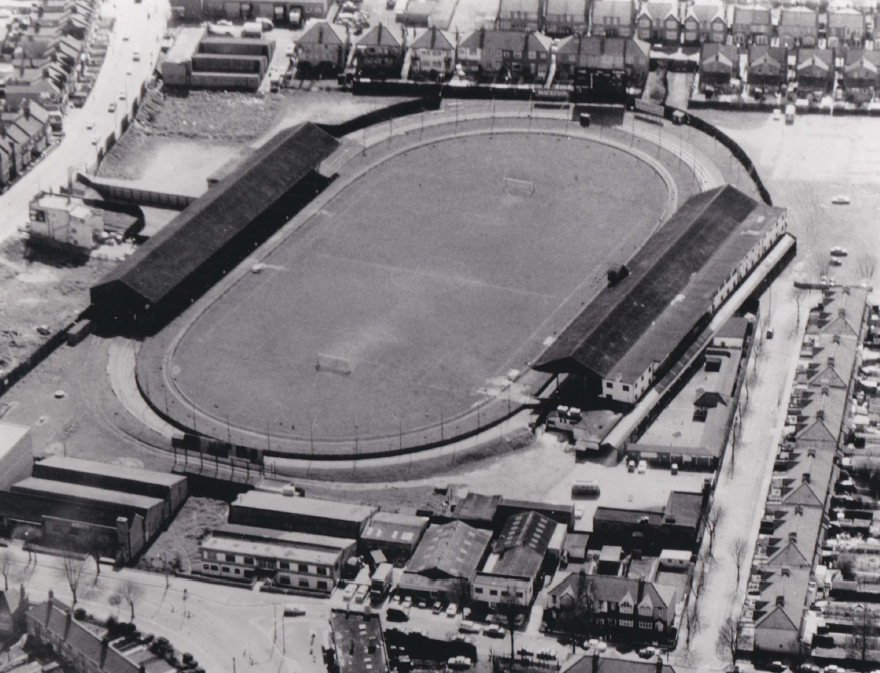
- Interactive map of Southend Stadium
- Location: Grainger Road, Southend-on-Sea, Essex

Construction
- Opened: 15 April 1933
- Closed: 26 December 1985

Southend Stadium was a former greyhound racing and football stadium in Grainger Road, Southend-on-Sea, Essex. It was also the home ground of Southend United between 1934 and 1955 and was also known as Greyhound Park or Grainger Road.

== Origins ==
The first greyhound racing in Southend took place at the Kursaal from 1927 until 1928, when the English Football League banned it from the ground due to the track damaging the pitch. Three years later in 1932 planning permission for a new stadium was submitted to the Southend Council by a new company called Southend Stadium Ltd headed by the Wimbledon supremo William John Cearns.

The new stadium was built on the site of the Milton Hall Brickworks in the All Saints Ward and featured two main stands, the east stand which would later have a restaurant and the west stand with covered seating, the remainder of the stadium being uncovered terracing. The Milton Hall Brick Company Ltd had just opened the Star Lane Brickworks in the nearby village of Great Wakering allowing the sale of the older Brickworks located between the Redstock Road to the north, Maldon Road to the south and Sutton Road on its east side. After the stadium had been constructed it could be accessed from the new Stadium Road via Redstock Road or from Grainger Road via Maldon Road.

== Opening ==
The stadium opened on Saturday 15 April 1933 and attracted an attendance of over 5,000. The first ever race was won by a greyhound called Janet McNab over 525 yards, the greyhound won by 5 lengths in a time of 32.22 secs.

== Pre war history ==
Meetings took place on Monday afternoon in addition to Wednesday and Friday evening. Distances used in the early years of racing were 300, 500 and 525 yards including hurdles. The Thames Silver Salver was inaugurated in 1933 and became an established competition that would attract some of the sports best sprinters in future years.

In 1934 Southend United F.C. relocated the club from the Kursaal to the Southend Stadium in a complete reversal of proceedings that had taken place in 1927. A seven-year lease had been agreed despite reservations from the Football Association. The Racing Manager was T F Fenton-Livingstone and the timekeeper was Les Cox who would later become Racing Manager at Romford Greyhound Stadium.

The circuit was 465 yards in circumference and was described as a particularly easy galloping track with good straights which gradually merge into the banked bends. The hare system was an 'Outside Sumner' and the racing kennels were located behind the east stand that now included a restaurant and the Greycing Club with dance floor. Below the east stand Greycing Club was the Junior Greycing Club and cheaper enclosure. The residential kennels were to be found seven miles away in the village of Canewdon.

Some of the earliest trainers at the track included J Bartlett, Stan Gray, A.F Dandridge and Frank Clarke, the latter left the stadium in 1937 to be replaced by Bill Cowell. Cowell won the Scurry Gold Cup and Lincoln Stakes with Hexham Bridge in 1937 whilst Stan Gray trained Happy Squire an Essex Vase success in 1939. Jim Syder Jr. trained at the track for eleven years from 1935 to 1946 before joining Wembley Greyhounds.

== Post war history ==
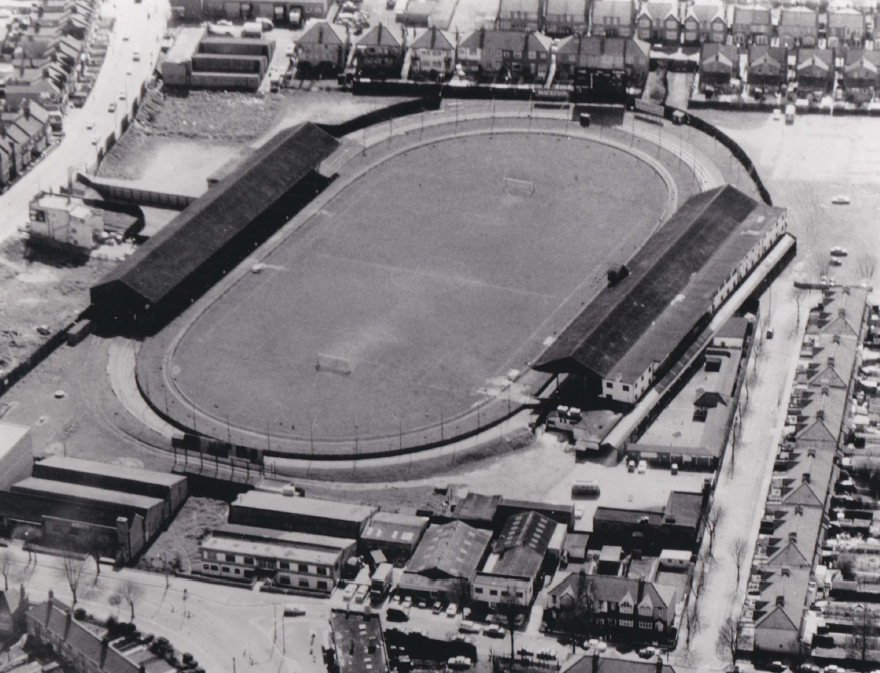
Southend Stadium c.1950

The vast majority of tracks continued to trade throughout the war but Southend had been requisitioned by the Army Officer Training Corps in 1940 leaving the football team and greyhound racing without a home.

When hostilities ceased in 1945 the stadium was in need of major repairs and the pitch had to be re-laid before the football team could play again. Greyhound racing returned during April 1946. The totalisator peaked in 1948 at £1,694,181 during a boom period for the industry.

A rival track called the Rayleigh Weir Stadium opened in 1948. Mr A Gray became Racing Manager and in 1955 the football team decided not to renew the lease and left for Roots Hall. Trainer Bill Matthews won the Thames Silver Salver for his home track in 1955.

The 1960s saw racing held three times a week racing on Monday, Thursday and Saturday and the stadium regularly closed from January to March. The hare system changed to an 'Outside McKee'. There were five buffet bars and two licensed bars listed in the facilities during a time when Arthur Hall became General Manager and Terry Evans replaced A Gray as Racing Manager.

In the late 1960s and early 1970s the trainers were Stan Gray, Dennis Mansfield, Bill Matthews and Bert Stephens, Kenny Linzell had a spell at track as well. In August 1970 the BBC screened the annual Television Trophy at the track; it was the first time that colour was used. A new stand was constructed with a new tiered restaurant which brought increased attendances and tote turnover but proposals for a new track to be laid inside the greyhound track for speedway and stock cars was refused by the council over noise concerns.

Stan Gray retired in 1971 replaced by Tony Barker and new trainer Tom Lanceman who also supplied runners to Ipswich Stadium was one of the first trainers to take dual attachment. In 1979 Lanceman's Topofthetide won the Grand National for the second successive year. The stadium introduced the Coronation Cup in 1981 and Tony Dennis won the Grand Prix with Rathduff Solara.

== Closure ==
The last meeting was held on Boxing Day 1985. Two months later the stands and terracing were demolished making way for a retail park.

== Competitions ==
- Thames Silver Salver
- Coronation Cup

== Track records ==
Pre-metric

Distance yards	Greyhound	Time (sec)	Date	Notes/ref
300	Westerham	17.07	24 October 1934	
300	Royal Canopy	16.90	2 August 1948	
300	Hi Tivoli	16.45	31 July 1961	Thames Silver Salver final
300	Don’'t Gambol		1971	Thames Silver Salver semi final
500	Happy Form	28.84	6 October 1933	
500	Lone Keel	28.34	3 May 1937	
500	Mondays News	28.22	1945	
500	Shannon Shore	27.89	25 September 1946	Thames Silver Salver final
500	Red Wind	27.78	19 September 1949	Thames Silver Salver final
525	Lutwyche	30.18	28 July 1933	
525	Happy Form	30.18	25 October 1933	=equalled
525	Light of Castledown	29.99	21 June 1946	
525	Rimmels Black	29.57	1947	
525	Royal Canopy	29.49	17 May 1948	
525	Tinas Beauty	29.43	8 July 1965	
525	Willing Blue	29.22	1970	
700	Ever Bonny	41.30	3 November 1933	
700	Diamond Jim	40.55	26 June 1946	
700	Aura Monarch	40.07	29 June 1948	
700	Drastic O'Leer	40.04	1949	
700	Lucky Hi There	39.82	21 September 1964	Charles Neale Stakes
700	Rita's Choice		July 1973	
750	Bradshaw Jim	44.12	25 July 1936	
963	Greenville Flora	57.16	6 December 1969	
500 H	Kilmoney Prince	29.73	11 August 1933	
500 H	Macaroni II	29.64	24 June 1936	
500 H	Carraigin Robairt	28.84	14 June 1948	
500 H	Sprightly Peter	28.72	1948	
525 H	Kilmoney Prince	31.17	31 July 1933	
525 H	Terrys Hope	31.05	24 May 1937	
525 H	O'Alaha	30.31	30 June 1948	
700 H	Inchacoumbe Boy	43.09	29 September 1933	
700 H	Flying Wedge	41.98	10 April 1937	

Post-metric

Distance metres	Greyhound	Time (sec)	Date	Notes/ref
277	Mutts Silver	16.71	1976	Thames Silver Salver final
277	Knockrour Brandy	16.45	2 July 1979	
484	My Royal	29.03	30 April 1979	
484	Fosters Folly	29.03	12 June 1980	
647	Montini's Flash	39.67	1 November 1979	
705	Billys Glory	43.97	22 August 1974	
913	Maldon West	57.66	12 August 1978	
462 H	Graceful Fellow	28.61	26 May 1973	
484 H	Shyan Trader	29.94	26 May 1979	
