= Harringay Stadium =

Former greyhound racing venue in London, England

Coordinates: 51.576978°N 0.0952712°W

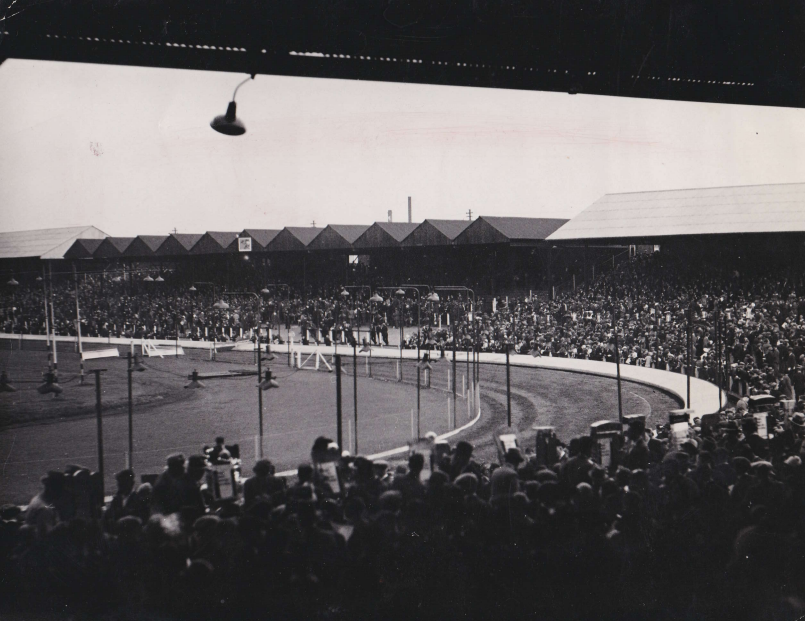
- Harringay Stadium in the 1950s
- Interactive map of Harringay Stadium
- Location: Harringay, London
- Operator: Greyhound Racing Association

Construction
- Opened: 1927
- Closed: 1987

Harringay Stadium was a major greyhound racing and motorcycle speedway venue in Harringay, north London. It was built and opened in 1927 and closed in 1987.

Harringay Stadium was the third greyhound racing stadium to open in Britain. It was owned by the Greyhound Racing Association Ltd (GRA). After great success with their first track at Belle Vue in Manchester in 1926, they opened both White City and Harringay stadiums in 1927.

The driving force behind the GRA, and its managing director until the 1960s, was Brigadier-General Alfred Critchley, who wrote in his autobiography that, when he first learned of greyhound racing, "It immediately occurred to me that this might prove to be the poor man's racecourse". Apparently his interest in how the lower-paid classes were losing money by backing horses was born out of concern for his valet who lost large sums betting on horse racing.

== Site history ==
The 23-acre (93,000 m^{2}) site was used for the Williamson's Pottery Works from the late 18th century through to the early 1900s. In the mid-nineteenth century, it was used for the deposit of the spoils from the construction of the Hornsey Wood Reservoir in Finsbury Park, an arrangement that benefitted both the owners of the potteries and the firm excavating the reservoir. Then in the early 20th century, the site was in unauthorised use by Stoke Newington Council for dumping the borough's rubbish. and as deposit site for some of the soil excavated during the construction of the Piccadilly line as far as Finsbury Park. Ten years later, in 1912-13 it was under consideration by Woolwich Arsenal Football Club for their new ground, but they quickly settled on the Highbury site for its better transport connections, leaving the way open for the Stadium.

== Construction ==
Acquired by the Greyhound Racing Association by 1926, due to the immense amount of soil dumped from the various excavations further south, the site had to be cleared of 40,000 tons of waste before any construction could begin, a task involving 300 workmen over two months.

The stadium building was constructed by Messrs T.G. Simpson of Victoria Street, London, at a cost of £35,000. On completion, the rather awkward structure had a capacity of 50,000. The main stand running along the north of the site seated 3,000. The remaining 47,000 spectators were accommodated on terracing constructed on earth banking which remained from the earth spoils.

There were a number of additions to the stadium in the years after construction, including a number of smaller stands around the track and the construction of a restaurant in the main stand. One of the most renowned additions was the Australian-invented Julius totalisator. This electro-mechanical computer, installed in 1930 and extended and upgraded in 1948, saw continuous service until the stadium was closed in 1987.

== Greyhound racing ==
=== Opening ===
The opening night was on Tuesday 13 September 1927 and drew in a crowd of 35,000, and the racing was dampened by persistent rain all evening. The opening race was the Chorley Wood Stakes, and it was won by Baltard Castle over 500 yards in a time of 30.80 sec at 3–1 for trainer Sid Jennings. Another greyhound racing that evening was Ever Bright trained by John 'Jack' Kennedy and although only finishing third he would finish as runner-up in the 1927 English Greyhound Derby less than one month later. The original trainers were Kennedy, Jennings, William Spoor, Harry Buck and Reginald Grey. Track lighting was seen as a first-time experience by most (football did not have floodlights for another 30 years).

=== Pre war history ===
In 1927 the GRA set up the Hook estate at Northaw for GRA trainers to train out off for White City Stadium and Harringay. The 140 acres of park and grassland was used for greyhounds over nine months old and could house 600 dogs. The pups under nine months were reared under the supervision of William Skerratt on farms in and around Blythe Bridge near Stoke-on-Trent before graduating to Northaw.

Bendeemer trained by Jack Kennedy finished fourth in the 1928 English Greyhound Derby final before the Mick the Miller appeared at Harringay for the only time in 1929. He defeated the Billy Chandler (grandfather of Victor Chandler) owned Bishops Dream in a match race on 11 December.

Two further Greyhound Derby final appearances in 1931 and 1932 by Brunswick Bill and Fret Not respectively were followed by the arrival of two trainers called Leslie Reynolds and Jack Harvey; the latter would provide Harringay with their first Derby champion in Davesland in the 1934 English Greyhound Derby.

The track was the first to race a steeplechase in 1934, which featured a hurdle, a water jump, a collapsible dummy brick wall and a brushwood hedge. The steeplechase failed to become a permanent fixture in the industry.

The prestigious Pall Mall Stakes was set up in 1935 and became Harringay's feature competition. Shove Halfpenny, the first winner of the Pall Mall, switched kennels to Jack Harvey in 1937, finishing runner-up in the Derby final, and Eddie Wright steered Carmel Ash to second place in the 1939 Derby final.

With the advent of war, major competitions were badly hit, with many postponed until 1945; the 1940 Greyhound Derby was affected after White City cancelled the event despite the fact that it had already started on 15 June. The race was moved to Harringay, a move that did not go down well with many within the industry, and the press described it as being the forgotten Derby. Racing was restricted during the next four years, with Saturday matinee meetings being the only fixtures.

=== Postwar history ===
In 1948 the popular totalisator board underwent extensive improvements, with the small stand next to the board being demolished and the tote doubled in size, displaying results automatically. Tote turnover in 1946 was a massive £11,046,994 second only to White City.

In the 1950s the grandstand received a glass front to accommodate a restaurant and offered 14 buffet bars and 10 licensed bars. Such was Harringay's reputation that in the 1950s Sporting Life called the track "the best running circuit in Britain". In 1957 Racing Manager Harold Ingleton retired and was replaced by Ken Obee from Stamford Bridge. In 1959 the Oaks was switched to Harringay from White City.

In 1961 the track heating system was introduced with electric cables sewn into the track by the tractor and a team of workers about eight inches under the turf. They would prove to be useful until the advent of all sand tracks. The track was able to use two hares, an 'Outside McGee' and 'Outside Sumner' and small hurdle races described as chases. Harringay held Bookmakers Afternoon Greyhound Service (BAGS) meetings from 1967 after being chosen as one of the tracks to host the service.

In late 1968 the stadium underwent a facelift with new stands, a new track surface with improved banking, and new distances of 450, 725, and 900 yards. Trainer Peter Hawkesley replaced the retiring Wilf France in 1970 and Jimmy Keane replaced Frank Melville in 1971 after he left for Rochester. In 1971 eight dog racing was trialed and one year later Harringay dogs had a brief spell of fame when the stadium became the home of Greyhound racing on London Weekend Television's World of Sport between 1972 and 1982.

Peter George (right) of Ladbrokes with a colleague and a greyhound at a Ladbrokes cheque presentation, Harringay, 1977

Westpark Mustard completed win number seven on her way to 20 consecutive wins in 1974 and a new major competition called the Golden Jacket was inaugurated at the track in 1975. Ballyregan Bob appeared during December 1985 and twice in November 1986, all three wins formed part of the magical 32 world record (two of them track records).

=== Decline and closure ===
By 1986 plans to sell most of the site had been announced and the managing director of the GRA, Charles Chandler, promised a new, smaller stadium on the site, modelled on the Stamford Bridge track. The plan failed to materialise. In 1987 the GRA was taken over by Wembley plc, and with the 23-acre site of the stadium valued at £1 million per acre the sale plans accelerated. The last greyhound meeting was held on 25 September 1987. and the last winner was 6–1 shot Davdor Darra. The famous totalisator board was dismantled and parts of it went to the Science Museum at Wroughton, Swindon. The stadium, which was acquired by the local council and McAlpine Homes, was subject to various appeals before being demolished and making way for 220 homes and a Sainsbury's superstore.

=== Competitions ===
- The Oaks (an original classic race)
- Pall Mall Stakes
- Golden Jacket
- National Sprint
- Produce Stakes

=== Track records ===
==== Pre Metric records ====
Distance (yards)	Greyhound	Time	Date	Notes
440	Houghton Spur	24.66	1968	
450	Gun Black	24.74	1970	
500	Demotic Mack	28.46	1946	
500	Welcome Home	28.41	20 March 1961	
525	Fish Hill	29.40	1946	
525	Polonius	29.22	1956	
525	Pigalle Wonder	29.03	24 November 1958	
525	Cranog Bet	29.02	6 July 1964	
525	Shady Parachute	28.89	July 1968	
525	Yellow Printer	28.71	4 November 1968	Pall Mall heats
525	Yellow Printer	28.60	8 November 1968	Pall Mall semi-finals
525	Always Present	28.54	28 March 1969	
525	That Cailin	28.47	1970	
525	Camira Story	28.39	1970	
525	TJs Silver	28.32	1973	
650	Westpark Larch	37.12	26 July 1965	
650	Summer Guest		25 July 1966	
650	Brinmark Fire	36.80	1968	
700	Chain Mail	41.32	1931	
700	Mick's Fancy	41.20	9 September 1931	
700	Alvaston Lulu Belle	40.44	1946	
700	Noreview King	40.24	24 November 1958	
700	Westpark Quail	39.69	15 February 1965	
725	Cullen Era	40.27	1968	
725	Coldwells	40.15	28 March 1969	
725	Houghton Tango	39.92	1970	
880	Tugwell	52.64	1946	
880	Greenane Airlines	52.08	28 September 1959	
880	Boothroyden Larry	51.15	7 December 1964	
880	Gezira	51.09	1968	
880	Hiver Whitenose	50.43	1970	
900	Breach's Biscuit	52.36	1968	
900	Greenville Fauna	51.86	28 March 1969	
900	Breach's Biscuit	51.80	7 April 1969	
900	Coldwell's	51.57	May 1969	
900	Booked Six	51.56	May 1969	
900	Greenville Fauna	51.29	1970	
900	Country Maiden	51.16	1972	
963	The Popular Streak	56.72	11 May 1959	
966	Boothroyden Larry	56.49	19 October 1964	
500 H	Kilganny Bridge	29.53	1946	
525 H	Juvenile Classic	30.24	1946	
525 H	Dark General	30.22	1950	
525 H	Blue Sand	29.81	24 October 1956	
525 H	Sherrys Prince	29.02	1972	
525 Chase	Fodda Champion	30.36	1 April 1957	
525 Chase	Ballinagree	30.14	27 October 1963	
700 H	Misty Bridge	41.61	11 August 1958	
700 H	Fawn Buffalo	40.79	20 September 1965	

==== Post Metric records ====
Distance (metres)	Greyhound	Time	Date	Notes
272	Very Attractive	16.15	25 June 1984	
272	Fearless Action	15.93	25 November 1985	
414	Sampsons Pal	24.77	31 August 1979	
414	Ballybeg Sport	24.60	04.09.1981	National Sprint final
475	House Party	28.37	23 October 1978	
475	Yankee Express	28.22	28 October 1983	
475	Castlelyons Cash	28.85	14 May 1986	
475	Fearless Swift	28.43	25 July 1986	
660	Drynham Star	40.14	21 February 1976	
660	Howl On Roger	41.38	5 October 1979	
688	Scurlogue Champ	42.50	23 November 1984	
688	Ballyregan Bob	41.94	6 December 1985	
688	Ballyregan Bob	41.74	28 November 1986	
830	Miss Kilkenny	51.79	3 October 1977	
891	Welsh Cobbler	56.38	3 November 1978	
891	Westmead Light	56.23	4 September 1981	
891	Jos Gamble	56.23	28 October 1983	
475 H	Derby Wonder	29.13	23 February 1980	
475 H	Westlands Steve	29.13	13 December 1980	
660 H	Howl on Rodger	41.38	5 October 1979	

== Cheetah racing at Harringay ==
In 1937, Harringay Stadium was part of a scheme by the owner of the Romford Stadium, Arthur Leggett, to increase attendance at his venue. Twelve cheetahs were imported into the UK from Kenya in December 1936 by explorer Kenneth Gandar-Dower. After six months' quarantine the cheetahs were given a year to acclimatise and for training at Harringay and Staines stadia. The cheetahs ran in public for the first time to a packed house at the Romford track, on Saturday, 11 December 1937. Two races were held.

The experiment failed and the racing stopped because although the cheetahs were able to better the greyhound times they had to be let off first when racing greyhounds and when they raced against each other they became disinterested and stopped chasing the lure.

== Speedway ==
A speedway track was laid inside the greyhound track and speedway events began at Harringay Stadium on 29 May 1928, three months after the first speedway event was held in the United Kingdom. After four years, with mixed success, the events were discontinued. However, they resumed in 1935 and, after a break during the war, speedway events ran from 4 April 1947 until 1954. During the 1930s, many events were promoted by sports promoter Tom Bradbury-Pratt.

The home team was known as the Harringay Canaries, then the Harringay Tigers, and finally the Harringay Racers Australian Vic Duggan was the top star from 1947 to 1950. When he retired Split Waterman took over as Racers star rider.

In 1950, with a gap to fill in their schedule, the promoters of the speedway staged an unofficial "Australian Championship" with the top Australian riders competing in Britain at the time.

The huge postwar popularity of speedway declined through the early 1950s and Harringay was one of many tracks that discontinued their involvement in the sport in that period.

The stadium was last used for speedway in 1961 when it hosted The F.I.M. Speedway Internationale on Jul 1st and the Provincial Riders' Championship on 16 September 1961.

== Stock car racing ==
BriSCA Formula 1 Stock Cars Racing was first held at Harringay stadium in 1954–55. After a break of five years, racing resumed in 1960 and continued off and on, until 1979.

The first BriSCA Formula 1 Stock Cars World Championship world final for stock cars took place at Harringay on 24 June 1955, won by Mac McDonnell. The World Final returned to Harringay in 1963, won by Doug Wardropper, in 1967, won by George Ansell, in 1970, won by Jim Esau and for the last time in 1973, won by Dave Chisholm.

In 1979 the stadium enjoyed a brief spell of fame of a different kind when a stock car event at the stadium was used as one of the locations for the film The Long Good Friday.

Banger racing (in which team tactics and more deliberate interception of opposing cars was permitted) also flourished at the stadium, featuring teams such as the North London Teddy Bears and the "Ahern Rats". The last Banger world final at Harringay took place in 1979.

== Other uses ==
There were a range of occasional events including the Hollywood Motor Rodeo in May 1955 and local school sports days from the early 1950s until 1964.

== Historical notes ==
Historical accounts paint a colourful picture of life around the stadium. Joe Coral, the founder of Coral Bookmakers, started his business at Harringay Stadium and other similar venues. Coral is supposed to have come up against organised crime boss Darby Sabini at Harringay but held his ground by holding a gun to Sabini's stomach.

Contemporary newspaper reports suggest that the crowds at the stadium could also be prone to violent disorder. There were at least three documented incidents of serious crowd disorder between 1938 and 1957. On 14 May 1938, when speedway racing was stopped early due to an accident, a crowd of 2,000 demanded their money back. When their demands were ignored the crowd broke onto the track, smashing and damaging parts of the stadium and setting fire to the track's tractor.

Eight years later a crowd attending a greyhound racing event ran riot after a second-placed dog was disqualified. According to The Guardian, the crowd

invaded the track and for over half an hour indulged in senseless destruction. They started bonfires which they fed with pieces of the hare trap...smashed electric lamps and arc lights, tore down telephone wires, and broke windows, wrecked the inside of the judge's box, overturned the starting trap...They also attacked the tote offices...

In June 1957 another disqualification provoked a further riot at a greyhound racing event. Similar levels of disorder as the previous riot were dealt with on this occasion by firemen from six fire appliances who turned their hoses on the crowd. Apparently the angry crowd was quickly dispersed, but they left quite a trail of destruction.

== Closure and demolition ==
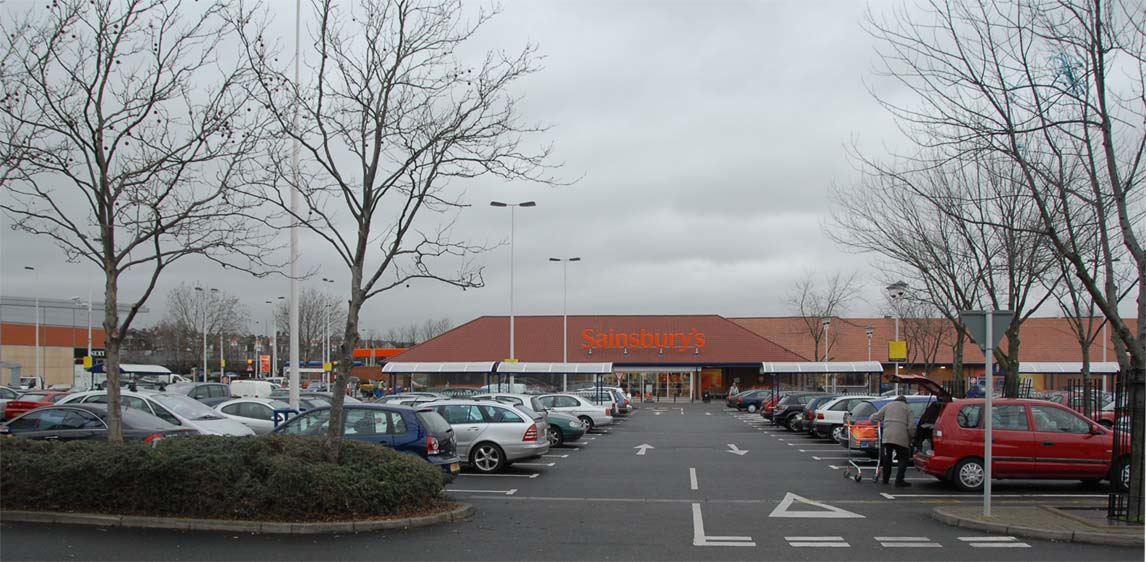
The Sainsbury's supermarket on the site of the stadium in 2008

The popularity of greyhound racing started to decline in the 1960s. Both this and some poor investment decisions by the GRA left the company almost £20 million in debt by 1975. In spite of this, the company was talking about major investment in Harringay as late as 1970. However, it had also been in talks with "a leading supermarket chain" about the sale of the land as early as 1967. In any event the stadium received little investment and as a result became quickly dilapidated.

In line with its property disinvestment strategy, the GRA sold the Harringay site in 1985 to Sainsbury's for £10.5 million. Two years later, on 27 September 1987, the stadium finally closed down. The site was cleared and in its place a Sainsbury's store and some new housing was built. The only remaining trace of the stadium is a very small area of open land to the south and east of the Sainsbury's car park, called Harringay Stadium Slopes.
