= Romford Greyhound Stadium =

Greyhound racing track in east London

Coordinates: 51°34′29″N 0°9′54″E

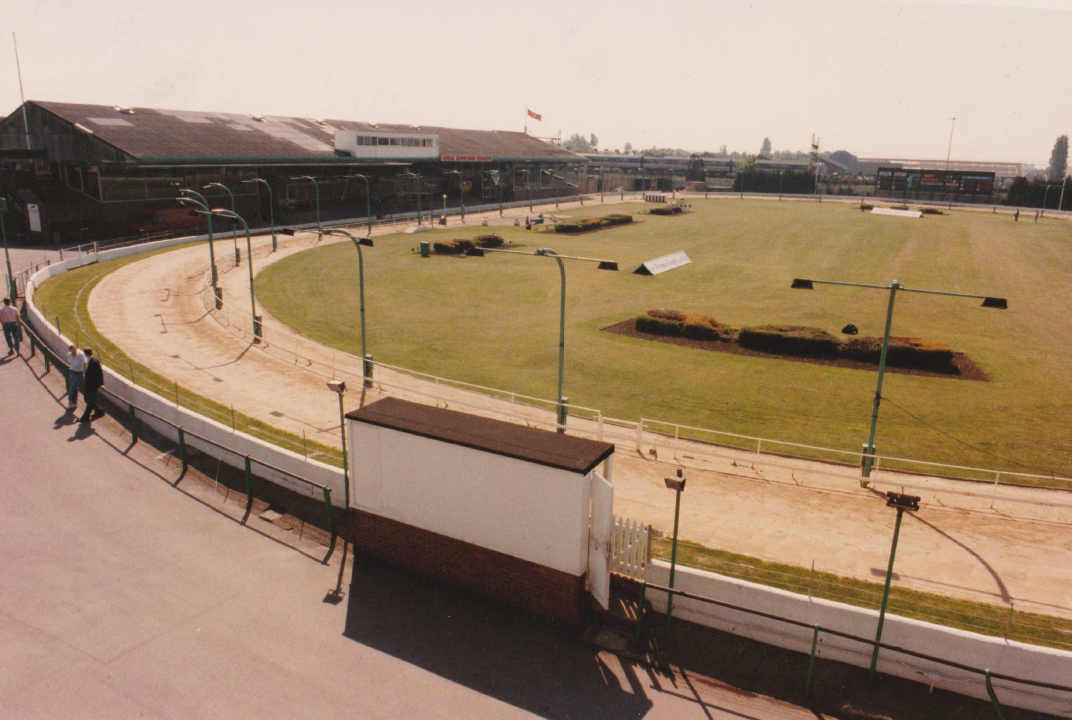
- Romford Greyhound Stadium circa.1980
- Interactive map of Romford Greyhound Stadium
- Location: London Road; Romford; Greater London; RM7 9DU; England
- Operator: Entain (Ladbrokes Coral)
- Capacity: 1,700 people

Construction
- Opened: Old track 1929; New track 1931
- Renovated: 2019

Tenant
- Greyhound racing

Website
- Official website

Romford Greyhound Stadium, referred to as Coral Romford Greyhound Stadium is a greyhound racing track located in Romford town centre in the London Borough of Havering in east London which is owned and operated by the Ladbrokes Coral group. The stadium has a capacity for over 1,700 people.

The stadium has won several awards including the British Greyhound Racing Board's 'Racecourse of the Year' award in 1998 and again in 2003. Following the closure of Crayford Stadium in January 2025, it is the only remaining greyhound racing stadium in London or the Greater London area.

== Racing ==
The track is 350 metres in circumference, and the distances raced are 225, 400, 575, 750 and 925 metres.

There are six race meetings each week, on Friday and Saturday evenings, Wednesday and Saturday mornings and two afternoon meetings on Monday and Thursday. During December racing is also held on Tuesday evenings.

Bets for each race can be placed either at the Tote or with the track-side bookmakers.

A number of major open racing events take place at the stadium each year, these include the Cesarewitch (an original classic), the Champion Stakes, the Essex Vase, Romford Puppy Cup, Golden Sprint and Coronation Cup.

== Facilities ==
The stadium consists of the Coral grandstand which is situated on the finishing line side of the track and is split over two levels. It contains two public bars, The Champions Bar and La Roc Bar, Trap 7 Snack Bar and Tote betting facilities. It also contains the Paddock Restaurant, which can seat 200 diners. The Coral grandstand opened on 6 September 2019 after a £10 million refurbishment.

A separate restaurant called The Pavilion is situated on the third bend and can cater for 100 diners. A purpose-built Marquee is situated on the fourth bend and contains a bar, snack bar and Tote betting facilities.

== Competitions ==
- Cesarewitch
- Essex Vase
- Champion Stakes
- Golden Sprint
- Romford Puppy Cup
- Coronation Cup

== History ==
=== Pre-war history and original track ===
Archer Leggett and his brother-in-law rented a small piece of land near the Crown Hotel just off the London Road in Romford in 1929. They put down £400 to equip the land ready for greyhound racing and opened for business on 21 June and invited privately owned greyhounds to chase a hare driven by an old Ford car engine. The venture only lasted one year because the landlord increased the rent, doubling it to £4 a week which resulted in the decision to move the greyhound operation. Later £600 was raised which enabled Leggett to build a new track with a stand in a field within Belle Vue Meadow adjacent to the London and North Eastern Railway line. The new site was on the south side of the London Road opposite the original venue north of the London Road. It included a hand-operated totalisator and electrically operated hare. The first meeting took place on 20 September 1931 with regular attendances in excess of 1,000 frequenting each meeting.

In 1935 four new directors including Fred Leaney and Michael Pohl joined the original directors and an extra £17,000 investment followed which allowed the track to turn to be converted into a stadium. Extra stands and kennels were constructed by the new company called Romford Stadium Ltd who then turned their attention to the recently purchased Dagenham Greyhound Stadium.

=== Cheetah racing ===
The greyhound industry boom allowed companies such as Romford Stadium Ltd to thrive and greyhound racing itself was big business and national news. Before work got underway at Dagenham, Arthur Leggett decided that he was going to bring cheetah racing to the UK. Twelve cheetahs arrived from Kenya in December 1936 courtesy of explorer Kenneth Gandar-Dower. After six months of quarantine the cheetahs were given time to acclimatise before Romford, Harringay and Staines were earmarked for the experiment with the cheetahs running for the first time on Saturday 11 December 1937 at Romford. The experiment failed, with just one further race held; the racing stopped because although the cheetahs were able to better the greyhound times they had to be let off first when racing greyhounds and when they raced against each other they lost interest and stopped chasing the lure.

With the new Dagenham opening in 1938 Leggett next introduced a new event to Romford in 1939 called the Essex Vase. The stadium consisted of the main grandstand on the home straight that featured the Seniors Club and on the back straight was another stand and the Junior Club within. The paddock was on the third bend with the racing kennels and the Racing Managers office. Between the first two bends sat the totalisator and general office, the press office was on the first bend and there was a very unusual Racing Managers box in the middle of the centre green. The track was 380 yards in circumference with distances of 460 & 650 yards and an 'Inside Sumner' hare. The resident kennels were situated in Heaton Grange, 24 acres of ground off Straight Road to the north-east of Romford.

=== Post-war history ===
The Essex Cup was discontinued after 1949 for fifteen years and the Racing Manager in the fifties was Les Cox. The Director of Racing Michael Pohl died in 1959, his son Michael J. Pohl Jr. was the assistant to Cox. Trainers attached to the track during this time were Peter Hawkesley, Bill Riley, Bob Thomson and Hubert Gray. George 'Bunny' Gough, former Racing Manager of Powderhall Stadium and Harringay Stadium, joined the track replacing Cox as Racing Manager in the early 1960s but the fallout from the 'Dagenham Coup' was felt by Romford Stadium Ltd in 1965 with the legal costs incurred by Romford Stadium Ltd finally being paid by the off-course bookmakers. It was the end for Dagenham as the company sold the track for £185,000 to a packaging business.

Training appointments towards the end of the decade and start of the 1970s included John Coleman and Terry Duggan and in 1975 a second feature event was added to the tracks portfolio when they introduced the Romford Puppy Cup. During 1976 Arthur Leggett, the managing director, on behalf of the company agreed the sale of Romford to Corals.

The new owners invested heavily into the track building a new grandstand which included a state of the art glass-fronted restaurant, the tote and hare system were also replaced. The investment reaped rewards as the track became extremely popular with public and the industry alike. John Sutton was brought in as the managing director, Gough was promoted to general manager and Des Nichols (who was RM in 1975–6 and again in 1978 with Sydney Wood in the interim) were racing managers. Corals signalled their intent by buying Brighton & Hove to double their track assets and preventing Ladbrokes from increasing their group, the latter had been a serious bidder for the two tracks at the same time.

In 1977 local greyhound 'Go Ahead Girl' recorded 17 consecutive wins for Duggan and one year later with Corals and Ladbrokes now owning seven tracks the payments for BAGS racing to the National Greyhound Racing Club ended. Instead the tracks would tender for the contracts. Only Hackney, Bristol and Watford along with five bookmaker-owned tracks (one of them being Romford) had BAGS contracts at this time.

Lauries Panther (owned by Laurie James and trained by Terry Duggan) won the 1982 English Greyhound Derby, providing Romford with their greatest moment and both Ballyregan Bob and Scurlogue Champ appeared at the track. The former won the 1985 Essex Vase going through unbeaten and breaking the track record in the final. Three new major events were introduced; the Coronation Cup became Romford's third major trophy in 1986 following the closure of Southend Stadium, the Golden Sprint was inaugurated in 1987 followed by the resurrected Champion Stakes in 1988. In 1996 former Bolton boss Peter O’Dowd became Racing Manager taking over from Steve Daniel who had himself only recently replaced Ray Spalding. Leading Trainers have included Linda Mullins, Peter Payne, Kenny Linzell, Linda Jones, David Mullins and Peter Rich.

=== 21st Century ===
In 2006 the stadium underwent a £400,000 refurbishment of the main grandstand restaurant. Trainer Paul Young (who joined the track in 2000) won the 2014 Trainers Championship. In 2018 the stadium signed a deal with SIS to race every Monday afternoon, Wednesday evening, Thursday afternoon, Friday evening and twice on a Saturday (morning and evening).

During 2019 a multimillion-pound renovation took place, which included the demolition of the main stand to create more car parking space, a modernisation of the reception area and office buildings, the construction a grand stand and a new track was laid down. The venue remained open throughout with the exception of four day closure in the August. The official re-opening was on 6 September 2019.

In 2020 the Cesarewitch competition was brought back after an eight-year dormant period, the event was sponsored by stadium owners Ladbrokes Coral as a category 1 race.

In 2022, Entain signed a long-term deal with the Arena Racing Company for media rights, starting in January 2024.

== Track records ==
=== Current ===
Metres	Greyhound	Time	Date	Notes
225	Chopchop Rainbow	13.17	28 October 2022	
400	Roxholme Nidge	23.26	15 September 2017	Romford Puppy Cup heats
575	New Destiny	34.53	14 June 2024	Coronation Cup final
750	Avit on Bertha	46.37	12 December 2012	
925	Riverside Honey	58.57	6 September 2019	TV Trophy heats
1100	Cregagh Prince	72.59	10 March 1987	
400 H	Glenwood Dream	24.07	12 March 2010	
575 H	El Tenor	35.53	19 February 1999	

=== Former (post-metric) ===
Extended content

Metres	Greyhound	Time	Date	Notes
225	Troy Tempest	13.42	13 September 2002	
225	Louisville	13.37	9 January 2004	
225	Rotar Wing	13.37	23 October 2009	
225	Tearaway John	13.28	12 March 2010	
225	Walk the Talk	13.18	9 June 2017	
400	Just Clear	24.21	10 August 1978	
400	Blue Style	24.02	1983	Romford Puppy Cup Final
400	Sados Choice	23.87	6 December 1986	
400	Right Move	23.78	8 May 1992	
400	Sandwichsunshine	23.58	27 September 1996	
400	Fifis Rocket	23.58	16 April 2010	Golden Sprint semi-final
400	Ardbeg Mentor	23.56	23 April 2010	Golden Sprint Final
400	Eden Star	23.34	16 September 2011	Romford Puppy Cup semi-final
575	Bermudas Fun	35.15	11 July 1978	Essex Vase Final
575	Ballyregan Bob	=35.15	9 July 1985	Essex Vase Final
575	Sard	35.09	21 September 1988	
575	Elderberry Chick	34.86	18 July 1997	Champion Stakes Final
575	Palace Issue	34.81	9 July 1999	
575	Sportsman	34.94	7 July 2003	Champion Stakes heats
575	Solid Money	34.78	9 July 2004	Champion Stakes second rd
575	Airport Captain	34.67	13 August 2013	Champion Stakes final
575	Adageo Bob	34.67	2 December 2014	
575	Quantum Leap	34.62	9 August 2019	
575	Sparta Master	34.59	22 November 2019	Essex Vase heats
575	Hollow Man	34.54	6 October 2023	Champion Stakes heats
715	Scurlogue Champ	44.18	16 April 1985	
750	Scurlogue Champ	46.80	2 March 1985	
750	Keem Rocket	46.70	2 March 1985	
750	Bubbly Prince	46.68	7 January 2000	
750	Killeacle Phoebe	46.64	19 June 2001	
925	Langford Dacoit	59.56	27 July 1978	
925	Salina	59.13	7 April 1981	
925	Aero Rebel	58.62	12 December 2012	
400 H	Barrymoss Queen	24.50	8 August 1985	
400 H	Emers Flight	24.49	18 September 1989	
400 H	Pantile	24.49	4 May 1990	
400 H	Run With Billy	24.41	18 February 1994	
400 H	Rossa Ranger	24.17	5 July 2002	
400 H	Sizzlers Bossman	24.15	18 July 2005	
400 H	Freedom Man	24.12	8 May 2009	
575 H	Champagne Glory	36.22	16 October 1984	
575 H	Shanavulin Jacko	36.20	10 April 1993	

=== Former (pre-metric) ===
Extended content

Yards	Greyhound	Time	Date	Notes
460	Beau Coup	26.54	27.08.1938	National Record
460	Tan Gent	26.08	1946	
460	Low Pressure	25.83	September 1959	
460	Yellow Dew	25.51	11 May 1963	
460	Westpark Jupiter	=25.51	1968	
460	Ace of Trumps	25.47	7 April 1969	
460	Houghton Spur	25.47	13 May 1969	=equalled
460	Ace of Trumps	25.18	13 May 1969	
500	Jimmy Pallet	27.69	11 May 1971	
550	Pastorale Passe-partout	32.58	1941	
650	Pearls Choice	37.66	1947	
650	Vals Parachute	36.43	7 August 1965	
650	Shamrock Clipper	36.42	1967	
650	Cullen Era	36.42	1968	=equalled
650	Tarrys Gay Lady	36.19	1970	
650	Dolores Rocket	36.06	6 July 1971	Essex Vase Final
840	Carmen Star	48.38	20 August 1963	
840	Breachs Blizzard	48.23	1967	
840	Hat Band	48.02	1970	
880	Bedford	50.35	1967	
880	The Marchioness	50.28	18 March 1972	
1030	Walking Champ	60.85	14 April 1964	
1030	Ashley Park Mystery	60.87	1967	
1030	Castle Satoo	60.42	1970	
1030	Curraheen Lady	60.00	11 May 1971	
460 H	Cheerful Chairman	27.60	9 May 1939	National Record
460 H	Vintners Cup	26.19	1958	
460 H	Derry Palm	26.14	2 June 1970	
650 H	Neds Bay	37.61	1967	
650 H	Gipsy Jerry	37.47	19 March 1968	
