= All England Cup =

Greyhound racing competition in England

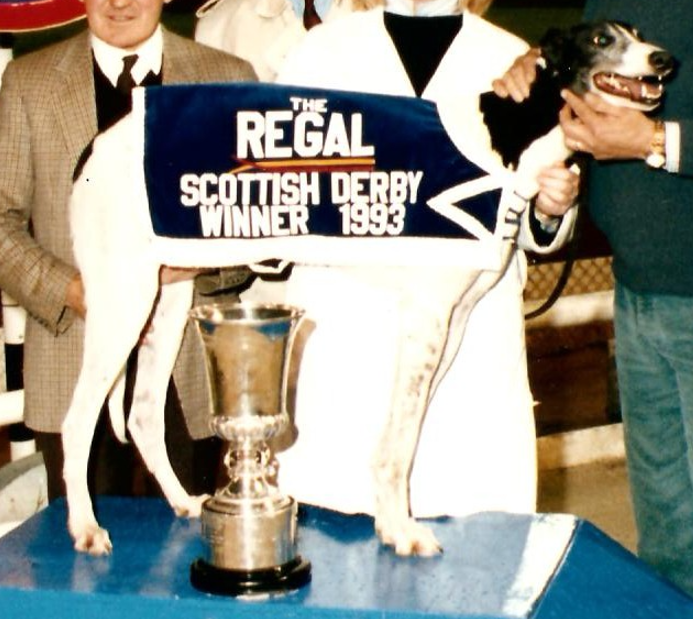
- 1992 winner, New Level
- Class: Category 1
- Location: Newcastle Stadium
- Inaugurated: 1938
- Sponsor: Premier Greyhound Racing

Race information
- Distance: 480 metres
- Surface: Sand
- Purse: £20,000 (winner)

The All England Cup is a greyhound racing competition held annually. It was inaugurated in 1938 at Brough Park later known as Newcastle and replaced the Northumberland Stakes as the primary event at the stadium.

History was made during the 1946 running when four of the entries were the four nations Derby winners. The English Greyhound Derby winner Mondays News, the Irish Greyhound Derby champion Lilac Lady, Welsh Greyhound Derby winner Negro's Lad and Scottish Greyhound Derby champion Lattin Pearl all competed. The hope that all four would progress to the final failed to materialise but two of them Monday's News and Lattin Pearl did make the final and duly finished first and second.

In 2022, the first prize was increased to £20,000 under the sponsorship of Premier Greyhound Racing.

== Venues and distances ==
- 1938–1953 (Brough Park/Newcastle 520 yards)
- 19??–present (Brough Park/Newcastle 480 metres)

== Sponsors ==
- 2005–2018 (William Hill)
- 2019–2019 (Alconex)
- 2020–2020 (Racing Post GTV)
- 2021–2021 (Arena Racing Company)
- 2022–2025 (Premier Greyhound Racing)

== Winners ==
Year	Winner	Breeding	Trainer	Time (sec)	SP	Notes/ref
1938	Ballyjoker	Beef Cutlet - Jeanne Of Waterhall	Sidney Orton (Wimbledon)	29.84	1/3f	
1939	Ballycurreen Soldier	Noras Cutlet - Sergeants Wife	Patrick McKinney (Carntyne)	29.94	66/1	
1946	Monday's News	Orlucks Best – Monday Next	Fred Farey (Private)	29.55	7/2	
1949	Intelligent Joe	Rare Rebel - Silver Midnight	Leslie Reynolds (Wembley)	29.58	9/4	
1950	Olivers Lad	Bellas Prince - Light Scent	Paddy Brennan (Shawfield)	29.60	7/1	
1951	Fancy Hero	Trabolgan Prince - Carriganea Lass	Jack Harvey (Wembley)	29.50	10/3	
1952	Endless Gossip	Priceless Border - Narrogar Ann	Leslie Reynolds (Wembley)	29.22	4/11f	Track record
1953	Leafy Ash	Mad Tanist - Ash Shaggy	Jim Syder Jr. (Wembley)	29.50	6/4f	
1954	Templenoe Rebel	Ballymac Ball - Templenoe Medora	D J Davis (Bristol)	29.65	5/1	
1956	Paracelsus	Quare Customer - Poobah's Pet	Noreen Collin (Private)	29.30	5/1	
1958	Simmer Down Pal	Olly's Pal - Ballygortagh Girl	Joe Booth (Private)	29.57	4/1	
1959	Just Fame	Colebreene Bell - More Fame	Tommy Johnston Sr. (Carntyne)	29.51	3/1	
1960	Quare Flash	Quare Customer - Newhill Primrose	Jim Hookway (Owlerton)	29.36	7/2	
1961	Amys Pal	Baytown Coak - Lovely Tara	Jack Brennan (Darnall)	29.68	8/1	
1962	West Bermuda	Prince Of Bermuda - Orelino	Jim Hookway (Owlerton)	29.54	6/1	
1963	Atomic Rake	Man Of Pleasure - Atomic Smart	Randy Singleton (Belle Vue)	29.37	20/1	
1964	Total Barber	Brook Prancer - Belville Lass	Alf Prentice (Monmore)	29.23	20/1	
1965	Booked Out	Knock Hill Chieftain - Direct Lead	Eric Adkins (Private)	29.25	4/6f	
1966	Kilbeg Kuda	Knockrour Again - Bermudas Glory	John Bassett (Private)	29.40	5-1	
1967	Home Grown	The Grand Canal - Wild Countess	Ted Brennan (Owlerton)	29.75	4/1	
1968	Pools Punter	Oregon Prince - Wild Countess	Ted Brennan (Owlerton)	30.57	20/1	
1969	Jackpot Painter	Red Factor - Stuake Rose	Bryce Wilson (Private)	30.54	5/1	
1970	Allied Banker	Greenane Flash - Glenogue	Bryce Wilson (Private)	30.64	3/1	
1971	Spectre Jockey	Spectre - Jockeys Dream	David Power (Private)	30.54	4/5f	
1972	Proud Tack	Newdown Heather - Annaglaive Queen	Gordon Hodson (White City - London)	30.20	5/2	
1973	Fly Dazzler	Kilbeg Kuda - Nualas Lovely	Norman Oliver (Brough Park)	30.63	7/2	
1975	Show Man	Monalee Champion - Crefogue Dancer	Bill Raggatt (Brough Park)	29.21	4/5f	
1976	Houghton Rip	Spectre - Call Me Swallow	Barbara Tompkins (Bletchley)	29.93	2/1f	
1977	Prince Hill	Own Pride - Dainty Beauty	Joe Kelly (Leeds)	29.37	1/1f	
1978	Champers Club	Patricias Hope - Ballypierce Girl	Paddy Milligan (Private)	29.30	5/4f	
1979	Burniston Jet	Jimsun - Davids Black	Jim Hookway (Sheffield)	29.45	5/1	
1980	Jon Barrie	Clashing - Famous Heart	Ray Andrews (Leeds)	30.37	5/2	
1982	Long Spell	Downing - Moss Drain	Joe Booth (Private)	30.92	4/6f	
1983	Squire Cass	Yellow Ese - Minus	Terry Dartnall (Reading)	30.15	11/4	
1985	Moneypoint Coal	Yellow Band - Queens Hotel	Seamus Graham (Ireland)	30.08	5/4f	
1986	Lavally Oak	I'm Slippy - Lavally Time	Jane Glass (Powderhall)	30.39	8/11f	
1987	Killouragh Chris	Moreen Rocket - Moreen Honey	Pete Beaumont (Sheffield)	30.57	4/5f	
1988	Pond Hurricane	Lindas Champion - Soda Pop II	Harry Williams (Brough Park)	30.56	6/4f	
1989	Slippy Blue	I'm Slippy - Valoris	Kenny Linzell (Walthamstow)	30.39	11/4	
1990	Alans Luck	I'm Slippy - Lindas Pleasure	Ray Andrews (Belle Vue)	31.02	4/1	
1991	Monaree Tommy	Ninth Wave - Maglass Model	John Copplestone (Portsmouth)	30.75	3/1	
1992	New Level	Murlens Slippy - Well Plucked	Harry Williams (Private)	28.73	8/11f	
1993	Toms Lodge	Druids Lodge - Grannys Black	Norman Johnson (Norton Canes)	29.20	6/4f	
1994	Moral Director	Double Bid - Moral Shadow	Jimmy Gibson (Belle Vue)	28.97	4/1	
1995	Just Right Jumbo	I'm Slippy - Chini Chin Chin	George Miller (Sunderland)	27.94	12/1	
1996	Greenwell Eagle	Manx Treasure - Cahills Gate	Patrick Flaherty Shawfield	28.97	5/1	
1997	Endon Tiger	Slaneyside Hare - Kevalnig Kwik	Charlie Lister (Peterborough)	29.10	4/6f	
1998	Stephens Hero	Next Move (UK) - Pennys Sweetness	Ted Soppitt (Private)	29.16	6/1	
1999	Derbay Flyer	Ayr Flyer - Brown Missile	Charlie Lister (Private)	28.97	4/6f	
2000	Toblermorey Boy	Spiral Nikita - Lemon Polly	Charlie Lister (Private)	28.68	1/2f	
2001	Barney The Bold	Iceni Regent - Cashel Walk Janis	Carmichael (Private)	28.63	2/1f	=Track record
2002	Let It Slip	Spiral Nikita - Always Dancing	David Mullins (Romford)	28.57	10/1	
2003	Full Cigar	Frisby Full - Have A Cigar	Liz McNair (Private)	28.67	5/2	
2004	Tally Ho Shimmer	Fast Fit Stag-Tally Ho Flyer	Jimmy Little (Private)	28.57	1/1f	
2005	Bell Devotion	Kiowa Shawnee So - Droopys Kristin	Charlie Lister (Private)	28.29	5/2	
2006	Geordie Parker	Brett Lee - Lydpal Louise	Charlie Lister (Private)	28.83	1/1f	
2007	Wright Signal	Hondo Black - Farloe Signal	Elaine Parker (Sheffield)	28.62	9/4	
2008	Boherna Best	Pacific Mile - Always On Air	Barrie Draper (Sheffield)	28.32	4/7f	
2009	Boherna Best	Pacific Mile - Always On Air	Barrie Draper (Sheffield)	28.86	2/1f	
2010	Mill Pinpoint	Hallucinate-Saleen Chloe	Kelly Macari (Sunderland)	28.35	5/2	
2011	Mill Bling Bling	Bombastic Shiraz – Respect For Lee	Kelly Macari (Sunderland)	28.88	7/4f	
2012	Mags Gamble	Crash – Movealong Rose	Harry Williams (Newcastle)	28.20	6/4	
2013	Calzaghe Davy	Crash – Our Favourite	Ted Soppitt (Private)	28.28	5/2	
2014	Newinn Yolo	Crash – Little Flutter	Pat Rosney (Perry Barr)	28.44	4/1	
2015	Farloe Nutter	Hondo Black - Wontbelong	George Power (Private)	28.61	6/1	
2016	Oscar Whisky	Droopys Oscar – Droopys Danneel	Charlie Lister OBE (Private)	28.26	5/4f	
2017	Droopys Expert	Greenwell Hawk – Droopys Rhiona	Angela Harrison (Newcastle)	28.10	6/4f	
2018	Droopys Verve	Loughteen Blanco – Droopys Cyclone	Angela Harrison (Newcastle)	28.24	1/2f	
2019	Ice on Fire	Crash – Bigmans Grainne	James Fenwick (Newcastle)	28.16	4/5f	
2020	Bower Luke	Droopys Sydney – Droopys Blossom	Pat Rosney (Belle Vue)	28.23	11/2	
2021	Moanteen Mikey	Droopys Buick – Moanteen Golden	Angela Harrison (Newcastle)	28.72	11/4f	
2022	Mickys Barrett	Out Of Range ASB – The Other Tessa	Jason Gray (Nottingham)	28.55	7/4	
2023	Swift Silly	Pestana – Swift Magnetic	Raymond Hale (Newcastle)	28.48	13/8f	
2024	Wicky Ned	Droopys Sydney – Ballycowen Lucy	James Fenwick (Newcastle)	28.05	4/9f	
2025	Santas Amigo	Ballymac Best – Santas Jet	David Mullins (Romford)	28.34	8/13f	

== Winning trainers ==
- Charlie Lister 6
- Angela Harrison 3
- Harry Williams 3
- Jim Hookway 3
