= Stewards' Cup (greyhounds) =

- Location: Walthamstow
- Inaugurated: 1941
- Final run: 2008

Race information
- Distance: 640 metres
- Surface: Sand

The Stewards' Cup was a greyhound competition held annually.

It was inaugurated in 1941 and a different venue was chosen each year by the National Greyhound Racing Club over the standard distance of the relevant track (and much later the stayers distance).

From 1981 until 1987 the competition was held at Brighton and was for British Bred greyhounds only. The following year the competition found a permanent home at Walthamstow Stadium.

The event ended in 2008 following the closure of Walthamstow.

== Past winners ==
Year	Winner	Breeding	Trainer	Time	SP	Venue & Distance	Notes
1941	Lairds Cutlet	Beef Cutlet – War Spy	Archie Whitcher (Clapton)	30.30	4-1	Walthamstow	
1942	Ballynennan Moon	Mr Moon – Banriogan Dann	Sidney Orton (Wimbledon)	29.92	1-3f	Walthamstow	
1943	Blackwater Cutlet	Woodrow – Editors Belle	Paddy Fortune (Wimbledon)	30.26	11-10f		dead-heat
1943	Ballykildare		Sidney Orton (Wimbledon)	30.26	5-2		dead-heat
1944	Ballyhennessy Seal	Lone Seal – Canadian Glory	Stan Martin (Wimbledon)	30.10	4-9f		
1948	Honey Boy Finnegan		Johnny Bullock (West Ham)	29.98	2-1	Wembley	
1949	Eastern Madness	Mad Tanist – East of the River	Leslie Reynolds (Wembley)	28.60	2-1jf		
1950	Ballyedmond Fergus		Leslie Reynolds (Wembley)	31.65	100-30		
1951	Rushton Smutty	Mad Tanist – Summer Frock	Frank Johnson (Private)	29.42	7-4	White City	
1952	Mellow Mystery	Ballyguiltenane Tom - Magic Mystery	Bert Heyes (White City - London)	29.50	6-1	Shawfield	
1953	Magourna Reject	Astras Son – Saucy Dame	Tom Paddy Reilly (Walthamstow)	28.63	3-1	Gloucester	
1954	Coolkill Chieftain	Celtic Chief - Coolkill Darkie	Jack Harvey (Wembley)	33.44	1-1f	West Ham	
1955	Gulf Of Darien	Imperial Dancer – Dorothy Ann	Jack Harvey (Wembley)	40.21	7-4jf	Brough Park	
1956	Silver Chief	The Grand Champion – Never Falter	Joe Booth (Private)	28.22	4-1	Hall Green	
1957	Silent Worship	The Grand Champion-Miss Chancer	John Bassett (Wolverhampton)	29.43	9-4jf	Wembley	
1958	Budget Surplus	Magourna Reject - Coolflash	Wilf France (Harringay)	40.46	6-1	Leeds	
1959	Greenane Airways	Imperial Airways – Take Astra	Jim Irving (Private)	51.75	1-4f	Powderhall	
1960	Noonans Rhapsody	Ballymac Ball – Vahsel Bay	Jimmy Jowett (Clapton)	34.84	7-2	New Cross	
1961	In Town Tonight	Greenane Airways – Top and Left	Jim Irving (Private)	29.22		White City	
1962	Greenane Toast	Solar Prince – Burnt Toast	Bessie Lewis (Private)	30.58		White City Glasgow	
1963	Cahara Rover	Paddle First – Cahara Lass	Joe De Mulder (Private)	27.73		Wimbledon	
1964	Cranog Bet	Knock Hill Chieftain – Don't Bet	Phil Rees Sr. (Private)	28.83		Brough Park	Track record
1965	Clonmannon Flash	Prairie Flash – Dainty Sister	Jim Hookway (Owlerton)	29.77		Shawfield	
1966	Lazy Tim	Clonalvy Pride – You Little Daisy	Frank Baldwin (Perry Barr)	30.58		White City	
1967	Forward King	Crazy Parachute – Supreme Witch	Ted Brennan (Owlerton)	39.82		Monmore	Track record
1968	Quiet Cheer	Golden Cheers – Vals Pet	Joe Booth (Private)	28.44		Middlesbrough	
1969	Cals Pick	Any Harm – Flying Sherry	Jack Harvey (Wembley)	29.88	4-5f	Wembley	
1970	Peace Blue Boy	Tric Trac – Peace Rose	Stan Mitchell (Belle Vue)	40.55	7-1	Powderhall	
1972	Ramdeen Stuart	Sallys Story – Any Streak	Norman Oliver (Brough Park)	40.19	1-2f		
1975	Dunworkin	Yanka Boy - Reflection	Brian Jay (Perry Barr)	46.39		Perry Barr	
1977	Boherglass Swell	Kilbelin Style – Walterstown Miss	Geoff De Mulder (Hall Green)	28.91	11-10f	Walthamstow	
1978	Snowhill King	Bright Lad – Clorinka Clover	Dave Drinkwater (Bletchley)	41.63		Crayford	
1981	Status Quo		George Curtis (Brighton)	42.14	1-2f	Brighton 695m	
1982	The Italian Job	Cosmic Orbit – Stylish Dolores	Gunner Smith (Brighton)	41.61	6-4	Brighton 695m	
1983	Decoy Lassie	Westown Adam – Tibbys Girl	Joe Cobbold (Cambridge)	41.89		Brighton 695m	
1984	Keem Rocket	Decoy Sovereign – Keem Princess	Tony Meek (Swindon)	41.40		Brighton 695m	
1985	Mines Kango			41.74		Brighton 695m	
1986	Black Superman	Yankee Express – Grassmere Lass		41.87		Brighton 695m	
1987	Olivers Wish	Whisper Wishes – Westmead Tania	Nick Savva (Private)	41.35		Brighton 695m	
1988	Westmead Move	Whisper Wishes – Westmead Tania	Nick Savva (Private)			Walthamstow 640m	
1989	Chicita Banana	Sail On II – Bonita Banana	John McGee Sr. (Canterbury)			Walthamstow 640 m	
1990	Chicita Banana	Sail On II – Bonita Banana	John McGee Sr. (Hackney)	39.42	5-4f	Walthamstow 640 m	
1991	Rahan Arc	Whisper Wishes – Lemon Gem	Dick Hawkes (Walthamstow)	39.77	4-5f	Walthamstow 640 m	
1992	Lets All Boogie	Carters Lad – Princess Alucard	John Coleman (Walthamstow)	39.69	1-2f	Walthamstow 640 m	
1993	Squire Delta	Easy and Slow – Squire Jenny	John Coleman (Walthamstow)	40.00	5-2	Walthamstow 640 m	
1994	Ballygown Lilly	Track Man – Babary Doll	Danny Talbot (Private)	39.69	11-4	Walthamstow 640 m	
1995	Suncrest Sail	Low Sail - Sarahs Surprise	Charlie Lister (Private)	39.59	11-10f	Walthamstow 640 m	
1996	Treasured Manx	Manx Treasure - Yagoodthing	Shaun Neary (Private)	40.04	1-1f	Walthamstow 640 m	
1997	Carloway Jill	Frightful Flash – Prize Dancer	Geoff De Mulder (Private)	39.92	3-1	Walthamstow 640 m	
1998	Cushie Amazing	Lyons Dean – Cushie Wini	Martin Burt (Monmore)	39.79	9-2	Walthamstow 640 m	
1999	Malbay Flash	Phantom Flash – Back the Glen	Ernie Gaskin Sr. (Walthamstow)	40.39	7-1	Walthamstow 640 m	
2000	El Poker	Come On Ranger – Good Customer	Linda Mullins (Walthamstow)	40.39	2-1	Walthamstow 640 m	
2001	Smoking Baby	Top Honcho – Security Special	Derek Knight (Hove)	40.14	11-4	Walthamstow 640 m	
2002	Hollinwood Buck	Night Trooper – Hollinwood Major	Mick Clarke (Stainforth)	40.58	10-1	Walthamstow 640 m	
2003	Droopys Puma	Kiowa Shawnee So – Droopys Kristin	Gary Baggs (Walthamstow)	39.84	8-1	Walthamstow 640 m	
2004	Hallam Heskey	Droopys Zidane – Droopys Kate	Gary Baggs (Walthamstow)	40.12	7-2	Walthamstow 640 m	
2005	Droopys Puma	Kiowa Shawnee So – Droopys Kristin	Gary Baggs (Walthamstow)	39.84	8-1	Walthamstow 640 m	
2006	Romford Car Two	Premier County – Rosden Panda	John Mullins (Walthamstow)	39.76	3-1	Walthamstow 640 m	
2007	Mitzie	Just the Best – Minnies Sparkler	Mick Puzey (Walthamstow)	40.02	7-1	Walthamstow 640 m	
2008	Aero Blackjack	Blackjack Tom – Great Madam	Mark Wallis (Walthamstow)	39.38	4-1	Walthamstow 640 m	
