= 1962 Irish Greyhound Derby =

Irish dog race

- Venue: Shelbourne Park
- Location: Dublin
- End date: 11 August
- Total prize money: £1,250 (winner)

The 1962 Irish Greyhound Derby took place during July and August with the final being held at Shelbourne Park in Dublin on 11 August 1962.

The winner Shane's Legacy won £1,250 and was trained, owned and bred by Bob McCann.

== Final result ==
At Shelbourne, 11 August (over 525 yards):

Position	Name of Greyhound	Breeding	Trap	SP	Time	Trainer
1st	Shane's Legacy	Knock Hill Chieftain - Betsy	5	5-1	29.58	Bob McCann
2nd	Golden Cheers	The Grand Fire - Atomic Smart	6	8-1	29.70	Mrs Remy Eastwood
3rd	Dark Baby	Knockrour Again - Ronnoc Miss	2	3-1	29.73	Dave Cashman
4th	Black July	Cheeky Tippy - Maddest Lily	4	5-4f	29.85	Harry O'Neill
5th	Peculiar	unknown	1	10-1		Bill Kirwan
6th	Spider Hill	Forever Cloone - She Can Can	3	20-1		Jim Syder Jr.

=== Distances ===
1½, neck, 1½ (lengths)

== Competition Report ==
The Grand Canal was the nation's favourite greyhound following his success in the 1962 English Greyhound Derby and lifting the Easter Cup crown but he did not enter for the 1962 Irish Derby leaving the event wide open. Ireland's leading trainer Gay McKenna had failed to win the premier event but it was considered as a foregone conclusion that he eventually would. It started well for him when he sent out the fastest heat winner in Brookeville Sputnik (29.30) and other impressive heat winners included Steady the Man (29.46), Dark Baby (29.47) and Shanes Legacy (29.67).

In the second round the fastest second round winner was the Belfast owned Kashmir Lad who recorded 29.30. Black July and Alpine Mac both scored wins and Steady the Man and Peculiar remained unbeaten. By the time the semi-finals arrived Black July (trained by Harry O’Neill) defeated Shanes Legacy in 29.40, Black July had performed poorly in the English Greyhound Derby but had made the Welsh Greyhound Derby final. The second semi-final went to Dark Baby from English challenger Spider Hill; the latter was trained by Jim Syder and had made the 1961 English Greyhound Derby final with Joe Pickering. The third and final semi saw Golden Cheers defeat Peculiar.

Black July was hot favourite for the final which was decided at the first bend when Dark Baby slipped around the bend pursued by Shanes Legacy, Spider Hill with Black July finding significant trouble and Spider Hill knocked over and losing his jacket. Shanes Legacy caught Dark Baby to take victory with Golden Cheers finishing very well to take second place.

Shanes Legacy was sold immediately after the presentation by his owner Bob McCann for £2,500 to a London building contractor named Bob Gough who then put the greyhound in England with Tony Dennis. Later in the year Dark Baby went on to win the Laurels at Cork and break the track record. The title of Derby champion still eluded Gay McKenna.

== See also ==
- 1962 UK & Ireland Greyhound Racing Year
