= 1976 UK & Ireland Greyhound Racing Year =

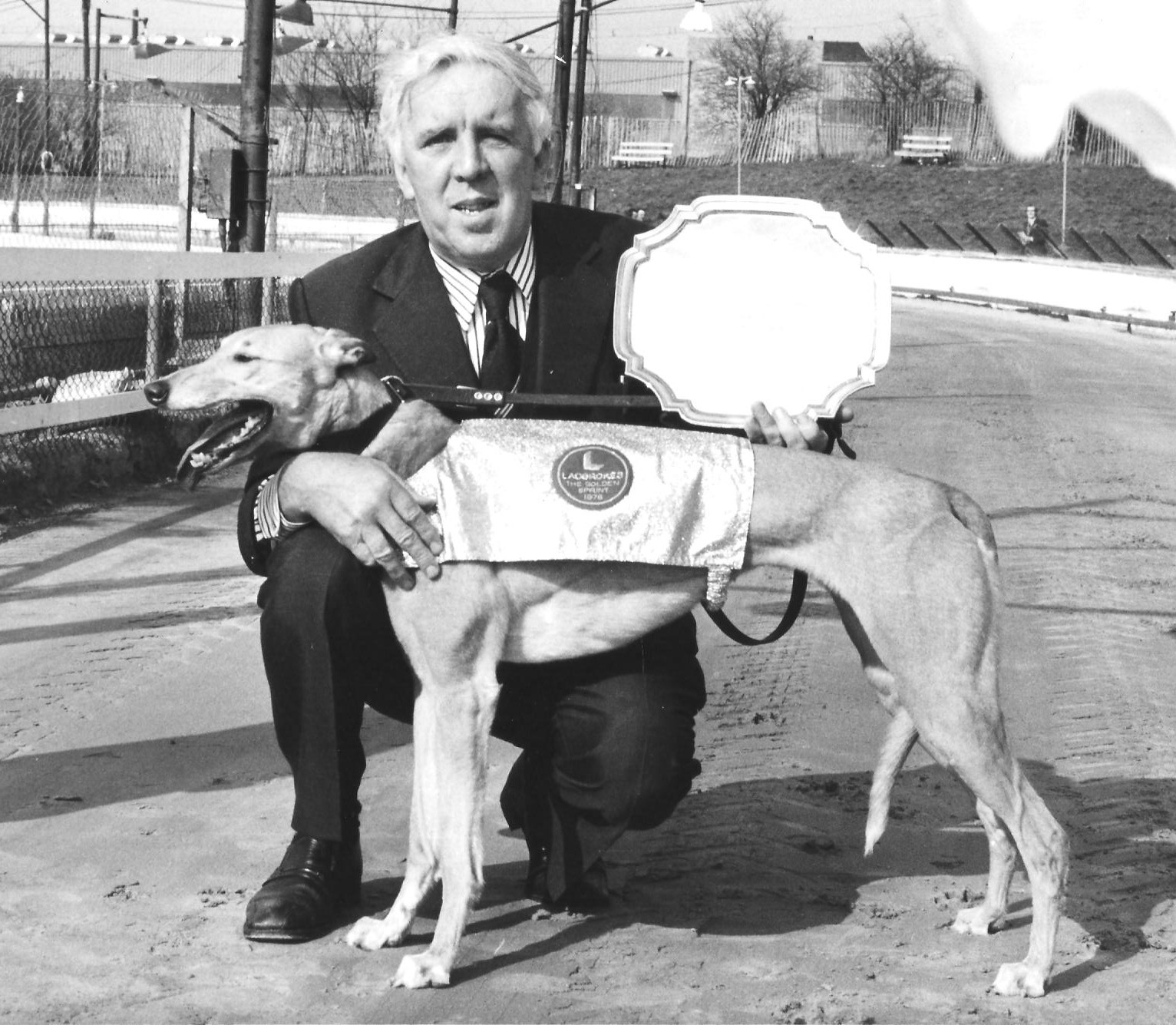
- Barney O'Connor with Oaks champion Ballinderry Moth

The 1976 UK & Ireland Greyhound Racing Year was the 51st year of greyhound racing in the United Kingdom and the 50th year of greyhound racing in Ireland.

== Roll of honour ==
Major Winners
Award	Name of Winner
1976 English Greyhound Derby	Mutts Silver
1976 Irish Greyhound Derby	Tain Mor
1976 Scottish Greyhound Derby	Flip Your Top
1976 Welsh Greyhound Derby	Cameo Colonel
Greyhound Trainer of the Year	Phil Rees Sr.
Greyhound of the Year	Mutts Silver & Westmead Champ
Irish Greyhound of the Year	Tain Mor

== Summary ==
The National Greyhound Racing Club (NGRC) released the annual returns, with totalisator turnover down, at £66,657,176 and attendances up, recorded at 6,517,864 from 5923 meetings. The sport remained the UK's second most popular spectator sport behind football and Ireland's most popular sporting pastime.

Peruvian Style equalled Westpark Mustard's world record. Mutts Silver, a fawn dog trained by Phil Rees Sr. and Westmead Champ, another fawn dog trained by Pam Heasman were voted joint winners of the Greyhound of the Year. Mutts Silver won the premier event the 1976 English Greyhound Derby and Westmead Champ won the Gold Collar at Catford Stadium, the St Leger at Wembley Greyhounds and the Regency. A new system of selecting the greyhound of the year was inaugurated; it involved thirteen members of the greyhound press voting for one greyhound each. Mutts Silver and Westmead Champ ended with six votes each and were declared joint winners.

The Greyhound Racing Association (GRA) Property Trust relied on a scheme of arrangement that was organised to stop the once great greyhound company from going into liquidation, they owed £15 million to creditors. The remaining GRA greyhound racing tracks were left to pay the creditors by virtue of payments from their operating profit.

== Tracks ==
Two bookmaking giants Corals and Ladbrokes came directly into greyhound racing, Corals purchased Romford from Romford Stadium Ltd, headed by Managing Director Archer Leggett, the same man that had started the track in 1929. They invested heavily with a new grandstand, restaurant and track facilities. John Sutton became the new Managing Director and Sidney Wood became the new Racing Manager. Coral also bought Brighton, which received new investment and the track would go on to beat Shawfield Stadium in the final of the National Intertrack. Ladbrokes had been beaten to the purchase of the two tracks by Corals denying Ladbrokes the opportunity to own eight tracks in total because they had just purchased Totalisators and Greyhound Holdings (TGH) on 6 February. TGH owned six stadia at Brough Park, Crayford & Bexleyheath, Leeds, Gosforth, Willenhall and Monmore. However they were successful in acquiring a seventh track in July, when they purchased Perry Barr. Arthur Aldridge, formerly of the Greyhound Racing Association, joined Ladbroke as Racing Director.

Former Oaks winning trainer Mick Hawkins bought Ramsgate, under the name Northern Sports (parent company Hawkins of Harrow) from Dumpton (Thanet) Greyhounds Ltd for £185,000. His son David Hawkins was the Managing Director of Northern Sports who also owned the independent Doncaster Greyhound Track.

The unsold Oxford Stadium was renamed Cowley Stadium under a caretakers Don Joyce and Peter Jones and Maidstone opened following an agreement with Horace Luper and the Maidstone United Football Club. Salford closed on 30 July.

== News ==
Charles Chandler Sr. (the Walthamstow Stadium Chairman) died. Wimbledon Stadium introduced sectional timing and was one of the first tracks to use the system of grading in classes. A Romford bitch called Go Ahead Girl recorded 17 consecutive wins.

Prominent sire Newdown Heather died at Jack Mullan's kennels aged 12. His progeny included Dolores Rocket, Westpark Mustard and Time Up Please.

== Competitions ==
A white and blue dog called Xmas Holiday won both the Laurels at Wimbledon and the Scurry Gold Cup at Slough Stadium.

== Ireland ==
American tracks were increasing in number and with the 22 Irish tracks in operation the demand in breeding increased. Irish bred greyhounds increased in value as a consequence. Peruvian Style returned after his winter rest in a quest to beat Westpark Mustard's world record. After winning the Callanan Cup at Harold's Cross Stadiums the sequence stood at 16 consecutive wins. Two runs and wins with a track record in 29.28 seconds, during the Truboard Gold Cup at Waterford extended the run to 18 just one short of Mick the Miller and two less than Westpark Mustard. However an injury sustained in the final would leave him side-lined for six months. Peruvian Style returned to action in October with the defence of his Waterford Glass Stakes title. In the first round he won but pulled up lame after the race resulting in a one-month break. He was then entered at his home track Galway for the Federation Championship. A heat win enabled him to overtake Mick the Miller and equal Westpark Mustard's world record. A record attendance watched the final and witnessed an incredible shock when a greyhound called Pet Ace defeated Peruvian Style and the world record was not surpassed. He was immediately retired and put to stud duties. A greyhound called Tain Mor was voted Irish Greyhound of the Year despite the exploits of Peruvian Style

== Principal UK races ==
BBC TV Trophy, Belle Vue (Mar 24, 815m, £1,500)
Pos	Name of Greyhound	Trainer	SP	Time	Trap
1st	Aughadonagh Jock	Brian Jay	52.77	12-1	3
2nd	Dunworkin		52.93	3-1	6
3rd	Go Ahead Girl		53.11	7-2	5
4th	Doverdale Lady	Rita Wood	53.43	8-1	4
5th	Young Hostess		53.55	10-1	1
6th	Butchers Trac		53.85	2-1f	2

Grand National, White City (April 10 500m h, £1,500)
Pos	Name of Greyhound	Trainer	SP	Time	Trap
1st	Weston Pete	Colin West	4-5f	30.60	3
2nd	Fawn Hunter		40-1	30.66	2
3rd	Ashgrove Road	Paddy McEvoy	7-1	30.76	4
4th	Tawny Black	David Kinchett	10-1	30.86	6
5th	Rokeel Striker	Adam Jackson	6-1	31.10	5
6th	Crefogue Special		100-30	31.22	1

Scurry Gold Cup, Slough (April 17, 434m, £2,000)
Pos	Name of Greyhound	Trainer	SP	Time	Trap
1st	Xmas Holiday	Phil Rees Sr.	11-10f	26.67	1
2nd	Mutts Silver	Phil Rees Sr.	11-2	26.95	2
3rd	Solid Sid	John Cox	14-1	27.09	5
4th	Raheen Sam	John Coleman	6-4	27.25	6
5th	Bold Tycoon		33-1	27.26	4
6th	Black Gent	Joe Farrand	40-1	27.71	3

Laurels, Wimbledon (May 21, 460m, £3,000)
Pos	Name of Greyhound	Trainer	SP	Time	Trap
1st	Xmas Holiday	Phil Rees Sr.	3-1	27.66	3
2nd	Sean Na Gaisce	John Coleman	9-4f	27.76	6
3rd	Reddans Walk	George Curtis	4-1	27.84	4
4th	Black Barbarian	Paddy McEvoy	5-1	27.90	5
5th	Vive Argente		25-1	28.02	1
6th	Knockanure Champ	Barney O'Connor	7-1	28.18	2

Welsh Derby, Arms Park (Jul 10, 500m £1,200)
Pos	Name of Greyhound	Trainer	SP	Time	Trap
1st	Cameo Colonel	John Gibbons	10-1	29.63	3
2nd	Ballybeg Punter		6-1	29.69	5
3rd	Cu An Oir	Ralph Smith	5-1	30.03	4
4th	Houghton Rip	Barbara Tompkins	5-4f	30.07	2
5th	Reddans Walk	George Curtis	2-1	30.13	1
N/R	Ardbeg Express	Andy Agnew			

Ladbrokes Cesarewitch, Belle Vue (July 17, 815m, £2,000)
Pos	Name of Greyhound	Trainer	SP	Time	Trap
1st	Moy Summer	Harry Bamford	16-1	51.32	5
2nd	The Sheik		14-1	51.58	6
3rd	Bonzo	George Curtis	4-6f	51.66	1
4th	Nurses Son	John Coleman	7-1	51.68	4
5th	Anglo Highjinks		6-1	51.82	2
6th	Bedas Flame	Jim Singleton	7-2	51.04	3

Scottish Greyhound Derby, Shawfield (Aug 7, 505m, £2,000)
Pos	Name of Greyhound	Trainer	SP	Time	Trap
1st	Flip Your Top	Bob Young	11-10f	30.56	2
2nd	Westmead Myra	Natalie Savva	2-1	30.80	4
3rd	Merry Forever	Pat Casey	8-1	30.92	3
4th	Doon Fantasy	Terry Dartnall	6-1	30.95	1
5th	Dromlara Master	Bertie Gaynor	10-1		5
N/R	Drynham Star	Natalie Savva			

Gold Collar, Catford (Sep 25, 555m, £2,000)
Pos	Name of Greyhound	Trainer	SP	Time	Trap
1st	Westmead Champ	Pam Heasman	4-7f	35.02	2
2nd	Mutts Silver	Phil Rees Sr.	2-1	35.32	4
3rd	Faypoint Flyer		33-1	35.42	1
4th	Angel Eyes	Ted Parker	10-1	35.82	6
5th	Findon Venture	Arthur Boyce	33-1	35.84	5
6th	Isle of Thanet	Jim Barry	40-1	36.24	3

St Leger, Wembley (Sep 6, 655m, £5,000)
Pos	Name of Greyhound	Trainer	SP	Time	Trap
1st	Westmead Champ	Pam Heasman	9-4	39.90	2
2nd	Drynham Star	Natalie Savva	4-1	39.94	5
3rd	Bangor Boon	Paddy Coughlan	6-1	39.96	1
4th	Moy Summer	Harry Bamford	33-1	40.22	6
5th	Flip Your Top	Bob Young	11-2	40.46	4
6th	Picture Parade	Geoff De Mulder	7-4f	40.54	3

The Grand Prix, Walthamstow (Oct 23, 640m, £2,500)
Pos	Name of Greyhound	Trainer	SP	Time	Trap
1st	Manderlay King	Geoff De Mulder	9-2	40.21	4
2nd	Picture Parade	Geoff De Mulder	1-1f	40.29	3
3rd	Lady Denellen	Pam Heasman	25-1	40.49	6
4th	Sail Out Era	P.Hawke	11-2	40.69	5
5th	Miss Mott		33-1	40.85	2
6th	Bonzo	Mrs Berry Bateman	3-1	00.00	1

Oaks, Harringay (Nov 5, 475m, £1,750)
Pos	Name of Greyhound	Trainer	SP	Time	Trap
1st	Ballinderry Moth	Barney O'Connor	4-6f	28.60	2
2nd	Paradise Peg	Ted Griffin	6-1	28.82	3
3rd	Ka Boom	Natalie Savva	12-1	29.06	5
4th	Isle of Thanet	Jim Barry	20-1	29.14	1
5th	Ballybeg Seven	Sid Ryall	33-1	29.22	6
6th	Lucky Arrival	Hugh McEntyre	7-2	29.28	4

== Totalisator returns ==
Extended content

The totalisator returns declared to the licensing authorities for the year 1976 are listed below.

Stadium	Turnover £
London (White City)	7,171,665
London (Walthamstow)	6,064,978
London (Wimbledon)	5,003,053
London (Harringay)	3,623,272
London (Catford)	3,043,604
London (Wembley)	2,830,998
Romford	2,791,227
Manchester (Belle Vue)	2,220,451
Edinburgh (Powderhall)	2,058,957
Brighton & Hove	2,040,800
Birmingham (Perry Barr, old)	1,964,389
Slough	1,943,452
Birmingham (Hall Green)	1,850,297
Crayford & Bexleyheath	1,712,226
Southend-on-Sea	1,681,924
Newcastle (Brough Park)	1,474,211

Stadium	Turnover £
Leeds (Elland Road)	1,348,174
Glasgow (Shawfield)	1,299,425
Sheffield (Owlerton)	1,296,725
Wolverhampton (Monmore)	1,059,563
Manchester (White City)	1,021,854
Bristol (Eastville)	950,559
London (Hackney)	914,507
Rochester & Chatham	847,248
Derby	826,794
Gloucester & Cheltenham	794,251
Yarmouth	746,716
Cardiff (Arms Park)	714,614
Newcastle (Gosforth)	712,773
Willenhall	635,844
Portsmouth	554,330
Ramsgate (Dumpton Park)	492,386

Stadium	Turnover £
Reading	467,861
Poole	438,026
Oxford	418,730
Hull (Old Craven Park)	402,424
Cradley Heath	380,621
Milton Keynes	377,668
Middlesbrough	359,338
Manchester (Salford)	320,129
Leicester (Blackbird Rd)	313,524
Swindon	263,913
Rye House	240,275
Ipswich	213,311
Norton Canes	200,000
Preston	200,000
Halifax	58,496
