= 1967 UK & Ireland Greyhound Racing Year =

The 1967 UK & Ireland Greyhound Racing Year was the 42nd year of greyhound racing in the United Kingdom and the 41st year of greyhound racing in Ireland.

== Roll of honour ==
Major Winners
Award	Name of Winner
1967 English Greyhound Derby	Tric Trac
1967 Irish Greyhound Derby	Russian Gun
1967 Scottish Greyhound Derby	Hi Ho Silver
1967 Welsh Greyhound Derby	Not held
Greyhound Trainer of the Year	Jim Hookway
Greyhound of the Year	Carry on Oregon
Irish Greyhound of the Year	Yanka Boy

== Summary ==
The Bookmakers Afternoon Greyhound Service (BAGS) was formed to alleviate some of the ongoing problems of afternoon racing. The leading bookmaking firms funded BAGS who would pay the National Greyhound Racing Society (NGRS) a set fee for the off course rights. The NGRS would then distribute the money between all NGRC affiliated tracks. This system would continue until 1978. The first tracks selected to host the race meetings were Park Royal, Kings Heath, Stamford Bridge and Oxford.

Government tote tax was reduced from 5% to 2.5%. The annual totalisator turnover was £66,216,938 but attendances dipped below 10 million for the first time since 1927. There were 6009 meetings.

== Tracks ==
The expected sale of West Ham Stadium to the Greyhound Racing Association went ahead followed by the GRA purchase of Charlton Stadium. The GRA property trust then sold both within six years as they were redeveloped for housing and a shopping centre respectively.

Three new tracks opened, Blackpool (Borough Park), Clacton and Braintree (Cressing Road).

== News ==
Clapton Stadium installed a closed-circuit television race patrol camera that was able to replay the races to the public. Although very expensive the equipment was a hit and would set the scene for the future. Former track owner John Bilsland died in June leaving legacies to three universities and their electrical engineers departments. Geoff De Mulder took over the kennels from his father Joe De Mulder. Foot and mouth broke out towards the later part of the year causing major problems on the open race scene in England and Ireland.

== Competitions ==
The Crazy Parachute - Supreme Witch litter began to come to prominence, Forward Flash had won the Juvenile in 1966 and his brother Spectre II won the BBC Sportsview Television Trophy in April, with a track record in the final. Tric Trac and Spectre II then famously finished first and second in the 1967 English Greyhound Derby. After the final Tric-Trac was put to stud. The litter continued their good form when Forward Flash won the Manchester Cup and appeared in the Scottish Greyhound Derby final, while Forward King became Stewards' Cup champion as well as making the St Leger final along with litter sister Gezira at Wembley. Spectre II also won the Midlands St Leger at Wolverhampton.

Monalee Champion trained by Frank Conlon broke Fearless Mac's White City track record when winning the Longcross Cup, winning his semi-final by 16 lengths and defeating Tric-Trac in the final. After running up in the Gold Collar final his preparations for the English Derby were hit when Conlon lost his licence and the dog was transferred to Vicky Holloway. Carry on Oregon, a brindle dog, came to prominence by lifting the Scurry Gold Cup in July and within a month the Laurels at Wimbledon Stadium was won. Carry on Oregon would be voted as Greyhound of the year.

== Ireland ==
For the second successive year a greyhound won the double of the Easter Cup and Callanan Cup. The greyhound this time was Tinys Tidy Town who emulated Clomoney Grand's 1966 achievement. Tinys Tidy Town then joined Gay McKenna for a tilt at the English Derby.

== Principal UK races ==
Grand National, White City (April 22 525y h, £500)
Pos	Name of Greyhound	Trainer	SP	Time	Trap
1st	The Grange Santa	Nora Gleeson	9-4f	29.72	1
2nd	Corville Cadet	John Shevlin	4-1	29.94	3
3rd	Officer Skite		4-1	30.08	6
4th	Minnies Rover		11-2	30.48	2
5th	Innsbruck	Clare Orton	3-1	30.51	4
N/R	I'm Out	John Bassett			5

BBC Sportsview TV Trophy Brighton (Apr 25, 880y, £1,000)
Pos	Name of Greyhound	Trainer	SP	Time	Trap
1st	Spectre II	Jim Hookway	1-1f	50.09+	4
2nd	Miss Taft	Bob Burls	4-1	50.47	6
3rd	K P Yew	Kenric Appleton	14-1	50.91	5
4th	Jerpoint Button		5-1	51.25	1
5th	Husky Crazy	Pat Butler	9-2	51.51	2
6th	Sonora		33-1	51.69	3

+Track Record

Gold Collar, Catford (May 13, 570y, £1,500)
Pos	Name of Greyhound	Trainer	SP	Time	Trap
1st	Stylish Lad	Jack Smith	5-2	33.75	5
2nd	Monalee Champion	Frank Conlon	2-1f	34.03	4
3rd	Cons Duke	Dave Barker	6-1	34.27	2
4th	Coolkill Wonder	Geoff De Mulder	5-1	34.47	1
5th	Jerpoint Peric		12-1	34.53	6
6th	Roamin Beauty	Paddy Keane	9-2	34.65	5

Oaks, Harringay (Jul 3, 525y, £1,000)
Pos	Name of Greyhound	Trainer	SP	Time	Trap
1st	Solerina	Janice Thistleton	12-1	29.50	3
2nd	Kit Blakeney	Paddy Keane	4-5f	29.56	1
3rd	Westland Lucy		7-1	29.62	6
4th	Bregorteen Lass	Stan Gudgin	16-1	29.86	2
5th	Roamin Beauty	Paddy Keane	4-1	30.02	5
6th	Ciarraidhe	John Bassett	6-1	30.34	4

Scurry Gold Cup, Clapton (Jul 15, 400y £1,000)
Pos	Name of Greyhound	Trainer	SP	Time	Trap
1st	Carry On Oregon	Clare Orton	1-2f	22.62	6
2nd	Glittering Image	Stan Gudgin	10-1	23.00	3
3rd	Merry Rambler		40-1	23.22	4
4th	Roamin Beauty	Paddy Keane	7-2	23.30	1
5th	The Golfer		16-1	23.31	2
6th	Fawn Duke	Phil Rees Sr.	10-1	23.77	5

Laurels, Wimbledon (Aug 11, 500y, £1,500)
Pos	Name of Greyhound	Trainer	SP	Time	Trap
1st	Carry On Oregon	Clare Orton	8-13f	27.89	6
2nd	The Higgler	Bob Burls	5-1	28.37	5
3rd	Special Prairie		25-1	28.41	4
4th	Joans Lion		4-1	28.49	1
5th	Any Half	Jimmy Rimmer	16-1	28.67	3
6th	Barna		50-1	28.87	2

Scottish Greyhound Derby, Carntyne (Sep 2, 525y, £1,000)
Pos	Name of Greyhound	Trainer	SP	Time	Trap
1st	Hi Ho Silver	Norman Oliver	5-2	28.90	1
2nd	Any M's	Bill 'Willie' Weir	9-4jf	29.06	6
3rd	Super Kid	Joe Pickering	12-1	29.18	4
4th	Forward Flash	Jack Brennan	9-4jf	29.82	5
5th	Castle Fame	Joe Pickering	7-1	29.84	3
6th	King Flash		8-1	30.14	2

St Leger, Wembley (Sep 4, 700y, £1,500)
Pos	Name of Greyhound	Trainer	SP	Time	Trap
1st	O'Haras Rebel	Bob Burls	6-1	39.54	3
2nd	Big Steve	Wilf France	7-4f	39.92	1
3rd	High St Boy	Colin McNally	12-1	40.04	4
4th	Sock Tray Dromin	Jack Harvey	5-2	40.16	2
5th	Gezira	John Brown	12-1	40.34	5
6th	Forward King	Ted Brennan	7-2	40.46	6

Cesarewitch, West Ham (Oct 6, 600y, £1,500)
Pos	Name of Greyhound	Trainer	SP	Time	Trap
1st	Silver Hope	Paddy Keane	2-1f	32.99	5
2nd	Cheek to Cheek	Paddy Keane	9-4	33.15	2
3rd	Cullen Era	Clare Orton	11-2	33.37	1
4th	Corville Gallant	John Bassett	5-1	33.41	4
5th	Lambeth Walk	John Bassett	5-1	33.51	3
6th	Kilrea Power	Les Parry	25-1	33.99	6

== Totalisator returns ==
Extended content

The totalisator returns declared to the licensing authorities for the year 1967 are listed below.

Stadium	Turnover £
London (White City)	6,496,117
London (Wimbledon)	4,181,060
London (Harringay)	3,912,082
London (Walthamstow)	3,409,092
London (Wembley)	2,715,432
London (Catford)	2,257,763
London (Clapton)	2,209,495
Manchester (Belle Vue)	2,031,408
London (West Ham)	1,998,003
London (Hendon)	1,580,493
Romford	1,489,670
Edinburgh (Powderhall)	1,468,453
London (New Cross)	1,462,718
Birmingham (Perry Barr, old)	1,394,941
London (Stamford Bridge)	1,383,794
London (Charlton)	1,312,037
Manchester (White City)	1,241,441
London (Hackney)	1,220,070
Brighton & Hove	1,213,400

Stadium	Turnover £
Birmingham (Hall Green)	1,189,816
Newcastle (Brough Park)	1,092,931
London (Park Royal)	1,062,006
Glasgow (Shawfield)	1,036,705
Slough	924,780
Glasgow (White City)	921,383
Wolverhampton (Monmore)	920,735
Crayford & Bexleyheath	874,413
Leeds (Elland Road)	845,570
Sheffield (Owlerton)	840,143
Manchester (Salford)	803,470
Bristol (Eastville)	758,536
Southend-on-Sea	716,234
Birmingham (Kings Heath)	703,273
Willenhall	680,646
Gloucester & Cheltenham	662,667
Newcastle (Gosforth)	645,751
Cardiff (Arms Park)	618,901
Liverpool (White City)	575,558

Stadium	Turnover £
Reading (Oxford Road)	571,035
Bradford (Greenfield)	569,377
Ramsgate (Dumpton Park)	562,006
Derby	508,614
Poole	502,555
Glasgow (Carntyne)	475,066
Cradley Heath	467,572
Rochester & Chatham	465,577
Oxford	424,069
Portsmouth	405,027
Middlesbrough	352,286
Leicester (Blackbird Rd)	331,339
Hull (Old Craven Park)	329,344
Preston	329,344
Nottingham (White City)	320,564
Aberdeen	272,181
Rayleigh (Essex)	226,821
Norwich (City)	225,514
