= 1967 Irish Greyhound Derby =

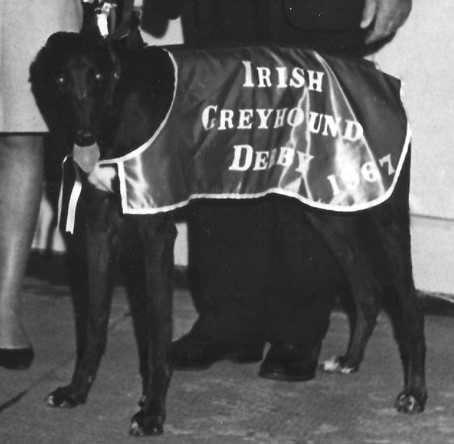
- Russian Gun
- Venue: Harold's Cross Stadium
- Location: Dublin
- End date: 4 August
- Total prize money: £2,000 (winner)

The 1967 Irish Greyhound Derby took place during July and August with the final being held at Harold's Cross Stadium in Dublin on 4 August 1967.

The winner Russian Gun won £2,000 and was trained by Tom Lynch, owned by Hugh Marley and bred by Frank Muldoon.

== Final result ==
At Harold's Cross, 4 August (over 525 yards):

Position	Winner	Breeding	Trap	SP	Time	Trainer
1st	Russian Gun	Pigalle Wonder - Shandaroba	3	5-1	29.44	Tom Lynch
2nd	Dry Flash	Prairie Flash - Newhill Snowdrop	6	3-1	29.68	
3rd	Hurricane Bertie	Prairie Flash - unknown	2	10-1	29.84	
4th	Ricard Flash	Prairie Flash - unknown	1	11-4f		
5th	Proud Lincoln	Clonalvy Pride - Gettysburgh Princess	4	7-2		Ger McKenna
6th	Baled Hay	Prairie Flash - unknown	5	5-1	00.00	

=== Distances ===
3, 2 (lengths)

== Competition Report ==
Legendary Irish trainer Tom Lynch was ill in hospital when he received a telephone call from a Portadown building contractor called Hugh Marley. Marley had seen his black dog Russian Gun eliminated from the 1967 English Greyhound Derby at the qualifying round stage but persuaded Lynch to train him for a tilt at the Irish Derby. Marley had paid breeder Frank Muldoon £3,000 for greyhound.

During the first round Yanka Boy recorded 29.31, Public Reply (the McAlinden Cup winner) won in 29.32; other winners were Ricard Flash 29.37, Proud Lincoln 29.44, Whiteleas Gift (Produce Stake winner) 29.61 and Sutton Valley 29.64.

In round two Whiteleas Gift impressed after setting a very fast time of 29.20 and both Mount Mick and Hack It Buffalo went very well recording 29.24 and 29.37 respectively. Yanka Boy won again and Dry Flash beat Russian Gun, the latter still yet to win a heat.

Before the semi-finals Yanka Boy and Whiteleas Gift were the new competition favourites but the round proved pivotal as the major names crashed out, the first semi saw Hurricane Bertie defeat Dry Flash with Yanka Boy managing just third place. Baled Hay beat Ricard Flash in the second heat before Proud Lincoln won the third from Russian Gun with Whiteleas Gift failing to make the final.

When the traps rose for the final Russian Gun (normally a slow starter) bolted from the traps and that was that, the crowd knew there would be no catching him and he duly wrapped up an easy victory in 29.44. Dry Flash ran well for second place with the strong finishing Hurricane Bertie taking third place. It was to be the last Derby ever held at Harold's Cross.

== See also ==
- 1967 UK & Ireland Greyhound Racing Year
