= 1987 UK & Ireland Greyhound Racing Year =

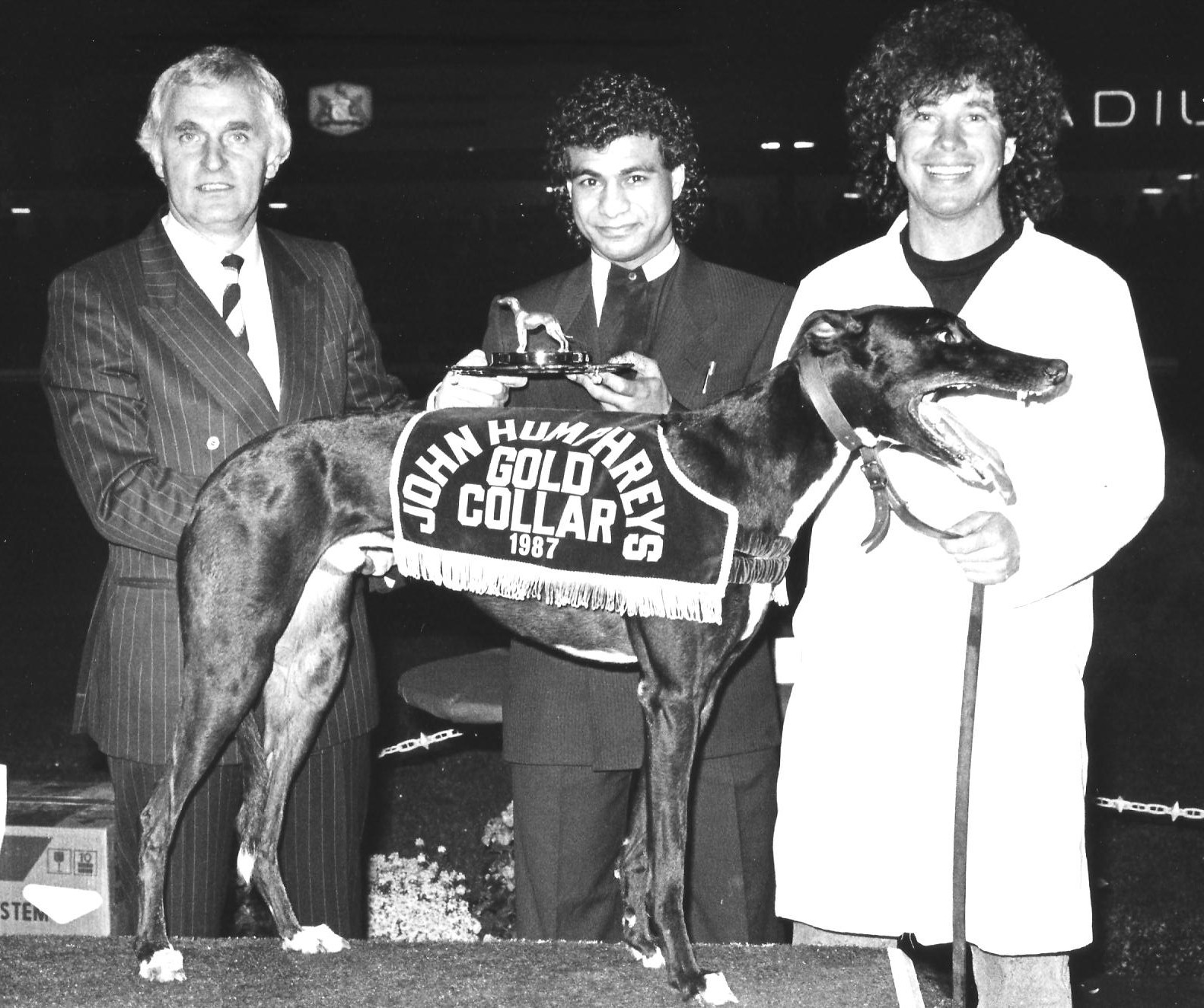
- 1987 Gold Collar winner Half Awake and trainer Barry Silkman (far right)

The 1987 UK & Ireland Greyhound Racing Year was the 62nd year of greyhound racing in the United Kingdom and the 61st year of greyhound racing in Ireland.

== Roll of honour ==
Major Winners
Award	Name of Winner
1987 English Greyhound Derby	Signal Spark
1987 Irish Greyhound Derby	Rathgallen Tady
1987 Scottish Greyhound Derby	Princes Pal
Greyhound Trainer of the Year	Fred Wiseman
Greyhound of the Year	Signal Spark
Irish Greyhound of the Year	Randy
Trainers Championship	Geoff De Mulder

== Summary ==
The performances of Ballyregan Bob and Scurlogue Champ during the two previous years, combined with a strong UK economy resulted in a significant increase in greyhound racing popularity. The National Greyhound Racing Club (NGRC) released the annual returns, with totalisator turnover up nearly 20% at £77,832,636 and attendances up over 5% recorded at 4,020,438 from 5255 meetings. Track tote remained at 17.5% and a further boost to the industry came when the government abolished tote tax on 29 March.

Major changes took place within the Greyhound Racing Association (GRA), the company merged with Wembley Stadium owners Arena Holdings to form a new company. The new company retained the GRA name and is valued at £68.5 million. In March the company closed Slough Stadium and six months later in September they closed Harringay Stadium which had been sold to Sainsbury's in 1985.

Satellite Information Services began to beam pictures into the betting shops from the 5 May, the company owned by the 'Big Four' Ladbrokes, Corals, William Hill and Mecca Bookmakers would pay the greyhound racing industry a fee for the televised rights. Ladbrokes however abstained from negotiations because they owned some of the tracks involved. Corals also owned some tracks involved but had the foresight to realise that they should pay a fee to help maintain the health of the industry. Ladbrokes actions only further enhanced the belief that bookmakers had too much control of the industry which was already subject to an investigation by the Office of Fair Trading. The negotiations ended with the NGRC charging £300 per each S.I.S meeting in addition to an extra 10% of the track's BAGS fee which prompts Ladbrokes to seek legal advice.

== Tracks ==
Two more tracks closed along with Harringay and Slough, they were Clacton and Chester but four also opened, those of Barrow, Canterbury, Swaffham and Bideford.

Hall Green underwent refurbishment costing £400,000 and Powderhall's new grandstand was completed costing £750,000 but suffered a fire that then caused £25,000 damage. The Scottish Greyhound Derby rights, held by GRA meant that Edinburgh would hold the event for the first time leaving Glasgow with no classic race. Shawfield Greyhound Racing and Leisure Company Ltd re-opened the Shawfield despite not having the Scottish Derby as their blue riband event.

== Competitions ==
Harringay's closure resulted in the Oaks going to Wimbledon Stadium and the Pall Mall Stakes going to Oxford. The Scurry Gold Cup switched to Catford Stadium following the closure of Slough. Crayford took possession of the Golden Jacket after spells at Hall Green and Monmore. Harringay had also held the event in the afternoon and it was very popular due to the television exposure of the event. Crayford also provided a new matinee meeting for their own Ladbrokes betting shops. Role of Fame made amends for a disappointing TV Trophy performance at Oxford by winning the Cesarewitch at Belle Vue.

The Savva camp had a double success towards the latter part of the year. First with Olivers Wish (from the same litter as Westmead Move) who won the £5,000 Gold Collar. Then in the Laurels at Wimbledon, Flashy Sir beat a field that included Derby champion Signal Spark.

== News ==
Trainers Ray Peacock and Linda Mullins joined Catford and Romford respectively from Harringay, Pam Heasman joined Wembley. Trainer Joe Booth died in hospital and George Curtis retired to be replaced by head man Bill Masters.

The kennel of Gary Baggs contained Puppy Derby champion Spiral Darkie, in addition to Fifty Pence, Fiddlers Run, Signal Spark and Karens Champ. Signal Spark emerged as the star when winning the 1987 English Greyhound Derby. Signal Spark was then transferred to Ernie Gaskin following a well-documented dispute between Gary Baggs and owner Towfiq Al-Aali, resulting in the latter removing his dogs from the Walthamstow trainer. Fred Wiseman also had a strong kennel including Scurry champion Rapid Mover, head man John McGee was credited for much of the success from the kennel. Signal Spark was voted Greyhound of the Year.

== Principal UK races ==
Grand National, Hall Green (Mar 28, 474m h, £3,000)
Pos	Name of Greyhound	Trainer	SP	Time	Trap
1st	Cavan Town	Mel Cumner	4-1	30.01	4
2nd	Monroe Tiger		20-1	30.04	3
3rd	Mondays Cannon	Phil Rees Jr.	5-2	30.08	1
4th	Parktown Ranger	Tom Foster	7-1	30.24	2
5th	Distant Echo	Mel Fordham	11-2	30.42	5
6th	Diamonds Sparkle	Stan Gudgin	6-4f	30.70	6

BBC TV Trophy, Oxford (April 8, 845m, £4,000)
Pos	Name of Greyhound	Trainer	SP	Time	Trap
1st	Glenowen Queen	Dick Hawkes	7-1	53.37	4
2nd	Super Spell	Tony Martin	33-1	53.55	6
3rd	Change Guard	Trevor Draper	5-1	53.59	5
4th	Role of Fame	Adam Jackson	4-9f	53.67	1
5th	Tender Champ	Walter Dewbury	10-1	54.27	3
6th	Irish Pallas	Ernie Wiseman	50-1	55.27	2

Scurry Gold Cup, Catford (Jul 18, 385m, £5,000)
Pos	Name of Greyhound	Trainer	SP	Time	Trap
1st	Rapid Mover	Fred Wiseman	1-1f	23.62	2
2nd	Lyons Turbo	Kenny Linzell	25-1	23.80	4
3rd	Quarrymount Sigh	John Honeysett	7-1	23.86	6
4th	High St Franz	Linda Mullins	5-1	23.92	3
5th	Lively Sailor	John Gibbons	10-1	23.98	1
6th	Up For One	Mick Puzey	7-2	24.00	5

St Leger, Wembley (Aug 28, 655m, £12,500)
Pos	Name of Greyhound	Trainer	SP	Time	Trap
1st	Life Policy	Bob Young	12-1	39.96	5
2nd	Lone Wolf	Bill Masters	5-2	40.06	6
3rd	Longcross Jim	Phil Rees Jr.	7-1	40.20	2
4th	Yellow Emperor	Derek Knight	6-4f	40.40	1
5th	Bankers Benefit	Adam Jackson	6-1	40.58	3
6th	Deal Now	Geoff De Mulder	6-1	40.82	4

Scottish Greyhound Derby, Powderhall (Aug 29, 465m, £10,000)
Pos	Name of Greyhound	Trainer	SP	Time	Trap
1st	Princes Pal	Matt Travers	1-1f	27.58	2
2nd	Killouragh Chris	Pete Beamount	6-1	27.74	5
3rd	Karens Champ	Gary Baggs	11-2	27.88	3
4th	Twiggys Rose	Hugh Davies	33-1	28.06	1
5th	Fiddlers Run	Gary Baggs	14-1	28.07	6
6th	Tapwatcher	Bob Young	3-1	dnf	4

Gold Collar, Catford (Sep 19, 555m, £5,000)
Pos	Name of Greyhound	Trainer	SP	Time	Trap
1st	Half Awake	Barry Silkman	4-1	34.90	4
2nd	Justa Mo	Dinky Luckhurst	2-1f	35.02	1
3rd	Moths Dysert	Mick Puzey	4-1	35.20	6
4th	Eldorado	Bob Young	4-1	35.32	2
5th	Blackie Comehome	John Honeysett	16-1	35.48	5
6th	Rashane Glory	Hugh Davies	7-2	35.58	3

Cesarewitch, Belle Vue (Sep 26, 853m, £3,000)
Pos	Name of Greyhound	Trainer	SP	Time	Trap
1st	Role Of Fame	Arthur Hitch	1-7f	52.41	1
2nd	Denes Mutt	Fred Wiseman	10-1	53.01	2
3rd	Gotoon Peg	Carol Aymes	20-1	53.31	6
4th	Mollifrend Es	Colin Packham	8-1	53.37	4
5th	Little Dragonfly	John Coleman	14-1	53.65	5
6th	Tender Champ	Walter Dewberry	12-1	53.68	3

The Grand Prix, Walthamstow (Oct 10, 640m, £5,000)
Pos	Name of Greyhound	Trainer	SP	Time	Trap
1st	Olivers Wish	Nick Savva	7-2	39.86	4
2nd	Super Duchess	Kim Marlow	6-4f	39.98	2
3rd	Moths Dysert	Mick Puzey	4-1	40.08	6
4th	Winsor Way	Fred Wiseman	7-1	40.44	5
5th	Giblet	Ernie Gaskin Sr.	16-1	40.74	1
6th	Silver Walk	Ernie Gaskin Sr.	7-1	40.80	3

Oaks, Harringay (Oct 23, 475m, £5,000)
Pos	Name of Greyhound	Trainer	SP	Time	Trap
1st	Lucky Empress	Allen Briggs	2-1	28.43	6
2nd	Foretop	Kenny Linzell	7-4f	28.57	1
3rd	Louise Champion	Eric Vose	5-1	28.79	3
4th	Holiday Hope	Pat Ryan	6-1	28.89	5
5th	Giblet	Ernie Gaskin Sr.	20-1	29.03	2
6th	Dominique	Phil Rees Jr.	12-1	29.11	4

Laurels, Wimbledon (Dec 26, 460m, £5,000)
Pos	Name of Greyhound	Trainer	SP	Time	Trap
1st	Flashy Sir	Nick Savva	11-4	27.52	2
2nd	Pike Alert	Tom Foster	10-1	27.66	3
3rd	Wendys Dream	Tom Foster	8-1	27.78	4
4th	Signal Spark	Ernie Gaskin Sr.	1-2f	27.84	5
5th	Skomal	Barry Silkman	14-1	27.86	1
N/R	Lissadell Tiger	Ernie Gaskin Sr.			

== Totalisator returns ==
Extended content

The totalisator returns declared to the National Greyhound Racing Club for the year 1987 are listed below.

Stadium	Turnover £
London (Walthamstow)	12,915,186
London (Wimbledon)	11,992,684
London (Catford)	5,328,078
London (Wembley)	5,199,032
Brighton & Hove	4,956,464
Romford	4,913,624
Birmingham (Hall Green)	3,011,000
Manchester (Belle Vue)	2,830,723
London (Harringay)	2,319,045
Crayford	2,296,855
Edinburgh (Powderhall)	1,789,171
Newcastle (Brough Park)	1,694,113
Oxford	1,691,894

Stadium	Turnover £
Sheffield (Owlerton)	1,552,649
Ramsgate	1,409,112
Wolverhampton (Monmore)	1,397,324
Yarmouth	1,145,974
Portsmouth	1,124,862
Maidstone	1,007,390
Glasgow (Shawfield)	992,903
Reading	873,921
Bristol	791,570
Milton Keynes	762,064
London (Hackney)	720,476
Swindon	634,107
Derby	598,136

Stadium	Turnover £
Henlow (Bedfordshire)	514,742
Rye House	472,527
Hull (Old Craven Park)	467,553
Poole	439,697
Nottingham	363,550
Middlesbrough	346,800
Cradley Heath	329,951
Peterborough	325,466
Norton Canes	320,783
Ipswich	150,111
Canterbury	135,000
