= 1976 English Greyhound Derby =

- Location: White City Stadium
- Start date: 5 June
- End date: 26 June
- Total prize money: £15,000 (winner)

The 1976 Spillers Greyhound Derby took place during June with the final being held on 26 June 1976 at White City Stadium. The winner was Mutts Silver and the winning owners, a syndicate headed by Ray Lancaster received £15,000. The competition was sponsored by the Spillers.

== Final result ==
At White City (over 500 metres):

Position	Name of Greyhound	Breeding	Trap	SP	Time	Trainer
1st	Mutts Silver	The Grand Silver - Simple Pride	4	6-1	29.38	Phil Rees Sr. (Wimbledon)
2nd	Ballybeg Prim	Rockfield Era - Ballybeg Pride	5	4-5f	29.56	Ger McKenna (Ireland)
3rd	Westmead Myra	Myrtown - Westmead Silver	6	20-1	29.84	Natalie Savva (Bletchley)
4th	Xmas Holiday	Supreme Fun - Mary's Snowball	1	5-1	29.86	Phil Rees Sr. (Wimbledon)
5th	Jackies Jet	Monalee Champion - Greek Jackie	2	7-1	30.02	Geoff De Mulder (Hall Green)
6th	Westmead Champ	Westmead County - Hacksaw	3	3-1	30.08	Pam Heasman (Hackney)

=== Distances ===
2¼, 3½, head, 2, ¾ (lengths)
The distances between the greyhounds are in finishing order and shown in lengths. One length is equal to 0.08 of one second.

== Competition Report ==
The previous system of having two non-betting qualifying rounds was scrapped and replaced by just one, which required the field to be whittled down to 48 runners by the time of the actual second round. Ireland's leading trainer Ger McKenna had sent a team over that included ante-post favourite Ballybeg Prim and Shamrock Point who had been unfortunate the year before. The Laurels beaten favourite Sean Na Gaisce and Xmas Holiday were also well represented in the ante-post lists.

In the qualifying round on 5 June Ballybeg Prim equalled the track record (29.23 set by Myrtown). During the second round Ballybeg Prim beat Xmas Holiday in 29.47 with Flip Your Top and Westmead Champ setting the fastest times with 29.28 and 29.34 respectively. Shamrock Point provided a record-breaking quarter-final success in 29.18sec and then Ballybeg Prim (the deposed track record holder) beat Mutts Silver. Flip Your Top defeated Xmas Holiday before Westmead Myra won the final heat but Sean Na Gaisce went out after trouble.

Mutts Silver (owned by Sporting Life) won a hard semi-final from Jackies Jet and Ballybeg Prim with Flip Your Top and Shamrock Point both failing to make the final. The second semi resulted in Westmead Champ beating Xmas Holiday and Westmead Myra.

In the final Mutts Silver showed a burst of early speed to slip round the bend in front. Ballybeg Prim made some inroads into the leader's advantage, but Mutts Silver could not be caught. Mutts Silver had been bought by a syndicate headed by Ray Lancaster, editor of the Sporting Life who had tasked the greyhound editor Archie Newhouse to find a dog for the Derby and British breeding was well represented in the final by Nick and Natalie Savva who had bred Westmead Myra and Westmead Champ.

== See also ==
- 1976 UK & Ireland Greyhound Racing Year
