= 1987 English Greyhound Derby =

- Location: Wimbledon Stadium
- End date: 30 June
- Total prize money: £30,000 (winner)

The 1987 Daily Mirror Greyhound Derby took place during May and June with the final being held on 30 June 1987 at Wimbledon Stadium. The winner was Signal Spark and the winning owner Towfiq Al-Aali received £30,000. The competition was sponsored by the Daily Mirror.

== Final result ==
At Wimbledon (over 480 metres):

Position	Name of Greyhound	Breeding	Trap	SP	Time	Trainer
1st	Signal Spark	Echo Spark - Balbec Duchess	4	14-1	28.83	Gary Baggs (Walthamstow)
2nd	Tapwatcher	The Stranger - Jims Lady	5	11-10f	28.84	Bob Young (Hove)
3rd	Rikasso Tiller	Mathews World - Kilflynn Hiker	3	3-1	29.09	Theo Mentzis (Milton Keynes)
4th	Slaneyside Speed	Echo Spark - Prince of Rocks	6	7-1	29.12	Geoff De Mulder (Oxford)
5th	Enecee	Echo Spark - Summer Nut	1	5-1	29.18	Geoff De Mulder (Oxford)
6th	Stouke Whisper	Whisper Wishes - Stouke Playgirl	2	12-1	29.46	John Honeysett (Wembley)

=== Distances ===
Short head, 3, neck, ¾, 3½ (lengths)
The distances between the greyhounds are in finishing order and shown in lengths. One length is equal to 0.08 of one second.

== Competition report ==
In the opening heat of the qualifying round a greyhound called Tapwatcher recorded 28.65sec a time which propelled him up into being one of the favourites for the competition outright. He followed this up in round one by defeating Mollifrend Lucky. Local runner and leading contender Monroe Luck (Phil Rees), Pagan Chimes and Old Sloucher (Ger McKenna) all won well on heavy going in round two but Tapwatcher and Signal Spark were the only favourites to win during this round.

In the quarter-finals Mollifrend Lucky broke his hock as he came out of the traps finishing badly lame, Pagan Chimes went on to win the heat from Hot Sauce Yankee. Tapwatcher defeated Signal Spark in heat two and Enecee from the DeMulder kennels won the third heat in 28.66. Serserry beat Stouke Whisper and Flashy Sir to finish off the round.

Rikasso Tiller staked his claim in the semi-finals with victory from Enecee and the strong finishing Stouke Whisper. Pagan Chimes, Hot Sauce Yankee and Flashy Sir were eliminated. The second semi was won by Tapwatcher who comfortably beat a field which included Slaneyside Speed and Signal Spark.

The final betting sent off Tapwatcher as the strong favourite but it was Enecee that started best with Tapwatcher and Signal Spark tucked in behind, the pair touched when overtaking Enecee allowing Signal Spark to take the lead. Tapwatcher began to pull the lead back and as they reached the finishing line the pair crossed line together in a photo finish. Wimbledon Racing Manager Bob Rowe stated that it was the closest Derby finish in history with the verdict going to Signal Spark.

== See also ==
- 1987 UK & Ireland Greyhound Racing Year
