= White City Stadium (Newcastle) =

Former sports venue

- Interactive map of White City Stadium (Newcastle)
- Location: Scotswood Bridge, Blaydon on Tyne, County Durham
- Coordinates: 54°57′53.743″N 1°41′33.946″W
- Field size: 485 yards circumference

Construction
- Opened: 1937
- Closed: 1951

Tenants
- Greyhound racing (1937–1951); Newcastle RLFC (1937–1938)

White City Stadium (Newcastle) was a greyhound racing, near Scotswood Bridge in Blaydon on Tyne, County Durham.

== Origins ==
In 1928, United Stadium and Greyhound Racecourse (Newcastle) Ltd secured the lease of Towneley Park and with £2,250 capital, constructed a greyhound track just south of the River Tyne at the end of the Scotswood Bridge, between the river and the Redheugh Branch railway line. The existing site was being used by the Scotswood Football Club from at least the 1919 season. It was the first greyhound track to open in Newcastle. The greyhound racing opened on 26 May 1928 and Brough Park would open just 28 days later whilst Gosforth did not appear until 1932 and Gateshead 1937, resulting in four rival tracks.

== Opening ==
In 1937, and within 100 yards Towneley Park on the east side a new sports stadium as constructed. The 12 acres site and stadium gained the name White City and could entertain 24,000 spectators. There were two car parks situated on either side of the stadium, off Chain Bridge Road with the entrance sporting some picturesque gardens. The main stand on the home straight featured a 300 feet wide 'Senior Club' upstairs with three bar lounges and glass fronted viewing above the tote hall and offices. The Senior Club could be accessed from the 3 shillings and 4 shillings 6 pence enclosures with an annual subscription of 2 shillings 6 pence. On the fourth bend there was a 'Junior Club' within the two shillings enclosure that also included two stands, totalisator and snack bar. The paddock and racing kennels were situated near the first bend with the resident and isolation kennels set further back on the second bend.

Newcastle RLFC moved to the stadium from Brough Park Stadium for the 1937–1938 season and the greyhound racing started on 7 October 1937.

The greyhound track was described as a very good galloping track with long 100 yard straights and easy bends with a 550-yard distance in one circuit behind an 'Inside Sumner' hare system. By 1940 the distances were established as 325, 525, 550 and 700 yards and were verified with a racecard notice by the NGRC's official measurer Mr G E Marshall. As the war approached business remained steady under the leadership of General Manager Mr J A Melville and the Racing Manager Mr T Greggs.

In 1939, a controlling interest of the stadium was acquired by Major J. Scarvell Cape, representing the Greyhound Racing Association (Newcastle) Ltd and Julius Totalisators.

== Closure ==
Despite excellent facilities and a profitable business problems arose after the war, the totalisator turnover was a healthy £1,106,242 in 1946 at its peak, lowering to £606,005 one year later. The problems came about because of the controversial government taxation of greyhound racing towards the end of the 1940s. It was in 1951 that Managing Director Mr Whatley reported that tote receipts were £75,000 of which £47,000 was taken out by taxation. The government policy continued to make matters difficult for greyhound racing totalisators with close scrutiny and restrictions of gambling still considered in the interests of the general public.

The net result for White City was the closure of the track on 26 May 1951. Tyneside lost its first greyhound track and the site became a depot and then eventually industrial units on Toll Bridge Road.
