= 1962 UK & Ireland Greyhound Racing Year =

British greyhound racing year

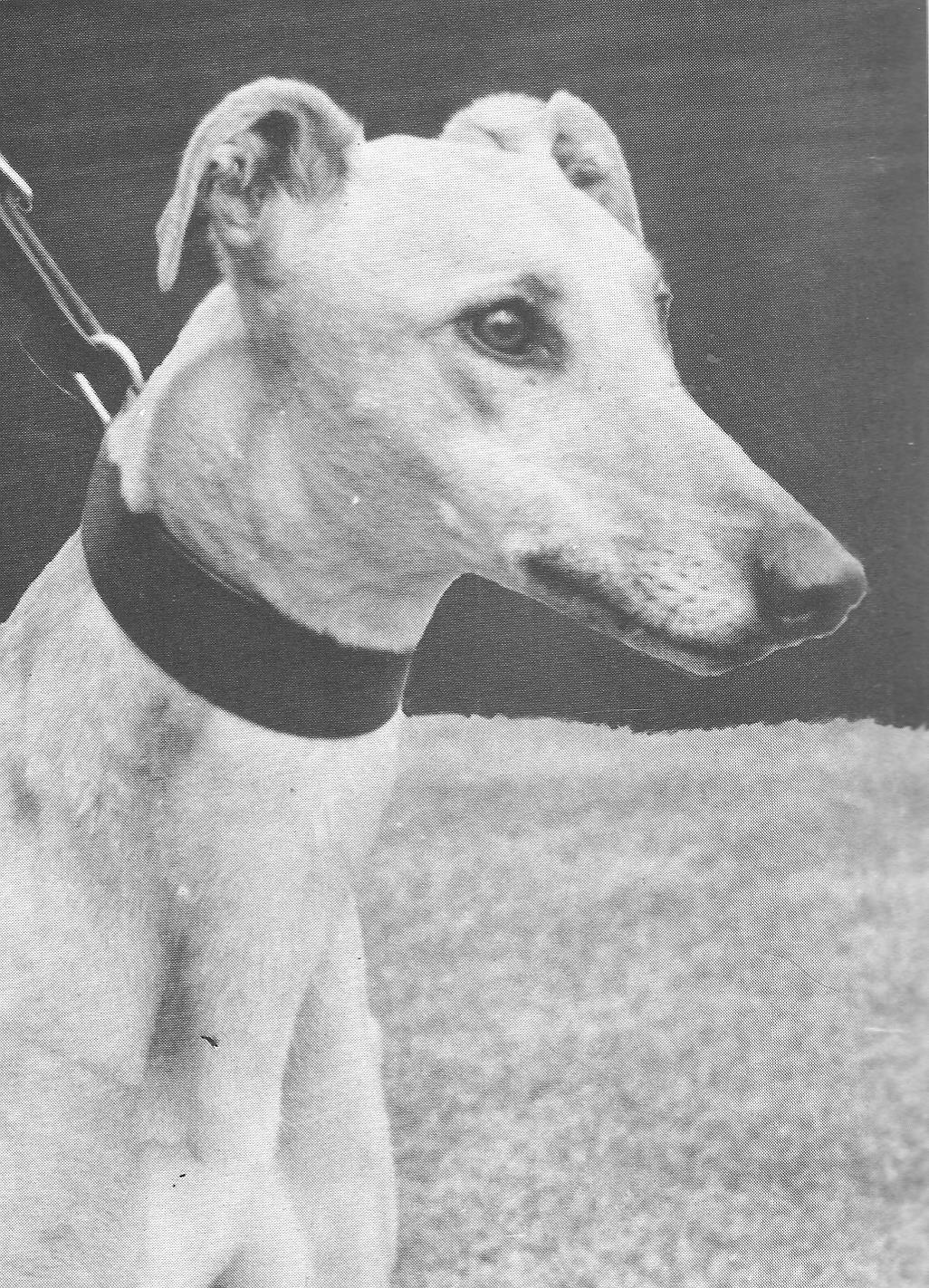
- Ballinasloe Blondie won her second consecutive Oaks title

The 1962 UK & Ireland Greyhound Racing Year was the 37th year of greyhound racing in the United Kingdom and the 36th year of greyhound racing in Ireland.

== Roll of honour ==
Major Winners
Award	Name of Winner
1962 English Greyhound Derby	The Grand Canal
1962 Irish Greyhound Derby	Shane's Legacy
1962 Scottish Greyhound Derby	Dromin Glory
1962 Welsh Greyhound Derby	Summerhill Fancy
Greyhound Trainer of the Year	John Haynes
Greyhound of the Year	Dromin Glory

== Summary ==
The decrease in attendances continued as a result of the Betting and Gaming Act 1960, which contributed to more track closures. Boundary Park Stadium in the Hellesdon area of Norwich closed on 1 December 1962, to become a redeveloped site for the Eastern Electricity Company. Rochdale switched to independent status and Charlton Stadium closed after difficulties (it would re-open four years later however), in the meantime their top event the Cloth of Gold would take place at Wandsworth Stadium.

English Greyhound Derby finalist Dromin Glory, a brindle dog trained by John Bassett had a brilliant year winning both the Scottish Greyhound Derby and Cesarewitch at West Ham Stadium in consecutive months. This was achieved in addition to lifting the Birmingham Cup, Gymcrack and Select Stakes and was voted Greyhound of the Year.

== Competitions ==
The Grand National at White City was finally given recognition as a classic event; the race offered £500 for the first time in 1961 a winner's prize worthy of its status.

Avis won the TV Trophy and the George Waterman trained brindle dog Summerhill Fancy had an excellent year, winning the Welsh Greyhound Derby, the International, the Chelsea Cup, the Flying Four and Evening Standard Trophy.

== News ==
As a result of the death of Leslie Reynolds, Wembley appointed Jack Kinsley to take up the vacant range at the Wembley kennels. This in turn allowed Stan Gudgin to take over Jack Kinsley's range at Park Royal Stadium. Tom Johnston Sr. retired and his son Tom Johnston Jr. took over his range at West Ham Stadium. Johnston Sr. had won the 1928 English Greyhound Derby with Boher Ash when based in Scotland.

Following the decision to cover all sports the Greyhound Express is renamed the Sporting and Greyhound Express.

Francis Steward Gentle chairman of the Greyhound Racing Association and president of the NGRS died on 25 September, he leaves an estate of £181,750.

Coronation Street featured an episode at Raikes Park Greyhound Stadium and a racing greyhound called Lucky Lolita (real name Black Star).

== Ireland ==
The Grand Canal, the English Derby winner and Easter Cup returned a hero when returning to Irish shores, after winning the English Derby.

1962 Irish Greyhound Derby winner Shanes Legacy was sold after the final presentation by owner Bob McCann, for £2,500 to London building contractor Bob Gough who put the greyhound with Tony Dennis. Dark Baby went on to win the Laurels at Cork and break the track record.

== Principal UK races ==
Grand National, White City (April 28 525y h, £500)
Pos	Name of Greyhound	Trainer	SP	Time	Trap
1st	Corsican Reward	Gordon Hodson	9-4f	30.15	2
2nd	January Prince		11-4	30.35	1
3rd	Sabena's Prince	Les Parry	4-1	30.36	3
4th	R.S.11	George Waterman	8-1	30.66	4
5th	Aughadown Dante		6-1	31.38	6
6th	Stanbrook Rob		100-7	00.00	5

Gold Collar, Catford (May 19, 440y, £1,000)
Pos	Name of Greyhound	Trainer	SP	Time	Trap
1st	Super Orange	Pam Heasman	4-1	25.51	5
2nd	Shannon Spirit	Phil Rees Sr.	5-4f	25.87	3
3rd	Her Brumas	Barney O'Connor	12-1	25.93	4
4th	Tuturama	Frank Sanderson	3-1	26.01	2
5th	Cassagh Major	Bob Burls	12-1	26.17	6
6th	Thornhill Imp		12-1	26.18	1

Welsh Derby, Arms Park (Jul 7, 525y £500)
Pos	Name of Greyhound	Trainer	SP	Time	Trap
1st	Summerhill Fancy	George Waterman	3-1	29.07	1
2nd	Laurdella Dancer	Bob Burls	100-6	29.27	2
3rd	In Town Tonight	Jim Irving	6-1	29.41	4
4th	Trip To Dublin	Hugo Spencer	6-4f	29.61	5
5th	Bell Song		20-1	29.85	3
6th	Black July	Harry O'Neill	5-2	29.86	6

Oaks, Harringay (Jul 9, 525y, £500)
Pos	Name of Greyhound	Trainer	SP	Time	Trap
1st	Ballinasloe Blondie	Jack Harvey	1-2f	29.68	5
2nd	Polos Fancy		33-1	30.30	2
3rd	Badge of Shamrock		9-1	31.02	3
4th	Artisan Bid	Len Drewery	7-1	00.00	6
5th	Nans Princess		5-1	00.00	1
N/R	Bell of Penzance				

Scurry Gold Cup, Clapton (Jul 28, 400y £1,000)
Pos	Name of Greyhound	Trainer	SP	Time	Trap
1st	Hi Darkie	Ray Wilkes	6-4f	22.95	1
2nd	Hey There Merry	Hugo Spencer	10-3	23.13	3
3rd	All There		5-1	23.39	4
4th	Renmore McAll	Stan Martin	16-1	23.45	2
5th	Paddys Fairy		25-1	23.51	6
6th	Courtly Regent	Gordon Hodson	3-1	23.52	5

Laurels, Wimbledon (Aug 17, 500y, £1,000)
Pos	Name of Greyhound	Trainer	SP	Time	Trap
1st	Tuturama	Frank Sanderson	4-6f	27.83	1
2nd	Hey There Merry	Hugo Spencer	20-1	28.15	3
3rd	Moyne Rocket	Jack Harvey	6-1	28.55	4
4th	Alvas Prince	Stan Martin	100-6	28.61	5
5th	Prince Rory		33-1	28.62	2
6th	Dancing Point	Clare Orton	4-1	28.72	6

St Leger, Wembley (Sep 3, 700y, £1,000)
Pos	Name of Greyhound	Trainer	SP	Time	Trap
1st	Powerstown Prospect	Ronnie Melville	8-1	40.02	3
2nd	Master MacMurragh	Cyril Beaumont	4-5f	40.05	2
3rd	Loyal Blue		50-1	40.19	4
4th	Any Harm	Ronnie Melville	7-2	40.25	1
5th	Hack It About	Jack Harvey	11-4	40.28	5
6th	Alassio Bambino	Joe Pickering	66-1	40.36	6

Scottish Greyhound Derby, Carntyne (Sep 8, 525y, £750)
Pos	Name of Greyhound	Trainer	SP	Time	Trap
1st	Dromin Glory	John Bassett	4-1	29.09	3
2nd	Hey There Merry	Hugo Spencer	14-1	29.25	6
3rd	Laurdella Dancer	Bob Burls	10-1	29.41	4
4th	Greenane Toast	Bessie Lewis	1-1f	29.42	2
5th	Tall Boy Ollie		10-1	29.58	5
6th	Free Hand		4-1	29.74	1

Cesarewitch, West Ham (Oct 5, 600y, £1,000)
Pos	Name of Greyhound	Trainer	SP	Time	Trap
1st	Dromin Glory	John Bassett	11-10f	32.97+	6
2nd	Any Harm	Ronnie Melville	5-1	33.33	4
3rd	Kilcarbery Park	Bill Kelly	10-1	33.45	3
4th	Prairie Flash	Jack Harvey	7-2	33.69	5
5th	Master MacMurragh	Cyril Beaumont	11-4	33.73	2
6th	Knocagh Pride		10-1	33.85	1

+ Track record

== Totalisator returns ==
Extended content

The totalisator returns declared to the licensing authorities for the year 1962 for the London area.

Stadium	Turnover £
London (White City)	4,821,421
London (Harringay)	3,412,683
London (Walthamstow)	2,488,522
London (Wimbledon)	2,354,784
London (Clapton)	2,180,033
London (Wembley)	2,126,317

Stadium	Turnover £
London (Catford)	1,732,635
London (West Ham)	1,723,914
London (Wandsworth)	1,700,422
London (Park Royal)	1,344,642
London (Stamford Bridge)	1,320,316
London (Hendon)	1,196,655

Stadium	Turnover £
London (New Cross)	1,116,281
Romford	1,048,161
London (Hackney)	1,024,437
London (Charlton)	600,000
London (Dagenham)	588,425
