= 1961 UK & Ireland Greyhound Racing Year =

British greyhound racing year

The 1961 UK & Ireland Greyhound Racing Year was the 36th year of greyhound racing in the United Kingdom and the 35th year of greyhound racing in Ireland.

== Roll of honour ==
Major Winners
Award	Name of Winner
1961 English Greyhound Derby	Palms Printer
1961 Irish Greyhound Derby	Chieftain's Guest
1961 Scottish Greyhound Derby	Hey There Merry
1961 Welsh Greyhound Derby	Oregon Prince
Greyhound Trainer of the Year	Jack Harvey & Jimmy Jowett
Greyhound of the Year	Palms Printer & Clonalvy Pride

== Summary ==
The Betting and Gaming Act 1960 came into force on 1 January 1961. The effect was almost instantaneous with afternoon attendances collapsing. In an attempt to combat the decline, the National Greyhound Racing Society banned telephones at the track and did not allow results to be published before 9.00 pm. In addition they attempted delaying trap draws and enforced a copyright on the tote returns but the government legislation had effectively handed over the afternoon track trade to the bookmaker industry.

Bizarrely the government handed horse racing a levy (a deduction from bookmaker's turnover that would be paid back to the racecourses), under the Betting Levy Act 1961. The levy was given because of the losses that horse racing would incur with daytime bookmakers shops opening. Greyhound racing was not given a levy which came as a further blow to the industry. Knowle Stadium, Stanley Greyhound Stadium (Liverpool) and Woodhouse Lane Stadium all closed.

== Tracks ==
The opening meeting was held at Poole football stadium on 8 May. A track was also added around the County Ground, Taunton despite an initial betting licence refusal. The Sheffield Corporation took over Owlerton Stadium with a £185,000 offer and converted the three private clubs into public bars which helped boost attendance figures.

== Competitions ==
Long Story won the Gold Collar to make up for his unlucky exit in the previous years 1960 Irish Greyhound Derby; the black dog had switched kennels from Jim Syder Jr. to Phil Rees. Oregon Prince easily won the Welsh Greyhound Derby while Palms Printer won the Scurry Gold Cup for his new handler Greg Doyle who had replaced Paddy McEvoy at the Clapton Stadium kennels; the veteran greyhound Gorey Airways was denied a third successive Scurry Gold Cup title. Chantilly Lace won the TV Trophy and Clonalvy Pride finally broke his classic duck, the April 1958 whelp ran a great race at Wimbledon, defeating the field that included Palms Printer and Winter Bell. Within two weeks he had also picked up the St Leger at Wembley Greyhounds and also won the Olympic at Wandsworth.

During the Eclipse heats the track record at Lythalls Lane Stadium is broken three times, Faithful Charlie (the eventual competition winner) set a new record of 29.19 followed by Jim's Tour in 29.16 and finally SS Leader in 29.12.

== News ==
John Sutton was handed control of the family-run business at Catford Stadium, following the death of his father Frank Sutton. He would introduce the first Jackpot Pool, later to be copied by horse racing. After the closure of the Knowle track, trainer John Rowe (father of Bob Rowe) joined Oxford Stadium. Within a year he had taken up the position as Racing Manager at Leicester Stadium and his son Bob became Assistant Racing Manager to Charles Boulton at Wandsworth Stadium.

The Greyhound Racing Association introduced under track heating systems at Belle Vue Stadium, Harringay Stadium and White City following a successful trial in Scotland. Electric cables were sewn into the track by the tractor and a team of workers then placed the cables eight inches under the turf. They would prove to be useful until the advent of all sand tracks. Catford and Walthamstow Stadium would continue to use under track systems replacing electric cables with water pipes until the late 1980s.

Former Oxford, Sheffield, Nottingham and Park Royal trainer Frank Schock leaves for Australia and takes a minor open race hound with him called Which Chariot. The greyhound provides a major bloodline in the Australian breeding industry. Five times Derby winning trainer Leslie Reynolds died on 1 August.

== Ireland ==
The Bord na gCon continued the process of upgrading their tracks by installing totalisator systems into seven more tracks.

== Principal UK races ==
Grand National, White City (April 29 525y h, £500)
Pos	Name of Greyhound	Trainer	SP	Time	Trap
1st	Ballinatona Special	Stan Martin	6-4f	29.50	1
2nd	Rory's Special	Joe Pickering	3-1	29.56	6
3rd	Shannon Dasher	Jimmy Maw	10-1	29.80	3
4th	Dawn Dancer	Cyril Beaumont	3-1	29.81	4
5th	Prince Thomas		10-1	30.29	2
6th	Bruff Chariot	Jimmy Jowett	100-7	30.45	5

The Grand Prix Walthamstow (May 9, 500y, £600)
Pos	Name of Greyhound	Trainer	SP	Time	Trap
1st	Clonalvy Romance	Fred Taylor	9-2	28.57	3
2nd	Twinies Pet	Jimmy Jowett	100-8	28.73	4
3rd	Shootover	Dave Geggus	10-1	28.81	6
4th	Fitz's Star	Tom 'Paddy' Reilly	10-11f	29.05	5
5th	Ashmount Bronco	Barney O'Connor	8-1	29.08	2
6th	Drakes Honey	Reg 'String' Marsh	13-2	29.14	1

Gold Collar, Catford (May 20, 440y, £1,000)
Pos	Name of Greyhound	Trainer	SP	Time	Trap
1st	Long Story	Phil Rees Sr.	20-1	25.69	6
2nd	Skips Choice	Leslie Reynolds	1-1f	25.97	4
3rd	Spinning Coin II	Phil Rees Sr.	4-1	26.00	2
4th	Crazy Invitation	Bob Burls	11-4	26.16	1
5th	Flying Fox II	Jimmy Jowett	10-1	26.17	3
6th	Ashfield Miller	Jimmy Jowett	8-1	26.41	5

Welsh Derby, Arms Park (Jul 1, 525y £500)
Pos	Name of Greyhound	Trainer	SP	Time	Trap
1st	Oregon Prince	Phil Rees Sr.	2-5f	28.86	6
2nd	Galbally Airways	Dr Dennis O'Brien	10-1	29.58	5
3rd	Early Foot	Jimmy Jowett	4-1	29.70	1
4th	Clonmannon Fire		8-1	29.82	4
5th	Gallant Leader	Ronnie Mills	20-1	30.04	2
6th	Crazy Holiday	Bob Burls	16-1	30.68	3

Oaks, Harringay (Jul 3, 525y, £500)
Pos	Name of Greyhound	Trainer	SP	Time	Trap
1st	Ballinasloe Blondie	Jack Harvey	2-7f	29.58	1
2nd	Linda's Flier	Mrs.E.Eade	7-2	29.88	2
3rd	Wins Eye Duckie	Ivor Morse	10-1	29.92	4
4th	Black Rattler	Jack Harvey	33-1	30.04	3
5th	Morning Moonlight	Joe Pickering	50-1	30.44	6
N/R	About July	Wilf France			5

Scottish Greyhound Derby, Carntyne (Jul 3, 525y, £500)
Pos	Name of Greyhound	Trainer	SP	Time	Trap
1st	Hey There Merry	Hugo Spencer	12-1	29.11	5
2nd	Tutcher		7-1	29.13	6
3rd	Desert Rambler	Joe Booth	1-1f	29.19	3
4th	Ballinclogher Champion		3-1	29.35	2
5th	Prince of Honour		25-1	29.41	1
6th	Dainty Spark	Harry Ward	5-1	29.45	4

Scurry Gold Cup, Clapton (Jul 232, 400y £1,000)
Pos	Name of Greyhound	Trainer	SP	Time	Trap
1st	Palms Printer	Greg Doyle	10-11f	22.63	3
2nd	Jims Tour	Bob Burls	7-2	22.85	6
3rd	Shootover	Dave Geggus	7-1	23.03	1
4th	Irish Blood	Jimmy Jowett	5-1	23.33	5
5th	Crazy Holiday	Bob Burls	25-1	23.47	2
6th	Gorey Airways	Jimmy Jowett	10-1	23.55	4

Laurels, Wimbledon (Aug 18, 500y, £1,000)
Pos	Name of Greyhound	Trainer	SP	Time	Trap
1st	Clonalvy Pride	Jack Harvey	2-1jf	27.66+	5
2nd	Galbally Airways	Dr Dennis O'Brien	20-1	27.94	4
3rd	Golden Arrow II	Bob Burls	10-1	27.95	2
4th	Violets Duke	Barney O'Connor	2-1jf	28.09	1
5th	Palms Printer	Greg Doyle	3-1	28.23	3
6th	Winter Bell	Clare Orton	100-8	23.24	6

+Equalled Track Record

St Leger, Wembley (Sep 4, 700y, £1,000)
Pos	Name of Greyhound	Trainer	SP	Time	Trap
1st	Clonalvy Pride	Jack Harvey	4-7f	39.64	1
2nd	Desert Rambler	Joe Booth	3-1	39.76	6
3rd	Old Berry Silver	Jack Toseland	10-1	40.16	2
4th	Chubbys Choice	Ted Brennan	6-1	40.32	4
5th	Avis	Jimmy Rimmer	50-1	40.36	5
6th	Utellme	Clare Orton	50-1	40.40	3

Cesarewitch, West Ham (Oct 6, 600y, £1,000)
Pos	Name of Greyhound	Trainer	SP	Time	Trap
1st	Prairie Flash	Jack Harvey	9-4	32.91	2
2nd	Nans Land		3-1	33.09	6
3rd	Desert Rambler	Joe Booth	11-8f	33.25	1
4th	Cross Word	Arthur Hancock	20-1	33.37	5
5th	Laird O'The Glen	Ken Moody	6-1	33.59	4
6th	Raymond Gift	Tony Dennis	20-1	33.77	3
