= 1967 English Greyhound Derby =

Sporting event

- Location: White City Stadium
- Start date: 10 June
- End date: 24 June
- Total prize money: £6,750 (winner)

The 1967 Greyhound Derby took place during June with the final being held on 24 June 1967 at White City Stadium. The winner was Tric Trac and the winning owner Nat Pinson received £6,750.

== Final result ==
At White City (over 525 yards):

Position	Name of Greyhound	Breeding	Trap	SP	Time	Trainer
1st	Tric Trac	Crazy Parachute - Supreme Witch	1	9-2	29.00	Ronald 'Jim' Hookway (Owlerton)
2nd	Spectre II	Crazy Parachute - Supreme Witch	6	2-1f	29.08	Ronald 'Jim' Hookway (Owlerton)
3rd	Mels Talent	Buffalo Bill - Nice Talent	2	6-1	29.46	Paddy Keane (Clapton)
4th	Shady Parachute	Crazy Parachute - Shady Contempara	3	9-2	29.56	Phil Rees Sr. (Wimbledon)
5th	Silver Hope	Clonalvy Pride - Millie Hawthorn	5	5-2	29.94	Paddy Keane (Clapton)
6th	Ambiguous	Crazy Parachute - The Mistress	4	100-8	30.34	Paddy McEvoy (Wimbledon)

=== Distances ===
1, 4¾, 1¼, 4¾, 5 (lengths)
The distances between the greyhounds are in finishing order and shown in lengths. From 1950 one length was equal to 0.08 of one second.

== Competition Report ==
Spectre II was the ante-post favourite leading into the 1967 Derby and his owner Nat Pinson refused a £5,000 offer for the greyhound before the competition started. Pinson also owned Tric-Trac and put the pair with Owlerton trainer Jim Hookway. Other leading entries included Irish greyhound 'The Grand Silver' trained by Paddy Dunphy and Silver Hope one of a strong team of four for Clapton trainer Paddy Keane.

Neither Tric-Trac or Spectre II won their first round heats but all of the main contenders safely progressed to the second round with the exception of Monalee Champion who had been the ante post favourite at 10–1, back in January when the first lists had been compiled. Irish interest ended in the second round and despite a troublesome race both Spectre II and Silver Hope survived the same heat to progress. Both were drawn together again in the semi-finals.

After taking a bump in the first semi-final Tric-Trac ran on well to claim third behind Mels Talent, Ambiguous another son of Crazy Parachute qualified in second place. The second semi-final was a repeat of the first with crowding affecting the race, Shady Parachute a daughter of Crazy Parachute won it with the pair of Silver Hope and Spectre II qualifying second and third respectively.

The final had four siblings, two full brothers, one half-brother and one half-sister, as well as two Hookway trained and two Keane trained runners. The Hookway pair had suffered problems after the semis with Tric-Trac having a split web and Spectre II suffering with a minor muscle strain, the injury with Spectre II was a concern because he had been pulled out of the Gold Collar with the same injury. However, by the day of the final both were reported fit and well. During the final both Mels Talent and Shady Parachute swung wide baulking Silver Hope and Ambiguous and forcing Spectre II wider. Tric-Trac missed the trouble by slipping through on the rails followed by Mels Talent and Spectre II. Tric-Trac held on to the win from his fast finishing brother Spectre II in a time of 29.00 sec.

== See also ==
- 1967 UK & Ireland Greyhound Racing Year
