= Barrow Park Road Stadium =

Sports venue in Barrow-in-Furness, England

- Location: Park Road, Barrow-in-Furness
- Coordinates: 54°09′12″N 3°13′14″W
- Opened: 1977
- Closed: 1993

Barrow Park Road Stadium was a greyhound racing and speedway stadium in Park Road, Barrow-in-Furness.

== Opening ==
Local businessman a plant hire operator Cliff Hindle built a new stadium at Park Road, which opened halfway through the 1977 season for a short series of speedway open meetings. In 1978 a team was entered under the name Furness Flyers, but finished bottom of the National League. Crowds were poor and the speedway track closed after only one season.

== Speedway ==
The nomadic Berwick Bandits who had been evicted from their home track at Shielfield Park by their landlords Berwick Rangers FC halfway through the 1981 season raced a number of meetings at Park Road, one of these was an Inter League cup match against the Wimbledon Dons speedway team.

Speedway racing returned in 1984 when former Barrow rider and local businessman Chris Roynon ran a series of 'Open Licence' meetings with a view to return to league racing in 1985. Barrow 'Blackhawks' entered the National League in April with the first meeting against Exeter Falcons being abandoned because of a generator failure. The British Speedway Promoters Association warned Roynon that his team would be expelled from the league if they didn't meet the minimum points limit required for team building. The team were subsequently expelled and their results expunged from the league table. Roynon reverted to running a number of 'open licence' meetings once again with a view to returning to league racing in 1986 but the events were not well attended, with the final speedway meeting taking place during September 1985.

== Greyhound racing ==
Independent (unaffiliated to a governing body) greyhound racing took place at the Park Road Stadium from 24 April 1987 until March 1991. The owner was Chris Roynon and racing was held every Tuesday and Friday. The hare system was an 'Inside Sumner' and the race distances were 250, 415 and 595 metres. There was car parking for 500 vehicles, a bar and mobile snack bar.

== Closure ==
In 1993 the stadium was demolished to make way for a candle factory.
