= Gosforth Greyhound Stadium =

Closed greyhound and rugby union venue in England

Northumberland County Ground
- Interactive map of Northumberland County Ground
- Former names: Gosforth Greyhound Stadium
- Location: Gosforth, Tyne And Wear
- Coordinates: 55°00′47″N 1°37′09″W
- Capacity: 18,000
- Surface: peat
- Field size: 456 yards

Construction
- Opened: 1932
- Demolished: 1988

Tenant
- Northumberland Rugby Union

Northumberland County Ground or the Gosforth Greyhound Stadium was a rugby stadium and greyhound racing stadium in Gosforth, Tyne And Wear.

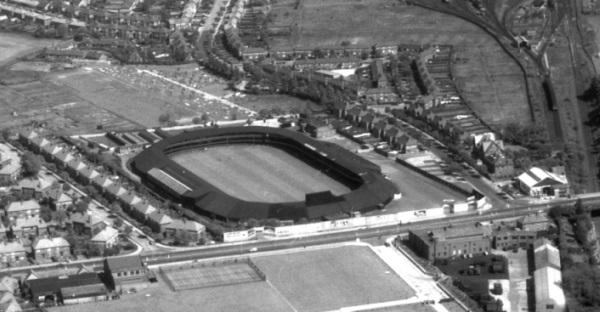
Northumberland County Rugby and Greyhounds Ground, 1965

== Origins ==
The urban district of Gosforth hosted greyhound racing from 1932 following the revamping of the existing County Athletic Ground. The athletic ground had been in use since 1900 as the Gosforth Cycling Grounds but when greyhound racing plans were passed it underwent major re-construction. The Northumberland Rugby Football Union took out a 15-year lease on the Gosforth Cycling Tracks at a cost of £80 per annum in 1912 (the County finally purchased the ground in 1923).It was situated south of Harewood Road and north of Hollywood Avenue but could be accessed from the Great North Road or Hollywood Avenue, and at the time had a fraction of the housing that exists in the area today.

== Opening ==
The opening night for greyhound racing was on 21 May 1932 thus becoming the third major track in Newcastle area at the time. It was licensed at different times by both the National Greyhound Racing Club (NGRC) and the short lived British Greyhound Tracks Control Society (BGTCS). The circumference of the track was 456 yards with initial distances of 420 and 520 yards.

Covered stands surrounded the entire track culminating with two major stands on the home and back straights. The north stand on the back straight included a club enclosure downstairs. The Sports Club was situated between the third and fourth bends and the Stadium Club could be found on the opposite side of the track. A large paddock and resident kennels were set back behind the Stadium Club with further isolation kennels and paddocks not far from the second bend area. The racing kennels were near the first bend next to the Northumberland Rugby Union Pavilion, the latter served as the dressing rooms and offices for the Northumberland RFU that used the centre green as their pitch. Gosforth RFC played home games at the stadium before moving to their own ground at North Road in 1955.

== History ==
The Gosforth Stadium Greyhound Racing Company Ltd established the track being just behind Brough Park in terms of totalisator turnover and attendances.

Following the closure of White City Stadium in Newcastle in 1951 the Racing Manager Mr Greggs joined Gosforth before Mr Martin became Racing Manager succeeded by Mr Slater in 1959. Just like White City the majority of the greyhounds were owned by the company and trained by the resident trainers resulting in very little open race action. Racing took place on Monday and Friday evenings at 7.30pm on a peat surface with an 'Inside Sumner' hare system. In 1959 a grader called Wine Steward (a June 1950 whelp) was retired after competing in 508 races and 118 wins.

During the 1960s the track was acquired by the Totalisators and Greyhound Holdings (T.G.H) who were actively purchasing tracks at the time to increase their portfolio. In 1966 rival track Gateshead closed and in 1974 TGH was bought out by Ladbrokes who persuaded Arthur Aldridge to leave the Greyhound Racing Association (GRA) and take over as racing director. In 1977 a graded greyhound called Gorton Road won her 100th race. One year later in 1978, Paul Richardson took over as Racing Manager at Brough Park and Gosforth.

== Rugby ==
Rugby arrived on the ground in 1912. The Northumberland Rugby Football Union had taken a 15-year lease on the Gosforth Cycling Tracks at a cost of £80 per annum in 1912 (the County finally purchased the ground in 1923).Two clubs also played there; Northern FC until 1937, and Gosforth (Newcastle Falcons), until 1955. A brick rugby clubhouse was built in the 1930s to replace an earlier wooden structure at the South West side of the stadium.

== Speedway ==
The stadium ran speedway for two years in 1929 and 1930, the latter hosting the Newcastle speedway team.

== Closure ==
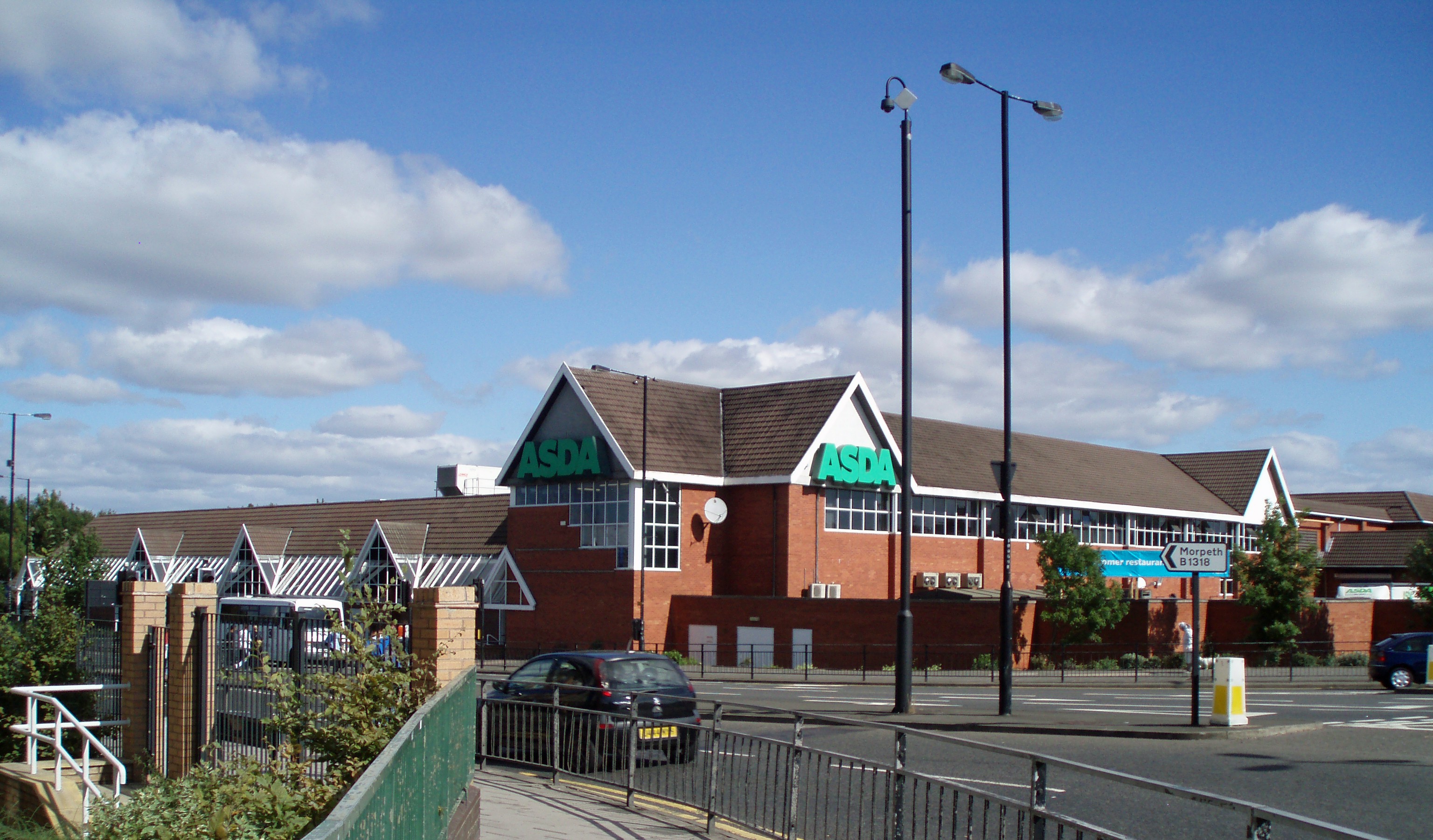
Asda Gosforth was later built on the site of the stadium

Ladbrokes began to sell off the tracks in their portfolio and with the sale of Brough Park in 1983 the new promoters of Brough Park stopped their trainers from supplying runners to Gosforth, leaving the track under pressure for a supply of runners. The track's promoter Jim Glass made the decision in 1985 to leave the NGRC and race independently blaming NGRC costs as the reason. It was the beginning of the end for Gosforth before the stadium was finally sold for re-development in 1987. The last meeting was held on 7 August 1987 and today the site is occupied by an Asda superstore.

== Track records ==
Distance yards	Greyhound	Time	Date	Notes
300	Parkroe Sport	16.94	27 June 1964	
475	Carefree Rambler	27.82	22 May 1948	
520	Traders Token	30.04	1947	
520	Jersey Belle	29.95	8 May 1948	
520	Fitz's Oliver	29.78	5 July 1965	
520	Hack Up Georgie	29.59	1970	
520	Lights of Old Head	29.60	23 July 1960	handicap
520	Hack Up Georgie	29.64	1970	
666	Shady Wonder	39.13	1970	
666	Always Lucky	39.17	26 September 1960	handicap
736	Shady Steam	43.58	1970	
736	The Humbug	43.30	1970	handicap
936	Seven Bells	58.40	1970	
