= Newcastle Stadium =

Greyhound racing venue in England

Coordinates: 54.97787°N 1.56502°W

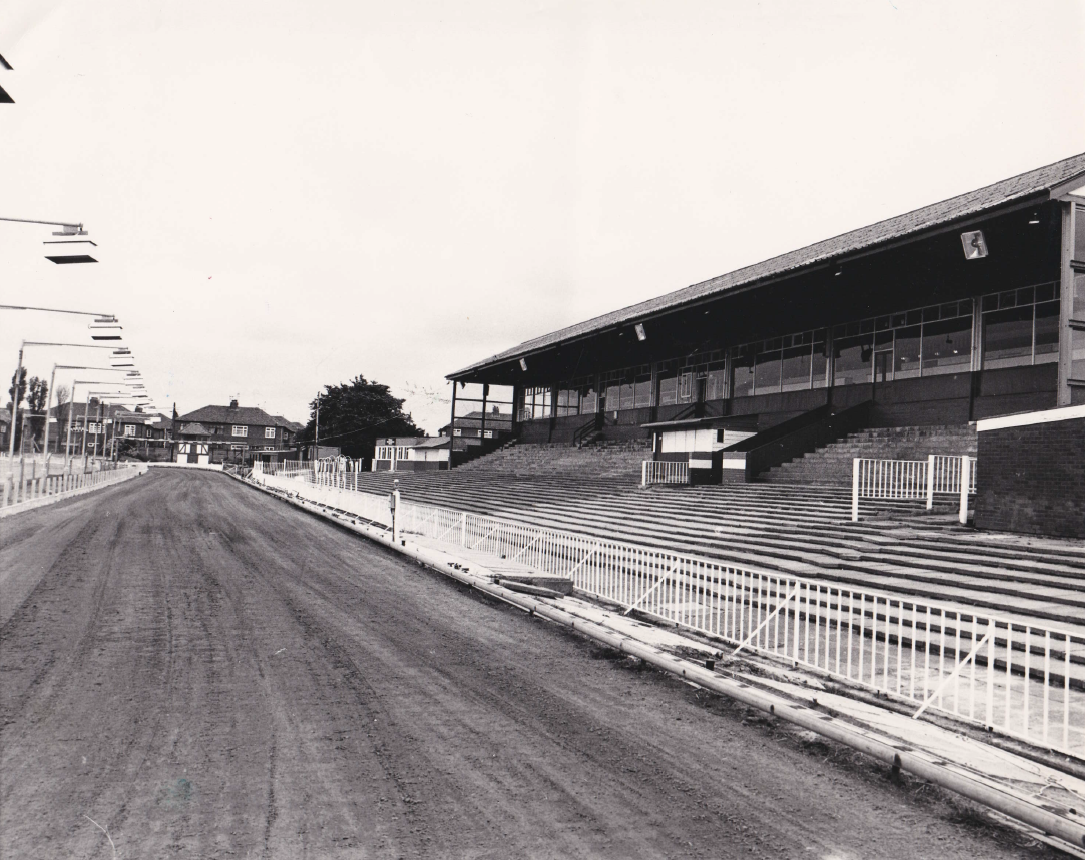
- Greyhound stadium circa.1970
- Interactive map of Newcastle Stadium
- Former names: Brough Park
- Location: The Fossway, Byker, Newcastle upon Tyne, Tyne And Wear
- Owner: Arena Racing Company
- Field size: 415m circumference

Construction
- Opened: 1928
- Renovated: 2003

Tenant
- Greyhound racing

Website
- Official website

Newcastle Stadium is a greyhound racing and former motorcycle speedway stadium, located on The Fossway, Byker, Newcastle. Racing at the stadium takes place on Tuesdays, Wednesdays, Thursdays and Saturdays. The circumference of the greyhound track is 415 metres. From 1929 until mid-2022, speedway racing took place at the stadium.

The stadium used to be known as Brough Park until it changed its name to Newcastle Stadium and is now owned by the Arena Racing Company.

== Greyhound racing ==
=== Competitions ===
- Northern Flat
- All England Cup
- Northern Puppy Derby

=== Origins and opening ===
In 1927 an area of land in Byker was selected for a new greyhound stadium. The site had previously been a racecourse for trotting, that had been laid out 1899 and a football team called Newcastle City had played on the site from 1912 to 1914. The stadium plot had previously contained garden allotments and the north section of the football ground. The stadium was constructed just south of the Fossway, east of Tunstall Avenue and west of the large garden allotments that ran alongside Roman Way. The transfer of the lease to the Greyhound Racing Association was arranged in June 1927.

The resident kennels were constructed right next to the Fossway and sat directly on the route of Hadrian's Wall. The kennels were very large and accommodated the greyhounds that would supply both Brough Park and Gosforth in later years. On the south side of these kennels was the tracks third and fourth bends. The stadium had a main stand on the home straight with licensed club facilities and a smaller stand on the back straight, also with licensed club facilities. In addition to the stands there were several tote buildings located on the home straight and between bends three and four next to the tote indicator and coffee bar.

Brough Park became the second greyhound stadium in Newcastle because the Tyneside Sports Stadium Ltd opened a track to the south of Scotswood Bridge called the White City Stadium just 28 days previous. The opening night was on 23 June 1928 with the first ever race being won by a greyhound called Marvin at odds of 3-1.

=== 20th-century history ===
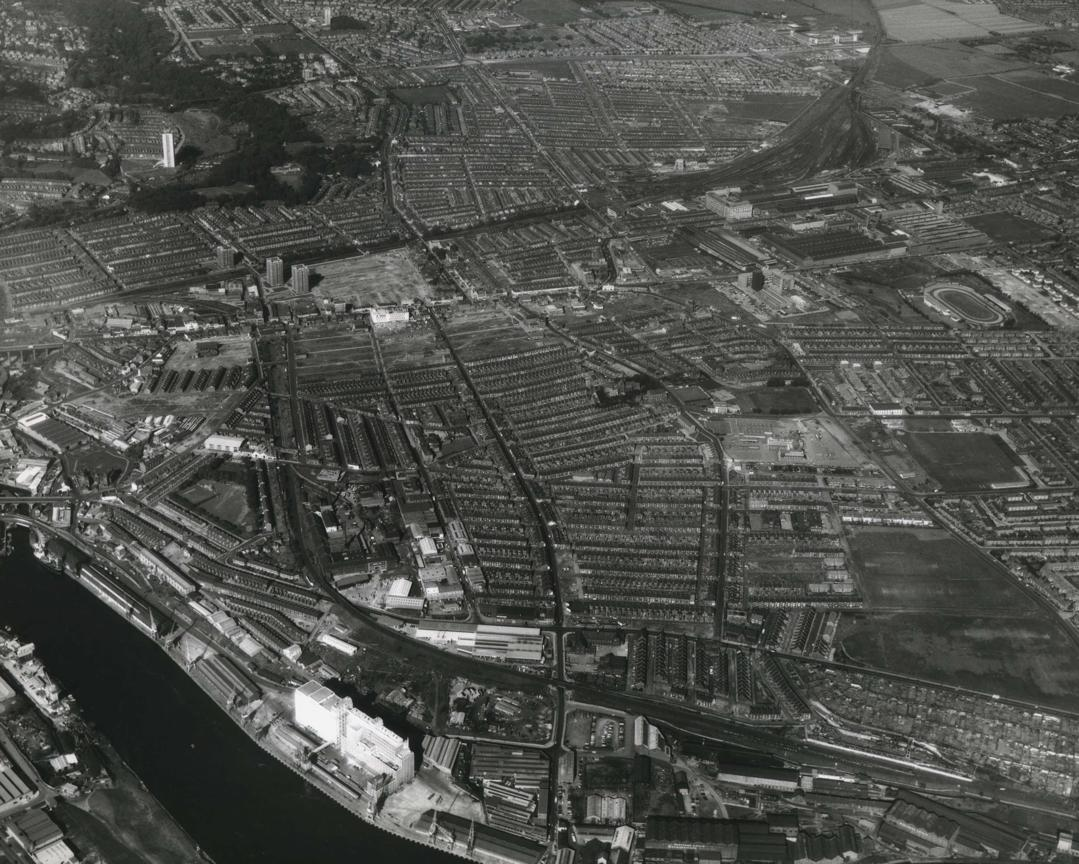
Aerial view of Byker and the stadium

In 1938 the All England Cup was introduced and the significant prize money attracted many of the top greyhounds from London and the south. The competition worth £1,100, replaced the Northumberland Stakes as the primary event at the stadium. As with many tracks the war soon interrupted the regular racing.

The surface was described as a good grass track, 430 yards in circumference with distances of 295, 500 & 520 yards with an inside Sledge-Trackless hare. The 500 yard distance had recently replaced 480 yards and a rarely seen centre green hare controller was in operation (the vast majority of tracks drove the hare from a home straight position). Two more competitions called the Northumberland Stakes and Northumberland Cup were introduced.

In 1946 Brough Park experienced the unique situation where during the 1946 running of the All England Cup all four national Derby champions competed. The English Greyhound Derby champion Mondays News, Irish Greyhound Derby winner Lilac Luck, Scottish Greyhound Derby winner Lattin Pearl and Welsh Greyhound Derby champion Negro's Lad all lined up for the event. The hope that all four would progress to the final failed to materialise but Mondays News and Lattin Pearl did finish first and second in the final.

During the fifties the Racing Manager was Mr Greeves and he officiated during the period when greyhounds such as Endless Gossip and Just Fame claimed victory in the All England Cup. As the sixties arrived the track underwent considerable changes including new ownership and management. In 1964 the Totalisators and Greyhound Holdings (TGH) became owners of stadium followed by a new general manager in Dan McCormick and Racing Manager Mr R Slater. The hare was switched to an outside Navan type with racing held on Thursday and Saturday evenings. Distances were 525, 650, 700, 750 and 880 yards including hurdles over 525 yards.

In 1967 Norman Oliver secured the 1967 Scottish Greyhound Derby with Hi Ho Silver. This started a great run of form for the kennels as Shady Begonia reached the 1968 English Greyhound Derby final one year later as well as securing the Television trophy title. In 1969 Shady Begonia won the Regency. In 1971 Ramdeen Stuart (trained by Oliver) won the classic races the St Leger and Gold Collar; other successes were the Stewards Cup, Ben Truman Stakes and Scottish St Leger.

Trainer Bill Raggatt steered Cute Caddie to a Stow Marathon victory in 1973 and Norman Oliver was voted Greyhound Trainer of the Year in 1973 but Patricias Hope stopped Ramdeen Stuart from taking Greyhound of the Year.

1974 brought about new owners to Brough Park as the TGH which included Crayford & Bexleyheath, Gosforth and Leeds was taken over by Ladbrokes. New joint Racing Managers were Tony Smith and Paul Richardson and the new director of racing for Ladbrokes was Arthur Aldridge. The stadium underwent improvements with a new restaurant. Three years later in 1977 a new competition was inaugurated and was called the Trainers Championship, this involved a series races with greyhounds from the top six trainers in the country. Brough Park was chosen as the very first venue that saw a tie between Natalie Savva and Geoff De Mulder.

In 1980 the track changed from grass to sand and Bill Hughes became Racing Manager. The future became uncertain when Ladbrokes decide to sell the track in 1983 to Glassedin Greyhounds Ltd; the company was headed by James Glass father of trainer Jane Glass. The kennels were sold for redevelopment into the Brough Park trading estate and soon after in 1984 the track changed hands from Glassedin Greyhounds Ltd to Bernard and Jean Neesham. Just two years later Kevin Wilde headed a management team that leased the track and then he bought the track from the Neeshams in September 1986. The legendary Scurlogue Champ won the 1986 Television Trophy at the track. Jubilee Rebecca won the 1994 Television Trophy for trainer Gordon Rooks.

=== 21st-century history ===
A major milestone and turning point for the track arrived in 2003. William Hill bookmakers purchased the track which then underwent major investment similar to that of Sunderland Greyhound Stadium whom William Hill had acquired the year before. A rebranding took place in 2007 and because the track was the only one left in Newcastle the decision was made to rename the stadium from Brough Park to Newcastle. The investment in the new facilities and track was rewarded with selection as the host of the Television Trophy in 2009 and Newcastle under Operations Manager Ian Walton and Racing Manager Paul Twinn have seen the standard of greyhounds become one of the best in the country.

Jimmy Wright scored a double success in 2010 when Target Classic picked up the William Hill Classic and England Expects lifted the William Hill Grand Prix on the same evening. Elwick Chris trained by Michael Walsh won the Laurels in 2010 and Droopys Hester won the Champion Stakes one year later. In 2012 Newcastle won the BAGS/SIS Track Championship.

In May 2017 the Arena Racing Company (ARC) acquired both Sunderland Greyhound Stadium and Newcastle Greyhound Stadium from William Hill. The stadium gained one of the sports most prestigious competitions the Laurels in 2017 from the GRA. There is now renewed hope that the competition may regain its category 1 status and increase its prize fund.

In 2017 Angela Harrison took over the trainer's licence and Newcastle contract from Jimmy Wright and in 2018 the stadium signed a deal with their parent company ARC to race every Wednesday lunchtime, Thursday evening and every Friday and Saturday afternoon.

Droopys Verve trained by Angela Harrison finished runner-up in the 2018 English Greyhound Derby and Droopys Expert reached the 2019 English Greyhound Derby final. Harrison also secured the 2019 British Trainers Championship at Sheffield.

In 2021, the stadium held the Northern Flat following the closure of Belle Vue Stadium.

In 2022, the stadium owners ARC signed a long term deal with Entain for media rights, starting in January 2024.

=== Track records ===
==== Current ====
Metres	Greyhound	Time	Date	Notes
290	Freedom Whiskey	16.60	14 July 2021	
480	Droopys Shearer	27.90	1 July 2004	
640	Cold As Ice	38.56	21 April 2021	
670	Shellam Delano	40.43	16 September 2017	
706	Shellam Delano	42.79	22 April 2017	
825	Greenacre Lin	50.44	13 July 2004	
895	Aayamzabella	55.81	8 October 2013	

==== Former (post-metric) ====
Extended content

Metres	Greyhound	Time	Date	Notes
277	Cooga Hall	16.92	23 November 1979	
290	Meadowbank Snooker	17.38	6 October 1983	
290	Hows Yer Man	17.22	2 March 1993	
290	Hollinwood Chief	16.86	12 September 2002	
290	Gateman	16.84	22 November 2003	
290	Final Trek	16.83	14 July 2007	
290	Target Brett	16.78	9 October 2010	
290	Walshes Hill	16.75	23 May 2015	
290	Walshes Hill	16.74	9 February 2016	
290	Ballymac Sexton	16.69	3 March 2018	
290	Deadly Act	16.63	1 June 2019	
460	Templemartin Una	28.00	11 October 1986	
460	New Level	27.81	12 May 1992	
480	Hack Up Georgie	29.59	29 June 1968	
480	Lisroe Mike	29.59	10 September 1976	
480	Just Right Melody	28.72	26 July 1994	
480	Barney the Bold	28.63	18 September 2001	All England Cup Final
480	Droopys Shearer	28.35	12 July 2003	
480	Internet Jo	28.31	9 August 2003	
500	Moneypoint Coal	30.08	12 October 1985	
500	Kilgrogan Tex	29.78	10 August 2002	
500	Tally Ho Shimmer	29.52	27 May 2004	
614	Shady Wonder	39.13	12 July 1968	
640	Stouke Tania	39.16	19 April 1994	
640	Calzaghe Frisby	38.61	19 September 2006	
670	Ballyregan Bob	41.15	8 May 1986	
670	Bellpac Tomas	40.83	6 September 2005	
670	Ballyheaphy Lass	40.74	20 September 2005	Northumberland Plate Final
670	Witton Maggie	40.74	20 September 2005	
670	Riverview Toby	40.69	19 September 2005	Northumberland Plate Final
670	Hurleys Hero	40.60	9 October 2010	
670	Banfid Rizzoli	40.49	20 September 2014	
680	Cahermore Ruby	43.24	1980	
825	Scurlogue Champ	52.62	11 June 1985	
825	Scurlogue Champ	52.26	23 April 1986	
825	Newry Town	52.02	10 May 1994	
825	Let Us Know	51.55	12 April 2001	
864	Seven Wells	58.40	3 June 1968	
895	Give Her Time	56.67	23 June 1998	
895	Flying Winner	55.93	12 November 2008	
480 H	Ballyhane Rio	30.20	14 November 2000	
480 H	Ballyhane Rio	30.18	9 December 2000	
480 H	Ballyhane Rio	30.10	18 September 2001	
500 H	Face The Mutt	31.43	1 July 1982	
500 H	Jenks Challenger	31.33	7 September 1991	
500 H	Kildare Slippy	31.06	22 February 1992	All England Champion Hurdle semi final

==== Former (pre-metric) ====
Extended content

Yards	Greyhound	Time	Date	Notes
300	Kenn Flyer	17.31	1950	
520	Ballyjoker	29.88	13 August 1938	All England Cup first round
520	Ballyjoker	29.86	17 August 1938	All England Cup second round
520	Ballyjoker	29.59	12 August 1939	All England Cup heats
520	Ballydancer	29.54	12 August 1939	All England Cup heats
520	Ballydancer	29.45	18 August 1939	All England Cup semi final
520	Endless Gossip	29.22	10 May 1952	All England Cup final
525	Cranog Bet	28.83	18 September 1964	Stewards' Cup final
525	Ramdeen Stuart	28.82	3 July 1972	
525 hc	Shady Fragrance	28.96	1970	
550	Witches Smoke	30.11	1970	
550 hc	Shady Begonia	29.92	1970	
650	Attorney General	39.02	1950	
650	Wallys Choice	37.56	16 November 1963	
700	Barr Na Scounch	39.90	15 September 1962	
700	Whiff	39.61	1970	
700 hc	Whiff	39.65	1970	
725	Pretty Oregon	41.32	1970	
725	Westpark Mustard	40.94	27 April 1974	13th win of the world record
750	Coologue Champion	43.28	28 September 1965	
750y	Canner	42.73	1970	
880	Chieftains Envoy	51.16	28 September 1965	
1000	Old Irish	59.61	1970+	
520 H	Farloe's Pride	31.24	1950+	
525 H	Harmless	29.87	1970+	
