= Phil Rees (greyhound trainer) =

British greyhound racing professional trainer

Phil Rees Sr.
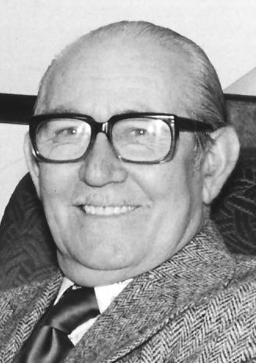

Personal information
- Born: 8 April 1914
- Died: 19 March 1986 (aged 71) Surrey, England
- Occupation: Greyhound trainer

Sport
- Sport: Greyhound racing

Achievements and titles
- National finals: Derby wins: English Derby (1976); Welsh Derby (1961); Classic/Feature wins: Laurels (1976); Oaks (1963, 1964, 1968); Scurry Gold Cup (1976); Gold Collar (1961)

Philip Richard Rees Sr. (8 April 1914 – 19 March 1986) was an English greyhound trainer. He was three times British champion trainer and a winner of the English Greyhound Derby.

== Biography ==
Rees worked as a Fleet Street rep, an advertising rep and a greengrocer before training greyhounds on the Welsh flapping tracks (independent tracks). He then became a kennel hand for Ernie Pratt, at Slough Stadium.

After taking out a private trainers licence, his first major success came in 1961, when a greyhound called Long Story won the Gold Collar. Just one month later the Derby final favourite Oregon Prince finished runner-up in the 1961 English Greyhound Derby. The greyhound made amends by then winning the Welsh Greyhound Derby.

On 8 July 1963, he won the Oaks for the first time with Cranog Bet but shortly afterwards gave notice to quit at Clapton Stadium, where he was a contracted trainer. He subsequently joined Wimbledon Stadium and repeated his Oaks success by winning the event with Cranog Bet again during 1964.

Shady Parachute qualified for the 1967 English Greyhound Derby final finishing fourth and one year later Rees had a second and fourth-place finish in the final. Shady Parachute was an overwhelming favourite but failed to secure the title, but did win the 1968 Oaks.

In 1976, Rees and Mutts Silver won the English Greyhound Derby.

In 1978, he retired and transferred the Burhill kennels in Walton-on-Thames to his son Philip Rees Jr. His grandson Richard Rees became a third generation trainer at the Burhill Kennels in 2008.

== Awards ==
He was a three times winner of the Greyhound Trainer of the Year in 1968, 1969 and 1976.
