= Puppy Classic =

English greyhound racing competition

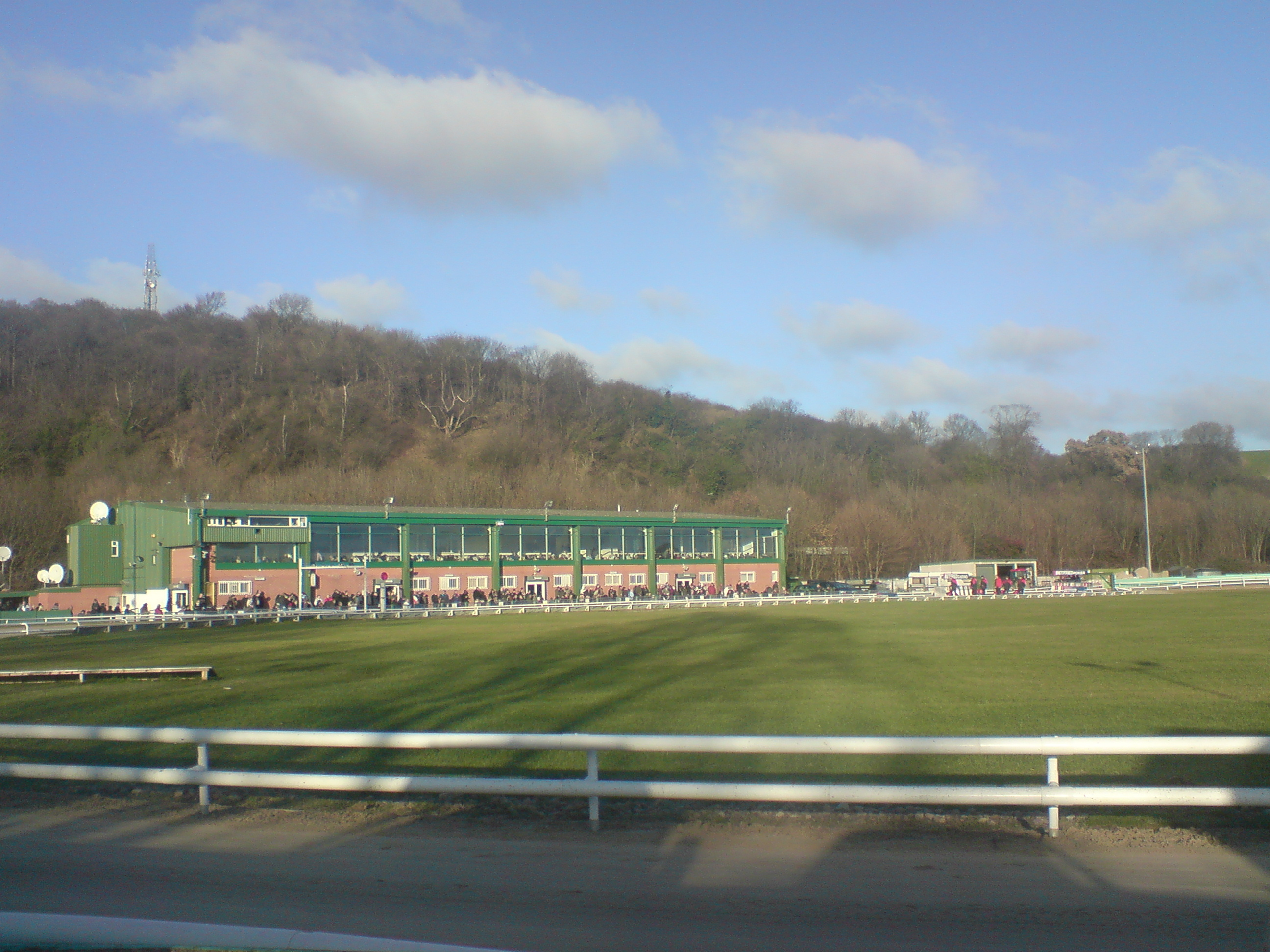
- Venue of the Puppy Classic
- Location: Nottingham Greyhound Stadium
- Inaugurated: 1995
- Sponsor: ARC

Race information
- Distance: 500 metres
- Surface: Sand
- Qualification: Puppies only (15-24 months old)
- Purse: £12,500 (winner)

The Puppy Classic is a greyhound racing competition held annually at Nottingham Greyhound Stadium.

It was inaugurated in 1995. The competition is only open to puppies, aged under two years of age. In 2022, new sponsors JenningsBet increased the winner's prize to £10,000.

== Venues and distances ==
- 1995–present (Nottingham 500m)

== Sponsors ==
- 1995–1999 (Coldseal)
- 2001–2005 (William Hill)
- 2006–2007 (Carling Brewery)
- 2008–2015 (Caffrey's Irish Ale)
- 2017–2018 (Greyhound Media Group)
- 2019–2019 (Stadium Bookmakers)
- 2021–2021 (ARC)
- 2022–2024 (JenningsBet)
- 2025–2025 (ARC)

== Past winners ==
Year	Winner	Breeding	Trainer	Time (sec)	SP	Notes/ref
1995	Elliots Gem	Castlelyons Gem – First Mission	Nickie Chambers (Nottingham)	30.09	7/1	
1996	Buchari	Ballyoughter Lad – Guess Twice	Tony Meek (Hall Green)	30.29	14/1	
1997	Jaspers Boy	Castlelyons Gem - Polnoon Lane	David Pruhs (Peterborough)	30.17	11/10f	
1998	Sarah Dee	Arrigle Buddy – Castlegannon Pop	Nick Savva (Milton Keynes)	30.58	4/5f	
1999	Kit Kat Kid	Some Picture – With A Vengeance	Charlie Lister (Private)	30.56	10/11f	
2000	Westmead Woofa	Toms The Best – Celtic Lady	Nick Savva (Private)	29.87	4/5f	Track record
2001	Top Savings	Top Honcho – Too Breezy	Gary Adam (Peterborough)	29.67	2/1	Track record
2002	Jurassic Jack	Lassa Java – Suirside Lass	Tony Meek (Hall Green)	30.24	7/4f	
2003	Droopys Shearer	Droopys Woods - High Knight	Ted Soppitt (Private)	29.47	2/9f	
2004	Ballymac Niloc	True Honcho – Ballymac Pepes	Carly Philpott (Coventry)	30.37	6/4f	
2005	Ronnies Champion	Top Honcho – Not So Dark	Mark Wallis (Walthamstow)	30.01	9/4	
2006	Fear Robben	Toms The Best – Westmead Wise	Mark Wallis (Walthamstow)	30.19	6/4f	
2007	Sibsey Showtime	Hotshot Ben – Locnamon Mist	Harry Crapper (Sheffield)	29.96	7/2	
2008	Farloe Merlin	Premier Fantasy – Farloe Oyster	Charlie Lister OBE (Private)	30.19	6/4f	
2009	Eye Onthe Storm	Droopys Vieri – Bower Louise	Mark Wallis (Harlow)	30.00	6/1	
2010	Droopys Oscar	Ace Hi Rumble – Droopys Bolero	Seamus Cahill (Hove)	30.18	1/1f	
2011	Farloe Iceman	Premier Fantasy – Farloe Reserve	Matt Dartnall (Swindon)	30.09	9/4	
2012	Ballymac Eske	Burnpark Champ – Ballymac Penske	Barrie Draper (Sheffield)	29.83	1/6f	
2013	Droopys Odell	Blackstone Gene – Droopys Quinta	Seamus Cahill (Hove)	29.68	6/4f	
2014	NewinnYolo	Crash – Little Flutter	Pat Rosney (Perry Barr)	29.71	5/4f	
2015	Crossfield Cesar	Ace Hi Rumble – Cooltraw Mist	Seamus Cahill (Hove)	29.87	9/4	
2016	Bubbly Bluebird	Droopys Sydney – Broadstrand Xola	Paul Young (Romford)	29.75	4/5f	
2017	Wildfire Lord	Tullymurry Act – Droopys Blossom	Paul Young (Romford)	29.66	12/1	
2018	Blue Trooper	Taylors Sky – Posh Pawn	Nigel Saunders (Belle Vue)	30.29	4/1	
2019	Ice on Fire	Crash – Bigmans Grainne	James Fenwick (Newcastle)	29.39	4/5f	
2020	Not held due to the COVID-19 pandemic					
2021	Bubbly Apache	Loughteen Blanco – Droopys Berry	Paul Young (Romford)	29.53	2/1	
2022	Distant Podge	Droopys Sydney – Distant Lucy	Barrie Draper (Sheffield)	30.09	5/6f	
2023	Glenvale Bill	Dorotas Wildcat – Droopys Kit	Graham Rankin (Monmore)	29.49	6/4f	
2024	March On Freddie	Dorotas Wildcat – Seaglass Shadow	David Mullins (Romford)	29.28	1/5f	
2025	Romeo Alliance	Romeo Magico – Fabulous Mila	Patrick Janssens (Towcester)	29.24	4/9f	
