= Juvenile (greyhounds) =

British greyhound racing competition

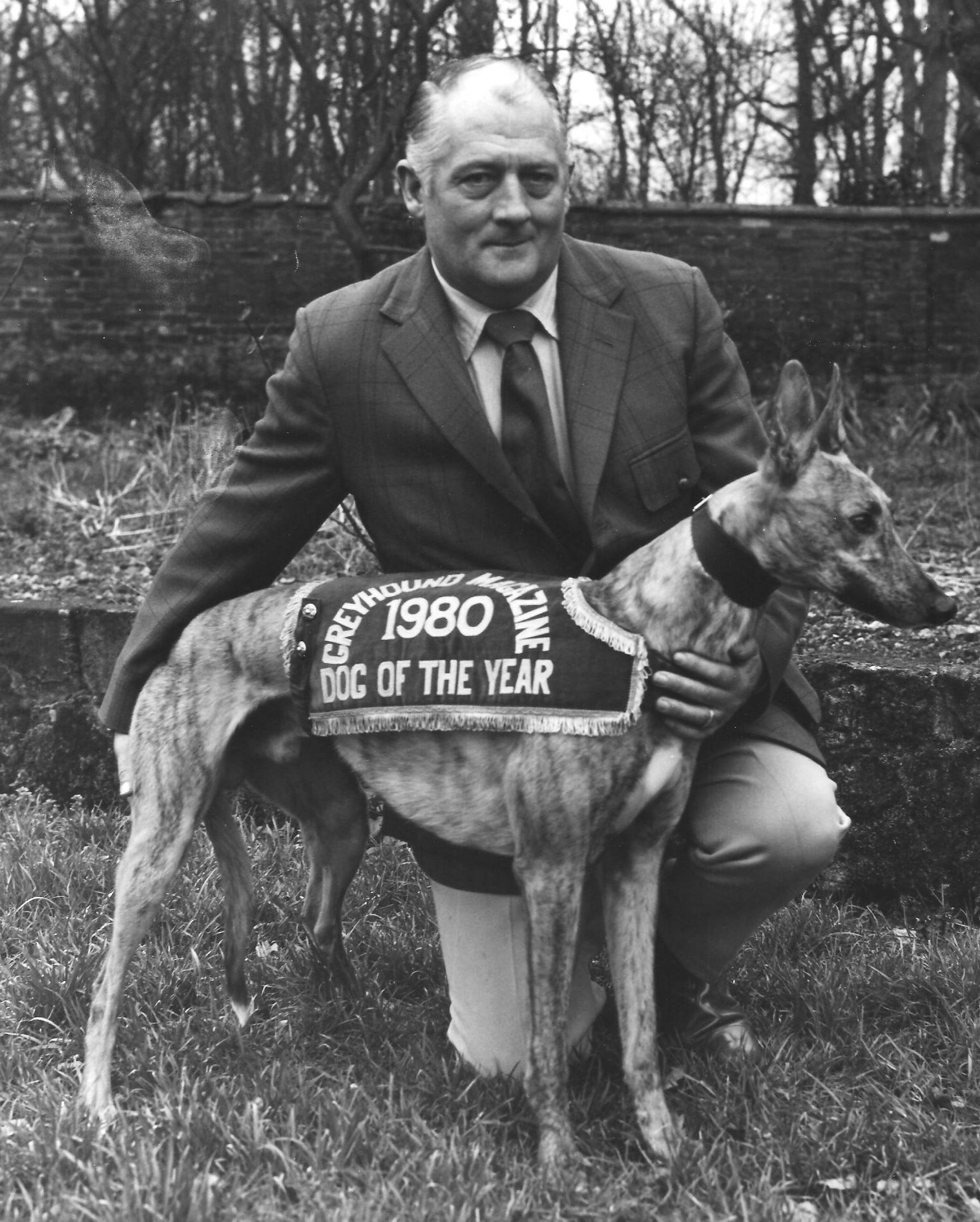
- 1979 champion Sport Promoter with trainer Pat Mullins
- Class: Category 2
- Location: Towcester Greyhound Stadium
- Inaugurated: 1957
- Sponsor: Time Greyhound Nutrition

Race information
- Distance: 500 metres
- Surface: Sand
- Qualification: Puppies only (15-24 months old)
- Purse: £10,000 (winner)

The Juvenile is a greyhound racing competition held annually at Towcester Greyhound Stadium.

== Sponsors ==
- 1957–1966 (Greyhound Express)
- 1978–1998 (Sporting Life)
- 1999–2023 (Racing Post)
- 2024–2025 (Time Greyhound Nutrition)

== Race history ==
It was inaugurated in 1957 at Wimbledon Stadium and was known as the Greyhound Express Merit Puppy Trophy but in 1964 it was renamed the Juvenile. The event is an invitation competition for the best six greyhounds who still have a puppy status.

In 2017 the race switched to Central Park Stadium in Sittingbourne following the closure of Wimbledon Stadium. The relocation of the competition to Central Park continued a family legacy for the Cearns family who had been connected with the race when it was first held in 1957.

From 2018 the competition was held at Owlerton Stadium before switching to Towcester Greyhound Stadium in 2021.

== Venues ==
- 1957–2011 (Wimbledon, 460m)
- 2012–2016 (Wimbledon, 480m)
- 2017–2017 (Central Park, 480m)
- 2018–2020 (Sheffield, 500m)
- 2021–present (Towcester, 500m)

== Past winners ==
Year	Winner	Breeding	Trainer	Time (sec)	SP	Notes/Ref
Greyhound Express Merit Puppy Trophy
1957	Beware Champ	The Grand Champion – Beware of Me	Paddy Fortune (Wimbledon)			
1958	Varra Black Nose	Glittering Look – Typhoon Jane	Dennis Hannafin (Wimbledon)			
1959	Armed Escort	Ballymac Ball – Little Expert	Ted Brennan (Owlerton)	28.69		
1960	Ballinasloe Molly	Northern Champion - Ballinasloe Baytown Crust	W Tabbush	29.14		
1961	Sally's Chat	Hi There – Sallys Gossip	Tony Dennis (Private)	28.50		
1962	Rocket Ranger	Solar Prince – Inlers Ena	Phil Rees Sr. (Wimbledon)	29.23		
1963	Pineapple Joe	Clopook - Sight Unseen	Dennis Hannafin (Wimbledon)	28.52	5/4f	
The Juvenile
1964	Hi Joe	Odd Venture - Hi Poole	Noreen Collin (Private)	28.65	4/7f	
1965	Morden Mist	Super Orange - Denver Hetty	Clare Orton (Wimbledon)	29.08	4/6f	
1966	Forward Flash	Crazy Parachute - Supreme Witch	Jack Brennan (Owlerton)	28.50	10/1	
1967	Fire Trap	Clonmannon Fire – Spring Trap	Paddy McEvoy (Wimbledon)	28.06	5/1	
1968	Mountleader Glen	Boro Parachute – Rose of York	John Horsfall (Catford)	28.53	100/7	
1969	Sovereign Mint	Maryville Hi – Cormackstown Beauty	Peter Collett (Private)	28.21	3/1	
1970	Dolores Rocket	Newdown Heather - Come On Dolores	Herbert White (Private)	28.24	7/2	
1971	Short Interview	The Grand Silver - Pride Of Corrin	Tom Johnston Jr. (Wembley)	27.98	10/1	
1972	Black Banjo	Monalee Champion - Brook Densel	Barney O'Connor (Walthamstow)	28.10	11/8f	
1973	Myrtown	Myross Again - Longstown Lassie	Eddie Moore (White City - Manchester)	28.11	5/4f	
1974	Head The Poll	Kilbeg Kuda – Zuider Zee	Phil Rees Sr. (Wimbledon)	28.56	7/1	
1975	Xmas Holiday	Supreme Fun - Mary's Snowball	Phil Rees Sr. (Wimbledon)	28.31	7/4f	
1976	Instant Gambler	Itsachampion - Sabrina	Dave Drinkwater (Bletchley)	28.98	9/4	
1977	Prince Hill	Own Pride - Dainty Beauty	Joe Kelly (Leeds)	28.20	8/1	
1978	Schofield Fish	Minnesota Miller – Funny Fish	Jack Coker (Oxford)	28.26	10/1	
1979	Sport Promoter	Breakaway Town - Kensington Queen	Pat Mullins (Cambridge)	27.70	8/11f	
1980	Upland Tiger	Free Speech - Bresheen	George Curtis (Hove)	27.48	1/2f	Track record
1981	Kris Is Back	All Wit – Faypoint Flyer	Tom Johnston Jr. (Wembley)	28.16	9/2	
1982	Mountkeefe Star	Nameless Star – Hi Land Peg	Geoff De Mulder (Coventry)	27.86	12/1	
1983	Westmead Milos	All Wit - Westmead Satin	Natalie Savva (Milton Keynes)	27.73	3/1	
1984	Hong Kong Mike	Knockrour Slave - Amalthea	Ray Andrews (Belle Vue)	27.80	6/4f	
1986	Fearless Action	Ron Hardy - Sarahs Bunny	Geoff De Mulder (Oxford)	27.64	8/11f	
1987	Spiral Darkie	Lindas Champion - Spiral Three	Gary Baggs (Ramsgate)	27.96	10/1	
1988	Wendys Dream	Tamarac - Up Town Girl	Tom Foster (Wimbledon)	27.77	4/5f	
1989	Bimbo Bird	Citizen Supreme - Active Bimbo	Sam Sykes (Wimbledon)	28.03	5/1	
1990	Druids Johno	Whisper Wishes - Hotsauce Mistake	Patsy Byrne (Canterbury)	28.10	6/4f	
1991	Slaneyside Hare	Skelligs Tiger - Slaneyside Queen	George Lightfoot (Norton Canes)	27.76	7/-4f	
1992	Right Move	Daleys Gold - Westmead Move	Nick Savva (Private)	27.66	7/2	
1993	Our Timmy	Aghadown Timmy - Neat Dish	Jim Barrett (Cradley Heath)	27.84	6/1	
1994	Ayr Flyer	Ardfert Sean - Slaneyside Glory	Dawn Wheatley (Nottingham)	27.63	2/7f	
1995	Bonmahon Darkie	Carmels Prince - Debs Tick	Terry Dartnall (Wimbledon)	27.66	11/10f	
1996	Droopys Aldo	Slippys Quest - The Other Point	Henry Tasker (Perry Barr)	28.35	9/4jf	
1997	Black Gem Charm	Slaneyside Hare - Perrys Charmer	Philip Rees Jr. (Wimbledon)	27.98	5/4f	
1998	Ground Zero	Slaneyside Hare – Glue Vixen	Geoff De Mulder (Milton Keynes)	27.95	3/1	
1999	I'm Okay	Cry Dalcash - Farloe Post	Barrie Draper (Sheffield)	27.79	5/4f	
2000	Knockanroe Rover	Mountleader Peer - Seanos Miss	Paul Stringer (Private)	27.84	3/1	
2001	Reactabond Rebel	Some Picture - Droopys Lorraine	Paul Young (Romford)	28.05	3/1	
2002	Top Savings	Top Honcho - Too Breezy	Garry Adam (Private)	27.56	4/5f	
2003	On Line Deal	Staplers Jo - Lady Ballydaniel	Paul Young (Romford)	28.21	3/1	
2004	Kinda Spooky	Top Honcho - Kinda Swell	Linda Jones (Walthamstow)	28.44	6/1	
2005	Toms View	Toms The Best - Deneview Pearl	Phil McComish (Nottingham)	27.81	4/6f	
2006	Droopys Lomasi	Knockeevan Major - Droopys Beauty	Stephen Dimmock (Milton Keynes)	28.00	25/1	
2007	Express Ego	Top Honcho - Airport Express	Owen McKenna (Ireland)	27.42	6/4f	
2008	Ballymac Under	Ballymac Maeve - Ballymac Lark	Matt Dartnall (Reading)	27.81	4/7f	
2009	Fear Zafonic	Premier Fantasy-Farloe Oyster	Charlie Lister (Private)	27.97	4/5f	
2010	Ten Large Down	Royal Impact - Honey Princess	Diane Henry (Private)	28.10	8/1	
2011	Blue Artisan	Droopys Maldini – Poolie Pride	Harry Williams (Sunderland)	28.59	6/1	
2012	Eden Star	Top Savings – Aranock Val	Barrie Draper (Sheffield]	28.59	6/4f	
2013	Ballymac Eske	Burnpark Champ – Ballymac Penske	Barrie Draper (Sheffield)	28.41	5/4f	
2014	Droopys Odell	Blackstone Gene - Droopys Quinta	Seamus Cahill (Hove)	28.84	6/1	
2015	Ballymac Brogan	Ballymac Vic – Bawna Elsa	Seamus Cahill (Hove)	28.39	9/2	
2016	Ballymac Ramsey	Droopys Scolari – Ballymac Razl	Barrie Draper (Sheffield)	28.65	7/2	
2017	Murrys Act	Tullymurry Act – Brave Meave	Kevin Boon (Yarmouth)	28.99	12/1	
2018	Bull Run Button	Ballymac Eske – Tullowmac Java	Barrie Draper (Sheffield)	28.86	9/4	
2019	Seaglass Phantom	Droopys Jet – Beanfield Parke	Patrick Janssens (Central Park)	28.60	5/2	
2020	Ice on Fire	Crash – Bigmans Grainne	James Fenwick (Newcastle)	29.21	2/5f	
2021	Ballymac Trend	Ballymac Best – Motobar Abigail	Kevin Boon (Towcester)	29.62	7/1	
2022	Bubbly Apache	Loughteen Blanco – Droopys Berry	Paul Young (Romford)	29.63	4/6f	
2023	Arkady	Droopys Jet – Good Legacy	David Mullins (Romford)	29.50	7/1	
2024	Faypoint Harvey	Droopys Sydney – Roaming Shari	Graham Holland (Ireland)	29.21	11/8f	
2025	Proper Heiress	Droopys Sydney – Powerful Mush	Mark Wallis (Private)	28.62	10/3	
