= English Greyhound Derby Invitation =

English Greyhound Derby Invitation/Consolation
- Location: White City; Wimbledon; Towcester
- Inaugurated: 1936
- Sponsor: Various

Race information
- Distance: 500 metres (1,600 ft)
- Surface: Sand

The English Greyhound Derby Invitation formerly the Derby Consolation Stakes was a long standing competition for greyhounds eliminated during the later stages of the English Greyhound Derby.

It was originally for the six greyhounds eliminated at the semi-final stage but is now for greyhounds invited by the racecourse, although this still consists largely of the eliminated semi finalists.

It was run at White City Stadium from 1927 until 1984. Following the closure of White City the event was switched to Wimbledon Stadium in 1985 and then to Towcester Greyhound Stadium in 2017. Winners over the decades have included Quare Times, Dante II, Sole Aim, Lively Band and Toms The Best.

The race was discontinued following the closure of Towcester.

== Past winners ==
Year	Winner	Breeding	Trainer	Time	SP	Notes
1936	Melksham Keystone		Joe Harmon (Wimbledon)	29.46	11-4	
1937	Golden Alexander		Jimmy Campbell (White City)	29.49	3-1	
1938	Ballyhennessy Sandills	White Sandills – Soraca Deas	Sidney Orton (Wimbledon)	29.68	1-2f	
1939	Selsey Cutlet	Future Cutlet – Happy Freda	Leslie Reynolds (Wembley)	29.31	9-4f	
1945	Fair Brook	Lights Of Brooklyn – Rose Of Castledown	Stanley Biss (Clapton)	29.78	7-2	
1946	Quare Times	Bally Dancer – Quite Welcome	Sidney Orton (Wimbledon)	28.82	1-1f	Track Record
1947	Dante II	Well Squared – Olives Idol	Bob Burls (Wembley)	29.03	8-11f	
1949	Jimmies Cull	Glenview Shaggy – Fast Asleep	Ken Appleton (West Ham)	29.39	9-4	
1950	Behattans Choice	Bahs Choice - Behattan	Bob Burls (Wembley)	28.75	1-1f	
1951	Melampus	Mad Tanist – Whiterock Laura	Noreen Collin (Walthamstow)	28.90	5-1	
1952	Ruddy Climax	Bahs Choice – Pure Motive	Paddy McEvoy (Private)	29.05	5-2	
1953	Polonius	Mad Tanist – Calpurnia	Tom 'Paddy' Reilly (Walthamstow)	29.33	11-8f	
1954	Tolerton Ash	Astras Son – Black Nan	Tom Perry (Private)	29.06	4-1	
1955	Chance Me Paddy	Paddy The Champion – Verges Cottage	Robert Linney (Catford)	29.21	10-1	
1956	Cleos Gossip	Endless Gossip – Devoted Ever	Bob Burls (Wembley)	29.28	100-30	
1957	Northern King	Champion Prince – Big Bawn	Jack Harvey (Wembley)	29.06	5-4f	
1958	Beware Champ	The Grand Champion – Beware of Me	George Waterman (Wimbledon)	28.83	7-4f	
1959	Dunmore Rocco	Hi There – Dunmore Claudia	Dennis Hannafin (Wimbledon)	29.14	1-2f	
1960	Rostown Genius	The Grand Genius – Rostown Lady	Joe Pickering (White City)	29.15	9-4	
1961	Trojan Van	Whirling Turk – Sitting Pretty	Jimmy Rimmer (Clapton)	28.97	11-4	
1962	Tall Boy Ollie	Hi There - Ophelia	Tom Johnston Jr. (West Ham)	29.21	13-8	
1963	We’ll See	Knock Hill Chieftain - Bunnykins	Joe Pickering (White City)	29.22	4-1	
1964	Pineapple Joe	Clopook – Sight Unseen	Dennis Hannafin (Wimbledon)	28.94	8-1	
1965	Westpark Ash	Hi There – Westpark Ballet	Kevin O'Neill (Walthamstow)	28.99	6-4f	
1966	Dillies Pigalle	Pigalle Wonder – Millies Dillie	Ronnie Chandler (Ireland)	29.20	2-5f	
1967	Daybreak Again	Odd Venture – Dollys Toast	Geoff De Mulder (Leicester)	28.85	2-1	
1968	Super Kid	Congo Kid – Merry Hampton	Joe Pickering (White City)	29.01	7-1	
1969	Valiant Ray	Westpark Quail - Jamboree Judy	Kevin O'Neill (Walthamstow)	28.92	4-1	
1970	Sole Aim	Monalee Champion - Yurituni	David Geggus (Walthamstow)	28.88	5-1	
1971	Ballybeg Era	Mad Era – Ballybeg Pride	Vicky Holloway (Private)	28.86	12-1	
1972	Suburban Gent	Monalee Champion – Meadowbank Girl	J Horan (Ireland)	28.80	13-8	
1973	Shara Dee	Silver Hope – Flashy Minnie	Noreen Collin (White City)	28.88	7-4	
1974	Lively Band	Silver Hope – Kells Queen	Tom Johnston Jr. (Wembley)	28.59	5-4f	
1975	Shamrock Point	Monalee Champion – Gruelling Point	Ger McKenna (Ireland)	29.33	1-2f	
1976	Shamrock Point	Monalee Champion – Gruelling Point	Ger McKenna (Ireland)	29.33	4-5f	
1977	Linacre	Lively Band - Central	Ted Dickson (Slough)	29.36	10-11f	
1978	Malange	Broadford Boy – Paper Cracker	Matt O'Donnell (Ireland)	29.83	3-1	
1979	Jebb Rambler	Tullig Rambler – Thats The Style	Harry Crapper (Owlerton)	29.26	10-11f	
1980	Dodford Bill	Instant Gambler – Ballyregan Maid	Dave Drinkwater (Bletchley)	29.33	5-4f	
1981	Greenane Metro	Greenane Decca – Pineapple Grand	Arthur Hitch (Private)	29.30	5-4f	
1982	Fearless Mover	Nameless Star – Ballydonnell Pat	Geoff De Mulder (Coventry)			
1983	Hay Maker Mack	Brave Bran – Excuse Me Madam	Derek Knight (Brighton)	28.95	4-5f	Track Record
1984	Nippy Law	Lax Law – Shems Fancy	Geoff De Mulder (Nottingham)	29.78	1-1f	
1985	One To Note	Lindas Champion – Hotel Queen	Norah McEllistrim (Wimbledon)	29.11	3-1	
1986	Lodge Prince	Sand Man – Cooga Customer	Gary Baggs (Ramsgate)	28.67	4-9f	
1987	Karens Champ	Round Robin - Carmaur	Gary Baggs (Walthamstow)	28.98	20-1	
1988	Mottos Count	Count Five – My Motto	Gary Baggs (Walthamstow)	28.74	14-1	
1989	Kildare Ash	Wise Band – Lindas Zest	John McGee Sr. (Canterbury)	28.84	6-4f	
1990	Demesne Chance	Kyle Jack – Anti Everything	Gunner Smith (Hove)	28.96	7-4f	
1991	Vics Snowdrop	Daleys Gold – White Ranger	Philip Rees Jr (Wimbledon)	28.66	8-1	
1992	Luxury Light	Daleys Gold – Calypso Music	John McGee Sr. (Reading)	28.83	4-1	
1993	Dromin Fox	Greenpark Fox – Sound of Wings	Paul Garland (Ramsgate)	28.87	5-1	
1994	Greenane Squire	Manorville Major – Endless Game	Tony Meek (Hall Green)	28.80	4-6f	
1995	Westmead Merlin	Murlens Slippy – Westmead Hannah	Nick Savva (Walthamstow)	28.67	4-9f	
1996	Quick Tune	Farloe Melody – Lady Be Fast	Gordon Hodson Hove	28.91	7-1	
1997	Toms The Best	Frightful Flash – Ladys Guest	Nick Savva (Walthamstow)	28.42	2-1jf	
1998	Droopys Eric	Kyle Jack – Droopys Fergie	Henry Tasker (Private)	29.17	5-1	
1999	Stouke Tim	Kildare Slippy – Stouke Pearl	Barrie Draper (Sheffield)	28.67	11-4	
2000	Rio Riccardo	Trade Official – Kylies Quest	Daniel Riordan (Private)	28.86	4-9f	
2001	Carhumore Cross	He Knows – Laurdella Risk	Nick Savva (Private)	29.03	8-1	
2002	Droopys Corleone	Top Honcho – Droopys Kylie	Daniel Riordan (Private)	29.08	1-1f	
2003	Farloe Style	Staplers Jo – Farloe Dingle	Seamus Cahill (Wimbledon)	28.64	9-4	
2004	Droopys Cahill	Top Honcho – Droopys Kristin	Ian Reilly (Ireland)	28.64	5-4f	
2005	January Tiger	Droopys Vieri – January Vixen	Mark Wallis (Walthamstow)	28.78	9-4	
2006	Blue Majestic	Top Honcho – Marinas Tina	Seamus Graham (Ireland)	28.81	4-1	
2007	Zigzag Dutchy	Dutchys Angel – Zigzag Bullet	Charlie Lister OBE (Private)	28.92	2-1f	
2008	Toosey Blue	Hondo Black – Black Diamond	John Mullins (Yarmouth)	28.89	7-4	
2009	Cabra Boss	Big Daddy Cool – Cabra Dancer	Liz McNair (Private)	28.86	6-4f	
2010	Head Iton Ellis	Hondo Black - Caressing	Steve Race (Private)	28.51	15-8	
2011	Boher Legend	Balintore Brave – Knock Princess	Charlie Lister OBE (Private)	28.46	9-4	
2012	Bubbly Phoenix	College Causeway – Droopys Top Gal	Paul Young (Romford)	28.22	7-4f	
2013	Holdem Spy	Hondo Black – Have One More	Carol Weatherall (Coventry)	28.33	6-4f	
2014	Aero Nemesis	Ja Mann – Shelbourne Capri	Mark Wallis (Yarmouth)	28.21	8-11f	
2015	Swift Keith	Vans Escalade – Swift Sandy	John Mullins (Yarmouth)	28.16	9-2	
2016	Southfield Jock	Droopys Scolari - Lady Anastasia	Seamus Cahill Hove	28.08	11-8f	
2017	Bruisers Bullet	Droopys Cain - Clover Bride	Mark Wallis (Towcester)	28.78	7-4f	
2018	Innocent Times	Tyrur Big Mike - Toms Delight	Brendan Matthews (Ireland)	29.02	11-4	

== Venues & Distances ==
- At White City from 1936 to 1974 (over 525 yards)
- At White City Stadium from 1975 to 1984 (over 500 metres)
- At Wimbledon from 1985 to 2016 (over 480 metres)
- At Towcester from 2017 to 2018 (over 500 metres)

== Sponsors ==
- 2005-2006 William Hill
- 2007-2008 Blue Square
- 2009-2016 William Hill
- 2017-2018 Star Sports
