= National Sprint (greyhounds) =

British greyhound racing competition

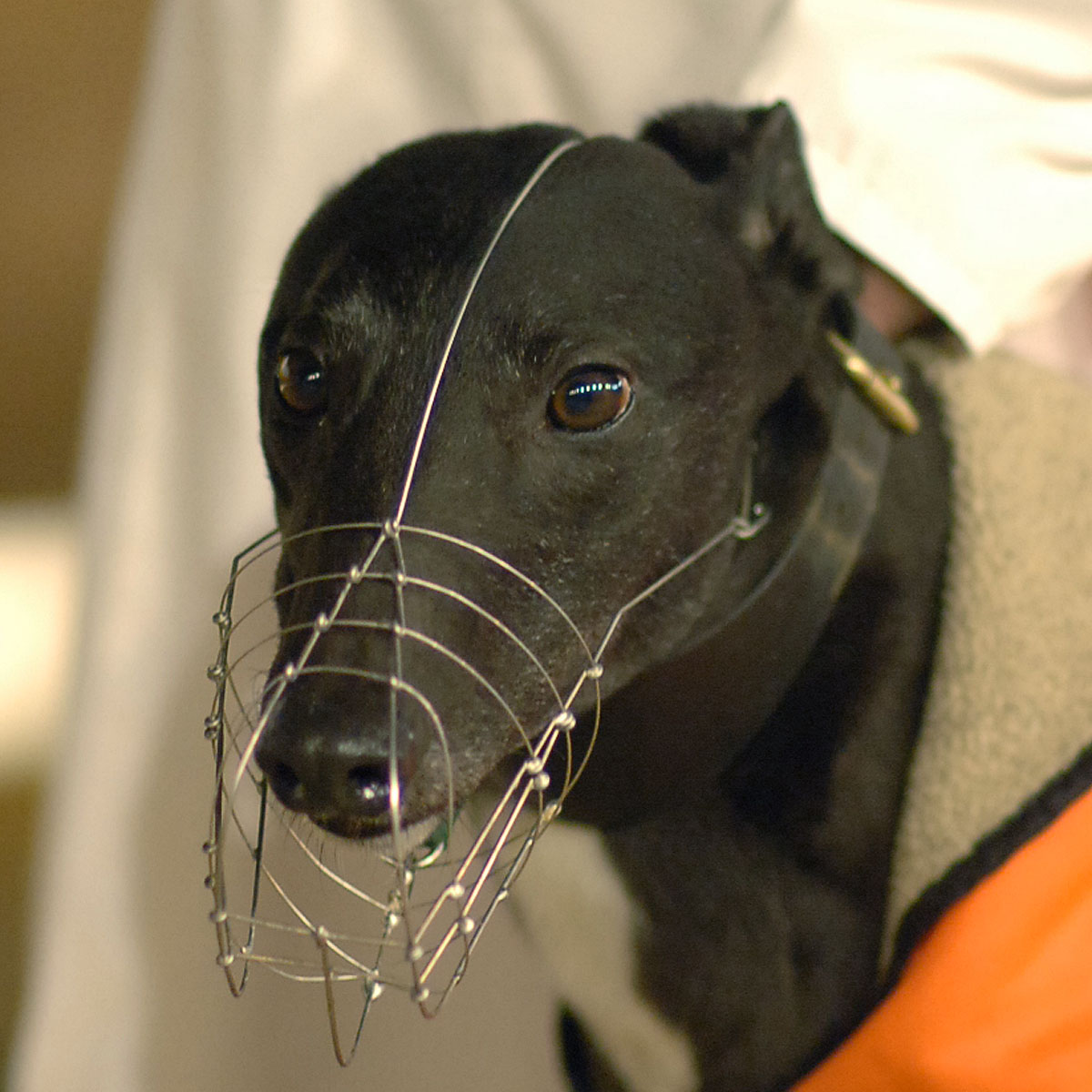
- 2004 winner Ningbo Jack
- Class: Category 2
- Location: Nottingham Greyhound Stadium
- Inaugurated: 1953
- Sponsor: Arena Racing Company

Race information
- Distance: 305 metres
- Surface: Sand
- Purse: £7,500 (winner)

The National Sprint is a greyhound racing competition held annually at Nottingham Greyhound Stadium.

== History ==
It was inaugurated in 1953 at Clapton Stadium. Following the closure of Clapton in 1974 the competition briefly switched to Portsmouth Stadium before it found a home at Harringay Stadium.

When Harringay closed down in 1987 the event was not held again until Nottingham decided to resurrect the competition in 1990, although it was initially known as the Christmas Cracker.

== Venues ==
- 1953–1973 (Clapton 400 yards)
- 1974–1976 (Portsmouth 435 metres)
- 1977–1984 (Harringay 414 metres)
- 1985–1987 (Harringay 272 metres)
- 1982, 1988–1989 (Not run)
- 1990–1998 (Nottingham 310 metres)
- 1999–2002 (Nottingham 300 metres)
- 2003–2004 (Nottingham 295 metres)
- 2005–present (Nottingham 305 metres)

== Sponsors ==
- 1994–2001 (Peter Derrick bookmakers)
- 2002–2003 (William Hill)
- 2005–2017 (Stadium Bookmakers)
- 2018–2019 (Local Parking Security Ltd)
- 2020–2020 (Racing Post GTV)
- 2021–present (Arena Racing Company)

== Past winners ==
Year	Winner	Breeding	Trainer	Time (sec)	SP	Notes/ref
1953	Rolling Mike	Mad Tanist – Brilliant Memory	Jimmy Jowett (Clapton)	23.05	13/8f	
1954	Demon King	Imperial Dancer – Pretty Waltzer	Jack Harvey (Wembley)	23.08	9/4	
1955	Glenriver		Jimmy Jowett (Clapton)	23.40	8/1	
1956	Toby Boy	Jeffs Pal – Mondays Flirt	Paddy Fortune (Wimbledon)	22.91	7/2	
1957	Land Of Song	Fire Prince – Old Blarney Gift	Bob Burls (Wembley)	22.88	9/2	
1958	Town Prince	Small Town – Orphan Princess	Leslie Reynolds (Wembley)	22.90	7/4f	
1959	Waterford Lough	Country Mile – Waterford Glass	Dennis Hannafin (Wimbledon)	22.94	7/1	
1960	Gorey Airways	Imperial Airways – Geffs Linnet	Jimmy Jowett (Clapton)	22.79	4/7f	
1961	Hey There Merry	Hi There – Merry Champion Again	Hugo Spencer (Portsmouth)	23.09		
1962	Orions Nearly Blue		John Bassett (Clapton)	22.60		
1963	Cranog Bet	Knock Hill Chieftain – Don’t Bet	Phil Rees Sr. (Clapton)	22.71		
1964	Bright Again	Newdown Heather – Monalee Tiny	Mrs J Reeve (Private)	23.03	5/1	
1965	Gallant They Say		Paddy Keane (Clapton)	22.84		
1967	Fionas Chance	Any Harm – Nicely Arranged	Barney O'Connor (Walthamstow)	22.71		
1968	Kattys Prairie	Prairie Flash – Judo Win	Bette Godwin (Clapton)	23.09	2/1f	
1969	Cheeky Boy	Sallys Yarn – Big Blarney	Noreen Collin (Private)	23.10	5/4f	
1970	Don't Gambol	Prairie Flash – One For Minnie	Paddy McEvoy (Wimbledon)	22.59		
1971	One Last Day			23.07		
1972	Hazelbury Silver	Cons Duke – Hazelbury Lass	Tom Johnston Jr. (Wembley)	22.77	7/4	
1973	Giglis Star	Lindas Champion – Giglis Waltz		22.91		
1974	Star Vega	Cobbler – Big Gamble	Mrs.J.Hawkins (Private)	26.71		
1975	Onitsown	Silver Hope – Noble Florrie	Hugo Spencer (Portsmouth)	27.31		
1976	Whats The Score		Hugo Spencer (Portsmouth)	27.56	14/1	
1977	Glezepta Work	Itsachampion – Fly Snowdrop	Ben Parsons (Hall Green)	24.88		
1978	Sampsons Pal	Blessington Boy – Salta IV	Pat Mullins (Private)	24.94		
1979	Knockrour Brandy	Bright Lad – Knockrour Last	Freda Greenacre (Private)	24.90		
1980	Knockrour Brandy	Bright Lad – Knockrour Last	Freda Greenacre (Private)	25.19		
1981	Ballybeg Sport	Minnesota Miller – Ballybeg Blonde	Vicky Holloway (Oxford)	24.60	2/5f	Track record
1983	Ballybeg Sport	Minnesota Miller – Ballybeg Blonde	Vicky Holloway (Oxford)	25.19		
1984	Floating Petal	Brilliant Chimes – Glenmoy Lily	(Harringay)	25.41		
1985	Daleys Gold	Lindas Champion – Ballinderry Moth	Jerry Fisher (Reading)	16.11		
1986	Paddock Speed	Onitsown – Paddock Post		16.39		
1987	Ard What	Ballygarvan What – Heres Eden		16.38		
1990	Wheres The Limo	Glenpark Dancer – Kingswell Joy	Linda Mullins (Romford)	18.50	5/1	
1991	No Jo Soap	Staplers Jo – Benroe Bessie	Nigel Saunders (Belle Vue)	18.70	11/2	
1992	Guns Blazing	Deenside Spark – Aghadown Heather	Tony Fell (Private)	18.90	5/4f	
1993	Fast Copper	Ballyard Hoffman – Parkswood Magpie	John Copplestone (Reading)	18.34	1/2f	
1994	Fast Copper	Ballyard Hoffman – Parkswood Magpie	Wayne Burrow (Reading)	18.49	6-4f	
1995	Sunkleep	Flashy Sir – Skimmer	Barry Wileman (Private)	18.96	12/1	
1996	Vannahs Flyer	Whisper Wishes – Helens Special	David Pruhs (Peterborough)	18.78	3/1	
1997	Tanroyd Sammy	Super Hoffman – Laganore Queen	Dave Hopper (Sheffield)	18.78	5/1	
1998	Crescent Classic	Mustang Jack – Roving Bunnie	Linda Jones (Walthamstow)	18.11	4/6f	
1999	Gulleen Slaney	Slaneyside Hare – Gulleen Elsa	Charlie Lister (Private)	18.07	1/1f	
2000	Elliots Pride	Slaneyside Hare – Rubys Bridge	Martin Burt (Monmore)	17.95	9/1	
2001	Nervous Paddy	Frightful Flash – Fees Chance	Carol Evans (Private)	17.81	10/11f	Track record
2002	Very Hot	He Knows – Playful Sapphire	Harry Crapper (Sheffield)	18.08	4/1	
2003	Louisville	Larkhill Jo – Woman Power	John Mullins (Walthamstow)	17.74	6/1	
2004	Ningbo Jack	Honcho Classic – Pennys Spotlight	Charlie Lister OBE (Private)	17.78	2/1	
2005	Clounlaheen	Daves Mentor – First Alone	Mick Hurst (Pelaw Grange)	17.74	6/1	
2006	Centaur Striker	Brett Lee – Murlens Chance	Charlie Lister OBE (Private)	17.82	14/1	
2007	Unique Option	Top Savings – Turbo Flight	David Pruhs (Peterborough)	18.05	3/1	
2008	Horseshoe Ping	Top Honcho – Lucy May	Jim Reynolds (Romford)	17.99	2/1	
2009	Jimmy Lollie	World Class – Droopys Kara	Seamus Cahill (Hove)	17.67	5/2	
2010	Jimmy Lollie	World Class – Droopys Kara	Seamus Cahill (Hove)	17.90	2/1	
2011	Drumcove Lad	Scarty Lad – Drumcove Fancy	Chris Allsopp (Monmore)	17.91	9/4	
2012	Jumeirah Dubai	Slip The Lark – Droopys Just Hot	Julie Calvert (Sunderland)	17.71	4/6f	
2013	Helenas Sailor	Droopys Scolari – Lenas Maggie	Paul Donovan (Wimbledon)	17.67	6/4f	
2014	Geelo Vegas	Cashen Legend – Ceol May	Carl Perry (Private)	17.77	11/4	
2015	Scolari Sound	Droopys Scolari – Turn It Up	David Pruhs (Peterborough)	17.56	4/6f	
2016	Trapstyle Jet	Droopys Jet - Cairns Risky	Jean Liles (Towcester)	17.64	5/2	
2017	Queen Anna	Tullymurry Act – Skate On	Liz McNair (Private)	17.83	9/4	
2018	Calzaghe Flash	Tyrur Big Mike – Headford Maura	Ted Soppitt (Newcastle)	17.55	1/1f	
2019	Troy Bella	Tyrur Big Mike – Fire Height Brid	David Mullins (Romford)	17.79	2/1	
2020	Loggies Lito	Droopys Jet – Ballymac Galtee	Simon Harms (Private)	17.88	11/8f	
2021	Crossfield Dusty	Droopys Jet – Crossfield Kate	Patrick Janssens (Towcester)	17.65	8/11f	
2022	Gougane Jet	Droopys Jet – Paper Doll	Mark Wallis (Henlow)	17.56	5/4f	
2023	Bombout Bullet	Ballymac Best – Carmac Luna	Belinda Green (Hove)	17.52	4/7f	
2024	Niosfearrnabolt	Ballymac Kingdom – Ballymac Scala	Chloe Hardy (Newcastle)	18.20	6/1	
2025	Shadow Storm	Ballymac Best – Kilara Jessie	Richard Rees (Brighton)	17.54	4/7f	
