= Eclipse (greyhounds) =

British greyhound racing competition

The Eclipse
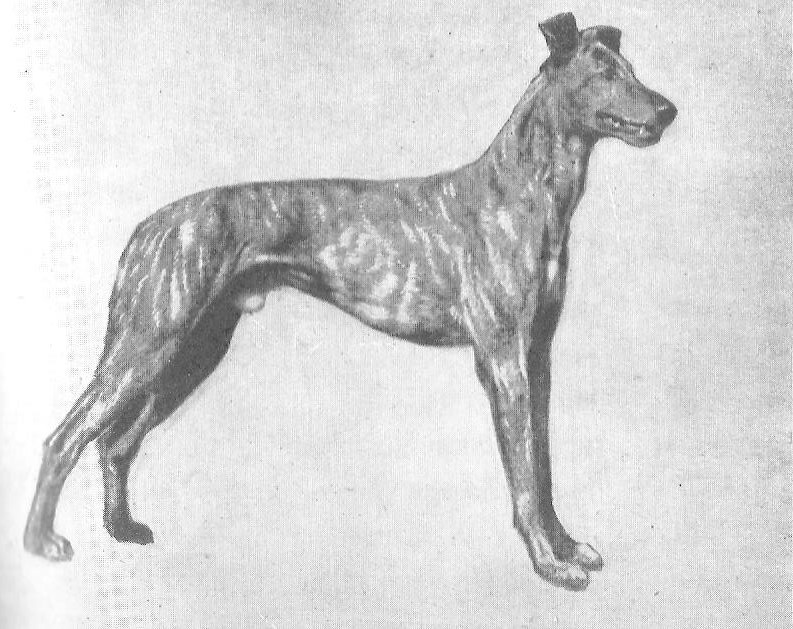
- 1942 winner, Ballynennan Moon
- Class: Category 1
- Location: Nottingham Stadium
- Inaugurated: 1938
- Sponsor: Premier Greyhound Racing

Race information
- Distance: 500 metres
- Surface: Sand
- Purse: £20,000 (winner)

The Eclipse is a greyhound racing competition held annually at Nottingham Greyhound Stadium.

It was inaugurated in 1938 at Lythalls Lane Stadium in Coventry. Following the closure of the stadium in 1964 the competition ended for a period of three years before briefly being re-introduced at Kings Heath Stadium.

Kings Heath closed down in 1971 which led to Hall Green Stadium acting as a temporary host before the race returned to its roots in Coventry at the Brandon Stadium. Coventry stopped greyhound racing in 1986, which resulted in Nottingham taking the event and holding it since. In 2022, the prize money increased with the sponsorship of Premier Greyhound Racing and the winners purse was £20,000.

== Venues and distances ==
- 1938-1964 (Lythalls Lane, Coventry)
- 1967-1970 (Kings Heath)
- 1971-1972 (Hall Green, 480y)
- 1979-1985 (Brandon, Coventry)
- 1987–present (Nottingham, 500m)

== Past winners ==
Year	Winner	Breeding	Trainer	Time (sec)	SP	Notes/ref
1938	Cinderella of Waterhall	Beef Cutlet	Bill Cowell (Wembley)	28.87	20/1	dead-heat
1938	Demotic Mack	Beef Cutlet - Kaiti Hill	Charles Cross (Clapton)	28.87	10/11f	dead-heat
1939	Selsey Cutlet	Future Cutlet – Happy Freda	Leslie Reynolds (Wembley)	30.65	5/2	
1942	Ballynennan Moon	Mr Moon – Banriogan Dann	Sidney Orton (Wimbledon)	29.60	1/2f	
1943	Model Dasher	Model Whiskey - Dashing Comet	Tom Baldwin (Perry Barr)	29.81	9/2	
1944	Winnie of Berrow	Beef Cutlet – Jubilee Joan	Joe Farrand (Oxford)	30.40	6/1	
1945	Robeen Printer	Dans Leg - Deoc Deireannach	George McKay (Coventry)		4/5f	dead-heat
1945	Prancing Kitty	Tanist - Be Careful Kitty	Paddy Fortune (Wimbledon)		4/1	dead-heat
1946	Judge's Nip			30.26	7/2	
1947	Castletown Tiptoes	Castledown Lad - Hotcap	D Hayes (Coventry)	29.46	2/1	
1948	Whiterock Abbey	Farloe Cutlet – Acetone	Sidney Orton (Wimbledon)	42.45	11/4jf	
1949	Behattan Marquis	Countryman - Behattan	Bob Burls (Wembley)	29.49	4/1	
1950	Whistling Laddie	Lone Seal – Whistling Rum	Stan Martin (Wimbledon)	29.58	10/1	
1951	Noble Greason	Mad Tanist – Imperial Girl	Jack Harvey (Wembley)	29.88	100/8	
1952	Crowned Champion	Paddy the Champion – Tanist More	Ron Chamberlain (Private)	29.65	11/8	
1953	Marsh Harrier	Mad Tanist - Misty	Paddy McEvoy (Private)	29.76	6/1	
1956	Duke Of Alva	Ballymac Ball - Marchioness Minnie	Ted Brennan (Owlerton)	29.60	4/5f	
1960	Galbally Airways	Imperial Airways – Brenda From Ards	Dr Dennis O'Brien (Private)	29.74	5/4f	
1961	Faithful Charlie	Glittering Look – Lady Artic	Jim Irving (Private)	29.25		
1962	Moyne Rocket	The Grand Fire – Moyne Dancer	Jack Harvey (Wembley)	29.31		
1963	Piper Apache	The Grand Genius – Wee Look	Eric Adkins (Private)	29.69		
1964	Shotblast	Knockrour Again – Cleggan Lady	Les Brown (Wolverhampton)	29.86	3/1	
1967	Nancys Flash	Prairie Flash – Biddy Mulligan	Paddy Coughlan (Private)	26.24		
1968	Winter Hope	Newdown Heather – Final Score	Des Dare (Private)	26.55		
1969	Golf Ball Again	Newdown Heather – Lovely Ransom	Noreen Collin (Private)	26.79	5/2	
1970	Cool Breeze	Handy Valley – Alley Rose	John Coleman (Romford)	27.19	3/1	
1971	Gypsy Jim	Myross Again – Longstown Lassie	John Coleman (Romford)			
1972	Mels Pupil	Monalee King – Ella's Rocket	Frank Baldwin (Perry Barr)	28.12	2/1	
1979	Sarahs Bunny	Jimsun - Sugarloaf Bunny	Geoff De Mulder (Hall Green)	28.74	4/6f	
1980	Inca Boy	Kilbelin Style - Anhid Express	Leo Pugh (Hall Green)	28.42	7/4f	
1981	Red Prim	Ballybeg Prim - Red Rosette	Jim Barrett (Cradley Heath)	28.94	9/4	
1982	Ardralla Victor	Gaily Noble - Gay Lady	Maurice Buckland (Norton Canes)	28.67	7/4	
1983	Ballyard McEnroe	Peruvian Style - Dainty Black	Bertie Gaynor (Coventry)	28.83	3/1	
1984	Tinahue Blond	Ballarat Prince - Tinahue Mist	Bertie Gaynor (Coventry)	28.67	7/1	
1985	Parkers Gold	Glenroe Hiker - Parkers Poacher	Bertie Gaynor (Hall Green)	28.73	4/1	
1987	Holiday Hope	Tamarac - Bean Phaidin	Pat Ryan (Monmore)	30.81	2/1jf	
1988	Gulleen Wishes	Whisper Wishes - Seaway Linda	Dave Conway (Swaffham)	18.62	5/2	
1989	Westmead Harry	Fearless Champ - Westmead Move	Nick Savva (Private)	30.30	12/1	
1990	Bawnard It	Special Merchant - Bawnard Mona	John McGee Sr. (Hackney)	30.69	12/1	
1991	Moyglare King	Ninth Wave - Moyglare Jip	Pat McCombe (Belle Vue)	30.47	14/1	
1992	New Level	Murlens Slippy - Well Plucked	Harry Williams (Sunderland)	29.94	9/4jf	
1993	Tromora Mayor	Manorville Major - Born To Race	Norman Johnson (Norton Canes)	29.99	20/1	
1994	Spit It Out	Phantom Flash - Ivalog	Michael Bacon (Perry Barr)	29.80	14/1	
1995	Moyle Knight	Daleys Gold - Still Knight	David Pruhs (Peterborough)	29.85	9/4	
1996	Some Picture	Slaneyside Hare - Spring Season	Charlie Lister (Nottingham)	29.83	3/1jf	
1997	Larkhill Jo	Staplers Jo - Westmead Flight	Nick Savva (Walthamstow)	30.48	1/1f	
1998	Laughta Man	Ardraville Bridge - Bibis Princess	Billy Mills (Perry Barr)	30.21	7/2	
1999	Mumble Swerve	Druids Wally - Rhincrew Diane	Linda Jones (Walthamstow)	30.52	7/2	
2000	Blue Tex	Thorgil Tex - Dons Pride	Brian Clemenson (Hove)	30.03	6/4jf	
2001	Bold Mossy	Larkhill Jo - Annies Bullet	Jim Reynolds (Walthamstow)	30.09	4/1	
2002	Texan Fox	Thorgil Tex - Ursulas Fox	John McGee Sr. (Private)	29.74	7/2	
2003	Rockforest Pride	Judicial Pride - Brandy Mandy	David Pruhs (Peterborough)	30.49	9/4	
2004	Ballybrazil Hero	Carlton Bale - Tycoon Kay	Brian Clemenson (Hove)	30.53	3/1	
2005	Fear Me	No Tail Told - Femme Fatale	Charlie Lister (Private)	29.47	4/5f	
2006	Clash Harmonica	Fortune Mike - Clash Minnie	Charlie Lister (Private)	29.50	5/2	
2007	Rev Counter	Top Honcho - Curryhills Fairy	Chris Allsopp (Monmore)	29.91	6/1	
2008	Wise Thought	Climate Control - Sierra Mist	Martin White (Private)	29.62	2/5f	
2009	Eye Onthe Storm	Droopys Vieri-Bower Louise	Mark Wallis (Harlow)	29.51	100/30	
2010	Nambisco	Big Daddy Cool-Airport Boss	Carly Philpott (Private)	30.96	5/2jf	
2011	Mill Bling Bling	Bombastic Shiraz – Respect For Lee	Kelly Macari (Sunderland)	29.75	7/4	
2012	Sawpit Sensation	Head Bound – No Joke Sherry	David Hunt (Perry Barr)	29.16	11/2	Track record
2013	Bridge Honcho	Hondo Black – Forest Baby	Mark Wallis (Yarmouth)	29.29	3/1	
2014	Fit To Win	Hondo Black – Have A Fit	Tony Collett (Wimbledon)	29.53	10/1	
2015	Pinpoint Boom	Shaneboy Lee – Newmarket Way	Kelly Macari (Sunderland)	29.74	20/1	
2016	Droopys Buick	Yeah Man – Droopys Hilda	Jimmy Wright (Newcastle)	30.14	7/4	
2017	Bubbly Bluebird	Droopys Sydney - Broadstrand Xola	Paul Young (Romford)	29.62	4/1	
2018	Dorotas Wildcat	Ballymac Vic – Droopys Danneel	Kevin Hutton (Monmore)	29.35	4/6f	
2019	Ice on Fire	Crash – Bigmans Grainne	James Fenwick (Newcastle)	29.25	4/9f	
2020	No race due to (COVID-19 pandemic)					
2021	Signet Ace	Laughil Blake – Forest Natalee	Kevin Hutton (Towcester)	29.41	11/10f	
2022	Slick Sakina	Droopys Sydney – Droopys Ring	Patrick Janssens (Towcester)	29.77	2/1f	
2023	Newinn Syd	Droopys Sydney – Newinn Mimi	Mark Wallis (Henlow)	29.51	2/1	
2024	Romeo Command	Dorotas Wildcat – Drive On Betsy	Patrick Janssens (Towcester)	29.87	3/1	
2025	Proper Heiress	Droopys Sydney – Powerful Mush	Mark Wallis (Private)	28.95	8/11f	Track record

== Sponsors ==
- 1994–1994 (Peter Derrick Bookmakers)
- 2001–2001 (John Smith's)
- 2002–2002 (Ladbrokes)
- 2003–2003 (Stadium Bookmakers)
- 2004–2017 (Betfred)
- 2018–2018 (MSCM Ltd)
- 2019–2020 (Carling Brewery)
- 2021–2021 (Arena Racing Company)
- 2022–2025 (Premier Greyhound Racing)
