= 1997 Irish Greyhound Derby =

1997 Ireland on Sunday Irish Greyhound Derby
- Venue: Shelbourne Park
- Location: Dublin
- End date: 4 October
- Total prize money: £50,000 (winner)

The 1997 Irish Greyhound Derby took place during August, September and October with the final being held at Shelbourne Park in Dublin on 4 October 1997.

The winner Toms The Best won £50,000 and was trained by Nick Savva, owned by Eddie Shotton and bred by Ian Greaves. The race was sponsored by the Ireland on Sunday.

== Final result ==
At Shelbourne, 4 October (over 550 yards):

Position	Winner	Breeding	Trap	SP	Time	Trainer
1st	Toms The Best	Frightful Flash - Ladys Guest	6	4-1	30.09	Nick Savva (England)
2nd	Vintage Prince	Slaneyside Hare - Ferbane Skippy	3	9-4jf	30.14	Joe Kenny
3rd	Right To Apply	frightful Flash - Hymenstown Lynn	2	16-1	30.30	Frazer Black
4th	Jokers Run	Deenside Joker - Dream Run	1	25-1	30.56	Joe Coyle
5th	Some Picture	Slaneyside Hare - Spring Season	5	9-4jf	30.58	Charlie Lister (England)
6th	Spiral Nikita	Phantom Flash - Minnies Nikita	4	3-1	30.62	Eileen Gleeson

=== Distances ===
¾, 2, 3¼, head, ½ (lengths)

== Competition Report ==
The English challenge for the newly sponsored Ireland on Sunday Irish Greyhound Derby was very strong with the 1997 English Greyhound Derby and 1997 Scottish Greyhound Derby champion Some Picture leading the ante-post betting and looking to become the first greyhound in history to achieve the modern triple crown (Irish Derby instead of Welsh Greyhound Derby). Toms the Best was also considered a leading contender for the event.

In the qualifying round Some Picture recorded a fast win in 30.24 and there were good wins for Forest Jet and Spiral Nikita. In the first round, Some Picture went even faster recording 30.12 despite running very wide. The 525 track record holder Cool Panther won in 30.27 and Vintage Prince recorded a fast 30.19.

Elderberry Chick set the best second round time with a 30.07 and 1995 Irish Greyhound Derby winner Batties Rocket, Vintage Prince and Spiral Nikita all won but there was a shock defeat when Some Picture lost out to Borna Best. In the quarter-finals there was a heat that contained three of the leading contenders and all three qualified with Spiral Nikita beating Some Picture and Toms the Best. The other heats were won by Vintage Prince, Batties Rocket and Dynamic Boot.

Both semi-finals were won in 30.05, in the first Spiral Nikita beat Right to Apply and Toms the Best and in the second heat Vintage Prince defeated Some Picture and Jokers Run. Vintage Prince was now the favourite for the event.

The triple crown dream for Some Picture came to an end because he was slow away from the traps and then found trouble running into the controversially wide seeded Spiral Nikita. However, the perfectly drawn Toms the Best, trained by Nick Savva for owner Eddie Shotton, made a good start and he was just behind Vintage Prince for most of the race before his strong finish saw him catch Vintage Prince at the finish line in a very fast 30.09.

== See also ==
- 1997 UK & Ireland Greyhound Racing Year
