= 2016 UK & Ireland Greyhound Racing Year =

2016 UK & Ireland Greyhound Racing Year was the 91st year of greyhound racing in the United Kingdom and the 90th year of greyhound racing in Ireland.

== Summary ==
The year commenced with the category 2 Coronation Cup at Romford Greyhound Stadium which was shown live on Sky Sports. The final event was the Olympic at Brighton & Hove Greyhound Stadium.

The year was overshadowed by the ongoing saga regarding the uncertain future of the Greyhound Racing Association operated tracks of Wimbledon Stadium and Hall Green Stadium. An announcement was made that Wimbledon would close after the running of the 2016 English Greyhound Derby before a six-month reprieve arrived. However it was announced that the stadium would close in March 2017.

Wimbledon's sister track Hall Green remained in danger of being closed following the 2014 sale to Euro Property Investments Ltd.

The premier competition of the year, the English Greyhound Derby, was won by Jaytee Jet and the Irish Derby was taken by Rural Hawaii. Kevin Hutton secured his second successive trainers championship. Mark Wallis won the champion trainer trophy for a record eighth time passing the previous record of seven set by John 'Ginger' McGee Sr.

The year ended with two notable successes for Towcester, the first was being crowned BAGS/SIS Track Champions (greyhound racing's equivalent to footballs FA Cup and within days it was announced that the track would host the English Greyhound Derby for five years.

== Roll of honour ==
Major Winners
Award	Name of Winner
2016 English Greyhound Derby	Jaytee Jet - Paul Hennessy
2016 Irish Greyhound Derby	Rural Hawaii - Graham Holland
Greyhound Trainer of the Year	Mark Wallis (Towcester)
UK Greyhound of the Year	Droopys Buick - Jimmy Wright (Newcastle)
Irish Greyhound of the Year	Jaytee Jet - Paul Hennessy

Chelsea Glass Trainers Championship, Sittingbourne (16 February)
Pos	Name of Trainer	Points
1st	Kevin Hutton	53
2nd	Seamus Cahill	40
3rd	Paul Young	38
4th	Mark Wallis	33
5th	Dean Childs	31
6th	Hayley Keightley	29

BAGS/SIS Track Championship, Perry Barr (23 December)
Pos	Track	Points
1st	Towcester	56
2nd	Romford	54
3rd	Sheffield	54
4th	Peterborough	44
5th	Newcastle	40
6th	Nottingham	32

=== Principal UK finals ===
Ladbrokes Golden Jacket, Crayford (23 February, 714m, £17,500)
Pos	Name of Greyhound	Trap	SP	Time	Trainer
1st	Patchys Kerry	1	2-5f	44.94	Mark Wallis
2nd	Diesel Flo	2	7-1	45.46	Michael Fawsitt
3rd	Oneco Sky	5	5-1	45.86	Kevin Boon
4th	Racenight Jenny	3	14-1	46.00	June Harvey
5th	Clonmoyle Shane	6	20-1	46.22	Jennifer March
6th	Droopys Alberta	4	20-1	46.28	Jim Daly

Racing Post Scottish Derby, Shawfield (9 April, 480m, £20,000)
Pos	Name of Greyhound	Trap	SP	Time	Trainer
1st	Hot Pipe	6	25-1	29.09	Jim Brown
2nd	Fair Taxes	5	5-1	29.10	Francie Murray
3rd	Ballymac Matt	1	4-5f	29.12	Kelly Macari
4th	Eden The Kid	3	3-1	29.29	Liz Mcnair
5th	Droopys Buick	4	7-2	29.31	Jimmy Wright
6th	Leave At Dawn	2	10-1	29.39	Brendan Matthews

William Hill Classic, Sunderland (13 July, 450m, £25,000)
Pos	Name of Greyhound	Trap	SP	Time	Trainer
1st	Roxholme Scolari	3	8-1	26.75	Hayley Keightley
2nd	Coolavanny Rebel	6	7-2	26.90	Elaine Parker
3rd	Toolmaker Scot	1	5-4f	27.05	Robert Gleeson
4th	Southfield Jock	2	7-2	27.11	Seamus Cahill
5th	Baran Jack	5	33-1	27.31	Claude Gardiner
6th	Jaytee Spartacus	4	5-1	27.33	Paul Young

William Hill Grand Prix, Sunderland (13 July, 640m, £15,000)
Pos	Name of Greyhound	Trap	SP	Time	Trainer
1st	Pinpoint Boom	1	2-5f	39.27	Kelly Macari
2nd	Mustang Golden	3	6-1	39.55	Paul Young
3rd	Farley Rio	5	14-1	39.88	Kevin Boon
4th	Fearsome Code	6	25-1	40.50	Debbie Calvert
5th	Swift Leonard	2	14-1	40.60	Gary Carmichael
6th	Zulu Baran	4	5-1	41.06	Claude Gardiner

Colossus Bets TV Trophy, Towcester (3 August, 906m, £8,000)
Pos	Name of Greyhound	Trap	SP	Time	Trainer
1st	Borna Mindy	2	7-2	56.57	Diane Henry
2nd	Ballymac Bonnie	5	4-6f	56.68	Liam Dowling
3rd	Ribble Atom	4	7-2	57.07	Mark Wallis
4th	Lemon Lyric	1	40-1	57.30	Paul Young
5th	Spa Road Piper	3	16-1	57.31	Kevin Boon
6th	Kilfane King	6	40-1	57.36	Pat Doocey

MTS Grand National, Sittingbourne (4 October, 480mH, £8,000)
Pos	Name of Greyhound	Trap	SP	Time	Trainer
1st	Ballymac Manix	2	9-4	29.32	Seamus Cahill
2nd	Razldazl Raidio	6	2-5f	29.41	Ricky Holloway
3rd	Coolavanny Bono	1	33-1	29.65	Bob Pattinson
4th	Fridays Sean	4	25-1	29.78	Julie Luckhurst
5th	Bua Frank	5	40-1	29.93	Barry O'Sullivan
6th	Sidarian Blitz	3	33-1	00.00	Heather Dimmock

William Hill St Leger, Wimbledon (8 November, 687m, £25,000)
Pos	Name of Greyhound	Trap	SP	Time	Trainer
1st	Ferryforth Fran	6	20-1	41.90	Mark Wallis
2nd	Fizzypop Buddy	5	13-8	42.05	June Harvey
3rd	Cloran Paddy	1	11-8f	41.17	Charlie Lister OBE
4th	Huarache Madison	4	9-1	41.23	Kevin Hutton
5th	Rubys Rascal	3	6-1	41.24	Mark Wallis
6th	Billys Bullet	2	20-1	41.37	Mark Wallis

RPGTV Oaks, Belle Vue (14 December, 470m, £10,000)
Pos	Name of Greyhound	Trap	SP	Time	Trainer
1st	Forest Twilight	2	6-4f	27.79	Hayley Keightley
2nd	Domino Storm	4	7-4	27.91	Mark Wallis
3rd	Droopys Two	6	6-1	27.97	Dean Childs
4th	Barnagrane Glen	5	14-1	28.30	Chris Allsopp
5th	Huarache Madison	3	6-1	28.37	Kevin Hutton
6th	Steely Charm	1	10-1	28.43	John Walton

RPGTV Laurels, Belle Vue (14 December, 470m, £6,000)
Pos	Name of Greyhound	Trap	SP	Time	Trainer
1st	Hiya Butt	3	5-4f	27.49	Hayley Keightley
2nd	Oscar Junior	4	11-4	27.63	Charlie Lister OBE
3rd	Droopys Country	6	4-1	28.30	Jimmy Wright
4th	Charity Dragon	5	10-1	28.70	Pat Rosney
5th	Killieford Kane	2	25-1	28.78	Neil Black
6th	Dorotas Tiger	1	6-1	28.83	Kevin Hutton

=== Principal Irish finals ===
Ladbrokes Easter Cup, Shelbourne (19 March, 550y, €25,000)
Pos	Name of Greyhound	Trap	SP	Time	Trainer
1st	Jaytee Jet	5	6-4	29.45	Paul Hennessy
2nd	Skywalker Rory	4	7-1	29.62	Graham Holland
3rd	Lenson Sanchez	3	6-1	30.08	Pat Buckley
4th	Slippery Fred	2	7-2	30.09	Larry Dunne
5th	Peregrine Falcon	1	3-1	30.14	Pat Curtin
6th	Only For Life	6	33-1	30.19	James Melia

Kirby Memorial Stakes, Limerick (9 April, 525y, €80,000)
Pos	Name of Greyhound	Trap	SP	Time	Trainer
1st	Droopys Roddick	4	7-2	28.09	Pat Buckley
2nd	Riverside Oscar	5	20-1	28.65	Graham Holland
3rd	Witches Belle	3	5-2	28.86	Liam Twomey
4th	Riverside Chip	1	20-1	28.87	Graham Holland
5th	Clares Rocket	2	4-6f	29.43	Graham Holland
6th	Maytown Eclipse	6	8-1	30.20	Peadar Woods

B.I.F National Produce, Clonmel (22 May, 525y, €30,000)
Pos	Name of Greyhound	Trap	SP	Time	Trainer
1st	Clares Rocket	6	1-2f	28.00	Graham Holland
2nd	Anopheles	3	10-1	28.45	Liam Dowling
3rd	Crohane Ronnie	5	25-1	28.49	Declan Byrne
4th	Jo Jo Fantasy	2	5-1	28.50	Graham Holland
5th	Escapism	4	4-1	28.81	Owen McKenna
6th	Mountaylor Queen	1	14-1	29.09	Jennifer O'Donnell

Sporting Press Oaks, Shelbourne (11 June, 525y, €25,000)
Pos	Name of Greyhound	Trap	SP	Time	Trainer
1st	Witches Belle	6	6-1	28.44	Liam Twomey
2nd	Leamaneigh Mags	5	6-1	28.61	Owen McKenna
3rd	Sidarian Pearl	2	1-2f	28.79	Graham Holland
4th	Holycross Leah	4	4-1	28.81	James Melia
5th	High St Jesse	1	14-1	28.86	Rachel Wheeler
6th	Ballymac Sarahjo	3	20-1	28.97	Liam Dowling

Irish Independent Laurels, Cork (16 July, 525y, €30,000)
Pos	Name of Greyhound	Trap	SP	Time	Trainer
1st	Skywalker Manner	2	5-1	28.29	Graham Holland
2nd	Farloe Rumble	4	2-1f	28.39	Owen McKenna
3rd	Ela Alecko	1	5-2	28.50	Peter Cronin
4th	Rural Hawaii	6	6-1	28.57	Graham Holland
5th	Must Be Jack	5	5-2	28.64	Peter Cronin
6th	Borna Candy	3	14-1	28.88	Ruairi Dwan

Doire Construction Champion Stakes, Shelbourne (30 July, 550y, €15,000)
Pos	Name of Greyhound	Trap	SP	Time	Trainer
1st	Clares Rocket	5	1-6f	29.29	Graham Holland
2nd	Droopys Awesome	1	12-1	29.46	Fraser Black
3rd	Farloe Joey	2	8-1	29.67	Owen Mckenna
4th	Mucho Macho Man	3	20-1	29.92	Paul Hennessy
5th	Swords Ace	4	10-1	30.20	Marie Gilbert
N/R	Highway Event	6			Graham Holland

Dublin Coach Juvenile Derby, Harolds Cross (14 October, 525y, €22,500)
Pos	Name of Greyhound	Trap	SP	Time	Trainer
1st	Droopys Wilbury	2	3-1	28.21	Pat Buckley
2nd	Mustang Kasco	1	6-1	28.28	Peter Cronin
3rd	Bull Run Bolt	5	6-4f	28.38	Patrick Norris
4th	Coolio	6	4-1	28.44	Thomas Burke & John Byrne
5th	Droopys Smasher	3	9-2	28.72	Pat Buckley
6th	Droopys Jack	4	10-1	28.89	John Linehan

Kerry Agribusiness Irish St Leger, Limerick (29 October, 550y, €25,000)
Pos	Name of Greyhound	Trap	SP	Time	Trainer
1st	Priceless Brandy	4	4-5f	29.30	Paul Hennessy
2nd	Native Chimes	2	8-1	29.75	Johnny O'Sullivan
3rd	Jaytee Dutch	5	5-1	29.93	Paul Hennessy
4th	Swithins Brae	1	2-1	29.96	Peter Cronin
5th	Country Legend	3	10-1	30.00	Maurice Heffernan
6th	Leave At Dawn	6	6-1	30.07	Brendan Matthews

=== UK Category 1 & 2 competitions ===
Competition	Date	Venue	Winning Greyhound	Winning Trainer	Time	SP	Notes
Coral Coronation Cup	13 January	Romford	Millwards Master	Paul Young (Romford)	34.81	10-1	
Prestige	27 January	Hall Green	Deanridge Pennys	John Mullins (Yarmouth)	39.87	8-1	
William Hill Springbok	8 March	Wimbledon	Ballymac Manix	Seamus Cahill (Hove)	29.11	2-1	
Racing Post Juvenile	8 March	Wimbledon	Ballymac Ramsey	Barrie Draper (Sheffield)	28.65	7-2	
Ladbrokes Puppy Derby	17 March	Monmore	Castell Henry	Philip Simmonds (Romford)	28.30	10-1	
Coral Golden Sprint	18 March	Romford	Droopys Story	Paul Young (Romford)	24.13	5-2f	
Calne Racing Arc	23 March	Swindon	Ballymac Brogan	Seamus Cahill (Hove)	28.49	9-4jf	
Three Steps to Victory	5 April	Sheffield	Patchys Kerry	Mark Wallis (Towcester)	38.77	2-5f	
Betfred Gymcrack	20 April	Kinsley	Droopys Trapeze	Jimmy Wright (Newcastle)	27.23	2-1	
Coral Regency	4 May	Hove	Billys Bullet	Mark Wallis (Towcester)	41.31	4-1	
William Hill Champion Hurdle	4 June	Wimbledon	Razldazl Raidio	Ricky Holloway (Sittingbourne)	28.90	11-8f	
Golden Crest	25 June	Poole	Castlehyde King	Bill Black (Poole)	26.36	9-2	
Betfred Select Stakes	5 July	Nottingham	Domino Storm	Mark Wallis (Towcester)	29.34	6-1	
British Bred Produce Stakes	23 July	Swindon	Bansha Rooskey	Dave Acott (Perry Barr)	28.83	7-1	
Coral Sussex Cup	27 July	Hove	Barricane Tiger	Patrick Janssens (Towcester)	29.79	8-1	
Ladbrokes Gold Cup	18 August	Monmore	Jaytee Spartacus	Paul Young (Romford)	27.83	5-2	
Ladbrokes Summer Stayers Classic	18 August	Monmore	Ferryforth Fran	Mark Wallis (Towcester)	37.86	14-1	
Kai Laidlaw Trafalgar Cup	18 August	Monmore	Charity Dragon	Pat Rosney (Private)	28.20	3-1	
Lowther Stakes	27 August	Towcester	Crossfield Molly	Seamus Cahill (Hove)	29.45	7-1	
Puppy Classic	29 August	Nottingham	Bubbly Bluebird	Paul Young (Romford)	29.75	4-5f	
Coral Champion Stakes	31 August	Romford	Ascot Woodie	John Mullins (Yarmouth)	35.40	8-1	
Betfred Steel City Cup	6 September	Sheffield	Pinpoint Den	Kelly Macari (Sunderland)	28.56	7-2	
East Anglian Derby	14 September	Yarmouth	Clondoty Alex	Mark Wallis (Towcester)	27.79	9-2	
Yorkshire St Leger	21 September	Doncaster	Rubys Rascal	Mark Wallis (Towcester)	41.10	5-4f	
Ladbrokes Gold Collar	27 September	Crayford	Yahoo Victor	Barry O'Sullivan (Crayford)	33.54	9-2	
Guys and Dolls	27 September	Crayford	Brick Mansions	Katie O'Flaherty (Crayford)	23.22	4-1	
Romford Puppy Cup	30 September	Romford	Kooga Klammer	David Pruhs (Peterborough)	23.75	2-1	
BAPP Group Scurry Cup	1 October	Belle Vue	Walshes Hill	Jimmy Wright (Newcastle)	15.14	4-7f	
BAPP Group Northern Flat	1 October	Belle Vue	Ballymac Galtee	Brian Stuart (Private)	27.75	4-1	
Kent Derby	4 October	Sittingbourne	Bubbly Bluebird	Paul Young (Romford)	28.87	5-4f	
William Hill All England Cup	13 October	Newcastle	Oscar Whisky	Charlie Lister OBE (Private)	28.26	5-4f	
William Hill Northern Puppy Derby	13 October	Newcastle	Kildallon Bolt	Heather Dimmock (Towcester)	28.65	1-2f	
British Breeders Stakes	25 October	Nottingham	Badabing	John Mullins (Yarmouth)	29.94	8-1	
Kai Laidlaw St Mungo Cup	29 October	Shawfield	Killieford Kane	Neil Black (Private)	29.30	1-1f	
RPGTV Henlow Derby	30 October	Henlow	Lenson Santi	Tony Collett (Sittingbourne)	27.41	6-1	
Brighton Belle	3 November	Hove	Banabane	Seamus Cahill (Hove)	29.69	4-5f	
RFS Puppy Derby	8 November	Wimbledon	King Eden	Liz McNair (Private)	28.46	20-1	
Betfred Eclipse	22 November	Nottingham	Droopys Buick	Jimmy Wright (Newcastle)	30.14	7-4	
Carlsberg Kent St Leger	26 November	Crayford	Jimbobjoe	Ricky Holloway (Central Park)	45.60	9-4	
British Bred Derby	29 November	Towcester	Russanda Rubin	James Hayton (Kinsley)	29.93	11-4	
Coral Essex Vase	7 December	Romford	Bubbly Torpedo	Paul Young (Romford)	35.24	3-1	
National Sprint	19 December	Nottingham	Trapstyle Jet	Jean Liles (Towcester)	17.64	5-2	
Coral Olympic	29 December	Hove	Droopys Buick	Jimmy Wright (Newcastle)	29.89	2-5f	

=== Irish feature competitions ===
Competition	Date	Venue	Winning Greyhound	Winning Trainer	Time	SP	Notes
Best Car Parks Gold Cup	20 February	Shelbourne	Slippery Fred	Larry Dunne	28.62	6-4f	
Juvenile Classic	Mar 4	Tralee	Escapism	Owen McKenna	28.35	3-1	
McCalmont Cup	8 April	Kilkenny	Doctor Zhivago	David Flanagan	29.02	6-1	
Gain Feeds Cesarewitch	10 April	Mullingar	Slippery Fred	Pat Buckley	33.31	12-1	
Gain Open 600	30 April	Shelbourne	Ballyhooly Henry	Tom O'Neill	32.24	4-7f	
Boylesports Race of Champions	27 May	Tralee	Paradise Maverick	Pat Buckley	29.61	4-1	
Marshes Dundalk International	12 July	Dundalk	Droopys Roddick	Pat Buckley	29.40	9-4	Track record
Gain Corn Cuchulainn	29 July	Harold's Cross	Airmount Tess	Gerald Kiely	41.84	3-1	
Thurles Fresh Milk Tipperary Cup	31 July	Thurles	Skiproe Master	Pat Curtin	28.66		
Bar One Racing Irish Sprint Cup	14 August	Dundalk	Ballymac BigMike	Robert Gleeson	21.01	6-4f	
Gain Feeds Select Stakes	5 November	Waterford	Riverside Oscar	Graham Holland	28.42	5-2	
HRX Irish Grand National	2 December	Harolds Cross	BrinkleysDominic	Pat Buckley	29.60	5-4f	
