= Peterborough Greyhound Stadium =

UK dog racing track (1931–2020)

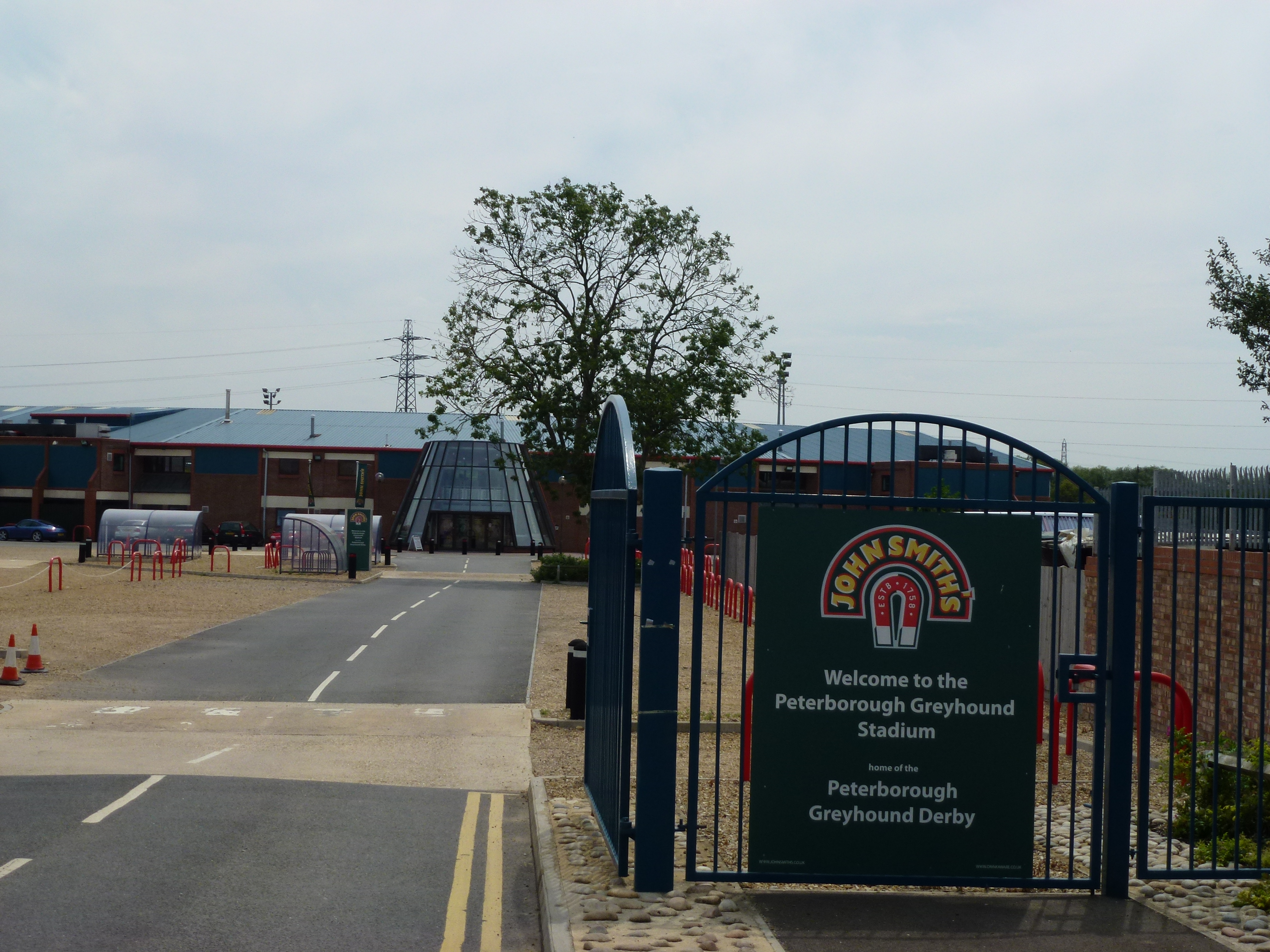
- The stadium entrance in 2011
- Interactive map of Peterborough Greyhound Stadium
- Location: Fengate, Peterborough, Cambridgeshire PE1 5BP
- Coordinates: 52°34′08.2″N 0°13′17.1″W

Construction
- Opened: 1931
- Renovated: 1988
- Expanded: 2003
- Closed: 2020

Tenant
- Greyhound racing

Peterborough Greyhound Stadium was a greyhound racing track located in Fengate, less than a mile from the centre of Peterborough, England.

Racing at the stadium took place every Wednesday, Friday and Saturday night with racing starting at 7:30 pm.

On Tuesday 19 May 2020, the stadium announced that it would cease trading with immediate effect after 75 years.

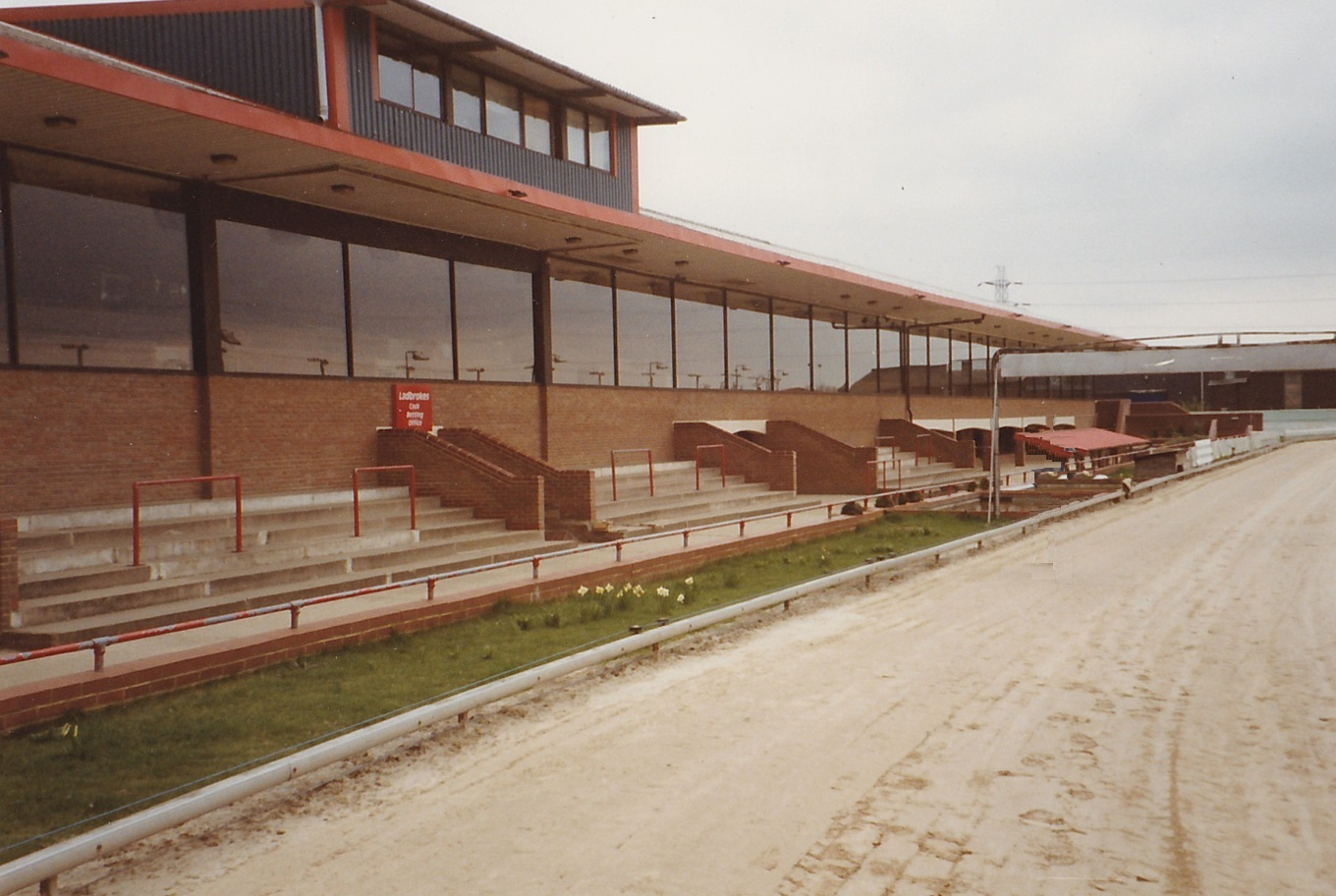
Peterborough Greyhound Stadium c.1980

== Origins and opening ==
The Liberty of Peterborough was an historic area comprising around thirty parishes, and it was in 1931 that the Peterborough Racing Club opened their new greyhound track within the Liberty. The venue was described as being off Star Road which is misleading because although this is in the Fengate area the actual track was off the Fengate Road. The plot of land chosen for the track was in south-east Fengate directly north of Peterborough Corporation sewage pumping station. The opening night was on Saturday 4 April 1931, consisting of twelve races. The managing director was G Hooke and organised racing was held every Monday and Saturday which consisted mainly of greyhounds but also whippet races.

The first ever winner was a greyhound called 'Dewdrop'. The second meeting on Monday 6 April was recorded as being a record crowd for the area with 400 being present. Racing continued up until the war with a maximum capacity of 700 being able to attend the track. It is also reported that facilities were very basic with the hare still being moved around the track by the power of two men cycling.

== History ==
After the war there was a major milestone for the track when Reg Perkins from a farming and transport business family and George Ellingworth a garage owner purchased the track in 1945 and quickly began to improve facilities. The purchase came at the right time because greyhound racing hit its peak in 1946 and it is known that one year later in 1947 the track had a totalisator turnover of £49,719. By this time it was also known as the Peterborough Sports Stadium and Reg Perkins took sole control several years later following the death of George Ellingworth.

The racing continued independent of the National Greyhound Racing Club (NGRC) but remained popular with the local population and by the sixties the stadium offered licensed bars and refreshments, photo finish apparatus and on course bookmakers and an 'Outside Sumner' hare. The immediate area also underwent major changes with industrial units appearing with frequent regularity and a road called First Drove serving as the entrance to the stadium.

In 1977 Reg Perkins retired leaving the day-to-day management to his sons Rex and David with racing on Tuesday and Saturday evenings at 7.15pm. Track distances at this time were 275, 475 & 675 yards and there were now nine track bookmakers. The second major milestone arrived in 1982 following the decision of the management to join the NGRC permit scheme that was in operation at the time. This allowed smaller tracks to run under NGRC rules at reduced rates and was the catalyst for Peterborough to improve in stature. In 1983 the Peterborough Derby was inaugurated and soon became a very popular event at the track. The stadium reputation began to grow and Rex Perkins was elected the Mayor of Peterborough from 1987 and with his wife Margaret raised thousands of pounds for charities.

== Renovation ==
In 1988 grand plans were unveiled by local architects T. E. Titman Associates for a new grandstand and restaurant and following the completion of the half a million pounds project. The 'Raceview Restaurant' could seat 200 with a further 600 seats available on the glass fronted grandstand.

== Recent history ==
John 'Ginger' McGee Sr. joined the track and the Irishman won Greyhound Trainer of the Year in 1991 whilst attached to Peterborough. In 1998 Racing Manager Mike Middle left the track to assist with a new track at Wisbech Greyhound Stadium and was replaced by Con Baker. On 24 March 1999 the stadium suffered severe damage when a fire spread from an adjoining warehouse and destroyed two bars, a tote booth and a 250-person seating area. The damage resulted in a six-month closure but the management remained positive and rebuilt and refurbished, re-opening on the 21 September 1999.

2003 was a pivotal year for the track because Rex Perkins died after a long illness and his son Richard and nephew Rob dedicated a new £3 million extension to his name. The raceview seating area could now hold 1,000 spectators and corporate boxes were also added. Peterborough dropped Tuesday night racing in 2008 and was rewarded with a Bookmakers Afternoon Greyhound Service (BAGS) contract in 2012. At the end of 2014 the track became BAGS national champions after defeating five other tracks in the final at Nottingham Greyhound Stadium.

In 2018 the stadium signed a deal with ARC to race every Wednesday evening.

== Closure ==
The track closed due to the COVID-19 pandemic and when racing returned (18 May) following the lock-down Peterborough announced that they would not be re-opening until they sought further clarification from the Greyhound Board of Great Britain. The concerns over the financial implication of racing behind closed doors was evident and the following day (20 May) the Perkins family announced the permanent closure of the track.

== Competitions ==
=== Peterborough Derby ===
Year	Winner	Breeding	Trainer	Time	SP	Notes
1983	Dutch Jet	Indian Joe – Flying Socks	Jean Talmage (Rye House)	26.11	10-1	
1984	Decoy Moon	Decoy Sovereign – Tibbys Girl	Pam Cobbold (Private)	25.92	4-1	
1985	Decoy Tulip	Decoy Sovereign – Tibbys Girl	Pam Cobbold (Private)	26.12	14-1	
1986	Stylish Start	Yellow Band – Flying Chick	Jean Talmage (Private)	26.28	5-2f	
1987	Quick Judgement	Blushing Spy - Marsena	Linda Pruhs - Peterborough	26.61	7-1	
1988	Lissadell Tiger	Bold Work –Cleonas Style	Ernie Gaskin Sr. (Private)	25.80	4-6f	
1989	Sky Jack	Kyle Jack – Kingdom Flower	David Pruhs - Peterborough	26.62	6-1	
1990	Bolt Home	Murlens Slippy – Supreme Peg	Ernie Gaskin Sr. (Private)	26.02	5-1	
1991	Chief Canary	Easy And Slow – Champagne Lady	Kim Marlow (Milton Keynes)	25.77	5-2	
1992	Pineapple Magic	I'm Slippy – Michigan Moira	Michael Compton (Private)	25.80	4-5f	
1993	Gentle Warning	Glen Park Dancer – Gentle Sarah	John McGee Sr. (Reading)	25.76	3-1	
1994	Highway Leader	Leaders Best – Highway Mystery	Michael Bacon (Perry Barr)	25.47	7-4jf	
1995	Gold Buster	Daleys Gold – Spot The Blue	Nigel Saunders (Belle Vue)	25.81	5-1	
1996	Dynamic Fair	Fair Boot – Seventh Dynamic	Patsy Byrne -(Wimbledon)	25.46	6-1	
1997	Dynamic Fair	Fair Boot – Seventh Dynamic	Patsy Byrne (Wimbledon)	25.45	7-2	
1998	Spoonbill Snowey	Right Wish – Clohast Wish	Michael Bacon (Perry Barr)	25.20	4-6f	
2000	Reactabond Rebel	Some Picture – Droopys Larraine	Paul Young (Romford)	25.78	11-10f	
2001	Kinda Magic	Deep Decision - Enchantment	Linda Jones (Walthamstow)	25.52	3-1	
2002	Letter Slippy	Shanless Slippy – Slick City	Patsy Byrne (Wimbledon)	25.57	2-1	
2003	Tims Crow	Lenson Lad – Churchtown Spice	Peter Rich (Romford)	25.59	4-5f	
2004	Run On Trooper	Split the Bill – Oddsonlookon	Mick Mavrias (Sittingbourne)	25.73	6-1	
2005	Fear No One	Toms The Best – Step And Go	Mark Wallis (Walthamstow)	25.41	5-4f	
2006	Too Risky	Daves Mentor – Micks Bozz Lady	Mick Puzey (Walthamstow)	25.66	6-4	
2007	Westmead Prince	Droopys Kewell – Mega Delight	Nick Savva (Private)	25.29	4-5f	
2008	Me Buddy	Ballymac Maeve – Ballymac Peg	Matt Dartnall (Reading)	25.71	2-1f	
2009	Salisman	Droopys Agassi – Droopys Natasha	Julie Calvert (Sunderland)	25.17	6-1	
2010	Lainedans Flyer	Droopys Vieri – Westmead Swift	Paul Young (Romford)	25.26	11-2	
2011	Mountjoy Rock	Black Shaw – Noelles Amarillo	Elaine Parker (Sheffield)	24.88	9-2	Track record
2012	Lil Risky	Ballymac Maeve-Risk The Town	Mark Wallis (Yarmouth)	24.99	7-4f	
2013	Frisby Barney	Head Bound – Airport Boss	David Pruhs - Peterborough	25.69	1-2f	Track record
2017	Hiya Butt	Hondo Black - Hather for Pat	Hayley Keightley (Private)	25.77	1-2f	

(1983-2012 420 metres), (2013-2017 435 metres), (2014-16 & 2018 not held)

=== Peterborough Puppy Derby ===
Year	Winner	Breeding	Trainer	Time	SP	Notes
1992	Bagshot Boozer	I'm Slippy – Pilgrims Joy		25.90		
1993	Sure Fantasy	Phantom Flash – Lively Spark		25.83		
1994	Pams Silver	Skelligs Tiger – Cosy And Warm		25.58		
1995	Slick Mick	Staplers Jo - Aughaderney Mona		25.74		
1996	Spring Gamble	Slaneyside Hare – Spring Season		25.41		
1997	Lenson Billy	Slaneyside Hare – Ballydaly Flyer	Norah McEllistrim (Wimbledon)	25.41	7-2	
1998	Del Piero	Droopys Sandy – Audi Turbo	Linda Mullins (Walthamstow)	25.60	4-5f	
2000	Reactabond Rebel	Some Picture – Droopys Larraine	Paul Young (Romford)	25.49	11-10f	
2001	Reactabond Ace	El Premier – Droopys Kylie	Paul Young (Romford)	25.72	6-1	
2002	Bocelli	Chart King – Minnies Oxana	Dinky Luckhurst (Crayford)	25.41	13-2	
2003	Slinky	Droopys Merson – Kylies Sonia	Paul Young (Romford)	25.89	6-1	
2004	Fire Height Dan	Carlton Bale – September Mist	Mick Puzey (Walthamstow)	25.46	4-5f	
2005	Fear No One	Toms The Best – Step and Go	Mark Wallis (Walthamstow)	25.41	5-4f	
2006	Too Risky	Daves Mentor – Micks Bozz Lady	Mick Puzey (Walthamstow)	25.66	6-4	
2007	Westmead Prince	Droopys Kewell – Mega Delight	Nick Savva (Henlow)	25.29	4-5f	
2008	Me Buddy	Ballymac Maeve – Ballymac Peg	Matt Dartnall (Reading)	25.81	2-1f	
2009	Barnfield Rocky	Hades Rocket – Ballymac Floss	Sam Poots (Private)	25.31	7-2	
2010	Total Reality	Crash – Noirs Magic	John Simpson (Wimbledon)	25.50	5-1	
2011	Monleek Sloopy	Brett Lee – Razldazl Pearl	David Pruhs (Peterborough)	25.44	11-2	
2016	Holdem Rio	Crash - Cornamaddy Maid	Heather Dimmock (Peterborough)	26.24	7-2	

(1992-2011 420 metres), (2016 435 metres), (1999 & 2012–2015, 2017-18 not Run)

== Track records ==
Current

Distance metres	Greyhound	Time	Date	Notes
235	Rotar Wing	13.95	09 Oct 2010	
250	Kooga Kafka	14.80	31 May 2019	
420	Mountjoy Rock	24.88	06 Aug 2011	Peterborough Derby final
435	Kooga Klammer	25.68	18 Oct 2017	
605	Bower Surfer	37.10	12 Sep 2009	Puppy Cesarewitch final
620	Sensual	37.79	23 Nov 2018	
790	Greenacre Lin	49.61	14 May 2005	
805	Romany Rouge	50.68	16 Nov 2016	
975	Jangos Snowdrop	63.15	07 Jun 2008	
420 H	I'm Henry	25.85	17 May 1997	

Previous

Distance metres	Greyhound	Time	Date	Notes
235	Ports Delight	14.46	24 Sep 1983	
235	Small Song	14.44	1989	
235	I'm From Tallow	14.39	18 Jun 1990	
235	Mount Royal Fox	14.31	19 Feb 1995	
235	Razldazl Eddie	14.28	11 Aug 2007	
235	DisBestBoy	14.19	08 Sep 2007	
235	Rotar Wing	14.05	08 Aug 2009	
235	Rotar Wing	13.95	21 Apr 2010	
250	Monleek Town	14.87	27 Feb 2013	
250	Waspinajar	14.85	17 Apr 2013	
250	Scala Rodge	14.85	14 Sep 2018	
420	Siroco	25.68	03 Mar 1984	
420	Bali Hai Chief		10.1984	Fengate Collar final
420	Town View Spring	25.58	29 Apr 1986	
420	Slippy King	25.51	21 Jul 1990	
420	Daleys Whisper	25.51	12 Oct 1990	
420	Highway Leader	25.15	30 Jul 1994	
420	Westmead Logan	25.15	24 Apr 2009	
420	Little Sensation	25.05	28 Jul 2010	Peterborough Derby Heats
420	Fancy Socks	25.02	23 Apr 2011	Peterborough Derby semi-final
435	Frisby Barney	25.99	27 Mar 2013	
435	Ramodi	25.97	17 Apr 2013	
435	Bay City Impact	25.95	22 May 2013	
435	Frisby Barney	25.69	03 Aug 2013	Peterborough Derby Final
605	Decoy Lassie	37.71	04 Apr 1985	
605	My Boy Mac	37.51	17 Mar 1990	
605	Simply Free	37.24	12 Sep 1994	
605	Glencoes Tom	37.11	09 Apr 2002	
620	Ballymac Eliza	38.03	28 Oct 2017	
790	Aidans Choice	50.32	27 Sep 1983	
790	Gold Sash	50.24	04 Sep 1989	
790	Poor Sue	50.21	26 Jun 1991	
790	Poor Sue	50.10	01 Jul 1991	
790	Fortunate Man	49.66	15 Jun 1992	
805	Rearguard Bond	51.36	01 Nov 2014	
975	Red Boss	64.08	19 Oct 1987	
975	Lenas Cadet	63.30	19 Nov 1988	
420 H	Gis A Smile	25.90	27 Jun 1994	
