= 1997 English Greyhound Derby =

- Location: Wimbledon Stadium
- End date: 28 June
- Total prize money: £50,000 (winner)

The 1997 Daily Mirror/Sporting Life Greyhound Derby took place during May & June with the final being held on 28 June 1997 at Wimbledon Stadium. The winner Some Picture received £50,000. The competition was sponsored by the Sporting Life and Daily Mirror.

== Final result ==
At Wimbledon (over 480 metres):

Position	Name of Greyhound	Breeding	Trap	Sectional	SP	Time	Trainer
1st	Some Picture	Slaneyside Hare - Spring Season	6	5.12	8-13f	28.23	Charlie Lister (Nottingham)
2nd	He Knows	Polnoon Chief - Polnoon Lane	4	5.23	3-1	28.73	Barrie Draper (Sheffield)
3rd	Stows Val	Slaneyside Hare - I Know You	3	5.06	10-1	28.77	Linda Mullins (Walthamstow)
4th	Annies Bullet	Slippys Quest - O Hickey Kylie	5		7-1	29.07	Nick Savva (Walthamstow)
5th	Charpaidon	Cravencottage UK - Kildare Raven	1		33-1	29.09	Sam Sykes (Wimbledon)
6th	Heres Andy	Polnoon Chief - Minnies Nikita	2		7-1	29.33	Paul Stringer (Private)

=== Distances ===
6¼, ½, 3¾, head, 3 (lengths)
The distances between the greyhounds are in finishing order and shown in lengths. One length is equal to 0.08 of one second.

=== Race Report ===
Some Picture the recent Scottish Greyhound Derby champion remained unbeaten going into the final. Three greyhounds broke well out of the traps, they were Stows Val, Annies Bullet and Some Picture but as they came to the first bend Annies Bullet was squeezed out and lost all chance of winning. Some Picture and Stows Val led around the first two bends well clear of the pack but the Charlie Lister trained black dog forged ahead down the back straight leading to an comfortable victory. He Knows made up good ground to finish runner up. The winning time was a very fast 28.23 sec, the fastest time ever for a Wimbledon Derby final, and just two spots outside Greenane Squire's rack record.

== Quarter finals ==
Heat 1 (Jun 17)
Pos	Name	SP	Time
1st	Lenson Billy	9-4	28.98
2nd	Midway Sweep	20-1	29.08
3rd	Annies Bullet	2-1f	29.28
4th	Nashoba	8-1	29.49
5th	Powys Prince	9-4	29.52
6th	Countrywide Stag	25-1	29.72

Heat 2 (Jun 17)
Pos	Name	SP	Time
1st	Some Picture	4-7f	28.83
2nd	Stows Val	33-1	28.86
3rd	Capital Cee	7-1	28.91
4th	Corpo Election	14-1	29.05
5th	Saradeb	6-1	29.13
6th	Ladbrook Park	9-2	29.20

Heat 3 (Jun 17)
Pos	Name	SP	Time
1st	Charpaidon	20-1	28.91
2nd	Forest Jet	6-1	29.20
3rd	Airmount Jeff	8-1	29.24
4th	Eagle Boy	5-1	29.34
5th	Astrosyn Eulogy	5-4f	29.45
6th	Im Trigo	9-4	29.65

Heat 4 (Jun 17)
Pos	Name	SP	Time
1st	Toms The Best	9-2	28.41
2nd	He Knows	6-4f	28.90
3rd	Heres Andy	4-1	29.08
4th	You Will Call	5-1	29.25
5th	Cool Dynamite	66-1	29.50
6th	Pavilion Rock	5-1	dnf

== Semi finals ==
First Semi Final (Jun 21)
Pos	Name of Greyhound	SP	Time
1st	Some Picture	4-7f	28.60
2nd	Stows Val	9-2	29.10
3rd	Charpaidon	14-1	29.12
4th	Forest Jet	8-1	29.23
5th	Midway Sweep	14-1	29.25
6th	Capital Cee	4-1	29.29

Second Semi Final (Jun 21)
Pos	Name of Greyhound	SP	Time
1st	Annies Bullet	12-1	28.84
2nd	He Knows	7-4	28.90
3rd	Heres Andy	6-1	29.24
4th	Toms The Best	5-4f	29.29
5th	Airmount Jet	20-1	29.42
6th	Lenson Billy	8-1	29.51

== See also ==
- 1997 UK & Ireland Greyhound Racing Year
