= 1997 UK & Ireland Greyhound Racing Year =

The 1997 UK & Ireland Greyhound Racing Year was the 72nd year of greyhound racing in the United Kingdom and the 71st year of greyhound racing in Ireland.

== Roll of honour ==
Major Winners
Award	Name of Winner
1997 English Greyhound Derby	Some Picture
1997 Irish Greyhound Derby	Toms The Best
1997 Scottish Greyhound Derby	Some Picture
Greyhound Trainer of the Year	Linda Mullins
Greyhound of the Year	Some Picture
Irish Dog and Bitch of the Year	Some Picture / Borna Best
Trainers Championship	Linda Mullins

== Summary ==
The National Greyhound Racing Club (NGRC) released the annual returns, with totalisator turnover at £73,754,098 and attendances recorded at 3,523,900 from 5412 meetings.

Some Picture trained by Charlie Lister was voted Greyhound of the Year after winning the 1997 English Greyhound Derby and the 1997 Scottish Greyhound Derby in addition to reaching the 1997 Irish Greyhound Derby final. The black dog was also voted the leading dog in Ireland and won the Irish Dog of the Year and only just missed out on a £100,000 bonus prize offered by sponsors Regal to any greyhound winning the Scottish, English and Irish Derby.

Linda Mullins won the Greyhound Trainer of the Year for the second successive year.

== Tracks ==
The year started badly when on 4 January the London Stadium closed its doors. The stadium had been rebuilt had huge cost and was now subject to rumours of fraud and malpractice. The reasons for administration was subject to investigation and even appeared on 'The Cook Report', a popular TV show hosted by Roger Cook.

On 27 October Eastville Stadium owned by the BS Group was sold for development, plans were announced for a new Bristol greyhound stadium that never came to fruition. The BS Group management switched the entire operation, including trainers, racing office staff and bookmakers forty miles up the M4 to the newly acquired Abbey Stadium, bought from British Car Auctions who had owned the track since 1983, even the Bookmakers Afternoon Greyhound Service (BAGS) contract switched to Swindon. Bristol trainers Terry Kibble, Ron Dix, Marjorie Millard and Peter Swadden all moved Swindon.

The racing ended at Dunmore Stadium in March 1997 and the last meeting attracted 3,000 patrons.

== News ==
Catford Racing Manager Jim Snowden left to be General Manager at Portsmouth replacing the retiring Bill Francis. Snowden was replaced by the Assistant Racing Manager Phil Donaldson. In Wimbledon the Merton council produced a feasibility study into putting a football stadium on Wimbledon Stadium which was dismissed by Wimbledon chairman Sam Hammam. A first season trainer called Seamus Cahill joined Catford.

== Competitions ==
The BBC severed their ties with greyhound racing as they continued to cut their sporting programs. Sky stepped in and would show the TV Trophy for the first time which led to the bizarre scenario whereby the event was held twice; once in April (BBC) and then again in October (Sky). The relationship with Sky was closely guarded by the Greyhound Racing Association who gained the upper hand in negotiations for the industry.

Derby semi-finalist Toms The Best hit a great run of form in the summer winning the Midland Gold Cup at Monmore and the Sussex Cup at Hove before heading for the Irish Derby and claiming the competition for Nick Savva.

Spring Rose continued to perform well, reaching the Grand Prix final at Walthamstow and St Leger final at Wembley but she was upstaged by Tralee Crazy. The white and black bitch trained by Nick Savva won both the Cesarewitch at Catford and the St Leger.

Sheffield (71 points) won the Red Mills Supertrack defeating Walthamstow (64) and Midlenhall (54) in the final.

== Principal UK races ==
Daily Mirror/Sporting Life Grand National, Hall Green (Mar 26, 474m h, £7,500)
Pos	Name of Greyhound	Trainer	SP	Time	Trap
1st	Tarn Bay Flash	Pat McCombe	9-1	29.07	5
2nd	Dynamic Display	Barry O'Sullivan	8-1	29.17	1
3rd	Scalp Ranger	Sam Sykes	25-1	29.23	3
4th	Wisley Wonder	Lorraine King	1-1f	29.31	2
5th	Glown Fox	Tom Foster	11-4	29.49	4
6th	Springwell Boost	Nikki Chambers	5-1	29.97	6

BBC TV Trophy, Hall Green (Apr 9, 815m, £6,000)
Pos	Name of Greyhound	Trainer	SP	Time	Trap
1st	Thornfield Pride	Yvonne Morris	12-1	52.17	5
2nd	Elbony Rose	Nick Savva	1-1f	52.18	2
3rd	Handy Score	Ernie Gaskin Sr.	8-1	52.19	4
4th	Wise Beauty	Patsy Byrne	4-1	52.33	1
5th	Musical Treat	Brian Clemenson	10-1	52.49	3
6th	Frisby Fanfare	Harry Crapper	5-1	52.99	6

Regal Scottish Derby, Shawfield (Apr 26, 480m, £20,000)
Pos	Name of Greyhound	Trainer	SP	Time	Trap
1st	Some Picture	Charlie Lister	1-1f	29.02	5
2nd	Elderberry Chick	Pat Ryan	4-1	29.36	3
3rd	Endon Tiger	Charlie Lister	4-1	29.37	4
4th	Quick Tune	Gordon Hodson	8-1	29.49	6
5th	Airmount Jeff	Charlie Lister	3-1	29.57	2
6th	Donnas Dancer	Mrs S J Douglas	25-1	29.61	1

Reading Masters, Reading (May 11, 465m, £20,000)
Pos	Name of Greyhound	Trainer	SP	Time	Trap
1st	Night Trooper	Nikki Adams	6-1	27.86	3
2nd	Blackwater Storm	A E Lindsay	14-1	28.42	2
3rd	Blue Murlen	Mick Smith	4-9f	28.45	4
4th	Final Climber	Tony Meek	25-1	28.51	5
5th	Droopys Eric	Henry Tasker	6-1	28.59	1
6th	Smart Dog	Brian Clemenson	14-1	30.99	6

B.T Global Finance Scurry Gold Cup, Catford (Jul 12, 385m, £2,500)
Pos	Name of Greyhound	Trainer	SP	Time	Trap
1st	Shoreham Beach	Diane Stinchcombe	10-1	23.78	5
2nd	Black Gem Charm	Phil Rees Jr.	4-1	23.82	2
3rd	Small Fortune	John Coleman	5-1	23.83	6
4th	Pavilion Rock	Sam Sykes	11-8f	23.95	1
5th	Stows Val	Linda Mullins	11-4	24.07	3
6th	Official Figure	Graham Holland	28-1	24.27	4

BT Global Finance Syntegra Gold Collar, Catford (Sep 20, 555m, £7,500)
Pos	Name of Greyhound	Trainer	SP	Time	Trap
1st	Lenson Billy	Norah McEllistrim	1-2f	35.02	3
2nd	Homeside Knight	Tom Gates	6-1	35.10	4
3rd	Slow Jo	John Coleman	6-1	35.26	6
4th	Charpaidon	Sam Sykes	20-1	35.30	2
5th	Derrinasafa Dan	Alf Ellis	16-1	35.31	1
6th	Alastairs Effort	Terry Atkins	12-1	35.41	5

Laurent-Perrier Grand Prix, Walthamstow (Oct 4, 640m, £7,500)
Pos	Name of Greyhound	Trainer	SP	Time	Trap
1st	El Grand Senor	Linda Mullins	12-1	39.38	2
2nd	Spring Rose	Charlie Lister	4-6f	39.56	5
3rd	Slaney Ash	Pam Cross	8-1	39.62	3
4th	Lydpal Frankie	Tony Meek	4-1	39.78	1
5th	Wandering One	Derek Knight	8-1	39.84	6
6th	Lisnakill Lodge	John Faint	20-1	40.14	4

Ike Morris Laurels, Wimbledon (Oct 10, 460m, £7,500)
Pos	Name of Greyhound	Trainer	SP	Time	Trap
1st	El Premier	Linda Mullins	4-7f	27.36	6
2nd	Black Gem Charm	Phil Rees Jr.	8-1	27.62	3
3rd	Pingo	Seamus Cahill	6-1	27.76	4
4th	Run Freddie	Tommy Foster	25-1	27.92	2
5th	Coilltes Choice	Macmorough Mulkerrin	20-1	28.00	5
6th	Big Mistake	John Coleman	4-1	28.30	1

Evening Standard TV Trophy, Wimbledon (Oct 28, 815m, £6,000)
Pos	Name of Greyhound	Trainer	SP	Time	Trap
1st	Moanrue Slippy	Kelly Rockman	51.35	5-1	6
2nd	Maid of Seskin	Brian Clemenson	51.38	5-1	1
3rd	Lady Flyaway	Brian Clemenson	51.54	2-1jf	5
4th	Tralee Crazy	Nick Savva	51.58	2-1jf	3
5th	Marys Gem	Mark Lavender	51.82	14-1	4
6th	Denise Dream	Ernie Gaskin Sr.	51.90	20-1	2

Wendy Fair St Leger, Wembley (Nov 14, 655m, £12,000)
Pos	Name of Greyhound	Trainer	SP	Time	Trap
1st	Tralee Crazy	Nick Savva	4-1	39.41	5
2nd	Lydpal Frankie	Tony Meek	6-1	39.61	3
3rd	Faultless Fred	Gloria Stringer	20-1	40.05	2
4th	Mystery Player	Sam Sykes	33-1	40.19	6
5th	Spring Rose	Charlie Lister	1-2f	40.31	4
6th	Weeford Carol	John Lambe	50-1	40.33	1

William Hill Cesarewitch, Catford (Dec 6, 718m, £6,500)
Pos	Name of Greyhound	Trainer	SP	Time	Trap
1st	Tralee Crazy	Nick Savva	1-2f	45.69	4
2nd	Dunmurry Flight	Ernie Gaskin Sr.	10-1	46.15	5
3rd	Musical Treat	Brian Clemenson	10-1	46.27	1
4th	Elderberry Flyer	Pat Ryan	16-1	46.31	6
5th	Hasty Bit	Paul Young	50-1	46.55	2
6th	Baby Grand	Norah McEllistrim	4-1	46.59	3

Thoroughbred Investments Oaks, Wimbledon (Dec 13, 480m, £6,000)
Pos	Name of Greyhound	Trainer	SP	Time	Trap
1st	Flashy Get	Ernie Gaskin Sr.	14-1	28.75	1
2nd	Seskin Judy	Angie Kibble	10-1	28.87	2
3rd	Cashen Sleeper	John McGee Jr.	20-1	28.99	6
4th	Frankion Jacky	Linda Jones	1-1f	29.01	5
5th	Be Bopa Lola	Phil Rees Jr.	6-1	29.17	3
N/R	Terrydrum Kate	Charlie Lister			

== Totalisator returns ==
Extended content

The totalisator returns declared to the National Greyhound Racing Club for the year 1997 are listed below.

Stadium	Turnover £
London (Walthamstow)	11,493,136
London (Wimbledon)	8,081,088
Romford	6,515,458
Brighton & Hove	4,640,284
Birmingham (Hall Green)	4,471,132
Manchester (Belle Vue)	4,388,067
London (Catford)	3,661,680
Sheffield (Owlerton)	2,553,582
Birmingham (Perry Barr)	2,483,949
Crayford	2,446,291
Peterborough	2,203,740
Sunderland	1,982,214

Stadium	Turnover £
London (Wembley)	1,867,544
Milton Keynes	1,713,564
Wolverhampton (Monmore)	1,677,520
Glasgow (Shawfield)	1,618,461
Portsmouth	1,357,318
Newcastle (Brough Park)	1,311,308
Yarmouth	1,297,701
Nottingham	1,237,500
Reading	1,166,274
Oxford	1,114,841
Harlow	733,471
Canterbury	707,236

Stadium	Turnover £
Bristol	677,226
Poole	515,781
Swindon	508,826
Hull (New Craven Park)	490,250
Swaffham	199,447
Mildenhall	186,876
Henlow (Bedfordshire)	165,358
Doncaster (Stainforth)	123,975
Sittingbourne	85,000
Rye House	78,000
