= 1995 UK & Ireland Greyhound Racing Year =

The 1995 UK & Ireland Greyhound Racing Year was the 70th year of greyhound racing in the United Kingdom and the 69th year of greyhound racing in Ireland.

== Roll of honour ==
Major Winners
Award	Name of Winner
1995 English Greyhound Derby	Moaning Lad
1995 Irish Greyhound Derby	Batties Rocket
1995 Scottish Greyhound Derby	Solar Symphony
Greyhound Trainer of the Year	John Coleman
Greyhound of the Year	Staplers Jo
Irish Greyhound of the Year	Dew Reward
Trainers Championship	John Coleman

== Summary ==
The National Greyhound Racing Club (NGRC) released the annual returns, with totalisator turnover at £77,837,828 and attendances recorded at 3,652,671 from 6391 meetings.

Staplers Jo trained by Nick Savva was voted Greyhound of the Year after winning the Anglo Irish International, Produce Stakes, Guineas and Ladbrokes Puppy Derby. Dew Reward trained by Michael O'Donovan was voted Irish Greyhound of the Year after winning the Irish Champion Stakes.

John Coleman won the Greyhound Trainer of the Year.

While William Hill remained part of the doomed Brent Walker, the new owners of Hackney Wick Stadium Fleetfoot Racing (led by its Managing Director Ex-Lloyds broker and racing journalist Robert Parker) had announced an exciting redevelopment plan. However, before the end of the year the plans had turned into a fiasco. Work began on an ambitious project including a £12 million restaurant and state of the art facilities, leading trainers were recruited and the stadium was rebranded 'The London Stadium'. Robert Parker was later replaced by Stephen Rea, with the venture still requiring significant funds and beset with construction problems and internal disagreements the original £14 million scheme to develop the neglected stadium had run into serious problems. Extra cash was raised by rights issues with companies including Rothschild, Henderson Venture Managers and Samuel Montagu. In October 1995 the new stadium was finally ready offering first-class facilities and significantly high prize money. However, on the reopening night and despite a capacity crowd the stadium went into receivership during the same evening. Investigations began amidst rumours of fraud, banker Stephen Welton, was pursued by LWT reporter Trevor Phillips and questioned for the Board's failure to conduct due diligence on a prospective buyer who turned out to be an undischarged bankrupt. Parker appeared on Roger Cook's ITV's television program The Cook Report and allegations were made against Stephen Rea.

== Tracks ==
Construction company Hawkins of Harrow went into administration following a lull in the building industry and repayments required to the banks for loans to purchase garden centres. They owned Northern Sports which meant that Oxford Stadium and Ramsgate Stadium were in the hands of the receivers. Ramsgate boss Sheila Yanez believes the track could be sold for £1.2 million but that it would take at least a year to resolve planning issues with the neighbouring garden centre. Oxford General Manager John Blake and Northern Sports Group Racing Manager Mick Wheble were made redundant.

Harlow Stadium opened on 15 March. Toni Nicholls bought the land from receivers when the new football stadium was being built in 1993 and constructed the new facilities including executive suites, a restaurant and conference and banqueting facilities.

Sittingbourne opened on 3 October with new facilities including a track side restaurant, fast food outlets, three licensed bars and three private executive suites.

Eddie Ramsay's SGRC (Scottish Greyhound Racing Company) was in financial difficulties and he sold Powderhall Stadium to a Channel Islands company called Charlotte Twenty-One (that included a shareholder called Walton Hankinson, a housing development specialist).

== News ==
Treacys Triumph broke one of the oldest track records in Ireland after recording 31.68 at Harolds Cross for 580 yards. The half brother of Moral Standards improved Rail Ship's previous record set in 1973.

== Competitions ==
Spring Rose trained by Charlie Lister finished second behind Elliots Gem in the inaugural Puppy Classic at Nottingham. Spring Rose, a white and fawn bitch would make a champion stayer. It was however Ballarue Minx trained by Bill Masters that was the stand out stayer of the year; the white and brindle bitch won the first Cesarewitch to be held at Catford Stadium, which added to her St Leger crown from the previous year.

== Principal UK races ==
Daily Mirror/Sporting Life Grand National, Hall Green (Mar 29, 474m h, £7,500)
Pos	Name of Greyhound	Trainer	SP	Time	Trap
1st	Elegant Brandy	Ernie Gaskin Sr.	10-1	29.24	1
2nd	Fear Faire	Kim Marlow	5-2	29.26	3
3rd	Howling Darkie	Bob Baker	16-1	29.40	6
4th	Ace Choice	Derek Knight	7-1	29.58	5
5th	Flicks Flyer	Patsy Byrne	11-4	29.59	2
6th	Westlake Wonder	Chris Duggan	2-1f	29.67	4

BBC TV Trophy, Oxford (Apr 19, 845m, £6,000)
Pos	Name of Greyhound	Trainer	SP	Time	Trap
1st	Last Action	John Wileman	10-11f	53.68	5
2nd	Jubilee Rebecca	Gordon Rooks	8-1	53.86	3
3rd	Tain Flip	David Mullins	11-2	53.87	2
4th	Long Island Jim	Chris Duggan	11-2	53.91	6
5th	Coalbrook Star	Ken Shearman	8-1	54.19	1
6th	Aughadonagh Bay	Bob Hall	50-1	54.51	4

Reading Masters, Reading (May 11, 465m, £20,000)
Pos	Name of Greyhound	Trainer	SP	Time	Trap
1st	Longvalley Manor	John Coleman	9-2	28.35	
2nd	Sodas Slippy	D Barrett	8-1	28.49	2
3rd	Tooting Tim	Patsy Byrne	16-1	28.89	5
4th	Strauss	Gilly Davis	9-2	28.92	3
5th	Academic	John Coleman	6-4f	00.00	1
6th	Seal of Gold	Patsy Byrne	5-2	DNF	6

Regal Scottish Derby, Shawfield (May 20, 480m, £20,000)
Pos	Name of Greyhound	Trainer	SP	Time	Trap
1st	Solar Symphony	Stuart Ray	5-2jf	28.97+	1
2nd	Curryhills Fancy	Linda Mullins	6-1	29.33	6
3rd	Pond Pythagarus	Harry Williams	10-1	29.34	5
4th	West End	Graham Calvert	4-1	29.46	3
5th	Cill Dubh Sam	Hazel Dickson	6-1	29.82	2
6th	Murlens Link	Davie Neill	5-2jf	30.12	4

+Track Record

Scurry Gold Cup, Catford (Jul 8, 385m, £2,500)
Pos	Name of Greyhound	Trainer	SP	Time	Trap
1st	Demesne Bear	Peter Payne	10-11f	23.68	1
2nd	City Class	John Wileman	4-1	23.86	6
3rd	Ramor Treasure	Paul Garland	25-1	24.04	4
4th	Tamar Wizard	Brian Clemenson	14-1	24.16	2
5th	Hello October	Tom Gates	9-4	24.24	5
6th	Hendon Charlie	Norah McEllistrim	25-1	24.32	3

Gold Collar, Catford (Sep 23, 555m, £7,500)
Pos	Name of Greyhound	Trainer	SP	Time	Trap
1st	Alans Rose	John Coleman	11-10f	34.61	1
2nd	Coom Cruiser	Derek Knight	3-1	34.77	3
3rd	Coolmona Road	Derek Knight	2-1	34.91	4
4th	Mr Tan	Dave Catchpole	20-1	34.95	2
5th	Fulham Cross	John Walsh	14-1	35.11	6
6th	Opening Quote	Donna Pickett	25-1	35.29	5

Grand Prix, Walthamstow (Oct 7, 640m, £7,500)
Pos	Name of Greyhound	Trainer	SP	Time	Trap
1st	Suncrest Sail	Charlie Lister	11-10f	39.62	
2nd	Sir Frederick	Derek Knight	5-1	39.78	6
3rd	Love of You	Tom Foster	7-1	39.81	3
4th	Alans Rose	John Coleman	5-2	39.99	4
5th	Just Ash	Graham Sharp	66-1	40.39	2
6th	Honest Endeavour	Dick Hawkes	100-1	40.44	5

Laurels, Wimbledon (Oct 14, 460m, £7,500)
Pos	Name of Greyhound	Trainer	SP	Time	Trap
1st	Demesne Bear	Peter Payne	14-1	27.94	
2nd	Dragon Prince	Charlie Lister	4-5f	28.08	3
3rd	Hart To Mine	Brian Clemenson	12-1	28.36	5
4th	Bettys Wish	John Wileman	20-1	28.38	4
5th	Hinch Manx	Patsy Byrne	5-2	28.52	6
6th	Top Lodge	Terry Kibble	14-1	28.72	1

St Leger, Wembley (Nov 17, 655m, £12,000)
Pos	Name of Greyhound	Trainer	SP	Time	Trap
1st	Kens Dilemma	Theo Mentzis	2-1f	39.80	6
2nd	Dinan Wonder	Charlie Lister	9-4	39.84	2
3rd	Misties Cloud	Hazel Dickson	7-2	39.92	4
4th	Milwaukee Dream	Ernie Gaskin Sr.	7-1	39.94	3
5th	Andronikos	Cindy Clapp	12-1	40.10	5
6th	Slippy Ted	Graham Sharp	14-1	40.24	1

Cesarewitch, Catford (Dec 2, 718m, £5,000)
Pos	Name of Greyhound	Trainer	SP	Time	Trap
1st	Ballarue Minx	Bill Masters	5-4	45.98	3
2nd	Alans Rose	John Coleman	5-6f	45.99	1
3rd	Postal Delivery	Tony Taylor	50-1	46.35	5
4th	Musha	Dennis Jewell	50-1	46.36	2
5th	Rockmount Grand	Tony Taylor	8-1	46.38	6
6th	Whos Minnies	Lorraine Sams	40-1	46.62	4

Oaks, Wimbledon (Dec 16, 480m, £6,000)
Pos	Name of Greyhound	Trainer	SP	Time	Trap
1st	Saddlers Return	Ernie Gaskin Sr.	3-1	28.76	2
2nd	Forgotten	John Haynes	8-11f	29.12	6
3rd	Bettys Wish	John Wileman	5-1	29.14	1
4th	Veras Echo	Tommy Foster	50-1	29.64	4
5th	Courage Queen	Tommy Foster	7-1	29.70	3
6th	Good Omen	Ernie Gaskin Sr.	12-1	29.82	5

== Totalisator returns ==
Extended content

The totalisator returns declared to the National Greyhound Racing Club for the year 1995 are listed below.

Stadium	Turnover £
London (Walthamstow)	12,419,527
London (Wimbledon)	8,572,980
Romford	5,966,799
Brighton & Hove	4,802,685
Birmingham (Hall Green)	4,729,378
London (Catford)	4,618,210
Manchester (Belle Vue)	4,224,570
London (Wembley)	2,662,131
Crayford	2,575,528
Sheffield (Owlerton)	2,284,595
Birmingham (Perry Barr)	2,222,567
Peterborough	1,950,844
Glasgow (Shawfield)	1,851,797

Stadium	Turnover £
Sunderland	1,624,156
London (Hackney)	1,599,182
Wolverhampton (Monmore)	1,481,070
Portsmouth	1,424,206
Oxford	1,288,604
Yarmouth	1,253,082
Bristol	1,213,568
Newcastle (Brough Park)	1,196,826
Reading	1,083,871
Ramsgate	997,166
Nottingham	698,649
Milton Keynes	696,937
Swindon]	564,897

Stadium	Turnover £
Doncaster (Stainforth)	551,970
Bolton	511,240
Hull (New Craven Park)	402,312
Harlow	390,000
Canterbury	389,645
Sittingbourne	340,441
Middlesbrough	326,786
Swaffham	308,010
Henlow (Bedfordshire)	237,462
Mildenhall	176,598
Rye House	174,659
Dundee	23,880
