= Toms The Best =

Racing greyhound

- Sire: Frightful Flash
- Dam: Ladys Guest
- Sex: Dog
- Whelped: June 1995
- Died: 2008 (aged 13)
- Color: Black
- Breeder: Ian Greaves
- Owner: Eddie Shotton
- Trainer: Nick Savva

Other awards
- 1998 Greyhound of the Year

Honours
- 1997 Irish Greyhound Derby champion 1998 English Greyhound Derby champion

Toms The Best was a leading racing greyhound during the 1990s. He is the only greyhound to have won both the English Greyhound Derby and the Irish Greyhound Derby. He was also voted the 1998 UK Greyhound of the Year.

== Whelping and rearing ==
He was whelped in June 1995, from a mating between Frightful Flash and Ladys Guest. He was bred by Ian Greaves at Monasterevin.

== Racing ==
=== 1997 ===
After winning a race at Shelbourne Park he was purchased by Eddie Shotton for £10,000 and sent to trainer Nick Savva at Walthamstow Stadium. The black dog was aimed at the 1997 English Greyhound Derby after just seven UK races (one of which resulted in a steward's inquiry for time finding in a graded race). He performed well during the Derby, progressing to the semi-finals before being knocked out and won the Consolation on final night.

After the Derby he won the Midland Gold Cup at Monmore and the Sussex Cup at Hove, before heading for the 1997 Irish Greyhound Derby. He progressed through the rounds and won the final, a race that included his great rival Some Picture and became the first English winner since Sole Aim in 1971.

=== 1998 ===
The main target was the 1998 English Greyhound Derby but before the event started in May he reached the finals of the Blue Riband and Scottish Greyhound Derby. Then he headed for the Derby at Wimbledon Stadium and became the first greyhound in history to win both the Irish and English Derby.

He was retired after winning 21 of his 40 races and earned over £115,000 in prize money and was voted 1998 Greyhound of the Year.

== Legacy ==
He was a successful sire at stud, siring many top open racers until he died in 2008, aged 13 at the Savva kennels.

== Pedigree ==
Tangaloa
Eaglehawk Star
Country Coast
Frightful Flash
Chariot Supreme
Leggy Waitress
Petite Allira
Toms The Best
Im Slippy
Slippys Quest
Pretty Special
Ladys Guest
Whisper Wishes
Yale Princess
Saga Miss
