= Some Picture =

Racing greyhound (w. 1994)

- Sire: Slaneyside Hare
- Dam: Spring Season
- Sex: Dog
- Whelped: 2 June 1994
- Died: 15 April 1999
- Color: Black
- Breeder: Theresa Hamill
- Owner: Stephen Spiteri
- Trainer: Charlie Lister O.B.E

Other awards
- 1997 Greyhound of the Year; 1997 Irish Greyhound of the Year

Honours
- 1997 English Greyhound Derby champion 1997 Scottish Greyhound Derby champion

Some Picture was a leading racing greyhound during the 1990s. He won both the English Greyhound Derby and the Scottish Greyhound Derby. He was also voted the 1997 UK Greyhound of the Year and unusually for an English trained greyhound was voted 1997 Irish Greyhound of the Year, being Irish bred.

== Whelping and rearing ==
He was whelped on 2 June 1995, from a mating between Slaneyside Hare and Spring Season. He was bred by Theresa Hamill.

== Racing ==
=== 1996 ===
He won the Eclipse at Nottingham and the Select Stakes at Wembley. The performances were good enough for many to consider him a leading prospect for the English Greyhound Derby the following year.

=== 1997 ===
In April he was aimed at the first major Derby of the year, the 1997 Regal Scottish Greyhound Derby and won the event earning the first prize of £20,000 for owner Steve Spiteri. The success propelled him into favouritism for the 1997 English Greyhound Derby and was looking to become the first Scottish Derby champion since Patricias Hope (1972) to successfully double up.

The black dog breezed through the competition remained going unbeaten into the final. As the only wide runner in the final he took a decisive lead on the second bend to win a first Derby for his trainer Charlie Lister. The time of 28.23 was the fastest time ever for a Wimbledon Stadium Derby final.

After a short break he travelled to Ireland and Shelbourne Park, in an attempt to become the first greyhound in history to achieve the modern triple crown (Irish Derby instead of Welsh Greyhound Derby). Some Picture was ante post favourite for the 1997 Irish Greyhound Derby and after five races (two heat wins and a further three heats where he was defeated but earned a qualifying place) he lined up for the final. The dream ended (and a £100,000 bonus was lost) after he was slow away and tangled with Spiral Nikita; his great English rival Toms The Best won the final. It transpired that his trainer Charlie Lister had battled with his fitness throughout the competition after Some Picture had been off colour during the event.

His connections decided to send him for stud duties, and he retired at a young age. He also died at a young age from a suspected heart attack on 15 April 1999.

== Legacy ==
He was a successful sire at stud, siring many top open racers but his premature death probably stopped him becoming one of the most successful sires of all time.

== Pedigree ==
Bold Work
Skelligs Tiger
Lemon Soda
Slaneyside Hare
The Other Duke
Slaneyside Queen
Sand Princess
Some Picture
Oran Jack
Kyle Jack
Lady Barbra
Spring Season
Sand Man
Wilton Cross
Floras Bar
