= Mark Wallis =

British greyhound racing professional trainer

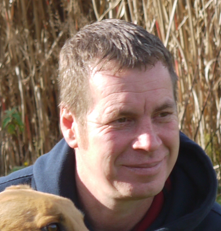

Personal information
- Born: 1964 (age 61–62)
- Occupation: Greyhound trainer

Sport
- Sport: Greyhound racing

Achievements and titles
- National finals: Derby wins: English Derby (2009, 2012); Classic/Feature wins: St Leger (2009, 2011, 2012, 2016, 2017, 2025); Cesarewitch (2020, 2024, 2025, 2026); Grand National (2005, 2014, 2018); Oaks (2014, 2015); Grand Prix (2006); Golden Jacket (2014, 2016, 2026); Television Trophy (2012, 2019, 2020, 2021, 2025); Scurry Gold Cup (2022, 2023); ARC Grand Prix (2011, 2013, 2018, 2023, 2025); William Hill Classic (2009, 2011); Champion Stakes (2007, 2015, 2018, 2019, 2024, 2025); Essex Vase (2006, 2007, 2013, 2015, 2021, 2023); Olympic (2017, 2024, 2025); Regency (2011, 2016, 2019, 2021, 2025); Sussex Cup (2021, 2025); East Anglian Derby (2021, 2022); Golden Sprint (2012, 2017, 2022, 2025); Coronation Cup (2014, 2017, 2020, 2023, 2024, 2025); Kent St Leger (2019, 2021, 2024); Juvenile (2025); Stayers Classic (2009, 2016, 2025); Eclipse (2025)

Mark Andrew Wallis (born 1964) is an English greyhound trainer. He is a record 16-times UK champion Greyhound Trainer of the Year.

== Profile ==
In 1990, Wallis joined leading trainer Linda Jones at the Imperial Kennels (Linda would later become his mother-in-law). The kennel gained significant success during the following 15 years.

In 2005 he became a trainer in his own right taking over the Imperial Kennels from Linda Jones. Patrick Janssens was a kennelhand for Wallis from 2005-2014. Wallis secured the trainers title in his first year of training and won his first major competition (the Grand National). The kennel continued to gain success and won numerous events culminating in the 2009 English Greyhound Derby crown. A second Derby triumph ensued when he won the 2012 English Greyhound Derby with Blonde Snapper.

He currently runs out of Henlow Stadium which he joined in August 2018, from his Lakenheath Kennels. Previously he was attached to Walthamstow Stadium until it closed and then Harlow Stadium until July 2010 when he left for Yarmouth Stadium, in order for his greyhounds being schooled behind a Swaffham hare. He then joined Towcester Greyhound Stadium when it opened in 2014 and stayed there until it closed during 2018.

Major wins in 2019 included the TV Trophy, Regency, Champion Stakes and Kent St Leger and the following year in 2020 he won the Cesarewitch (held for the first time in eight years). By the end of 2020 his eight year reign as trainer of the year came to an end at the hands of his former pupil Patrick Janssens. However during the year he still secured the prestigious Cesarewitch and a second successive TV Trophy, both won by Aayamza Royale. Aayamza Royale (a black bitch) was then voted the 2020 Greyhound of the Year.

In January 2021, he won the Essex Vase for a record fifth time and in May, Aayamza Royal became the fourth greyhound to win the TV Trophy twice, setting a record of fours wins for Wallis in the process. Wallis duly secured a 12th and 13th Greyhound Trainer of the Year title at the end of 2021 & 2022 respectively.

Wallis joined Mildenhall Stadium known as Suffolk Downs in 2023 and went on to win a 14th trainer's title after recording 1591 points. Wallis duly won a 15th title by the end of 2024, helped by three category one wins during one evening alone on 14 December.

After changing his track attachment status to private, Wallis continued his domination into 2025, winning both the Cesarewitch and Blue Riband in January, the former with Garfiney Blaze again. This was followed by the TV Trophy (Mongys Wild) and Golden Sprint in March and a fifth Trainers Championship, held at Perry Barr on 29 March. The successes during 2025 continued with New Destiny winning the Grand Prix and Champion Stakes and Proper Heiress winning six titles including the Juvenile, Eclipse and Olympic.

AFter securing trainer's title number 16, he started 2026 with a third consecutive Cesarewitch victory courtesy of Mongys Wild who then won the Golden Jacket. Shortly afterwards Proper Heiress beat Mongys Wild to the title of 2025 greyhound of the year.

== Awards ==
Wallis has won the Greyhound Trainer of the Year a record 16-times (2005, 2008, 2009, 2012, 2013, 2014, 2015, 2016, 2017, 2018, 2019, 2021, 2022, 2023, 2024, 2025) and the Trainers Championship five times in 2006, 2010, 2018, 2022 and 2025.
