= Nottingham Greyhound Stadium =

Greyhound racing venue in England

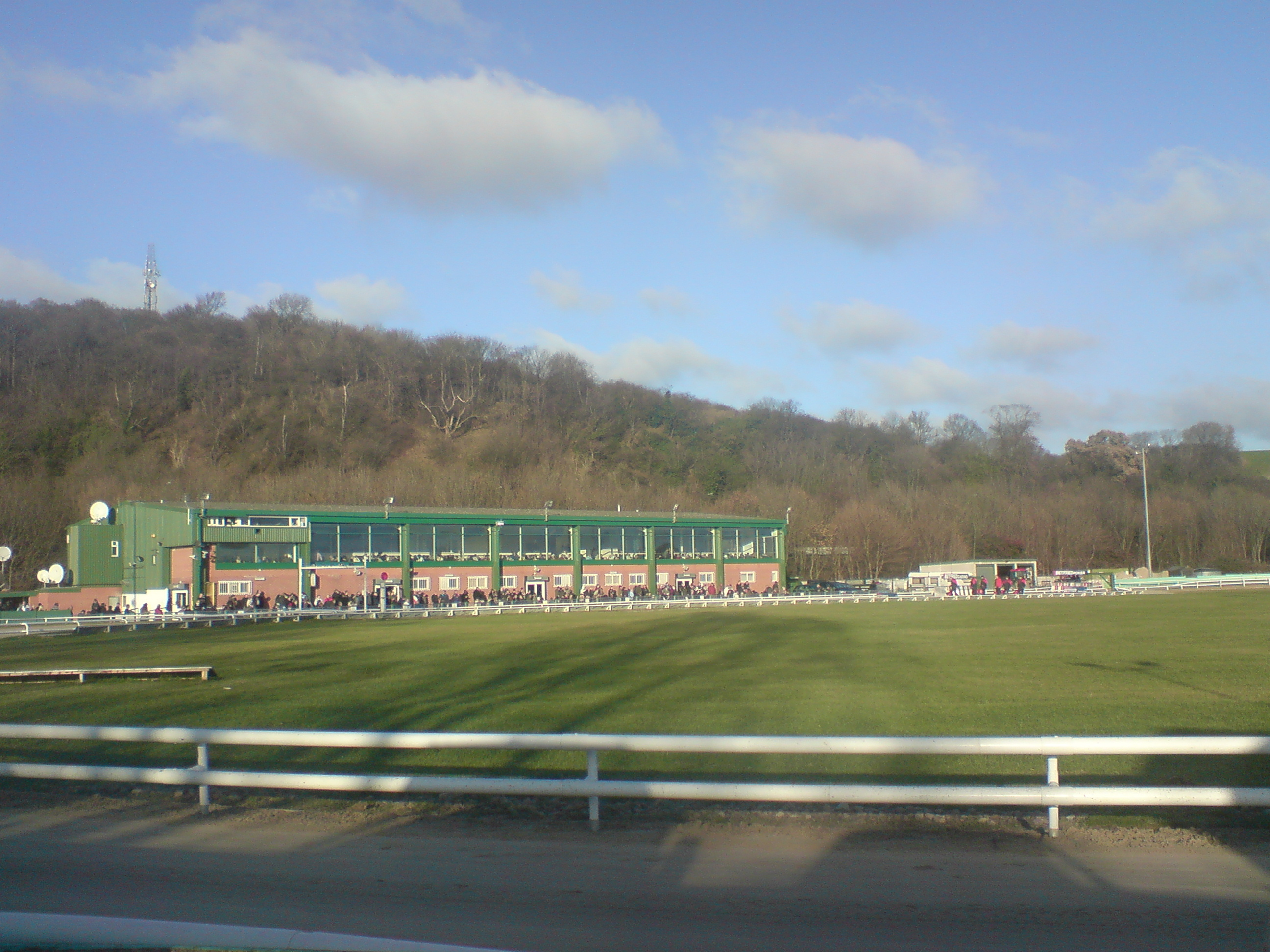
- The grandstand in 2008
- Interactive map of Nottingham Greyhound Stadium
- Location: Colwick Park, Nottingham, Nottinghamshire, NG2 4BE
- Coordinates: 52.950°N 1.111°W
- Owner: Arena Racing Company
- Operator: Arena Racing Company
- Capacity: 1,500
- Surface: Sand
- Field size: 437 metres (1,434 ft)

Construction
- Opened: 24 January 1980
- Expanded: 19 August 2008

Website
- Official website

Nottingham Greyhound Stadium is a greyhound racing track and stadium on the outskirts of Nottingham, England.

Races at the course are held on Monday and Friday evenings as well as additional matinée meetings every Wednesday & Thursday. The circumference of the track is 437 metres (1,434 ft).

== Competitions ==
The stadium holds several competitions annually:

- The Select Stakes, (500 metres), invitation event
- The Puppy Classic – August, (500 metres), puppy event
- The British Breeders Stakes – March, (500 metres), British-bred event
- The St Leger, September, (730 metres)
- The Eclipse – November, (500 metres)
- The National Sprint – December, (305 metres)
- The Guineas (500 metres) (former event)

== Origins and opening ==
In 1970 the White City Stadium in Nottingham closed down leaving the city without greyhound racing. However members of the Severn and Trent greyhound clubs had maintained a presence in the council's thoughts and several years later plans for a new track within the Nottingham Racecourse site began to surface. The site of the racecourse was west of the village of Colwick and the racecourse had been open since 1892.

On 24 January 1980 the Colwick Park greyhound track opened, it was situated on the north side of the racecourse where a car parking area had stood and previous to that it had been an old bed of the River Trent. The circumference of the track was 442 metres and was described as a very good galloping track with long straights and the sand used was Worksop Grey. The Managing Director Jon Carter announced that there were over 2,000 attending the first meeting which consisted of eight races, six over 500m and two over 295m. The first winner was a greyhound called Tartan Al trained by W Horton who won in 32.98sec at odds of 7–1.

== History ==
=== 20th century ===
An initial investment of £250,000 included the Panorama Room with a state of the art restaurant and totalisator. The first Racing Manager was Jim Woods, the Director of Racing was Terry Meynell and the first trainers were Bill Horton, Christine Lawlor, A Coppin, T Smith and one Charlie Lister. Another trainer that appeared on opening night was Geoff DeMulder and he joined the track in 1984. Racing took place on Monday, Thursday and Saturday evenings and the nature of the large track soon attracted some of the sports best greyhounds including Scurlogue Champ who broke the track record in October 1985 and then Ballyregan Bob who won two races at Nottingham that formed part of his world record breaking run during November 1985 & April 1986 with the first run creating a new track record. It was also in 1986 that Coventry closed resulting in the Eclipse competition finding a new home at Nottingham. In April 1989 the 'Outside Sumner' hare was replaced by the 'Bramich' and race distances were re-measured as 310, 500, 700 & 747m.

In 1988 Terry Corden took control of Nottingham from Wiseville Ltd, Corden had recently sold Derby Greyhound Stadium and had been successful during the property boom. Racing Manager Jim Woods left to join Monmore Green Stadium and was replaced by Mick Smith before Peter Robinson took over. One of the first tasks of the new owners was to invest in new facilities and in 1989 the track underwent a considerable upgrade.

A new competition introduced to the track in 1990 was the National Sprint, the important race had struggled to find a home since the closure of Harringay Stadium and would be held towards the end of the year and was known as the Peter Derrick Christmas Cracker for a few years. Trainer Dawn Wheatley trained Ayr Flyer, who finished runner-up in the 1994 English Greyhound Derby.

Wembley closed to greyhound racing in 1996 and Nottingham was awarded the prestigious Select Stakes as a consequence in 1997. Trainer Charlie Lister won the 1997 English Greyhound Derby and Scottish Greyhound Derby with Some Picture.

It was voted 'Central Region Racecourse of the Year' by the British Greyhound Racing Board for 1998–1999.

=== 21st century ===
The track was voted 'Central Region Racecourse of the Year' by the British Greyhound Racing Board for a second time in 2001–2002. A new kennel range costing £250,000 was introduced in 2003. Stadium owner Terry Corden brought his daughter Rachel and son Nathan into the business and they are now both heavily involved in the running of the track. Another event (the Produce Stakes taken from Hall Green Stadium) came to the track in 2009.

In 2018 the stadium signed a deal with Arena Racing Company (ARC) to race every Monday and Friday evening and a matinée meeting every Tuesday. During 2019 the track was chosen as the new venue for the sport's most famous event, the English Greyhound Derby which switched from Towcester.

In 2020 the stadium was sold by Nottingham Greyhound Stadium Ltd to ARC. The Director of Nottingham Greyhound Stadium Rachel Corden was retained by ARC and appointed ARC Greyhound Operations Director. In 2021 the Derby returned to Towcester following two years at Nottingham. In 2022, the stadium owners ARC signed a long term deal with Entain for media rights, starting in January 2024.

In 2024, Nottingham received the prestigious St Leger to be held for the first time at the track in 2025.

== Track records ==
=== Current ===
Metres	Greyhound	Time (sec)	Date	Notes/ref
255	Skate On	14.84	18 August 2014	
305	Target Harris	17.34	2 June 2014	
480	Swift Hoffman	28.07	15 July 2014	
500	Proper Heiress	28.95	24 November 2025	Eclipse final
680	Fabulous Shanty	41.06	4 March 2013	
730	Mongys Wild	43.82	8 Sept 2025	
905	Festival Time	56.46	18 November 2014	
925	Fearsome Liberty	57.86	18 November 2013	

=== Former ===
Extended content

Metres	Greyhound	Time (sec)	Date	Notes
255	Mother Shauna	14.88	9 June 2014	
295	Tims Crow	17.45	24 November 2003	
295	Laser Beam	17.43	26 August 2005	
300	Nervous Paddy	17.81	24 December 2001	
300	Hawk I Hunt	17.68	2 June 2003	
305	Laser Beam	17.77	14 November 2005	
305	Carrib Prince	17.73	12 December 2005	National Sprint heats
305	Ningbo Jack	17.73	12 December 2005	National Sprint heats
305	Ballydaniel Bozz	17.73	9 January 2006	
305	Ballydaniel Bozz	17.57	20 February 2006	
305	Ningbo Jack	17.55	29 May 2006	
305	Against the Lead	17.55	18 July 2006	
305	Against the Lead	17.51	21 August 2006	
305	Rotar Wing	17.47	13 December 2010	National Sprint semi-final
305	Jumeirah Dubai	17.45	3 December 2012	
310	Yellow Jersey	18.58	1989	
310	Cocktail Darkie	18.18	4 September 1989	
312	Fagans Friend	18.41	24 January 1987	
460	Myth Maker	28.01	20 August 1990	
460	Carmels Prince	27.75	1 October 1990	
460	Stop To Conquer	27.75	20 June 1991	
460	Almost New	27.66	31 October 1992	
480	Tullerboy Lass	28.83	12 June 2001	
480	Larkhill Lo	28.82	26 November 2002	
480	Baliff Spring	28.71	27 July 2004	
480	Pennys Shakira	28.60	23 July 2007	
480	Lively Arthur	28.59	21 August 2007	
480	Farloe Reason	28.39	21 December 2007	
480	Bit View Micko	28.32	22 October 2012	
480	Diesel Blue	28.31	21 January 2013	
480	Bower Stone	28.25	30 July 2013	
485	Sun Ging	29.50	26 December 1986	
485	Fearless Ace	29.26	1987	
500	Holyhill Way	30.35	10 March 1987	
500	Drumgoon Swallow	30.53	1989	
500	Fires of War	30.00	30 July 1990	
500	World Wind	29.98	29 October 1990	
500	Westmead Merlin	29.65	17 October 1994	
500	Droopys Rhys	29.77	23 April 2001	
500	Top Savings	29.67	30 August 2001	
500	Top Savings	29.43	14 April 2003	
500	Droopys Shearer	29.34	4 August 2003	
500	Fear Me	29.45	14 November 2005	Eclipse heats
500	Shelbourne Rene	29.28	18 September 2006	
500	Ballymac Eske	29.28	22 October 2012	
500	Ballymac Eske	29.21	29 October 2012	
500	Sawpit Sensation	29.16	28 November 2012	Eclipse final
500	Skywalker Logan	29.05	25 May 2019	Derby first round
530	Decoy Gold	32.03	16 October 1980	
680	Ballyregan Bob	41.87	9 November 1985	Part of the 32 world record
680	Wailea Flash	41.67	1987	
680	Wentworth Which	41.36	9 July 2007	
680	Aero Rebel	41.26	19 November 2012	
700	Hot News	44.24	1989	
700	Doves Delight	43.50	18 September 1989	
700	Mobile Magic	43.06	28 January 1993	
700	Lavally Pete	43.43	29 April 1999	
700	Sexy Delight	42.73	11 September 2000	
700	Top Plan	42.66	9 June 2003	
700	Tinrah Lad	42.87	11 April 2005	
722	Farloe Bonus	42.89	24 May 1999	
722	El Poker	45.38	28 August 2000	
722	Farloe Bonus	43.70	27 November 2000	
730	Droopys Kenny	45.36	4 November 2005	
730	Gunner Black	45.00	9 January 2006	
730	Fabulous Sophie	44.99	30 January 2006	
730	Blonde Pearl	44.19	20 February 2006	
747	Manx Marajax	47.03	1989	
747	Road Princess	46.87	27 August 1990	
747	Penny I Am	46.50	16 September 1991	
747	Miss Piggy	46.12	26 September 1994	
754	Scurlogue Champ	47.30	17 October 1985	
754	Change Guard	47.02	1987	
885	Ericas Equity	56.32	19 January 2004	
885	Lisnakill Cathal	55.68	27 July 2004	
900	Easy Field	57.76	27 August 1990	
900	Clonbrin Basket	57.52	11 July 1991	
900	Clonbrin Basket	56.91	8 August 1991	
900	Red Arrow Lady	56.76	24 October 1991	
902	Let Us Know	57.25	11 March 2002	
905	Ziggy Girl	57.56	12 January 2004	
905	Flying Winner	56.99	20 November 2008	
905	Art Banksy	56.90	15 July 2014	
905	Mays Petal	56.58	28 October 2014	
925	Seathwaite Robby	58.13	20 November 2006	
927	Limekiln Pearl	59.60	25 August 1987	
937	Deenside Fire	59.74	30 August 1993	
485 H	Distant Echo	30.15	24 August 1987	
500 H	Speedy Tiger	30.99	17 October 1985	
500 H	El Tenor	30.71	21 June 1999	
