= Henlow Derby =

- Location: Henlow
- Inaugurated: 1984
- Final run: 2018
- Sponsor: Bob Morton

Race information
- Distance: 460 metres
- Surface: Sand

The Henlow Derby, formerly the Bedfordshire Derby, was a greyhound racing competition held annually at Henlow Stadium in Stondon, Bedfordshire.

It was inaugurated in 1984 over 484 metres but switched to 460 metres in 1994. The event was last held in 2018.

== Past winners ==
Year	Winner	Breeding	Trainer	Time	SP	Notes
1984	Trinas Samurai	Brave Bran – Trina Ceili	Edna Wearing Harringay)	29.32	5-2jf	
1985	Glamour Hobo	Nameless Star – Glamour Show	Charlie Lister (Private)	29.20	7-4f	
1986	Westmead Call	Whisper Wishes – Westmead Tania	Natalie Savva (Milton Keynes)	29.12	4-5f	Track record
1987	Dancing Diamond	Ballyheigue Moon – Noras Princess	John Walton (Belle Vue)	29.65	9-2	
1988	Lying Eyes	The Other Risk - Gisele	Ernie Gaskin Sr. (Private)	29.58	8-11f	
1989	Seafield Skipper	Sail On II – Princeton Darkie	Tony Bullen (Private)	29.72	40-1	
1990	Cannonette	Westmead Cannon – Bernadette Girl	Mel Bass (Private)	29.36	7-4f	
1991	Lyons Monk	The Other Risk – Mountkeefe Lady	John Coleman (Walthamstow)	29.41	7-4f	
1992	Next Move	Airmount Grand – Westmead Move	Nick Savva (Milton Keynes)	29.37	11-10f	
1993	Winsor Vic	Dukes Lodge – Winsor Aird	John McGee Sr. (Reading)	29.12	1-1f	
2004	Farloe Pocket	Larkhill Jo – Tornaroy Tumble	Barrie Draper (Sheffield)	27.71	9-4	
2005	Westmead Joe	Larkhill Jo – Mega Delight	Nick Savva (Private)	27.49	4-7f	
2006	Canary Sky	Top Honcho – Charity Echo	Joanne Taylor (Henlow)	28.20	5-2	
2007	Drink Up Zorro	Galipip Trooper – Hows Tings	Paul Sallis (Hall Green)	27.85	5-2f	
2008	Jogadusc Ace	Brett Lee – Star of Dromin	Mark Wallis (Harlow)	27.48	2-1f	
2010	Westmead Guru	Tyrur Ted – Westmead Swift	Kelly Findlay (Private)	27.52	7-2	
2011	Taylors Sky	Westmead Hawk – Rising Angel	Charlie Lister OBE (Private)	27.16	4/7f	
2012	Loughteen Blanco	Droopys Scolari – Loughteen Lassie	Seamus Cahill (Hove)	27.79	11/4	
2014	Southern Mesut	Ballymac Maeve – Foxes Lady	Charlie Lister OBE (Private)	27.49	3/1	
2015	Making Paper	Hondo Black – Quarterland Hope	Diane Henry (Henlow)	27.56	4/1	
2016	Lenson Santi	Tullymurry Act – Jaytee Dancer	Tony Collett (Sittingbourne)	27.41	6/1	
2017	King Elvis	Tullymurry Act – Skate On	Liz McNair (Private)	27.11	6/4f	
2018	Bubbly Turbo	Razldazl Jayfkay – Rattle the Can	Paul Young (Romford)	27.36	8/1	

== Distances ==
- 1984–1994 (484 metres)
- 2004–2018 (460 metres)

== Sponsors ==
- 2015–2017 Racing Post Greyhound TV
- 2018–2018 Bob Morton honouring Westmead Hawk
