= Ladbrokes Summer Stayers Classic =

English greyhound racing competition

- Class: Category 1
- Location: Monmore Green Stadium
- Inaugurated: 2002
- Sponsor: Ladbrokes

Race information
- Distance: 630 metres
- Surface: Sand
- Purse: £10,000 (winner)

The Ladbrokes Summer Stayers Classic is a greyhound racing competition held annually at Monmore Green Stadium.

It was inaugurated in 2002.

== Venues and distances ==
- 2003–2003 (Monmore 684m)
- 2002–present (Monmore 630m)

== Sponsors ==
- 2002–present Ladbrokes

== Past winners ==
Year	Winner	Breeding	Trainer	Time (sec)	SP	Notes/ref
2002	Glencoes Tom	Toms The Best – Glencoe Star	Dilys Steels (Peterborough)	37.59	9/4cf	
2003	Centour Corker	Smooth Rumble – Sylvies Rantogue	Brian Clemenson (Hove)	40.60	4/5f	Track record
2004	Marmions	Droopys Kewell – Droopys Gaf	Paul Young (Romford)	37.93	5/4f	
2005	Westmead Hawk	Sonic Flight – Mega Delight	Nick Savva (Private)	37.08	10/11f	
2006	Westmead Aoifa	Larkhill Jo – Mega Delight	Nick Savva (Private)	37.92	1/1f	
2007	Datona Dandy	Top Honcho – Datona Destiny	Yvonne Morris (Doncaster)	38.57	20/1	
2008	Elderberry Azel	Honcho Classic – Elderberry Vixen	Patricia Cowdrill (Monmore)	38.43	6/1	
2009	Droopys Zach	Knockabout Wok – Droopys Darlene	Mark Wallis (Harlow)	37.37	5/1	
2010	Ten Dollars More	Hondo Black – Mallogs Penny	Chris Allsopp (Monmore)	38.01	9/2	
2011	Head Iton Jason	Westmead Hawk – Droopys Grisham	Chris Allsopp (Monmore)	37.85	9/4	
2012	Mark My Words	Westmead Hawk – Jazz Hurricane	Paul Sallis (Monmore)	37.50	5/2	
2013	Afew Dollarsmore	Droopys Scolari – Flying Winner	Chris Allsopp (Monmore)	37.74	4/1	
2014	Airport Captain	Big Daddy Cool – Airport Boss	Kevin Hutton (Swindon)	37.55	7/2	
2015	Millwards Teddy	Westmead Hawk – Droopys Solange	Dean Childs (Hove)	37.63	11/10f	
2016	Ferryforth Fran	College Causeway – Diegos Lady	Mark Wallis (Towcester)	37.86	14/1	
2017	Buckos Lass	Kinloch Brae – Paradise Siesta	Corren Price (Monmore)	38.00	16/1	
2018	Ela Juliet	Romeo Recruit – Killinan Baby	Matt Dartnall (Towcester)	37.77	7/4jf	
2019	Sheldan	Top Savings – Body Clock	Kevin Boon (Yarmouth)	37.45	9/2	
2020	Kingsbrook Glyn	Droopys Sydney – Ballymac Razl	Kevin Hutton (Monmore)	37.66	5/1	
2021	Coolavanny Bani	Droopys Sydney – Toms Delight	Angela Harrison (Newcastle)	37.87	4/1	
2022	Warzone Tom	Good News – Bogger Bonnie	Liz McNair (Private)	37.86	5/4f	
2023	Fromposttopillar	Droopys Sydney – Rafa Babys Baby	Liz McNair (Private)	37.37	7/4	
2024	Droopys Clue	Out Of Range ASB – Droopys Natalia	Seamus Cahill (Hove)	37.54	7/4f	
2025	Vhagar	Dorotas Wildcat – Limini	Mark Wallis (Private)	37.54	1/1f	
