= Ladbrokes Gold Cup =

English greyhound racing competition

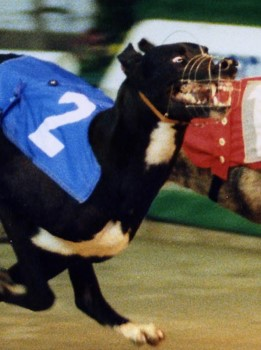
- Black Buster, 1998 winner
- Class: Category 1
- Location: Monmore Green Stadium
- Inaugurated: 1994
- Sponsor: Ladbrokes

Race information
- Distance: 480 metres
- Surface: Sand
- Purse: £10,000 (winner)

The Ladbrokes Gold Cup previously the Ladbrokes Midland Gold Cup is a greyhound competition held at Monmore Green Stadium. It was revived in 1994 and was originally known as the Midland Gold Cup.

Winners have included the 1998 English Greyhound Derby champion Toms The Best and the 2011 English Greyhound Derby winner Taylors Sky.

== Venues and distances ==
- 1994–present (Monmore 480m)

== Sponsors ==
- 2014–present Ladbrokes

== Past winners ==
Year	Winner	Breeding	Trainer	Time (sec)	SP	notes/ref
1994	Droopys Craig	Moral Support – Droopys Aliysa	Henry Tasker (Private)	29.31	5/2	
1995	Westmead Chick	Im Slippy – Westmead Move	Nick Savva (Walthamstow)	29.09	4/6f	
1996	Chairman	Live Contender – Little Witch	Jimmy Gibson Belle Vue	29.22	6/4f	
1997	Toms The Best	Frightful Flash – Ladys Guest	Nick Savva (Walthamstow)	28.21	2/1	
1998	Black Buster	Joyful Tidings – Little Champagne	Ivan Williams (Perry Barr)	28.13	9/2	
1999	Crack Off	Mountleader Peer – Highsted Rose	Brian Clemenson (Hove)	28.13	2/1f	
2000	Fervent Flash	Frightful Flash – Murtys Fancy	Tony Meek (Monmore Green)	28.59	4/1	
2001	Potto Knows	He Knows – Pottos Way	David Mullins (Romford)	28.51	4/1	
2002	Lodgeview Chance	Top Honcho – Fees Chance	Danny Talbot (Kinsley)	28.29	10/1	
2003	Farloe Brazil	Mr Bozz – Farloe Dingle	Charlie Lister (Private)	28.12	9/2	
2004	Elderberry Veron	Top Honcho – Elderberry Flyer	Patricia Cowdrill (Monmore)	28.21	5/2	
2005	Loughteen Bandit	Larkhill Jo – Loughteen Velvet	Michael Harris (Monmore)	27.92	6/1	
2006	Westmead Joe	Larkhill Jo – Mega Delight	Nick Savva (Private)	27.89	6/4	
2007	Boherna On Air	Kiowa Sweet Trey – Free To Air	Barrie Draper (Sheffield)	28.10	4/7f	
2008	Boherna Best	Pacific Mile – Always On Air	Barrie Draper (Sheffield)	28.45	3/1	
2009	Barbies Man	Yeah Man – Barbies Bluebird	Julie Bateson (Private)	27.95	12/1	
2010	Bucks Yahoo	Ballymac Maeve – Mottos Dawn	Chris Lund (Doncaster)	28.04	7/2	
2011	Taylors Sky	Westmead Hawk – Rising Angel	Charlie Lister OBE (Private)	27.80	4/6f	
2012	Mags Gamble	Crash – Movealong Rose	Harry Williams (Newcastle)	28.34	7/1	
2013	Shaneboy Spencer	Droopys Scolari – Shaneboy Maria	Liz McNair (Private)	28.37	6/4jf	
2014	Viking Jack	Vans Escalade – Heroes Last lass	Jim Hayton (Private)	27.94	6/4	
2015	Swift Hoffman	Makeshift – Swift Erin	Pat Rosney (Private)	27.70	4/7f	
2016	Jaytee Spartacus	Scolari Me Daddy – Sizzling Gina	Paul Young (Romford)	27.83	5/2	
2017	Droopys Buick	Yeah Man – Droopys Hilda	Angela Harrison (Newcastle)	27.63	5/4f	
2018	King Turbo	Leamaneigh Turbo – Wee Tiger Tots	Liz McNair (Private)	28.30	5/4f	
2019	Seaglass Tiger	Drumcrow Obama – Abrakebabra Bee	Patrick Janssens (Central Park)	28.28	4/1	
2020	Gonzo	Laughil Blake – Rushmoorbeatrice	Julie Bateson (Private)	28.31	9/2	
2021	Minglers Popeye	Sparta Maestro – Minglers Suarez	Stuart Tighe (Newcastle)	28.45	11/2	
2022	Move Over Cha	Gaytime Hawk – Move Over Eliza	Angela Harrison (Newcastle)	28.59	6/4f	
2023	Links Maverick	Grangeview Ten – Havana Lottie	Tom Heilbron (Newcastle)	27.70	4/6f	
2024	Churchfield Syd	Droopys Sydney – Millbank Jade	Richard Rees (Hove)	28.00	8/13f	
2025	Headford Dane	Ballymac Bolger – Headford Honey	Maxine Locke (Romford)	27.79	3/1	
