= Taylors Sky =

Racing greyhound (born 2009)

- Sire: Westmead Hawk
- Dam: Rising Angel
- Sex: Dog
- Whelped: March 2009
- Color: White and blue
- Breeder: Noel Fleming
- Owner: Steve and Becky Taylor
- Trainer: Charlie Lister OBE

Record
- Winner of the English Greyhound Derby

Other awards
- 2011 Greyhound of the Year

Taylors Sky (born 1 March 2009) is a white and blue male greyhound. He is owned by Steve and Becky Taylor and was trained by Charlie Lister. He won the English Greyhound Derby in 2011, and was named Britain's Greyhound of the Year in 2011, having won thirteen of seventeen races entered during the season. His father was two-time English Greyhound Derby winner Westmead Hawk. His half-brother Sidaz Jack also won the English Greyhound Derby in 2013.

== Racing career ==
Taylors Sky was sired by Westmead Hawk, from the dam Rising Angel on 1 March 2009. Westmead Hawk was a two-time English Greyhound Derby winner. He is owned by Steve and Becky Taylor and has a white and blue coat. His trainer is Charlie Lister.

Only ten races into his career he was entered into the 2011 English Greyhound Derby at Wimbledon Stadium. During the initial qualifying rounds, he was placed at 100–1 to take the title. He broke the track record, recording 28.21 seconds in the quarter-finals and equalled the time when winning his semi-final, before going on to qualify for the final. In the final he was placed into trap one, from which no dog had won the race for 26 years. Despite this, he took the lead at the first bend and led from there on, winning by five-and-a-half lengths from Westmead Guru in another new track record with a time of 28.17. This was the sixth English Derby win for trainer Charlie Lister. Taylor Sky won the prize fund of £75,000 for his owners. A year ahead of the 2012 derby he was placed at initial odds of 16–1; a victory there would make him only the fifth greyhound to have won the title twice.

During 2011 he won twelve of seventeen races entered, including the Ladbrokes Gold Cup and the Henlow Derby. The Henlow Derby came with a prize of £15,000 and despite being pushed by Gold Snapper, Sky was seen as the favourite to become Greyhound of the Year after his victory. This was confirmed on 22 January 2012 at the Park Plaza Riverbank Hotel in London; he was named the 2011 Greyhound of the Year at the Greyhound Board of Great Britain awards. His owners also won the title of Owners of the Year, as they are also the owners of Scottish Greyhound Derby winner, Taylors Cruise.

During 2012 he reached several category 1 finals, including some very close finishes, but never managed to win one. The closest he came was in the East Anglian Derby, worth £15,000, but was denied by a leading greyhound trained by Paul Young called Bubbly Phoenix. The final saw favourite Bubbly Phoenix lead at halfway to win the prize for his owners 'The Champagne Club Syndicate' with Taylors Sky running on for second place.

He broke track records at Henlow Stadium and Perry Barr Stadium and after retirement to stud was a prolific sire of litters.

== Pedigree ==
Frightful Flash
Sonic Flight
Westmead Flight
Westmead Hawk
Smooth Rumble
Mega Delight
Knockeevan Joy
Taylors Sky
Larkhill Jo
Droopys Kewell
Perrys Pusher
Rising Angel
Highway Leader
Rising Singer
Rising Dowry
