= 2005 Irish Greyhound Derby =

2005 Paddy Power Irish Greyhound Derby
- Venue: Shelbourne Park
- Location: Dublin
- Start date: 11 August
- End date: 17 September
- Total prize money: €150,000 (winner)

The 2005 Irish Greyhound Derby took place during August and September with the final being held at Shelbourne Park in Dublin on 17 September 2005.

The winner He Said So won €150,000 and was trained by Tim O'Donovan, owned by Jim Hennessy & Tim O'Donovan and bred by Mick O'Donovan. The race was sponsored by the Paddy Power.

== Final result ==
At Shelbourne, 17 September (over 550 yards):

Position	Winner	Breeding	Trap	SP	Time	Trainer
1st	He Said So	Top Honcho - You Said So	1	10-1	29.66	Tim O'Donovan
2nd	Droopys Maldini	Droopys Kewell - Little Diamond UK	2	4-5f	30.01	Fraser Black
3rd	Billy Playback	Smooth Rumble - Nikitas Song	3	25-1	30.36	Francie Murray
4th	Droopys Marco	Droopys Kewell - Little Diamond UK	4	5-1	30.37	Fraser Black
5th	Westmead Hawk	Sonic Flight - Mega Delight	6	9-4	30.39	Nick Savva (England)
6th	Spiral Citrate	Top Honcho - Ullid Citrate	5	33-1	30.53	Eileen Gleeson

=== Distances ===
4½, 4½, short-head, head, 1¾ (lengths)

== Competition Report ==
The 2005 Irish Derby was highly anticipated after the inclusion of the English Greyhound Derby champion Westmead Hawk. In addition to the ante-post favourite were the returning 2004 Irish Greyhound Derby finalists Droopys Marco and Droopys Maldini.

First round winners included Droopys Marco and Droopys Maldini both winning in 29.77 but it was Ancient Title that put the fastest run of 29.49. Ardfert Billy set the best second round time of 29.69 even though he had just finished runner up in the Irish Sprint Cup at Dundalk Stadium in between the two rounds.

Droopys Maldini defeated Westmead Hawk in an impressive third round time of 29.50 and litter brother Droopys Marco also won again. The quarter final round resulted in another win for both Droopys Maldini and Droopys Marco. Westmead Hawk finally came good winning in 29.66 and Digital won the remaining heat.

The semi-finals went to plan with Droopys Maldini once again inflicted a defeat on Westmead Hawk in a very fast 29.47, He Said So did well to qualify behind the pair. Droopys Marco took the second heat from Billy Playback, with Spiral Citrate edging Mineola Farloe for the final place in the decider.

Droopys Maldini and Droopys Marco had unblemished records going into the final, the former was installed as the hot favourite. When the traps opened He Said So, drawn in trap one, broke well but ominously Westmead Hawk made a good break, with Droopys Maldini making a poor start. He Said So went round the first bend in the lead just one length ahead of Westmead Hawk which meant that the latter looked a certainty. However Droopys Maldini recovering from his bad start made the first bend at the same time as the others which caused a domino effect of trouble in which Billy Playback, Spiral Citrate and Westmead Hawk collided. He Said So was left clear and had a big lead from Droopys Maldini that was enough to seal a second successive 10-1 Irish Derby winner. Droopys Maldini and Droopys Marco finished second and fourth, exactly the same positions as the previous year and Westmead Hawk came home fifth with his chances ended by an uncustomary good start.

== Quarter finals ==
Heat 1 (Sep 3)
Pos	Name	SP	Time
1st	Droopys Marco	2-1f	29.70
2nd	He Said So	7-2	29.72
3rd	Ballymac Niloc	12-1	29.79
4th	Westmead Eagle	5-1	30.07
5th	Annies Lamb	4-1	30.09
6th	Geldrops Touch	4-1	30.19

Heat 2 (Sep 3)
Pos	Name	SP	Time
1st	Westmead Hawk	5-4f	29.66
2nd	Billy Playback	7-1	29.80
3rd	Mineola Farloe	7-2	29.94
4th	Tullow Rumble	8-1	30.11
5th	Ardfert Billy	7-2	30.18
6th	Go My Way	16-1	30.24

Heat 3 (Sep 3)
Pos	Name	SP	Time
1st	Digital	9-4	29.65
2nd	Blue Majestic	4-1	30.00
3rd	Spiral Citrate	6-1	30.07
4th	Disguised	6-4f	30.24
5th	Galway Mark	20-1	30.25
6th	Different State	12-1	30.31

Heat 4 (Sep 3)
Pos	Name	SP	Time
1st	Droopys Maldini	4-5f	29.57
2nd	Mall Road	16-1	29.74
3rd	Group Rooster	25-1	29.92
4th	Manx Charlie	25-1	30.13
5th	Tyrur Ted	5-4	30.20
6th	Idroveallnight	16-1	31.04

== Semi finals ==
First Semi Final (Sep 10)
Pos	Name of Greyhound	SP	Time
1st	Droopys Marco	1-1f	29.73
2nd	Billy Playback	5-1	30.11
3rd	Spiral Citrate	16-1	30.18
4th	Mineola Farloe	5-1	30.22
5th	Mall Road	14-1	30.39
6th	Digital	5-2	00.00

Second Semi Final (Sep 10)
Pos	Name of Greyhound	SP	Time
1st	Droopys Maldini	11-10f	29.47
2nd	Westmead Hawk	5-4	29.61
3rd	He Said So	9-2	29.71
4th	Group Rooster	25-1	29.82
5th	Blue Majestic	14-1	29.92
N/R	Ballymac Niloc		

== See also ==
- 2005 UK & Ireland Greyhound Racing Year
