= 2011 Irish Greyhound Derby =

Annual sporting event in Ireland

2011 Ladbrokes Irish Greyhound Derby
- Venue: Shelbourne Park
- Location: Dublin
- Start date: 6 August
- End date: 10 September
- Total prize money: €120,000 (winner)

The 2011 Irish Greyhound Derby took place during August and September with the final being held at Shelbourne Park in Dublin on 10 September 2011.

The winner Razldazl George won €120,000 and was trained by Dolores Ruth, owned by the Dazzling Syndicate and bred by Dolores Ruth. The race was sponsored by the Ladbrokes.

== Final result ==
At Shelbourne, 10 September (over 550 yards):

| Position | Winner | Breeding | Trap | Sectional | SP | Time | Trainer |
|---|---|---|---|---|---|---|---|
| 1st | Razldazl George | Kinloch Brae - Razldazl Pearl | 4 | 3.55 | 5-2 | 30.02 | Dolores Ruth |
| 2nd | Dream Walker | Black Shaw - Madam Hero | 2 | 3.62 | 10-1 | 30.03 | Tom O'Neill |
| 3rd | Krug Ninety Five | Droopys Maldini - Frontier Music | 5 | 3.56 | 8-1 | 30.27 | Fraser Black |
| 4th | Rockchase Bullet | Westmead Hawk - Droopys Bubble | 6 | 3.51 | 2-1f | 30.63 | Ronny Wuyts |
| 5th | Razldazl Bugatti | Brett Lee - Razldazl Pearl | 1 | 3.51 | 7-2 | 30.65 | Dolores Ruth |
| 6th | Rockview Head | Head Bound - Three Star Gem | 3 | 3.62 | 7-1 | 30.71 | Peter Cronin |

=== Distances ===
short-head, 3, 4½, neck, ¾ (lengths)

== Competition Report ==
The 2010 Irish Greyhound Derby champion Tyrur McGuigan returned to defend his title and was a first round winner. The fastest round one winner was Razldazl George in 29.38. In round two Razldazl George went fastest again 29.54 and in the third round Tyrur McGuigan won his third consecutive race in 29.83 as did Razldazl George and Razldazl Bugatti. 2010 finalist Barefoot Bullet failed to get to round three and the only British challenge came to end when Nick Savva's greyhounds were eliminated.

There were shocks in the quarter-finals starting with defending champion Tyrur McGuigan who finished last in his heat after finishing lame and was retired to stud. Makeshift, Razldazl Jayfkay, Melodys Royal and Tyrur Big Mike all failed to make the semi-finals. Heat winners were Dream Walker, Croom Star, Rockchase Bullet and Krug Ninety Five.

Rockchase Bullet claimed the first semi-final from Razldazl George and Rockview Head in 29.67 whilst Razldazl Bugatti beat veteran campaigner Krug Ninety Five and Dream Walker in the second semi recording 29.99.

In the final Razldazl Bugatti moved off and bumped Rockchase Bullet when both were well placed. This left Razldazl George to take up the running and hold off a late challenge from Dream Walker.

== Quarter finals ==
Heat 1 (Aug 27)
| Pos | Name | SP | Time |
|---|---|---|---|
| 1st | Dream Walker | 7-1 | 29.87 |
| 2nd | Razldazl Bugatti | 7-4 | 29.89 |
| 3rd | Hey Gringo | 16-1 | 29.91 |
| 4th | Melodys Royal | 5-4f | 29.98 |
| 5th | Ballymac Mitsy | 7-1 | 30.15 |
| 6th | Nikitas Scut | 12-1 | 30.22 |

Heat 2 (Aug 27)
| Pos | Name | SP | Time |
|---|---|---|---|
| 1st | Croom Star | 8-1 | 29.99 |
| 2nd | Droopys Twirl | 5-2 | 30.06 |
| 3rd | Piercestown Sand | 7-1 | 30.16 |
| 4th | Kingo | 10-1 | 30.30 |
| 5th | Ohio Rumble | 8-1 | 30.31 |
| 6th | Tyrur McGuigan | 1-1f | 30.80 |

Heat 3 (Aug 27)
| Pos | Name | SP | Time |
|---|---|---|---|
| 1st | Rockchase Bullet | 6-1 | 29.80 |
| 2nd | Razldazl George | 9-4 | 30.11 |
| 3rd | Coolykereen Imp | 7-1 | 30.17 |
| 4th | Makeshift | 7-4f | 30.18 |
| 5th | Pepsi Billy | 5-1 | 30.35 |
| 6th | Airforce Roger | 10-1 | 30.49 |

Heat 4 (Aug 27)
| Pos | Name | SP | Time |
|---|---|---|---|
| 1st | Krug Ninety Five | 9-1 | 30.01 |
| 2nd | Rafas Wee Pet | 12-1 | 30.08 |
| 3rd | Rockview Head | 7-2 | 30.32 |
| 4th | Tyrur Big Mike | 9-4 | 30.53 |
| 5th | Shelbourne Geoff | 7-1 | 30.60 |
| 6th | Razldazl Jayfkay | 6-4f | 30.66 |

== Semi finals ==
First Semi-final (Sep 3)
| Pos | Name of Greyhound | SP | Time |
|---|---|---|---|
| 1st | Rockchase Bullet | 3-1 | 29.67 |
| 2nd | Razldazl George | 9-10f | 29.84 |
| 3rd | Rockview Head | 10-1 | 29.86 |
| 4th | Droopys Twirl | 5-1 | 29.93 |
| 5th | Rafas Wee Pet | 16-1 | 30.98 |
| 6th | Hey Gringo | 16-1 | 30.99 |

Second Semi-final (Sep 3)
| Pos | Name of Greyhound | SP | Time |
|---|---|---|---|
| 1st | Razldazl Bugatti | 6-4f | 29.99 |
| 2nd | Krug Ninety Five | 10-1 | 30.04 |
| 3rd | Dream Walker | 100-30 | 30.15 |
| 4th | Piercestown Sand | 9-2 | 30.22 |
| 5th | Croom Star | 7-1 | 30.50 |
| 6th | Coolykereen Imp | 4-1 | 30.53 |

== See also ==
- 2011 UK & Ireland Greyhound Racing Year
