= 2005 English Greyhound Derby =

Greyhound racing event

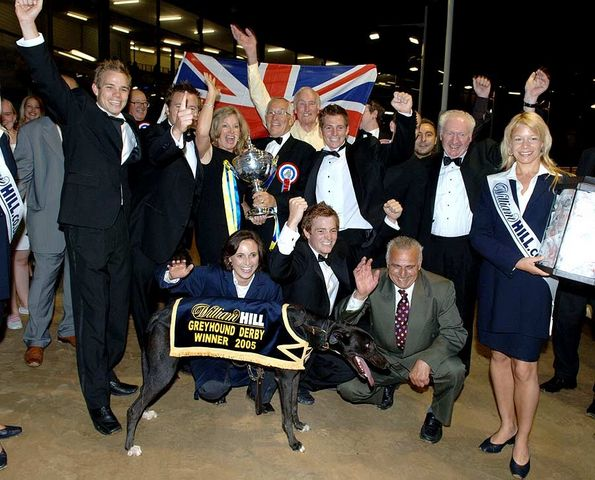
- English Derby Winner 2005 – Westmead Hawk
- Location: Wimbledon Stadium
- Start date: 2 June
- End date: 2 July
- Total prize money: £100,000 (winner)

The 2005 William Hill Greyhound Derby took place in June and July with the final being held on 2 July 2005 at Wimbledon Stadium. The winner Westmead Hawk received the title and £100,000 in prize money.

== Final result ==
At Wimbledon (over 480 metres):

Position	Name of Greyhound	Breeding	Trap	Sectional	SP	Time	Trainer
1st	Westmead Hawk	Sonic Flight - Mega Delight	4	5.11	5-4f	28.56	Nick Savva (Private)
2nd	Blonde Mac	Cool Performance - Garry Special	1	4.91	33-1	28.71	Arthur Hitch (Private)
3rd	Blue Majestic	Top Honcho - Marinas Tina	3	5.00	6-1	28.95	Seamus Graham (Ireland)
4th	Mineola Farloe	Top Honcho - Farloe Dingle	5	4.97	7-1	28.99	Seamus Graham (Ireland)
5th	Ningbo Jack	Honcho Classic - Pennys Spotlight	2	4.90	3-1	29.05	Charlie Lister (Private)
6th	Geldrops Touch	Droopys Vieri - Sporting Cleo	6	4.94	7-2	29.06	Owen McKenna (Ireland)

=== Distances ===
1¾, 3, ½, ¾, short head (lengths)
The distances between the greyhounds are in finishing order and shown in lengths. One length is equal to 0.08 of one second.

=== Final Report ===
The 2005 title was won by Westmead Hawk. It was the second year in a row that trainer Nick Savva won. After coming last out of the traps and having found trouble in the race, the winner was at the back of the field for most of the final. However, he ran on strong and took the lead just before the finishing line, providing a great climax to the race.

== Quarter finals ==
Heat 1 (21 Jun)
Pos	Name	SP	Time
1st	Ningbo Jack	3-1	28.92
2nd	Mineola Farloe	7-2	29.01
3rd	Loughteen Flyer	8-1	29.06
4th	Caulry King	7-1	29.16
5th	Ballymac Niloc	5-1	29.20
6th	Robbie De Niro	5-2f	29.26

Heat 2 (21 Jun)
Pos	Name	SP	Time
1st	Blue Majestic	1-1f	28.88
2nd	Count Gelignite	6-1	29.12
3rd	Hot Rocks	14-1	29.16
4th	Velvet Rebel	9-2	29.25
5th	Junior Mechanic	10-1	29.30
6th	Toms View	3-1	29.37

Heat 3 (21 Jun)
Pos	Name	SP	Time
1st	Westmead Hawk	2-1	28.57
2nd	Droopys Marco	4-6f	28.65
3rd	Blonde Mac	66-1	28.85
4th	Boherduff Light	5-1	29.12
5th	Bright Joe	50-1	29.28
6th	Drop Goal Jonny	20-1	29.36

Heat 4 (21 Jun)
Pos	Name	SP	Time
1st	January Tiger	3-1	28.66
2nd	Geldrops Touch	1-1f	28.76
3rd	Mustang Okee	8-1	28.85
4th	Blonde Boss	7-2	29.07
5th	Our Ocean	33-1	29.16
6th	Romeo Saha	25-1	29.24

== Semi finals ==
First Semi Final (25 Jun)
Pos	Name of Greyhound	SP	Time	Trainer
1st	Ningbo Jack	9-2	28.76	Lister
2nd	Blue Majestic	5-2	28.78	Graham
3rd	Geldrops Touch	7-1	28.81	McKenna
4th	Loughteen Flyer	25-1	28.92	Faint
5th	Count Gelignite	12-1	29.24	Bourke
6th	Droopys Marco	5-4f	29.36	Black

Second Semi Final (25 Jun)
Pos	Name of Greyhound	SP	Time	Trainer
1st	Mineola Farloe	3-1	28.77	Graham
2nd	Westmead Hawk	5-4f	28.86	Savva
3rd	Blonde Mac	25-1	28.99	Hitch
4th	Mustang Okee	16-1	29.26	Cahill
5th	January Tiger	11-4	29.31	Wallis
6th	Hot Rocks	20-1	29.39	Buckley

== Competition report ==
The leading English hopes were the Charlie Lister range including Robbie De Niro, Bell Devotion and Laurels champion Ningbo Jack. The Carly Philpott duo of Ballymac Pires and Ballymac Kewell were also considered dangers. Ireland sent over an impressive group led by the Frazer Black's Irish Derby finalists Droopys Marco (also the Scottish Greyhound Derby champion) and Droopys Maldini. The Seamus Graham pair Blue Majestic and Mineola Farloe lined up alongside the McKenna team now under control of Ger McKenna's son Owen, which included Superb Pass, Irish Derby finalist Geldrops Touch, Agassis Ace and Boherduff Light.

The 2004 Greyhound of the Year Fire Height Dan won his first round heat on 2 June but it was found that he had injured a pisiform bone. His connections announced that he would be retired. Droopys Leroy went fastest on the night, winning in 28.59. On the third night of heats Droopys Marco (28.60), Ballymac Pires (28.48) and Droopys Maldini (28.49) all impressed.

The second round began on 10 June with surprise eliminations including Agassis Ace, Hee Haws Barney and Ballymac Pires. The following night Westmead Hawk won again in a heat that contained Droopys Maldini, Droopys Marco impressed again going fastest in 28.58.

Droopys Leroy was eliminated in the first heat of round three which was won by Count Gelignite. The next heats went to Toms View, Velvet Rebel, Geldrops Touch and Ballymac Niloc before Droopys Marco held on to defeat the strong finishing Westmead Hawk in a sensational heat. Blue Majestic and Lenson Thierry completed the night's winners. Droopys Maldini and Romeo Paddy were high profile casualties.

Ningbo Jack won the first quarter final and Blue Majestic and January Tiger won heats 3 and 4 respectively but heat 2 was another meeting between Droopys Marco and Westmead Hawk. However this time Hawk caught Droopys Marco on the run-in to claim a revenge victory.

Westmead Hawk became a strong favourite when Droopys Marco failed to progress to the final in the first semi final, he found trouble in a race won by Ningo Jack and finished last. Blue Majestic and Geldrops Touch claimed the other two qualifying places. In the second semi final Westmead Hawk also found trouble but made his way through the field to finish second behind Mineola Farloe with outsider Blonde Mac taking third place.

== See also ==
- 2005 UK & Ireland Greyhound Racing Year
