= 2006 English Greyhound Derby =

Greyhound racing event

- Location: Wimbledon Stadium
- Start date: 4 May
- End date: 3 June
- Total prize money: £100,000 (winner)

The 2006 Blue Square Greyhound Derby took place during May & June with the final being on 3 June 2006 at Wimbledon Stadium. The winner and defending champion Westmead Hawk received £100,000. Westmead Hawk became only the fourth greyhound in history to win the Derby twice.

== Final result ==
At Wimbledon (over 480 metres):

Position	Name of Greyhound	Breeding	Trap	Sectional	SP	Time	Trainer
1st	Westmead Hawk	Sonic Flight - Mega Delight	4	5.02	4-7f	28.44	Nick Savva (Private)
2nd	Mineola Farloe	Top Honcho - Farloe Dingle	2	4.91	7-2	28.50	Seamus Graham (Ireland)
3rd	Amarillo Slim	Knockeevan Star - Lemon Sugar	5	4.92	6-1	28.56	Graham Calvert Jr. (Private)
4th	Westmead Joe	Larkhill Jo - Mega Delight	3	5.14	7-1	28.62	Nick Savva (Private)
5th	Cleenas Lady	Hondo Black - Mind the Way	1	5.11	25-1	28.76	Terry Dartnall (Private)
6th	Clash Darby	Come On Lleyton - Clash Minnie	6	4.93	33-1	28.96	John Geddis (Private)

=== Distances ===
¾, ¾, ¾, 1¾, 2½ (lengths)
The distances between the greyhounds are in finishing order and shown in lengths. One length is equal to 0.08 of one second.

=== Race report ===
Nick Savva's star, who was trailing Mineola Farloe around the last bend, produced his customary burst of late pace to snatch the victory on the home straight in a time of 28.44 (the fastest time of the year at the venue). The four other contenders all ran well breaking 29.00 seconds but none of them could stay with Westmead Hawk.

== Quarter finals ==
Heat 1 (May 23)
Pos	Name	SP	Time
1st	Clash Darby	25-1	28.63
2nd	Cleenas Lady	4-1	28.69
3rd	Larkhill Jim	7-4f	28.71
4th	Greenwell Storm	7-2	28.79
5th	Vancouver Sparky	5-1	28.81
6th	Hondo Dingle	9-2	28.95

Heat 2 (May 23)
Pos	Name	SP	Time
1st	Bubbly Classic	8-1	28.52
2nd	Ice And Lemon	7-2	28.66
3rd	Brookvill Genius	6-1	28.82
4th	Yorkshire	5-1	28.94
5th	Saving Time	12-1	28.96
6th	Greenwell Flash	5-4f	28.98

Heat 3 (May 23)
Pos	Name	SP	Time
1st	Westmead Joe	5-2	28.60
2nd	Amarillo Slim	4-1	28.61
3rd	Mineola Farloe	4-6f	28.68
4th	Frisby Fuller	20-1	28.78
5th	Milldean Billy	10-1	28.80
6th	Courts Ad Be	20-1	28.98

Heat 4 (May 23)
Pos	Name	SP	Time
1st	Westmead Hawk	8-11f	28.58
2nd	Ballymac Pires	12-1	28.64
3rd	Blue Majestic	8-1	28.84
4th	Fear Me	3-1	29.04
5th	Kanes Blue	5-1	29.26
6th	Baran Zeus	50-1	00.00

== Semi finals ==
First Semi Final (May 27)
Pos	Name of Greyhound	SP	Time	Trainer
1st	Amarillo Slim	7-4f	28.78	Calvert
2nd	Westmead Joe	3-1	28.90	Savva
3rd	Clash Darby	14-1	29.16	Geddis
4th	Bubbly Classic	7-2	29.28	Knight
5th	Brookvill Genius	14-1	29.34	Clemenson
6th	Blue Majestic	9-2	29.40	Graham

Second Semi Final (May 27)
Pos	Name of Greyhound	SP	Time	Trainer
1st	Westmead Hawk	4-5f	28.62	Savva
2nd	Mineola Farloe	5-1	28.64	Graham
3rd	Cleenas Lady	10-1	28.78	Dartnall
4th	Ballymac Pires	9-2	28.92	Dartnall
5th	Larkhill Jim	6-1	29.14	Gaughan
6th	Ice And Lemon	16-1	29.26	Rumney

== See also ==
- 2006 UK & Ireland Greyhound Racing Year
