= 2007 English Greyhound Derby =

Greyhound racing event

- Location: Wimbledon Stadium
- Start date: 8 June
- End date: 7 July
- Total prize money: £100,000 (winner)

The 2007 Blue Square Greyhound Derby took place during June & July with the final being held on 7 July 2007 at Wimbledon Stadium. The winner Westmead Lord received £100,000.

== Final result ==
At Wimbledon (over 480 metres):

Position	Name of Greyhound	Breeding	Trap	Sectional	SP	Time	Trainer
1st	Westmead Lord	Droopys Kewell – Mega Delight	6	4.79	6-1	28.47	Nick Savva (Henlow)
2nd	Loyal Honcho	Top Honcho – Midway Crystal	5	4.91	6-4f	28.51	Seamus Graham (Ireland)
3rd	Forest Scholes	Droopys Scholes – Colorado Tina	1	5.00	8-1	28.54	Fraser Black (Ireland)
4th	Dilemmas Flight	Droopys Vieri – Early Flight	3	5.03	2-1	28.62	Nick Savva (Henlow)
5th	Ullid Connor	Late Late Show – Tyrur Gillian	2	4.90	5-1	28.63	Paul Hennessy (Ireland)
6th	Caulry Fast Trap	Spiral Nikita – Queen Survivor	4	5.05	33-1	28.77	Liz McNair (Private)

=== Distances ===
½, neck, 1, short head, 1¾ (lengths)
The distances between the greyhounds are in finishing order and shown in lengths. One length is equal to 0.08 of one second.

=== Race Report ===
The final was won by Westmead Lord in a time of 28.47 seconds. The winner, who was trained by Nick Savva and was a half brother to former two-time winner Westmead Hawk, dominated the race from the very start. 6–4 favourite Loyal Honcho improved as the race progressed, but just missed out on the ultimate prize by half a length. It was the second time that a Seamus Graham trained runner had finished second in as many years.

== Quarter finals ==
Heat 1 (26 Jun)
Pos	Name	SP	Time
1st	Dilemmas Flight	5-2	28.68
2nd	Directors Chair	12-1	29.00
3rd	Ballymac Charley	16-1	29.18
4th	Blonde Dino	5-1	29.19
5th	Full Bloom	25-1	29.29
6th	Droopys Robinho	4-6f	29.41

Heat 2 (26 Jun)
Pos	Name	SP	Time
1st	Farloe Premier	5-1	28.52
2nd	Forest Scholes	5-1	28.82
3rd	Greenwell Storm	5-2f	28.86
4th	Zigzag Dutchy	7-2	28.89
5th	Bens Court	3-1	28.90
6th	Lenson Express	7-1	28.98

Heat 3 (26 Jun)
Pos	Name	SP	Time
1st	Kanes Blue	10-1	28.83
2nd	Ullid Conor	8-1	28.99
3rd	Blakes World	50-1	29.02
4th	Fear Me	9-2	29.16
5th	Blonde Jeannie	8-1	29.24
6th	Phoenix Paddy	1-2f	00.00

Heat 4 (26 Jun)
Pos	Name	SP	Time
1st	Loyal Honcho	9-4	28.46
2nd	Westmead Lord	9-4	28.76
3rd	Caulry Fast Trap	25-1	28.88
4th	Calzaghe Boyo	50-1	29.08
5th	Express Ego	2-1f	29.18
6th	Nervous Woody	5-1	29.62

== Semi finals ==
First Semi Final (30 Jun)
Pos	Name of Greyhound	SP	Time	Trainer
1st	Ullid Conor	2-1	28.90	Hennessy
2nd	Forest Scholes	5-1	28.93	McKenna
3rd	Westmead Lord	4-5f	29.15	Savva
4th	Ballymac Charley	10-1	29.41	Lister
5th	Blakes World	16-1	29.65	Burridge
N/R	Farloe Premier			Lister

Second Semi Final (30 Jun)
Pos	Name of Greyhound	SP	Time	Trainer
1st	Dilemmas Flight	7-2	28.74	Savva
2nd	Loyal Honcho	10-11f	28.94	Graham
3rd	Caulry Fast Trap	25-1	29.02	McNair
4th	Greenwell Storm	6-1	29.20	Flaherty
5th	Kanes Blue	14-1	29.26	Allsopp
6th	Directors Chair	4-1	29.32	Wallis

== See also ==
- 2007 UK & Ireland Greyhound Racing Year
