= Sidaz Jack =

Male Greyhound

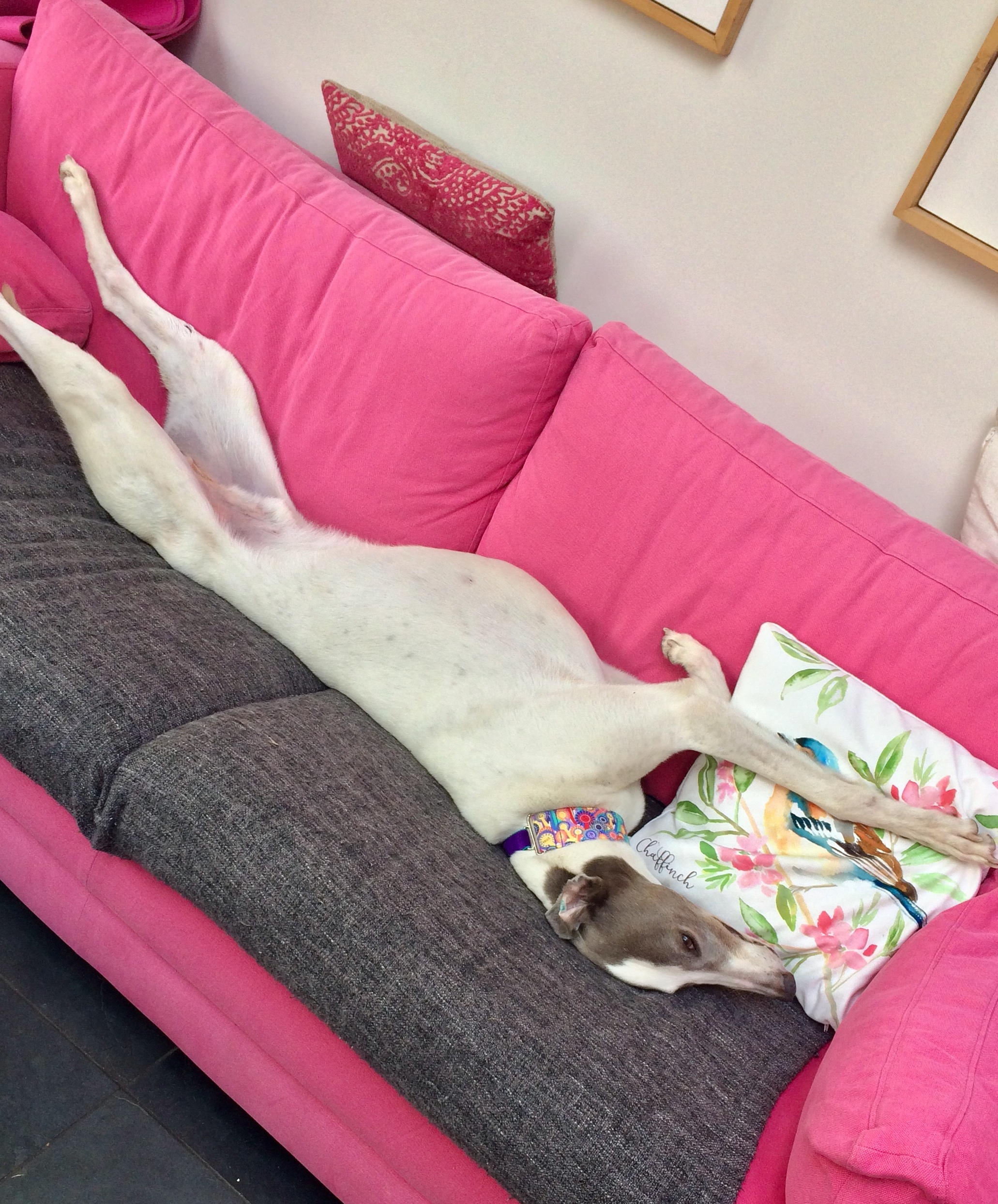
- Sidaz Jack in retirement, May 2019
- Sire: Westmead Hawk
- Dam: Ballaghboy Cool
- Sex: Dog
- Whelped: 8 June 2011 (age 15)
- Color: White and blue
- Breeder: Jerry Moloney
- Owner: Daren Johnson; Simon Wooder
- Trainer: Charlie Lister OBE

Awards
- Derby champion

Other awards
- 2013 Standard greyhound of the year

Sidaz Jack (8 June 2011– 13 March 2025) was a white and blue male greyhound. He was owned by Daren Johnson and Simon Wooder, and trained by Charlie Lister. He won the English Greyhound Derby in 2013. His father was two time English Greyhound Derby winner Westmead Hawk.

== Racing career ==
Sidaz Jack was sired by Westmead Hawk from the dam Ballaghboy Cool and was born on 8 June 2011. Westmead Hawk was a two-time English Greyhound Derby winner. Sidaz Jack has a white body with grey markings on the head.

Sidaz Jack was entered into the 2013 English Greyhound Derby and won two of the qualifying races en route to the final. He went into the final race at odds of 6–1, behind the favourite Droopys Jet who was at 7–4. He was placed in the first trap, and won the race by a length and a quarter from Airlie Impact in 28.37 seconds. His victory earned £150,000 for his owners Daren Johnson and Simon Wooder and was the seventh victory in the competition for trainer Charlie Lister.

Following his victory at the English Derby, he was rumoured to be entering in the 2013 Irish Greyhound Derby with bookmakers Paddy Power making him their 10-1 favourite before the closing date for entries. However he wasn't entered in the competition, and the owners instead intended to enter him in the Ladbrokes Gold Cup. Sidaz Jack was injured in September 2013 and was withdrawn from the East Anglian Derby at Yarmouth Stadium prior to the quarter final, and it was decided to rest him in preparation for the 2014 racing season. Lister had checked him following an earlier round and found the back of one of his front legs was bruised, which he thought might have occurred during the race.

== Retirement ==
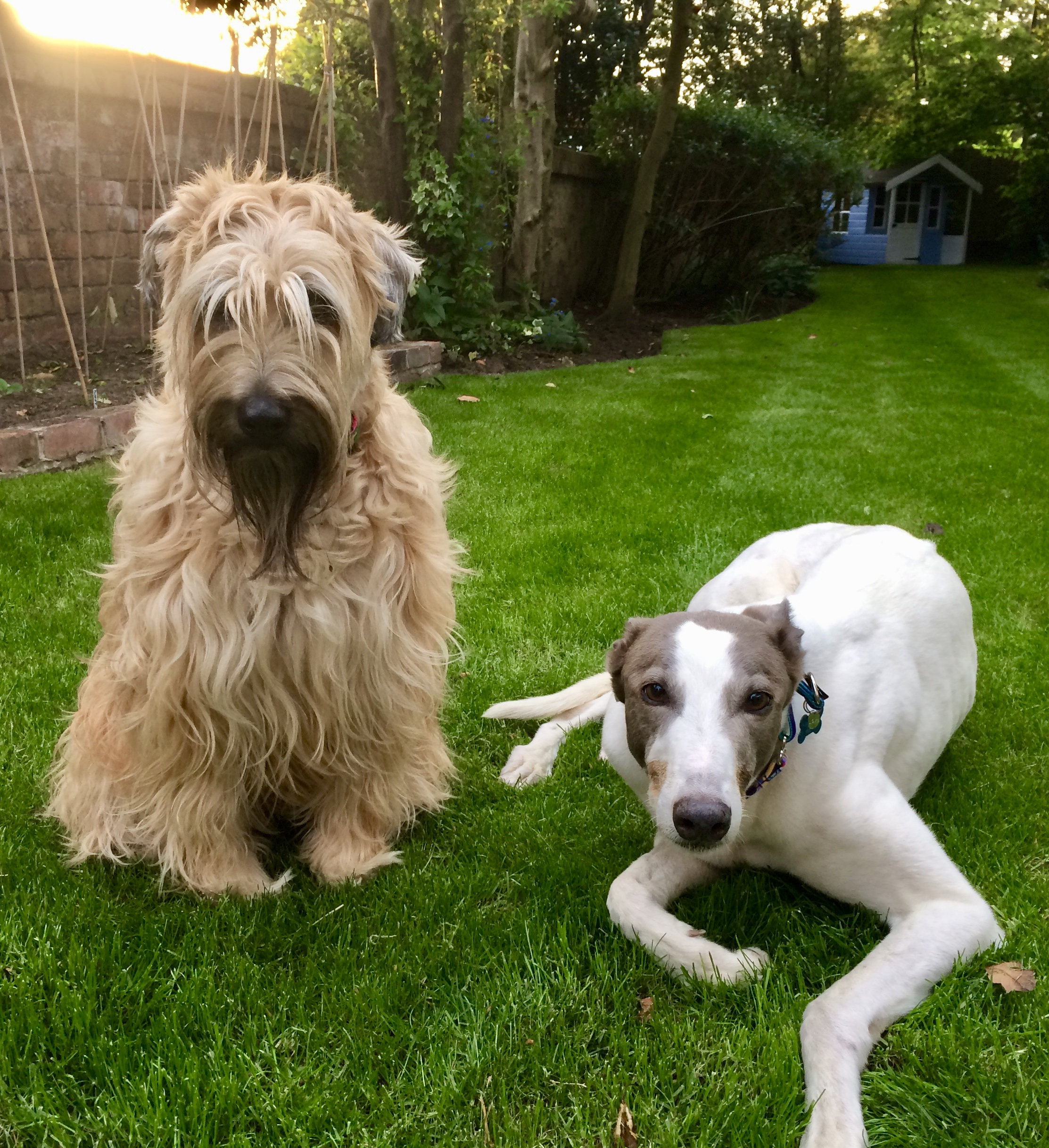
Sidaz Jack with housemate Pebbles, Summer 2019

In March 2019, Sidaz Jack retired to a family in the northwest of England. He enjoyed squirrel watching and croquet. Sidaz Jack ("Dazzle") died peacefully on 13 March 2025.

== Pedigree ==
Frightful Flash
Sonic Flight
Westmead Flight
Westmead Hawk
Smooth Rumble
Mega Delight
Knockeevan Joy
Sidaz Jack
Just The Best
Big Daddy Cool
Sobbing Sal
Ballaghboy Cool
Larkhill Jo
Sues Beauty
Marinas Vintage
