= 2006 UK & Ireland Greyhound Racing Year =

2006 UK & Ireland Greyhound Racing Year was the 81st year of greyhound racing in the United Kingdom and the 80th year of greyhound racing in Ireland.

== Summary ==
The 2005 English Greyhound Derby champion Westmead Hawk became only the fourth greyhound in history to win the Derby for a second time emulating the achievement of Mick the Miller (1929 & 1930), Patricias Hope (1972 & 1973) and Rapid Ranger (2000 & 2001). Returning from winter rest the Nick Savva trained greyhound lost to Fear Me, in the final of the BGRB Scottish Derby before creating his own piece of history.

Westmead Hawk suffered a serious injury later in the year which resulted in him missing the 2006 Irish Greyhound Derby, an event that was won by Razldazl Billy trained by Dolores Ruth. Westmead Hawk was duly voted the Greyhound of the Year. Charlie Lister was Greyhound Trainer of the Year.

=== Tracks ===
Rye House Stadium, built in 1935, closed for good on the 15 November, just two years after re-opening.

=== Competitions ===
The battle between the countries two top staying (longer distance) greyhounds continued; Greenacre Lin defeated Roxholme Girl in the Golden Jacket final and then Roxholme Girl gained revenge by winning the William Hill TV Trophy. Greenacre Lin won the Cesarewitch and then Roxholme Girl headed for Manchester and claimed victory in the Gold Collar. They both bypassed the Grand Prix which was won by January Tiger trained by Mark Wallis, who had five of the finalists. Greenacre Lin was retired form racing in September and was voted stayer of the year.

=== News ===
GRA track Wimbledon lost four trainers during the course of the year. Seamus Cahill and Paul Garland both moved to Walthamstow Stadium followed by Ray Peacock and John Walsh leaving for Romford and Harlow respectively. Two replacements were Jason Foster from Oxford and Paul Donovan from Reading Stadium.

Walthamstow also appointed new trainers in Peter Rich and Kelly Mullins (son of Linda Mullins). Coincidentally earlier in the year Kelly's brother John Mullins had left Walthamstow to concentrate solely on operating an open-race kennel at Capel St. Mary. Oxford's leading trainer Nick Colton joined sister track Hall Green.

An article by the News of the World on the use of cocaine in society also suggests its use is rife in greyhound racing. The National Greyhound Racing Club responds with evidence that in over 70,000 samples taken during the year only four returned positive for cocaine (three of which were from human contamination) leaving just one case. The newspaper failed to print a retraction or apology.

== Roll of honour ==
Major Winners
Award	Name of Winner
2006 English Greyhound Derby	Westmead Hawk
2006 Irish Greyhound Derby	Razldazl Billy
Greyhound Trainer of the Year	Charlie Lister
Greyhound of the Year	Westmead Hawk
Irish Dog and Bitch of the Year	Razldazl Billy / Shelbourne Becky

Betfair Trainers Championship, Wimbledon (Mar 14)
Pos	Name of Trainer	Points
1st	Mark Wallis	56
2nd	Charlie Lister	39
3rd	Brian Clemenson	35
4th	David Pruhs	28
5th	Nick Savva	26
6th	Paul Young	23

=== Principal UK finals ===
William Hill TV Trophy, Belle Vue (Mar 28, 878m, £6,000)
Pos	Name of Greyhound	Trainer	SP	Time	Trap
1st	Roxholme Girl	Carly Philpott	55.86	4-5f	2
2nd	Head Iton Jordan	Steve Race	55.94	33-1	5
3rd	Greenacre Lin	Brian Clemenson	56.36	4-1	1
4th	Rosshill View	Chris Allsopp	56.50	9-2	4
5th	Droopys Aoife	Bernie Doyle	56.76	12-1	3
6th	Shes The Deal	Paul Young	56.90	12-1	6

BGRB Scottish Derby, Shawfield (Apr 8, 480m, £25,000)
Pos	Name of Greyhound	Trainer	SP	Time	Trap
1st	Fear Me	Charlie Lister	7-4jf	29.21	3
2nd	Westmead Hawk	Nick Savva	3-1	29.25	4
3rd	Ballymac Niloc	Carly Philpott	7-4jf	29.55	1
4th	Malbay Nikita	Alexander Mills	33-1	29.59	5
5th	Teds Anchor	Julie Bateson	10-1	29.61	2
6th	Ballymac Magnet	Carly Philpott	12-1	29.87	6

William Hill Cesarewitch, Oxford (Jun 13, 645m, £5,000)
Pos	Name of Greyhound	Trainer	SP	Time	Trap
1st	Greenacre Lin	Brian Clemenson	11-10f	39.85	3
2nd	Caloona Striker	Wayne Wrighting	5-1	40.01	4
3rd	Daisyfield Seani	Mark Wallis	10-1	40.25	5
4th	Princessmonalulu	Brian Clemenson	3-1	40.28	6
5th	Coup Detat	Cherie Llewellyn	33-1	40.37	1
6th	Zigzag Stewart	June McCombe	4-1	40.83	2

Betfair Scurry Cup, Perry Barr (Aug 22, 275m, £8,000)
Pos	Name of Greyhound	Trainer	SP	Time	Trap
1st	Ballymac Rooster	Carly Philpott	7-4	16.08	6
2nd	Roxholme Freddie	Carly Philpott	1-1f	16.26	4
3rd	Belindas Company	Ray Evans	10-1	16.41	2
4th	Blonde Joey	John Mullins	12-1	16.62	5
5th	Rhincrew Simba	Charlie Lister	3-1	16.65	3
N/R	Blonde Jet	Maria Dennis			

Totesport Gold Collar, Belle Vue (Aug 29, 590m, £10,000)
Pos	Name of Greyhound	Trainer	SP	Time	Trap
1st	Roxholme Girl	Carly Philpott	8-15f	35.14	1
2nd	Westmead Aoifa	Nick Savva	6-1	35.44	6
3rd	Westmead Swift	Nick Savva	6-1	35.50	5
4th	Teds Anchor	Julie Bateson	9-2	35.84	2
5th	Halcrow Prince	Julie Bateson	16-1	35.98	4
6th	Thunderbird Two	Graham Hutt	16-1	36.10	3

VC Bet Grand Prix, Walthamstow (Sep 30, 640m, £10,000)
Pos	Name of Greyhound	Trainer	SP	Time	Trap
1st	January Tiger	Mark Wallis	9-2	39.47	6
2nd	Fear Robben	Mark Wallis	11-4	39.59	1
3rd	Blackmagic Guy	Mark Wallis	14-1	39.61	2
4th	Daisyfield Seani	Mark Wallis	2-1f	40.05	4
5th	Westmead Swift	Nick Savva	5-2	40.09	5
6th	Go Commando	Mark Wallis	14-1	40.81	3

Reading Masters, Reading (Oct 1, 465m, £20,000)
Pos	Name of Greyhound	Trainer	SP	Time	Trap
1st	Farloe Rio	Paul Hennessy	5-2	28.13	3
2nd	Noirs Ted	Seamus Cahill	8-1	28.23	6
3rd	Geordie Parker	Charlie Lister	5-4f	28.25	5
4th	Toms View	Charlie Lister	4-1	28.49	4
5th	Farloe Focus	Charlie Lister	33-1	28.59	2
6th	Zigzag Dutchy	Charlie Lister	4-1	28.91	1

Betfair Grand National, Wimbledon (Oct 3, 460mH, £7,500)
Pos	Name of Greyhound	Trainer	SP	Time	Trap
1st	Suit Man	Bernie Doyle	13-8f	28.30	6
2nd	Baran Geronimo	Tom Foster	14-1	28.34	4
3rd	Jills Fault	Paul Sallis	5-1	28.43	5
4th	Snazzy Time	Seamus Cahill	5-1	28.71	3
5th	Druids Sully	Norah McEllistrim	5-1	28.72	1
6th	Custom Paul	Jason Foster	9-2	28.79	2

William Hill Laurels, Belle Vue (Oct 24, 470m, £10,000)
Pos	Name of Greyhound	Trainer	SP	Time	Trap
1st	Clash Harmonica	Charlie Lister	3-1	27.88	1
2nd	Fantasy Tiger	Stuart Buckland	12-1	27.92	2
3rd	Dalcash Sweettea	Ken Bebbington	12-1	27.96	3
4th	Fear Haribo	Hayley Keightley	5-4f	28.00	4
5th	Manic Mile	Graham Hutt	9-2	28.08	5
6th	Noirs Duke	Otto Kueres	7-1	28.18	6

William Hill St Leger, Wimbledon (Nov 7, 668m, £13,000)
Pos	Name of Greyhound	Trainer	SP	Time	Trap
1st	Ninja Blue	Charlie Lister	11-4	41.52	5
2nd	Westmead Olivia	Nick Savva	5-1	41.53	4
3rd	Blissful Classic	Tony Collett	7-1	41.57	6
4th	Fabulous Sophie	Charlie Lister	7-2	41.74	1
5th	Blackmagic Guy	Mark Wallis	10-1	41.75	3
6th	Daisyfield Seani	Mark Wallis	9-4f	42.04	2

William Hill Oaks, Wimbledon (Nov 28, 480m, £6,000)
Pos	Name of Greyhound	Trainer	SP	Time	Trap
1st	Dilemmas Flight	Nick Savva	7-1	28.96	2
2nd	Cleenas Lady	Terry Dartnall	11-8f	29.04	1
3rd	Jazz Hurricane	Derek Knight	5-1	29.07	6
4th	Chakalak Paris	Paul Young	20-1	29.26	5
5th	Deanridge Vixen	Ian Reilly	2-1	29.76	4
6th	Africa	Mark Wallis	25-1	29.79	3

=== Principal Irish finals ===
Donal Reilly Easter Cup Shelbourne (Apr 8, 525y, €50,000)
Pos	Name of Greyhound	SP	Time	Trap
1st	Ahane Lad	5-2	28.21	2
2nd	Charity Jack	10-1	28.66	5
3rd	Roisins Dessie	9-4f	28.70	1
4th	Dead Set	6-1	28.75	4
5th	Tyrur Fracas	7-1	28.77	6
6th	Mineola Zeus	4-1	28.91	3

Red Mills Produce Clonmel (Apr 30, 525y, €30,000)
Pos	Name of Greyhound	SP	Time	Trap
1st	Eskimo Jack	4-1	28.54	6
2nd	Large Mac	9-4	28.99	1
3rd	Jacksheaboy	5-1	29.06	3
4th	Emporio Diego	14-1	29.07	5
5th	Nut Cracker	7-1	29.28	2
6th	Jeffs Star	2-1f	29.63	4

Kerry Agribusiness Irish St Leger Limerick (Jun 24, 550y, €35,000)
Pos	Name of Greyhound	SP	Time	Trap
1st	Indesacjack	4-1	29.66	4
2nd	Coolboy George	5-2f	29.69	1
3rd	Smoking Again	5-1	30.25	5
4th	Alimo	4-1	29.66	2
5th	Wizard Dream	8-1	30.33	6
6th	Dalcash Sweettea	3-1	30.40	3

Sporting Press Oaks Shelbourne (Jul 8, 525y, €35,000)
Pos	Name of Greyhound	SP	Time	Trap
1st	Shelbourne Becky	5-2	28.58	5
2nd	Tyrur Kitten	11-10f	28.68	2
3rd	Smooth Surface	14-1	28.86	4
4th	Borna Magic	5-1	29.00	6
5th	Girl With Guitar	6-1	29.07	1
N/R	Early Talent			3

Boylesports Champion Stakes Shelbourne (Jul 29, 550y, €40,000)
Pos	Name of Greyhound	SP	Time	Trap
1st	Large Mac	7-1	29.76	3
2nd	Droopys Wells	6-1	29.93	4
3rd	Tyrur Ted	3-1	29.99	6
4th	Ravenswood Ross	16-1	30.13	1
5th	Tyrur Paddy	2-1f	30.20	2
6th	Good Dog Jack	3-1	00.00	5

HX Bookmakers Puppy Derby Harolds Cross (Oct 6, 525y, €35,000)
Pos	Name of Greyhound	SP	Time	Trap
1st	Oran Majestic	7-2	28.71	4
2nd	Winetavern Henry	8-1	28.81	1
3rd	Rusheen Honcho	6-1	28.88	2
4th	Droopys Mal	1-1f	29.16	3
5th	Evans Joy	10-1	29.34	6
6th	Barnfield On Air	11-2	29.93	5

Cashmans Laurels Cork (Oct 21, 525y, €35,000)
Pos	Name of Greyhound	SP	Time	Trap
1st	Ardkill Jamie	5-2	28.65	1
2nd	Droopys Electric	9-4f	28.67	3
3rd	Disco Stu	9-2	28.88	2
4th	Tyrur Lee	9-2	29.09	4
5th	Oran Premier	11-2	29.33	5
N/R	Tyrur Ted			6
