= Henlow Stadium =

Former greyhound racing venue in England

- Interactive map of Henlow Stadium
- Location: Bedford Road, Lower Stondon, Henlow SG16 6EA
- Coordinates: 51°46′19″N 0°03′49″E

Construction
- Opened: 1927
- Closed: 2024

Tenant
- Greyhound racing

Henlow Stadium was a greyhound racing stadium located at Stondon, in the English county of Bedfordshire, slightly to the north of Hitchin. The stadium had a restaurant, a number of bars and a bistro.

Racing formerly took place every Monday and Thursday morning, on Tuesday evenings and on Saturday and Sunday afternoons.

== History ==
=== 20th Century ===
During the boom time of greyhound racing in 1927 Henlow was one of many tracks appearing around Britain, the site at Henlow Camp was previously a straights track starting in 1923. Racing got underway on 1 August 1927 but the track was to remain independent (unlicensed) for nearly fifty years. The stadium located on the Bedford Road, Lower Stondon in an area known as Henlow Camp named after the First World War RAF Henlow but now a civilian settlement. In the early days of racing the hare was a drag lure driven by a lorry wheel and racing was watched from the Ickleford side of the track. There were issues in the early thirties when due to the popularity of Sunday racing the crowds unintentionally but continually blocked the main road when frequenting the track. In 1935 the track licence changed hands from H.E Day to A.A Furr.

Henlow remained a popular flapping track and had a capacity of just 1,000 spectators after the Second World War following a switch of viewing facilities to the other side of the track still used today. In the late fifties the Smith family took over the running of the track and in the late sixties racing was held on Monday and Friday evenings at 7.45pm over distances of 350, 530 and 880 yards. The circumference was 470 yards and the principal event was the Henlow Derby. There was an inside Sumner hare on an all sand track with seven bookmakers on site. Totalisator and photo finish had also been installed.

In 1974 Come on Wonder (full litter brother to Dolores Rocket) broke track records at West Ham Stadium and Crayford & Bexleyheath Stadium before being disqualified and going on to race on the independent circuits winning the Henlow Derby. It was not until 1976 that the opportunity arose to race under the National Greyhound Racing Club permit rules, SW Smith was the General Manager and Dave Smith was the Racing Manager. Track changes resulted in the circumference being made considerably smaller, the 412 circumference hosted distances of 318, 484, 730 and 890 metres, the third and fourth bends retained a rather odd shape in the process.

In 1992 Patsy Cusack steered Pennys Best to the 1992 English Greyhound Derby final. and in January 1994 Jock McNaughton a Strathclyde man bought the track from the Smith family, McNaughton had previously been a permit trainer at Rye House Stadium and Henlow and as a boy had raced at Blantyre. The track changed again when Tony McDonnell bought the lease under the name of Henlow Racing Ltd and undertook several refurbishment projects. McDonnell would be General Manager and he bring in an ex-trainer Keith Mellor as the Racing Manager. McDonnell continued to run the track but changes were made on the management front, Keith Woolsey became General Manager and Paul Mellor (son of Keith) Racing Manager.

=== 21st Century ===
In 2006 a new restaurant was constructed in the stadium, at a cost of £464,000. Henlow Stadium won the 2007 English Greyhound Derby trophy with Westmead Lord trained from the Nick Savva kennel and owned by the Morton family.

Businessman Bob Morton (known for owning Westmead Hawk) purchased the track from Tony McDonnell in 2008 along with Kevin Boothby who took a half share. Morton and Boothby had saved the track from potential development but Morton moved back to the Channel Islands in 2012 leaving Kevin Boothby in sole control.

Rio Quattro won the richest ever prize in greyhound racing in 2015 when the Daniel Riordan Henlow trained black dog picked up the £250,000 winner's purse for winning the 2015 English Greyhound Derby.

In 2018 the stadium signed a deal with SIS to race every Monday morning, Tuesday evening, Thursday morning and Sunday afternoon. Leading trainer Mark Wallis joined the track during August 2018.

In 2020 local planners agreed to plans for the site being developed. The lease held by Kevin Boothby was due to end in November 2021 but he was seeking a five-year extension. Boothy had already branched out by gaining a 10-year lease at Towcester Greyhound Stadium. An appeal in 2023 by Henlow Racing Ltd was ultimately unsuccessful, with a court approving plans to build 75 homes on the site. The Henlow Stadium greyhound racing track closed permanently on 21 January 2024. The facilities will be fully dismantled by 5 April 2024.

== Competitions ==
- Henlow Derby

== Track records ==
=== At closing ===
Metres	Greyhound	Time	Date	Notes
277	Queen Anna	16.23	29 October 2017	
428	Queen Adele	25.15	24 June 2018	
460	Forest Chunk	26.98	3 December 2017	
460 hurdles	Bomber Bailey	28.20	23 July 2009	
550	Roswell Romanov	32.86	25 March 2018	
692	Dazzle Special	42.02	8 March 2010	
842	King Kane	52.66	24.08.2014	
870	Midway Skipper	54.93	13 August 2009	

=== Former track records ===
Extended content

Metres	Greyhound	Time	Date	Notes
250	Night Trooper	15.25	23 November 1998	
250	Night Breeze	15.10	1999	
250	Gamble It	14.96	1 May 2000	
250	Quivers Ace	14.92	7 June 2007	
277	Second Option	16.65	4 April 2008	
277	Minnies Tyrana	16.52	21 May 2009	
277	Droopys Bocelli	16.26	17 December 2009	
318	Ecins Best	19.01	8 September 1980	
318	Chin No Nose	18.97	12 April 1991	
428	Bush Standard	25.56	8 November 2012	
428	Boher Chieftain	25.82	4 October 2012	
428	Aero Babooshka	25.53	22 March 2015	
428	Saffrons Anna	25.50	20 March 2016	
428	Queen Adele	25.33	10 June 2018	
428	Queen Adele	25.26	17 June 2018	
460	Trade Congress	27.65	19 June 1998	
460	Couriers Dream	27.43	18 September 1998	
460	Fear Khan	27.28	25 September 2005	
460	Westmead Osprey	27.25	16 September 2010	
460	Westmead Osprey	27.21	7 October 2010	Henlow Derby heats
460	Taylors Sky	27.21	13 October 2011	Henlow Derby heats
460	Taylors Sky	27.08	20 October 2011	Henlow Derby semi-finals
460	Mays King	27.05	01 June 2014	
460	Rio Quattro	=27.05	19 October 2014	
484	Raheen Rudie	29.12	March 1986	
484	Westmead Call	29.12	10 October 1986	Henlow Derby final
484	Cannongrand	29.08	25 October 1989	
550	Westmead Baron	33.35	18 May 2001	
550	Little Honcho	33.30	25 April 2005	
550	Westmead Liz	33.25	2 January 2006	
550	Questhouse Ellie	33.10	24 April 2006	
550	Westmead Bolt	33.07	20 October 2011	
550	Airport Captain	32.94	21 July 2013	
550	Jet Stream Sound	32.87	16 August 2015	
680	Snow Shoes	42.14	25 November 1991	
680	Shebas Lass	42.87	29 October 1990	
680	Snow Shoes	42.60	20 November 1991	
680	Fortunate Man	42.51	20 November 1991	
680	Snow Shoes	42.14	25 November 1991	
660	Lobo	40.21	15 October 1999	
692	Ard Beauty	42.31	23 April 2009	
730	Chicita Banana	44.96	13 June 1990	
730	Blue Shirt	45.50	18 June 1984	
730	Tarnwood Snowdrop	45.22	1988	
730	Chicita Banana	44.96	13 June 1990	
870	Tiptree Poker	55.31	27 October 1997	
870	Betathan Pebbles	54.95	30 October 2005	
890	Clydes Dolores	57.20	22 February 1988	
890	Cregagh Prince	57.29	1987	
