= Monmore Green Stadium =

British greyhound racing venue

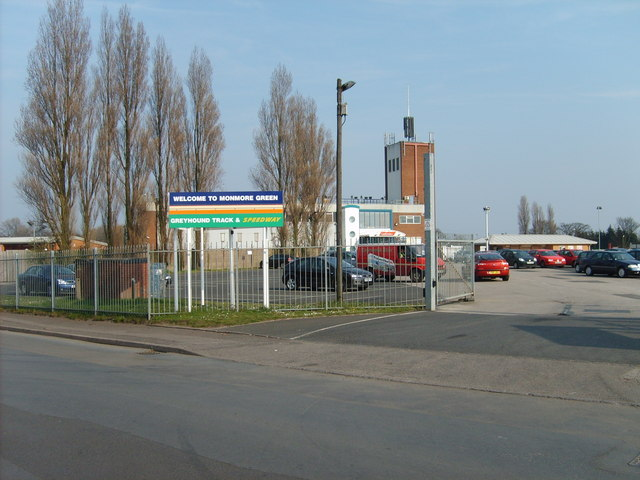
- The entrance to the stadium in 2007
- Interactive map of Monmore Green Stadium
- Location: Wolverhampton, England
- Coordinates: 52°34′37.71″N 2°6′6.73″W
- Operator: Entain (Ladbrokes Coral)

Construction
- Opened: 1928

Website
- monmoregreyhounds.com

Monmore Green Stadium is a greyhound racing and former motorcycle speedway stadium located in Wolverhampton. The stadium has private suites, a restaurant and a number of bars. The venue is owned and operated by Entain Group.

== Speedway ==
Motorcycle speedway was raced on Monday nights with the Wolverhampton Wolves competing in the top division of the sport. The speedway track at Monmore Green is 264 metres (289 yards) long.

== Greyhound racing ==
Matinée races take place on Monday, Tuesday, Wednesday and Fridays with evening race meetings on Thursday and Saturday nights. The track hosts several major races including the Ladbrokes Gold Cup, Ladbrokes Puppy Derby, Ladbrokes Festival 630's, Ladbrokes Summer Cup and from 2015 the prestigious puppy competition the Trafalgar Cup.

The track features prominently in the song "Monmore, Hare's Running" on the 1997 album Voyage to the Bottom of the Road by the band Half Man Half Biscuit.

=== History ===
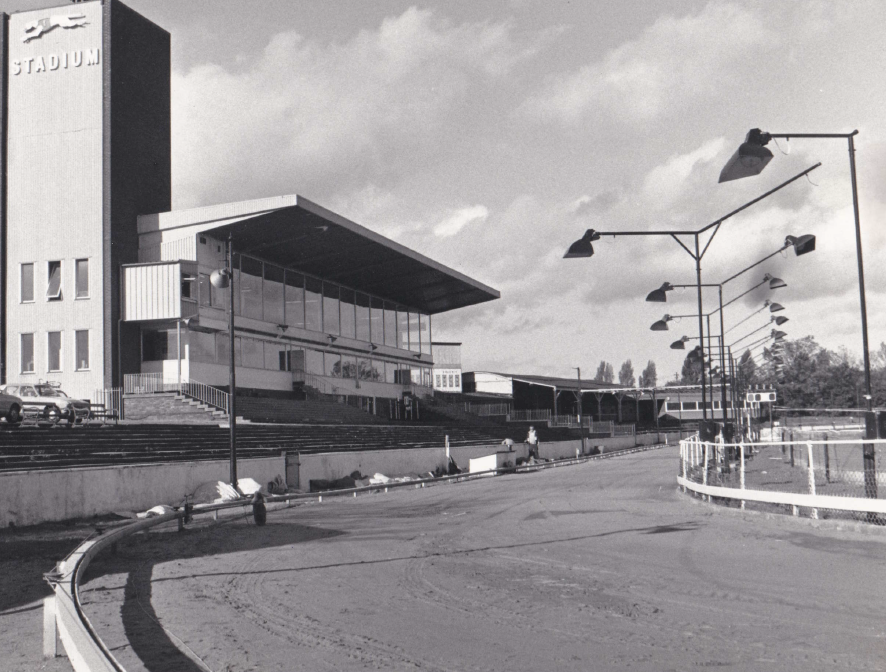
Monmore Green Stadium, Wolverhampton c.1970

==== 20th Century ====
Monmore opened in 1928 south-east of Wolverhampton and south of the Sutherland Road between the Great Western Railway line and East Park (a large sculptured park and gardens). The official opening night was Wednesday 11 January 1928 organised by a company called the Midland Greyhound Racing Association. A 10,000 strong crowd witnessed the seven races including two hurdle events and the first greyhound to win a race was Arrow Tranby winning one of the 500 yards races in a time of 32.08 secs at odds of 6-1 when winning the Shirley Stakes.

In 1935, the large resident Monmore kennels were split into two sections and also served Willenhall Greyhound Stadium. Unlike many tracks Monmore remained open during the majority of the war and introduced the Midland Puppy Championship in 1943, which would become the Midland Puppy Derby and then the Ladbrokes Puppy Derby (not to be confused with the more prestigious Puppy Derby held at Wimbledon Stadium). The company ran a policy of having joint Racing Managers covering both Monmore and Willenhall. In the fifties Peter Cartwright left his position as Racing Manager to join the National Greyhound Racing Club and was replaced by Bob Harwood. Further competitions were introduced at the track that included the Midland St Leger, Midland Classic Potential, Pride of the Midlands and Staffordshire Knot.

In 1963, a devastating fire swept through the main grandstand resulting in the closure of the track for a considerable period whilst repairs were made. The annual Midland Puppy Championship had to be switched to Willenhall. The fire instigated a major change with the grandstand undergoing significant investment in the mid-sixties to include an ultra-modern glass fronted restaurant with tiered viewing and waitress service. It brought the facilities up to date and attracted outside interest from the Totalisators and Greyhound Holdings (TGH). In 1970 TGH purchased Willenhall and Monmore from the Midland Greyhound Racing Co Ltd to add to the existing tracks of Crayford & Bexleyheath, Gosforth, Leeds and Brough Park that they already owned. Four years later in 1974 Ladbrokes bought out TGH and added another racetrack Perry Barr. Arthur Aldridge became Racing Director for Ladbrokes and following the 1981 decimation of horse racing fixtures due to bad weather the track held BAGS (Bookmakers’ Afternoon Greyhound Service) fixtures for the first time.

The track's resident kennels were demolished in the late eighties making way for the contract trainer system and Jim Woods arrived from Nottingham Greyhound Stadium to take over as Racing Manager with Bob Harwood General Manager. The stadium hosted the Golden Jacket classic race in 1986 before it moved to Crayford Stadium and a pre-war event the Midland Gold Cup returned in 1994. The stadium underwent changes in 1996 including a change of hare system from a Sumner to a Swaffham and a major track redesign creating new race distances.

==== 21st Century ====
2011 was a very successful year for the track when they won the BAGS National Track Championship and trainer Chris Allsopp became champion trainer. In 2013, Jim Woods retired after a 31-year career handing the reigns to Tony Williamson who had served for twenty years as Wood's assistant. The prestigious Trafalgar Cup competition was held for the first time in 2015.

In 2018 the stadium signed a deal with SIS to race every Monday, Tuesday, Wednesday and Friday afternoon and every Thursday and Saturday evening. Leading trainer Kevin Hutton joined the track in August 2018.

In 2022, Entain signed a long term deal with the Arena Racing Company for media rights, starting in January 2024. In 2023, the stadium owners announced that speedway would cease after the 2023 season.

=== Major competitions ===
- Ladbrokes Gold Cup
- Ladbrokes Puppy Derby
- Trafalgar Cup
- Ladbrokes Summer Stayers Classic

=== Track records ===
==== Current ====
Metres	Greyhound	Time	Date	Notes
210	Crossfield Larry	12.34	9 September 2023	
264	Jetharts Here	14.95	8 September 2007	
416	Southfield Jock	24.01	4 December 2015	
480	Ballymac Eske	27.48	28 June 2012	
630	Iceman Brutus	37.07	20 August 2007	Ladbrokes Gold Cup heats
684	Mongys Wild	40.41	17 May 2025	TV Trophy Final
835	Slick Strauss	51.00	17 August 2017	

==== Previous (post-metric) ====
Extended content

Metres	Greyhound	Time	Date	Notes
210	Cry Havoc	12.64	20 March 1997	
210	Andlyns Asabat	12.45	8 May 2014	
264	Parliament Act	15.32	28 August 2001	
264	Boher Chief	15.30	27 May 2004	
264	La Galga	15.24	11 August 2005	
264	La Galga	15.23	26 August 2005	
264	Winnies Dancer	15.22	8 October 2005	
264	Ningbo Jack	15.09	12 June 2006	
264	Paid Boss	15.08	24 August 2007	
277	Cross Bar	16.66	19 April 1984	
277	Fearless Champ	16.34	9 November 1985	
416	Devitos Chance	24.96	10 December 1997	
416	Moynies Cash	24.57	3 July 2004	
416	Woodcroft Jo	24.51	4 September 2004	
416	Belindas Company	24.33	23 September 2006	
416	Funtime Chunky	24.33	24 August 2007	
416	Last Mohican	24.30	5 July 2008	
416	Loughbeag Roopy	24.22	26 June 2010	
416	Guinness Sky	24.21	24 June 2013	
460	Larkhill Jo	27.15	10 April 1997	
462	Hume Silver	28.15	14 April 1984	
462	Fearless Champ	28.12	18 January 1986	
480	Larkhill Jo	27.95	7 July 1997	Midland Gold Cup semi-final
480	Knocktoosh Queen	27.93	9 August 2003	
480	Express Hancho	27.91	23 August 2003	Ladbrokes Gold Cup semi-finals
480	Westmead Eagle	27.85	17 March 2005	
480	Ballymac Pires	27.82	17 March 2005	Ladbrokes Puppy Derby final
480	Blonde Dino	27.81	8 September 2007	
480	Ballymac Ruso	27.79	6 December 2008	
480	Bandicoot Tipoki	27.76	12 March 2009	Ladbrokes Puppy Derby heats
480	Farloe Lee	=27.76	12 March 2009	Ladbrokes Puppy Derby heats
480	Target Classic	27.71	7 December 2009	
480	Farley Blitz	27.60	13 February 2010	
484	Duke of Avon	29.22	5 July 1979	
484	Keen Mint	29.55	11 October 1982	
484	Fearless Power	29.26	8 November 1986	
484	Darragh Commet	29.08	11 February 1989	
484	Heres Andy	29.00	5 July 1996	last 484 record
630	Spring Rose	37.90	10 May 1997	
630	Slippy Elite	37.81	28 November 1998	
630	Form of Magic	37.56	16 May 2002	Ladbrokes Summer Stayers Classic heats
630	Marmions	37.42	20 May 2004	Ladbrokes Summer Stayers Classic semi
630	Westmead Hawk	37.08	20 May 2005	
647	Telecomm Tiger	40.42	18 October 1986	
647	Catunda Flame	40.33	8 July 1989	
647	Easy Bimbo	40.18	13 July 1991	
647	Highmoor Glen	40.10	10 July 1993	
684	True Honcho	41.03	14 April 2001	
692	Desert Fame	43.41	25 April 1984	
692	Miss Bluebird	43.37	29 October 1985	
815	Lizzies Girl	52.16	23 April 1975	BBC TV Trophy Final
815	Scurlogue Champ	51.80	15 May 1985	BBC TV Trophy heats
815	Scurlogue Champ	51.64	22 May 1985	BBC TV Trophy final
835	Spenwood Gem	52.09	17 September 1998	
835	Knappogue Oak	52.09	28 August 2001	
835	Minglers Moth	52.01	15 August 2002	
835	Hesley Gale	51.95	27 May 2004	
835	Head Iton Tonge	51.60	21 June 2007	
835	Flying Winner	51.26	29 August 2009	
880	Thornfield Pride	54.79	19 July 1997	
900	Make It Not	58.05	5 November 1983	
900	Angelas Girl		April 1983	
900	Lilac Wonder	57.83	5 December 1992	
900	Ladys Storm	57.02	9 July 1998	
900	Aayamza Royale	55.95	27 February 2021	
900	Aayamza Royale	55.00	22 May 2021	TV Trophy final
1067	Belladare	70.74	9 May 1987	
1067	Coverall	70.34	29 October 1990	
1104	Travel Now	72.66	25 March 2000	
460 H	James Wish	28.19	1998	
480 H	Brave Ruler	28.88	26 July 1999	
484 H	Distant Echo	30.54	18 July 1987	
484 H	Nifty Kid	30.32	28 November 1988	
484 H	Run On King	30.09	10 April 1991	
647 H	Tebroc Heathen	42.60	20 April 1989	

==== Previous (pre-metric) ====
Extended content

Yards	Greyhound	Time	Date	Notes
300	General Radiance	17.22	27 May 1937	
300	Hurry Kitty	17.17	8 November 1945	
475	Neidins Bunty	27.53	23 March 1939	
475	Coynes Castle	27.14	8 August 1946	
500	Rushton Mac		1954	
500	Lucky Joan	28.10	October 1962	
525	Kilpeacon Bride	30.09	5 February 1944	
525	Red Captain	29.34	April 1965	
525	Aughrim Glen	29.19	1970	
650	Derry Fame	37.04	June 1964	
650	Hogans Express	37.04	1970	=equalled
700	Half Term	40.79	14 October 1944	
700	Clahane Girl	40.05	September 1962	
700	Forward King	39.82	September 1967	Steward's Cup final
880	Chantilly Lace	51.80	April 1960	
880	Old Irish	51.10	1970	
525 H	Baytown Express	30.90	29 October 1944	
525 H	Coast Raider	30.60	September 1957	
