= 2005 UK & Ireland Greyhound Racing Year =

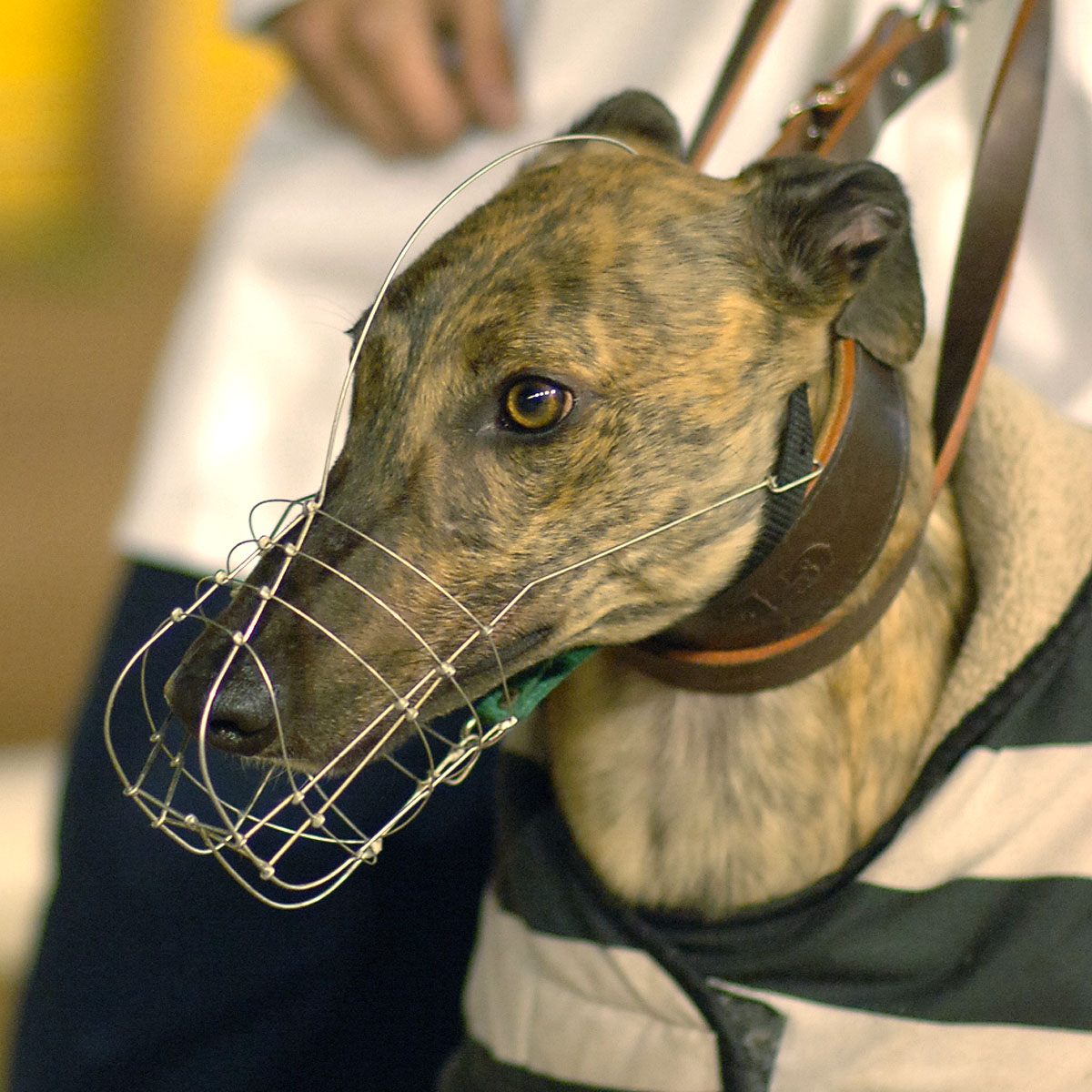
- 2005 Grand Prix champion Clonbrien Show

2005 UK & Ireland Greyhound Racing Year was the 80th year of greyhound racing in the United Kingdom and the 79th year of greyhound racing in Ireland.

== Summary ==
Westmead Hawk captured the public's imagination with his 'late charge' style of running and won the 2005 English Greyhound Derby. The Nick Savva trained greyhound was later voted as the Greyhound of the Year and Mark Wallis secured the Greyhound Trainer of the Year at the end of his maiden year as a trainer.

The 2005 Irish Greyhound Derby was considered to be one of the best in modern times with 'He Said So' winning the final that included Westmead Hawk, Droopys Marco and Irish Dog of the Year Droopys Maldini.

=== Tracks ===
Gaming International/BS Group closed Milton Keynes Greyhound Stadium on Boxing Day despite earlier assurances that it would be rebuilt. The company had closed Bristol in 1997 in similar circumstances.

=== Competitions ===
Charlie Lister stopped Brian Clemenson from winning a fourth consecutive Trainers Championship. Robbie De Niro and Ballymac Kewell made the Scottish Greyhound Derby final unbeaten before the latter was withdrawn leaving Robbie De Niro hot favourite but the final saw dual Irish Greyhound Derby finalist Droopys Marco trained by Frazer Black win the £25,000 first prize.

=== News ===
Mick Wheble former Group Racing Manager for Northern Sports was awarded an MBE for services to greyhound racing and charity during the Queen's 2005 Birthday Honours.

Ernie Gaskin retired, with the kennels being taken over by his son Ernest Gaskin Jr. who retained the contract at Walthamstow Stadium, as did Mark Wallis who took over the Linda Jones Imperial Kennels. Linda was a two times champion trainer and had amassed 13 Category One successes before deciding to retire due to ill health.

== Roll of honour ==
Major Winners
Award	Name of Winner
2005 English Greyhound Derby	Westmead Hawk
2005 Irish Greyhound Derby	He Said So
Scottish Greyhound Derby	Droopys Marco
Greyhound Trainer of the Year	Mark Wallis
Greyhound of the Year	Westmead Hawk
Irish Dog and Bitch of the Year	Droopys Maldini / Grayslands Pixie

Betfair Trainers Championship, Perry Barr (Apr 9)
Pos	Name of Trainer	Points
1st	Charlie Lister	55
2nd	Brian Clemenson	50
3rd	Mark Wallis	28
4th	John Mullins	28
5th	Cheryl Miller	27
6th	Paul Young	20

=== Principal UK finals ===
William Hill TV Trophy, Wimbledon (Mar 15, 872m, £6,000)
Pos	Name of Greyhound	Trainer	SP	Time	Trap
1st	Ericas Equity	Paul Young	55.75	5-4f	1
2nd	Ballyneale Best	Ernie Gaskin Sr.	55.81	8-1	4
3rd	Flashing Tone	John Mullins	56.23	8-1	3
4th	Gors Nikita	Doris Bodell	56.29	25-1	6
5th	Blues Fancy	Michael Cliffe	56.41	10-1	5
6th	Foreign Dancer	Mark Wallis	56.43	6-4	2

Totesport Scottish Derby, Shawfield (Apr 2, 480m, £25,000)
Pos	Name of Greyhound	Trainer	SP	Time	Trap
1st	Droopys Marco	Frazer Black	4-1	29.05	6
2nd	Robbie De Niro	Charlie Lister	5-4f	29.19	5
3rd	Ballymac Niloc	Carly Philpott	5-2	29.37	1
4th	Bell Devotion	Charlie Lister	3-1	29.39	2
5th	Barefoot Maestro	Paul Hennessy	12-1	29.69	3
N/R	Ballymac Kewell	Carly Philpott			

William Hill Cesarewitch, Oxford (Jun 7, 645m, £5,000)
Pos	Name of Greyhound	Trainer	SP	Time	Trap
1st	Zigzag Stewart	June McCombe	3-1	39.61	1
2nd	Greenacre Lin	Brian Clemenson	4-7f	39.83	2
3rd	Top Bombin	Paul Young	50-1	39.92	3
4th	Tiler Tom	Nick Colton	8-1	40.03	6
5th	Milldean Clarky	Barry O’Sullivan	8-1	40.10	4
6th	Tino Spark	John Mullins	16-1	40.23	5

Totesport Gold Collar, Belle Vue (Jun 10, 465m, £10,000)
Pos	Name of Greyhound	Trainer	SP	Time	Trap
1st	Bat On	Charlie Lister	4-7f	27.34	1
2nd	Paramount Bullet	Paul Lawrence	14-1	27.52	4
3rd	Elbony Everest	Gerald Ballentine	25-1	27.88	6
4th	Killeigh Grand	Charlie Lister	9-4	27.90	5
5th	Blue Hatton	Bev Heaton	14-1	27.99	3
6th	Lissycasey Flash	Michael Donlon	25-1	28.46	2

Reading Masters, Reading (Jul 24, 465m, £20,000)
Pos	Name of Greyhound	Trainer	SP	Time	Trap
1st	Killeigh Grand	Charlie Lister	1-1f	28.09	5
2nd	Flashing Away	Jo Burridge	7-1	28.43	2
3rd	Black Bower	Mark Wallis	4-1	28.47	6
4th	Agincourt Archer	Carly Philpott	8-1	28.79	4
5th	Vatpack Brandon	Jackie Taylor	8-1	28.82	1
6th	Joint Reaction	David Mullins	10-1	29.02	3

Tony Campbell Scurry Cup, Perry Barr (Aug 2, 275m, £5,000)
Pos	Name of Greyhound	Trainer	SP	Time	Trap
1st	Laser Beam	Harry Williams	1-1f	16.06	3
2nd	Hello Superstar	Julie Ridley	7-1	16.30	6
3rd	Affleck Duke	Charlie Lister	14-1	16.34	5
4th	Positive Option	David Pruhs	7-4	16.52	1
5th	La Galga	Martin Burt	14-1	16.54	2
6th	Sanstone Rebel	Barrie Draper	20-1	16.58	4

VC Bet Grand Prix, Walthamstow (Oct 1, 640m, £10,000)
Pos	Name of Greyhound	Trainer	SP	Time	Trap
1st	Clonbrin Show	Mick Puzey	5-2f	39.55	1
2nd	Solid Money	Derek Knight	7-2	39.77	5
3rd	Dark Star Henry	Antony Ward	4-1	39.89	3
4th	Archers Sparkler	John Mullins	6-1	39.95	6
5th	Ronnies Flight	Mark Wallis	3-1	40.17	4
6th	Killeacle Fred	Ernest Gaskin Jr.	8-1	40.25	2

William Hill Grand National, Wimbledon (Oct 25, 460mH, £7,500)
Pos	Name of Greyhound	Trainer	SP	Time	Trap
1st	Lethal Rumble	Mark Wallis	9-4f	28.49	6
2nd	Limited Blue	Bernie Doyle	7-1	28.57	5
3rd	Baran Geronimo	Tom Foster	4-1	28.59	2
4th	Heavens Supreme	Tom Foster	6-1	28.69	3
5th	Cloheena Spiral	Seamus Cahill	7-1	28.73	4
6th	Stradeen Ouzo	David Mullins	3-1	28.77	1

William Hill Laurels, Belle Vue (Nov 8, 470m, £10,000)
Pos	Name of Greyhound	Trainer	SP	Time	Trap
1st	Blonde Boss	Charlie Lister	5-2	27.86	4
2nd	Ningbo Jack	Charlie Lister	6-4f	27.94	5
3rd	Paramount Bullet	Paul Liddle	16-1	28.06	3
4th	Kingsmill Again	Ann Johnson	10-1	28.18	6
5th	Zigzag Kit	Harry Williams	7-2	28.22	1
6th	Fear No One	Mark Wallis	8-1	28.24	2

William Hill St Leger, Wimbledon (Nov 15, 668m, £13,000)
Pos	Name of Greyhound	Trainer	SP	Time	Trap
1st	Greenacre Lin	Brian Clemenson	7-4jf	41.16	4
2nd	Witton Maggie	Glenn Lynas	6-1	41.46	6
3rd	Droopys Desailly	Taryn Abel	7-4jf	41.54	1
4th	Fabulous Sophie	David Firmager	6-1	41.68	5
5th	Bombersgoinghome	Stuart Cogan	16-1	41.71	3
6th	Rio Limo	Daniel Riordan	6-1	41.73	2

William Hill Oaks, Wimbledon (Dec 13, 480m, £6,000)
Pos	Name of Greyhound	Trainer	SP	Time	Trap
1st	Droopys Stacey	Ian Reilly	4-6f	29.10	1
2nd	Roxholme Girl	Hayley Keightley	8-1	29.13	4
3rd	Urban Classic	Garry Irving	20-1	29.67	2
4th	Westmead Aoifa	Nick Savva	3-1	29.86	6
5th	Pacey Macy	Paul Young	16-1	30.26	5
6th	Barefoot Jenny	Paul Hennessey	7-1	00.00	3

=== Principal Irish finals ===
Donal Reilly Easter Cup Shelbourne (Apr 9, 525y, €50,000)
Pos	Name of Greyhound	SP	Time	Trap
1st	Mineola Farloe	6-1	29.39	3
2nd	Tyrur Ted	8-11f	28.49	6
3rd	Blue Majestic	6-1	28.53	2
4th	Count Corleone	6-1	28.67	1
5th	Senahel Gift	40-1	28.95	4
6th	Droopys Corelli	11-4	28.97	5

Red Mills Produce Clonmel (May 1, 525y, €30,000)
Pos	Name of Greyhound	SP	Time	Trap
1st	Roisins Dessie	5-2	28.82	3
2nd	Shebeen Ri	6-1	28.89	1
3rd	Redbarn Panther	5-1	28.96	5
4th	Heart Rumble	3-1	28.97	4
5th	Broadacres Cash	2-1f	29.00	6
6th	Determined Minor	40-1	29.14	2

Kerry Agribusiness Irish St Leger Limerick (Jul 9, 550y, €35,000)
Pos	Name of Greyhound	SP	Time	Trap
1st	Redbarn Panther	4-1	29.72	3
2nd	He Said So	6-4f	29.86	5
3rd	Any Name Burglar	10-1	29.96	2
4th	Priceless Mail	5-1	30.14	6
5th	Deerfield Mover	9-2	30.28	4
6th	Mall Road	3-1	30.45	1

Sporting Press Oaks Shelbourne (Jul 16, 525y, €35,000)
Pos	Name of Greyhound	SP	Time	Trap
1st	Grayslands Pixie	7-4f	28.78	5
2nd	Noelles Magico	4-1	28.88	2
3rd	Miss Wonderful	4-1	29.09	6
4th	Ogillvie Teresa	8-1	29.20	1
5th	Minds Eye	20-1	29.27	3
6th	Angies Style	3-1	29.41	4

Boylesports Champion Stakes Shelbourne (Jul 30, 550y, €40,000)
Pos	Name of Greyhound	SP	Time	Trap
1st	Droopys Maldini (Fraser Black)	5-2	29.43	3
2nd	Droopys Marco (Fraser Black)	11-2	29.92	4
3rd	Disguised (Reggie Roberts)	10-1	29.97	1
4th	Yeah Man (Owen McKenna)	5-1	30.32	6
5th	Tyrur Ted (Paul Hennessy)	4-5f	30.60	5
N/R	Goldstar Premier (Owen McKenna)			2

HX Bookmakers Puppy Derby Harolds Cross (Oct 14, 525y, €35,000)
Pos	Name of Greyhound	SP	Time	Trap
1st	Greenwell Storm	6-1	28.46	3
2nd	Mossend Cait	12-1	28.60	5
3rd	Mineola Zeus	1-1f	28.77	4
4th	Shelbourne Becky	12-1	28.88	2
5th	Inny Breeze	10-1	29.09	1
6th	Droopys Sella	4-1	29.10	6

Cashmans Laurels Cork (Oct 29, 525y, €35,000)
Pos	Name of Greyhound	SP	Time	Trap
1st	Tyrur Ted	4-6f	28.63	6
2nd	Goblet Of Fire	4-1	29.08	4
3rd	Knockna Kirka	14-1	29.19	5
4th	Costly Flight	20-1	29.20	2
5th	Vancouver Sparky	5-1	29.21	1
6th	Final Show Down	20-1	29.45	3
