= 2013 English Greyhound Derby =

Greyhound racing event

- Location: Wimbledon Stadium
- Start date: 31 May
- End date: 29 June
- Total prize money: £150,000 (winner)

The 2013 William Hill Greyhound Derby took place during May and June with the final being held on 29 June 2013 at Wimbledon Stadium.

Sidaz Jack rewarded trainer Charlie Lister OBE with an incredible seventh Derby title. The ante-post favorite Ballymac Eske had finished last in the semi-finals and was eliminated. The competition was sponsored by William Hill and the winner Sidaz Jack received £150,000.

== Final result ==
At Wimbledon (over 480 metres):

Position	Name of Greyhound	Breeding	Trap	Sectional	SP	Time	Trainer
1st	Sidaz Jack	Westmead Hawk - Ballaghboy Cool	1	4.75	6-1	28.37	Charlie Lister OBE (Private)
2nd	Airlie Impact	Royal Impact - Forest Swallow	4	4.90	14-1	28.47	Paul Young (Romford)
3rd	Ballymac Vic	Kinloch Brae - Ballymac Vicky	3	4.72	9-4	28.48	Liam Dowling (Ireland)
4th	Screen Critic	Jim Joes Up - Maudabawn Joanne	6	4.77	5-1	28.60	Kevin Hutton (Swindon)
5th	Droopys Jet	Slip the Lark - Droopys Mo	2	4.74	7-4f	28.73	Fraser Black (Ireland)
6th	Bittles Bar	Droopys Scolari - Dooey Shaw	5	4.85	8-1	28.93	Martin White (Private)

=== Distances ===
1¼, short head, 1½, 1¾, 2½ (lengths)
The distances between the greyhounds are in finishing order and shown in lengths. One length is equal to 0.08 of one second.

=== Race Report ===
Ballymac Vic led to the second bend before being overtaken by Sidaz Jack and the two battled it out until Sidaz Jack gained an advantage. Airlie Impact ran on well for third place. Screen Critic and Droopys jet lost their chance after encountering trouble at the first bend and Bittles Bar made no impact.

== Quarter finals ==
Heat 1 (Jun 18)
Pos	Name	SP	Time
1st	Sidaz Jack	8-1	28.32
2nd	Hather George	12-1	28.36
3rd	Tyrur Sugar Ray	3-1	28.53
4th	Jaytee Hellcat	7-2	28.70
5th	Shaneboy Spencer	5-2f	29.35
6th	Farloe Warhawk	4-1	29.14

Heat 2 (Jun 18)
Pos	Name	SP	Time
1st	Droopys Jet	7-4	28.22
2nd	Ballymac Vic	11-8f	28.32
3rd	Screen Critic	5-2	28.43
4th	Priceless Pilot	25-1	28.52
5th	Islas Scolari	25-1	28.59
6th	Droopys Ed Moses	20-1	28.78

Heat 3 (Jun 18)
Pos	Name	SP	Time
1st	Ballymac Eske	4-6f	28.37
2nd	Holdem Spy	7-2	28.52
3rd	Teejays Bluehawk	12-1	28.70
4th	Shaneboy Alley	11-2	28.81
5th	Ringtown Snowy	10-1	28.82
6th	Frisby Barney	20-1	29.78

Heat 4 (Jun 18)
Pos	Name	SP	Time
1st	Bittles Bar	5-2	28.45
2nd	Airlie Impact	12-1	28.60
3rd	Bouncy Bocko	20-1	28.61
4th	Farloe Tango	2-1jf	28.66
5th	Carkei Max	8-1	28.69
6th	Bonamassa Rocks	2-1jf	28.71

== Semi finals ==
First Semi Final (Jun 22)
Pos	Name of Greyhound	SP	Time	Trainer
1st	Droopys Jet	11-8f	28.38	Black
2nd	Bittles Bar	7-1	28.59	White
3rd	Screen Critic	6-1	28.69	Hutton
4th	Holdem Spy	8-1	28.70	Weatherall
5th	Hather George	16-1	28.92	Lister
6th	Ballymac Eske	9-4	28.94	Draper

Second Semi Final (Jun 22)
Pos	Name of Greyhound	SP	Time	Trainer
1st	Ballymac Vic	4-5f	28.29	Dowling
2nd	Airlie Impact	12-1	28.45	Young
3rd	Sidaz Jack	3-1	28.49	Lister
4th	Tyrur Sugar Ray	5-1	28.64	Fahy
5th	Teejays Bluehawk	14-1	28.70	Young
6th	Bouncy Bocko	33-1	28.88	Dowling

== See also ==
- 2013 UK & Ireland Greyhound Racing Year
