= Greyhound of the Year Awards =

Sport award in the United Kingdom

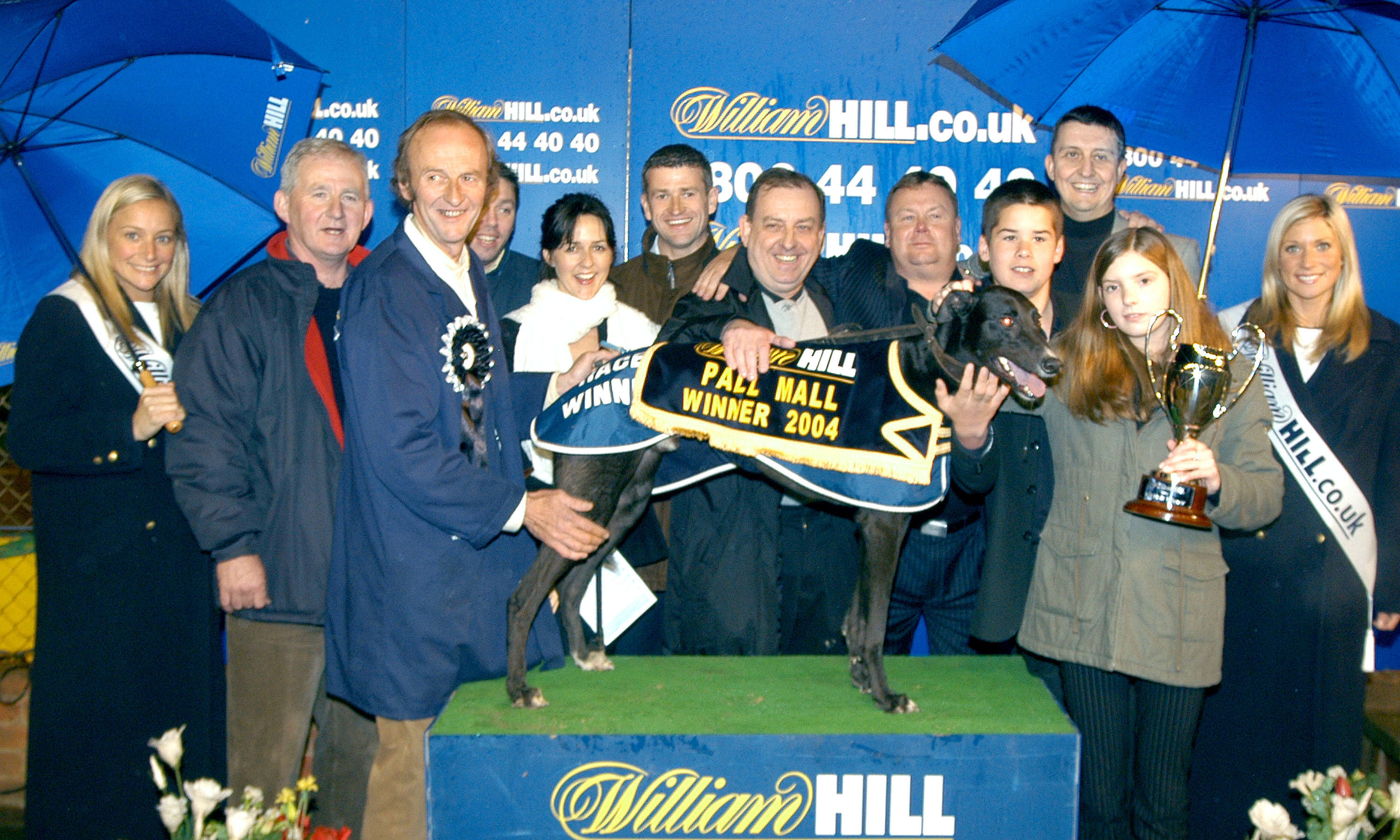
- Tims Crow (2003 Greyhound of the year)
- Start date: 1951
- Nations: England, Scotland & Wales

The Greyhound of the Year Awards are the annual awards for the leading greyhounds in the United Kingdom.

The British Greyhound Breeders & Owners Association inaugurated the Silver Greyhound Awards in 1951 and every year the winners were announced at the annual dinner and ball at the Dorchester Hotel. In 1970 the voting switched to the Greyhound Trainers & Breeders Association and the venue changed to the London Hilton on Park Lane. In 1982 the Greyhound Writers Association took over the voting and today the awards are now known as the Greyhound Board of Great Britain annual awards which are held at a different venue every year.

On 14 February 2021, the 2020 awards were held as virtual event due to the lockdown that was in place as a consequence of COVID-19.

== Past winners ==
=== Main Award ===
Year	Winner
1951	Rushton Smutty
1952	Endless Gossip
1953	Magourna Reject
1954	Pauls Fun & Pancho Villa
1955	Rushton Mac
1957	Duet Leader
1958	Pigalle Wonder
1959	Mile Bush Pride
1960	Crazy Paving & Gorey Airways
1961	Palms Printer & Clonalvy Pride
1962	Dromin Glory
1963	We'll See
1964	Lucky Hi There
1965	Clonmannon Flash
1966	Dusty Trail
1967	Carry on Oregon
1968	Yellow Printer
1969	Cals Pick
1970	Moordyke Spot
1971	Dolores Rocket
1972	Patricias Hope
1973	Case Money
1974	Westpark Mustard
1975	Pineapple Grand
1976	Mutts Silver & Westmead Champ
1977	Balliniska Band

Year	Winner
1978	Lacca Champion
1979	Desert Pilot & Kilmagoura Mist
1980	Sport Promoter
1981	Decoy Boom
1982	Lauries Panther
1983	Yankee Express
1984	Whisper Wishes
1985	Ballyregan Bob
1986	Ballyregan Bob
1987	Signal Spark
1988	Hit The Lid
1989	Waltham Abbey
1990	Westmead Harry
1991	Bobs Regan
1992	Murlens Abbey
1993	Heavenly Lady
1994	Westmead Chick
1995	Staplers Jo
1996	Spring Rose
1997	Some Picture
1998	Toms The Best
1999	Chart King
2000	Palace Issue
2001	Rapid Ranger
2002	Droopys Rhys
2003	Tims Crow

Year	Winner
2004	Fire Height Dan
2005	Westmead Hawk
2006	Westmead Hawk
2007	Spiridon Louis
2008	Lenson Joker
2009	Fear Zafonic
2010	Jimmy Lollie
2011	Taylors Sky
2012	Blonde Snapper
2013	Farloe Tango
2014	Cornamaddy Jumbo
2015	Swift Hoffman
2016	Droopys Buick
2017	King Elvis
2018	Dorotas Wildcat
2019	Ice On Fire
2020	Aayamza Royale
2021	Signet Ace
2022	Coolavanny Aunty
2023	Droopys Clue
2024	Droopys Clue
2025	Proper Heiress

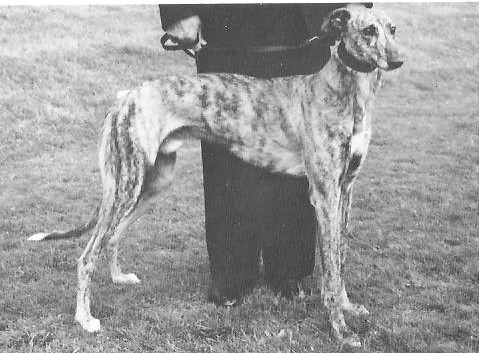
Mile Bush Pride

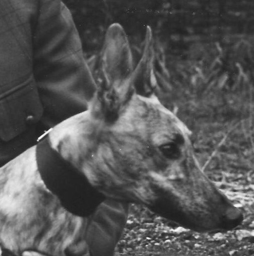
Sport Promoter

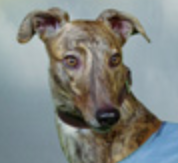
Rapid Ranger

=== Sprinter Award ===
Year	Winner
2003	Tims Crow
2004	Ningbo Jack
2005	Laser Beam
2006	Ballymac Rooster
2007	Horseshoe Ping
2008	Boherbradda Mac
2009	Jimmy Lollie
2010	Jimmy Lollie
2011	Drumcove Lad

Year	Winner
2012	Jumeirah Dubai
2013	Helenas Sailor
2014	Geelo Vegas
2015	Scolari Sound
2016	Walshes Hill
2017	Roxholme Hat
2018	Calzaghe Flash
2019	Troy Bella
2020	Shrewd Call

Year	Winner
2021	Crossfield Dusty
2022	Gougane Jet
2023	Quarteira
2024	Magical Bluebear
2025	Shadow Storm

=== Standard Award ===
Year	Winner
2003	Toms Little Jo
2004	Fire Height Dan
2005	Westmead Hawk
2006	Westmead Hawk
2007	Barnfield On Air
2008	Boherna Best
2009	Fear Zafonic
2010	Nambisco

Year	Winner
2011	Taylors Sky
2012	Blonde Snapper
2013	Sidaz Jack
2014	Newinn Yolo
2015	Swift Hoffman
2016	Droopys Buick
2017	King Elvis
2018	Dorotas Wildcat

Year	Winner
2019	Ice On Fire
2020	Kilara Lion
2021	Signet Ace
2022	Romeo Magico
2023	Links Maverick
2024	Wickey Ned
2025	Proper Heiress

=== Stayer Award ===
Year	Winner
2003	Maxie Rumble
2004	Roxholme Girl
2005	Greenacre Lin
2006	Westmead Aoifa
2007	Spiridon Louis
2008	Lenson Joker
2009	Lorrys Options
2010	Droopys Bradley

Year	Winner
2011	Blonde Fletch
2012	Blonde Reagan
2013	Farloe Tango
2014	Roxholme Dream
2015	Millwards Teddy
2016	Ferryforth Fran
2017	Rubys Rascal
2018	Bombers Bullet

Year	Winner
2019	Droopys Live
2020	Smallmead
2021	Salacres Pippy
2022	Coolavanny Aunty
2023	Droopys Clue
2024	Droopys Clue
2025	Mongys Wild

=== Marathon Award ===
Year	Winner
2003	Ericas Equity
2004	Greenacre Lin
2005	Star Of Dromin
2006	Roxholme Girl
2007	Spiridon Louis
2008	Flying Winner
2009	Midway Skipper
2010	Midway Skipper

Year	Winner
2011	Capoley Ash
2012	Blonde Reagan
2013	Musical Gaga
2014	King Kane
2015	Ballymac Bonnie
2016	Roxholme Magic
2017	Goldies Hotspur
2018	Slippy Maggie

Year	Winner
2019	Micks Little Gem
2020	Aayamza Royale
2021	Aayamza Royale
2022	Space Jet
2023	Bellmore Sally
2024	Ballymac Taylor
2025	Mongys Wild

=== Newcomer Award ===
Year	Winner
2003	Droopys Shearer
2004	Ballymac Niloc
2005	Fear Me
2006	Clash Harmonica
2007	Farloe Reason
2008	Boherna Best
2009	Eyeonthe Storm
2010	Rayvin Giovanni

Year	Winner
2011	Eden Star
2012	Ballymac Eske
2013	Jaytee Lightning
2014	Newinn Yolo
2015	Droopys Buick
2016	Bubbly Bluebird
2017	King Elvis
2018	Rising Brandy

Year	Winner
2019	Ice On Fire
2020	Tenpin
2021	Thorn Falcon
2022	Fromposttopillar
2023	Droopys Clue
2024	Wicky Ned
2025	Romeo Tomcat & Santas Amigo

=== British Bred Award ===
Year	Winner
1959	Granthamian
1960	Wheatfield Countess; Ballinasloe Blondie
1961	Ballinasloe Blondie
1962	Any Harm / Ballinasloe Blondie
1963	Tripaway
1964	Conna Count
1966	Breaches Blizzard & Cons Duke
1968	Deneholme Hunter
1969	Beaverwood Wind
1979	Gay Flash
1980	Sport Promoter
1981	Decoy Boom
1982	Special Account
1983	Yankee Express

Year	Winner
1984	House of Hope
1985	Fearless Champ
1986	Westmead Move
1987	Olivers Wish
1988	Pond Hurricane
2003	Blonde Ranger
2004	Robbie De Niro
2005	Westmead Hawk
2006	Westmead Hawk
2007	Spiridon Louis
2008	Westmead Osprey
2009	Midway Skipper
2010	Jimmy Lollie
2011	Droopys Maldini
2012	Lil Risky

Year	Winner
2013	Adgaeo Bob
2014	Salad Dodger
2015	Eden the Kid
2016	Badabing
2017	King Elvis
2018	King Turbo
2019	King Sheeran
2020	Queen Jessiej
2021	Pocket Lola
2022	Romeo Magico
2023	Romeo Command
2024	Romeo Command
2025	Romeo Steel

=== Dam Award ===
Year	Winner
2003	Grayslands Zoom
2004	Whitefort Queen
2005	Mega Delight
2006	Mega Delight
2007	Mega Delight
2008	Droopys Jean
2009	Droopys Kara
2010	Westmead Swift
2011	Mega Delight

Year	Winner
2012	Risk The Town
2013	Blonde Pearl
2014	Hawks Duchess
2015	Cabra Jade
2016	Shaws Dilemma
2017	Skate On
2018	Skate On
2019	Skate On
2020	Skate On

Year	Winner
2021	Forest Natalee
2022	Forest Natalee
2023	Queen Beyonce
2024	Queen Jessiej
2025	Fabulous Mila

=== Bitch Award ===
Year	Winner
1962	Dainty Spark
1963	Cranog Bet
1964	Cranog Bet
1966	Breaches Blizzard
1967	Miss Taft
1968	Shady Parachute
1970	Curraheen Lady
1972	Short Cake
1977	Montreen
1978	Ballinderry Moth

Year	Winner
1980	Keem Princess
1982	Duchess of Avon
1983	Sandy Lane
2011	Silverview Perky
2012	Droopys Hope
2013	Droopys Danneel
2014	Roxholme Dream
2015	Domino Storm
2016	Domino Storm
2017	Geelo Sapphire

Year	Winner
2018	Donation
2019	Bull Run Byte
2020	Queen Jessiej
2021	Jaguar Macie
2022	Coolavanny Aunty
2023	Bellmore Sally
2024	Druids Say Go
2025	New Destiny

=== Hurdles Award ===
Year	Winner
1966	Halfpenny King
2003	Farloe Browny
2004	Four Handed
2005	Druids Mickey Jo
2006	Suit Man
2007	Kildare Lark
2008	Kildare Lark
2009	Platinumlancelot
2010	Plane Daddy

Year	Winner
2011	Plane Daddy
2012	Baran Bally Hi
2013	Westmead Meteor & Mash Mad Snowy
2014	Cornamaddy Jumbo
2015	Jetstream Reason
2016	Ballymac Manix
2017	Razldazl Raidio
2018	Lenson Wilson
2019	Turnhouse Jet

Year	Winner
2020	Roxholme Biscuit
2021	Meenagh Maverick
2022	Lenson Doolin
2023	Lenson Doolin
2024	Signet Harper
Discontinued

== Gallery ==
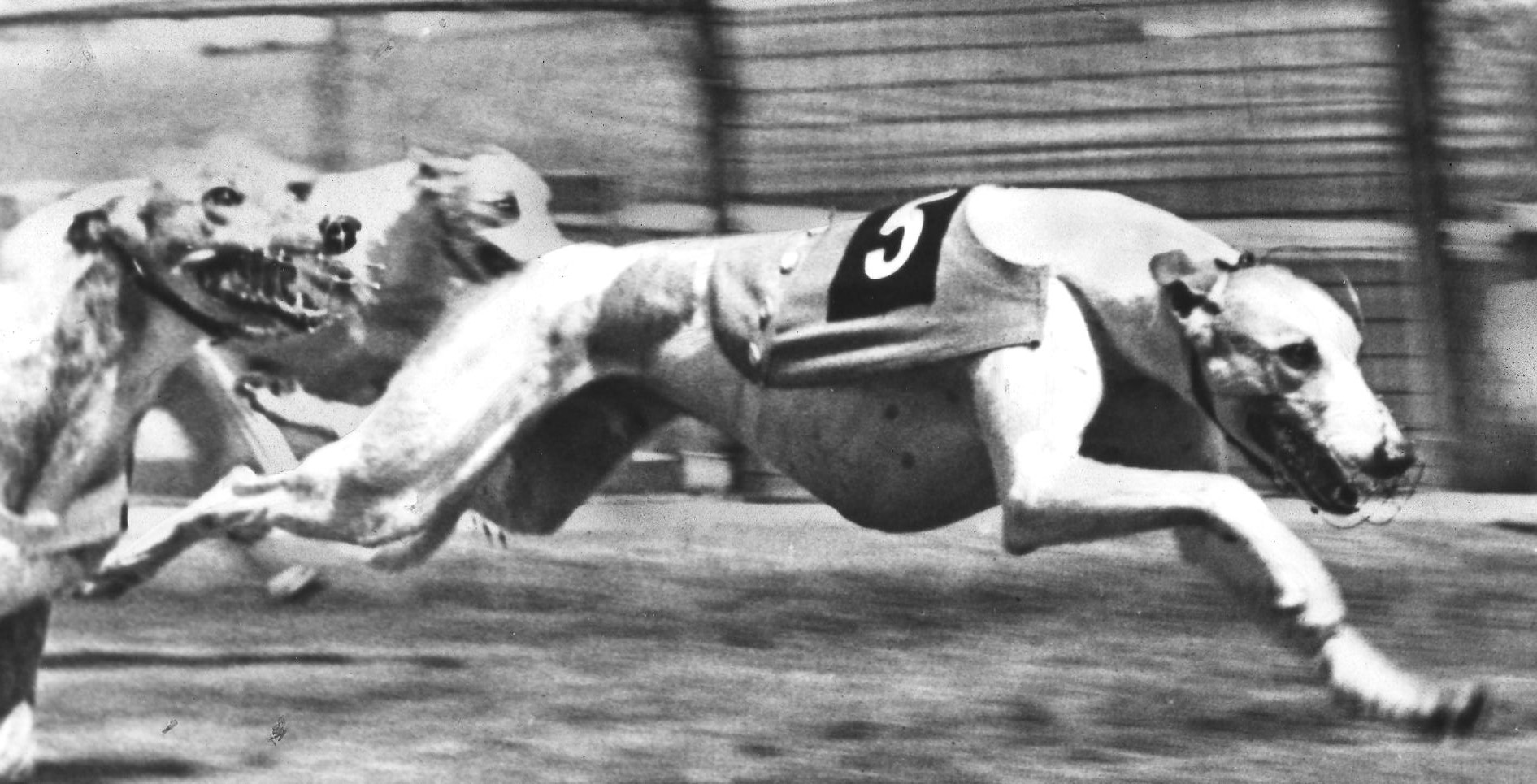
Patricias Hope

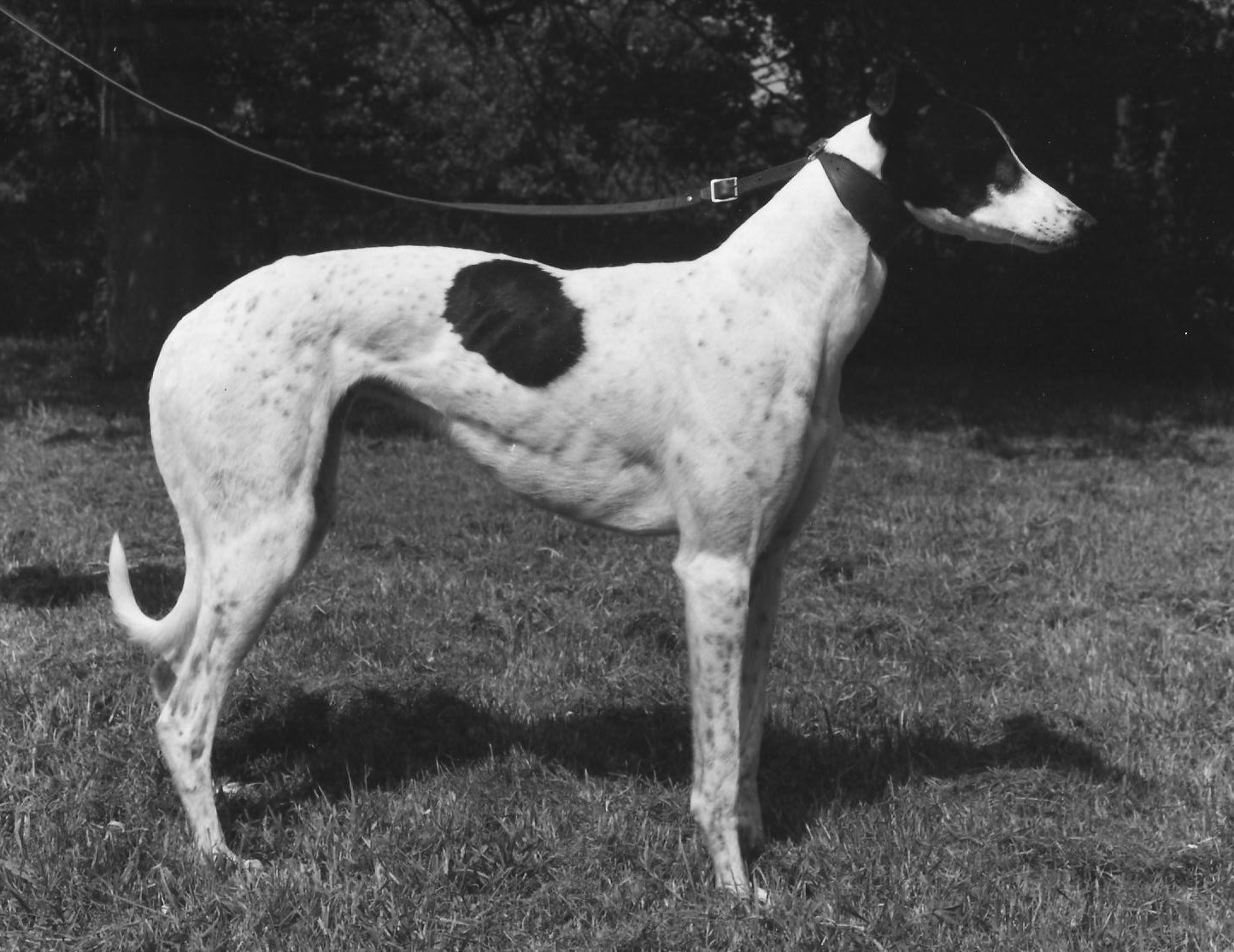
Westpark Mustard

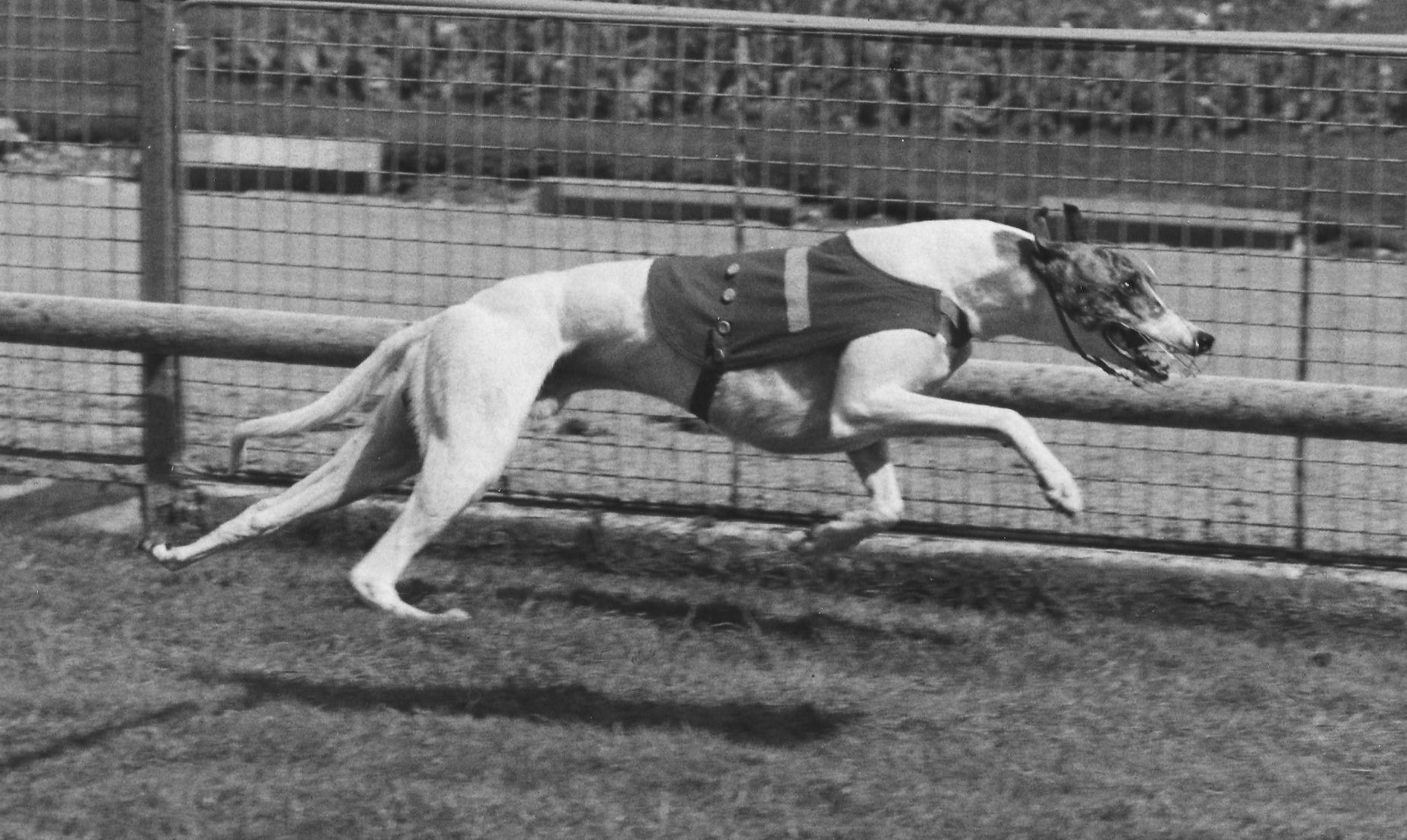
Desert Pilot

== See also ==
Irish Greyhound of the Year Awards
