= 2011 UK & Ireland Greyhound Racing Year =

2011 UK & Ireland Greyhound Racing Year was the 86th year of greyhound racing in the United Kingdom and the 85th year of greyhound racing in Ireland.

== Summary ==
Taylors Sky claimed the headlines during the year with his 2011 English Greyhound Derby triumph but Blonde Snapper also impressed by virtue of winning the William Hill Classic and Eden Star arrived on the scene with his Puppy Derby, the Romford Puppy Cup and Laurels victories. The Scottish Greyhound Derby went to Charlie Lister for the sixth time, with the greyhound Taylors Cruise, and he also won his third trainers championship.

Charlie Lister was rewarded for his services to greyhound racing when being honoured with an O.B.E in the New Year Honours. He became the first ever trainer to be recognised and ended 2011 with six English Derbies, six Scottish Derbies, 46 major competitions, four trainer of the year awards and five trainers championship wins.

=== Tracks ===
Hopes were still high that Walthamstow Stadium could be saved, Henlow Stadium owner Bob Morton pledged to keep it alive and provide 500 jobs. However, the longer it remained unused, the less likely it was that it would return to use as a greyhound track. Towards the end of the year plans were released by developer London and Quadrant to build 294 homes on the site which created an added supporter in favour of saving the stadium in the form of the newly formed residents association. The iconic entrance sign to the stadium would continue to be seen regardless of the outcome because it was giving a listed building status.

Newbridge in County Kildare suffered a closure in March but was soon purchased by Morgan & Franklin Consortium headed by Managing Director, David Morgan. Morgan had worked at a senior level with Bord na gCon in the past and was also the stadium director for Semple Stadium a hurling venue. The consortium included Peter Franklin, former head of marketing at the Bord Na gCon.

Independent stadium Ayr (Whitletts at Voluntary Park) closed after the local council had health and safety concerns.

=== Competitions ===
BAGS (Bookmakers’ Afternoon Greyhound Service) and S.I.S introduced a track championship in which Monmore won the final on home turf.

The Northern Irish Derby was introduced and carried a £25,000 prize, the richest ever held in Northern Ireland. The event was to be held at Drumbo Park. There was a dead heat in the Cesarewitch between Farloe Kraven and Westmead Palace.

=== News ===
A series of owner’s bonus series races were introduced by the Greyhound Board of Great Britain, the governing body. Hall Green trainer Mark Barlow relinquished his licence after being suspended for six months by the GBGB; the prominent trainer took the decision because he felt the suspension over one of his greyhounds vomiting on course was unjust. Long serving Romford trainer Peter Payne retired after ill health. 2010 greyhound of the year Jimmy Lollie won the Festival Flyer at Sunderland and Coral Sprint at Hove before finally being retired in October after 125 races. Chris Allsopp of Monmore was trainer of the year.

== Roll of honour ==
Major Winners
Award	Name of Winner
2011 English Greyhound Derby	Taylors Sky
2011 Irish Greyhound Derby	Razldazl George
Greyhound Trainer of the Year	Chris Allsopp
Greyhound of the Year	Taylors Sky
Irish Dog and Bitch of the Year	Razldazl George / Droopys Twirl

Betfair Trainers Championship, Wimbledon Stadium (Mar 22)
Pos	Name of Trainer	Points
1st	Charlie Lister OBE	44
2nd	Chris Allsopp	40
3rd	Mark Wallis	39
4th	Pat Rosney	33
4th	Paul Young	28
6th	Seamus Cahill	24

BAGS/SIS Track Championship, Monmore (Dec 23)
Pos	Track	Points
1st	Monmore	42
2nd	Hall Green	37
3rd	Romford	27
4th	Hove	24
5th	Belle Vue	24
6th	Newcastle	13

=== Principal UK finals ===
Ladbrokes Golden Jacket, Crayford (Feb 26, 714m, £15,000)
Pos	Name of Greyhound	Trainer	SP	Time	Trap
1st	Bush Paddy	Kelly Findlay	9-2	47.39	1
2nd	Swabys Onenut	Paul Young	2-1f	47.81	6
3rd	Lottes Girl	Kevin Hutton	5-1	48.21	4
4th	Group Skater	Paul Hennessy	4-1	48.29	5
5th	Lorrys Options	Dean Childs	4-1	48.55	3
6th	Rancey Beauty	Paul Garland	14-1	48.83	2

Bettor.com Scottish Derby, Shawfield (Apr 16, 480m, £25,000)
Pos	Name of Greyhound	Trainer	SP	Time	Trap
1st	Taylors Cruise	Charlie Lister OBE	6-4f	29.26	1
2nd	Pablo Supreme	Owen McKenna	7-2	29.38	5
3rd	Farloe Force	Owen McKenna	4-1	29.48	4
4th	Beaming Dilemma	Pat Buckley	3-1	29.64	3
5th	Bubby Razldazl	Paul Young	4-1	29.66	2
N/R	Westmead Grant	Chris Allsopp	disq+		6

+ disqualified in semi finals

Blue Square TV Trophy, Sittingbourne (May 4, 893m, £6,000)
Pos	Name of Greyhound	Trainer	SP	Time	Trap
1st	Knockies Hannah	John Mullins	7-4	57.30	1
2nd	Minnies Penske	Tony Collett	6-4f	57.35	5
3rd	Slick Sapphire	Keith Allsop	11-2	57.58	3
4th	Aero Gaga	Paul Young	12-1	57.97	4
5th	Killishin Masai	Chris Kyme	4-1	58.00	2
6th	Ministry Magpie	Lorraine Sams	N/R	lame	6

William Hill Grand Prix, Sunderland (Jul 14, 640m, £15,000)
Pos	Name of Greyhound	Trainer	SP	Time	Trap
1st	Blonde Fletch	Mark Wallis	7-4f	39.45	3
2nd	Bower Hawk	Pat Rosney	8-1	39.47	4
3rd	Nyla Fantasy	Michael Walsh	2-1	39.67	1
4th	Droopys Hester	Jimmy Wright	8-1	39.71	5
5th	Droopys Luisao	Jimmy Wright	5-2	39.72	6
6th	Melview Ace	Gordon Thompson	16-1	39.82	2

William Hill Classic, Sunderland (Jul 14, 450m, £25,000)
Pos	Name of Greyhound	Trainer	SP	Time	Trap
1st	Blonde Snapper	Mark Wallis	5-2	26.59+	4
2nd	Lampard	Jimmy Little	6-1	26.67	5
3rd	Jordansoilutions	Charlie Lister OBE	14-1	27.03	2
4th	Magna Buddy	Jimmy Wright	6-4f	27.20	3
5th	Westmead Guru	Kelly Findlay	4-1	27.44	1
6th	Skywalker Gold	Ted Soppitt	11-2	27.57	6

+ Track record

Primus Saver Grand National, Wimbledon (Aug 30, 480mH, £7,500)
Pos	Name of Greyhound	Trainer	SP	Time	Trap
1st	Victoria Falls	Richard Rees	25-1	29.80	2
2nd	Clonkeen Theo	Jason Foster	9-1	29.81	4
3rd	Swift Defender	Barry O'Sullivan	12-1	29.94	1
4th	Farloe Skywalker	Matt Dartnall	2-1jf	30.20	5
5th	Forest Rico	Derek Knight	7-2	30.24	3
6th	Blackhall Prince	Chris Kyme	2-1jf	30.56	6

East Anglian Derby, Yarmouth (Sep 15, 462m, £12,000)
Pos	Name of Greyhound	Trainer	SP	Time	Trap
1st	Ballymac Ace	Chris Allsopp	7-2	27.89	3
2nd	Taylors Cruise	Charlie Lister OBE	9-4	27.95	1
3rd	Rookery Pedro	Mark Wallis	8-1	28.13	6
4th	Yahoo Jamie	Charlie Lister OBE	5-4f	28.16	5
5th	Romeo Reason	Liz McNair	6-1	28.30	4
6th	Holycross Prince	John Mullins	12-1	28.35	2

William Hill St Leger, Wimbledon (Oct 4, 687m, £6,000)
Pos	Name of Greyhound	Trainer	SP	Time	Trap
1st	Aero Majestic	Mark Wallis	11-4	41.62	2
2nd	Capoley Ash	Barrie Draper	3-1	41.80	4
3rd	Curragh Kewell	Charles Fanous	6-1	42.02	1
4th	Blue Bee	Matt Dartnall	2-1f	42.02	3
4th	Penskey Rain	Kevin Hutton	16-1	42.12	6
6th	Darts Wizard	Philip Simmonds	8-1	42.27	5

Betfair Laurels, Belle Vue (Nov 8, 470m, £6,000)
Pos	Name of Greyhound	Trainer	SP	Time	Trap
1st	Eden Star	Barrie Draper	4-9f	27.27	3
2nd	Longwood Fantasy	Stuart Mason	12-1	27.37	4
3rd	Tudor Prince	Harry Williams	4-1	27.43	1
4th	Onceo Black	Julie Bateson	13-2	27.83	6
5th	Whitefort Mac	Kim Billingham	14-1	27.91	5
6th	Onyougojoe	George Oswald	25-1	27.99	2

William Hill Oaks, Wimbledon (Dec 8, 480m, £6,000)
Pos	Name of Greyhound	Trainer	SP	Time	Trap
1st	Silverview Perky	Charlie Lister OBE	1-1f	28.40	5
2nd	Droopys Aretha	Seamus Cahill	40-1	28.90	3
3rd	Boher Princess	Charlie Lister OBE	8-1	28.93	1
4th	Thurlesbeg Bound	Seamus Cahill	12-1	29.09	6
5th	Spinkys Nod	John Gammon	2-1	29.10	2
6th	Droopys Lona	Dean Childs	8-1	29.16	4

=== Principal Irish finals ===
College Causeway/Killahan Phanter Easter Cup, Shelbourne (Apr 16, 550y, €25,000)
Pos	Name of Greyhound	Trainer	SP	Time	Trap
1st	Makeshift	Dolores Ruth	2-1f	29.59	2
2nd	Razldazl George	Dolores Ruth	3-1	29.60	3
3rd	Slippery Bob	Larry Dunne	4-1	30.05	1
4th	Broadstrand Lad	John Linehan	4-1	30.16	5
5th	Cian Abbey	Paul Sharkey	8-1	30.30	6
6th	Hello Ringo	Paul Hennessy	40-1	30.32	4

Red Mills Produce, Clonmel (May 1, 525y, €24,500)
Pos	Name of Greyhound	Trainer	SP	Time	Trap
1st	Whiteys Hawk	Declan Byrne	7-1	28.38	2
2nd	Uncle Eoin	James Robinson	7-4f	28.48	6
3rd	St Louis Charlie	Jerry Griffin	3-1	28.66	3
4th	Bit View Micko	Philip Dillon	8-1	28.69	1
5th	Broadstrand Dan	Vincent O'Donovan	4-1	29.22	4
6th	Colourful Bolt	Mick Delahunty	5-2	29.71	5

Bettor.com Northern Irish Derby, Drumbo Park (June 25, 550y, €25,000)
Pos	Name of Greyhound	Trainer	SP	Time	Trap
1st	Loughview Gem	Francis O'Brien	5-1	29.56	3
2nd	Star Head	Brian Macklin	14-1	29.77	2
3rd	Leeview Jet	Graham Holland	1-2f	29.84	1
4th	Rafas Wee Pet	Ronnie McKeown	10-1	29.85	4
5th	Cian Abbey	Paul Sharkey	6-1	30.02	6
6th	Elwick Bolero	Jimmy Brown	6-1	30.23	56

Sporting Press Oaks, Shelbourne (Jun 25, 525y, €25,000)
Pos	Name of Greyhound	Trainer	SP	Time	Trap
1st	Droopys Twirl	John Linehan	2-1	28.42	3
2nd	Mozzletoff	Marie Gilbert	6-4f	28.43	6
3rd	Maggies Whistle	Colin Adamson	10-1	28.59	1
4th	Mutual Decision	John McGee	5-1	29.11	2
5th	Jimney Cricket	Michael Mulleady	33-1	29.23	5
6th	Cool It Baby	Trevor Cummins	4-1	31.63	4

Kerry Agribusiness Irish St Leger, Limerick (Jul 2, 550y, €25,000)
Pos	Name of Greyhound	Trainer	SP	Time	Trap
1st	What A Tornado	Paul Hennessy	7-4f	29.58	2
2nd	Varra Captain	Maura Casey	5-1	29.61	4
3rd	Shelbourne Geoff	Brian King	5-1	29.62	6
4th	Hey Gringo	Peter Cronin	10-1	29.73	1
5th	Judicial Academy	Michael O'Donovan	2-1	29.76	5
6th	Inislosky Magoo	Mary Crotty	12-1	29.80	3

Townviewfoods.com Champion Stakes, Shelbourne (Jul 23, 550y, €20,000)
Pos	Name of Greyhound	Trainer	SP	Time	Trap
1st	Uncle Eoin	James Robinson	6-1	29.81	6
2nd	Razldazl Jayfkay	Dolores Ruth	2-1jf	29.89	5
3rd	Tyrur Domingo	Conor Fahy	5-1	30.01	1
4th	Kingo	Dolores Ruth	12-1	30.07	4
5th	Broadstrand Lad	John Linehan	2-1jf	30.19	2
6th	Colorful Champ	Paul Hennessy	6-1	30.31	3

HX Bookmakers Puppy Derby, Harolds Cross (Oct 7, 525y, €25,000)
Pos	Name of Greyhound	Trainer	SP	Time	Trap
1st	Sparta Maestro	Philip Gough	5-4f	28.59	5
2nd	Callums Flash	John Kiely	6-1	28.67	6
3rd	Ruthless Man	John McGee	11-1	28.99	4
4th	Swift Marathon	Seamus Graham	6-4	29.02	2
5th	Incitatus	Pat Buckley	16-1	29.34	3
6th	Movealong Dash	William Barry	5-1	29.78	1

Pat Hennerty Sales Laurels, Cork (Oct 22, 525y, €30,000)
Pos	Name of Greyhound	Trainer	SP	Time	Trap
1st	Razldazl Rioga	Dolores Ruth	7-2	28.32	6
2nd	Beaming Dilemma	Pat Buckley	6-1	28.67	2
3rd	Varra Captain	Owen McKenna	13-1	28.84	4
4th	Deerfield Music	Maurice O'Connor	6-4f	28.95	1
5th	Leeview Jet	Graham Holland	2-1	29.05	3
N/R	St Louis Charlie	Jerry Griffin	lame		5
