= Nick Savva =

British greyhound trainer and breeder (1934–2026)

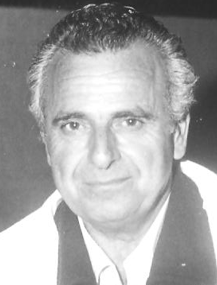
- Savva circa 1990

Personal information
- Born: 1934 British Cyprus
- Died: 2 April 2026 (aged 91)
- Occupation: Greyhound trainer

Sport
- Sport: Greyhound racing

Achievements and titles
- National finals: Derby wins: English Derby (1998, 2005, 2006, 2007); Irish Derby (1997); Scottish Derby (1982, 1990, 1998, 2001); Classic/Feature wins: St Leger (1978, 1997, 1999); Laurels (1987, 1992); Cesarewitch (1972, 1996, 1997); Gold Collar (1977, 1986, 1992); Grand Prix (1986, 1987, 1992); Oaks (1994, 1996, 1998, 2006); TV Trophy (1974, 1978); Trainers Championship (1977, 1983, 2000, 2012)

Nicolas Savva (1934 – 2 April 2026) was a Cypriot-born British greyhound trainer and breeder. He was a four times winner of the English Greyhound Derby and was regarded as Britain's most successful breeder, along with his wife Natalie Savva (1935–2019) who also held the kennels training licence at one time.

== Early life ==
Savva was born in British Cyprus in 1934, and left the island country for London where he gained work in an engineering factory and then a restaurant. He started attending race meetings at Harringay Stadium in 1952 and started a dressmaking business. He met Natalie Drew in 1957 and they married in 1961 before selling his dressmaking business and buying kennels.

== Career ==
Nick and Natalie started training and breeding greyhounds and became increasingly successful. Many of the greyhounds bred at their Westmead Kennels base were given a name with the Westmead prefix and in 1972 the kennel gained their first major success with Westmead Lane after winning the Cesarewitch. Natalie held the trainer's licence at this stage and actually won the inaugural Trainers Championship (jointly with Geoff De Mulder) in 1977.

Westmead Myra reached the 1976 English Greyhound Derby final and based near Dunstable in Bedfordshire the kennel would have spells at seven tracks; Wembley, Cambridge, Coventry, Milton Keynes, Hackney, Henlow and Walthamstow but would race mainly unattached.

During the next decade the Westmead name became the leading prefix with the likes of Westmead Power and Westmead Move, in addition Special Account won the Scottish Greyhound Derby. The remainder of 1980s and early 1990s saw major wins for Olivers Wish, Flashy Sir, Westmead Harry, Westmead Surprise and many more.

The quality of breeding increased even further with the likes of Phantom Flash, Staplers Jo, Toms The Best and Tralee Crazy. During 1997, Toms The Best claimed the Irish Greyhound Derby and one year later the English Greyhound Derby, Tralee Crazy won a Classic double and Larkhill Jo won the Scottish Greyhound Derby.

Sonic Flight won the 2001 Scottish Derby before the Savvas established themselves as the industry leaders in breeding and training during an extraordinary spell. The spell came after he gained a new licence in 2004 following a two-year break and saw Westmead Hawk secure two consecutive English Derby wins in 2005 and 2006 and Westmead Lord set a record by completing a third successive Derby win for the kennel in 2007.

== Death ==
Savva died on 2 April 2026, at the age of 91.

== Awards ==
The Savvas are four times winners of the Trainers Championship in 1977, 1983, 2000 and 2012.
