= Westmead Hawk =

Male greyhound, winner of the English Greyhound derby

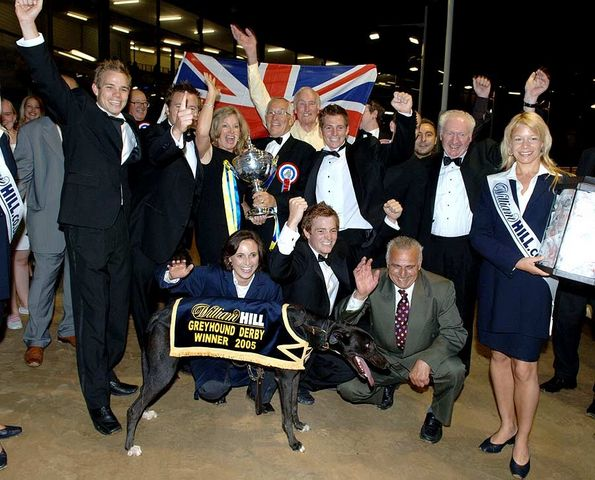
- Sire: Sonic Flight
- Dam: Mega Delight
- Sex: Dog
- Whelped: 1 May 2003
- Died: 26 May 2014 (aged 11)
- Color: Black
- Breeder: Nick Savva
- Owner: Bob Morton
- Trainer: Nick Savva

Record
- 2 x English Greyhound Derby (2005, 2006)

Honours
- 2005 & 2006 Greyhound of the Year

Westmead Hawk (May 2003 – 26 May 2014) was a black male greyhound. He was a two-time winner of the English Greyhound Derby in 2005 and 2006, and has drawn comparisons with Mick the Miller and horse Red Rum. Westmead Hawk was the father to two English Greyhound Derby winners – Taylors Sky 2011 and Sidaz Jack 2013.

== Racing career ==
Hawk was entered in the 2005 English Greyhound Derby. In the final, Hawk started in the fourth trap as the favourite at 5-4 and was lagging behind the leaders after the first bend. A late burst of speed saw him overtake the leader Blonde Mac on the final turn and win the race in 28.56 seconds by a length and three-quarters. This win earned his owners the prize money of £100,000. After his victory, his owners announced that his next target would be the Irish Greyhound Derby.

He went undefeated through the five qualifying rounds of the 2006 English Greyhound Derby and entered the final as the 4-7 favourite. Mineola Farloe set the pace during the race with Hawk hanging back behind him. Hawk closed over the final two bends, and won by three-quarters of a length becoming only the fourth dog to have won the English Greyhound Derby twice. This victory won a further £100,000 prize for his owners. In the run up to the Derby he was drawing comparisons with famous racing Greyhound Mick the Miller. Chairman of the British Greyhound Racing Board, Lord David Lipsey, said "We launched a five-year plan for the rejuvenation of the sport this year but Westmead Hawk is doing more to encourage people to come racing than anything us humans could do! He is a canine Red Rum."

Lipsey wanted Westmead Hawk to win the Derby for a third time. However, the dog broke his hock while racing at Hall Green less than a month after the second Derby win and looked to have been retired to stud due to the severity of the injury. At the time Lord Lipsey said, "It is truly awful news. The Hawk really put greyhound racing back on the map – and anyone who saw him race at Wimbledon will never forget being there."

== Retirement and later life ==
Westmead Hawk also had a few famous offspring. Hawk sired Taylors Sky from the dam Rising Angel. Sky went on to win the English Greyhound Derby in 2011. He also sired Sidaz Jack, the winner of the English Greyhound Derby in 2013 from the dam Ballaghboy Cool.

Westmead Hawk died at the Dunstable base of his trainer Nick Savva on 26 May 2014.

== Pedigree ==
Eaglehawk Star
Frightful Flash
Leggy Waitress
Sonic Flight
Flashy Sir
Westmead Delight
Westmead King
Westmead Hawk
Ginger
Smooth Rumble
Follow Through
Mega Delight
Mustang Jack
Knockeevan Joy
Rubys Bridge
