= Golden Jacket =

Former greyhound racing competition

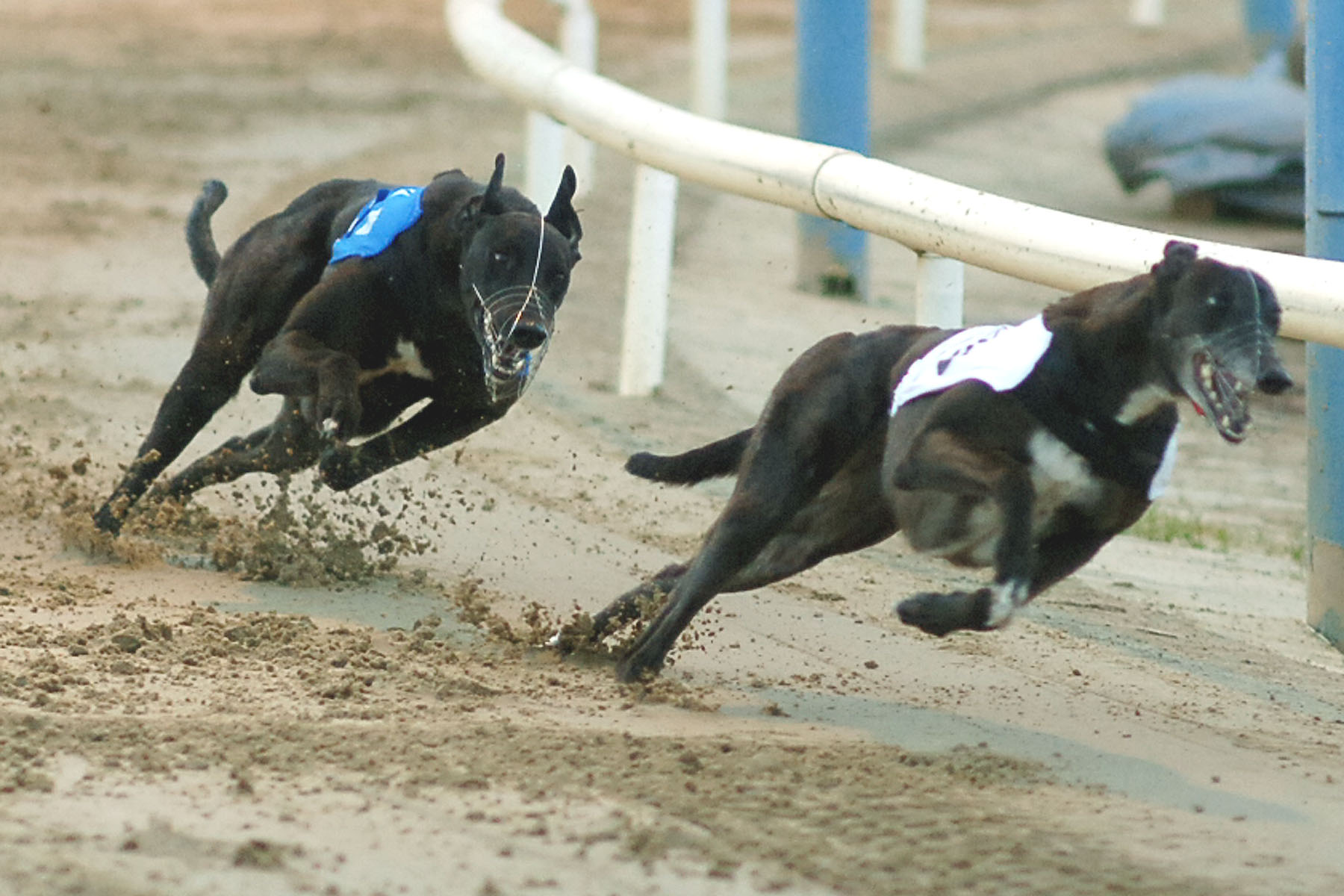
- 2006 champion Greenacre Lin (white jacket)
- Class: Category 1
- Location: Monmore Green Stadium
- Inaugurated: 1975

Race information
- Surface: Sand
- Purse: £20,000 (winner)

The Golden Jacket is a greyhound racing competition. It was inaugurated in 1975 at Harringay Stadium but following the closure of the track switched to Hall Green Stadium and then Monmore Green Stadium before finding a home at Crayford Stadium from 1987 until 2024. With the closure of Crayford in 2024, the event was not held in 2025 before it was reinstated at Monmore Green Stadium in 2026.

== Venues and distances ==
- 1975–1984 (Harringay, 660m)
- 1985–1985 (Hall Green, 663m)
- 1986–1986 (Monmore, 647m)
- 1987–2024 (Crayford, 714m)
- 2026–2026 (Monmore, 684m)

== Sponsors ==
- 1987–2021 (Ladbrokes)
- 2022–2024 (Premier Greyhound Racing)
- 2026–2026 (Ladbrokes)

== Winners ==
Year	Winner	Breeding	Trainer	Time (sec)	SP	Notes/ref
1975	Nice One Cyril	Newdown Heather - Itsabet	Charlie Coyle (Private)	40.86	11/4jf	
1976	Glin Bridge	Spectre - Shore Sussie	George Curtis (Brighton)	40.59	9/4	
1977	Sindys Flame	Monalee Champion - Dolores Rocket	John Honeysett (Private)	40.99	11/10f	
1978	Black Legend	Spectre - Nora Again	Ted Dickson (Slough)	41.09	7/4f	
1979	Westmead Bound	Westmead County - Affoulia Girl	Natalie Savva (Wembley)	41.02	2/1	
1980	Brainy Prince	Mortor Light - Move First	Rita Hayward (Coventry)	40.63	2/1jf	
1981	Just It	Itsachampion - Salubrious Lady	Terry Duggan (Romford)	40.67	7/2	
1982	Try Travelscene	Ballybeg Prim - My Dowry	Alan Mobley (Private)	40.61	7/2	
1983	Minnies Matador	Sand Man - Virginia Chat	Paddy Milligan (Private)	40.69	4/1	
1984	Amazing Man	Glen Rock - Orchard Robin	Derek Knight (Brighton)	40.88	5/2	
1985	Keem Rocket	Decoy Sovereign - Keem Princess	Tony Meek (Swindon)	41.67	8/11f	
1986	Glenowen Queen	Yellow Ese - Rikasso Monica	Dick Hawkes (Walthamstow)	40.92	5/2	
1987	Clover Park	Westpark Clover - Mullinakill	John Gibbons (Crayford)	35.40	10/1	
1988	Decoy Princess	Glatton Grange - Decoy Lassie	Mrs D T Lucas (Swaffham)	46.30	7/2	
1989	Time Lord	Manorville Sand - Scintillas Tina	Hazel Dickson (Wembley)	46.03	10/1	
1990	Chicita Banana	Sail On II - Bonita Banana	John McGee Sr. (Hackney)	45.75	9/4	
1991	Bobs Regan	Ballyregan Bob - Sandy Gem	Brian Timcke (Private)	47.00	6/1	
1992	Bobs Regan	Ballyregan Bob - Sandy Gem	Brian Timcke (Private)	46.10	5/1	
1993	Heavenly Lady	Manorville Sand - Black Sancisco	Linda Mullins (Walthamstow)	45.33	2/5f	
1994	Wexford Minx	Manorville Major - Ballarue Suzy	Derek Knight (Hove)	45.83	11/4jf	
1995	Wexford Minx	Manorville Major - Ballarue Suzy	Derek Knight (Hove)	45.67	13/8f	
1996	Coolmona Road	Ardfert Sean - Westpark Tee Off	Derek Knight (Hove)	45.75	5/4f	
1997	Broadacres Lad	Murlens Slippy - Game Misty	Terry Dartnall (Wimbledon)	46.08	7/1	
1998	El Onda	Droopys Sandy - Lady Cutie	Linda Mullins (Walthamstow)	46.36	22/1	
1999	Gottabegood	Phantom Flash - Oh So Nice	Paul Garland (Sittingbourne)	46.09	11/2	
2000	Knappogue Oak	Frightful Flash - Dartfield Lass	Ken Bebbington (Monmore)	45.77	3/1	
2001	Blues Best Tayla	Top Honcho - Micks Best Girl	Paul Young (Romford)	45.19	7/4	Track record
2002	Sundar Storm	Toms The Best - Westmead Lynx	Kim Marlow (Romford)	47.07	14/1	
2003	Centour Corker	Smooth Rumble - Sylvies Rantogue	Brian Clemenson (Hove)	44.74	11/8f	Track record
2004	Midway Tomsscout	Toms The Best - Midway Tina	Henry Chalkley (Peterborough)	44.72	12/1	
2005	Milldean Clarky	Frisby Flashing - Creamery Profit	Barry O'Sullivan (Crayford)	45.98	7/1	
2006	Greenacre Lin	Top Honcho - First to Return	Brian Clemenson (Hove)	45.53	4/1	
2007	Walk the Line	Droopys Vieri - Ballycahane Zoie	Patsy Cusack (Crayford)	46.00	8/1	
2008	Shelbourne Merc	Just the Best - Queen Survivor	Brian Clemenson (Hove)	45.61	3/1	
2009	Lorrys Options	Westmead Hawk - Droopys Seville	Dean Childs (Private)	45.92	2/1f	
2010	Group Skater	Top Honcho - Group Special	Paul Hennessey (Ireland)	44.79	2/1	
2011	Bush Paddy	Westmead Hawk - Droopys Rena	Kelly Findlay (Private)	47.39	9/2	
2012	Blue Bee	Hondo Black – Blue Honey	Matt Dartnall (Swindon)	45.95	7/2	
2013	White Soks Roks	Royal Impact – Lemon Rita	Daniel Riordan (Henlow)	45.48	4/5f	
2014	Hometown Honey	Hometown Boy Nga – Swift Blitz	Mark Wallis (Yarmouth)	45.45	4/6f	
2015	Wiki Waki Woo	Premier Fantasy – Final Oyster	Angie Kibble (Hall Green)	44.99	6/1	
2016	Patchys Kerry	Blackstone Gene – Droopys Stosur	Mark Wallis (Towcester)	44.94	2/5f	
2017	Boylesports Star	Razldazl Billy - Razldazl Marilyn	Dolores Ruth (Ireland)	45.18	2/1jf	
2018	Shotgun Bullet	Kinloch Brae - Winning Impact	Derek Knight (Hove)	44.95	5/4f	
2019	Stardom	Ballymac Eske - Old Refrain	Heather Dimmock (Henlow)	45.27	6/4f	
2020	Skilful Sandie	Kinloch Brae - Global Liberty	Patrick Janssens (Central Park)	44.87	7/2	
2021	Punk Rock Mutley	Farloe Blitz – Highview Dreamer	Stuart Maplesden (Hove)	45.78	33/1	Biggest SP winner in history of event
2022	Bellmore Sally	Droopy Sydney – Bellmore Lucy	James Fenwick (Newcastle)	44.81	5/4f	
2023	Bellmore Sally	Droopy Sydney – Bellmore Lucy	James Fenwick (Newcastle)	44.77	9/4jf	
2024	Dazl Rolex	Superior Panama – Razldazl Mya	Ricky Holloway (Crayford)	45.03	5/1	
2026	Mongys Wild	Roxholme Olaf – Banter Breeze	Mark Wallis (Private)	40.54	4/7f	
