= English Puppy Derby =

British greyhound racing competition

Puppy Derby
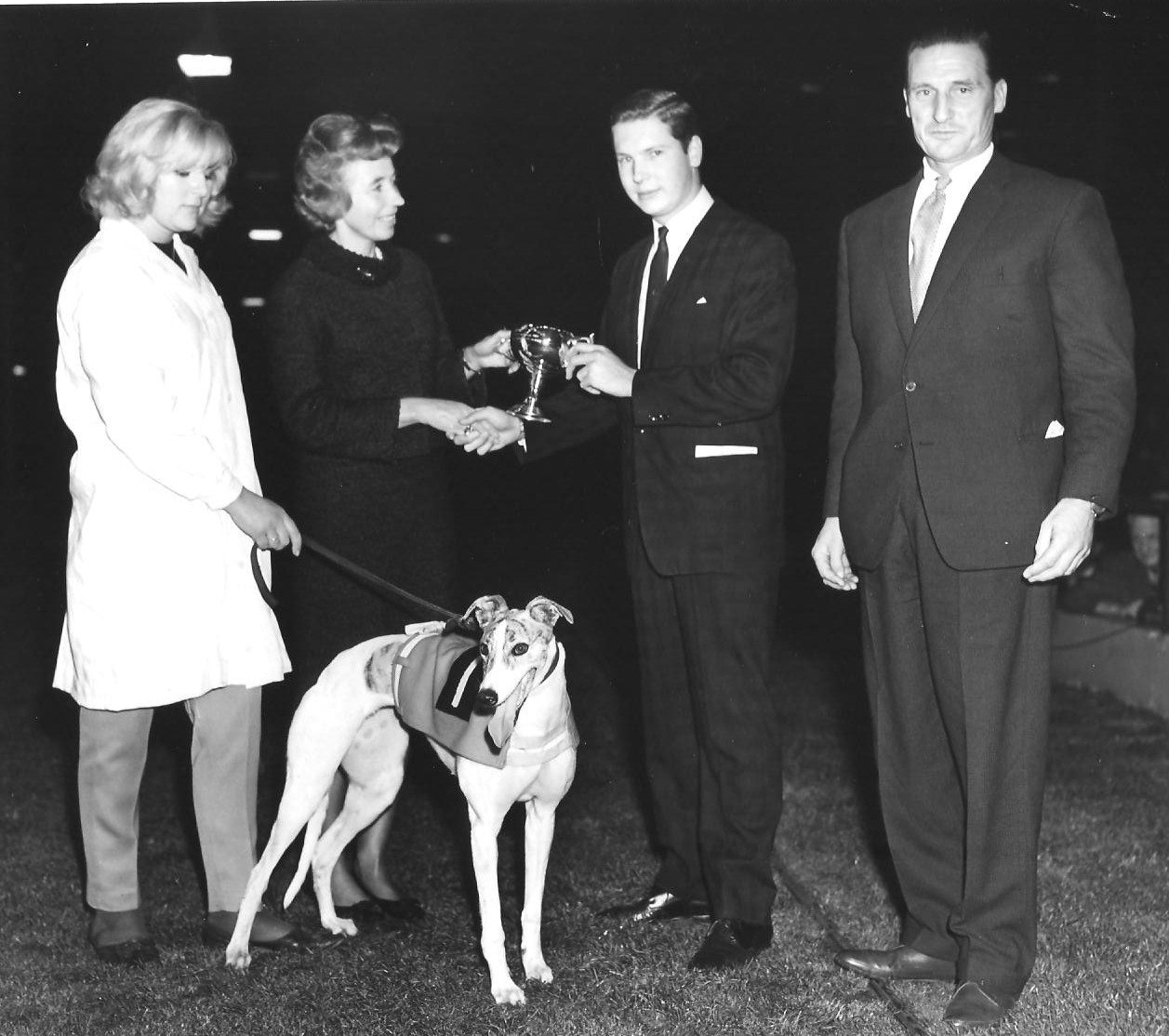
- Puppy Derby 1962
- Class: Category 1
- Location: Towcester Greyhound Stadium
- Inaugurated: 1929

Race information
- Distance: 500 metres
- Surface: Sand
- Qualification: Puppies only (15-24 months old)
- Purse: £10,000

The Puppy Derby is a British greyhound racing competition held at Towcester Greyhound Stadium.

== History ==
The event was held at Wimbledon Stadium from 1929 to 2016, until the closure of the stadium in 2017.

Other Puppy Derby races have been created by other race tracks including the Midland Puppy Derby and despite some of these races matching or surpassing the original Puppy Derby for prize money at certain times they do not carry the same prestige.

In 2017 the race switched from Wimbledon and the GRA to Towcester and the prize money increased to £20,000 to the winner, bringing the race back to its former glory When it switched to Towcester in 2017 it was only held for one year because the track closed and the event was switched to Henlow. It then reverted to sister track Towcester in 2020, when it re-opened under promoter Kevin Boothby. The 2022 edition was not held due to problems with the weather and rescheduling.

== Venue and distances ==
- 1929–1974 (Wimbledon, 500 yards)
- 1975–2009 (Wimbledon, 460 metres)
- 2010–2016 (Wimbledon, 480 metres)
- 2017–2017 (Towcester, 480 metres)
- 2018–2019 (Henlow, 460 metres)
- 2020–2025 (Towcester, 500 metres)

== Sponsors ==
- 1989–1989 (Truman's Brewery)
- 1990–1990 (Foster's Lager)
- 1991–1991 (Wey Plastics)
- 1994–1994 (Surrey Racing)
- 2001–2006 (William Hill)
- 2007–2007 (Holsten Pils)
- 2008–2009 (Stan James)
- 2010–2012 (William Hill)
- 2013–2016 (RFS)
- 2017–2017 (ECC Timber)
- 2018–2018 (Gain Nutrition)
- 2020–2020 (Star Sports)
- 2021–2023 (Racing Post GTV)

== Past winners ==
Year	Winner	Breeding	Trainer	Time (sec)	SP	Notes/ref
1929	So Green	Running Rein - Salsette	Jim Syder Sr. (Wembley)	30.73	4/6f	
1930	Mountain Loafer	Loafer - Mountain Gift	Paddy McEllistrim (Wimbledon)	30.00	4/6f	
1931	Lavaka	Loafer - Rosina	Jerry Hannafin (Wimbledon)	30.00	2/1	
1932	Mikado Beauty	Hertford - Little Fawn Biddy	Jim Syder Sr. (Wembley)	29.81	4/9f	
1933	Denham Robin	Deemster - Beauvallon	Mrs E.G.Westley (Private)	29.31	4/5f	
1934	Tosto	Border Line - Ranting Rhyme	Sidney Orton (Wimbledon)	28.87	5/2	dead-heat
1934	Maidens Delight	Maiden's Boy - Springfield Sal	Miss Young (Private)	28.87	11/10f	dead-heat
1935	Flying Joule	Silver Seal - Hidden Pride	Marjorie Yate (Private)	29.26	1/1f	
1936	Berwick Law	Future Cutlet - Lily Bell	Les Parry (Powderhall)	29.63	100/8	
1937	Junior Classic	Beef Cutlet - Lady Eleanor	Joe Harmon (Wimbledon)	28.86	4/6f	
1938	Grosvenor Ferdinand	Golden Hammer - Wonderful Expression	F.S.Rolfe (Private)	29.04	10/1	
1939	Keel Border	Creamery Border - Keel Ruby	Joe Harmon (Wimbledon)	29.08	11/8f	
1940	Grosvenor Flexion	Wily Captain - Cook Street	Joe Harmon (Wimbledon)	29.45	5/4f	
1941	Laughing Lieutenant	Beef Cutlet - Maid Of Tenby	Bert Heyes (White City)	29.41	1/1f	
1942	Clows Top	J.H. - Chanceful	Sid Jennings (Wembley)	28.99	6/1	
1943	Allardstown Playboy	Strong Mutton - Lazy Girl	Stanley Biss (Private)	29.32	9/4	
1944	Prancing Kitty	Tanist - Be Careful Kitty	Bill Weaver (Catford)	29.20	2/1	
1945	Lee Ripple	Tiro - Dame Of The House	Stanley Biss (Clapton)	28.81	11/4	
1946	Castletown Tiptoes	Castledown Lad - Hotcap	Sidney Orton (Wimbledon)	29.20	2/1f	
1947	Mad Birthday	Mad Tanist - Bella's Bloom	Stanley Biss (Clapton)	28.56	2/5f	
1948	Saft Alex	Mad Tanist - Fair Light	Jack Toseland (Perry Barr)	28.72	11/10	
1949	Ballycurreen Garrett	Ballycurreen Duke - Ballymakeera Keeper	Jack Harvey (Wembley)	29.21	6/1	
1950	Rushton Smutty	Mad Tanist - Summer Frock	Jack Harvey (Wembley)	28.96	4/7f	
1951	Moreton Ann	Grand Hussar - Moreton Lily	Jack Harvey (Wembley)	28.59	6/1	
1952	Lizette	Master Captain - Dorothy Ann	Paddy Fortune (Wimbledon)	28.75	7/1	
1953	Lancelot	Rough Billie - Gay Serenade	Paddy Fortune (Wimbledon)	28.96	1/2f	
1954	Gulf of Darien	Imperial Dancer - Dorothy Ann	Jack Harvey (Wembley)	28.31	5/4f	
1955	Glacier Metal	Ballymac Ball - Cloudy Midnight	Paddy Fortune (Wimbledon)	28.74	10/1	
1956	Ford Spartan	Polonius - Harrow Glamour	Dennis Hannafin (Wimbledon)	28.02	2/1f	
1957	Sean's Pal	The Grand Champion - Grangeclare Lady	Tom'Paddy'Reilly (Walthamstow)	28.2	13/2	
1958	Varra Black Nose	Glittering Look - Typhoon Jane	Dennis Hannafin (Wimbledon)	28.08	8/13f	
1959	Violet's Duke	Champion Prince - Autumn Violet	Barney O'Connor (Walthamstow)	28.04	3/1	
1960	Oregon Prince	Knock Hill Chieftain - Burleigh's Fancy	Phil Rees Sr. (Private)	28.59	6/5f	
1961	Dancing Point	Sword Dance - Irish Sunshine	Clare Orton (Wimbledon)	28.35	1/1f	
1962	Cloudbank	Knock Hill Chieftain - Direct Lead	Dave Geggus (Walthamstow)	27.96	2/5f	
1963	Pineapple Joe	Clopook - Sight Unseen	Dennis Hannafin (Wimbledon)	27.95	1/1f	
1964	Bad Trick	Tuturama - Nifty Lady	George Curtis (Portsmouth)	28.46	2/1f	
1965	Morden Mist	Super Orange - Denver Hetty	Clare Orton (Wimbledon)	28.27	11/4f	
1966	Wattlehurst Rogue	Wattlehurst Rocket - Charity Ball	Jimmy Jowett (Clapton)	28.58	5/2	
1967	Breach's Bill	Jerpoint Prince - Breach's Rainbow	Judy Pattinson (Private)	28.10	5/4f	
1968	Winter Hope	Newdown Heather - Final Score	Des Dare (Private)	28.53	4/7f	
1969	Sherwood Glen	Maryville Hi - Bresheen Umm	Joe Booth (Private)	28.27	100/30	
1970	Crefogue Flash	Newdown Heather - Duffry Flash	Stan Mitchell (Belle Vue)	27.99	5/2	
1971	Tawny Satin	The Grand Silver - Cathy's Tiny	Tom Johnston Jr. (Wembley)	28.22	9/2	
1972	Seaman's Pride	Own Pride - Stolen Tilley	Paddy Milligan (Private)	27.78	5/2f	
1973	Handy High	Handy Valley - Black Highbird	Paddy Milligan (Private)	28.17	4/5f	
1974	Tory Mor	Tom's Pal - Melville Honey	Paddy Milligan (Private)	28.40	3/1	
1975	Knockrour Bank	Clomoney Jet - Damsels Lass	John Coleman (Wembley)	27.72	11/10f	
1976	Cahurmore Speech	Free Speech - Pat's Glory	Len White (Private)	28.17	1/2f	
1977	Ruakura's Mutt	Spectre - Areopagus	Charlie Coyle (Private)	27.65	9/4	
1978	Purdy's Pursuit	Aghawadda Flash - Exchange Dolly	Phil Rees Jr. (Wimbledon)	27.83	20/1	
1979	Price Wise	Free Speech - Take The Lead	Frank Baldwin (Perry Barr)	27.70	12/1	
1980	Desmond's Fancy	Sole Aim - Blissful Linda	Jack Coker (Oxford)	28.22	7/1	
1981	Special Account	Westmead County - Ka Boom	Natalie Savva (Cambridge)	27.79	7/2	
1982	Mountleader Mint	Cairnville Jet - Mountleader Cleo	Terry Duggan (Romford)	27.82	2/1f	
1983	Rhincrew Moth	Ballarat Prince - Skipping Fun	Dolly Gwynne (Ipswich)	27.53	1/3f	
1984	Ben's Champion	Lacca Champion - Raffles Bridge	Eric Pateman (Wimbledon)	27.61	4/6f	
1985	Fearless Swift	Ron Hardy - Sarahs Bunny	Geoff De Mulder (Oxford)	27.67	4/5f	
1986	Spiral Darkie	Lindas Champion - Spiral Three	Gary Baggs (Ramsgate)	27.70	9/2	
1987	Debby Hero	Debbycot Lad - Kisco	David Kinchett (Wimbledon)	27.99	12/1	
1988	Spring Band	Wise Band - Gentle Heartrob	Sam Sykes (Wimbledon)	28.13	3/1	
1989	Newry Flash	Oran Flash - Townview Fuzz	Arthur Hitch (Wimbledon)	27.97	4/1	
1990	Murlens Support	Moral Support - Murlens Chill	Tony Meek (Oxford)	28.50	1/2f	
1991	Right Move	Daleys Gold - Westmead Move	Nick Savva (Milton Keynes)	28.25	14/1	
1992	Bixby	Murlens Slippy - Skylab	Bill Black (Reading)	28.04	7/2	
1993	Lughill Slippy	I'm Slippy - Lady Serina	Tony Meek (Oxford)	27.99	11/4	
1994	Bonmahon Darkie	Carmels Prince - Debs Tick	Terry Dartnall (Wimbledon)	27.70	2/1f	
1995	Corpo Election	Tapwatcher - No Thanks	Wayne Wilson (Sittingbourne)	27.56	1/4f	
1996	Black Gem Charm	Slaneyside Hare - Perrys Charmer	Philip Rees Jr. (Wimbledon)	27.74	7/1	
1997	Lenson Hero	Right Move - New Branch	Norah McEllistrim (Wimbledon)	27.97	5/1	
1998	Sarah Dee	Arrigle Buddy - Castlegannon Pop	Nick Savva (Milton Keynes)	27.73	11/8f	
1999	Micks Lotto	Mountleader Peer - Tracys Lady	Patsy Byrne (Wimbledon)	27.49	2/7f	
2000	Navigation Lad	Lassa Java - Suirside Lass	Pat McComish (Private)	27.69	6/4jf	
2001	Bringinthemoney	Powerful Flash - Locgaram Kit	Pat Thompson (Crayford)	28.00	25/1	
2002	On Line Deal	Staplers Jo - Lady Ballydaniel	Paul Young (Romford)	27.96	5/1	
2003	Kinda Spooky	Top Honcho - Kinda Swell	Linda Jones (Walthamstow)	27.51	8/1	
2004	Olybean	Kiowa Shawnee So - Jabilish	Ernie Gaskin Sr. (Walthamstow)	27.47	11/10f	
2005	Droopys Lomasi	Knockeevan Major - Droopys Beauty	Steve Dimmock (Milton Keynes)	27.79	12/1	
2006	Droopys Tops	Blackjack Tom - Macy Gray	Chris Lund (Doncaster)	27.57	3/1	
2007	Opening Artist	Droopys Scolari - Droopys Darlene	Bernie Doyle (Wimbledon)	27.80	9/2	
2008	Jesters Nap	Droopys Vieri - Star Time	Jim Daly (Yarmouth)	27.55	11/10f	
2009	Westmead Logan	Droopys Vieri – Westmead Swift	Nick Savva (Private)	27.33	5/1	
2010	Rayvin Giovanni	Blackstone Gene – Droopys Sporty	Seamus Cahill (Hove)	28.36	11/8f	
2011	Eden Star	Top Savings – Aranock Val	Barrie Draper (Sheffield)	28.51	8/13f	
2012	Farloe Warhawk	Ace Hi Rumble - Wontbelong	Barrie Draper (Sheffield)	28.32	1/1f	
2013	Bubbly Beauty	College Causeway – Lees Legend	Paul Young (Romford)	28.64	7/1	
2014	Lenson Sanchez	Tullymurry Act – Beaming Olive	Pat Buckley (Ireland)	28.59	5/4f	
2015	Droopys Roddick	Droopys Jet – Droopys Start	Pat Buckley (Ireland)	27.97	2/5f	
2016	King Eden	Droopys Scolari – Shaws Dilemma	Liz McNair (Private)	28.46	20/1	
2017	Magical Bale	Zero Ten - Sizzling Sarah	Kevin Hutton (Towcester)	29.10	11/10f	
2018	Argentina	Tyrur Big Mike - Headford Maura	Kevin Hutton (Monmore)	27.50	4/1	
2019	Bockos Doomie	Droopys Jet – Dalcash Kalade	Patrick Janssens (Central Park)	27.24	11/10f	
2020	Surprising	Droopys Sydney – Banabane	Seamus Cahill (Hove)	29.35	11/4cf	
2021	Make Noise	Confident Rankin – Tibet	Seamus Cahill (Hove)	29.71	15/8	
2022	not held due to problems with the weather and rescheduling.					
2023	King Memphis	Droopys Sydney – Queen Beyonce	Liz McNair (Private)	28.82	6/4	
2024	Bombay Birch	Broadstrand Bono – Change Me	Paul Young (Romford)	29.60	9/4	
2025	not held due to unavailability of trials					
