= 1994 English Greyhound Derby =

- Location: Wimbledon Stadium
- Start date: 25 May
- End date: 25 June

The 1994 Daily Mirror/Sporting Life Greyhound Derby took place during May and June with the final being held on 25 June 1994 at Wimbledon Stadium. The winner Moral Standards received £50,000. The competition was sponsored by the Sporting Life and Daily Mirror.

== Final result ==
At Wimbledon (over 480 metres):

Position	Name of Greyhound	Breeding	Trap	SP	Time	Trainer
1st	Moral Standards	Flag Star - No Way Jose	2	9-4f	28.59	Tony Meek (Hall Green)
2nd	Ayr Flyer	Ardfert Sean - Slaneyside Glory	6	3-1	28.69	Dawn Wheatley (Nottingham)
3rd	Moaning Lad	Kyle Jack - Lady Bellamy	5	7-2	28.73	Theo Mentzis (Milton Keynes)
4th	Up The Junction	Slippys Quest - Elf Arrow	1	3-1	28.74	Pat Norris (Ireland)
5th	Flag The Fawn	Druids Johno - Almond Blossom	3	16-1	28.86	Patsy Byrne (Hackney)
6th	Callahow Daly	Daleys Gold - Ahaveen Fever	4	12-1	28.98	Charlie Lister (Peterborough)

=== Distances ===
1¼, ½, short head, 1½, 1½ (lengths)
The distances between the greyhounds are in finishing order and shown in lengths. One length is equal to 0.08 of one second.

== Competition Report ==
Leading contenders for the 1994 Derby included Pall Mall Stakes champion and 1993 finalist Lassa Java and Scottish Greyhound Derby finalist Moral Standards. In round one Moral Standards won in 28.52 and Westmead Chick recorded 28.57. Round two passed with all of the main contenders remaining unbeaten and it was not until the third round that Pearls Girl, Parquet Paddy and Noir Banjo were all eliminated. Moral Standards, Ayr Flyer, track record holder Greenane Squire and Up the Junction all remained unbeaten but Lassa Java sustained a broken hock. Moral Standards became the peoples favourite due to his style of running with late finishes and winning races when it looked impossible to do so.

During the quarter-finals Moaning Lad won again in a fast 28.41 handing a first defeat to Ayr Flyer and Greenane Squire inflicted a first defeat on Up the Junction. Moral Standards and Long Valley Manor also won but Westmead Chick, Westmead Merlin and Ballinderry Sue failed to go any further.

In the first semifinal the sole remaining Irish entry Up The Junction (an odds on favourite) led from Flag The Fawn until close to the finishing line when Moral Standards then made his trademark finish to clinch a late win. The second semi ended with favourite Greenane Squire missing out on the final after Ayr Flyer won from Callahow Daly and Moaning Lad.

In the final Moral Standards won again repeating the feat of racing through the field to win in every round. The greyhound owned by Jim Wenman and John Jefford, was in trap two in the final and he was well backed into 9-4f. The traps lifted with Ayr Flyer and Up the Junction challenging for the lead with Moral Standards sat behind them in third place. Moral Standards then came from behind again to claim a second consecutive Derby for trainer Tony Meek.

The Derby champion was then sold in September to Nottingham owner Terry Corden for a reputed £50,000.

== Quarter-finals ==
Heat 1 (Jun 14)
Pos	Name	SP	Time
1st	Longvalley Manor	11-4	28.70
2nd	Magnetic Ocean	6-4f	28.92
3rd	Fermaine Monarch	16-1	29.02
4th	Moral Director	5-1	29.04
5th	Westmead Merlin	7-2	29.18
6th	Salcombe	8-1	00.00

Heat 2 (Jun 14)
Pos	Name	SP	Time
1st	Moaning Lad	6-4	28.41
2nd	Ayr Flyer	11-10f	28.85
3rd	Druids Elprado	7-1	28.93
4th	Westmead Chick	9-2	28.96
5th	Woodview Brandy	50-1	29.14
6th	Havoc House	20-1	29.15

Heat 3 (Jun 14)
Pos	Name	SP	Time
1st	Greenane Squire	5-2	28.61
2nd	Callahow Daily	14-1	28.67
3rd	Up the Junction	1-1f	29.03
4th	Dennys Bar	33-1	29.11
5th	Ballinderry Sue	4-1	29.53
6th	Snow Flash	10-1	29.67

Heat 4 (Jun 14)
Pos	Name	SP	Time
1st	Moral Standards	4-5f	28.85
2nd	Doreens Hope	20-1	28.91
3rd	Flag The Fawn	3-1	28.97
4th	Ardcollum Hilda	3-1	29.03
5th	Always Good	12-1	29.05
6th	Battstreet Ivy	33-1	29.11

== Semifinals ==
First Semifinal (Jun 18)
Pos	Name of Greyhound	SP	Time	Trainer
1st	Moral Standards	2-1	28.58	Meek
2nd	Up The Junction	8-11f	28.62	Norris
3rd	Flag The Fawn	8-1	28.65	Byrne
4th	Magnetic Ocean	7-1	28.87	Byrne
5th	Fermaine Monarch	66-1	28.93	Savva
6th	Doreens Hope	33-1	29.29	Rees

Second Semifinal (Jun 18)
Pos	Name of Greyhound	SP	Time	Trainer
1st	Ayr Flyer	5-1	28.70	Wheatley
2nd	Callahow Daly	20-1	28.76	Lister
3rd	Moaning Lad	6-4	28.92	Mentzis
4th	Druids Elprado	12-1	29.32	McGee Sr.
5th	Greenane Squire	5-4f	29.40	Meek
6th	Longvalley Manor	14-1	29.60	Coleman

== See also ==
- 1994 UK & Ireland Greyhound Racing Year
