= Pat Mullins (greyhound trainer) =

British and Irish greyhound racing professional trainer

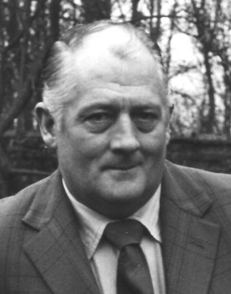

Personal information
- Born: 2 November 1929 Ireland
- Died: 18 March 1981 (aged 51) Manningtree, England
- Occupation: Greyhound Trainer

Sport
- Sport: Greyhound racing

Achievements and titles
- National finals: Derby wins: English Derby (1978); Scottish Derby (1979); Classic/Feature wins: Pall Mall (1979); Grand Prix (1977, 1978, 1980); Gold Collar (1980)

Patrick "Pat" Mullins (2 November 1929 – 18 March 1981), was an Irish born greyhound trainer who was the 1980 champion trainer of Great Britain.

== Personal life ==
He met Linda Chapelle and they had four sons; three of which (John, David and Kelly) became trainers in their own right at later dates. They ran the greyhound business from kennels in Manningtree, Essex. They married in 1980 but Pat collapsed and died while working at the kennels just one year later in 1981.

== Career ==
Mullins initially trained from kennels near Hadleigh, Suffolk and won the 1978 English Greyhound Derby with Lacca Champion. He later trained out of the Old Hall Kennels in Mistley, Manningtree, Essex and won a Scottish Greyhound Derby, Pall Mall, three Grand Prix's and a Gold Collar.

Mullins died in March 1981 and his wife Linda took over the kennels following his death. A memorial meeting was held at White City Stadium, with the proceeds going to his family.

== Awards ==
Despite being Irish born he was voted the United Kingdom Greyhound Trainer of the Year in 1980.
