= 1993 Irish Greyhound Derby =

Dog race

1993 Respond Irish Greyhound Derby
- Venue: Shelbourne Park
- Location: Dublin
- End date: 25 September
- Total prize money: £50,000 (winner)

The 1993 Irish Greyhound Derby took place during August and September with the final being held at Shelbourne Park in Dublin on 25 September 1993.

The winner Daleys Denis won £50,000 and was trained by Brendan Mullan, owned by a syndicate including George Davenport and Patrick Keating and bred by John O'Brien. The race was sponsored by the Kerry Group's dog food product 'Respond'.

== Final result ==
At Shelbourne, 25 September (over 550 yards):

Position	Winner	Breeding	Trap	SP	Time	Trainer
1st	Daleys Denis	Daleys Gold - Lisnakill Flyer	1	11-4	30.30	Brendan Mullan
2nd	Carrigeen Blaze	Adraville Bridge - Carrigeen Lucky	4	5-1	30.42	Donal Carroll
3rd	Kenmare Prince	Castlelyons Gem - Kenmare Bay	5	16-1	30.51	Matt O'Donnell
4th	Radical Prince	Lodge Prince - Garryduff Lassie	3	6-4f	30.54	Eddie Wade
5th	Ballygroman Bill	I'm Slippy - Tailors Rush	2	14-1	30.63	Christy O'Callaghan
6th	Drumsna Queen	Fearless Champ - Slieve Hills	6	5-1	30.64	Pat Quinn

=== Distances ===
1½, 1, neck, 1, short-head (lengths)

== Competition Report ==
Champion greyhound Farloe Melody was brought out of retirement for a third attempt at the classic and was still respected by the bookmakers who priced him up as 14-1 joint ante-post favourite with Lisglass Lass.

Farloe Melody won his qualifying round before a Ger McKenna's entry Crestar set the fastest first round time of 30.29. Lisglass Lass won in 30.33 and the 1993 English Greyhound Derby finalist Greenane Squire posted 30.47. A 16-1 shot Paddys Fox provided the big shock of round two beating Carrigeen Blaze and Daleys Denis in a race where Farloe Melody was eliminated. Greenane Squire won again and 1992 Irish Greyhound Derby finalist Radical Prince impressed.

Under heavy conditions following torrential rain, Lisglass Lass made it no further than the quarter-finals and in the first semi-final a pile up resulted in Radical Prince winning his race by 10 lengths from Daleys Denis and Kenmare Gem in 30.33. The second semi-final resulted in Carrigeen Blaze winning ahead of Drumsna Queen and Ballygroman Bill in 30.20.

In the final Daleys Denis, a white and brindle dog, trained by Brendan Mullan was bred in Surrey by John O’Brien. He had won the Hackney Lead but had gone out early in the English Derby before attempting the Irish equivalent. Well backed in the final Daleys Denis took advantage of early leader Carrigeen Blaze moving wide and became the leader himself at the third bend. The gambled favourite Radical Prince was bumped at the first bend by Ballygroman Bill ending his hopes. Daleys Denis held on well with Carrigeen Blaze remaining second to the line.

Brendan Mullan was the son of Jack Mullan who had trained the Derby winner in 1957 and 1964. Daleys Denis was the first British bred winner of the race (excluding Manx Treasure from the Isle of Man).

== See also ==
- 1993 UK & Ireland Greyhound Racing Year
