= 1996 English Greyhound Derby =

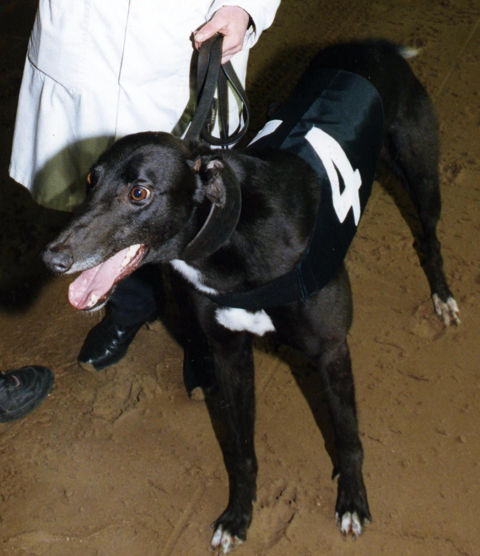
- Night Trooper
- Location: Wimbledon Stadium
- End date: 29 June
- Total prize money: £50,000 (winner)

The 1996 Daily Mirror/Sporting Life Greyhound Derby Final took place during May and June with the final being held on 29 June 1996 at Wimbledon Stadium. The winner Shanless Slippy received £50,000. The competition was sponsored by the Sporting Life and Daily Mirror.

== Race summary ==
In the final Night Trooper broke well pursued by Clonmel Produce Stakes champion Shanless Slippy, the Irish dog then forged out a lead by the first bend and drew clear down the back straight. The 1995 Irish Greyhound Derby champion Batties Rocket was forced to check back at the third bend behind Trooper leaving Shanless Slippy clear. Shanless Slippy remained unbeaten throughout the event and Night Trooper took consolation by winning the Pall Mall Stakes the following year.

== Final result ==
At Wimbledon (over 480 metres):

Position	Name of Greyhound	Breeding	Trap	SP	Time	Trainer
1st	Shanless Slippy	Murlens Slippy - Lisnakill Flyer	3	4-9f	28.66	Dolores Ruth (Ireland)
2nd	Night Trooper	Portrun Flier - Suir Orla	2	16-1	28.86	Nikki Adams (Rye House)
3rd	Batties Rocket	Batties Whisper - Lady Arrancourt	5	5-2	28.98	Matt O'Donnell (Ireland)
4th	Everloving Eddie	Kildare Ash - Ever Loving Doll	6	16-1	28.99	Geoff De Mulder (Hall Green)
5th	Checkpointcharly	Phantom Flash - Ferndale Class	4	50-1	29.23	John Coleman (Walthamstow)
6th	Be Bopa Lola	Guiding Hope - Lulus Zola	1	20-1	29.24	Philip Rees Jr. (Wimbledon)

=== Distances ===
2½, 1½, short head, 3, short head (lengths)
The distances between the greyhounds are in finishing order and shown in lengths. One length is equal to 0.08 of one second.

== See also ==
- 1996 UK & Ireland Greyhound Racing Year
