= Reading Masters =

Greyhound racing competition

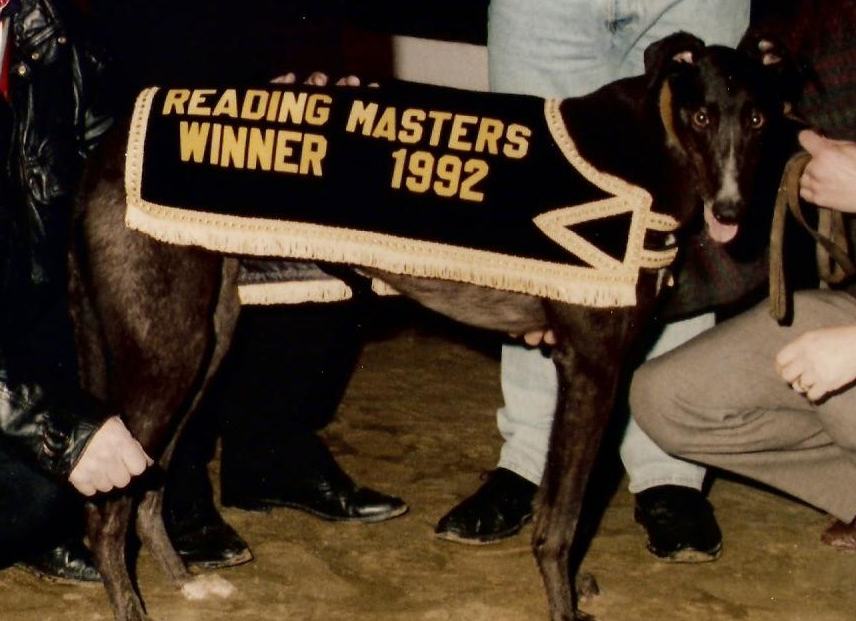
- Dempsey Duke
- Class: Category 1
- Location: Reading Stadium
- Inaugurated: 1992
- Final run: 2007

Race information
- Distance: 465 metres
- Surface: Sand

The Reading Masters was a greyhound competition held at Reading Stadium.

== History ==
The race was held from 1992 until 2007 and the prize money was second only to the English Greyhound Derby. The large prize money fund came virtue of sponsorship by the track bookmakers.

== Past winners ==
Year	Winner	Breeding	Trainer	Time	SP
1992	Dempsey Duke	Shanagarry Duke - Willowbrook Peg	Terry Kibble (Bristol)	28.09 sec	9-4
1993	I'm His	Daleys Gold - Lisnakill Flyer	Eric Jordan (Hove)	28.09 sec	5-4f
1994	Druids Elprado	I'm Slippy - Druids Dalroy	John McGee Sr. (Reading)	27.99 sec	11-8f
1995	Longvalley Manor	I'm Slippy - Long Valley Lady	John Coleman (Walthamstow)	28.35 sec	9-2
1996	Doyougetit	Manx Treasure - Lisnakill Lass	Tony Meek (Hall Green)	27.99 sec	2-5f
1997	Night Trooper	Portrun Flier - Suir Orla	Nikki Adams (Rye House)	27.86 sec	6-1
1998	You Will Call	Super Hoffman - Autumn Lauragh	Jo Burridge (Poole)	27.90 sec	5-1
1999	Torbal Piper	Slaneyside Hare - Debs Tic	Tony Meek (Hall Green)	28.15 sec	14-1
2000	Jicky	Mountleader Peer - Firhouse Lady	Brian Clemenson (Hove)	28.16 sec	11-2
2001	Marshals June	Saradeb - Marshals Rose	Richard Stiles (Reading)	27.99 sec	11-4
2002	Aranock Lance	Trade Official - Aranock Girl	Paul Young (Romford)	27.95 sec	7-1
2003	Blonde Ranger	Come On Ranger - Covert Blossom	John Mullins (Walthamstow)	28.00 sec	6-1
2004	Droopys Chester	Jamella Prince - Droopys Cheryl	Carly Philpott (Private)	27.92 sec	7-1
2005	Killeigh Grand	Top Honcho - Magpie Miss	Charlie Lister OBE (Private)	28.09 sec	1-1f
2006	Farloe Rio	Honcho Classic - Cathy Ann	Paul Hennessy (Ireland)	28.13 sec	5-2
2007	Blitz	Larkhill Jo - Castleboro Katie	Denis Stevenson (Private)	28.03 sec	4-1

Discontinued
