= 1996 UK & Ireland Greyhound Racing Year =

The 1996 UK & Ireland Greyhound Racing Year was the 71st year of greyhound racing in the United Kingdom and the 70th year of greyhound racing in Ireland.

== Roll of honour ==
Major Winners
Award	Name of Winner
1996 English Greyhound Derby	Shanless Slippy
1996 Irish Greyhound Derby	Tina Marina
1996 Scottish Greyhound Derby	Burnpark Lord
Greyhound Trainer of the Year	Linda Mullins
Greyhound of the Year	Spring Rose
Irish Dog and Bitch of the Year	Mountleader Peer / Tina Marina
Trainers Championship	Ernie Gaskin Sr.

== Summary ==
The National Greyhound Racing Club (NGRC) released the annual returns, with totalisator turnover at £73,575,880 from 6384 meetings. The drop in tote turnover could be partly attributed to the first full year of the National Lottery which had begun the previous November.

Spring Rose trained by Charlie Lister was voted Greyhound of the Year after winning the Grand Prix at Walthamstow Stadium and the St Leger at Wembley. She broke the Walthamstow track record twice on her way to winning the Grand Prix and made the St Leger final unbeaten before clocking 39.29 in the final, a new track record.

Linda Mullins became the first woman to win the Greyhound Trainer of the Year.

== Tracks ==
There was no news on the London Stadium (Hackney) which was in administration, the situation looked unsettled despite good reviews about the stadium. It also hosted the Trainers Championship won by Ernie Gaskin Sr.

Ramsgate Stadium was closed by the receivers but sister track Oxford Stadium was bought by Isle of Man businessman Don Joyce who brought in a new general manager Dan McCormack.

Sittingbourne closed following financial problems but was re-opened by Roger Cearns, the grandson of WJ Cearns the founder of Wimbledon Stadium.

The National Lottery was cited as one of the main reasons why Raikes Park Greyhound Stadium in Bolton closed. The site on by the Raikes colliery on the Manchester Road had been one of the most prestigious Independent tracks and hosted the Independent Derby, St Leger and Guineas. It was a major loss within the independent circles and the independents had a bad year because Bury St Edmunds also closed.

== News ==
Former Slough and Wembley trainer Ted Dickson died leaving daughter Hazel to run the kennels on her own. When Ramsgate closed trainer Peter Rich moved to Catford and then Romford in quick succession. Hove trainer Bill Masters retired leaving Alan (Claude) Gardiner to take over the kennel. Gardiner was previously assistant to Brian Clemenson. Romford installed former Bolton Racing Manager Peter O'Dowd as the new Racing Manager to replace Steve Daniel who had only recently replaced Ray Spalding.

The Bord na gCon sold the site of the Cork Greyhound Stadium in Cork and purchased a green-field site in Curraheen on the western fringes of the city with the intention of building a brand new facility there.

The Intertrack betting service was introduced for the first time enabling racegoers at other tracks around the country to view the racing and place bets direct into the Wimbledon tote.

== Competitions ==
A greyhound called Some Picture looked a great prospect after winning the Select Stakes and Eclipse.

== Principal UK races ==
Daily Mirror/Sporting Life Grand National, Hall Green (Mar 27, 474m h, £7,500)
Pos	Name of Greyhound	Trainer	SP	Time	Trap
1st	Dynamic Display	Barry O'Sullivan	7-2	29.23	2
2nd	Diamond Hero	Les Lawrence	7-2	29.25	1
3rd	Fear Faire	Kim Marlow	7-2	29.27	5
4th	Colorado Joker	Maria Nierobisz	5-1	29.39	3
5th	Doctor Fox	David Mullins	3-1f	29.53	4
6th	Ebony Lad	Kim Marlow	9-1	29.61	6

BBC TV Trophy, Walthamstow (Apr 6, 820m, £6,000)
Pos	Name of Greyhound	Trainer	SP	Time	Trap
1st	Suncrest Sail	Charlie Lister	7-2	51.75	2
2nd	Martinstown Gem	Patsy Byrne	3-1	51.87	4
3rd	High Knight	Ernie Gaskin Sr.	9-4f	52.11	1
4th	Miss Piggy	Ann Power	5-2	52.23	6
5th	Autumn Tiger	S Brunt	16-1	52.31	3
6th	Dusty Image	C Finch	50-1	52.71	5

Regal Scottish Derby, Shawfield (Apr 27, 480m, £20,000)
Pos	Name of Greyhound	Trainer	SP	Time	Trap
1st	Burnpark Lord	Dave Hopper	5-2	29.32	1
2nd	Carnegie	John Robinson (Ire)	14-1	29.40	5
3rd	Quick Tune	Gordon Hodson	3-1	29.44	6
4th	Heres Andy	Paul Stringer	6-4f	29.54	2
5th	Cill Dubh Sam	Hazel Dickson	20-1	29.74	4
6th	Murlens Link	Willie Frew	3-1	29.94	3

Reading Masters, Reading (May 13, 465m, £20,000)
Pos	Name of Greyhound	Trainer	SP	Time	Trap
1st	Doyougetit	Tony Meek	2-5f	27.99	6
2nd	Come On Royal	Barry McIntosh	6-1	28.11	3
3rd	Mottos Gold	Arthur Hitch	8-1	28.23	2
4th	El Grand Senor	Linda Mullins	11-2	28.29	1
5th	Mi Cooper	Kennerley	7-1		4
N/R	Gold Dempsey	Terry Kibble			

Scurry Gold Cup, Catford (Jul 13, 385m, £2,500)
Pos	Name of Greyhound	Trainer	SP	Time	Trap
1st	Come On Royal	Barry McIntosh	4-1	23.58	2
2nd	Woodside Erah	Arthur Boyce	7-2	23.64	4
3rd	Aglish Lester	Brian Clemenson	14-1	23.72	3
4th	Chipeta Jack	Tony Taylor	10-1	23.74	5
5th	Lemon Duchess	Ernie Gaskin Sr.	9-2	23.82	1
6th	Tiger Khan	Derek Knight	7-4f	23.90	6

Gold Collar, Catford (Sep 21, 555m, £7,500)
Pos	Name of Greyhound	Trainer	SP	Time	Trap
1st	Homeside Knight	Tom Gates	7-1	34.80	3
2nd	Away Duke	Derek Knight	9-4	34.81	1
3rd	El Tenor	Linda Mullins	8-11f	34.82	4
4th	Square Penny	Derek Knight	10-1	34.84	6
5th	Heros Morsel	Linda Mullins	33-1	34.96	5
N/R	Coom Cruiser	Derek Knight			

Laurent-Perrier Grand Prix, Walthamstow (Oct 5, 640m, £7,500)
Pos	Name of Greyhound	Trainer	SP	Time	Trap
1st	Spring Rose	Charlie Lister	4-7f	39.05+	6
2nd	Sadlers Return	Ernie Gaskin Sr.	9-2	39.61	2
3rd	Level Coaster	Bob Hall	9-2	39.71	5
4th	Deenside Sport	Dick Hawkes	25-1	39.87	1
5th	Honest Guv	Chris Duggan	50-1	40.11	3
6th	Hilton Patch	Natalie Savva	14-1	40.31	4

+Track Record

Ike Morris Laurels, Wimbledon (Oct 12, 460m, £7,500)
Pos	Name of Greyhound	Trainer	SP	Time	Trap
1st	El Grand Senor	Linda Mullins	9-4f	27.52	1
2nd	Pavilion Rock	Sam Sykes	11-4	27.94	2
3rd	Sandwichsunshine	Peter Rich	4-1	27.98	5
4th	Im Trigo	Tom Foster	10-1	27.99	4
5th	Killila Johno	Sam Sykes	20-1	28.09	6
6th	Night Trooper	Nikki Adams	7-2	28.29	3

Wendy Fair St Leger, Wembley (Nov 15, 655m, £12,000)
Pos	Name of Greyhound	Trainer	SP	Time	Trap
1st	Spring Rose	Charlie Lister	2-5f	39.29+	6
2nd	Wise Beauty	Patsy Byrne	7-1	39.91	2
3rd	Dinan Wonder	Charlie Lister	10-1	39.93	1
4th	Bonnies Major	Steve Davis	10-1	40.09	5
5th	Level Coaster	Bob Hall	12-1	40.11	4
6th	One For Tarbert	Graham Holland	33-1	40.63	3

+Track Record

Cesarewitch, Catford (Dec 7, 718m, £5,000)
Pos	Name of Greyhound	Trainer	SP	Time	Trap
1st	Elbony Rose	Nick Savva	11-10f	45.90	2
2nd	Love of You	Tom Foster	7-2	45.93	1
3rd	Misties Cloud	Hazel Dickson	9-2	45.95	6
4th	Orizontals Star	Tony Taylor	10-1	46.15	5
5th	Bubbly Boy	Linda Jones	6-1	46.17	4
6th	Countrywide Lass	Peter Rich	25-1	46.67	3

Oaks, Wimbledon (Dec 14, 480m, £6,000)
Pos	Name of Greyhound	Trainer	SP	Time	Trap
1st	Annies Bullet	Nick Savva	7-4jf	28.76	4
2nd	Be Bopa Lola	Phil Rees Jr.	7-4jf	29.00	3
3rd	Clodeen Magic	Brian Clemenson	11-4	29.06	2
4th	Freds Flame	Graham Sharp	25-1	29.12	5
5th	Pams Wizard	Jim Reynolds	6-1	29.44	6
N/R	Roses Opinion	Mick Puzey			

== Totalisator returns ==
Extended content

The totalisator returns declared to the National Greyhound Racing Club for the year 1996 are listed below.

Stadium	Turnover £
London (Walthamstow)	11,235,549
London (Wimbledon)	7,606,497
Romford	5,989,366
Brighton & Hove	4,565,571
Birmingham (Hall Green)	4,527,118
Manchester (Belle Vue)	3,984,297
London (Catford)	3,769,208
Crayford	2,424,532
Sheffield (Owlerton)	2,359,515
Birmingham (Perry Barr)	2,305,608
Peterborough	2,045,249
London (Wembley)	2,011,499
Sunderland	1,685,804

Stadium	Turnover £
Glasgow (Shawfield)	1,678,487
London (Hackney)	1,650,000
Wolverhampton (Monmore)	1,423,000
Portsmouth	1,332,268
Bristol	1,323,050
Yarmouth	1,240,261
Newcastle (Brough Park)	1,231,215
Oxford	1,082,732
Reading	1,041,505
Milton Keynes	1,011,687
Bolton	874,940
Nottingham	848,833
Canterbury	628,548

Stadium	Turnover £
Swindon	511,529
Harlow	505,855
Sittingbourne	480,000
Hull (New Craven Park)	450,000
Rye House	343,820
Middlesbrough	291,611
Doncaster (Stainforth)	278,736
Ramsgate	234,000
Swaffham	221,447
Mildenhall	189,171
Henlow (Bedfordshire)	181,972
Dundee	11,400
