= 1993 UK & Ireland Greyhound Racing Year =

The 1993 UK & Ireland Greyhound Racing Year was the 68th year of greyhound racing in the United Kingdom and the 67th year of greyhound racing in Ireland.

== Roll of honour ==
Major Winners
| Award | Name of Winner |
|---|---|
| 1993 English Greyhound Derby | Ringa Hustle |
| 1993 Irish Greyhound Derby | Daleys Denis |
| 1993 Scottish Greyhound Derby | New Level |
| Greyhound Trainer of the Year | John McGee Sr. |
| Greyhound of the Year | Heavenly Lady |
| Irish Greyhound of the Year | Ringa Hustle |
| Trainers Championship | Linda Mullins |

== Summary ==
The National Greyhound Racing Club (NGRC) released the annual returns, with totalisator turnover at £88,170,111 and attendances recorded at 3,859,498 from 6054 meetings.

The Linda Mullins trained Heavenly Lady won the 1993 Greyhound of the Year after collecting 17 of the 21 votes available. The black bitch won 25 of her 49 races including the Golden Jacket, Cearns Memorial and TV Trophy. Ringa Hustle was voted Irish Greyhound of the Year after winning the 1993 English Greyhound Derby.

John McGee won the Greyhound Trainer of the Year for the sixth successive year.

The first ever British Greyhound Racing Fund budget of £840,000 was distributed as follows - £210,000 to drug testing, £248,000 to chromatography, £180,000 in track grants, £100,000 in prize money, £50,000 to a national inter track and £42,000 to the Retired Greyhound Trust.

== News ==
The Greyhound Racing Association (GRA) parent company Wembley plc. suffered financial difficulties having to service a £13 million debt. The company's American greyhound operation saw profits fall from £5.9 to £3.3 million. The British tracks were faring better making a £2.1 million profit but that made little difference to the overall debt problems.

The debt ridden Brent Walker the owners of Hackney Wick Stadium were on the verge of selling William Hill to avoid administration.

The inconsistency of chromatography is highlighted during the Oaks at Wimbledon Stadium, the pre-meeting test for a bitch called Ballinderry Gown indicates a problem and she is withdrawn from the first round, an immediate second is taken and is negative. The chromatography system has been widely criticised as being inaccurate and unreliable and although used at all licensed tracks the decision is made to phase out the system. The NGRC plans for a new more reliable system to be put into place with future samples taken by 'the flying squad' (members of unannounced staff from the NGRC taking random samples). The samples would then be tested at the Horseracing Forensic Laboratory (HFL).

Mick Smith becomes Racing Manager at Wembley and Simon Harris switched to Wimbledon from Hall Green to be replaced by Gary Woodward. Dave Lawrence steps in at Bristol to replace the parting Woodward. Dave Baldwin replaces Dave Gunson at Sheffield. Trainer changes during the year saw Derby winning trainer Tony Meek leave Hall Green, David Mullins leave Sunderland for Catford and Pa Fitzgerald joined Reading as a trainer in his own right after helping Patsy Byrne for many years. Reading would also announce the arrival of champion trainer John McGee, his third track in four years. Reading continued to be in the news and this time it was because they increased their Reading Masters prize to a fabulous £20,000. Ken Peckham died just seven years after the exploits of the brilliant Scurlogue Champ. Manx Treasure enjoying success at stud died of cancer aged just three and a half.

Poor Sue retired with a race record of 77 open race wins from 157 races (a new record for open race wins).

== Competitions ==
Kildare Slippy made his third consecutive Grand National final but age was getting the better of him as he was easily beaten by favourite Arfur Daley. Kind of Magic trained by Litzi Miller went one place better than the previous year in the Scurry Gold Cup final at Catford Stadium and this time lifted the trophy. Beaten finalist Ardcollum Hilda achieved a good win the following month when she won the Gold Collar at Catford Stadium over a longer distance at the same track.

Redwood Girl trained by Ernies Gaskin Sr. won the Grand Prix at Walthamstow Stadium, the competition had attracted a good entry and in the final the brindle bitch defeated hot favourite Loch Bo Anchor competing in his second classic final and Heavenly Lady. She would also reach the Oaks final towards the end of the year finishing third behind Pearls Girl. Derby finalist Hypnotic Stag won the Blue Riband and Olympic.

== Principal UK races ==
Daily Mirror/Sporting Life Grand National, Hall Green (Mar 31, 474m h, £5,000)
| Pos | Name of Greyhound | Trainer | SP | Time | Trap |
|---|---|---|---|---|---|
| 1st | Arfur Daley | Bert Meadows | 5-4f | 28.89 | 2 |
| 2nd | Ring Patriot | Gordon Hodson | 25-1 | 29.09 | 4 |
| 3rd | Top Show | Derek Knight | 5-1 | 29.19 | 6 |
| 4th | Shanavulin Jacko | Peter Payne | 10-1 | 29.25 | 3 |
| 5th | Jolly Joker | Philip Rees Jr. | 12-1 | 29.37 | 1 |
| 6th | Kildare Slippy | Paddy Hancox | 2-1 | 29.69 | 5 |

BBC TV Trophy, Wimbledon (Apr 20, 820m, £6,000)
| Pos | Name of Greyhound | Trainer | SP | Time | Trap |
|---|---|---|---|---|---|
| 1st | Heavenly Lady | Linda Mullins | 6-1 | 51.40 | 1 |
| 2nd | Poor Sue | Stan Kennett | 20-1 | 51.56 | 4 |
| 3rd | Hillview Sand | Kenny Linzell | 16-1 | 51.68 | 2 |
| 4th | Airmount Flash | Jimmy Gibson | 11-4 | 51.74 | 3 |
| 5th | Westmead Birdie | Olabode Ayegun | 5-4f | 51.75 | 6 |
| 6th | Nice Enecee | Dawn Milligan | 5-1 | 53.33 | 5 |

Reading Masters, Reading (May 1, 465m, £20,000)
| Pos | Name of Greyhound | Trainer | SP | Time | Trap |
|---|---|---|---|---|---|
| 1st | Im His | Eric Jordan | 5-4f | 28.09 | 4 |
| 2nd | Bonney Seven | John Coleman | 5-2 | 28.27 | 5 |
| 3rd | Exile Again | Tony Meek | 10-1 | 28.29 | 2 |
| 4th | Glengar Chipper | Mrs L Berry | 14-1 | 28.33 | 6 |
| 5th | Ettas Star | Pete Wellon | 5-1 | 28.61 | 1 |
| 6th | King Size | S Burke | 5-1 | 28.63 | 3 |

Regal Scottish Derby, Shawfield (May 15, 500m, £20,000)
| Pos | Name of Greyhound | Trainer | SP | Time | Trap |
|---|---|---|---|---|---|
| 1st | New Level | Harry Williams | 3-1 | 30.22 | 3 |
| 2nd | Unique Bay | Linda Mullins | 5-4f | 30.23 | 5 |
| 3rd | Premier Slippy | J Johnston Ire | 8-1 | 30.39 | 2 |
| 4th | Droopys Slave | Charlie Lister | 8-1 | 30.40 | 1 |
| 5th | Highmoor Valley | Pixton | 16-1 | 30.58 | 4 |
| 6th | Old Money | Barry Silkman | 7-2 | 30.60 | 6 |

Fosters Scurry Gold Cup, Catford (Jul 10, 385m, £2,500)
| Pos | Name of Greyhound | Trainer | SP | Time | Trap |
|---|---|---|---|---|---|
| 1st | Kind of Magic | Litzi Miller | 5-1 | 23.82 | 3 |
| 2nd | Quality Arms | Paddy Milligan | 6-1 | 23.90 | 4 |
| 3rd | Ardcollum Hilda | Patsy Byrne | 5-1 | 24.10 | 1 |
| 4th | Crossdrum Damien | Shirley Riches | 25-1 | 24.22 | 5 |
| 5th | Dell Dale | Ernie Gaskin Sr. | 9-4 | 24.42 | 6 |
| 6th | Slippy Corner | Paddy Milligan | 6-4f | 24.52 | 2 |

John Humphreys Gold Collar, Catford (Sep 18, 555m, £7,500)
| Pos | Name of Greyhound | Trainer | SP | Time | Trap |
|---|---|---|---|---|---|
| 1st | Ardcollum Hilda | Patsy Byrne | 5-4f | 34.84 | 6 |
| 2nd | Seskin Support | Henry Tasker | 4-1 | 35.04 | 1 |
| 3rd | Loch Bo Anchor | John McGee Sr. | 5-2 | 35.18 | 3 |
| 4th | Bridies Secret | Derek Knight | 25-1 | 35.42 | 4 |
| 5th | Shropshire Nick | Brian Clemenson | 25-1 | 35.46 | 5 |
| 6th | Blackstairs Boy | Brian Clemenson | 7-1 | 35.70 | 2 |

Fosters Cesarewitch, Belle Vue (Sep 25, 853m, £10,000)
| Pos | Name of Greyhound | Trainer | SP | Time | Trap |
|---|---|---|---|---|---|
| 1st | Killenagh Dream | Charlie Lister | 20-1 | 55.21 | 3 |
| 2nd | Placid Who | | 5-1 | 55.61 | 5 |
| 3rd | Spenwood Magic | Charlie Lister | 11-4 | 55.63 | 6 |
| 4th | Redwood Pippin | Ernie Gaskin Sr. | 5-2f | 55.65 | 1 |
| 5th | Killeenagh Bibi | Barbara Smith | 7-1 | 56.23 | 2 |
| 6th | Mossfield Fire | Russ Kinsey | 4-1 | 56.31 | 4 |

Laurent-Perrier Grand Prix, Walthamstow (Oct 9, 640m, £7,500)
| Pos | Name of Greyhound | Trainer | SP | Time | Trap |
|---|---|---|---|---|---|
| 1st | Redwood Girl | Ernie Gaskin | 5-1 | 39.89 | 1 |
| 2nd | Loch Bo Anchor | John McGee Sr. | 4-5f | 40.05 | 5 |
| 3rd | My Ciara | Linda Mullins | 25-1 | 40.13 | 6 |
| 4th | Capolla Tom | John Coleman | 33-1 | 40.37 | 4 |
| 5th | Heavenly Lady | Linda Mullins | 11-2 | 40.47 | 2 |
| 6th | Gunboat Jeff | Joe Kenny | 9-2 | 40.48 | 3 |

Ike Morris Laurels, Wimbledon (Oct 12, 460m, £7,500)
| Pos | Name of Greyhound | Trainer | SP | Time | Trap |
|---|---|---|---|---|---|
| 1st | Slipaway Jaydee | John McGee Sr. | 9-4 | 27.61 | 4 |
| 2nd | Toms Lodge | Norman Johnson | 4-1 | 27.75 | 2 |
| 3rd | Farmer Patrick | Terry Dartnall | 7-4f | 27.89 | 6 |
| 4th | Alans Wonder | Norman Johnson | 16-1 | 28.03 | 5 |
| 5th | Glengar Chipper | Mrs L Berry | 12-1 | 28.15 | 1 |
| 6th | Our Timmy | James Barrett | 5-1 | 28.29 | 3 |

Wendy Fair St Leger, Wembley (Nov 12, 655m, £10,000)
| Pos | Name of Greyhound | Trainer | SP | Time | Trap |
|---|---|---|---|---|---|
| 1st | Galleydown Boy | John Copplestone | 13-2 | 40.06 | 1 |
| 2nd | Gunboat Jeff | Patsy Byrne | 6-4f | 40.14 | 5 |
| 3rd | Highmoor Glen | Charlie Lister | 3-1 | 40.24 | 6 |
| 4th | Loch Bo Anchor | John McGee Sr. | 14-1 | 40.30 | 2 |
| 5th | Jubilee Rebecca | Gordon Rooks | 9-1 | 40.33 | 3 |
| 6th | The Great Gonzo | Natalie Savva | 6-1 | 40.35 | 4 |

St Marys Hospital Oaks, Wimbledon (Dec 18, 480m, £6,000)
| Pos | Name of Greyhound | Trainer | SP | Time | Trap |
|---|---|---|---|---|---|
| 1st | Pearls Girl | Sam Sykes | 8-11f | 28.55 | 5 |
| 2nd | Simply Free | Charlie Lister | 7-4 | 28.59 | 1 |
| 3rd | Redwood Girl | Ernie Gaskin Sr. | 12-1 | 28.83 | 3 |
| 4th | Stouke Tania | Walter Cowans | 12-1 | 28.89 | 6 |
| 5th | Fast Off | Terry Dartnall | 6-1 | 29.15 | 4 |
| 6th | Westmead Mystic | Natalie Savva | 25-1 | 29.17 | 2 |

== Totalisator returns ==
Extended content

The totalisator returns declared to the National Greyhound Racing Club for the year 1993 are listed below.

| Stadium | Turnover £ |
|---|---|
| London (Walthamstow) | 12,792,314 |
| London (Wimbledon) | 11,454,253 |
| Romford | 7,218,562 |
| Birmingham (Hall Green) | 5,253,442 |
| Brighton & Hove | 5,119,748 |
| London (Catford) | 4,875,779 |
| Manchester (Belle Vue) | 4,579,486 |
| London (Wembley) | 3,291,898 |
| Crayford | 2,775,235 |
| Glasgow (Shawfield) | 2,665,568 |
| Sheffield (Owlerton) | 1,935,404 |
| Sunderland | 1,934,577 |

| Stadium | Turnover £ |
|---|---|
| Birmingham (Perry Barr) | 1,902,770 |
| Newcastle (Brough Park) | 1,867,195 |
| Peterborough | 1,754,275 |
| Oxford | 1,545,335 |
| Yarmouth | 1,472,310 |
| Portsmouth | 1,459,270 |
| Reading | 1,373,859 |
| Edinburgh (Powderhall) | 1,303,237 |
| Ramsgate | 1,293,515 |
| Bristol | 1,216,128 |
| Canterbury | 882,275 |
| Nottingham | 810,403 |

| Stadium | Turnover £ |
|---|---|
| Milton Keynes | 709,117 |
| Swindon | 684,719 |
| Doncaster (Stainforth) | 632,472 |
| London (Hackney) | 542,700 |
| Henlow (Bedfordshire) | 444,600 |
| Cradley Heath | 366,518 |
| Hull (New Craven Park) | 353,507 |
| Mildenhall | 94,927 |
| Middlesbrough | 94,475 |
| Rye House | 55,154 |
| Swaffham | 36,427 |
