= Paddy Milligan =

British and Irish greyhound racing professional trainer

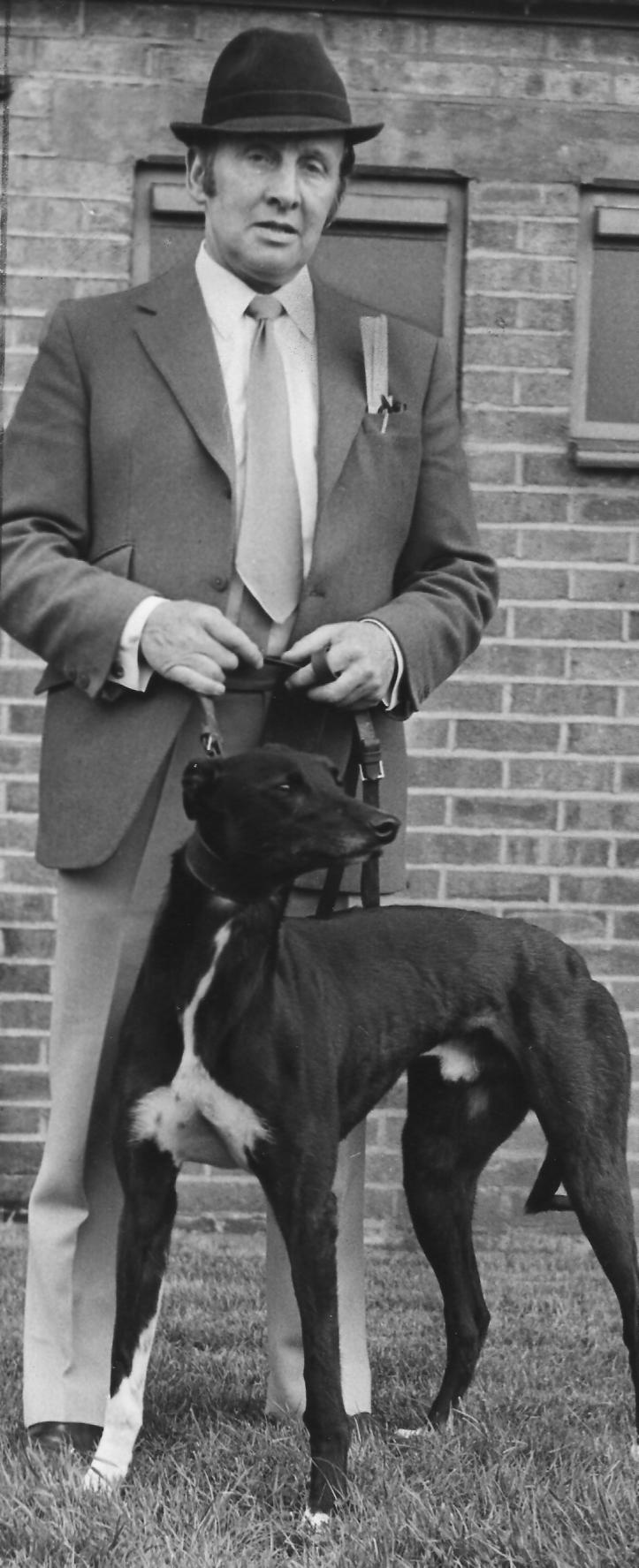
- Paddy Milligan with Mickey Finn

Personal information
- Born: 26 November 1916 Derry, Ireland
- Died: April 2001 aged 84 Bromley, England
- Occupation: Greyhound Trainer

Sport
- Sport: Greyhound racing

Achievements and titles
- National finals: Derby wins: Scottish Derby (1966); Welsh Derby (1975); Classic/Feature wins: Gold Collar (1968, 1979); Scurry Gold Cup (1991); The Puppy Derby (1971), (1973), (1974); All England Cup (1978); Pall Mall Stakes (1966); Edinburgh Cup (1968), (1975); Select Stakes (1966), (1975)

Samuel "Paddy" Risk Milligan (26 November 1916 – April 2001), was an Irish born greyhound trainer. He was twice United Kingdom Trainer of the Year in 1966 and 1975.

== Profile ==
Based from Beaverwood Kennels, Perry Street in Chislehurst he produced a string of major competition winners. He maintained the status of a private trainer from 1966 until 1983 before joining Catford Stadium as an attached trainer.

== Success ==
He came to prominence in 1966 when a greyhound called Dusty Trail finished runner-up in the 1966 English Greyhound Derby. The greyhound went on to become the Greyhound of the Year after winning the Scottish Greyhound Derby, finishing runner-up in the Welsh Greyhound Derby and winning both the International and Pall Mall Stakes.

In 1968 he trained Yellow Printer and steered Shanes Rocket to success in the Gold Collar. Two more Derby finalists arrived during the 1970 English Greyhound Derby when Hymus Silver finished fourth and the 1972 English Greyhound Derby when Scintillas Gem also finished fourth, behind the great Patricias Hope. He then reached two more Derby finals in 1974 and 1975 with Handy High and Foreign Exchange respectively before winning the 1975 Welsh Derby with Baffling Bart and the 1979 Gold Collar with Gayflash.

In addition he also won three Puppy Derbys, three Wembley Spring Cups, two Select Stakes, two Wood Lane Stakes, two Edinburgh Cups, the All England Cup, Ebor Stakes, Essex Vase, Greenwich Cup, Golden Jacket, Select Stakes, Longcross Cup, Steel City Cup, Sussex Cup, Coronation Stakes and a Scurry Gold Cup.

He relinquished his licence during 1996 and his racing kennels in Chislehurst were taken over by Seamus Cahill.

Towards the end of his career he sat on the BGRB board. In 1999 the Beaverwood Kennels were demolished making way for a health and fitness centre.

== Awards ==
He received the ultimate accolade by twice winning the United Kingdom Trainer of the Year in 1966 and 1975.
