= 1987 Irish Greyhound Derby =

1987 edition of the Irish Greyhound Derby

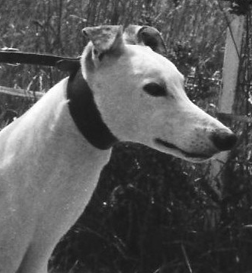
- Gino, represented the UK and Tony Meek in the final
- Venue: Shelbourne Park
- Location: Dublin
- End date: September 19
- Total prize money: £27,500 (winner)

The 1987 Irish Greyhound Derby took place during August and September with the final being held at Shelbourne Park in Dublin on 19 September 1987.

The winner Rathgallen Tady won £27,500 and was trained by Ger McKenna and owned by Eddie Costello and bred by Colm McCarthy. The competition was sponsored by Carrolls for the final time.

== Final result ==
At Shelbourne, 20 September (over 550 yards):

Position	Winner	Breeding	Trap	SP	Time	Trainer
1st	Rathgallen Tady	Overdraught Pet - Mea West	6	8-1	30.49	Ger McKenna
2nd	Carters Lad	Linda's Champion - Carters Lass	5	9-4jf	30.50	M McCall
3rd	Randy	Aulton Villa - Melanie	2	9-2	30.62	Christy Daly
4th	Ardfert Sean	Easy and Slow - Keilduff Fun	1	9-4jf	30.68	Matt O'Donnell
5th	Gino	Ballyheigue Moon - Model Snowdrop	3	7-1	30.69	Tony Meek
6th	Balalika	Moral Support - Bonvella	4	5-1	30.81	Ger McKenna

=== Distances ===
short-head, 1½, ¾, short-head, 1½ (lengths)

== Competition Report ==
The competition started with round one as usual and Ardfert Sean was fastest in 30.33. Carters Lad and Champion Stakes winner Lisroe Pride both well.

In round two carters Lad won in 30.41 and Oughter Brigg in 30.42. Laurels winner Yellow Bud also went well recording 30.43. Odell King set the fastest time in the third round when winning in 30.33. English challenger Gino won in 30.54, Ardfert Sean in 30.53 and Carters Lad 30.63.

The semi-finals started with Randy defeating Balalika in 30.43, before Ardfert Sean defeated Rathgallen Tady in 30.60. Finally Carters Lad lost his unbeaten record to Tony Meek's Gino in 30.44. The six finalists all looked capable of winning the event based on their qualifying.

An outsider of the field Rathgallen Tady recorded his first win when it mattered by winning the fina). He held off a spirited challenge by kennelmate Balalika and then at the line a late burst by 1986 Irish Greyhound Derby finalist Carters Lad to win by a short head. Leading owner Eddie Costello had won his first Irish Derby but fate dealt a huge blow because he was at his London home mourning the death of his wife Grace 24 hours earlier.

== See also ==
- 1987 UK & Ireland Greyhound Racing Year
