= Greyhound Trainer of the Year =

British greyhound racing award

Trainer of the Year
- Inaugurated: 1961

Race information
- Record: Mark Wallis (16 titles)

The Greyhound Trainer of the Year or Champion Trainer is an award for the leading greyhound trainer in the United Kingdom.

It was inaugurated in 1961 and was originally elected by a press panel but is now awarded to the trainer who achieves the most points for winning open races on the Greyhound Board of Great Britain annual racing calendar.

Mark Wallis has won the most titles with 16, he set a new record at the end of 2016, passing the previous record of seven set by John 'Ginger' McGee Sr. and has extended the record to 14 with further wins in 2017, 2018, 2019, 2021, 2022 and 2023.

The award should not be confused with the Trainers Championship which is an annual event held between the leading six trainers.

== Past winners ==
Year	Winner	Attached Racecourse	Notes
1961	Jack Harvey	(Wembley)	joint winner
1961	Jimmy Jowett	(Clapton)	joint winner
1962	John Haynes	(Private)	
1963	Tom Johnston Jr.	(West Ham)	
1964	Harry Bamford	(Private)	
1965	Jim Hookway	(Owlerton)	joint winner
1965	John Bassett	(Private)	joint winner
1966	Paddy Milligan	(Private)	
1967	Jim Hookway	(Owlerton)	
1968	Phil Rees Sr.	(Wimbledon)	
1969	Phil Rees Sr.	(Wimbledon)	
1970	Stan Mitchell	(Belle Vue)	
1971	Herbert White	(Private)	
1972	Tom Johnston Jr.	(Wembley)	
1973	Norman Oliver	(Brough Park)	
1974	John Coleman	(Wembley)	
1975	Paddy Milligan	(Private)	
1976	Phil Rees Sr.	(Wimbledon)	
1977	Ted Dickson	(Slough)	
1978	Geoff De Mulder	(Coventry)	
1979	Geoff De Mulder	(Hall Green)	
1980	Pat Mullins	(Cambridge)	
1981	Joe Cobbold	(Cambridge)	
1982	Adam Jackson	(Wembley)	
1983	George Curtis	(Brighton)	
1984	George Curtis	(Brighton)	
1985	Kenny Linzell	(Walthamstow)	
1986	George Curtis	(Brighton)	
1987	Fred Wiseman	(Private)	
1988	John McGee Sr.	(Canterbury)	
1989	John McGee Sr.	(Canterbury)	
1990	John McGee Sr.	(Hackney)	
1991	John McGee Sr.	(Peterborough)	
1992	John McGee Sr.	(Private)	

Year	Winner	Attached Racecourse	Notes
1993	John McGee Sr.	(Reading)	
1994	John McGee Sr.	(Reading)	
1995	John Coleman	(Walthamstow)	
1996	Linda Mullins	(Walthamstow)	
1997	Linda Mullins	(Walthamstow)	
1998	Linda Mullins	(Walthamstow)	
1999	Linda Mullins	(Walthamstow)	
2000	Linda Mullins	(Walthamstow)	
2001	Linda Jones	(Walthamstow)	
2002	Linda Jones	(Walthamstow)	
2003	Charlie Lister OBE	(Private)	
2004	Charlie Lister OBE	(Private)	
2005	Mark Wallis	(Walthamstow)	
2006	Charlie Lister OBE	(Private)	
2007	Charlie Lister OBE	(Private)	
2008	Mark Wallis	(Walthamstow)	
2009	Mark Wallis	(Harlow)	
2010	Seamus Cahill	(Hove)	
2011	Chris Allsopp	(Monmore)	
2012	Mark Wallis	(Yarmouth)	
2013	Mark Wallis	(Yarmouth)	
2014	Mark Wallis	(Yarmouth)	
2015	Mark Wallis	(Towcester)	
2016	Mark Wallis	(Towcester)	
2017	Mark Wallis	(Towcester)	
2018	Mark Wallis	(Henlow)	
2019	Mark Wallis	(Henlow)	
2020	Patrick Janssens	(Central Park)	
2021	Mark Wallis	(Henlow)	
2022	Mark Wallis	(Henlow)	
2023	Mark Wallis	(Suffolk Downs)	
2024	Mark Wallis	(Suffolk Downs)	
2025	Mark Wallis	(Private)	
