= Ted Dickson =

British greyhound racing professional trainer

Personal information
- Born: 2 March 1923 Edinburgh, Scotland
- Died: 22 May 1996 (aged 73) Bracknell, England
- Occupation: Greyhound trainer

Sport
- Sport: Greyhound racing

Achievements and titles
- National finals: Classic/Feature wins: St Leger (1985); Laurels (1977); Scurry Gold Cup (1978), (1980); Grand Prix (1979); Pall Mall Stakes (1977); Edinburgh Cup (1977); Golden Jacket (1978)

Edward Brown "Ted" Dickson (2 March 1923 – 22 May 1996) was a United Kingdom greyhound trainer. He was the UK champion trainer in 1977.

== Profile ==
Ted Dickson began his career working as a kennel boy for Norman Chambers at Powderhall Stadium in Edinburgh. In 1960 he took out a private trainers licence before joining Slough Stadium in 1970.

Dickson came to prominence in 1973 with a classic finalist when Sunny Gold reached the Laurels final while he was a trainer at Slough. Four years later he won the Laurels, with Greenfield Fox and Linacre won the English Greyhound Derby Invitation. This culminated with him becoming the Greyhound Trainer of the Year.

In 1978 and 1980 he won the Scurry Gold Cup, the only occasions that Slough had won the event. Further success when he won the Trainers Championship twice in 1978 and 1980 respectively. He was based out of the Smoothfield Farm Kennels, off Winkfield Lane in Windsor. He joined Wembley from Slough on 1 September 1985. This brought more success when Jet Circle won the 1985 St Leger.

Ted's daughter Hazel Dickson became heavily involved in the day-to-day running of the kennels before Ted died in 1996, leaving the kennels to be run by Hazel. Hazel continued to impress for the next decade winning the Pall Mall Stakes and the Golden Jacket but retired in 2000.
