= 1996 Irish Greyhound Derby =

Irish greyhound racing event

1996 Respond Irish Greyhound Derby
- Venue: Shelbourne Park
- Location: Dublin
- End date: 30 September
- Total prize money: £50,000 (winner)

The 1996 Irish Greyhound Derby took place during August and September with the final being held at Shelbourne Park in Dublin on 30 September 1996.

The winner Tina Marina won £50,000 and was trained by Seamus Graham, owned by the Greenvale Syndicate (consisting of Michael Butler Sr., Michael Butler Jr., Michael McElhatton, Sean Muldoon and Aidan O'Regan) and bred by Lizzie Maher. The race was sponsored by the Kerry Group's dog food product 'Respond'.

== Final result ==
At Shelbourne, 30 September (over 550 yards):

Position	Winner	Breeding	Trap	SP	Time	Trainer
1st	Tina Marina	Phantom Flash - Minnies Nikita	4	14-1	30.20	Seamus Graham
2nd	Mountleader Peer	Tapwatcher - Mountleader Emer	3	2-1	30.23	Christy O'Callghan
3rd	Spiral Nikita	Phantom Flash - Minnies Nikita	1	7-4f	30.43	Eileen Gleeson
4th	Deerfield Bypass	Daleys Gold - Black Adraville	2	7-1	30.90	Ger McKenna
5th	Emly Express	Boyne Walk - Wise up Jim	5	7-1	31.02	Chris Locke
6th	Sir Grand	Flashy Sir - Always Grand	6	4-1	31.03	Matt O'Donnell

=== Distances ===
neck, 2½, 5¾, 1½, short-head (lengths)

== Competition Report ==
Matt O'Donnell had two major challengers in the defending champion Batties Rocket and his sister Batties Spirit whilst Mountleader Peer edged the pair in the ante-post betting after a win in the Febo Champions Stakes and a sequence of nine straight wins.

It was the Christy O'Callaghan brindle Mountleader Peer that showed first recording a fast 30.20 in qualifying. During the first round the 28.70 Kilkenny Greyhound Stadium record holder Spiral Nikita impressed with a 30.10 and Batties Spirit also went well winning in a time just six spots (0.06) slower. Batties Spirit completed three wins in a row with the fastest second round time of 30.17; Mountleader Peer took his record to twelve consecutive wins beating Spiral Nikita in the process.

The quarter-finals produced a sensation which resulted in the disqualification of Executive Jet in one heat and a shock victory for Brickfield Blaze from Batties Rocket in another. Emly Express also won but Batties Spirit lost leaving just Mountleader Peer unbeaten and 13 in a row.

In the first semi-final Mountleader Peer was surprisingly caught after leading, leaving Sir Grand a short head winner over Spiral Nikita and the defending champion Batties Rocket was eliminated. The run of wins for Mountleader Peer had come to an end. The second semi-final saw Deerfield Bypass claim the win from Emly Express and Tina Marina but Batties Spirit missed out on a place in the final after only finishing fourth.

Rank outsider Tina Marina was first out of the traps and at the first bend Deerfield Bypass tangled with Emly Express at the same time that Tina Marina, and Spiral Nikita clipped each other. Mountleader Peer missed the trouble and was able to gain what looked like an unbeatable six length advantage but Tina Marina and Spiral Nikita both made ground on the leader as the race progressed. The 14-1 shot Tina Marina then caught Mountleader Peer just before the finishing line to win the £50,000 first prize on offer.

== See also ==
- 1996 UK & Ireland Greyhound Racing Year
