= 1993 English Greyhound Derby =

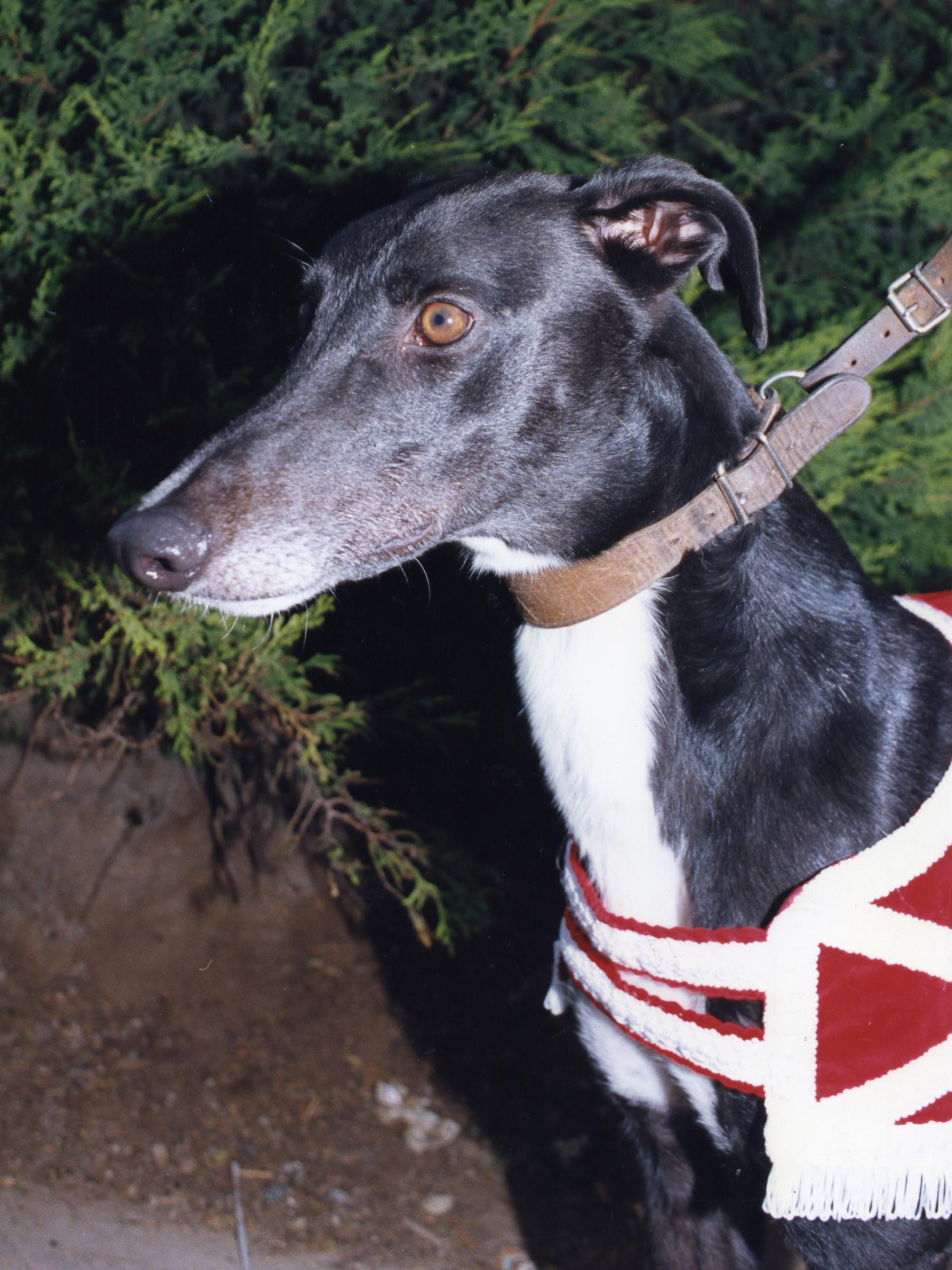
- Ringa Hustle
- Location: Wimbledon Stadium
- Total prize money: £40,000 (winner)

The 1993 Daily Mirror/Sporting Life Greyhound Derby took place during May and June with the final being held on 26 June 1993 at Wimbledon Stadium. The winner Ringa Hustle received £40,000. The competition was sponsored by the Sporting Life and Daily Mirror.

== Competition Report ==
Four greyhounds topped the ante-post lists at 25–1, they were Daleys Denis, Murlens Abbey, Manx Treasure and Skip Pass.

Hypnotic Stag, Daleys Denis and Ringa Hustle all won early heats, the latter recording 28.91 but in round two Tony Meek's Ringa Hustle was beaten by younger kennelmate Lassa Java. In the third round Lassa Java won in a fast 28.64 and I'm His recorded 28.72. The quarter-finals set up a repeat meeting between Ringa Hustle and Lassa Java and this time Ringa Hustle came out the winner but Greenane Squire set the fastest time of the competition so far in another quarter when beating Pall Mall Stakes champion Sullane Castle by over six lengths in 28.50 sec.

The semi-finals drew both Tony Meek greyhounds against each other yet again but this time Ringa Hustle won comfortably in 28.67. In the second semi Greenane Squire recorded 28.82 from Sullane Castle and Ceader Mountain; favourite I'm His went out.

By virtue of his latest two wins Greenane Squire was to be sent off 15-8 favourite in the final but it was the first time that he was to meet Ringa Hustle during the competition. Ringa Hustle broke well from trap three and led all of the way. Greenane Squire was impeded slightly at the first bend with Sullane Castle and could not get on terms with Ringa Hustle. Sullane Castle ran on strongly to take the runners up spot.

== Final result ==
At Wimbledon (over 480 metres):

Position	Name of Greyhound	Breeding	Trap	SP	Time	Trainer
1st	Ringa Hustle	Midnight Hustle - Ring U Back	3	5-2	28.62	Tony Meek (Oxford)
2nd	Sullane Castle	Tapwatcher - Airhill Foam	1	7-1	28.80	Nigel Saunders (Belle Vue)
3rd	Hypnotic Stag	Greenpark Fox - Sister Moonshine	4	7-2	28.96	John Coleman (Walthamstow)
4th	Greenane Squire	Manorville Major - Endless Game	2	15-8f	28.99	Ernie Gaskin Sr. (Walthamstow)
5th	Lassa Java	Lassana Champ - Fawn Java	5	7-2	29.02	Tony Meek (Oxford)
6th	Ceader Mountain	Greenpark Fox - Kelanig Kwik	6	50-1	29.08	Ken Shearman (Private)

=== Distances ===
2¼, 2, neck, neck, ¾ (lengths)
The distances between the greyhounds are in finishing order and shown in lengths. One length is equal to 0.08 of one second.

== Semi finals ==
First Semi Final (Jun 19)
Pos	Name of Greyhound	SP	Time	Trainer
1st	Ringa Hustle	7-2	28.67	Meek
2nd	Lassa Java	5-2f	29.02	Meek
3rd	Hypnotic Stag	7-2	29.06	Coleman
4th	Lyons Double	10-1	29.17	Pickett
5th	Dromin Fox	11-2	29.23	Garland
6th	Bangor Mick	6-1	29.50	

Second Semi Final (Jun 19)
Pos	Name of Greyhound	SP	Time	Trainer
1st	Greenane Squire	7-4	28.82	Gaskin
2nd	Sullane Castle	3-1	29.07	Saunders
3rd	Ceader Mountain	20-1	29.25	Shearman
4th	Noir Banjo	10-1	29.27	Wileman
5th	I'm His	1-1f	29.45	Jordan
	vacant trap			

== See also ==
- 1993 UK & Ireland Greyhound Racing Year
