= Pall Mall Stakes =

UK greyhound racing Competition

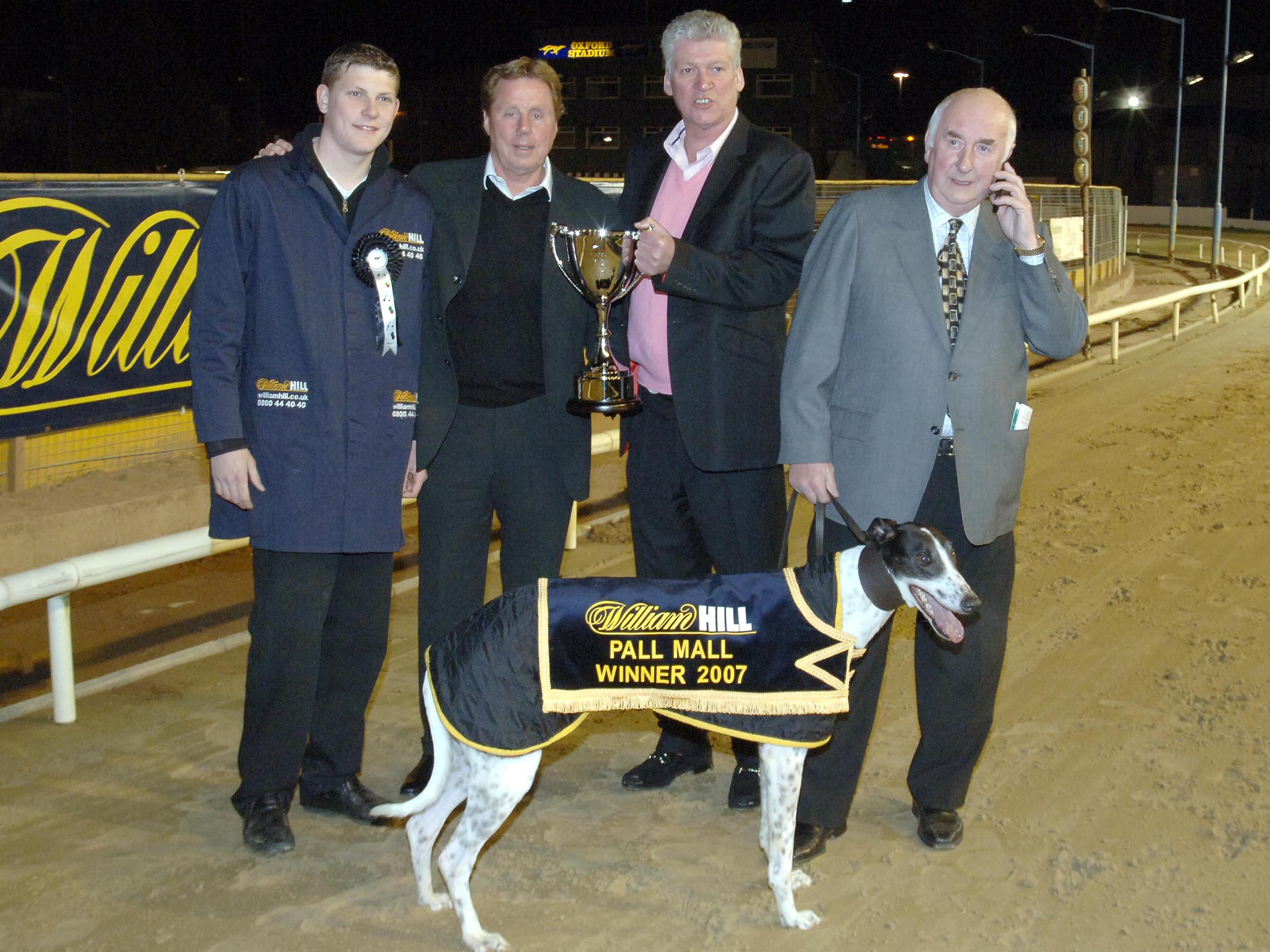
- 2007 winner Ballymac Charley with owner Harry Redknapp and trainer Charlie Lister
- Class: Category 1
- Location: Oxford Stadium
- Inaugurated: 1935
- Sponsor: BetGoodwin

Race information
- Purse: £10,000 (winner)

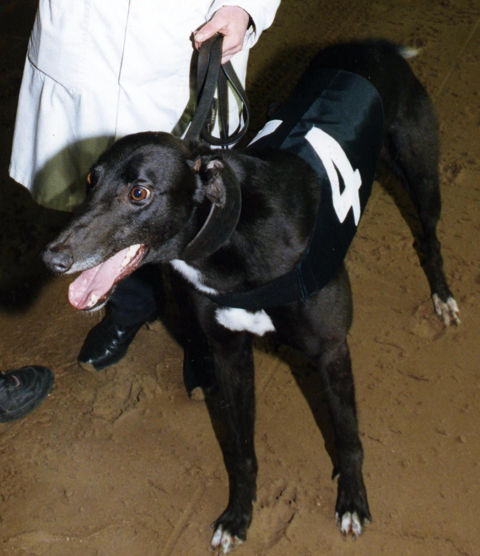
Night Trooper in 1997

The Pall Mall Stakes is a greyhound racing competition held at Oxford Stadium. The event is classified as a category one race.

== History ==
The competition was run at Harringay Stadium from 1935 until 1987 and was originally regarded as the Winter Derby. The event moved to Oxford Stadium in 1988.

At Oxford from 1988 until its closure in 2012, it was held during the month of March and was considered to be a good guide for the upcoming English Greyhound Derby because it attracted many Derby prospects. However, in 2023 the event returned following the re-opening of the stadium.

== Track and race distances ==
- 1935–1974 Harringay Stadium 525 yards
- 1935–1987 Harringay Stadium 475 metres
- 1988–2025 Oxford Stadium 450 metres

== Sponsors ==
- 1988–1988 (No sponsor)+
- 1989–1990 (Northern Sports)
- 1991–1993 (Max Thomas Bookmakers)
- 1994–1994 (Arthur Young Bookmakers)
- 1995–1995 (Tetley Bitter)
- 1996–2001 (Arthur Young Bookmakers)
- 2002–2009 (William Hill)
- 2010–2010 (Stan James)
- 2011–2011 (Betfair)
- 2023–2023 (Stadium Bookmakers)
- 2024–2025 (BetGoodwin)

+original sponsors Denver Racing defaulted on payment

== Past winners ==
Year	Winner	Breeding	Trainer	Time (sec)	SP	Notes/ref
1935	Shove Halfpenny	Town Treasure - Princess Karl	Charlie Ashley (Stamford Bridge)	30.97	7/4f	
1936	Safe Rock	Danielli- ABC	Fred Wilson (Rochester)	31.01	1/1f	
1937	Golden Safeguard	Red Robin - Ellen	Jack Harvey (Harringay)	30.22	7/2	
1938	Roseside Creamery	Creamery Border - Deemsters Olive	Joe Harmon (Stamford Bridge)	30.43	4/5f	
1945	Shannon Shore	Well Squared - Second Row	Leslie Reynolds (Wembley)	29.80	7/2	
1946	Dante II	Well Squared - Olives Idol	Wilf France (Harringay)	30.36	11/2	
1947	Mondays News	Well Squared – Monday Next	Sidney Orton (Wimbledon)	30.10	4/6f	
1948	Night Breeze	Well Squared – Charity Maid	Stan Biss (Clapton)	30.03	100/30	
1949	Drumgoon Boy	Brainy Fellow – Merry Pearl	Frank Davis (Private)	29.71	1/1f	
1950	Ballycurren Garrett	Ballycurren Duke –Ballymakeera Keeper	Jack Harvey (Wembley)	30.02	7/4	
1951	Westbourne	Mad Tanist - Wetherell	Norman Merchant (Private)	29.97	10/1	
1952	Marsh Harrier	Mad Tanist – Misty	William Mills (Private)	29.82	11/10f	
1953	Home Luck	Trevs Cutter – Queens Wood	Stan Martin (Wimbledon)	29.49	5/1	
1954	Rushton Mac	Rushton News – Rushton Panda	Frank Johnson (Private)	30.24	1/1f	
1955	Duet Leader	Champion Prince – Derryluskin Lady	Tommy 'Paddy' Reilly (Walthamstow)	29.42	8/13f	
1956	Silent Worship	The Grand Champion – Miss Chancer	Johnny Bassett (Monmore)	29.42	5/1	
1957	Clara Prince	The Grand Champion – Quare Princess	Paddy McEvoy (Clapton)	29.44	6/5f	
1958	Pigalle Wonder	Champion Prince – Prairie Peg	Jim Syder Jr. (Wembley)	29.03	11/10f	Track record
1959	Mile Bush Pride	The Grand Champion – Witching Dancer	Jack Harvey (Wembley)	29.26	1/5f	
1960	Clonalvy Pride	Solar Prince - Asmena	Jack Harvey (Wembley)	30.18	100/30	
1961	Jockeys Glen	Knock Hill Chieftain – Just Peggy	Frank Sanderson (Private)	29.15	6/4	
1962	Hurry On King	Northern King – Orions Colleen Bawn	Tom Johnston Sr. (West Ham)	29.67	5/2	
1963	Cahara Rover	Paddle First – Cabara Lass	Joe De Mulder (Private)	29.74	6/4f	
1964	Poor Linda	Hi There – Kilcomney Queen	George Waterman (Wimbledon)	29.70	5/2	
1965	Clonmannon Flash	Prairie Flash – Dainty Sister	Jim Hookway (Owlerton)	29.41	2/5f	
1966	Dusty Trail	Printers Present - Dolores Daughter	Paddy Milligan (Private)	29.40	2/5f	
1967	Castle Fame	Prairie Flash - Here She Comes	Joe Pickering (White City)	29.48	6/1	
1968	Local Motive	Shanes Legacy - Mistaken Minnie	Jack Kinsley (Wembley)	28.86	15/2	
1969	Bread Soda	Shanes Legacy - Like It	Willie Wilson (Owlerton)	28.80	20/1	
1970	Moordyke Spot	Newdown Heather - Nelsons Farewell	Stan Martin (Wimbledon)	28.74	4/6f	
1971	Camira Story	Sallys Story - Why Wonder	Adam Jackson (Clapton)	28.88	5/1	
1972	Forest Nobe	Prince Of Roses - Forest Brown	Paddy McEvoy (Wimbledon)	28.85	16/1	
1973	Carrig Shane	Shane's Legacy - Carrigane Lassie	John Lancashire (Private)	28.57	1/1f	
1974	Blackwater Champ	Monalee Champion - Athnid	Peter Payne (Private)	28.53	7/1	
1975	My Dowry	Handy Valley - Black Highbird	Pam Heasman (Private)	29.11	4/1	
1976	Gin And Jass	Kilbeg Kuda - Liberty Bell	Dave Drinkwater (Rye House)	28.81	3/1	
1977	Greenfield Fox	Burgess Heather - Skipping Chick	Ted Dickson (Slough)	28.71	11/4	
1978	Ballinderry Moth	Kilbelin Style - Skipping Chick	Barney O'Connor (Walthamstow)	28.80	100/30	
1979	Sampsons Pal	Blessington Boy - Jacquelines Pal	Pat Mullins (Private)	28.91	7/2	
1980	Lift Coming	Sunvalley Star - Brilliant Mind	Dick Hawkes (Walthamstow)	28.94	3/1jf	
1981	Creamery Pat	Monalee Hiker - Young Speech	Ron Chamberlain (Private)	28.62	7/1	
1982	Sugarville Pat	Cairnville Jet – Santas Sugar	John Honeysett (Crayford)	28.58	8/1	
1983	Yankee Express	Pecos Jerry - Kings Comet	George Curtis (Hove)	28.55	4/5f	
1984	Game Ball	Sand Man - Stay In Business	Jerry Fisher (Reading)	28.23	11/10f	
1985	Hong Kong Mike	Knockrour Slave - Amalthea	Ray Andrews (Belle Vue)	28.35	11/10f	
1986	Tico	The Stranger - Derry Linda	Arthur Hitch (Slough)	28.45	7/4f	
1987	Forest Fawn	Special Account - Mauramitch	Bert Hill (Private)	29.06	7/1	
1988	Fearless Ace	Mt Keeffe Star – Sarahs Bunny	Geoff De Mulder (Norton Canes)	26.96	5/4f	
1989	Fearless Ace	Mt Keeffe Star – Sarahs Bunny	Theo Mentzis (Milton Keynes)	26.80	4/1	Track record
1990	Noelles Turbo	Whisper Wishes – Kyber	Peter Rich (Ramsgate)	27.15	7/2	
1991	Clonlusk Villa	Storm Villa – Clonlusk Dell	Hazel Dickson (Wembley)	27.19	11/4	
1992	Deanpark Atom	Satharn Beo – Nice Class	Tony Meek (Oxford)	27.27	5/1	
1993	Sullane Castle	Tapwatcher – Airhill Foam	Nigel Saunders (Belle Vue)	27.13	4/9f	
1994	Lassa Java	Lassana Champ – Fawn Java	Tony Meek (Hall Green)	27.17	5/2	
1995	Longvalley Manor	I'm Slippy – Long Valley Lady	John Coleman (Walthamstow)	27.36	6/1	
1996	Highview Pet	Whisper Wishes – Ballyfolion Life	Linda Mullins (Walthamstow)	27.21	3/1	
1997	Night Trooper	Portrun Flier – Suir Orla	Nikki Adams (Rye House)	27.19	11/10f	
1998	Black Buster	Joyful Tidings – Little Champagne	Ivan Williams (Perry Barr)	26.70 sec	11/2	
1999	Leitrim Charm	Lyons Dean – Charming Maid	Brian Clemenson (Hove)	26.94	8/1	
2000	El Boss	Pepes Dilemma – Bid You Joy	Linda Mullins (Walthamstow)	26.87	4/1	
2001	Kinda Magic	Deep Decision – Enchantment	Linda Jones (Walthamstow)	27.06	5/1	
2002	Windgap Java	Lassa Java – Dysart Turnover	Cheryl Miller (Sittingbourne)	27.03	4/1	
2003	Cooly Cheetah	Staplers Jo – Kiln Heather	Brian Clemenson (Hove)	27.09	5/1	
2004	Tims Crow	Lenson Lad – Churchtown Spice	Peter Rich (Romford)	26.90	1/1f	
2005	Lisnafulla Flash	Larkhill Jo – Appletown Katie	Ernie Gaskin Sr. (Walthamstow)	26.63	2/1f	
2006	Seomra Rock	Trade Official – Seomra Cheeky	Ernest Gaskin Jr. (Private)	27.14	7/2	
2007	Ballymac Charley	Daves Mentor – Ballymac Bargain	Charlie Lister (Private)	26.75	3/1	
2008	Spears Tarquynn	Fortune Mike – Lyreen Diva	Claude Gardiner (Hove)	26.52	9/4jf	
2009	Drink Up Zorro	Galipip Trooper – Hows Tings	Paul Sallis (Hall Green)	27.18	2/1f	
2010	Ballymac Ace	Ace Hi Rumble – Ballymac Mir	Chris Allsopp (Monmore)	26.38	3/1cf	
2011	Brittons Empire	Hades Rocket – Velvet Satin	Chris Allsopp (Monmore)	26.91	6/1	
2012	You Mind Me	Bit Chili – Miss Shauna	Frank Taylor (Private)	26.89	3/1jf	
2023	Links Maverick	Grangeview Ten – Havana Lottie	Tom Heilbron (Newcastle)	26.76	8/11f	new track layout
2024	Aero Sacundai	Ballymac Cashout – Beaming Smasher	Richie Taberner (Monmore Green)	26.52	5/4f	
2025	Gingers Prince	Ballymac Cashout – Mystical Luna	Patrick Browne (Brighton)	26.43	7/1	

== Gallery ==
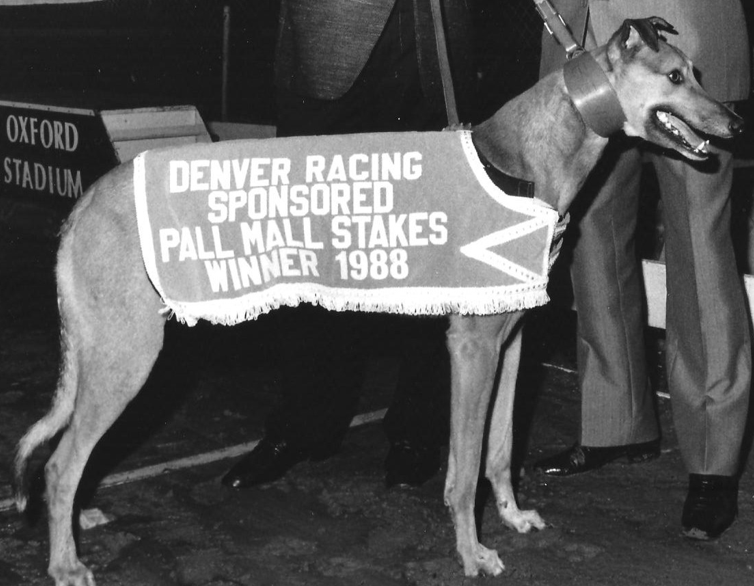
Fearless Ace, double Pall Mall winner

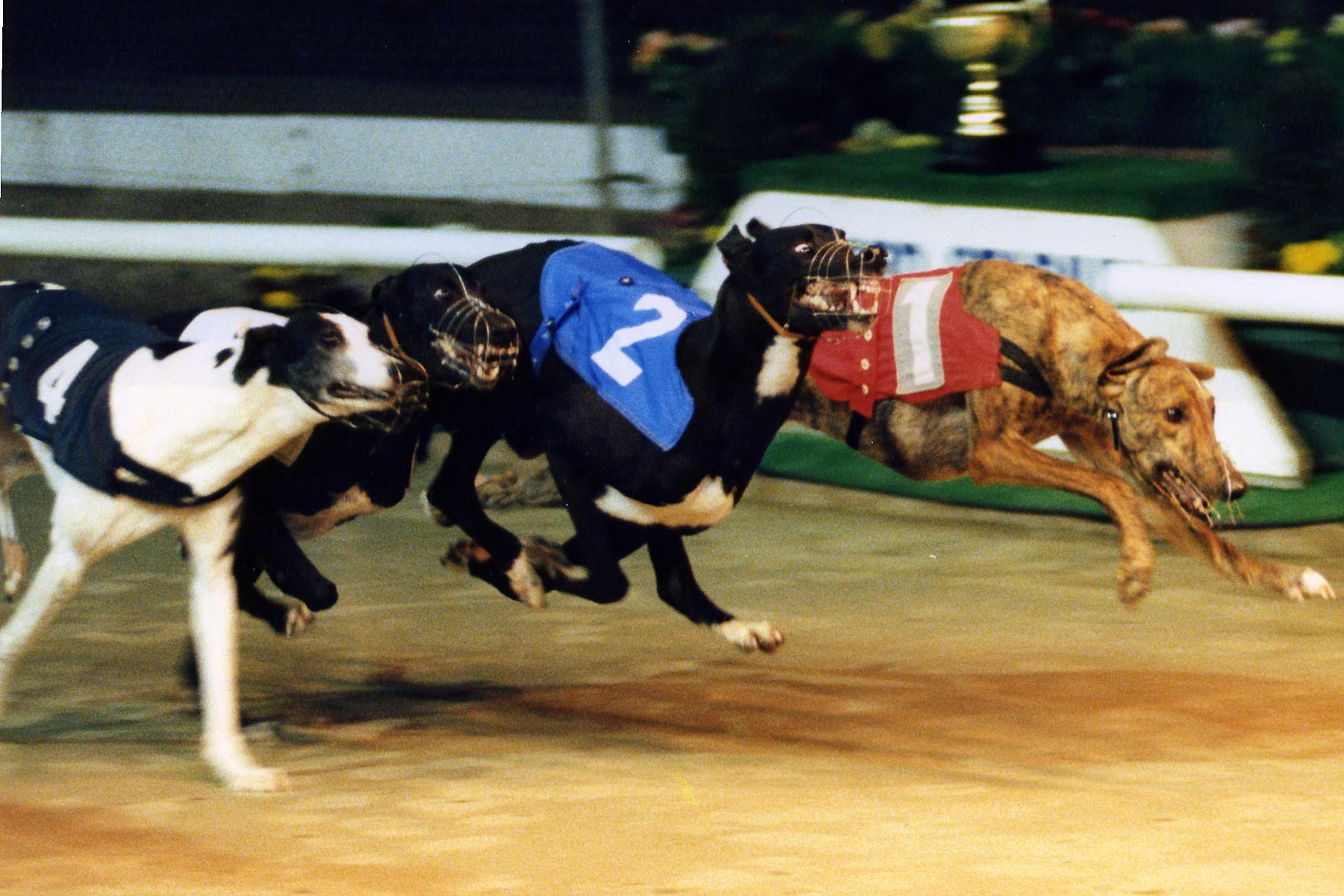
Black Buster blue jacket 1998

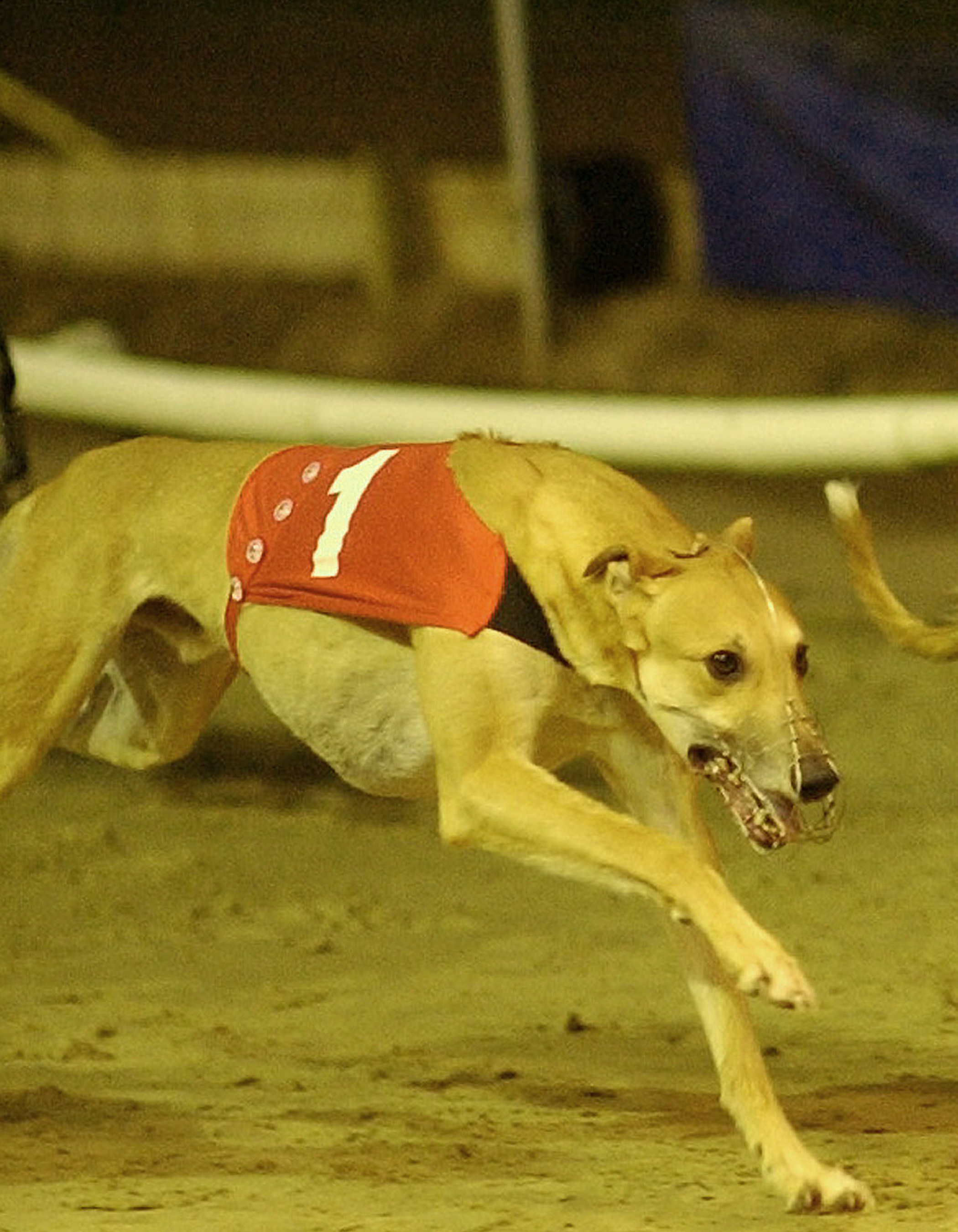
Windgap Java 2002 winner

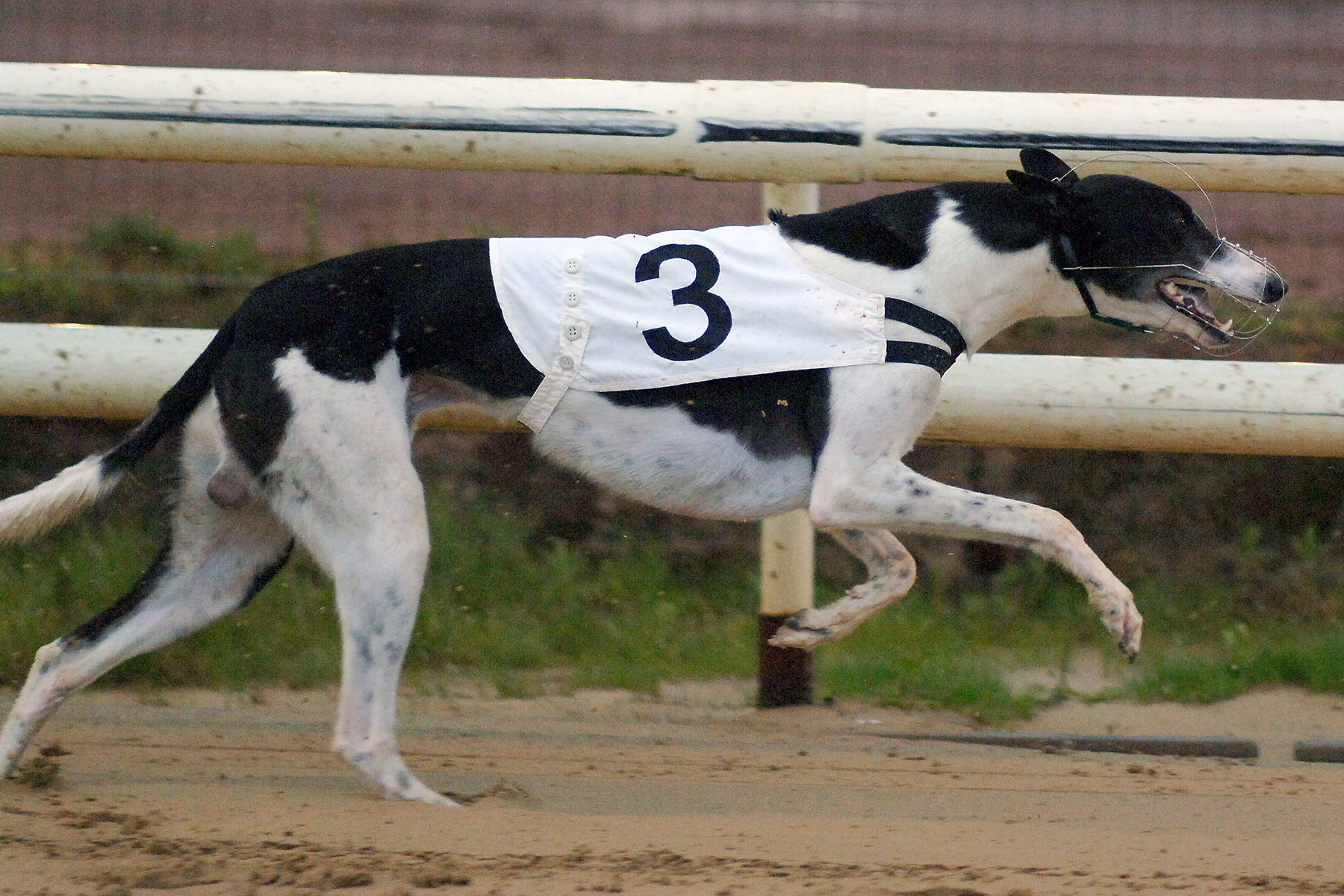
You Mind Me 2012 winner
