= John Coleman (greyhound trainer) =

Irish born former professional greyhound trainer

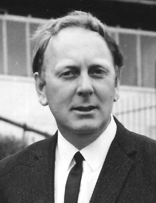

Personal information
- Born: 1935 (age 89–90)
- Occupation: Greyhound trainer

Sport
- Sport: Greyhound racing

Achievements and titles
- National finals: Classic/Feature wins: St Leger (1984); Laurels (1974); Scurry Gold Cup (1969); Gold Collar (1978, 1995); Grand National (1977); Pall Mall Stakes (1995); Trainers Championship (1994, 1995)

John Joseph Coleman (born 1935) is an Irish born former greyhound trainer. He was twice British champion trainer in 1974 and 1995 and was chairman of the Professional Trainers' Association for over 25 years.

== Career ==
Coleman came to Britain from Cork in 1959 and started working in offices at Millwall Dock for the flour millers McDougalls. Soon afterwards, he began his career in UK greyhound racing when he started working for John Bassett at Clapton Stadium. He then secured the lease of the Chantilly Kennels owned by Jimmy Clubb and took out a private trainers licence in May 1966.

He was appointed as a contracted trainer to Romford Greyhound Stadium in 1968 and established a strong kennel of greyhounds and owners. His first big race success was Ace of Trumps who won the 1969 Scurry Gold Cup. In 1972 he switched from Romford to Wembley, taking the place of Jack Harvey who had retired. Coleman became Champion Trainer in 1974. In 1982, he reached the final of the 1982 English Greyhound Derby for the first time.

He remained at Wembley until 1989 before taking a position at the leading track Walthamstow. During the same year he finished runner-up in the 1989 English Greyhound Derby.

Further final appearances came in 1993, 1996 and 1998 and in between he was Champion Trainer for the second time in 1995, a year that also saw him secure the Trainers Championship for the second successive year.

In 2008, Walthamstow closed and three years later in 2011, Coleman retired. He was based for most of his career at the Claverhambury Kennels in Waltham Abbey. The one trophy that eluded him was the English Greyhound Derby.

== Awards ==
He is twice winner of the Greyhound Trainer of the Year in 1974 and 1995.
