= Tony Meek =

British greyhound racing professional trainer

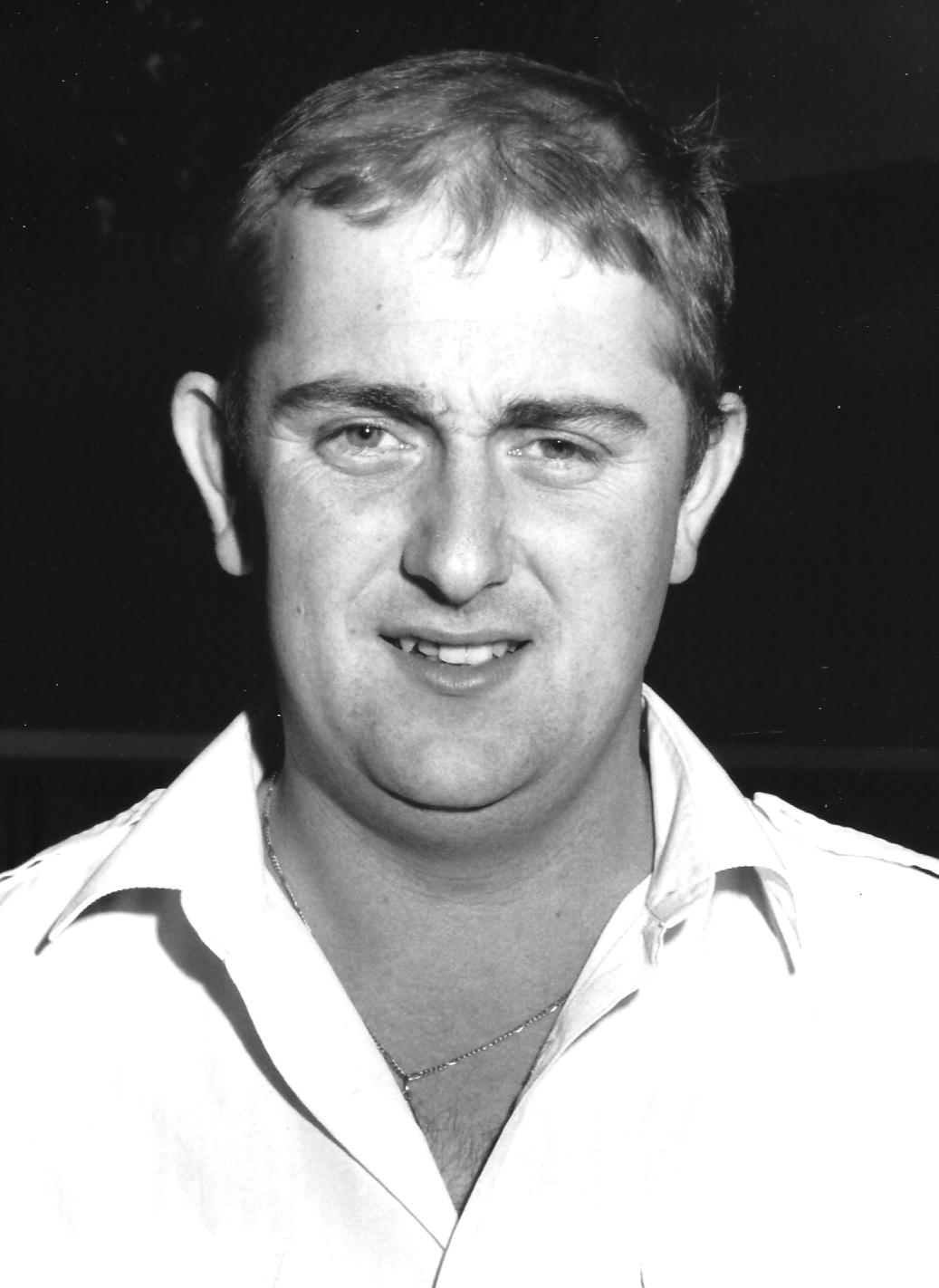
- Tony Meek

Personal information
- Born: 2nd quarter 1961 Gloucester, England
- Occupation: Greyhound trainer

Sport
- Sport: Greyhound racing

Achievements and titles
- National finals: Derby wins: English Derby (1993), (1994); Classic/Feature wins: Pall Mall Stakes (1992, 1994); Puppy Derby (1990, 1993); Reading Masters (1996, 1999); Derby Invitation (1994)

Anthony Charles Meek (born 1961), is a former English greyhound trainer. He is twice an English Greyhound Derby winning trainer.

== Biography ==
Meek born in Gloucester, learnt the trade working for the legendary Geoff De Mulder before moving to Ireland to work with Paddy Keane. He then established his own kennel during the early 1980s, after being granted a professional trainer's licence. The kennels were based in English Bicknor, Gloucestershire and attracted some of the sport's leading owners.

The first significant achievement was making the Grand Prix final with Keem Rocket in 1984. Gino represented Meek in the 1987 Irish Greyhound Derby final before the white and brindle joined John McGee.

He moved his attachment from Abbey Stadium to Oxford Stadium in 1988, which catapulted the kennels to major success. In 1990 he trained Fires of War, who reached the 1990 English Greyhound Derby final. The following year Coalbrook Suzie reached the final of the Oaks and Grand Prix before Deanpark Atom won the Pall Mall Stakes in 1992. He also recorded two Puppy Derby successes with Murlens Support and Lughill Slippy.

The greatest achievements came in 1993 and 1994; first with Ringa Hustle, a black dog with seeding issues but who proved imperious when winning the 1993 English Greyhound Derby, a final in which he was also represented by Lassa Java, who would go on to win the 1994 Pall Mall.

The second achievement in 1994 arrived after Meek switched from Oxford to Hall Green Stadium and crowd favourite Moral Standards completed an unbeaten run through the 1994 English Greyhound Derby. He became only the second trainer to defend a Derby title after Leslie Reynolds.

Tony continued to train and after spells at Monmore and Coventry retired and handed the kennels over to his partner Jayne. He also acted as the Chairman of the Greyhound Trainers Association.
