= Slough Stadium =

Greyhound racing stadium

- Interactive map of Slough Stadium
- Location: Uxbridge Road, Slough, Berkshire
- Coordinates: 51°30′29″N 0°34′46″W

Construction
- Opened: 1928
- Closed: 1987

Slough Stadium originally known as the Dolphin Stadium was a greyhound racing stadium in Uxbridge Road, Slough, Berkshire.

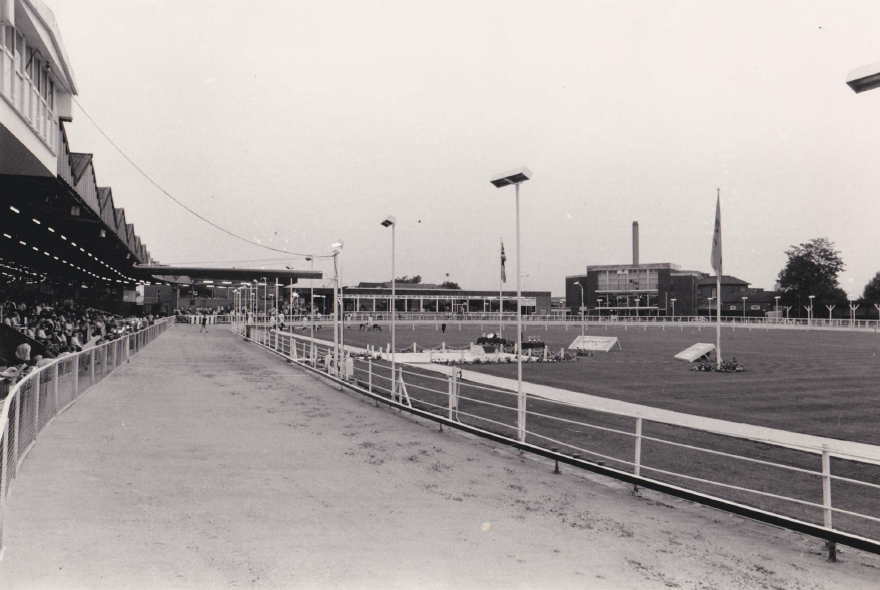
Greyhound racing at Slough Stadium c.1970

== Origins and opening ==
George Bennett Sr. a resident and entrepreneur of Slough bought and sold a cinema in Chalvey before purchasing the Dolphin Hotel in Slough in May 1914. The hotel was next door to the Dolphin ground which had hosted cricket, athletics, bowls and football in the nineteenth century. It had been the venue for the first football match between Berkshire and Buckinghamshire on 30 January 1873 and had been the home ground of the Swifts Football Club in the 1870's and 1880's before becoming the home of the Slough football club from 1889.

Bennett decided that the ground required more activity and after watching the new sport of greyhound racing he made the decision to construct a greyhound track around the pitch. Work got underway in 1928 with the stadium taking shape on the east side of the Uxbridge Road and south of the Dolphin Hotel. The south part of the stadium would reach as far as the houses on Dolphin Road.

The opening night was on 26 May 1928 the first ever race at the track. Training kennels were established at the nearby Homelea Farm in Datchet.

== Pre war history ==
In March 1929, the stadium was given the name the Dolphin Stadium. Also in 1929, a greyhound called Idle Chief won 16 consecutive races and Bennett continued with his enterprises by introducing a training camp for boxers at his Dolphin hotel which included Tommy Farr, Ben Ford, Jack Doyle, Primo Carnera, Marcel Thil and Midget Wogan.

In 1936, Bennett sold the Dolphin Stadium to Clapton Stadium Company Limited who already controlled Clapton, South Shields and Warrington. H.Garland Wells who was joint vice president of the National Greyhound Racing Society and Clapton Stadium Ltd was instrumental in the company’s decision to purchase the track which they renamed Slough Greyhound Stadium. However, it was still known as the Dolphin Stadium when used for boxing and football events.

The track circumference was 400 yards and the course was described as a handy little track with bends that favour railers (greyhounds nearest the inside rail), a good run-up to the first bend means trap draw has little advantage. seeding did not exist which explains why trap draw had little advantage on a track favouring railers.

There was a training establishment at Sunnymeads, Dedworth in Windsor used solely for Slough greyhounds and principal events included the Easter Cup, Whitsun Cup, Yuletide Cup, Home Counties Cup and Coronation Puppy Championship with the addition of a race called the Dolphin Trophy.

== 1946-1960 ==
After the war the Buckinghamshire Cup was introduced and totalisator turnover in 1946 was £1,495,881.

S.T.Lucas was the Racing Manager in the 1950s before handing over to John Collins in 1959, the Director of Racing for Clapton Stadium Ltd was E W Godfrey and he also handed over in 1959 to H J Richardson. E Luper and H Luper then took over as the new Managing Directors of the company.

== 1960s ==
In 1966 the Greyhound Racing Association (GRA) purchased New Clapton Stadiums Ltd, the deal included Slough, Clapton, Reading, two training sites with 180 acres and an interest in West Ham Stadium. Under the GRA the trainers responsible for supplying the greyhounds to Slough were Jimmy Jowett, Bill Krailing, Paddy Pierce, Jim Barker, Ron Jeffrey and Jim Sherry, the latter three also supplied Reading. Racing took place on Tuesday and Saturday evenings.

== 1970s ==
The hare system was an 'Inside Sumner' and amenities included a steak bar, two buffet bars and four licensed bars. In 1971 Slough and Reading changed to the contract trainer system, a policy that many stadia had adopted and three years later in 1974 sister track Clapton closed resulting in the prestigious Classic the Scurry Gold Cup being transferred to Slough.

The 1977 running of the Scurry ended with a three-way battle between two promising newcomers Wired To Moon and Cahurmore Speech and defending champion Xmas Holiday. Cahurmore Speech broke the Slough track record in the semi-finals before finishing runner up to Wired To Moon in the final with Xmas Holiday finishing third. On the way back to the Northaw kennels after the race Adam Jackson's finalist Fiano was killed in a vehicle accident.

Trainer Ted Dickson won the first Classic race for the track after Greenfield Fox won the 1977 Laurels before winning the Pall Mall Stakes. Dickson also trained a fawn dog called Linacre who had four big wins in 1977, the Derby Consolation, Edinburgh Cup, Sussex Cup and Wembley Spring Cup. Dickson was rewarded by being named the Greyhound Trainer of the Year.

== 1980s ==
Yankee Express secured a hat-trick of Scurry titles in the early 1980s before Slough won the English Greyhound Derby with one of their greyhounds called Tico (trained by Arthur Hitch) in 1986.

== Closure ==
In 1987 Slough became the fourth and last track of the 1966 deal to be sold by the GRA to developers. It closed on 21 March 1987 with the last race being won by Ted Dickson's Yellow Crest.

The Scurry Gold Cup moved to Catford and the original Sunnymeads kennels are still used today but the stadium site is a Sainsbury's supermarket.

== Competitions ==
=== Buckinghamshire Cup ===
Year	Winner	Trainer	Time	SP
1946	Glin Lad	Paddy Fortune (Wimbledon)	27.03	4-6f
1947	Lightfooted Lad	N Lloyd (Private)	27.06	11-10f
1948	Gatabawn	Paddy McEllistrim (Wimbledon)	27.50	100-8
1949	Captured Dick	Jack Harvey (Wembley)	26.95	5-2f
1950	Flamenco	William Mills (Private)	27.21	6-1
1952	Wombourne Ted	William Mills (Private)	39.66	100-6
1953	Parkroe Bob (dead-heat)	Jack Young (Oxford)	26.94	11-4
1953	Romantic Crisis (dead-heat)	Paddy McEvoy (Private)	26.94	5-2
1955	Tax Diablo	Leslie Reynolds (Wembley)	26.78	4-6f
1956	Little Paddys Choice	Jimmy Jowett (Clapton)	27.40	8-1
1957	Girlies Champ	Jimmy Jowett (Clapton)	27.61	5-2
1958	The Gifts Champion	Alf Forman (Park Royal)	26.98	
1959	Corvette	Bill Gigg (Private)	26.83	9-2
1960	Cassagh Monarch	Reg Webb (Private)	26.02	4-1
1961	Angel Touch	Jimmy Jowett (Clapton)	37.61	
1962	Devilabetter	Reg Webb (Private)	37.71	
1963	Buckwheat	Reg Webb -(Private)	37.17	
1964	Ivy Hall King	Paddy Keane (Clapton)	37.15	1-2f
1965	Luck Arrow II	Peter Collett (Private)	37.28	
1966	Woodlawn	Barney O'Connor (Walthamstow)	37.10	
1967	Loughnore Guest	Jimmy Jowett (Clapton)	37.28	
1968	Dicks Dilemma	Gordon Hodson (White City)	37.72	
1969	Jeannies Wonder	John Perrin (Private)	37.00	6-4f
1970	Albany Grand	Wally Ginzel (Private)	36.99	9-4
1971	Coset Fire		36.53	
1972	Adamstown Fire	Peter Hawkesley (Harringay)	36.37	11-4
1973	Ashgrove Tric		37.06	
1974	Delroney Leader		37.14	
1975	Houghton Girl	Barbara Tompkins (Watford)	37.28	
1976	Thade Is Out	Vernon Ford (Private)	38.49	7-1
1977	Black Legend	Ted Dickson (Slough)	37.87	4-6f
1978	Owners Guide	Tony Jowett (Slough)	37.57	
1979	Full Again		37.33	
1980	Rikasso Pancho		30.51	
1981	Westmead Seal	Natalie Savva (Private)	39.95	4-1
1982	Self Raising	C Buzzard (Private)	39.29	12-1
1986	Mineola Athena	Arthur Hitch (Slough)	39.27	8-1

== Track records ==
Pre-metric

Distance yards	Greyhound	Time	Date	Notes
275	Oola Rattler	15.51	1946	
460	Sallys Chat	25.70	07.11.1961	
460	Shamrock Clipper	25.62	17.05.1966	
460	Tipper	25.60	05.1969	
475	Parish Model	26.71	1947	
640	Jeannies Wonder	36.63	1970	
650	Lucky Arrow II	36.92	07.09.1965	
650	Lielow		29.03.1966	
650	Quails Glory	36.42	08.09.1970	
675	Diamond Jim	39.42	1946	
860	Miss Elegant	49.66	16.07.1963	
860	Hiver Whitenose	49.58	1970	
880	Boreen Brandy		22.03.1966	
880	Gladness	50.97	05.03.1968	
460 H	Rorys Pleasure	26.57	21.03.1961	
475 H	Cadet Captain	27.69	1946	

Post-metric

Distance metres	Greyhound	Time	Date	Notes
442	Northwood Double	26.74	1978	
442	Rodeen Jet	26.62	19.06.1985	
442	Cahurmore Speech		1977	Scurry Gold Cup Semi-finals
593	Owners Guide	37.20	1979	
807	Westpark Putter	52.13	1978	
