= Linda Mullins =

British greyhound trainer (1939–2026)

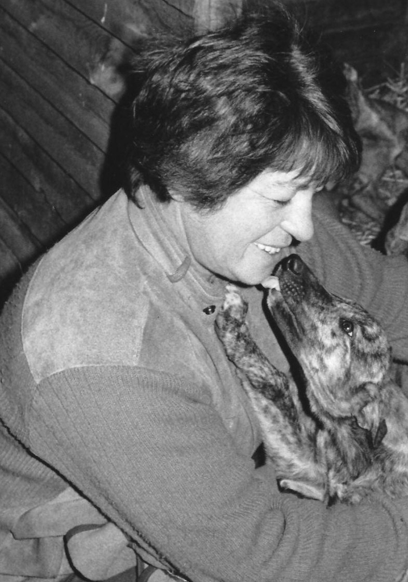

Personal information
- Born: 25 July 1939 Milton, Kent, England
- Died: 25 May 2026 (aged 86)
- Occupation: Greyhound trainer

Sport
- Sport: Greyhound racing

Achievements and titles
- National finals: Classic/Feature wins: Greyhound Trainer of the Year (1996, 1997, 1998, 1999, 2000); Trainers Championship (1991, 1993, 1997); Laurels (1984, 1996, 1997); Grand National (1990, 1998, 1999); Pall Mall (1985, 1998, 2002); Grand Prix (1997, 1999, 2000); St Leger (2000); Cesarewitch (2003); TV Trophy (1993); Scurry Gold Cup (2000)

Linda Mullins (25 July 1939 – 25 May 2026) was an English greyhound trainer. She was a five-time champion trainer of Great Britain and was regarded as the leading trainer during the 1990s.

== Biography ==
Mullins (née Chapelle) trained greyhounds at Eastbach kennels in English Bicknor and then married Pat Mullins in 1980. They ran the greyhound business from kennels in Manningtree, Essex and had four sons; three of which (John, David and Kelly) became trainers in their own right at later dates. The family won the 1978 English Greyhound Derby with Lacca Champion.

Pat died in March 1981, which resulted in Linda taking over the kennels. Her sister Jeanne Chapelle was a successful trainer at Oxford Stadium with the JC prefix in the 1960s. In April 1981, Linda received the sport's leading award for breeding the top litter, which included 1980 greyhound of the year Sport Promoter.

She started as a kennel girl at Wembley and then as a trainer initially raced out of Cambridge Stadium in 1982 before spells at Harringay Stadium and Crayford Stadium. The first Classic race success arrived in 1984 by virtue of a Laurels title with a greyhound called Amenhotep. Linda continued to gain success and switched tracks to Romford Stadium in 1987.

Mullins secured the first of three Grand National titles in 1990 and her son David took out a licence at Sunderland in 1991 before Linda gained a contract at Walthamstow Stadium. She secured five consecutive Champion Trainer titles from 1996-2000.

A first English Greyhound Derby final appearance in 1995 was quickly followed by numerous classics with the help of greyhounds such as El Tenor and Palace Issue. In 1999, Linda's Hello Buttons dead heated with Pottos Storm trained by her son David in the final of the Grand National. In 2000, Linda retired. Her son, John, took over the licence.

Mullins died on 25 May 2026, aged 86.

== Awards ==
Mullins won the Greyhound Trainer of the Year for five consecutive years from 1996 to 2000 and won the Trainers Championship three times in 1991, 1993 and 1997 respectively.
