= Greyhound trainer =

Profession

A greyhound trainer is a person who trains greyhounds for racing. This involves exercising, feeding, and grooming them, in addition to keeping the greyhound in race condition to enable the greyhound to race to the best of its ability.

== History ==
Before the 1930s, nearly all greyhound racing was in the form of coursing, ⁣⁣but track racing was established in the United States in 1919 and in Great Britain in 1927. Today, the term 'greyhound trainer' refers mainly to track racing, because coursing has been banned in many countries.

== United Kingdom ==
In the United Kingdom Greyhound trainers currently fall under two sectors: those registered by the Greyhound Board of Great Britain (GBGB), and a sector known as 'independent racing' or 'flapping', which is racing unaffiliated to any governing body. In Ireland, trainers are regulated by the Greyhound Racing Ireland.

== Role ==
In greyhound racing, a trainer prepares a greyhound for races, with responsibility for exercising it, feeding it, getting it race-ready, and determining which races it should enter. In the majority of cases, they train the greyhound for an owner and look after the greyhound 24/7 at their race kennels. Greyhound trainers charge the owner a kennel fee for training the greyhound. The prize money goes to the owner.

Greyhound trainers usually act as agents for their owners, including the purchasing of greyhounds from breeders. As such, they have legal obligations to their owners.
