= 1954 UK & Ireland Greyhound Racing Year =

The 1954 UK & Ireland Greyhound Racing Year was the 29th year of greyhound racing in the United Kingdom and the 28th year of greyhound racing in Ireland.

== Roll of honour ==
Major Winners
Award	Name of Winner
1954 English Greyhound Derby	Pauls Fun
1954 Irish Greyhound Derby	Spanish Battleship
1954 Scottish Greyhound Derby	Rushton Mac
1954 Welsh Greyhound Derby	Not held
Greyhound of the Year	Pauls Fun & Pancho Villa

== Summary ==
Spanish Battleship secured a second consecutive Irish Greyhound Derby title becoming the first greyhound in history to do so. In addition to the Derby win, during the year he won the Tostal Cup at Harold's Cross Stadium and Easter Cup at Shelbourne Park before an injury curtailed his efforts in the Callanan Cup final. After his historic Derby win he would win the Tipperary Cup with two track record runs and a victory in the McCalmont Cup but would be a shock loser in the final of the McAlinden Cup for the second year running. Pauls Fun won the English Greyhound Derby for Leslie Reynolds securing a record fifth title for the trainer.

The annual totalisator was £56,139,001.

== Competitions ==
Prince Lawrence and Ardskeagh Ville claimed the pre-derby classics, the Grand National and Gold Collar respectively. Jack Harvey went on a significant three classic winning run; his Gold Collar finalist Demon King captured the sprinters classic the Scurry Gold Cup. The following month during the Laurels, at Wimbledon Stadium Coolkill Chieftain picked up the £1,000 first prize and then in September his Laurels runner up Pancho Villa secured a four and half-length victory in the St Leger final. In addition he also won the Puppy Derby with Gulf of Darien.

The Scottish Greyhound Derby moved to October in an attempt to gain more entries and this seemed to work when the competition received a good entry, including a pair of brothers who emerged to dominate the event. Rushton Mac (by Rushton News out of Rushton Panda) defeated his brother Rushton Spot, who was eliminated from the English Derby at the semi-final stage. Rushton Mac had previously won the Edinburgh Cup. The kennel brothers were trained by Frank Johnson and Rushton Mac won the Pall Mall Stakes and Select Stakes titles.

West Ham Stadium received a star studded line up for the Cesarewitch final in October. Matchlock beat a field in the final by seven lengths that included Derby champion Pauls Fun, St Leger champion Pancho Villa, Title Role and Barrowside. The last major event of the year was the Grand Prix and the Rushton brothers took the first two places again, only this time in a reversal of the Scottish Derby final.

Kensington Perfection trained by Bill Higgins at Oxford Stadium completed an impressive four timer by winning four National Produce stakes finals at Stamford Bridge, Catford Stadium, Brighton & Hove Greyhound Stadium (The Regency) and Eastville Stadium.

== Tracks ==
A new track in Weymouth opened during August; the site was on Radpole Lane and was known as the Wessex Stadium and Somercotes opened the following month. Stanley Greyhound Stadium withdrew from the National Greyhound Racing Club under the 'Combine' licence.

== Principal UK races ==
Grand National, White City (May 8 525y h, £300)
Pos	Name of Greyhound	Trainer	SP	Time	Trap
1st	Prince Lawrence	Joe Pickering	10-1	30.29	1
2nd	Brighton Master	Sidney Orton	10-1	30.53	2
3rd	Ruddy Caution	Paddy McEvoy	7-2	30.71	5
4th	Tanist Farewell		3-1	30.89	3
5th	Parkroe Bob	Jack Young	6-1	31.01	4
6th	The Flying Kingdom	A.W.Way	2-1f	31.09	6

Gold Collar, Catford (May 29, 440y, £450)
Pos	Name of Greyhound	Trainer	SP	Time	Trap
1st	Ardskeagh Ville	Dave Barker	9-4	25.86	5
2nd	Rathroe Surprise	Bob Burls	10-1	26.10	3
3rd	Demon King	Jack Harvey	100-7	26.20	2
4th	More Majors		33-1	26.36	1
5th	Safe Keys	Miss Mary Vaughan	8-1	27.00	4
6th	Home Luck	Stan Martin	1-1f	00.00	6

Scurry Gold Cup, Clapton (Jul 24, 400y £600)
Pos	Name of Greyhound	Trainer	SP	Time	Trap
1st	Demon King	Jack Harvey	4-9f	22.84	1
2nd	Annaghneal	Jim Syder Jr.	7-1	23.00	3
3rd	Hertzog	Dave Geggus	100-8	23.18	2
4th	Mystery Rival	Bert Stephens	50-1	23.54	5
5th	Fitzs Marquis	Tom Paddy Reilly	7-1	23.64	4
6th	Explosive Gilbert	Leslie Reynolds	8-1	24.04	6

Laurels, Wimbledon (Aug 20, 500y, £1,000)
Pos	Name of Greyhound	Trainer	SP	Time	Trap
1st	Coolkill Chieftain	Jack Harvey	1-2f	28.05	5
2nd	Pancho Villa	Jack Harvey	11-2	28.49	4
3rd	Christopher Hemley	Sidney Orton	10-1	29.13	6
4th	Ashcott Boy	Leslie Reynolds	10-1	29.17	3
5th	Rathroe Surprise	Bob Burls	20-1	29.41	2
6th	Something Odd	Dave Geggus	15-2	29.53	1

St Leger, Wembley (Sep 13, 700y, £1,000)
Pos	Name of Greyhound	Trainer	SP	Time	Trap
1st	Pancho Villa	Jack Harvey	1-1f	40.99	1
2nd	Matchlock	Ted Brennan	9-2	41.35	2
3rd	Fly Prince	George Crussell	100-8	41.55	5
4th	Blue Bell Crosty		4-1	41.61	4
5th	The Sherpa	Noreen Collin	8-1	41.67	6
N/R	Coolkill Chieftain	Jack Harvey			

Oaks, White City (Oct 2, 525y, £500)
Pos	Name of Greyhound	Trainer	SP	Time	Trap
1st	Ashcott Winsome	Bert Heyes	100-6	29.39	2
2nd	Cree Dusk	Sidney Orton	2-1f	29.49	1
3rd	Velvet Doll	Jack Harvey	5-2	29.53	5
4th	Rimmells Pearl	Jim Hookway	4-1	29.56	6
5th	Gift of Pleasure	Arthur Hancock	6-1	29.72	3
6th	Waltzers Choice	Reg String Marsh	6-1	29.76	4

Scottish Greyhound Derby, Carntyne (Oct 9, 525y, £500)
Pos	Name of Greyhound	Trainer	SP	Time	Trap
1st	Rushton Mac	Frank Johnson	5-2	29.20	2
2nd	Rushton Spot	Frank Johnson	6-1	29.32	5
3rd	Hi There	Jim Brennan	3-1	29.35	4
4th	Prince Chancer	Jimmy Jowett	6-4f	29.47	1
5th	Stolen Seal		50-1	29.79	3
6th	Tillside Beech		33-1	30.19	6

Cesarewitch, West Ham (Oct 15, 600y, £600)
Pos	Name of Greyhound	Trainer	SP	Time	Trap
1st	Matchlock	Ted Brennan	7-2	33.03	6
2nd	Rose of Cooleeney	Wembley	1-2f	33.59	5
3rd	Pauls Fun	Leslie Reynolds	10-1	33.65	1
4th	Pancho Villa	Jack Harvey	10-1	33.69	2
5th	Barrowside	Jack Harvey	25-1	33.83	3
6th	Title Role	Jack Harvey	10-1	33.97	4

The Grand Prix Walthamstow (Oct 13, 525y, £750)
Pos	Name of Greyhound	Trainer	SP	Time	Trap
1st	Rushton Spot	Frank Johnson	10-3	29.57	5
2nd	Rushton Mac	Frank Johnson	5-2	30.09	6
3rd	Cheeky Tony		25-1	30.17	4
4th	Cooleen Surprise	George Crussell	6-1	30.45	3
5th	Step Inside	Ron Chamberlain	7-2	30.47	1
6th	Please Champion	Miss K.G.Sanderson	9-4f	30.63	2

== Totalisator returns ==
Extended content

The totalisator returns declared to the licensing authorities for the year 1954 are listed below. Tracks that did not have a totalisator in operation are not listed.

Stadium	Turnover £
London (White City)	4,367,000
London (Harringay)	2,967,000
London (Wimbledon)	2,464,000
London (Wembley)	2,429,000
London (Walthamstow)	2,298,000
London (Wandsworth)	1,748,000
London (Clapton)	1,681,000
London (Park Royal)	1,641,000
London (West Ham)	1,583,000
London (Stamford Bridge)	1,561,000
Manchester (Belle Vue)	1,558,000
London (Catford)	1,467,000
London (Hackney)	1,231,000
London (New Cross)	1,083,000
London (Hendon)	1,000,000
Manchester (White City)	867,000
London (Charlton)	843,000
Romford	837,000
Brighton & Hove	773,000
Glasgow (Shawfield)	760,000
Birmingham (Perry Barr, old)	747,000
Edinburgh (Powderhall)	721,000
Birmingham (Hall Green)	696,000
Newcastle (Gosforth)	673,000
Manchester (Salford)	652,000
Crayford & Bexleyheath	640,000
Newcastle (Brough Park)	635,000
London (Dagenham)	633,000
Cardiff (Arms Park)	614,000
Birmingham (Kings Heath)	559,000
Wolverhampton (Monmore)	547,000
Sheffield (Owlerton)	544,000
Bradford (Greenfield)	515,000
Gateshead	499,000
Glasgow (White City)	490,000
Leeds (Elland Road)	481,000
Slough	481,000
Southampton	478,000

Stadium	Turnover £
Bristol (Eastville)	477,000
Glasgow (Albion)	466,000
Southend-on-Sea	462,000
Coventry (Lythalls Lane)	440,000
Liverpool (Seaforth)	424,000
Ramsgate (Dumpton Park)	394,000
Middlesbrough	384,000
Willenhall	372,000
Liverpool (White City)	352,000
Blackpool (St Anne's)	349,000
Sheffield (Darnall)	349,000
Glasgow (Carntyne)	348,000
Gloucester & Cheltenham	342,000
Ashington (Co Durham)	333,000
Reading (Oxford Road)	331,000
South Shields	324,000
Leicester (Blackbird Rd)	317,000
Bolton	310,000
Rochester & Chatham	309,000
Chester	294,000
Liverpool (Stanley)	272,000
Hull (Old Craven Park)	261,000
Derby	254,000
Bradford (City)	246,000
Preston	236,000
Nottingham (White City)	231,000
Aberdeen	225,000
Sheffield (Hyde Park)	214,000
West Hartlepool	210,000
Portsmouth	208,000
Plymouth	207,000
Newport	205,000
Oxford	205,000
Sunderland	205,000
Blackburn	203,000
Stanley (Co Durham)	197,000
Warrington	177,000
Stoke-on-Trent (Hanley)	175,483

Stadium	Turnover £
Exeter (County Ground)	166,000
Glasgow (Firhill)	162,000
Norwich (Boundary Park)	1556,000
Luton	154,000
Yarmouth	151,000
Cradley Heath	141,000
Norwich (City)	138,000
Keighley	129,000
Bristol (Knowle)	124,000
Houghton-le-Spring	124,000
Ipswich	118,000
Stoke-on-Trent (Cobridge)	117,000
St Helens	133,000
Rochdale	97,000
Stockton-on-Tees (Belle Vue)	97,000
Rayleigh (Essex)	95,000
Wallyford (East Lothian)	95,000
Peterborough	92,000
Oldham	89,000
Easington (Co Durham)	77,000
Long Eaton	72,000
Swindon	67,000
Stockport (Hazel Grove)	63,000
Wakefield	60,000
Wigan (Poolstock)	54,000
Wigan (Woodhouse)	50,000
Durham City	46,000
Northampton	40,000
Rotherham	35,000
Tamworth	32,000
Doncaster (Spotbrough)	30,000
Coundon (Co Durham)	27,000
Workington	25,000
Spennymoor (Co Durham)	24,000
Aycliffe (Co Durham)	18,000
Irvine (Townhead)	6,000
