= McAlinden Cup =

Former Greyhound racing competition in Ireland

- Location: Shelbourne Park
- Inaugurated: 1939
- Final run: 1976

Race information
- Distance: 525 yards

The McAlinden Cup was a greyhound racing competition held annually at Shelbourne Park in Dublin, Ireland.

The race was also known by the name the Hugh McAlinden Memorial Cup. Hugh McAlinden was the chairman of Belfast Celtic F.C. and one of the founders of greyhound racing in Ireland introducing racing to Celtic Park in Belfast in 1927.

The competition was a feature competition in the Irish racing calendar and was seen as a good test for the Irish Greyhound Derby because it was held over the same race distance and course. The event was inaugurated in 1939. In 1942 it was run at Cork Greyhound Stadium for the only time in its history when it was won by 1942 Irish Greyhound Derby champion Uacterlainn Riac.

In 1944 Robeen Printer recorded 29.90 sec in the heats which was the fastest ever time recorded at Shelbourne Park by a bitch at the time.

The event lost its status as a major race and was replaced by the Champion Stakes.

== Past winners ==
Year	Winner	Time	Trainer
1939	Nore Prince		
1940	Another Dancing Willie	30.47	
1941	Landys Style	30.25	
1942	Uacterlainn Riac	30.34	John Crowley
1943	Mad Printer	30.48	
1944	Robeen Printer	30.17	
1945	Soft Day Matt	30.12	
1946	Lemon Flash	30.13	Tom Lennon
1947	Snowstorm	30.21	
1948	Tadja	30.44	
1949	Prince Palatine	29.85	
1950	Bronze Badge	29.92	
1951	Bronze Badge	30.15	
1952	Glittering Mad	29.98	
1953	Rose of Meath		
1954	Imperial Toast	30.14	
1955	Prince of Bermuda	30.53	
1956	Romantic Slievmanon	29.77	
1957	Mikos Prince		
1959	The Flogging Reel		George Buggy
1960	The Grand Prince		
1962	Annaglaive Star		Madge Fitzpatrick
1963	Oklahoma Kid	30.23	
1964	Granada Chief	29.65	
1965	Nuts	29.46	
1966	Newrath Dancer	29.58	
1967	Rathinch Valley	29.40	Jack Lambert
1968	Philotimo	29.23	
1969	Johnnys Dream	29.35	
1970	Ballyhandy Duke	29.43	
1971	Highland Drive	29.34	Paddy Bergin
1972	Eighthouses	29.70	
1973	Dark Mercury	29.67	
1974	Cyclone	29.99	
1976	Game Parachute	29.55	

== Venues & Distances ==
- 1939-1941 (Shelbourne Park, 525y)
- 1942 (Cork, 525y)
- 1943-1976 (Shelbourne Park, 525y)
