= 1971 Irish Greyhound Derby =

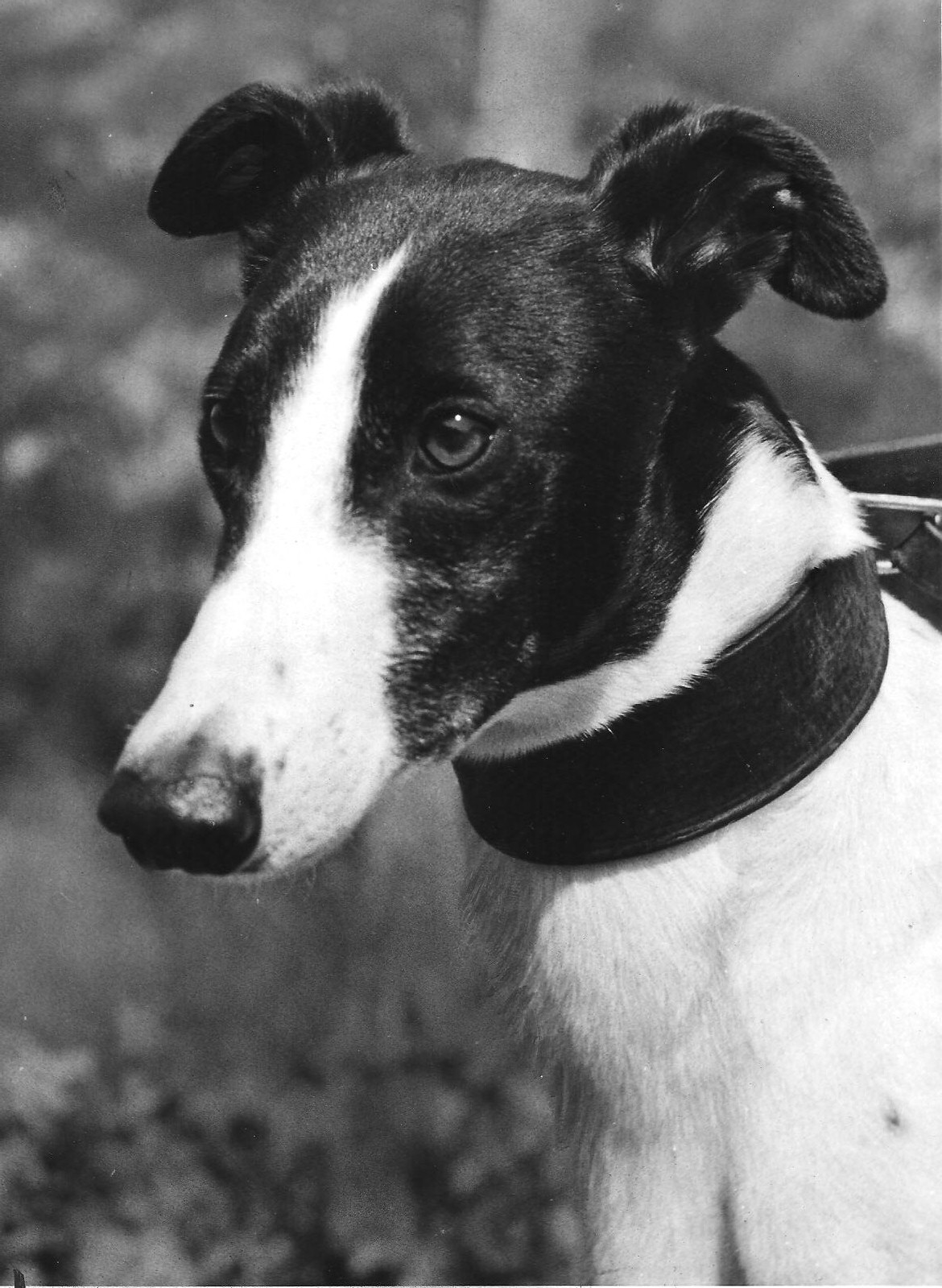
- Sole Aim
- Venue: Shelbourne Park
- Location: Dublin
- End date: 7 August
- Total prize money: £5,000 (winner)

The 1971 Irish Greyhound Derby took place during July and August with the final being held at Shelbourne Park in Dublin on 7 August 1971.

The winner Sole Aim won £5,000 and was trained by Dave Geggus and owned by Mrs Frances Chandler. The competition was sponsored by Carrolls.

== Competition Report ==
The Irish Derby had firmly established itself as a major target for top British hopes as well as the usual Irish challengers helped by the increase in prize money from sponsors Carrolls. The British contingent included 1971 English Greyhound Derby finalist Moordyk Champion and Laurels champion Sole Aim trained by Dave Geggus and on paper would they provide a major challenge. The Irish hopes rested with Ivy Hall Flash the beaten English Derby favourite and finalist, defending champion Monalee Pride, Gay McKenna's Postal Vote, the 1970 Irish greyhound of the year Mark Anthony, and coursing champion Hack up Fenian.

With such a star studded line up, the competition seemed destined for great things and in the very first round Ivy Hall Flash recorded 29.10. Ante-post favourite Postal Vote and Corn Cuchulainn winner Fleur des Lis also won. There was a Ger McKenna double, after both Mr Lir and Hopeful Hope won but there was a big shock as Moordyk Champion failed to qualify.

Heavy rain prevailed during the second round but Ivy Hall Flash impressed again in a time of 29.53. Clerihan Venture won again and Postal Vote qualified finishing second in his heat. Other winners included Duval Prince, Monalee Pride and Butlers Glen.

Before the semi-finals Ivy Hall Flash and Postal Vote were both quoted at short odds of 7–4 to win the competition. Clerihan Venture was withdrawn injured before the English challenger Sole Aim ran superbly beating Postal Vote in a time of 28.99. Gahans Wood claimed the next semi-final pushing Time Up Please into second place in 29.37 and the final heat saw Butlers Glen overtake and beat Ivy Hall Flash in a shock result timed at 29.45.

The final featured three big names and it was the same trio that took the first three places. Postal Vote was first out of traps and gained a decent lead. By the second bend Sole Aim had forced his way on the inside of Postal Vote taking the lead at the third bend before coming home to win the Derby. Sole Aim had won the event for England, home track Walthamstow and owner Mrs Frances Chandler. Postal Vote held off Ivy Hall Flash for second place.

== Final result ==
At Shelbourne, 7 August (over 525 yards):

Position	Winner	Breeding	Trap	SP	Time	Trainer
1st	Sole Aim	Monalee Champion - Yurituni	1	6-4f	29.12	Dave Geggus (England)
2nd	Postal Vote	Dusty Trail - Paddistarr	5	9-4	29.24	Gay McKenna
3rd	Ivy Hall Flash	Proud Lincoln - Ivy Hall Rose	6	7-2	29.36	Paddy Keane
4th	Time Up Please	Newdown Heather - Dogstown Fame	4	10-1		Ger McKenna
5th	Gahans Wood	Myross Again - Pegs Wood	3	6-1		Charlie Byrne
6th	Butlers Glen	Newdown Prince - Northern Duchess	2	8-1		Michael Farrell

=== Distances ===
1½, 1½ (lengths)

== See also ==
- 1971 UK & Ireland Greyhound Racing Year
