= 1953 Irish Greyhound Derby =

- Venue: Harold's Cross Stadium
- Location: Dublin
- End date: 7 August
- Total prize money: £500 (winner)

The 1953 Irish Greyhound Derby took place during July and August with the final being held at Harold's Cross Stadium in Dublin on 7 August 1953.

The winner Spanish Battleship won £500 and was trained by Tom Lynch and owned by Tim 'Chubb' O'Connor.

== Final result ==
At Harold's Cross, 7 August (over 525 yards):

Position	Name of Greyhound	Breeding	Trap	SP	Time	Trainer
1st	Spanish Battleship	Spanish Chestnut - Ballyseedy Memory	1	2-1f	29.78	Tom Lynch
2nd	Smokey Glen	Fair Moving - Joanna Verge	2	3-1	29.84	Gay McKenna
3rd	Bob Vistable	unknown	4	5-1	30.20	
4th	Shilling Shy	Baytown Cuckoo - Fly's Daughter	6	3-1	30.23	
5th	Maestro	unknown	3	10-1		Harry Barry
6th	Rathealty View	Coshel View - Castle Mary	5	10-1		Robert Richardson

=== Distances ===
¾, 4½, neck (lengths)

== Competition Report ==
Tim 'Chubb' O'Connor had taken charge of a litter in Ireland sired by Spanish Chestnut (the half-brother of 1949 Irish Greyhound Derby champion Spanish Lad). One of the litter Spanish Battleship was entered for the St Leger at Limerick but after winning a heat he failed to progress from the second round. O'Connor felt that he had gone well enough and phoned Tom Lynch in Dublin and asked him to train the dog for forthcoming Derby. The Derby was due to be held at Harolds Cross where regular racegoers had already seen Spanish Battleship perform well there.

In the first round he won in 29.84 before winning his semi-final in 30.04. The Irish public took a liking to the greyhound and he was sent off 2-1 favourite for the final. The fawn brindle made his trademark exit from the traps by going into an early lead but was challenged by Gay McKenna's Smokey Glen for much of the race. Spanish Battleship stayed on gamely to take the final win in 29.78. Tom Lynch had deservedly won Ireland's premier race for the first time and Spanish Battleship was on his way to becoming the greatest greyhound in the history of Irish racing.

== See also ==
1953 UK & Ireland Greyhound Racing Year
