= 1954 Irish Greyhound Derby =

- Venue: Shelbourne Park
- Location: Dublin
- End date: 7 August
- Total prize money: £500 (winner)

The 1954 Irish Greyhound Derby took place during July and August with the final being held at Shelbourne Park in Dublin on 7 August 1954.

The winner Spanish Battleship won £500 and was trained by Tom Lynch and owned by Tim 'Chubb' O'Connor.

== Final result ==
At Shelbourne, 7 August (over 525 yards):

Position	Name of Greyhound	Breeding	Trap	SP	Time	Trainer
1st	Spanish Battleship	Spanish Chestnut - Ballyseedy Memory	2	4-11f	29.64	Tom Lynch
2nd	Dignity	Dividend - Ballymore Bargain	5	100-6	29.88	Jimmy Dunne
3rd	Aughacommon Rex	unknown	1	100-6	30.20	
4th	Olly's Quare Rebel	Riverdale Rebel - Quare Fire	3	7-1		
5th	Palm's Son	Bella's Prince - Palm Swell	6	15-2		Nick Breen
6th	Moyola Flash	Daring Flash - Culbane Mill	4	25-1		

=== Distances ===
3, 4 (lengths)

== Competition Report ==
The defending champion Spanish Battleship headed for Shelbourne Park following a rest because he had injured a leg during the 1954 Callanan Cup final. After the first night's racing doubts surfaced that he could successfully defend his title because he had been injured and a greyhound called Leafy Ash who had finished second in the 1954 English Greyhound Derby final recorded 29.93, in a first round win. However, the following evening Spanish Battleship then proceeded to break the track record with a remarkable 29.50 run, which led to the Irish press stating that it was a foregone conclusion that the dog would win again. The second round win was impressive but nine spots slower than his first round win; the next best being Ollys Quare Rebel in 29.74.

In the semi-finals Spanish Battleship equalled his own track record winning eight lengths ahead of Dignity. Aughacommon Rex beat Moyola Flash and Palm's Son defeated Olly's Quare Rebel in the remaining semi-finals.

Spanish Battleship wrote his name into the history books as the first ever two time Irish Derby winner despite missing his break from the traps in the final. He showed enough of his renowned early pace to quickly overtake early leader Dignity and go on to win by three lengths in 29.64.

== See also ==
- 1954 UK & Ireland Greyhound Racing Year
