= Spanish Battleship =

Irish racing greyhound

- Sire: Spanish Chestnut
- Dam: Ballyseedy Memory
- Sex: Dog
- Whelped: August 1951
- Died: July 1962 (aged 10)
- Color: Fawn - Brindle markings
- Breeder: Tadgh Drummond
- Owner: Tim 'Chubb' O'Connor
- Trainer: Tom Lynch

Honours
- 3 × winner of the Irish Greyhound Derby

Spanish Battleship (August 1951 - July 1962) was a male fawn and brindle greyhound. He is celebrated as one of Ireland's greatest racing greyhounds.

== Early life ==
Spanish Battleship was whelped in August 1951 as part of a litter of seven. His owner Tim 'Chubb' O'Connor had leased a bitch called Ballyseedy Memory from breeder Tadgh Drummond so that he could mate her with Spanish Chestnut (the half brother of 1949 Irish Greyhound Derby champion Spanish Lad). After the litter was born he was reared by Sheila O’Connor, sister of Chubb O'Connor. The greyhound avoided being sold to the UK after being bitten by a pig and therefore stayed in Ireland to recover.

== Racing career ==
=== 1953 ===
He was entered for the 1953 St Leger at Limerick but after winning a heat he failed to progress from the second round. O'Connor felt that he had gone well enough and phoned trainer Tom Lynch in Dublin and asked him to train the dog for forthcoming 1953 Irish Greyhound Derby. The Derby was due to be held at Harolds Cross where regular racegoers had already seen Spanish Battleship perform well there. He won the competition and was well on his way to becoming the greatest greyhound in the history of Irish racing. Next he was to take part in three competitions the Laurels, the McCalmont Cup and McAlinden Cup and remarkably he won every single qualifier (nine races in all) but on all three occasions when he lined up in the finals he was to fail at the final hurdle. However it was considered a very successful year for the greyhound.

=== 1954 ===
Spanish Battleship claimed the Tostal Cup at Harolds Cross and Easter Cup at Shelbourne Park before an injury curtailed his efforts in the Callanan Cup final and connections worried that the dog would not be fit in time to defend his Irish Derby title. The Irish Derby was taking place at Shelbourne Park and the good news was that Spanish Battleship was fit to defend his crown and would be hot favourite based on his current form. Leafy Ash who had finished second in the 1954 English Greyhound Derby recorded 29.93 in a first night, first round heat to set the bar. The following evening Spanish Battleship broke the track record with a remarkable 28.50 run, leading to the Irish press stating that it was a foregone conclusion for the dog to win again. After a second round win he equalled his own track record in the semi-finals. The final looked like a formality and so it proved as Spanish Battleship wrote his name into the history books as the first ever two time Irish Derby winner. Despite missing his break in the decider he showed enough of that renowned early pace to win by three lengths in 29.64.

Before ending the 1954 season he would win the Tipperary Cup with two track record runs and a victory in the McCalmont Cup.

=== 1955 ===
Spanish Battleship started his Irish campaign in similar circumstances as the previous year by winning the Easter Cup again but losing in the Tostal Cup. In July he went for a third successive time Irish Derby title. The four year old was still in great form but many feared that younger greyhounds would get the better of him and those fears were heightened when caught before the line by Crostys Bell in a first round defeat. Trainer Tom Lynch had other entries in the competition and two dead heated in that first round, they were Imperial Toast and Dancing Jester. Makra Bibs had defeated Spanish Battleship in the Tostal Cup and he went fastest in 29.68. Due to there being only 36 entries this year there was a rest before the semi-finals and Lynch gave Battleship a trial which seemed to help because when the semis arrived he won his heat from Mile Bush Champion by three lengths and Makra Bibs failed to make the final.

The Harolds Cross stadium was overwhelmed by crowds attempting to get a look at the greyhound in the final and he was backed into favourite at 5–4 with Crostys Bell drifting in the market at 7–4. Spanish Battleship was first away from the traps again and stretched to a three length victory from Crostys Bell. Ireland celebrated the best greyhound they had ever seen and he became a national icon. Before he retired, he broke the track record at Cork Greyhound Stadium during his Laurels victory later that month followed by another McCalmont Cup success and ran in a few exhibition races. Connections turned down a £15,000 bid from a London syndicate, a staggering amount in 1955.

In December he travelled to England for the first and only time with White City his destination for a special match race with Duet leader and Hi There. Age had caught up with him and home track advantage to his rivals proved too much as he trailed in last. Tom Lynch and Tim O'Connor retired him to stud.

He died in the summer of 1962 at the kennels of O'Connor in Kilorgan.

== Pedigree ==
Rebel Light
Rebel Abbey
Thomas B's Pet
Spanish Chestnut
Caeraloptic
Cordal Moonlight
Cordal Rover
Spanish Battleship
Chaney Eye
Heartbreak Harry
Evelyns Lady
Ballyseedy Memory
Sandals Way
Get Up Ballyseedy
Old Cause
