= 1957 UK & Ireland Greyhound Racing Year =

The 1957 UK & Ireland Greyhound Racing Year was the 32nd year of greyhound racing in the United Kingdom and the 31st year of greyhound racing in Ireland.

== Roll of honour ==
Major Winners
Award	Name of Winner
1957 English Greyhound Derby	Ford Spartan
1957 Irish Greyhound Derby	Hopeful Cutlet
1957 Scottish Greyhound Derby	Ballypatrick
1957 Welsh Greyhound Derby	Go Doggie Go
Greyhound of the Year	Duet Leader

== Summary ==
Marsh Barton Stadium in Exeter closed; many smaller independent tracks were susceptible to closure, mainly due to the fact that government taxing of tote profits outweighed the income from attendances. This was leaving many of them untenable. Regulated tracks under the National Greyhound Racing Club (NGRC) banner were better off and remained successful, with annual tote turnover still around £55 million. The Greyhound Racing Association (GRA) continued to be the most successful greyhound company (as it had been every year since the introduction of racing in 1926). The Chairman Francis Gentle announced that net profits had increased to £119,000 but the sale of Harringay Arena had been agreed because it was operating at a loss. It was sold to the Home and Colonial Stores Ltd. Gentle remains Chairman of the company but relinquishes his role as Managing Director to be replaced by Laddie Lucas.

Ford Spartan won the 1957 English Greyhound Derby and Duet Leader was voted Greyhound of the Year.

== Competitions ==
Kilcaskin Kern won the Irish St Leger and then went through a hectic schedule, flown straight to London to join new trainer Tony Dennis. The fawn dog then qualified for the Cloth of Gold at Charlton with three quick trials on three successive days. The decision was justified after he won the title. He also won Grand Prix at Walthamstow Stadium later in the year.

Ford Spartan (the Derby champion) won Laurels at Wimbledon Stadium but was then surprisingly retired to stud after just fourteen months racing.

Duke of Alva won all his races in reaching the St Leger final at Wembley and recorded sub 40 second runs in each round, the final was televised live on the BBC.

== News ==
Scoutbush was sold for $4,500, shortly after his Cesarewitch victory, to stand at stud in the United States. Sir Arthur Elvin MBE died, he had saved Wembley Stadium and turned it into one of the most famous stadiums in the world. Without him it would have been demolished in 1926.

Elias Jolley stood trial, after the 80 year old general manager of White City Stadium (Nottingham) was accused of widespread rigging of tote odds and destroying evidence. It was agreed by the London Greyhound Tracks committee that any greyhound disqualified for fighting would lose any prize money and trophies but it would not affect the result in terms of betting.

Derby runner-up Highway Tim was stolen from the kennels of Rosalie Beba, one month after the Derby final but was recovered safely after the van carrying them crashed and the driver was arrested.

== Ireland ==
The unsuccessful ante post Irish Greyhound Derby favourite, Solar Prince, went on to win the Tipperary Cup and Callanan Cup before winning a White City invitation race featuring Kilcaskin Kern, Ballypatrick and Northern King, held on the Oaks final night.

Prairie Champion has his first race was on 10 October 1957, when he participated in the McCalmont Cup at Kilkenny. He won his heat by ten lengths in 29.80 seconds and then won the final. After recording 29.10 seconds in a 525 yards trial at Harold's Cross Stadium he was bought by Al Burnett, who was known for owning the Pigalle Club in London and renamed Pigalle Wonder.

== Principal UK races ==
Grand National, White City (May 4 525y h, £300)
Pos	Name of Greyhound	Trainer	SP	Time	Trap
1st	Tanyard Tulip	Jack Harvey	2-1	29.85	5
2nd	Fodda Champion	Jimmy Jowett	10-11f	30.01	4
3rd	Johnnie Pops		10-1	30.65	1
4th	Harwin Boyerler		66-1	31.05	3
5th	Imperial Fawn	Dave Geggus	5-1	31.61	2
6th	Overleigh Headline		33-1	00.00	6

Gold Collar, Catford (May 25, 440y, £500)
Pos	Name of Greyhound	Trainer	SP	Time	Trap
1st	Silent Worship	John Bassett	4-11f	25.50	1
2nd	Ford Squire	Dennis Hannafin	7-1	25.53	4
3rd	Parkland Hero	Miss G.Barrett	25-1	25.77	5
4th	Fairy Lawn Champion		5-1	25.97	2
5th	Rail Guard	Bill Matthews	25-1	26.13	3
6th	Chilly White		33-1	26.33	6

Welsh Derby, Arms Park (Jul 6, 525y £500)
Pos	Name of Greyhound	Trainer	SP	Time	Trap
1st	Go Doggie Go	Jack Toseland	5-4f	29.38	3
2nd	Northern King	Jack Harvey	5-2	29.46	6
3rd	Quare Fool	Harry Buck	3-1	29.70	1
4th	Black Coak	Paddy McEvoy	50-1	29.86	2
5th	The Grand Genius		7-1	29.90	4
6th	Sober Lane		25-1	29.94	5

Scottish Greyhound Derby, Carntyne (Jul 13, 525y, £250)
Pos	Name of Greyhound	Trainer	SP	Time	Trap
1st	Ballypatrick	Cyril Beaumont	7-1	29.53	2
2nd	Frisky Look	Jimmy Jowett	2-5f	29.55	4
3rd	Grange Son		16-1	29.87	1
4th	Parkside Paul		8-1	29.95	3
5th	Simmer Down Pal	Joe Booth	5-1	30.19	5

Scurry Gold Cup, Clapton (Jul 27, 400y £600)
Pos	Name of Greyhound	Trainer	SP	Time	Trap
1st	Lisbrook Chieftain	Reg Holland	6-1	23.09	5
2nd	Prince Galtee	Jack Harvey	4-1	23.41	3
3rd	Frisky Look	Jimmy Jowett	7-2	23.51	1
4th	Dark Rose	W.G.Brown	9-2	23.52	4
5th	Pointers Prince	Tom Smith	5-2f	23.53	6
6th	Customers Blazer		20-1	23.75	2

Laurels, Wimbledon (Aug 23, 500y, £1,000)
Pos	Name of Greyhound	Trainer	SP	Time	Trap
1st	Ford Spartan	Dennis Hannafin	2-7f	27.89+	5
2nd	Clara Prince	Paddy McEvoy	9-2	27.95	2
3rd	Bloom Again	J Taylor	8-1	28.15	3
4th	Cleos Gossip	Bob Burls	33-1	28.47	1
5th	Star of India		20-1	28.48	6
6th	Rail Guard	Bill Matthews	100-1	28.62	4

+Track Record

St Leger, Wembley (Sep 9, 700y, £1,000)
Pos	Name of Greyhound	Trainer	SP	Time	Trap
1st	Duke of Alva	Dicky Myles	4-6f	39.97	1
2nd	Highway Tim	Mrs.R.Beba	9-4	40.25	6
3rd	Scoutbush	Bob Burls	100-7	40.31	2
4th	Canuever		25-1	40.45	4
5th	Gurthrush Boy	Leslie Reynolds	33-1	40.89	5
6th	Dark Rose	W.G.Brown	9-1	41.01	3

The Grand Prix Walthamstow (Sep 24, 525y, £1,000)
Pos	Name of Greyhound	Trainer	SP	Time	Trap
1st	Kilcaskin Kern	Tony Dennis	8-11f	29.25	3
2nd	Racing Don	Jim Syder Jr.	4-1	29.69	6
3rd	Limafe	Dave Barker	7-1	29.81	2
4th	Name the Peace	Tom Reilly	6-1	29.93	4
5th	Flying Customer		25-1	30.09	5
6th	The Gifts Champion	Alf Forman	100-7	30.17	1

Oaks, White City (Sep 28, 525y, £500)
Pos	Name of Greyhound	Trainer	SP	Time	Trap
1st	Dark Rose	W G Brown	4-6f	29.02	2
2nd	Cute Customer	Ronnie Melville	7-2	29.34	5
3rd	Ford Spectre	Dennis Hannafin	7-1	29.37	1
4th	Kilcaskin Katherine	Johnny Bullock	100-6	29.41	3
5th	Crosty Biddy	Alf Forman	8-1	29.51	4
6th	Chester Grand		100-6	29.52	6

Cesarewitch, West Ham (Oct 11, 600y, £1,000)
Pos	Name of Greyhound	Trainer	SP	Time	Trap
1st	Scoutbush	Bob Burls	7-4f	33.05	1
2nd	Highwood Sovereign	Leslie Reynolds	13-2	33.17	2
3rd	Hurry Cleo (dh)		66-1	33.31	4
3rd	Clara Prince (dh)	Paddy McEvoy	9-4	33.31	6
5th	Highway Tim	Mrs.R.Beba	5-2	33.45	3
6th	Land of Song	Bob Burls	7-1	33.59	5

dh=dead heat
