= 1957 Irish Greyhound Derby =

- Venue: Harold's Cross Stadium
- Location: Dublin
- End date: 9 August
- Total prize money: £500 (winner)

The 1957 Irish Greyhound Derby took place during July and August with the final being held at Harold's Cross Stadium in Dublin on 9 August 1957.

The winner Hopeful Cutlet won £500 and was trained by Jack Mullan and owned by Rostrevor veterinary surgeon Chris Farrelly.

== Final result ==
At Harold's Cross, 9 August (over 525 yards):

Position	Name of Greyhound	Breeding	Trap	SP	Time	Trainer
1st	Hopeful Cutlet	Imperial Dancer - Katie the Duck	6	7-2	29.60	Jack Mullan
2nd	The Grand Fire	The Grand Champion - Quare Fire	2		30.02	Paddy Dunphy
3rd	Country Boy	unknown	4		30.38	
unplaced	Tullaherin Twinkle	unknown	5			
unplaced	Romola's Dante	Ollys Pal - Im Yours	1			Doyle
unplaced	Howardstown Ranger	unknown	3			J Garfinkle

=== Distances ===
5¼, 4½ (lengths)

== Competition Report ==
The ante-post favourite was Solar Prince who had arrived for the Derby after winning the Callanan Cup final where he beat Romola's Dante by six lengths. He duly won his first round heat in the fastest first round time of 29.47. However he was withdrawn before the second round and later that evening Noisy Sam set a new track record of 29.41. The other second round winners were Hopeful Cutlet, Bugatti and Red Riot. In the first semi-final The Grand Fire sealed an easy win at odds of 4-9 in 29.58, but bruised a leg in running. The second semi-final resulted in Hopeful Cutlet beating Tullaherin Twinkle but favourite Noisy Sam stumbled badly and failed to get through to the final.

In the final Hopeful Cutlet vied with Tullaherin Twinkle before taking a decisive lead and winning by three lengths. The Grand Fire was slow away and found trouble before running on well for second place.

== See also ==
- 1957 UK & Ireland Greyhound Racing Year
