= Curraheen Park =

Greyhound racing venue in County Cork, Ireland

- Interactive map of Curraheen Park
- Location: Curraheen Road, Bishopstown, County Cork, Ireland
- Coordinates: 51.87614°N 8.54986°W
- Operated by: Greyhound Racing Ireland
- Date opened: 2000
- Race type: greyhound racing

Curraheen Park Greyhound Stadium is a greyhound racing track located in Bishopstown, west of Cork, County Cork, Ireland.

Racing takes place every Friday and Saturday evening and the facilities include the grandstand Laurels restaurant, fast food facilities, a number of bars, totalisator betting and ample seating.

Race distances are 330, 525, 550, 575, 750 and 810 yards and the feature competitions at the track is the Laurels.

== History ==
Curraheen Park Greyhound Stadium is situated to the west of Cork on the Curraheen Road in Bishopstown. The track opened in the year 2000 as a replacement for the previous track the Cork (Western Road) Greyhound Stadium which is now the Western Gateway Building (science building of the University College Cork). The stadium is a third generation Cork Greyhound Stadium with the first two being the Show Grounds Greyhound Track (1928-1935) and then the previously mentioned Western Road stadium (1936-1996).

The sale of the old track enabled the Bord na gCon to fund a new stadium with modern facilities). The new stadium opened on 8 April 2000 costing IR£8.5 million and included a glass fronted grandstand as the centrepiece (the glass alone cost IR£400,000). The official opening date was 20 May 2000. The new track offered race distances of 330, 525, 550, 575 and 700 yards and the long serving Noel Holland remained as the Racing Manager but would retire in 2004. The Laurels remains the primary competition held at the track and since 2000 winners have included Sonic Flight, Ardkill Jamie and Razldazl Rioga.

Following the closure of Harolds Cross in 2017 the Grand National was brought to the track. Brian Collins had been racing manager at Curraheen Park for a number of years until 2024, before being replaced by Darren Hogan, as Collins took up a more senior role overseeing the tracks in Munster.

== Competitions ==
- Laurels
- Grand National

== Current track records ==
Yards	Greyhound	Time (sec)	Date	Notes
330	Quietly	17.14	12 March 2016	
525	Illnotbeback	27.81	5 November 2022	
550	Killmacdonagh	29.07	29 June 2019	The Shelley Fennely Memorial Final
575	Nikita Billie	30.62	12 July 2003	
750	Airmount Tess	41.02	03 June 2017	Barry's Tea Open Stake Semi-Final
810	Shelbourne Kay	45.58	11 June 2005	
810	Slick Season	45.58	18 March 2011	
525 H	Comeout Russell	28.59	11 July 2015	

== Former track records ==
Extended content

Yards	Greyhound	Time (sec)	Date	Notes
330	Quarrymount Rory	17.47	20 September 2000	
330	Kilboy Oak	17.44	13 March 2004	
330	Paulo Coelho	17.40	17 March 2004	
330	Leeview Dave	17.34	13 October 2012	
525	Moyne Rebel	28.25	7 October 2000	
525	Rutland Budgie	28.25	25 October 2001	
525	Larkhill River	28.21	28 September 2002	
525	Coolmona Dave	28.14	14 June 2003	
525	Fat Budgie	28.08	15 May 2004	
525	Ardkill Jamie	28.03	23 September 2006	
525	Droopys Robinho	28.03	29 September 2007	
525	Ballymac Vic	27.94	29 September 2012	
525	Curious Boy	27.85	25 June 2016	Laurels heats
525	Droopys Edison	27.83	25 October 2022	Laurels 2nd round
550	Owenabue River	29.90	2 August 2001	
550	Longvalley Tina	29.84	26 February 2002	
550	Confident Choice	29.74	24 October 2002	
550	Minglers Prime	29.66	23 November 2002	
550	Make All	29.46	20 March 2004	
550	Goldstar Lee	29.42	21 October 2006	
550	Ghost Town	29.36	28 June 2014	
550	Velvet John Joe	29.32	22 July 2017	
550	Killmacdonagh	29.15	22 June 2019	
700	Drifting Tide	38.80	4 August 2001	
700	Hello Bud	38.74	24 November 2001	
700	Blue Boomer	38.61	18 May 2002	
750	Air Force Honcho	41.53	30 October 2003	
750	Kilquane Lass	41.51	22 November 2003	
750	Guess Whos Comin	41.41	20 November 2004	
750	Heart Rumble	41.30	13 May 2006	
750	Woe Katie	41.22	31 May 2014	
750	Woe Katie	41.19	14 June 2014	
750	Fire Height Amy	41.14	6 June 2015	
525 H	Hilldun Pat	30.31	17 August 2002	
525 H	Top Lark	29.50	30 October 2004	
525 H	Top Lark	29.18	29 October 2005	
525 H	Bay Star	28.99	21 October 2006	
525 H	Kiel Razzle	28.84	20 June 2014	
525 H	Shouragh Matty	28.78	28 June 2014	
550 H	Lenson Returns	31.16	14 September 2000	
