= McCalmont Cup =

Irish greyhound race

- Class: Feature
- Location: Kilkenny Greyhound Stadium
- Inaugurated: 1947
- Sponsor: Frightful Flash Kennels

Race information
- Distance: 525 yards
- Surface: Sand
- Purse: €15,000 (winner)

The McCalmont Cup is a greyhound racing competition held annually at Kilkenny Greyhound Stadium at St. James' Park, Kilkenny, Ireland.

The competition is a feature competition in the Irish racing calendar organised by the Irish Greyhound Board.

The event was won by three times Irish Greyhound Derby champion Spanish Battleship in 1954 & 1955 and the competition was known as the Red Mills Stake & Kilkenny Cup from 1994-2005.

== Venues and distances ==
- 1947–present (Kilkenny 525y)

== Sponsors ==
- 1999–2005 (Red Mills)
- 2006–2008 (Kilford Hotel)
- 2009–2012 (Broadway Pet Foods)
- 2013–2013 (Kilford Arms Hotel)
- 2014–2025 (Frightful Flash Kennels)

== Past winners ==
Year	Winner	Breeding	Time (sec)	Trainer	SP	Notes/ref
1947	Lady Maud	Bella's Prince - Peg's Empress		Michael Cunningham		Track record
1948	Moving Sandy				3/1	
1949	17 Sep					
1950	Kindly Friend	Shaggy Lad - Kindle	30.30	T Kennedy	6/4f	
1951	The Grand Champion	Mad Tanist - Could Be Worse		Paddy Dunphy		
1954	Spanish Battleship	Spanish Chestnut - Ballyseedy Memory		Tom Lynch		
1955	Spanish Battleship	Spanish Chestnut - Ballyseedy Memory		Tom Lynch		
1957	Prairie Champion	Champion Prince - Prairie Peg				
1963	April Twilight	Solar Prince – Foxs Heather	29.60			
1964	Good Brandy	Hi There – Donore Mistress	30.00	J O'Gorman		
1965	Come on Baunie	Prairie Flash – Cracked Kate	30.20			
1966	Brandon Jungle	Jungle Man – Brandons Pride	30.30			
1967	Hack Em Jo Jo	Hack Up Jo Jo – Hack Up Millie	30.40	T Tynan		
1968	Limestone	Castle Tontine – Pleasant Sunset	29.65	Mrs T Finn		
1969	Seafield Mink	Prairie Flash – Seafield Min	29.60			
1970	Ballyea Hope	Variety Hope – Ballyrichard Speed	29.20	F Buckley		
1971	The Grand	Light Tontine – April Twilight	29.60	Paddy Dunphy		
1972	Grey Light	Money Grand – Pelican Light	29.60	L Loughnane		
1973	Tain Rua	Yanka Boy – An Tain	29.75	Paddy Nolan		
1974	Shady Ruffian	Newdown Heather – Fragile Beige	29.70	G McKenna		
1975	Goodbye John	Own Pride – Santas Rose	29.70	Matt O'Donnell		
1976	Antone Wonder	Quiet Spring – Mountprim Ka	29.85	J Hayes		
1977	Jolly Youth	Red Game – Jolly Jet	29.65	T Raleigh		
1978	Alert Bell	Rail Ship – Advance Miss	29.35	Mrs C Flynn		
1979	Lax Law	Tain Mor – Lady Rowley	29.35	M Lennon		
1980	Flying Marble	Sole Aim – LTS Princess	29.70	M Collins		
1981	Anner Duke	Ballintee Star – Cloneen Blossom	29.60	P O’Connor		
1982	Azuri	Brave Bran – Under The Stone	29.60	M Daly		
1983	Tobergal Express W	hitefort Lad – Dillys Silver	29.28	J Gahan		
1984	Danubio Mink	Minnesota Miller – Daunubio Girl	29.86	P Hutton		
1985	Ranslee	Limerick Echo – Murlens Deb	29.76	J Byrne		
1986	Echo King	Limerick Echo – Lough Kent Rose	29.58	J O'Leary		
1987	Keystone Prince	Keystone Rocket – Hardihostess	29.58	L Dwan		
1988	Deenside Sandy	Wise Band – Local Nell	29.26	S Boran		
1989	Lough Sultan	Knockash Rover – Carrowkeal Doll	29.48	L Molloy		
1990	Tanyas Diamond	Sinbad - Santel	29.80	D Ryan		
1991	Fast Arrow	Im Slippy – Elf Arrow	29.59	Martin Ryan		
1992	Karibu Lass	Satharn Beo - Wigston LAdy	29.44	Michael Doyle		
1994	Up The Junction	Slippy Quest – Elf Arrow	29.08	Pat Norris		
1997	Funny Boy	Super Mario – Aubrey Rose	29.51	Mary Russell	2/1	
1998	Newline Touch	New Level - Yagoodthing	29.38	Ger McKenna		
1999	Astral Walk	Star Treasure – Walk Siobhan	29.35	Paul Hennessy		
2000	Airmount Petit	Mountleader Peer – Airmount Grand	29.11	Gerald Kiely	4/6f	
2001	Deenside Chip	Top Honcho – Deenside Jenny	29.17	Nicola Boran	9/4	
2002	Black Cat Jim	Mustang Jack – Blackcat Colleen	29.19	Eleanor Cleere	7/4f	
2003	Haven House	Top Honcho - Pinnacle	29.47	George Smart	3/1	
2005	Elteen Nell	Honcho Classic – Ballinclare Lark	29.12	Mary Brennan	2/1f	
2006	Crossleigh Pilot	Borna Pilot – Crossleigh Lark	28.95	Madeleine O’Brien	11/10f	
2007	Benjo	Fortune Mike – Winner Born	29.38	Joe Rafferty	7/2	
2008	Ballygur Mike	Droopys Agassi – Big Picture	29.60	Michael Kelly	5/2	
2010	Running Smart	Daves Mentor – Tari Side	29.49	Joe Anglim	6/1	
2011	Jumeirah Joe	Brett Lee – Droopys Just Hot	29.29	Rynal Ruane	11/2	
2012	Shaneboy Spencer	Droopys Scolari – Shaneboy Maria	29.01	Colette Kiely	5/2	
2013	Boherna Rumble	Ace Hi Rumble – Hondo On Air	28.89	Pat Buckley	4/1	
2014	Droopys Der	Ace Hi Rumble – Droopys Twirl	29.14	John Linehan	9/4	
2015	Kilara Hey Mac	Ullid Conor – Kilara Gypsy	28.79	Paul Hennessy	5/4f	
2016	Doctor Zhivago	Ace Hi Rumble – Ballymac Sasha	29.02	David Flanagan	6/1	
2017	Karlow Crean	Ace Hi Rumble – Karlow Ming	29.08	Henry Kelly	7/2	
2018	Ballybough Dad	Ballymac Vic – High St Miley	29.06	Martin 'Murt' Leahy	5/4f	
2019	Skywalker Rafa	Laughil Blake – Coolavanny Royce	28.87	Michael J O'Donovan	4/7f	
2020	No race due to (COVID-19 pandemic)					
2021	Dark Devil	Ballymac Vic – Bull Run Ballad	28.86	Martin (Murt) Leahy	No SP	No SP due to COVID-19
2022	Zoom	Coolavanny Jap – Droopys Dorothy	28.90	Martin (Murt) Leahy	9/4	
2023	Lynchy Boy	Confident Rankin – Boozed Bubble	29.46	Paraic Campion	3/1	
2024	Bogger Dusty	Droopys Biker – Mustang Swift	29.18	Liam Peacock	4/1	
2025	Lotto Other News	Good News – Shes Made It	28.64	Shaun Conway	2/1f	
