= 1957 English Greyhound Derby =

- Location: White City Stadium
- Start date: 15 June
- End date: 29 June
- Total prize money: £1,500 (winner)

The 1957 Greyhound Derby took place during June with the final being held on 29 June 1957 at White City Stadium. The winner was Ford Spartan and the winning owners Frank Hill and Sid Frost received £1,500. Ford Spartan was reared by Robert Bolt.

== Final result ==
At White City (over 525 yards):

Position	Name of Greyhound	Breeding	Trap	SP	Time	Trainer
1st	Ford Spartan	Polonius - Harrow Glamour	1	1-1f	28.84	Dennis Hannafin (Wimbledon)
2nd	Highway Tim	Magourna Reject - Hunston Bell	2	11-2	28.87	Mrs Rosalie Beba (Private)
3rd	Land of Song	Fire Prince - Old Blarney Gift	3	100-8	28.95	Bob Burls (Wembley)
4th	Highwood Sovereign	Westbourne - Pretty Miss Amber	6	9-2	29.19	Leslie Reynolds (Wembley)
5th	Gallant And Gay	Champion Prince - Consequence	5	33-1	29.29	Joe Pickering (White City - London)
6th	Quare Fool	Quare Customer - Racing Fool	4	3-1	29.53	Harry Buck (White City - London)

=== Distances ===
Neck, 1, 3, 1 1/4, 3 (lengths)
The distances between the greyhounds are in finishing order and shown in lengths. From 1950 one length was equal to 0.08 of one second.

== Competition Report ==
Northern King trained by Jack Harvey was installed as ante-post favourite for the 1957 Derby after enjoying a good season previously. The Pall Mall Stakes and newly crowned Gold Collar champion Silent Worship was second on the ante-post list with Puppy Derby Champion Ford Spartan third. Jack McAllister the owner of 1956 champion Dunmore King, sent over Irish entry Scoutbush. A second entry from McAllister was a greyhound called Ricardus and he was put with trainer Paddy McEvoy. Oaks champion First But Last and Grand Prix champion Land of Song were two more leading entries. Kilcaskin Kern a recent track record holder at Cork Greyhound Stadium decided to stay in Ireland.

Before the first nights heats got underway Silent Worship was found to be lame which led to his owners selling him shortly afterwards. The first round provided another surprise when Moyne Rosette beat Northern King in a slow time of 29.45 sec. Ford Spartan impressed recording 28.74 to become the new favourite. Scoutbush who had been purchased by new owners after the first round went out during the next stage but Northern King returned to form with a win and there were successes for First But Last and Ford Spartan.

In the semi-finals Quare Fool claimed the first heat leading all the way, Highwood Sovereign and Land of Song also progressed to make the final, leaving strong favourite Northern King fading into last place after encountering a bump at the start. The second heat saw Ford Spartan backed to 2-7f leading throughout and holding off the strong finishing Highway Tim.

In the final the first to show was Land of Song but he was soon caught at the first bend by Ford Spartan, who then showed good early pace to take a clear lead. From the fourth bend Highway Tim put in a burst of speed that forced the stewards to call for a photo finish but Ford Spartan had held on to claim the title.

== See also ==
1957 UK & Ireland Greyhound Racing Year
