= 1942 Irish Greyhound Derby =

Irish greyhound competition

- Venue: Cork Greyhound Stadium
- Location: Cork
- End date: 30 May
- Total prize money: £175 (winner); 2nd £45, 3rd £25

The 1942 Irish Greyhound Derby took place during May with the final being held at Cork Greyhound Stadium in Cork on 30 May.

The winner Uacterlainn Riac won £175 but despite the poor prize money the track experienced record crowds. John Crowley a local pub owner (Western Star in Cork) trained Uacterlainn Riac and Jerry Crowley from Ovens owned him. Uacterlainn Riac also won the McAlinden Cup the same year. Cork legend states that the pub was closed for days to huge celebratory crowd afterwards. Uacterlainn Riac (meaning Creamery Brindle) had an attempt at hurdling after the Derby but failed to take to them and plans for a Grand National double were scrapped.

== Final result ==
At Cork, 30 May (over 525 yards):

| Position | Name of Greyhound | Breeding | Trap | SP | Time (sec) | Trainer |
|---|---|---|---|---|---|---|
| 1st | Uacterlainn Riac | Creamery Border - Roisin Riac | 2 | 1/2f | 30.22 | John Crowley (Ovens) |
| 2nd | Munster Hills | Munster Vale - Was In It | 1 | 6/1 | 30.54 | M Madden (Clonakilty) |
| 3rd | Bluehill Creamery | breeding unknown | 5 | 4/1 | 30.70 | Mrs K O'Callaghan (Clonmel) |
| 4th | Sheehy’s Star | breeding unknown | | 10/1 | | |
| 5th | Cottage Luck | Lottys Luck - Champion Rattler | | 4/1 | | |
| 6th | Decimal Plus | breeding unknown | | 4/1 | | |

=== Distances ===
4, 2 (lengths)

== Competition Report ==
In the final Uacterlainn Riac broke well from the traps to lead all the way.

== See also ==
1942 UK & Ireland Greyhound Racing Year
