= Callanan Cup =

Former Irish greyhound racing competition

- Location: Harold's Cross Stadium
- Inaugurated: 1947
- Final run: 1981

Race information
- Distance: 525 yards

The Callanan Cup was a leading greyhound racing competition held annually at Harold's Cross Stadium in the city district of Harold's Cross, Dublin, Ireland.

It was inaugurated after the Second World War and was used by many leading connections as a warm up competition to the Irish Greyhound Derby.

It was a major competition and was an integral part of the Irish greyhound racing calendar and was set up in memory of Arthur 'Doc' Callanan after he died in October 1945. Callanan was the original veterinary surgeon at the Dublin track when it opened in 1928 and he saved the lives of Mick the Miller in 1928 and Creamery Border in 1932. The race was called the Callanan Memorial Cup from 1970-1981 after which it was discontinued.

== Past winners ==
Year	Winner	Time	Trainer	Notes
1947	Daring Flash			
1949	Last Tornado	30.20		
1952	The Grand Champion			
1954	Baytown Coak	29.44		
1957	Solar Prince		Ed Brennan	
1962	Jerrys Clipper	29.42	Jerry O'Dea	
1963	Bit of Game	29.55		
1964	Hi Express	29.70		
1965	Ardscull Lady	29.55		
1966	Clomoney Grand	29.03		
1967	Tiny'’s Tidy Town	29.40		
1968	Proud Lincoln	29.16		
1969	Finola's Yarn	29.72		
1970	Rosmore Robin	29.40		
1971	Lucky Punter	29.58		
1972	Eighthouses	29.62		
1973	Ardrine Moss	29.54		
1974	Tommy Astaire	29.26		
1975	Tommy Astaire	29.36		
1976	Peruvian Style	29.30		
1977	Cautious Cal	29.56	Liam Collins	
1979	Matlock	29.80		
1980	Endless Star	30.24		
1981	Blue Stone	30.18	Johnny Haynes	

== Venues & Distances ==
- 1947-1981 (Harolds Cross 525y)
