= Corn Cuchulainn =

Greyhound racing competition in Ireland

- Class: Feature
- Location: Shelbourne Park
- Inaugurated: 1961

Race information
- Distance: 750 yards
- Surface: Sand
- Purse: €10,500 (winner)

The Corn Cuchulainn is a greyhound racing competition held annually at Shelbourne Park and was formerly held at Harold's Cross Stadium in the city district of Harold's Cross, Dublin, Ireland.

It is a major competition and is an integral part of the Irish greyhound racing calendar. The competition was known as the Sean Kelly 750 in 1980.

In 2017 following the closure of Harold's Cross the race was switched to fellow Dublin track Shelbourne Park.

== Venues and distances ==
- 1963–2016 (Harolds Cross, 750y)
- 1999–1999 (Shelbourne Park, 750y)
- 2017–present (Shelbourne Park, 750y)

== Sponsors ==
- 1978–1978 (Sean Kelly Dublin Bookmakers)
- 2004–2007 (Vodafone)
- 2008–2009 (Accelerated Drain Cleaning)
- 2010–2020 (Gain Nutrition)
- 2023–2023 (Racing Post GTV)
- 2025–2025 (Donal Beatty Memorial)

== Past winners ==
Year	Winner	Breeding	Time (sec)	Trainer	SP	Notes/ref
1961	Special Move		42.78	Michael Sheehan		
1962	The Fixer	Flash Jack – Dream of Pleasure	43.05	R Martin		
1963	Danton	Mickeys Dan – Kings She Had	42.80			dead-heat
1963	Traceys Crisps	Sporting Jiggs - Ellas	42.80			dead-heat
1964	Chieftain's Envoy	Chieftains Guest – Just Sherry	42.70	Leslie McNair		Track record
1965	Westpark Quail	The Glen Abbey – Whiddy Bracelet	42.42			Track record
1966	Radiographer	Pigalle Wonder – Solfa Nella	42.77			
1967	Proud Molly	Clonalvy Pride – Aughadown Molly	43.40	Ger McKenna		
1968	The Saint	Mad Era – Hurricane Peg	43.20	T Manning		
1969	Hat Band	Wonder Valley – Greenhouse Girl	43.10	C McGovern		
1970	Quakerfield King	Newdown Heather – Mothel Prairie	42.54	D McDonald		
1971	Fleur des Lis	The Boy Boozer – Feis	43.27	J Farrell		
1972	Keeragh Bluff	Lucky Wonder - Mimsk	42.93	Bob Greeves		
1973	Rita's Choice	Spectre – Toffee Apple II	42.40	Ger McKenna		
1974	Purple Sun	Kilbeg Kuda – Miss Hi Land	43.04	Eugene Guerin	3/1	
1975	Cricky Choice	Right O'Myross – Lady Hairdresser	42.72	W Beggs		
1976	Lord of Moray	Yanka Rue – Graffogue	42.62	A Moore		
1977	Rathdaniel Irene	Lively Band - Irene Wong	42.74	J Murphy		
1978	Orient Champ	Monalee Champion – Yellow Ruler	42.58	W O'Riordan		
1979	Yvonnes Glory	Jimsun – Silent Treatment	42.90	J McGuill		
1980	Doolittle Sarah	Rockfield Era – Doolittle Dusty	43.10	Matt O'Donnell		
1981	Kilnaglory Pearl	Friendly Spectre – Flaming Pearl	42.72	Francie Murray		
1982	Jos Gamble	Ballydonnell Sam – Fealside Beauty	42.58	Francie Murray		
1983	Azuri	Brave Bran – Under The Stone	42.00	Mrs M Daly		
1984	Westpark Model	Daring Dandy – Slight Chili	42.54	F Allen		
1985	Fly Fancy	Sand Man – Ollys Angel	42.48	M O'Donovan		
1986	Ollys Missy	Sand Man – Ollys Nagel	42.46	O Moran		
1987	Newbrook Stoney	Its Ballyhenry – Newbrook Flash	42.38	M Boyce		
1988	Ruscar Dana	Sand Man – Kilnaspic Dana	43.50			
1991	Jeannie Flower	Curryhills Fox – Kingdom Flower	42.58			
1993	Gunboat Jeff	Whisper Wishes – Gunboat Ann	42.30	Joe Kenny		
1994	Arrancourt Lass	Ardfert Sean – The Other Toss		Matt O'Donnell		
1995	28 Jul					
1996	Aoifas Act	Coalbrook Tiger – Gatalley Raven				
1997	Aranock Girl	Frightful Flash - Glenmoira	42.22	Noel O'Meara	3-1	
1998	Winetavern Eile	Slaneyside Hare – Moonveen Wish	42.38	Patrick Savage	12-1	
1999	Nifty Niamh	Murlens Slippy – Pauls Turn	42.44	Seamus Graham	5-1	
2000	Frosty Rose	Spiral Nikita – Ullid Citrate	42.77	Paraic Campion	4/1	
2001	Hello Bud	Arrigle Buddy – Clonleigh Lass	41.78	Paul Hennessy	4/6f	
2002	Mega Delight	Smooth Rumble – Knockeevan Joy	41.98	Seamus Graham	2/5f	
2003	Topofthebest	Top Honcho – Pennys Model	42.34	Frazer Black	1/1f	
2004	Smiling Man	Jamella Prince – Micks Top Lass	41.62	Seamus Graham	7/2	
2005	De Eight Wonder	Top Honcho – Daisys Mustang	41.83	Paul Hennessy	10/1	
2006	Sonatina	Droopys Vieri – Christmas Holly	41.52	Siobhan McGrath	6/5jf	
2007	Droopys Ike	Droopys Vieri – Droopys Millie	42.06	Pat Buckley	4/6f	
2008	Olympic Show	Late Late Show – April Deen	41.87	Paul Hennessy	1/2f	
2009	Corporate Attack	Trendy Leigh – Black Raven	41.88	Sean Mulcahy	1/1f	
2010	Kiltrea Kev	Westmead Hawk – Kiltrea Lucy	41.70	John Doyle	1/1f	
2011	Fleeting Image	Head Bound – Dear Prudence	41.76	Dolores Ruth	4/1	
2012	Risky Bart	Premier Fantasy – Ogara Slams Em	41.98	Bridie Moore	7/2	
2013	Shanless Becky	Royal Impact – Shanless Carol	41.71	Brendan Cullen	9/4	
2014	Razldazl Pacino	Makeshift – Dundooan Diva	42.18	Dolores Ruth	7/4f	
2015	Ballymac Bonnie	Head Bound – Zulu Nikita	41.26	Liam Dowling	5/4jf	
2016	Airmount Tess	Brett Lee – Airmount Pearl	41.84	Gerald Kiely	3/1	
2017	Airmount Tess	Brett Lee – Airmount Pearl	41.80	Gerald Kiely	4/5f	
2018	Javielenko	Ballymac Eske – Droopys Hilda	41.26	Pat Buckley	7/4	
2019	Skywalker Logan	Tarsna Havana – Sizzling Sarah	41.32	Patrick Guilfoyle	6/4f	
2020	Ballymac Kingdom	Definate Opinion – Coolavanny Angie	41.41	Liam Dowling	5/2jf	
2021	Priceless Jet	Droopys Jet – Ravenna	41.39	Paul Hennessy	9/4f	
2022	Crafty Kokoro	Droopys Sydney – Cockyorconfident	41.31	Peter Divilly	3/1	
2023	Kinturk Road	Ballymac Cashout – Ballymac Arminta	41.26	Liam Dowling	7/4jf	
2024	Tuono Charlie	Good News – Farronrory Bonny	41.32	Sharon Hunt	4/5f	
2025	Braveheart Bambi	Deerjet Sdney – Ambey Bamby	41.44	Pat Buckley	7/4	
