= 1949 Irish Greyhound Derby =

- Venue: Harold's Cross Stadium
- Location: Dublin
- End date: 12 August
- Total prize money: £1,000 (winner)

The 1949 Irish Greyhound Derby took place during July and August with the final being held at Harold's Cross Stadium in Dublin on 12 August 1949.

The winner Spanish Lad won £1,000 and was trained by Tim 'Chubb' O'Connor.

== Final result ==
At Harold's Cross, 12 August (over 525 yards):

Position	Name of Greyhound	Breeding	Trap	SP	Time	Trainer
1st	Spanish Lad	Shaggy Lad - Cordal Moonlight	4	2-1	29.87	Tim O'Connor
2nd	Merry Courier	Mad Tanist - Lucky Orna	1	3-1	30.07	
3rd	Rushton News	Tanimon - Fly Joan	5	100-8	30.11	
4th	Friends Everywhere	unknown	6	5-4f		
5th	Ballylanigan Blackout	unknown	3	20-1		
6th	Spanish Emperor	Shaggy Lad - Cordal Moonlight	2	100-6		

=== Distances ===
2½, ½ (lengths)

== Competition Report ==
Tim 'Chubb' O’Connor bred a successful litter from a mating with his brood bitch Cordal Moonlight. He mated her to Shaggy Lad and the subsequent litter of Spanish Lad, Spanish Emperor, Spanish Treasure and Ardraw Moonlight all performed well in coursing competitions which prompted O'Connor to mate her again. This time it was to Rebel Abbey and resulted in a greyhound named Spanish Chestnut. The older pair of Spanish Lad and Spanish Emperor were aimed at the Irish Derby and expected to do well.

Spanish Lad broke the track record in round one, heat eight, with a time of 29.75; however Spanish Emperor could only finish second in heat seven lengths behind Labrais Bella. Spanish Lad won his quarter-final from Labrais Bell and Spanish Emperor also made it through.

In the semi-finals a greyhound called Friends Everywhere set a surprise track record of 29.74sec. Merry Courier and Spanish Emperor made the final but Labrais Bella did not. The second semi was also a surprise when Rushton News defeated odds on favourite Spanish Lad.

The final trap draw looked bad for Spanish Lad because he started from trap four but he overcame this when making a very fast break from the traps and was an easy winner. His brother Spanish Chestnut won the Irish Laurels in early September, aged just 18 months, beating Derby champion and older half-brother Spanish Lad into second place.

== See also ==
- 1949 UK & Ireland Greyhound Racing Year
