= 1971 English Greyhound Derby =

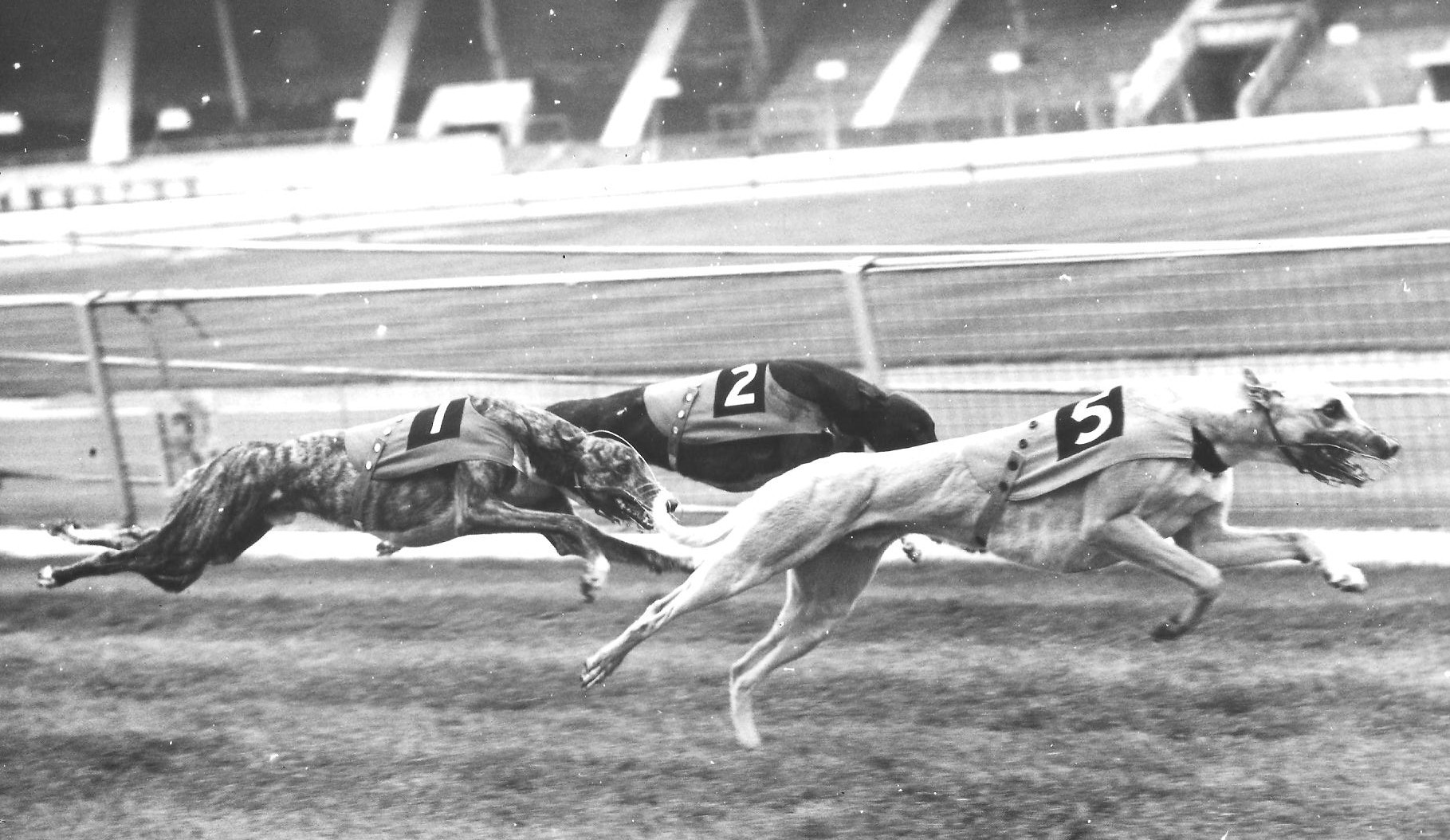
- Ivy Hall Flash beats Broadeves and Spectres Dream in qualifying
- Location: White City Stadium
- Start date: 12 June
- End date: 26 June
- Total prize money: £10,000 (winner)

The 1971 Greyhound Derby took place during June with the final being held on 26 June 1971 at White City Stadium. The winner was Dolores Rocket and the winning owner received £10,000. Dolores Rocket was bred and reared by his owner Bert White.

== Competition Report ==
With the National Greyhound Racing Club allowing trainers to seed+ their greyhounds wide for the first time it was generally agreed that there would be less crowding in races. Little County and Moordyke Spot had both retired but defending champion John Silver was entered for the competition. Clohast Rebel trained by Geoff De Mulder set a time of 28.28sec in a solo trial, two spots faster than the track record held by Yellow Printer. Laurels champion Sole Aim, Puppy Derby champion Crefogue Flash and Irish entry Postal Vote topped the ante-post lists alongside Clohast Rebel.

The qualifying round was held on a firm track and many greyhounds posted fast times including Postal Vote who recorded the best time of 28.33, a heat that ended with the elimination of John Silver. The fastest first round winner was Brighton's Hurst Wickham trained by Fred Lugg in a time of 28.56; Sole Aim, Crefogue Flash and Dolores Rocket also claimed heats.

Dolores Rocket and 'Leap and Run' both won second round heats and remained unbeaten whilst Clohast Rebel bounced back to winning ways in the fastest time of 28.39. Postal Vote and Gold Collar champ Down Your Way both failed to make it to the semi-finals. The semi-finals resulted in two 10-1 shot winners, the first was Leap and Run who had now made the final unbeaten. Clohast Rebel and Crefogue Flash failed to progress. The second semi went to Irish hope Ivy Hall Flash; Sole Aim handled by Nora Gleeson for the duration of the event went out.

The final saw Supreme Fun first away from the traps but Leap and Run soon took the lead and maintained an advantage from Supreme Fun and Moordyk Champion. However it was Dolores Rocket who came from last place to first becoming the first bitch to win the Derby since 1949. Dolores Rocket's dam was Come on Dolores owned by Ernie Gaskin Sr.

+Seeding (The process of classifying a greyhound to run in the inside traps or outside traps, known by the terms railer or wide runner.)

== Final result ==
At White City (over 525 yards):

Position	Name of Greyhound	Breeding	Trap	SP	Time	Trainer
1st	Dolores Rocket	Newdown Heather - Come On Dolores	2	11-4	28.74	Herbert White (Private)
2nd	Supreme Fun	Newdown Heather - Top Note	6	6-1	28.80	Sid Ryall (Private)
3rd	Leap and Run	Booked Out - Aubawns Dream	3	3-1	28.84	John Bassett (Private)
4th	Moordyk Champion	Monalee Champion - Nelsons Farewell	1	6-1	28.90	Freddie Warrell (Private)
5th	Cobbler	Monalee Champion - Yurituni	5	20-1	29.08	Dave Geggus (Walthamstow)
6th	Ivy Hall Flash	Proud Lincoln - Ivy Hall Rose	4	7-4f	29.20	Paddy Keane (Ireland)

=== Distances ===
¾, ½, ¾, 2¼, 1½ (lengths)
The distances between the greyhounds are in finishing order and shown in lengths. One length is equal to 0.08 of one second.

== Quarter finals ==
Heat 1
Pos	Name	SP	Time
1st	Dolores Rocket	3-1	28.61
2nd	Ivy Hall Flash	5-4f	28.79
3rd	Supreme Fun	7-2	28.85
4th	Davyhulme Expt	20-1	29.15
5th	Micks Pride	7-1	29.16
6th	Big Crash	25-1	29.24

Heat 2
Pos	Name	SP	Time
1st	Clohast Rebel	7-4	28.39
2nd	Michaels Bar	50-1	28.77
3rd	Sir Ginger	12-1	28.87
4th	Postal Vote	4-5f	28.89
5th	Spectre Jockey	8-1	29.19
6th	Herrhund	100-1	29.51

Heat 3
Pos	Name	SP	Time
1st	Leap And Run	4-1	28.88
2nd	Cobbler	14-1	28.94
3rd	Sole Aim	6-4f	29.00
4th	Down Your Way	9-4	29.06
5th	Mullas Shore	9-2	29.38
6th	Linmaree	8-1	30.98

Heat 4
Pos	Name	SP	Time
1st	Ballybeg Era	4-1	28.76
2nd	Moordyk Champ	14-1	28.90
3rd	Crefogue Flash	4-6f	28.92
4th	Hurst Wickham	3-1	28.98
5th	King Lester	10-1	29.66
6th	I'm Careful	33-1	29.68

== Semi finals ==
First Semi Final
Pos	Name of Greyhound	SP	Time	Trainer
1st	Leap And Run	10-1	28.67	Bassett
2nd	Moordyk Champion	10-1	28.93	Warrell
3rd	Cobbler	25-1	29.23	Geggus
4th	Ballybeg Era	10-1	29.24	Holloway
5th	Clohast Rebel	4-5f	29.30	De Mulder
6th	Crefogue Flash	3-1	29.56	Mitchell

Second Semi Final
Pos	Name of Greyhound	SP	Time	Trainer
1st	Ivy Hall Flash	10-1	28.76	Keane
2nd	Supreme Fun	7-2	28.86	Ryall
3rd	Dolores Rocket	11-8f	29.12	White
4th	Sole Aim	6-1	29.13	Geggus
5th	Michaels Bar	10-1	29.21	Rees Sr.
6th	Sir Ginger	14-1	29.31	Warrell

== See also ==
- 1971 UK & Ireland Greyhound Racing Year
