= Show Grounds Greyhound Track =

Former greyhound racing stadium in Cork, Ireland

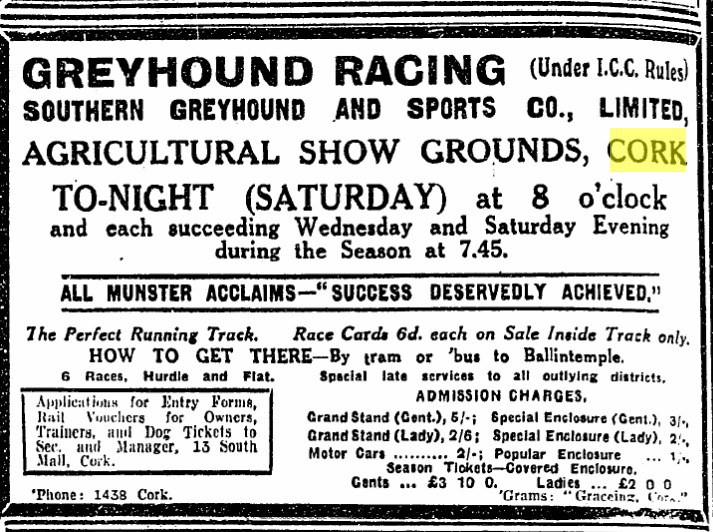
- Location: Ballintemple, Cork, Munster
- Coordinates: 51°53′55.146″N 8°26′1.454″W
- Opened: 27 June 1928
- Closed: 20 September 1935

The Show Grounds Greyhound Track was a greyhound racing track in Ballintemple, Cork.

== Origins ==
This track was the first provincial greyhound racing venue to be built in Ireland and the third behind Celtic Park and Shelbourne Park.

The track was constructed by the Southern Greyhound and Sports Company Limited, in part of the 27 acres known as Lower Park, which was owned by the Cork Agricultural Buildings Co Ltd. Lower Park was used by the County Cork Agricultural Society and ran from the present-day Centre Park Road to Blackrock. The society later became the Munster Agricultural Society, and buildings were constructed in c. 1895.

== Opening ==
In early 1928, the new stadium took shape; the construction was simple because there was already much in place such as the jumping enclosure where spectators viewed the show jumping from previous shows. There was accommodation for 20,000 people, car parking was for 1,000 cars and the kennels were listed as exhibition kennels allowing the public to view them. There was a tram service to Ballintemple and there were three price bands for the three areas of the grandstand, the 'special enclosure' and the 'popular enclosure'.

The secretary of the Irish Coursing Club (ICC) and a representative from the Greyhound Racing Control Board visited the facilities and gave the green light by issuing a licence under ICC rules. The racing started on Wednesday 27 June 1928 and events were held over 525 and 550 yards.

== Closure ==
The choice of venue had been constantly criticised by the press due to the fact that it was too far east and outside of the city, which ultimately led to closure on 20 September 1935 because a new venue was being constructed. The new venue was called the Cork Greyhound Stadium and was on Western Road which allowed the Cork public easier access.
