= Kilkenny Greyhound Stadium =

Greyhound racing venue in Kilkenny, Ireland

- Interactive map of Kilkenny Greyhound Stadium
- Location: St. James' Park, Kilkenny, Ireland
- Coordinates: 52°39′47.2″N 7°15′48.9″W
- Date opened: 1946
- Race type: greyhound racing

Kilkenny Greyhound Stadium is a greyhound racing track located in north-west Kilkenny in Ireland.

The racing takes place on a Wednesday and Friday evenings at 6.30pm.

St James Park in Kilkenny is a large park that contains sports pitches to the south and a greyhound track to the north. The greyhound circuit can be found south of Parkview Drive off the Freshford Road. Race distances are 300, 325, 550, 727, 750 & 1000 yards.

== History ==
The opening night was on 5 June 1946 and the first ever winner was Rebel Gunner. The following year the Kilkenny management wanted to introduce a major race to bring an identity to the track, they decided on a race over 525 yards and called it the McCalmont Cup. The first Winner in 1947 was a greyhound called Lady Maud who also broke the track record in winning the event. The McCalmont Cup attracted Ireland's biggest names each time it was held including the three times Irish Greyhound Derby champion Spanish Battleship who claimed the crown in both 1954 & 1955. Two years later in 1957 a greyhound called Prairie Champion took the honours; this brindle would have his name changed to Pigalle Wonder who went on to win the 1958 English Greyhound Derby.

The circuit has been described as both a good galloping track and too tight which is probably because of the slightly odd shape of the track. In addition to the McCalmont Cup the track hosted two other popular events called the Hurst Cup and Great Whistler Cup.

Jimmy Kinahan was the Racing Manager when the track opened back in 1946 and remained so until his death in 1978. One of the track bookmakers in the sixties and seventies was the well-known celebrity show jumper Tommy Wade who rode Dundrum. John O'Flynn became Racing and General Manager and stayed with the track for twenty years continuing the long service record of its management. He saw the Bord na gCon buy a minority stake in the track from the Agricultural Society who use the fields at St James Park for agriculture events such as bull sales and show jumping.

In July 2007, the Bord na gCon put aside €8 million for a long-awaited regeneration project, the agreement between the Bord na gCon (IGB) and Agricultural Society would allow a new lease, demolition of the old structures and the building of a new grandstand. However the project did not go ahead and following much deliberation towards the end of 2008 it was decided that the financial position of Kilkenny made it no longer viable to operate.

After the meeting on 30 January 2009 the track closed its doors until further notice. However a group of local owners, breeders and supporters got together forming the Kilkenny Track Supporters Club and re-opened Kilkenny on 17 May 2009, they met with the IGB and agreed a funding policy and re-laid the entire track surface in addition to installing new rails and a new hare system.

Despite the small nature of the track it is regarded as an important contributor to the local economy and is still supported strongly by the same Kilkenny Track Supporters Club. The long running BEAM race nights have been a success for over 25 years. Tom Kinane arrived as General Manager and in recent years sponsorship was secured from Red Mills allowing the track to stage the Red Mills Unraced, Red Mills Juvenile and Langton Derby in addition to the prestigious McCalmont Cup.

In December 2023, the stadium renewed the contract agreement (as part of the GRI) with S.I.S for 2024.

== Competitions ==
- McCalmont Cup (current)
- Grand National (former)

== Track records ==
Current

| Yards | Greyhound | Time | Date | Notes |
|---|---|---|---|---|
| 300 | Ullid Conor | 15.99 | 12 September 2008 | |
| 325 | Ballygur Mike | 17.49 | 17 June 2009 | |
| 525 | Priceless Brandy | 28.46 | 17 June 2016 | |
| 550 | Dingo Will | 30.12 | 29 May 2016 | |
| 725 | Sparta Rocky | 40.07 | 27 September 2019 | |
| 970 | Hulkster | 56.88 | 18 June 2006 | |
| 1000 | Crackoftheash | 57.46 | 22 July 2012 | |
| 525 H | Comans Joe | 29.10 | 24 June 2007 | |

Former

| Yards | Greyhound | Time | Date | Notes |
|---|---|---|---|---|
| 300 | Veroden | 16.50 | 17 November 1961 | |
| 300 | Moygara Sligo | 16.50 | 2 June 1973 | |
| 300 | Margos Choice | 16.50 | 2 September 1977 | |
| 300 | Margos Choice | 16.50 | 7 April 1978 | |
| 300 | Roses Friend | 16.36 | 1988 | |
| 300 | Greyfriars Rose | 16.28 | 11 October 1989 | |
| 300 | Ballybray Jasper | 16.14 | 5 September 2001 | |
| 300 | Derwent Storm | 16.13 | 3 October 2003 | |
| 300 | Balerno Ron | 16.13 | 20 June 2004 | |
| 300 | Honcho's Pearl | 16.08 | 15 May 2004 | |
| 500 | Magic Hands | 28.30 | 25 May 1968 | |
| 525 | Clomoney Grand | 29.00 | 28 May 1966 | |
| 525 | Ballybeg Maid | 29.00 | 2 July 1975 | |
| 525 | Nameless Star | 29.00 | 23 July 1976 | |
| 525 | Lax Law | 28.98 | 21 September 1979 | |
| 525 | Spiral Nikita | 28.70 | 7 July 1996 | |
| 525 | Kilcarrig Zak | 28.69 | 20 June 2004 | |
| 525 | Boherduff Light | 28.53 | 3 September 2004 | |
| 525 | Boherduff Light | 28.49 | 10 September 2004 | |
| 550 | Clopook King | 31.50 | 10 July 1959 | |
| 550 | Welesbourne Dan | 30.25 | 11 September 2009 | |
| 700 | White Sails | 41.00 | 3 June 1966 | |
| 700 | The Knack | 40.85 | 1980 | |
| 700 | Ballyknock Amy | 40.65 | 13 August 1982 | |
| 700 | Deenside Mist | 40.47 | 5 July 1991 | |
| 700 | Penn Pepe | 40.45 | 4 July 1999 | |
| 700 | Coolavanny Bird | 40.37 | 11 July 2003 | |
| 700 | Smooth Slippy | 40.33 | 25 June 2004 | |
| 700 | Group Skater | 40.10 | 3 October 2008 | |
| 725 | Salacres Whyte | 42.35 | 21 June 2009 | |
| 725 | Kiltrea Brian | 40.31 | 9 July 2017 | |
| 745 | Summerhill Swift | 43.50 | 6 July 1997 | |
| 745 | Blue Boomer | 43.08 | 23 June 2002 | |
| 745 | Kilcloney Wine | 42.98 | 20 June 2004 | |
| 970 | Ballygalda Keri | 57.63 | 4 July 1999 | |
| 970 | Finuge Rumble | 57.41 | 22 June 2003 | |
| 1000 | Barrow Stamps | 58.33 | 21 June 2009 | |
| 300 H | Singing Border | 17.35 | 7 November 1952 | |
| 525 H | Tropical Splendour | 29.95 | 14 June 1961 | |
| 525 H | Sober Pride | 29.88 | 24 June 2001 | |
| 525 H | Debs The Best | 29.64 | 10 May 2002 | |
| 525 H | Dot Tom | 29.56 | 22 June 2003 | |
| 525 H | Bally Euro | 29.56 | 16 April 2004 | |
| 525 H | Comans Joe | 29.51 | 13 June 2007 | |
