= Somercotes Greyhound Stadium =

Sports venue in the UK

- Location: Nottingham Road, Somercotes, Derbyshire
- Coordinates: 53°05′04″N 1°22′19″W
- Opened: 1954
- Closed: 1971

Somercotes Greyhound Stadium was a greyhound racing stadium and former cricket ground site on Nottingham Road in Somercotes, Derbyshire.

== Origins ==
Somercotes Greyhound Stadium was constructed on the site of the Somercotes Cricket Ground. The cricket club had left the ground before the war.

== Opening ==
Harry Hill, Len Meredith, Ted Callaghan and Charlie Hall of the Alfreton and District Greyhound Company Limited owned the track and it opened in September 1954. The pavilion remained from the cricket days as part of the facilities and the local football team played on the inside field.

== History ==
The track was 370 yards in circumference and had race distances of 270 and 480 yards. The track was grass with sand and peat moss on the banked bends with an inside hare.

Racing was on Monday and Friday evenings with trials held after racing and the races consisted of both graded races and handicap races.

The racing was independent (not affiliated to the sports governing body the National Greyhound Racing Club).

== Closure ==
The stadium closed in 1971 and is now part of the NHS Distribution Service Depot.
