= 1954 English Greyhound Derby =

- Location: White City Stadium
- Start date: 12 June
- End date: 25 June
- Total prize money: £1,500 (winner)

The 1954 Greyhound Derby took place during June with the final being held on 25 June 1954 at White City Stadium. The winner was Pauls Fun and the winning owner Mr Thomas Henry Watford received £1,500.

== Final result ==
At White City (over 525 yards):

Position	Name of Greyhound	Breeding	Trap	SP	Time	Trainer
1st	Pauls Fun	Sandown Champion – All Fun	3	8-15f	28.84	Leslie Reynolds (Wembley)
2nd	Leafy Ash	Mad Tanist – Ash Shaggy	5	33-1	29.10	Jim Syder Jr. (Wembley)
3rd	Title Role	Celtic Chief – Coolkill Darkie	6	3-1	29.24	Jack Harvey (Wembley)
4th	Clever Count	Ballybeg Surprise – Wise Countess	1	33-1	29.64	Jack Harvey (Wembley)
5th	Ardskeagh Ville	Dante the Great – My Dreamland	2	100-8	29.70	Dave Barker (Catford)
6th	Ashcott Boy	Jeffs Pal – Winsome Complexion	4	100-7	00.00	Leslie Reynolds (Wembley)

=== Distances ===
3¼, 1¾, 5, ¾, Dis (lengths)
The distances between the greyhounds are in finishing order and shown in lengths. From 1950 one length was equal to 0.08 of one second.

== Semi finals ==
First Semi Final (19 June)
Pos	Name of Greyhound	SP	Time	Trainer
1st	Pauls Fun	4/6f	28.64 (TR)	Reynolds
2nd	Leafy Ash	33/1		Syder Jnr.
3rd	Ardskeagh Ville	5/1		Barker
4th	Barrowside	9/2		Harvey
5th	Rushton Spot	6/1		Johnson
6th	Something Odd	100/6		Geggus

Second Semi Final (19 June)
Pos	Name of Greyhound	SP	Time	Trainer
1st	Ashcott Boy	100/7	29.21	Reynolds
2nd	Title Role	4/11f		Harvey
3rd	Clever Count	100/6		Harvey
4th	Pancho Villa	10/1		Harvey
5th	Tolerton Ash	8/1		Perry
6th	Ahsha	100/6		Private

== Competition Report ==
Pauls Fun was bought by Mr Thomas Watford for £1,750 and put with Wembley trainer Leslie Reynolds in 1953 after he recorded the fastest ever time at Dunmore Park for a puppy. He was immediately installed as one of the favourites for the 1954 Derby and following a winters rest he opened up at 7-4f which was the shortest price ever recorded Derby ante-post price to date. During the first round heats a deluge of rain made the track very heavy and the best time recorded that night was 29.37 by Pauls Fun; next best was 29.67 by Title Role, thirty spots slower.

A tough second round draw pitted Barrowside trained by Jack Harvey alongside Pauls Fun; Barrowside a leading hurdler had gained entry into the Derby after winning the last trial stake. The race caused a surprise when Pauls Fun missed the break and Barrowside won comfortably. After the race Leslie Reynolds announced that Pauls Fun has tweaked a muscle and it would be a race against time to be fit for the semi-finals to be held just two days later.

Pauls Fun took his place in the semi-finals and won comfortably by six and a half-lengths setting a new track record of 28.64 in the process. Barrowside in the same heat failed to progress finishing in fourth place. Title Role at odds of 4-11 could only manage third after a crowded second semi-final race won by Ashcroft Boy.

Wembley once again accounted for five of the six finalists with just one hound from Catford, Ardskeagh Ville, the Gold Collar champion. The final proved to be a formality for Pauls Fun because a gap opened on the run up after Ashcott Boy drifted wide and he took advantage of it running out an easy victor. Ashcott Boy fell at the first bend and trailed in last. Leslie Reynolds had won a record fifth Derby, a feat not emulated until 57 years later.

== See also ==
1954 UK & Ireland Greyhound Racing Year
