= Cork Greyhound Stadium =

Former greyhound racing stadium in Cork, Ireland

- Location: Western Road, Cork, Munster
- Coordinates: 51°53′35.1″N 8°30′00.3″W
- Opened: 1936
- Closed: 2000

Cork Greyhound Stadium was a greyhound racing stadium on Western Road in Cork, Munster. It is not to be confused with Curraheen Park.

== Origins ==
The first greyhound track in Cork was known as The Show Grounds Greyhound Track and ran from 1928 to 1935 but closed on 20 September 1935, following the decision to relocate to a site nearer the city centre. The site chosen was between Western Road and the north bank of the River Lee near the Wellington Bridge.

== Opening ==
Less than one year after the closure of the circuit at the Showgrounds the second Cork track opened for business on 13 June 1936. Pat O'Brien was installed as the manager.

== History ==
The Irish provincial tracks pressured the Irish Coursing Club for the right to stage Ireland's premier event, the Irish Greyhound Derby which had been exclusively run in Dublin. During a vote in 1939 the club agreed to let Limerick host the race followed by Cork in 1941 but due to the Foot-and-mouth disease in 1941 racing had ceased and when the ban on racing was lifted Cork unfortunately ruled themselves out from being able to host the event at such short notice.

In 1942 the chance to hold the Derby was taken despite the fact that Cork could not match the prize money offered by the Dublin tracks. Record crowds attended the event won by Uacterlainn Riac. Cork never hosted the Derby again but in 1944 the Laurels was inaugurated at the track over 500 yards and would soon become a classic race.

The Oaks was held at the track twice in 1939 and 1943 and a competition originally named the Pegasus Cup was also introduced. The Pegasus Cup was renamed the Perpetual Challenge Trophy and later the Guinness Trophy. The Bord na gCon installed a new totalisator system at four tracks including Cork in 1960 and one year later the Laurels switched to the slightly longer distance of 525 yards. Laurels winners included Spanish Chestnut in 1949 and 1950 and the legendary Spanish Battleship won the competition in 1955. Cork bookmakers Liam Cashman sponsored the event for many years.

The Bord na gCon purchased the stadium in 1969, safeguarding the future of the track from redevelopment. The circumference of the track was 445 yards which consisted of race distances of 300, 310, 500, 525, 550, 70, 745 and 525 hurdles.

== Closure ==
By the late 1980s the facilities were struggling to cope with the large Cork attendances and the Bord na gCon sold the site of the greyhound track in Cork in 1996. They then purchased a green-field site in Curraheen on the western fringes of the city with the intention of building a brand new facility there. It took until the year 2000 for the Bord na gCon plans of a new track in Cork to come to fruition. The last meeting was held on Saturday 1 April 2000. The Western Road venue was redeveloped into the Western Gateway Building (science building of the University College Cork).

== Competitions ==
- Irish Laurels
- Oaks
- Irish Greyhound Derby

== Track records ==
Yards	Greyhound	Time (sec)	Date	Notes/ref
300	Lucky Blunder	16.60	29 July 1967	
300	Bunny Browney	16.50	6 September 1973	
300	Hidden Fortune	16.50	8 September 1973	
300	Moonshine Again	16.45	13 May 1978	
300	Ballygarvan What	=16.45	1981	
300	Odell Supreme	16.43	30 August 1986	
300	Sarahs Moth	16.35	29 September 1989	
300	Moyra Road	16.00	8 November 1995	
310	Blondsman	17.50	1950	
310	Odd Crest	17.20	8 August 1975	
500	Double Shadow	28.82	1950	
500	Spanish Battleship	28.30	29 August 1955	Irish Laurels first round
500	Last Lap	28.15	1960	
500	Prince of Bermuda	27.95	12 September 1956	
525	Clogher Cross	29.96	1950	
525	Socks On	29.64	May 1957	
525	Kilcaskin Kern	29.45	May 1957	
525	Dark Baby	29.40	1962	
525	Tanyard Heather	29.20	1964	
525	Wandering Sailor	=29.20	1970	
525	Ivy Hall Flash	29.10	29 October 1971	
525	Kilbracken Style	29.10	8 September 1973	
525	Allemaine	29.05	30 October 1978	
525	Knockrour Slave	29.00	30 August 1980	
525	Parkdown Jet	=29.00	1981	
525	The Stranger	28.95	4 September 1982	Irish Laurels Final
525	Airmount Grand	28.94	3 July 1989	Irish Laurels 2nd round
525	Airmount Grand	28.89	8 July 1989	Irish Laurels semi final
525	Airmount Grand	28.82	15 July 1989	Irish Laurels Final
525	Adraville Bridge	28.78	14 July 1990	Irish Laurels Final
525	Live Contender	28.50	17 November 1990	
550	Gorriencoona Border	31.40	Pre 1949	
550	Spanish Lad	31.00	7 October 1949	
700	Muskerry Cream	40.85	1950	
700	Lucky Break	40.00	30 May 1964	
700	Anner Duke	39.80	15 May 1982	
700	Kilcommon Cross	39.70	14 July 1990	
745	Pure Hand	43.00	19 May 1962	
745	Wings of the Morning	=43.00	23 June 1962	
745	Dempseys Glory	42.95	15 September 1973	
745	Experience	42.80	5 September 1981	
525 H	Deputy Lieutenant	30.74	1950	
525 H	Ashgrove Look	30.15	11 July 1966	
525 H	Race Riot	29.75	7 July 1973	
