= Harold's Cross Stadium =

Former greyhound racing stadium in Dublin, Ireland

Harold's Cross Greyhound Stadium
- Interactive map of Harold's Cross Greyhound Stadium
- Location: 6 Harold's Cross Road, Dublin, Ireland
- Coordinates: 53°19′26″N 6°16′36″W
- Operated by: Irish Greyhound Board
- Date opened: 1928
- Date closed: 13 February 2017
- Race type: greyhound racing

Harold's Cross Stadium was a greyhound racing stadium in Harold's Cross, Dublin, owned and operated by the Irish Greyhound Board.

Facilities included a grandstand restaurant, carvery, a number of bars, totalisator betting and seating.

Racing took place every Tuesday and Friday evening and race distances were 325, 525, 550, 570, and 750 yards and the feature competitions at the track were the Corn Cuchulainn, the Puppy Derby and the Grand National.

The stadium closed on 13 February 2017 due to the financial constraints of its owner, state greyhound racing body Bord na gCon. Bord na gCon later sold the track to the Department of Education for €23 million in 2018 and apartments have also been built on the site. The proceeds from the sale were proposed be used to help pay a €20.3 million debt incurred from the construction of Limerick Greyhound Stadium.

== Football ==
The stadium was used over the years by five football teams who were competing in the League of Ireland:

- Brideville played there for eleven seasons from 1929/30-1931/32 and from 1935/36-1942/43
- Dolphins F.C. played there for two seasons; 1932–33 and 1933–34.
- Transport F.C. played there for eleven seasons, from 1951–52 until 1961–62.
- Shelbourne played at the stadium from 1975–76 to 1976–77 and again from 1982–83 to 1988–89 before moving to Tolka Park.
- St Patrick's Athletic were the last League of Ireland club to play there regularly, from 1989–90 up to November 1993, while work was being done to its Richmond Park home.

Harold's Cross has hosted a number of notable matches. It staged one League of Ireland Cup Final when Limerick City beat St. Patrick's Athletic 2–0 in the 1992/93 decider, whilst the last League of Ireland match ever played in Harold's Cross was a home match for Galway United. On the final weekend of the 1993/94 season, there was no available pitch in Galway due to persistent torrential rain for their match with Shelbourne so the game was switched to Harold's Cross. Shels won the match 5–2 with Barry O'Connor grabbing a hat-trick.

== Speedway ==
The stadium was used for speedway racing in 1928.

== Greyhound racing ==
=== Origins and opening ===
On 13 February 1928 a new Irish company was registered called the Dublin Greyhound and Sports Association Ltd. The nominal capital was £25,000 in shares of £1 and the directors were J.B Fraser a timber merchant, John J Flood (retired public official), Walter Butler (architect), Edward Teehan (gentleman) and John McEntagart (motor engineer). Together they would introduce the second greyhound racing track to Dublin in the form of Harold's Cross close to the centre of Dublin (the first was Shelbourne Park).

It became the third greyhound racing venue in Ireland following Shelbourne Park and Celtic Park in Belfast. The opening night was on 10 April 1928 with the first race scheduled for 8 pm. The Irish Times advertised the fact that there was accommodation for 40,000 people and car parking for 1,000 cars. The Riordan family formed the first management with John superseded by his son John F.

In 1928 Harolds Cross introduced a competition that would become the modern day Irish Greyhound Derby, the race was unofficial because Harolds Cross decided to run this 'National Derby' without consulting the Irish racing fraternity. This was a practice they would continue to do until the formation of classic races in 1932.

=== Pre-war history ===
In 1929 Mick the Miller won the Spring Cup competition here over 525 yards and then finished runner up in the Stayers Cup over 600 yards. The Irish Coursing Club issued a new list of classic races in 1932 and controversy followed because Harolds Cross was given the Oaks and not the Derby. Shelbourne had been given the premier event which did not go down well based on the fact that they had introduced the event. One year later and Harolds Cross were furious that Shelbourne were issued the race again. In a meeting Mr Tynan representing the track, had pointed out that the previous year Paddy O’Donoghue had promised that they could hold the event in 1933. I.C.C chairman John Bruton explained that they could not cancel a ruling by the club already made. Tynan stormed out and Harolds Cross refused to run any classics or their qualifying races and threatened to run their own Irish Championship. Finally in 1934 they were granted permission to run the Derby as long as they contributed a minimum of £100 towards the event. The ICC added a further £50 and it was also agreed that Shelbourne and Harolds Cross would run the competition in alternate years.

The first star of the track was a black bitch called Nanny Goosegog owned by the legendary Arthur Doc Callanan who happened to be the track vet as well in the early days of racing at Harolds Cross. The March 1938 whelp won 37 of her 38 races at the Harolds Cross but because some of these were handicap races the bitch did not set any official records. After 20 consecutive wins she was beaten by Lucky House who received 11 yards, another 17 consecutive victories followed so it is easy to see why she was Dublin's first superstar.

In 1943 the Puppy Derby was inaugurated here. One year later the track became the first in Ireland to introduce automatic starting traps. 'Doc' Callanan had suffered from ill health in 1945 and died aged 51; Harolds Cross introduced a race in his memory called the Callanan Cup.

=== Post-war history ===
Spanish Battleship won the first and last of his Derby titles in 1953 and 1955 respectively and the 1955 edition saw the stadium overwhelmed by crowds attempting to get a look at final.

The Bord na gCon funded a new totalisator system at the track in 1960. The Derby was last run at the track in 1967, when it was won by Russian Gun. Rumours had surfaced that developers might purchase the track so the Irish Greyhound Board acted quickly and bought Harolds Cross in 1970 to quash any future re-development plans.

The Corn Cuchulainn for stayers was another major event introduced to the track in 1961 and in 1977 the track went ahead with considerable improvements that included a new stand, restaurant and other facilities. The 1978 running of the Callanan Cup and Oaks did not take place at the Cross with the latter switching to Shelbourne. Stability followed with established races taking centre stage except for the Oaks which would eventually be held at Shelbourne permanently. George Deegan became Racing Manager as the track raced on Tuesday, Thursday and Saturday nights.

Despite the stadium being in the hands of the Irish Greyhound Board and Racing Manager Deegan providing security with his long tenure the Dublin track was subject once again to rumours in the early nineties. There were strong indications coming from some quarters that Harolds Cross would close to ease the burden of costs on the IGB. Luckily business began to grow after a tough period of trading and the rumours went away. The Grand National had been held here since 2001, the second time the track has hosted the event following the previous spell during the 1930s.

In 2010 Racing Manager Billy Bell decided to join Mullingar Greyhound Stadium as their Racing Manager leaving Harolds Cross looking for a replacement. Coincidentally Derek Frehill (part of the Mullingar management & former RM there) was the one to fill the gap switching paces when Bell left. The trading of places took place after the Puppy Derby final.

=== Sale ===
Towards the end of 2014 the Irish Greyhound Board decided to sell the stadium. It was considered that by doing so the debts of the IGB could be drastically reduced. The idea was to transfer all Dublin operations to Shelbourne Park but the decision did not sit well with those involved with Harolds Cross and many others in Irish racing. Even some at Shelbourne expressed concern that they relied on Harolds Cross as a feeder stadium.

The move was confirmed on 13 February 2017, and all IGB operations have since ceased.

=== Competitions ===
- Corn Cuchulainn
- Puppy Derby
- Grand National
- Irish Greyhound Derby
- Oaks
- Callanan Cup

=== Track records ===
At closing

Yards	Greyhound	Time (sec)	Date	Notes/ref
325	Staley Vegas	17.16	2 September 2005	
330	Quarter to Five	17.52	9 April 1999	
525	Airport Express	28.15	21 September 2001	
550	Quattro Power	29.65	6 July 2001	
570	Kiltrea Kev	30.94	19 December 2009	
575	Serene Rumble	30.83	24 November 2002	
750	Roxholme Girl	41.45	24 June 2005	
810	Hovex Brandy	45.17	28 May 2010	
830	Brookdale Lady	46.72	23 June 1995	
1010	Flying Winner	56.82	19 December 2008	
1015	Group Special	58.32	10 January 2003	
525 H	Toomaline Jack	28.68	23 October 2009	
570 H	Druids Forrest	32.66	26 May 2006	
575 H	Lemon Rambo	32.43	25 February 2005	

Former

Yards	Greyhound	Time (sec)	Date	Notes/Ref
325	Ballinclea Dancer	18.30	1955	
325	The Mall	18.26	26 September 1958	
325	Sporting Huzzar	17.24	16 November 2001	
325	Dalcash Black	17.20	28 November 2003	
330	Gortnaclohy Mover	18.30	1970	
330	Toms Pal	18.28	19 November 1971	
330	Kojak		15 April 1976	
330	Bray Vale	17.76	21 July 1978	
330	Ballyoughter Lad	17.72	5 April 1991	
350	Count Cure	19.70	1941	
350	Roseide Ilene	19.69	11 September 1941	
350	Sky Patrol	19.50	1950	
480	Nelson Pillar	26.80	26 April 1968	
500	Fawn Cherry	28.36	29 October 1943	Irish Puppy Derby final
500	Shaggy Lad	27.96	17 October 1945	Irish Puppy Derby semi final
525	Mad Tanist	29.91	27 July 1945	
525	Astra	29.88	2 August 1945	
525	Baytown Ivy	29.87	1946	
525	Cold Christmas	29.86	1946	
525	Friends Everywhere	29.74	1949	
525	Baytown Brunette	29.66	29 May 1951	Callanan Cup 2nd Rd
525	Carmodys Tanist	29.64	17 August 1951	Irish Derby Final
525	Spanish Battleship	29.53	1955	
525	Noisy Sam	29.41	30 July 1957	Irish Derby 2nd Rd
525	Clomoney Grand	29.03	29 April 1966	
525	Romping To Work	28.86	14 September 1973	Irish Oaks heats
525	Pulse Tube	28.78	6 June 1985	
525	Wheres Carmel	28.78	28 June 1985	
525	Droopys Vieri	28.20	8 September 2000	
550	Mile Bush Pat	30.75	12 June 1964	
550	Seskin Mist	30.75	28 June 1968	=equalled
550	Move First	30.48	25 July 1975	
550	Son of Silver	30.46	13 July 1984	
550	Commache Run	30.46	8 May 1987	
550	Barefoot Band	30.44	17 November 1989	
550	Barneys Alarm	30.20	2 August 1991	
570	Greenwell Flash	31.02	30 September 2005	
570	Analyse	31.01	15 December 2006	
570	Springmount Loco	30.97	14 November 2008	
570	Ballyard Timmy	30.97	2 October 2009	
575	Veras Rovey	31.13	16 November 2001	
575	Unsinkable Boxer	31.12	9 August 2002	
580	Dee Diabolo	33.35	1950	
580	King Niall	32.62	1962	
580	Hurry Guy	32.30	4 July 1968	
580	Rail Ship	31.82	21 September 1973	
580	Treacys Triumph	31.68	October 1995	
600	Yardley Whistler	34.00	1946	
600	Mad Astley	33.80	1954	
750	Soaring Leary	45.30	1950	
750	Chieftain's Envoy	42.70	1964	Corn Cuchulainn final
750	Westpark Quail	42.42	1965	Corn Cuchulainn final
750	Ballybeg Pride	42.15	23 July 1968	
750	Rita's Choice	42.10	8 June 1973	
750	Azuri	42.00	24 June 1983	
750	Making Merry	41.58	12 October 2001	
810	Recovery Mission	45.35	17 October 2003	
810	Ferdia Bound	45.23	6 November 2009	
830	Ballygall Point	47.32	14 April 1978	
830	Donore Boy	47.00	4 July 1986	
1010	Ericas Equity	57.88	19 September 2003	
1010	Air Force Honcho	57.76	3 December 2004	
1010	Debidee Lane	57.68	23 December 2005	
1010	Flying Winner	58.67	5 December 2008	
1015	I'm A Copper	58.58	4 July 1986	
1015	Bongo Squaw	58.37	25 September 2000	
1025	Bodies Lisa	59.52	4 December 1992	
350 H	Printer	20.36	1950	
500 H	Inly	30.08	1950	
525 H	General Kildare	30.72	1950	
525 H	Make Sure	30.65	13 July 1961	
525 H	Ross River Skip	30.14	25 April 1975	
525 H	Ivys Fantasy	30.14	2 September 1975	
525 H	Keeragh Sambo	29.90	1975	
525 H	Ring Gortnadi	29.78	12 September 1986	
525 H	Run On Tar	29.52	20 March 1990	
525 H	Debs The Best	29.19	3 December 2001	
525 H	Selby Ben	29.19	6 October 2003	
525 H	Jimmy The Lad	29.18	1 October 2004	
525 H	Distant Legend	29.09	24 October 2008	
575 H	Kikis First	32.58	17 October 2003	
575 H	Honcho Belle	32.54	11 February 2005	
580 H	Druze	34.73	1950	
580 H	Dark Cowboy	32.88	16 May 1975	
