= 1971 UK & Ireland Greyhound Racing Year =

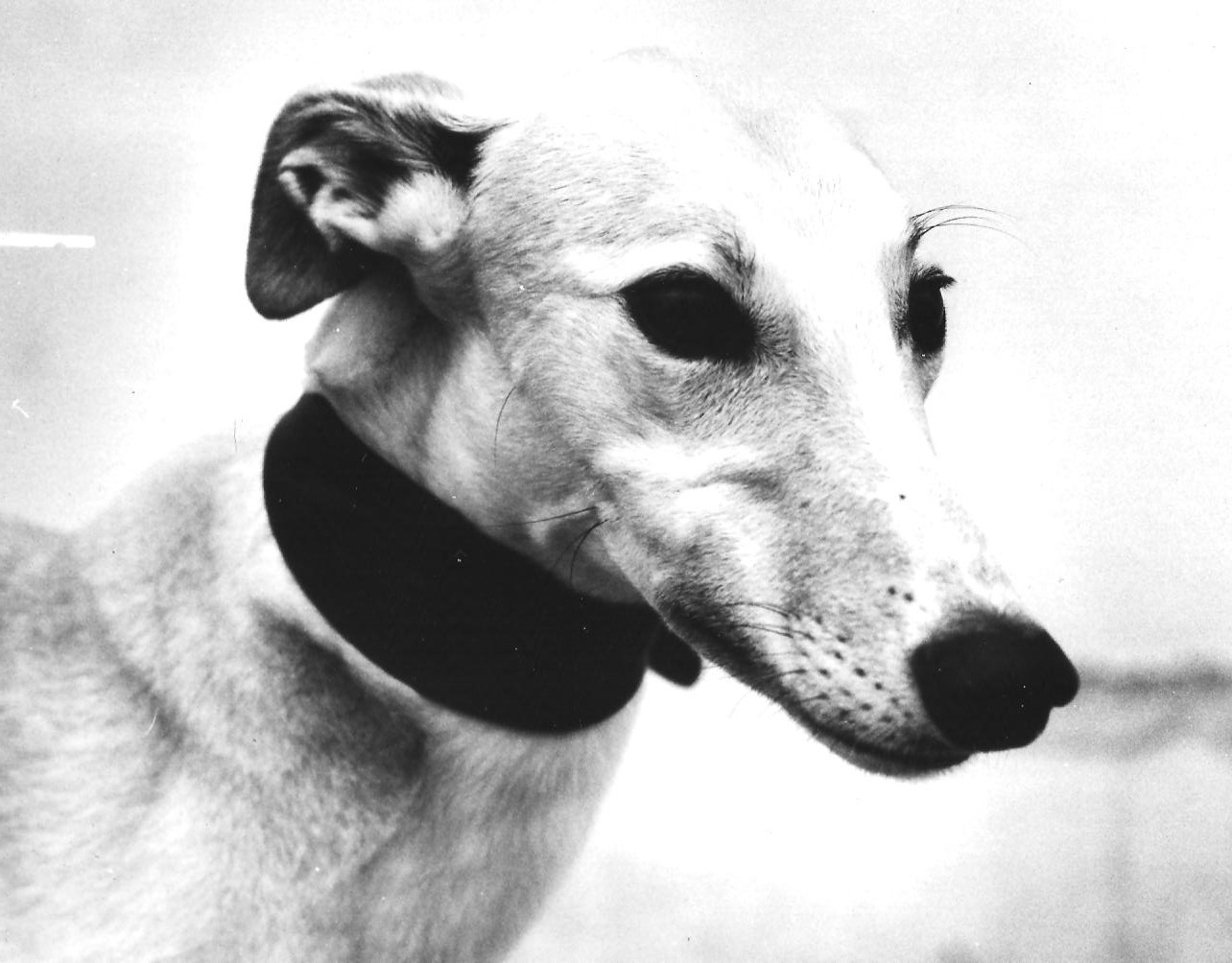
- Oaks champion Short Cake

The 1971 UK & Ireland Greyhound Racing Year was the 46th year of greyhound racing in the United Kingdom and the 45th year of greyhound racing in Ireland.

== Roll of honour ==
Major Winners
Award	Name of Winner
1971 English Greyhound Derby	Dolores Rocket
1971 Irish Greyhound Derby	Sole Aim
1971 Scottish Greyhound Derby	Not held
1971 Welsh Greyhound Derby	Spectres Dream
Greyhound Trainer of the Year	Herbert White
Greyhound of the Year	Dolores Rocket
Irish Greyhound of the Year	Ivy Hall Flash

== Summary ==
The annual National Greyhound Racing Club (NGRC) returns were released, with totalisator turnover at £56,188,971 and attendances recorded at 7,119,398 from 5808 meetings.

Dolores Rocket was Greyhound of the Year after winning the English Greyhound Derby at White City and St Leger at Wembley. Her performances shone through during a difficult year that saw the closure of four tracks. The tracks were Kings Heath Stadium, which had only just recently been purchased by the Greyhound Racing Association (GRA) under their GRA Property Trust, Charlton Stadium (also GRA), the City Stadium, Norwich and Houghton Stadium in Durham.

== Tracks ==
Hendon was the first track to declare decimal dividends and Milton Keynes (known as Bletchley or the Groveway) switched from independent status to full NGRC status.

== Competitions ==
Following the closure of Charlton, three events came to an end. The Olympic would return in 1979 at Brighton and the Greenwich Cup was moved to Catford but the Cloth of Gold was discontinued. The Welsh Greyhound Derby at Cardiff Arms Park and the Grand Prix at Walthamstow were given the overdue status of being an official classic status competition, by the NGRC.

The Eclipse was switched to Hall Green for a two-year period.

Sherrys Prince successfully defended his Grand National, breaking the track record twice, first recording 29.26 seconds in the heats and then 29.20 in the semi-finals. The only other greyhounds that had achieved double Grand National glory were Juvenile Classic (1940) and Blossom of Annagura (1950). Dolores Rocket won the Spring Cup over 700 yards at Wimbledon and set a track record at Crayford before victory in the Wembley Spring Cup.

Don't Gambol won a second successive Scurry Gold Cup at Clapton and in the year ending annual Duke of Edinburgh Cup, Leeds provided a shock by reaching the final and beating Clapton to lift the trophy.

== News ==
A change in the betting laws allowed tracks to hold an extra 26 race meetings per year. Crayford & Bexleyheath Stadium was the latest track to change to a contract trainer system, which led to Henry Parson's 33-year training career coming to an end after he joined the racing office. Slough and Reading followed suit soon after. Another trainer Stan Gray also retired after 35 years at Southend and Frank Melville left Rochester Stadium for Harringay Stadium, Melville was replaced by Jimmy Keane.

The demise of the GRA Kings Heath Stadium kennels in addition to the demolition of the Hall Green kennels, meant that the two remaining Birmingham GRA kennel trainers, Eric O'Connor and Peter Harding, were relocated to Powderhall. The Edinburgh track also brought in contract trainers as well (some from Kings Heath). Hall Green Racing Manager Sid Wood moved to Belle Vue Stadium and Bob Rowe (son of Leicester Racing Manager John Rowe) filled the position at Hall Green.

The experiment by GRA to introduce eight dog races continued with trials at Harringay and races at Belle Vue and White City Stadium (Manchester). The Northern Flat took place as an eight dog competition, the first major event to do so. Trainers were also allowed to seed their greyhounds wide for the first time.

== Ireland ==
In Ireland the Bord na gCon introduced drug testing for the first time. Sole Aim was a rare English winner of the 1971 Irish Greyhound Derby which featured one of strongest entries for years.

The Bord na gCon introduced drugs testing for the first time and experiment with the procedures at Shelbourne Park.

Blissful Pride trained by Leslie Mcnair wins his 18th race from 19 starts following victory in the Anglo-Irish International at White City. The Irish star also won the Irish Oaks.

== Principal UK races ==
Grand National, White City (April 17 525y h, £500)
Pos	Name of Greyhound	Trainer	SP	Time	Trap
1st	Sherrys Prince	Colin West	1-3f	29.22	6
2nd	Afore You Go	Randy Singleton	4-1	29.32	3
3rd	Adamstown Valley	Joe Pickering	9-1	29.72	5
4th	Faythe Man		16-1	30.20	1
5th	Yankalife		50-1	30.28	4
6th	Rogley Sundown	Joe Pickering	50-1	30.40	2

Oaks, Harringay (May 14, 525y, £1,000)
Pos	Name of Greyhound	Trainer	SP	Time	Trap
1st	Short Cake	David Geggus	5-1	28.98	4
2nd	Leap And Run	John Bassett	7-1	29.01	6
3rd	Drive On	Tom Johnston Jr.	5-1	29.19	3
4th	Miss Finch		10-3	29.23	2
5th	Wee Garryduff	Vicky Holloway	6-1	29.35	1
6th	Pallas Daisy	Bill Adams	6-4f	29.49	5

Gold Collar, Catford (May 15, 570y, £1,500)
Pos	Name of Greyhound	Trainer	SP	Time	Trap
1st	Down Your Way	Freddie Warrell	5-2	33.10	4
2nd	Spectre Jockey	David Power	2-1f	33.22	3
3rd	Puff Pastry	Sid Ryall	7-1	33.66	5
4th	Spotted Rory	Paddy McEllistrim	9-4	34.00	6
5th	Michaels Bar	Phil Rees Sr.	16-1	34.42	1
6th	Mind Out		25-1	34.66	2

The Grand Prix, Walthamstow (May 25, 600y, £1,500)
Pos	Name of Greyhound	Trainer	SP	Time	Trap
1st	Breach's Buzzard	Colin McNally	4-5f	40.00	5
2nd	Baton	Jack Durkin	8-1	40.24	6
3rd	Commutering	Frank Melville	5-1	40.36	4
4th	Keen Rebel		4-1	40.48	1
5th	Breachs Buster	Reg Young	12-1	40.64	2
6th	Step Out		20-1	41.04	3

Welsh Derby, Arms Park (Jul 3, 525y £755)
Pos	Name of Greyhound	Trainer	SP	Time	Trap
1st	Spectres Dream	Hugo Spencer	16-1	29.22	4
2nd	Royal Reward		7-1	29.38	6
3rd	Micks Pride	Bob Burls	9-4	30.02	1
4th	Keen Santa		16-1	30.14	5
5th	Mona Movealong	George Curtis	10-1	30.20	2
6th	King Lester	Joe Pickering	4-5f	30.68	3

Scurry Gold Cup, Clapton (Jul 10, 400y £1,000)
Pos	Name of Greyhound	Trainer	SP	Time	Trap
1st	Don't Gambol	Paddy McEvoy	4-11f	22.73	5
2nd	One Lost Day	Paddy McEvoy	11-2	22.87	2
3rd	Banogue Tom	Pam Heasman	33-1	23.21	4
4th	Kinloch Jewel	Jim Hookway	33-1	23.31	1
5th	Idle Thought		3-1	23.32	3
6th	Alluvion	Bill Kelly	20-1	23.40	6

St Leger, Wembley (Aug 23, 700y, £1,500)
Pos	Name of Greyhound	Trainer	SP	Time	Trap
1st	Dolores Rocket	Herbert White	1-2f	40.03	1
2nd	Spectre Jockey	David Power	8-1	40.15	4
3rd	Shyan Darling	Miss M.Casey	4-1	40.39	6
4th	Laura Gay	Barbara Brockhouse	25-1	40.49	2
5th	Knock Off	Harry Bamford	5-1	40.65	3
6th	Todos Kingpin	Jack Durkin	40-1	40.97	5

Laurels, Wimbledon (Sep 10, 500y, £5,000)
Pos	Name of Greyhound	Trainer	SP	Time	Trap
1st	Black Andrew	Randy Singleton	11-2	27.96	2
2nd	Spectres Dream	Hugo Spencer	25-1	28.10	3
3rd	Eleventh Wonder		6-1	28.18	6
4th	Supreme Fun	Sid Ryall	5-4f	28.20	5
5th	Sandy Desert	Paddy McEvoy	10-1	00.00	4
6th	Dactars Speed	Stan Martin	9-4	00.00	1

Cesarewitch, West Ham (Oct 1, 600y, £1,500)
Pos	Name of Greyhound	Trainer	SP	Time	Trap
1st	Whisper Billy	Charlie Coyle	50-1	33.45	1
2nd	Rosemount Gunner	Bob Burls	33-1	33.48	2
3rd	Shyan Darling	Dave Geggus	8-1	33.56	4
4th	Merry Colonel	Tom Johnston Jr.	8-1	33.64	5
5th	Supreme Fun	Sid Ryall	6-4f	33.65	6
6th	Dolores Rocket	Herbert White	11-10f	34.05	3

== Totalisator returns ==
Extended content

The totalisator returns declared to the licensing authorities for the year 1971 are listed below.

Stadium	Turnover £
London (White City)	6,287,878
London (Wimbledon)	3,768,449
London (Harringay)	3,574,423
London (Walthamstow)	2,932,233
London (Wembley)	2,560,469
London (Catford)	2,301,796
Manchester (Belle Vue)	1,904,347
London (Clapton)	1,720,176
Romford	1,700,672
London (West Ham)	1,674,667
Edinburgh (Powderhall)	1,517,717
Birmingham (Hall Green)	1,362,277
Brighton & Hove	1,265,479
Manchester (White City)	1,200,428
Birmingham (Perry Barr, old)	1,113,114
Newcastle (Brough Park)	1,112,671
Crayford & Bexleyheath	1,096,819
Glasgow (Shawfield)	967,230

Stadium	Turnover £
Slough	953,856
Leeds (Elland Road)	908,150
Southend-on-Sea	895,601
London (Charlton)	847,403
Wolverhampton (Monmore)	814,167
Sheffield (Owlerton)	808,247
London (Hackney)	732,880
Bristol (Eastville)	700,500
London (Hendon)	675,692
Gloucester & Cheltenham	674,521
Newcastle (Gosforth)	623,757
Glasgow (White City)	621,898
Manchester (Salford)	589,134
Willenhall	572,990
Derby	541,628
Cardiff (Arms Park)	525,511
Rochester & Chatham	462,786
Poole	458,512

Stadium	Turnover £
Liverpool (White City)	455,876
Ramsgate (Dumpton Park)	443,434
Oxford	409,444
Reading (Oxford Road)	407,451
Portsmouth	351,230
Cradley Heath	347,657
Glasgow (Carntyne)	292,160
Middlesbrough	287,505
Rayleigh (Essex)	276,838
Leicester (Blackbird Rd)	274,485
Hull (Old Craven Park)	248,472
Preston	242,124
Wakefield	206,653
Swindon	199,620
Birmingham (Kings Heath)	117,781
Norwich (City)	109,336
Milton Keynes	50,827
