= 2018 UK & Ireland Greyhound Racing Year =

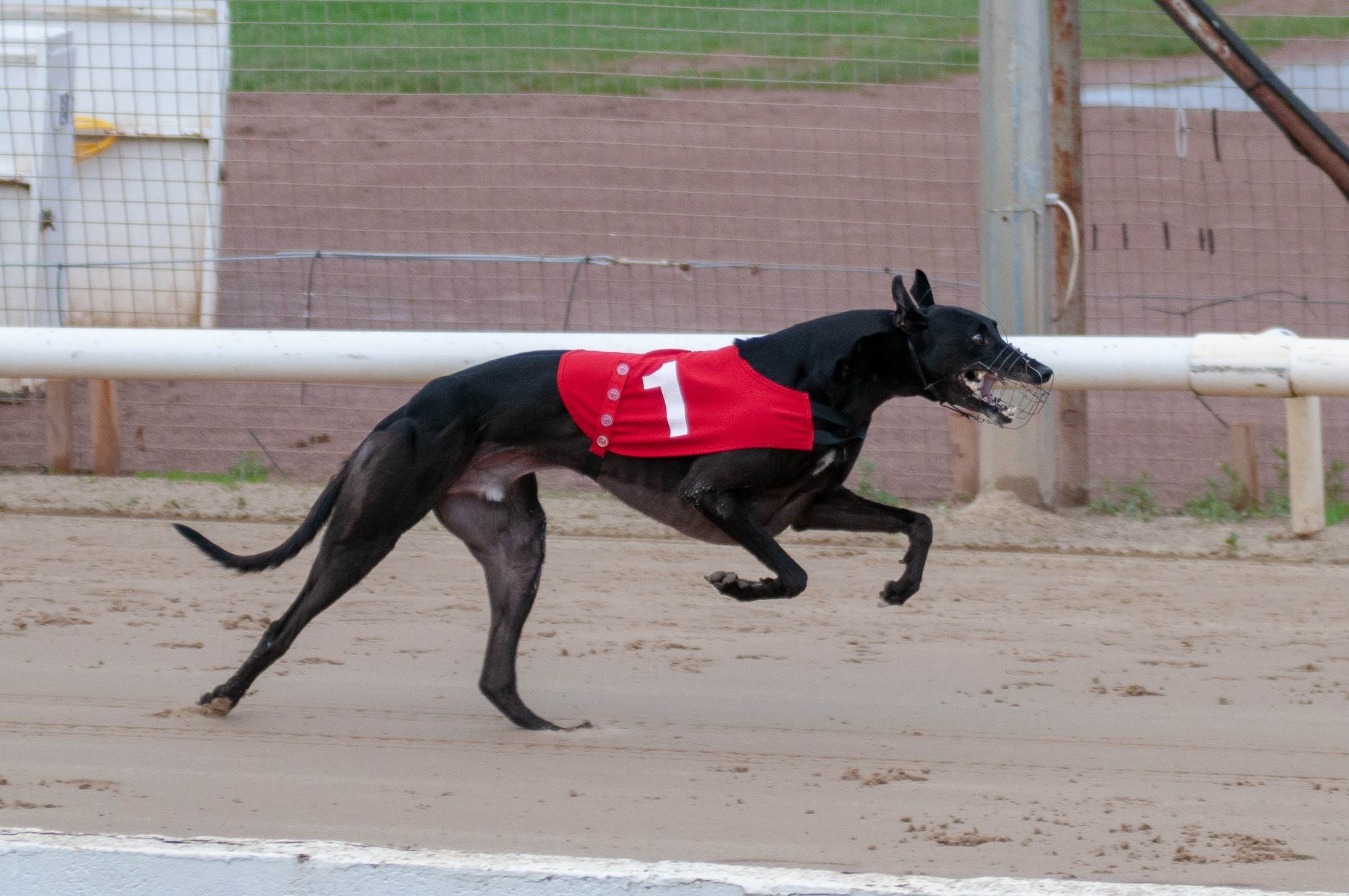
- Dorotas Wildcat, the English Greyhound Derby champion

2018 UK & Ireland Greyhound Racing Year was the 93rd year of greyhound racing in the United Kingdom and the 92nd year of greyhound racing in Ireland.

== Roll of honour ==
Major Winners
Award	Name of Winner
2018 English Greyhound Derby	Dorotas Wildcat (Kevin Hutton)
2018 Irish Greyhound Derby	Ballyanne Sim (James Robinson)
Greyhound Trainer of the Year	Mark Wallis
UK Greyhound of the Year	Dorotas Wildcat
Irish Greyhound of the Year	Ballyanne Sim

Gain GTA Trainers Championship, (Towcester) (21 Apr)
Pos	Name of Trainer	Points
1st	Mark Wallis	59
2nd	Kevin Hutton	45
3rd	Liz McNair	42
4th	Paul Young	34
5th	Patrick Janssens	27
6th	Seamus Cahill	17

== Summary ==
The year revolved around two major events, the first was the ongoing battle for broadcasting rights between Satellite Information Services (SIS) and the Arena Racing Company (ARC). The second was the devastating news that Towcester racecourse, headed by Lord Hesketh was put into administration. On 23 August KPMG were appointed as administrators and 134 out of 137 members of staff at the racecourse were made redundant, many having to claim statutory redundancy from the government. The last greyhound meeting was on 12 August.

On 13 November it was announced by the administrators that the racecourse's assets were being sold to a company called Fermor Land LLP. This company was formed on 18 October (26 days before the sale) and is headed by Lord Hesketh's brother-in-law Mark Westropp, a trustee of the Hesketh Family trusts.

Dorotas Wildcat won the last Derby at Towcester and then following a rest came back to win the Eclipse in late November. The Kevin Hutton trained black dog was the first Derby champion to win a competition (post Derby) since Taylors Sky in 2011.

== News ==
On 9 April bookmakers and betting exchanges informed the Department for Digital, Culture, Media and Sport whether they were going to contribute to the British Greyhound Racing Fund. The fund, which is pivotal for the welfare of greyhounds involved in Greyhound Board of Great Britain licensed racing, is voluntary and based on the profits. Betfair and Sky Betting & Gaming were the high-profile companies that refused to contribute, which attracted criticism from the industry. One month later, on 17 May, it was announced by Culture Secretary Matt Hancock that betting stakes on fixed-odds betting terminals (known as FOBTs) would be reduced to a £2 maximum. Consequently, income generated by betting shops could reduce, which could affect the general health of both the horse racing and greyhound racing industries and lead to an uncertain period ahead.

Eight ex-Towcester trainers joined Henlow, including Mark Wallis and Nick Savva while Kevin Hutton joined Monmore and Patrick Janssens joined Central Park Stadium. Wallis would go on to extend his record number of wins as Greyhound Trainer of the Year by securing a tenth success and a seventh in succession despite a late challenge from Kevin Hutton.

John Gilburn died after a heart attack aged 65, the Sheffield director was an extremely popular figure within the industry. Former BGRB Chief Executive Geoffrey Thomas also died, he was best known for the 'New Deal', a failed attempt in 2002 to gain a better deal for the tracks from the bookmakers.

== Tracks ==
Mildenhall Stadium closed to greyhound racing on 15 January following the ongoing problems experienced by the track, leaving 22 registered stadia with the Greyhound Board of Great Britain. The proposed Swindon development showed no further progress in relation to a new track layout, new housing now bordered the existing track and it had now passed the three year mark since Clarke Osborne (MD) had informed the greyhound connections that work was due to start.

== Competitions ==
Mark Wallis won a third Trainers Championship stopping Kevin Hutton from winning a fourth consecutive title. The Other Reg secured the Scottish Greyhound Derby title. Hutton then made amends by winning his first Derby title with Dorotas Wildcat.

As a result of the Towcester administration three major events, the ECC Timber Puppy Derby, the Oaks and the TV Trophy were left uncontested in the racing schedule. The rights for the TV Trophy held by Greyhound Board of Great Britain was rescheduled for Crayford in December. Both the Oaks and Puppy Derby received new homes in Swindon and Henlow respectively.

=== Principal UK finals ===
Ladbrokes Golden Jacket, Crayford (27 Feb, 714m, £17,500)
Pos	Name of Greyhound	Trap	SP	Time	Trainer
1st	Shotgun Bullet	3	5-4f	44.95	Derek Knight
2nd	Mrs Roo	4	9-2	45.25	Simon Harms
3rd	Rubys Rascal	1	4-1	45.45	Mark Wallis
4th	Goldies Hotspur	6	9-2	45.57	Patrick Janssens
5th	Piemans Jet	5	14-1	45.67	David Mullins
6th	Cincinnati	2	7-1	45.91	Mark Wallis

Racing Post Scottish Derby, Shawfield (14 April, 480m, £20,000)
Pos	Name of Greyhound	Trap	SP	Time	Trainer
1st	The Other Reg	4	5-2	28.87	Pat Rosney
2nd	Dropzone	5	8-1	29.01	Elaine Parker
3rd	Borna Account	3	4-1	29.05	Pat Buckley
4th	Lightfoot King	6	5-1	29.08	Elaine Parker
5th	Dorotas Vic	1	6-4f	29.16	Charlie Lister OBE
6th	Black Farren	2	5-1	29.24	Mark Wallis

John Smith's Grand National, Central Park (27 April, 480mH, £8,000)
Pos	Name of Greyhound	Trap	SP	Time	Trainer
1st	Parkers Dynamite	3	7-4	29.46	Mark Wallis
2nd	Razldazl Raidio	5	5-4f	29.90	Ricky Holloway
3rd	Barricane Jack	2	12-1	30.02	Ricky Holloway
4th	Young Coumbus	1	33-1	30.16	Paul Young
5th	Swift Dartmoor	4	8-1	30.20	Mark Wallis
6th	The Alickadoo	6	8-1	30.36	Barry O'Sullivan

William Hill Grand Prix, Sunderland (18 Jul, 640m, £15,000)
Pos	Name of Greyhound	Trap	SP	Time	Trainer
1st	Bombers Bullet	4	9-4	39.10	Mark Wallis
2nd	Swift Hansel	3	10-1	39.13	Anneliese Thompson
3rd	Donation	6	5-1	39.14	Heather Dimmock
4th	Lightfoot King	2	6-4f	39.36	Elaine Parker
5th	Looking Sharp	1	12-1	39.58	Pat Rosney
6th	Ballymac Twitter	5	4-1	40.08	Kelly Macari

William Hill Classic, Sunderland (18 Jul, 450m, £25,000)
Pos	Name of Greyhound	Trap	SP	Time	Trainer
1st	Allowdale Bruno	6	10-1	26.75	Harry Williams
2nd	Bubbly Bluebird	4	5-1	26.94	Paul Young
3rd	King Elvis	3	1-1jf	27.16	Liz McNair
4th	Holdem Zidane	5	20-1	27.20	Carol Weatherall
5th	King Turbo	1	1-1jf	27.37	Liz McNair
6th	Azzurri Genesis	2	14-1	27.41	Pat Rosney

RPGTV East Anglian Derby, Yarmouth (20 Sep, 462m, £15,000)
Pos	Name of Greyhound	Trap	SP	Time	Trainer
1st	Affane Party	3	9-4	27.32	John Lambe
2nd	Seaglass Phantom	4	6-1	27.59	Patrick Janssens
3rd	King Elvis	6	2-1f	27.88	Liz McNair
4th	Kilmore Lemon	5	7-2	27.98	Patrick Janssens
5th	Dog Mac Arthure	2	12-1	28.01	David Pruhs
6th	Bubbly Bluebird	1	13-2	28.16	Paul Young

GRA St Leger, Perry Barr (17 Nov, 710m, £5,500)
Pos	Name of Greyhound	Trap	SP	Time	Trainer
1st	Calico Ranger	6	9-4	43.09	Carol Weatherall
2nd	Slippy Maggie	4	5-2	43.15	Hazel Kemp
3rd	Ridgedale Gold	1	7-1	43.51	Phil Simmonds
4th	Minnies Highway	3	12-1	43.53	John Mullins
5th	Token Memory	2	20-1	43.59	Ian Bradford
6th	Magical Icarus	5	11-8f	43.71	David Jeans

Ladbrokes TV Trophy, Crayford (8 Dec, 874m, £9,000)
Pos	Name of Greyhound	Trap	SP	Time	Trainer
1st	Savana Winner	4	4-1	56.87	Diane Henry
2nd	Goldies Hotspur	5	7-1	56.95	Patrick Janssens
3rd	Tellhersomething	6	20-1	56.97	John Blencowe
4th	Slippy Maggie	2	6-4jf	57.19	Hazel Kemp
5th	Maireads Ivy	1	6-4jf	57.20	Derek Knight
6th	Slippy Maska	3	50-1	57.92	Hazel Kemp

Conlon Family and Pin-Point Recruitment Laurels, Newcastle (13 Dec, 480m, £5,000)
Pos	Name of Greyhound	Trap	SP	Time	Trainer
1st	Nadurra Ross	1	5-1	28.46	John McLachlan
2nd	Bramble Reggie	2	5-1	28.52	Steve Anderson
3rd	Droopys Verve	3	4-5f	28.65	Angela Harrison
4th	Bramble Milburn	6	12-1	28.87	Steve Anderson
5th	Droopys Nadal	5	16-1	29.06	Angela Harrison
6th	Drooys Trapper	4	3-1	29.24	Angela Harrison

Oaks, Abbey Stadium (22 Dec, 480m, £15,000)
Pos	Name of Greyhound	Trap	SP	Time	Trainer
1st	Ravenswood Flo	1	3-1	28.82	Kevin Hutton
2nd	Magical Vera	6	3-1	28.91	Kevin Hutton
3rd	Emers Cookie	2	10-1	29.09	Paul Meek
4th	Ballynabee Lucy	3	8-1	29.16	Barry O'Sullivan
5th	Jumeirah Charm	4	5-2f	29.28	Gerry Holian
6th	Chubbys Caviar	5	7-2	2958	Mark Wallis

=== Principal Irish finals ===
Ladbrokes Easter Cup, Shelbourne (10 Mar, 550y, €25,000)
Pos	Name of Greyhound	Trap	SP	Time	Trainer
1st	Colarhouse Gerry	1	9-2	29.56	Owen McKenna
2nd	Kilgraney Master	6	7-1	29.84	Thomas Buggy
3rd	Fast Fit Alex	5	25-1	29.86	Noel Walker
4th	Karlow Joe	3	14-1	29.91	Henry Kelly
5th	Good News	2	1-1f	29.96	Patrick Guilfoyle
6th	Droopys Noah	4	9-4	30.21	John Linehan

Kirby Memorial Stakes, Limerick (21 Apr, 525y, €80,000)
Pos	Name of Greyhound	Trap	SP	Time	Trainer
1st	Droopys Davy	6	4-5f	28.10	Pat Buckley
2nd	Da Head Hunter	2	6-1	28.52	Peter Cronin
3rd	Slippy Cian	4	9-2	28.66	Graham Holland
4th	Master Jingles	1	10-1	28.97	Francis Murray
5th	Lemon Shane	3	7-2	29.08	Gerry Holian
6th	Blue East	5	8-1	29.53	Graham Holland

Sporting Press Oaks, Shelbourne (26 May, 525y, €25,000)
Pos	Name of Greyhound	Trap	SP	Time	Trainer
1st	Jaytee Jordan	2	7-2	28.47	Paul Hennessy
2nd	Droopys Loom	1	6-1	28.52	John Linehan
3rd	Ballinakil Clare	5	9-4f	28.77	Graham Holland
4th	Aayamza Express	4	9-2	28.80	Karol Ramsbottom
5th	Tibet	6	5-1	28.98	Patrick Norris
6th	Nice Mystery	3	9-2	29.15	Pat Buckley

Larry O'Rourke National Produce, Clonmel (3 June, 525y, €20,000)
Pos	Name of Greyhound	Trap	SP	Time	Trainer
1st	Cash Is King	6	6-4f	28.43	Brendan Maunsell
2nd	Nice Charmer	2	7-2	28.78	Graham Holland
3rd	Pennylane Masara	1	5-2	28.89	Pat Buckley
4th	Uncle Wexford	3	5-2	29.31	James Robinson
5th	Blue East	5	5-2	29.41	Graham Holland
6th	Ballyanne Sim	4	4-1	29.87	James Robinson

EOS IT Solutions Dundalk International, Dundalk (12 Jul, 550y, €20,000)
Pos	Name of Greyhound	Trap	SP	Time	Trainer
1st	Droopys Verve	3	1-1f	29.39+	Angela Harrison (UK)
2nd	Borna Gin	1	5-2	29.40	Pat Buckley
3rd	Jumeirah Charm	2	14-1	29.73	Gerry Holian
4th	Slippery Jade	4	20-1	30.01	Larry Dunne
5th	Whoops Jack	5	4-1	30.06	Peter Cronin
6th	Cabra Angel	6	7-1	30.34	Patrick Guilfoyle

+ Track record

Irish Independent Laurels, Cork (14 Jul, 525y, €30,000)
Pos	Name of Greyhound	Trap	SP	Time	Trainer
1st	Rockybay Foley	3	4-5f	28.37	Kieran Lynch
2nd	Native Chimes	2	5-2	28.58	Johnny O'Sullivan
3rd	Rockybay Rover	1	5-1	28.61	Kieran Lynch
4th	Clearly Written	6	7-1	28.82	Denis P O'Malley
5th	Away Jet	5	20-1	28.89	Paul Hennessy
6th	Nice Mystery	4	7-1	29.03	Pat Buckley

Boylesports Champion Stakes, Shelbourne (28 July, 550y, €20,000)
Pos	Name of Greyhound	Trap	SP	Time	Trainer
1st	Jaytee Yankee	4	4-1	29.58	Paul Hennessy
2nd	Frisky Luck	5	5-2f	29.63	James Melia
3rd	Clonbrien Hero	1	3-1	29.91	Graham Holland
4th	Ballydoyle Flash	3	3-1	29.92	Graham Holland
5th	Ballybough Dad	6	6-1	29.99	Martin Murt Leahy
6th	Clonbrien Prince	2	10-1	30.13	Graham Holland

Dublin Coach Juvenile Derby, Shelbourne (19 Oct, 550y, €22,500)
Pos	Name of Greyhound	Trap	SP	Time	Trainer
1st	Balline Kyle	6	4-1	28.60	John Byrne
2nd	Sliabh Liag	4	6-1	28.77	Karol Ramsbottom
3rd	Ballymac Anton	2	5-4f	28.91	Liam Dowling
4th	Budgie Wudgie	1	10-1	28.98	Paul Hennessy
5th	Ballymac Trinkle	5	8-1	29.04	Liam Dowling
6th	Ulysses	3	7-2	29.35	Leonard O'Hanlon

Barking Buzz App Irish St Leger, Limerick (3 Nov, 550y, €25,000)
Pos	Name of Greyhound	Trap	SP	Time	Trainer
1st	Blastoff Jet	5	5-1	29.65	Philip Buckley
2nd	Lenson Blinder	4	6-4jf	29.79	Graham Holland
3rd	Nice Charmer	1	6-1	29.81	Graham Holland
4th	Clonbrien Prince	3	6-4jf	30.02	Graham Holland
5th	Crohane Prince	2	12-1	30.02	Declan Byrne
6th	Urban Jet	6	16-1	30.16	Robert Roberts

=== UK Category 1 & 2 competitions ===
Competition	Date	Venue	Winning Greyhound	Winning Trainer	Time	SP	Notes
Coral Coronation Cup	19 Jan	Romford	Shotgun Bullet	Derek Knight (Hove)	35.25	10-11f	
Racing Post Juvenile	6 Mar	Sheffield	Bull Run Button	Barrie Draper (Sheffield)	28.86	9-4	
Cearnsport Springbok	9 Mar	Central Park	Lenson Wilson	Ricky Holloway (Central Park)	29.63	4-9f	
Coral Essex Vase+	16 Mar	Romford	Murrys Act	Kevin Boon (Yarmouth)	35.34	2-1	
Coral Golden Sprint	16 Mar	Romford	Forest Chunk	Kevin Hutton (Towcester)	24.03	11-10f	
Ladbrokes Puppy Derby	21 Mar	Monmore	Rising Brandy	Matt Dartnall (Towcester)	27.82	7-4	
Astute Electronics Gold Cup	25 Mar	Towcester	King Turbo	Liz McNair (Private)	27.92	7-4jf	
Kent Silver Salver	30 Mar	Central Park	Roxholme Hat	Hayley Keightley (Doncaster)	16.36	1-2f	
Bresmed Northern Sprint	17 Apr	Sheffield	Cotton Pants	Mark Wallis (Towcester)	15.98	10-1	
Golden Crest	17 Apr	Poole	Headford Kev	Kevin Hutton (Towcester)	26.81	5-2	
Betfred Gymcrack	22 Apr	Kinsley	Brinkleys Poet	Matt Dartnall (Towcester)	26.95	4-7f	Track Record
Coral Regency	10 May	Hove	Clares Kyletaun	June Harvey (Swindon)	41.05	1-2f	
BGBF Puppy Cup	15 May	Sheffield	Roxhill Mystique	Paul Sallis (Monmore)	29.21	9-2	
Star Sports Champion Hurdle	2 Jun	Towcester	Lenson Wilson	Ricky Holloway (Central Park)	28.40	6-5f	
Ladbrokes Gold Collar	26 Jun	Crayford	Droopys Dresden	Phil Simmonds (Romford)	33.93	9-4	
RPGTV Select Stakes	2 Jul	Nottingham	Brinkleys Poet	Matt Dartnall (Towcester)	29.56	2-1f	
British Bred Produce Stakes	21 Jul	Swindon	Zenas Zeus	Jenny March (Central Park)	28.90	3-1	
Coral Sussex Cup	3 Aug	Hove	Sporting Dave	Seamus Cahill (Hove)	29.79	5-4	
William Hill Northern Puppy Derby	9 Aug	Newcastle	Droopys Trawler	Andrew Wood (Shawfield)	28.76	8-1	
Ladbrokes Summer Stayers Classic	9 Aug	Monmore	Ela Juliet	Matt Dartnall (Towcester)	37.77	7-4jf	
Ladbrokes Guys and Dolls	21 Aug	Crayford	Kilmore Lemon	Patrick Janssens (Towcester)	22.89	1-2f	
Ladbrokes Gold Cup	23 Aug	Monmore	King Turbo	Liz McNair (Private)	28.30	5-4f	
GMG Puppy Classic	27 Aug	Nottingham	Blue Trooper	Nigel Saunders (Belle Vue)	30.29	4-1	
Coral Champion Stakes	31 Aug	Romford	Bombers Bullet	Mark Wallis (Henlow)	34.97	5-2f	
GMG Three Steps to Victory	4 Sep	Sheffield	Swift Hansel	Anna Thompson (Nottingham)	39.42	9-4	
Lowther Stakes	10 Sep	Nottingham	Donation	Heather Dimmock (Henlow)	28.78	7-4f	
Jay & Kay Coach Tours Kent St Leger	15 Sep	Crayford	Slippy Maggie	Hazel Kemp (Peterborough)	45.72	9-4	
BAPP Group Scurry Cup	15 Sep	Belle Vue	Troy Bella	David Mullins (Romford)	15.07	7-1	
BAPP Group Northern Flat	15 Sep	Belle Vue	Fernhill Rex	Lee Field (Doncaster)	27.56	5-2	
Slim Somerville/Rhys Bramwell Trafalgar Cup	22 Sep	Monmore	King Sheeran	Liz McNair (Private)	28.34	11-10	
GMG Steel City Cup	2 Oct	Sheffield	Roxholme Nidge	Hayley Keightley (Doncaster)	28.53	1-2f	
Ladbrokes Kent Derby	7 Oct	Central Park	King Turbo	Liz McNair (Private)	28.96	4-6f	
S.I.S Yorkshire St Leger	8 Oct	Doncaster	Roxholme Poppy	Hayley Keightley (Doncaster)	41.74	5-2jf	
William Hill All England Cup	25 Oct	Newcastle	Droopys Verve	Angela Harrison (Newcastle)	28.24	1-2f	
The Hawk Henlow Derby	28 Oct	Henlow	Bubbly Turbo	Paul Young (Romford)	27.36	8-1	
British Breeders Stakes	29 Oct	Nottingham	Let Me Tell You	Angie Kibble (Swindon)	29.96	9-2	
Coral Brighton Belle	1 Nov	Hove	Ballymac Miscula	Kim Billingham (Monmore)	30.00	2-1	
Coral Romford Puppy Cup	23 Nov	Romford	Grays Cup Winner	Phil Simmonds (Romford)	24.08	2-1	
MSCM Eclipse	26 Nov	Nottingham	Dorotas Wildcat	Kevin Hutton (Monmore)	29.35	4-6f	
Coral Essex Vase	7 Dec	Romford	Prime Time	Phil Simmonds (Romford)	35.34	7-1	
BGBF British Bred Derby	11 Dec	Sheffield	Geelo Monty	Carl Perry (Sheffield)	29.05	5-2	
Gain Nutrition Puppy Derby	16 Dec	Henlow	Argentina	Kevin Hutton (Monmore)	27.50	4-1	
Local Parking Security National Sprint	17 Dec	Nottingham	Calzaghe Flash	Ted Soppitt (Newcastle)	17.55	1-1f	
Coral Olympic	27 Dec	Hove	King Turbo	Liz McNair (Private)	29.90	6-4f	

+Delayed 2017 edition

=== Irish feature competitions ===
Competition	Date	Venue	Winning Greyhound	Winning Trainer	Time	SP	Notes
Best Car Parks Gold Cup	10 Feb	Shelbourne	Chespirito	Liam Dowling	28.52	7-1	
GMHD Insurances Juvenile Classic	9 Mar	Tralee	Ballymac Bolger	Liam Dowling	28.53	4-1	
All Pet Supplies Irish Cesarewitch	7 Apr	Mullingar	Master Grizzly	Declan Byrne	33.21	8-1	
Frightful Flash Kennels McCalmont Cup	6 Apr	Kilkenny	Ballybough Dad	Martin 'Murt' Leahy	29.06	5-4f	
Gain Open 600	28 Apr	Shelbourne	Javielenko	Pat Buckley	32.61	12-1	
Kerry GAA Race of Champions	8 Jun	Tralee	Clonbrien Hero	Graham Holland	29.99	5-2	
Thurles Fresh Milk Tipperary Cup	4 Aug	Thurles	Skywalker Rafa	Michael J O'Donovan	28.81	1-1f	
Gain Corn Cuchulainn	5 Aug	Shelbourne	Javielenko	Pat Buckley	41.26	7-4	
Bar One Racing Irish Sprint Cup	15 Aug	Dundalk	Ardnasool Jet	Cathal McGhee	21.07	3-1	
Texacloth Juvenile Derby	14 Sep	Newbridge	Ulysses	Leonard O'Hanlon	28.58	7-2	
Cox Cup	14 Sep	Newbridge	Kylehill Strauss	Raymond Dowling	30.41	3-1	
Gain Greyhound Nutrition Select Stakes	10 Nov	Waterford	Cabra Hurricane	Patrick Guilfoyle	28.29	4-6f	
Greyhound & Petworld Luxury Transport Irish Grand National	15 Dec	Cork	Lightfoot Prince	Pat Kiely	28.81	2-1	
