= 2019 UK & Ireland Greyhound Racing Year =

2019 UK & Ireland Greyhound Racing Year was the 94th year of greyhound racing in the United Kingdom and the 93rd year of greyhound racing in Ireland.

The year marked an end of an era when the 94-year-old company the Greyhound Racing Association (GRA) or more recently the GRA Acquisition came to an end.

== Roll of honour ==
Major Winners
Award	Name of Winner
2019 English Greyhound Derby	Priceless Blake (Paul Hennessy)
2019 Irish Greyhound Derby	Lenson Bocko (Graham Holland)
Greyhound Trainer of the Year	Mark Wallis
UK Greyhound of the Year	Ice On Fire (James Fenwick)
Irish Greyhound of the Year	Killmacdonagh (Kieran Lynch)

Gain Nutrition GTA Trainers Championship, Sheffield (6 Apr)
Pos	Name of Trainer	Points
1st	Angela Harrison	49
2nd	Patrick Janssens	43
3rd	Kevin Hutton	41
4th	Mark Wallis	37.5
5th	Phil Simmonds	37
6th	John Mullins	16.5

== Summary ==
All news was overshadowed by the demise of the once-great Greyhound Racing Association, more recently known as the GRA and then Clive Feltham's GRA Acquisition. The company had been declining since 2005, following the sale from Wembley plc to Risk Capital Partners and Galliard Homes and the inevitable resulted when the final two leases held at Belle Vue Stadium and Perry Barr Stadium were sold to the Arena Racing Company (ARC) in October. The company had brought racing to the United Kingdom in 1925 and had been the primary promoter for 70 years.

Positive news was announced in January when major bookmakers agreed to pay a voluntary payment into the British Greyhound Racing Fund from their internet businesses. The agreement was signed by Ladbrokes Coral, William Hill, Betfred, bet365, Paddy Power Betfair and Sky Betting & Gaming and was expected to generate an extra £3 million for the fund, which goes directly towards greyhound welfare connected to Greyhound Board of Great Britain tracks in the UK. The move was welcomed by the industry who had been asking the bookmakers for assistance towards welfare funding for some time.

The year ended badly with the news that housing planning permission for Belle Vue had been passed on 19 December.

== News ==
The media rights war raged on between SIS and ARC. Contracts had been signed by the tracks but some trainers were moving to tracks with SIS contracts that offered a better deal. The industry continued to wait to see long term consequences of the media rights battle.

The media rights battle had already affected the open race schedule, the ARC owned Sunderland scrapped the William Hill Grand Prix and vastly reduced the prize money for the Classic. Another consequence of the media rights battle was the change to the racing schedule at tracks, which now generally consisted of daytime racing and a Saturday night fixture.

There was a double retirement during June with both the 2017 Greyhound of the Year King Elvis and 2017 Scottish Derby champion Dorotas Woo Hoo finishing their careers. 2018 English Greyhound Derby champion Dorotas Wildcat was also retired after a gallant attempt to defend his title in the summer.

== Ireland ==
The new English Derby champion Priceless Blake returned to action against a high class field in the Dundalk International and finished runner-up to Irish Oaks champion Killmacdonagh in the €20,000 one-off race, the latter had recently broke two track records.

Drumbo Park re-opened on 13 July under the management of 'Run With Passion Ltd'. The track opened on the back of a news program by Raidió Teilifís Éireann billed as an exposé on excess breeding within Irish racing. The program drew criticism of breeder practices in Ireland but the industry also criticised RTE and its failure to include coursing, international sales, independent tracks etc. in the report. The Irish Greyhound Board condemned the breeder practices shown in the program and vowed to take action under the new Greyhound Racing Ireland Act 2019. Additionally the Bord na gCon was renamed the Rásaíocht Con Éireann (Greyhound Racing Ireland). During October 2019 the IGB released the latest statistics appertaining to welfare under the Strategic Plan 2018–2022.

Leading journalist and broadcaster Michael Fortune died.

The Patrick Guilfoyle trained Skywalker Logan won the Cesarewitch and the Corn Cuchulainn; the white and black dog also had a great English Derby campaign and was making a great case for being voted Irish Greyhound of the Year. The other contenders would be Killmacdonagh and the two Derby champions Lenson Bocko and Priceless Blake. The winner was Killmacdonagh, Lenson Bocko was dog of the year and Skywalker Logan was surprisingly not event named stayer of the year losing out to Redzer Ardfert.

== Competitions ==
Angela Harrison won her first Trainers Championship defeating the in form Patrick Janssens and former champions Kevin Hutton and Mark Wallis. Harrison only took over the kennels from partner Jimmy Wright in 2017. Wright was integral in helping Harrison win the title, as were her two powerhouses Droopys Expert and Droopys Verve who both produced strong wins. The pair then immediately headed for the Scottish Derby where Verve recorded the fastest heat win and Expert progressed to the semi-finals behind Boylesports Xtra. The prolific King Turbo also won a heat but of the four only Droopys Verve qualified for the final by producing the fastest 29.02 win in the semi-finals. However the final went to Irish entry Braveheart Bobby from Cooneen Jack with Droopys Verve failing to recover from a poor start taking third.

Trafalgar Cup champion King Sheeran deservedly won the 73rd British Bred Two-Year-Old Produce Stakes and led home his two brothers King Cash and King Dylan for a litter 1–2–3; Liz McNair trained the first four home because the trio's half sister Queen Cher finished fourth. The racing year belonged to Ireland meaning that the selection of a UK Greyhound of the Year would not be straight forward but Ice on Fire stood out after gaining four major wins in the Puppy Classic, All England Cup and the Eclipse and the Laurels. He was duly awarded the title during the following January awards.

Mark Wallis ended the year with 1120 open race points and therefore retaining his Greyhound Trainer of the Year title and extending his record to eleven titles.

=== Principal UK finals ===
Ladbrokes Golden Jacket, Crayford (23 Feb, 714m, £17,500)
Pos	Name of Greyhound	Trap	SP	Time	Trainer
1st	Stardom	1	6-4f	45.27	Heather Dimmock
2nd	Towcester Story	2	9-2	45.29	Brendan Matthews
3rd	Goldies Hotspur	5	5-1	45.59	Patrick Janssens
4th	Headford Maurice	4	25-1	45.69	Kevin Boon
5th	Shotgun Bullet	6	5-2	45.70	Derek Knight
6th	Savana Winner	3	9-2	46.02	Diane Henry

Cearnsport Grand National, Central Park (28 April, 480mH, £8,000)
Pos	Name of Greyhound	Trap	SP	Time	Trainer
1st	Caislean Fifi	6	10-11f	29.30	Seamus Cahill
2nd	Emiles Eske	3	12-1	29.68	Jim Reynolds
3rd	Castlehill Wally	1	20-1	29.76	Barry O'Sullivan
4th	Turnhouse Jet	5	15-2	29.80	Ricky Holloway
5th	Mane Mane	4	1-1	30.95	Ernest Gaskin Jr.
N/R	Barricane Jack	2			Jason Foster

Racing Post GTV Scottish Derby, Shawfield (4 May, 480m, £20,000)
Pos	Name of Greyhound	Trap	SP	Time	Trainer
1st	Braveheart Bobby	3	3-1	28.88	Pat Buckley
2nd	Cooneen Jack	1	8-1	29.04	James Fenwick
3rd	Droopys Verve	5	1-1f	29.14	Angela Harrison
4th	Droopys Nadal	6	3-1	29.22	Angela Harrison
5th	Greenwell Jean	2	16-1	29.28	Pat Flaherty
6th	Jaguar Jack	4	7-1	29.32	Graham Rankin

Coral TV Trophy, Romford (13 Sep, 925m, £10,000)
Pos	Name of Greyhound	Trap	SP	Time	Trainer
1st	Bumblebee Bullet	3	14-1	59.26	Mark Wallis
2nd	Aayamza Breeze	1	7-2	59.29	Mark Wallis
3rd	Riverside Honey	6	4-5f	59.33	Graham Holland
4th	Savana Winner	4	5-2	59.51	Diane Henry
5th	Burgess Honey	5	12-1	59.59	Anthony Gifkins
6th	Causeway Sergie	2	33-1	60.11	Chris Akers

RPGTV East Anglian Derby, Yarmouth (19 Sep, 462m, £15,000)
Pos	Name of Greyhound	Trap	SP	Time	Trainer
1st	Roxholme Nidge	3	4-11f	27.89	Hayley Keightley
2nd	Dower Product	4	20-1	28.09	Phil Simmonds
3rd	Tree Top Danny	6	16-1	28.16	Eric Cantillon
4th	Mary Goodnight	5	7-1	28.22	Sandra Clayton
5th	Seaglass Tiger	1	7-2	28.23	Patrick Janssens
6th	Rockburst Dutch	2	33-1	28.38	Eric Cantillon

RPGTV St Leger, Perry Barr (16 Nov, 710m, £15,000)
Pos	Name of Greyhound	Trap	SP	Time	Trainer
1st	Redzer Ardfert	1	5-4f	43.12	Brendan Maunsell
2nd	Antigua Fire	5	7-4	43.38	Mark Wallis
3rd	Avastorm	4	20-1	43.42	Mark Wallis
4th	Summer Savvy	6	20-1	44.04	Paul Sallis
5th	Brave Ark	3	12-1	44.12	Matt Dartnall
6th	Skilful Sandie	2	7-2	00.00	Patrick Janssens

Oaks, Swindon (14 Dec, 476m, £15,000)
Pos	Name of Greyhound	Trap	SP	Time	Trainer
1st	Bull Run Byte	1	7-4	28.29	Kevin Hutton
2nd	Touchdown Erin	4	16-1	28.52	Belinda Green
3rd	Sonic Spur	5	5-4f	28.56	Chris Akers
4th	Ballyamc Saga	3	12-1	28.63	Kim Billingham
5th	Queen Franklin	6	3-1	28. 99	Liz McNair
6th	Ballymac Cloud	2	25-1	29.08	Kim Billingham

=== Principal Irish finals ===
Ladbrokes Easter Cup, Shelbourne (9 Mar, 550y, €25,000)
Pos	Name of Greyhound	Trap	SP	Time	Trainer
1st	Clona Blaze	6	5-2f	29.37	Graham Holland
2nd	Clonbrien Prince	2	7-2	29.39	Graham Holland
3rd	Droopys Davy	5	7-2	29.60	Pat Buckley
4th	Gurteen Feather	1	4-1	29.70	David Murray
5th	Braveheart Bobby	3	9-1	29.81	Darren McCoy
6th	Lenson Blinder	4	7-2	29.88	Graham Holland

Kirby Memorial Stakes, Limerick (20 Apr, 525y, €80,000)
Pos	Name of Greyhound	Trap	SP	Time	Trainer
1st	Toolmaker Josie	4	6-1	28.37	Robert Gleeson
2nd	Herecomesdahoney	1	7-4	28.44	Graham Holland
3rd	Antigua Rum	6	4-1	28.58	Tom O'Neill
4th	Ballymac Tas	3	6-4f	28.65	Liam Dowling
5th	Deadly Storm	2	8-1	29.07	Michael J O'Donovan
N/R	Ballymac Syd	5			Liam Dowling

Sporting Press Oaks, Shelbourne (1 Jun, 525y, €25,000)
Pos	Name of Greyhound	Trap	SP	Time	Trainer
1st	Killmacdonagh	1	4-1	28.17	Kieran Lynch
2nd	No Recollection	4	6-1	28.52	Oliver Bray
3rd	Clona Dream	2	10-1	28.66	Graham Holland
4th	Ballymac Arminta	3	4-6f	28.67	Liam Dowling
5th	Priceless Verona	6	8-1	28.68	Paul Hennessy
6th	Luminous Milan	5	25-1	28.85	Denis Lennon

Larry O'Rourke National Produce, Clonmel (9 Jun, 525y, €20,000)
Pos	Name of Greyhound	Trap	SP	Time	Trainer
1st	Grangeview Ten	3	5-2	28.62	Patrick Guilfoyle
2nd	Ardfert Rooster	6	4-1	28.79	Timmy Carmody
3rd	Riverside Leo	4	1-1f	29.04	Graham Holland
4th	Rockburst Dutch	5	5-1	29.11	Graham Holland
5th	Mucky Brae	1	2-1	29.25	Michael J O'Donovan
6th	Herecomesdahoney	2	3-1	29.26	Graham Holland

Dundalk International, Dundalk (12 Jul, 550y, €20,000)
Pos	Name of Greyhound	Trap	SP	Time	Trainer
1st	Killmacdonagh	5	5-2	29.42	Kieran Lynch
2nd	Priceless Blake	4	5-1	29.75	Paul Hennessy
3rd	Ballymac Arminta	1	5-4f	29.87	Liam Dowling
4th	Skywalker Logan	6	5-1	30.05	Patrick Guilfoyle
5th	Gurteen Feather	2	16-1	30.24	David Murray
6th	Ballyanne Sim	3	7-1	30.31	Mark Robinson

Boylesports Champion Stakes, Shelbourne (27 July, 550y, €20,000)
Pos	Name of Greyhound	Trap	SP	Time	Trainer
1st	Ballymac Arminta	5	4-5f	29.31	Liam Dowling
2nd	Run Happy	2	9-2	29.38	Pat Buckley
3rd	Totos Park	6	7-1	29.62	Graham Holland
4th	Wolfe	4	3-1	29.69	Graham Holland
5th	Droopys Neymar	3	20-1	29.94	Peter Sutcliffe
6th	Jaytee Sienna	1	14-1	30.29	Paul Hennessy

Dublin Coach Juvenile Derby, Shelbourne (18 Oct, 525y, €22,500)
Pos	Name of Greyhound	Trap	SP	Time	Trainer
1st	Broadstrand Bono	2	6-4f	28.15	John Linehan
2nd	Glenlara Ace	1	6-1	28.32	Liam Kirley
3rd	Deanridge Sirius	3	9-2	28.43	Ian Reilly
4th	Droopys Hunch	6	5-2	28.53	Martin Murt Leahy
5th	Newline Darn Hot	5	6-1	28.57	Robert Gleeson
6th	Ballymac Wisdom	4	12-1	28.64	Liam Dowling

Irish Laurels, Cork (19 Oct, 525y, €30,000)
Pos	Name of Greyhound	Trap	SP	Time	Trainer
1st	Rockybay Foley	1	7-4f	28.57	Kieran Lynch
2nd	Doona Buck	4	10-1	28.58	Gerry Holian
3rd	Grangeview Ten	3	5-2	28.59	Patrick Guilfoyle
4th	Ballyanne Sim	2	4-1	28.64	Mark Robinson
5th	Clona Blaze	5	4-1	28.75	Graham Holland
6th	Newinn Lester	6	3-1	28.89	Graham Holland

Friends of Limerick Irish St Leger, Limerick (23 Nov, 550y, €30,000)
Pos	Name of Greyhound	Trap	SP	Time	Trainer
1st	Ballymac Anton	3	4-1	29.53	Liam Dowling
2nd	Lenson Austin	5	5-1	29.74	Graham Holland
3rd	Wolfe	2	1-1f	29.88	Graham Holland
4th	Cash Is King	6	8-1	29.98	Brendan Maunsell
5th	Murts Boher	1	9-2	30.19	Graham Holland
6th	Totos Park	4	16-1	30.37	Graham Holland

=== UK Category 1 & 2 competitions ===
Competition	Date	Venue	Winning Greyhound	Winning Trainer	Time	SP	Notes
Coral Coronation Cup	18 Jan	Romford	Desperado Dan	Patrick Janssens (Central Park)	35.27	2-1	
Racing Post Juvenile	2 Mar	Sheffield	Seaglass Phantom	Patrick Janssens (Central Park)	28.60	5-2	
Cearnsport Springbok	3 Mar	Central Park	Burgess Brandy	Ricky Holloway (Central Park)	28.67	9-4	
Coral Winter Derby	7 Mar	Hove	King Turbo	Liz McNair (Private)	28.46	7-4f	
Coral Golden Sprint	15 Mar	Romford	Union Jack	Jean Liles (Central Park)	24.04	4-1	
Ladbrokes Puppy Derby	16 Mar	Monmore	Troy Zico	David Mullins (Romford)	28.94	6-1	
RPGTV Steel City Cup	23 Mar	Sheffield	Roxholme Nidge	Hayley Keightley (Doncaster)	28.53	11-4	
Ladbrokes Crayford Rosebowl	30 Mar	Crayford	Sleepy Genie	David Puddy (Harlow)	23.29	4-9f	
Kent Silver Salver	31 Mar	Central Park	Magical Houdini	Patrick Janssens (Central Park)	16.18	13-8	
RPGTV Golden Crest	14 Apr	Poole	King Elvis	Liz McNair (Private)	26.70	4-6f	
Coral Regency	25 Apr	Hove	Aayamza Breeze	Mark Wallis (Henlow)	41.42	8-1	
Bresmed Northern Sprint	30 Apr	Sheffield	Coolavanny Dylan	Kirsty Grayson (Sheffield)	16.38	7-2	
Henlow Maiden Derby	5 May	Henlow	Dalcash Behold	Kevin Hutton (Monmore)	28.11	6-1	
George Ing St Leger	18 May	Yarmouth	Roxholme Poppy	Hayley Keightley (Doncaster)	40.07	5-4f	Track record
Ladbrokes Crayford Vase	18 May	Crayford	Crossfield Vince	Julie Luckhurst (Crayford)	33.81	3-1	
British Bred St Leger	9 Jun	Central Park	Affleck Bolt	Patrick Janssens (Central Park)	39.81	4-5f	
Ladbrokes Cesarewitch	15 Jun	Crayford	Burgess Honey	Anthony Gifkins (Henlow)	56.83	10-1	
Ladbrokes Guys and Dolls	20 Jul	Crayford	Skip Mayo	Gemma Davidson (Central Park)	23.11	20-1	
The Puppy Derby	21 Jul	Henlow	Bockos Doomie	Patrick Janssens (Central Park)	27.24	11-10f	
RPGTV Champion Hurdle	21 Jul	Central Park	Turnhouse Jet	Ricky Holloway (Central Park)	29.59	4-1	
Gain Nutrition 3 Steps to Victory	23 Jul	Sheffield	Bull Run Button	Barrie Draper (Sheffield)	39.09	11-8f	
Ted Lloyd Classic	24 Jul	Sunderland	Velvet Juliet	Angela Harrison (Newcastle)	26.70	7-4jf	
British Bred Produce Stakes	27 Jul	Swindon	King Sheeran	Liz McNair (Private)	28.41	4-6f	
RPGTV Select Stakes	29 Jul	Nottingham	Trickys Dumbo	Robert Holt (Sheffield)	29.39	3-1	
Coral Sussex Cup	1 Aug	Hove	Droopys Gold	Seamus Cahill (Hove)	29.65	1-1f	
Ladbrokes Summer Stayers Classic	17 Aug	Monmore	Sheldan	Kevin Boon (Yarmouth)	37.45	9-2	
Ladbrokes Gold Cup	17 Aug	Monmore	Seaglass Tiger	Patrick Janssens (Central Park)	28.28	4-1	
Puppy Classic	26 Aug	Nottingham	Ice on Fire	James Fenwick (Newcastle)	29.39	4-5f	
Coral Champion Stakes	6 Sep	Romford	Aayamza Express	Mark Wallis (Henlow)	34.90	6-4f	
Northern Plate	26 Sep	Newcastle	Witton Derecho	Jill Sutherst (Sunderland)	28.30	5-1	
Coral Romford Puppy Cup	27 Sep	Romford	Young Princess	Paul Young (Romford)	24.09	12-1	
Jay & Kay Coach Tours Kent St Leger	5 Oct	Crayford	Antigua Fire	Mark Wallis (Henlow)	23.11	5-2	
Ladbrokes Kent Derby	6 Oct	Central Park	Forest Alan	Seamus Cahill (Hove)	29.00	4-1	
BAPP Group Scurry Cup	19 Oct	Belle Vue	Droopys Reel	Angela Harrison (Newcastle)	15.03	11-4	
British Breeders Stakes	21 Oct	Nottingham	Romeo Rumble	John Mullins (Yarmouth)	29.77	12-1	
S.I.S Yorkshire St Leger	23 Oct	Doncaster	Droopys Live	Angela Harrison (Newcastle)	41.65	7-2	
Alconex All England Cup	24 Oct	Newcastle	Ice on Fire	James Fenwick (Newcastle)	28.16	4-5f	
Ladbrokes Gold Collar	2 Nov	Crayford	Saving Sonic	John Mullins (Yarmouth)	33.95	7-2	
Coral Brighton Belle	7 Nov	Hove	Galloping Moon	Kevin Hutton (Monmore)	30.22	6-4f	
Carling Eclipse	18 Nov	Nottingham	Ice on Fire	James Fenwick (Newcastle)	29.25	4-9f	
Trafalgar Cup	30 Nov	Monmore	Droopys Addition	Ernest Gaskin Jr. (Private)	28.05	5-2	
Coral Essex Vase	6 Dec	Romford	Droopys Aoife	Ernest Gaskin Jr. (Private)	35.08	9-2	
BGBF British Bred Derby	10 Dec	Sheffield	King Sheeran	Liz McNair (Private)	29.11	7-4f	
Alconex Northern Puppy Derby	19 Dec	Newcastle	Levante Beach	Angela Harrison (Newcastle)	28.89	4-5f	
O'Toole's Gym Byker Laurels	19 Dec	Newcastle	Ice on Fire	James Fenwick (Newcastle)	28.57	1-4f	
Local Parking Security National Sprint	23 Dec	Nottingham	Troy Bella	David Mullins (Romford)	17.79	2-1	
Coral Olympic	28 Dec	Hove	King Sheeran	Liz McNair (Private)	29.93	2-1jf	

=== Irish feature competitions ===
Competition	Date	Venue	Winning Greyhound	Winning Trainer	Time	SP	Notes
Best Car Parks Gold Cup	9 Feb	Shelbourne	Music Toour Ears	Patrick Guilfoyle	28.33	7-2	
GMHD Insurances Juvenile Classic	9 Mar	Tralee	Toolmaker Daddy	Robert G Gleeson	28.40	4-1	
Bar One Racing Irish Sprint Cup	29 Mar	Dundalk	Ardnasool Jet	Cathal McGhee	20.97	6-4f	
Gain Nutrition Open 600	30 Mar	Shelbourne	Clonbrien Prince	Graham Holland	32.24	9-2	
Frightful Flash Kennels McCalmont Cup	12 Apr	Kilkenny	Skywalker Rafa	Michael J O'Donovan	28.87	4-7f	
Gain Greyhound Nutrition Select Stakes	27 Apr	Waterford	Blue East	Graham Holland	28.44	7-2	
Larry Clancy Memorial Irish Cesarewitch	11 May	Mullingar	Skywalker Logan	Patrick Guilfoyle	33.40	5-4f	
Navillus Race of Champions	14 Jun	Tralee	Slippy Cian	Graham Holland	29.60	2-1	
Tipperary Cup	3 Aug	Thurles	Ghost Dancer	Owen McKenna	28.81	1-1f	
Gain Corn Cuchulainn	9 Aug	Shelbourne	Skywalker Logan	Patrick Guilfoyle	41.32	6-4f	
Texacloth Juvenile Derby	13 Sep	Newbridge	Costa Plenti	James Melia	28.52	5-4f	
Irish Grand National	21 Dec	Cork	Lightfoot Kante	Pat Kiely	29.01	1-1f	
