= 2017 UK & Ireland Greyhound Racing Year =

2017 UK & Ireland Greyhound Racing Year was the 92nd year of greyhound racing in the United Kingdom and the 91st year of greyhound racing in Ireland.

== Summary ==
=== Wimbledon and Hall Green ===
The year was best known for the closure of the GRA operated tracks of Wimbledon Stadium and Hall Green Stadium. Wimbledon closed on 25 March. Wimbledon's sister track Hall Green, owned by Euro Property Investments Ltd, closed on 29 July and will be demolished.

=== Towcester Derby ===
The premier competition of the year, the English Greyhound Derby, was held at Towcester on 1 July, the first time in the competition's history that it was held outside of London. It was won by 28-1 shot Astute Missile; the outsider of the six in the final.

=== Irish protests ===
In Ireland continuing protests by the DGOBA resulted in a suspension of racing at Shelbourne Park for five months and the cancellation of several major events. The protest was over the February closure of Harold's Cross Stadium. The Irish Derby held in September was won by the Patrick Guilfoyle trained Good News.

=== Streaming Rights & Bookmakers ===
The industry experienced a battle for broadcasting and streaming rights between Satellite Information Services (SIS) and the Arena Racing Company (ARC). Each signed up various tracks to enable them to produce fixtures for the bookmaking chains, the latter ARC even bought two tracks (Sunderland and Newcastle) from William Hill in May. Ladbrokes and Gala Coral merged to become Ladbrokes Coral.

=== Other News ===
One of the sports leading events, the Laurels, switched from the GRA and Belle Vue to Newcastle. The move was seen as positive with high hopes that the race could regain some of its former glory and increase its prize fund. Mark Wallis extended his champion trainer trophy record to nine.

== Roll of honour ==
Major Winners
Award	Name of Winner
2017 English Greyhound Derby	Astute Missile (Seamus Cahill)
2017 Irish Greyhound Derby	Good News (Patrick Guilfoyle)
Greyhound Trainer of the Year	Mark Wallis (Towcester)
UK Greyhound of the Year	King Elvis (Liz McNair)
Irish Greyhound of the Year	Good News (Patrick Guilfoyle)

GTA Trainers Championship, (Towcester) (Mar 28)
Pos	Name of Trainer	Points
1st	Kevin Hutton	43
2nd	Mark Wallis	42
3rd	Jimmy Wright	40
4th	John Mullins	36
5th	Seamus Cahill	33
6th	Paul Young	30

=== Principal UK finals ===
Ladbrokes Golden Jacket, Crayford (Feb 21, 714m, £17,500)
Pos	Name of Greyhound	Trap	SP	Time	Trainer
1st	Boylesports Star	3	2-1jf	45.18	Dolores Ruth
2nd	Rubys Razzle	1	5-2	45.58	Mark Wallis
3rd	Jimbobjoe	2	10-1	45.60	Ricky Holloway
4th	Jaytee Patriot	4	5-2jf	45.78	Paul Hennessy
5th	Ferryforth Fran	6	14-1	45.79	Mark Wallis
6th	Romany Rouge	5	16-1	45.87	Richard Devenish

RPGTV Scottish Derby, Shawfield (May 6, 480m, £20,000)
Pos	Name of Greyhound	Trap	SP	Time	Trainer
1st	Dorotas Woo Hoo	6	7-4	28.77	Charlie Lister OBE
2nd	Coolavanny Mason	1	5-1	29.07	Pat Buckley
3rd	Droopys Buick	5	5-4f	29.19	Angela Harrison
4th	Knockard Spring	2	25-1	29.41	Kevin Boon
5th	Good News	4	8-1	29.43	Pat Guilfoyle
6th	Azzurri Genesis	3	25-1	29.67	Pat Rosney

William Hill Classic, Sunderland (Jul 19, 450m, £25,000)
Pos	Name of Greyhound	Trap	SP	Time	Trainer
1st	Droopys Country	5	3-1	26.91	Angela Harrison
2nd	Toolmaker Obama	1	5-2	27.29	Robert Gleeson
3rd	Newinn Shadow	4	6-4f	27.37	Charlie Lister OBE
4th	Russelena Planet	3	25-1	27.40	Martin Cutler
5th	Viking Jimmy	6	8-1	27.43	Jim Hayton
6th	Barricane Jack	2	10-1	27.57	Patrick Janssens

William Hill Grand Prix, Sunderland (Jul 19, 640m, £15,000)
Pos	Name of Greyhound	Trap	SP	Time	Trainer
1st	Cloran Paddy	1	2-1	39.72	Charlie Lister OBE
2nd	Swift Hansel	2	6-4f	39.90	Anneliese Thompson
3rd	Glamorous Sharif	5	5-1	40.02	Paul Young
4th	Geelo Jenga	3	12-1	40.05	Carl Perry
5th	Geelo Bullet	4	6-1	40.12	Carl Perry
6th	Droopys Tee	6	7-1	40.36	Robert Gleeson

Sunbets East Anglian Derby, Yarmouth (Sep 21, 462m, £15,000)
Pos	Name of Greyhound	Trap	SP	Time	Trainer
1st	Newinn Shadow	5	8-1	27.23	Charlie Lister OBE
2nd	Murrys Act	6	9-4	27.53	Kevin Boon
3rd	Hiya Butt	2	11-8f	27.63	Hayley Keightley
4th	Bubbly Bluebird	3	2-1	27.76	Paul Young
5th	Bubbly Turbo	1	5-1	28.11	Paul Young
N/R	Knockard Spring	4			Kevin Boon

John Smiths Grand National, Central Park (Oct 3, 480mH, £8,000)
Pos	Name of Greyhound	Trap	SP	Time	Trainer
1st	Razldazl Raidio	6	2-7f	29.61	Ricky Holloway
2nd	Razldazl Star	2	25-1	29.79	Ricky Holloway
3rd	Ballymac Manix	4	8-1	30.15	Seamus Cahill
4th	Ballymac Leo	5	12-1	30.31	David Mullins
5th	Julius George	1	66-1	30.97	Tony Taylor
6th	Mystical Charlie	3	8-1		Barry O'Sullivan

William Hill St Leger, Perry Barr (Nov 8, 710m, £25,000)
Pos	Name of Greyhound	Trap	SP	Time	Trainer
1st	Rubys Rascal	1	3-1	42.99	Mark Wallis
2nd	Keplar Nine	6	5-1	43.35	Charlie Lister OBE
3rd	Goldies Hotspur	5	10-1	43.39	Patrick Janssens
4th	Slippy Maska	2	8-1	43.49	Hazel Kemp
5th	Bubbly McCoy	3	7-2	43.69	Paul Young
6th	Airmount Tess	4	2-1f	43.70	Gerald Kiely

ECC Timber Puppy Derby, Towcester (Nov 15, 500m, £20,000)
Pos	Name of Greyhound	Trap	SP	Time	Trainer
1st	Magical Bale	2	11-10f	29.10	Kevin Hutton
2nd	Innocent Times	5	7-1	29.47	Brendan Matthews
3rd	Affleck Bolt	3	8-1	29.48	Patrick Janssens
4th	Headford Kev	6	6-1	29.77	Kevin Hutton
5th	Roxholme Poppy	4	11-2	29.82	Hayley Keightley
6th	Lightfoot King	1	7-2	30.02	Elaine Parker

Colossus Bets TV Trophy, Towcester (Nov 29, 906m, £8,000)
Pos	Name of Greyhound	Trap	SP	Time	Trainer
1st	Goldies Hotspur	5	16-1	55.45	Patrick Janssens
2nd	Rubys Rascal	2	8-1	55.75	Mark Wallis
3rd	Millroad Smokey	1	6-1	55.84	Stuart Buckland
4th	Roxholme Magic	6	4-9f	56.67	Hayley Keightley
5th	Shellam Delano	4	10-1	56.85	Angela Harrison
6th	Clares Kyletaun	3	20-1	56.96	June Harvey

Greyhound Media Group Oaks, Belle Vue (Dec 13, 470m, £10,000)
Pos	Name of Greyhound	Trap	SP	Time	Trainer
1st	Wuheida	5	11-4	28.74	Phil Simmonds
2nd	Swift Lucious	4	12-1	28.83	Paul Harmes
3rd	Ballydoyle Maura	1	6-4f	28.85	Hayley Keigthley
4th	Sylvias Chloe	3	8-1	28.86	Richard Baker
5th	Donation	6	7-4	29.05	Heather Dimmock
N/R	Jumeirah Lolls	2	*disq		Gerry Holian

- Jumeirah Lolls disqualified from competing after positive sample

O'Tooles Boxing Health & Fitness Byker Newcastle Laurels, Newcastle (Dec 16, 480m, £6,000)
Pos	Name of Greyhound	Trap	SP	Time	Trainer
1st	The Other Reg	4	3-1	28.38	Pat Rosney
2nd	Droopys Expert	3	1-2f	28.54	Angela Harrison
3rd	Westway O Neill	1	50-1	28.57	Peter Aitken
4th	Cappoquin Al	2	20-1	28.66	James Fenwick
5th	Nadurra Ross	6	7-1	28.82	John McLachlan
6th	Kooga Klammer	5	8-1	29.00	David Pruhs

=== Principal Irish finals ===
Kirby Memorial Stakes, Limerick (Apr 8, 525y, €80,000)
Pos	Name of Greyhound	Trap	SP	Time	Trainer
1st	Bentekes Bocko	4	2-1f	28.39	Pat Buckley
2nd	Native Chimes	5	5-1	28.49	Johnny O'Sullivan
3rd	Coolavanny Pet	6	6-1	28.70	Liam Dowling
4th	Rathnasare Champ	1	9-2	28.81	Francis Murray
5th	Drive On Tipp	2	5-2	28.88	Graham Holland
6th	Borsalino	3	3-1	28.91	Liam Dowling

B.I.F National Produce, Clonmel (May 21, 525y, €20,000)
Pos	Name of Greyhound	Trap	SP	Time	Trainer
1st	Clonbrien Hero	3	5-4jf	28.22	Graham Holland
2nd	Lughill Robbie	4	5-4jf	28.64	Graham Holland
3rd	Dog Mac Arthure	2	7-2	28.71	Barney Mooney
4th	Kilgraney Master	1	5-1	28.88	Thomas Buggy
5th	Crossfield Kate	6	4-1	29.02	Brendan O'Shea
6th	Ballybough Dad	5	4-1	29.04	Martin 'Murt' Leahy

Racing Post Dundalk International, Dundalk (Jul 12, 550y, €20,000)
Pos	Name of Greyhound	Trap	SP	Time	Trainer
1st	Jaytee Jet	5	3-1	30.01	Paul Hennessy
2nd	Bubbly Bluebird	1	2-1jf	30.04	Paul Young
3rd	Droopys Wilbury	2	6-1	30.31	Pat Buckley
4th	Murrys Act	6	12-1	30.34	Kevin Boon
5th	Good News	4	2-1jf	30.67	Patrick Guilfoyle
6th	Droopys Acrobat	3	7-2	30.85	Seamus Cahill

Irish Independent Laurels, Cork (Jul 22, 525y, €30,000)
Pos	Name of Greyhound	Trap	SP	Time	Trainer
1st	Clonbrien Hero	4	5-2	28.00	Graham Holland
2nd	Away Jet	2	8-1	28.21	Paul Hennessy
3rd	Chawke It Down	1	3-1	28.24	Paul Hennessy
4th	Kilgraney Denver	6	6-4	28.26	Thomas Buggy
5th	Bennacht Tagdh	3	11-2	28.30	Gerry Holian
6th	Unknown Vision	5	12-1	28.51	Tony Hegarty

Boylesports Champion Stakes, Shelbourne (Aug 5, 550y, €20,000)
Pos	Name of Greyhound	Trap	SP	Time	Trainer
1st	Jaytee Yankee	3	7-1	29.58	Paul Hennessy
2nd	Whoops Jack	5	6-4f	29.72	Peter Cronin
3rd	Good News	2	7-2	29.82	Patrick Guilfoyle
4th	Kilgraney Ace	6	10-1	29.83	Thomas Buggy
5th	Drive On Tipp	1	3-1	29.87	Graham Holland
6th	Coolavanny Mason	4	10-1	29.97	Pat Buckley

Dublin Coach Juvenile Derby, Shelbourne (Oct 20, 550y, €22,500)
Pos	Name of Greyhound	Trap	SP	Time	Trainer
1st	Skywalker Rafa	4	10-1	28.40	Michael J O'Donovan
2nd	Droopys Noah	2	6-4	28.47	John Linehan
3rd	Man Twenty One	1	11-10f	28.71	Brendan Maunsell
4th	Borna Gin	3	6-1	28.82	Pat Buckley
5th	Blockthiscaller	6	20-1	28.83	David Flanagan
6th	Portmageewiseguy	5	9-2	28.90	Owen McKenna

Sporting Press Oaks, Shelbourne (Oct 21, 525y, €25,000)
Pos	Name of Greyhound	Trap	SP	Time	Trainer
1st	Forest Natalee	6	28.37	3-1	Martin Lanney
2nd	Tibet	2	28.44	5-2jf	Patrick Norris
3rd	Cabra Angel	4	28.51	5-2jf	Patrick Guilfoyle
4th	Coolavanny Pet	3	28.53	4-1	Liam Dowling
5th	Ardrahan Zindi	1	28.74	8-1	Graham Holland
6th	Mrs Chippy	5	28.77	8-1	Barney Mooney

Kerry Agribusiness Irish St Leger, Limerick (Nov 4, 550y, €25,000)
Pos	Name of Greyhound	Trap	SP	Time	Trainer
1st	Clonbrien Hero	3	5-2jf	29.60	Graham Holland
2nd	Jaytee Yankee	2	7-2	29.81	Paul Hennessy
3rd	Sonic	5	5-2jf	29.83	Graham Holland
4th	Ballybough Dad	4	7-1	29.90	Martin 'Murt' Leahy
5th	Black Eyed Peppa	1	8-1	29.91	Michael J O'Donovan
6th	Droopys Cabaye	6	9-2	30.08	Graham Holland

=== UK Category 1 & 2 competitions ===
Competition	Date	Venue	Winning Greyhound	Winning Trainer	Time	SP	Notes
Coral Coronation Cup	Jan 11	Romford	Roswell Romanov	Mark Wallis (Towcester)	35.10	4-5f	
Greyhound Media Group Prestige	Jan 27	Hall Green	Rubys Razzle	Mark Wallis (Towcester)	39.31	3-1	
WJ & JE Cearns Invitation	Jan 31	Central Park	Brinkleys King	Seamus Cahill (Hove)	31.01	9-4	
Silver Salver	Jan 31	Central Park	Clondoty Alex	Mark Wallis (Towcester)	27.72	3-1	
Cearnsport Springbok	Mar 7	Central Park	Yassoo Martin	George Andreas (Central Park)	29.88	8-1	
Racing Post Juvenile	Mar 7	Central Park	Murrys Act	Kevin Boon (Yarmouth)	28.99	12-1	
Ladbrokes Puppy Derby	Mar 16	Monmore	Forest Con	Seamus Cahill (Hove)	28.22	5-2jf	
Coral Golden Sprint	Mar 17	Romford	Clondoty Alex	Mark Wallis (Towcester)	24.09	6-4f	
Calne Racing Arc	Mar 23	Swindon	Garryvoe Bobby	Graham Holland (Ireland)	28.35	11-10f	
Coors Three Steps to Victory	Apr 4	Sheffield	Geelo Sapphire	Carl Perry (Sheffield)	38.86	7-1	
Tiger Loans Gold Cup	Apr 18	Harlow	Rubys Razzle	Mark Wallis (Towcester)	37.69	5-4f	
Golden Crest	Apr 22	Poole	Crossfield Giles	Seamus Cahill (Hove)	26.27	9-2	
Bresmed Northern Sprint	Apr 25	Sheffield	Mashmad Eyebrows	Kevin Hutton (Towcester)	16.09	10-1	
Coral Regency	May 3	Hove	Tyrap Dragi	Jason Heath (Hove)	41.94	8-1	
Betfred Gymcrack	May 16	Kinsley	Cometwopass	Peter Cronin (Ireland)	27.18	11-10f	
Star Sports Champion Hurdle	Jul 1	Towcester	Ballymac Manix	Seamus Cahill (Hove)	28.92	28-1	
British Bred Produce Stakes	Jul 22	Swindon	King Elvis	Liz McNair (Private)	28.74	1-1f	
Betfred Select Stakes	Jul 26	Nottingham	Dorotas Wildcat	Kevin Hutton (Towcester)	29.61	5-4f	
Coral Sussex Cup	Aug 3	Hove	Shaneboy Freddie	Kevin Boon (Yarmouth)	29.94	9-2	
George Curtis Trafalgar Cup	Aug 17	Monmore	King Elvis	Liz McNair (Private)	27.96	4-6f	
Ladbrokes Summer Stayers Classic	Aug 17	Monmore	Buckos Lass	Corren Price (Monmore)	38.00	16-1	
Ladbrokes Gold Cup	Aug 17	Monmore	Droopys Buick	Angela Harrison (Newcastle)	27.63	5-4f	
William Hill Peterborough Derby	Aug 23	Peterborough	Hiya Butt	Hayley Keightley (Private)	25.77	1-2f	
Lowther Stakes	Aug 27	Towcester	Geelo Sapphire	Carl Perry (Sheffield)	29.36	9-1	
GMG Puppy Classic	Aug 28	Nottingham	Wildfire Lord	Paul Young (Romford)	29.66	12-1	
Coral Champion Stakes	Aug 30	Romford	Murrys Act	Kevin Boon (Yarmouth)	35.15	5-2jf	
Betfred Steel City Cup	Sep 5	Sheffield	Tynwald Baz	Lawrence Tuffin (Nottingham)	28.79	6-4f	
Doncaster St Leger	Sep 13	Doncaster	Keplar Nine	Charlie Lister OBE (Private)	41.36	5-1	
Ladbrokes Gold Collar	Sep 26	Crayford	Mayshighlandreel	Martyn Wiley (Romford)	33.09	5-2jf	
Ladbrokes Guys and Dolls	Sep 26	Crayford	Pure Placere	Arun Green (Crayford)	23.09	3-1cf	
Romford Puppy Cup	Sep 29	Romford	Roxholme Nidge	Hayley Keightley (Private)	23.70	2-5f	
Cearnsport Kent Derby	Oct 3	Central Park	Bockos Alfie	Patrick Janssens (Towcester)	28.84	12-1	
William Hill All England Cup	Oct 19	Newcastle	Droopys Expert	Angela Harrison (Newcastle)	28.10	6-4f	
William Hill Northern Puppy Derby	Oct 19	Newcastle	Droopys Zephyr	Angela Harrison (Newcastle)	28.50	8-1	
BAPP Group Scurry Cup	Oct 21	Belle Vue	Roxholme Hat	Hayley Keightley (Private)	14.82	1-1f	
BAPP Group Northern Flat	Oct 21	Belle Vue	Dropzone	Elaine Parker (Sheffield)	28.10	6-4f	
British Breeders Stakes	Oct 24	Nottingham	Candlelight Fire	Elaine Parker (Sheffield)	29.70	9-4	
RPGTV Henlow Derby	Oct 29	Henlow	King Elvis	Liz McNair (Private)	27.11	6-4f	
Coral Brighton Belle	Nov 9	Hove	Away Shelly	Matt Dartnall (Towcester)	29.85	5-4f	
Betfred Eclipse	Nov 21	Nottingham	Bubbly Bluebird	Paul Young (Romford)	29.62	4-1	
British Bred Derby	Nov 29	Towcester	King Elvis	Liz McNair (Private)	29.46	9-4	
Jay & Kay Coach Tours Kent St Leger	Dec 9	Crayford	Maireads Ivy	Derek Knight (Hove)	45.28	2-1f	
National Sprint	Dec 18	Nottingham	Queen Anna	Liz McNair (Private)	17.83	9-4	
Coral Olympic	Dec 28	Hove	Bruisers Bullet	Mark Wallis (Towcester)	29.90	6-4f	
Essex Vase+	Mar 16	Romford	Murrys Act	Kevin Boon (Yarmouth)	35.34	2-1	

+ held in 2018

=== Irish feature competitions ===
Competition	Date	Venue	Winning Greyhound	Winning Trainer	Time	SP	Notes
Best Car Parks Gold Cup	Feb 11	Shelbourne	Cancelled				
GMHD.ie Juvenile Classic	Mar 3	Tralee	Paradise Marco	Sean Meade	29.20	4-1	
Wallace & Murray Cesarewitch	Apr 8	Mullingar	Vivaro Swift	Kenneth Busteed	33.23	2-1f	
McCalmont Cup	Apr 14	Kilkenny	Karlow Crean	Henry Kelly	29.08	7-2	
Gain Open 600	May 6	Shelbourne	Cancelled				
Kerry GAA Race of Champions	Jun 16	Tralee	Killinan Rosie	Pat Buckley	29.62	7-1	
Gain Corn Cuchulainn	Jul 28	Shelbourne	Airmount Tess	Gerald Kiely	41.80	4-5f	
Thurles Fresh Milk Tipperary Cup	Aug 12	Thurles	Crohane Ronnie	Declan Byrne	28.68	5-2	
Bar One Racing Irish Sprint Cup	Aug 18	Dundalk	Heisman	Laurence Jones	20.96	3-1	
Texacloth Juvenile Derby	Sep 15	Newbridge	Man Twenty One	Brendan Maunsell	28.37		
Gain Feeds Select Stakes	Nov 11	Waterford	Lughill Robbie	Graham Holland	28.56	3-1	
Greyhound & Petworld Luxury Transport Grand National	Dec 16	Cork	Offshore Bound	Patrick Fitzgerald	29.07	2-1	
