= British Breeders Stakes =

Greyhound race

- Class: Category 1
- Location: Nottingham Greyhound Stadium
- Inaugurated: 1983
- Sponsor: BGBF

Race information
- Distance: 500 metres
- Surface: Sand
- Purse: £12,500 (winner)

The British Breeders Stakes formerly known as Produce Stakes is a greyhound racing competition held annually at Nottingham Greyhound Stadium. It was originally known as the British Breeders Forum Produce Stakes.

It was inaugurated in 1982 at Harringay Stadium but has moved home several times. Following the closure of Harringay in 1987 the competition switched to Wembley. In 1993 a Madonna concert forced the event to be switched to sister track Hall Green Stadium where it stayed until 2008. The Greyhound Racing Association allowed Nottingham to have the competition rights from 2009.

== Venues ==
- 1983–1987 (Harringay, 475 metres)
- 1988–1992 (Wembley, 490 metres)
- 1993–2008 (Hall Green, 480 metres)
- 2009–2025 (Nottingham, 500 metres)

== Past winners ==
Year	Winner	Breeding	Trainer	Time (sec)	SP	Notes/ref
1983	Glatton Grange	Mulcair Rocket – Pencil Slim	Kenny Linzell (Walthamstow)	28.68	8/11f	
1984	Queen Lisa	Maplehurst Star – Tyrean	Eric Pateman (Wimbledon)	28.72	13/2	
1985	Fearless Champ	Special Account – Sarahs Bunny	Geoff De Mulder (Oxford)	28.64	8/11f	
1986	Westmead Cannon	Glenroe Hiker – Westmead Rhythm	Nick Savva (Milton Keynes)	28.53	10/11f	
1987	Able Sam	Special Account – Disco Stardust	Sylvia Houlker (Norton Canes)	28.56	5/2	
1988	Decoy Regan Lass	Ballyregan Bob – Decoy Lassie	Mrs D Lucas (Private)	29.21	11/4	
1989	Cannongrand	Cannonroe – Tinahue Miss	Mel Bass (Henlow)	29.08	7/1	
1990	Phantom Flash	Flashy Sir – Westmead Seal	Nick Savva (Milton Keynes)	28.94	1/2f	
1991	El Tigre	Ballyregan Bob – Kalamity Kelly	Derek Knight (Hove)	29.52	2/1jf	
1992	Westmead Spirit	Daleys Gold – Westmead Move	Nick Savva (Private)	29.39	3/1	
1993	Magical Piper	Amenhotep – Tobys Delight	Linda Mullins (Walthamstow)	28.91	9/4jf	
1994	Westmead Merlin	Murlens Slippy – Westmead Hannah	Nick Savva (Walthamstow)	28.33	11/8f	
1995	Staplers Jo	Dempsey Duke – Perfect Rhythm	Nick Savva (Walthamstow)	28.49	1/5f	
1996	Batsford Blade	Murlens Abbey – Classy Colleen	Daphne Mann (Swindon)	28.69	5/1	
1997	Hedsor Kurt	Frightful Flash – Westmead Hannah	Keith Howard (Reading)	28.53	7/4f	
1998	Wrestin Cool	Russian Fox – Coolroe Joan	Joanne Page (Milton Keynes)	28.71	4/1	
1999	Back Seat Billy	Daleys Denis – Magical Magoo	John Coleman (Walthamstow)	28.95	6/5f	
2000	Hes Nobodys Fool	Toms The Best – Westmead Lynx	Pete Ruddick (Poole)	28.36	7/4f	
2001	Willie Go Fa	Plasterscene Gem – Alisons Beauty	Brian Clemenson (Hove)	28.54	7/1	
2002	Abbeyfeale Ebony	Small Fortune – Try Again Alice	Russell Samson (Private)	28.72	5/4f	
2003	Perchancetodream	Mustang Jack – Time To Dream	Dilys Steels (Peterborough)	28.65	4/5f	
2004	Paint Spot	Sonic Flight – Caloona Hustle	Valerie Green (Nottingham)	28.91	4/6f	
2005	Westmead Hawk	Sonic Flight – Mega Delight	Nick Savva (Private)	28.44	4/11f	
2006	Dilemmas Flight	Droopys Vieri – Early Flight	Nick Savva (Private)	28.29	9/4	
2007	Feel Free	Droopys Kewell – Road Princess	Richard Baker (Coventry)	28.60	14/1	
2008	Bomber Blue	Droopys Vieri – Blakes Magic	Paul Sallis (Hall Green)	28.58	11/2	
2009	Greenacre Josh	Hondo Black – Greenacre Lin	Brian Clemenson (Hove)	30.36	6/1	
2010	Saint Jack	Fear Haribo – Simple Pleasure	Brendan Harris (Private)	29.92	16/1	
2011	Go Go Sonic	Droopys Maldini – Farloe Fixture	Paul Sallis (Hall Green)	29.87	4/1	
2012	Romeo Recruit	Bombastic Shiraz – Fabulous March	David Firmager (Nottingham)	29.61	4/9f	
2013	Adageo Bob	Hondo Black – Blonde Pearl	Mark Wallis (Yarmouth)	29.72	6/4f	
2014	Swansalona Diva	College Causeway – Odell Faith	Kevin Hutton (Swindon)	29.63	10/1	
2015	Eden The Kid	Westmead Hawk – Cabra Jade	Liz McNair (Private)	29.59	2/7f	
2016	Badabing	Kinloch Brae – Ardine Lunar	John Mullins (Yarmouth)	29.94	8/1	
2017	Candlelight Fire	Ballymac Vic – Droopys Peaches	Elaine Parker (Sheffield)	29.70	9/4	
2018	Let Me Tell You	Kinloch Brae – Coolavanny Cushy	Angie Kibble (Swindon)	29.96	9/2	
2019	Romeo Rumble	Rumble Impact – Fabulous Pin	John Mullins (Yarmouth)	29.77	12/1	
2020	No race (due to COVID-19 pandemic)					
2021	King Louis	Leamaneigh Turbo – Queen Asia	Liz McNair (Private)	29.63	9/2	
2022	Signet Otis	Magical Bale – Forest Natalee	Kevin Hutton (Towcester)	30.05	9/4	
2023	Romeo Command	Dorotas Wildcat – Drive On Betsy	Patrick Janssens (Towcester)	29.86	2/7f	
2024	Acomb Felix	Hiya Butt – Acomb Ruby	Kevin Ferguson (Kinsley)	30.30	4/1	
2025	Romeo Control	Romeo Recruit – Fabulous Verona	Diane Henry (Towcester)	29.69	14/1	
