= Ravenswood Flo =

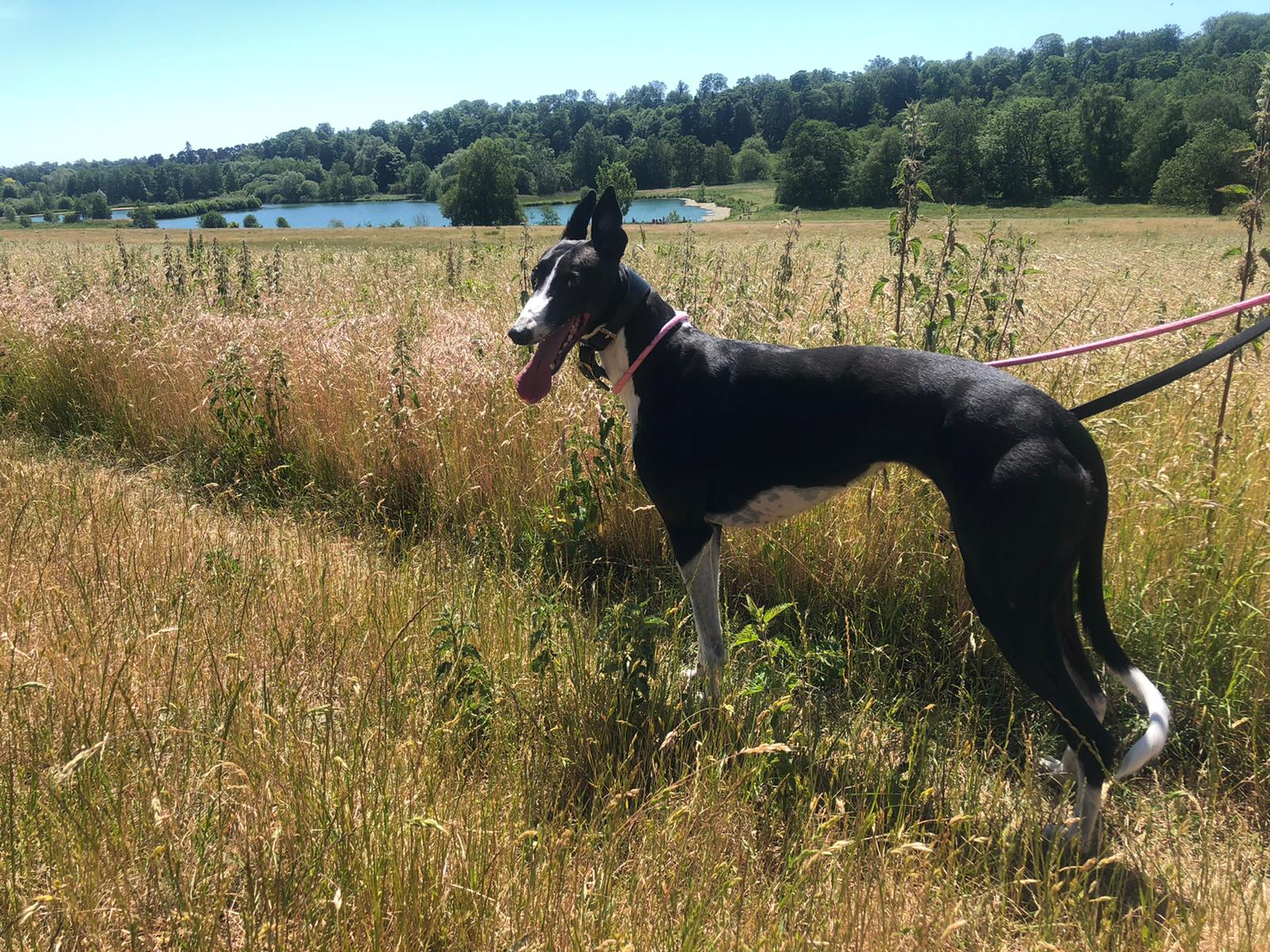
- Ravenswood Flo, pictured in 2020
- Sire: Laughil Blake
- Dam: Ravenswood May
- Sex: Bitch
- Whelped: 1 March 2016
- Died: 26 October 2023
- Colour: Black and white
- Owner: Stephen Harvey
- Trainer: Kevin Hutton

Honours
- 2018 Oaks champion

Ravenswood Flo (1 March 2016 – 26 October 2023) was a black and white female greyhound. She won the 2018 Oaks, one of the original classic greyhound competitions.

== Early life ==
Ravenswood Flo was sired by Laughil Blake from the dam Ravenswood May and was born on 1 March 2016. She was bred by the Barber family and subsequently reared and schooled by Paddy and Margaret Kehoe at the Forest kennels.

== Racing career ==
=== Early career ===
Following three trial runs at Towcester Stadium in January 2018, Ravenswood Flo made her competitive racing debut at the same track in an A6 on 27 January 2018. She won the race, run over 480 metres, in 28.85 seconds. This was followed up by a second successive victory; this time in an A5 race on 9 February 2018. Having achieved two further first-place finishes at A6 and A3 grade during the middle months of the year, she sprained her hock in August 2018 and consequently did not race again until November 2018.

=== Bedfordshire Oaks runner-up ===
On her return from the 79-day break, Ravenswood Flo was entered into the Bedfordshire Oaks at Henlow Stadium. She navigated her way to the final of the competition and finished as a 14–1 runner-up to Mustang Kay Cee, losing by a neck to the dog who had also beaten her in their semi-final heat a week earlier. In the same race, she finished ahead of third-placed Bull Run Byte, who would ultimately go on to win the 2019 Oaks. Trainer Kevin Hutton stated he was pleased with Ravenswood Flo's recovery from the injury that she had sustained earlier in the year.

=== 2018 Oaks champion ===
"Flo came right at the perfect time at Swindon. She’d recovered from a sprained hock to run well at Henlow and then just improved with each run in the Oaks. Her performance in the final was brilliant – a great show of front-running with terrific early speed."

— Trainer Kevin Hutton, on Ravenswood Flo's 2018 Oaks victory in December 2018.

After two solo trials and having run in a further two-dog trial at Swindon, Ravenswood Flo was entered into the 2018 Oaks, also held at Swindon, in December 2018. In the first-round heat of the competition on 2 December 2018, she finished in second place to the competition-favourite, Donation, and therefore qualified for the next round. In the second-round six days later, she led and made all from race-favourite Cadburys Hero in 29.42 seconds. She secured her place in the final by finishing in second place to Chubbys Caviar in the second semi-final on 15 December 2018. After qualifying for the final of one of the original classic competitions, Hutton spoke about Flo's "rapid improvement", highlighting her rise from mid-grade level at Towcester to finishing as Bedfordshire Oaks runner-up and then in-turn qualifying for the final of a classic. Hutton also stated Flo "had taken well to Swindon", whilst also accepting that she "very much has to lead to win".

The 2018 Oaks final took place on 22 December 2018, with Ravenswood Flo winning the race in a time of 28.82 seconds. She led throughout the race from trap one and crossed the line one-and-a-quarter lengths clear of the staying-on Magical Vera, also managed by the same trainer–owner combination of Hutton and Stephen Harvey. Following Flo's victory, her rise from "A6 company at Towcester to winning a classic, the English Oaks at Swindon" was highlighted. Due to her Oaks success, she was nominated for Press Association Bitch of the Year for 2018 at the Greyhound Board of Great Britain end-of-year awards ceremony, which was ultimately won by Donation.

=== Retirement ===
Following on from her Oaks triumph, Flo was considered for retirement having nursed a number of niggling injuries throughout 2018. Hutton felt that if Flo had a quiet year for most of 2019 that she could return to Swindon to defend her Oaks crown at the end of the year. She raced once in the first half of the year and then went on to win an open race at Harlow Stadium in July 2019. However, her sprained hock returned in the run up to the 2019 Oaks and she retired at the end of the year. Upon departing the kennels to live with her owner and family in December 2019, Hutton stated that Flo was "a real kennel favourite and has the most loving and mischievous personality". In her retirement, Flo enjoyed going on walks and spending all day with her family. She died on 26 October 2023 as a result of kidney failure. With her sweet and kind nature, Flo was described by her owner as "wonderful on the track but even more wonderful as a pet".

== Pedigree ==
Gun Law Osti
Brett Lee
Sobbing Sal
Laughil Blake
Digital
Laughil Lass
Must Fly
Ravenswood Flo
Droopys Kewell
Droopys Scolari
Little Diamond UK
Ravenswood May
Royal Impact
Forest May
Smooth Rhythm
