= Trainers Championship (greyhounds) =

UK greyhound event

Trainers' Championship Trainers' Judgement Night
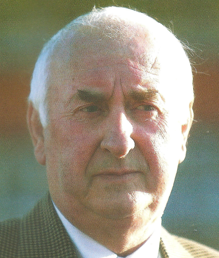
- Charlie Lister OBE (6 times winner)
- Class: Feature
- Inaugurated: 1977
- Sponsor: Premier Greyhound Racing

Race information
- Distance: Various distances over six races
- Surface: Sand
- Qualification: Six leading trainers based on points accumulated throughout the previous year.

The Trainers' Championship currently rebranded as the Trainers' Judgement Night is a competition for the leading greyhound trainers in the United Kingdom.

== History ==
The competition was inaugurated in 1977 at (Brough Park) and is contested by the six leading trainers based on points gained from open race success from the previous year.

The competition should not be confused with the Greyhound Trainer of the Year which is awarded to the trainer who achieves the most points for winning open races on the Greyhound Board of Great Britain annual racing calendar. The 2020 edition was cancelled due to the COVID-19 pandemic and when it returned in 2021 it was rebranded as the Trainers' Judgement Night following sponsorship by Arc & Entain. The new format was similar but saw a reduction from eight races to six.

== Sponsors ==
- 1977–1979 (Ladbrokes)
- 2021–2021 (Arc/Entain)
- 2022–2025 (Premier Greyhound Racing)

== Past winners ==
Year	Winner	Championship Venue	Notes/ref
1977	Natalie Savva & Geoff De Mulder	(Brough Park)	tied
1978	Ted Dickson	(Monmore)	
1979	John Honeysett	(Crayford & Bexleyheath)	
1980	Ted Dickson	(Crayford & Bexleyheath)	
1981	Joe Cobbold	(Crayford & Bexleyheath)	
1982	Adam Jackson	(White City - London)	
1983	Natalie Savva	(White City - London)	
1984	George Curtis	(White City - London)	
1985	Kenny Linzell	(Walthamstow)	
1986	Kenny Linzell	(Wembley)	
1987	Geoff De Mulder	(Wembley)	
1988	Ernie Gaskin Sr.	(Walthamstow)	
1989	John McGee Sr.	(Oxford)	
1990	Bill Masters	(Hove)	
1991	Linda Mullins	(Reading)	
1992	John McGee Sr.	(Reading)	
1993	Linda Mullins	(Walthamstow)	
1994	John Coleman	(Walthamstow)	
1995	John Coleman	(Wimbledon)	
1996	Ernie Gaskin Sr.	(Hackney)	
1997	Linda Mullins	(Walthamstow)	
1998	Ernie Gaskin Sr.	(Sittingbourne)	
1999	Linda Jones	(Walthamstow)	
2000	Nick Savva	(Sittingbourne)	

Year	Winner	Championship Venue	Notes
2001	Charlie Lister	(Hove)	
2002	Brian Clemenson	(Hove)	
2003	Brian Clemenson	(Sittingbourne)	
2004	Brian Clemenson	(Coventry)	
2005	Charlie Lister OBE	(Perry Barr)	
2006	Mark Wallis	(Wimbledon)	
2007	Charlie Lister OBE	(Hall Green)	
2008	Seamus Cahill	(Wimbledon)	
2009	Charlie Lister OBE	(Sheffield)	
2010	Mark Wallis	(Doncaster)	
2011	Charlie Lister OBE	(Wimbledon)	
2012	Nick Savva	(Perry Barr)	
2013	Charlie Lister OBE	(Yarmouth)	
2014	Paul Young	(Sheffield)	
2015	Kevin Hutton	(Sittingbourne)	
2016	Kevin Hutton	(Sittingbourne)	
2017	Kevin Hutton	(Towcester)	
2018	Mark Wallis	(Towcester)	
2019	Angela Harrison	(Sheffield)	
2020	Cancelled due to COVID-19 pandemic		
2021	Kevin Hutton	(Nottingham)	New name
2022	Mark Wallis	(Monmore)	
2023	Patrick Janssens	(Perry Barr)	
2024	Liz McNair	(Hove)	
2025	Mark Wallis	Perry Barr	

== Trainers with 3 or more titles ==
Name	Titles
Charlie Lister	6
Mark Wallis	5
Nick & Natalie Savva	4
Kevin Hutton	4
Ernie Gaskin Sr.	3
Brian Clemenson	3
