= Race of Champions (Irish greyhounds) =

Competition in Ireland

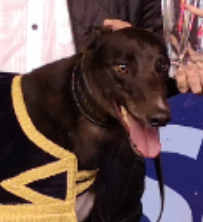
- Slippy Cian
- Class: Feature
- Location: Kingdom Greyhound Stadium
- Inaugurated: 2008
- Sponsor: Denis Murphy

Race information
- Distance: 550 yards
- Surface: Sand
- Purse: €15,000 (winner)

The Race of Champions is a greyhound racing competition held annually at the Kingdom Greyhound Stadium in Tralee, County Kerry, Ireland.

== Race history ==
It was inaugurated in 2008 and therefore is a relatively new event but due to the significant winners prize money on offer stands as a feature event in the Irish racing calendar. The event offers one of the richest prizes for a one-off race. In 2019, the competition was sponsored by Navillus and previous to that was sponsored by Boylesports and served as a major fundraiser for the Kerry GAA training fund, while showcasing how the greyhound industry plays a pivotal role in the local community.

The event has been won a record five times by Graham Holland.

== Venues and distances ==
- 2008-present (Tralee 550y)

== Sponsors ==
- 2008–2011 (Paddy O'Sullivan)
- 2012–2012 (Betdaq)
- 2013–2017 (Boylesports)
- 2018–2018 (Kerry G.A.A Supporters)
- 2019–2019 (Navillus)
- 2021–2021 (S.I.S)
- 2022–2025 (Denis Murphy)

== Past winners ==
Year	Winner	Breeding	Trainer	SP	Time (sec)	Notes/ref
2008	Melodys Pat	Larkhill Jo – Urla Melody	Pa Fitzgerald	3/1	29.62	Track record
2009	Cash Dream	Crash – A Little Slow	Gerry Holian	6/1	30.49	
2010	Beaming Dilemma	Brett Lee – Beaming Heart	Pat Buckley	8/1	29.66	
2011	Deerfield Music	Ace Hi Rumble – Droopys Bolero	Maurice (Mossy) O’Connor	6/4f	29.52	Track record
2012	Razldazl Rioga	Brett Lee – Razldazl Pearl	Dolores Ruth	9/4f	29.58	
2013	Farloe Trent	Hondo Black – Final Pearl	Pat Buckley	6/1	29.43	Track record
2014	Sidarian Blaze	Kinloch Brae – Silverhill Tina	Graham Holland	5/2	29.57	
2015	Rural Hawaii	Head Bound – Duck Fat	Graham Holland	6/1	29.52	
2016	Paradise Maverick	Royal Impact – Paradise Alanna	Pat Buckley	4/1	29.61	
2017	Killinan Rosie	Brett Lee – Killinan Baby	Pat Buckley	7/1	29.62	
2018	Clonbrien Hero	Razldazl Jayfkay – Trout or Salmon	Graham Holland	5/2	29.99	
2019	Slippy Cian	Crash – Global Liberty	Graham Holland	2/1	29.60	
2020	cancelled due to COVID-19					
2021	Explosive Boy	Good News – Delightful Girl	Patrick Guilfoyle	No SP	29.36	No SP due to COVID-19 pandemic restrictions
2022	Bockos Budsit	Laughil Blake – Matts Monica	Graham Holland	9/2	29.43	
2023	Ballinabola Ed	Confident Rankin – Dolls Lady	Pat Buckley	1/1f	29.23	
2024	Coolavanny Otto	Droopys Sydney – Westwind Jet	Pat Buckley	11/2	29.38	
2025	Seven Beach	Pestana – Whitings Gift	Jennifer O'Donnell	13/8f	29.09	Track record
