= Select Stakes (English greyhound race) =

English greyhound racing competition

The Select Stakes
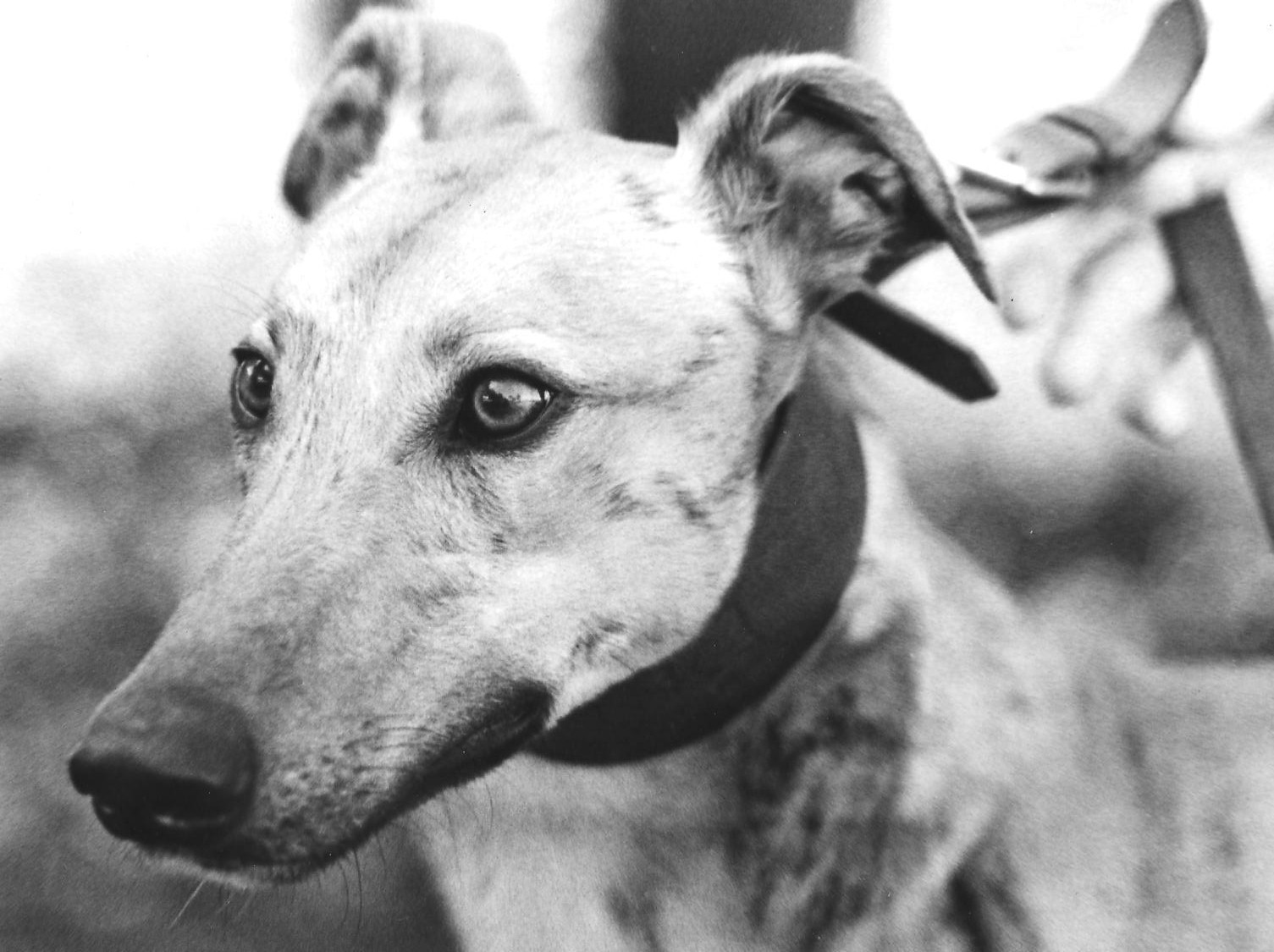
- Fearless Action, 1986 winner
- Class: Invitation
- Location: Nottingham Stadium
- Inaugurated: 1952
- Sponsor: ARC

Race information
- Distance: 500 metres
- Surface: Sand
- Qualification: Invitation only
- Purse: £12,500 (winner)

The Select Stakes is a greyhound competition held at Nottingham Greyhound Stadium. It was run at Wembley Stadium from 1952 until 1996. When the Wembley Greyhounds ended, it moved to Nottingham in 1997. This was after the closure of the greyhounds at Wembley.

In 2022, new sponsors JenningsBet increased the winner's prize to £10,000.

== Venues and distances ==
- 1952–1974 (Wembley, 525 yards)
- 1975–1996 (Wembley, 490 metres)
- 1997–present (Nottingham, 500 metres)

== Sponsors ==
- 1983–1989 (Courage)
- 1991–1994 (Fosters)
- 1996–1996 (Tony Morris Bookmakers)
- 1998–1998 (Racing Post)
- 2001–2002 (Victor Chandler)
- 2003–2004 (Ladbrokes)
- 2005–2017 (Betfred)
- 2018–2019 (Racing Post Greyhound TV)
- 2021–2021 (Arena Racing Company)
- 2022–2024 (JenningsBet)
- 2025–2025 (Arena Racing Company)

== Past winners ==
Year	Winner	Breeding	Trainer	Time (sec)	SP	Notes/ref
1952	Ballylanigan Tanist	Mad Tanist - Fly Dancer	Leslie Reynolds (Wembley)	29.23	11/8	
1953	Endless Gossip	Priceless Border - Narrogar Ann	Leslie Reynolds (Wembley)	29.68	5/1	
1954	Rushton Mac	Rushton News - Rushton Panda	Frank Johnson (Private)	29.34	10/1	
1955	Duet Leader	Champion Prince - Derryluskin Lady	Tom 'Paddy' Reilly (Walthamstow)	29.77	5/4jf	
1956	Duet Leader	Champion Prince - Derryluskin Lady	Tom 'Paddy' Reilly (Walthamstow)	29.26	11/4	
1957	Ford Spartan	Polonius - Harrow Glamour	Dennis Hannafin (Wimbledon)	29.18	9/4	
1958	Mile Bush Pride	The Grand Champion - Witching Dancer	Jack Harvey (Wembley)	29.12	5/2	
1959	Mile Bush Pride	The Grand Champion - Witching Dancer	Jack Harvey (Wembley)	29.11	2/5f	
1960	Clonalvy Pride	Solar Prince - Asmena	Jack Harvey (Wembley)	29.02	11/8f	
1961	Oregon Prince	Knock Hill Chieftain - Burleighs Fancy	Phil Rees Sr. (Private)	29.29	2/5f	
1962	Dromin Glory	Hi There - Dromin Jet	John Bassett (Clapton)	29.23	4/1	
1963	Lucky Boy Boy	Super Man - Grange Maiden	John Bassett (Clapton)	29.30	3/1f	
1964	Pineapple Joe	Clopook - Sight Unseen	Dennis Hannafin (Wimbledon)	28.93	3/1	
1965	Geddy's Empress	Tiny's Trousseau - Her Past	Bill Kelly (Clapton)	29.02	11/2	
1966	Dusty Trail	Printers Present - Dolores Daughter	Paddy Milligan (Private)	29.20	4/5f	
1967	Carry On Oregon	Oregon Prince - Gormanstown Wonder	Clare Orton (Wimbledon)	29.15	13-8f	
1968	Butchers Tec	Booked Out - Technician	Ronnie Melville (Wembley)	29.31	9-2	
1969	Valiant Ray	Westpark Quail - Jamboree Judy	Kevin O'Neill (Walthamstow)	29.02	3/1	
1970	Kilronane Jet	Tontine - Jet Hostess	Tom Johnston Sr. (Wembley)	29.07	7/1	
1971	Supreme Fun	Newdown Heather - Top Note	Sid Ryall (Private)	29.19	5/2	
1972	Westmead County	Clonalvy Pride - Cricket Dance	Natalie Savva (Private)	29.23	9/4f	
1973	Say Little	Albany - Newhouse Blue	Colin McNally (Perry Barr)	29.64	7/4f	
1974	Acomb Dot	Little County - April Rise	John Malcolm (Hall Green)	29.20	9-2	
1975	Toms Mor	Toms Pal - Melville Money	Paddy Milligan (Private)	29.21	4/1	
1976	Mutts Silver	The Grand Silver - Simple Pride	Phil Rees Sr. (Wimbledon)	29.22	1/1f	
1977	Huberts Consort	Mortar Light - Harmony Link	Tom 'Paddy' Reilly (Walthamstow)	29.32	13/8f	
1978	Dale Lad	Bright Lad - Kerry Pal	Geoff De Mulder (Hall Green)	29.95	3/1	
1979	Desert Pilot	Tain Mor - Dark Hostess	Geoff De Mulder (Hall Green)	29.46	4/6f	
1980	Desert Pilot	Tain Mor - Dark Hostess	Geoff De Mulder (Hall Green)	29.21	1/1f	
1981	Greenane Metro	Greenane Decca - Pineapple Grand	Arthur Hitch (Private)	29.7	7/2	
1982	Brief Candle	Peruvian Style - Sky Banner	Paddy Hancox (Perry Barr)	29.13	7/4	
1983	Whisper Wishes	Sand Man - Micklem Drive	Mrs Jill Holt (Slough)	29.30	5/2	
1984	Living Trail	Ivy Hall Solo - Elimron	John Honeysett (Wembley)	29.32	66/1	
1985	Ballintubber One	Killaclug Jet - Ballintubber Peg	Kenny Linzell (Walthamstow)	28.96	9/2	
1986	Fearless Action	Ron Hardy - Sarahs Bunny	Geoff De Mulder (Oxford)	28.96	4/5f	
1987	Stouke Whisper	Whisper Wishes - Stouke Playgirl	John Honeysett (Wembley)	29.48	4/1	
1988	Curryhills Gara	Lindas Champion - Moygara Soda	Ernie Gaskin Sr. (Private)	29.10	11-8f	
1989	Yes Speedy	Curryhills Fox - Yes Mam	John McGee Sr. (Private)	28.84	2/1	
1990	Westmead Harry	Fearless Champ - Westmead Move	Nick Savva (Private)	29.30	3/1	
1991	Summerhill Super	Daleys Gold - Tiny Tolcas	John Copplestone (Portsmouth)	29.19	7/4jf	
1992	Pineapple Lemon	Curryhills Lemon - Pineapple Beauty	Michael Compton (Private)	29.35	7/4	
1993	Simply Free	Daleys Gold - Rooskey Critic	Charlie Lister OBE (Private)	29.16	7-1	
1994	Snow Flash	Phantom Flash - Airport Lady	Colin Dolby (Wembley)	29.71	6/1	
1995	Courier Kid	Manx Treasure - Strange Manner	John Coleman (Walthamstow)	29.25	9/2	
1996	Some Picture	Slaneyside Hare - Spring Season	Charlie Lister OBE (Private)	28.91	9/4f	
1997	Larkhill Jo	Staplers Jo - Westmead Flight	Nick Savva (Walthamstow)	30.19	2/1f	
1998	Jaspers Boy	Castlelyons Gem - Polnoon Lane	David Pruhs (Peterborough)	30.29	6/4f	
1999	Jaspers Boy	Castlelyons Gem - Polnoon Lane	David Pruhs (Peterborough)	30.00	11/10f	
2000	Rackethall Jet	Mountleader Peer - Tracys Lady	Patsy Byrne (Wimbledon)	30.45	7/1	
2001	Sonic Flight	Frightful Flash - Westmead Flight	Nick Savva (Private)	30.26	4/11f	
2002	Droopys Rhys	Jamaican Hero - High Knight	Ted Soppitt (Private)	30.42	6/4f	
2003	Droopys Shearer	Droopys Woods - High Knight	Ted Soppitt (Private)	29.85	2/1	
2004	Dairyland Sue	Roanokee - Ciabatta	Pat Rosney (Belle Vue)	29.74	25/1	
2005	Roxholme Girl	Pacific Mile - Gilded Choice	Hayley Keightley (Private)	29.84	8/1	
2006	Cleenas Lady	Hondo Black - Mind The Way	Terry Dartnall (Reading)	29.61	9/2	
2007	Cleenas Lady	Hondo Black - Mind The Way	Terry Dartnall (Reading)	30.09	5/1	
2008	Barnfield on Air	Pacific Mile - Always on Air	Sam Poots (Private)	29.84	5/4f	
2009	Windy Miller	Honcho Classic-Any Time	Pat Rosney (Monmore)	29.69	4/1	
2010	Jordansoilutions	Brett Lee-Miggs	Charlie Lister OBE (Private)	29.90	9/2	
2011	Jordansoilutions	Brett Lee-Miggs	Charlie Lister OBE (Private)	30.07	14/1	
2012	Silverview Perky	Head Bound – Owens Rover	Charlie Lister OBE (Private)	30.34	5/2	
2013	Daddy Knowsbest	Big Daddy Cool – Bridie Knowsbet	Chris Allsopp (Monmore Green)	29.67	8/1	dead-heat
2013	Holdem Spy	Hondo Black – Have One More	Carol Weatherall (Coventry)	29.67	3/1jf	dead-heat
2014	Pay Freeze	Ace Hi Rumble – Ballinclare Dime	Elaine Parker (Sheffield)	29.63	8/1	
2015	Swift Hoffman	Makeshift – Swift Erin	Pat Rosney (Private)	29.63	4/5f	
2016	Domino Storm	Makeshift – Swift Erin	Mark Wallis (Towcester)	29.34	6/1	
2017	Dorotas Wildcat	Ballymac Vic – Droopys Daneel	Kevin Hutton (Towcester)	29.61	5/4f	
2018	Brinkleys Poet	Scolari Me Daddy – Kilara Lizzie	Matt Dartnall (Towcester)	29.56	2/1f	
2019	Trickys Dumbo	Skywalker Puma – Quivers Duchess	Robert Holt (Sheffield)	29.39	3/1	
2020	No race due to (COVID-19 pandemic)					
2021	Signet Ace	Laughil Blake – Forest Natalee	Kevin Hutton (Towcester)	29.72	9/4f	
2022	Brookside Richie	Droopys Sydney – Droopys Greatest	James Fenwick (Newcastle)	29.93	15/8f	
2023	Clona Duke	Malachi – Coolavanny Pearl	Graham Holland (Ireland)	29.49	2/1	
2024	Unanimouspanther	Droopys Sydney – Mystical Moll	Pat Buckley (Ireland)	29.31	3/1	
2025	Wicky Ned	Droopys Sydney – Ballycowen Lucy	James Fenwick (Newcastle)	29.22	11/4jf	
