= Dorotas Wildcat =

Racing greyhound

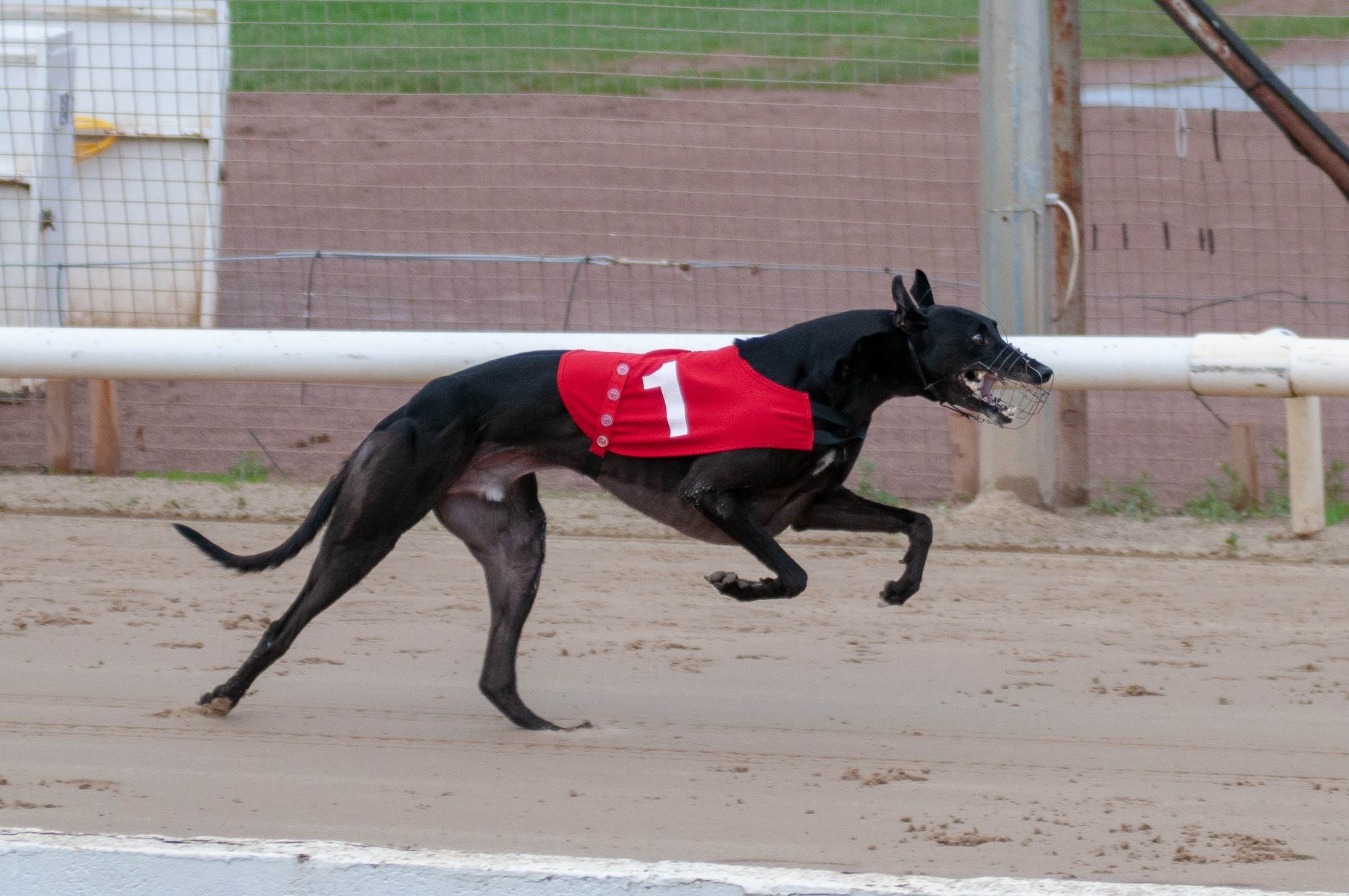
- Dorotas Wildcat, pictured in 2018
- Sire: Ballymac Vic
- Dam: Droopys Danneel
- Sex: Dog
- Whelped: 1 May 2015 (age 9)
- Color: Black
- Breeder: Jim Gurney
- Owner: Kevin Hutton, Donna Witchalls, David Usher
- Trainer: Kevin Hutton

Record
- 2018 English Greyhound Derby; Select Stakes; Eclipse

Honours
- 2018 Greyhound of the Year

Dorotas Wildcat (whelped 1 May 2015) is a retired racing greyhound, trained by Kevin Hutton, known for winning the 2018 English Greyhound Derby. The same year, he was awarded the title of GBGB Greyhound of the Year.

== Early life ==
Dorotas Wildcat was whelped in Kildare, County Kildare, Ireland, on 1 May 2015, out of Ballymac Vic and Droopys Danneel. The litter proved successful, with several of Dorotas Wildcat’s siblings also achieving notable wins, including Dorotas Woohoo, winner of the 2017 Scottish Derby and Forest Natalee, winner of the 2017 Irish Oaks.

== Racing career ==
=== 2017 ===
On 1 July, Dorotas Wildcat won the Star Sports Derby Plate final at Towcester. On 13 November, he won the 2017 Select Stakes at Nottingham before placing second in the Eclipse on 21 November at the same venue, beaten by Bubbly Bluebird.

=== 2018 ===
On 2 June, Dorotas Wildcat won the final of the English Greyhound Derby with a time of 28.85 seconds, beating his littermate, Dorotas Vic, who finished third. On 26 November, he won the Eclipse Stakes in Nottingham. In January 2019, he was awarded the title of GBGB Greyhound of the Year 2018 for his achievements the previous year.

=== 2019 ===
Dorotas Wildcat retired on 22 June at the 2019 English Greyhound Derby at Nottingham, where he reached the semi-final, placing fourth in his final race.

== Pedigree ==
Craigie Mo Town
Kinloch Brae
Greys Free Style
Ballymac Vic
Elite State
Ballymac Vicky
Ballymac Slippy
Dorotas Wildcat
Collision
Rumble Impact
Rumble Ciarrai
Droopys Danneel
Boherduff Light
Droopys Bubble
Droopys Iris
