= 2018 English Greyhound Derby =

Greyhound racing event

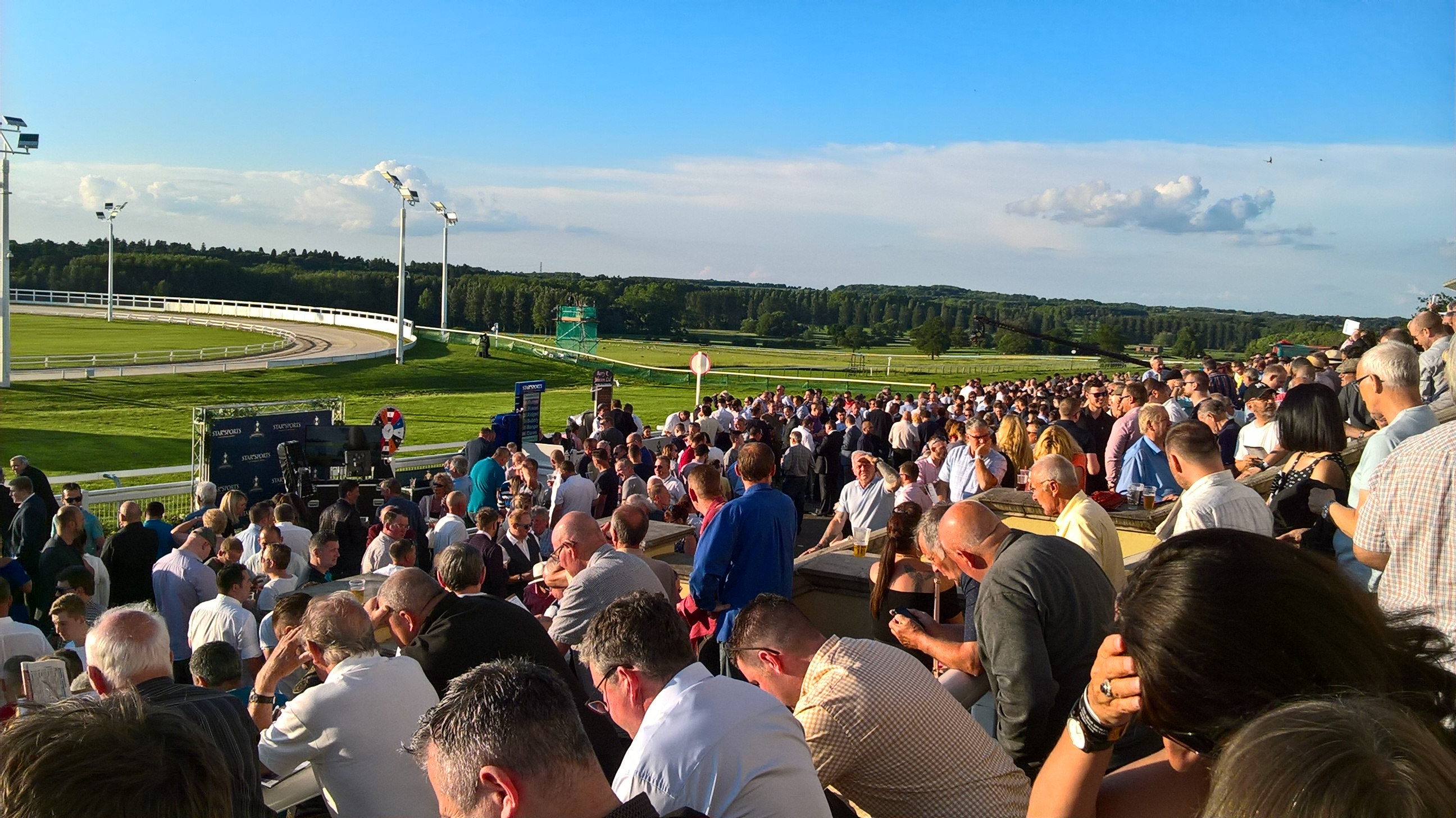
- The betting ring during the Derby final
- Location: Towcester Greyhound Stadium
- Start date: 3 May
- End date: 2 June
- Total prize money: £175,000 (winner)

The 2018 Star Sports Greyhound Derby took place during May and June with the final being held on 2 June 2018 at Towcester Greyhound Stadium. The winner Dorotas Wildcat won £175,000 and was trained by Kevin Hutton, owned by Hutton and Dave Usher and bred by Jim Gurney.

It is the second time that the event was held at Towcester.

== Final Result ==
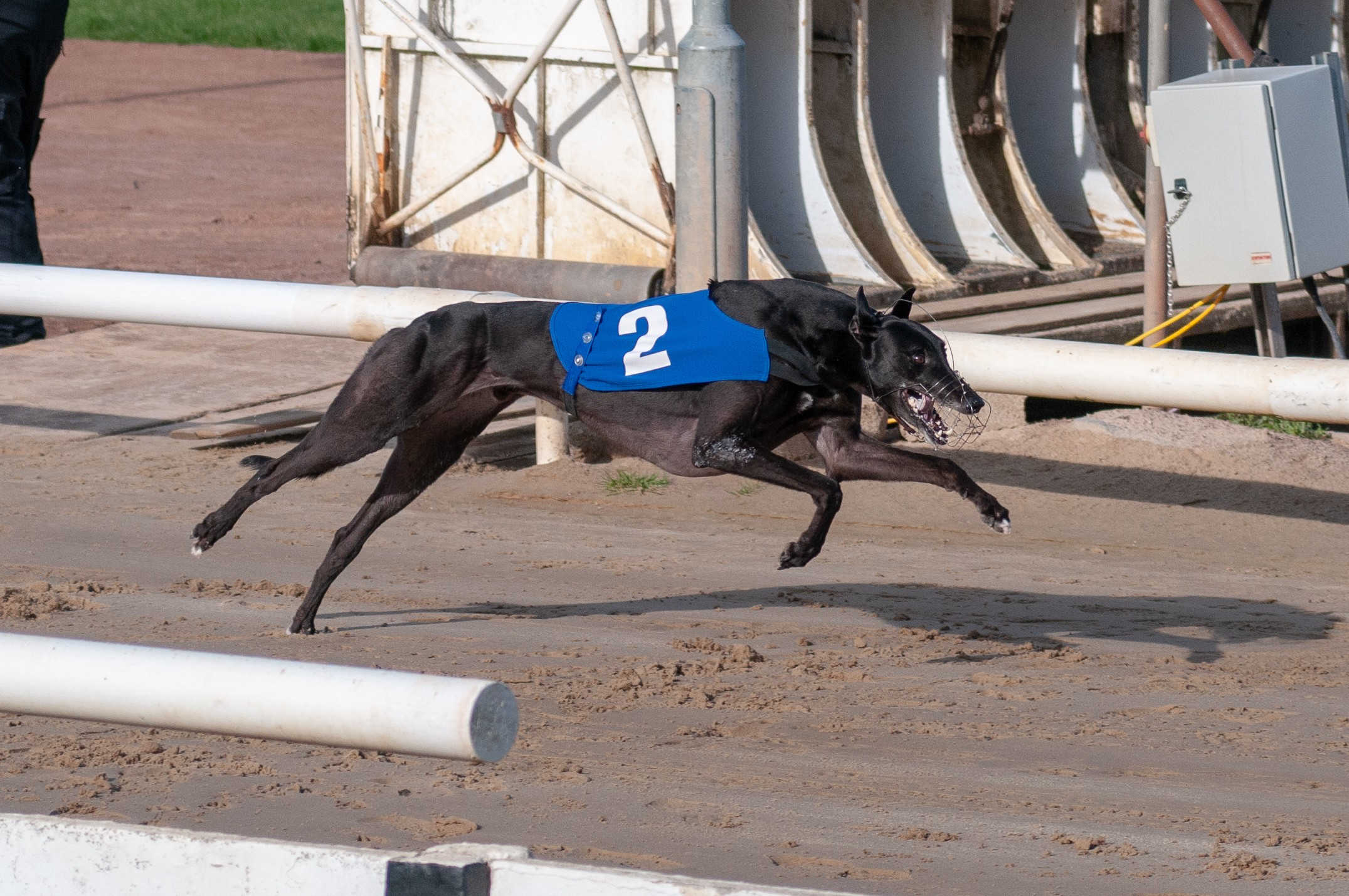
Dorotas Wildcat

At Towcester (over 500 metres): Winner £175,000

Pos	Name of Greyhound	Breeding	Trap	Sectional	Race comment	SP	Time	Trainer
1st	Dorotas Wildcat	Ballymac Vic - Droopys Daneel	3	5.15	Early Pace, Soon Led	2-1	28.85	Kevin Hutton (Towcester)
2nd	Droopys Verve	Loughteen Blanco - Droopys Cyclone	4	5.24	SAw, EP, Ran On	7-4f	28.98	Angela Harrison (Newcastle)
3rd	Dorotas Vic	Ballymac Vic - Droopys Daneel	5	5.18	Quick Away, Wide	20-1	29.03	Charlie Lister (Doncaster)
4th	Bruisers Bullet	Droopys Cain - Clover Bride	2	5.23	Ran On Late	4-1	29.07	Mark Wallis (Towcester)
5th	Bombers Bullet	Droopys Cain - Headford Hoe	1	5.34	Slow Away, Clear Run	10-1	29.25	Mark Wallis (Towcester)
6th	Whoops Jack	Jacksajem - Whoopsadaisy	6	5.22	Wide, Clear Run	5-1	29.36	Peter Cronin (Ireland)

=== Final Distances ===
1½, ¾, ½, 2¼, 1¼ (lengths) 0.08 sec = one length

== Quarter finals ==
Heat 1 (May 22, £1,000)
Pos	Name	SP	Time
1st	Borna Gin (Buckley)	5-2	29.32
2nd	Wildfire Legend (Young)	10-1	29.38
3rd	Oi Oi Upenalty (Keightley)	9-2	29.39
4th	Crossfield Will (Cronin)	6-4f	29.40
5th	Newinn Shadow (Lister)	8-1	29.50
6th	Calico Brandy (Weatherall)	6-1	29.54

Heat 2 (May 22, £1,000)
Pos	Name	SP	Time
1st	Dorotas Wildcat (Hutton)	4-7f	29.17
2nd	Innocent Times (Matthews)	4-1	29.21
3rd	Dorotas Vic (Lister)	10-1	29.32
4th	Bubbly Bluebird (Wallis)	6-1	29.35
5th	Alfies Prince (Denby)	16-1	29.40
6th	King Elvis (McNair)	5-1	29.43

Heat 3 (May 22, £1,000)
Pos	Name	SP	Time
1st	Droopys Verve (Harrison)	1-1f	28.88
2nd	Bruisers Bullet (Wallis)	15-8	29.06
3rd	Saleen Ash (Wallis)	16-1	29.19
4th	Calico Ranger (Weatherall)	8-1	29.23
5th	Droopys Dresden (Simmonds)	10-1	29.83
6th	Karlow Scolar (Collett)	10-1	29.84

Heat 4 (May 22, £1,000)
Pos	Name	SP	Time
1st	Rising Brandy (Dartnall)	10-11f	29.01
2nd	Whoops Jack (Cronin)	3-1	29.32
3rd	Bombers Bullet (Wallis)	9-4	29.37
4th	Jelly Flood (Hutton)	16-1	29.38
5th	Salacres Vincent (Harnden)	50-1	29.66
6th	Noelles Phelpso (Mullins)	20-1	29.83

== Semi finals ==
First Semi-final (May 26, £5,000)
Pos	Name of Greyhound	SP	Time	Trainer
1st	Droopys Verve	4-5f	28.91	Angela Harrison
2nd	Bombers Bullet	9-2	29.25	Mark Wallis
3rd	Dorotas Vic	16-1	29.49	Charlie Lister
4th	Borna Gin	8-1	29.75	Pat Buckley
5th	Saleen Ash	25-1	29.82	Mark Wallis
6th	Rising Brandy	9-4	30.30	Matt Dartnall

Second Semi-final (May 26, £5,000)
Pos	Name of Greyhound	SP	Time	Trainer
1st	Whoops Jack	6-1	29.18	Peter Cronin
2nd	Dorotas Wildcat	11-10f	29.19	Kevin Hutton
3rd	Bruisers Bullet	2-1	29.28	Mark Wallis
4th	Wildfire Legend	33-1	29.41	Paul Young
5th	Innocent Times	9-2	29.42	Brendan Matthews
6th	Oi Oi Upenalty	16-1	29.63	Hayley Keightley

== Competition Review ==
The mandatory first round consisted of 26 heats, with only 35% of the field being eliminated, a percentage that included the 20-1 ante post favourite and All England Cup champion, Droopys Expert, Scottish Greyhound Derby champion The Other Reg and Irish star Clonbrien Hero. Whoops Jack impressed during the first set of heats winning in 29.33 and on the second night Droopys Verve (29.16) and Sporting Dave (29.29) stood out. The final set of heats was the most impressive with wins for Bombers Bullet (29.08), Tyrur Harold (29.29) and Puppy Derby champion Magical Bale (29.07).

Mark Wallis won four of the first eight heats of the second round with Bruisers Bullet going fastest in 29.05. Bombers Bullet, Whoops Jack and Sporting Dave all won well again but Magical Bale crashed out. The remaining second round heats the following evening saw Dorotas Wildcat and Droopys Biker impress in times of 29.07 and 29.16 respectively. Tyrur Harold was eliminated.

Bubbly Bluebird came to life on a fast track in the third round, becoming the first greyhound to break 29 seconds so far when defeating Bombers Bullet by a head in 28.94. This was followed by Irish hound Crossfield Will, Matt Dartnall's Rising Brandy and Dorotas Wildcat who all impressed winning in 28.81, 28.89 and 28.79 respectively. Sporting Dave and Droopys Biker were both eliminated before the final heat saw the youngster Droopys Verve win in 28.76 and maintain his record of finishing in the top two in every race that he had competed in so far.

The real test during the Derby is the quick run from third round to quarter finals and Dorotas Wildcat passed the test with flying colours winning heat 2 in 29.17. This was then topped by Droopys Verve who won in a fast time of 28.88 defeating Bruisers Bullet by 2¼ lengths. Rising Brandy took heat 4 in 29.01.

Droopys Verve impressed again in the semi-finals defeating Bombers Bullet in 28.91. The race saw first bend bumping which left Dorotas Vic to claim the final qualifying spot. In the second semi final the early pace of Whoopys Jack ensured an Irish runner made the final, Dorotas Wildcat and Bruisers Bullet took the remaining final slots.

In the final Dorotas Wildcat made a fast 5.15sec start, which saw him clear of the two greyhounds on his inside, he led all the way comfortably holding off the favourite Droopys Verve. In a clean final Dorotas Vic broke well and held on to third place, Bruisers Bullet ran on well for fourth, Bombers Bullet and Whoops Jack made poor starts and could not recover.

== See also ==
- 2018 UK & Ireland Greyhound Racing Year
