= Angela Harrison =

British greyhound racing professional trainer

Personal information
- Occupation: Greyhound trainer

Sport
- Sport: Greyhound racing

Achievements and titles
- National finals: Classic/Feature wins: All England Cup (2017, 2018); Scurry Gold Cup (2019); Dundalk International (2018); Classic (2017, 2019, 2022); Yorkshire St Leger (2019); Birmingham Cup (2020); Northern Puppy Derby (2017, 2019); Ladbrokes Gold Cup (2017); Ladbrokes Summer Stayers Classic (2021); ARC Grand Prix (2021); Essex Vase (2022); Three Steps to Victory (2022)

Angela Harrison is an English greyhound trainer and winner of the 2019 British Trainers Championship.

== Career ==
Prior to 1997, Harrison worked for Graham Calvert before joining the North View Kennels of Paul Rutherford, who was contracted to Newcastle Stadium (known as Brough Park at the time). Harrison then worked as Assistant Trainer to Jimmy Wright (a former St Johnstone footballer) and was part of the team that won a number of major races and trained stars such as Droopys Buick, the 2016 Greyhound of the Year.

In 2017, Harrison took over the trainers licence and Newcastle Stadium contract from Jimmy Wright and the pair run Alnwick greyhounds which is based at Greensfield Moor Farm in Northumberland. Since 2017, the kennel has won numerous events with the stand out performers being Droopys Verve who finished runner-up in the 2018 English Greyhound Derby and Droopys Expert who reached the 2019 English Greyhound Derby final.

The kennels most significant moment came on 6 April 2019, when Harrison secured the 2019 Trainers Championship at Sheffield.

In 2025, Harrison's partner Jimmy Wright died after being diagnosed with motor neurone disease.
