= Yarmouth Stadium =

Stadium in Yarmouth, England

Coordinates: 52.6372°N 1.727°E

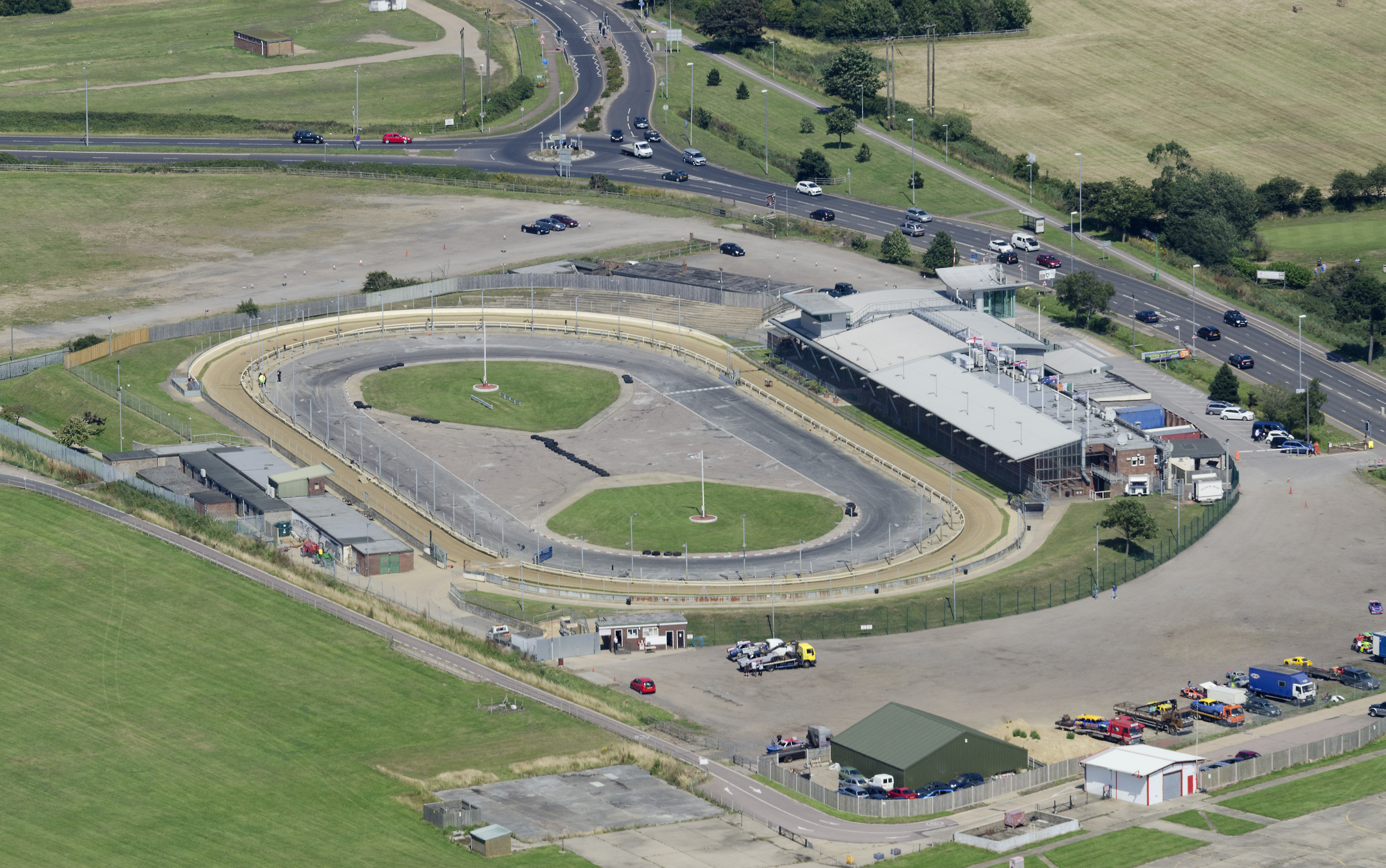
- Yarmouth Stadium in 2015
- Interactive map of Yarmouth Stadium
- Location: Yarmouth Road, Caister-on-Sea, Great Yarmouth, Norfolk NR30 5TE

Construction
- Opened: 1940

Website
- Official website

Yarmouth Stadium is a greyhound racing track located at Caister-on-Sea in the Borough of Great Yarmouth and English county of Norfolk. It is licensed by the Greyhound Board of Great Britain.

Greyhound Racing takes place every Monday, Wednesday and Sunday morning, as well as occasional Saturday evenings. Facilities include a modern designed 'Raceview Restaurant' seating 240, several executive suites, fast food facilities and a number of bars.

== Speedway ==
Speedway arrived in 1948 running until 1961; Ernie Wedon became the manager of the speedway team called 'Yarmouth Bloaters' throughout this period.

== Stock Car racing ==
The stadium has continually run Stock Car racing since the 1960s and boasted its own team in the 1966 and 1971/2 team leagues. The 1966 team were nicknamed the Bloaters whilst the later outfit were known as the Greyhounds.

== Greyhound racing ==
=== Origins & opening ===
In 1928 Len Franklin & Ernie Wedon, both professional gamblers in pre-war London visited the newly built Clapton Stadium. Franklin became a regular at Harringay Stadium, Stamford Bridge and White City Stadium and after investing in stocks and shares they invested in a new venture at Yarmouth. They purchased a field on the west side of the Yarmouth Road that contained a 'flapping' track; this track had opened on Good Friday 25 March 1932 with grass track speedway also held there after starting on 14 July. It was devoid of structures and on the opposite side of the road to the horse racing course.

Franklin & Wedon also leased the adjacent field to enable better access and applied for planning permission for a new stadium. Although the initial planning was refused a subsequent appeal to the ministry saw the decision overturned. Work began in 1939 and the stadium was ready for business by the spring of 1940.

The opening date for the new stadium was set for 11 May 1940 but on that same day the Germans invaded the Netherlands and Belgium resulting in the evacuation of Yarmouth. The opening afternoon meeting still went ahead, as did several other meetings on a weekly basis until most of the staff were called up to serve in the war. The stadium closed and it was taken over by the fire service.

=== Post-war history ===
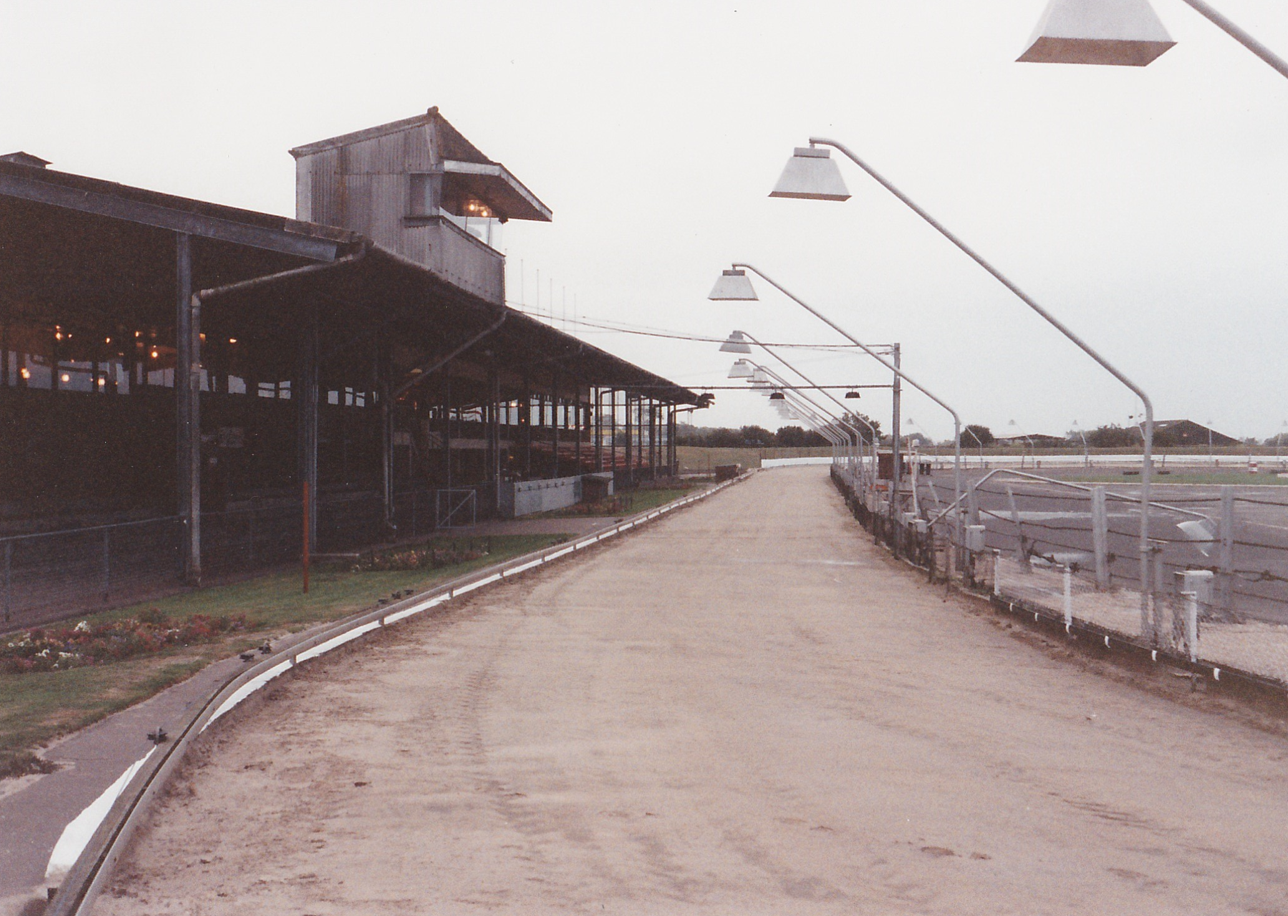
Yarmouth Greyhound Stadium c.1980

After the war Len Franklin and Ernie Wedon went into partnership with Clifford Yaxley forming the Norfolk Greyhound Racing Company and they were able to take advantage of the post war boom opening on Saturday 7 December 1946. The racing was over 500 yards and facilities included a restaurant in the main stand. Franklin was a steward and judge and when Racing Manager Ernie Wedon sold his share to buy Ipswich Stadium. Len Franklin then became Racing Manager.

The East Anglian Derby was inaugurated at the track but this was an independent race (unlicensed) at the time because the track raced with no National Greyhound Racing Club (NGRC) affiliation from 1939 until 1975.

The original field where the flapping track stood was sold and in 1958 would form part of the North Denes Airport, which later became a heliport serving as a private base for helicopters to the gas platforms in the North Sea. After the sudden death of Yaxley the Franklin family took sole control of the stadium, Len was the Racing Manager, his son Stephen was the Kennel Manager and M J Franklin was the General Manager. Race days varied from Tuesday & Friday evenings to Monday, Wednesday & Saturday evenings over distances of 300, 500, 710 & 910 yards. In 1969 the stadium opened a new Raceview Grandstand Restaurant catering for 3,000 people.

In 1975 Yarmouth joined the NGRC permit scheme and in 1985 Dick Keable the Racing Manager celebrated forty years at the track (Keable had been a kennel lad at the track back in 1945). Two years later in 1987 Yarmouth became the first permit track to register a totalisator turnover of £1 million. Stephen Franklin became General Manager taking over from Len Franklin. In addition to the racing there was a Sunday market, stock car racing three times per week, bingo nights and an amusement arcade. Stephen Franklin's wife Pamela and children Simon and Justin all joined the business.

=== Recent history ===
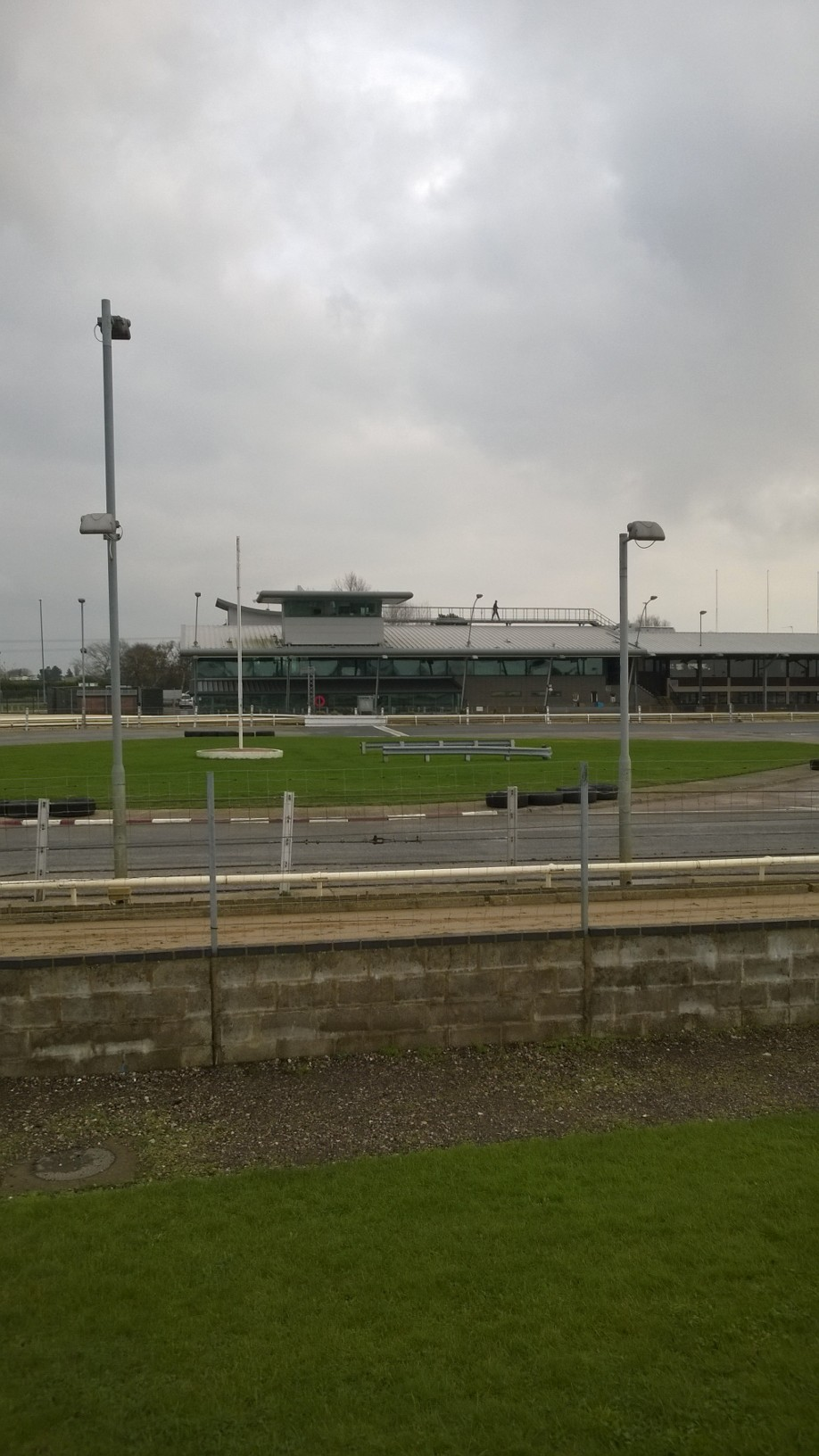
Main grandstand view in 2015

Simon Franklin was appointed Racing Manager and then General Manager after Nigel Long became Racing Manager. Simon & Justin Franklin then brought in Nigel Bray as General Manager whilst they took control of other duties. One of which was overseeing the new £2.5 million grandstand built in 2006, the state of the art 250-seater restaurant and three executive boxes included a plaque naming the building the Len Franklin Grandstand in memory of the co-founder of the stadium. The track hosted the TV Trophy in 2007 & 2013 and the Trainers Championship in 2013. Trainers Mark Wallis and John Mullins joined Yarmouth after the closure of Walthamstow Stadium via Harlow.

Track improvements costing £190,000 were completed in 2012 and Mark Wallis became Champion Trainer 2012 to 2014 as a Yarmouth handler. His 2012 English Greyhound Derby triumph with Blonde Snapper brought the ultimate prize to the track. Yarmouth also runs on the BAGS service overseen by Racing Manager Marcus Westgate who took over in 2012.

In 2018 the stadium signed a media rights contract with ARC to race every Monday and Thursday evening and a new five-year contract extension was agreed to run from January 2025.

=== Competitions ===
- East Anglian Derby
- George Ing St Leger

=== Track records ===
==== Current ====
Metres	Greyhound	Time (sec)	Date	Notes	Ref
277	Quagos Jack	15.87	19 August 2023		
462	Romeo Steel	27.04	10 September 2025	East Anglian Derby Semi Finals	
659	Pavilion Colleen	39.92	11 October 2025		
843	Musical Gaga	52.86	26 August 2013	TV Trophy heats	
1041	Some Moth	68.81	8 December 1990		

==== Former ====
Extended content

Metres	Greyhound	Time (sec)	Date	Notes/Ref
277	Knockrour Brandy	16.64	22 September 1979	
277	Respect	16.50	16 August 2000	
277	Against The Lead	=16.50	16 August 2006	
277	Beardys Robbie	16.46	20 September 2007	
277	Perrys Tango	16.44	13 August 2008	
277	Boherduff Monti	16.40	18 September 2008	
277	Boherduff Monti	16.34	23 September 2008	
277	Rotar Wing	16.33	12 August 2009	
277	Monleek Town	16.19	15 August 2012	
277	Skate On	16.18	18 September 2014	
277	Skate On	16.18	18 September 2014	
277	Broadstrand Kiwi	16.12	16 September 2017	
277	Kilmore Lemon	16.02	21 June 2018	
277	Farneys Trend	15.90	17 June 2023	
462	Ramtogue Dasher	27.91	9 September 1987	
462	Dempsey Duke	27.68	19 September 1991	
462	Geordie Parker	27.52	12 September 2007	East Anglian Derby 2nd round
462	Farloe Reason	27.49	10 September 2008	East Anglian Derby 1st round
462	Ninja Jamie	27.40	2 September 2008	East Anglian Derby final
462	Fear Zafonic	27.27	4 September 2010	East Anglian Derby 1st round
462	Fear Zafonic	27.17	11 September 2010	East Anglian Derby semi final
462	King Elvis	27.17	10 September 2018	East Anglian Derby 2nd Round
659	Dunmurry Girl	40.88	8 March 1972	
659	Big City	40.79	24 September 1988	
659	Masterpiece	40.77	20 September 2007	
659	Rackethall Holly	40.71	31 October 2007	
659	Raving Black	40.54	12 September 2009	
659	Centurion Enry	40.25	16 September 2010	
659	Roxholme Poppy	40.18	13 May 2019	George Ing St Leger semi final
659	Roxholme Poppy	40.07	18 May 2019	George Ing St Leger final
843	Change Guard	53.62	25 August 1986	
843	Spiridon Louis	52.98	23 May 2007	
1041	Dunmurry Ruby	69.15	6 December 1986	
