= Kevin Hutton =

British greyhound racing professional trainer

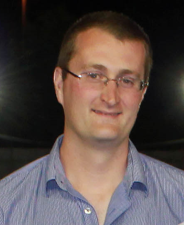

Personal information
- Born: 1981 (age 44–45) Oxford, England
- Occupation: Greyhound trainer

Sport
- Sport: Greyhound racing

Achievements and titles
- National finals: Derby wins: English Derby (2018); Oaks; Classic/Feature wins: (2013, 2018, 2019); Laurels (2022); Puppy Derby (2017, 2018); Select Stakes (2017, 2021); British Breeders Stakes (2014, 2022); British Bred Produce Stakes (2022, 2024); Ladbrokes Summer Stayers Classic (2014, 2020); Steel City Cup (2020); Scurry Gold Cup (2024)

Kevin Richard Hutton (born 1981) is an English greyhound trainer. He is a four times United Kingdom Champion Trainer and 2018 Derby winning trainer.

== Profile ==
Based at Burford, Oxfordshire, Hutton was a trainer at Swindon, when he won the 2013 Oaks with Droopys Danneel and reached several other prominent finals including steering two hounds to the final of the Arc.

He left Swindon to join Towcester Greyhound Stadium when it opened in 2014. Following the closure of Towcester he joined Monmore and was there from August 2018 until May 2021. His biggest individual race successes include the Oaks, Puppy Derby and the Select Stakes. He reached the final of the 2013 English Greyhound Derby with Screen Critic.

The greatest achievement of his career arrived in June 2018 when he won the 2018 English Greyhound Derby with Dorotas Wildcat. He continued to impress throughout 2018 and his victories included the Golden Sprint, Golden Crest, Eclipse and Puppy Derby. He ended the year by securing his second Oaks winner, five years after his first, when Ravenswood Flo won the 2018 Oaks.

Hutton won his third Oaks title in 2019. In May 2021 Hutton returned to train out of Towcester following its reopening and later in September 2021, won his fourth trainers championship (the first as the rebranded Judgement Night).

In 2022, he won the Laurels and the British Bred Produce Stakes for the first time. Hutton joined Oxford Stadium as a trainer in late 2022.

== Awards ==
- Trainers Championship four times in 2015, 2016, 2017, 2021.
- English Greyhound Derby 2018
