= Greyhound Board of Great Britain =

Sports Governing body

The Greyhound Board of Great Britain (GBGB) is the organisation that governs licensed greyhound racing in Great Britain. As of March 2026, it governed the 18 licensed stadiums in England and Wales.

== History ==
It was formed in 2009 as a self-regulating body after a merger between the British Greyhound Racing Board and the National Greyhound Racing Club (NGRC). The GBGB reports to the Department for Digital, Culture, Media & Sport (DCMS) and the Department for Environment, Food & Rural Affairs (DEFRA).

All greyhound-racing stadia and individuals working in the registered sector are subject to the Greyhound Board of Great Britain (GBGB) Rules of Racing and the Directions of the Stipendiary Stewards, who set the standards for greyhound welfare at the racecourses. Stewards’ Inquiries are held both locally and at the London headquarters and disciplinary action is taken against anyone found failing to comply.

On 24 March 2020, the GBGB took the unprecedented step of suspending Greyhound racing in the United Kingdom, due to the COVID-19 pandemic. They pledged financial help to all retired and racing greyhounds within the registered sector. Later in 2020, a 5-step plan was drawn up in order to resume activities in a limited manner, enabling a partial resumption of racing under COVID-19 restrictions.

== Accreditation ==
The GBGB is an independently audited body which is accredited by UKAS. UKAS accreditation requires periodic audit of systems and procedures and is a guarantee that high professional standards are being met. Moreover, the annual independent audit of the GBGB's accounts gives further assurance to the public and to the sport's funding body, the British Greyhound Racing Fund.

== Welfare ==
From 2017, the GBGB published its injury and retirement statistics on an annual basis. It also reiterated its commitment to greyhound welfare.

Greyhound Racing has attracted the interest of animal welfare groups for many years. The GBGB takes part in a number of welfare forums and has good working relations with representatives from other bodies such as the Dogs Trust and Battersea Dogs & Cats Home. They also report on welfare to DEFRA and the All-Party Parliamentary Greyhound Group.

== Regulatory powers ==
Any person in the registered sector is subject to the GBGB Rules of Racing and the Directions of the Stewards, who set the standards for greyhound welfare and racing integrity, from racecourse facilities and trainers' kennels to retirement of greyhounds. There are Stewards' inquiries, and then disciplinary action is taken against anyone found failing to comply.

The GBGB have no regulatory power over people or greyhounds that are not registered with them or over Irish racing and breeding. It does not govern Northern Irish tracks and therefore has no jurisdiction over them and similarly it did not govern independent tracks, (the last of which closed in March 2025).
