= Tipperary Cup =

Irish greyhound racing competition

- Class: Feature
- Location: Thurles Greyhound Stadium
- Inaugurated: 1957
- Sponsor: Centenary Agri

Race information
- Distance: 525 yards
- Surface: Sand
- Purse: €7,200 (winner)

The Tipperary Cup is a greyhound racing competition held annually at Thurles Greyhound Stadium in Thurles, County Tipperary, Ireland.

It was inaugurated in 1957 and is an integral part of the Irish greyhound racing calendar.

== Venues and distances ==
- 1957–1984 (Thurles 525y)
- 1985–1999 (Thurles 550y)
- 2000–2000 (Thurles 525y)
- 2001–2002 (Thurles 550y)
- 2003–present (Thurles 525y)

== Sponsors ==
- 2006–2006 (F.F.K.Sires & Euro Spar)
- 2007–2007 (G Sports & Thurles Fresh Milk)
- 2008–2019 (Thurles Fresh Milk)
- 2020–present (Centenary Agri)

== Past winners ==
Year	Winner	Breeding	Time (sec)	Trainer	SP	Notes/ref
1957	Solar Prince	Champion Prince – Lisabelle	30.10	Ed Brennan	2/5f	
1958	Tanyard Champion	Champion Prince – Knockeevan Tulip	30.55	P J Cashman	7/1	
1959	Trade Grand		30.40	John Tuohy	5/1	
1960	Dolly's Champion	Fourth of July – Dolly's Imperial	30.05	Mick Drennan	5/2	
1961	Jerrys Clipper	Jerry's Special – Glittering Queenie	29.45	Jerry O'Dea	4/6f	Track record
1962	General Courtnowski	Man of Pleasure – Yoblstrap	29.	Malachy McKenna	/	
1963	April Twilight	Solar Prince – The Grand Dancer	29.85			
1964	Good Brandy	Hi There – Donore Mistress	29.55			
1965	Knock Late	Knock Hill Chieftain – Sallys Dreamer	30.10			
1966	Movealong Santa	Champion Tripp – Movealong Sally	30.10			
1967	Gortkelly Hope	There's Hope – Eileen's First	30.05	T Quilkey		
1968	Roundtower Ville	Crazy Parachute – Roundtower Rose	29.45			
1969	Clonsherry	Clonalvy Pride – Small Sherry	29.80	J Morrissey		
1970	Paddock Judge	Lucky Wonder - Marillis	29.85	M Ryan		
1971	Bold Invader	Printers Prince – Yellow Streak	29.28	Mrs J Drohan		
1972	Westpark Ceylon	Myross Again – Westpark Fresia	29.80	J McCarthy		
1973	Caulstown Rose	Yellow Printer – Flash Around	29.50	J Murphy		
1974	Millie's Express	The Grand Silver – Gaultier Millie	29.90	John Meade		
1975	Peruvian Style	Kilbelin Style – Russian Boots	29.48	T Fahy		
1976	Stop It	Broadford Boy – Beaded Jill	29.38	M Drennan		
1977	Lindas Champion	Monalee Champion – Merry Linda	29.44	Michael Barrett		
1978	Laundry Basket	Moordyke Sandy – Peters Mistress	29.68	G Burke		
1979	Racing Prince	Gayline – Racing Far	29.54	R Chandler		
1980	Carrick Chance	Westmead Lane – Priceless Elm	29.50	Ger McKenna		
1981	Bally Echo	Limerick Echo – Ballykilty Gale	29.72	Matt O'Donnell		
1982	Shinrone Jet	Cairnville Jet – Move Sua	29.42	Ger McKenna		
1983	Sailing Weather	Minnesota Swank – Lindas Bower	29.20	W Boles		
1984	The Other Duke	Brilliant Chimes – Graceful Queen	29.28	Matt O'Donnell		
1985	Sybil Don	Bold Work – Sybil Isle	30.16	T Austin		
1986	Inchons Best	Brave Bran – Inchons Queen	30.68	Paul Hennessy		
1987	Lisadell Ranger	Express Opinion – Kilcloney Rose	30.66	P Harty		
1988	Yellow Bud	Yellow Ese - Budweiser	30.84	Matt O'Donnell		
1989	Manx Star	The Stranger – Ballarue Suzy	31.58	A Guildford		
1990	More Miles	Whisper Wishes – The Other Rose	30.86	Matt O'Donnell		
1991	Coalbrook Tiger	Skelligs Tiger – Summer Flower	30.44	Padraig Campion		
1992	Kilcloney Chief	Manorville Sand – Currane Rose	30.48	Aine O'Connell		
1993	Billy George	Galtymore Lad – Roses Chick	30.72	June Mullan		
1994	Viscount Hustle	Midnight Hustle – Keltic Bimbo	30.66	Philip Heffernan		
1995	Glenlara Ash	Mid Clare Champ – Glenmoira	30.62	Liam Kirley		
1996	Emly Express	Boyne Walk – Wise Up Jim	30.18	Chris Locke		
1997	Airmount Ranger	Airmount Spec – Airmount Mary	30.72	William Kiely		
1998	She Will Survive	Come On Ranger – Hazelbrook Haven	30.50	John McGee Sr.		
1999	Browside Darkie	Slaneyside Hare – Browside Pat	30.29	Francie Murray		
2000	Always Sorry	Boyne Walk – Ta Faite Romhat	29.11	Paul Hennessy	6/4f	
2001	Matts Picture	Some Picture – Mammys Nightmare	30.42	Eddie Wade	6/4f	
2002	Anchorage	Mustang Jack – Little League	30.25	Fraser Black	5/1	
2003	Killahara Dream	Smooth Rumble – Black Ice Girl	28.52	O'Donovan	3/1	
2004	Weatherman	Velvet Tom – Heywood Melody	28.64	Johnny Donohoe	1/2f	
2005	Broadacres Tommy	Joannestown Cash – Christmas Holly	28.59	Graham Holland	2/1	
2006	Gifted Sir	Pacific Mile – Katie King	28.69	Jim Langton	7/2	
2007	Comeonthecats	Brett Lee – Tyrur Dee	28.88	Paul Hennessy	7/1	
2008	Tisalladream	Honcho Classic – Proud Pegs Gift	28.71	Graham Holland	2/1f	
2009	Chicken Supper	Tucks Mein – Greenfield Gift	28.79	John Kiely	5/4f	
2010	Leeview Jet	Tucks Mein – Between the Two	28.77	Graham Holland	3/1	
2012	Boherna House	Head Bound – Hondo On Air	28.70	Rachel Wheeler	9/4	
2013	Kilgraney Tomson	Aries Son – Lady Kilgraney	28.64	Tom Buggy	5/1	
2014	Dannys Zebo	Hometown Boy – Windmill Chick	29.08	John O'Connell	4/1	
2015	Black Tom	Sparta Maestro – Whiteys Buddelia	28.40	Declan Byrne	5/2	
2016	Skiproe Master	Forest Master – Forest Tivoli	28.66	Pat Curtin	n/a	No SP declared
2017	Crohane Ronnie	Godsend – Moorstown Misha	28.68	Declan Byrne	5/2	
2018	Skywalker Rafa	Laughil Blake – Coolavanny Royce	28.81	Michael J O'Donovan	1/1f	
2019	Ghost Dancer	Scolari Me Daddy – Bewitching	28.81	Owen McKenna	1/1f	
2020	Riverside Leo	Knockglass Billy – Adamant Gem	28.65	Graham Holland	6/4f	
2021	Freedom Epic	Belles Direction – Jaytee Sahara	29.02	Kathleen Pomfret	n/a	NO SP due to COVID-19
2022	Bobsleigh Dream	Droopys Sydney – Bobsleigh Jet	28.75	Pat Buckley	1/1f	
2023	Pape Di Oro	Droopys Sydney – Trusted Exile	28.79	Pat Buckley	5/4f	
2024	Tribal Syd	Droopys Sydney – Myahs Friend	28.73	Murt Leahy	2/1	
2025	Jim By Two	Droopys Sydney – Livz Dream	28.91	Bredan Maunsell	3/1	
