= 2001 UK & Ireland Greyhound Racing Year =

Greyhound racing year

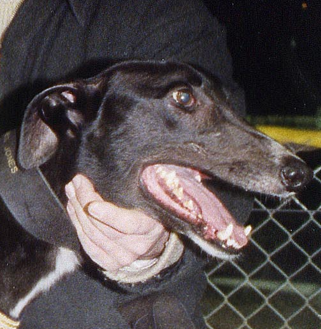
- Kinda Magic, winner of the Pall Mall Stakes

The 2001 UK & Ireland Greyhound Racing Year was the 76th year of greyhound racing in the United Kingdom and the 75th year of greyhound racing in Ireland.

== Roll of honour ==
Major Winners
Award	Name of Winner
2001 English Greyhound Derby	Rapid Ranger
2001 Irish Greyhound Derby	Cool Performance
2001 Scottish Greyhound Derby	Sonic Flight
Greyhound Trainer of the Year	Linda Jones
Greyhound of the Year	Rapid Ranger
Irish Dog and Bitch of the Year	Late Late Show / Marinas Tina

Trainers Championship, Hove (March 29)
Pos	Name of Trainer	Points
1st	Charlie Lister	54
2nd	Paul Young	41
3rd	Brian Clemenson	34
4th	John Mullins	32
5th	Linda Jones	27
6th	John McGee	20

== Summary ==
The National Greyhound Racing Club (NGRC) released the annual returns, with totalisator turnover at £91,969,298 and attendances recorded at 3,887,265 from 6180 meetings.

Rapid Ranger trained by Charlie Lister was voted Greyhound of the Year after winning his second English Greyhound Derby. The brindle dog joined an elite band of three greyhounds to win the Derby twice. Only Mick the Miller and Patricias Hope had previously achieved the feat.

Linda Jones won the Greyhound Trainer of the Year but it was fellow trainer John McGee Sr. that once again hit the headlines, with a controversy regarding the trainer's championship to be held at Hove. McGee qualified for the top six Trainers' Championship by virtue of finishing fifth in the 2000 standings but was upset at the fact that John Mullins was allowed to take the place of his mother Linda Mullins. John Mullins had taken control of the kennels following Linda's retirement but an angry John McGee stated "I read that it was an unanimous decision" referring to the announcement made by the Professional Greyhound Trainers' Association (PGTA), "but unanimous by who? "They should have asked the five other trainers who have qualified what they thought, not just changed the rules because they wanted John Mullins in." The anger was brought on by the fact that he had been denied an invitation to run in the 1988 championship after taking over the kennel from Fred Wiseman, who led the 1987 standings. "I was head man to Fred Wiseman, but everyone knew I was doing the dogs and we won everything that year". The Championship went ahead and was won by Charlie Lister but the controversy surrounding McGee continued, when later in the year he had a positive urine sample taken from Apple Rambler at Wimbledon. The NGRC once again withdrew his licence and he was told that no further application would be considered until January 2003.

== Tracks ==
Advanced plans by the Greyhound Racing Association to open a 2,000 seater stadium at Fazakerley in the north of Liverpool failed to materialise following opposition from residents. Liverpool had lost greyhound racing in 1973 despite having four prominent profitable tracks at one stage.

Castleford Whitwood Stadium held its final meeting in February; it had existed in spells as a licensed and independent track since 1938.

== News ==
Trainer Graham Holland left Oxford to join Hove and was replaced by Nick Colton. Carly Philpott took out her first licence following in the footsteps of her father Paul Philpott and Maxine Locke joined Catford. Leading owner Len Ponder moved all of his greyhounds from trainer Ray Peacock and transferred them to Seamus Cahill.

Owen McKenna son of Ger McKenna decided to return to Ireland to train mainly for David Miles (responsible for the Reactabond prefix) in Ballyclerihan. Despite having a contract at Wimbledon, McKenna had expressed concerns over lack of races and poor prize money.

== Competitions ==
The Nick Savva trained Sonic Flight won a strong Scottish Greyhound Derby, a competition that saw the shock disqualification in the first round of prolific open race winner El Boss, who was subsequently retired. Sonic Flight also won the Select Stakes and Irish Laurels.

The veteran Palace Issue now trained by John Mullins retired after failing to win the Golden Jacket but winning 69 of his 111 races and picking up £65,000 in prize money.

The Linda Jones-trained white and brindle, No Can Waltz, finished second in the Arc final, third in the Scottish Derby, and won the Test before losing to Slick Tom during a Grand Prix campaign at Walthamstow Stadium. He finished the year by reaching the St Leger final, competing in the same division as Solid Magic, who claimed the Olympic title and the first Cesarewitch held at Oxford.

== Ireland ==
2001 was a vintage year for stars, in the United Kingdom Rapid Ranger had dominated the news and Sonic Flight had a great year. In Ireland Cool Performance won the Derby but he was overshadowed by two of the finalists, Late Late Show and Droopys Kewell. Late Late Show owned by Pat Kenny and duly named after the popular show The Late Late Show became the nation's favourite greyhound. The black dog won the Easter Cup and Shelbourne 600, in addition to finishing runner-up in the Derby and being a finalist in the Champion Stakes. Droopys Kewell won three major events; the National Produce, St Leger and Champion Stakes. In any other year Droopys Kewell would have been Irish Greyhound of the Year but the accolade went to Late Late Show.

== Principal UK races ==
Grand National, Wimbledon (Mar 28, 460m h, £7,500)
Pos	Name of Greyhound	Trainer	SP	Time	Trap
1st	Kish Jaguar	Norah McEllistrim	10-1	28.60	6
2nd	Opus Air	Pat Thompson	6-1	28.72	5
3rd	Kanturk Canon	Jason Foster	12-1	28.90	1
4th	Apple Rambler	Linda Jones	7-4jf	29.00	2
5th	Rossa Ranger	John Counsell	7-4jf	29.22	3
6th	Kerbal Go Free	Philip Rees Jr.	50-1	29.40	4

Regal Scottish Derby, Shawfield (Apr 21, 480m, £20,000)
Pos	Name of Greyhound	Trainer	SP	Time	Trap
1st	Sonic Flight	Nick Savva	5-4	29.19	1
2nd	Droopys Vieri	Paul Young	11-10f	29.47	2
3rd	No Can Waltz	Linda Jones	6-1	29.53	6
4th	Droopys Honcho	Paul Young	20-1	29.57	5
5th	Harsu Super	Janis Carmichael	20-1	29.59	4
6th	Glengar Visit	Graeme Frew	50-1	30.11	3

Scurry Gold Cup, Catford (Jun 23, 385m, £3,000)
Pos	Name of Greyhound	Trainer	SP	Time	Trap
1st	Kalooki Jet	Sonja Spiers	7-4jf	23.90	6
2nd	Reactabond Slick	Paul Young	7-4jf	24.02	2
3rd	Aulton Topper	Cheryl Miller	5-1	24.16	3
4th	Breeze Encore	Arthur Hitch	12-1	24.28	4
5th	Bearas Heather	Wayne Wrighting	8-1	24.40	1
6th	Soul Pretender	Liz Redpath	7-1	24.46	5

Reading Masters, Reading (Jul 8, 465m, £20,000)
Pos	Name of Greyhound	Trainer	SP	Time	Trap
1st	Marshals June	Richard Stiles	11-4	27.99	3
2nd	Top Jock	Seamus Cahill	15-2	28.09	4
3rd	Pinewood Blue	Linda Jones	9-4jf	28.21	5
4th	El Joker	John McGee Sr.	20-1	28.27	6
5th	Carhumore Cross	Nick Savva	9-4jf	28.43	2
6th	El Jolson	John McGee Sr.	12-1	28.49	1

Gold Collar, Catford (Sep 15, 555m, £7,500)
Pos	Name of Greyhound	Trainer	SP	Time	Trap
1st	Haughty Ted	Dinky Luckhurst	2-1	35.26	6
2nd	Serious Dog	Paul Young	9-1	35.44	4
3rd	Sandyhill Dee	Paul Young	12-1	35.70	2
4th	Droopys Candice	Brian Clemenson	12-1	35.98	5
5th	Larkhill Blackie	Owen McKenna	8-1	36.02	3
6th	Senahel Ridge	Owen McKenna	1-1f	36.14	1

Countrywide Steel & Tubes TV Trophy, Wimbledon (Oct 2, 868m, £6,000)
Pos	Name of Greyhound	Trainer	SP	Time	Trap
1st	Killeacle Phoebe	Brian Clemenson	1-1f	54.27	1
2nd	Metric Tiger	John Haynes	2-1	54.45	5
3rd	Sexy Delight	Charlie Lister	3-1	54.83	3
4th	Xamax Xylograph	Norah McEllistrim	10-1	54.95	2
5th	Rosden Amy	Seamus Cahill	100-1	56.11	4
6th	Let Us Know	Elaine Parker	20-1	57.73	6

Grand Prix, Walthamstow (Oct 6, 640m, £10,000)
Pos	Name of Greyhound	Trainer	SP	Time	Trap
1st	Slick Tom	Owen McKenna	9-2	40.02	3
2nd	Kegans Flyer	Linda Jones	5-2	40.05	5
3rd	No Can Waltz	Linda Jones	5-6f	40.09	4
4th	Penalty Shootout	John Mullins	12-1	40.15	1
5th	Sandyhill Dee	Paul Young	33-1	40.35	2
6th	Ballyhoe Cyclone	Ernie Gaskin Sr.	25-1	40.37	6

Laurels, Belle Vue (Oct 23, 465m, £6,000)
Pos	Name of Greyhound	Trainer	SP	Time	Trap
1st	Pack Them In	Andy Heyes	6-4f	27.55	4
2nd	Magnum Tom	Charlie Lister	13-2	27.83	5
3rd	Codology	Barrie Draper	11-4	27.89	2
4th	Blues Best Mike	Nicki Chambers	9-1	27.97	6
5th	Vancouver Jet	Linda Jones	6-1	28.13	3
6th	Master Blackster	Elaine Parker	8-1	28.17	1

William Hill St Leger, Wimbledon (Nov 6, 660m, £12,000)
Pos	Name of Greyhound	Trainer	SP	Time	Trap
1st	Frisby Folly	Harry Crapper	3-1	40.74	2
2nd	Droopys Rhys	Ted Soppitt	8-1	40.96	1
3rd	Form of Magic	Brian Clemenson	7-2	41.00	3
4th	Lenson Cody	Brian Clemenson	20-1	41.20	4
5th	No Can Waltz	Linda Jones	7-4f	41.30	6
6th	Kegans Flyer	Linda Jones	7-1	41.42	5

RD Racing Cesarewitch, Oxford (Nov 24, 645m, £5,000)
Pos	Name of Greyhound	Trainer	SP	Time	Trap
1st	Solid Magic	Brian Clemenson	11-10f	39.72	6
2nd	Cuba	Brian Clemenson	5-4	39.86	1
3rd	Broadacres Butch	Graham Holland	10-1	40.06	5
4th	Breaking Ball	Ron Dix	40-1	40.10	3
5th	Lottys Magic	Brian Clemenson	8-1	40.22	4
6th	Valdex	Julie Curran	40-1	40.76	2

Oaks, Wimbledon (Dec 4, 480m, £6,000)
Pos	Name of Greyhound	Trainer	SP	Time	Trap
1st	Talktothehand	Jimmy Gibson	6-4jf	29.06	6
2nd	Aegean Dream	Charlie Lister	6-1	29.20	3
3rd	Olyadne	John Mullins	6-4jf	29.28	5
4th	Druids Glory	Claude Gardiner	6-1	29.30	2
5th	Clefairy Doll	John McGee Sr.	16-1	29.48	1
N/R	El Zita	John McGee Sr.			

== Principal Irish finals ==
Easter Cup Shelbourne (May 12, 525y, €31,743)
Pos	Name of Greyhound	SP	Time	Trap
1st	Late Late Show	9-10f	28.60	6
2nd	Marinas Tina	7-2	29.02	3
3rd	Kishlawn Gold	75-1	29.16	2
4th	Cregane Trade	6-1	29.17	5
5th	Sporting Huzzar	14-1	29.19	1
6th	Brother Jim	6-1	29.36	4

National Produce Thurles (May 27, 525y, €31,743)
Pos	Name of Greyhound	SP	Time	Trap
1st	Droopys Kewell	5-2	28.95	1
2nd	Paddock Magic	9-2	29.02	6
3rd	Zagato	25-1	29.54	5
4th	Long Valley Max	2-1f	29.96	2
5th	Toms Electrabuzz	7-2	30.24	4
6th	Hinton Admiral	7-2	30.45	3

Shelbourne 600 Shelbourne (Jun 19, 600y, €31,743)
Pos	Name of Greyhound	SP	Time	Trap
1st	Late Late Show	2-7f	32.20*TR	6
2nd	Cregane Trade	7-1	32.76	4
3rd	Amber Joe	12-1	33.00	1
4th	Articifer	16-1	33.11	3
5th	Making Merry	16-1	33.16	5
6th	Extra Dividend	12-1	33.86	2

St Leger Limerick (Jun 30, 550y, €31,743)
Pos	Name of Greyhound	SP	Time	Trap
1st	Droopys Kewell	5-2	30.37	4
2nd	Barefoot Ridge	5-1	30.47	2
3rd	Tyrur Bello	25-1	30.68	5
4th	Magna Mint	6-4f	30.86	3
5th	Kildrum Black	16-1	30.93	6
6th	Ormond Park	3-1	31.03	1

Oaks Shelbourne (Jul 21 525y, €31,743)
Pos	Name of Greyhound	SP	Time	Trap
1st	Marinas Tina	4-7f	28.60	1
2nd	Coolfadda Lady	7-1	28.95	5
3rd	Fast Lizzy	14-1	29.16	6
4th	Market Elm	20-1	29.33	2
5th	You Said So	7-1	29.40	3
6th	Twenty To Ten	10-1	29.46	4

Champion Stakes Shelbourne (Aug 30, 550y, €25,394)
Pos	Name of Greyhound	SP	Time	Trap
1st	Droopys Kewell	7-4jf	30.07	6
2nd	Tinys Bud	10-1	30.08	5
3rd	Long Valley Max	20-1	30.10	3
4th	Late Late Show	7-4jf	30.12	4
5th	Droopys Vieri	3-1	30.19	1
6th	Wish Kid	40-1	30.43	2

Puppy Derby Harolds Cross (Sep 28, 525y, €31,743)
Pos	Name of Greyhound	SP	Time	Trap
1st	Rutland Budgie	5-2	28.34	2
2nd	Judicial Rebel	5-2	28.65	5
3rd	Airport Express	7-4f	28.71	3
4th	Priceless Rebel	10-1	28.74	1
5th	The Other Master	8-1	29.09	6
6th	Aranock Lance	33-1	29.30	4

Laurels Cork (Oct 20, 525y, €31,743)
Pos	Name of Greyhound	SP	Time	Trap
1st	Sonic Flight	4-1	28.41	2
2nd	Micks Mystic	4-1	28.44	3
3rd	Larkhill Lo	5-1	28.48	5
4th	Premier County	4-1	28.62	6
5th	Barefoort Joe	20-1	28.65	4
6th	Long Valley Max	2-1f	28.83	1

== Totalisator returns ==
Extended content

The totalisator returns declared to the National Greyhound Racing Club for the year 2001 are listed below.

Stadium	Turnover £
Walthamstow	13,759,061
Wimbledon	9,388,927
Romford	7,902,983
Belle Vue	6,195,752
Brighton & Hove	5,306,629
Hall Green	5,230,576
Peterborough	4,191,293
Sheffield	3,796,116
Catford	3,756,371
Perry Barr	2,737,707
Oxford	2,596,375

Stadium	Turnover £
Sunderland	2,476,715
Crayford	2,468,397
Milton Keynes	2,025,326
Nottingham	1,989,139
Yarmouth	1,951,991
Shawfield	1,808,404
Poole	1,785,626
Monmore	1,709,821
Portsmouth	1,653,280
Swindon	1,573,085
Brough Park	1,528,081

Stadium	Turnover £
Sittingbourne	1,398,496
Reading	1,131,332
Harlow	891,481
Kinsley	756,527
Stainforth	730,441
Hull	464,525
Mildenhall	306,889
Henlow	259,952
Rye House	198,000
