= 1999 UK & Ireland Greyhound Racing Year =

The 1999 UK & Ireland Greyhound Racing Year was the 74th year of greyhound racing in the United Kingdom and the 73rd year of greyhound racing in Ireland.

== Roll of honour ==
Major Winners
Award	Name of Winner
1999 English Greyhound Derby	Chart King
1999 Irish Greyhound Derby	Spring Time
1999 Scottish Greyhound Derby	Chart King
Greyhound Trainer of the Year	Linda Mullins
Greyhound of the Year	Chart King
Irish Dog and Bitch of the Year	Chart King / Spring Time
Trainers Championship	Linda Jones

== Summary ==
The National Greyhound Racing Club (NGRC) released the annual returns, with totalisator turnover at £80,268,946 and attendances recorded at 3,511,847.

Chart King was voted Greyhound of the Year after winning the 1999 Scottish Greyhound Derby and 1999 English Greyhound Derby. He also picked up the Irish Greyhound of the Year award. Chart King a brindle dog was owned and trained by brothers Karl and Ralph Hewitt from Lurgan in Northern Ireland. He also won the Easter Cup in a record-breaking 28.40 at Shelbourne Park.

Linda Mullins won the Greyhound Trainer of the Year for the fourth successive year.

Sky Sports increased their TV coverage to show major events on Tuesday nights at Wimbledon including the Springbok and the Grand National, the latter now held at Wimbledon instead of Hall Green. They also wanted to show the Pall Mall Stakes at Oxford but the track was reluctant to switch the event to a Tuesday night so remained off the viewing schedule for the time being.

== Tracks ==
Wisbech reopened under NGRC rules and appointed former Peterborough RM Mike Middle. The tracks owner Gary Meads had improved the facilities after the venue had been closed for seven years. Canterbury closed its doors on 30 October and independent Workington ceased racing. Peterborough was severely damaged by fire spread from an adjoining warehouse. Work started immediately on repairs and refurbishment but there was no racing for six months.

The Dundalk Race Company PLC and Dundealgan Greyhound Racing Company Limited merged to form Dundalk Racing (1999) Ltd. The Dundalk Ramparts Greyhound Stadium was earmarked for a major rebuild.

== News ==
Elsewhere the BS Group (owners of several tracks) purchased the Milton Keynes Bowl to add to their assets. Shelley Cobbold sent out the last runner from the Utopia kennels at Nottingham, the family association with greyhound racing (Joe Cobbold, the late Trevor Cobbold and Pam Cobbold) ended. In November Linda Jones gained a contract at the country's premier track Walthamstow.

== Competitions ==
El Tenor dropped back down in distance in an attempt to defend his Grand National title and made the final but was unlucky to find trouble when going well. The race ended in a dead heat for Hello Buttons and Pottos Storm. Despite this defeat the target of 100 open race wins was in sight even though he had gone past five years of age. By the end of the year he was still competing and winning.

A puppy by the name of Rapid Ranger had started his career with defeat in two graded races at Stainforth for trainer Mike Pomfrett, but was improving and scored a first open win at Nottingham. By autumn he would improve and owner Ray White purchased the brindle and sent him to Charlie Lister.

A brindle dog called Palace Issue, trained by Linda Mullins started to perform superbly and quickly established himself as the leading stayer. He broke the track record at Romford during the Champion Stakes before winning the Group One Grand Prix at Walthamstow that included his rival Dilemmas Lad. A strong fancy for the first St Leger at Wimbledon, he had to settle for second behind Dilemmas Lad before successfully defending his Hunt Cup title at Reading.

Gerald Watson travelled to England with his 1999 Irish Greyhound Derby champion Spring Time and outclassed her rivals when winning the Oaks at Wimbledon and Bubbly Prince won the Cesarewitch at Catford Stadium for the Bubbly Club making up for the previous year's disappointment.

== Principal UK races ==
Grand National, Wimbledon (Mar 30, 460m h, £7,500)
Pos	Name of Greyhound	Trainer	SP	Time	Trap
1st	Hello Buttons (dh)	Linda Mullins	9-4cf	28.13	1
1st	Pottos Storm (dh)	David Mullins	9-4cf	28.13	4
3rd	Kennyswell Smoke	Tom Foster	8-1	28.31	6
4th	Rum and Black	Linda Mullins	14-1	28.39	5
5th	Autumn Duster	Tom Foster	33-1	28.55	2
6th	El Tenor	Linda Mullins	9-4cf	28.59	3

dh=dead heat

Regal Scottish Derby, Shawfield (May 1, 480m, £20,000)
Pos	Name of Greyhound	Trainer	SP	Time	Trap
1st	Chart King	Ralph Hewitt	4-5f	28.98	6
2nd	Wath Serenade	Andy Heyes	16-1	29.28	1
3rd	Droopys Zidane	Paul Young	8-1	29.40	2
4th	Droopys Merson	Nick Savva	6-4	29.56	5
5th	Laughta Man	Bill Mills	16-1	29.76	3
6th	Slaneys Bomber	John McGee Sr.	33-1	29.82	4

Reading Masters, Reading (May 16, 465m, £20,000)
Pos	Name of Greyhound	Trainer	SP	Time	Trap
1st	Torbal Piper	Tony Meek	14-1	28.15	6
2nd	Charlie the Layer	Chris Lund	2-1jf	28.21	4
3rd	Smiffys Errand	Nikki Chambers	14-1	28.35	5
4th	Clonbrin Best	John McGee Sr.	2-1jf	28.38	1
5th	Dower Leader	Ernie Gaskin Sr.	5-1	28.54	3
6th	Lung of Iron	Sally Fenwick	4-1	28.76	2

Scurry Gold Cup, Catford (Jul 6, 385m, £2,500)
Pos	Name of Greyhound	Trainer	SP	Time	Trap
1st	Lissenaire Luke	Charlie Lister	3-1jf	23.49	4
2nd	Union Decree	Ernie Gaskin Sr.	9-2	23.87	5
3rd	Kilbarry Boy	Mick Puzey	8-1	23.89	1
4th	Farncombe Pat	David Mullins	7-1	23.91	6
5th	Lauragh Exile	Terry Dartnall	3-1jf	24.29	3
6th	Bewdley Breeze	Ernie Gaskin Sr.	9-2	24.31	2

BT Gold Collar, Catford (Sep 18, 555m, £7,500)
Pos	Name of Greyhound	Trainer	SP	Time	Trap
1st	Rio Scorpio	Daniel Riordan	12-1	34.83	6
2nd	Dukes Again	Mick Puzey	7-2	34.91	1
3rd	Best Black	Linda Jones	2-1	34.95	5
4th	Dower Leader	Ernie Gaskin Sr.	6-4f	34.99	3
5th	Nice One Kim	Mick Douglass	8-1	35.01	4
6th	Little Me	Norah McEllistrim	33-1	35.35	2

Evening Standard TV Trophy, Wimbledon (Sep 21, 868m, £6,000)
Pos	Name of Greyhound	Trainer	SP	Time	Trap
1st	Hollinwood Poppy	Mick Clarke	10-1	54.89	4
2nd	Spenwood Wizard	Ron Hough	4-1	54.96	1
3rd	Spenwood Gem	Ron Hough	4-1	54.97	2
4th	Knappogue Oak	Ken Bebbington	8-11f	55.07	5
5th	Bubbly Prince	Patsy Cusack	14-1	55.45	6
6th	Careys Champion	Tom Foster	50-1	56.01	3

Grand Prix, Walthamstow (Oct 9, 640m, £7,500)
Pos	Name of Greyhound	Trainer	SP	Time	Trap
1st	Palace Issue	Linda Mullins	9-4f	40.32	6
2nd	Tessas Dilemma	Nick Savva	10-1	40.34	4
3rd	Dilemmas Lad	Nick Savva	4-1	40.46	5
4th	Drumsna Cross	Charlie Lister	5-1	40.58	2
5th	Bossy Wade	Linda Mullins	16-1	40.94	3
6th	Dream Compadre	Linda Mullins	5-2	41.04	1

Laurels, Belle Vue (Oct 26, 460m, £6,000)
Pos	Name of Greyhound	Trainer	SP	Time	Trap
1st	Derbay Flyer	Charlie Lister	10-11f	27.80	2
2nd	Brickfield Bonus	Patsy Byrne	3-1	27.82	5
3rd	Terrydrum Flyer	Jimmy Gibson	11-2	27.90	6
4th	Shabbas Mate	Adrian Kimpton	12-1	28.40	1
5th	Wath Serenade	Andy Heyes	8-1	28.44	4
6th	Water Ranger	June McCombe	33-1	28.60	3

St Leger, Wimbledon (Nov 9, 660m, £12,000)
Pos	Name of Greyhound	Trainer	SP	Time	Trap
1st	Dilemmas Lad	Nick Savva	5-1	40.56	1
2nd	Palace Issue	Linda Mullins	11-10f	40.74	3
3rd	Knappogue Oak	Ken Bebbington	2-1	40.76	6
4th	Kennel Image	Hazel Dickson	25-1	40.96	2
5th	Sew Trader	Arthur Hitch	6-1	41.16	5
6th	Allegro Royale	Ernie Gaskin Sr.	20-1	41.26	4

William Hill Oaks, Wimbledon (Nov 26, 480m, £6,000)
Pos	Name of Greyhound	Trainer	SP	Time	Trap
1st	Spring Time	Gerald Watson	4-9f	28.97	6
2nd	Tarmon Tia	Jackie Taylor	14-1	29.13	3
3rd	Dower Beauty	Peter Rich	5-1	29.35	1
4th	Im Okay	Barrie Draper	7-1	29.37	5
5th	Farloe Twin	Terry Dartnall	8-1	29.41	4
6th	Honky Tonk Gal	Linda Jones	16-1	29.42	2

Cesarewitch, Catford (Dec 4, 718m, £5,000)
Pos	Name of Greyhound	Trainer	SP	Time	Trap
1st	Bubbly Prince	Patsy Cusack	4-6f	45.90	5
2nd	Phils Ann Marie	Danny Smee	7-1	46.36	1
3rd	Springville Sion	Tom Lanceman	4-1	46.38	3
4th	Deise Prince	Roy Towner	7-1	46.64	2
5th	Hopping Mick	Dennis Bakewell	100-1	46.78	6
6th	Freighduff Ball	Ray Peacock	10-1	46.92	4

=== Principal Irish finals ===
Easter Cup Shelbourne (525y)
Pos	Name of Greyhound	SP	Time	Trap
1st	Chart King	5-4f	28.40 TR	2
2nd	Frisby Flashing	14-1	28.70	4
3rd	Crossleigh Fudge	10-1	29.00	6
4th	April Surprise	11-4	29.06	1
5th	Pescasdor	14-1	29.36	3
6th	Garvagh Tommy	5-1	29.50	5

National Produce Thurles (525y)
Pos	Name of Greyhound	SP	Time	Trap
1st	Borna Survivor	9-2	29.15	2
2nd	Airmount Rover	1-1f	29.25	6
3rd	Ballingarry Joy	7-4	29.35	1
4th	Lake Eagle Lad		29.51	5
5th	Badge of Tigings		29.55	4
6th	First Watch		00.00	3

Shelbourne 600 Shelbourne (600y)
Pos	Name of Greyhound	SP	Time	Trap
1st	Frisby Flashing	12-1	32.83	2
2nd	Boozing Buddy	4-1	33.05	5
3rd	Millstream Lad	12-1	33.07	3
4th	Kilmessan Jet	1-2f	33.09	6
5th	Duffys Kestrel	16-1	33.11	1
6th	Martinstown Gold	16-1	33.21	4

St Leger Limerick (550y)
Pos	Name of Greyhound	SP	Time	Trap
1st	Frisby Flashing	1-1f	29.64 TR	4
2nd	Soviet Merc	5-1	29.78	6
3rd	Race First	7-2	30.20	2
4th	Cable King	10-1	30.41	5
5th	Aussie Prince	10-1	30.44	3
6th	Bawnogue Pal		30.65	1

Oaks Shelbourne (525y)
Pos	Name of Greyhound	SP	Time	Trap
1st	Borna Survivor	4-5f	28.67	
2nd	Metric Flower		28.86	
3rd	Craggy Island		29.16	
u	Peter Spice			
u	Mantle Glory			
u	Deenside Delight			

Champion Stakes Shelbourne (550y)
Pos	Name of Greyhound	SP	Time	Trap
1st	Mr Bozz	9-1	30.42	
2nd	Santa Paolo		30.45	
3rd				
4th				
5th				
6th				

Puppy Derby Harolds Cross (525y)
Pos	Name of Greyhound	SP	Time	Trap
1st	Cool Performance	2-1f	28.50	3
2nd	Always Sorry	5-1	29.06	6
3rd	Cill Dubh Amber	16-1	29.13	4
4th	Aughduff Tim	11-4	29.34	5
5th	Woodbroke Wine	3-1	29.41	2
6th	Wellpad Hero		29.69	1

Laurels Cork (525y)
Pos	Name of Greyhound	SP	Time	Trap
1st	Lumber Boss (dead heat)	5-1	29.42	6
1st	Tigers Eye (dead-heat)	10-1	29.42	1
3rd	Sandyhill Slip			3
4th	Sineads Rocket			2
5th	Rathroon Ranger			4
N/R	Mr Pickwick			5

== Totalisator returns ==
Extended content

The totalisator returns declared to the National Greyhound Racing Club for the year 1999 are listed below.

Stadium	Turnover £
London (Walthamstow)	12,656,388
London (Wimbledon)	9,173,828
Romford	7,282,198
Manchester (Belle Vue)	5,111,368
Brighton & Hove	4,939,600
Birmingham (Hall Green)	4,652,283
London (Catford)	3,585,163
Sheffield (Owlerton)	2,801,479
Birmingham (Perry Barr)	2,412,500
Sunderland	2,332,195
Crayford	2,300,663

Stadium	Turnover £
Oxford	1,758,882
Peterborough	1,676,251
Wolverhampton (Monmore)	1,594,903
Glasgow (Shawfield)	1,590,526
Poole	1,511,642
Nottingham	1,460,253
Yarmouth	1,434,126
Newcastle (Brough Park)	1,412,960
Milton Keynes	1,411,222
Portsmouth	1,348,322
Reading	1,097,280

Stadium	Turnover £
Swindon	967,235
Harlow	811,109
Sittingbourne	795,277
Doncaster (Stainforth)	370,248
Hull (New Craven Park)	310,024
Mildenhall	213,199
Swaffham	184,693
Henlow (Bedfordshire)	176,723
Rye House	168,215
