= 2000 UK & Ireland Greyhound Racing Year =

The 2000 UK & Ireland Greyhound Racing Year was the 75th year of greyhound racing in the United Kingdom and the 74th year of greyhound racing in Ireland.

== Roll of honour ==
Major Winners
Award	Name of Winner
2000 English Greyhound Derby	Rapid Ranger
2000 Irish Greyhound Derby	Judicial Pride
2000 Scottish Greyhound Derby	Knockeevan Star
Greyhound Trainer of the Year	Linda Mullins
Greyhound of the Year	Palace Issue
Irish Dog and Bitch of the Year	Judicial Pride / Marinas Tina
Trainers Championship	Nick Savva

== Summary ==
The National Greyhound Racing Club (NGRC) released the annual returns, with totalisator turnover at £86,014,070 and attendances recorded at 3,697,939 from 6643 meetings.

Palace Issue trained by Linda Mullins was voted Greyhound of the Year after winning the St Leger at Wimbledon Stadium, defending his Grand Prix title at Walthamstow, winning a third successive Hunt Cup and second WJ & JE Cearns Invitation. Mullins also won the Greyhound Trainer of the Year for the fifth successive year and then announced her retirement, the kennels and licence was switched to one of her sons John.

El Tenor owned by Mario Lanfranchi and trained by Mullins brought up the magical 100 open race wins to write his name in the history books as one of the greatest hurdlers. Rising star Rapid Ranger was third in the Scottish Greyhound Derby behind Knockeevan Star and then went on to win the 2000 English Greyhound Derby.

== Tracks ==
Irish tracks were subject to changes. The Dundalk Ramparts Greyhound Stadium closed on 20 November in order for the major rebuild to take place. Curraheen Park opened on 8 April as a replacement for the previous track the Cork (Western Road) Greyhound Stadium, the sale of the old track enabled the Irish Greyhound Board to fund a new stadium with modern facilities. The Kingdom Greyhound Stadium in Tralee also underwent a major refit as the stadium was redesigned for the new Millennium.

Swaffham ceased to race after the promoter Tom Smith and the holder of the lease Vince Moody had a disagreement, the track had raced for 13 years and was turned into a schooling facility. Tom Smith and son Gavin Smith would leave a lasting legacy however as they were responsible for producing the 'Swaffham hare'. During a ten-year period they had produced a hare system that would replace just about every other hare system; the McGee, outside Sumner, inside Sumner and Bramich would all but disappear.

== News ==
The Supertrack competition inaugurated in 1994 is officially ended by the British Greyhound Racing Board. Harlow lost three trainers in quick succession; Jean Carter moved to Crayford, Wayne Wilson to Catford and Kay Wyatt to Sittingbourne. Wyatt would soon give up training and Maxine Locke would take over the kennels and contract at Sittingbourne. Hazel Dickson retired leaving Wimbledon for other interests outside of greyhound racing; she had never recovered from the day that Wembley closed.

Nick Savva won the trainers championship and trained 93 British Bred winners in one year, only Trevor Cobbold in 1994 had produced a more. Catford Racing Manager Phil Donaldson left for a career in journalism with the Racing Post with his assistant Derek Hope taking over. Crayford also lost their Racing Manager after Paul Lawrence left to be replaced by deputy Harry Bull with Danny Rayment promoted to deputy.

== Competitions ==
Catford hosted their last Cesarewitch before it switched to Oxford.

== Principal UK races ==
Grand National, Wimbledon (Mar 28, 460m h, £7,500)
Pos	Name of Greyhound	Trainer	SP	Time	Trap
1st	Tuttles Minister	Tom Foster	3-1	28.36	5
2nd	Catunda Leonardo	Terry Dartnall	13-8f	28.37	6
3rd	Apple Rambler	Tom Foster	6-1	28.39	3
4th	Lenson Eddie	Ray Peacock	9-2	28.55	2
5th	Silbury Willow	Tom Foster	7-1	28.81	1
6th	Kennyswell Smoke	Tom Foster	3-1	29.23	4

Regal Scottish Derby, Shawfield (Apr 15, 480m, £20,000)
Pos	Name of Greyhound	Trainer	SP	Time	Trap
1st	Knockeevan Star	Tom Flaherty	3-1	29.19	1
2nd	Ryefield Snowy	Paul Stringer	20-1	29.35	4
3rd	Rapid Ranger	Charlie Lister	3-1	29.37	3
4th	Knockanroe Rover	Paul Stringer	2-1f	29.39	2
5th	Fat Boy Slim	Jim Reynolds	7-2	29.55	5
6th	Spring Time	Gerald Watson	4-1	29.91	6

Scurry Gold Cup, Catford (Jun 24, 385m, £3,000)
Pos	Name of Greyhound	Trainer	SP	Time	Trap
1st	El Boss	Linda Mullins	5-4f	23.65	2
2nd	Regal Eagle	Tony Taylor	10-1	23.97	1
3rd	Lenson Sunny	Ray Peacock	8-1	23.99	6
4th	Ceephil	Linda Mullins	10-1	24.19	5
5th	Rachels Miller	Dave Hopper	9-4	24.21	3
6th	Glowing Wave	Barry Wileman	8-1	24.53	4

Reading Masters, Reading (Jul 9, 465m, £20,000)
Pos	Name of Greyhound	Trainer	SP	Time	Trap
1st	Jicky	Brian Clemenson	11-2	28.16	6
2nd	Glenholm Duke	Nikki Chambers	7-2	28.38	3
3rd	Fervent Flash	Jo Burridge	66-1	28.42	5
4th	Hedsor Sheila	Keith Howard	33-1	28.62	2
5th	Smoking Wardy	Derek Knight	10-11f	28.70	4
6th	Carnalecka Chief	John McGee Sr.	4-1	28.80	1

BT Gold Collar, Catford (Sep 16, 555m, £7,500)
Pos	Name of Greyhound	Trainer	SP	Time	Trap
1st	Castlelyons Dani	Arthur Hitch	5-4f	35.04	6
2nd	Gold Bullet	David Mullins	7-2	35.08	1
3rd	Romany Lad	Daphne Mann	6-1	35.16	3
4th	Astoria Noir	Terry Dartnall	15-2	35.34	5
5th	Allez Vieira	John McGee Sr.	5-1	35.44	2
6th	Fawn Nikita	Paul Young	25-1	35.48	4

Evening Standard TV Trophy, Wimbledon (Oct 3, 868m, £6,000)
Pos	Name of Greyhound	Trainer	SP	Time	Trap
1st	Sexy Delight	Charlie Lister	9-4f	54.51	1
2nd	Spenwood Wizard	Jo Burridge	3-1	54.53	6
3rd	Hollinwood Poppy	Mick Clarke	3-1	54.83	5
4th	Drumsna Cross	Charlie Lister	33-1	54.95	2
5th	El Poker	Linda Mullins	8-1	55.07	3
6th	Spenwood Gem	Ron Hough	4-1	55.11	4

Laurels, Belle Vue (Oct 10, 465m, £6,000)
Pos	Name of Greyhound	Trainer	SP	Time	Trap
1st	Courts Legal	Linda Jones	7-4	27.86	1
2nd	Wrenbury Rin Tin	Mick Cliffe	33-1	28.20	2
3rd	Smoking Bullet	Derek Knight	4-5f	28.24	5
4th	Brickfield Bonus	Patsy Byrne	12-1	28.48	6
5th	Wrenbury Rebel	Mick Cliffe	20-1	28.58	3
6th	Gambling Man	Anthony McConnell	12-1	28.59	4

Grand Prix, Walthamstow (Oct 14, 640m, £10,000)
Pos	Name of Greyhound	Trainer	SP	Time	Trap
1st	Palace Issue	Linda Mullins	1-3f	39.32	3
2nd	So Breezy	Linda Mullins	7-1	39.48	4
3rd	Countrywide Star	John McGee Sr.	8-1	40.10	2
4th	Lady Jean	Ken Tester	14-1	40.14	1
5th	Little Diane	Gary Baggs	25-1	40.24	5
6th	Black Return	Mick Puzey	20-1	40.26	6

St Leger, Wimbledon (Nov 7, 660m, £12,000)
Pos	Name of Greyhound	Trainer	SP	Time	Trap
1st	Palace Issue	Linda Mullins	1-2f	40.74	3
2nd	Sonas Phantom	Linda Jones	14-1	40.96	2
3rd	Early Flight	Nick Savva	3-1	41.02	6
4th	So Breezy	Linda Mullins	16-1	41.10	4
5th	Castlelyons Dani	Arthur Hitch	16-1	41.11	5
6th	Lenson Ladson	Ray Peacock	50-1	41.43	1

Oaks, Wimbledon (Dec 6, 480m, £6,000)
Pos	Name of Greyhound	Trainer	SP	Time	Trap
1st	Ragga Juju	Joanne Page	7-1	29.29	2
2nd	Countrywide Tams	John McGee Sr.	5-1	29.31	1
3rd	Kinda Swell	Linda Jones	10-1	29.32	4
4th	After The Tide	Linda Jones	5-4f	29.34	6
5th	Early Flight	Nick Savva	20-1	29.40	5
6th	Ryefield Snowy	Brian Clemenson	3-1	29.41	3

Cesarewitch, Catford 94, 718m, £5,000)
Pos	Name of Greyhound	Trainer	SP	Time	Trap
1st	Lady Jean	Ken Tester	11-8f	45.63	4
2nd	El Poker	Linda Mullins	5-2	46.03	2
3rd	Elderberry Vixen	Pat Ryan	9-4	46.19	6
4th	Lenson Ladson	Ray Peacock	8-1	46.57	1
5th	Larkhill Mist	Owen McKenna	66-1	46.77	5
6th	Castlelyons Fuji	Barry Wileman	25-1	46.87	3

=== Principal Irish finals ===
Easter Cup Shelbourne (Apr 1, 525y)
Pos	Name of Greyhound	SP	Time	Trap
1st	Mr Bozz	7-4f	28.94	
2nd	Kishlawn Gold		28.98	
3rd	Tearaway Prince		29.17	
4th	Vintage Knows		29.19	
5th	Scaldy Sarah		29.24	
6th	Sandyhill Slip		29.25	

National Produce Thurles (Apr 30, 525y)
Pos	Name of Greyhound	SP	Time	Trap
1st	Moyne Rebel	1-2f	28.70 TR	5
2nd	Official Leader		29.19	1
3rd	Kishlawn Gold		29.29	3
4th	Glossy Buttons		29.30	2
5th	Barefoot Ridge		29.36	4
6th	Gold Chief		29.68	6

Shelbourne 600 Shelbourne (May 6, 600y)
Pos	Name of Greyhound	SP	Time	Trap
1st	Joannestown Cash	6-4f	32.49 TR	3
2nd	Winetavern Sam	8-1	32.77	2
3rd	Betting Ring	12-1	32.84	1
4th	Kilmessan Jet	5-2	32.94	4
5th	Glenwood Sassy	7-1	33.12	5
6th	Tearaway Prince	10-1	33.43	6

St Leger Limerick (Jul 1, 550y)
Pos	Name of Greyhound	SP	Time	Trap
1st	Extra Dividend	8-1	29.79	4
2nd	Shanless Park	5-4f	30.07	1
3rd	Upward Star	6-1	30.17	5
4th	Deerfield Tycoon	3-1	30.45	3
5th	Glossy Buttons	6-1	30.46	2
6th	Crossleigh Fudge	10-1	30.64	6

Oaks Shelbourne (Jul 8, 525y)
Pos	Name of Greyhound	SP	Time	Trap
1st	Marinas Tina	9-4f	28.56	2
2nd	Stay Sharp	5-1	28.86	1
3rd	Miss Tetley	8-1	28.89	3
4th	Unsinkable Girl	7-2	29.08	6
5th	Scaldy Sarah	3-1	29.17	5
6th	Miss Allurity	7-1	29.29	4

Foras na Gaeilge Champion Stakes Shelbourne (Jul 22, 550y)
Pos	Name of Greyhound	SP	Time	Trap
1st	Lemon Ralph	8-1	30.08	
2nd	Mr Bozz		30.26	
3rd	Droopys Vieri		30.36	
4th	Spring Time		30.38	
5th	Judicial Pride		30.60	
6th	Currie Kid		31.06	

Gain/Daniel J Reilly Puppy Derby Harolds Cross (Sep 29, 525y)
Pos	Name of Greyhound	SP	Time	Trap
1st	Droopys Vieri	4-6f	28.36	3
2nd	Watch The Market	9-1	28.71	6
3rd	Darter	12-1	28.78	5
4th	Home Power	9-1	29.13	4
5th	Byerley Bet	12-1	29.20	2
6th	Curryhills Wade	7-1	29.69	1

Laurels Cork (Oct 28, 525y)
Pos	Name of Greyhound	SP	Time	Trap
1st	Barefoot Ridge	6-1	28.69	3
2nd	Moyne Rebel	4-5f	28.72	6
3rd	Extra Dividend	16-1	28.86	2
4th	O Rahilly Walk	10-1	29.00	1
5th	Lemon Ralph	12-1	29.11	4
6th	Marinas Tina	13-4	29.46	5

== Totalisator returns ==
Extended content

The totalisator returns declared to the National Greyhound Racing Club for the year 2000 are listed below. Although the tracks are listed in the order of largest to smallest turnover the actual figures were not released (with the exception of Wimbledon).

Stadium	Turnover £
Walthamstow	
Wimbledon	9,068,036
Romford	
Belle Vue	
Brighton & Hove	
Hall Green	
Peterborough	
Catford	
Sheffield	
Perry Barr	
Crayford	

Stadium	Turnover £
Sunderland	
Oxford	
Milton Keynes	
Nottingham	
Shawfield	
Monmore	
Yarmouth	
Poole	
Portsmouth	
Brough Park	
Swindon	

Stadium	Turnover £
Sittingbourne	
Reading	
Harlow	
Stainforth	
Kinsley	
Wisbech	
Mildenhall	
Henlow	
Rye House	
Hull	
