= 2000 Irish Greyhound Derby =

2000 Paddy Power Irish Greyhound Derby
- Venue: Shelbourne Park
- Location: Dublin
- Start date: 3 August
- End date: 2 September
- Total prize money: £60,000 (winner)

The 2000 Irish Greyhound Derby took place during August and September with the final being held at Shelbourne Park in Dublin on 2 September 2000.

The winner Judicial Pride won £60,000 and was trained by Michael O'Donovan, owned by Pat Daly and bred by Michael Walsh. The race was sponsored for the first time by Paddy Power.

== Final result ==
At Shelbourne, 2 September (over 550 yards):

Position	Winner	Breeding	Trap	SP	Time	Trainer
1st	Judicial Pride	Thorgil Tex - Dons Pride	2	6-4f	29.68	Michael O'Donovan
2nd	Rapid Ranger	Come on Ranger - Rapid Vienna	5	7-4	29.89	Charlie Lister (England)
3rd	Miss Tetley	Staplers Jo - Much Better	6	12-1	29.94	Fraser Black
4th	Ballyhoe Cyclone	Lassa Java - Picture Palace	3	33-1	30.22	Mal Thomas
5th	Golfing Lad	Polnoon Chief - Roses Jewel	4	33-1	30.36	Fraser Black
6th	Currie Kid	Spiral Nikita - Westmead Spirit	1	6-1	30.54	Seamus Graham

=== Distances ===
2½, ¾, 3½, 1¾, 2¼ (lengths)

== Competition Report ==
The 2000 English Greyhound Derby champion Rapid Ranger only just managed to take his place in the first round after the ferry transporting him was late, as a consequence the ante-post favourite only just qualified for the next round after finishing third in his heat. The fastest winner of the first round was Joannestown Cash in 29.92.

In the second round Rapid Ranger bounced back to form recording 29.97, a time nearly matched by English Derby semi-finalist Judicial Pride in 29.98. Greenfield Deal now with Matt Travers recorded 30.13, as did Killiney Kingdom.

In the opening quarter-final Greenfield Deal was fast away from the traps and broke the track record time by finishing in 29.74 (15 spots (0.15 sec) inside Frisby Flashing's former record). Official Leader claimed the second heat before Currie Kid won heat three which contained Rapid Ranger and defending champion Spring Time, the latter failed to progress. Judicial Pride completed the quarter-final winners.

Rapid Ranger came good again in the semi-finals catching leader Currie Kid in 29.94, with Miss Tetley taking third place. In the second semi final Judicial Pride was away fast, easing to a seven and a quarter length win and another new track record time of 29.66. Golfing Lad and Ballyhone Cyclone were a distant second and third and Greenfield Deal not only lost his short lived record but failed to make the final.

Judicial Pride did everything right in the final, taking an early lead and then helped by the slow start of Currie Kid on his inside. The fawn dog then completed his unbeaten Derby campaign by crossing the line in a very fast 29.68, Rapid Ranger had a poor trap five draw and ran on well to take the runner-up spot.

== Quarter finals ==
Heat 1 (Aug 19)
Pos	Name	SP	Time
1st	Greenfield Deal	4-1	29.74
2nd	Ballyhoe Cyclone	10-1	29.98
3rd	Killiney Kingdom	5-1	30.58
4th	Concorde Direct	1-1f	00.00
5th	Fat Boy Slim	7-1	00.00
6th	Three Jacks	25-1	00.00

Heat 2 (Aug 19)
Pos	Name	SP	Time
1st	Official Leader	14-1	30.10
2nd	Golfing Lad	7-1	30.20
3rd	Johannestown Cash	7-4f	30.38
4th	Lemon Ralph	3-1	30.40
5th	Lenson Returns	5-2	30.45
6th	Quanns Bridge	8-1	31.22

Heat 3 (Aug 19)
Pos	Name	SP	Time
1st	Currie Kid	3-1	30.22
2nd	Wings of Speed	10-1	30.24
3rd	Rapid Ranger	11-10f	30.25
4th	Shanless Park	6-1	30.42
5th	Spring Time	10-1	30.70
6th	New One	33-1	30.77

Heat 4 (Aug 19)
Pos	Name	SP	Time
1st	Judicial Pride	7-2	30.06
2nd	Marinas Tina	6-4f	30.08
3rd	Miss Tetley	7-1	30.13
4th	Mr Bozz	7-2	30.15
5th	Billionaire	8-1	30.33
6th	Compsey Tribunal	33-1	30.54

== Semi finals ==
First Semi-final (Aug 26)
Pos	Name of Greyhound	SP	Time
1st	Rapid Ranger	2-1f	29.94
2nd	Currie Kid	3-1	30.08
3rd	Miss Tetley	8-1	30.13
4th	Johannestown Cash	4-1	30.20
5th	Official Leader	8-1	30.31
6th	Killiney Kingdom	16-1	30.31

Second Semi-final (Aug 26)
Pos	Name of Greyhound	SP	Time
1st	Judicial Pride	5-2jf	29.66
2nd	Golfing Lad	20-1	30.18
3rd	Ballyhoe Cyclone	20-1	30.29
4th	Marinas Tina	5-2jf	30.30
5th	Greenfield Deal	3-1	30.44
6th	Wings of Speed	8-1	30.51

== See also ==
- 2000 UK & Ireland Greyhound Racing Year
