= 1998 UK & Ireland Greyhound Racing Year =

The 1998 UK & Ireland Greyhound Racing Year was the 73rd year of greyhound racing in the United Kingdom and the 72nd year of greyhound racing in Ireland.

== Roll of honour ==
Major Winners
Award	Name of Winner
1998 English Greyhound Derby	Toms The Best
1998 Irish Greyhound Derby	Eyeman
1998 Scottish Greyhound Derby	Larkhill Jo
Greyhound Trainer of the Year	Linda Mullins
Greyhound of the Year	Toms The Best
Irish Dog and Bitch of the Year	Eyeman / April Surprise
Trainers Championship	Ernie Gaskin Sr.

== Summary ==
The National Greyhound Racing Club (NGRC) released the annual returns, with totalisator turnover at £78,981,066 and attendances recorded at 3,606,704.

Irish Greyhound Derby champion Toms The Best trained by Nick Savva was voted Greyhound of the Year after finishing runner-up in the Scottish Greyhound Derby at Shawfield Stadium and winning the 1998 English Greyhound Derby.

Linda Mullins won Greyhound Trainer of the Year for the third successive year.

The industry lost Wembley when it was announced that greyhound racing would no longer take place there. The last race was held on Friday 18 December. A twist of fate resulted in a no race on that final night after a hare failure, just like 71 years previous when on the opening night in 1927 the same happened.

== Tracks ==
Independent track Long Eaton in the hands of the receivers Grant Thompson suffered a catastrophic grandstand fire on Sunday 27 December. The receivers had hoped to sell it for £1.5 million to developers but the Erewash council had voted unanimously (44-0) that the track would remain a sporting venue. However that plan was scuppered after the fire which local police treated as suspicious. With no grandstand anyone interested in bringing back racing had pulled out of negotiations. Leading owner, Pat Chambers, had been involved in a scheme to buy the track in January.

== News ==
Wembley Racing Manager John Rowley left the sport whilst Peter Miller moved to Hove. Wembley trainers Ken Tester and Terry Atkins relocated to Catford before switching to Crayford and Oxford respectively, Patsy Cusack joined Crayford and Hazel Dickson joined Wimbledon, John Haynes kept a small kennel to open race, while Wally Ginzel and Pam Heasman would both soon retire.

The Sporting Life closed in May after a merger with the Racing Post; it was the end of an era for the newspaper that had served greyhound racing for decades and its editor Bob Betts. Subsequently the Racing Post sponsored a new festival of racing at Walthamstow.

Seven-time champion trainer John McGee Sr. returned to England after spending four years in Ireland. He leased the Halls Green Farm kennels in Roydon, Essex, where former Walthamstow stars were reared, after selling his Woodlands Kennels in County Kildare. His relationship with the NGRC remained fractious and they announced that they would not be licence him until he met the £30,000 legal bill accumulated from the failed high court ban back in 1994. After agreeing a payment he was given an attachment at Rye House. Meanwhile at Peterborough Racing Manager Mike Middle retired and was replaced by Con Baker.

Sheffield won the Supertrack (a competition between tracks); they beat the competition which included hosts Walthamstow by scoring 81 points; Walthamstow finished 2nd with 69 points with Henlow in third with 39.

== Competitions ==
The last Grand National at Hall Green was won by a greyhound called El Tenor trained by Linda Mullins and owned by Italian film producer Mario Lanfranchi. The brindle dog had won the Essex Vase in 1996 before being disqualified and being switched to hurdles and then won 9 from 13 before the Grand National. During the final El Tenor came from off the pace to catch and beat Quote That and Mullins saw a gap in the open race circuit over stayers hurdles. No other greyhound could compete with him over staying hurdles events and he won many open races throughout the year and passed Poor Sue's record of 69 open victories when picking up another victory at Nottingham in December.

In the Pall Mall Stakes at Oxford Stadium Droopys Eric took a length off Carmels Prince's eight year old track record beating Blue Murlen in the process. Later following a major car accident Droopys Eric was injured with a kennelmate dying and passenger Olive Tasker seriously injured. Eric was withdrawn from the semi-finals. On 17 March, Ernie Gaskin Sr. won his third trainer's championship when winning the event at Sittingbourne. The event was the closest in history because Gaskin and Brian Clemenson tied on points, meaning that on count back the number of winners would determine the champion. However they also had an equal number of winners, which resulted in the decision that second placings would count.

During the Golden Jacket final Bubbly Princess won but was then disqualified by the stewards, the connections were waiting at the podium when the announcement took place. Linda Jones and the Bubbly Club lost the £7,500 first prize but Mario Lanfranchi the owner of El Onda gave the trophy away after not being happy at winning by default.

== Principal UK races ==
Worthington Creamflow Bitter Grand National, Hall Green (Apr 7, 474m h, £7,500)
Pos	Name of Greyhound	Trainer	SP	Time	Trap
1st	El Tenor	Linda Mullins	11-10f	29.20	5
2nd	Quote That	David Mullins	8-1	29.22	2
3rd	Why Brian	Terry O'Sullivan	9-2	29.24	1
4th	Chums Choice	Robinson	12-1	29.36	6
5th	Kevs Express	Tom Foster	14-1	29.76	3
6th	Stradeen Ranger	Gary Baggs	4-1	29.94	4

Regal Scottish Derby, Shawfield (Apr 18, 480m, £20,000)
Pos	Name of Greyhound	Trainer	SP	Time	Trap
1st	Larkhill Jo	Nick Savva	5-4f	29.01	5
2nd	Toms The Best	Nick Savva	5-2	29.07	6
3rd	Droopys Deniro	Charlie Lister	20-1	29.15	4
4th	Jonssen	John McGee Sr.	5-1	29.29	3
5th	Treasury Tag	Francie Murray	6-1	29.43	1
6th	Mi Sateen	John McGee Sr.	6-1	29.58	2

Reading Masters, Reading (May 3, 465m, £20,000)
Pos	Name of Greyhound	Trainer	SP	Time	Trap
1st	You Will Call	Jo Burridge	5-1	27.90	3
2nd	Fawn Boy	Nikki Adams	6-1	27.93	5
3rd	Spoonbill Snowey	Michael Bacon	6-4f	28.07	6
4th	Enchanted Wood	Roy Towner	20-1	28.11	2
5th	Ceekay	Linda Mullins	7-2	28.19	4
6th	Frisco Sir	Ray Peacock	8-1	28.29	1

Worthington Creamflow Bitter Scurry Gold Cup, Catford (Jul 11, 385m, £2,500)
Pos	Name of Greyhound	Trainer	SP	Time	Trap
1st	Im Frankie	Mick Puzey	9-1	24.40	3
2nd	Leaders Highway	Geoff De Mulder	4-1	24.48	4
3rd	Union Decree	Ernie Gaskin Sr.	4-9f	24.50	1
4th	Lenson Gold	Norah McEllistrim	10-1	24.76	2
5th	Kilderry Mover	John Coxon	25-1	25.00	5
6th	Hello Buttons	Linda Mullins	8-1	25.02	6

Syntegra Gold Collar, Catford (Sep 19, 555m, £7,500)
Pos	Name of Greyhound	Trainer	SP	Time	Trap
1st	Pure Patches	Dinky Luckhurst	11-10f	34.68	5
2nd	El Hombre	Linda Mullins	2-1	34.86	1
3rd	Homeside Knight	Tom Gates	14-1	35.26	2
4th	El Franco	Linda Mullins	14-1	35.42	4
5th	Bubbly Lad	Linda Jones	10-1	35.60	6
6th	Dalcash Sile	Tony Taylor	7-1	35.62	3

Laurent-Perrier Grand Prix, Walthamstow (Oct 3, 640m, £7,500)
Pos	Name of Greyhound	Trainer	SP	Time	Trap
1st	Dans Sport	Charlie Lister	6-1	39.79	6
2nd	Honest Lord	Lee Gifkins	2-5f	39.85	1
3rd	Scart Eight	Gary Baggs	25-1	39.95	4
4th	Farloe Bonus	Charlie Lister	4-1	40.09	5
5th	Farloe Bramble	Terry Dartnall	16-1	40.49	3
N/R	Lydpal Frankie	Tony Meek			

William Hill Laurels, Belle Vue (Oct 17, 460m, £6,000)
Pos	Name of Greyhound	Trainer	SP	Time	Trap
1st	Ardant Jimmy	Sandra Ralph	10-1	28.05	4
2nd	Ceekay	Linda Mullins	7-4	28.13	1
3rd	Ballygalda Mike	John Walton	16-1	28.15	2
4th	Quick Stop	Tony Lythgoe	25-1	28.23	3
5th	Tippins Garden	June McCombe	12-1	28.25	5
6th	Spoonbill Snowey	Michael Bacon	5-4f	28.43	6

Evening Standard TV Trophy, Wimbledon (Oct 13, 868m, £6,000)
Pos	Name of Greyhound	Trainer	SP	Time	Trap
1st	Note Book	Gary Adam	3-1	54.75	6
2nd	Thornfield Bob	Brian Murfin	5-1	55.01	5
3rd	Spenwood Wizard	Ron Hough	4-1	55.15	1
4th	Impulsive Girl	Chris Emmerson	7-4f	55.31	3
5th	Spenwood Gem	Ron Hough	5-1	55.43	2
6th	Annamore Blue	Ernie Wiley	33-1	55.81	4

Wendy Fair St Leger, Wembley (Nov 6, 655m, £12,000)
Pos	Name of Greyhound	Trainer	SP	Time	Trap
1st	Droopys Pacino	Tony Bullen	4-1	39.67	3
2nd	Lady Flyaway	Brian Clemenson	14-1	39.91	2
3rd	Hi Bob	David Pruhs	10-1	39.92	6
4th	Guest In Time	Brian Clemenson	7-2	39.95	5
5th	Let Me Run	Brian Clemenson	7-2	40.17	4
6th	Lydpal Frankie	Tony Meek	4-5f	40.20	1

Thoroughbred Investments Oaks, Wimbledon (Nov 12, 480m, £6,000)
Pos	Name of Greyhound	Trainer	SP	Time	Trap
1st	Sarah Dee	Nick Savva	6-4f	28.82	4
2nd	Droopys Maeve	Henry Tasker	5-2	28.86	5
3rd	Velvet Return	Charlie Lister	5-2	29.12	6
4th	Seskin Judy	Angie Kibble	3-1	29.13	1
5th	Westmead Gigi	Nick Savva	10-1	29.27	2
6th	Pure Penny	Jason Foster	12-1	29.91	3

William Hill Cesarewitch, Catford (Dec 5, 718m, £5,000)
Pos	Name of Greyhound	Trainer	SP	Time	Trap
1st	Fourth Ace	Barry Wileman	9-4	47.01	1
2nd	Droopys Paul (dh)	Linda Mullins	1-2f	47.11	2
2nd	El Onda (dh)	Linda Mullins	9-2	47.11	4
4th	Catch Mona	Brian Clemenson	10-1	47.61	3
N/R	Piercestown Gift	Mick Bailey			
N/R	Magpie Miss	Ernie Gaskin Sr.			

dh=dead heat

== Totalisator returns ==
Extended content

The totalisator returns declared to the National Greyhound Racing Club for the year 1998 are listed below.

Stadium	Turnover £
London (Walthamstow)	11,944,657
London (Wimbledon)	8,455,306
Romford	7,326,179
Manchester (Belle Vue)	4,925,733
Birmingham (Hall Green)	4,738,521
Brighton & Hove	4,738,292
London (Catford)	3,376,356
Sheffield (Owlerton)	2,894,945
Peterborough	2,891,227
Birmingham (Perry Barr)	2,553,614
Crayford	2,478,003

Stadium	Turnover £
Sunderland	2,131,724
Poole	1,750,882
Wolverhampton (Monmore)	1,651,061
Glasgow (Shawfield)	1,647,828
London (Wembley)	1,538,480
Oxford	1,526,708
Milton Keynes	1,503,990
Nottingham	1,472,640
Portsmouth	1,328,722
Yarmouth	1,310,523
Newcastle (Brough Park)	1,204,602

Stadium	Turnover £
Reading	1,114,281
Swindon	819,064
Harlow	784,315
Sittingbourne	701,967
Canterbury	637,481
Hull (New Craven Park)	483,231
Doncaster (Stainforth)	306,486
Rye House	196,420
Mildenhall	191,172
Swaffham	189,398
Henlow (Bedfordshire)	171,158
