= Yorkshire St Leger =

Greyhound racing competition in Doncaster, England

- Class: Category 2
- Location: Doncaster Greyhound Stadium
- Inaugurated: 2005
- Sponsor: BGBF

Race information
- Distance: 661 metres
- Surface: Sand
- Purse: £3,000 (winner)

The Yorkshire St Leger also known as the Doncaster St Leger is a greyhound racing competition held annually at Doncaster Greyhound Stadium.

It was inaugurated in 2005 and offered a prize of £12,000 in 2019. The event was not held from 2020 to 2022 but returned in 2023, with reduced winner's prize money of £3,000.

== Venues & Distances ==
- 2005–present (Doncaster 661m)

== Sponsors ==
- 2015–2016 (Pinpoint Recruitment)
- 2017–2019 (S.I.S)
- 2023–present (BGBF)

== Past winners ==
Year	Winner	Breeding	Trainer	Time	SP
2005	Farloe Divide	Toms The Best – Ena Harkness	Charlie Lister OBE (Private)	41.35	6-1
2006	Larkhill Bird	Stately Bird – Ellies Amy	Michael Walsh (Pelaw Grange)	41.06	1-1f
2007	Larkhill Bird	Stately Bird – Ellies Amy	Michael Walsh (Pelaw Grange)	41.37	9-2
2008	Bubbly Totti	World Class – Droopys Seville	Ted Soppitt (Private)	41.81	4-6f
2009	Capel Smiley	Droopys Scolari – Garlyn Judy	Tony Gifkins (Private)	41.34	33-1
2010	Carbarns Tom	Jordans Elect – Me Misty	Charlie Lister OBE (Private)	41.87	8-1
2011	Lonely Boy	Digital – Moss Jumper	Charlie Lister OBE (Private)	41.08	6-4f
2012	Peggys Style	Westmead Hawk – O Learys Peggy	Chris Allsopp (Monmore)	42.21	10-1
2013	Fear Emoski	Top Honcho – Kildallon Maid	Charlie Lister OBE (Private)	41.35	8-11f
2014	Millwards Teddy	Westmead Hawk – Droopys Solange	Dean Childs (Hove)	41.34	2-1f
2015	Swift Curie	Vans Escalade – Swift Eva	Russ Warren (Sheffield)	41.23	3-1
2016	Rubys Rascal	Razldazl George – Swift Eva	Mark Wallis (Towcester)	41.10	5-4f
2017	Keplar Nine	Kinloch Brae - Any Time Again	Charlie Lister OBE (Private)	41.36	5-1
2018	Roxholme Poppy	Aero Majestic - Pookies Sophie	Hayley Keightley (Doncaster)	41.74	5-2jf
2019	Droopys Live	Tullymurry Act - Live Queen	Angela Harrison (Newcastle)	41.65	7-2
not held from 2020 to 2022
2023	Fabulous Dyna	Superman – Buckos Lass	Laurence Tuffin (Towcester)	42.16	11/4
