= 1988 Irish Greyhound Derby =

1988 Respond Irish Greyhound Derby
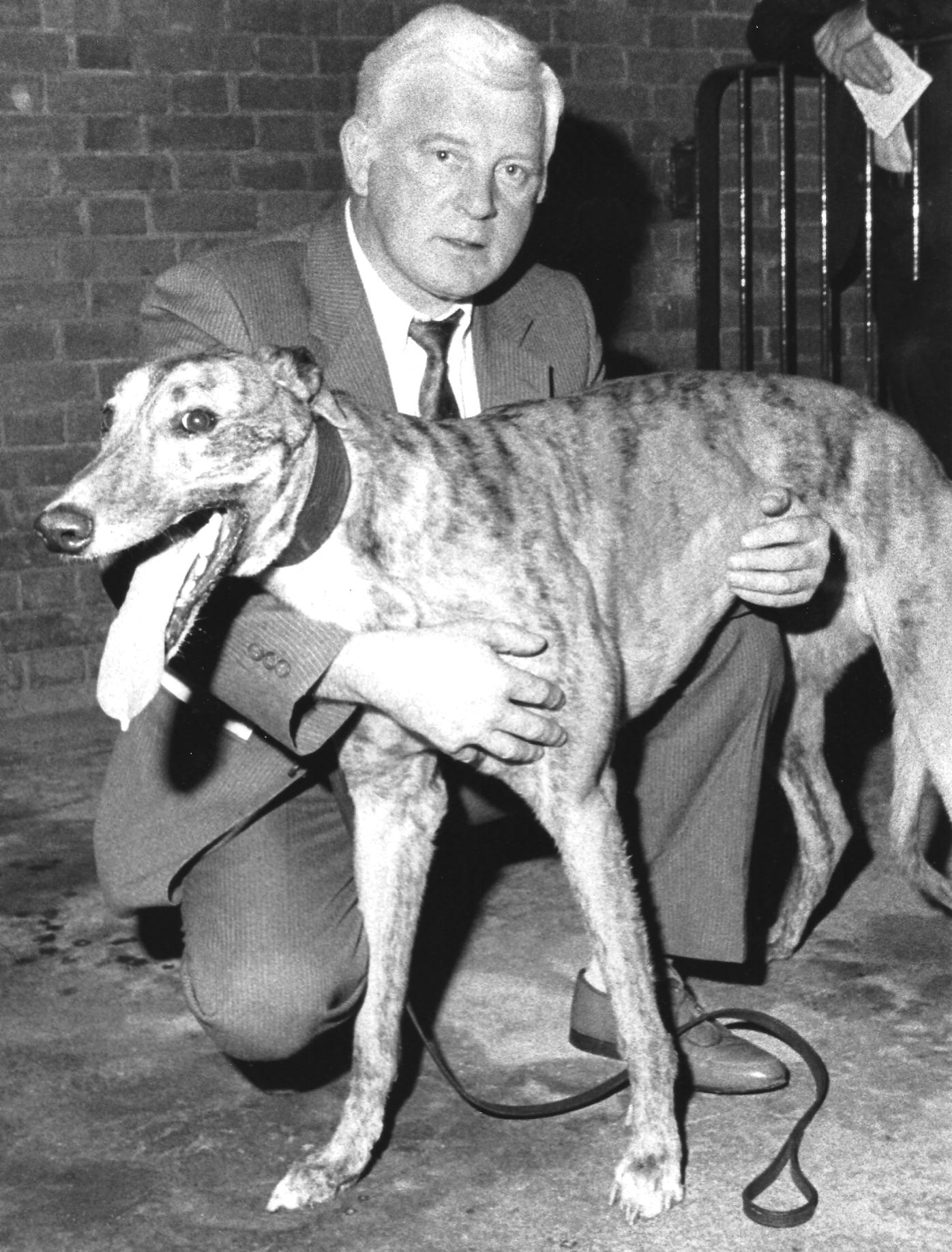
- Make History with John Quigley
- Venue: Shelbourne Park
- Location: Dublin
- End date: 17 September
- Total prize money: £30,000 (winner)

The 1988 Irish Greyhound Derby took place during August and September with the final being held at Shelbourne Park in Dublin on 17 September 1988.

The winner Make History won £30,000 and was trained by Johnny Quigley, owned by Paul McKinney & John Kelly and bred by Ramie Dowling (a former Kilkenny hurling star). The race was sponsored by the Kerry Group's dog food product 'Respond' for the first time.

== Final result ==
At Shelbourne, 17 September (over 550 yards):

Position	Winner	Breeding	Trap	SP	Time	Trainer
1st	Make History	Game Ball -Raymonds Pride	6	5-1	30.26	Johnny Quigley
2nd	Manorville Magic	Manorville Sand - Black Vision	5	5-1	30.32	Paddy Doran
3rd	Randy	Aulton Villa - Melanie	1	5-4f	30.38	Christy Daly
4th	Ardfert Sean	Easy and Slow - Keilduff Fun	3	5-2	30.64	Matt O'Donnell
5th	Chicita Banana	Sail On II - Bonita Banana	2	12-1	30.67	Pat Quinn
6th	Odell Schooner	Sail On II - Odell Tansy	4	16-1	31.23	Ron Peckover

=== Distances ===
¾, ¾, 3¼, neck, 5¾ (lengths)

== Competition Report ==
After many years of Carrolls sponsorship the Kerry Group took over advertising their Respond dog food product so the event would be known as the Respond Irish Derby. Leading the entries was the 1987 Puppy Derby champion and 1988 English Greyhound Derby finalist Make History (trained by Johnny Quigley) and the 1987 Irish Greyhound Derby finalists Randy and Ardfert Sean.

In the first round Randy was fastest in 30.36 sec, justifying large ante-post bets but there was bad news for Satharn Beo who had to be retired following a serious wrist injury. In the second round it was the turn of Ardfert Sean to impress timed at 30.08. Randy and Make History also won.

In round three Make History, Randy and Ardfert Sean all completed another victory. The three semi-finals saw Randy catch Make History on the line in 30.32 and then Ardfert Sean defeated Manorville Magic in 30.44. The last semi resulted in the 1,025 yards TV trophy runner-up Chicita Banana come home ahead of the English challenger Odell Schooner in 30.33. Chicita Banana had been bought by Harry Findlay and would soon be on the way to John 'Ginger' McGee.

In the final Make History showed first from Randy and Manorville Magic whilst Ardfert Sean missed his break. Randy challenged Make History at the third bend but was cut off allowing Manorville Magic to overtake Randy but it was too late for him to catch Make History.

== See also ==
- 1988 UK & Ireland Greyhound Racing Year
