= 2001 Irish Greyhound Derby =

2001 Paddy Power Irish Greyhound Derby
- Venue: Shelbourne Park
- Location: Dublin
- Start date: 16 August
- End date: 15 September
- Total prize money: £100,000 (winner)

The 2001 Irish Greyhound Derby took place during August and September with the final being held at Shelbourne Park in Dublin on 15 September 2001.

The winner Cool Performance won £100,000 and was trained by Sean Bourke, owned by Patsy Byrne & Mick Gleeson and bred by P J Keane. The race was sponsored by the Paddy Power.

== Final result ==
At Shelbourne, 15 September (over 550 yards):

Position	Winner	Breeding	Trap	SP	Time	Trainer
1st	Cool Performance	Mustang Jack - Pony Nikita	5	7-2	30.01	Sean Bourke
2nd	Late Late Show	Spiral Nikita - Ullid Citrate	6	3-1	30.02	Paul Hennessy
3rd	Dale Inferno	Westmead Merlin - Ladywell Girl	1	33-1	30.07	Fraser Black
4th	Droopys Vieri	Top Honcho - Droopys Fergie	2	7-4f	30.09	Paul Young (England)
5th	Tinys Bud	Larkhill Jo - Perrys Pusher	3	16-1	30.11	Nick Savva (England)
6th	Droopys Kewell	Larkhill Jo - Perrys Pusher	4	4-1	30.29	Michael Dunphy

=== Distances ===
short-head, ½, head, head, 2¼ (lengths)

== Competition Report ==
The leading Irish entry for the 2001 event was a greyhound called Late Late Show, owned by television and radio chat show host Pat Kenny. The greyhound had gained national fame and was running for charity. The Paul Hennessy trained black dog had won 17 of his last 19 races including a winning sequence of 16. he had won the Tote Gold Cup, Easter Cup and Euro Off-Track with earnings of £83,000 to date. Also expected to go well was Cool Performance, a greyhound that had broken his hock on two occasions since winning the Puppy Derby, he had been purchased by Patsy Byrne and had failed to make the 2001 English Greyhound Derby, for which he had been bought, due to his injuries. The English challenge was led by Sonic Flight and Droopys Vieri.

Rhincrew Tops went fastest in round one with a 29.82, Premier County recorded 29.84 and Sonic Flight 29.92 in other wins. A remarkable second round saw the track record broken twice; Droopys Vieri set a new Shelbourne record timed at 29.57 and just four races later Cool Performance equalled the new record. Sonic Flight was eliminated and the Late Late Show continued his customary late pace in races to get through to the next round.

Double Oaks champion Marinas Tina finished lame in quarter finals on a night when three of the heat winners recorded the same time of 29.83; they were Droopys Vieri, Cool Performance and Premier County.

Droopys Kewell won the first semi-final from the strong finishing Late Late Show and Cool Performance. A scrappy second semi-final race ended with success for Droopys Vieri from Dale Inferno and Tinys Bud. Premier County was eliminated after suffering from trouble but would ease to victory in the consolation final.

Tinys Bud took a slight lead when the final got underway, she was followed closely by Cool Performance and Droopys Kewell, but the latter was forced to check. Down the back straight the positions remained the same, with Droopys Vieri now making progress. Cool Performance gained a third bend lead with Droopys Vieri now very close behind but Late Late Show was now also gaining ground after encountering trouble early on. Cool Performance still led near the finishing line and held off the field and in particular the Late Late Show. The pair crossed the line in a photo finish with five runners just over a length apart. The photo finish gave Cool Performance the verdict from Late Late Show and the trophy was presented by Bertie Ahern.

== Quarter finals ==
Heat 1 (Sep 1)
Pos	Name	SP	Time
1st	Droopys Vieri	7-4f	29.83
2nd	Droopys Kewell	9-4	29.97
3rd	Allen Brandy	7-1	30.25
4th	Kegans Glory	10-1	30.39
5th	Long Valley Max	6-1	30.53
6th	Hard Talking	16-1	00.00

Heat 2 (Sep 1)
Pos	Name	SP	Time
1st	Cool Performance	11-8f	29.83
2nd	Annual Award	9-2	30.32
3rd	Fact File	5-1	30.39
4th	Spring Motion	8-1	30.41
5th	Tyrur Bello	6-1	30.44
6th	Mr President	50-1	30.48

Heat 3 (Sep 1)
Pos	Name	SP	Time
1st	Premier County	11-10f	29.83
2nd	Tinys Bud	7-2	29.86
3rd	Dale Inferno	12-1	29.97
4th	Rhincrew James	8-1	29.98
5th	Geordie Melody	33-1	30.29
6th	Marinas Tina	3-1	30.64

Heat 4 (Sep 1)
Pos	Name	SP	Time
1st	Persian Tom	7-1	30.14
2nd	Vina Marina	12-1	30.24
3rd	Late Late Show	4-7f	30.24
4th	Deerfield Park	7-1	30.31
5th	Extra Dividend	25-1	30.37
6th	Brother Jo	14-1	30.44

== Semi finals ==
First Semi Final (Sep 8)
Pos	Name of Greyhound	SP	Time
1st	Droopys Kewell	7-2	29.82
2nd	Late Late Show	5-1	29.92
3rd	Cool Performance	4-5f	30.06
4th	Annual Award	14-1	30.38
5th	Fact File	14-1	30.48
6th	Allen Brandy	14-1	30.90

Second Semi Final (Sep 8)
Pos	Name of Greyhound	SP	Time
1st	Droopys Vieri	11-10f	29.93
2nd	Dale Inferno	14-1	30.07
3rd	Tinys Bud	9-2	30.08
4th	Premier County	11-4	30.18
5th	Vina Marina	33-1	30.39
6th	Persian Tom	10-1	30.53

== See also ==
- 2001 UK & Ireland Greyhound Racing Year
