= 1998 Irish Greyhound Derby =

1998 Ireland on Sunday Irish Greyhound Derby
- Venue: Shelbourne Park
- Location: Dublin
- End date: 19 September
- Total prize money: £50,000 (winner)

The 1998 Irish Greyhound Derby took place during August and September with the final being held at Shelbourne Park in Dublin on 19 September 1998.

The winner Eyeman won £50,000 and was trained by Eddie Wade, owned by Gerard Kervick and bred by Jim Moore. The race was sponsored by the Ireland on Sunday.

== Final result ==
At Shelbourne, 19 September (over 550 yards):

Position	Winner	Breeding	Trap	SP	Time	Trainer
1st	Eyeman	Double Bid - Minglers Magic	1	6-4f	30.09	Eddie Wade
2nd	Cool Panther	Cool Prince - Queen Panther	4	16-1	30.13	Phil McCormack
3rd	Larkhill Jo	Staplers Jo - Westmead Flight	6	9-4	30.14	Nick Savva
4th	Odell Duke	Cry Dalcash - Odell Bess	3	20-1	30.30	Ned Power
5th	Group Order	Vintage Prince - Sunset Blonde	2	12-1	30.34	Joe Kenny
6th	Tuesdays Davy	Phantom Flash - Likely Wish	5	4-1	30.74	Patsy Byrne

=== Distances ===
½, short-head, 2, ½, 5 (lengths)

== Competition Report ==
In the qualifying round Eyeman trained by Eddie Wade equalled Dew Reward's track record of 29.97 and immediately became the favourite for the competition. Larkhill Jo then posted a very fast 30.00 and the original ante-post favourite Plasterscene Gem drifted in the betting despite winning his heat.

In the second round the fastest winners were She Will Survive in 30.24, Westpark Lemon and Droopys Eric in 30.25. Eyeman then broke the Shelbourne track record again in the quarter-finals, the brindle dog stopped the clock at 29.92.

Larkhill Jo won the first semi-final winning by six lengths from Odell Duke and Group Order. Eyeman continued to impress and took the second heat from the fast finishing 1998 English Greyhound Derby runner-up Tuesdays Davy and Cool Panther.

The pivotal moment in the final came when Larkhill Jo was forced wide by Tuesdays Davy and Cool Panther, this left Eyeman three lengths clear. Larkhill Jo and Cool Panther gained ground on Eyeman but then crowded each other off the fourth bend before challenging Eyeman on the run in. Eyeman held on and passed the winning post first. Cool Panther finished second and Larkhill Jo finished third.

== See also ==
- 1998 UK & Ireland Greyhound Racing Year
