= 2001 English Greyhound Derby =

- Location: Wimbledon Stadium
- Start date: 4 May
- End date: 2 June
- Total prize money: £75,000 (winner)

The 2001 William Hill Greyhound Derby Final took place during May and June with the final being held on 2 June 2001 at Wimbledon Stadium. The winner received £75,000. Rapid Ranger successfully defended his title and became only the third greyhound in history to win the Derby twice, he was owned by Ray White and bred by Martin Broughan. Two of the finalists Smoking Bullet and Countrywide Tams were owned by Vinnie Jones.

== Final result ==
At Wimbledon (over 480 metres):

Position	Name of Greyhound	Breeding	Trap	Sectional	SP	Time	Trainer
1st	Rapid Ranger	Come On Ranger - Rapid Vienna	4	5.17	7-4	28.71	Charlie Lister (Private)
2nd	Sonic Flight	Frightful Flash - Westmead Flight	3	5.34	10-11f	28.97	Nick Savva (Private)
3rd	Castlelyons Dani	Spiral Nikita - Foxclose Daisy	2	5.28	14-1	29.09	Arthur Hitch (Private)
4th	Countrywide Tams	Lassa Java - Persian Spark	1	5.26	14-1	29.11	John McGee Sr. (Private)
5th	Smoking Bullet	Joyful Tidings - Aggies Vixen	5	5.28	10-1	29.39	Derek Knight (Hove)
6th	Droopys Honcho	Top Honcho - Droopys Fergie	6	5.30	7-1	29.41	Paul Young (Romford)

=== Distances ===
3¼, 1½, head, 3½, head (lengths)
The distances between the greyhounds are in finishing order and shown in lengths. One length is equal to 0.08 of one second.

=== Final Report ===
Rapid Ranger soon led and won comfortably from the strong finishing Scottish Derby champion Sonic Flight who had found trouble at the first bend along with Smoking Bullet and Droopys Honcho. Castlelyons Dani finished well for third after crowding and Countrywide Tams had a clear run.

== Quarter finals ==
Heat 1 (May 22)
Pos	Name	SP	Time
1st	Opus Magic	9-2	28.83
2nd	Castlelyons Dani	9-2	28.93
3rd	Smoking Bullet	1-1f	29.21
4th	Wallington Swift	50-1	29.23
5th	Cillowen Maestro	25-1	29.67
6th	Concorde Direct	5-2	29.68

Heat 2 (May 22)
Pos	Name	SP	Time
1st	Pinewood Blue	8-1	29.01
2nd	Rapid Ranger	1-4f	29.07
3rd	Glengar Visit	10-1	29.21
4th	Little Vintage	50-1	29.25
5th	Farloe Florish	5-1	29.29
6th	Blues Best Buzz	66-1	29.55

Heat 3 (May 22)
Pos	Name	SP	Time
1st	Micks Best Hero	2-1jf	28.97
2nd	Countrwide Tams	2-1jf	28.99
3rd	Droopys Honcho	4-1	29.59
4th	Carhumore Cross	9-2	29.62
5th	Thats Style	8-1	30.10
6th	Top Redondo	33-1	30.22

Heat 4 (May 22)
Pos	Name	SP	Time
1st	Sonic Flight	5-4f	28.95
2nd	Rackethall Jet	3-1	29.19
3rd	Proud Champ	3-1	29.45
4th	Swervys Cushtie	100-1	29.49
5th	I Will Yeah	66-1	29.55
6th	Druids Highline	8-1	29.81

== Semi finals ==
First Semi Final (May 26)
Pos	Name of Greyhound	SP	Time
1st	Sonic Flight	4-7f	28.67
2nd	Droopys Honcho	10-1	28.87
3rd	Castleyons Dani	14-1	28.89
4th	Opus Magic	6-1	29.23
5th	Rackethall Jet	5-1	29.35
6th	Glengar Visit	10-1	29.41

Second Semi Final (May 26)
Pos	Name of Greyhound	SP	Time
1st	Rapid Ranger	6-4f	28.80
2nd	Smoking Bullet	5-1	29.12
3rd	Countrywide Tams	6-1	29.18
4th	Pinewood Blue	5-1	29.32
5th	Micks Best Hero	5-1	29.34
6th	Proud Champ	12-1	29.50

== See also ==
- 2001 UK & Ireland Greyhound Racing Year
