= 1999 Irish Greyhound Derby =

1999 Ireland on Sunday Irish Greyhound Derby
- Venue: Shelbourne Park
- Location: Dublin
- End date: 18 September
- Total prize money: £60,000 (winner)

The 1999 Irish Greyhound Derby took place during August and September with the final being held at Shelbourne Park in Dublin on 18 September 1999.

The winner Spring Time won £60,000 and was trained and owned by Gerald Watson and bred by Charles Magill. The race was sponsored by the Ireland on Sunday.

== Final result ==
At Shelbourne, 18 September (over 550 yards):

Position	Winner	Breeding	Trap	SP	Time	Trainer
1st	Spring Time	Vintage Prince - Meantime	1	7-4f	30.00	Gerald Watson
2nd	Airmount Rover	Minnies Phantom - Airmount Venus	4	4-1	30.24	Ger Kiely
3rd	Badge of Tidings	Joyful Tidings - Killiney Ranger	6	4-1	30.52	Phil O'Brien
4th	Mr Bozz	Cry Dalcash - Terrys Whisper	3	3-1	30.60	Paul Hennessy
5th	Hi Dingle	Westmead Merlin - Fossabeg Maid	2	16-1	30.64	John Devlin
6th	Lodgefield Jack	Westmead Merlin - Lodgefield Lady	5	20-1	30.66	Peter Traynor

=== Distances ===
3, 3½, 1, 2, ½, head (lengths)

== Competition Report ==
Chart King returned to Ireland as the winner of the 1999 English Greyhound Derby and 1999 Scottish Greyhound Derby champion and went into the Irish Derby as the 7-2 ante-post favourite. Other leading contenders included English Derby finalist Deerfield Sunset.

Chart King won his first round heat in a fast 30.04. Frisby Full (Reggie Roberts) was fastest in 29.93 and there were also wins for Deerfield Sunset and triple major race winner Borna Survivor, he had already won the Produce Stakes, the Oaks and Dundalk International.

Round two saw Chart King complete sixteen consecutive wins by recording 29.94. Frisby Full won again in 29.96 as did Borna Survivor and Airmount Rover won well. The third round was the exact opposite if the second and the favourites tumbled out of the competition. Borna Survivor and Deerfield Sunset found trouble and were both eliminated behind Lodgefield Jack before Chart King ran poorly and failed to progress; he was retired to stud.

Mr Bozz won the first semi-final from Lodgefield Jack and Airmount Rover with hot favourite Frisby Full encountering trouble and exiting the event. Badge of Tidings completed proceedings in heat two beating Spring Time and Hi Dingle.

Spring Time was a well supported 7-4 favourite in the final after only one defeat in competition (the semi-finals). She justified the odds by winning comfortably by three lengths despite finding a little trouble during the race.

== See also ==
- 1999 UK & Ireland Greyhound Racing Year
