= 1988 UK & Ireland Greyhound Racing Year =

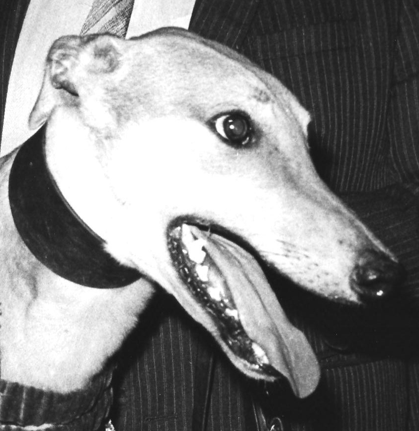
- Stouke Whisper reached his second English Derby final

The 1988 UK & Ireland Greyhound Racing Year was the 63rd year of greyhound racing in the United Kingdom and the 62nd year of greyhound racing in Ireland.

== Roll of honour ==
Major Winners
Award	Name of Winner
1988 English Greyhound Derby	Hit The Lid
1988 Irish Greyhound Derby	Make History
1988 Scottish Greyhound Derby	Killouragh Chris
Greyhound Trainer of the Year	John McGee Sr.
Greyhound of the Year	Hit The Lid
Irish Greyhound of the Year	Make History
Trainers Championship	Ernie Gaskin Sr.

== Summary ==
The sport was experiencing a mini boom, the National Greyhound Racing Club (NGRC) released the annual returns, with totalisator turnover up nearly 30% at £98,476,532 and attendances up over 10% recorded at 4,432,117 from 5465 meetings.

John McGee head man to Fred Wiseman was granted a trainer's licence and took charge of the kennel. He had a remarkable year as a rookie trainer winning the Greyhound Trainer of the Year and winning the 1988 English Greyhound Derby with Hit the Lid, the white and brindle dog owned by Fred Smith was also voted Greyhound of the Year. McGee also trained Sard who won the Gold Collar at Catford Stadium.

== Tracks ==
Despite the boom in business five tracks closed, Hull, Maidstone, Gosforth, Derby and Preston all closed. Hull finished because the landlords Hull Kingston Rovers moved to a new stadium. The closure of Gosforth left the city of Newcastle with just one licensed track at Brough Park. Preston and Derby had both been opened by the same company in 1933 and after 55 years of different owners found themselves closing at the same time. Powderhall would change ownership twice, it was sold by the Greyhound Racing Association (GRA) to local businessman Norrie Rowan for £1.8m, who then sold it on himself to Coral for an instant profit at £2.2m. The GRA lost the rights to the Scottish Greyhound Derby because they no longer owned any tracks in Scotland. Ellesmere Port Stadium started racing on 29 February.

== News ==
The NGRC announced that major competitions would no longer be listed as Classic races but instead they would be classed as Category One and Two races based on prize money levels. This led to many tracks that had previously never had the opportunity to hold a classic race offering increased prize money in order for their events to match the traditional classics in terms of status. The positive was that prize money increased, the negative was the devaluing of some of the sports most famous races in the following years.

Grass finally disappeared from greyhound racing when Hove became the last course to remove the turf as the circuit switched to sand. The first computerised form system called Formbank was introduced, created by Peter Shotton it revolutionised Racing Office practices and was the advent to modern day systems.

Trainer Barney O'Connor famous for running at Walthamstow died.

== Competitions ==
The Stewards' Cup at Walthamstow was claimed by Westmead Move, now four years old. Another bitch Exile Energy was the winner of the St Leger at Wembley, the black bitch had made the Grand Prix final and brought Gary Baggs back to the public attention for the first time since his split with Towfiq Al-Aali, his leading owner the previous year. Aali had his own success with Ernie Gaskin when his Derby finalist Comeragh Boy won the year ending Laurels. Gaskin also secured a trainers position at Walthamstow.

The successes of bitches during 1988 continued with Wendys Dream, who won the Oaks at Wimbledon, the Byrne International and Puppy Oaks.

== Principal UK races ==
Daily Mirror Grand National, Hall Green (Mar 26, 474m h, £3,000)
Pos	Name of Greyhound	Trainer	SP	Time	Trap
1st	Breeks Rocket	Dinky Luckhurst	5-1	30.09	5
2nd	Mackintosh Wishes		16-1	30.15	3
3rd	Melville Bob	Phil Rees Jr.	5-1	30.23	6
4th	Parktown Ranger	Tom Foster	6-4f	30.24	2
5th	Rosden Pilot	Norah McEllistrim	9-4	30.42	4
6th	French Pirate		25-1	30.62	1

BBC TV Trophy, Hall Green (April 8, 815m, £4,000)
Pos	Name of Greyhound	Trainer	SP	Time	Trap
1st	Minnies Siren	Terry Duggan	16-1	52.50+	6
2nd	Decoy Princess	Mrs D Lucas	11-4	52.84	1
3rd	Decoy Madonna	Mrs D Lucas	7-1	53.10	5
4th	Silver Mask	Bill Masters	9-2	53.22	4
5th	Role of Fame	Arthur Hitch	9-4f	53.36	2
6th	Super Duchess	Kim Marlow	9-2	53.64	4

+Track Record

David Richardson Scurry Gold Cup, Catford (Jul 16, 385m, £6,000)
Pos	Name of Greyhound	Trainer	SP	Time	Trap
1st	Farncombe Black	Ernie Gaskin Sr.	8-13f	23.53	3
2nd	Lissadell Tiger	Ernie Gaskin Sr.	4-1	23.61	6
3rd	Why That	Phil Henwood	50-1	23.87	2
4th	My Tallyho Two	Arthur Hitch	7-2	23.88	5
5th	Dempsey Flash	Arthur Boyce	33-1	23.96	4
6th	Boo Favourite	Les Lawrence	20-1	24.00	1

Scottish Greyhound Derby, Powderhall (Aug 30, 465m, £7,000)
Pos	Name of Greyhound	Trainer	SP	Time	Trap
1st	Killouragh Chris	Pete Beaumont	6-4f	28.75	3
2nd	Karens Champ	Gary Baggs	6-1	28.78	5
3rd	Festival Wonder	Matt O'Sullivan	4-1	28.79	1
4th	Lacca Spark	Hugh Davies	40-1	28.82	2
5th	Claremont Moral	Pete Beaumont	33-1	29.00	4
6th	Greenpark Fox	Michael O'Sullivan	7-4	29.04	6

John Humphreys Gold Collar, Catford (Sep 17, 555m, £6,000)
Pos	Name of Greyhound	Trainer	SP	Time	Trap
1st	Sard	John McGee Sr.	6-4	34.61	3
2nd	Bankers Benefit	Adam Jackson	8-1	34.83	1
3rd	Down West	Terry Atkins	50-1	35.23	5
4th	Blue Emblem	Ernie Gaskin Sr.	6-1	35.33	2
5th	Silver Chance	John Honeysett	20-1	35.36	4
6th	Curryhills Press	Barry Silkman	5-4f	35.39	6

Track Bookmakers Cesarewitch, Belle Vue (Sep 24, 853m, £3,000)
Pos	Name of Greyhound	Trainer	SP	Time	Trap
1st	Proud To Run	Harry White	7-1	56.33	1
2nd	Decoy Madonna	Mrs D Lucas	2-1jf	56.47	3
3rd	Ballylarkin Mini	Lionel Maxen	2-1jf	56.59	4
4th	Manx Marajaz	Nigel Saunders	7-2	56.87	5
5th	Astrosyn Trace	Derek Knight	10-1	57.03	6
N/R	Sams Wonderboy				

John Power Grand Prix, Walthamstow (Oct 8, 640m, £7,500)
Pos	Name of Greyhound	Trainer	SP	Time	Trap
1st	Digby Bridge	John Malcolm	50-1	40.14	3
2nd	Bad Intentions	John Ripley	25-1	40.22	1
3rd	Exile Energy	Gary Baggs	3-1	40.40	5
4th	Going For Glory	Kim Marlow	5-1	40.50	6
5th	Bankers Benefit	Adam Jackson	5-1	40.84	4
6th	Waltham Abbey	Adam Jackson	11-10f	00.00	2

Oaks, Wimbledon (Oct 29, 480m, £6,000)
Pos	Name of Greyhound	Trainer	SP	Time	Trap
1st	Wendys Dream	Tommy Foster	4-5f	28.81	2
2nd	Carriglea Ese	Paddy Hancox	7-1	29.01	1
3rd	Hillville Blonde	Bertie Gaynor	12-1	29.25	3
4th	Barnacuiga Lass	Geoff De Mulder	16-1	29.37	6
5th	Westmead Move	Natalie Savva	3-1	29.38	5
6th	Kilbeg Judy	Kenny Linzell	16-1	29.60	4

St Leger, Wembley (Nov 18, 655m, £8,000)
Pos	Name of Greyhound	Trainer	SP	Time	Trap
1st	Exile Energy	Gary Baggs	9-2	39.76	4
2nd	Westmead Pulse	Natalie Savva	4-1	39.94	5
3rd	Down West	Terry Atkins	14-1	40.08	6
4th	Jerpoint Diamond	Bernie Doyle	1-1f	40.14	1
5th	Super Supreme	Ken Reynolds	11-2	40.20	3
6th	Roseville Jackie	Geoff De Mulder	33-1	40.36	2

Ike Morris Laurels, Wimbledon (Dec 27, 460m, £6,000)
Pos	Name of Greyhound	Trainer	SP	Time	Trap
1st	Comeragh Boy	Ernie Gaskin Sr.	6-4f	27.86	6
2nd	Pond Hurricane	Harry Williams	4-1	27.96	1
3rd	Attractive Son	Ger McKenna	6-1	27.97	2
4th	Captains Trail	Phil Rees Jr.	3-1	28.13	3
5th	Paper Whisper	Arthur Hitch	33-1	28.19	5
6th	Festival Wonder	John McGee Sr.	10-1	28.63	4

== Totalisator returns ==
Extended content

The totalisator returns declared to the National Greyhound Racing Club for the year 1988 are listed below.

Stadium	Turnover £
London (Wimbledon)	16,593,590
London (Walthamstow)	16,355,089
Romford	7,418,073
Brighton & Hove	6,597,798
London (Catford)	6,277,629
London (Wembley)	5,943,058
Birmingham (Hall Green)	4,315,543
Manchester (Belle Vue)	3,538,593
Crayford	3,109,417
Oxford	2,294,967
Edinburgh (Powderhall)	2,147,110

Stadium	Turnover £
Glasgow (Shawfield)	2,009,688
Newcastle (Brough Park)	1,919,854
Sheffield (Owlerton)	1,782,333
Ramsgate	1,747,160
Wolverhampton (Monmore)	1,657,914
Portsmouth	1,529,916
Yarmouth	1,363,609
Reading	1,218,086
Swindon	1,100,563
Bristol	1,057,112
Milton Keynes	1,025,807

Stadium	Turnover £
Canterbury	950,524
London (Hackney)	848,834
Rye House	648,808
Poole	647,432
Hull (Old Craven Park)	603,508
Henlow (Bedfordshire)	595,251
Peterborough	417,070
Cradley Heath	400,748
Middlesbrough	369,815
Nottingham	344,331
Swaffham	305,964
