= 2000 English Greyhound Derby =

Races at Wimbledon Stadium, London

- Location: Wimbledon Stadium
- Start date: 5 May
- End date: 3 June
- Total prize money: £75,000 (winner)

The 2000 William Hill Greyhound Derby took place during May and June with the final being held on 3 June 2000 at Wimbledon Stadium. The winner Rapid Ranger received £75,000. One of the finalists Smoking Bullet was owned by Vinnie Jones.

== Final result ==
At Wimbledon (over 480 metres):

Position	Name of Greyhound	Breeding	Trap	SP	Time	Trainer
1st	Rapid Ranger	Come On Ranger - Rapid Vienna	2	7-4f	28.71	Charlie Lister (Private)
2nd	Rackethall Jet	Mountleader Peer - Tracys Lady	3	7-1	28.97	Patsy Byrne (Wimbledon)
3rd	Greenfield Deal	Spiral Nikita - Dainty Model	4	14-1	29.11	Linda Jones (Walthamstow)
4th	Deerfield Sunset	Vintage Prince - Sunset Blonde	1	2-1	29.13	Owen McKenna (Ireland)
5th	Smoking Bullet	Joyful Tidings - Aggies Vixen	5	8-1	29.65	Derek Knight (Hove)
6th	Farloe Club	April Trio - Farloe Dancer	6	3-1	29.81	Graeme Frew (Private)

=== Distances ===
3¼, 1¾, head, 6½, 2 (lengths)
The distances between the greyhounds are in finishing order and shown in lengths. One length is equal to 0.08 of one second.

=== Competition Report ===
Four greyhounds were installed as 16-1 joint favourites in the ante post lists; they were Juvenile and Byrne International winner Knockanroe Rover, Laurels, All England Cup and Birmingham Cup champion Derbay Flyer, Eclipse champion Mumble Swerve and the Nick Savva trained Sonic Flight. In the final Rapid Ranger vied for the lead with Deerfield Sunset on his inside before Rapid Ranger pulled clear and won easily.

== Quarter finals ==
Heat 1 – 23 May 2000
Pos	Name	SP	Time
1st	Rapid Ranger	10-11f	28.61
2nd	Rackethall Jet	9-4	28.77
3rd	Judicial Pride	3-1	28.99
4th	Woodbrook Wine	50-1	29.49
5th	No Matter How	20-1	29.65
6th	Now Its Official	50-1	29.67

Heat 2 – 23 May 2000
Pos	Name	SP	Time
1st	Blue Tex	6-1	28.69
2nd	Dilemmas Lad	14-1	29.19
3rd	Rio Riccardo	4-5f	29.25
4th	Reactabond Rebel	6-4	29.29
5th	Who Knows	66-1	29.33
6th	El Verdi	20-1	29.49

Heat 3 – 23 May 2000
Pos	Name	SP	Time
1st	Smoking Bullet	5-2	29.03
2nd	Derbay Flyer	4-6f	29.37
3rd	Basils Picture	14-1	29.39
4th	Concorde Rascal	16-1	29.40
5th	Munroe Pride	50-1	29.44
6th	Jicky	6-1	29.58

Heat 4 – 23 May 2000
Pos	Name	SP	Time
1st	Farloe Club	5-1	28.98
2nd	Greenfield Deal	5-1	29.00
3rd	Deerfield Sunset	11-8f	29.04
4th	Barefoot Ridge	6-1	29.16
5th	Vintage Cleaner	7-2	29.22
6th	Coolfadda Flyer	16-1	29.26

== Semi finals ==
First Semi Final – 27 May 2000
Pos	Name of Greyhound	SP	Time
1st	Farloe Club	6-1	28.97
2nd	Rapid Ranger	5-4f	29.01
3rd	Greenfield Deal	9-2	29.07
4th	Dilemmas Lad	25-1	29.37
5th	Derbay Flyer	8-1	29.45
6th	Blue Tex	3-1	29.55

Second Semi Final – 27 May 2000
Pos	Name of Greyhound	SP	Time
1st	Deerfield Sunset	5-2	28.79
2nd	Rackethall Jet	7-2	28.95
3rd	Smoking Bullet	3-1	28.95
4th	Rio Riccardo	9-4f	28.96
5th	Basils Picture	14-1	29.06
6th	Judicial Pride	14-1	29.30

== See also ==
- 2000 UK & Ireland Greyhound Racing Year
