= 1999 English Greyhound Derby =

Greyhound race

- Location: Wimbledon Stadium
- End date: 26 June
- Total prize money: £50,000 (winner)

The 1999 William Hill Greyhound Derby took place during May and June with the final being held on 26 June 1999 at Wimbledon Stadium. The winner Chart King received £50,000 and returned to Ireland as the newly crowned English and Scottish Greyhound Derby champion.

== Final result ==
At Wimbledon (over 480 metres):

Position	Name of Greyhound	Breeding	Trap	SP	Time	Trainer
1st	Chart King	Trade Official - Clarinka Sand	6	8-11f	28.67	Ralph Hewitt (Ireland)
2nd	Frisby Full	Frightful Flash - Centenarys Dream	5	66-1	28.79	Harry Crapper (Sheffield)
3rd	Deerfield Sunset	Vintage Prince - Sunset Blonde	1	11-10	28.81	Ger McKenna (Ireland)
4th	Secret Crystal	Summerhill Gift - Creole Lady	4	25-1	29.01	Linda Jones (Romford)
5th	Pottos Storm	Droopys Fintan - Certain Way	3	66-1	29.02	David Mullins (Romford)
6th	Pure Patches	Arrigle Buddy - Pure Princess	2	66-1	00.00	Dinky Luckhurst (Crayford)

=== Distances ===
1½, head, 2½, short head, Dis (lengths)
The distances between the greyhounds are in finishing order and shown in lengths. One length is equal to 0.08 of one second.

=== Race Report ===
The rank outsider Frisby Full was first from the traps and led the two Irish runners Chart King and Deerfield Sunset until the third bend. Chart King and Deerfield Sunset then drew alongside, with the former getting the room at the bend and going on to win by just over a length from Frisby Full with Deerfield Sunset finishing third. Pottos Storm finished a creditable fifth, a good achievement for a greyhound associated with hurdling, he had won the 1999 Grand National. Pure Patches was knocked over and finished last.

== Quarter finals ==
Heat 1 (Jun 15)
Pos	Name	SP	Time
1st	Secret Crystal	2-1	28.71
2nd	Farloe Storm	20-1	29.07
3rd	Listen to This	33-1	29.15
4th	Mustang Melody	7-1	29.18
5th	Time N Tide	3-1	29.24
6th	Farloe Bramble	5-4f	29.36

Heat 2 (Jun 15)
Pos	Name	SP	Time
1st	Deerfield Sunset	1-5f	28.51
2nd	Dower Leader	6-1	28.85
3rd	Pottos Storm	14-1	28.93
4th	Clondara Hiker	16-1	29.29
5th	Athea Storm	100-1	29.47
6th	Gurranebeg Dan	33-1	29.53

Heat 3 (Jun 15)
Pos	Name	SP	Time
1st	Stay For Tony	16-1	28.72
2nd	Stouke Tim	4-1	28.82
3rd	Race First	7-2	28.92
4th	El Hombre	11-8f	29.10
5th	Lung of Iron	20-1	29.40
6th	First Issue	8-1	29.42

Heat 4 (Jun 15)
Pos	Name	SP	Time
1st	Chart King	2-5f	28.67
2nd	Pure Patches	4-1	28.89
3rd	Frisby Full	7-1	29.07
4th	Kerwex Rose	8-1	29.09
5th	Curley Tresa	25-1	29.19
6th	Winter Ray	25-1	00.00

== Semi finals ==
First Semi Final (Jun 19)
Pos	Name of Greyhound	SP	Time
1st	Pure Patches	7-2	29.07
2nd	Secret Crystal	7-4f	29.13
3rd	Frisby Full	6-1	29.15
4th	Stouke Tim	8-1	29.18
5th	Race First	5-1	29.23
6th	Stay For Tony	5-1	29.53

Second Semi Final (Jun 19)
Pos	Name of Greyhound	SP	Time
1st	Chart King	5-4	28.63
2nd	Deerfield Sunset	4-6f	28.85
3rd	Pottos Storm	25-1	29.11
4th	Dower Leader	20-1	29.31
5th	Listen to This	100-1	29.33
6th	Farloe Storm	100-1	29.43

== See also ==
- 1999 UK & Ireland Greyhound Racing Year
