= 1988 English Greyhound Derby =

1988 edition of the English Greyhound Derby

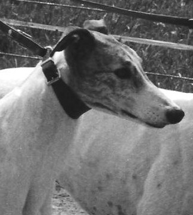
- Hi the Lid
- Location: Wimbledon Stadium
- End date: 30 June
- Total prize money: £30,000 (winner)

The 1988 Daily Mirror Greyhound Derby took place during May and June with the final being held on 30 June 1988 at Wimbledon Stadium. The winner was Hit The Lid and the winning owner Fred Smith (a London businessman) received £30,000. The competition was sponsored by the Daily Mirror.

== Final result ==
At Wimbledon (over 480 metres):

Position	Name of Greyhound	Breeding	Trap	SP	Time	Trainer
1st	Hit The Lid	Soda Fountain - Cailin Dubh	6	3-1	28.53	John McGee Sr. (Canterbury)
2nd	Stouke Whisper	Whisper Wishes - Stouke Playgirl	3	7-1	28.63	John Honeysett (Wembley)
3rd	Curryhills Gara	Linda's Champion - Moygara Soda	1	6-4f	28.75	Ernie Gaskin Sr. (Private)
4th	Make History	Game Ball - Raymonds Pride	4	3-1	28.83	John Quigley (Ireland)
5th	Gino	Ballyheigue Moon - Model Snowdrop	2	12-1	28.85	John McGee Sr. (Canterbury)
6th	Comeragh Boy	Moral Support - August Morning	5	6-1	29.27	Ernie Gaskin Sr. (Private)

=== Distances ===
1¼, 1½, 1, neck, 5¼ (lengths)
The distances between the greyhounds are in finishing order and shown in lengths. One length is equal to 0.08 of one second.

== Competition Report ==
The Irish challenge was led by a ante-post favourite Summerhill Gem trained by Michael Enright. Irish Puppy Derby champion Make History and Bold Rabbit from the Ger McKenna kennel were two more leading Irish challengers.

Summerhill Gem did not last long going out in the qualifying round as did the 1987 English Greyhound Derby finalist Rikasso Tiller. Notable performances in the qualifying round came from Blue Riband champion Pike Alert, Scottish Greyhound Derby runner up Killouragh Chris, Pall Mall Stakes champion Fearless Ace, Curryhills Gara, Hit The Lid and Bold Rabbit.

During the first round Pike Alert went out and Killouragh Chris despite finishing third in the same heat dislocated a toe and withdrew. The Wimbledon 460 metres track record holder Sam Bridge claimed the fastest heat win in 28.74. Another local dog Carrivekeeney won again as did Bold Rabbit and 1987 finalist Stouke Whisper. Another Wimbledon greyhound Captains Trail was to win in the second round defeating Bold Rabbit. Sam Bridge won again demoting Curryhills Gara into second place and Stouke Whisper won a heat that saw Arc champion Foretop go out. Hit The Lid and Fearless Ace continued their good form winning on the way to the quarter finals.

Make History won the first quarter-final with Sam Bridge finishing last and lame. Comeragh Boy won the second before Hit the Lid outpaced Bold Rabbit in the third. Stouke Whisper defeated Curryhills Gara and Fearless Ace in the last heat.

Curryhills Gara won the first semi-final with second and third going to the John McGee pair of Hit The Lid and Irish Greyhound Derby finalist Gino who had moved to McGee from Meek. Fearless Ace and Bold Rabbit hit each other and went out. The weaker second semi led to a Make History victory from Comeragh Boy with Stouke Whisper finishing third to make the Derby final once again.

In the final the favourite Curryhills Gara broke well and led until halfway before Hit The Lid took over the lead. Stouke Whisper remained prominent as the back three crowded each other. Curryhills Gara and Stouke Whisper touched at the third bend allowing Hit the Lid to run out the winner.

== See also ==
- 1988 UK & Ireland Greyhound Racing Year
