= 1998 English Greyhound Derby =

- Location: Wimbledon Stadium
- Start date: 26 May
- End date: 27 June
- Total prize money: £50,000 (winner)

The 1998 William Hill Greyhound Derby took place during May and June with the final being held on 27 June 1998 at Wimbledon Stadium. The winner Toms The Best received £50,000. The competition was sponsored by William Hill following the demise of the famous Sporting Life newspaper. Ante-post favourite Larkhill Jo was eliminated in the third round. The heats were held on 26, 29 & 30 May, the second round on 2, 5 & 6 June, third round on 13 June, quarter finals on 16 June and semi finals on 20 June.

== Final result ==
At Wimbledon (over 480 metres):

Position	Name of Greyhound	Breeding	Trap	SP	Time	Trainer
1st	Toms The Best	Frightful Flash - Ladys Guest	4	4-5f	28.75	Nick Savva (Milton Keynes)
2nd	Tuesdays Davy	Phantom Flash - Likely Wish	6	6-1	29.09	Patsy Byrne (Wimbledon)
3rd	Tullerboy Cash	Cry Dalcash - Tullerboy Kate	1	8-1	29.47	Brian Clemenson (Hove)
4th	Jaspers Boy	Castlelyons Gem - Polnoon Lane	5	9-4	29.48	David Pruhs (Peterborough)
5th	Honour and Glory	Murlens Slippy - Satharn Lady	2	7-1	29.56	John Coleman (Walthamstow)
N/R	Greenwood Flyer	I'm His - Pendle Witch				Patsy Byrne (Wimbledon)

=== Distances ===
4¼, 4¾, short head, 1 (lengths)
The distances between the greyhounds are in finishing order and shown in lengths. One length is equal to 0.08 of one second.

=== Race Report ===
Toms The Best added the English Derby crown to his 1997 Irish Greyhound Derby success becoming one of a very select group to have won both the English and Irish Derby. The race was won with relative ease by the hot favourite in a crowded race which featured only five greyhounds (the first time since 1970) after Greenwood Flyer was disqualified by the stewards in the semi-finals for fighting*.

== Semi finals ==
First Semi Final (Jun 20)
Pos	Name of Greyhound	Time
1st	Toms The Best	28.74
2nd	Tuesdays Davy	
3rd	Honour and Glory	
u	Gaytime Dean	
u	Josabb	
u	Niebieski Grom	

Second Semi Final (Jun 20)
Pos	Name of Greyhound	Time
1st	Greenwood Flyer	disq*
2nd	Tullerboy Cash	
3rd	Jaspers Boy	
u	Droopys Eric	
u	Droopys Conor	
u	brickfield Ace	

* Deliberate interference with other greyhounds in running.

== See also ==
- 1998 UK & Ireland Greyhound Racing Year
