= Thurles Greyhound Stadium =

Greyhound racing venue in County Tipperary, Ireland

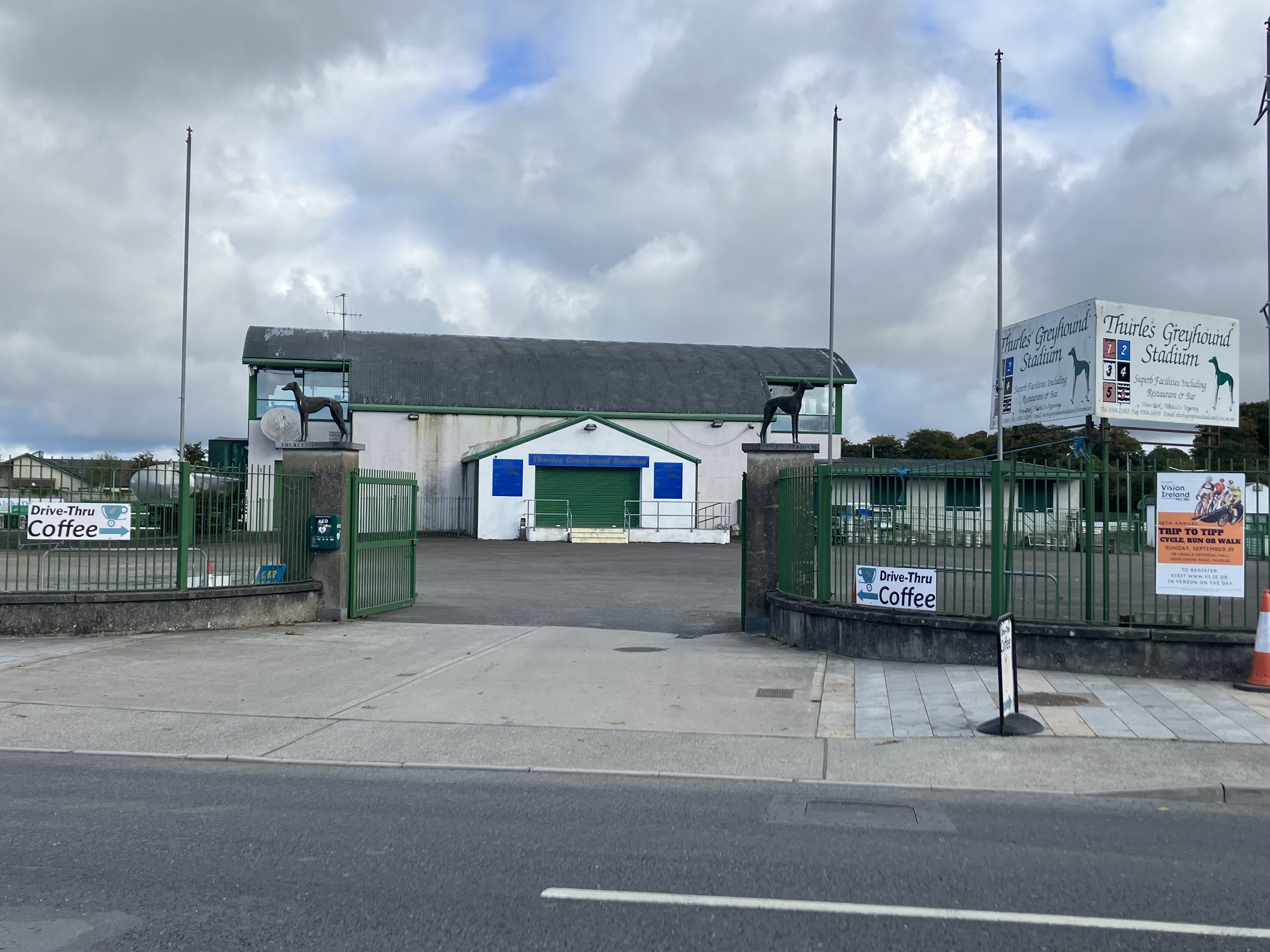
- Stadium entrance, September 2024
- Location: Castlemeadows (R498), Townparks, Thurles, County Tipperary, Ireland
- Coordinates: 52°41′03.6″N 7°49′21.0″W
- Operated by: Thurles Greyhound Racing & Sports Association
- Date opened: 1948
- Race type: greyhound racing

Thurles Greyhound Stadium is a greyhound racing track located on Castlemeadows opposite Semple Stadium in Thurles, County Tipperary, Ireland.

Racing takes place every Thursday and Saturday evening and the facilities include a trackside restaurant, fast food facilities, a number of bars and totalisator betting. Race distances are 330, 525, 570 and 600 yards.

The stadium has a car park which is also used for overflow parking for Semple Stadium and a farmers market on Saturday mornings.

== History ==
Just off the Castlemeadows in Thurles is the Townpark Greyhound Stadium which opened on 13 September 1948. Major events to have taken place over the years at the track and they are called the Tipperary Cup, Guinness 575, the Champion Bitch Stakes and Puppy Stakes. A very large circumference of 509 yards allows greyhounds a good gallop although the track is considered slow.

In 1962 the Grand National came to Townpark and would stay for 26 years until 1984 when it then moved to Shelbourne Park. The premier hurdle event in Ireland was won no less than three times by Special from 1972–1974.

The Thurles Greyhound Racing & Sports Association Limited continually ensured that the venue was kept in good order and it held many charity nights. The Racing Manager for many years was Eamonn Bourke before Paul Hayes took over the chair. In 2011 the stadium underwent significant refurbishment resulting in an extension to the main upstairs bar areas and facilities to cater for events.

== Competitions ==
current and former

- Tipperary Cup
- Grand National
- National Produce Stakes

== Track records ==
=== Current ===
Yards	Greyhound	Time (sec)	Date	Notes/ref
330	Astute Torpedo	17.47	15 July 2017	
360	Rambling Jack	19.01	29 July 2006	
525	Digital	28.11	16 July 2005	
550	Moyne Rebel	29.99	16 September 2000	
570	Donation	30.97	1 April 2017	
600	O'Learys Peggy	32.70	17 September 2005	
600	Roo Come On	=32.70	1 August 2009	
750	Killough Daisy	41.85	20 June 2008	
840	Debidee Lane	46.81	28 January 2006	
1035	Slaneyside Havoc	59.71	20 November 2010	
525 hurdles	Goofys Lofty	29.51	29 May 2004	

=== Former ===
Extended content

Yards	Greyhound	Time	Date	Notes
330	Move Handy	18.05	19 November 1966	
330	Top Customer	18.04	8 August 1976	
330	Lemon King	17.94	28 July 1990	
330	Quarter To Five	17.64	11 May 1999	
330	Pretty Smokey	17.64	27 May 2001	
330	Minnies Pavlova	17.54	25 July 2009	
360	Lisboney Grosvenor	20.20	8 August 1960	
360	Pretty Smokey	19.46	2 June 2001	
360	Cloughmartin Lad	19.29	21 September 2002	
360	Behind The Clock	19.10	30 September 2003	
360	Positive Option	19.08	27 November 2004	
525	Spanish Battleship	29.96	August 1954	Tipperary Cup second round
525	Spanish Battleship	29.85	21 August 1954	
525	Fearless Mac	=29.75	16 August 1960	Tipperary Cup 3rd round
525	Jerrys Clipper	29.45	26 August 1961	Tipperary Cup final
525	Flaming King	29.25	10 August 1968	
525	Sailing Weather	29.20	6 August 1983	
525	Moyne Rebel	28.86	9 April 2000	National Produce Stakes heats
525	Moyne Rebel	28.76	23 April 2000	National Produce Stakes semi finals
525	Moyne Rebel	28.70	30 April 2000	National Produce Stakes final
525	Smoking Ban	28.43	12 July 2003	
525	Charity Jack	28.28	9 July 2005	
550	Maltan Flame	30.85	31 August 1965	
550	Lissadell Ranger	30.62	25 July 1987	
550	Ardfert Sean	30.26	1988	
550	Mathews Gold	30.58	28 July 1990	
550	Coalbrook Tiger	30.44	27 July 1991	
550	Gunboat Jeff	30.42	1992	
550	Moyne Rebel	30.01	4 July 2000	
570	Ambleside Amy	31.40	21 September 2002	
570	Prince Ned	31.23	3 May 2003	
570	Born Flyer	31.14	4 November 2003	
570	Charity Jack	31.10	28 August 2004	
570	Ronans Delight	30.98	11 December 2004	
575	Ballybeg Pride	32.00	4 June 1968	
575	Ballybeg Maid	31.94	21 June 1975	
575	Gastrognome	31.76	16 June 1984	
575	Deenside Lion	31.73	24 May 1998	
600	July Sister	33.90	7 May 1960	
600	Cool Lad	33.90	11 June 1960	=equalled
600	Articifer	33.12	20 October 2001	
600	Silver Shout	32.71	1 February 2003	
700	Orwell Wonder	40.00	20 June 1964	
750	Getwhoyoulike	42.56	22 September 2001	
750	Lovely Rumble	42.10	7 December 2002	
750	O Learys Peggy	42.09	3 June 2006	
750	Olympic Show	41.88	2 February 2008	
840	Clanboy	48.16	30 August 1986	
840	Manx Sand	47.84	17 August 1991	
840	Bluetoon Solo	47.13	11 October 2003	
1035	Indian Hallie	60.75	2 February 2008	
1035	Forest Heidi	60.46	1 November 2008	
1035	Big Flop	59.88	13 November 2010	
330 H	Rambler Tonic	18.80	9 July 1960	
525 H	Olivers Leader	30.20	17 September 1966	
525 H	Special	29.75	15 September 1973	
525 H	Frightened Pig	29.58	20 December 2003	
