= Doncaster Greyhound Stadium =

Stadium in Doncaster, England

Doncaster Stadium
- The winning line at Doncaster Greyhound Stadium in 2018
- Interactive map of Doncaster Stadium
- Former names: Stainforth Stadium
- Location: Station Road, Stainforth
- Coordinates: 53°35′20.7″N 1°01′49.1″W

Construction
- Opened: 1929 Speedway; 1941 Greyhound Racing

Website
- Official website

Doncaster Greyhound Stadium is a greyhound racing track located in Stainforth, near Doncaster, England.

It is sometimes referred to as Meadow Court Stadium and was previously known as Stainforth Stadium. It is not to be confused with the former Doncaster Greyhound Track that existed near the York Road.

The stadium has executive suites, a restaurant, a number of bars and fast food areas. Racing takes place every Monday and Wednesday night, Saturday afternoon and Sunday morning.

== History ==
=== Pre-war history ===
Stainforth Stadium opened as a speedway dirt track in 1929 following extensive work on an area of marsh land west of Station Road that was turned from marsh to cinder. The track consisted of sand, three inches of concrete and then finished off with nine inches of cinder. The first speedway took place on Easter Monday 1930 but despite a promising start the Stainforth speedway company went into liquidation in 1930.

In 1933, the Stainforth Amateur Athletic Club bought the stadium but the World War II brought the Athletics to a halt. However, in 1941 during the war a greyhound and whippet track was added, the first meeting was on Saturday 22 March 1941 and plans were drawn up for racing every Saturday at 5.30 p.m. Races were held over 300 yards and 465 yards and the track attempted to gain permission for a tote in 1945 without success.

=== Post-war history ===
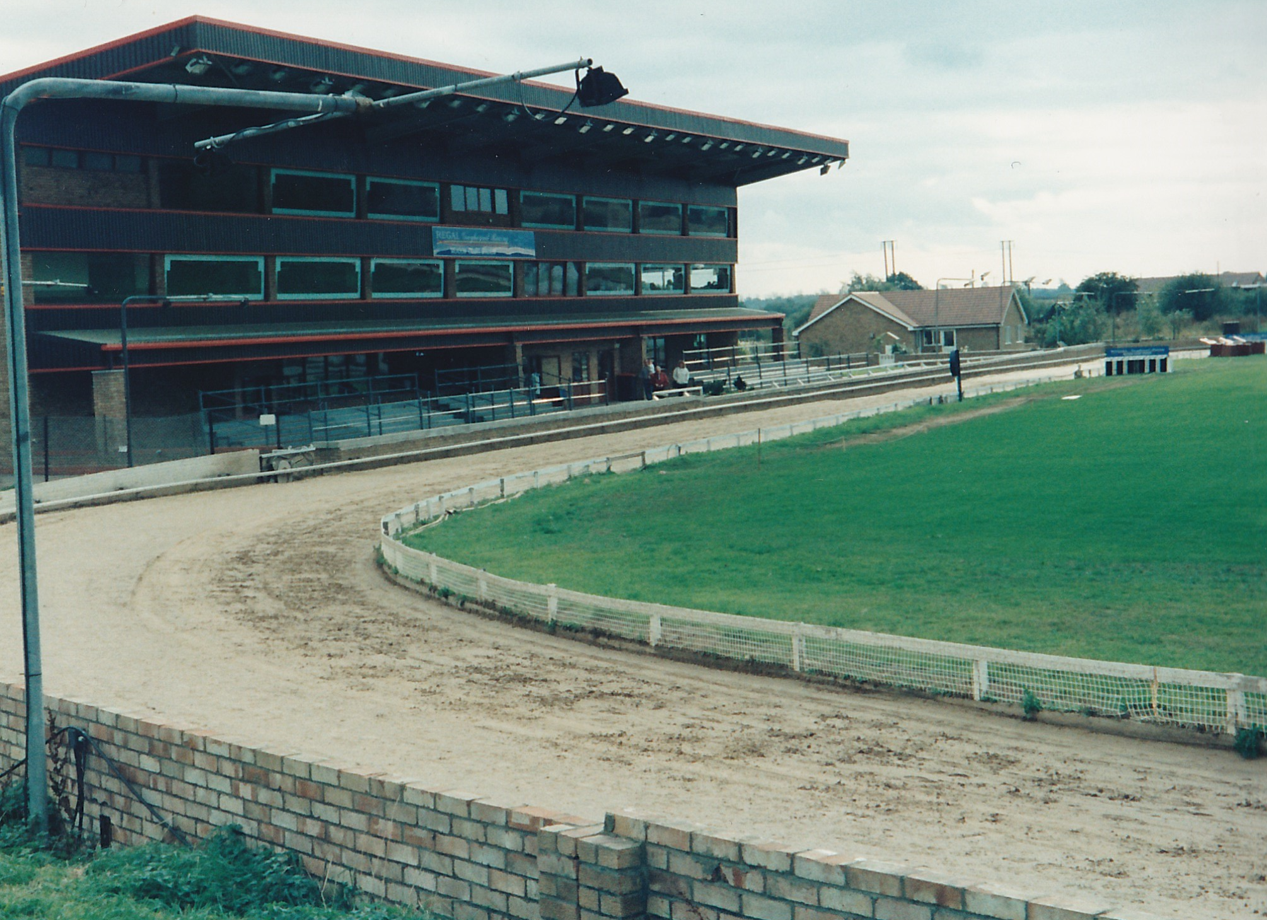
Stainforth Greyhound Stadium c.1993

The track remained a flapping track (not licensed by the National Greyhound Racing Club) for thirty five years; boxing events and trotting was also seen at the stadium that was owned by Benjamin Lovatt at the time. Distances changed to 350 and 600 yards and meetings took place on Tuesdays, Fridays and Saturdays. The stadium was reportedly sold in 1976 but plans to upgrade the track ended with the stadium closing in 1978 and the site remained derelict for a further thirteen years.

In 1992 businessman and greyhound enthusiast Chick Hicken and his partner June Hicken submitted plans for a new stadium to Doncaster council. The plans were passed during March 1993 a newly built track costing £1.5 million opened. The track wanted to become part of the National Greyhound Racing Club and brought in former English Greyhound Derby winning trainer Barbara Tompkins as General Manager; Racing Managers were Andrew Walker and Richard Bentley. A three tier grandstand was constructed with a restaurant, cocktail bar, public bar and other facilities all being available for the customers. Sometimes known as Meadow Court Stadium, the distances were over 275, 480, 661 and 709 metres on a track circumference of 430 metres. The opening also resulted in an exodus of trainers from Craven Park, Hull in order to train at Stainforth.

Tompkins retired in 2004 and the stadium re-branded from Stainforth Stadium to Doncaster Stadium in 2006. Former Belle Vue Stadium Racing Manager Stephen Gray and Richard Munton had spells as Racing Managers there from 2006-2008 and 2008-2010 respectively before former Wembley manager Mick Smith arrived. The track has grown in reputation and held the TV Trophy in 2008 & the Trainers Championship in 2010. The Yorkshire St Leger was inaugurated in 2004 and became the biggest event held at the track annually.

In 2018 the stadium signed a deal with SIS to race every Monday and Wednesday evening, Saturday afternoon and Sunday morning.

== Competitions ==
Yorkshire St Leger

== Track records ==
=== Current ===
| Metres | Greyhound | Time | Date | Notes |
|---|---|---|---|---|
| 275 | Pinpoint Mo | 16.51 | 31 July 2017 | |
| 450 | Droopys Country | 27.16 | 21 September 2016 | |
| 483 | King Eden | 28.87 | 28 August 2017 | |
| 661 | Frisby Figo | 41.00 | 1 September 2004 | |
| 661 | Black Pear | 41.00 | 4 September 2004 | =equalled |
| 868 | Flying Winner | 55.82 | 24 June 2008 | |
| 877 | Roxholme Magic | 55.69 | 30 September 2015 | |

=== Former ===
Extended content

| Metres | Greyhound | Time | Date | Notes |
|---|---|---|---|---|
| 278 | Slippery Jaydee | 16.44 | 1 December 1994 | |
| 278 | Fosse Way | 16.17 | 28 March 1999 | |
| 278 | Musical Chair | 16.84 | 30 October 2001 | |
| 278 | Glendon Jack | 16.63 | 16 November 2004 | |
| 450 | Pinpoint Dazl | 27.50 | 30 September 2015 | |
| 450 | Qatar Fortune | 27.42 | 27 July 2016 | |
| 450 | Coolavanny Rebel | 27.31 | 17 August 2016 | |
| 460 | Super Bridge | 27.46 | 2 July 1994 | |
| 480 | Silver Steel | 28.92 | 2002 | |
| 480 | Ravenshill Lad | 29.22 | 2 August 2003 | |
| 480 | Rhincrew Santini | 29.08 | 6 July 2004 | |
| 480 | Rhincrew Santini | 28.96 | 13 July 2004 | |
| 480 | Farloe Joe | 28.95 | 10 September 2004 | |
| 480 | Farloe Verdict | 28.94 | 13 July 2004 | |
| 483 | Farloe Joel | 29.55 | 27 March 2005 | |
| 483 | Cocks Hero | 29.52 | 3 April 2005 | |
| 483 | Distant Mist | 29.46 | 1 May 2005 | |
| 483 | Glen Abbey St | 29.39 | 1 May 2005 | |
| 483 | Jordans Spark | 29.25 | 1 May 2005 | |
| 483 | Yorkshire | 29.07 | 29 July 2005 | |
| 485 | Jubilee Rocco | 29.73 | 24 June 1993 | |
| 485 | Maireads Bob | 29.71 | 20 September 1998 | |
| 666 | Westwood Surprise | 40.95 | 10 September 1993 | |
| 705 | Gaba Gabba Hey | 44.40 | 17 November 2009 | |
| 709 | Almost On Fire | 43.86 | 28 June 1998 | |
| 709 | Soviet Valley | 44.66 | 11 March 2003 | |
| 709 | Gaynors Jet | 44.55 | 7 March 2004 | |
| 709 | Hesley Gale | 44.42 | 10 September 2004 | |
| 709 | Frisby Figo | 43.93 | 1 May 2004 | |
| 890 | Slow Fuse | 58.43 | 23 March 2001 | |
| 910 | Let Us Know | 58.43 | 3 March 2002 | |
| 910 | Ericas Equity | 58.08 | 10 September 2004 | |
| 925 | Souda Bay | 59.56 | 9 February 1998 | |
