= Rapid Ranger =

English racing greyhound

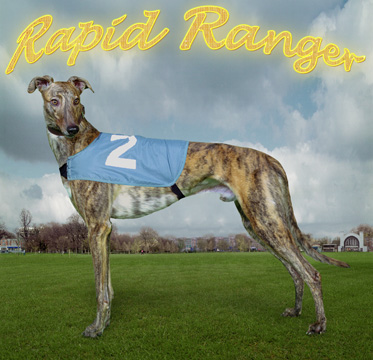
- Rapid Ranger, by photographer Gideon Hart
- Sire: Come On Ranger
- Dam: Rapid Vienna
- Sex: Dog
- Whelped: 11 January 1998
- Died: 30 September 2010 (aged 12)
- Color: Brindle
- Breeder: Martin Broughan
- Owner: Ray White
- Trainer: Charlie Lister OBE

Record
- 2 × winner of the English Greyhound Derby

Other awards
- 2001 Greyhound of the Year

Rapid Ranger (11 January 1998 – 30 September 2010) was a male brindle Greyhound. He is best known for becoming only the third dog to win the English Greyhound Derby on more than one occasion. He also qualified for the finals of both the Scottish and Irish Greyhound Derbys.

== Racing career ==
Ranger was defeated in his first two races as a puppy before winning a race whilst on the way to qualifying for the Puppy Classic final at the Nottingham Greyhound Stadium. Following a series of wins towards the end of 1999 he exchanged hands as Ray White after Ranger won at the Owlerton Stadium in Sheffield. White sent him to Charlie Lister, who became Ranger's new trainer.

His first race at Wimbledon Stadium came in January 2000 when the dog was invited to compete in the Juvenile Championship. He placed second behind Knockanroe Rover. Following a third-place finish in the Scottish Greyhound Derby, he returned to Wimbledon to take part in the English Greyhound Derby. He was defeated in the second round, but ultimately qualified for the final. He took the title from second-placed Rackethall Jet by three and a half lengths. White turned down the chance for Ranger to retire and go onto a stud career in an attempt to have the dog become the first Greyhound of his generation to win the Derby on more than one occasion.

He attempted to complete an English/Irish Derby where he met Rackethall Jet once more. But he was beaten into second place by Judicial Pride in the final. Following the Irish Derby, White decided to rest the dog for seven months. Rapid Ranger's return came at the Brighton & Hove Greyhound Stadium where he placed second to Droopys Vieri, who went on to knock Ranger out of the 2001 Scottish Derby in the second round.

He was re-entered in the English Derby but was beaten in the first round, and again in the quarters but qualified for the final. He found the final round of the Derby easier, as he beat the favorite, Sonic Flight, into second place. He led the race right from the start, with Sonic Flight never getting close. He raced from trap four, with pre-race odds of 7–4. The victory earned £50,000 for his owner, and made Rapid Ranger only the third Greyhound to win the Derby twice along with Mick the Miller and Patricias Hope.

Ranger was retired, but after a change of heart by his owner and trainer prior to the 2002 Derby, he was entered once more in an attempt to become the first dog to take the title on three occasions. He won in the first round, but his career ended for the final time when he was knocked out of the competition after two further rounds.

== Retirement and later life ==
A digitally composited artwork featuring Rapid Ranger was created by photographer Gideon Hart. The original hangs in the Crown and Sceptre public house in London W12.

After retirement, he moved to live with Lorraine Patient in 2007. This enabled White to visit him on a regular basis. He was taken to a breeder's show in Harlow during his later life to take part in a parade of champions, but became over-excited and suffered a minor stroke. After suffering a further stroke on 30 September 2010, he was euthanized. The decision was made after he was initially prescribed medication but was in distress after losing the use of his legs.

== Pedigree ==
Citizen Supreme
Greenpark Fox
Stern Satoo
Come On Ranger
Im Slippy
Mandies Handbag
Lindas Dance
Rapid Ranger
Sand Man
Lodge Prince
Cooga Customer
Rapid Vienna
Yellow Band
Vienna Girl
Springfield Lady
