= Charlie Lister =

British greyhound racing professional trainer

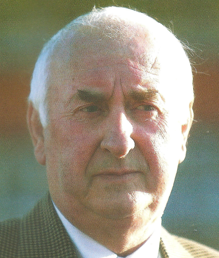
- Lister in 2003

Personal information
- Born: 1940 (age 85–86) Yorkshire, England
- Occupation: Greyhound trainer

Sport
- Sport: Greyhound racing

Achievements and titles
- National finals: Derby wins: English Derby (1997, 2000, 2001, 2003, 2010, 2011, 2013); Scottish Derby (1997, 2003, 2004, 2006, 2007, 2011, 2017); Classic/Feature wins: Cesarewitch (1993); Laurels (1999, 2004, 2005, 2006, 2014); St Leger (1996, 2006, 2013); Oaks (2011); Grand Prix (1995, 1996, 1998); Gold Collar (2005); Scurry Gold Cup (1999); Television Trophy (1996, 2000)

Charles Richard Lister OBE (born 1940) is a former English greyhound trainer. He is a four times winner of the Greyhound Trainer of the Year and is regarded as one of the leading trainers of all time. He also holds the record for English Greyhound Derby wins with seven.

== Early life ==
He was born in Yorkshire and used to attend coursing with his father. He then owned some greyhounds with a trainer called Joe Booth who ran on the independent circuit, known as flapping (unregulated racing).

== Career ==
After learning his trade on independent tracks he applied for a National Greyhound Racing Club C-licence. He was then gained a professional trainers licence and was awarded a contract at Leicester Stadium by Mick Wheble.

His first breakthroughs were with Swift Band, who won the 1981 East Anglian Derby and Glamour Hobo who finished runner up in the 1985 Scottish Greyhound Derby. The first Classic race success came in the 1993 Cesarewitch with Killenagh Dream at Belle Vue Stadium and a first Derby final appearance came one year later in the 1994 English Greyhound Derby. By 1996 Lister had become a leading trainer on the open race circuit and regularly won classic and major races.

Training out of kennels in Newark in Nottinghamshire, he steered Some Picture to victory in the final of the 1997 English Greyhound Derby and 1997 Scottish Derby. Lister became one of the most successful trainers in the sport after two more Derby wins with Rapid Ranger in the 2000 English Greyhound Derby and 2001 English Greyhound Derby.

Farloe Verdict won the 2003 English Greyhound Derby and in 2010 Bandicoot Tipoki won the 2010 English Greyhound Derby to equal the record held by Leslie Reynolds. The following year Taylors Sky was crowned champion and in the 2013 Sidaz Jack extended Lister's record to seven wins.

== Retirement ==
Lister retired in September 2018, handing the kennels and licence to head man Chris Akers.

== Awards ==
He has won the Greyhound Trainer of the Year four times, won the Trainers Championship six times. In 2011 he received an Order of the British Empire for services to Greyhound Racing.
