= John McGee (greyhound trainer) =

British and Irish greyhound racing professional trainer

John 'Ginger' McGee
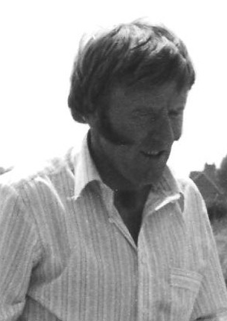

Personal information
- Born: County Tyrone
- Occupation: Greyhound trainer

Sport
- Sport: Greyhound racing

Achievements and titles
- National finals: Derby wins: English Derby (1988); Classic/Feature wins: Laurels (1993); Gold Collar (1988); Scurry Gold Cup (1990, 1994); Grand National (1991); Irish Cesarewitch (2013); Irish Oaks (2008); Irish Sprint Cup (2009); Easter Cup (1995)

John F. "Ginger" McGee is an Irish born greyhound trainer. He is a seven-time champion trainer of Great Britain and was regarded as the leading trainer during the early 1990s. He was seven-times UK Champion trainer and twice winner of the Trainers championship in 1982 and 1992.

== Career ==
After two decades on the flapping tracks, McGee first came to national attention as the head man to Fred Wiseman in 1987. He took over the Peaceful kennels in Ockendon Road, Upminster during 1988 and instantly gained success by winning the 1988 English Greyhound Derby with Hit the Lid in his maiden year. Gino also reached the same final for McGee. Sard won the 1988 Gold Collar and the year ended with McGee claiming the Greyhound Trainer of the Year title.

1989 proved to be another notable year as McGee became the Champion trainer for the second time and won the Trainers' Championship. He joined Hackney from Canterbury in 1990, replacing Doreen Boyce, and won a third consecutive Trainers' title. A fourth Trainers' title in 1991, with 209 winners, represented a new record, beating the three titles won by George Curtis and Phil Rees Sr.

In 1992, he joined Peterborough Greyhound Stadium and finished runner-up in the 1992 English Greyhound Derby with Winsor Abbey before he moved to Reading Stadium. In 1992, he secured his second Trainers Championship, winning four of the eight races that formed the event, he finished on 56 points, which was 22 points ahead of second placed Patsy Byrne on 34.

== Controversy ==
Despite extending his record to seven Trainers titles in 1994, controversy was to follow the remainder of McGee's career. The National Greyhound Racing Club (NGRC) revoked his Trainers' licence following a positive urine test for one of his greyhounds. McGee was unhappy at the severity of the punishment, and the two parties went to court. A high court judge overturned the NGRC suspension, but the NGRC then continued the court battle before McGee returned to Ireland to train, and would not be seen in NGRC racing again for four years.

In 1998, McGee returned to England after selling his Woodlands Kennels in County Kildare and leased the Halls Green Farm kennels at Roydon, Essex where former Walthamstow greyhounds were reared. After regaining his licence he was given an attachment at Rye House Stadium and returned to Reading in 1998. In 2001, he opposed the decision by the Professional Greyhound Trainers' Association (PGTA) to allow John Mullins to replace his mother Linda Mullins, in the Trainers' Championship, following her retirement. McGee's had been denied an invitation to run in 1988 when he took over the kennels from Fred Wiseman under the same scenario.

The controversy surrounding McGee continued when in 2001 he had a second positive urine sample. His licence was withdrawn, and he was told that no further applications would be considered until January 2003. Ireland's governing body the Bord na gCon under chairman, Paschal Taggart, circulated a letter to the Department of Arts, Tourism and Sports, underlining that the authority did not approve of McGee training in Ireland. McGee then applied to the Clonmel based Irish Coursing Club, which approved his licence. His daughter Keeley took over the kennel, and then they returned to Ireland, eventually taking kennels in County Meath.

== Post 2009 ==
He had his seven-year ban from entering runners at British greyhound tracks lifted by the Greyhound Board of Great Britain in 2009. In later years he reached the 2009 Irish Greyhound Derby final and the 2010 English Greyhound Derby final and won the 2013 Irish Cesarewitch. He is now based in Kildare.

== Awards ==
He won the Greyhound Trainer of the Year seven times (1988, 1989, 1990, 1991, 1992, 1993 and 1994), a record that stood until 2016 when surpassed by Mark Wallis and won the Trainers' Championship twice in 1989 and 1992.
