= 2016 Irish Greyhound Derby =

- Location: Shelbourne Park
- Start date: 11 August
- End date: 17 September
- Total prize money: €240,000

The 2016 Boylesports Irish Greyhound Derby started on 11 August and culminated with the final held on 17 September at Shelbourne Park.

The prize money on offer was €240,000 of which €125,000 went to the winner Rural Hawaii. The competition was sponsored by Boylesports.

Produce Stakes & Champion Stakes winner Clares Rocket headed the ante-post lists at a very short 5–1. Other leading contenders included the defending champion Ballymac Matt, Kirby Memorial Stakes & Dundalk International champion Droopys Roddick and the 2016 English Greyhound Derby winner Jaytee Jet.

== Final result ==
At Shelbourne Park (over 550 yards):

| Position | Name of Greyhound | Breeding | Trap | Sectional | SP | Finish Time | Trainer |
|---|---|---|---|---|---|---|---|
| 1st | Rural Hawaii | Head Bound - Duck Fat | 6 | 3.40 | 4-1 | 29.65 | Graham Holland |
| 2nd | Holycross Leah | Shaneboy Lee - Good Sarah | 1 | 3.46 | 7-1 | 29.72 | James Melia |
| 3rd | Sonic | Knockglass Billy - Vickis Dream | 4 | 3.51 | 1-1f | 29.79 | Graham Holland |
| 4th | Escapism | Paradise Madison - Killacolla Glory | 5 | 3.60 | 8-1 | 29.93 | Owen McKenna |
| 5th | Ballymac Matt | Tyrur Big Mike - Ballymac Scarlet | 3 | 3.50 | 10-1 | 30.10 | Liam Dowling |
| 6th | Sidarian Pearl | Vans Escalade - Rockburst Pearl | 2 | 3.43 | 9-2 | 30.11 | Graham Holland |

=== Distances ===
1, 1, 2, 2½, short-head (lengths)

== Competition race report ==
The first round consisted of 21 heats and the fastest heat winner was the 2015 Irish Oaks champion Ballydoyle Honey who recorded 29.49. Before the second round there was a major shock with the withdrawals of ante-post favourite Clares Rocket and the English Derby champion Jaytee Jet; both had picked up minor injuries in the first round.

During the second round Laughil Duke set the fastest time of 29.43 but leading contenders Droopys Roddick, Ballydoyle Honey, Peregrine Falcon and track record holder Tyrur Van Gaal all failed to progress.

The elimination of favourites continued in round three as Laughil Duke and Farloe Joey both went out. Defending champion Ballymac Matt finished second in his heat to make the quarter-final stage and Sonic provided the fastest heat win in 29.36. Only Lenson Rocky and Rural Hawaii remained unbeaten.

Sonic beat Ballymac Matt and Rural Hawaii in a very strong quarter-final and Sidarian Pearl recorded 29.71 to register the fastest winning heat. Roxholme Barkley and Gyp Rosetti completed the heat wins but Lenson Rocky failed to make the semi-finals.

In the semi-finals Sonic justified short odds after defeating Escapism in 29.40 with defending champion Ballymac Matt taking third place to qualify for the final and set up an attempt to secure a second successive title. The second semi-final went the way of Rural Hawaii who won from Holycross Leah and Sidarian Pearl which resulted in three Graham Holland trained runners in the final.

Rural Hawaii became the 2016 champion after leading from the traps. Holycross Leah ran on for second with favourite Sonic taking third place.

== Quarter finals ==
Heat 1 (Sep 3)
| Pos | Name | SP | Time |
|---|---|---|---|
| 1st | Roxholme Barkley | 4-1 | 30.01 |
| 2nd | College Paradise | 12-1 | 30.22 |
| 3rd | Patricks Castle | 9-2 | 30.43 |
| 4th | Droopys Tee | 7-1 | 30.60 |
| 5th | Urban Gossip | 4-1 | 30.74 |
| 6th | Highview Event | 5-4f | 00.00 |

Heat 2 (Sep 3)
| Pos | Name | SP | Time |
|---|---|---|---|
| 1st | Sonic | 4-5f | 29.91 |
| 2nd | Ballymac Matt | 2-1 | 30.08 |
| 3rd | Rural Hawaii | 9-2 | 30.09 |
| 4th | Jo Jo Fantasy | 7-1 | 30.16 |
| 5th | Vivaro Swift | 16-1 | 30.37 |
| N/R | Skywalker Rory | | |

Heat 3 (Sep 3)
| Pos | Name | SP | Time |
|---|---|---|---|
| 1st | Sidarian Pearl | 5-4f | 29.71 |
| 2nd | Holycross Leah | 3-1 | 29.75 |
| 3rd | Ela Alecko | 10-1 | 30.44 |
| 4th | Aghaburren Lola | 12-1 | 30.48 |
| 5th | Slippery Louise | 5-1 | 30.55 |
| 6th | Doctor Zhivago | 5-1 | 29.37 |

Heat 4 (Sep 3)
| Pos | Name | SP | Time |
|---|---|---|---|
| 1st | Tynwald Gap | 5-1 | 29.73 |
| 2nd | Farloe Rumble | 7-1 | 29.97 |
| 3rd | Escapism | 3-1 | 30.11 |
| 4th | Lenson Rocky | 1-1f | 30.12 |
| 5th | Combo Sidney | 8-1 | 30.13 |
| 6th | Droopys Ford | 8-1 | 30.34 |

== Semi finals ==
First Semi-final (Sep 10)
| Pos | Name of Greyhound | SP | Time |
|---|---|---|---|
| 1st | Sonic | 1-1f | 29.40 |
| 2nd | Escapism | 3-1 | 29.61 |
| 3rd | Ballymac Matt | 6-1 | 29.75 |
| 4th | Ela Alecko | 10-1 | 29.92 |
| 5th | Patricks Castle | 8-1 | 29.93 |
| 6th | Farloe Rumble | 6-1 | 30.00 |

Second Semi-final (Sep 10)
| Pos | Name of Greyhound | SP | Time |
|---|---|---|---|
| 1st | Rural Hawaii | 5-2jf | 29.58 |
| 2nd | Holycross Leah | 5-2jf | 29.75 |
| 3rd | Sidarian Pearl | 3-1 | 30.03 |
| 4th | College Paradise | 10-1 | 30.17 |
| 5th | Roxholme Barkley | 4-1 | 30.49 |
| 6th | Tynwald Gyp | 4-1 | 30.73 |

== See also ==
- 2016 UK & Ireland Greyhound Racing Year
