= Select Stakes (Irish greyhound race) =

Irish greyhound racing competition

- Class: Feature
- Location: Kilcohan Park
- Inaugurated: 1965
- Sponsor: Droopys Stud

Race information
- Distance: 525 yards
- Surface: Sand
- Purse: €10,000 (winner)

The Select Stakes is a greyhound racing competition held annually at Kilcohan Park Greyhound Stadium located in the south of Waterford, Ireland. Ireland.

It is a prestigious event targeted by many of Ireland's leading greyhounds and is an integral part of the Irish greyhound racing calendar. The competition today is sponsored by Gain Feeds but in the past sponsors have included Waterford Glass and Red Mills.

== Past winners ==
Year	Winner	Breeding	Time (sec)	Trainer	SP	Notes/ref
1965	Ballyowen Chief	Oregon Prince – Earnest Lady	30.00	Gay McKenna	7/4f	
1970	Kevinsfort Star		30.40			
1971	Star Mise		30.10			
1972	Dark Treasure	Clomoney Jet – Foresight Lass	29.85	Ann Heffernan		
1973	Speck of Luck		30.30			
1974	Tory Snowball	Toms Pal – Melville Money	30.18			
1975	Peruvian Style	Kilbelin Style – Russian Boots	29.34			
1976	Melody Shine		29.60			
1977	Bins Bridge		29.38	Matt O'Donnell		
1978	Gala Display	Mortor Light – Gala Duchess	29.76			
1979	Off Stage	Sage – Ah Go Off	29.74			
1980	Off Stage	Sage – Ah Go Off	29.82			
1981	Miss Hilary	Sand Man –Maythorn Pride	30.02			
1982	Mountleader Max	Blackers Height – Mountleader Cleo	29.76			
1983	Spartacus	Knockrour Slave – I'm A Star	29.76	Matt O'Donnell		
1984	Coolmona Man	Killaclug Jet – Knockrour Minnie	29.84			
1985	Oran Flash	Oran Jack – Warm Wind	29.70			
1986	Odell Supreme	Citizen Supreme – Odell Tansy	29.54			
1987	Top Up	Limerick Echo – Drawn Near	29.78			
1988	Castlelyons Gem	Im Slippy – Just Cruisin	29.90			
1990	Smart Stone					
1991	Slippys Quest	Im Slippy – Pretty Special	29.36			
1994	Greenane Gigolo	Lodge Prince - Borris Chat	29.50			
1996	Batties Rocket	Batties Whisper – Lady Arrancourt		Matt O'Donnell		
1998	Sineads Rocket	Fifthofnovember – Lady Arrancourt	28.67	Frances O'Donnell	4/7f	
1999	Mr Bozz	Cry Dalcash – Terrys Whisper	28.57	Paul Hennessy	5/2	
2000	Droopys Vieri	Top Honcho –Droopys Fergie	28.86	Paul Young - England	9/10f	
2001	Sonic Flight	Frightful Flash – Westmead Flight	28.28	Dolores Ruth	2/1	
2002	Rummy Lad	Come On Ranger – Redwood Sarah	28.33	Dolores Ruth	11/2	
2003	World Class	Come On Ranger – Queen Survivor	29.26	Pat Buckley	9/1	
2004	Valentia Citrate	Larkhill Jo – Ullid Citrate	29.74	Frances O'Donnell	10-1	
2005	Digital	Larkhill Jo –Frosty Rose	29.60	Michael O'Donovan	5/1	
2006	Si Senor	Droopys Kewell – Droopys Beauty	30.26	Owen McKenna	9/4	
2007	Catunda Harry	Elite State – Your So Vain	29.40	Owen McKenna	1/1f	
2008	Slip The Lark	Larkhill Jo – Slip The Posse	29.70	Pat Buckley	7/4	
2009	Broadacres Turbo	Top Honcho – Riverside Bella	29.63	Graham Holland	6/1	
2010	Krug Ninety Five	Droopys Maldini – Frontier Music	29.52	Fraser Black	8/1	dead-heat
2010	Tyrur Enda	Razldazl Billy – Regards To Alice	29.52	Conor Fahy	4/5f	dead-heat
2011	Piercestown Sand	Ace Hi Rumble – Tyford Blackie	29.69	Shanks Whelan	9/4	
2012	Milldean Tally	Head Bound – Talita Beauty	28.67	Dolores Ruth	3/1	
2013	Vanrooney	Ace Hi Rumble – Lady Deise	28.47	Owen McKenna	4/1	
2014	Southest Suzie	Hondo Black – Droopys Brid	28.75	Daniel Frayne	6/1	
2015	Hee Haws Sheriff	Tyrur Big Mike – Come On Caoimhe	28.73	Ian Reilly	7/4f	
2016	Riverside Oscar	Knockglass Billy – Forrachmore	28.42	Graham Holland	5/2	
2017	Lughill Robbie	Superior Product – Lughill Sonya	28.56	Graham Holland	3/1	
2018	Cabra Hurricane	Kinloch Brae – Cabra Ebony	28.29	Patrick Guilfoyle	4/6f	
2019	Blue East	Droopys Jet – Lemon Bolt	28.44	Graham Holland	7/2	
2020	cancelled due to COVID-19					
2021	Skywalker Barry	Droopys Jet – Calzaghe Jan	28.14	Mark O'Donovan	No SP	No SP due to COVID-19
2022	Explosive Boy	Good News – Delightful Girl	28.20	Patrick Guilfoyle	13/8f	
2023	Clona Duke	Malachi – Coolavanny Pearl	28.22	Graham Holland	9/4jf	
2024	Droopys Fidget	Out of Range ASB – Droopys Natalia	28.41	Robert G. Gleeson	7/4f	
2025	Seven Beach	Pestana – Whitings Gift	28.64	Jennifer O'Donnell	1/2f	

== Venues & Distances ==
- 1970–2003 (Waterford 525y)
- 2004–2011 (Waterford 550y)
- 2012–2025 (Waterford 525y)

== Sponsors and names ==
- 1965–1965 (Waterford Glass International)
- 1970–1975 (Marquis of Waterford Cup)
- 1976–1978 (Truboard Gold Cup)
- 1979–1997 (Waterford Glass Stakes/Waterford Crystal Stakes)
- 1998–1998 (Waterford Masters)
- 1999–2000 (Kearns Waterford Masters)
- 2002–2003 (Westside Business Park Waterford Masters)
- 2004–2005 (Michael Meade Waterford Masters)
- 2006–2008 (Gain Waterford Masters)
- 2009–2011 (Red Mills Waterford Masters)
- 2012–2019 (Gain Select Stakes)
- 2023–2024 (TIME Greyhound Nutrition)
- 2025–2025 (Droopys Stud)
