= 2020 Irish Greyhound Derby =

2020 edition of the Irish Greyhound Derby competition

2020 Boylesports Irish Greyhound Derby
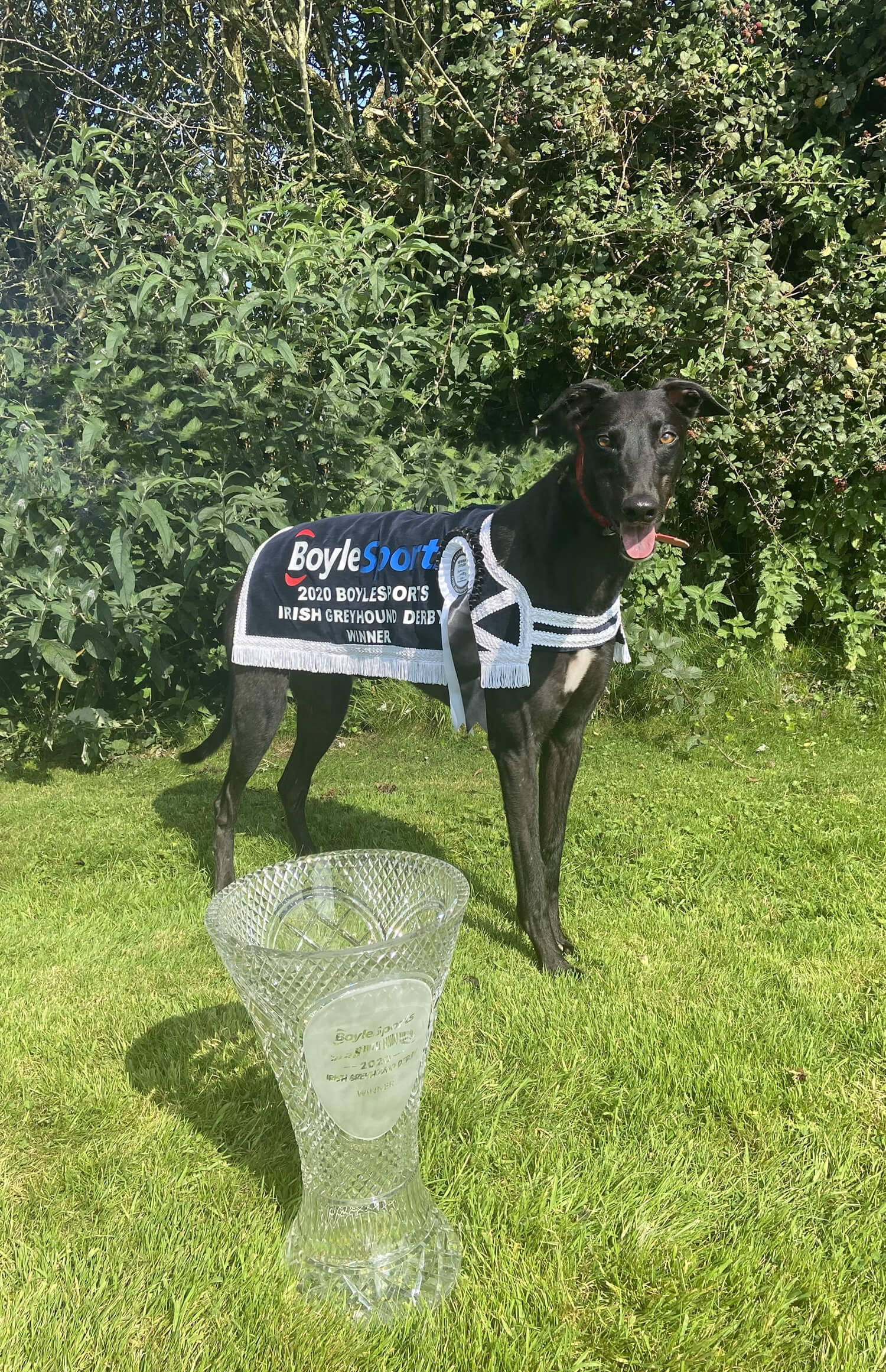
- Newinn Taylor
- Location: Shelbourne Park
- Start date: Friday 14 August
- End date: Saturday 19 September
- Competitors: 144
- Total prize money: €255,460 (winner €115,000)

The 2020 Boylesports Irish Greyhound Derby took place during August and September, with the final being held on 19 September at Shelbourne Park. The competition was sponsored by BoyleSports and the prize money purse was €255,460, of which €115,000 went to the winner.

The winner was Newinn Taylor, a May 2018 whelp trained by Graham Holland. Owned by Simon Taylor and bred by Jim O'Donnell the black dog recorded his 16th victory from 18 starts in the final.

The defending champion Lenson Bocko, winner of the 2019 Irish Greyhound Derby and Ballymac Inspeed were the early ante-post favourites at 8–1. These were followed by Produce Champion Newinn Taylor, Glengar Bale, Da Bold Eagle and Black Parachute. For the second year running there were no entries from England but this year it was due to the COVID-19 pandemic. Other major entries included 2019 English Greyhound Derby champion Priceless Blake, Easter Cup champion Wolfe, Corn Cuchulainn winner Ballymac Kingdom, Champion Stakes winner Pestana, Gold Cup & Leger champion Ballymac Anton, Ballymac Cooper, Lenson Blinder and Skywalker Logan.

== Final result ==
At Shelbourne Park (over 550 yards):

Position	Greyhound	Breeding	Trap	Sectional	SP	Time	Trainer
1st	Newinn Taylor	Droopys Buick - Newinn Expert	6	3.41	13-8	29.61	Graham Holland
2nd	Meenagh Miracle	Farloe Rumble - Rios Girl	2	3.65	25-1	29.64	Michael Corr
3rd	Ballymac Cooper	Ballymac Matt - Ballymac Scala	5	3.42	6-1	29.78	Liam Dowling
4th	Kilara Icon	Droopys Jet - Kilara Lizzie	3	3.57	25-1	29.80	Robert G Gleeson
5th	Ballymac Wild	Vulturi - Ballymac Breeze	1	3.43	9-2	30.40	Liam Dowling
6th	Pestana	Ballymac Best - Coolavanny Pet	4	3.43	11-8f	00.00	Owen McKenna

=== Distances ===
½, 2, neck, 8½, DNF (0.07 sec = one length)

== Quarter finals ==
Heat 1 (Sep 5)
Pos	Name	SP	Time
1st	Ballymac Wild	8-11f	29.07
2nd	Meenagh Miracle	10-1	29.35
3rd	Catchmeflying	5-1	29.37
4th	Great Name That	6-1	29.47
5th	Ropewalk Bhoy	16-1	29.54
6th	Clona Blaze	7-2	29.68

Heat 2 (Sep 5)
Pos	Name	SP	Time
1st	Kilara Icon	8-1	29.58
2nd	Glengar Bale	4-5f	29.59
3rd	Toolmaker Sydney	6-1	29.62
4th	Mustang Firmino	7-1	29.69
5th	Frankies Jet	20-1	29.70
6th	Newinn Sheedy	11-4	29.77

Heat 3 (Sep 5)
Pos	Name	SP	Time
1st	Pestana	1-2f	29.07
2nd	Ballmac Cooper	7-4	29.21
3rd	Scooby Princess	16-1	29.49
4th	Da Bold Eagle	33-1	29.50
5th	Deerjet Sydney	10-1	29.57
N/R	Waikiki Keano		

Heat 4 (Sep 5)
Pos	Name	SP	Time
1st	Newinn Taylor	1-2f	29.19
2nd	Boylesports Xtra	5-2	29.40
3rd	Indesatchel	8-1	29.41
4th	Razldazl Annie	28-1	29.62
5th	Razldazl Peaky	12-1	29.69
6th	Newinn Lester	14-1	29.79

== Semi finals ==
First Semi Final (Sep 12)
Pos	Name of Greyhound	SP	Time	Trainer
1st	Newinn Taylor	8-13f	29.13	Graham Holland
2nd	Ballymac Cooper	4-1	29.27	Liam Dowling
3rd	Meenagh Miracle	16-1	29.37	Michael Corr
4th	Toolmaker Sydney	5-1	29.51	Robert Gleeson
5th	Scooby Princess	16-1	29.58	Jennifer O'Donnell
6th	Catchmeflying	10-1	29.76	Thomas Buggy

Second Semi Final (Sep 12)
Pos	Name of Greyhound	SP	Time	Trainer
1st	Pestana	4-11f	29.39	Owen McKenna
2nd	Ballymac Wild	4-1	29.53	Liam Dowling
3rd	Kilara Icon	12-1	29.70	Robert Gleeson
4th	Glengar Bale	8-1	29.76	Pat Buckley
5th	Indesatchel	20-1	29.83	Graham Holland
N/R	Boylesports Xtra			Paul Hennesey

== Competition report ==
Before the first round got underway there was a disappointing withdrawal when English Derby champion Priceless Blake was declared a non runner and Ballymac Inspeed was sold to England. With 96 greyhounds qualifying for the second round only the fifth and sixth-placed greyhounds would be eliminated but Lenson Blinder, Doolin Duke and Black Parachute were notable names that fell into that category. The fastest honour went to the in-form Pestana in a time of 29.21 sec, on 14 August and defending champion Lenson Bocko and Produce champion Newinn Taylor (previously unbeaten) both progressed despite third-place finishes.

The second round produced some intriguing results and highlighted the claims of several previously unmentioned greyhounds. Epic Hero set a great time of 29.19 in sealing heat 8, a time only bettered by one of the ante post favourites Glengar Bale who impressed with a 29.15 heat win. Newinn Sheedy and Catunda Logan also looked in great shape with fast wins. Ballymac Kingdom and Redzer Ardfert were both eliminated. The second set of second round heats on 22 August, contained most of the big names and started with a sensational track record win from the Derby favourite Pestana. The blue brindle became the first greyhound in the history of Shelbourne Park to break 29 seconds over 550 yards with a 28.99 run beating Newinn Taylor by 3½ lengths. Two big names safely through became four after Ballymac Anton defeated Wolfe in the next heat and this was followed by a double Ballymac success when Ballymac Wild and Ballymac Cooper both blitzed round in 29.15 and 29.10 respectively. The night finished with a win for Boylesports Xtra and a second place for Lenson Bocko behind Feudal Spirit.

The third round was run on the 29 August and the big shock of the night was the elimination of defending champion Lenson Bocko after he was involved in a troubled race. The champion's campaign never really got of the ground with 3rd, 2nd and 4th-place finishes. Newinn Taylor continued to improve over the distance and went fastest in 29.11 even beating the heat win by Pestana (29.15). The pair were now clear of all others in the betting market. Other surprise eliminations included Wolfe, Ballymac Anton and Epic Hero in a heat that resembled a final and Catunda Logan. The best of the rest was Ballymac Wild (29.31).

The quarter finals started with one of the weaker heats but ended with another win for Ballymac Wild, the blue brindle dog posted a fast 29.07 to remain unbeaten and now looked like a serious contender. Heat 2 went to outsider Kilara Icon from favourite Glengar Bale with Newinn Sheedy eliminated. Pestana impressed again, also recording 29.07 and beating Balymac Cooper. The final and strongest heat went to the other big favourite Newinn Taylor from Boylesports Xtra in 29.19.

The semi finals now contained three clear favourites in Pestana, Newinn Taylor and Ballymac Wild. The first ended in the expected order with Newinn Taylor impressing again in 29.12 from Ballymac Cooper. Meenagh Miracle took the remaining qualifying berth for the final despite failing to win any heat throughout the competition. In the second semi final Pestana won again to reach the final unbeaten with Ballymac Wild running up, Kilara Icon finished third to take the last Derby final place.

The final line up was extremely strong with the unbeaten Pestana leading the betting from Newinn Taylor, they were followed by the Ballymac pair of Wild and Cooper both serious contenders. The two outsiders Meenala Miracle and Kilara Icon would need a huge slice of luck to take the crown. Being a final with so much quality the early pace was going to be vital and as expected the four favoured greyhounds all broke well but unfortunately they all broke together with all four sectional placings being within two spots of each other as they headed for the first bend. Newinn Taylor was just ahead at the bend with Ballymac Cooper right next to him, Pestana squeezed Ballymac Wild on the rail which caused a chain reaction of trouble as Ballymac Wild was forced to check badly and Pestana was knocked over, Ballymac Cooper was hampered and even Newinn Taylor was slightly impeded but left clear on his own. Meenala Miracle swept round the bend missing the trouble and Kilara Icon swerved to miss the trouble. Newinn Taylor showed good back pace with Ballymac Cooper in second place being drawn in by Meenagh Miracle. At the third bend Meenagh Miracle overtook Ballymac Cooper and began to make ground on the leader but Newinn Taylor held on well to secure victory by a half a length. Ballymac Wild trailed in a distant fifth and Pestana suffered a broken leg which partly ruined the night. Early indications were that he would recover from the injury.

== See also ==
- 2020 UK & Ireland Greyhound Racing Year
