= 2024 UK & Ireland Greyhound Racing Year =

99th year of UK and Irish greyhound racing

2024 UK & Ireland Greyhound Racing Year was the 99th year of greyhound racing in the United Kingdom and the 98th year of greyhound racing in Ireland.

== Summary ==
The Trainers' Judgement Night held at Hove on 4 May, was won by Liz McNair for the first time. The Irish won another English Greyhound Derby when De Lahdedah won for trainer Liam Dowling, equalling the track record in the process. It was the third consecutive win for the Irish and the fifth winner from the last six editions.

The sport's leading sire Droopys Sydney died on 18 August 2024. The black dog sired over 5,000 offspring, including two English Derby winners in Deerjet Sydney and Gaytime Nemo. He was the Irish stud dog of the year for three years running.

On 30 July 2024, Suffolk Downs suffered a fire which caused significant damage to several areas. The stadium remained closed for the remainder of the year.

The Irish Greyhound Derby was moved from its traditional Summer slot due to a major refurbishment of Shelbourne Park. Bockos Diamond lit up the competition breaking and equalling the track record in two rounds of the competition on his way to an unbeaten success. Six flawless runs saw the Graham Holland trained black dog become the shortest winner of a final in the event's history and extend his race record to a 15th consecutive win in just his 16th race.

In November 2024, Entain made a shock announcement about their intention to close Crayford Stadium after the Christmas period, stating that "it is no longer viable for us to continue operating the site".

== Roll of honour ==
Major Winners
Award	Name of Winner
2024 English Greyhound Derby	De Lahdedah
2024 Irish Greyhound Derby	Bockos Diamond
British Greyhound Trainer of the Year	Mark Wallis
British Greyhound of the Year	Wicky Ned

=== Principal British finals ===
Premier Greyhound Racing Golden Jacket, Crayford (24 Feb, 714m, £20,000)
Pos	Name of Greyhound	Trap	SP	Time	Trainer
1st	Dazl Rolex	5	5/1	45.03	Ricky Holloway
2nd	Havana Top Note	4	5/1	45.11	Liz McNair
3rd	Ballymac Taylor	2	9/4	45.27	Mark Wallis
4th	Coonough Crow	1	2/1f	45.31	Mark Wallis
5th	Havana Lover	6	6/1	45.67	Liz McNair
6th	Tuono Bella	7	10/1	46.07	Paul Donovan

Stadium Bookmakers TV Trophy, Oxford (23 March, 847m, £15,000)
Pos	Name of Greyhound	Trap	SP	Time	Trainer
1st	Bubbly Inferno	4	16/1	52.37 (TR)	Paul Young
2nd	Ballymac Taylor	2	4/5f	52.51	Mark Wallis
3rd	Garfiney Blaze	3	10/3	52.62	Mark Wallis
4th	Savana Jazz	5	4/1	52.68	Diane Henry
5th	Aayamza Dancer	1	12/1	52.77	John Mullins
6th	Alright Patricia	6	16/1	52.97	David Lewis

PGR Trainers' Judgement Night, Hove (4 May)
Pos	Trainer	Track	Pts
1st	Liz McNair	Central Park Stadium	56
2nd	John Mullins	Towcester Stadium	40
3rd	Mark Wallis	Suffolk Downs	35
4th	Richard Rees	Brighton & Hove	31
5th	Kevin Hutton	Oxford Stadium	22
6th	Tom Heilbron	Newcastle Stadium	20

Arena Racing Company Laurels, Perry Barr (27 Apr, 480m, £12,500)
Pos	Name of Greyhound	Trap	SP	Time	Trainer
1st	Kilwest Ranger	6	9/2	28.38	Paul Harmes
2nd	Jet Stream Angel	3	2/1f	28.58	Kevin Hutton
3rd	Brickwork Ruck	5	14/1	28.66	Phil Barlow
4th	Acomb Felix	1	10/3	28.74	Kevin Ferguson
5th	Acomb Irene	4	7/2	28.98	Kevin Ferguson
6th	Wicky Hiker	2	9/2	00.00	Phil Barlow

Premier Greyhound Racing Regency, Brighton (27 Jul, 695m, £20,000)
Pos	Name of Greyhound	Trap	SP	Time	Trainer
1st	Baywatch Bullet	2	7/1	41.51	Belinda Green
2nd	Bubbly Scorcher	1	7/2	41.69	Paul Young
3rd	Haka Carlo	4	5/1	41.79	Jason Heath
4th	Lightfoot Falcon	5	20/1	41.81	Seamus Cahill
5th	Ballymac Taylor	3	4/1	41.83	Mark Wallis
6th	Cooladerry Dust	6	6/5f	41.92	Nathan Hunt

Premier Greyhound Racing St Leger, Perry Barr (28 Sep, 710m, £20,000)
Pos	Name of Greyhound	Trap	SP	Time	Trainer
1st	Droopys Clue	1	2/5f	42.97	Seamus Cahill
2nd	Clona Curly	4	8/1	43.03	Diane Henry
3rd	Coonough Crow	2	6/1	43.05	Mark Wallis
4th	Trickycinderella	5	18/1	43.09	Robert Holt
5th	Hurry Up Jordan	6	9/1	43.17	John Lambe
6th	Tuono Bella	3	10/1	43.25	Paul Donovan

Premier Greyhound Racing Oaks, Perry Barr (26 Oct, 480m, £20,000)
Pos	Name of Greyhound	Trap	SP	Time	Trainer
1st	Druids Say Go	2	4/11f	27.82	Patrick Janssens
2nd	Icemans Girl	3	4/1	28.24	Nathan Hunt
3rd	Coppice Ella	6	10/1	28.30	Kevin Hutton
4th	Front Alice	5	22/1	28.44	Kevin Proctor
5th	Chamberlain Kate	1	25/1	28.48	Carol Weatherall
6th	Droopys Eunice	4	9/1	28.54	Maxine Locke

=== Principal Irish finals ===
Bresbet Easter Cup, Shelbourne (6 Apr, 550y, €25,000)
Pos	Name of Greyhound	Trap	SP	Time	Trainer
1st	Clonbrien Treaty	6	4/1	29.77	Graham Holland
2nd	Clona Duke	2	7/4f	29.91	Graham Holland
3rd	Droopys Fidget	1	6/1	29.98	Robert G. Gleeson
4th	Boylesports Bob	4	8/1	30.15	Paul Hennessy
5th	Undulation	3	3/1	30.22	Brendan Matthews
6th	Glengar Martha	5	5/1	30.50	Pat Buckley

Con & Annie Kirby Memorial, Limerick (20 Apr, 525y, €80,000)
Pos	Name of Greyhound	Trap	SP	Time	Trainer
1st	Knockeen Dazzler	6	5/2	28.10	Daniel O'Rahilly
2nd	Merits Inclusion	3	3/1	28.38	Brendan Matthews
3rd	Scooby Pacemaker	2	7/2	28.52	Jennifer O'Donnell
4th	Romeo Kingpin	1	9/4f	28.87	Graham Holland
5th	Epic Chick	4	5/1	29.01	John Kennedy Jr.
6th	Phoenix Tyson	5	16/1	29.36	Ian Reilly

Sporting Press Oaks, Shelbourne Park (15 Jun, 525y, €25,000)
Pos	Name of Greyhound	Trap	SP	Time	Trainer
1st	A Lucky Julie (dead heat)	6	3/1	28.53	James Melia
1st	Fleadh Saraide (dead heat)	1	14/1	28.53	Murt Leahy
3rd	Droopys Edel	4	6/1	28.56	Ian Reilly
4th	Droopys Fidget	2	4/1	28.70	Robert G. Gleeson
5th	Droopys Mandolin	3	1/1f	28.91	Robert G. Gleeson
6th	Short Grip	5	4/1	29.12	Patrick Cocoman

Kasko Petfood National Produce, Clonmel (23 Jun, 525y, €20,000)
Pos	Name of Greyhound	Trap	SP	Time	Trainer
1st	Unamimouspanther	1	9/4	28.38	Pat Buckley
2nd	In Good Time	6	9/2	28.59	Brendan Maunsell
3rd	Romeo Taylor	5	13/8f	28.90	Graham Holland
4th	Quarry Boy	3	25/1	29.04	Paula Heffernan
5th	Silverhill Adam	4	4/1	29.15	Graham Holland
6th	Romeo Kingpin	2	10/1	29.32	Graham Holland

Boylesports Champion Stakes, Shelbourne Park (6 Jul, 550y, €20,000)
Pos	Name of Greyhound	Trap	SP	Time	Trainer
1st	Daleroad Duke	1	5/2jf	29.42	Patrick Guilfoyle
2nd	Carmac King	2	4/1	29.63	Owen McKenna
3rd	Knockeen Dazzler	6	5/2jf	29.98	Daniel O'Rahilly
4th	Superfast Gorden	3	7/2	29.99	Pat Buckley
5th	Maireads Prince	4	14/1	30.13	Fraser Black
6th	Lets Go Bubbles	5	7/1	30.14	Owen McKenna

Time Dundalk International, Dundalk (12 Jul, 550y, €20,000)
Pos	Name of Greyhound	Trap	SP	Time	Trainer
1st	Droopys Mandolin	2	/	29.72	Robert G. Gleeson
2nd	Tribal Syd	6	/	29.81	Murt Leahy
3rd	Unanimouspanther	1	/	30.02	Pat Buckley
4th	Daleroad Duke	3	/	30.19	Patrick Guilfoyle
5th	Coolavanny Otto	5	/	30.89	Pat Buckley
6th	Singalong Dolly	4	/	00.00	Pat Buckley

Bar One Racing Irish Sprint Cup, Dundalk (15 Aug, 400y, €20,000)
Pos	Name of Greyhound	Trap	SP	Time	Trainer
1st	Broadstrand Syd	2	/	20.67	John A. Linehan
2nd	Elite Kursk	6	/	20.76	Myles Roban
3rd	Road Exile	4	/	21.04	Pat Buckley
4th	Ballymac Finn	1	/	21.11	Liam Dowling
5th	Carrick Aldo	5	/	21.26	David Murray
6th	On The Nose	3	/	21.53	Peter Cronin

WillWeGo.com Irish St Leger, Limerick (17 Aug, 550y, €30,000)
Pos	Name of Greyhound	Trap	SP	Time	Trainer
1st	Clonbrien Treaty	6	5/4f	29.28	Graham Holland
2nd	Miami King	3	6/1	29.38	Garry Dempsey
3rd	Barefoot on Fire	4	5/1	29.45	Paul Hennessy
4th	Jaytee Crazy	1	10/3	29.49	Paul Hennessy
5th	Coolavanny Otto	2	8/1	29.51	Pat Buckley
6th	Ventry Faith	5	9/1	29.86	Owen McKenna

Time Greyhound Nutrition Juvenile Derby, Shelbourne Park (31 Aug, 525y, €25,000)
Pos	Name of Greyhound	Trap	SP	Time	Trainer
1st	Callaway Knegare	4	1/2f	27.96	Owen McKenna
2nd	Innfield Destiny	2	25/1	28.20	Barry Clancy
3rd	Ballymac Briar	1	10/3	28.24	Lim Dowling
4th	Hello Diego	6	20/1	28.27	Paul Hennessy
5th	Tivoli Milo	5	9/1	28.48	Thomas O'Donnovan
6th	Boylesports Blue	3	7/1	28.54	Paul Hennessy

BarOne Racing Irish Laurels, Cork (5 Oct, 525y, €30,000)
Pos	Name of Greyhound	Trap	SP	Time	Trainer
1st	Crafty Shivoo	4	1/1f	28.52	Patrick Norris
2nd	Hazelhill Bucko	6	12/1	28.83	Lucy Roche
3rd	Romeo Taylor	2	3/1	29.15	Graham Holland
4th	Droopys Polish	1	7/2	29.16	John A. Lineham
5th	Seek The Kingdom	3	20/1	29.26	Paul Hennessy
6th	High Trend	5	10/1	29.44	Graham Holland

=== Calendar & results ===
Date	Competition	Venue	1st prize	Winner
20 Jan	ARC Cesarewitch	Central Park	£12,500	Garfiney Blaze
20 Jan	BGBF Puppy Cup	Oxford	£10,000	Romeo Cypher
21 Jan	Blue Riband	Towcester	£10,000	Signet Goofy
26 Jan	Coral Essex Vase	Romford	£10,000	Roxys Bullet
15 Feb	ARC Northern Puppy Derby	Newcastle	£12,500	Clona Curly
17 Feb	Ladbrokes Winter Derby	Monmore	£10,000	Churchfield Syd
24 Feb	Premier Greyhound Racing Golden Jacket	Crayford	£20,000	Dazl Rolex
24 Feb	Shelbourne Tote Gold Cup	Shelbourne	€16,000	Boylesports Coco
8 Mar	Juvenile Classic	Tralee	€11,000	Ballymac Patriot
15 Mar	Coral Golden Sprint	Romford	£10,000	Front Alice
17 Mar	Time Irish Cesarewitch	Mullingar	€10,000	Singalong Dolly
18 Mar	BGBF British Breeders Stakes	Nottingham	£12,500	Acomb Felix
22 Mar	The Deadly Kennels McCalmont Cup	Kilkenny	€7,000	Bogger Dusty
23 Mar	Stadium Bookmakers TV Trophy	Oxford	£15,000	Bubbly Inferno
30 Mar	Premier Greyhound Racing Puppy Derby	Monmore	£20,000	Untold Dollar
30 Mar	ARC Kent Plate	Central Park	£12,500	Queen Joni
6 Apr	Bresbet Easter Cup	Shelbourne	€25,000	Clonbrien Treaty
12 Apr	bet365 Hunt Cup	Oxford	£10,000	Havana Top Note
14 Apr	Time Greyhound Nutrition Juvenile	Towcester	£3,000	Faypoint Harvey
19 Apr	Arena Racing Company Grand Prix	Sunderland	£12,500	Farneys Willie
20 Apr	Con & Annie Kirby Memorial	Limerick	€80,000	Knockeen Dazzler
21 Apr	BresBet Gymcrack	Sheffield	£17,500	Wicky Ned
27 Apr	Coral Brighton Belle	Hove	£10,000	Queen Joni
27 Apr	Arena Racing Company Laurels	Perry Barr	£12,500	Kilwest Ranger
27 Apr	TIME Greyhound Nutrition Waterford Select Stakes	Waterford	€10,000	Droopys Fidget
28 Apr	KAB Maiden Derby	Towcester	£10,000	Jaytee Etienne
4 May	Shelbourne 600	Shelbourne	€15,000	Ryhope Beach
18 May	Ladbrokes Kent Vase	Crayford	£1,000	Kuda Honey
18 May	Ladbrokes Kent St Leger	Crayford	£10,000	Coonough Crow
26 May	Three Steps to Victory	Sheffield	£10,000	Queen Georgia
14 Jun	Coral Coronation Cup	Romford	£10,000	New Destiny
14 Jun	Callaway ProAm at Stud Race of Champions	Tralee	€15,000	Coolavanny Otto
15 Jun	ARC Kent Silver Salver	Central Park	£12,500	Magical Bluebear
15 Jun	Sporting Press Online Oaks	Shelbourne	€25,000	A Lucky Julie & Fleadh Saraide
23 Jun	Kasko Petfood National Produce	Clonmel	€20,000	Unamimouspanther
29 Jun	Star Sports & TRC Events & Leisure English Greyhound Derby	Towcester	£235,000	De Lahdedah
29 Jun	Corn Cuchulainn	Shelbourne	€10,500	Tuono Charlie
6 Jul	Boylesports Champion Stakes	Shelbourne	€20,000	Daleroad Duke
6 Jul	Centenary Agri Tipperary Cup	Thurles	€7,500	Tribal Syd
12 Jul	Time Dundalk International	Dundalk	€20,000	Droopys Mandolin
21 Jul	Ladbrokes Champion Hurdle	Crayford	£10,000	Nunhead Shiv
25 Jul	Time Greyhound Feed Northern Flat	Newcastle	£12,500	Wicky Ned
25 Jul	ARC Angel of the North	Newcastle	£7,500	Untold Rebel
27 Jul	BetGoodwin Pall Mall	Oxford	£10,000	Aero Sacundai
27 Jul	Premier Greyhound Racing Regency	Hove	£20,000	Baywatch Bullet
27 Jul	Coral Sussex Cup	Hove	£10,000	Newinn Benni
28 Jul	Genco Group Juvenile Classic	Towcester	£5,000	Slick Sentinel
15 Aug	Bar One Racing Irish Sprint Cup	Dundalk	€20,000	Broadstrand Syd
17 Aug	Willwego Irish St Leger	Limerick	€30,000	Clonbrien Treaty
18 Aug	Ladbrokes Guys and Dolls	Crayford	£5,000	Mini Eva
24 Aug	Ladbrokes Summer Stayers Classic	Monmore	£10,000	Droopys Clue
24 Aug	Ladbrokes Gold Cup	Monmore	£10,000	Churchfield Syd
26 Aug	JenningsBet Puppy Classic	Nottingham	£12,500	March On Freddie
26 Aug	JenningsBet Select Stakes	Nottingham	£12,500	Unanimouspanther
31 Aug	Time Greyhound Nutrition Juvenile Derby	Shelbourne	€25,000	Callaway Knegare
15 Sep	Empress Stakes	Towcester	£10,000	Avongate Venus
18 Sep	Click Competitions East Anglian Derby	Yarmouth	£15,000	Druids Say Go
19 Sep	77th Produce Stakes	Swindon	£10,000	Southfield Poppy
27 Sep	Coral Romford Puppy Cup	Romford	£10,000	Fire and Ice
28 Sep	M Lambe Construction Birmingham Cup	Perry Barr	£12,500	Rioja Bungle
28 Sep	Premier Greyhound Racing St Leger	Perry Barr	£20,000	Droopys Clue
5 Oct	BarOne Racing Irish Laurels	Cork	€30,000	Crafty Shivoo
18 Oct	Premier Greyhound Racing Champion Stakes	Romford	£20,000	New Destiny
19 Oct	Premier Greyhound Racing Kent Derby	Central Park	£20,000	Droopys Display
20 Oct	BresBet Steel City Cup	Sheffield	£11,500	Wicky Ned
26 Oct	ARC Scurry Gold Cup	Perry Barr	£7,500	Rioja Oisin
26 Oct	Premier Greyhound Racing Oaks	Perry Barr	£20,000	Druids Say Go
15 Nov	Premier Greyhound Racing Classic	Sunderland	£20,000	Bramble Linton
23 Nov	Boylesports Irish Greyhound Derby	Shelbourne	€125,000	Bockos Diamond
24 Nov	Ladbrokes Grand National	Crayford	£10,000	Signet Harper
24 Nov	Ladbrokes Gold Collar	Crayford	£10,000	Aayamza Sydney
24 Nov	Kent Rosebowl	Crayford	£1,000	Yahoo Megan
24 Nov	English Puppy Derby	Towcester	£10,000	Bombay Birch
25 Nov	Premier Greyhound Racing Eclipse	Nottingham	£20,000	Romeo Command
14 Dec	bet365 Challenge Cup	Oxford	£10,000	New Destiny
14 Dec	George Curtis/Ballyregan Bob Memorial	Hove	£10,000	Garfiney Blaze
14 Dec	Coral Olympic	Hove	£10,000	Proper Heiress
22 Dec	bet365 Puppy Oaks	Towcester	£10,000	Yahoo Maizy
22 Dec	British Bred Breeders Forum Derby	Sheffield	£10,000	Keefill Rocky
23 Dec	ARC National Sprint	Nottingham	£7,500	Niosfearrnabolt
27 Dec	Premier Greyhound Racing All England Cup	Newcastle	£20,000	Wicky Ned
