= 2013 Irish Greyhound Derby =

Annual sporting event in Ireland

2013 Enterprise Target Solutions Irish Greyhound Derby
- Venue: Shelbourne Park
- Location: Dublin
- Start date: 8 August
- End date: 14 September
- Total prize money: €120,000 (winner)

The 2013 Irish Greyhound Derby took place during August and September with the final being held at Shelbourne Park in Dublin on 14 September 2013.

The winner Slippery Robert won €120,000 and was trained by Robert Gleeson, owned and bred by Larry Dunne. The race was sponsored by the UK-based independent finance company Enterprise Target Solutions (ETS).

== Final result ==
At Shelbourne, 14 September (over 550 yards):

Position	Winner	Breeding	Trap	Sectional	SP	Time	Trainer
1st	Slippery Robert	Hondo Black - Steamy Windows	6	3.46	5-1	29.49	Robert Gleeson
2nd	Cabra Buck	Big Daddy Cool - Cabra Belle	5	3.34	5-2	29.63	Graham Holland
3rd	Tyrur Sugar Ray	Top Honcho - Maireads Fantasy	2	3.46	6-4f	29.77	Conor Fahy
4th	Carrowgarriff	Westmead Hawk - Wicked Marita	3	3.39	25-1	30.08	Ollie Curtin
5th	Ballymac Vic	Kinloch Brae - Ballymac Vicky	1	3.45	3-1	30.12	Liam Dowling
N/R	Kereight King	Droopys Maldini - Quam Celerrime	4				Pat Curtin (Ireland)

=== Distances ===
1¾, 1¾, 3¾, ½ (lengths)

== Competition Report ==
Defending champion Skywalker Puma, Ballymac Vic, Droopys Jet and recent Champions Stakes winner Paradise Madison were the leading contenders for the 2013 Irish Derby. The English threat came in the form of Holdem Spy. A mandatory first round acted as a trial because only 16 from 120 would be eliminated which was lucky for Ballymac Vic who could only finish fifth but still qualified.

In round two only Paradise Madison, Kereight King and Tyrur Sugar Ray remained unbeaten. Skywalker Puma who had impressed in the first round finished badly lame and was withdrawn. Kereight King posted the best third round time and became the new favourite but all the major names also progressed. The event was set for very competitive quarter finals but suffered a double blow before they started. The English hope Holdem Spy had suffered a hock injury when winning previously and Ballymac Vic gashed his foot at his home kennels.

The first three quarter finals were won by Cabra Buck, Hawaii Kinsale and Isabels Boy win the first three heats, Droopys Jet was eliminated but Ballymac Vic qualified but ran under par with his patched up foot. The fourth heat contained Kereight King, Paradise Madison, Ringtown Snowy and Tyrur Sugar Ray and it was Kereight King confirming his favourite tag who won the race. Tyrur Sugar Ray ran well again to finish second but Paradise Madison and Ringtown Snowy failed to progress. Pat Curtin's Kereight King was now clear favourite.

The semi-final were as expected, Tyrur Sugar Ray won the weaker heat from Slippery Robert and Carrowgarriff and Cabra Buck continued his good run defeating Kereight King and Ballymac Vic. After the draw for the final it was revealed that Kereight King had broken a toe and Ballymac Vic had split his foot again. It meant a five dog final and Ballymac Vic would not be at his best.

If the unnecessary first round had been cancelled it would have been likely that both Kereight King and Ballymac Vic could have competed in the final at their best. The five runner race saw Slippery Robert gain victory after taking the lead at the third bend from Cabra Buck. The under par Ballymac Vic held up the gambled Tyrur Sugar Ray at the first bend ending his chances.

== Quarter finals ==
Heat 1 (Aug 31)
Pos	Name	SP	Time
1st	Cabra Buck	5-1	29.99
2nd	Droopys Adler	7-1	30.04
3rd	Ballymac Vic	6-4f	30.18
4th	Ballyana Foxtrot	5-1	30.36
5th	Hot Pursuit	11-4	30.37
6th	Fairhill Paddy	12-1	30.58

Heat 2 (Aug 31)
Pos	Name	SP	Time
1st	Hawaii Kinsale	5-4f	30.08
2nd	Slippery Sooty	7-4	30.18
3rd	Carrowgarriff	14-1	30.29
4th	El Flutter	4-1	30.43
5th	Fridays Carroll	8-1	30.95
N/R	Holdem Spy		

Heat 3 (Aug 31)
Pos	Name	SP	Time
1st	Isabels Boy	4-1	30.33
2nd	Melodys Diamond	4-1	30.35
3rd	Borna Gem	4-1	30.40
4th	Droopys Jet	2-1f	30.58
5th	Holycross Gerry	6-1	30.63
6th	Nothing Simple	10-1	30.80

Heat 4 (Aug 31)
Pos	Name	SP	Time
1st	Kereight King	7-4f	29.87
2nd	Tyrur Sugar Ray	3-1	30.01
3rd	Slippery Robert	6-1	30.02
4th	Glenanore Dancer	12-1	30.19
5th	Paradise Madison	4-1	30.44
6th	Ringtown Snowy	12-1	30.51

== Semi finals ==
First Semi Final (Sep 7)
Pos	Name of Greyhound	SP	Time
1st	Tyrur Sugar Ray	5-2jf	29.87
2nd	Slippery Robert	5-2jf	30.08
3rd	Carrowgarriff	33-1	30.18
4th	Hawaii Kinsale	7-1	30.22
5th	Droopys Adler	6-1	30.29
6th	Isabals Boy	7-2	30.46

Second Semi Final (Sep 7)
Pos	Name of Greyhound	SP	Time
1st	Cabra Buck	5-1	29.65
2nd	Ballymac Vic	2-1	29.72
3rd	Kereight King	7-4f	30.00
4th	Borna Gem	5-1	30.21
5th	Melodys Diamond	8-1	30.24
6th	Slippery Sooty	16-1	30.73

== See also ==
- 2013 UK & Ireland Greyhound Racing Year
