= 2015 Irish Greyhound Derby =

2015 Boylesports Irish Greyhound Derby
- Location: Shelbourne Park
- Start date: 13 August
- End date: 19 September
- Total prize money: €125,000 (winner)

The 2015 Boylesports Irish Greyhound Derby took place during August and September with the final being held on 19 September 2015 at Shelbourne Park. The winner Ballymac Matt picked up the first prize of €125,000 that was on offer. The competition was sponsored by Boylesports.

== Final result ==
At Shelbourne Park (over 550 yards):

Position	Name of Greyhound	Breeding	Trap	Sectional	SP	Finish Time	Trainer
1st	Ballymac Matt	Tyrur Big Mike - Ballymac Scarlet	3	3.46	3-1	29.63	Liam Dowling
2nd	Farloe Blitz	Premier Fantasy - Final Oyster	1	3.41	1-1f	29.68	Owen McKenna
3rd	Farloe Rumble	Ace Hi Rumble - Final Oyster	6	3.60	16-1	29.73	Owen McKenna
4th	Peregrine Falcon	Ace Hi Rumble - Minefield	4	3.49	12-1	29.79	Patrick O’Brien
5th	Cable Bay	Foleys Folley - Toms Delight	2	3.67	6-1	29.82	Brendan Matthews
6th	Gaytime Hawk	Westmead Hawk - Gaytime Grettie	5	3.50	7-2	29.93	Graham Holland

=== Distances ===
¾, ¾, ¾, ½, 1½ (lengths)

=== Competition Race Report ===
Laughil Blake headed the Irish Derby entries after missing the English Greyhound Derby. Farloe Blitz joined him at the top of the ante-post betting after his English Derby campaign. Only one British connection travelled to Ireland to take part. Laughil Blake was taken out coughing before the first round and was retired to stud. When the action started Ballymac Matt went fastest during both the first and second rounds (29.43 & 29.47); Farloe Blitz impressed but Slippery Fred, Laughil Duke and Riverside Pat were all eliminated. The night before the tricky third round a greyhound called Tyrur Van Gaal broke the track record, stopping the clock at 29.10; van Gaal had failed to make it past the first round.

Ballymac Matt recorded a third successive fastest round win in round three, setting a time of 29.44. Peregrine Falcon remained the only other greyhound unbeaten recording 29.50 and Samiya looked good with a 29.46 success. Big names Farloe Blitz, Paradise Maverick and Sidarian Vega all squeezed through to the quarter-finals after third-place finishes in their respective heats, but Oaks champion Ballydoyle Honey failed to progress.

The quarter-finals saw Farloe Blitz bounce back to his best and easily winning the first heat; Rural Hawaii & Samiya made it no further. Heat two was won by Ballymac Matt, but his win time was bettered by other heat winners for the first time in the competition. The final two heats went to Gaytime Hawk and Peregrine Falcon; the former recorded 29.34 and the latter remained unbeaten. Paradise Maverick and Sidarian Vega both disappointed and made it no further.

As the semifinals got underway, it was the four quarter-final heat winners that were the favourites to claim a place in the final on 13 September. Gaytime Hawk picked up the weaker heat from Farloe Rumble and Kirby Memorial Stakes champion Cable Bay. The much stronger second heat resulted in Farloe Blitz from trap 2 defeating Ballymac Matt from 1 with Peregrine Falcon claiming third from Save the Don.

In the final Farloe Blitz was hot favourite after drawing the red jacket, but on paper the final looked very competitive. As the traps opened Farloe Blitz controlled the race as he maintained a nice lead from the start, but Ballymac Matt was prominent and pulled back Farloe Blitz on the run-in despite losing ground at the third bend. Ballymac Matt deserved the win, and Farloe Rumble finished strongly to take third place. Ballymac Matt later won the 2015 Irish Greyhound of the Year.

== Quarter-finals ==
Heat 1 (5 September)
Pos	Name	SP	Time
1st	Farloe Blitz	1-1f	29.44
2nd	Blue Cafu	8-1	29.75
3rd	Shutthe Backdoor	16-1	29.96
4th	Rural Hawaii	3-1	29.98
5th	Dolcino Flyer	14-1	29.99
6th	Samiya	5-2	30.10

Heat 2 (5 September)
Pos	Name	SP	Time
1st	Ballymac Matt	2-5f	29.64
2nd	Highview Apollo	10-1	29.71
3rd	Save The Don	7-2	29.99
4th	Priceless Lassie	10-1	30.09
5th	Jo Jo Fantasy	33-1	30.20
6th	Ivy Hill Bart	14-1	30.30

Heat 3 (5 September)
Pos	Name	SP	Time
1st	Gaytime Hawk	5-1	29.34
2nd	Tyrur Tommy	2-1cf	29.65
3rd	Farloe Rumble	5-1	29.72
4th	Fair Taxes	2-1cf	29.79
5th	Paradise Maverik	2-1cf	29.90
6th	Offshore Bound	7-1	30.11

Heat 4 (5 September)
Pos	Name	SP	Time
1st	Peregrine Falcon	3-1cf	29.50
2nd	Cable Bay	7-2	29.55
3rd	Jaytee Jet	3-1cf	29.69
4th	Lemon Miley	16-1	29.73
5th	Secreto	3-1cf	29.87
6th	Sidarian Vega	6-1	30.11

== Semifinals ==
First Semifinal (12 September)
Pos	Name of Greyhound	SP	Time
1st	Gaytime Hawk	6-4f	29.41
2nd	Farloe Rumble	7-1	29.58
3rd	Cable Bay	4-1	29.65
4th	Tyrur Tommy	7-2	29.72
5th	Jaytee Jet	5-1	29.76
6th	Blue Cafu	7-1	30.14

Second Semifinal (12 September)
Pos	Name of Greyhound	SP	Time
1st	Farloe Blitz	1-1f	29.54
2nd	Ballymac Matt	2-1	29.59
3rd	Peregrine Falcon	6-1	29.84
4th	Save The Don	8-1	29.98
5th	Shutthe Backdoor	33-1	30.05
6th	Highview Apollo	16-1	30.06

== See also ==
- 2015 UK & Ireland Greyhound Racing Year
