= 2013 UK & Ireland Greyhound Racing Year =

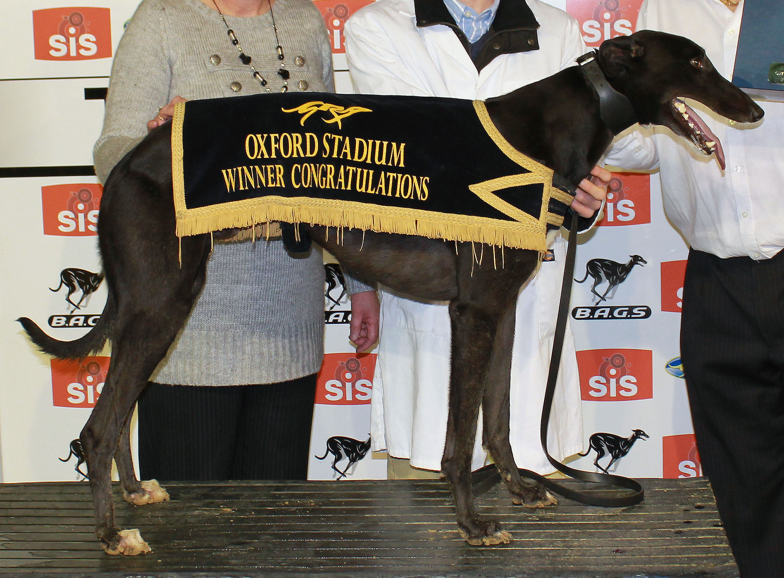
- Golden Jacket finalist Eden Rumble

2013 UK & Ireland Greyhound Racing Year was the 88th year of greyhound racing in the United Kingdom and the 87th year of greyhound racing in Ireland.

== Summary ==
=== Tracks ===
The GRA was subject to a management lease buyout, Wimbledon's lease was shorter than the rest of the tracks bringing the future of the track into serious question. The Oaks was switched to sister track Belle Vue meaning that Wimbledon had now lost the Laurels, Grand National and Oaks in recent years. Leading owner John Turner stepped in to save the Puppy Derby by sponsoring the event.

In Ireland, Newbridge which was leased by Morwell Racing Ltd ceased trading and left the stadium vacant. The Irish Greyhound Board stepped in to save the track and installed a management team to run it. The third BAGS/SIS track championship went to Sheffield who outpointed defending champions Newcastle in the final at Sheffield. Coventry continued to offer excellent open race prize money but suffered a blow when Racing Manager Martyn Dore left the track.

=== Competitions ===
Ballymac Eske secured victories in the Juvenile and Scottish Greyhound Derby. Charlie Lister OBE had a year to remember following a record breaking seventh English Greyhound Derby with Sidaz Jack and sixth trainers championship at Yarmouth.

Slippery Robert trained by Robert Gleeson took the Irish Derby. The William Hill Grand Prix resulted in a dead heat between Hometown Honey and Calzaghe Lilly.

Charlie Lister had four finalists in the St Leger final and his hot favourite Farloe Tango broke the track record when claiming the competition. Farloe Tango then won the Greyhound of the Year. Mark Wallis sealed a fifth trainer's title in nine years.

=== News ===
The Racing Post TV channel had a significant presence in the reporting of greyhound racing but the Greyhound Star began to consider plans to go online. Ladbrokes stepped in to sponsor the Scottish Derby which was at risk of being cancelled. Jim Woods retired after 31 years as a Racing Manager at Perry Barr, Nottingham, Leeds and Monmore.

Trainer Stuart Mason had his licence removed and is fined £1,500 by the Greyhound Board of Great Britain following three cases of positive tests for amphetamine.

== Roll of honour ==
Major Winners
Award	Name of Winner
2013 English Greyhound Derby	Sidaz Jack
2013 Irish Greyhound Derby	Slippery Robert
Greyhound Trainer of the Year	Mark Wallis
Greyhound of the Year	Farloe Tango
Irish Greyhound of the Year	Locnamon Bridie

Ladbrokes Trainers Championship, Yarmouth (27 March)
Pos	Name of Trainer	Points
1st	Charlie Lister OBE	55
2nd	Paul Young	51
3rd	Mark Wallis	36
4th	Seamus Cahill	31
5th	Chris Allsopp	27
6th	Barrie Draper	22

BAGS/SIS Track Championship, Sheffield (23 December)
Pos	Track	Points
1st	Sheffield	70
2nd	Newcastle	51
3rd	Peterborough	45
4th	Hove	44
5th	Romford	37
6th	Hall Green	33

=== Principal UK finals ===
Ladbrokes Golden Jacket, Crayford (18 February, 714m, £15,000)
Pos	Name of Greyhound	Trainer	SP	Time	Trap
1st	White Soks Roks	Daniel Riordan	4-5f	45.48	6
2nd	Droopys Xavier	Claude Gardiner	9-4	45.74	2
3rd	Pony Bride	Kevin Hutton	20-1	45.76	3
4th	Crinkill Jewell	Kevin Hutton	10-1	45.80	4
5th	Eden Rumble	Alma Keppie	12-1	46.14	1
6th	Paulines Pride	Darren Whitton	6-1	46.83	5

Ladbrokes Scottish Derby, Shawfield (4 May, 480m, £10,000)
Pos	Name of Greyhound	Trainer	SP	Time	Trap
1st	Ballymac Eske	Barrie Draper	4-7f	28.75	1
2nd	Mags Gamble	Harry Williams	5-1	29.31	3
3rd	Greenwell Mentor	Pat Flaherty	12-1	29.35	4
4th	Teejays Bluehawk	Paul Young	6-1	29.37	2
5th	Greenwell Lark	Pat Flaherty	16-1	29.47	6
6th	Tarbrook Tornado	Frazer Black	6-1	29.49	5

William Hill Classic, Sunderland (18 July, 450m, £25,000)
Pos	Name of Greyhound	Trainer	SP	Time	Trap
1st	Pinpoint Maxi	Kelly Macari	4-5f	27.02	1
2nd	Droopys Pride	Elaine Parker	12-1	27.21	4
3rd	Shaneboy Spencer	Liz McNair	5-1	27.35	2
4th	Young Golden	Paul Young	33-1	27.37	5
5th	Shaneboy Alley	Liz McNair	6-4	27.61	6
6th	Bubbly Rocket	Paul Young	10-1	27.89	3

William Hill Grand Prix, Sunderland (18 July, 640m, £15,000)
Pos	Name of Greyhound	Trainer	SP	Time	Trap
1st*	Hometown Honey	Mark Wallis	5-1	39.95	5
1st*	Calzaghe Lilly	Ted Soppitt	1-1f	39.95	6
3rd	Britania Rachel	Claude Gardiner	10-1	40.21	3
4th	Bangcrashwallop	Heather Dimmock	6-1	40.23	2
5th	Dural Bound	Maxine Locke	9-4	40.29	4
6th	Sidelight	Chris Allsopp	6-1	40.45	1

Paddy Power TV Trophy, Yarmouth (4 September, 843m, £8,000)
Pos	Name of Greyhound	Trainer	SP	Time	Trap
1st	Musical Gaga	Dean Childs	1-2f	52.94	5
2nd	Blonde Reagan	Mark Wallis	18-1	53.40	6
3rd	Incitatus	Chris Allsopp	9-1	53.53	4
4th	Farloe Tango	Charlie Lister OBE	5-2	53.55	2
5th	Freedom Cache	Paul Donovan	16-1	53.97	1
6th	Golden Donaire	David Mullins	40-1	54.14	3

East Anglian Derby, Yarmouth (19 September, 462m, £12,000)
Pos	Name of Greyhound	Trainer	SP	Time	Trap
1st	Any Dak	Hazel Kemp	4-6f	27.34	6
2nd	Aero Tobias	Dean Childs	5-1	27.51	3
3rd	Bridge Honcho	Mark Wallis	6-1	27.65	4
4th	Frettenham Flyer	Terry Hunter	20-1	27.77	5
5th	Son of Delboy	Stuart Buckland	3-1	27.90	1
6th	Airtech Alfie	Paul Young	15-2	28.36	2

Grand National, Sittingbourne (17 October, 480mH, £7,500)
Pos	Name of Greyhound	Trainer	SP	Time	Trap
1st	Mash Mad Snowy	Seamus Cahill	5-2	29.31	4
2nd	Westmead Meteor	Ricky Holloway	4-1	29.39	5
3rd	Lollylips	Julie Luckhurst	20-1	29.57	3
4th	Droopys Lorenzo	Dean Childs	6-5f	29.68	6
5th	Mo Realta Frank	Ricky Holloway	5-1	29.70	1
6th	Westmead Melanie	Nick Savva	14-1	29.82	2

William Hill St Leger, Wimbledon (12 November, 687m, £15,000)
Pos	Name of Greyhound	Trainer	SP	Time	Trap
1st	Farloe Tango	Charlie Lister OBE	5-4f	41.40+	4
2nd	Fear Emoski	Charlie Lister OBE	9-2	41.95	3
3rd	Killieford Khali	Charlie Lister OBE	33-1	42.00	6
4th	Droopys Posh	Seamus Cahill	6-1	42.08	2
5th	Musical Gaga	Dean Childs	7-1	42.10	1
6th	Airforce Diva	Charlie Lister OBE	3-1	42.20	5

ECC Timber Oaks, Belle Vue (19 December, 470m, £15,000)
Pos	Name of Greyhound	Trainer	SP	Time	Trap
1st	Droopys Danneel	Kevin Hutton	7-4f	27.97	6
2nd	Greenwell Lark	Pat Flaherty	11-4	28.05	5
3rd	Caribbean Trixie	Bob Hall	10-1	28.25	4
4th	Silverview Pinky	Charlie Lister OBE	3-1	28.37	2
5th	Droopys Loner	Dean Childs	10-1	28.41	1
6th	Akerview Gem	Jimmy Wright	11-2	28.53	3

ECC Timber Laurels, Belle Vue (19 December, 470m, £6,000)
Pos	Name of Greyhound	Trainer	SP	Time	Trap
1st	Mileheight Alba	Pat Rosney	2-1f	27.65	1
2nd	Eden Star	Barrie Draper	3-1	27.77	2
3rd	Underground Paul	Paul Young	8-1	27.91	5
4th	Thinking Big	Phil Ward	4-1	28.13	4
5th	Young Golden	Paul Young	16-1	28.17	6
6th	Jaytee Lightning	Paul Young	5-2	28.27	3

* dead-heat

+ track record

=== Principal Irish finals ===
Con & Anne Kirby Memorial Stakes, Limerick (30 March, 525y, €80,000)
Pos	Name of Greyhound	Trainer	SP	Time	Trap
1st	Roxholme Bully	Owen McKenna	11-8f	28.35	1
2nd	Oran Maestro	Davy Reynolds	9-2	28.45	4
3rd	Droopys Banner	Patrick Guilfoyle	12-1	28.59	5
4th	Kisses For Cloda	Daniel Butler	5-2	28.73	3
5th	Melodys Gamble	Tim O’Donovan	9-2	28.80	2
6th	Royal Diva	Oliver Bray	12-1	28.91	6

College Causeway/Killahan Phanter Easter Cup, Shelbourne (13 April, 550y, €25,000)
Pos	Name of Greyhound	Trainer	SP	Time	Trap
1st	North Bound	Niall Dunne	4-1	29.46	6
2nd	Ballymac Vic	Liam Dowling	4-5f	29.88	3
3rd	Ashfield Impact	Vinnie Morris	5-1	30.19	4
4th	Insane Spartacus	Paul Corrigan	10-1	30.30	5
5th	Cabra Buck	Graham Holland	4-1	30.30	1
N/R	Droopys Adler	John Linehan			2

Connolly's Red Mills Produce, Clonmel (12 May, 525y, €20,000)
Pos	Name of Greyhound	Trainer	SP	Time	Trap
1st	Christys Bolt	Owen McKenna	2-1	28.58	3
2nd	Graduation Day	Pat Dalton	10-1	28.68	5
3rd	Farloe Calvin	Owen McKenna	1-1f	28.70	6
4th	Fear Big Star	Owen McKenna	5-1	28.84	4
5th	Ballyhill Jaguar	Graham Holland	10-1	28.88	1
6th	Melodys Gamble	Patrick Collins	5-1	28.91	2

Sporting Press Oaks, Shelbourne (22 June, 525y, €25,000)
Pos	Name of Greyhound	Trainer	SP	Time	Trap
1st	Locnamon Bridie	Paul Hennessy	5-1	28.23	3
2nd	Badminton Girl	Donal Murphy	4-1	28.37	5
3rd	Melodys Diamond	Declan Byrne	4-1	28.39	1
4th	Borna Gem	Ruairi Dwan	5-4f	28.56	2
5th	Airforce Diva	Owen McKenna	5-1	28.70	4
6th	Royal Diva	Oliver Bray	20-1	28.98	5

Townviewfoods.com Champion Stakes, Shelbourne (27 July, 550y, €20,000)
Pos	Name of Greyhound	Trainer	SP	Time	Trap
1st	Paradise Madison	Oliver Bray	6-4f	29.46	5
2nd	Jaxx On Fantasy	John McGee Sr.	5-1	29.60	4
3rd	Melodys Diamond	Declan Byrne	5-1	29.74	6
4th	Fear Big Star	Owen McKenna	12-1	29.95	1
5th	Lodgefield Turbo	Peter Traynor	3-1	30.05	2
6th	Droopys Adler	John Linehan	8-1	30.26	3

HX Bookmakers Puppy Derby, Harolds Cross (11 October, 525y, €15,000)
Pos	Name of Greyhound	Trainer	SP	Time	Trap
1st	Vanrooney	Owen McKenna	7-2	28.66	4
2nd	Newlawn Impact	Patrick Guilfoyle	2-1f	28.69	5
3rd	Aclamon Messi	Robert Gleeson	5-2	28.73	6
4th	El Flutter	Nick Hendy	8-1	28.76	1
5th	Mays King	Ian Lawless	6-1	28.97	2
6th	Killinan Baby	Pat Buckley	6-1	29.22	3

Connolly's Red Mills Laurels, Cork (19 October, 525y, €30,000)
Pos	Name of Greyhound	Trainer	SP	Time	Trap
1st	Lassa Expedition	Rachel Wheeler	3-1	28.39	2
2nd	Cathys Clown	Peter Cronin	4-1	28.72	4
3rd	Glenanore Dancer	Tom O’Neill	5-4f	28.90	5
4th	Refuge Of Sinner	Frances O’Donnell	5-1	28.92	6
5th	Footprintsinsand	Lorraine Moore	14-1	29.02	1
6th	Parkgate Jet	Kieran Lynch	12-1	29.13	3

Kerry Agribusiness Irish St Leger, Limerick (23 November, 550y, €25,000)
Pos	Name of Greyhound	Trainer	SP	Time	Trap
1st	Locnamon Bridie	Paul Hennessy	3-1jf	29.34	3
2nd	Tyrur Sugar Ray	PJ Fahy	3-1jf	29.58	1
3rd	Jaytee Hellcat	Paul Hennessy	4-1	29.72	5
4th	Skywalker Farloe	Frances O’Donnell	4-1	30.04	6
5th	Rockview Turbo	Peter Cronin	4-1	30.09	4
6th	General Wolf	Graham Holland	6-1	30.20	2
