= 2010 UK & Ireland Greyhound Racing Year =

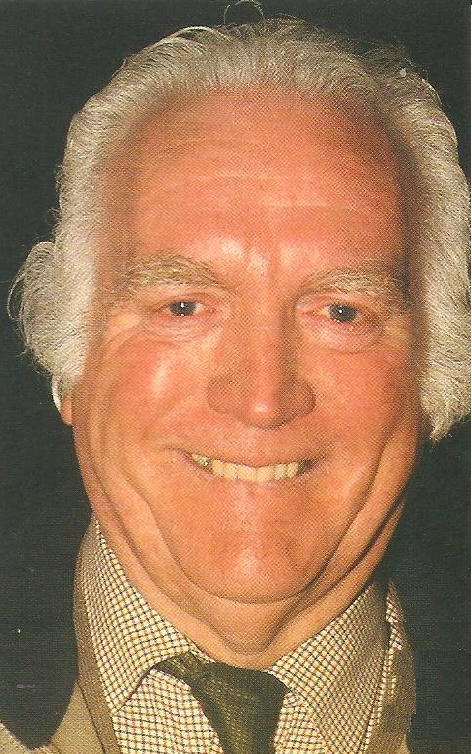
- Arthur Hitch was one of four prominent trainers that died during 2010.

2010 UK & Ireland Greyhound Racing Year was the 85th year of greyhound racing in the United Kingdom and the 84th year of greyhound racing in Ireland.

== Summary ==
Levy payments for greyhound racing went down again from £10 million to £8.5 million. Betting exchanges were impacting major bookmakers which in turn affected greyhound racing. Jimmy Lollie finished the year with a remarkable 35 open-race wins after winning the semi-final of the Scurry Cup at Belle Vue. Trained by Seamus Cahill the brindle dog went on to be voted greyhound of the year which was unusual for a sprinter. He was withdrawn from the final of the Scurry but did win the National Sprint, set four new track records and passed 50 career wins.

=== Tracks ===
Portsmouth Stadium under the control of manager Eric Graham closed under controversial circumstances. Within weeks of the unsuccessful application for a lease renewal Graham stated that the company would be wound up with immediate effect.

There was a new track in Limerick when the Limerick Greyhound Stadium was opened in October by minister of agriculture, fisheries and food Brendan Smith. It was built on the site of the old Greenpark Racecourse costing €18 million. The Irish Greyhound Board's latest showpiece had the facilities and comforts of a world-class stadium. The new venue was also served by a new tunnel linking Clare and Limerick.

=== Competitions ===
Toomaline Jack was an unlucky loser in the Grand National final, the Dolores Ruth trained Irish entry set a new hurdle track record but went lame leaving Plane Daddy to win the first prize. The Greyhound Racing Association decline continued with open race prize money decreases including the St Leger; the event was won by Droopys Bradley.

=== News ===
Champion trainer Mark Wallis joined Yarmouth from Harlow; Yarmouth had just undergone track improvements at the cost of £190,000. Matt Dartnall joined Swindon and Patrick Curtin joined Monmore. Seamus Cahill won his first trainers championship held at Doncaster and Carol Evans was sacked from Sheffield after being fined by the Greyhound Board of Great Britain following investigations into unusual betting patterns on Betfair accounts.

Bad weather during December resulted in many meetings cancelled all over the country. The Henlow Gold Cup suffered when several attempts to run the event were cancelled. Elsewhere huge numbers of greyhounds were required to grade on again (re-qualify) at many tracks, after they ran out of time under the sport's 28 day rule. Temperatures on Boxing Day (daytime) meetings were held at temperatures of minus 7 Celsius and below.

Four current and former leading trainers died. Philip Rees Jr., a long-time successful Wimbledon trainer died aged 67. Pam Heasman 85, Arthur Hitch 77 and Terry Duggan 77 also died during 2010. A former leading on-course bookmaker Tony Morris also died in March, aged 73.

== Roll of honour ==
Major Winners
Award	Name of Winner
2010 English Greyhound Derby	Bandicoot Tipoki
2010 Irish Greyhound Derby	Tyrur McGuigan
Greyhound Trainer of the Year	Seamus Cahill
Greyhound of the Year	Jimmy Lollie
Irish Dog and Bitch of the Year	Tyrur McGuigan / Dalcash Dvinsky

Betfair Trainers Championship, Doncaster (23 Mar)
Pos	Name of Trainer	Points
1st	Mark Wallis	49
2nd	Charlie Lister OBE	47
3rd	Barrie Draper	30
4th	Dean Childs	28
4th	Seamus Cahill	27
6th	Chris Allsopp	27

=== Principal UK finals ===
Bettor.com Scottish Derby, Shawfield (17 Apr, 480m, £25,000)
Pos	Name of Greyhound	Trainer	SP	Time	Trap
1st	Nambisco	Carly Philpott	7-4f	28.98	3
2nd	Ballymac Rebound	Craig Dawson	9-2	29.32	1
3rd	Westmead Scolari	Nick Savva	6-1	29.36	6
4th	Ardera Monarch	Craig Dawson	2-1	29.40	2
5th	Greenwell Viper	Patrick Flaherty	4-1	29.56	5
6th	Aero Ardiles	Nick Savva	12-1	29.68	4

William Hill Grand National, Wimbledon (29 Jun, 480mH, £7,500)
Pos	Name of Greyhound	Trainer	SP	Time	Trap
1st	Plane Daddy	Gemma Davidson	8-1	29.80	3
2nd	Nebuchadnezzar	Lorraine Sams	9-2	29.81	2
3rd	Sizzlers Spirit	Norah McEllistrim	12-1	29.94	1
4th	Romeo In Miami	Ricky Holloway	33-1	30.20	4
5th	Lenson Flash	Tony Collett	33-1	30.24	6
6th	Toomaline Jack	Dolores Ruth	2-5f	30.56	5

Betfair TV Trophy, Kinsley (15 June, 844m, £6,000)
Pos	Name of Greyhound	Trainer	SP	Time	Trap
1st	Midway Skipper	Henry Chalkley	5-1	52.91+	4
2nd	Taylors Riviera	Ted Soppitt	5-4f	52.97	6
3rd	Bubbly Eagle	Paul Young	9-1	53.21	2
4th	Oran Joker	David Acott	20-1	53.38	5
5th	Ministry Magpie	Lorraine Sams	8-1	53.50	1
6th	Tyrur Dream	Charlie Lister OBE	9-4	53.51	3

+ track record

William Hill Grand Prix, Sunderland (15 Jul, 640m, £15,000)
Pos	Name of Greyhound	Trainer	SP	Time	Trap
1st	England Expects	Jimmy Wright	7-4f	39.50	3
2nd	He Went Whoosh	Claude Gardiner	8-1	39.68	5
3rd	Kinda Easy	Mark Wallis	2-1	39.77	6
4th	Anfi Gem	Colin Redden	8-1	39.89	4
5th	Fatboyz Diva	Chris Allsopp	5-2	39.90	2
6th	Hesley Dingo	Jimmy Wright	16-1	40.25	1

William Hill Classic, Sunderland (15 Jul, 450m, £25,000)
Pos	Name of Greyhound	Trainer	SP	Time	Trap
1st	Target Classic	Craig Dawson	7-2	26.94	5
2nd	Ballymac Ace	Chris Allsopp	4-1	26.95	4
3rd	Mario Gomez	James Fenwick	10-1	27.14	6
4th	Fear Zafonic	Charlie Lister OBE	5-2	27.26	3
5th	Lyreen Mover	Gabor Tenczel	6-4f	27.28	1
6th	Romeo Reason	Liz McNair	7-1	27.68	2

Betfair East Anglian Derby, Yarmouth (16 Sep, 462m, £17,000)
Pos	Name of Greyhound	Trainer	SP	Time	Trap
1st	Fear Zafonic	Charlie Lister OBE	1-3f	27.46	3
2nd	Ocean Star	Hazel Kemp	25-1	27.91	6
3rd	Ten Large Down	Diane Henry	7-1	27.97	4
4th	Chicago Prince	David Pruhs	14-1	28.04	5
5th	Roo Come On	Liz McNair	11-2	28.16	1
6th	Guinness Time	Seamus Cahill	10-1	28.17	2

Stan James Laurels, Belle Vue (5 Oct, 470m, £6,000)
Pos	Name of Greyhound	Trainer	SP	Time	Trap
1st	Elwick Chris	Michael Walsh	3-1	27.50	3
2nd	November Weather	Otto Kueres	8-1	27.72	6
3rd	Yahoo Jamie	Charlie Lister OBE	3-1	27.78	5
4th	Bucks Yahoo	Chris Lund	5-2f	28.02	2
5th	Hello Dino	Paddy Curtin (UK)	8-1	28.04	4
6th	Magna Buddy	Jimmy Wright	3-1	28.56	1

William Hill St Leger, Wimbledon (26 Oct, 687m, £8,000)
Pos	Name of Greyhound	Trainer	SP	Time	Trap
1st	Droopys Bradley	Paul Donovan	1-2f	41.48+	1
2nd	Bower Hawk	Pat Rosney	12-1	41.87	3
3rd	He Went Whoosh	Claude Gardiner	6-1	41.91	5
4th	Shaws Dilemma	Liz McNair	6-1	42.07	4
5th	Blonde Blitz	Tony Collett	12-1	42.17	6
6th	Razzmatazz	Nathan McDonald	33-1	42.18	2

+ Track record

William Hill Oaks, Wimbledon (8 Dec, 480m, £6,000)
Pos	Name of Greyhound	Trainer	SP	Time	Trap
1st	Freedom Emma	Richard Yeates	5-2	28.40	5
2nd	Snowy Skye	Paul Garland	10-1	28.90	3
3rd	Rebellious Queen	Pat Rosney	4-1	28.93	1
4th	Sylvanna Crystal	Bernie Doyle	8-1	29.09	6
5th	Shaws Dilemma	Liz McNair	6-4f	29.10	2
6th	Big Pair	George Andreas	16-1	29.16	4

=== Principal Irish finals ===
College Causeway/Killahan Phanter Easter Cup, Shelbourne (17 Apr, 550y, €20,000)
Pos	Name of Greyhound	Trainer	SP	Time	Trap
1st	Thurlesbeg Joker	Owen McKenna	6-4f	29.55	2
2nd	Toomaline Jack	Dolores Ruth	5-2	29.62	3
3rd	Tyrur Chris	PJ Fahy	6-1	29.97	1
4th	Shaneboy Lee	Denis Kiely	7-1	30.04	5
5th	Faypoint Man	Owen McKenna	8-1	30.11	6
6th	Olympic Double	Pat Buckley	16-1	30.13	4

Red Mills Produce, Clonmel (2 May, 525y, €25,000)
Pos	Name of Greyhound	Trainer	SP	Time	Trap
1st	Faypoint Dave	Owen McKenna	5-2	28.64	4
2nd	Valais Mover	Declan Byrne	7-1	28.81	5
3rd	Bockos Boozer	Beverley Lochead	5-2	28.82	1
4th	Local Flawless	Dolores Ruth	10-1	29.00	2
5th	Thorn Brae Brett	Aidan Robinson	7-4f	29.03	3
6th	Droopys Lennon	Nicola Downes	8-1	29.14	6

Sporting Press Oaks, Shelbourne (26 Jun, 525y, €21,000)
Pos	Name of Greyhound	Trainer	SP	Time	Trap
1st	Dalcash Dvinsky	Jack Meade	9-4f	28.41	4
2nd	Skywalker Queen	Frances O'Donnell	7-2	28.43	6
3rd	Clearview Kelly	Michael Frayne	5-1	28.50	5
4th	Shelbourne Dawn	Brian King	4-1	28.85	3
5th	Razldazl Alice	Dolores Ruth	4-1	28.95	2
6th	Casual Steps	Reggie Roberts	14-1	28.98	1

Townviewfoods.com Champion Stakes, Shelbourne (24 Jul, 550y, €20,000)
Pos	Name of Greyhound	Trainer	SP	Time	Trap
1st	Makeshift	Dolores Ruth	5-2jf	29.90	3
2nd	Tyrur Big Mike	Conor Fahy	5-2jf	29.92	6
3rd	Farley Blitz	Owen McKenna	4-1	29.97	2
4th	Mesedo Blue	Seamus Graham	4-1	30.04	4
5th	Fatboyz Tyson	Pat Gordon	5-1	30.08	5
6th	Sevenheads Bay	Graham Holland	8-1	30.10	1

HX Bookmakers Puppy Derby, Harolds Cross (8 Oct, 525y, €25,000)
Pos	Name of Greyhound	Trainer	SP	Time	Trap
1st	Melodys Royal	Pa Fitzgerald	8-1	28.78	6
2nd	Dream Walker	Tom O'Neill	6-1	28.85	1
3rd	Mill Bling Bling	Frances Gleeson	8-1	28.90	4
4th	Lolos Joe	John McGee Sr.	1-1f	29.04	3
5th	Kerrydale Lar	Brian McCann	9-4	29.11	5
6th	Kielduff Merc	Marie Shanahan	33-1	29.13	2

Pat Hennerty Sales Laurels, Cork (16 Oct, 525y, €35,000)
Pos	Name of Greyhound	Trainer	SP	Time	Trap
1st	Tyrur Enda	Conor Fahy	4-6f	28.72	2
2nd	Tubbertelly Dubh	Owen McKenna	7-4	28.77	1
3rd	Kiowa Myth	Mossie O'Connor	10-1	29.12	3
4th	Took The Okee	James O'Donnell	25-1	29.23	5
5th	Huckabees Kid	William Kelleher	12-1	29.37	4
6th	Kid Billzer	Seamus Shealy	20-1	29.58	6

Kerry Agribusiness Irish St Leger, Limerick (18 Dec, 550y, €25,000)
Pos	Name of Greyhound	Trainer	SP	Time	Trap
1st	Farley Turbo	Owen McKenna	3-1	29.57+	4
2nd	Hare Mack	Robert Gleeson	4-1	30.09	6
3rd	Judicial Academy	Michael O’Donovan	5-2jf	30.44	5
4th	Westmead Bolt	Fraser Black	5-1	30.55	2
5th	Beaming Dilemma	Pat Buckley	5-2jf	30.62	1
6th	Nicken Shaw	Ken Duce	8-1	30.63	3

+ Track record
