= 2019 Irish Greyhound Derby =

2019 Boylesports Irish Greyhound Derby
- Lenson Bocko after winning the final
- Location: Shelbourne Park
- Start date: Friday 16 August
- End date: Saturday 21 September
- Competitors: 156
- Total prize money: €300,000 (winner €140,000)

The 2019 Boylesports Irish Greyhound Derby took place during August and September, with the final being held on 21 September at Shelbourne Park. The winner was the Graham Holland trained Lenson Bocko. The brindle dog owned by the Lochead-Ponder-Whelan syndicate (Graham Box, Austin Whelan and Len Ponder) won the first prize of €140,000. The final was considered to have been one of the best in the history of the competition with three greyhounds involved in a photo finish. The winning breeder was Patrick Collins.

The competition was sponsored by BoyleSports and the prize money purse was €300,000, of which €140,000 went to the winner.

Dual 2019 English Greyhound Derby and 2018 Irish Greyhound Derby finalists Magical Bale and Clonbrien Prince were early ante-post favourites along with Jaytee Taylor but newcomers Killmacdonagh, Lenson Bocko (late Melodys Dido) and Ballymac Cooper all gained support with the latter topping the list at 12–1. Disappointingly both Priceless Blake and Skywalker Logan missed the event and there was a complete lack of entries from England.

== Final result ==
At Shelbourne Park (over 550 yards):

Position	Greyhound	Breeding	Trap	Sectional	SP	Time	Trainer
1st	Lenson Bocko	Droopys Jet - Melodys Diamond	5	3.41	4-5f	29.40	Graham Holland
2nd	Boylesports King	Makeshift - Razldazl Pru	6	3.50	9-1	29.42	Dolores Ruth
3rd	Run Happy	Tullymurry Act - Marlfield Taylor	2	3.40	7-1	29.43	Pat Buckley
4th	Killmacdonagh	Zero Ten - Deercrest Lady	1	3.51	3-1	29.81	Kieran Lynch
5th	Mucky Brae	Kinloch Brae - Carmac Cyrus	3	3.38	5-1	30.34	Michael J O'Donovan
N/R	Our Surprise	Tullymurry Act - Corduff Flame	4				Laurence Jones

=== Distances ===
neck, head, 5½, 5 (lengths) 0.07 sec = one length

== Quarter finals ==
Heat 1 (Sep 7)
Pos	Name	SP	Time
1st	Lenson Bocko	4-5f	29.27
2nd	Run Happy	4-1	29.79
3rd	Deadly Dynamite	10-1	29.80
4th	Highview Micro	16-1	29.98
5th	Dromrich Altair	33-1	30.15
6th	Grangeview Ten	9-4	30.54

Heat 2 (Sep 7)
Pos	Name	SP	Time
1st	Sophies Man	6-1	29.45
2nd	Boylesports King	5-2	29.59
3rd	Mucky Brae	2-1	29.73
4th	Ballymac Copper	6-4f	29.75
5th	Knight Rocker	20-1	29.76
N/R	Jumeirah Buddy		

Heat 3 (Sep 7)
Pos	Name	SP	Time
1st	Magical Bale	5-4f	29.35
2nd	Ballydoyle Valor	16-1	29.40
3rd	Killmacdonagh	2-1	29.58
4th	Droopys Pension	6-1	29.65
5th	Cabra Firmino	14-1	29.79
6th	Slippy Cian	7-2	29.89

Heat 4 (Sep 7)
Pos	Name	SP	Time
1st	Murts Boher	6-1	29.61
2nd	Our Surprise	9-2	29.66
3rd	Music Toour Ears	2-1jf	29.80
4th	Lenson Blinder	2-1jf	29.81
5th	Toolmaker Daddy	12-1	29.92
6th	Cash Is King	9-1	30.13

== Semi finals ==
First Semi-final (Sep 14)
Pos	Name of Greyhound	SP	Time	Trainer
1st	Lenson Bocko	4-7f	29.32	Graham Holland
2nd	Run Happy	7-1	29.56	Pat Buckley
3rd	Boylesports King	6-1	29.74	Dolores Ruth
4th	Deadly Dynamite	10-1	29.76	Karol Ramsbottom
5th	Sophies Man	7-1	29.90	Peter Cronin
6th	Murts Boher	8-1	30.00	Graham Holland

Second Semi-final (Sep 14)
Pos	Name of Greyhound	SP	Time	Trainer
1st	Mucky Brae (DH)	6-1	29.32	Michael J O'Donovan
1st	Our Surprise (DH)	5-1	29.32	Laurence Jones
3rd	Killmacdonagh	2-1	29.63	Kieran Lynch
4th	Ballydoyle Valor	8-1	29.64	Graham Holland
5th	Magical Bale	7-4f	29.92	Patrick Guilfoyle
6th	Music Toour Ears	10-1	30.45	Patrick Guilfoyle

== Competition report ==
The first night of the first round provided several shock eliminations starting with Easter Cup champion Clona Blaze in the very first heat. Clonbrien Prince and Burgess Bucks and also crashed out and Ballymac Cooper and Ballymac Arminta also lost on the night but progressed. Jaytee Taylor and defending champion Ballyanne Sim both ran well to reach round two. The following night saw Wolfe win the first race in a sensational 29.22 and then Kilmacdonagh won in 29.36. Magical Bale and Lenson Bocko sealed their first wins but Lenson Blinder had to settle for a runner-up spot.

The second round started just like the first round with another high-profile elimination when Ballymac Arminta crashed out. Slippy Cian and Lenson Blinder both won their races while Wolfe and Ballyanne Sim progressed despite defeats. Heats 9-16 got underway the following evening (Aug 24) and Totos Park won before a sensational heat 11 saw all three major Derby contenders progress; Kilmacdonagh impressed when beating Magical Bale and Lenson Bocko. Produce champion Grangeview Ten claimed an unusual three dog heat and finally Jaytee Taylor secured a second-place finish and Ballymac Cooper won his heat to see all the big names through on the night.

The third round was held on the 31 August and Lenson Bocko claimed the first heat in a very fast time of 29.27; Jaytee Taylor found trouble and failed to qualify. Slippy Cian took heat 2 before the John Linehan trained Droopys Pension won heat 3 to remain unbeaten. In the next heat Murts Boher surprised at 10-1 beating Lenson Blinder into second place with Droopys Hunch and Totos Park going no further. Heat 5 was mayhem and Grangeview Ten won the race with Wolfe knocked over and eliminated, the stewards failed to stop the race despite a greyhound turning and passing the hare in the wrong direction, luckily no greyhound was injured. Killmacdonagh and Ballymac Copper battled in heat 6 with the fawn bitch coming out on top by a head, Magical Bale bounced back top form with a win in heat 7 and finally Mucky Brae won heat 8 which saw the end of the challenge of defending champion Ballyanne Sim.

One week later the quarter-finals took place and in heat 1 Lenson Bocko posted an impressive 29.27 and propelled himself forward as the new favourite, the brindle dog had also recorded 29.27 in the previous round but this time he beat the field by seven and a half lengths, Run Happy and Deadly Dynamite took the two distant qualifying places with Grangeview Ten last. Heat 2 saw the surprise elimination of Ballymac Copper who ran under par, Sophies Man took the race followed by Boylesports King and Mucky Brae. Magical Bale's class showed once again as he won heat 3 from Ballydoyle Valor and the previously undefeated Killmacdonagh in a very strong race that also saw the end of the challenge from Droopys Pension and Slippy Cian. The final heat was won by Murts Boher from Our Surprise and Music Tooour Ears but Lenson Blinder was eliminated.

In the semi-finals Lenson Bocko consolidated his tag as favourite when winning all the way in heat 1 from the consistent Run Happy with Boylesports King taking the final qualification place. A rare dead-heat in the second heat between Mucky Brae and Our Surprise meant that three greyhounds qualified for the final with a time of 29.32sec because the first heat had also been won in that time. The last to take a place in the final was the dangerous Killmacdonagh who looked so strong in the early part of the competition and with a trap 1 draw in the final looked a real danger to Lenson Bocko; Magical Bale finished fifth and failed to make it through.

The final was a five dog heat following the withdrawal of Our Surprise and as the traps rose it was Mucky Brae that broke best but Run Happy and Lenson Bocko were both gaining ground on the run up to the first bend. Run Happy took the lead on the rails as Mucky Brae and Lenson Bocko impeded each other with latter better placed in second place as they came out of the second bend. Poor starts by Killmacdonagh and Boylesports King left them trailing the leading trio on the back straight. Mucky Brae began to fade by the third bend leaving Killmacdonagh no path to contest and by the third Lenson Bocko was challenging Run Happy sitting about a length behind. As they turned for the home straight it looked like two-way battle for the line but Boylesports King was finishing strongly and was also gaining with every stride. Just a few yards from the finish Lenson Bocko finally reeled in the long time leader and won by a neck, the line came too early for Boylesports King who would have won if the distance had been five yards longer.

== See also ==
- 2019 UK & Ireland Greyhound Racing Year
