= 2015 UK & Ireland Greyhound Racing Year =

2015 UK & Ireland Greyhound Racing Year was the 90th year of greyhound racing in the United Kingdom and the 89th year of greyhound racing in Ireland.

== Summary ==
Trainer Kevin Hutton secured a last race success with El Pedro that helped him lift his first Trainers Championship. The English Greyhound Derby attracted 273 entries and was won by Rio Quattro while the Irish equivalent was won by Ballymac Matt.

Barry Faulkner the Chief Executive of the Greyhound Board of Great Britain who explained that the projected budget from the bookmakers for the fund for the year would be well below £7 million. This meant that it was over 40% lower than 2008 and the seventh consecutive annual decrease was blamed on reduced betting shop greyhound turnover. Online streaming of BAGS (Bookmakers’ Afternoon Greyhound Service) racing started via SIS and Mediastream was announced by BAGS chairman Dominic Ford as a possible new revenue source that could benefit the industry.

Two trainers George Andreas and Tony Collett switched back to Sittingbourne from Wimbledon and Patsy Cusack handed over his licence to head man Mark Fenwick. Former Racing Manager Jim Layton and trainer Henry Chalkley both died. At Wimbledon the Merton Council passed the AFC Wimbledon plans for a new football stadium meaning that help was now required from London mayor Boris Johnson. The GRA lease ended in July, which brought the end of greyhound racing in London ever nearer.

The year ended with Towcester's team manager Andy Lisemore steering the track to the BAGS/SIS Championship after winning the final at Perry Barr. Swift Hoffman was named Greyhound of the Year and Mark Wallis picked up the champion trainer accolade and in the process equalled the record of seven set by John 'Ginger' McGee Sr.

== Roll of honour ==
Major Winners
Award	Name of Winner
2015 English Greyhound Derby	Rio Quattro
2015 Irish Greyhound Derby	Ballymac Matt
Greyhound Trainer of the Year	Mark Wallis (Towcester)
Greyhound of the Year	Swift Hoffman
Irish Greyhound of the Year	Ballymac Matt

GTA Chelsea Glass Trainers Championship, Sittingbourne (23 March)
Pos	Name of Trainer	Points
1st	Kevin Hutton	53
2nd	Mark Wallis	46
3rd	Seamus Cahill	38
4th	Paul Young	32
5th	John Mullins	29
6th	Dean Childs	26

BAGS/SIS Track Championship, Perry Barr (23 December)
Pos	Track	Points
1st	Towcester	67
2nd	Newcastle	57
3rd	Hall Green	51
4th	Belle Vue	37
5th	Romford	37
6th	Monmore	31

=== Principal UK finals ===
Ladbrokes Golden Jacket, Crayford (24 February, 714m, £17,500)
Pos	Name of Greyhound	Trap	SP	Time	Trainer
1st	Wiki Waki Woo	4	6-1	44.99	Angie Kibble
2nd	Bubbly Time	3	5-1	45.07	Tony Gifkins
3rd	Racenight Jenny	1	1-1f	45.41	Tony Collett
4th	Black Francis	2	5-1	45.42	Mark Wallis
5th	Millwards Amy	5	20-1	45.60	Paul Young
6th	Malls Pride	6	8-1	45.86	Paul Young

Racing Post Scottish Derby, Shawfield (12 April, 480m, £20,000)
Pos	Name of Greyhound	Trap	SP	Time	Trainer
1st	Swift Hoffman	6	6-4f	28.98	Pat Rosney
2nd	Cashen Maureen	5	10-1	29.24	June McCombe
3rd	Coolavanny Jap	1	7-2	29.58	Pat Buckley
4th	Lenson Sanchez	3	6-1	29.66	Pat Buckley
5th	La Cuchilla	2	3-1	29.74	Steve Race
6th	Save The Don	4	7-1	00.00	Fraser Black

William Hill Classic, Sunderland (15 July, 450m, £25,000)
Pos	Name of Greyhound	Trap	SP	Time	Trainer
1st	No But	2	5-2	27.00	Julie Calvert
2nd	Pinpoint Finas	1	7-2	27.07	Kelly Macari
3rd	Bubbly Ninja	3	5-1	27.14	Paul Young
4th	Conna Trigger	6	2-1f	27.37	Kelly Macari
5th	Jolly Tricks	4	7-2	27.42	Kevin Hutton
N/R	Laughing Gravy	5		Lame	David Pruhs

William Hill Grand Prix, Sunderland (15 July, 640m, £15,000)
Pos	Name of Greyhound	Trap	SP	Time	Trainer
1st	Bubbly Gold	1	4-1	39.79	Paul Young
2nd	Dinzeo	5	7-2	39.84	Harry Crapper
3rd	Farley Rio	4	5-2	39.86	Kevin Boon
4th	Toottoottootsie	6	6-4f	39.97	Paul Prior
5th	Teejays Panther	2	4-1	39.98	Paul Young
N/R	Jaytee China	3		Lame	Paul Young

Colossus Bets TV Trophy, Towcester (18 August, 906m, £8,000)
Pos	Name of Greyhound	Trap	SP	Time	Trainer
1st	Ballymac Bonnie	4	2-1jf	55.44	Liam Dowling
2nd	Bubbly Time	1	9-2	55.72	Tony Gifkins
3rd	Ribble Atom	2	5-1	55.80	Mark Wallis
4th	Droopys Cottage	5	2-1jf	55.86	Dean Childs
5th	Droopys Tamera	6	8-1	55.95	Dean Childs
6th	Alma Prince	3	20-1	56.00	Alec Stone

Totepool 69th East Anglian Derby, Yarmouth (16 September, 462m, £15,000)
Pos	Name of Greyhound	Trap	SP	Time	Trainer
1st	Do It For Twiggy	1	13-8f	27.82	Erica Samuels
2nd	Southfield Jock	4	3-1	27.88	Seamus Cahill
3rd	Calco Flyer	3	9-2	28.01	Mark Wallis
4th	Urban Road	5	20-1	28.06	Ray Pleasants
5th	Farloe Brae	2	20-1	28.26	Richard Devenish
6th	Ballymac Brogan	6	2-1	28.32	Seamus Cahill

Chelsea Glass Grand National, Sittingbourne (6 October, 480mH, £8,000)
Pos	Name of Greyhound	Trap	SP	Time	Trainer
1st	Mo's Bullet	4	7-1	29.80	Ricky Holloway
2nd	Julius George	1	7-2	29.82	Tony Taylor
3rd	Soviet Jackson	6	7-4f	29.89	John Mullins
4th	Bizarro	2	20-1	29.99	Tony Taylor
5th	Affane Duke	3	6-1	30.12	Tony Taylor
6th	Castlelyons Cofi	5	5-2	30.51	Tony Taylor

William Hill St Leger, Wimbledon (10 November, 687m, £25,000)
Pos	Name of Greyhound	Trap	SP	Time	Trainer
1st	Fizzypop Buddy	3	9-2	41.49	June Harvey
2nd	Droopys Tamera	5	10-1	41.88	Dean Childs
3rd	Roxholme Dream	2	7-2	41.99	Hayley Keightley
4th	Teejayspowerhawk	1	16-1	42.06	Paul Young
5th	Ferryforth Fran	6	33-1	42.31	Mark Wallis
6th	Diego Flight	4	8-11f	42.45	Liz McNair

ECC Timber Oaks, Belle Vue (9 December, 470m, £15,000)
Pos	Name of Greyhound	Trap	SP	Time	Trainer
1st	Domino Storm	3	5-2	27.59	Mark Wallis
2nd	Evanta Evita	5	5-1	27.85	Mark Wallis
3rd	Bromwich Sue	1	12-1	27.93	Lynn Cook
4th	Tyrur Caroline	2	1-1f	28.06	Charlie Lister OBE
5th	Roxholme Hottie	4	6-1	28.17	Hayley Keightley
6th	Newinn This Way	6	20-1	28.24	Carla Hendy

ECC Timber Laurels, Belle Vue (9 December, 470m, £6,000)
Pos	Name of Greyhound	Trap	SP	Time	Trainer
1st	Millwards Whitey	3	6-4f	27.87	Dean Childs
2nd	Taranis Bolt	6	3-1	28.01	Kevin Hutton
3rd	On Alert	4	3-1	28.18	Hayley Keightley
4th	Blakes Turbo	2	12-1	28.55	Geraldine Kovac
5th	Rock Me Kewell	5	16-1	28.62	Michael Hurst
6th	Ballymac Ricky	1	9-2	28.68	Leonard O'Hanlon

=== Principal Irish finals ===
Dandelion Bar & Nightclub Easter Cup, Shelbourne (21 March, 550y, €25,000)
Pos	Name of Greyhound	Trap	SP	Time	Trainer
1st	Sidarian Blaze	2	6-4	29.52	Graham Holland
2nd	Slippery Fred	1	5-4f	29.59	Larry Dunne
3rd	Coran Sky	3	5-1	29.83	Graham Holland
4th	Gaytime Hawk	4	16-4?	29.85	Graham Holland
5th	Highview Premier	6	14-1	29.96	Gerry Merriman
6th	Laughil Duke	5	10-1	30.13	Patrick Guilfoyle

Con & Anne Kirby Memorial Stakes, Limerick (4 April, 525y, €80,000)
Pos	Name of Greyhound	Trap	SP	Time	Trainer
1st	Cable Bay	4	6-1	28.11	Brendan Matthews
2nd	Rural Hawaii	6	5-4f	28.25	Graham Holland
3rd	Country Legend	1	4-1	28.39	Maurice Heffernan
4th	Droopys Braedon	3	5-2	28.40	Sharlene Higgins
5th	Ivy Hill Bart	5	10-1	28.71	Noel Hehir
6th	Beaming Boost	2	5-1	28.82	Pat Buckley

Irish Independent Laurels, Cork (9 May, 525y, €30,000)
Pos	Name of Greyhound	Trap	SP	Time	Trainer
1st	Midtown Raffa	2	2-1f	28.31	Maurice O’Connor
2nd	Burgess Rumble	5	7-1	28.69	Sheila Spillane
3rd	Mimis Ace	6	5-1	28.70	John Kiely
4th	Drive On Royal	4	7-2	28.84	Thomas O’Donovan
5th	Skywalker Echo	1	8-1	29.16	Frances O’Donnell
6th	Knocktoo Garry	3	5-2	29.17	Neilus O’Connell

B.I.F National Produce, Clonmel (14 June, 525y, €30,000)
Pos	Name of Greyhound	Trap	SP	Time	Trainer
1st	Ballybough Mondo	2	3-1	28.55	Murt Leahy
2nd	Amazing Dude	1	1-2f	28.65	Graham Holland
3rd	Haughty Slippers	5	7-1	28.69	Frank Clune
4th	Justice Matters	3	8-1	28.83	Jerry Griffin
5th	Maggies Lucy	6	7-1	28.90	James Robinson
6th	Ballybough Mike	4	5-2	29.11	Murt Leahy

Sporting Press Oaks, Shelbourne (20 June, 525y, €25,000)
Pos	Name of Greyhound	Trap	SP	Time	Trainer
1st	Ballydoyle Honey	1	1-5f	28.47	Graham Holland
2nd	Hovex Princess	5	8-1	28.52	Graham Holland
3rd	Ravenswood Emily	2	14-1	28.70	Gerard Barber
4th	Awaywitdepixies	6	20-1	28.77	Paul Hennessy
5th	Piercestown Lucy	3	8-1	28.87	Thomas Coleman
N/R	Jumeirah Dancer	4			Jimmy Buckley

Doire Construction Champion Stakes, Shelbourne (25 July, 550y, €15,000)
Pos	Name of Greyhound	Trap	SP	Time	Trainer
1st	Sidarian Vega	1	2-1jf	29.64	Graham Holland
2nd	Budgie Bypass	6	8-1	29.81	Paul Hennessy
3rd	Paradise Maverick	4	4-1	29.87	Pat Buckley
4th	Riverside Pat	2	6-1	30.04	Graham Holland
5th	Barefoot Artist	5	14-1	30.64	Paul Hennessy
6th	Midtown Raffa	3	2-1jf	30.85	Maurice O’Connor

Dublin Coach Puppy Derby, Harolds Cross (16 October, 525y, €22,500)
Pos	Name of Greyhound	Trap	SP	Time	Trainer
1st	Anopheles	3	10-1	28.54	Liam Dowling
2nd	Hee Haws Sheriff	1	2-1	28.57	Ian Reilly
3rd	Jaytee Dutch	6	4-5f	28.58	Paul Hennessy
4th	Black Alder	2	6-1	28.76	Peter Comerford
5th	Trade Freddie	4	7-1	28.81	John Touhy
6th	Skywalker Archie	5	14-1	28.99	Patrick Guilfoyle

Kerry Agribusiness Irish St Leger, Limerick (31 October, 550y, €25,000)
Pos	Name of Greyhound	Trap	SP	Time	Trainer
1st	Skywalker Rory	6	7-2	29.47	Patrick Guilfoyle
2nd	Sidarian Vega	4	6-1	29.89	Graham Holland
3rd	Offshore Bound	1	2-1jf	30.31	Owen McKenna
4th	Jaytee Valencia	2	6-1	30.59	Paul Hennessy
5th	Peregrine Falcon	3	2-1jf	30.69	Patrick O'Brien
6th	Tyrur Tommy	5	7-2	00.00	PJ Fahy
