= Laurels (Irish greyhound race) =

Irish greyhound racing competition

Irish Laurels
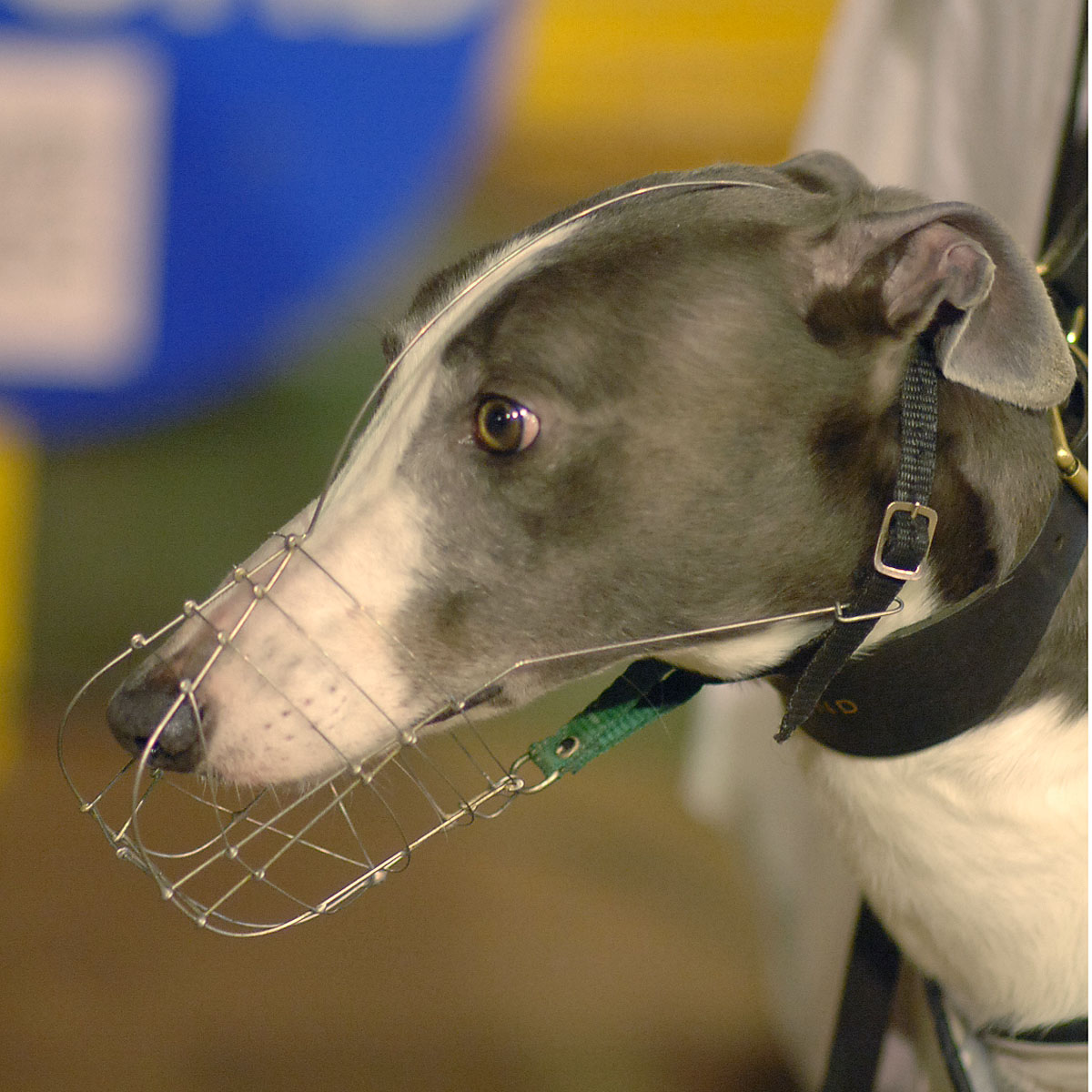
- 2005 finalist Vancouver Sparky
- Class: Feature
- Location: Curraheen Park
- Inaugurated: 1944
- Sponsor: Bar One Racing

Race information
- Distance: 525 yards
- Surface: Sand
- Purse: €30,000 (winner)

The Laurels is a greyhound racing competition held annually at Curraheen Park Greyhound Stadium located in Bishopstown, west of Cork, County Cork, Ireland.

It was hosted by the old Cork Greyhound Stadium from 1944 to 1999 but inevitably continued to be held at the new track after it opened.

It is a prestigious event targeted by many of Ireland's leading greyhounds and is an integral part of the Irish greyhound racing calendar.

Clonbrien Hero, trained by Graham Holland and owned by Ms. Kay Murphy of Athlacca, County Limerick set a new record for the final of the Laurels (at Curraheen Park) when he won by three lengths in a time of 28.00 on 22 July 2017.

== Venues and distances ==
- 1944–1960 (Cork, Western Road, 500 yards)
- 1961–1999 (Cork, Western Road, 525 yards)
- 2000–present (Cork, Curraheen Park, 525 yards)

== Sponsors ==
- 1979–1981 (Cashmans)
- 1985–1986 (Joe Donnelly)
- 1987–1991 (Kantoher Co-op)
- 1992–1992 (Michael McCarthy)
- 1993–1994 (Michael Crowley)
- 1995–2003 (Co-op Superstores)
- 2004–2009 (Cashmans Bookmakers)
- 2010–2011 (Pat Hennerty Sales)
- 2012–2014 (Connolly's Red Mills)
- 2015–2019 (Irish Independent)
- 2023–2025 (Bar One Racing)

== Past winners ==
Year	Winner	Breeding	Time (Sec)	Trainer	SP	Notes
1944	Robeen Printer	Printer – Deoc Deireannach	28.98			
1945	Munster Hotel	Highland Rum – Ballinspittle	29.20			
1946	Ballinrea Express	Rebel Express – Champion Queen	28.80			
1947	Careless Border	Ruby Border – Volcut	28.80			
1948	Double Shadow	Dark Shadow – Grosvenors Lady	28.33			
1949	Spanish Chestnut	Rebel Abbey – Cordal Moonlight	28.55			
1950	Spanish Chestnut	Rebel Abbey – Cordal Moonlight	28.70			
1951	Knockrour Favourite	Bellas Prince – Favourite Tip	28.85	Jack Lynch		
1952	Tragumna Dasher	Dark Shadow – Bran Cream	28.70			
1953	Templenoe Rebel	Ballymac Ball – Templenoe Medora	28.55			
1954	Come on Bella	Lucky Tanist – Knockrour Bella	28.90			
1955	Spanish Battleship	Spanish Chestnut – Ballyseedy Memory	28.35	Tom Lynch		
1956	Rather Grand	The Grand Champion – Ashbrook Gift	29.00		7-1	
1957	Kilcasey Streak		28.80			
1958	Brook Prancer	Glittering Look – Shaggy Dancer	28.43			
1959	Celbridge Chance	Eridanus – Avril	28.50			
1960	Last Lap	The Grand Champion – Dooniskey Lass	28.15			
1961	Round Tower Rose	Champion Prince – Knockdrina Rose	29.80			
1962	Dark Baby	Knockrour Again – Ronnoc Miss	29.40			Track record
1963	Powerstown Proper	Hi There – Faoide	29.75			
1964	Tanyard Heather	Oregon Prince – Clonbanin Chariot	29.20	P Cashman		
1965	Boro Parachute	Crazy Parachute – Anjone	29.60			
1966	Westpark Ash	Hi There – Westpark Ballet	29.40			
1967	Philotimo	Booked Out – Pride of Corrin	29.65	C Kelleher		
1968	Flaming King	Market Green – Maglin Lady	29.25	S Moran		
1969	Skipping Tim	Myross Again – Right On Time	29.50	Dave Cashman		
1970	Gabriel Boy	Yanka Boy – Gabriel Star	29.25	Ger McKenna		
1971	Ivy Hall Flash	Proud Lincoln – Ivy Hall Rose	29.15	Paddy Keane		
1972	Dublin Eily	Maryville Hi – Right Champion	29.70	J Buckley		
1973	Kilbracken Style	Kilbelin Style – Maggie Ann	29.10	Paddy Keane		
1974	Silent Thought	Ivy Hall Flash – Oulartwick Jane	29.50	Paddy Keane	2/1	
1975	Moonshine Bandit	Yanka Boy – Westpark Roma	29.30	Christy O'Callaghan		
1976	Nameless Star	Ritas Choice – Itsastar	29.30	Ger McKenna		
1977	Ashleigh Honour	Kudas Honour – Miss Ashleigh	29.15	Dave Cashman		
1978	Knockrour Girl	Bright Lad – Knockrour Last	29.40	Denis Lynch		
1979	Knockrour Slave	Sole Aim – Knockrour Exile	29.45	Ger McKenna		
1980	Knockrour Slave	Sole Aim – Knockrour Exile	29.00	Ger McKenna		Track record
1981	Knockeen Master	Laurdella Fun – Knockeen Guest	29.50	Christy O'Callaghan		
1982	The Stranger	Dark Mercury – Lovely Blend	28.95	Christy O'Callaghan		Track record
1983	Back Garden	Knockrour Slave – Sweeping Billy	29.66	Ger McKenna		
1984	Rugged Mick	Ceili Band – Blueberry Pet	29.09	Ger McKenna	5/4f	
1985	Follow A Star	Under Par – Float A Loan	29.42	Ger McKenna	10/1	
1986	Big Oran	Oran Jack – Big Deposit	29.78	Ann Wade	3/1	
1987	Yellow Bud	Yellow Ese – Budweiser	29.28	Donal O'Regan	10/1	
1988	Odell King	Sail On II – Odell Tansy	28.98	Ned Power	7/2	
1989	Airmount Grand	Daleys Gold – Airmount Jewel	28.82	Gerald Kiely	4/7f	Track record in final, sf and 2nd Rd
1990	Adraville Bridge	Im Slippy – Milltown Gem	28.78	Mossy O'Connor	9/4jf	Track record
1991	Terrydrum Tico	Tico – Gentle Sarah	28.86	Davy Lennon	2/1f	
1992	Market Rascal	Coral Town – Twins Petra	29.58			
1993	Lisglass Lass	Quare Rocket – Machern	28.97	Francie Murray		
1994	Clounmellane Oak	Ravage Again – Rosehip Joy	29.44	John Lynch	6/1	
1995	Standard Image	Murlens Slippy – Simply Elite	29.04	Christy O'Callaghan	5/1	
1996	Deerfield Bypass	Daleys Gold – Black Adraville	29.12	Ger McKenna	7/2	
1997	Mr Pickwick	Trade Union – Terrys Whisper	29.16	Paul Hennessy	1/2f	
1998	Mr Pickwick	Trade Union – Terrys Whisper	29.29	Paul Hennessy	4/5f	
1999	Lumber Boss	Batties Rocket – The Other Joy	29.42	Frances O'Donnell	5/1	dead-heat
1999	Tigers Eye	Coalbrook Tiger – Swift Comment	29.42	Nicky Turner	10/1	dead-heat
2000	Barefoot Ridge	Some Picture – Cailin Dilis	28.69	Paul Hennessy	6/1	
2001	Sonic Flight	Frightful Flash – Westmead Flight	28.41	Dolores Ruth	4/1	
2002	Annual Award	Smooth Rumble – Heres Steppie	28.33	Eddie Wade	7/1	
2003	Nikita Billie	Split the Bill – Nikita Doll	28.34	Jack Walsh	9/2	
2004	Boherduff Light	He Knows – Travelling Light	28.14	Owen McKenna	2/1jf	
2005	Tyrur Ted	Top Honcho – Watch the Market	28.33	PJ Fahy	4/6f	
2006	Ardkill Jamie	Top Savings – Fast Issue	28.35	Paul Hennessy	5/2	
2007	Catunda Harry	Elite State – Your So Vain	28.18	Owen McKenna	5/4f	
2008	Cashen Legend	Balintore Brave – Fergus Gold	28.74	Chris Houilhan	14/1	
2009	Sevenheads Bay	Ballymac Maeve – Travara Daisy	28.50	Graham Holland	4/1	
2010	Tyrur Enda	Razldazl Billy – Regards To Alice	28.42	PJ Fahy	4/6f	
2011	Razldazl Rioga	Brett Lee – Razldazl Pearl	28.32	Dolores Ruth	7/2	
2012	Knockglass Billy	Ballymac Maeve – Knockglass Lady	28.30	Graham Holland	2/1f	
2013	Lassa Expedition	Crash –Lassa Experience	28.39	Rachel Wheeler	3/1	
2014	Vimmerby	Winetavern Oscar – Wee Rose Garden	28.56	John Kavanagh	3/1	
2015	Midtown Raffa	Kinloch Brae – Raffa Baby	28.31	Maurice O'Connor	2/1f	
2016	Skywalker Manner	Leeview Jet – Jibberish	28.29	Graham Holland	5/1	
2017	Clonbrien Hero	Razldazl Jayfkay – Trout or Salmon	28.00	Graham Holland	5/2	Curraheen Park final record
2018	Rockybay Foley	Sparta Maestro – Ironically	28.37	Kieran Lynch	4/5f	
2019	Rockybay Foley	Sparta Maestro – Ironically	28.57	Kieran Lynch	7/4f	
2020	Runninta Seeya	Laughil Blake – Droopys Harbour	28.48	John Linehan	-	No SP due to COVID-19 pandemic restrictions
2021	One Time Only	Droopys Sydney – Mags Image	28.17	Thomas O'Donovan	3/1	
2022	Good Cody	Definate Opinion – Soho Ark	28.20	Patrick Guilfoyle	5/1	
2023	High Trend	Droopys Sydney – Beaming Smasher	28.31	Graham Holland	8/1	
2024	Crafty Shivoo	Droopys Sydney – Ballymac Sanjose	28.52	Patrick Norris	1/1f	
2025	Magical on Fire	Ballymac Cashout – Burgess Sarah	27.93	Patrick Guilfoyle	13/2	
