= Kirby Memorial Stakes =

Irish greyhound race

Con & Annie Kirby Memorial Stakes
- Class: Feature
- Location: Limerick Greyhound Stadium
- Inaugurated: 2013

Race information
- Distance: 525 yards
- Surface: Sand
- Qualification: Juveniles only (26 months old and younger)
- Purse: €80,000 (winner)

The Con & Annie Kirby Memorial Stakes is a greyhound racing competition held annually at Limerick Greyhound Stadium at Greenpark, Dock Road, Limerick, Ireland.

The competition quickly established itself as one of the leading feature events in the Irish racing calendar due to the significant prize money on offer.

It boasted a record €80,000 to the winner in 2014 making the competition one of the biggest prizes in greyhound racing and the richest juvenile race in the world. It was sponsored by J. P. McManus & Noreen McManus, and named in honour of Noreen McManus's parents, who had close ties with the old Limerick Markets Field Greyhound Stadium.

A series of trial stakes are run at different locations in preparation for the competition.

== Venues and distances ==
- 2013-present (Limerick 525y)

== Past winners ==
Year	Winner	Breeding	Time (sec)	Trainer	SP	Notes/ref
2013	Roxholme Bully	Shaneboy Lee – Roxholme Sue	28.65	Owen McKenna	11/8f	
2014	Boylesports Hero	Top Savings – Cabra Midget	28.31	Brendan Matthews	5/4f	
2015	Cable Bay	Foleys Folly – Toms Delight	28.11	Brendan Matthews	6/1	
2016	Droopys Roddick	Droopys Jet - Droopys Start	28.09	Pat Buckley	7/2	
2017	Bentekes Bocko	Tullymurry Act - Tullig Paula	28.39	Pat Buckley	2/1f	
2018	Droopys Davy	Droopys Nidge - Droopys Loner	28.10	Pat Buckley	4/5f	
2019	Toolmaker Josie	Pat C Sabbath – Lemon Bolt	28.37	Robert Gleeson	6/1	
2020	No race due to (COVID-19 pandemic)					
2021	Stonepark Leo	Ballymac Best – Adamant Gem	28.38	Mark O'Donovan	No SP	No SP due to COVID-19
2022	Swords Rex	Droopys Sydney – Starry Display	28.27	Graham Holland	9/4f	
2023	Clonbrien Treaty	Pestana – Clonbrien Millie	28.05	Graham Holland	5/2	
2024	Knockeen Dazzler	Laughil Blake – Love Island	28.10	Daniel O'Rahilly	5/2	
2025	Faypoint Ranger	Coolavanny Hoffa – Carefree Tipp	28.05	Graham Holland	4/6f	
