= Champion Stakes (Irish greyhound race) =

Irish greyhound racing competition

- Class: Feature
- Location: Shelbourne Park
- Inaugurated: 1979
- Sponsor: BoyleSports

Race information
- Distance: 550 yards
- Surface: Sand
- Purse: €20,000 (winner)

The Champion Stakes is a greyhound racing competition held annually at Shelbourne Park in Ringsend, Dublin, Ireland.

It is a prestigious competition in the Irish racing greyhound racing calendar and was inaugurated in 1979.

== Venues and distances ==
- 1979–1979 (Shelbourne 525y)
- 1980–1987 (Shelbourne 575y)
- 1988–present (Shelbourne 550y)

== Sponsors ==
- 1979–1987 (Respond)
- 1991–1995 (Febo)
- 1996–1996 (Cycle Ireland)
- 2005–2009 (BoyleSports)
- 2010–2013 (Townview Foods)
- 2014–2014 (Hamilton Architects)
- 2015–2016 (Doire Construction)
- 2017–present (BoyleSports)

== Past winners ==
Year	Winner	Breeding	Time (sec)	Trainer	SP	Ref
1979	Distant Clamour	Here's Sonny – In Gear	29.53	Pat Jones	5/1	
1980	Hurry On Bran	Brave Bran – Hurry on Hostess	32.39	Francie Murray	9/2	
1981	I'm Lovely	Limerick Echo – Kojane	32.02	John Hayes		
1982	Debbycott Lad	Liberty Lad – Knockshe Hopeful	32.24	Cyril Morris		
1983	Penny Sailor	Shamrock Sailor – Penny Farthing	32.23	Mary McGrath	6/1	
1984	Clayderman	Yellow Band – Queen of Moray	32.40	R Robert		
1985	Shanagarry Duke	Its Ballyhenry – Glenduff Castle	31.88	Mick Boyce		
1986	Master Mystery	Ballyheigue Moon – Susies Liberator	32.00	Ger McKenna	5/1	
1987	Manorville Major	Moral Support – Westmead City	31.98	Catherine Doran	5/1	
1988	Randy	Aulton Villa – Melanie	30.42	Christy Daly		
1989	Manorville Magic	Manorville Sand – Black Vision	30.34	Paddy Doran		
1990	Fly Cruiser	Moral Support – Lauragh Pride	30.35	Ann Power	2/1	
1991	Ardfert Mick	Ardfert Sean – Boher Rita	30.43	Matt O'Donnell	6/4f	
1992	Within The Law	Rathard Man – Valley Pride	30.64	x	9/1	
1993	Trade Union	Daleys Gold – Trade Gold	30.59	Paul Hennessy		
1994	Velvet Rocket	Manorville Sand – Sheer Velvet	30.39	Tony Fahy	7/1	
1995	Dew Reward	Phantom Flash – Highwood Mystery	30.61	Michael O'Donovan		
1996	Mountleader Peer	Tapwatcher – Mountleader Emer	30.58	Christy O'Callaghan	6/1	
1997	Airmount Rogue	Glen Park Dancer – Airmount Kelly	30.44	Gerald Kiely	6/1	
1998	Deep Decision	Slaneyside Hare – I Know You	30.31	Eddie Wade	4/5f	
1999	Mr Bozz	Cry Dalcash – Terrys Whisper	30.42	Paul Hennessy	9/1	
2000	Lemon Ralph	Slaneyside Hare – I Know You	30.08	Paul Hennessy	8/1	
2001	Droopys Kewell	Larkhill Jo – Perrys Pusher	30.07	Michael Dunphy	7/4jf	
2002	Longvalley Tina	Some Picture – Unlucky Lady	30.15	Paul Hennessy	8/1	
2003	World Class	Come On Ranger – Queen Survivor	30.50	Pat Buckley	16/1	
2004	Never Give Up	Spiral Nikita – Dalcash Lament	29.90	Pat Buckley	4/1	
2005	Droopys Maldini	Droopys Kewell – Little Diamond UK	29.43	Fraser Black	5/2	
2006	Large Mac	Jamella Prince – Roisins Becky	29.76	Liam Butler	7/1	
2007	Razldazl Billy	Brett Lee – Inky Black	29.72	Dolores Ruth	6/4f	
2008	Shelbourne Aston	Just The Best – Queen Survivor	29.71	Pat Curtin	10/1	
2009	Fatboyz Nodrog	Crash – Whitefort Pride	29.54	Pat Gordon	3/1jf	
2010	Makeshift	Razldazl Billy – Razldazl Pearl	29.90	Dolores Ruth	5/2jf	
2011	Uncle Eoin	Droopys Vieri – Dark Rose	29.81	James Robinson	6/1	
2012	Droopys Jet	Slip The Lark – Droopys Mo	29.46	Fraser Black	5/2jf	
2013	Paradise Madison	Head Bound – Paradise Alanna	29.46	Oliver Bray	6/4f	
2014	Ballymac Vic	Kinloch Brae – Ballymac Vicky	29.97	Liam Dowling	9/4	
2015	Sidarian Vega	Westmead Hawk – Manic Fantasy	29.64	Graham Holland	2/1jf	
2016	Clares Rocket	Confident Rankin – Lemon Madrid	29.29	Graham Holland	1/6f	
2017	Jaytee Yankee	Droopys Jet – Basket of Trumps	29.58	Paul Hennessy	7/1	
2018	Jaytee Yankee	Droopys Jet – Basket of Trumps	29.58	Paul Hennessy	4/1	
2019	Ballymac Arminta	Ballymac Best – Coolavanny Angie	29.31	Liam Dowling	4/5f	
2020	Pestana	Ballymac Best – Coolavanny Pet	29.57	Owen McKenna	6/1	
2021	De Machine	Droopys Cain – Precious Story	29.41	Brendan Matthews	11/2	
2022	One Time Only	Droopys Sydney – Mags Image	29.67	Thomas O'Donovan	3/1	
2023	Trinity Junior	Laughil Blake – Oi Oi Upenalty	29.34	Peter Cronin	5/2f	
2024	Daleroad Duke	Good News – Burgess Sarah	29.42	Patrick Guilfoyle	5/2jf	
2025	Seven Beach	Pestana – Whitings Gift	29.39	Jennifer O'Donnell	11/8f	
