= National Produce Stakes =

Irish greyhound competition

- Location: Clonmel Greyhound Stadium
- Inaugurated: 1939
- Sponsor: Kasko Petfood

Race information
- Distance: 525 yards
- Surface: Sand
- Purse: €20,000 (winner)

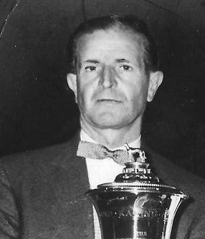
Paddy Dunphy, winning trainer in 1957 and 1964

The National Produce Stakes is a greyhound racing competition held annually at Clonmel Greyhound Stadium in Clonmel, County Tipperary, Ireland.

== Race history ==
It is a competition in the Irish racing greyhound racing calendar and was inaugurated in 1939. The event was held at Thurles Greyhound Stadium from 1999 to 2002.

== Venues and distances ==
- 1939–1988 (Clonmel 525y)
- 1999–2002 (Thurles 525y)
- 2003–present (Clonmel 525y)

== Past winners ==
Year	Winner	Breeding	Time (sec)	Trainer	SP	Notes/ref
1939	Sporting Fancy	Sporting Law – Onside	30.20			
1940	Landys Style	Dasher Lad – Sheevra More	30.30			
1941	Botleys Best	Quality Tells – Delightful Floss	29.95			
1943	Britannias Son	Tanist – Miss Britannia	30.30			
1944	Lottys Gay Boy	Lottys Luck – Black May Tell	30.35			
1945	Victory Star		30.45			
1946	Crissie Tanist	Tanist – Milanies Yank	30.40			
1947	Priceless Border	Clonahard Border – Priceless Sandills	29.54			
1948	Something Short	Uacterlainn Riac – Lloydsboro Lass	29.90			
1949	Esso Major		30.15			
1957	The Grand Fire	The Grand Champion – Quare Fire	29.45	Paddy Dunphy	4/11f	
1958	Summerhill Reject	Baytown Coak – Kilcomney Hostess	30.20			
1959	Toast the Champ	The Grand Champion – Little Toast	29.70			
1960	Springvalley Grand	The Grand Champion – Springvalley Lady	29.95			
1961	Kileden General	The Grand Fire – Kilcomney Mistress	29.55	Dermott Hughes		
1962	Rattle the Key	Man of Pleasure – Red Hot	29.45			
1963	Piper Apache	The Grand Genius – Wee Look	29.85			
1964	Mothel Chief	Knock Hill Chieftain – The Grand Duchess	29.70	Paddy Dunphy		
1965	Kileden Guest	Chieftains Guest – Donore Mistress	29.76	Dermott Hughes	7/1	
1966	Happy Thadie	Pigalle Wonder – Oughter Fire	29.70			
1967	Whiteleas Gift	Hi Con – Hi Abbey	29.90	Tommy Manning		
1968	Sallys Chance	Oregon Prince – Sallys Dreamer	29.85			
1969	Right O'Myross	Myross Again – Right On Time	29.90	Dave Cashman		
1970	Gentle Lady	Buffalo Bill – Cailin Na Coise	29.90	Patrick Carrigan		
1971	Westpark Anti	Comstat – Westpark Grace	30.18			
1972	Rathokelly Gem		30.05			
1973	Big Kuda	Kilbeg Kuda – Far Down	29.98	Ger McKenna		
1974	Quote Me	The Grand Silver – Gruelling Point	29.96	Moira O'Callaghan		
1975	Kaiser Bill	Hack Up Fenian – Bright Chance	29.64			
1976	CillDubh Darkey	Mortor Light – CillDubh Lane	29.64	Ger McKenna		
1977	Greenane Decca	Monalee Champion – Fit Me In	29.68			
1978	Always Kelly	Rail Ship -Advance Miss	30.34	Matt O'Donnell		
1979	Hume Highway	Free Speech – Coaster	30.16			
1980	Flying Marble	Sole Aim – LT's Princess	30.02	Mick Collins		
1981	Calandra Champ	Itsachampion – Calendar Girl	29.66	Francie Murray	1/3f	
1982	Badge of Hickory	Lindas Champion – Badge of May	29.70			
1983	Game Ball	Sand Man – Stay in Business	29.26	Sean Burke		
1984	Spring Play	Knockrour Slave – Highfield Spring	29.28			
1985	Kansas Rebel	Light Mercury – Mary Shane	29.58	Matt O'Donnell		
1986	Dilly Don't Dally	Brilliant Chimes – Milltown Queen	29.52	Noel Scully	4/1	
1987	Droopys Jaguar	Game Ball – Derry Linda	29.44	Fraser Black	2/1	first sand surface
1988	Dangerous Bridge	Easy And Slow – Ladys Role	28.94	Margaret Galvin	7/1	
1989	Arrancourt Duke	The Other Risk – Knocknaboha Snap	28.46	Matt O'Donnell	11/8f	
1990	Adraville Bridge	Im Slippy – Milltown Gem	29.14	Mossie O'Connor	10/1	
1991	Live Contender	Im Slippy – Lanigans Ball	28.90	Ned Lennon	4/5f	
1992	Glenmoira	Im Slippy – Glenivy	29.21	Liam Kirley	10/1	
1993	Rhincrew Sean	Adraville Bridge – Rhincrew Misty	28.64	Irene Barry		
1994	Come on Ranger	Greenpark Fox – Mandies Handbag	28.82	John O'Connor	4/6f	
1995	Airmount Coal	Coalbrook Tiger – Airmount Kelly	29.31	Gerald Kiely		
1996	Shanless Slippy	Murlens Slippy- Lisnakill Flyer	29.24	Dolores Ruth	11/10f	
1997	Clashaphuca	Come On Ranger – Swedish Belle	28.68	Fraser Black	3/1	
1998	Maestro Mike	Cry Dalcash – Queen Prize	28.84	Martin Fortune	10/1	
1999	Borna Survivor	Staplers Jo – Cool Survivor	29.15	Ruairi Dwan	9/2	
2000	Moyne Rebel	Trade Official – Try A Minnie	28.70	Liam McCormack	1/2f	Track record
2001	Droopys Kewell	Larkhill Jo – Perrys Pusher	28.95	Michael Dunphy	5/2	
2002	Give And Go	Top Honcho – Chill Out Olive	29.19	Francie Murray	5/2	
2003	Clashduff Fun	Prince of Tinrah – Clashduff Sara	28.79	Dolores Ruth	2/1	
2004	Geldrops Touch	Droopys Vieri – Sporting Cleo	28.56	Owen McKenna	6/4jf	
2005	Roisins Dessie	Carlton Bale – Lagile Minnie	28.82	Nicky Turner	5/2	
2006	Eskimo Jack	Brett Lee – Kinturk Bluebell	28.54	Fergal Haugh	4/1	
2007	Green Heat	Sonic Light – Ballymac Minnie	28.78	Liam Dowling	4/1	
2008	Knowsley Jake	Jamella Tiger – Wish Upon	28.65	Bernadette Connolly	3/1	
2009	Duke Special	Ballymac Maeve – Owvane Beauty	28.40	Michael Delahunty	2/1f	
2010	Faypoint Dave	Hondo Black – Drive On Fancy	28.64	Owen McKenna	5/2	
2011	Whiteys Hawk	Droopys Vieri – Whiteys Millie	28.38	Declan Bryne	7/1	
2012	Power of God	Head Bound – Moneygall Larky	28.65	Pat Curtin	7/2	
2013	Christys Bolt	Westmead Hawk – Christys Diamond	28.58	Owen McKenna	2/1	
2014	Boylesports Hero	Top Savings – Cabra Midget	28.45	Brendan Matthews	5/4f	
2015	Ballybough Mondo	Scolari Me Daddy – High St Miley	28.55	Martin 'Murt' Leahy	3/1	
2016	Clares Rocket	Confident Rankin – Lemon Madrid	28.00	Graham Holland	1/2f	
2017	Clonbrien Hero	Razldazl Jayfkay – Trout or Salmon	28.22	Graham Holland	5/4jf	
2018	Cash Is King	Tyrur Big Mike – Fire Height Brid	28.43	Brendan Maunsell	6/4f	
2019	Grangeview Ten	Zero Ten – Portumna West	28.62	Patrick Guilfoyle	5/2	
2020	Newinn Taylor	Droopys Buick – Newinn Expert	28.34	Graham Holland	+N/A	+ due to COVID-19 pandemic
2021	Explosive Boy	Good News – Delightful Girl	28.28	Patrick Guilfoyle	+N/A	+ due to COVID-19 pandemic
2022	Gaston Pecas	Droopys Sydney – Bobsleigh Jet	28.36	Pat Buckley	6/1	
2023	Burgess Supreme	Burgess Bucks – Burgess Dancer	28.52	Sheila Spillane	20/1	
2024	Unamimouspanther	Droopys Sydney – Mystical Moll	28.38	Pat Buckley	9/4	
2025	Lemon Joey	Ballymac best – Lemon Ariana	28.60	Murt Leahy	9/4	

== Sponsors ==
- 1980–1980 (Purina)
- 1988–1988 (Victory Dog Foods)
- 1991–1991 (Clonmel Chemicals)
- 1992–1993 (Red Mills)
- 1994–1996 (Country Pork)
- 1998–1998 (Gain)
- 2003–2005 (Irish Stud Dog Owners & Red Mills)
- 2006–2013 (Connolly's Red Mills)
- 2014–2017 (Bank of Ireland Finance)
- 2018–2022 (Larry O'Rourke)
- 2023–2023 (Thatch Bar & Restaurant)
- 2024–2024 (Kasko Peftood)
- 2025–2025 (Carrick Aldo at stud)
