= Limerick Greyhound Stadium =

Greyhound racing venue in Limerick, Ireland

- Location: Greenpark, Dock Road, Limerick, Ireland
- Coordinates: 52°38′57.4″N 8°39′24.4″W
- Operated by: Greyhound Racing Ireland
- Date opened: 2010
- Race type: greyhound racing

Limerick Greyhound Stadium is a greyhound racing track located in the Dock Road (south-west) area of Limerick, Ireland.

The stadium has a grandstand restaurant, hospitality suites, fast food facilities and a number of bars. Racing takes place on a Thursday (6:30pm) and Saturday (7.30pm).

== History ==
In 2009 the old Markets Field Greyhound Stadium just off the Garryowen Road was closed to enable a new greyhound track to replace it. The new site chosen was the former horse racing course at Greenpark and in 2008 the area underwent significant change.

When the stadium was completed to the tune of €18 million at Greenpark, Dock Road it impressed all within the industry. The official opening night was on 22 October 2010 and the stadium has a capacity attendance of 2,900 including a 190-seat grandstand restaurant called the Leger Restaurant after a major event held at the track. Private hospitality suites and gallery bars were also constructed one of which is named after Markets Field Stadium.

The previously mentioned St Leger which was first held at the old Limerick Stadium in 1940 and is an original classic race was duly switched to the new track and continues to be contested. The Kirby Memorial Stakes is also held here and boasted a record €80,000 to the winner in 2014. It was sponsored by J. P. McManus who had close ties with the old Limerick track.

The track is owned and operated by Greyhound Racing Ireland (formerly the Irish Greyhound Board) and they have their headquarters on site.

== Competitions ==
=== Current ===
- St Leger
- Kirby Memorial Stakes

=== Former ===
- Oaks (1942)

== Track records ==
Current

Yards	Greyhound	Time (sec)	Date	Notes/ref
350	Ballinakill Alf	18.22	22 June 2024	
525	Ballymac Danica	27.83	23 March 2024	
550	Jaytee Taylor	29.21	2 November 2019	
575	Thats It Jack	30.80	7 September 2024	
600	Ower Cracker	32.04	17 August 2024	
750	Tuono Charlie	40.73	31 August 2024	
800	Lodge Lady	44.54	22 November 2014	

Former

Yards	Greyhound	Time (sec)	Date	Notes
350	Pesoto	18.72	22 October 2010	
350	Broadacres Bolt	18.63	9 July 2011	
350	Swabys Tony	18.60	30 July 2011	
350	Ballymac Best	18.53	16 March 2013	
350	Holborn Junior	18.43	12 April 2014	
350	Quietly	18.38	26 March 2016	
350	Cree Jo Jo	18.36	1 July 2023	
525	Joey Jojo Junior	28.35	8 October 2010	
525	Tyrur Tinkerbell	28.28	19 March 2011	
525	Ogie Tom	28.25	4 February 2012	
525	Lass Cause	28.21	5 March 2012	
525	College Maybe	27.95	2 February 2013	
525	Clona Duke	=27.95	1 April 2023	
550	Makeshift	29.76	22 October 2010	
550	Farley Turbo	29.57	18 December 2010	St Leger Final
550	Paradise Casino	29.51	18 June 2011	St Leger third round
550	Ocean Crash	29.43	22 July 2011	
550	Varra Rumble	29.41	21 September 2012	
550	Skywalker Puma	29.35	29 June 2013	
550	Jaytee Hellcat	29.31	9 November 2013	St Leger third round
550	Priceless Brandy	29.26	22 October 2016	
575	Money Go Easy	31.32	16 October 2010	
575	Yeah Me	31.31	18 June 2011	
575	Future Gem	31.19	15 December 2011	
575	Riverside Mary	30.96	17 March 2012	
600	Greenane Bingo	32.40	2 July 2011	
600	Lemon Belle	32.21	19 August 2011	
600	Chestnut King	32.14	26 August 2023	
600	Blackstone Lacey	32.05	25 November 2023	
750	Ferdia Bound	41.80	22 October 2010	
750	Gortown Rosie	41.73	9 July 2011	
750	Future Boy	41.61	10 November 2012	
750	Tradition	41.46	27 August 2016	Cambridgeshire Open semi
750	Skywalker Logan	41.41	12 September 2020	Cambridgeshire Open Final
750	Roaming Mystery	41.40	28 August 2021	
750	Threesixfive	41.08	9 September 2023	
