= Graham Holland =

British and Irish professional greyhound trainer

- Holland with Slippy Cian

Personal information
- Born: 1961 (age 63–64) Wiltshire, England
- Occupation: Greyhound trainer

Sport
- Sport: Greyhound racing

Achievements and titles
- National finals: Derby wins: English Derby (2022, 2023); Irish Derby (2016, 2019, 2020, 2024, 2025); Classic and Feature wins: Laurels (2009, 2012, 2016, 2017, 2023); Easter Cup (2015, 2019, 2020, 2023, 2024); Oaks (2015); St Leger (2017, 2023, 2024); Champion Stakes (2015, 2016); National Produce (2016, 2017, 2020); Select Stakes (2009, 2016, 2017, 2019, 2023); Cox Cup (2008); Tipperary Cup (2005, 2008, 2010, 2020); Arc (2017); Race of Champions (2018, 2019); Shelbourne 600 (2019); Kirby Memorial Stakes (2022, 2023, 2025); Irish Puppy Derby (2022); Juvenile (2024)

Graham D. Holland (born 1961) is an English and Irish greyhound trainer. He is a record five times Irish Greyhound Derby and twice English Greyhound Derby winning trainer.

== Profile ==
Holland left school aged 16, to work at the Hook Estate and Kennels for Greyhound Racing Association trainer Randy Singleton, who was based at White City. He then moved to work for Jill and Gordon Holt. After a break he returned to greyhound racing on the independent circuit. In September 1992, based at the Avon Park Kennels on Ringwood Road, in St Ives, Dorset he applied for and was granted a National Greyhound Racing Club licence and gained an attachment at Portsmouth Stadium where he met his wife Nicky.

His first major training feat was steering One For Tarbert through to the Wendy Fair St Leger at Wembley on 15 November 1996. He reached the 1997 Scurry Gold Cup final with Official Figure before Holland moved to Poole Stadium and became the track's champion trainer but he soon required a track that could provide regular races for his higher class of greyhound. He subsequently joined Oxford Stadium in 2000 and continued to build a strong reputation. In 2001 he then became attached to Brighton & Hove Greyhound Stadium and reached the final of the RD Racing Cesarewitch.

In 2002 Graham and Nicky made the decision to move to Golden, County Tipperary in Ireland, they set up the Riverside Kennel on a seven-acre plot. The move inevitably resulted in a period of transition for the kennel and it was not until 2005 that they tasted success winning the 2005 Tipperary Cup with Broadacres Tommy. The competition wins began to regularly arrive from 2008 including the Cox Cup and Tipperary Cup (2008) and the Laurels and Select Stakes (2009).

The following decade would see the kennel become the most significant in Ireland and arguably the United Kingdom, in 2012 Knockglass Billy won the Laurels and the following year Cabra Buck reached the 2013 Irish Greyhound Derby final It was during 2015 that Holland was propelled into the leading trainer in Ireland, he won the Easter Cup with Sidarian Blaze, the Oaks with Ballydoyle Honey and the Champion Stakes with Sidarian Vega.

In 2016 he won Ireland's leading prize, the Boylesports Irish Greyhound Derby with Rural Hawaii. In addition Clares Rocket won the National Produce and Champion Stakes and Skywalker Manner won the Laurels. The following year (2017) resulted in a Clonbrien Hero winning three competitions; the St Leger, Produce and Laurels. Following a quiet 2018 he bounced back with a second Derby triumph when Lenson Bocko won the 2019 Irish Greyhound Derby. The year also contained major wins in the Easter Cup, Shelbourne 600, Select Stakes and the Race of Champions.

Holland began 2020 with a third Easter Cup title, this time with Wolfe and after the COVID-19 pandemic lockdown he won a third National Produce in five years, with Newinn Taylor who won his 12th successive race. The success continued when Newinn Taylor then won the 2020 Irish Greyhound Derby winning his 16th race from 18 starts, propelling Holland on to a short list of three time Irish Derby winners behind four-time winners Tom Lynch and Gay McKenna. Newinn Taylor was later voted Irish Greyhound of the Year.

In 2022, he won the Kirby Memorial Stakes with Swords Rex and again in 2023 with Clonbrien Treaty before Romeo Magico, a black and white dog won the 2022 English Greyhound Derby and the first prize of £175,000. The greyhound owned and bred by David Firmager provided Holland with the completion of his ambition of winning the English Derby. He duly won a second English Derby the following year in 2023 with Gaytime Nemo.

A record equalling fourth Irish Derby came his way during the 2024 edition, when a black dog called Bockos Diamond lit up the competition breaking and equalling the track record in two rounds of the competition on his way to an unbeaten success. Six flawless runs saw him become the shortest winner of a final in the event's history and brought Holland equal with McKenna and Lynch on four Irish Derby titles.

In 2025, Holland claimed a record fifth Irish Derby after Cheap Sandwiches won the 2025 Derby.
