= Kent St Leger =

Former greyhound racing competition

- Class: Category 1
- Location: Ramsgate (1989–1995); Crayford (1996–2024)
- Inaugurated: 1989
- Final run: 2024

Race information
- Surface: Sand

The Kent St Leger was a greyhound racing competition held annually.

It was held at Ramsgate Stadium until the track closed, then it switched to Crayford Stadium in 1996. The competition ended with the closure of Crayford Stadium in 2024.

== Venues & distances ==
- 1989–1995 (Ramsgate 640m)
- 1996–2024 (Crayford 714m)

== Sponsors ==
- 1989–1992, 1994–1995 (Max Thomas Bookmakers)
- 1993–1993 (Tiberius)
- 1998–1998 (John Humphreys & Tony Morris Bookmakers)
- 2001–2002 (Courage Brewery)
- 2003–2003 (Consumer Advisory)
- 2004–2004 (Courage Brewery)
- 2005–2013 (John Smith's Brewery)
- 2014–2016 (Carlsberg)
- 2017–2020 (Jay & Kay Coach Tours)
- 2021–2021, 2024 (Ladbrokes)
- 2022–2023 (Jay & Kay Coach Tours)

== Winners ==
Year	Winner	Breeding	Trainer	Time (sec)	SP	Notes/ref
1989	Easy Mark	Easy and Slow – Vara Black Nose	John Rouse (Hove)		14/1	
1990	Carlsberg Champ	Ballyregan Bob – Chocolate Satin	Barry Silkman (Private)	40.46	7/2	
1991	Bobs Regan	Ballyregan Bob – Sandy Gem	Brian Timcke (Private)	39.97	7/4f	
1992	Trans Domino	Dukes Lodge – Trans Linda	Maldwyn Thomas (Ramsgate)	40.40	5/2	
1993	Heavenly Lady	Manorville Sand – Black Sancisco	Linda Mullins (Walthamstow)		9/4	
1994						
1995	Decoy Cheetah	Slaneyside Hare – Easy Bimbo	Pam Cobbold (Private)	39.92	4/1	
1996	Musical Treat	Farloe Melody – Jenny Be Good	Brian Clemenson (Hove)	46.06	9/4f	
1997	Bubbly Boy	Adraville Bridge – Poor Sue	Linda Jones (Walthamstow)	46.56	6/4jf	
1998	Droopys Paul	Leaders Best – Droopys Fiona	Linda Jones (Walthamstow)	46.37	4/5f	
1999	Phils Ann Marie	Boyne Walk – Druids Le Mis	Paul Young (Romford)	46.28	8/1	
2000	Pearl Barley	Frightful Flash – Fearsome Misty	Richard Joyce (Henlow)	47.12	3/1	
2001	Moreton Jazz	Smooth Rumble – Cheeky Gypsy	John Spracklen (Private)	46.07	16/1	
2002	Countrywide Karen	Split the Bill – Joes Speaking	Paul Young (Romford)	45.56	1/1f	
2003	Latin Beauty	Rio Riccardo – Tinas Beauty	Cheryl Miller (Sittingbourne)	45.21	5/4f	
2004	Droopys Savanna	Jamaican Hero – Droopys Spice	Brian Clemenson (Hove)	45.84	7/4	
2005	Return to Suir	Lavally Pete – Brazilian Gem	Jean Carter (Crayford)	46.02	12/1	
2006	Dods Delight	Larkhill Jo – Rockmount Hazel	Sean Walsh (Harlow)	46.12	9/4	
2007	Princessmonalulu	Droopys Rhys – Droopys Princess	Brian Clemenson (Hove)	46.70	6/4f	
2008	Midway Skipper	Top Honcho – Midway Tomsscout	Henry Chalkley (Henlow)	46.49	4/6f	
2009	Midway Skipper	Top Honcho – Midway Tomsscout	Henry Chalkley (Henlow)	45.71	2/7f	
2010	Lottes Girl	Westmead Hawk – Lively Jubbley	Heather Dimmock (Peterborough)	45.85	6/4	
2011	Wise Signal	Go Wild Teddy – Wise Actress	Frank Gray (Private)	45.86	1/2f	
2012	Crinkill Jewel	Crash – Dixies Model	Kevin Hutton (Swindon)	45.80	7/2	
2013	Aayamzalad	Ace Hi Rumble – Pretty Nicola	David Mullins (Romford)	45.62	7/1	
2014	Borna Champ	Head Bound – Borna Talent	John Mullins (Yarmouth)	45.37	7/2	
2015	Droopys Tamera	Westmead Hawk – Droopys Solange	Dean Childs (Crayford)	45.02	4/9f	
2016	Jimbobjoe	Droopys Cain – Yahoo Lilly	Ricky Holloway (Central Park)	45.60	9/4	
2017	Maireads Ivy	Hondo Black – Winning Impact	Derek Knight (Hove)	45.28	2/1f	
2018	Slippy Maggie	Godsend – Mays Bodyguard	Hazel Kemp (Peterborough)	45.72	9/4	
2019	Antigua Fire	Vulturi – Precious Story	Mark Wallis (Henlow)	23.11	5/2	
2020	Droopys Bird	Droopys Roddick – Droopys Force	Simon Harms (Private)	45.51	10/1	
2021	Bo Shine Bullet	Kinloch Brae – Fear Emoski	Mark Wallis (Henlow)	45.55	1/1f	
2022	Rising Coco	Kinloch Brae – Old Fort Dakota	Jim Reynolds (Crayford)	45.44	10/1	
2023	Low Pressure	Pat C Sabbath – Highview Lauren	Belinda Green (Hove)	45.38	4/1	
2024	Coonough Crow	Eden the Kid – Coonough Dolly	Mark Wallis (Suffolk Downs)	45.21	2/1jf	
