= WJ & JE Cearns Invitation =

- Class: Category 2
- Location: Central Park Stadium
- Inaugurated: 1951
- Final run: 2017

Race information
- Distance: 500 metres
- Surface: Sand

The WJ & JE Cearns Invitation is a greyhound racing competition held annually at Central Park Stadium. It was inaugurated at Wimbledon Stadium in 1951 as the W. J. Cearns Memorial Trophy following the death of W. J. Cearns in 1950.

W. J. Cearns was the founder of Wimbledon Stadium and chairman of West Ham United F.C. The event was held in his honour until 2006 when his grandson Roger Cearns (owner of Central Park) brought the competition to Sittingbourne. It was renamed the WJ & JE Cairns Invitation, with the JE part being named after his father John who was also instrumental in the history of Wimbledon.

== Past winners ==
Year	Winner	Breeding	Trainer	Time (sec)	SP	Notes/ref
1951	Fancy Hero	Trabolgan Prince – Carriganea Lass	Jack Harvey (Wembley)	30.23	4–5f	
1952	Ryton Basher	Model Dasher – Ryton Blunder	Stan Martin (Wimbledon)	28.34	4–1	
1953	Judy Luck	Trevs Cutter – Queens Wood	Stan Martin (Wimbledon)	28.48	10–1	
1954	Forever Cloone	Bellas Prince – Rare Rarity	Dennis Hannafin (Wimbledon)	28.83	13–2	
1955	Fitzs Marquis		Tom Paddy Reilly (Walthamstow)	28.65	7–1	
1956	Spark Prince	Fire Prince - Ell For Leather	Paddy Fortune (Wimbledon)	28.41	8–1	
1957	Ford Spectre	Polonius – Harrow Glamour	Dennis Hannafin (Wimbledon)	28.13	33–1	
1958	Gentle Touch	Magourna Reject – Abbey Jane	Dennis Hannafin (Wimbledon)	28.44	8–1	
1959	Greenane Valley	Champion Prince – Prairie Vixen	George Waterman (Wimbledon)	28.43	40–1	
1960	Dunstown Champion	Demon King – Geffs Linnett	Paddy McEllistrim (Wimbledon)	28.02	11–2	
1961	Oregon Prince	Knock Hill Chieftain – Burleighs Fancy	Phil Rees Sr. (Private)	28.17		
1962	Little Archie	Flash Jack – Little Jingler	Henry Parsons (Crayford)	28.31		
1963	Coup Leader	Disabled Leader – Nancys Honeymoon	Clare Orton (Wimbledon)	28.50		
1964	Cranog Bet	Knock Hill Chieftain – Dont Bet	Phil Rees Sr. (Private)	28.28	4–5f	
1965	Cranog Bet	Knock Hill Chieftain –Dont Bet	Phil Rees Sr. (Private)	28.14		
1966	Clopooks Collar		Clare Orton (Wimbledon)	28.06		
1967	Warfield Flash	Alpine Miller – Anything Goes	Len Drewery (Private)	27.87		
1968	No Credit	The Grand Prince – Ladys Plume	Nora Gleeson (Wimbledon)	28.21	8–1	
1969	Always Present	Printers Prince – Berrings Five	Phil Rees Sr. (Wimbledon)	28.75	5–1	
1970	Bell Solo	Sunbow – Clopook Lassie	Paddy McEllistrim (Wimbledon)	28.10	2–1	
1971	Sole Aim	Monalee Champion - Yurituni	David Geggus (Walthamstow)	27.96	2–1	
1972	Mullas Shore	O'Leary – Cremona Maid	Clare Orton (Wimbledon)	28.54	10–1	
1973	Mels Pupil	Monalee King – Ellas Rocket	Frank Baldwin (Perry Barr)	27.74	3–1	
1974	Carry on Bimbo	Monalee Champion – Silver Oregon	Paddy Coughlan (Crayford)	28.45	4–1	
1975	Sandispec	Spectre II – Cydnys Hope	Clare Orton (Wimbledon)	40.66	1–2f	
1976	Monalee Customer	Ritas Choice – Monalee Dream	George Curtis (Brighton)	40.99	5–4f	
1977	Miss Kilkenny	Monalee Champion – Spring Breeze	Bill Bookle (Private)	40.89	6–1	
1978	Muskerry Air	Knockhill Champion – MuskerryTreveno	Phil Rees Sr. (Wimbledon)	40.82	1–1f	
1979	Clountie Comment	Toms Pal – Candid Comment	George Curtis (Brighton)	41.03	16–1	
1980	Murrays Champion	Itsachampion – Fur Collar	Paddy McEvoy (Wimbledon)	41.36	5–2	
1981	Flower Noel	Yellow Band – High Drama	Linda Mullins (Cambridge)	40.92	10–3	
1982	KasamaTrac	Butchers Trac- Lady Kasama	George Curtis (Brighton)	40.83	1–2f	
1983	Decoy Lassie	Westown Adam – Tibbys Girl	Joe Cobbold (Ipswich)	40.84	4–6f	
1984	Pagan Sand	Sand Man – The Grand Inn	Ted Dickson (Slough)	40.92	7–2	
1985	Crown Mars	Inny Mist – I'm Trendy	Philip Rees Jr. (Wimbledon)	41.22	20–1	
1986	Shining Bright	Lax Law – Bright Fur	Gary Baggs (Ramsgate)	41.46	4–1	
1987	Ohteevee	For Real – Patricia May	Ted Dickson (Wembley)	40.51	5–1	
1988	Bankers Benefit	Easy And Slow – Society Girl	Adam Jackson (Wembley)	40.65	2–1	
1989	Millgrove Girl	Lodge Prince – Under The Stone	Albert Hill (Private)	40.74	1–5f	
1990	Trans Mercedes	Oran Jack - Shelley	Maldwyn Thomas (Reading)	40.46	10–11f	
1991	Sail Over	Ballygarvan What – Touch The Sail	Sam Sykes (Wimbledon)	40.97	4–5f	
1992	Lets All Boogie	Carters Lad – Princess Alucard	John Coleman (Walthamstow)	40.57	1–3f	
1993	Heavenly Lady	Manorville Sand – Black Sancisco	Linda Mullins (Walthamstow)	40.68	4–5f	
1994	Heavenly Lady	Manorville Sand – Black Sancisco	Linda Mullins (Walthamstow)	40.46	11–8jf	
1997	Wandering One	Leaders Best – Passing Whim	Derek Knight (Hove)	40.97	7–4cf	
1998	Awbeg Sally	Low Sail – Ardbeg Ruby	Bill Masters (Hove)	40.55	1–1f	
1999	Palace Issue	Deerpark Jim – Clear Issue	Linda Mullins (Walthamstow)	40.87	1–4f	
2000	Palace Issue	Deerpark Jim – Clear Issue	Linda Mullins (Walthamstow)	40.89	4–5f	
2001	Palace Issue	Deerpark Jim – Clear Issue	John Mullins (Walthamstow)	41.36	8–11f	
2002	Form of Magic	Iceni Regent – Clodeen Magic	Brian Clemenson (Hove)	40.97	1–10f	
2003	Dunbarton Cross	Toms The Best – Dunbarton Legend	Wayne Wrighting (Hove)	40.87	6–4f	
2004	Special Trick	Spiral Nikita – Castlerea Delia	Linda Jones (Walthamstow)	40.82	5–4	Track record
2005	Dods Delight	Larkhill Jo – Rockmount Hazel	John Walsh (Wimbledon)	41.96	16–1	
2006	Battle Ground	Top Honcho – Lovely Sharon	Alan Stevens (Oxford)	30.73	3–1	
2007	Lenson Express	Top Honcho – Gold Seacrest	Tony Collett (Sittingbourne)	30.31	7–4f	Track record
2008	Rocky Rocket	Droopys Scholes – Kincraig Lauren	George Andreas (Sittingbourne)	30.59	6–1	
2009	Corrig Vieri	Droopys Vieri – Corrig Rebel	Mark Wallis (Harlow)	30.29	4–6f	
2010	Dilemmas Tom	Toms The Best – Westmead Oak	Spencer Mavrias (Sittingbourne)	30.38	7–2	
2011	Salacres Polizzi	Collision – Fabulous Airport	Peter Harnden (Nottingham)	30.36	11–2	
2012	Westmead Maldini	Droopys Maldini – Mega Delight	Nick Savva (Private)	30.27	11–10f	
2013	Ballymac Luke	Royal Impact – Coolavanny Key	Richard Clarke (Henlow)	30.47	7–4f	
2014	Droopys Norris	Droopys Scolari – Droopys Lotto	Dean Childs (Hove)	29.76	2–1jf	
2017	Brinkleys King	Blonde Snapper - Grayslands Swan	Seamus Cahill (Hove)	31.01	9–4	

== Venues and distances ==
- 1951–1974: Wimbledon, 500 yards
- 1975–2005: Wimbledon, 660 metres
- 2015–2016: not held
- Since 2006: Sittingbourne/Central Park, 500 metres
