= Kent Derby =

British greyhound racing competition

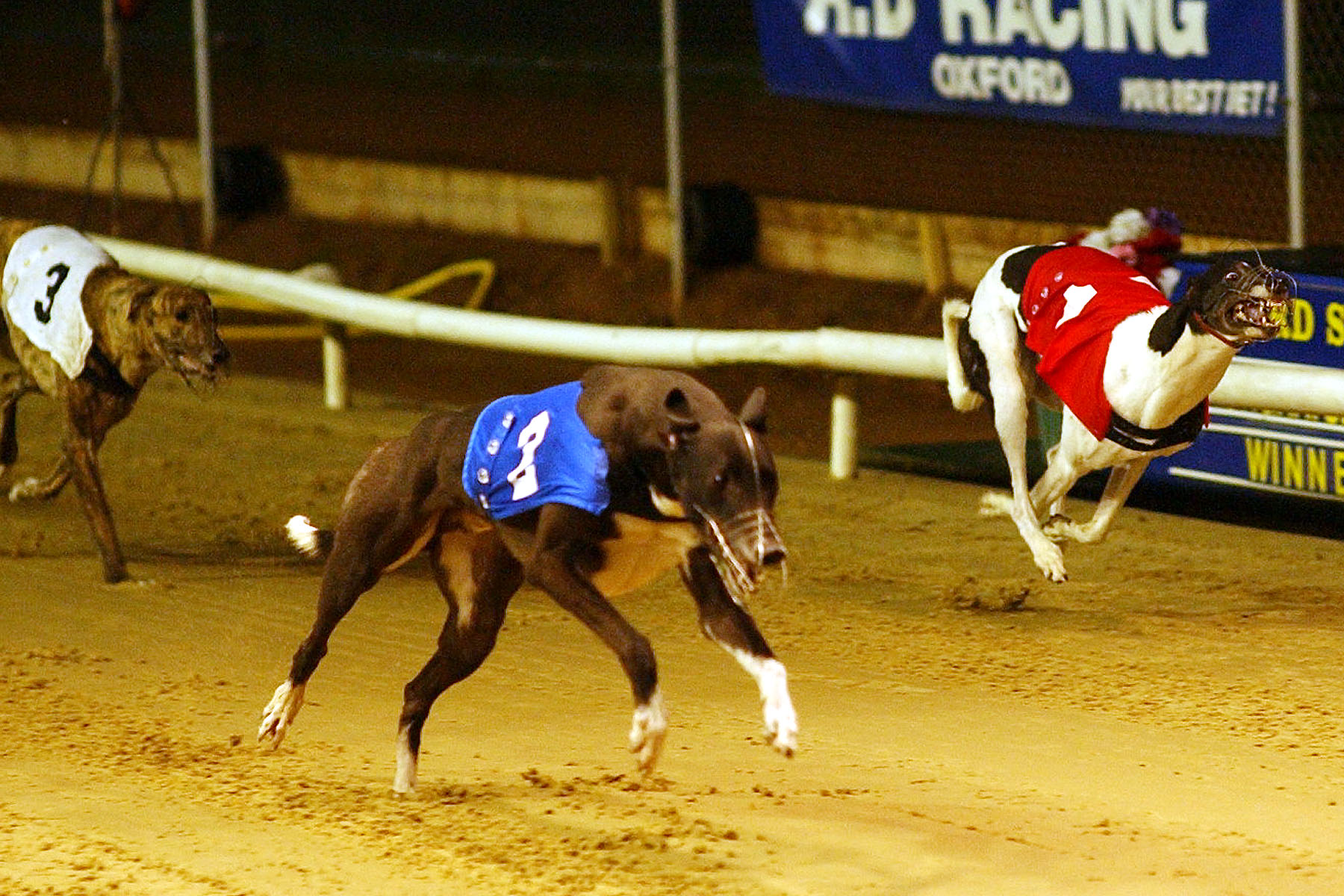
- Willie Go Fa, 2002 champion
- Class: Category 1
- Location: Central Park Stadium
- Inaugurated: 2000
- Sponsor: Premier Greyhound Racing

Race information
- Distance: 491 metres
- Surface: Sand
- Purse: £20,000 (winner)

The Kent Derby is a greyhound racing competition held annually at Central Park Stadium. It was inaugurated in 2000. The event is currently a category one race.

In 2022, the first prize was increased to £20,000 following sponsorship from Premier Greyhound Racing.

== Venues and distances ==
- 2000–2022 (Sittingbourne/Central Park, 480m)
- 2023–present (Central Park, 491m)

== Sponsors ==
- 2015–2016 (John Smith's)
- 2017–2017 (Cearnsport)
- 2018–2020 (Ladbrokes)
- 2021–2021 (Arena Racing Company)
- 2022–2025 (Premier Greyhound Racing)

== Past winners ==
Year	Winner	Breeding	Trainer	Time (sec)	SP	Notes/ref
2000	Smoking Bullet	Joyful Tidings – Aggies Vixen	Derek Knight (Hove)	28.55	1/1f	
2001	Pinewood Blue	Top Honcho – Battstreet Linda	Linda Jones (Walthamstow)	28.69	10/11f	
2002	Willie Go Fa	Plasterscene Gem – Alisons Beauty	Brian Clemenson (Hove)	28.87	7/2	
2003	Haughty Ted	Doyou Getit – Haughty Lady	Dinky Luckhurst (Crayford)	28.80	8/11f	
2004	Manera Spark	Mancunian Star – Minnies Sparkler	John Mullins (Walthamstow)	28.57	4/1	
2005	Manera Spark	Mancunian Star – Minnies Sparkler	John Mullins (Walthamstow)	29.34	10/11f	
2006	Carlin Honcho	Top Honcho – Aries Rose	Tony Collett (Sittingbourne)	29.38	8/1	
2007	Moaning Zizou	Brett Lee – Do Right Woman	Darren Whitton (Henlow)	29.62	20/1	
2008	Vipar Totti	Daves Mentor – Spooky Blondie	Alison Ingram (Romford)	29.24	9/4jf	
2009	Lenson Bolt	Royal Impact – Catunda Paris	Tony Collett (Sittingbourne)	29.27	6/4	
2010	Sparklee Bernie	Brett Lee – Droopys Sparkler	Seamus Cahill (Hove)	29.58	6/1	
2011	Jazz Apollo	Westmead Hawk – Jazz Hurricane	Mark Wallis (Yarmouth)	29.24	3/1	
2012	Ballycowen Dave	Royal Impact – Madam Hero	Chris Allsopp (Monmore)	29.01	4/1	
2013	Exocet	Head Bound – Slip Road	Chris Allsopp (Monmore)	28.52	1/1f	
2014	Underground Paul	Ace Hi Rumble – Kerryroad Lucy	Paul Young (Romford)	28.87	11/4	
2015	Do It For Twiggy	Droopys Scolari – Rackethall Holly	Erica Samuels (Yarmouth)	28.84	100/30	
2016	Bubbly Bluebird	Droopys Sidney – Broadstrand Xola	Paul Young (Romford)	28.87	5/4f	
2017	Bockos Alfie	Droopys Scolari - Ballymac Scarlet	Patrick Janssens (Towcester)	28.84	12/1	
2018	King Turbo	Leamaneigh Turbo - Wee Tiger Tots	Liz McNair (Private)	28.96	4/6f	
2019	Forest Alan	Ballymac Vic – Forest Mollie	Seamus Cahill (Hove)	29.00	4/1	
2020	Kilara Lion	Droopys Jet – Kilara Lizzie	Patrick Janssens (Towcester)	28.90	7/1	
2021	Galaxy Freedom	Over Limit – Kilcooney Maid	Stuart Maplesden (Hove)	29.26	28/1	
2022	Arkady	Droopys Jet – Good Legacy	David Mullins (Romford)	28.82	15/8f	
2023	Churchfield Syd	Droopys Sydney – Millbank Jade	Richard Rees (Brighton)	29.15	13/8f	
2024	Droopys Display	Dromana Bucko – Droopys Zero	Maxine Locke (Romford)	28.45	18/1	Track record
2025	Romeo Tomcat	Dorotas Wildcat – Fabulous Spirit	Patrick Janssens (Towcester)	28.75	7/2	
