= Classic (greyhounds) =

British greyhound racing competition

The Classic
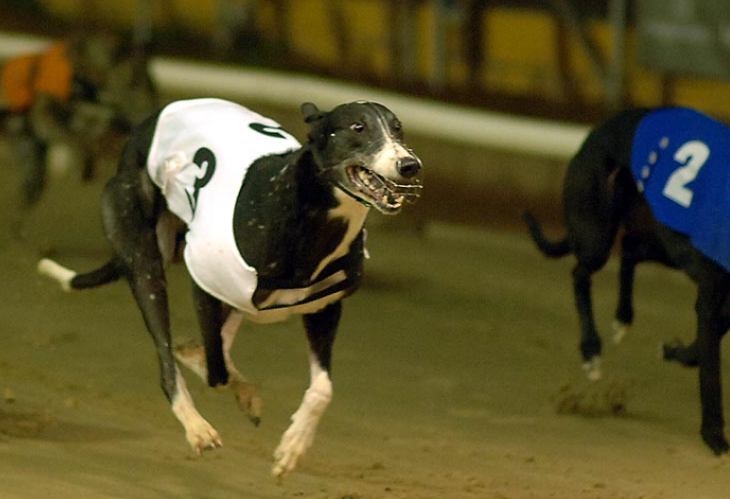
- Mahers Boy, inaugural winner in 2007
- Class: Category 1
- Location: Sunderland
- Inaugurated: 2007
- Sponsor: Premier Greyhound Racing

Race information
- Distance: 450 metres
- Surface: Sand
- Purse: £20,000 (winner)

The Classic is a greyhound racing competition held at Sunderland Greyhound Stadium. It was inaugurated in 2007 and initially formed part of a festival of racing which also included the William Hill Grand Prix. In 2019 the Classic was renamed, dropping the sponsor's name William Hill. The event was not run in 2020 but returned during 2021.

The prize money offered was a substantial first prize of £40,000, which meant that it was considered a major competition in United Kingdom greyhound racing at the time. However, it dropped to just £6,500 before increasing to £10,000 in 2022 and then £20,000 in 2024 under the sponsorship of Premier Greyhound Racing.

== Venue and distances ==
- 2007–2025 (Sunderland 450 metres)

== Sponsors ==
- 2007–2018 (William Hill)
- 2019–2019 (NSL)
- 2021–2023 (ARC)
- 2024–2025 (Premier Greyhound Racing)

== Past winners ==
Year	Winner	Breeding	Trainer	Time (Sec)	SP	Notes/ref
2007	Mahers Boy	Tucks Mein – Rons Luck	Elaine Parker (Sheffield)	26.77	9/4jf	
2008	Lenson Express	Top Honcho – Gold Seacrest	Tony Collett (Sittingbourne)	27.14	3/1	
2009	Jogadusc Ace	Brett Lee – Star of Dromin	Mark Wallis (Harlow)	27.83	5/1	
2010	Target Classic	Big Daddy Cool – Drumna Charm	Craig Dawson (Newcastle)	26.94	7/2	
2011	Blonde Snapper	Droopys Kewell – Rough Charley	Mark Wallis (Yarmouth)	26.59	5/2	Track record
2012	Loughteen Blanco	Droopys Scolari – Loughteen Lassie	Seamus Cahill (Hove)	26.95	5/1	
2013	Pinpoint Maxi	Premier Fantasy – Kingsmill Abu	Kelly Macari (Sunderland)	27.02	4/5f	
2014	Mileheight Alba	Ballymac Maeve – Giddyup Girl	Pat Rosney (Perry Barr)	26.79	7/2	
2015	No But	Ace Hi Rumble – Westmead Cindyuk	Julie Calvert (Sunderland)	27.00	5/2	
2016	Roxholme Scolari	Droopys Scolari – Bellmore Ruby	Hayley Keightley (Private)	26.75	8/1	
2017	Droopys Country	Aero Majestic – Droopys Coast	Angela Harrison (Newcastle)	26.91	3/1	
2018	Allowdale Bruno	Scolari Me Daddy – Noelles Primco	Harry Williams (Pelaw Grange)	26.75	10/1	
2019	Velvet Juliet	Head Bound – Velvet All Jam	Angela Harrison (Newcastle)	26.70	7/4jf	
2020	Not held due to the COVID-19 pandemic					
2021	Narcos The Great	Droopys Jet – College Jade	George Cunningham (Private)	26.84	13/2	
2022	Move Over Cha	Gaytime Hawk – Move Over Eliza	Angela Harrison (Newcastle)	26.76	2/1	
2023	Jonny Whiskers	Skywalker Logan – Cudkevinbewrong	Harry Burton (Newcastle)	26.82	13/8	
2024	Bramble Linton	Ballymac Vic – Jaytee Pearl	Steven Anderson (Newcastle)	26.89	5/2	
2025	Santas Amigo	Ballymac Best Santas Jet	David Mullins (Romford)	26.92	15/8	
