= 2010 Irish Greyhound Derby =

Annual sporting event in Ireland

2010 Ladbrokes Irish Greyhound Derby
- Venue: Shelbourne Park
- Location: Dublin
- Start date: 6 August
- End date: 11 September
- Total prize money: €120,000 (winner)

The 2010 Irish Greyhound Derby took place during August and September with the final being held at Shelbourne Park in Dublin on 11 September 2010.

The winner Tyrur McGuigan won €120,000 and was trained by Conor Fahy, owned and bred by P.J. Fahy. The race was sponsored by the Ladbrokes for the first time.

== Final result ==
At Shelbourne, 11 September (over 550 yards):

| Position | Winner | Breeding | Trap | Sectional | SP | Time | Trainer |
|---|---|---|---|---|---|---|---|
| 1st | Tyrur McGuigan | Brett Lee - Tyrur Temptress | 3 | 3.38 | 8-1 | 29.41 | Conor Fahy |
| 2nd | Tyrur Big Mike | Brett Lee - Tyrur Temptress | 4 | 3.45 | 1-1f | 29.62 | Conor Fahy |
| 3rd | Krug Ninety Five | Droopys Maldini - Frontier Music | 2 | 3.49 | 12-1 | 29.67 | Fraser Black |
| 4th | Thurlesbeg Joker | Head Bound - Free To Air | 5 | 3.63 | 6-1 | 29.88 | Owen McKenna |
| 5th | Barefoot Bullet | Honcho Classic - Ard Flash | 6 | 3.44 | 8-1 | 29.89 | Paul Hennessy |
| 6th | Tullymurry Act | Top Honcho - Europa Spitfire | 1 | 3.48 | 4-1 | 30.73 | Pat Buckley |

=== Distances ===
2½, ½, 2½, short-head, 10½ (lengths)

== Competition Report ==
The 2009 Irish Greyhound Derby champion College Causeway missed the competition after his owner decided to keep him at stud. The 2010 Derby started with four leading contenders being eliminated in the first round. They included three 2009 finalists Faypoint Man, Shaneboy Lee and Belvedere Champ in addition to plus English Oaks winner Shaws Dilemma.

Kinda Ready (the 2009 English Greyhound Derby champion) won for the second time in the competition during round three but the star of the round was Tyrur Big Mike setting a time of 29.42. Barefoot Bullet was successful in 29.68 but there was a shock as Champion Stakes winner Makeshift failed to make the quarter-finals.

Tyrur Big Mike won again in the quarter-finals, recording 29.54, and litter brother Tyrur McGuigan continued to improve when winning again. The other heat winners were Ballymac Under and Tullymurry Act, but Kinda Ready was knocked out.

The PJ Fahy-owned pair starred in the semifinals, with Tyrur Big Mike winning in a very fast 29.28 victory from Tullymurry Act and Easter Cup champion Thurlesbeg Joker, Mesedo Blue went out. The remaining semi went to Tyrur McGuigan in 29.63 from Barefoot Bullet and Krug Ninety Five with former Juvenile winner Ballymac Under failing to make the final.

Tyrur Big Mike was a very short even-money favourite for the final and had only suffered one defeat so far, likewise his brother Tyrur McGuigan had only one loss. Tyrur McGuigan broke well out of the traps followed by his brother. Tyrur McGuigan continued to hold off Tyrur Big Mike and lost a couple of lengths attempting to pass. Tyrur McGuigan went on to win the race that the pair had dominated from start to finish although Krug Ninety Five ran on well. Tullymurry Act, who finished last, returned a positive drugs sample and forfeited any prize money.

== Quarter-finals ==
Heat 1 (Aug 28)
| Pos | Name | SP | Time |
|---|---|---|---|
| 1st | Ballymac Under | 25-1 | 29.96 |
| 2nd | Colorful Champ | 11-4 | 30.01 |
| 3rd | Barefoot Bullet | 3-1 | 30.02 |
| 4th | Monlesa Alsation | 7-2 | 30.07 |
| 5th | Tyrur Enda | 7-4f | 30.25 |
| 6th | Whatsupjack | 25-1 | 30.26 |

Heat 2 (Aug 28)
| Pos | Name | SP | Time |
|---|---|---|---|
| 1st | Tyrur McGuigan | 7-2 | 29.78 |
| 2nd | Krug Ninety Five | 7-2 | 29.85 |
| 3rd | Foyle Storm | 6-1 | 29.90 |
| 4th | Bubbly Olly | 3-1f | 29.94 |
| 5th | Blazers Black | 4-1 | 30.04 |
| 6th | Freedom Seacrest | 7-1 | 30.05 |

Heat 3 (Aug 28)
| Pos | Name | SP | Time |
|---|---|---|---|
| 1st | Tyrur Big Mike | 5-4f | 29.54 |
| 2nd | Thurlesbeg Joker | 4-1 | 29.61 |
| 3rd | Mesedo Blue | 4-1 | 29.68 |
| 4th | Killacolla Glory | 25-1 | 29.82 |
| 5th | Kinda Ready | 7-2 | 29.89 |
| 6th | Westmead Grant | 7-1 | 29.99 |

Heat 4 (Aug 28)
| Pos | Name | SP | Time |
|---|---|---|---|
| 1st | Tullymurry Act | 2-1 | 29.67 |
| 2nd | Hats My Boy | 5-1 | 29.77 |
| 3rd | Dromore Hero | 10-1 | 29.95 |
| 4th | Definate Opinion | 9-10f | 30.00 |
| 5th | Oran Jaguar | 14-1 | 30.11 |
| 6th | Tyrur Richie | 12-1 | 30.18 |

== Semifinals ==
First Semifinal (Sep 4)
| Pos | Name of Greyhound | SP | Time |
|---|---|---|---|
| 1st | Tyrur Big Mike | 5-4f | 29.28 |
| 2nd | Tullymurry Act | 4-1 | 29.66 |
| 3rd | Thurlesbeg Joker | 4-1 | 29.70 |
| 4th | Mesedo Blue | 6-1 | 29.75 |
| 5th | Colorful Champ | 7-1 | 29.76 |
| 6th | Dromore Hero | 33-1 | 29.94 |

Second Semifinal (Sep 4)
| Pos | Name of Greyhound | SP | Time |
|---|---|---|---|
| 1st | Tyrur McGuigan | 5-2jf | 29.63 |
| 2nd | Barefoot Bullet | 5-2jf | 29.64 |
| 3rd | Krug Ninety Five | 4-1 | 29.92 |
| 4th | Foyle Storm | 10-1 | 30.23 |
| 5th | Ballymac Under | 12-1 | 30.29 |
| 6th | Hats My Boy | 7-2 | 30.46 |

== See also ==
- 2010 UK & Ireland Greyhound Racing Year
