= Arena Racing Company Grand Prix =

Greyhound racing competition

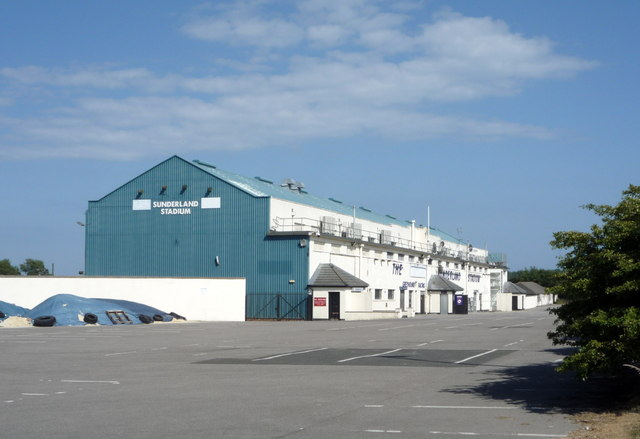
- Sunderland, home of the ARC Grand Prix
- Class: Category 1
- Location: Sunderland
- Inaugurated: 2007
- Sponsor: Arena Racing Company

Race information
- Distance: 640 metres
- Surface: Sand
- Purse: £12,500 (winner)

The Arena Racing Company Grand Prix (formerly the William Hill Grand Prix) is a greyhound racing competition inaugurated in 2007. It was held at Sunderland over 640 metres and formed part of a festival of racing at the track which also included the Classic. The race is not to be confused with the defunct classic race The Grand Prix formerly held at Walthamstow before its closure.

Prize money levels were significant which propelled the race to Category One status but the new stadium owners Arena Racing Company (who bought the stadium in 2017) did not run the event during 2019 and 2020.

== Distances & Venues ==
- 2007–present (Sunderland, 640 metres)

== Sponsors ==
- 2007–2018 (William Hill)
- 2022–present (Arena Racing Company)

== Past winners ==
Year	Winner	Breeding	Trainer	Time (sec)	SP	Notes/ref
2007	Go Edie Honda	Hondo Black – Mind The Way	Graham Hutt (Private)	39.24	2/1f	
2008	Lenson Joker	Kiowa Sweet Trey – Free To Air	Tony Collett (Sittingbourne)	39.29	4/6f	
2009	Crown Rover	Hallucinate – Saleen Chloe	Jimmy Wright (Newcastle)	40.27	2/1	
2010	England Expects	Westmead Hawk – Move Over Marie	Jimmy Wright (Newcastle)	39.50	6/1	
2011	Blonde Fletch	Black Shaw – Glebe Stapler	Mark Wallis (Yarmouth)	39.45	7/4f	
2012	Swabys Princess	Westmead Hawk – Droopys Rena	Paul Young (Romford)	40.49	6/1	
2013	Hometown Honey+ Calzaghe Lilly+	Hometown Boy Nga – Swift Blitz; Droopys Scolari – Flying Winner	Mark Wallis (Yarmouth); Ted Soppitt (Private)	39.95; 39.95	5/1; 1/1f	+dead heat
2014	Farley Rio	Head Bound – Yellow Submarine	Kevin Boon (Yarmouth)	39.40	4/1	
2015	Bubbly Gold	Hondo Black – Spioraid Cath	Paul Young (Romford)	39.79	4/1	
2016	Pinpoint Boom	Shaneboy Lee – Newmarket Way	Kelly Macari (Sunderland)	39.27	2/5f	
2017	Cloran Paddy	Kinloch Brae – Russelena Barbie	Charlie Lister OBE (Private)	39.72	2/1	
2018	Bombers Bullet	Droopys Cain – Headford Hoe	Mark Wallis (Towcester)	39.10	9/4	
2019 to 2020 not held
2021	Coolavanny Bani	Droopys Sydney – Toms Delight	Angela Harrison (Newcastle)	39.21		
2022	Coolavanny Aunty	Droopys Sydney – Yahoo Katie	Angela Harrison (Newcastle)	39.07	4/9f	
2023	Coonough Crow	Eden the Kid – Coonough Dolly	Mark Wallis (Suffolk Downs)	39.40	9/4f	
2024	Farneys Willie	Out Of Range ASB – Rathronan Abbey	Richard Wales (Private)	39.33	9/2	
2025	New Destiny	Grangeview Ten – Coonough Dolly	Mark Wallis (Private)	38.79	2/9f	Track record
