= 2014 Irish Greyhound Derby =

2014 Boylesports Irish Greyhound Derby
- Venue: Shelbourne Park
- Location: Dublin
- Start date: 8 August
- End date: 13 September
- Total prize money: €125,000 (winner)

The 2014 Boylesports Irish Greyhound Derby took place during August and September with the final being held on 13 September 2014 at Shelbourne Park. The winner Laughil Blake picked up the first prize of €125,000 that was on offer. The competition was sponsored by Boylesports.

== Final result ==
At Shelbourne Park (over 550 yards):

Position	Name of Greyhound	Breeding	Trap	Sectional	SP	Finish Time	Trainer
1st	Laughil Blake	Brett Lee - Laughil Lass	6	3.40	4-5f	29.50	Michael O'Donovan
2nd	Turur Sugar Ray	Top Honcho - Maireads Fantasy	1	3.45	5-1	29.64	Patrick 'PJ' Fahy
3rd	Ballymac Vic	Kinloch Brae - Ballymac Vicky	3	3.41	6-1	29.71	Liam Dowling
4th	Vulturi	Westmead Hawk - Ballymac Penske	4	3.54	5-1	29.72	Liam Dowling
5th	Emers Superstar	Hondo Black - Dublinhill Pride	2	3.52	12-1	29.79	Gerry Holian
6th	Borneo	Milldean Panther - Bebo Babe	5	3.39	12-1	30.03	Peter Cronin

=== Distances ===
1¾, ¾, short-head, ¾, 3 (lengths)

=== Competition Race Report ===
The Easter Cup champion Skywalker Farloe was the clear 10-1 favourite in the ante-post betting, followed by newcomer Droopys Nidge at 12–1. The mandatory first round resulted in the elimination of 2012 champion Skywalker Puma who finished lame after a long lay-off through injury and Boylesports Hero also finished lame with a hock injury. The fastest heat winner was Laughil Blake in 29.43.

The James Roche trained Ballyana Foxtrot recorded 29.39 in round two and Cabra Buck, Kereight King, Fiery Splendour and Jaytee Seville were all surprise eliminations. The best third round performance saw Paradise Maverick (Pat Buckley) win his heat in 29.43 and remain unbeaten, in the very next heat Laughil Blake repeated the time and the pair went into the quarter-finals as the new market leaders with Mind The Net and Ballymac Vic just behind. The leading British challenger Holdem Spy was eliminated together with Droopys Nidge and Metro Jack.

Ballymac Vic and Vulturi both won their quarter finals but Paradise Maverick's campaign ended. The third quarter final was the hardest on paper in which Laughil Blake won again from Deanridge Pennys and Droopys Ward whilst Mind The Net went out. The fourth And final heat resulted in an impressive performance by Tyrur Sugar Ray who recorded 29.44 defeating Skywalker Farloe by seven lengths.

Laughil Blake comfortably won the first semi-final with Emers Superstar running on well for second place and Tyrur Sugar Ray claiming the final place to reach a third successive Irish Derby final; the final British challenger Droopys Ward missed out in fourth. The second semi ended with success for Vulturi who caught the leader Borneo, Ballymac Vic took third place to reach a second Irish Derby final.

In the final Laughil Blake deservedly won despite trapping behind Borneo, Ballymac Vic and Tyrur Sugar Ray but he had enough early pace to soon take the lead. Tyrur Sugar Ray was retired to stud soon after the final.

== Quarter finals ==
Heat 1 (Aug 30)
Pos	Name	SP	Time
1st	Ballymac Vic	5-2	29.76
2nd	Borneo	7-1	29.81
3rd	Ivy Hill Prince	10-1	29.99
4th	Shopping Basket	6-1	30.06
5th	Kisses For Cloda	2-1f	30.30
6th	Ballyana Foxtrot	4-1	00.00

Heat 2 (Aug 30)
Pos	Name	SP	Time
1st	Vulturi	6-4f	29.92
2nd	Emers Superstar	4-1	30.37
3rd	Homeless Boy	6-1	30.79
4th	Paradise Maverik	2-1	31.21
5th	Jaytee Osprey	10-1	31.25
6th	Hawaii Kinsale	10-1	31.39

Heat 3 (Aug 30)
Pos	Name	SP	Time
1st	Laughil Blake	6-4f	29.47
2nd	Deanridge Pennys	7-1	29.49
3rd	Droopys Ward	5-1	29.56
4th	El Flutter	12-1	29.80
5th	Mind The Net	7-4	29.98
6th	Killinan Baby	33-1	30.29

Heat 4 (Aug 30)
Pos	Name	SP	Time
1st	Tyrur Sugar Ray	9-4	29.44
2nd	Skywalker Farloe	5-4f	29.93
3rd	Barefoot Angel	6-1	30.03
4th	Thornvalley	10-1	30.14
5th	Green Prince	5-1	30.35
6th	Whizzing Archie	8-1	30.49

== Semi finals ==
First Semi-final (Sep 6)
Pos	Name of Greyhound	SP	Time
1st	Laughil Blake	4-5f	29.41
2nd	Emers Superstar	5-1	29.65
3rd	Tyrur Sugar Ray	3-1	29.76
4th	Droopys Ward	7-1	29.86
5th	Barefoot Angel	12-1	29.90
6th	Homeless Boy	16-1	30.39

Second Semi-final (Sep 6)
Pos	Name of Greyhound	SP	Time
1st	Vulturi	5-1	29.65
2nd	Borneo	5-1	29.72
3rd	Ballymac Vic	6-4f	30.00
4th	Ivy Hill Prince	20-1	30.21
5th	Deanridge Pennys	3-1	30.24
6th	Skywalker Farloe	4-1	30.73

== See also ==
- 2014 UK & Ireland Greyhound Racing Year
