= 2014 UK & Ireland Greyhound Racing Year =

2014 UK & Ireland Greyhound Racing Year was the 89th year of greyhound racing in the United Kingdom and the 88th year of greyhound racing in Ireland.

== Summary ==
=== Tracks ===
The most significant event of the year was the opening of a new track in the form of Towcester on 6 December 2014. Construction on the track had begun in March, backed by the Northamptonshire's racecourse owner Lord Hesketh. Leading trainers joined the track including five times champion trainer Mark Wallis, 2011 champion trainer Chris Allsopp, Kevin Hutton and Matt Dartnall.

The GRA was once again in the news, led by Managing Director Clive Feltham they supported a planning application for housing on Wimbledon Stadium which was against greyhound racing at the track, the other planning application by Paschal Taggart included the facility for greyhound racing. The company then sold the freehold on Belle Vue and Hall Green but retained a fifteen-year lease agreement (with a five-year mutual break clause). Belle Vue was purchased by the Crown Oil Pension Fund for 2.6 million and Hall Green was bought by Euro Property Investments for more than 3 million.

Another company in the spotlight would be Clarke Osborne's Gaming International, who owned Stadia UK, as planning permission was granted for 66 new houses on part of the existing Swindon site with the plan was to use some of the funds to build a new stadium and then the old site would be demolished for 450 homes. Coventry greyhound racing closed suddenly after owner Harry Findlay pulled out, independent racing would take place at the venue at a later date.

=== Competitions ===
The blue riband races went to Salad Dodger, winner of the 2014 English Greyhound Derby and Laughil Blake triumphed in 2014 Irish Greyhound Derby. Following the Derby final there was a series of important announcements, the first came from William Hill who announced a huge sponsorship deal for the 2015 Derby. The winner would receive a record breaking £250,000 prize and then Boylesports stated that they would back the Irish Derby for three years. In a closely fought battle at Sheffield, Paul Young claimed the trainer's championship after picking up three winners on the night with Jaytee China, Mollys Hope and Jaytee Lightning.

Ballymac Eske, arguably the fastest dog in racing, returned to action at Sheffield impressing in the Three Steps to Victory, over three different distances which included a track record over 660 metres. Laurels champion Mileheight Alba defeated Pinpoint Maxi in the final of the William Hill Classic and Ballymac Vic gained a deserved big race victory in the Champions Stakes.

In December Peterborough won the SIS/BAGS track championship final, the event at Nottingham went down to the final race when Peterborough runner Bobs Belter took fifth place in a photo finish which resulted in a one-point win.

Cornamaddy Jumbo winner of the Grand National, Springbok and Champion Hurdle was voted Greyhound of the Year and his trainer Mark Wallis lifted the Trainer of the Year award for the sixth time surpassing Linda Mullins.

=== News ===
The GBGB allowed equal distribution of seeds in open races. Bob Rowe the GRA chief Racing Manager retired and received a special award for services to greyhound racing and the greatest Irish trainer of all time Ger McKenna died. Harlow and former Oxford trainer Maurice Massey also died and Westmead Hawk who had been retired from stud duties died in May.

A €2.8 million rise in funding for the Irish greyhound industry was assigned in the 2015 budget. This increase from €10.8m to €13.6m would be put to use by IGB chairman Phil Meaney but soon after they announced that they would be closing Harolds Cross, due to financial cut backs, in the future.

== Roll of honour ==
Major Winners
Award	Name of Winner
2014 English Greyhound Derby	Salad Dodger
2014 Irish Greyhound Derby	Laughil Blake
Greyhound Trainer of the Year	Mark Wallis
Greyhound of the Year	Cornamaddy Jumbo
Irish Greyhound of the Year	Laughil Blake

Ladbrokes Trainers Championship, Sheffield (25 March)
Pos	Name of Trainer	Points
1st	Paul Young	47
2nd	Charlie Lister OBE	43
3rd	Seamus Cahill	43
4th	Mark Wallis	37
5th	Barrie Draper	36
6th	Chris Allsopp	18

BAGS/SIS Track Championship, Nottingham (23 December)
Pos	Track	Points
1st	Peterborough	55
2nd	Monmore	54
3rd	Hove	47
4th	Newcastle	45
5th	Sittingbourne	41
6th	Sheffield	37

=== Principal UK finals ===
Ladbrokes Golden Jacket, Crayford (22 February, 714m, £17,500)
Pos	Name of Greyhound	Trap	SP	Time	Trainer
1st	Hometown Honey	6	4-6f	45.45	Mark Wallis
2nd	Shanless Becky	5	3-1	45.48	Brendan Cullen
3rd	Midway Nick	1	5-1	45.41	Simon Cull
4th	Boltatwelldigger	3	10-1	45.96	Wayne Wrighting
5th	Sidarian Jaguar	4	8-1	46.16	Ricky Holloway
N/R	Lenson Pele	2		o/c	Tony Collett

Racing Post Scottish Derby, Shawfield (12 April, 480m, £17,500)
Pos	Name of Greyhound	Trap	SP	Time	Trainer
1st	Holdem Spy	6	2-1f	28.87	Carol Weatherall
2nd	Mind The Net	5	5-2	28.90	Pat Buckley
3rd	Toolatetosell	2	20-1	29.23	Heather Dimmock
4th	Calzaghe Jack	4	6-1	29.29	Ted Soppitt
5th	Metro Jack	1	7-2	00.00	Peter Cronin
6th	Jaytee Lightning	3	4-1	00.00	Paul Young

William Hill Classic, Sunderland (9 July, 450m, £25,000)
Pos	Name of Greyhound	Trap	SP	Time	Trainer
1st	Mileheight Alba	1	7-2	26.79	Pat Rosney
2nd	Southern Mesut	3	5-1	26.96	Charlie Lister OBE
3rd	Toolatetosell	2	8-1	27.09	Heather Dimmock
4th	Pinpoint Maxi	6	1-2f	27.24	Kelly Macari
5th	Bush Standard	4	33-1	27.42	Pat Rosney
N/R	Bubbly Rocket	5			Paul Young

William Hill Grand Prix, Sunderland (9 July, 640m, £15,000)
Pos	Name of Greyhound	Trap	SP	Time	Trainer
1st	Farley Rio	3	4-1	39.40	Kevin Boon
2nd	Bubbly Gold	1	1-2f	39.62	Paul Young
3rd	Viking Jack	5	14-1	39.67	Jim Hayton
4th	Ayamzamodel	2	25-1	39.69	Mark Wallis
5th	Dinzeo	4	25-1	39.76	Harry Crapper
6th	Adageo Bob	6	6-1	39.77	Mark Wallis

Roto Roof Windows TV Trophy, Sheffield (6 August, 915m, £8,000)
Pos	Name of Greyhound	Trap	SP	Time	Trainer
1st	King Kane	4	1-1f	55.58 TR	Diane Henry
2nd	Burgess Borna	3	11-2	56.18	John Mullins
3rd	Old Refrain	1	9-4	56.36	Chris Allsopp
4th	Supreme Rossi	2	33-1	56.37	Stuart Buckland
5th	Fearsome Liberty	5	14-1	56.55	Charlie Lister
6th	Swift Vanessa	6	6-1	DNF	Russ Warren

Totepool 69th East Anglian Derby, Yarmouth (17 September, 462m, £15,000)
Pos	Name of Greyhound	Trap	SP	Time	Trainer
1st	Swift Keith	6	9-4f	27.81	John Mullins
2nd	Domino Storm	5	10-1	27.87	Mark Wallis
3rd	Southern Mesut	2	3-1	27.92	Charlie Lister
4th	Rio Quattro	1	7-2	27.94	Daniel Riordan
5th	Forest Gavin	4	12-1	27.95	Kevin Hutton
6th	Sidaz Jack	3	3-1	28.13	Charlie Lister

Chelsea Glass Grand National, Sittingbourne (19 October, 480mH, £8,000)
Pos	Name of Greyhound	Trap	SP	Time	Trainer
1st	Cornamaddy Jumbo	6	1-1f	29.48	Mark Wallis
2nd	Lenson Razldazl	2	7-1	29.52	Ricky Holloway
3rd	Mash Mad Snowy	5	3-1	29.53	Seamus Cahill
4th	Westmead Bertie	1	14-1	29.74	Nick Savva
5th	Newin Hawk	3	11-2	29.79	Ricky Holloway
6th	Alittlelesslip	4	10-1	29.94	Bernie Doyle

William Hill St Leger, Wimbledon (11 November, 687m, £25,000)
Pos	Name of Greyhound	Trap	SP	Time	Trainer
1st	Roxholme Dream	2	7-4f	41.68	Hayley Keightley
2nd	Millwards Teddy	4	9-2	41.91	Dean Childs
3rd	Killieford Khali	3	25-1	42.10	Charlie Lister OBE
4th	Farley Chicken	5	8-1	42.29	Liz McNair
5th	Chicago	1	3-1	42.32	Seamus Cahill
6th	King Kane	6	4-1	42.46	Diane Henry

ECC Timber Oaks, Belle Vue (10 December, 470m, £15,000)
Pos	Name of Greyhound	Trap	SP	Time	Trainer
1st	Cashen Maureen	5	4-6f	27.99	Mark Wallis
2nd	Bromwich Sue	3	14-1	28.26	Lynn Cook
3rd	Jaytee Osprey	1	5-1	28.31	Paul Young
4th	Greenwell Lark	6	5-1	28.60	Pat Flaherty
5th	Evanta Evita	4	4-1	28.68	Mark Wallis
6th	Alma Chic	2	33-1	28.93	Alec Stone

ECC Timber Laurels, Belle Vue (10 December, 470m, £6,000)
Pos	Name of Greyhound	Trap	SP	Time	Trainer
1st	Jordans Brianna	5	5-1	28.28	Charlie Lister OBE
2nd	Bubbly Rocket	4	4-1	28.73	Paul Young
3rd	Southern Mesut	2	4-1	28.84	Charlie Lister OBE
4th	Invitation Shaw	3	6-1	29.05	Kevin Hutton
5th	Blue Moment	6	7-1	29.06	Mark Wallis
6th	Pinpoint Maxi	1	13-8f	00.00	Kelly Macari

=== Principal Irish finals ===
Dandelion Bar & Nightclub Easter Cup, Shelbourne (12 April, 550y, €25,000)
Pos	Name of Greyhound	Trap	SP	Time	Trainer
1st	Skywalker Farloe	5	2-1	29.63	Frances O’Donnell
2nd	Tyrur Sugar Ray	1	5-4f	29.68	PJ Fahy
3rd	Skywalker Legend	3	20-1	29.93	Frances O’Donnell
4th	Insane Spartacus	6	25-1	29.96	Paul Corrigan
5th	Tyrur Arthur	2	7-1	30.07	PJ Fahy
6th	Cabra Buck	4	4-1	30.31	Graham Holland

Con & Anne Kirby Memorial Stakes, Limerick (26 April, 525y, €80,000)
Pos	Name of Greyhound	Trap	SP	Time	Trainer
1st	Boylesports Hero	6	5-4f	28.31	Brendan Matthews
2nd	Crokers Champ	3	9-2	28.55	Peter Cronin
3rd	Vans Viking	4	7-2	28.73	Graham Holland
4th	Pennys Deanridge	1	16-1	28.76	Rosemary Price
5th	Ivy Hill Prince	2	9-2	28.77	Pat Curtin
6th	Green Prince	5	4-1	29.05	Liam Dowling

B.I.F National Produce, Clonmel (8 June, 525y, €30,000)
Pos	Name of Greyhound	Trap	SP	Time	Trainer
1st	Boylesports Hero	6	5-4f	28.35	Brendan Matthews
2nd	Midtown Raffa	3	4-1	28.45	Maurice O’Connor
3rd	Slick Satellite	4	8-1	28.63	Pat Buckley
4th	Emils Banjo	1	2-1	28.66	Mike Bandurak
5th	Laughil Blake	5	5-2	28.73	Michael O’Donovan
6th	Razldazl Danann	2	10-1	28.80	Dolores Ruth

Sporting Press Oaks, Shelbourne (21 June, 525y, €25,000)
Pos	Name of Greyhound	Trap	SP	Time	Trainer
1st	Velvet All Jam	4	2-1	28.42	Mike Buckley
2nd	Always With Me	1	5-1	28.47	Joe Mcilhone
3rd	Borna Gem	2	6-4f	28.79	Ruairi Dwan
4th	Cantkeepmein	6	8-1	29.03	John McGee Sr.
5th	Ridgedale Look	5	12-1	29.21	Declan Sexton
6th	Brenval Star	3	6-1	29.28	Graham Holland

Hamilton Architects Champion Stakes, Shelbourne (26 July, 550y, €20,000)
Pos	Name of Greyhound	Trap	SP	Time	Trainer
1st	Ballymac Vic	5	9-4f	29.97	Liam Dowling
2nd	Tyrur Nathan	6	7-1	30.00	PJ Fahy
3rd	Tyrur Sugar Ray	2	4-1	30.04	PJ Fahy
4th	Indigo Jack	3	4-1	30.09	Darragh Morrissey
5th	Deanridge Pennys	4	6-1	30.14	Rosemary Price
6th	Vimmerby	1	3-1	30.20	John Kavanagh

Dublin Coach Puppy Derby, Harolds Cross (17 October, 525y, €22,500)
Pos	Name of Greyhound	Trap	SP	Time	Trainer
1st	Quietly	2	7-1	28.74	Ian Reilly
2nd	Farloe Blitz	4	4-5f	28.84	Owen McKenna
3rd	Dolcino Flyer	5	6-1	29.05	Pat Buckley
4th	Blonde Nipper	6	5-1	29.16	Fraser Black
5th	Coolavanny List	3	28-1	29.23	Matt Dartnall
6th	Minglers Trio	1	11-2	29.58	James Moore

Connolly's Red Mills Laurels, Cork (18 October, 525y, €30,000)
Pos	Name of Greyhound	Trap	SP	Time	Trainer
1st	Vimmerby	4	3-1	28.56	John Kavanagh
2nd	Sidarian Blaze	2	6-4f	28.84	Graham Holland
3rd	Nellies Flyer	6	8-1	29.08	John Kiely
4th	Farloe Calvin	1	7-2	29.10	Owen McKenna
5th	Vans Viking	3	7-2	29.17	Graham Holland
6th	Champagne Jackie	5	9-1	29.28	Darragh Morrissey

Kerry Agribusiness Irish St Leger, Limerick (22 November, 550y, €25,000)
Pos	Name of Greyhound	Trap	SP	Time	Trainer
1st	Paradise Silva	2	6-4f	29.50	Pat Buckley
2nd	Ballyana Foxtrot	6	3-1	29.67	James Roche
3rd	Vulturi	1	5-2	29.92	Liam Dowling
4th	Burgess Oscar	5	6-1	29.93	Sheila Spillane/JJ Fennelly
5th	Castleivy Crash	3	5-1	30.14	Denis P O’Malley
6th	Borna Central	4	10-1	30.24	Michael Dwan
