= 2009 Irish Greyhound Derby =

2009 Paddy Power Irish Greyhound Derby
- Venue: Shelbourne Park
- Location: Dublin
- Start date: 5 August
- End date: 12 September
- Total prize money: €170,000 (winner)

The 2009 Irish Greyhound Derby took place during August and September with the final being held at Shelbourne Park in Dublin on 12 September 2009.

The winner College Causeway won €175,000 and was trained by Pat Buckley, owned by the Mike & Vincent McKenna and bred by Frank Culloty. The race was sponsored by the Paddy Power.

== Final result ==
At Shelbourne, 12 September (over 550 yards):

Position	Winner	Breeding	Trap	Sectional	SP	Time	Trainer
1st	College Causeway	Go Wild Teddy - College Tina	5	3.57	5-4f	29.53	Pat Buckley
2nd	Oran Classic	Top Honcho - Jo Bluebell	2	3.48	11-2	29.67	John 'Ginger' McGee Sr.
3rd	Cashen Legend	Balintore Brave - Fergus Gold	4	3.54	7-1	29.77	Chris Houlihan
4th	Faypoint Man	Yeah Man - Go Wild Donna	3	3.55	9-2	29.98	Owen McKenna
5th	Shaneboy Lee	Brett Lee - Shaneboy Ruth	6	3.59	4-1	30.16	Denis Kiely
6th	Belvedere Champ	Droopys Maldini - Belvedere Tina	1	3.63	25-1	30.17	Michael O'Donovan

=== Distances ===
1½, 1¼, 2½, 1¾, 2¼, short-head (lengths)

== Competition report ==
College Causeway (a 2008 semi-finalist) broke the track record setting a new mark of 29.21 in the first round and is cut from 16–1 to 8–1 to win the competition. Defending champion Shelbourne Aston went out in round two. The challenge of Scottish Greyhound Derby winner Cabra Cool ended in round two and Champion stakes winner Fatboyz Nodrog was eliminated in round three but Easter Cup champion Droopys Joel made it to the quarter-finals.

Three of the quarter-finals were won by Royal Tornado, Cashen Legend and Oran Classic with Droopys Noel managing only fourth. College Causeway continued his winning ways and securing a fourth successive victory in 29.47, the best of the round.

In the semi-finals College Causeway beat Shaneboy Lee and Oran Classic; Slip the Lark was eliminated as was Mid West Blue who went out at the same stage as he did the previous year. Cashen Legend defeated Faypoint Man and Belvedere Champ in the second semi-final in a time of 29.87.

When the traps opened in the final Oran Classic from trap two forged out a good lead by halfway, Cashen Legend was prominent but College Causeway was positioned last out of the second bend before slipping inside some of the field by halfway. Oran Classic had a good lead but by the fourth bend College Causeway was making ground. College Causeway went passed Oran Classic on the run-in to complete an unbeaten campaign. Buckley dominated throughout the derby having 5 of the 8 heat winners in the 3rd round while College Causeway remained unbeaten throughout the derby and broke the track record in the opening round.

== Quarter finals ==
Heat 1 (Aug 29)
Pos	Name	SP	Time
1st	College Causeway	11-10f	29.47
2nd	Shaneboy Lee	5-2	29.68
3rd	Belvedere Champ	14-1	29.92
4th	Deanridge Fury	7-1	29.98
5th	Contador	12-1	30.12
6th	Mecano	7-1	30.40

Heat 2 (Aug 29)
Pos	Name	SP	Time
1st	Cashen Legend	7-1	29.82
2nd	Slip The Lark	3-1	29.96
3rd	Three One Three	20-1	30.06
4th	Corporate Attack	14-1	30.07
5th	St Louis Spirit	7-4f	30.21
6th	Tyrur Giovanni	3-1	30.32

Heat 3 (Aug 29)
Pos	Name	SP	Time
1st	Oran Classic	6-1	29.65
2nd	Faypoint Man	4-5f	29.70
3rd	Mid West Blue	10-1	29.84
4th	Droopys Noel	5-1	29.95
5th	Global Hope	20-1	30.00
6th	Magna Venturer	5-1	30.02

Heat 4 (Aug 29)
Pos	Name	SP	Time
1st	Royal Tornado	9-2	29.73
2nd	Airport Pilot	5-1	29.87
3rd	Group Skater	25-1	29.94
4th	Mesedo Blue	9-4	30.08
5th	Scolari Me Daddy	2-1f	30.29
6th	Must Be Keano	6-1	30.30

== Semi finals ==
First Semi-final (Sep 5)
Pos	Name of Greyhound	SP	Time
1st	College Causeway	9-10f	29.53
2nd	Shaneboy Lee	7-2	29.67
3rd	Oran Classic	6-1	29.72
4th	Slip The Lark	4-1	29.83
5th	Mid West Blue	20-1	29.93
6th	Group Skater	33-1	29.94

Second Semi-final (Sep 5)
Pos	Name of Greyhound	SP	Time
1st	Cashen Legend	7-2	29.63
2nd	Faypoint Man	1-1f	29.64
3rd	Belvedere Champ	14-1	29.92
4th	Airport Pilot	7-1	30.23
5th	Three One Three	16-1	30.29
6th	Royal Tornado	7-2	30.46

== See also ==
- 2009 UK & Ireland Greyhound Racing Year
