= 2009 English Greyhound Derby =

Greyhound racing event

- Location: Wimbledon Stadium
- Start date: 1 May
- End date: 30 May
- Total prize money: £100,000 (winner)

The 2009 Blue Square Greyhound Derby took place during May with the final being held on 30 May 2009 at Wimbledon Stadium. The winner Kinda Ready received £100,000.

== Final result ==
At Wimbledon (over 480 metres):

Position	Name of Greyhound	Breeding	Trap	Sectional	SP	Time	Trainer
1st	Kinda Ready	Just the Best – Kinda Sleepy	5	5.02	25-1	28.65	Mark Wallis (Harlow)
2nd	Fear Zafonic	Premier Fantasy – Farloe Oyster	1	4.89	3-1	28.68	Charlie Lister OBE (Private)
3rd	Wise Thought	Climate Control – Sierra Mist	6	4.96	5-2	28.93	Martin White (Private)
4th	Farloe Reason	Droopys Maldini – Farloe Oyster	3	4.94	6-1	29.06	Charlie Lister OBE (Private)
5th	Ballymac Ruso	Ballymac Maeve – Ballymac Lark	2	4.90	2-1f	29.21	Matt Dartnall (Coventry)
6th	Glenard Sunrise	Hades Rocket – Mossley Jo	4	5.10	10-1	29.32	Matt Dartnall (Coventry)

=== Distances ===
Neck, 3, 1½, 1¾, 1½ (lengths)
The distances between the greyhounds are in finishing order and shown in lengths. One length is equal to 0.08 of one second.

=== Race report ===
It took five rounds of action to narrow down the field to the final six greyhounds. Kinda Ready was the eventual winner, after picking up Fear Zafonic near the line. The rest of the field encountered crowding leaving the front two to battle it out. An April 2007 whelp, Kinda Ready was the youngest in the final, and was also the biggest price winner in the history of the Derby at Wimbledon. And biggest since 1975 at White City the previous home of the derby. This year also saw no Irish trained greyhounds in the final with last year's Irish Greyhound Derby winner Shelbourne Aston bowing out in the quarter-finals.

== Quarter-finals ==
Heat 1 (19 May)
Pos	Name	SP	Time
1st	Wise Thought	4-5f	28.69
2nd	Jogadusc Ace	20-1	28.79
3rd	Love Mac	10-1	29.13
4th	Deanridge Fury	5-1	29.28
5th	Ja Mann	5-2	29.51
6th	Kylegrove Cougar	25-1	29.54

Heat 2 (19 May)
Pos	Name	SP	Time
1st	Bubbly Maestro	7-1	28.53
2nd	Cabra Boss	7-2	28.75
3rd	Kinda Ready	2-1f	29.00
4th	Kindred Sparky	6-1	29.06
5th	Cabra Fly	3-1	29.13
6th	Droopys Quinta	8-1	29.22

Heat 3 (19 May)
Pos	Name	SP	Time
1st	Ballymac Ruso	4-1	28.51
2nd	Farloe Reason	4-1	28.57
3rd	Fear Zafonic	3-1jf	28.75
4th	Shelbourne Aston	4-1	28.79
5th	Greenwell River	8-1	28.86
6th	Bandicoot Tipoki	3-1jf	28.91

Heat 4 (19 May)
Pos	Name	SP	Time
1st	Glenard Sunrise	5-2	28.77
2nd	Shelbourne Denny	14-1	29.12
3rd	Stop The Show	16-1	29.16
4th	Marbeck Wonder	8-1	29.32
5th	Romeo Turbo	12-1	29.40
6th	Windy Millar	1-2f	29.48

== Semifinals ==
First Semifinal (23 May)
Pos	Name of Greyhound	SP	Time	Trainer
1st	Ballymac Ruso	7-4f	28.59	Dartnall
2nd	Wise Thought	9-4	28.60	Philpott
3rd	Fear Zafonic	9-4	28.66	Lister
4th	Stop The Show	25-1	28.68	Simpson
5th	Shelbourne Denny	25-1	28.78	Curtin
6th	Jogadusc Ace	12-1	28.85	Wallis

Second Semifinal (23 May)
Pos	Name of Greyhound	SP	Time	Trainer
1st	Glenard Sunrise	3-1	28.77	Dartnall
2nd	Kinda Ready	8-1	28.90	Wallis
3rd	Farloe Reason	5-4f	28.97	Lister
4th	Cabra Boss	5-1	28.98	McNair
5th	Love Mac	16-1	29.08	Locke
6th	Bubbly Maestro	3-1	29.15	Young

== See also ==
- 2009 UK & Ireland Greyhound Racing Year
