= 2007 UK & Ireland Greyhound Racing Year =

2007 UK & Ireland Greyhound Racing Year was the 82nd year of greyhound racing in the United Kingdom and the 81st year of greyhound racing in Ireland.

== Summary ==
Two time English Greyhound Derby champion Westmead Hawk was aimed towards a third Derby attempt after recovering from injury over the winter. His trainer Nick Savva and owner Bob Morton sent him to Monmore for two races on 3 and 10 May and then Wimbledon on 19 and 26 May. After finishing second in the Derby Trial Stake on 26 May his connections decided not to go for a third Derby and retired him to stud.

The 2007 English Greyhound Derby progressed without Westmead Hawk and was won by his kennelmate Westmead Lord. The Irish equivalent went to Tyrur Rhino for trainer Paul Hennessy who recorded a 1-2 when Tyrur Laurel finished runner-up.

Charlie Lister won his fourth trainers title.

A builder called David Smith killed thousands of greyhounds with a captive bolt gun, charging £10 a time. Smith was fined £2,000 "under legislation used to restrict the dumping of waste", after police said he had committed no offence Subsequently, anyone found to have sent a greyhound to him was warned off for life by the GBGB.

=== Tracks ===
Brough Park underwent a re-branding by their owners William Hill Bookmakers and would now be known as Newcastle. This was possible due to the fact that it was the only greyhound track remaining in Newcastle; White City, Gateshead and Gosforth had all previously existed in the city. Sister track Sunderland was the recipient of a significant prize money increase as plans were announced that a new festival would be held. It included the William Hill Classic offering a £40,000 winner's prize and the William Hill Grand Prix for £25,000.

Dundalk unveiled the all-weather horse track to go alongside the new greyhound track costing a further €24 million. The total improvements had cost €35million. Three independent tracks closed, Wisbech, Bedwellty and Hinckley, the latter was sold to developers.

=== Competitions ===
Charlie Lister won the Trainers championship at Hall Green and then trained Fear Haribo to the Scottish Greyhound Derby title at Shawfield, in a track record time.

Mahers Boy trained by Elaine Parker claimed the first ever William Hill Classic and Go Edie Honda picked up the Grand Prix title. Spiridon Louis took the St Leger crown and would go on to be voted Greyhound of the Year after also winning the Regency, the TV Trophy and setting track records at Yarmouth and Walthamstow. Top Honcho won the Irish Greyhound Review Stud Dog of the Year Award for a record sixth time.

=== News ===
At an NGRC enquiry, Belle Vue veterinary surgeon Paul Evans was found guilty of supplying incorrect season suppressants which led to a feud between the Royal Veterinary College and the NGRC.

Wimbledon trainer Ray Peacock died after a car accident, the Keston based Peacock aged 52 had been taken to East Surrey Hospital in Redhill but had been pronounced dead on arrival. Walthamstow trainer Gary Baggs relinquished his licence to concentrate on his battle against cancer and switched his licence to daughter Stacey. Top open race trainer Terry Dartnall handed his licence to his son Matt and Wimbledon Racing Manager Derek Hope left to join William Hill and was replaced by Gary Matthews.

== Roll of honour ==
Major Winners
Award	Name of Winner
2007 English Greyhound Derby	Westmead Lord
2007 Irish Greyhound Derby	Tyrur Rhino
Greyhound Trainer of the Year	Charlie Lister
Greyhound of the Year	Spiridon Louis
Irish Dog and Bitch of the Year	Catunda Harry / Ms Firecracker

Betfair Trainers Championship, Hall Green (Mar 20)
Pos	Name of Trainer	Points
1st	Charlie Lister	55
2nd	Mark Wallis	52
3rd	John Mullins	37
4th	Brian Clemenson	31
5th	Seamus Cahill	18
6th	Ernest Gaskin Jr.	15

=== Principal UK finals ===
John R Weir Mercedes Benz Scottish Derby, Shawfield (Apr 14, 480m, £20,000)
Pos	Name of Greyhound	Trainer	SP	Time	Trap
1st	Fear Haribo	Charlie Lister	10-11f	28.76+	5
2nd	Groovy Stan	Paul Hennessy	5-2	28.88	1
3rd	Greenwell Storm	Patrick Flaherty	6-1	29.02	4
4th	Kylegrove Top	Julie Bateson	6-1	29.08	3
5th	Manic Mile	Graham Hutt	10-1	29.18	6
6th	Breeze Hill Juli	Pat Rosney	20-1	29.26	2

+ Track record

Betfair Grand National, Wimbledon (May 8, 460mH, £7,500)
Pos	Name of Greyhound	Trainer	SP	Time	Trap
1st	Jos Cigar	Steve Willey	9-4	28.07	6
2nd	Ardbeg Hurricane	Jim Reynolds	7-1	28.41	5
3rd	Nevada Blue	Otto Kueres	7-2	28.47	1
4th	Fionntra Jo	Gary Baggs	25-1	28.67	3
5th	Snazzy Time	Seamus Cahill	6-4f	28.73	2
6th	Strong Flow	Gary Baggs	8-1	28.81	4

William Hill Classic, Sunderland (May 22, 450m, £40,000)
Pos	Name of Greyhound	Trainer	SP	Time	Trap
1st	Mahers Boy	Elaine Parker	9-4jf	26.77	1
2nd	Groovy Stan	Paul Hennessy	9-4jf	26.78	2
3rd	Astronomic	Owen McKenna	5-1	27.01	3
4th	Velvet Eldorado	Pat Buckley	14-1	27.12	5
5th	Four Dubs	Pat Buckley	5-2	27.25	4
6th	Droopys Tops	Chris Lund	25-1	27.51	6

William Hill Grand Prix, Sunderland (May 22, 640m, £20,000)
Pos	Name of Greyhound	Trainer	SP	Time	Trap
1st	Go Edie Honda	Graham Hutt	2-1f	39.24	1
2nd	Romford Car Two	John Mullins	3-1	39.28	4
3rd	Farloe Premier	Charlie Lister	7-2	39.44	3
4th	Dromana Blue	Paul Hennessy	3-1	39.45	5
5th	Boherash Patriot	Graham Hutt	16-1	39.62	6
6th	Blonde Zak	John Mullins	20-1	39.70	2

Betfair Scurry Cup, Perry Barr (May 31, 275m, £8,000)
Pos	Name of Greyhound	Trainer	SP	Time	Trap
1st	Horseshoe Ping	Jim Reynolds	4-11f	16.19	5
2nd	Freight Train	David Pruhs	9-2	16.31	1
3rd	Ladywell Trick	Heather Dimmock	9-1	16.49	6
4th	Pineapple Gene	Lynn Cook	8-1	00.00	3
5th	Wheres Yer Man	Peter Rich	8-1	00.00	2
N/R	Oh His Nerves	Bob Hall			4

William Hill TV Trophy, Yarmouth (June 5, 843m, £6,000)
Pos	Name of Greyhound	Trainer	SP	Time	Trap
1st	Spiridon Louis	Lorraine Sams	4-7f	53.42	2
2nd	Wise Susie	Dave Smith	28-1	53.50	1
3rd	Mitzie	Mick Puzey	18-1	54.00	6
4th	Bubbly Kate	Brian Clemenson	7-2	54.01	3
5th	Head Iton Jordan	Daniel Talbot	4-1	54.21	5
6th	Confident Foe	Alan Stevens	20-1	54.35	4

William Hill Cesarewitch, Oxford (Jun 12, 645m, £5,000)
Pos	Name of Greyhound	Trainer	SP	Time	Trap
1st	Dark Hondo	Paul Foster	5-4f	39.94	4
2nd	Evergreenclassic	Heather Dimmock	10-1	40.05	5
3rd	Lifes Lukey	Brian Clemenson	4-1	40.12	2
4th	Droopys Riquelme	Brian Clemenson	5-1	40.13	6
5th	Ace Mentor	Nick Colton	5-2	40.21	3
N/R	Swift Maybole	John Mullins			1

VC Bet Grand Prix, Walthamstow (Sep 4, 640m, £15,000)
Pos	Name of Greyhound	Trainer	SP	Time	Trap
1st	Foulden Special	Derek Knight	1-1f	39.45	6
2nd	Calzaghe Frisby	Ted Soppitt	7-1	39.47	2
3rd	Fear Robben	Mark Wallis	2-1	39.50	4
4th	Shelbourne Laura	Charlie Lister	8-1	39.66	1
5th	White Bomber	Tony Collett	20-1	39.69	3
6th	Shelbourne Ryan	Mark Wallis	25-1	39.91	5

Totesport Gold Collar, Belle Vue (Sep 25, 590m, £10,000)
Pos	Name of Greyhound	Trainer	SP	Time	Trap
1st	Vatican Jinky	Pat Rosney	9-2	35.06+	3
2nd	Two Nicks	Laurence Tuffin	7-2	35.44	4
3rd	Boherash Pilot	Graham Hutt	9-2	35.48	5
4th	Cailins Pesto	Darren Hampson	12-1	35.62	6
5th	Go Edie Honda	Graham Hutt	7-4f	35.76	1
6th	Fear Robben	Mark Wallis	7-2	36.06	2

+ Track record

Reading Masters, Reading (Sep 30, 465m, £20,000)
Pos	Name of Greyhound	Trainer	SP	Time	Trap
1st	Blitz	Denis Stevenson	4-1	28.03	6
2nd	Blonde Jeannie	John Mullins	4-1	28.17	2
3rd	Fear Haribo	Charlie Lister	7-4f	28.21	3
4th	Vipar Totti	Alison Ingram	8-1	28.41	5
5th	Brickfield Class	Bob Gilling	7-2	28.53	1
6th	Mulcair Jo	Nick Colton	20-1	28.75	4

Betfred Laurels, Belle Vue (Oct 9, 470m, £10,000)
Pos	Name of Greyhound	Trainer	SP	Time	Trap
1st	Kylegrove Top	Julie Bateson	10-1	27.82	2
2nd	Barnfield On Air	Sam Poots	2-7f	27.92	1
3rd	Droopys Wells	Liz McNair	10-1	28.28	6
4th	Highfield Hondo	Pat Rosney	16-1	28.38	3
5th	Boherna On Air	Barrie Draper	7-1	28.44	5
6th	Meenala Cruiser	Julie Bateson	16-1	28.52	4

William Hill St Leger, Wimbledon (Oct 30, 668m, £13,000)
Pos	Name of Greyhound	Trainer	SP	Time	Trap
1st	Spiridon Louis	Lorraine Sams	4-1	40.86	3
2nd	Lenson Joker	Tony Collett	4-1	40.92	4
3rd	Westmead Aoifa	Nick Savva	9-4f	40.98	6
4th	Directors Chair	Mark Wallis	6-1	41.13	2
5th	Bubbly Venus	Paul Young	4-1	41.19	5
6th	Iceman Brutus	Lance Burford	7-1	41.25	1

William Hill Oaks, Wimbledon (Dec 18, 480m, £6,000)
Pos	Name of Greyhound	Trainer	SP	Time	Trap
1st	Blonde Jeannie	John Mullins	2-1	28.76	1
2nd	Broadway Sizzler	Sean White	6-4f	29.01	2
3rd	Lethal Frankie	Seamus Cahill	33-1	29.19	5
4th	Dilemmas Flight	Nick Savva	7-2	29.28	4
5th	Jazz Hurricane	Derek Knight	9-2	29.30	6
6th	Dawn Cranz	Peter Billingham	33-1	29.44	3

=== Principal Irish finals ===
Donal Reilly Easter Cup, Shelbourne (Apr 21, 550y, €50,000)
Pos	Name of Greyhound	Trainer	SP	Time	Trap
1st	Ardkill Jamie	Paul Hennessy	4-1	28.30	4
2nd	Razldazl Billy	Dolores Ruth	7-4f	28.32	5
3rd	Loyal Honcho	Seamus Graham	3-1	28.72	6
4th	Aries Son	Mary Buggy	20-1	28.73	3
5th	Ballyhoe Marble	Francie Murray	5-1	29.53	1
6th	Holborn Post	Keeley McGee	9-2	29.65	2

Red Mills Produce, Clonmel (May 6, 525y, €30,000)
Pos	Name of Greyhound	Trainer	SP	Time	Trap
1st	Green Heat	Liam Dowling	4-1	28.78	2
2nd	Tedso	Mossie O'Connor	8-1	28.79	1
3rd	Team Captain	Reggie Roberts	11-8f	28.82	4
4th	Trade Plate	Michael O'Donovan	3-1	29.10	6
5th	Cherokee Playboy	Ann Wade	5-1	29.17	3
6th	Assassin	Graham Holland	10-1	29.42	5

Kerry Agribusiness Irish St Leger, Limerick (Jun 23, 550y, €35,000)
Pos	Name of Greyhound	Trainer	SP	Time	Trap
1st	Lughill Jo	Owen McKenna	3-1	29.37	4
2nd	Tyrur Rocky	Paul Hennessy	3-1	29.57	5
3rd	Tyrur Brett	Paul Hennessy	3-1	29.81	3
4th	Bar The Devil	Noel Mullins	6-4f	29.89	1
5th	Monsoon Jack	George Roche	12-1	30.13	6
6th	Skywalker Duke	Frances O'Donnell	16-1	30.25	2

Sporting Press Oaks, Shelbourne (Jun 30, 525y, €35,000)
Pos	Name of Greyhound	Trainer	SP	Time	Trap
1st	Ms Firecracker	Patrick Guilfoyle	10-1	28.54	1
2nd	Alexandrova	Pat Kelly	8-11f	28.58	6
3rd	Tyrur Margaret	Paul Hennessy	6-1	28.94	3
4th	Sly Fox	John Murray	6-1	28.98	5
5th	Tyrur Jean	Paul Hennessy	25-1	29.04	2
6th	Mustang Miranda	Owen McKenna	5-1	29.10	4

Boylesports Champion Stakes, Shelbourne (Jul 28, 550y, €40,000)
Pos	Name of Greyhound	Trainer	SP	Time	Trap
1st	Razldazl Billy	Dolores Ruth	6-4f	29.72	6
2nd	Tyrur Bertie	Paul Hennessy	12-1	29.88	5
3rd	Goldstar Lee	Eddie Wade	7-1	29.89	3
4th	Si Senor	Owen McKenna	9-4	29.93	2
5th	Bar The Devil	Noel Mullins	6-1	30.13	1
6th	Micks Savings	Pat Buckley	10-1	30.15	4

HX Bookmakers Puppy Derby, Harolds Cross (Oct 5, 525y, €35,000)
Pos	Name of Greyhound	Trainer	SP	Time	Trap
1st	Royal Treason	Ollie Bray	3-1	29.12	5
2nd	Kryptonite	Ollie Bray	5-2f	29.13	2
3rd	Ballymac Penske	Liam Dowling	3-1	29.19	6
4th	Corridor Sprint	Casey	33-1	29.21	1
5th	Head Man Boo	Martin Quinn	5-1	30.09	4
6th	Outandgoodnight	Ger Manson	4-1	00.00	3

Cashmans Laurels, Cork (Oct 20, 525y, €35,000)
Pos	Name of Greyhound	Trainer	SP	Time	Trap
1st	Catunda Harry	Owen McKenna	5-4f	28.18	3
2nd	Tyrur Laurel	Paul Hennessy	3-1	28.38	6
3rd	Rockingham	Janet Downes	12-1	28.70	2
4th	Spider Said	O'Donovan	7-2	28.90	1
5th	Fargo Star	D Leahy	20-1	29.14	5
N/R	Droopys Robinho	Fraser Black			4
