= 2009 UK & Ireland Greyhound Racing Year =

2009 UK & Ireland Greyhound Racing Year was the 84th year of greyhound racing in the United Kingdom and the 83rd year of greyhound racing in Ireland.

== Roll of honour ==
Major Winners
Award	Name of Winner
2009 English Greyhound Derby	Kinda Ready
2009 Irish Greyhound Derby	College Causeway
Greyhound Trainer of the Year	Mark Wallis
Greyhound of the Year	Fear Zafonic
Irish Dog and Bitch of the Year	College Causeway / Skywalker Queen

== Summary ==
The British Greyhound Racing Board and the National Greyhound Racing Club merged to form a new organisation called the Greyhound Board of Great Britain (G.B.G.B). The remit was the same in regard to rules and regulations and the promotion of the sport, but there were significant changes in regard to the welfare of the greyhounds. One of the new rules brought in was the requirement for every greyhound to be microchipped and drug tested before it was allowed to set foot on any track for a qualifying trial. The merger allowed the governing body to track every greyhound registered to race on licensed tracks and would help combat the small minority that abused welfare rules. The new Chief Executive of the G.B.G.B would be former Olympic field hockey gold medallist Ian Taylor, well known as the goalkeeper in the famous 1988 Seoul Games. He would only stay in the position for a relatively short time, however, and saw the bookmakers' levy decreasing; it dropped £2 million to £10 million in total.

The industry in Ireland hit a brick wall with the Sports Minister Martin Cullen announcing a 13% funding reduction on Irish racing. Paddy Power subsequently announced they were withdrawing their Derby sponsorship. Attendances were down 12% and tote betting down 8%.

The two leading prizes of the English Greyhound Derby and Irish Greyhound Derby went to Kinda Ready and College Causeway respectively.

Fear Zafonic went on to win the greyhound of the year after securing the East Anglian Derby. Mark Wallis won the most open races points and the trainers title for the third time.

=== Tracks ===
Two tracks closed; on 17 June it was announced that the Boulevard in Hull would close to greyhound racing once again after less than two years trading. After going to once a week racing, promoter Dave Marshall pulled the plug on funding for the stadium and the last meeting was on 27 June.

Coventry closed after Boxing Day with the company going into liquidation. It closed on a sour note with the Racing Manager Russ Watkin fined £5,000 for allowing 67 races to go off before their official race time.

Ballyskeagh in Lisburn, County Antrim, Northern Ireland reopened under a new name and would be known as Drumbo Park. It is known as the New Grosvenor Stadium during the daytime football matches, and changes to Drumbo Park for the Greyhounds in the evening.

=== Competitions ===
The GRA made more cuts including trimming their major race fixtures. The last Gold Collar and Gorton Cup were held at Belle Vue Stadium. The Scurry Gold Cup had been switched from Perry Barr Stadium earlier in the year to Belle Vue.

The Scottish Greyhound Derby featured five Irish hounds in the final and the event was won by Cabra Cool. On the same night as the final, Greenwell River set a new track record of 28.66 in the invitation race.

=== News ===
Geoff De Mulder, one of the all-time great trainers, died aged 79. The 'Wizard of Meriden', who had been ill for some time, sent out two English Greyhound Derby winners, a Scottish Greyhound Derby, the Welsh Greyhound Derby and four consolation Derby events. He sent out 14 Derby finalists and won a whole host of other major races.

Track bookmaker Tony Morris stood for the last time at Wimbledon and top greyhounds Lenson Joker, Horseshoe Ping and Flying Winner were all retired, the latter had broken eight track records.

Betfair Trainers Championship, Sheffield (Mar 17)
Pos	Name of Trainer	Points
1st	Charlie Lister	66
2nd	Mark Wallis	37
3rd	Barrie Draper	31
4th	Pat Rosney	29
4th	Seamus Cahill	24
6th	John Mullins	20

=== Principal UK finals ===
Stan James Grand National, Wimbledon (Apr 7, 480mH, £7,500)
Pos	Name of Greyhound	Trainer	SP	Time	Trap
1st	Hotdog Jack	Seamus Cahill	2-1f	28.49	1
2nd	Distant Legend	Julie Power	5-1	28.63	6
3rd	Nebuchadnezzar	Lorraine Sams	9-2	28.77	4
4th	The Other Outlaw	Jason Foster	7-1	28.90	3
5th	Mall Byte	Lorraine Sams	8-1	29.12	5
6th	Platinumlancelot	Jason Foster	5-2	29.15	2

Bettor.com Scottish Derby, Shawfield (Apr 11, 480m, £25,000)
Pos	Name of Greyhound	Trainer	SP	Time	Trap
1st	Cabra Cool	Pat Buckley	4-1	28.83	1
2nd	Daleys Buzz	Paul Hennessy	20-1	29.09	5
3rd	Target Classic	Seamus McGarry	6-1	29.11	2
4th	Forest Master	Fraser Black	8-1	29.17	4
5th	Thurlesbeg Joker	Barrie Draper	5-4f	29.23	6
6th	Must Be Keano	Fraser Black	11-4	29.27	3

Showsec Scurry Cup, Belle Vue (June 9, 260m, £6,000)
Pos	Name of Greyhound	Trainer	SP	Time	Trap
1st	Centaur Allstar	Chris Allsopp	7-4f	15.10	4
2nd	Officer Donagh	Chris Allsopp	11-4	15.24	6
3rd	Matts Mentor	David Pruhs	4-1	15.28	3
4th	Ping The Lids	Andy Heyes	5-1	15.36	5
5th	Farloe Ferdinand	Paddy Curtin UK	11-1	15.40	2
6th	Jethart Jackie	Julie Bateson	5-1	15.46	1

William Hill TV Trophy, Newcastle (June 24, 895m, £6,000)
Pos	Name of Greyhound	Trainer	SP	Time	Trap
1st	Midway Skipper	Henry Chalkley	10-1	56.22	3
2nd	Bubbly Eagle	Paul Young	1-2f	56.34	2
3rd	Brimardon Helen	Tony Collett	16-1	56.42	4
4th	Vatican Iona	Pat Rosney	7-1	56.45	6
5th	Barnfield Broke	Paul Philpott	3-1	56.48	1
6th	Ardagh Charm	Denis Curtin	50-1	56.86	5

William Hill Cesarwitch, Oxford (Jun 30, 645m, £5,000)
Pos	Name of Greyhound	Trainer	SP	Time	Trap
1st	He Went Whoosh	Claude Gardiner	11-10f	39.56	5
2nd	Melodys Comet	Richard Yeates	7-2	39.59	2
3rd	Bada Who	Enid Gowler	7-2	39.71	1
4th	Heavy Weather	Paul Foster	20-1	39.90	3
5th	White Blaze	Paul Young	10-1	40.03	4
6th	Romeo Turbo	David Firmager	7-1	40.33	6

William Hill Grand Prix, Sunderland (Jul 16, 640m, £15,000)
Pos	Name of Greyhound	Trainer	SP	Time	Trap
1st	Crown Rover	Jimmy Wright	2-1	40.27	1
2nd	Lenson Joker	Tony Collett	1-1f	40.36	3
3rd	Wordsandatune	Paul Rutherford	10-1	40.51	2
4th	Bubby Totti	Ted Soppitt	4-1	40.54	6
5th	Lissycasey Punch	Barrie Draper	10-1	40.61	4
6th	Crockenhill	Kelly Macari	16-1	40.94	5

William Hill Classic, Sunderland (Jul 16, 450m, £40,000)
Pos	Name of Greyhound	Trainer	SP	Time	Trap
1st	Jogadusc Ace	Mark Wallis	5-1	27.83	3
2nd	Blood of Kings	Julie Bateson	5-2	28.13	1
3rd	Mario Gomez	Charlie Lister	8-1	28.18	6
4th	Compass Mikey	Paul Hennessy	8-1	28.34	2
5th	Droopys Bogart	Liz McNair	5-4f	28.39	5
6th	Ping the Lids	Andy Heyes	8-1	28.41	4

Totesport Gold Collar, Belle Vue (Aug 20, 590m, £10,000)
Pos	Name of Greyhound	Trainer	SP	Time	Trap
1st	Southwind Harry	Kim Billingham	6-1	35.21	5
2nd	Hurleys Hero	Jimmy Wright	9-4	35.46	4
3rd	Crown Rover	Jimmy Wright	5-4f	35.55	2
4th	Franks Lad	Paul Young	7-2	35.71	6
5th	Plough Lane	Julie Bateson	16-1	35.75	3
6th	East County	Jimmy Wright	3-1	35.81	1

Betfred Laurels, Belle Vue (Oct 6, 470m, £10,000)
Pos	Name of Greyhound	Trainer	SP	Time	Trap
1st	Sunoak Crystal	Julie Calvert	5-2	28.01	4
2nd	Target Brett	Julie Bateson	11-8f	28.27	6
3rd	Iconic Blue	John Davy	6-1	28.31	5
4th	Ping The Lids	Andy Heyes	7-2	28.53	3
5th	Farloe Titan	Paul Sallis	7-1	28.61	2
6th	Sniper Petra	Gary Carmichael	7-1	28.73	1

William Hill St Leger, Wimbledon (Oct 17, 668m, £13,000)
Pos	Name of Greyhound	Trainer	SP	Time	Trap
1st	Kinda Easy	Mark Wallis	2-1jf	40.57	6
2nd	Droopys Zach	Mark Wallis	2-1jf	40.58	3
3rd	Lorrys Options	Dean Childs	7-2	40.98	4
4th	Swift Messenger	Michael Harris	25-1	41.12	1
5th	Westmead Wings	Nick Savva	5-1	41.14	2
6th	Fraziers Clone	Bill Black	8-1	41.21	5

William Hill Oaks, Wimbledon (Dec 15, 460m, £6,000)
Pos	Name of Greyhound	Trainer	SP	Time	Trap
1st	Shaws Dilemma	Liz McNair	5-2	28.52	2
2nd	Freedom Emma	Richard Yeates	7-1	28.54	3
3rd	Tyrur Liz	P.J. Fahy	4-5f	28.69	6
4th	Little Jig	Chris Allsopp	10-1	28.92	1
5th	Cabra Exclusive	Liz McNair	20-1	28.96	5
6th	Slick Sioux	Keith Allsop	7-1	29.15	4

=== Principal Irish finals ===
BCR Print Easter Cup, Shelbourne (Apr 18, 550y, €40,000)
Pos	Name of Greyhound	Trainer	SP	Time	Trap
1st	Droopys Noel	Pat Buckley	6-1	29.91	3
2nd	Advantage Jimmy	Owen McKenna	11-4f	29.97	5
3rd	Oran Classic	John McGee Sr.	10-3	30.21	2
4th	Ballymac Under	Pa Fitzgerald	3-1	30.23	1
5th	Tip and Tin	Joe Carey	14-1	30.29	4
6th	Blackstone Gene	Owen McKenna	6-1	30.45	6

Red Mills Produce, Clonmel (May 3, 525y, €30,000)
Pos	Name of Greyhound	Trainer	SP	Time	Trap
1st	Duke Special	Michael Delahunty	2-1f	28.40	6
2nd	Carrowkeal Sam	Kathleen Murphy	14-1	28.75	5
3rd	Mumhan Aris	Denis Fitzgerald	10-1	28.78	2
4th	Cowboys Cheek	Morgan McMahon	7-2	28.89	4
5th	Shaneboy Lee	Denis Kiely	9-4	28.96	3
6th	Baby Daddy Cool	Tony O'Connor	4-1	28.97	1

Kerry Agribusiness Irish St Leger, Limerick (Jun 13, 550y, €35,000)
Pos	Name of Greyhound	Trainer	SP	Time	Trap
1st	Bar Blackstone	Sean Dunphy	2-1jf	29.62	2
2nd	Shaneboy Lee	Denis Kiely	2-1jf	29.79	5
3rd	Moveit Jamie	Michael Delahunty	6-1	29.80	1
4th	Chicken Supper	John Kiely	5-1	30.15	4
5th	Marked Urgent	Paul Hennessy	8-1	30.29	3
6th	Timor Blue	Jim Morrissey	3-1	dnf	6

Sporting Press Oaks, Shelbourne (Jun 27, 525y, €35,000)
Pos	Name of Greyhound	Trainer	SP	Time	Trap
1st	Skywalker Queen	Frances O'Donnell	9-4	28.24	6
2nd	Lady Glenard	Michael O'Donovan	7-2	28.60	3
3rd	Maireads Fantasy	Fraser Black	6-4f	28.88	5
4th	Another Issue	Michael O'Donovan	7-1	28.91	4
5th	Shades of Soul	M Gilbert	16-1	29.07	1
6th	Bling Bling Flo	John Meehan	50-1	29.08	2

Boylesports Champion Stakes, Shelbourne (Jul 25, 550y, €40,000)
Pos	Name of Greyhound	Trainer	SP	Time	Trap
1st	Fatboyz Nodrog	Pat Gordon	3-1jf	29.54	4
2nd	Shaneboy Lee	Denis Kiely	4-1	29.58	6
3rd	Faypoint Man	Owen McKenna	3-1jf	29.74	1
4th	Barefoot Bolt	Paul Hennessy	4-1	29.98	3
5th	Shelbourne Aston	Pat Curtin	6-1	30.14	5
6th	Barefoot Bryan	Paul Hennessy	8-1	30.18	2

HX Bookmakers Puppy Derby, Harolds Cross (Oct 9, 525y, €30,000)
Pos	Name of Greyhound	Trainer	SP	Time	Trap
1st	Tullymurry Act	Pat Buckley	7-4	28.57	3
2nd	Westmead Grant	Fraser Black	6-4f	28.58	6
3rd	Cornamaddy Swift	Darragh Robinson	10-1	28.82	2
4th	Bonville Johnny	Steve Locke	66-1	29.02	4
5th	Westmead Bond	Fraser Black	5-1	29.04	5
6th	Cornmaddy Flash	Darragh Robinson	6-1	29.06	1

Cashmans Laurels, Cork (Oct 17, 525y, €35,000)
Pos	Name of Greyhound	Trainer	SP	Time	Trap
1st	Sevenheads Bay	Graham Holland	4-1	28.50	1
2nd	Oran Classic	John McGee Sr.	7-4f	28.66	4
3rd	Boherna Best	Owen McKenna	5-2	28.78	6
4th	Tyrur Giovanni	Pat Buckley	6-1	29.06	3
5th	Bay City Jack	Larry Harding	16-1	29.86	5
6th	Forest Boss	Fraser Black	5-2	32.26	2
