= Sunderland Greyhound Stadium =

Stadium in Sunderland, England

Coordinates: 54.940191°N 1.409378°W

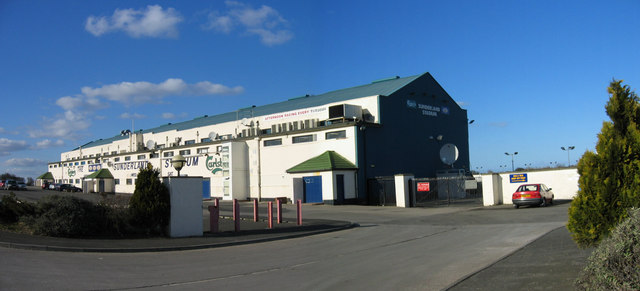
- The stadium entrance in 2006
- Interactive map of Sunderland Greyhound Stadium
- Location: City of Sunderland
- Owner: Arena Racing Company

Construction
- Opened: 1940
- Renovated: 1989
- Expanded: 1989

Tenant
- Greyhound racing

Website
- Official website

Sunderland Greyhound Stadium is a greyhound racing track situated at Fulwell in the City of Sunderland and English county of Tyne and Wear. The stadium is owned by ARC and racing takes place every Wednesday and Friday evening as well as an additional BAGS meeting on Tuesdays, Thursdays and Sundays. The circumference of the track is 378 metres.

== Speedway ==
Speedway races were held at the track from 1964 to 1974, with home teams including The Saints, The Stars and The Gladiators.

== Greyhound racing ==
=== Competitions ===
Sunderland host one major competition called the Arena Racing Company Grand Prix (formerly the William Hill Grand Prix). It is not to be confused with the defunct classic race, The Grand Prix, held at Walthamstow Stadium until its closure.

- Arena Racing Company Grand Prix
- Arena Racing Company Classic
- Northern Puppy Derby (now held at Newcastle)

=== History ===
==== Origins & Opening ====
Designed by architects Matkin and Hawkins, the stadium was built at a cost of £60,000 in 1940. The site chosen for the new Boldon Greyhound Stadium, as it was known at the time, was North of Sunderland and south-east of East Boldon where the Sunderland and Newcastle Roads merged. It ran parallel with this road on its south side and the London & North Eastern Railway on its north side. On the opposite side of the road (slightly east) was the East Boldon hospital for infectious diseases which would later become the sanatorium. Boldon had strong links to the mining community which was a common factor with new greyhound tracks.

It all started on the afternoon of Saturday 23 March 1940 at 3pm, quickly followed by a second and third meeting on the Easter Monday. Fred Gillespie was brought into the track to act as General and Racing Manager, along with other officials A E Hawkins from the Coundon track and George Hall from the White City Stadium (Newcastle). The opening meeting saw eight races over 450 yards and the meeting was advertised as a Sunderland super greyhound stadium with a wonder totalisator and three luxurious clubs, large covered enclosures and a free car park. The first ever winner was trap 2 'Percheron' at odds of 5–2 in a time of 28.35 secs.

==== Early history ====
The greyhound track at Sunderland has had a varying past with affiliation to the National Greyhound Racing Club (NGRC) on two separate occasions and a long stint as an independent track. It was known as the Newcastle Sports Stadium and the Boldon Greyhound Stadium throughout its history, before being renamed the Sunderland Greyhound Stadium.

Despite opening during the war, business grew year on year until peaking in 1946. The track included a large main glass fronted club on the home straight with ballroom attached, covered stand and clubs on the fourth bend, a covered stand on the back straight, with the racing kennels and paddock on the first bend. There was also accommodation for 170 greyhounds adjoining the stadium which acted as the resident kennels. It was a 380 yards circumference track with an 'Inside Sumner' hare and distances of 348, 450 & 600 yards.

The stadium first joined the NGRC set up after the war but withdrew in 1951 (believed to be on 26 February). The reason for the change was a system called 'Combine' which allowed tracks to run under rules similar to the latter day permit rules. Sunderland wanted owner-trainers that included many from the mining community to be able to race on separate race nights but the NGRC refused this request. With Sunderland also reliant on these forms of income the decision was made to leave.

The next forty years would see independent racing only, with racing held mainly every Thursday and Saturday evening; prize money was very good for a 'flapper' (term given to unlicensed tracks) offering a substantial £75 winners prize for some race in the mid-sixties which eclipsed many NGRC tracks. It was still an all-grass track, but there was now a 650-yard distance. Annual events included the Vaux Trophy and Milburn Trophy.

During the late seventies, the track turned to an all-sand surface and raced mainly handicaps over 420 metres but underwent changes as the Sunderland Greyhound Racing Co pulled out. The betting licence was renewed but the ageing stadium closed in June 1980, awaiting either an offer for the stadium or a lease agreement. John Young eventually stepped in to become the owner and acting as General Manager and Racing Manager and they also introduced whippet racing. Distances in the mid-eighties were 243, 420, 600, 777, and 957 metres.

==== Renovation & re-opening ====
At the end of 1988, businessmen and race horse owner Terry Robson and former Brough Park trainer Harry Williams took over the control of Sunderland. A new track was designed and over £1 million was spent rebuilding the facilities. There was a new restaurant, private boxes, and an application to the NGRC thrown in. A £20,000 sponsorship deal from the Mailcom business owned by Eddie Shotton was secured before the opening night to boost open race competitions; Shotton was a well-known greyhound owner. The all-sand track had an 'Outside McGee' and racing was overseen by former Middlesbrough Racing Manager Ross Searle on Wednesday, Friday and Saturday evenings. Ten contracted trainers were brought in, Michael Brunnock, Graham Calvert, Kevin Donnelly, George Elliott, Terry Hart, Shirley Linley, Eddie McDermott, Ken Thwaites, Malcolm Woods, and Dawn Milligan.

NGRC racing returned over forty years after the last affiliation with a bumper 12 race card on Wednesday 6 June 1990. The track was unrecognizable to the one that had existed just two years previous and ten days later open racing took place and attracted Ravage Again who was in the middle of his 29 consecutive winning streak.

==== Recent history ====
David Mullins and Ted Soppitt arrived as trainers in 1991 and the first ever Sunday greyhound racing fixture was held during 1992. Trainer Harry Williams won the Scottish Greyhound Derby with New Level in 1993.

The ownership has changed hands several times; first Lloyd Milligan ran the track and then Dodds and Stephenson came into part ownership with Williams before Kevin Wilde became the latest owner in 1994. Wilde had been involved in the takeover of Brough Park, where Williams now returned to take up training again. Jimmy Nunn arrived as the new Racing Manager from Sheffield.

Sunderland gained a lucrative BAGS contract before William Hill made it clear they were looking to invest into the greyhound industry influenced by the 'New Deal'. Following negotiations with Wilde, they agreed the purchase Sunderland for £9.4 million in September 2002. Wilde remained as the Director of greyhound stadia following the William Hill purchase of Brough Park one year later. The track was voted "Northern Greyhound Track of the Year" by the British Greyhound Racing Board in 2005.

Following the departure of Kevin Wilde, William Hill appointed Joe O'Donnell as Director of Stadia. In May 2017 the Arena Racing Company (ARC) acquired both Sunderland Greyhound Stadium and Newcastle Greyhound Stadium from William Hill.

The annual UK William Hill festival of racing was the principal event at the track, the meeting included the William Hill Grand Prix and William Hill Classic and was shown live on Sky Sports. In 2018 the stadium signed a deal with their parent company ARC to race every Tuesday afternoon, Wednesday evening, Thursday lunchtime and Sunday lunchtime.

In 2021, the William Hill Grand Prix returned but was renamed to the Arena Racing Company Grand Prix and it was downgraded to a Category 2 event. In 2022, the stadium owners ARC signed a long-term deal with Entain for media rights, starting in January 2024.

=== Track records ===
==== Current track records ====
| Metres | Greyhound | Time (sec) | Date | Notes/ref |
|---|---|---|---|---|
| 261 | Walshes Hill | 15.30 | 20 June 2015 | |
| 450 | Witton Venus | 26.41 | 14 April 2023 | |
| 640 | New Destiny | 38.79 | 18 April 2025 | ARC Grand Prix final |
| 828 | Shes the Deal | 51.81 | 24 January 2006 | |

==== Former track records ====
Extended content

| Metres | Greyhound | Time (sec) | Date | Notes/ref |
|---|---|---|---|---|
| 255 | Ravage Again | 15.87 | 16 June 1990 | |
| 255 | Steamy Lass | 15.85 | 11 July 1990 | |
| 255 | Ravage Again | 15.65 | 20 July 1990 | |
| 255 | Intelligent Lad | 15.64 | 12 September 1990 | |
| 261 | Gold Buster | 15.60 | 10 February 1996 | |
| 261 | Ballymac Rooster | 15.54 | 10 October 2006 | |
| 261 | Hes A Mystery | 15.50 | 22 May 2009 | |
| 261 | Jimmy Lollie | 15.38 | 9 July 2010 | |
| 405 | Harens Smokey | 25.21 | 14 September 1990 | |
| 405 | Disc | 25.05 | 21 September 1990 | |
| 405 | Sunshine Slippy | 24.97 | 3 December 1990 | |
| 450 | Mandies Supreme | 27.55 | 16 June 1990 | |
| 450 | Mandies Supreme | 27.52 | 27 June 1990 | |
| 450 | Pinewood Rocky | 27.47 | 22 August 1990 | |
| 450 | Slaneyside Hare | 27.41 | 10 October 1990 | |
| 450 | Seafield Quest | 27.38 | 10 November 1990 | Mailcom Puppy Derby Final |
| 450 | Gulleen Darkie | 27.29 | 19 December 1990 | |
| 450 | Harsu Super | 27.00 | 25 October 2000 | |
| 450 | Premier Marine | 26.93 | 23 October 2004 | |
| 450 | Roxholme Silks | 26.65 | 8 December 2004 | Northern Puppy Derby semi |
| 450 | Delwood Senior | 26.80 | 11 August 2006 | |
| 450 | Mahers Boy | 26.75 | 19 May 2007 | Classic semi-final |
| 450 | Groovy Stan | 26.67 | 19 May 2007 | Classic semi-final |
| 450 | Meenala Cruiser | 26.64 | 22 May 2007 | |
| 450 | Blonde Snapper | 26.59 | 14 July 2011 | Classic final |
| 450 | Droopys Trapper | 26.49 | 22 July 2018 | |
| 580 | Tomijo | 36.00 | 16 June 1990 | |
| 631 | Sir Alva | 39.59 | 16 June 1990 | |
| 640 | Autumn Tiger | 38.97 | 22 October 1995 | |
| 640 | Blue Tick George | 38.95 | 13 April 2021 | ARC Grand Prix semi final |
| 640 | Coolavanny Aunty | 38.81 | 14 April 2022 | ARC Grand Prix semi final |
| 776 | Glasha Band | 50.66 | 27 July 1990 | |
| 776 | Chitral | 49.91 | 25 August 1990 | |
| 782 | Always Dangerous | 50.13 | 14 September 1990 | |
| 826 | Road Princess | 52.99 | 16 June 1990 | |
| 828 | Elteen Heather | 53.06 | 1997 | |
| 828 | Doras Miller | 52.46 | 13 February 2002 | |
| 828 | Blues Fancy | 52.18 | 14 December 2004 | |
| 828 | Shes the Deal | 51.98 | 20 December 2005 | |
