= Harlow Stadium =

Greyhound racing track in Essex, England

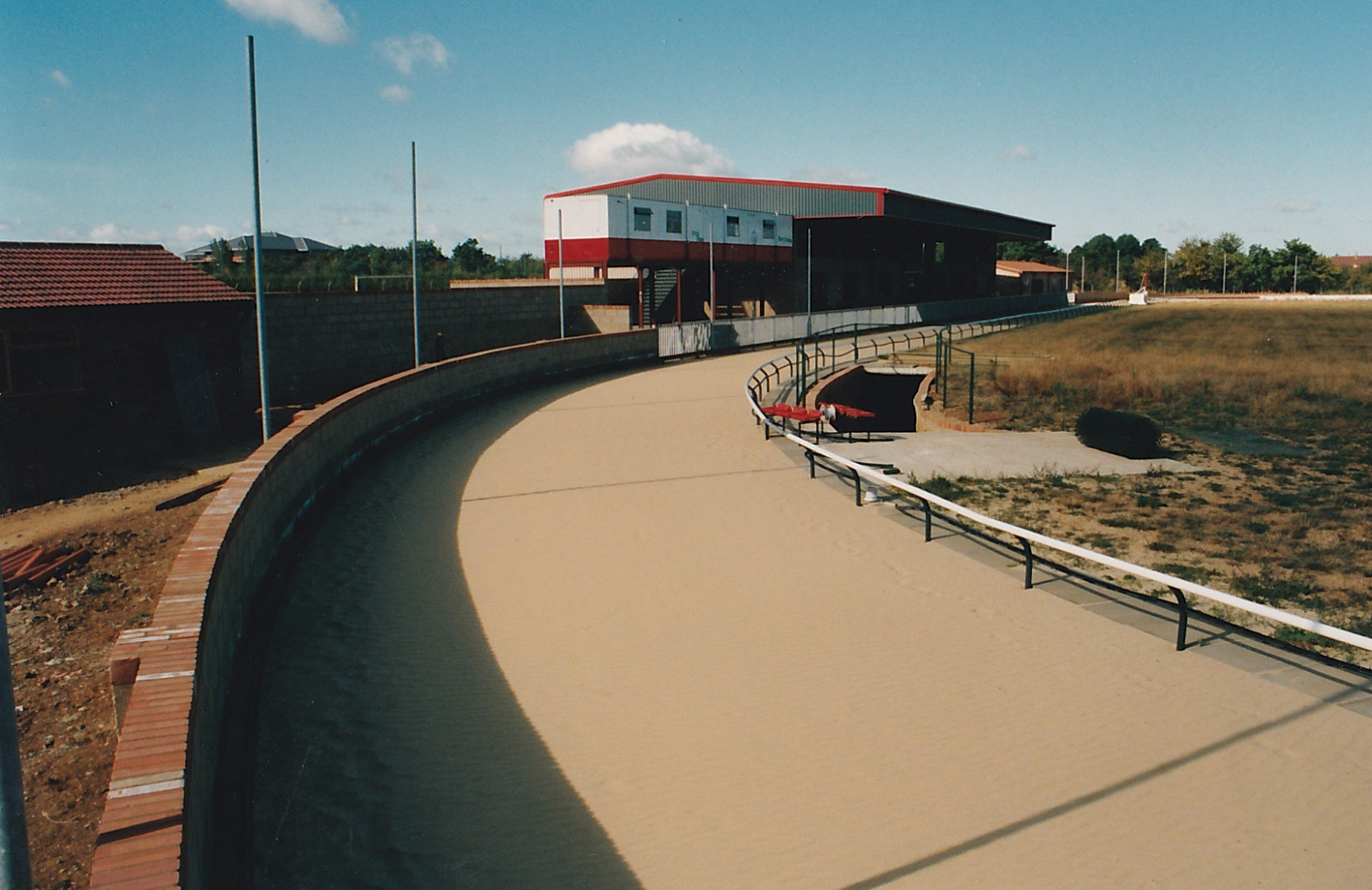
- Harlow Stadium circa.1995
- Interactive map of Harlow Stadium
- Location: Roydon Road, The Pinnacles, Harlow, CM19 5FT
- Coordinates: 51.7722°N 0.0637°E

Construction
- Opened: 1995

Tenant
- Greyhound racing

Website
- Official website

Harlow Stadium is a greyhound racing track located in Harlow, Essex, England. The stadium also has executive suites, a restaurant, a number of bars and conference and banqueting facilities.

Racing takes place in the evening on Monday and Wednesday, and in the morning on Friday, Saturday and Sunday.

== Opening ==
Harlow Stadium opened on Wednesday 15 March 1995. The site chosen for racing was an area north east of the town known as the Pinnacles just off the Roydon Road and directly west of the football stadium. Access to the track is on Stadium Way past the Scimitar industrial park. Toni Nicholls bought the land from receivers when the new football stadium was being built in 1993 and constructed the new facilities including executive suites, a restaurant and conference and banqueting facilities. In addition a large car park was constructed. The first ever trial session, in preparation for the opening was held in October 1994.

== History ==
The first Racing Manager was former trainer Stan Gudgin who was replaced by Mark Schellenberg after Gudgins retirement. In 2005 Nicholls's company Leaside Leisure Ltd came to an agreement with Barclay Entertainment to sell the track. The new stadium owner was Dave Barclay joint-owner of a successful building contractors business in the Essex area. Despite offers from developers Barclay continues to invest into the track and has achieved some notable successes for Harlow Greyhound Stadium.

Following the closure of Walthamstow Stadium in 2008 Chris Page arrived as General Manager with five trainers; John Coleman, Mark Wallis, Mick Puzey, Graham Sharp and Kelly Mullins. Mark Wallis brought the ultimate prize to the track after winning the 2009 English Greyhound Derby with Kinda Ready. Harlow was rewarded with a first Sky Sports televised meeting in 2011 and Barclay brought in Greyhound Sales in 2013.

In 2018 the stadium signed a deal with SIS to race every Monday and Wednesday evening and every Friday and Sunday morning.

== Track records ==
=== Current records ===
Metres	Greyhound	Time	Date	Notes
238	Kenton Ten	14.52	29 January 2020	
415	Barton Wade	25.50	9 October 2002	
592	Loggies Rosie	36.85	10 January 2018	
769	Snappy Girl	49.43	31 May 2006	
946	Killishin Masai	62.11	23 May 2010	
415 hurdles	Barnfield Haveit	26.03	8 August 2010	
592 hurdles	Bozy Blue Blaze	38.30	22 August 2001	

=== Former ===
Extended content

Metres	Greyhound	Time	Date	Notes
238	Nellie Thursby	14.73	18 September 2002	
238	Morning Glory	14.66	12 July 2014	
238	Jumeirah Maximus	14.59	4 April 2017	
238	Chopchop Hope	14.58	19 September 2018	
415 hurdles	Bossy Pallashell	26.20	10 July 2002	
415 hurdles	Inkspot	26.20	16 October 2002	
415 hurdles	Bomber Bailey	26.14	1 July 2009	
415 hurdles	Bomber Bailey	26.11	17 March 2010	
592	Decoy Cheetah	37.13	16 June 1995	
592	Treasured Manx	37.13	1997	
592	Blackrose Mars	37.11	20 June 2007	
592	Daphs Girl	37.11	25 July 2009	
592	Borna Payment	37.01	31 March 2010	
592 hurdles	Bozy Blue Blaze	38.53	15 August 2001	
769	Micks Best Magic	49.59	9 January 2002	
769	Slaheny Lass	49.58	17 September 2003	
769	Kingsmill Champ	49.54	17 August 2005	
769	Tipsy Rose	49.47	28 December 2005	
946	Souda Bay	63.14	13 April 1998	
946	Countrywidecapel	62.98	8 February 2006	
