= Central Park Stadium =

British greyhound racing venue

Coordinates: 51.34827°N 0.75930°E

Central Park
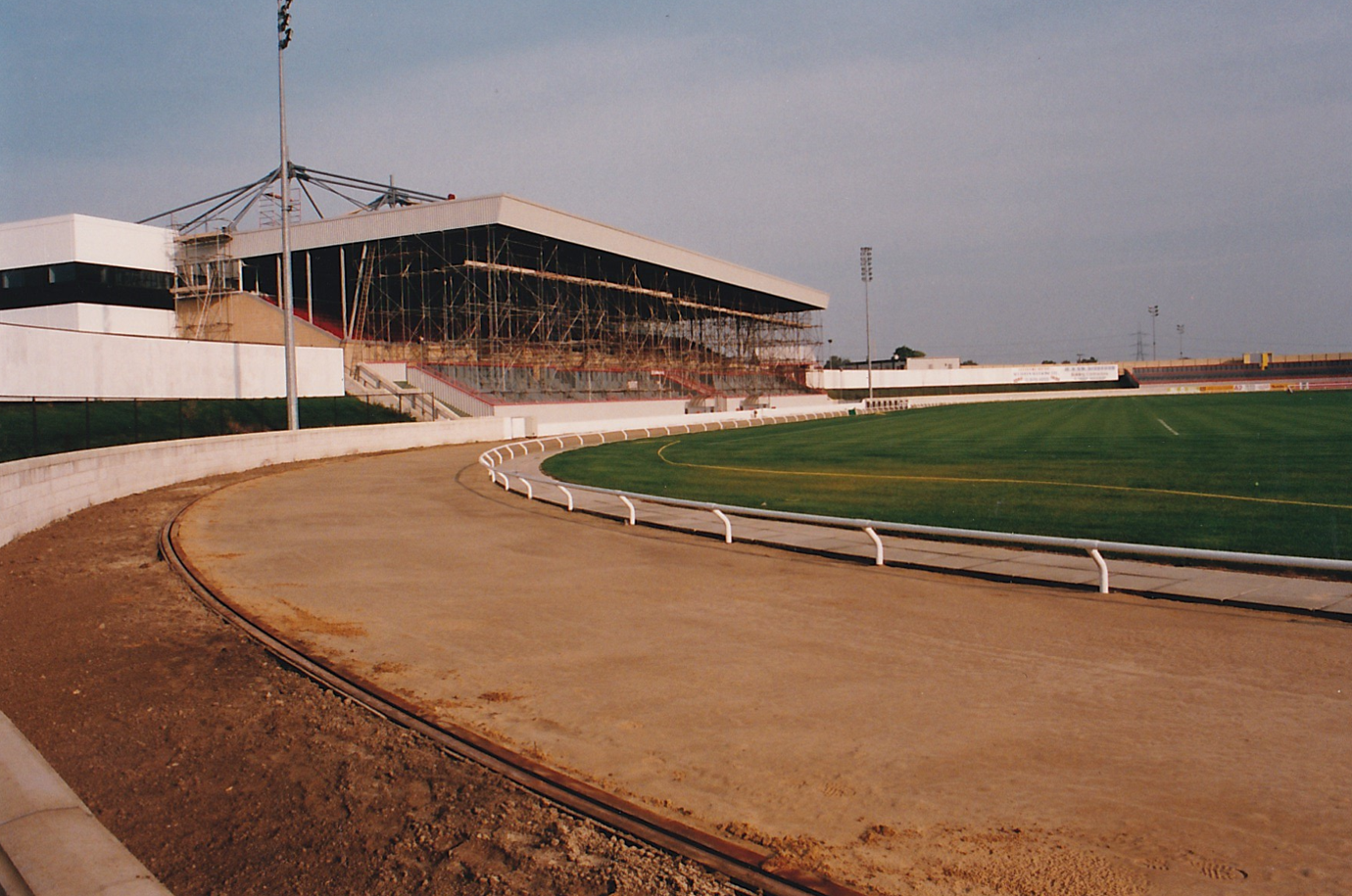
- The stadium during construction
- Interactive map of Central Park
- Full name: Central Park Stadium
- Location: Sittingbourne, Kent
- Operator: Arena Racing Company
- Capacity: 6000 (2000 seats)
- Surface: Grass with greyhound track

Construction
- Built: 1990
- Opened: 1990

Tenant
- Greyhound racing

Website
- Official website

Central Park Stadium, formerly Sittingbourne Stadium, is a greyhound racing track, and former speedway track and football stadium located in Murston, Sittingbourne, Kent, England. Greyhound racing takes place Monday/Thursday Afternoons, Friday mornings and Tuesday/Saturday evenings. Meetings are broadcast onSIS.

== Facilities ==
The stadium was built to a capacity of approximately 6,000, with 2,000 seats available in the Main Stand, two end terraces and a large covered terrace opposite the Main Stand. There are also four private suites, a trackside restaurant, three bars and a fast food cafeteria.

== History ==
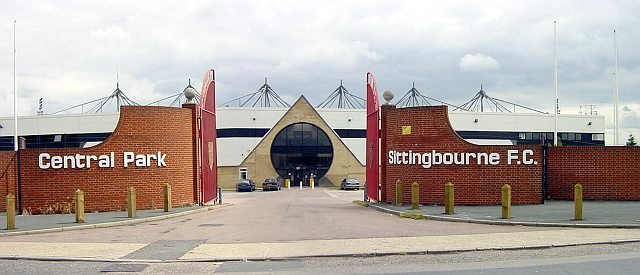
The entrance to the stadium in 2005

Sittingbourne FC played at the Bull Ground in the town centre until 1990, when they sold the site for £4.5 million and built a new state of the art stadium on the outskirts of the town named Central Park Stadium. However, overspending on the new ground caused the club financial difficulties and they were forced to sell the ground to the local council and lease it back. The ground was eventually leased to a company that ran greyhound racing events, who allowed the football club to sign a seven-year lease (a requirement of the Southern League). The club found it hard to guarantee the availability of the stadium due to the racing, however, and agreed to start playing their games on part of the complex where they used to train. This was built in 2002 and named Bourne Park.

== Speedway ==
In May 2013, National League speedway returned to the county of Kent, with the newly formed Kent Kings racing at the stadium.

== Greyhound racing ==
=== Competitions ===
- Cesarewitch
- Kent Derby
- Kent Plate
- Kent Silver Salver
- WJ & JE Cearns Invitation (discontinued)
- Springbok (discontinued)
- Grand National (discontinued)
- Juvenile (previously held at the track)

=== Opening ===
The track was supposed to have opened during 1994 but following several trial sessions was put on hold due to problems surrounding the football club. These included debts of £1.1 million and a £680,000 repair to a structural design fault with the roof of the stadium.

Sittingbourne opened on Tuesday 3 October 1995, with a crowd 2,125; the new facilities included a track side restaurant, fast food outlets, three licensed bars and three private executive suites. The first ever race over 475 metres was won by Try My House for trainer Wayne Wilson. Wilson would also claim the first major win for the track when he won the 1995 Puppy Derby at Wimbledon Stadium with Corpo Election. The other trainers supplying runners on the opening night were Sonia Spiers, Derek Millen, Alison Ingram, Peter Galloway, Martin White, Ken Tester, Mick Mew & Tony Palmer. The general manager was John Aitken and the racing manager was Paul Nevett.

=== History ===
Financial troubles surfaced again in 1996 and the track was forced to close and with no promoter available to run the stadium the future of the new venue was put into question. However, during 1996, Roger Cearns re-opened the stadium; Cearns was the grandson of W.J. 'Bill' Cearns the founder of Wimbledon Stadium way back in 1928. Cearns transformed the operation into a successful business and in the process negotiated a deal that brought the Trainers Championship to the track in 1998.

Cearns then introduced the Kent Derby as the track's principal event and managed to secure a second Trainers Championship in 2000. Cheryl Miller and Maxine Locke joined the training ranks soon after and Jess Packer was brought in as racing manager. Miller reached the 2002 English Greyhound Derby final with Windgap Java, a first for Sittingbourne; the fawn dog had won the Pall Mall Stakes earlier in the year. Another major event was introduced at the track, the Kent Silver Salver, revived after being shelved following the closure of Canterbury. In 2003, Sittingbourne staged a third Trainers Championship within a six-year period, and the track took over the running of the WJ Cearns Memorial) from Wimbledon. In 2006, the track agreed a deal with Betfair to stage 10 Sunday meetings that were screened on Eurosport.

Lenson Joker won the 2008 Greyhound of the Year and John Mullins won the 2011 TV Trophy on his home track with Knockies Hannah, the first time the event had been held at Sittingbourne. In 2012, the track was granted permission to host the original classic race for hurdlers the Grand National which moved from Wimbledon. It was a major coup for the track.

In 2017, following the closure of Wimbledon Stadium, the track received two more high-profile competitions called the Springbok and Juvenile. The Springbok was inaugurated in 1937 and is the leading competition for novice hurdlers. The Juvenile was inaugurated in 1957 and is an invitation competition for the best six greyhounds who still have a puppy status.

In 2018, the stadium signed a deal with SIS to race every Monday, Tuesday, Wednesday and Thursday morning and every Friday evening. Following the closure of Towcester in 2018, trainer Patrick Janssens joined the track and later won the 2020 Trainer of the Year title.

In April 2021, promoter Roger Cearns announced that the stadium had been sold to the Arena Racing Company. In 2022, the stadium owners ARC signed a long-term deal with Entain for media rights, starting in January 2024. In June 2023, the stadium underwent major track renovation costing £500,000, which resulted in new race distances. As a consequence the track stopped racing over hurdles.

=== Track records ===
==== Current ====
Metres	Greyhound	Time (sec)	Date	Notes/ref
277	Romeo Steel	15.89	28 February 2026	
491	Scooby The Lady	28.40	28 March 2026	Arena Racing Kent Plate Final
664	Bluejig Outlaw	39.46	25 April 2026	
731	Mongys Wild	43.64	24 January 2026	Cesarewitch Final
946	Droopys Samara	57.25	27 June 2026	

==== Previous ====
Extended content

Metres	Greyhound	Time (sec)	Date	Notes
265	Fast Ranger	16.20	24 November 1999	
265	Westmead Shaw	16.13	20 May 2012	
265	Murlens Crash	16.00	16 March 2014	
265	Troy Bella	15.99	24 March 2019	Silver Salver semi-final
277	Kevinsfort Duke	16.05	26 November 2024	
277	Rioja Oisin	16.01	28 June 2025	Silver Salver final
277	King Presley	15.99	6 September 2025	
450	Parking Flash	27.46	4 June 2006	
450	Jims Havana	27.35	17 June 2007	
450	Citizen Skipper	27.26	24 May 2009	
450	Jacks Back	27.10	8 July 2010	
450	Farley Champ	27.00	25 March 2015	
450	Lenson Jed	26.93	26 January 2016	
450	My Mate Max	26.92	4 October 2016	
473	Rebel Leader	28.73		
473	Droopys Vieri	28.53	26 March 2000	Trainers championship meeting
480	Reagrove Roe	29.09	4 June 2006	
480	Lenson Joker	28.92	12 August 2007	Kent Derby heats
480	Lenson Bolt	28.91	16 August 2009	Kent Derby heats
480	Eye On the Flash	28.90	4 March 2010	
480	Blonde Fletch	28.80	20 June 2010	
480	Jazz Apollo	28.72	24 July 2011	
480	Coolavanny Bert	28.50	20 November 2011	
500	Official Rebel	30.70	28 May 2006	
500	Emporio Spitfire	30.60	4 June 2006	
500	Macintosh Wonder	30.53	16 July 2006	
500	Lenson Express	30.31	8 April 2007	WJ & JE Cearns Invitation
500	Lenson Earl	30.26	9 December 2007	
500	Lenson Express	30.23	28 September 2008	
500	Grayslands Tiger	30.14	24 May 2009	
500	Lemon Maldini	29.97	24 July 2011	
500	Toolatetosell	29.75	10 August 2014	
500	Jet Stream Duke	29.84	16 March 2014	
500	King Eden	29.46	3 October 2017	
642	Gormanstown Star	40.60		
642	Domingo Dancer	40.33	17 April 1998	Trainers Championship meeting
642	Lobo	39.96	7 October 1999	
642	Droopys Zach	39.64	9 August 2009	
642	Boomtown Polly	39.60	30 March 2014	
642	Droopys Posh	39.58	11 May 2014	
642	Touch Tackle	39.44	19 October 2014	
642	Affleck Bolt	39.33	24 March 2019	
664	Garfiney Blaze	40.12	8 March 2025	
664	Proper Dangeress	40.10	2 August 2025	
664	Burrows Charm	40.03	31 January 2026	
708	Sumi Girl	44.32	27 November 1998	
708	Brimardon Star	44.00	3 May 2009	
708	Brimardon Star	43.70	2 August 2009	
731	Garfiney Blaze	44.05	20 January 2024	Cesarewitch final
731	Droopys Flare	43.87	4 January 2025	Cesarewitch heat
893	Redec Pride	59.62	22 October 2006	
893	Slaneyside Demon	58.42	29 October 2006	
893	Slaneyside Demon	57.64	5 November 2006	
893	Omega Wink	57.44	29 July 2007	
893	Gas Hawk	57.20	2 August 2009	
893	Seamies Gambler	57.19	9 August 2009	
893	Matching Amy	56.91	20 June 2010	
893	Droopys Djokovic	56.82	31 July 2011	
893	Buglys Billie	56.82	21 August 2011	
893	Aayamzabella	56.49	17 October 2013	
893	Slick Strauss	56.24	3 October 2017	
916	Jodie With Flex	58.29	14 February 1999	
916	Ericas Equity	58.09	17 August 2003	
943	Baliff Perry	62.14	15 October 2006	
943	Omega Wink	61.96	26 December 2006	
943	Gaytime Beauty	60.74	12 August 2007	
943	Omega Wink	60.69	15 August 2007	
943	Blonde Blitz	60.18	18 July 2010	
265 H	Mystical Mick	16.66	16 March 2014	
265 H	Barricane Jack	16.61	15 February 2019	
265 H	Bockos Tiger	16.54	13 September 2019	
473 H	Ballmac Keano	29.41	1 July 2001	
480 H	Borodale Hawk	31.02	26 November 2006	
480 H	Skippers Crew	30.58	3 December 2006	
480 H	Nickel Trader	30.53	9 March 2007	
480 H	Nickel Trader	30.40	18 March 2007	
480 H	Carnaree Honcho	30.06	7 April 2007	
480 H	Westmead Vieri	29.90	19 May 2007	
480 H	Castledale Lad	29.71	19 August 2007	
480 H	Platinumlancelot	29.45	30 July 2009	
480 H	Sizzlers Spirit	29.44	15 July 2010	
480 H	Mash Mad Snowy	29.20	1 June 2014	
480 H	Razldazl Raidio	29.18	11 September 2016	
480 H	Ballymac Manix	29.17	18 September 2016	
480 H	Razldazl Raidio	28.99	25 September 2016	
480 H	Sober Call	28.97	22 February 2017	
