= Olympic (greyhounds) =

English greyhound racing competition

The Olympic
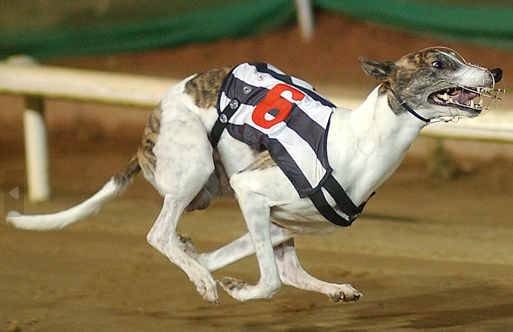
- The 2001 champion Solid Magic
- Class: Category 1
- Location: Brighton & Hove Greyhound Stadium
- Inaugurated: 1947
- Sponsor: Coral

Race information
- Distance: 515 metres
- Surface: Sand
- Purse: £10,000 (winner)

The Olympic is a greyhound racing competition held annually at Brighton & Hove Greyhound Stadium.

It was inaugurated in 1947 at Wandsworth Stadium. Following the closure of Wandsworth in June 1966 the competition switched to Charlton Stadium which itself closed in September 1971. After an eight year gap the event was resurrected by Hove in 1979 and has remained there since.

== Venues and distances ==
- 1947–1960 (Wandsworth, 600 yards)
- 1961–1965 (Wandsworth, 650 yards)
- 1966–1971 (Charlton, 600 yards)
- 1979–present (Hove, 515 metres)

== Sponsors ==
- 1989–1991 (Phoenix Brewery)
- 1994–2006 (Courage Brewery)
- 2007–2007 (Stadium Bookmakers)
- 2008–2008 (Emily Wood Memorial)
- 2009–present (Coral)

== Past winners ==
| Year | Winner | Breeding | Trainer | Time (sec) | SP | Notes/ref |
|---|---|---|---|---|---|---|
| 1947 | Dante II | Well Squared – Olives Idol | Bob Burls (Wembley) | 34.67 | 2/5f | Track record |
| 1948 | Captain Lake | Captain Brown – Banna Lake | Jack Harvey (Wembley) | 35.09 | 10/1 | |
| 1949 | Mutton Star | Mad Tanist – Lowerstown Countess | Jack Harvey (Wembley) | 35.33 | 3/1 | |
| 1950 | Captain The Killer | Tanist – Fly Dancer | Norman Merchant (Private) | 35.47 | 5/4f | |
| 1951 | Polar Star | Rebel Express – Please Lady | Noreen Collin (Walthamstow) | 36.63 | 11/4 | |
| 1952 | Ballinasloe Lassie | Rimmells Black – Girlie O'Connor | Jack Harvey (Wembley) | 35.35 | 3/1 | |
| 1953 | Lizette | Master Captain – Dorothy Ann | Paddy Fortune (Wimbledon) | 35.24 | 2/5f | |
| 1954 | Rushton Spot | Rushton News – Rushton Panda | Frank Johnson (Private) | 35.96 | 15/8 | |
| 1955 | Whats Yat | Magourna Reject – Coolflash | Leslie Reynolds (Wembley) | 36.08 | 3/1 | |
| 1956 | Even Gait | Ballylanigan Tanist – Narrogar Ann | G Holyhead (Wandsworth) | 35.57 | 7/4jf | |
| 1957 | Land Of Song | Fire Prince – Old Blarney Gift | Bob Burls (Wembley) | 35.05 | 2/5f | |
| 1958 | Kilcaskin Karmen | Kilcaskin Mail – Greenane Princess | Johnny Bullock (West Ham) | 35.91 | 4/5f | |
| 1959 | Tams Torness | Prince Chancer – Tams Trasna | Jimmy Jowett (Clapton) | 35.33 | 11/2 | |
| 1960 | Crazy Paving | Magourna Reject – Minorcas Judy | Charles Payne (Private) | 36.35 | 6/4f | |
| 1961 | Clonalvy Pride | Solar Prince – Asmena | Jack Harvey (Wembley) | 38.46 | | |
| 1962 | Powerstown Prospect | Hi There – Faoide | Ronnie Melville (Wembley) | 38.35 | | |
| 1963 | Music Guest | Solar Prince – The Grand Duchess | Tom Johnston Sr. (West Ham) | 38.53 | | |
| 1964 | Carols Champion | Tanyard Champion – Carols Pride | Johnny Bullock (West Ham) | 38.15 | 7/4 | |
| 1965 | Vals Parachute | Crazy Parachute – Vals Orphan | Maurice Mason (Private) | 37.99 | | |
| 1966 | Cons Duke | Crazy Parachute – Cons Diet | Lionel Maxen (Hackney) | 34.79 | | |
| 1967 | Roamin Beauty | Knockrour Again – Goleen | Paddy Keane (Clapton) | 34.73 | | |
| 1968 | Fire Trap | Clonmannon Fire – Spring Trap | Paddy McEvoy (Wimbledon) | 34.68 | | |
| 1969 | Premier Power | Powerstown Proper – Mink Guest | Paddy McEllistrim (Wimbledon) | 34.57 | 100/7 | |
| 1970 | Al's Tiger | Hi Joe – Kilcumney Miss | Tom Smith (Catford) | 34.44 | 4/1 | |
| 1971 | Supreme Fun | Newdown Heather – Top Note | Sid Ryall (Private) | | | |
| 1979 | Greenane Metro | Greenane Decca – Pineapple Grand | Arthur Hitch (Private) | 30.86 | | |
| 1980 | Young Breeze | Sage – Scorduff Breeze | Jack Coker (Oxford) | 29.03 | 11/4 | |
| 1981 | Corrakelly Air | Supreme Fun – Quarry Streaker | Chris Coyle (Private) | 30.86 | 5/1 | dead-heat |
| 1981 | Greenane Metro | Greenane Decca – Pineapple Grand | Arthur Hitch (Private) | 30.86 | 13/8f | dead-heat |
| 1982 | Glen Miner | Glen Rock – Daring Lil | Peter Rich (Ramsgate) | 29.62 | 15/8 | Track record |
| 1983 | Huberts Shade | Luminous Lad – Huberts Fate | Adam Jackson (Wembley) | 30.33 | 8/1 | |
| 1984 | Westmead Milos | All Wit – Westmead Satin | Nick Savva (Milton Keynes) | 30.20 | 15/8jf | |
| 1985 | Ballyregan Bob | Ballyheigue Moon – Evening Daisy | George Curtis (Hove) | 30.04 | 2/5f | |
| 1986 | House Hunter | Tiger Jazz – Brass Tacks | Gunner Smith (Hove) | 30.06 | 3/1 | |
| 1987 | House Hunter | Tiger Jazz – Brass Tacks | Gunner Smith (Hove) | 30.14 | 3/1 | |
| 1988 | John Doe | Easy And Slow – Time Consuming | Bill Masters (Hove) | 30.14 | 4/1 | |
| 1989 | White Island | Curryhills Fox – Cassio Lil | Bill Masters (Hove) | 30.30 | 8/1 | |
| 1990 | Labana Mathew | Mathews World – Labana Queen | Geoff De Mulder (Norton Canes) | 30.04 | 2/5f | |
| 1991 | Shanavulin Bingo | Michigan Man – Shanavulin Flash | Ernie Gaskin Sr. (Private) | 30.40 | 7/4 | |
| 1992 | Satharn Lady | Satharn Beo – Long Valley Lady | John Coleman (Walthamstow) | 30.08 | 3/1 | |
| 1993 | Hypnotic Stag | Greenpark Fox – Sister Moonshine | John Coleman (Walthamstow) | 29.74 | 4/7f | |
| 1994 | Westmead Chick | I'm Slippy – Westmead Move | Nick Savva (Hackney) | 30.55 | 6/4f | |
| 1995 | Sir Frederick | Satharn Beo – Liberal Girl | Derek Knight (Hove) | 29.99 | 5/4f | |
| 1996 | Hart To Mine | Greenpark Fox – Slippy Hart | Brian Clemenson (Hove) | 30.05 | 1/1f | |
| 1997 | Astrosyn Eureka | Murlens Slippy – Oakfront Magic | Derek Knight (Hove) | 30.05 | 7/4f | |
| 1998 | Xamax Na Cap | Adraville Bridge – That's Becky | Ernie Gaskin Sr. (Walthamstow) | 30.71 | 8/1 | |
| 1999 | Principal Meteor | Frightful Flash – Sidhes Magic | Derek Knight (Hove) | 30.13 | 11/4 | |
| 2000 | Smoking Wardy | Green Grass – Meelin Cutie | Derek Knight (Hove) | 29.90 | 5/4f | |
| 2001 | Solid Magic | Iceni Regent – Clodeen Magic | Brian Clemenson (Hove) | 29.93 | 6/4f | |
| 2002 | Cuba | Toms The Best – Lydpal Mary | Brian Clemenson (Hove) | 29.83 | 8/1 | |
| 2003 | Droopys Oasis | Larkhill Jo – Droopys Graf | Brian Clemenson (Hove) | 29.86 | 5/1 | |
| 2004 | Orient Ron | Judicial Pride – Oriel Girl | Brian Clemenson (Hove) | 29.68 | 11/8f | |
| 2005 | Droopys Oasis | Larkhill Jo – Droopoys Graf | Brian Clemenson (Hove) | 29.92 | 9/2 | |
| 2006 | Son of Phoebe | Droopys Vieri – Killeacle Phoebe | Brian Clemenson (Hove) | 29.85 | 2/1jf | |
| 2007 | Jazz Hurricane | Top Honcho – Lucy May | Derek Knight (Hove) | 29.84 | 7/4f | |
| 2008 | Shelbourne Rich | Never Give Up – Expert View | Brian Clemenson (Hove) | 29.86 | 9/2 | |
| 2009 | Ballymac Ruso | Ballymac Maeve – Ballymac Lark | Matt Dartnall (Private) | 29.48 | 6/4f | |
| 2010 | Ballymac William | Magical Captain – Ballymac Floss | Carly Philpott (Private) | 29.92 | 1/1f | |
| 2011 | Diesel Malc | Ballymac Maeve – Crazy Jane | Michael Fawsitt (Private) | 29.56 | 3/1 | |
| 2012 | Ballymac Eske | Burnpark Champ – Ballymac Penske | Barrie Draper (Sheffield) | 29.40 | 2/7f | |
| 2013 | Jaytee Lightning | Duke Special – Westmead Joy | Paul Young (Romford) | 29.62 | 7/4 | |
| 2014 | Thatchers Champ | Hondo Black – Kilmessan Beauty | Paul Young (Romford) | 30.21 | 5/1 | |
| 2015 | Holdem Chico | Kinloch Brae – Cornamaddy Tiny | Carol Weatherall (Private) | 30.10 | 10/1 | |
| 2016 | Droopys Buick | Yeah Man – Droopys Hilda | Jimmy Wright (Newcastle) | 29.89 | 2/5f | |
| 2017 | Bruisers Bullet | Droopys Cain – Clover Bride | Mark Wallis (Towcester) | 29.90 | 6/4f | |
| 2018 | King Turbo | Leamaneigh Turbo – Wee Tiger Tot | Liz McNair (Private) | 29.90 | 6/4f | |
| 2019 | King Sheeran | Eden The Kid – Skate On | Liz McNair (Private) | 29.93 | 2/1jf | |
| 2020 | Newinn Jacko | Laughil Duke – Coolavanny Pearl | Ernest Gaskin Jr. (Private) | 31.43 | 7/2 | |
| 2021 | Prince of Troy | Droopys Sydney – Chatam Lady | David Mullins (Romford) | 30.21 | 25/1 | |
| 2022 | Fromposttopillar | Droopys Sydney – Rafa Babys Baby | Liz McNair (Private) | 29.78 | 5/4f | |
| 2023 | King Memphis | Droopys Sydney – Queen Beyonce | Liz McNair (Private) | 29.87 | 10/11f | |
| 2024 | Proper Heiress | Droopys Sydney – Powerful Mush | Mark Wallis (Private) | 29.49 | 11/10f | |
| 2025 | Proper Heiress | Droopys Sydney – Powerful Mush | Mark Wallis (Private) | 29.39 | 2/7f | |

== Winning trainers ==
- Brian Clemenson 8
- Derek Knight 5
- Jack Harvey 4
- Liz McNair 4
