= 1953 UK & Ireland Greyhound Racing Year =

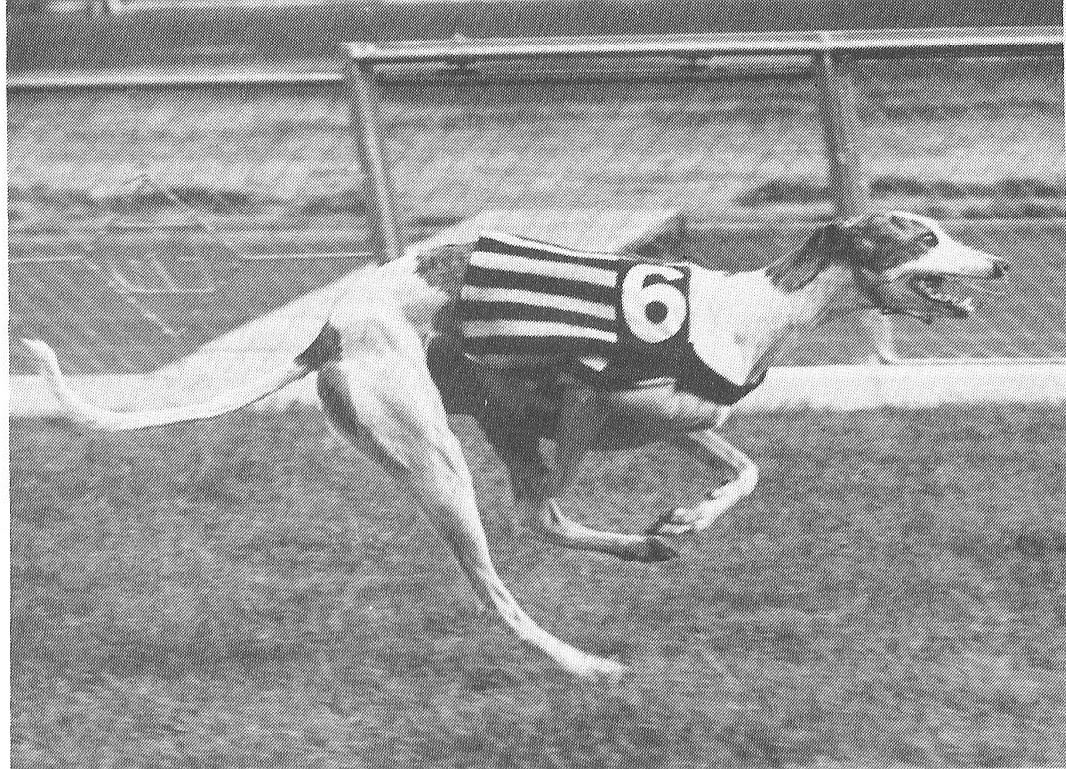
- Oaks winner Lizette

The 1953 UK & Ireland Greyhound Racing Year was the 28th year of greyhound racing in the United Kingdom and the 27th year of greyhound racing in Ireland.

== Roll of honour ==
Major Winners
Award	Name of Winner
1953 English Greyhound Derby	Daws Dancer
1953 Irish Greyhound Derby	Spanish Battleship
1953 Scottish Greyhound Derby	Not held
1953 Welsh Greyhound Derby	Glittering Look
Greyhound of the Year	Magourna Reject

== Summary ==
The annual totalisator was £61,522,849 which constituted a solid year. The main stars of the year were Spanish Battleship, in Ireland and Magourna Reject, in the United Kingdom.

== Competitions ==
There was a surprise in store during the first major event of the year when 1951 Scurry Gold Cup runner up Mushera Silver won the Gold Collar, at 13-2 beating Monachdy Girlie by two lengths. The Scottish Greyhound Derby was cancelled for the second successive year due to insufficient entries but the Welsh Greyhound Derby received a high standard of entry. Glittering Look made amends for his unlucky Derby performance beating fellow Derby finalists Small Town, Galtee Cleo in addition to Endless Gossip and Ollys Pal.

A competition called the London Tracks Coursing Cup (confined to London track greyhounds) was held near Cambridge and was won by Must Venture trained by Bill Cowell at Wandsworth Stadium. It was an unusual competition because it was becoming increasingly rare for track greyhounds to take part in coursing.

Paddys Dinner who had finished lame in the 1952 English Greyhound Derby reached the Scurry final in July but lost out to Rolling Mike while Daws Dancer made a final appearance for Paddy McEvoy in the Laurels final, before being sold to Wimbledon Stadium Ltd and leased to W J Cearns.

At Wembley, 30,000 people turned up to watch the final of the St Leger, a race that was also seen by several million on television. Defending champion Funny Worker now with Jack Harvey was not expected to beat Magourna Reject but the latter had failed in the classics during 1952. Magourna Reject, now trained by Tom Reilly, had won the Key at Wimbledon, the Stewards Cup at Gloucester and the Wood Lane Stakes at White City before lining up for the St Leger final. His supporters were rewarded as he easily won by five lengths, Funny Worker finished last. Magourna Reject then defeated his rivals in the Cesarewitch final winning by three and a half lengths from Oaks champion Lizette, his time of 33.24sec being the fastest ever for the distance at West Ham Stadium. Magourna Reject had finished 1953 as double classic champion and was voted Greyhound of the Year by a press panel on behalf of the British Greyhound Breeders and Owners Association.

== News ==
After a misunderstanding, a greyhound called Captain Jock trained by Frank Conlon ran unplaced in an open race at Stamford Bridge in the afternoon and then ran again in the evening at Clapton Stadium without success. It was a regular practice for greyhounds to race early in a racecard to qualify for a final later but very unusual to have to travel to two tracks in the same day. Noreen Collin relinquished her post at the Walthamstow Stadium kennels and was replaced by Tom 'Paddy' Reilly; the kennels included the great Magourna Reject.

Scotland Yard detective Stan Baker published a book called Greyhound Racing with the lid off. It listed 29 stimulants and depressants that are suspected of being used by doping gangs in greyhound racing. The National Greyhound Racing Club (NGRC) are tasked with finding the doping gangs that target tracks running under the NGRC banner and on the independent circuit, two men were jailed for 30 days in Dunfermline for attempting to run a ringer at Crossgates Greyhound Stadium.

Endless Gossip retired after finishing his career with a Select Stakes win at Wembley beating Magourna Reject and Galtee Cleo and a Wimbledon Champion Stakes win in October, which he again won from Magourna Reject with Galtee Cleo third, and brought his winnings to more than £5,000. He won a prize in the show ring at Cruft's and was sold to an American breeder to stand at stud in the United States.

== Ireland ==
Tim O'Connor had taken charge of the litter in Ireland, sired by Spanish Chestnut, the half-brother of Irish Greyhound Derby champion Spanish Lad. One of the litter Spanish Battleship was entered for the St Leger at Limerick but after winning a heat he failed to progress from the second round. O'Connor believed that he had gone well enough and phoned Tom Lynch in Dublin and asked him to train the dog for the 1953 Irish Greyhound Derby. He duly won the Derby and then took part in three competitions; the Laurels, the McCalmont Cup and McAlinden Cup and won every single qualifier, nine races in all but on all three occasions did not win the final. The Laurels had been won by Templenoe Rebel, who then made his way to be trained in England as did McAlinden winner Rose of Meath, sold to Arsenal and Scotland footballer Alex Forbes.

== Principal UK races ==
Grand National, White City (May 9 525y h, £300)
Pos	Name of Greyhound	Trainer	SP	Time	Trap
1st	Denver Berwick	David Geggus	10-11f	30.26	5
2nd	Nighthar O'Leer		100-8	30.56	3
3rd	Tunny Dick	Norman Merchant	6-4	30.70	2
4th	Brighton Master	R.C Ford	25-1	31.06	4
5th	Water Chief		10-1	31.54	6
N/R	Lambourn Toreador	O Papps			1

Gold Collar, Catford (May 30, 440y, £500)
Pos	Name of Greyhound	Trainer	SP	Time	Trap
1st	Mushera Silver	L.T.Gould	13-2	25.70	3
2nd	Monachdy Girlie	Jimmy Jowett	3-1	25.90	1
3rd	Carlane Briskie	L.T.Gould	8-1	26.04	5
4th	Iona Special	Ron Chamberlain	5-2f	26.06	2
5th	Summer Breeze		100-8	26.14	4
6th	Rockfield Nigger	Paddy McEvoy	3-1	26.50	6

Welsh Derby, Arms Park (Jul 4, 525y £500)
Pos	Name of Greyhound	Trainer	SP	Time	Trap
1st	Glittering Look	Tom Reilly	5-2	29.39	6
2nd	Small Town	Leslie Reynolds	100-8	29.47	5
3rd	Galtee Cleo	Jack Harvey	4-5f	29.55	1
4th	Montego Bay	Jack Harvey	33-1	29.67	2
5th	Endless Gossip	Leslie Reynolds	4-1	29.75	3
6th	Ollys Pal	Norman Merchant			4

Scurry Gold Cup, Clapton (Jul 25, 400y £600)
Pos	Name of Greyhound	Trainer	SP	Time	Trap
1st	Rolling Mike	Jimmy Jowett	5-2f	22.77+	6
2nd	Cavehill Tanner		13-2	23.27	1
3rd	Paddys Dinner	Tom Smith	4-1	23.41	2
4th	Al Fresco		100-6	23.63	4
5th	Parchments Breeze	Tom Reilly	11-4	23.95	3
6th	Snow White Brown	Henry Parsons	4-1	23.98	5

+ Track Record

Laurels, Wimbledon (Aug 21, 500y, £1,000)
Pos	Name of Greyhound	Trainer	SP	Time	Trap
1st	Polonius	Tom Reilly	7-2	28.04	4
2nd	Knockeevan Champion	Leslie Reynolds	5-2	28.24	5
3rd	Flashy Name	Paddy Power	20-1	28.48	2
4th	Marsh Harrier	William Mills	5-1	28.60	6
5th	Daws Dancer	Paddy McEvoy	7-4f	28.63	3
6th	Oriel Olga	Dal Hawkesley	20-1	28.66	1

St Leger, Wembley (Sep 14, 700y, £1,000)
Pos	Name of Greyhound	Trainer	SP	Time	Trap
1st	Magourna Reject	Tom Reilly	7-4f	39.88	4
2nd	Lizette	Paddy Fortune	6-1	40.36	5
3rd	Priceless Spot	F.A.Gavin	100-6	40.58	2
4th	Cheeky Tippy	Bob Burls	9-1	40.78	3
5th	Fly Prince	W.E.Hughes	9-4	41.02	1
6th	Funny Worker	Jack Harvey	6-1	41.06	6

Oaks, White City (Sep 26, 525y, £500)
Pos	Name of Greyhound	Trainer	SP	Time	Trap
1st	Lizette	Paddy Fortune	6-4f	29.18	5
2nd	Waltzers Choice	Reg String Marsh	2-1	29.66	2
3rd	Narrogar Joanna	Ron Mills	8-1	29.74	3
4th	Marazion Millie	Paddy Fortune	11-2	29.82	1
5th	Ashcott Winsome	Eric Hiscock	8-1	30.00	4
6th	Great Charm		33-1	30.52	6

Cesarewitch, West Ham (Oct 16, 600y, £600)
Pos	Name of Greyhound	Trainer	SP	Time	Trap
1st	Magourna Reject	Tom Reilly	1-4f	33.24+	4
2nd	Lizette	Paddy Fortune	9-2	33.60	2
3rd	Kensington Perfection	Bill Higgins	25-1	33.96	1
4th	Wolf Wild	John Drown	100-7	34.14	6
5th	Ardskeagh Ville	Dave Barker	50-1	34.24	3
6th	Narrogar Joanna	Ron Mills	50-1	34.34	5

+ Track Record

== Totalisator returns ==
Extended content

The totalisator returns declared to the licensing authorities for the year 1953 are listed below. Tracks that did not have a totalisator in operation are not listed.

Stadium	Turnover £
London (White City)	4,799,000
London (Harringay)	3,336,000
London (Wembley)	2,616,000
London (Wimbledon)	2,422,000
London (Walthamstow)	2,397,000
London (Wandsworth)	1,796,783
London (Park Royal)	1,729,033
London (Clapton)	1,695,177
London (West Ham)	1,693,000
Manchester (Belle Vue)	1,613,649
London (Stamford Bridge)	1,577,000
London (Catford)	1,558,116
London (Hackney)	1,297,000
London (New Cross)	1,145,000
London (Hendon)	1,042,000
Manchester (White City)	936,800
Romford	847,000
Brighton & Hove	836,133
London (Charlton)	826,000
Glasgow (Shawfield)	815,000
Newcastle (Brough Park)	737,000
Edinburgh (Powderhall)	732,000
Newcastle (Gosforth)	723,000
Birmingham (Hall Green)	714,283
Birmingham (Perry Barr, old)	707,000
Crayford & Bexleyheath	681,533
Cardiff (Arms Park)	664,000
Manchester (Salford)	656,933
London (Dagenham)	644,000
Sheffield (Owlerton)	630,050
Wolverhampton (Monmore)	609,000
Glasgow (White City)	541,000
Birmingham (Kings Heath)	530,700
Gateshead	524,916
Bradford (Greenfield)	511,566
Southampton	509,850
Bristol (Eastville)	487,000
Southend-on-Sea	472,650

Stadium	Turnover £
Leeds (Elland Road)	472,000
Glasgow (Albion)	463,000
Coventry (Lythalls Lane)	462,000
Slough	449,966
Liverpool (Seaforth)	444,750
Sheffield (Darnall)	423,000
Willenhall	413,000
Ramsgate (Dumpton Park)	411,133
Blackpool (St Anne's)	406,500
Middlesbrough	395,000
Glasgow (Carntyne)	390,000
Liverpool (White City)	361,733
Reading (Oxford Road)	358,000
South Shields	351,230
Leicester (Blackbird Rd)	341,000
Ashington (Co Durham)	331,000
Bolton	327,567
Gloucester & Cheltenham	320,517
Chester	301,000
Rochester & Chatham	299,200
Liverpool (Stanley)	287,533
Bradford (City)	264,233
Hull (Old Craven Park)	264,000
Preston	257,950
Plymouth	251,000
Nottingham (White City)	248,000
Portsmouth	242,000
Aberdeen	228,000
Newport	216,000
West Hartlepool	214,000
Blackburn	213,000
Sheffield (Hyde Park)	212,983
Derby	212,250
Stanley (Co Durham)	205,000
Oxford	202,000
Warrington	197,667
Sunderland	194,250
Exeter (County Ground)	184,467

Stadium	Turnover £
Stoke-on-Trent (Cobridge)	184,000
Stoke-on-Trent (Hanley)	182,000
Glasgow (Firhill)	179,000
Yarmouth	167,167
Keighley	167,000
Luton	162,000
Norwich (Boundary Park)	157,517
Bristol (Knowle)	149,533
Norwich (City)	145,633
Houghton-le-Spring	140,000
St Helens	133,000
Ipswich	127,750
London (Southall)	119,000
Rochdale	111,900
Wallyford (East Lothian)	103,000
Oldham	102,000
Peterborough	97,933
Rayleigh (Essex)	90,000
Cradley Heath	89,450
Stockton-on-Tees (Belle Vue)	89,000
Stockport (Hazel Grove)	84,267
Long Eaton	80,950
Easington (Co Durham)	77,000
Swindon	73,933
Wigan (Poolstock)	68,000
London (Harlington Corner)	64,000
Wakefield	61,000
Wigan (Woodhouse)	56,000
Aycliffe (Co Durham)	53,000
Durham City	53,000
Tamworth	50,000
Doncaster (Spotbrough)	49,000
Rotherham	45,000
Northampton	40,000
Spennymoor (Co Durham)	37,950
Workington	27,000
Coundon (Co Durham)	19,000
Irvine (Townhead)	7,000
