= Wandsworth Stadium =

Former greyhound racing venue in London

- Interactive map of Wandsworth Stadium
- Location: Wandsworth, London
- Coordinates: 51°27′14″N 0°11′37″W
- Operator: London Stadiums Ltd

Construction
- Opened: 1933
- Closed: 1966

Tenant
- Greyhound racing

Wandsworth Stadium was a greyhound racing stadium in Wandsworth, London, England.

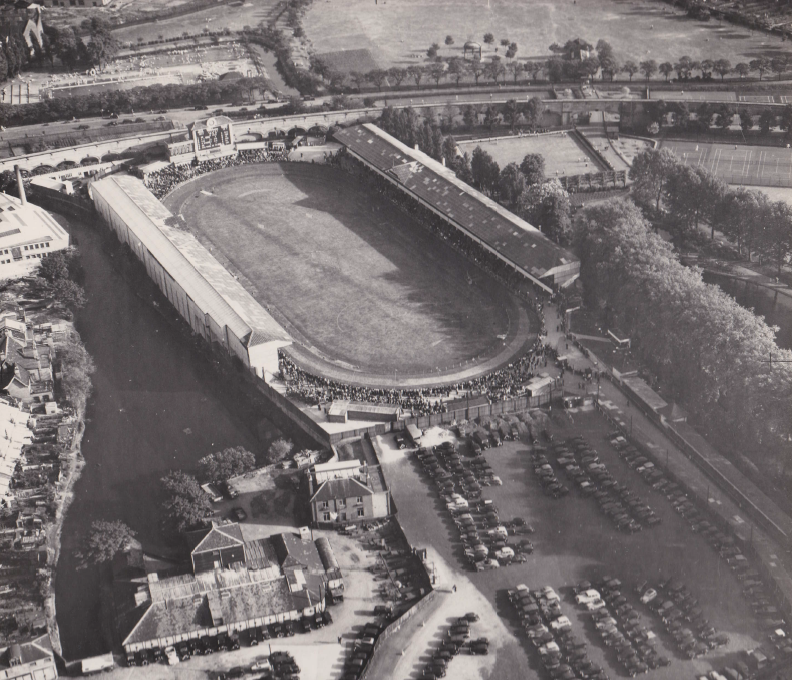
Wandsworth Stadium c.1950

== Origins ==
The stadium was constructed on an area of unused land south of the Wandsworth reservoir between Garratt Lane (formerly South Street) and Buckhold Road. Just to the south was King Georges Park (a public nursery, tennis courts, bowls green, swimming and paddling pools). This tranquil setting was unfortunately ruined by an unsightly storm relief sewage aqueduct that ran straight over and through the middle of it.

== Opening ==
Wandsworth stadium cost £100,000 to build and could accommodate 20,000 spectators; either side of the track were two large covered stands that could each seat 7,000 people. The stadium opened on Saturday 15 April 1933, accompanied by the HM Scots Guards band.

The local Borough News reported that a former Chelsea player Alex Jackson had bought a greyhound called Jovial Honey and was keen for the Wandsworth management to consider allowing football to be played at the stadium. The stadium was reputed to have created dozens of jobs for Wandsworth residents during a difficult time that was known as the Great Depression in the United Kingdom.

== History ==
In 1936 rival gangs fought a battle in front of thousands of witnesses and one man was murdered after being stabbed to death. However racing soon returned to normal trading and in 1938 the Eclipse was introduced which would become a prominent competition in the racing calendar. War disrupted regular racing but in August 1942 when the great wartime greyhound Ballynennan Moon appeared at the track he broke the track record over 440 yards.

In 1945 the Daily Herald reported that Wandsworth Stadium Ltd (the company that owned the track) was subject to over 97% government tax deductions. Sidney Parkes the owner of the company revealed that gross profit was £430,000 of which £420,000 was taken by the government in various taxes leaving just £10,000 net profit. He stated "What a money making proposition dog racing is to the Labour government."

The following summer (1946) greyhound racing experienced an extraordinary high with phenomenal attendances, the attendance figures for 1946 (licensed tracks only) topped 50 million and tote returns were in excess of £196 million (£196,431,430.00). It was during this period that a company called London Stadiums Ltd brokered a deal to take over Wandsworth Stadium Ltd, Park Royal Stadium Ltd and Charlton Stadium (1936) Ltd. The three companies that were taken over all received shares in London Stadiums Ltd.

Wandsworth transported their racing hounds from the track kennels to the race track by using a 'Scammell Mechanical Horse' that pulled a trailer of 56 greyhounds housed in their individual cages.

In 1947 a greyhound called Motts Regret reached the Wandsworth Spring Stakes final where he finished second to Balmaha. Motts regret would change his name to Trevs Perfection, the 1947 English Greyhound Derby winner. The same year another major competition was introduced called the Olympic, this race paired with the Eclipse would result in many of the sport's top hounds frequenting the track.

The Director of Racing for all of the London Stadiums Ltd tracks was Mr R E C Parkes and Racing Manager at Wandsworth was Mr K A Guy. Bill Francis was an Assistant Racing Manager in the late fifties.

In 1955 Wandsworth hurdle grader Moyshna Queen starred alongside Frankie Howerd in a film called Jumping for Joy. The bitch was called Lindy Lou in the film.

In 1961 Charles Boulton replaced Mr Guy as Racing Manager and his assistant was John Rowe who would soon become the Leicester Stadium Racing Manager. One year later Charlton closed temporarily following difficulties and the Cloth of Gold competition was switched to sister track Wandsworth. Trainers at the track in 1965 were Hourigan, Nattriss, O’Shaughnessy, Holyhead and Bill Cowell.

=== Sunbury Kennels ===
All three stadia, Wandsworth, Park Royal and Charlton Stadium were served by the Sunbury Kennels, which were located in a rural setting on Hanworth Road in Sunbury-on-Thames twelve miles from Park Royal Stadium. The kennels which were built in 1933 at the cost of £25,000 sat in fourteen acres and had accommodation for 600 greyhounds. In addition to the kennels there was a veterinary surgery including X-ray, Ultraviolet and Infrared ray apparatus, with the kennel staff and veterinary surgeon living on site. The self-contained exercising grounds included over three quarters of a mile of special track for road work. The establishment had its own kitchens, bakery and isolation kennels (for sickness). One of the early kennel managers was Mr Cadwallader who organised 12 trainers (4 per stadium), each with their own stadium related section. Total staff numbered 80 and the kennels were seen as the equivalent for London Stadiums Ltd that the Hook Estate and Kennels was for the Greyhound Racing Association.

== Closure ==
News broke in January 1963 that London Stadiums Ltd had future plans to redevelop the stadium into a shopping centre.

Wandsworth closed on 4 June 1966 stating that it could not compete with big local tracks, West Ham, Walthamstow, Wembley and White City but this was a smokescreen with plans afoot to sell the stadium and prime land for re-development. The American style Arndale Centres had first been introduced to the UK in 1961 and the pedestrianised mall type centre was constructed in Wandsworth in quick time. The centre still exists today and is called the Southside shopping centre.

== Achievements ==
In 1941 Miss D Thomas trained Heavy Damages to Guineas glory at Park Royal Stadium. In 1947 Rowley won the Hunt Cup for Wandsworth trainer O’Shaughnessy. An event held near Cambridge in 1953 called the 'London Tracks Coursing Cup' went to Must Venture trained by Bill Cowell at Wandsworth.

== Competitions ==
=== Cloth of Gold ===
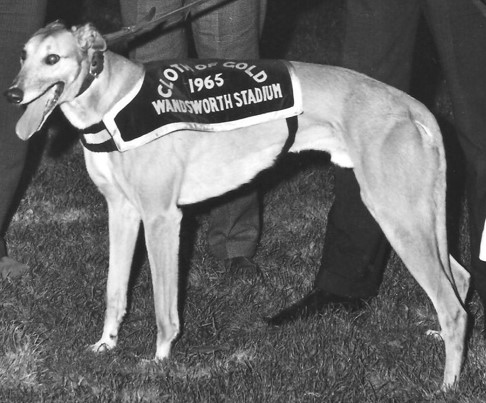
Clifden Orbit, 1965 Cloth of Gold winner

Year	Winner	Breeding	Trainer	Time	SP
1941	Victory Welcomed	Border Mutton – Worsted Wayward	J Noonan (Private)	34.56	7-2
1943	Jubilee Time	Fine Jubilee – Winning Time	Leslie Reynolds (Wembley)	23.62	1-3f
1945	Another Farewell		Dal Hawkesley (West Ham)	35.14	1-2f
1946	Mondays News	Orlucks Best – Monday Next	Fred Farey (Private)	35.10	4-7f
1947	Kilrid Hero		Tom Johnston Sr. (West Ham)	35.28	7-2
1948	Young Pretender	Chieftain - Blackstreets	R H Clark (Private)	35.22	100-8
1949	Captain Lake	Captain Brown – Banna Lake	Jack Harvey (Wembley)	35.64	3-1
1950	Coolafin		Sidney Orton (Wimbledon)	36.10	7-1
1951	Push Hard	D.X.Rice – Just Push	J E Scott (Charlton)	35.15	7-2
1952	Dublin Darkie		Paddy McEvoy (Private)	34.63	1-3f
1953	Kilcurry Ranger		Jack Toseland (Perry Barr)	34.86	5-1
1954	Prince Chancer	Fire Prince – Palm Swell	Jimmy Jowett (Clapton)	34.35	4-7f
1955	Pancho Villa	Mad Birthday - Golden Withins	Jack Harvey (Wembley)	34.86	3-1
1956	Come To Mama		J Taylor (Private)	35.22	6-1
1957	Kilcaskin Kern	Magourna Reject - Pavona	Tony Dennis (Private)	34.74	3-1
1958	Kilcaskin Kern	Magourna Reject - Pavona	Tony Dennis (Private)	35.13	1-1f
1959	Coolkill Racket	Collkill Nigger- Tennis Racket	Reg Holland (Private)	34.41	7-4
1960	Noonas Rhapsody	Ballymac Ball – Vahsel Bay	Jimmy Jowett (Clapton)	34.46	5-1
1961	Golden Arrow II	Solar Prince – Nepey Lass	Bob Burls (Wembley)	34.76	
1962	Daytona Kid	Racing Man – Silver Kid	Tom Johnston Sr. (West Ham)	38.93	
1963	Music Guest	Solar Prince – The Grand Duchess	Tom Johnston Jr. (West Ham)	38.72	
1964	Poor Linda	Hi There – Kilcomney Queen	George Waterman (Wimbledon)	38.08	11-4
1965	Clifden Orbit	The Grand Prince – Pink View	Tom Johnston Jr. (West Ham)	37.85	
1966	Cons Duke	Crazy Parachute – Cons Diet	Lionel Maxen (Hackney)	34.63	
1967	Cheek To Cheek	Hi Con - Benison	Paddy Keane (Clapton)	36.12	
1968	Quiet Cheer	Golden Cheers – Vals Pet	Joe Booth (Private)	34.70	

(1941-61 Charlton 600 yards), (1962-65 Wandsworth 650 yards), (1966-68 Charlton 600 yards)

== Track records ==
Yards	Greyhound	Time (sec)	Date	Notes/ref
440	Johnny Handicraft	23.36	23 July 1960	
440	Ballynennan Moon	25.27	2 August 1942	
440	Mondays News	25.12	8 May 1948	
440	Town Prince	25.22	1 May 1958	
600	Dante II	34.57	19 July 1947	Olympic Final
600	Fly Red II	34.98	16 August 1958	
650	Desert Rambler	38.25	October 1961	Olympic heats
650	Clonalvy Pride	38.23	October 1961	Olympic heats
650	Carols Champion	38.00	1963	
650	Vals Parachute	37.72	24 July 1965	
825	Arena Belle	48.67	1963	
825	Blue Hill Miss	48.62	7 August 1965	
440 H	Keep a Trump	26.57	16 August 1941	
440 H	Prince Fodda	25.83	18 May 1964	
600 H	Fodda Champion	35.81	5 June 1958	
650 H	Fairyfield Surprise	39.04	28 September 1963	

- H = hurdles
