= 1952 UK & Ireland Greyhound Racing Year =

The 1952 UK & Ireland Greyhound Racing Year was the 27th year of greyhound racing in the United Kingdom and the 26th year of greyhound racing in Ireland.

== Roll of honour ==
Major Winners
Award	Name of Winner
1952 English Greyhound Derby	Endless Gossip
1952 Irish Greyhound Derby	Rough Waters
1952 Scottish Greyhound Derby	Not held
1952 Welsh Greyhound Derby	Endless Gossip
Greyhound of the Year	Endless Gossip

== Summary ==
The annual totalisator was £64,263,725, which indicated that the industry had stabilised following a few turbulent years.

The year focused on the performances of two greyhounds, Endless Gossip and Magourna Reject. Despite the fact that Magourna Reject had failed to land a classic competition during the year, he drew the crowds everywhere he went and Endless Gossip was denied the chance to win the Triple Crown because the Scottish Greyhound Derby had been cancelled.

== Competitions ==
Match racing was still popular even twenty years after the Mick the Miller era. One such match was between XPDNC (the Grand National champion against this year's favourite Lambourn Blackflash. Lambourn Blackflash won by five lengths and both competed in the Grand National at White City during May. The two rivals qualified for the final, but it was a 20-1 shot (Whistling Laddie) who upset the odds beating Lambourn Blackflash by one and a quarter lengths, XPDNC finished fifth in the first Grand National to contain six dogs.

The National Intertrack Championship sponsored by the News of the World was won by Eastville after the Bristol track defeated Bradford 19–11. Endless Gossip travelled to Cardiff Arms Park after winning the 1952 English Greyhound Derby and added the Welsh Greyhound Derby final defeating a field including Magourna Reject, Ballylanigan Tanist and Drumman Rambler.

Monachdy Girlie trained by Jimmy Jowett, won the Scurry Gold Cup and Endless Gossip then won the Laurels at Wimbledon Stadium which now offered £1,000 to the winner. Magourna Reject was switched to the longer distances but failed to win both the Cesarewitch and St Leger and looked destined to never win a classic race. Monachdy Girlie won a second classic after a dead heat in the Oaks The Grand Prix competition was not run due to insufficient entries.

== Tracks ==
The Abbey Stadium in Swindon opened on 1 November. The stadium was opened by the Bristol Greyhound Racing Association, soon to change their name to Bristol Stadium Ltd and they also took control of affairs at Oxford Stadium, following the death of Managing Director Leslie Calcutt.

== News ==
Trainer Stan Biss died after suffering a stroke and failing to recover and the well-respected Managing Director of Catford Stadium, Frank Sutton also died. Sutton had introduced the British Breeders Produce Stakes. Laughing Lieutenant was the first stud dog to fly to Ireland for breeding purposes and trainer Jack Tallantire joined the New Cross Stadium training ranks.

The National Greyhound Racing Club made the weighing of greyhounds before a race compulsory.

== Ireland ==
Racing in Ireland was experiencing a boom as attendances flocked to see the racing. A greyhound called Rough Waters had spent 1951 flapping (racing on independent tracks), in Scotland before being aimed towards Shelbourne Park and the Irish Greyhound Derby. Owned by one of Ireland's leading bookmakers Jimmy Lalor and trained by his brother Henry, the brindle went on to win the Derby final.

== Principal UK races ==
Grand National, White City (May 9 525y h, £300)
Pos	Name of Greyhound	Trainer	SP	Time	Trap
1st	Whistling Laddie	Stan Martin	20-1	30.13	2
2nd	Lambourn Blackflash	O Papps	7-4f	30.23	1
3rd	Funny Prince	Les Parry	100-6	30.25	6
4th	Drumman Rambler	Olly Chetland	3-1	30.29	4
5th	XPDNC	Les Parry	20-1	30.39	5
6th	Cooleen Flyer	Tom Reilly	2-1	30.57	3

Gold Collar, Catford (May 31, 440y, £600)
Pos	Name of Greyhound	Trainer	SP	Time	Trap
1st	Hectic Birthday	Ronnie Melville	10-1	25.41+	4
2nd	Fitzsman	Leslie Reynolds	8-1	25.65	6
3rd	Fawn Wind	Jonathan Hopkins	7-4f	25.71	5
4th	Denver Colonist	Pam Heasman	3-1	25.93	3
5th	Yew Berry	Stan Martin	9-2	26.03	2
6th	Carlane Briskie	Reg Holland	4-1	26.17	1

+Track Record

Welsh Derby, Arms Park (Jul 5, 525y £500)
Pos	Name of Greyhound	Trainer	SP	Time	Trap
1st	Endless Gossip	Leslie Reynolds	7-4	29.41	1
2nd	Magourna Reject	Noreen Collin	4-5f	30.01	3
3rd	Ballylanigan Tanist	Leslie Reynolds	7-2	30.11	6
4th	Drumman Rambler	Olly Chetland	20-1	30.29	5
5th	Outcast Bally		66-1	30.51	4
N/R	Kind Comrade	Noreen Collin			

Scurry Gold Cup, Clapton (Jul 26, 400y £500)
Pos	Name of Greyhound	Trainer	SP	Time	Trap
1st	Monachdy Girlie	Jimmy Jowett	4-1	23.08	5
2nd	Tams Taigle	Ronnie Melville	9-2	23.36	6
3rd	Carlane Briskie	Reg Holland	9-2	23.52	1
4th	Kilcool Griston		33-1	23.60	3
5th	Minorcas Hope	Frank Conlon	11-8f	23.90	2
6th	Marazion Michael	Paddy Fortune	7-1	24.14	4

Laurels, Wimbledon (Aug 22, 500y, £1,000)
Pos	Name of Greyhound	Trainer	SP	Time	Trap
1st	Endless Gossip	Leslie Reynolds	2-11f	27.96	1
2nd	Ballylanigan Tanist	Leslie Reynolds	6-1	28.10	4
3rd	Midnight Charlotte	Stan Martin	33-1	28.20	2
4th	Denver Colonist	Pam Heasman	20-1	28.38	6
5th	Happy Luck		33-1	28.54	3
N/R	Magic Blackbird				

St Leger, Wembley (Sep 8, 700y, £1,000)
Pos	Name of Greyhound	Trainer	SP	Time	Trap
1st	Funny Worker	Bob Burls	6-1	40.50	6
2nd	Malanna Mace	Henry Parsons	7-1	40.66	4
3rd	Shaggy Swank	Tom Lightfoot	50-1	40.88	5
4th	Magourna Reject	Noreen Collin	8-11f	40.90	3
5th	Mad Miller	Leslie Reynolds	7-2	40.91	1
6th	Mansion Bell	J.W.Bell	25-1	41.17	2

Oaks, White City (Sep 27, 525y, £500)
Pos	Name of Greyhound	Trainer	SP	Time	Trap
1st	Flos Pet*	Paddy Fortune	8-1	29.60	1
1st	Monachdy Girlie*	Jimmy Jowett	10-1	29.60	4
3rd	Lovely Birthday	Jack Harvey	11-4	29.62	2
4th	Shaggy Shale		100-8	29.68	3
5th	Ballinasloe Mona	Jack Harvey	10-11f	29.69	5
6th	Queen of the Roses II		100-1	29.79	6

- Dead-heat

Cesarewitch, West Ham (Oct 17, 600y, £600)
Pos	Name of Greyhound	Trainer	SP	Time	Trap
1st	Shaggy Swank	Tom Lightfoot	5-1	34.03	2
2nd	Magourna Reject	Noreen Collin	8-11f	34.23	6
3rd	Mansion Bell	J.W.Bell	11-2	34.43	5
4th	Outcast Surprise		20-1	34.69	3
5th	Mellow Mystery	Bert Heyes	11-2	34.81	4
6th	Smart Prince		10-1	35.35	1

== Totalisator returns ==
Extended content

The totalisator returns declared to the licensing authorities for the year 1952 are listed below. Tracks that did not have a totalisator in operation are not listed.

Stadium	Turnover £
London (White City)	4,955,981
London (Harringay)	3,352,649
London (Wembley)	2,918,149
London (Wimbledon)	2,752,199
London (Walthamstow)	2,543,822
London (Wandsworth)	1,836,266
London (Stamford Bridge)	1,750,349
London (Clapton)	1,741,183
London (Park Royal)	1,717,716
Manchester (Belle Vue)	1,717,283
London (West Ham)	1,675,649
London (Catford)	1,603,783
London (Hackney)	1,280,383
London (New Cross)	1,259,516
London (Hendon)	1,073,466
Manchester (White City)	973,583
Brighton & Hove	908,716
London (Charlton)	870,316
Glasgow (Shawfield)	861,266
Romford	857,950
Edinburgh (Powderhall)	811,050
Newcastle (Brough Park)	790,050
Birmingham (Perry Barr, old)	753,116
Birmingham (Hall Green)	752,100
Crayford & Bexleyheath	722,900
Manchester (Salford)	720,283
London (Dagenham)	703,200
Cardiff (Arms Park)	659,033
Newcastle (Gosforth)	633,350
Sheffield (Owlerton)	629,333
Glasgow (White City)	615,366
Wolverhampton (Monmore)	602,633
Bristol (Eastville)	563,466
Gateshead	548,183
Coventry (Lythalls Lane)	530,016
Southend-on-Sea	529,033
Bradford (Greenfield)	528,000

Stadium	Turnover £
Southampton	522,383
Liverpool (Seaforth)	492,766
Glasgow (Albion)	476,300
Leeds (Elland Road)	475,433
Glasgow (Carntyne)	467,565
Slough	465,800
Sheffield (Darnall)	442,166
Willenhall	434,366
Ramsgate (Dumpton Park)	412,967
Blackpool (St Anne's)	397,733
Liverpool (White City)	397,417
Birmingham (Kings Heath)	386,650
Bolton	372,733
South Shields	362,667
Middlesbrough	362,067
Leicester (Blackbird Rd)	357,483
Reading (Oxford Road)	353,983
Liverpool (Stanley)	346,283
Ashington (Co Durham)	330,967
Chester	320,033
Rochester & Chatham	319,850
Bradford (City)	298,483
Gloucester & Cheltenham	294,533
Derby	291,783
Hull (Old Craven Park)	289,467
Plymouth	283,600
Portsmouth	269,683
Preston	256,900
Aberdeen	248,000
Nottingham (White City)	247,733
Blackburn	245,483
West Hartlepool	229,717
Sheffield (Hyde Park)	228,317
Newport	223,650
Exeter (County Ground)	218,783
Stanley (Co Durham)	214,217
Glasgow (Firhill)	213,267

Stadium	Turnover £
Warrington	204,950
Oxford	194,783
Stoke-on-Trent (Cobridge)	183,583
Keighley	181,300
Sunderland	179,717
Yarmouth	179,233
Stoke-on-Trent (Hanley)	176,000
Norwich (City)	168,067
Norwich (Boundary Park)	165,683
Bristol (Knowle)	165,433
Luton	161,600
Cradley Heath	149,150
Houghton-le-Spring	148,467
Rochdale	126,300
London (Southall)	126,117
St Helens	125,217
Ipswich	122,167
Wallyford (East Lothian)	110,617
Peterborough	109,283
London (Harlington Corner)	100,217
Stockport (Hazel Grove)	95,200
Stockton-on-Tees (Belle Vue)	93,033
Rayleigh (Essex)	89,867
Easington (Co Durham)	85,333
Wigan (Poolstock)	71,350
Long Eaton	69,167
Wakefield	60,600
Wigan (Woodhouse)	60,050
Spennymoor (Co Durham)	57,683
Doncaster (Spotbrough)	55,517
Durham City	48,233
Northampton	41,117
Workington	38,883
Aycliffe (Co Durham)	10,833
Irvine (Townhead)	6,650
