= 1951 UK & Ireland Greyhound Racing Year =

The 1951 UK & Ireland Greyhound Racing Year was the 26th year of greyhound racing in the United Kingdom and the 25th year of greyhound racing in Ireland.

== Roll of honour ==
Major Winners
| Award | Name of Winner |
|---|---|
| 1951 English Greyhound Derby | Ballylanigan Tanist |
| 1951 Irish Greyhound Derby | Carmodys Tanist |
| 1951 Scottish Greyhound Derby | Rushton Smutty |
| 1951 Welsh Greyhound Derby | Ballylanigan Tanist |
| Greyhound of the Year | Rushton Smutty |

== Summary ==
The annual totalisator was £65,548,855, a fifth consecutive drop since 1946 but considerably more stable than the significant decreases experienced during 1950. Once again the blame was directed towards the government and their tax policies of 10% tote tax and an additional 45% entertainment tax. Two tracks closed claiming that they could not continue to trade under the current taxation. In January Tamworth Greyhound Stadium and in May White City Stadium (Newcastle), the latter closed after the Managing Director Mr Whatley reported unmanageable figures. The tote receipts were £75,000 of which £47,000 was taken out by taxation. Restrictions on gambling were very much still considered by the government to be in the interests of the general public.

A record 140 entries were received at the initial stage of the 1951 English Greyhound Derby, Ballylanigan Tanist would go on to win the event.

== Competitions ==
The first annual competition between tracks was held, called the News of the World National Intertrack championship. Owlerton provided a major shock when winning the competition.

The Welsh Greyhound Derby attracted many stars, with the newly crowned Derby champion Ballylanigan Tanist winning the final by six and a half-lengths from a line-up that included two other Derby finalists in Black Mire (who broke a toe while leading) and Rushton Smutty, in addition to Quare Customer and Derryboy Blackbird. Just one week later the final of the Scottish Greyhound Derby resulted in Rushton Smutty battling hard to defeat Ballylanigan Tanist by just three quarters. The Scurry Gold Cup final went to Defence Leader and featured an appearance by Ballycurren Garrett; the favourite Junes Idol finished a disappointing fifth.

The Laurels and St Leger were next up, with both carrying increased winner's prizes (£1,000) for the St Leger and (£875) for the Wimbledon Stadium event, constituting the second and third best sums on offer behind the Derby. Black Mire stepped up in distance for the St Leger and ran out an easy winner. The anticipated match up against Drastic O'Leer in the final failed to come to fruition, after the latter was withdrawn from the final. Earlier in the year Drastic O'Leer had won nine races in a row before losing in the Longcross Cup final. Ballylanigan Tanist further enhanced his reputation adding the Laurels trophy to his winning record. A newcomer Magourna Reject won the Trafalgar Cup and was described as the fastest ever puppy.

Walthamstow Stadium also increased the Grand Prix event to £750 and an extraordinary competition took place after the track record was broken four times. In the heats Ballyoulster Deemster recorded 29.76, followed by Rushton Smutty in 29.74. In the second round Olivers Lad was timed at 29.73 and during the semi-finals Rushton Smutty broke the record again with a 29.70 run before winning the final (his 16 win from his last 18 starts). Scurry champion Defence Leader finished runner up.

== News ==
Trainer Stan Biss retired and his kennels were taken over by a Pam Heasman and Jimmy Jowett joined Warrington. Biss died the following year, after suffering a stroke.

Hurdle racing finally allowed races with six greyhounds after being sanctioned by the National Greyhound Racing Club (NGRC) with plans to hold the first six runner Grand National the following year, this would be the first time since 1927 that this was allowed.

At the famous Aldridge's sales the greyhounds of Frank Davis came up for sale, Red Wind was bought for a record 610 guineas by Arthur Roberts of Torquay. This was followed by 1948 Irish Greyhound Derby champion Western Post, who was led from the bench unsold. Roberts's plans for Red Wind were probably flapping (independent racing) because the greyhound could not race under NGRC rules.

== Ireland ==
Spanish Chestnut was mated with Ballyseedy Memory and in August whelped a large litter of nine, one of the litter was named Spanish Battleship. The fawn brindle dog was reared by Sheila O'Connor sister of Tim O'Connor.

== Principal UK races ==
Grand National, White City (May 19 525y h, £300)
| Pos | Name of Greyhound | Trainer | SP | Time | Trap |
|---|---|---|---|---|---|
| 1st | XPDNC | Les Parry | 11-4jf | 29.80 | 1 |
| 2nd | Devil O'Leer | Norman Merchant | 11-4jf | 29.94 | 2 |
| 3rd | Q Majesty | Jerry Hannafin | 10-1 | 29.95 | 5 |
| 4th | Blossom of Annagura | Jack Sherry | 7-2 | 30.05 | 4 |
| 5th | Cooleen Flyer | Tom Reilly | 3-1 | 00.00 | 3 |

Gold Collar, Catford (Jun 2, 440y, £600)
| Pos | Name of Greyhound | Trainer | SP | Time | Trap |
|---|---|---|---|---|---|
| 1st | Loyal Accomplice | Tom Reilly | 4-5f | 25.63 | 6 |
| 2nd | Pluckanes Belle | J Mullins | 7-1 | 25.81 | 3 |
| 3rd | Cregglow Prince | Norman Merchant | 100-8 | 25.99 | 2 |
| 4th | Shannon Cherry | Paddy Power | 6-1 | 30.43 | 5 |
| 5th | Cool and Shaggy | H Copsey | 8-1 | 30.75 | 1 |
| 6th | Beaded Blew | Mrs F Stow | 11-2 | 30.78 | 4 |

Welsh Derby, Arms Park (Jul 7, 525y £500)
| Pos | Name of Greyhound | Trainer | SP | Time | Trap |
|---|---|---|---|---|---|
| 1st | Ballylanigan Tanist | Leslie Reynolds | 1-1f | 29.95 | 2 |
| 2nd | Derryboy Blackbird | Jack Harvey | 11-2 | 30.47 | 6 |
| 3rd | Rushton Smutty | Frank Johnson | 8-1 | 30.48 | 3 |
| 4th | Quare Customer | Leslie Reynolds | 10-1 | 30.72 | 4 |
| 5th | Black Mire | Jack Toseland | 3-1 | 30.74 | 5 |
| 6th | Behattan Mars | Bob Burls | 66-1 | 31.42 | 1 |

Scottish Greyhound Derby, Carntyne (Jul 14, 525y, £250)
| Pos | Name of Greyhound | Trainer | SP | Time | Trap |
|---|---|---|---|---|---|
| 1st | Rushton Smutty | Frank Johnson | 9-4 | 29.08 | 1 |
| 2nd | Ballylanigan Tanist | Leslie Reynolds | 1-1f | 29.14 | 3 |
| 3rd | Oozoo | Jimmy Jowett | 4-1 | 29.26 | 4 |
| 4th | Aughaway | W McLean | 100-8 | 29.42 | 2 |
| 5th | Ballylig Bolt | | 25-1 | 29.90 | 6 |
| 6th | Mad Companion II | Bob Burls | 100-8 | 30.14 | 5 |

Scurry Gold Cup, Clapton (Jul 28, 400y £500)
| Pos | Name of Greyhound | Trainer | SP | Time | Trap |
|---|---|---|---|---|---|
| 1st | Defence Leader | William Mills | 4-1 | 22.99 | 2 |
| 2nd | Mushera Silver | L Gould | 100-8 | 22.15 | 3 |
| 3rd | Ballycurreen Garrett | Jack Harvey | 10-3 | 22.47 | 5 |
| 4th | Ballyard Dick | | 8-1 | 22.53 | 1 |
| 5th | Junes Idol | Bert Stephens | 6-4f | 22.57 | 6 |
| 6th | Kilcolman Rover | Paddy McEllistrim | 9-2 | 22.93 | 4 |

Laurels, Wimbledon (Aug 24, 500y, £875)
| Pos | Name of Greyhound | Trainer | SP | Time | Trap |
|---|---|---|---|---|---|
| 1st | Ballylanigan Tanist | Leslie Reynolds | 8-11f | 28.37 | 2 |
| 2nd | Ryton Basher | Stan Martin | 5-2 | 28.53 | 4 |
| 3rd | Q Majesty | Jerry Hannafin | 25-1 | 28.85 | 1 |
| 4th | Palm Beach | Stan Martin | 10-1 | 28.86 | 6 |
| 5th | Magna Hasty | Stan Martin | 100-6 | 28.87 | 5 |
| 6th | Junes Idol | Bert Stephens | 10-1 | 28.93 | 3 |

St Leger, Wembley (Sep 17, 700y, £1,000)
| Pos | Name of Greyhound | Trainer | SP | Time | Trap |
|---|---|---|---|---|---|
| 1st | Black Mire | Jack Toseland | 2-1 | 40.19 | 3 |
| 2nd | Rapid Choice | Paddy McEvoy | 8-13f | 40.83 | 2 |
| 3rd | Pass on Express | Tom Lightfoot | 8-1 | 41.15 | 1 |
| 4th | Beautys Prince | Jeremiah O'Hea | 100-7 | 41.35 | 5 |
| 5th | Britannias Contest | W Major | 20-1 | 41.55 | 4 |
| 6th | Drastic O'Leer | Dave Geggus | | | 6 |

Oaks, White City (Sep 29, 525y, £500)
| Pos | Name of Greyhound | Trainer | SP | Time | Trap |
|---|---|---|---|---|---|
| 1st | Ballinasloe Mona | Jack Harvey | 6-4f | 29.28 | 2 |
| 2nd | Well Harmonized | T Cracknell | 3-1 | 29.42 | 6 |
| 3rd | Crooked Road Girl | Mrs F Stow | 9-4 | 29.45 | 1 |
| 4th | The Author | Reg 'String' Marsh | 100-6 | 29.61 | 5 |
| 5th | Luciole | | 8-1 | 29.75 | 3 |
| 6th | Welsh Flower | | 100-8 | 29.89 | 4 |

The Grand Prix Walthamstow (Oct 13, 525y, £750)
| Pos | Name of Greyhound | Trainer | SP | Time | Trap |
|---|---|---|---|---|---|
| 1st | Rushton Smutty | Frank Johnson | 4-6f | 29.80 | 6 |
| 2nd | Defence Leader | William Mills | 33-1 | 30.00 | 4 |
| 3rd | Derryboy Blackbird | Jack Harvey | 7-2 | 30.03 | 2 |
| 4th | Murex of Munster | William Mills | 5-1 | 30.15 | 1 |
| 5th | Olivers Lad | Jack Brennan | 100-7 | 30.31 | 3 |
| 6th | Mad Companion II | Bob Burls | 10-1 | 30.55 | 5 |

Cesarewitch, West Ham (Oct 19, 600y, £600)
| Pos | Name of Greyhound | Trainer | SP | Time | Trap |
|---|---|---|---|---|---|
| 1st | Prisona Luath | Bob Burls | 10-11f | 33.77 | 6 |
| 2nd | Mad Miller | Leslie Reynolds | 10-1 | 33.87 | 4 |
| 3rd | Elegant Derry | Clare Orton | 10-1 | 33.99 | 1 |
| 4th | Black Mire | Jack Toseland | 10-3 | 34.13 | 5 |
| 5th | Well Harmonized | T Cracknell | 33-1 | 34.43 | 2 |
| 6th | Camel Back | Tom Lightfoot | 4-1 | 34.44 | 3 |

== Totalisator Returns ==
Extended content

The totalisator returns declared to the licensing authorities for the year 1951 are listed below. Tracks that did not have a totalisator in operation are not listed.

| Stadium | Turnover £ |
|---|---|
| London (White City) | 5,040,288 |
| London (Harringay) | 3,582,599 |
| London (Wembley) | 3,128,916 |
| London (Wimbledon) | 3,023,620 |
| London (Walthamstow) | 2,572,369 |
| London (Wandsworth) | 1,903,075 |
| London (West Ham) | 1,858,773 |
| London (Clapton) | 1,857,766 |
| London (Stamford Bridge) | 1,856,630 |
| Manchester (Belle Vue) | 1,781,666 |
| London (Park Royal) | 1,758,552 |
| London (Catford) | 1,636,336 |
| London (Hackney) | 1,361,304 |
| London (New Cross) | 1,308,561 |
| London (Hendon) | 1,161,486 |
| Manchester (White City) | 989,987 |
| Glasgow (Shawfield) | 930,462 |
| Brighton & Hove | 916,691 |
| London (Charlton) | 894,514 |
| Romford | 834,363 |
| Edinburgh (Powderhall) | 834,071 |
| Crayford & Bexleyheath | 818,141 |
| Manchester (Salford) | 773,779 |
| Birmingham (Perry Barr, old) | 753,626 |
| Birmingham (Hall Green) | 748,401 |
| London (Dagenham) | 688,266 |
| Newcastle (Brough Park) | 674,125 |
| Cardiff (Arms Park) | 646,953 |
| Sheffield (Owlerton) | 616,609 |
| Glasgow (White City) | 612,372 |
| Gateshead | 591,662 |
| Wolverhampton (Monmore) | 574,776 |
| Newcastle (Gosforth) | 572,036 |
| Bristol (Eastville) | 556,036 |
| Liverpool (Seaforth) | 550,360 |
| Birmingham (Kings Heath) | 549,601 |
| Southend-on-Sea | 546,599 |

| Stadium | Turnover £ |
|---|---|
| Southampton | 536,760 |
| Bradford (Greenfield) | 536,055 |
| Glasgow (Albion) | 495,479 |
| Coventry (Lythalls Lane) | 487,123 |
| Glasgow (Carntyne) | 469,228 |
| Leeds (Elland Road) | 462,038 |
| Sheffield (Darnall) | 446,264 |
| Slough | 439,041 |
| Liverpool (White City) | 434,780 |
| Blackpool (St Anne's) | 434,632 |
| Ramsgate (Dumpton Park) | 417,126 |
| Willenhall | 407,581 |
| South Shields | 399,107 |
| Liverpool (Stanley) | 386,195 |
| Bolton | 378,406 |
| Leicester (Blackbird Rd) | 356,788 |
| Middlesbrough | 347,278 |
| Reading (Oxford Road) | 345,567 |
| Sheffield (Hyde Park) | 337,049 |
| Chester | 321,549 |
| Rochester & Chatham | 307,743 |
| Derby | 307,359 |
| Hull (Old Craven Park) | 306,344 |
| Portsmouth | 305,157 |
| Gloucester & Cheltenham | 303,743 |
| Ashington (Co Durham) | 300,743 |
| Bradford (City) | 292,650 |
| Plymouth | 284,989 |
| Blackburn | 280,038 |
| Preston | 252,657 |
| Aberdeen | 245,965 |
| Nottingham (White City) | 242,846 |
| Stoke-on-Trent (Cobridge) | 236,011 |
| West Hartlepool | 233,123 |
| Glasgow (Firhill) | 224,331 |
| Exeter (County Ground) | 223,303 |
| Newport | 218,157 |

| Stadium | Turnover £ |
|---|---|
| Warrington | 213,891 |
| Stoke-on-Trent (Hanley) | 209,438 |
| Doncaster (Spotbrough) | 197,719 |
| Keighley | 197,719 |
| Stanley (Co Durham) | 192,496 |
| Yarmouth | 185,502 |
| Norwich (City) | 182,145 |
| Luton | 178,767 |
| Bristol (Knowle) | 170,649 |
| Oxford | 152,996 |
| Norwich (Boundary Park) | 150,925 |
| Sunderland | 146,205 |
| Cradley Heath | 135,836 |
| Houghton-le-Spring | 135,649 |
| Ipswich | 134,409 |
| St Helens | 132,202 |
| Rochdale | 131,204 |
| Wallyford (East Lothian) | 117,721 |
| Oldham | 113,168 |
| Stockport (Hazel Grove) | 97,286 |
| Peterborough | 94,376 |
| Ayr (Tams Brig) | 89,618 |
| Wigan (Poolstock) | 81,250 |
| Easington (Co Durham) | 72,017 |
| Wakefield | 65,940 |
| Stockton-on-Tees (Belle Vue) | 65,669 |
| Wigan (Woodhouse) | 65,151 |
| Spennymoor (Co Durham) | 54,008 |
| Rotherham | 48,004 |
| Workington | 38,420 |
| Northampton | 38,304 |
| Durham City | 37,991 |
| Coundon (Co Durham) | 31,500 |
| Pelaw Grange (Co Durham) | 25,802 |
| Barry | 25,054 |
| Belmont (Co Durham) | 14,920 |
| Irvine (Townhead) | 6,306 |
