= 1953 English Greyhound Derby =

- Location: White City Stadium
- Start date: 13 June
- End date: 27 June
- Total prize money: £1,250 (winner)

The 1953 Greyhound Derby Final took place during June with the final being held on 27 June 1953 at White City Stadium. The winner was Daws Dancer and the winning owner Mr D J Fitzgerald received £1,250.

== Final result ==
At White City (over 525 yards):

Position	Name of Greyhound	Breeding	Trap	SP	Time	Trainer
1st	Daws Dancer	Daw - Castleview Dancer	5	10-1	29.20	Paddy McEvoy (Private)
2nd	Galtee Cleo	Sandown Champion - Cleopatra	1	4-5f	29.24	Jack Harvey (Wembley)
3rd	Small Town	Bah's Choice - Pretty Waltzer	3	11-2	29.42	Leslie Reynolds (Wembley)
4th	Tonic	Sandown Champion - Simple Jess	6	100-8	29.60	Ronnie Melville (Wembley)
5th	Glittering Look	Glittering Smack - Knockrour Favourite	2	4-1	29.70	Tom 'Paddy' Reilly (Walthamstow)
6th	Baytown Caddie	Bah's Choice - Baytown Blossom	4	8-1	29.74	Jack Harvey (Wembley)

=== Distances ===
½, 2¼, 2¼, 1¼, ½ (lengths)
The distances between the greyhounds are in finishing order and shown in lengths. From 1950 one length was equal to 0.08 of one second.

== Competition Report ==
Endless Gossip returned to defend his Derby title that he won in 1952 and was quoted 8-1 joint second ante-post favourite by the bookmakers for the event along with Pall Mall Stakes champion Marsh Harrier. The market leader at 7-1 was Ollys Pal. On the eve of the first round Marsh Harrier and another leading runner Bargain Hunter were both withdrawn lame. The first round brought some surprises, Dublin Darkie won at 20-1 and then a puppy called Daws Dancer beat Endless Gossip, but the latter still progressed and remained favourite for the competition. Ollys Pal encountered a large amount of trouble but impressed by still qualifying.

The second round resulted with many favourites being eliminated. A four way battle between Glittering Look, Small Town, Daws Dancer and Endless Gossip ended with a photo finish that showed Daws Dancer holding on for third place by a short head from the defending champion. Polonius claimed the heat that saw the elimination of Ollys Pal, whilst Galtee Cleo had posted 28.76 in the same round and was installed as the new favourite.

Glittering Look won the first semi-final holding off the challenge of Daws Dancer and Small Town but Galtee Cleo remained the favourite after winning the second semi-final to remain unbeaten in the competition.

The draw for the final (which did not carry seeding*) resulted in the wide running Galtee Cleo drawing trap one. Daws Dancer a 10-1 shot, had made it through to the final with two third place finishes and made a good break in the decider leading Galtee Cleo to the first bend; Galtee Cleo swung wide as expected and was baulked and also interfered with others including Glittering Look who was going well at this stage. Galtee Cleo recovered well but could not make up the ground lost to Daws Dancer.

Note* Seeding (the allocation of greyhounds and trap numbers based on their running style)

== See also ==
1953 UK & Ireland Greyhound Racing Year
