= Charlton Stadium =

Former greyhound racing venue in London

- Interactive map of Charlton Stadium
- Location: Charlton, London
- Coordinates: 51°29′19.442″N 0°1′44.061″E

Construction
- Opened: 1930
- Closed: 1971

Tenant
- Greyhound racing

Charlton Stadium was a greyhound racing stadium in Charlton, London.

== Origins ==
An amusement contractor (someone that had dealings with circus acts) called Thomas Murphy built Charlton Stadium south of the Thames on the Woolwich Road, just east of Gallions Road.

The first meeting took place on Saturday 20 July 1930.

=== Thomas Murphy ===
There is a record of an extraordinary event concerning Murphy and his 13-member Jazz Monkey band. The band escaped in 1926 after thieves let them loose and the 13 monkeys made their way from Latimer Road causing havoc at Latimer Road Underground station and many other parts of London, one even made it to Rugby.

Thomas Murphy died on 8 March 1932 aged 39 leaving his estate and the stadium to his benefactors. His memorial in Charlton cemetery features two life-sized statues of sleeping greyhounds.

== History ==
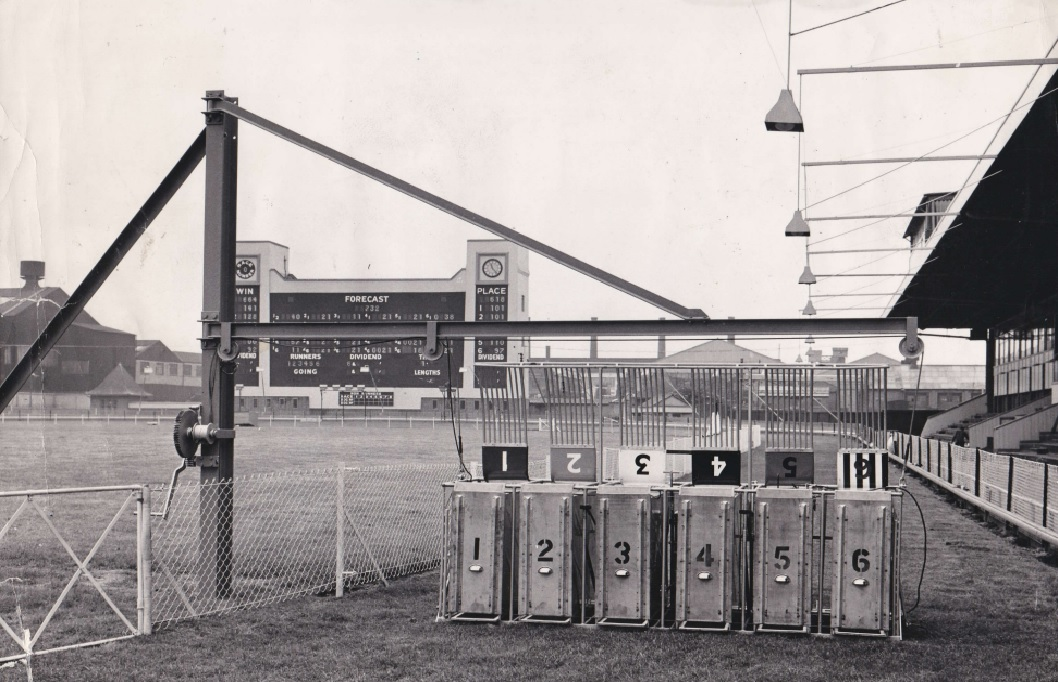
The starting traps at Charlton Greyhound Stadium c.1960

Following Murphy's death the shareholders of 'The Charlton Stadium Company Ltd' met and the company was liquidated and wound up in 1936 and then taken over by 'The Charlton Stadium (1936) Ltd'. Under new ownership, the stadium was completely rebuilt. The racing circuit was 361 yards in circumference with short straights favouring sprinters and not galloping types. New ventures such as boxing bouts were organised as the company traded up until the start of World War II. During wartime, racing was severely interrupted but business was booming by the end of the war. Totalisator turnover was in excess of £1 million every year after the war. These represent phenomenal figures based on historic inflation.

During the war the greyhound Ballynennan Moon won the Charlton Spring Cup in 1943; at the time this was Charlton's second biggest event behind the Cloth of Gold which had begun in 1941 over the distance of 600 yards. On 5 June 1946 Charlton Stadium (1936) Ltd was acquired by London Stadiums Ltd, which also acquired Wandsworth Stadium Ltd and Park Royal Stadium Ltd. The three companies received shares in London Stadiums Ltd.

The first Charlton hound to claim glory on the open race front was Satin Beauty trained by Durant who won the Coronation Stakes at Wembley in 1942. Black Coffee won the Circuit at Walthamstow Stadium in 1949.

In the 1950s, London Stadiums Ltd appointed Mr R E C Parkes as Director of Racing to oversee their three tracks and the Racing Manager was Mr A Lambert. In 1959 Charles Boulton replaced Lambert before the track closed in September 1961 following difficulties. The Cloth of Gold was switched to sister track Wandsworth. In 1963 Frank Sanderson headed a group of greyhound owners who made an offer to purchase the stadium from London Stadiums Ltd. The closure lasted four years before the company opened up again for racing again in 1966.

Wandsworth closed in 1966 resulting in Mr K A Guy (Director of Racing) and Boulton (Racing Manager) taking up the same positions at Charlton. Doug Allison was appointed Assistant Racing Manager. Also arriving from Wandsworth were two major events, the Olympic and the Cloth of Gold, the latter was Charlton's own original race. Racing was on Tuesday and Fridays evenings at 7.45pm and trials were held on Wednesdays at 11.30am. The trainers at the track after reopening were Bill Cowell, J Hourigan, P. O’Shaughnessy, G Holyhead and Miss B Nattriss, most were ex-Wandsworth trainers.

Two more big events the Greenwich Cup and Ben Truman Stakes were held at Charlton following the demise of New Cross Stadium in 1969 and the final London Stadiums Ltd track Park Royal closed its doors the same year blaming the opening of betting shops for the outcome.

=== Sunbury Kennels ===
All three stadia, Wandsworth, Park Royal and Charlton Stadium were served by the Sunbury Kennels, which were located in a rural setting on Hanworth Road in Sunbury-on-Thames twelve miles from Park Royal Stadium. The kennels which were built in 1933 at the cost of £25,000 sat in fourteen acres and had accommodation for 600 greyhounds. In addition to the kennels there was a veterinary surgery including X-ray, Ultraviolet and Infrared ray apparatus, with the kennel staff and veterinary surgeon living on site. The self-contained exercising grounds included over three quarters of a mile of special track for road work. The establishment had its own kitchens, bakery and isolation kennels (for sickness). One of the early kennel managers was Mr Cadwallader who organised 12 trainers (4 per stadium), each with their own stadium related section. Total staff numbered 80 and the kennels were seen as the equivalent for London Stadiums Ltd that the Hook Estate and Kennels was for the Greyhound Racing Association.

== Closure ==
In 1967 the Greyhound Racing Association (GRA) purchased Clapton Stadium and Slough Stadium, and then added Charlton to their portfolio. GRA had a child company, the GRA Property Trust, officially intended to improve the value of its property portfolio. The GRA duly sold Charlton stadium. On 19 March 1974 Makro opened its fifth UK store on the site. The last race meeting was on 28 September 1971.

== Competitions ==
=== Cloth of Gold ===
Year	Winner	Breeding	Trainer	Time (sec)	SP	Ref
1941	Victory Welcomed	Border Mutton – Worsted Wayward	J Noonan (Private)	34.56	7/2	
1943	Jubilee Time	Fine Jubilee – Winning Time	Leslie Reynolds (Wembley)	23.62	1/3f	
1945	Another Farewell		Dal Hawkesley (West Ham)	35.14	1/2f	
1946	Mondays News	Orlucks Best – Monday Next	Fred Farey (Private)	35.10	4-/7f	
1947	Kilrid Hero		Tom Johnston Sr. (West Ham)	35.28	7/2	
1948	Young Pretender	Chieftain - Blackstreets	R H Clark (Private)	35.22	100/8	
1949	Captain Lake	Captain Brown – Banna Lake	Jack Harvey (Wembley)	35.64	3/1	
1950	Coolafin		Sidney Orton (Wimbledon)	36.10	7/1	
1951	Push Hard	D.X.Rice – Just Push	J E Scott (Charlton)	35.15	7/2	
1952	Dublin Darkie		Paddy McEvoy (Private)	34.63	1/3f	
1953	Kilcurry Ranger		Jack Toseland (Perry Barr)	34.86	5/1	
1954	Prince Chancer	Fire Prince – Palm Swell	Jimmy Jowett (Clapton)	34.35	4/7f	
1955	Pancho Villa	Mad Birthday - Golden Withins	Jack Harvey (Wembley)	34.86	3/1	
1956	Come To Mama		J Taylor (Private)	35.22	6/1	
1957	Kilcaskin Kern	Magourna Reject - Pavona	Tony Dennis (Private)	34.74	3/1	
1958	Kilcaskin Kern	Magourna Reject - Pavona	Tony Dennis (Private)	35.13	1/1f	
1959	Coolkill Racket	Collkill Nigger- Tennis Racket	Reg Holland (Private)	34.41	7/4	
1960	Noonans Rhapsody	Ballymac Ball – Vahsel Bay	Jimmy Jowett (Clapton)	34.46	5/1	
1961	Golden Arrow II	Solar Prince – Nepey Lass	Bob Burls (Wembley)	34.76		
1962	Daytona Kid	Racing Man – Silver Kid	Tom Johnston Sr. (West Ham)	38.93		
1963	Music Guest	Solar Prince – The Grand Duchess	Tom Johnston Jr. (West Ham)	38.72		
1964	Poor Linda	Hi There – Kilcomney Queen	George Waterman (Wimbledon)	38.08	11/4	
1965	Clifden Orbit	The Grand Prince – Pink View	Tom Johnston Jr. (West Ham)	37.85		
1966	Cons Duke	Crazy Parachute – Cons Diet	Lionel Maxen (Hackney)	34.63		
1967	Cheek To Cheek	Hi Con - Benison	Paddy Keane (Clapton)	36.12		
1968	Quiet Cheer	Golden Cheers – Vals Pet	Joe Booth (Private)	34.70		

(1941-61 Charlton 600 yards), (1962-65 Wandsworth 650 yards), (1966-68 Charlton 600 yards)

== Track records ==
Distance yards	Greyhound	Time	Date
415	Jubilee Time	23.46	4 September 1943
415	Balliantrim		September 1957
415	Mighty Midget		4 June 1959
415	Carry On Oregon	23.36	1970
600	Victory Welcome	34.56	22 May 1941
600	Crazy Paving	34.34	25 July 1959
775	My Bang Bang		26 July 1966
775	Mothel Duchess	45.93	1970
880	Mothel Duchess	52.69	1970
379 H	Neds Bay	24.22	19 August 1966
415 H	Still Moving	24.70	26 September 1941
415 H	Halfpenny King	24.20	1970
600 H	Brindle Regatta	35.58	30 July 1960
