= Metropolitan Cup =

Metropolitan Cup may refer to:

- Ron Massey Cup, semi-professional rugby league competition in Australia
- Metropolitan Cup (Leinster Rugby), a rugby union competition in Ireland
- Metropolitan Cup, a former greyhound racing competition held Clapton Stadium in England
