= St Leger (English greyhound race) =

British greyhound racing competition

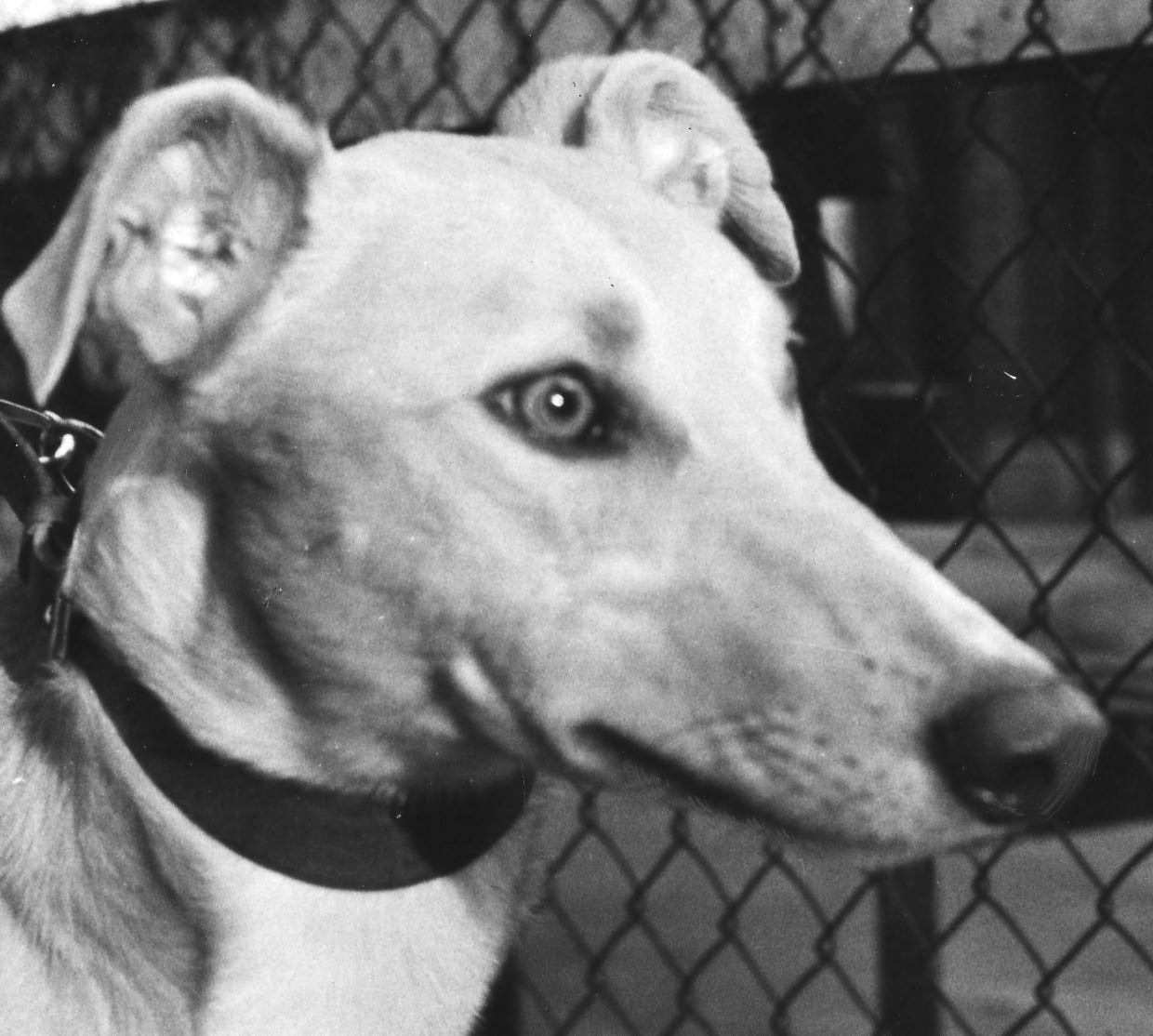
- 1977 champion Stormy Spirit
- Class: Original classic - Category 1
- Location: Nottingham Stadium
- Inaugurated: 1928
- Sponsor: Premier Greyhound Racing

Race information
- Distance: 730 metres
- Surface: Sand
- Purse: £20,000 (winner)

The St Leger is an original classic greyhound competition.

== Venues and distances ==
- 1927–1974 (Wembley Stadium, 700 y)
- 1975–1998 (Wembley Stadium, 655 m)
- 1999–2002 (Wimbledon Stadium, 660 m)
- 2003–2009 (Wimbledon Stadium, 698 m)
- 2010–2016 (Wimbledon Stadium, 687 m)
- 2017–2024 (Perry Barr Stadium, 710 m)
- 2025–2025 (Nottingham Stadium, 730m)

== Sponsors ==
- 1994–1994 (Wendy Fair)
- 2005–2017 (William Hill)
- 2018–2018 (GRA)
- 2019–2020 (Racing Post Greyhound TV)
- 2021–2021 (Arena Racing Company)
- 2022–2025 (Premier Greyhound Racing)

== History ==
It was run at Wembley Stadium from 1928 until 1998 but when the Wembley Greyhounds ended it moved to Wimbledon Stadium in 1999. The race is considered to be the premier stayers (between 500 and 700 metres) competition in greyhound racing.

The competition came to an end at Wimbledon after the 2016 running before being switched to GRA sister track Perry Barr. The prize money has reduced in recent times due to financial issues in 2010 and the loss of a Sky TV contract more recently. However, Premier Greyhound Racing doubled the winner's prize money to £20,000 in 2022.

The competition will be run at Nottingham Stadium in 2025.

== Past winners ==
Year	Winner	Breeding	Trainer	Time (sec)	SP	Notes/ref
1928	Burletta	Jock's Lodge - Fasten Fast	Alf Mulliner (Wembley)	41.91	5/2	
1929	Loughnagare	Loafer - Hands Off	Paddy McEllistrim (Wimbledon)	42.76	4/9f	
1930	Maiden's Boy	Guiding Hand - Maiden Hymn	Samuel Young (Private)	41.48	4/9f	
1931	Mick The Miller	Glorious Event - Na Boc Lei	Sidney Orton (Wimbledon)	41.31	1/1f	
1932	Fret Not	Lenin - Laughing Lady	Leslie Reynolds (White City)	41.35	7/2	
1933	The Daw	Service Kit - Crazy Margaret	Sidney Probert (Wembley)	41.24	6/4f	
1934	Bosham	Hertford - White Cap	Leslie Reynolds (White City)	41.17	13/8	
1935	Satans Baby	Blower - Golden Valley	Les Parry (White City)	40.95	10/11f	
1936	Ataxy	Inler - Gosha Bead	Leslie Reynolds (White City)	40.39	6/4	
1937	Grosvenor Bob	Golden Hammer - Wonderful Expression	Jim Syder Sr. (Wembley)	41.13	1/2f	
1938	Gretas Rosary	Mick the Miller - Greta Ranee	Eddie Wright (Harringay)	40.82	7/4jf	
1939	Gayhunter	Dans Leg - Trianon Lass	Eddie Wright (Harringay)	41.79	7/4	
1945	Robeen Printer	Dans Leg - DeocDeireannach	George McKay (Coventry)	40.03	2/5f	
1946	Bohernagraga Boy	Tact - Crony	Jim Syder Jr. (Wembley)	39.92	1/1f	
1947	Dante II	Well Squared - Olives Idol	Bob Burls (Wembley)	39.70	2/9f	
1948	Streets After Midnight	Street Rebel - Midnight Biddy	Les Parry (White City)	40.40	5/2	
1949	Lovely Rio	Fish Hill - Rio Czarina	Jack Harvey (Wembley)	40.77	7/1	
1950	Fawn Mack	Yankee Mack - Light Buzzer	George Curtis (Park Royal)	40.56	11/10f	
1951	Black Mire	Darkies Gift - Kelton Flash	Jack Toseland (Perry Barr)	40.19	2/1	
1952	Funny Worker	Funny Mick - Monas Lamb	Bob Burls (Wembley)	40.50	6/1	
1953	Magourna Reject	Astras Son - Saucy Dame	Tom 'Paddy' Reilly (Walthamstow)	39.88	7/4f	
1954	Pancho Villa	Mad Birthday - Golden Withins	Jack Harvey (Wembley)	40.99	1/1f	
1955	Title Role	Celtic Chef - Coolkill Darkie	Jack Harvey (Wembley)	40.78	4/1	
1956	Jakfigaralt	The Grand Champion - Prairie Vixen	Joe Booth (Private)	40.50	7/2	
1957	Duke of Alva	Ballymac Ball - Marchioness Minnie	Dicky Myles (Coventry)	39.97	4/6f	
1958	Barrys Prince	Champion Prince - Ballyglass Again	Jack Harvey (Wembley)	40.01	4/1	
1959	Wincot Clifford	Fly Prince - Whoosh	Jack Toseland (Perry Barr)	40.25	5/4f	
1960	Jungle Man	Man of Pleasure - Seafield Biddy	Harry Tasker (Private)	40.08	2/1	
1961	Clonalvy Pride	Solar Prince - Asmena	Jack Harvey (Wembley)	39.64	4/7f	
1962	Powerstown Prospect	Hi There - Faoide	Ronnie Melville (Harringay)	40.02	8/1	
1963	Friendly Lass	Hi There - Sallys Gossip	Tony Dennis (Private)	40.15	2/1	
1964	Lucky Hi There	Hi There - Olives Bonny	Jimmy Jowett (Clapton)	39.90	1/2f	
1965	Greenane Flash	Prairie Flash - Greenane Item	Jimmy Quinn (Perry Barr)	40.13	2/1	
1966	Summer Guest	Chieftains Guest - Summer Lady	Wilf France (Harringay)	40.03	11/8f	
1967	O'Haras Rebel	Odd Venture - Pure Hand	Bob Burls (Wembley)	39.54	6/1	
1968	Forward King	Crazy Parachute - Supreme Witch	Ted Brennan (Owlerton)	39.98	9/4	
1969	Crefogue Dancer	Printers Present - Crefogue	Bob Burls (Wembley)	39.65	8/1	
1970	Spotted Rory	Shanes Legacy - Dainty Flash	Paddy McEllistrim (Wimbledon)	40.28	2/1f	
1971	Dolores Rocket	Newdown Heather - Come on Dolores	Herbert White (Private)	40.03	1/2f	
1972	Ramdeen Stuart	Sallys Story - Any Streak	Norman Oliver (Brough Park)	39.82	2/1	
1973	Case Money	Booked Out - Jamboree Judy	Ted Parker (Harringay)	39.89	6/4jf	
1974	Cute Caddie	Red Barrel - Fellside Tiny	David Kinchett (White City)	41.17	4/1	
1975	Tartan Khan	Spectre - Chilled Sweet	Gwen Lynds (Bletchley)	39.45	7/2	Track Record
1976	Westmead Champ	Westmead County - Hacksaw	Pam Heasman (Hackney)	39.90	9/4	
1977	Stormy Spirit	Spectre - Nora Again	Joe Pickering (White City)	40.22	10/1	
1978	Westmead Power	Westmead County - Westmead Damson	Natalie Savva (Coventry)	39.67	4/5f	
1979	Kilmagoura Mist	Yanka Boy - Kilmagoura Fair	Tom Johnston Jr. (Wembley)	40.04	9/2	
1980	Fair Reward	Flip Your Top - Modest Style	Bob Young (Private)	40.46	5/2	
1981	Fox Watch	Ritas Choice - Queen of Moray	Jill Holt (Private)	40.17	5/2jf	
1982	Huberts Shade	Luminous Lad - Huberts Fate	Adam Jackson (Wembley)	39.83	13/2	
1983	Easy and Slow	Sand Man - Lucky Arrival	Adam Jackson (Wembley)	40.37	5/2	
1984	Gizzajob	Knockrour Bank - Move 'n' Groove	John Coleman (Romford)	40.28	33/1	
1985	Jet Circle	Jet Control - Kielduff Fun	Ted Dickson (Wembley)	40.14	11/4	
1986	Lone Wolf	Yankee Express - Breeze Valley	George Curtis (Brighton)	39.99	9/2	
1987	Life Policy	Lindas Champion - Lucky Friend	Bob Young (Brighton)	39.96	12/-1	
1988	Exile Energy	Gambling Fever - Princess Nora	Gary Baggs (Walthamstow)	39.76	9/2	
1989	Manx Marajax	Easy And Slow - Darian Ivy	Nigel Saunders (Belle Vue)	39.87	33/1	
1990	Match Point	Tico - Cuddles Sandy	Terry Kibble (Bristol)	39.92	7/1	
1991	Temps Perdu	Coolmona Man - Miss Tico	Albert Hill (Private)	40.18	9/4jf	
1992	Airmount Flash	Mr John Dee - Airmount Mary	Jimmy Gibson (Belle Vue)	39.81	3/1	
1993	Galleydown Boy	Flashy Sir - Annies Last	John Copplestone (Reading)	40.06	13/2	
1994	Ballarue Minx	Greenpark Fox - Ballarue Suzy	Bill Masters (Hove)	39.65	7/2	
1995	Kens Dilemma	Murlens Slippy - Daisys Spirit	Theo Mentzis (Rye House)	39.80	2/1f	
1996	Spring Rose	Galtymore Lad - Rachels Baby	Charlie Lister OBE (Nottingham)	39.29	2/5f	
1997	Tralee Crazy	Ratify - Dennys Daisy	Nick Savva (Walthamstow)	39.41	4/1	
1998	Droopys Pacino	Phantom Flash - Droopys Fergie	Tony Bullen (Private)	39.67	4/1	
1999	Dilemmas Lad	Frightful Flash - Kens Dilemma	Nick Savva (Milton Keynes)	40.56	5/1	
2000	Palace Issue	Deerpark Jim - Clear Issue	Linda Mullins (Walthamstow)	40.74	1/2f	
2001	Frisby Folly	Toms the Best - Frisby Fanfare	Harry Crapper (Sheffield)	40.74	3/1	
2002	Alibuk Lad	Toms The Best - Glencoe Star	Dilys Steels (Private)	40.95	10/1	
2003	Bite the Bullet	Bonus Prince - Hit the Dollar	Wayne Brunt (Private)	41.38	20/1	
2004	Roxholme Girl	Pacific Mile – Gilded Choice	Hayley Keightley (Private)	41.32	3-/1	
2005	Greenacre Lin	Top Honcho – First To Return	Brian Clemenson (Hove)	41.16	7/4f	
2006	Ninja Blue	Roanokee – Ballycummer Jil	Charlie Lister OBE (Private)	41.52	11/4	
2007	Spiridon Louis	Droopys Vieri – Early Flight	Lorraine Sams (Crayford)	40.86	4/1	
2008	Bubbly Totti	World Class – Droopys Seville	Ted Soppitt (Private)	41.06	1/4f	
2009	Kinda Easy	Just The Best – Kinda Sleepy	Mark Wallis (Harlow)	40.57	2/1jf	
2010	Droopys Bradley	Droopys Kewell – Droopys Mo	Paul Donovan (Wimbledon)	41.48	1/2f	
2011	Aero Majestic	Hondo Black – Rough Illusion	Mark Wallis (Yarmouth)	41.62	11/4	
2012	Blonde Reagan	Hometown Boy Nga – Swift Babe	Mark Wallis (Yarmouth)	41.87	5/2f	
2013	Farloe Tango	Hondo Black – Farloe Oyster	Charlie Lister OBE (Private)	41.40	5/4f	Track Record
2014	Roxholme Dream	Timor Blue – Lemon Blossom	Hayley Keightley (Swindon)	41.68	7/4f	
2015	Fizzypop Buddy	Tubbertelly Dubh – Saleen Queen	June Harvey (Wimbledon)	41.49	9/2	
2016	Ferryforth Fran	College Causeway - Diegos Lady	Mark Wallis (Towcester)	41.90	20/1	
2017	Rubys Rascal	Razldazl George – Swift Eva	Mark Wallis (Towcester)	42.99	3/1	
2018	Calico Ranger	Holdem Spy – Wont Fall Behind	Carol Weatherall (Henlow)	43.09	9/4	
2019	Redzer Ardfert	Paradise Madison – Have You One	Brendan Maunsell (Ireland)	43.12	5/4f	
2020	Smallmead	Definate Opinion – Ballymac Razl	John Mullins (Yarmouth)	43.37	10/1	
2021	Space Jet	Droopys Jet – Volcano	Matt Dartnall (Central Park)	42.59	10/3	Track record
2022	Havana Lover	Laughil Blake – Love Honey	Liz McNair (Private)	43.10	11/10f	
2023	Droopys Clue	Out Of Range ASB – Droopys Natalia	Seamus Cahill (Hove)	42.33	4/9f	Track record
2024	Droopys Clue	Out Of Range ASB – Droopys Natalia	Seamus Cahill (Hove)	42.97	2/5f	
2025	Mongys Wild	Roxholme Olaf – Banter Breeze	Mark Wallis (Private)	43.85	5/6f	
