= 1966 English Greyhound Derby =

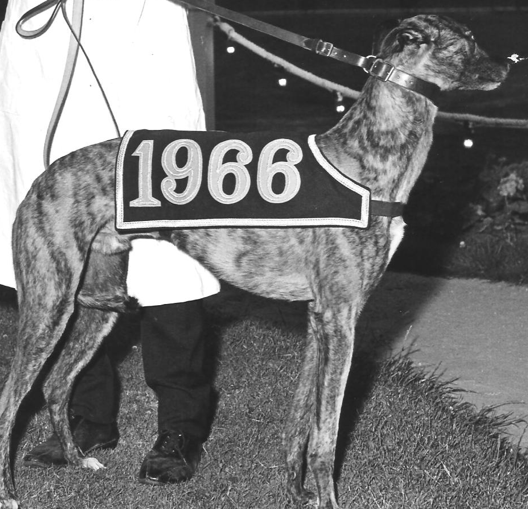
- Faithful Hope
- Location: White City Stadium
- Start date: 11 June
- End date: 25 June
- Total prize money: £7,728 (winner)

The 1966 Greyhound Derby took place during June with the final being held on 25 June 1966 at White City Stadium. The winner was Faithful Hope and the winning owners Miss Pauline Wallis and Sir Robert Adeane received £7,728.

== Final result ==
At White City (over 525 yards):

Position	Name of Greyhound	Breeding	Trap	SP	Time	Trainer
1st	Faithful Hope	Solar Prince - Millie Hawthorn	3	8-1	28.52	Paddy Keane (Clapton)
2nd	Greenane Flash	Prairie Flash - Greenane Item	6	4-1	28.84	Jimmy Quinn (Perry Barr)
3rd	Dusty Trail	Printer's Present - Dolores Daughter	5	6-1	28.90	Paddy Milligan (Private)
4th	I'm Quickest	Skips Choice - Gratton Star	1	5-2	29.26	Randy Singleton (White City - London)
5th	Maryville Hi	Knock Hill Chieftain - Hi Hook	4	13-8f	29.38	Paddy Coughlan (Private)
6th	Kilbeg Kuda	Knockrour Again - Bermuda's Glory	2	4-1	29.74	John Bassett (Private)

=== Distances ===
4¼, 1, 4¾, 1¾, 4¾ (lengths)
The distances between the greyhounds are in finishing order and shown in lengths. From 1950 one length was equal to 0.08 of one second.

== Competition Report ==
The Derby prize money had been boosted to a £7,728 first prize. Prince of Roses trained by Jim Irving was top of the ante-post lists and Sir Thomas Houstoun-Boswell purchased Irish flyer 'Maryville Hi' for the sum of £3,000 from Tony Murphy determined to have a Derby winner.

In the first round Prince of Roses went out and Maryville Hi only just qualified after finishing third after trouble. McAlevey Gold Cup winner Dillies Pigalle trained by Ronnie Chandler recorded 28.50 sec in a first round victory, just one length outside the track record of his father Pigalle Wonder.

Heat four in round two drew no less than five of the big names remaining in the competition together. Maryville Hi ran on to catch Kilbeg Kuda as they filled the top two spaces and Tell Nobody was third meaning Dillies Pigalle was eliminated. Dillies Pigalle went on to win the Derby consolation on final night.

Before the semi-finals Maryville Hi switched trainers; Houstoun-Bowswell had always planned for his trainer Paddy Coughlan to take over from Tony Murphy as soon as the National Greyhound Racing Club (NGRC) rules allowed it. Maryville Hi won his semi in 28.63 and Kilbeg Kuda took the second semi in 28.89, a superb feat because Rugby based vet Paddy Sweeney had saved his life after an accident in March.

In the final outsider Faithful Hope surprised many when from an awkward trap draw he broke well and stayed in contention with early leader Dusty Trail. Faithful Hope was a strong finisher and finding himself in a prominent position so early meant that he gained the lead by the second bend and ran out an easy winner in a very fast 28.52 sec. Maryville Hi under-performed and finished in fifth place.

== See also ==
- 1966 UK & Ireland Greyhound Racing Year
