= 1966 UK & Ireland Greyhound Racing Year =

The 1966 UK & Ireland Greyhound Racing Year was the 41st year of greyhound racing in the United Kingdom and the 40th year of greyhound racing in Ireland.

== Roll of honour ==
Major Winners
Award	Name of Winner
1966 English Greyhound Derby	Faithful Hope
1966 Irish Greyhound Derby	Always Proud
1966 Scottish Greyhound Derby	Dusty Trail
1966 Welsh Greyhound Derby	I'm Quickest
Greyhound of the Year	Dusty Trail
Greyhound Trainer of the Year	Paddy Milligan
Irish Greyhound of the Year	Hairdresser

== Summary ==
The industry celebrated its 40th anniversary but the event was marred by the government extended betting tax to all greyhound tracks and attendances suffered because of the 1966 World Cup. Wembley however refused to cancel regular greyhound racing resulting in the World Cup match between Uruguay and France being played at White City Stadium.

Dusty Trail is voted Greyhound of the Year after winning the Scottish Greyhound Derby, Select Stakes, International at Wimbledon and Anglo Irish International at White City, in addition to finishing runner-up in the Welsh Derby and reaching the Laurels final.

== Competitions ==
The racing schedule suffered bad organisation, with the Welsh Greyhound Derby, Oaks and Scurry Gold Cup all clashing in July and the Scottish Greyhound Derby and St Leger clashing in September. The Regency at Brighton & Hove Greyhound Stadium changed status from a produce race for British Bred greyhounds to an open competition for all-comers.

Halfpenny King nearly won the triple crown of jumping; after winning the English Grand National and Scottish Grand National he headed for Arms Park but finished second.

== Tracks ==
After eighteen years of attempting to gain a licence to run under National Greyhound Racing Club rules without success the Cradley Heath track were finally given a licence. The management led by Fred Jeffcott (the breeder of Fine Jubilee) and Racing Manager Lionel Clemmow started NGRC racing for the first time in September. Charlton Stadium re-opened, it had closed in 1962 and it took possession of the Olympic and Cloth of Gold from Wandsworth Stadium which closed.

Slough Stadium was purchased by the Greyhound Racing Association (GRA) and the Clapton Stadium shareholders contemplated a bid from GRA which included two training sites with 180 acres and an interest in the West Ham Stadium site. The deal goes ahead later in the year but there were concerns regarding the fact that the GRA policy was now buying and selling property sites. Both Horsley Hill in South Shields and Gateshead closed.

Wisbech Greyhound Stadium owner Herbert Barrett purchased independent track King's Lynn Stadium and introduced greyhound racing there.

== News ==
The Greyhound Express received a phone call from an Irishman asking if the reward for missing Juvenile winner Hi Joe was still on offer (he had been stolen the previous year). His trainer Noreen Collin contacted owner Victor Chandler and he said that it had been reduced from £2,000 to £1,000. The man called again and a meeting was arranged in the Three Greyhounds pub in Soho, where it was agreed that the reward would be paid through a lawyer but the police had been alerted and Detective Peter Jarrott tracked the case to a wooden garage in Dunstable and Hi Joe was found with some pups. The garage belonged to Bartholomew Casey and he had raced Hi Joe on the Bletchley flapping track under the name of Super Black. The culprit was caught and sent to court, but were released due to a bizarre ancient law stating that if a stolen dog goes missing for more than six months you cannot be charged with theft. However Casey was charged with stealing the dog's coat.

== Ireland ==
Val's Prince gained revenge on Always Proud during the Guinness 600, winning by three lengths from his rival. Always Proud had defeated Val's Prince in the final of the Irish Greyhound Derby.

Clomoney Grand won two major events by taking the Easter Cup and Callanan Cup.

Ballybunion opened for racing on 18 May.

== Principal UK races ==
Grand National, White City (23 April: 525y h, £500)
Pos	Name of Greyhound	Trainer	SP	Time	Trap
1st	Halfpenny King	John Shevlin	7-2	30.28	5
2nd	Husky Breeze	John Bassett	6-4f	30.38	1
3rd	Lough Chief	J.Ramsden	4-1	30.44	2
4th	Feakles Wish	George Carrigill	12-1	30.45	3
5th	Greenane Star		12-1	30.65	4
6th	Westpark Beech	Phil Rees Sr.	4-1	30.75	6

BBC Sportsview TV Trophy, Walthamstow (28 April: 880y, £1,000)
Pos	Name of Greyhound	Trainer	SP	Time	Trap
1st	Bedford	Bob Thompson	20-1	52.46	4
2nd	Lucky Arrow II	Peter Collett	11-2	52.66	5
3rd	Sonora		14-1	52.69	1
4th	Greenane Flash	Jimmy Quinn	11-8f	52.85	6
5th	Breachs Blizzard	Judy Pattinson	13-2	52.97	2
6th	Miss Vanilla		5-2	53.09	3

Gold Collar, Catford (14 May: 570y, £1,500)
Pos	Name of Greyhound	Trainer	SP	Time	Trap
1st	Dark Symphony	Peter Collett	100-8	33.21	1
2nd	Scaragh Brae	John Bassett	15-8f	33.33	6
3rd	Major Triumph II	Adam Jackson	16-1	33.65	5
4th	Wonder Settler	John Bassett	3-1	34.13	4
5th	Shake the Key	Reg Webb	2-1	34.53	2
6th	Mimi II	Ivy Regan	12-1	34.65	3

The Grand Prix, Walthamstow (31 May: 500y, £500)
Pos	Name of Greyhound	Trainer	SP	Time	Trap
1st	Westpark Bison	Barney O'Connor	8-11f	40.14	5
2nd	Bousy	Jim Singleton	13-7	40.26	2
3rd	Park Nightingale		5-1	40.29	1
4th	Miss Taft	Bob Burls	12-1	40.69	6
5th	Kenler Dandy	Barney O'Connor	25-1	40.75	4
6th	Misery Me	Adam Jackson	6-1	40.91	3

Welsh Derby, Arms Park (2 July: 525y £500)
Pos	Name of Greyhound	Trainer	SP	Time	Trap
1st	I'm Quickest	Randy Singleton	3-1	29.59	1
2nd	Dusty Trail	Paddy Milligan	4-1	29.87	3
3rd	Double Rock	Paddy Milligan	12-1	30.47	5
4th	Harmony	Jim Irving	20-1	30.63	6
5th	Handsome Teddy	John Perrin	10-1	30.71	2
6th	Greenane Flash	Jimmy Quinn	1-1f	31.27	4

Oaks, Harringay (4 July: 525y, £1,000)
Pos	Name of Greyhound	Trainer	SP	Time	Trap
1st	Merry Emblem	Matt Bruton	7-4	29.58	6
2nd	Lucky Dawn	Nora Gleeson	11-2	29.61	5
3rd	Greek Lady	Jimmy Quinn	13-8f	29.64	2
4th	Marjone	Mick O'Toole	20-1	29.67	3
5th	Office Problem	Bill Kelly	10-1	29.77	1
6th	Rebeccas Pet	Eric Adkins	14-1	29.78	4

Scurry Gold Cup, Clapton (9 July: 400y £1,000)
Pos	Name of Greyhound	Trainer	SP	Time	Trap
1st	Geddys Blaze	Stan Gudgin	9-2	22.79	4
2nd	Near The Fire	Clare Orton	4-1	22.93	6
3rd	Gaultier King	Randy Singleton	7-1	23.13	5
4th	Beech Walk Rover	Adam Jackson	10-1	23.16	3
5th	Fallen Rock	John Coleman	9-2	23.26	2
6th	Stately Val	Brian Jay	13-8f	23.34	1

Laurels, Wimbledon (12 August: 500y, £1,500)
Pos	Name of Greyhound	Trainer	SP	Time	Trap
1st	Super Fame	Nora Gleeson	9-2	28.05	5
2nd	Handsome Teddy	John Perrin	7-1	28.07	2
3rd	Geddys Blaze	Stan Gudgin	8-1	28.29	3
4th	Dusty Trail	Paddy Milligan	11-10f	28.30	1
5th	Mr Model	Tom Reilly	10-1	28.48	6
6th	Alley Rose		40-1	28.50	4

Scottish Greyhound Derby, Carntyne (3 September: 525y, £1,000)
Pos	Name of Greyhound	Trainer	SP	Time	Trap
1st	Dusty Trail	Paddy Milligan	4-5f	28.59	1
2nd	Corville Gallant	Jimmy Quinn	3-1	28.87	3
3rd	Heckler	Bessie Lewis	8-1	29.43	4
4th	Im Quickest	Randy Singleton	6-1	29.67	5
5th	Bawn Heather	Harry Ward	12-1	29.68	2
6th	Lax Law	J.Doyle	8-1	30.08	6

St Leger, Wembley (5 September: 700y, £1,500)
Pos	Name of Greyhound	Trainer	SP	Time	Trap
1st	Summer Guest	Wilf France	11-8f	40.03	1
2nd	Peculiar Way	George Curtis	12-1	40.13	6
3rd	Bousy	Jim Singleton	10-1	40.25	2
4th	Breachs Blizzard	Judy Pattinson	7-2	40.39	3
5th	Handsome Teddy	John Perrin	9-4	40.47	4
6th	Rainbow Trout	John Brown	12-1	40.55	5

Cesarewitch, West Ham (7 October: 600y, £1,500)
Pos	Name of Greyhound	Trainer	SP	Time	Trap
1st	Rostown Victor	Tom Johnston Jr.	66-1	34.06	6
2nd	Corville Gallant	Jimmy Quinn	8-13f	34.10	4
3rd	Petes Regent	Bob Burls	11-4	34.16	1
4th	Bimco	Kevin O'Neill	25-1	34.56	5
5th	Greenane Squire		10-1	34.92	3
6th	Fast Buffalo		14-1	34.93	2

== Totalisator returns ==
Extended content

The totalisator returns declared to the licensing authorities for the year 1966 are listed below.

Stadium	Turnover £
London (White City)	5,710,047
London (Harringay)	3,769,431
London (Wimbledon)	3,577,943
London (Walthamstow)	3,021,339
London (Wembley)	2,571,368
London (Catford)	2,087,003
London (Clapton)	1,961,728
Manchester (Belle Vue)	1,885,789
London (West Ham)	1,870,596
London (Hendon)	1,402,975
London (New Cross)	1,400,474
Edinburgh (Powderhall)	1,313,721
Romford	1,313,372
Birmingham (Perry Barr, old)	1,259,139
London (Stamford Bridge)	1,249,301
Manchester (White City)	1,180,380
Brighton & Hove	1,113,400
London (Hackney)	1,069,414
Birmingham (Hall Green)	1,064,660

Stadium	Turnover £
Glasgow (Shawfield)	1,053,926
London (Park Royal)	958,985
Glasgow (White City)	894,246
Newcastle (Brough Park)	874,990
Wolverhampton (Monmore)	857,881
Slough	807,796
Leeds (Elland Road)	790,528
Sheffield (Owlerton)	763,417
Southend-on-Sea	727,345
Manchester (Salford)	723,707
Bristol (Eastville)	682,734
Newcastle (Gosforth)	662,458
Willenhall	662,304
Crayford & Bexleyheath	659,831
Birmingham (Kings Heath)	634,780
Gloucester & Cheltenham	614,884
Cardiff (Arms Park)	602,790
London (Charlton)	598,470
Liverpool (White City)	559,306

Stadium	Turnover £
Reading (Oxford Road)	552,145
Bradford (Greenfield)	542,376
Hull (Old Craven Park)	542,376
Ramsgate (Dumpton Park)	533,552
Glasgow (Carntyne)	472,316
Derby	466,274
Poole	435,382
Rochester & Chatham	402,941
Oxford	385,945
Middlesbrough	368,436
Nottingham (White City)	320,029
Portsmouth	317,176
Leicester (Blackbird Rd)	306,339
Preston	302,101
Aberdeen	278,233
Rayleigh (Essex)	200,829
Norwich (City)	185,395
