= 1951 English Greyhound Derby =

Greyhound racing event

- Location: White City Stadium
- Start date: 16 June
- End date: 30 June
- Total prize money: £1,500 (winner)

The 1951 Greyhound Derby took place during June with the final being held on 30 June 1951 at White City Stadium. The winner Ballylanigan Tanist received a first prize of £1,500.

== Final result ==
At White City (over 525 yards):

Position	Name of Greyhound	Breeding	Trap	SP	Time	Trainer
1st	Ballylanigan Tanist	Mad Tanist - Fly Dancer	1	11-4	28.62	Leslie Reynolds (Wembley)
2nd	Black Mire	Darkies Gift - Kelton Flash	3	9-4f	28.82	Jack Toseland (Perry Barr)
3rd	Rushton Smutty	Mad Tanist - Summer Frock	2	4-1	29.04	Frank Johnson (Private)
4th	Atomic Line	Astra's Son - Atomic Seal	6	4-1	29.20	Jack Harvey (Wembley)
5th	Rapid Choice	Bah's Choice - Pure Motive	4	100-8	29.26	Paddy McEvoy (Private)
6th	Mad Miller	Mad Tanist - Castletown Skinner	5	10-1	29.48	Leslie Reynolds (Wembley)

=== Distances ===
2½, 2¾, 2, ½, 2¾ (lengths)
The distances between the greyhounds are in finishing order and shown in lengths. From 1950 one length was equal to 0.08 of one second.

== Review ==
A record 140 entries were received at the initial stage of the 1951 English Greyhound Derby, which left the White City Racing Manager Major Percy Brown with the difficult task of selecting 48. Eight first round heats took place and Quare Customer, the Cesarewitch champion and 1950 English Greyhound Derby runner, quoted at 100-1 won his heat. Three other pre-competition 100-1 shots also sealed heat wins, they were Guineas champion Derryboy Blackbird, Junes Idol and Moon Again. Ante post favourite Black Mire and another market leader, Atomic Line both won their heats.

Junes Idol won again in round two, in the fastest time so far (28.66), beating a field including Black Mire. Three Wembley greyhounds, Greenwood Tanist and Ballylanigan Tanist trained by Leslie Reynolds and Atomic Line trained by Jack Harvey dominated the remaining three heats.

In the first semi-final Atomic Line held off the challenge of the Ballylanigan Tanist, with Rushton Smutty (1950 Trafalgar Cup and Puppy Derby champion) taking the third qualifying place. The second semi-final went to 5-4 on shot Black Mire, in a fast 28.62, with Mad Miller and Rapid Choice taking the final berths for the final.

On the final night a crowd of 62,000 witnessed Atomic Line breaking from the starting traps first but Rushton Smutty forced his way inside going to the first bend. Ballylanigan Tanist's early pace put him into the lead on the outside of the pair and then he stretched that lead on the back straight. By the third bend only Black Mire looked a danger to Ballylanigan Tanist after he overtook Rushton Smutty on the back straight to move into second place. However Ballylanigan Tanist remained two and a half lengths clear at the finish line, in a time of 28.62 seconds, a new record for the final. The winning owner was Norman Dupont and it was a third Derby title for trainer Leslie Reynolds.

== See also ==
- 1951 UK & Ireland Greyhound Racing Year
