= 1952 English Greyhound Derby =

- Location: White City Stadium
- Start date: 14 June
- End date: 28 June
- Total prize money: £1,500 (winner)

The 1952 Greyhound Derby took place during June with the final being held on 28 June 1952 at White City Stadium. The winning owner and breeder of Endless Gossip, Henry Ernest Gocher, received a first prize of £1,500. Trainer Leslie Reynolds won a fourth Derby, extending his record further.

== Final result ==
At White City (over 525 yards):

Position	Name of Greyhound	Breeding	Trap	SP	Time	Trainer
1st	Endless Gossip	Priceless Border - Narrogar Ann	6	1-1f	28.50	Leslie Reynolds (Wembley)
2nd	Drumman Rambler	Selyom - Shaggy Miss	2	7-2	28.78	Olly Chetland (Coventry)
3rd	Shaggy Newshound	Mondays News - Shaggy Lizzie	1	25-1	29.02	Bert Heyes (White City - London)
4th	Dashboard Dan	Mad Tanist - Carrigshane Choice	5	7-1	29.22	Jack Toseland (Perry Barr)
5th	Caseys Seal	Lone Seal - Counndee Girlie	4	100-8	29.46	Tom 'Paddy' Reilly (Walthamstow)
6th	Paddys Dinner	Paddy the Champion - Penny Dinner	6	9-2	00.00	Tom Smith (Clapton)

=== Distances ===
3½, 3, 2½, 3, DNF
The distances between the greyhounds are in finishing order and shown in lengths. From 1950 one length was equal to 0.08 of one second.

== Review ==
Trafalgar Cup champion Magourna Reject, owned by Mrs Frances Chandler and trained by Noreen Collin was the ante post favourite for the 1952 Derby, the blue brindle and white dog had never been out of the first three in his career to date. Three times Derby winning trainer Leslie Reynolds was represented by the defending champion Ballylanigan Tanist and a newcomer called Endless Gossip. Black Mire reappearing after injury was another fancied to do well.

Endless Gossip recorded 28.52 seconds, in winning by ten lengths and recording a sectional split of 15.94, the first ever greyhound to break 16 seconds. Ballylanigan Tanist also won in a fast time of 28.61 and Black Mire progressed after recovering from a recent injury but there was a shock elimination when Magourna Reject ran poorly.

The second round drew two of the big names together, the Reynolds pair of Ballylanigan Tanist and Endless Gossip, the former broke well but was badly baulked by Murex of Munster ending his chances to qualify, Endless Gossip missed the break but avoided the trouble and went on to win in 28.70.

Grand National finalist Drumman Rambler had been switched back to the flat after racing over hurdles and had performed well by getting through each round and he won the first semi-final, Paddys Dinner and Shaggy Newshound confirmed their places in the final by finishing second and third in the race. The second semi-final provided a shock as Endless Gossip missed the break again and was badly impeded, only just qualifying in third place behind Dashboard Dan and Caseys Seal. He had finished well to catch Outcast Billy on the last bend.

Leading up to the final, two greyhounds Shaggy Newshound and Paddys Dinner were carrying injuries and battling against time to be fit for the decider. In the final Endless Gossip broke from the traps in third place behind Drumman Rambler and Shaggy Newshound but then took a commanding lead out of the second bend. He stayed in front to win comfortably in a new Derby record of 28.50 seconds. Paddys Dinner felt his injury and pulled up lame.

== See also ==
1952 UK & Ireland Greyhound Racing Year
