= Endless Gossip =

Famous racing greyhound

- Sire: Priceless Border
- Dam: Narrogar Ann
- Sex: Dog
- Whelped: March 1950
- Color: Brindle
- Owner: Henry Ernest Gocher
- Trainer: Leslie Reynolds

Record
- English Greyhound Derby; Welsh Greyhound Derby; Select Stakes; All England Cup; Champion Stakes; Wembley Summer Cup

Awards
- Derby champion

Endless Gossip was a racing greyhound during the 1950s. He won the 1952 English Greyhound Derby.

== Early life ==
He was bred by Henry Ernest Gocher, a retired cattle breeder. The choice of sire and dam was determined by Gocher's belief that greyhounds could be bred using the same genetic theories he had used for many years in raising prize beef cattle. He purchased the 1949 English Greyhound Derby champion Narrogar Ann and mated her to the 1948 English Greyhound Derby champion with the idea that this would result in a champion litter. The litter was whelped in March 1950 and they were given names with the initials EG after his own name. Both the sire and dam had been trained by Leslie Reynolds, which was also his chosen trainer for his pick of the new litter.

== Racing career ==
One of the first targets for Endless Gossip was the 1952 English Greyhound Derby and he caused a sensation during the first round when winning in 28.52 seconds by ten lengths and recording a sectional time of 15.94, the first ever greyhound to break 16 seconds for a split time. He went on to win the Derby which culminated in the final on 28 June.

Just one week later he won the Welsh Greyhound Derby at Cardiff Arms Park and was denied the chance to win the Triple Crown when the Scottish Greyhound Derby was cancelled. The fine form continued during the season when he then won the Laurels at Wimbledon Stadium.

In 1953 he was the first Derby champion to compete in the Waterloo Cup coursing event, which was rare for a champion track racing greyhound before he headed back to White City to defend his Derby title. The campaign finished at the second round stage before he made a second Welsh Derby final. He finished his career with wins in the Select Stakes, at Wembley beating his great rival, Magourna Reject and the Wimbledon Champion Stakes, which he again won from Magourna Reject. This brought his winnings to more than £5,000. He later won a prize in the show ring at Crufts and was sold to Miss Joan Hunt, an American breeder, in Miami and was put to stud.

== Pedigree ==
Ruby Border
Clonahard Border
Gil's Selected
Priceless Border
White Sandills
Pricless Sandills
Paris Cutlet
Endless Gossip
Mellow Outlook
Dutton Swordfish
Dutton Oak
Narrogar Ann
Beef Cutlet
Winne of Berrow
Jubilee Joan
