= Belle Vue Park (Stockton-on-Tees) =

Former stadium in Stockton-on-Tees, UK

- Location: Norton Road, Stockton-on-Tees, County Durham
- Coordinates: 54°34′41″N 1°18′22″W
- Opened: 1946
- Closed: 1974

Belle Vue Park (Stockton-on-Tees) was a greyhound racing stadium located on Norton Road, Stockton-on-Tees, County Durham. It is not to be confused with Belle Vue Stadium in Manchester.

== Origins ==
The stadium was constructed on Belle Vue Gardens, Mount Pleaseant in 1946. The stadium was located on the east side of Norton Road.

== Greyhound racing ==
The greyhound racing started on 1 June 1946 and continued right up to 1970 and possibly beyond. The racing was independent (not affiliated to the sports governing body the National Greyhound Racing Club). Described as a rugged flapper the main distance was 440 yards and an inside Sumner hare was used. The directors of the company were Charles Hutchinson (Chairman), Joe Pye, George Hindmarsh and Stan White.

== Closure ==
The site which was on the south side of Mount Pleasant Road and north of the Lustrum Beck closed around 1974 and was redeveloped as housing called Belle Vue Court.
