= Spennymoor Greyhound Stadium =

Former stadium in England

- Location: Spennymoor, County Durham
- Coordinates: 54°41′47″N 1°35′35″W
- Opened: 1950
- Closed: 1998

Spennymoor Greyhound Stadium was a greyhound racing stadium in Spennymoor, County Durham.

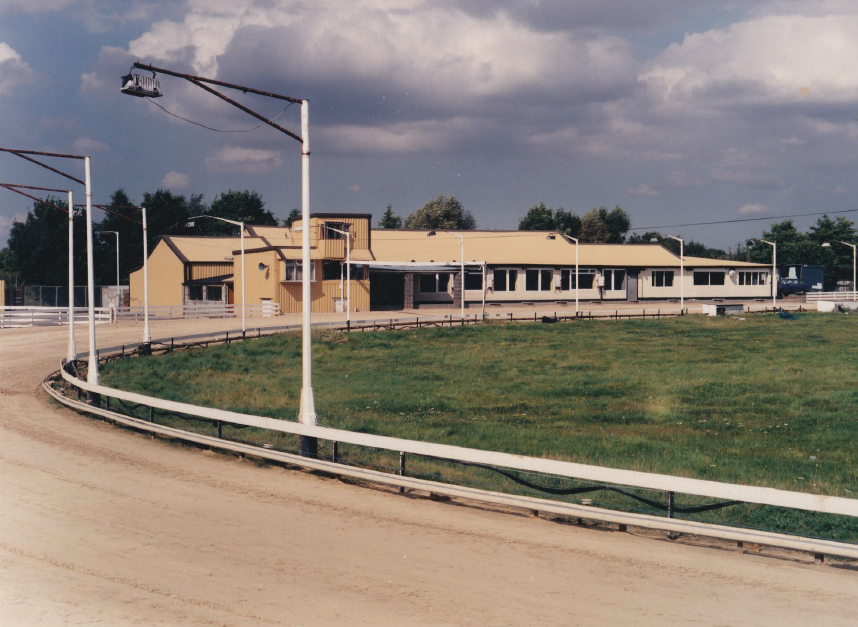
Spennymoor Greyhound Stadium c.1980

== Origins ==
Spennymoor gained its name from being a large area of moorland covered with thorn bushes and was founded around 1850. During 1938 the White City (Newcastle) company that owned the White City Stadium in Newcastle at Scotswood Bridge unsuccessfully attempted to introduce racing in the town. After the war a site for a new greyhound track was proposed in the coal mining town in an area near the Binchester Colliery Railway. The old brick works off Merrington Lane near Low Spennymoor was chosen and a greyhound track was constructed on the west side of the lane to provide entertainment for the local population including many of the coal miners who lived nearby.

== Opening ==
Spennymoor began greyhound racing as an independent track (unaffiliated to a governing body). The opening meeting was held on 30 June 1950.

== Independent Years ==
During the 1960s the independent track used an 'Inside Sumner' hare system and had race distances of 300, 500 and 700 yards, race day was Monday at 7pm and there was a licensed club for patrons and 60 kennels for the greyhounds.

By 1980 there were additional race nights on Thursday and Saturday evenings and there were six bookmakers in attendance with trials held on a Sunday. The immediate area had changed significantly over the years with a very large Merrington Lane Industrial Estate constructed to the south-east and the smaller Coulson Industrial Estate to the north replacing the old miners housing.

Changes also took place at the stadium with a development company owning it at one stage before Neville Porter purchased it in 1991. The track introduced the Northern Derby and trainers such as Ted Soppitt frequented the venue under Porter before the track came under the control of Paul Stephenson.

== NGRC ==
The stadium holds the post war record for the shortest spell as an affiliated track from spring 1997 until January 1998. Paul Stephenson had attempted to join the National Greyhound Racing Club (NGRC) under the permit scheme before applying for a full licence. The licence was eventually granted and Spennymoor started trialling under rules before racing under the NGRC banner for the first time in June 1997. The main distances of 270 and 460 metres were mainly handicap races and Sunday racing was inaugurated.

== Closure ==
The racing only lasted until 30 January 1998 when the stadium closed. After closing the site began to become unkept and a fire burned down anything of value at a later date. The area was cleaned up and bought by Woodford Land a development company who gained permission for 200 homes before selling to Dunelm Castle Homes and Homes by Woodford. The only reminder of the stadium is the nearby public house that has stood for 100 years and changed its name to the 'Winning Post'.

== Track records ==
Distance metres	Greyhound	Time	Date
460	Boyne Border	27.64	19.10.1997
460	Pond Saturn	27.83	28.10.1997
630	Kokkini Hani	40.64	29.06.1997
