= Magourna Reject =

Racing greyhound

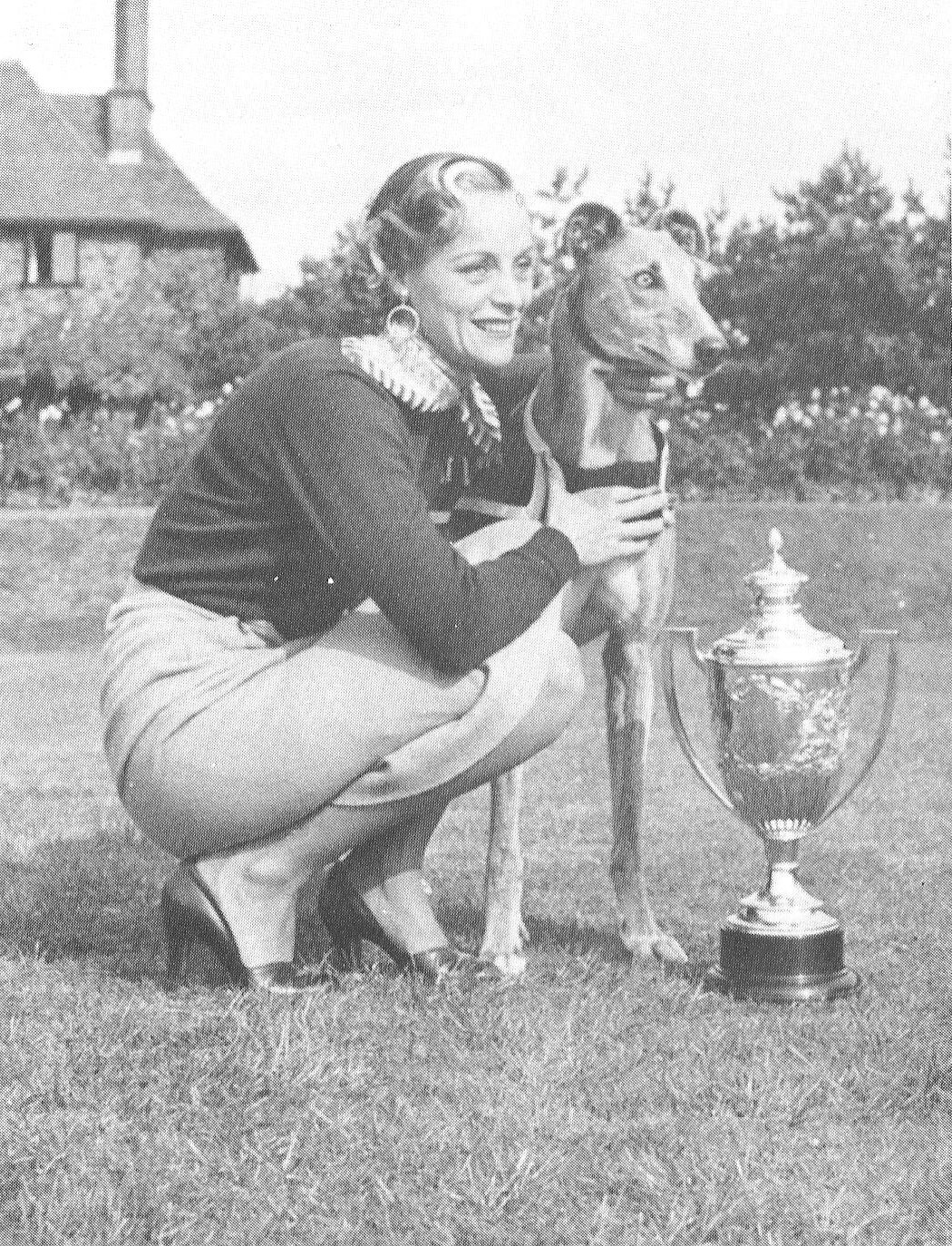
- Magourna Reject in 1954
- Sire: Astra's Son
- Dam: Saucy Dame
- Sex: Dog
- Whelped: March 1950
- Died: 1962
- Color: Blue Brindle and white
- Breeder: John Murphy
- Owner: Mrs Frances Chandler
- Trainer: Tom Reilly, Noreen Collin

Record
- St Leger; Cesarewitch; Trafalgar Cup; Wood Lane Stakes; Stewards Cup; Key

Other awards
- 1953 Greyhound of the Year

Magourna Reject was a racing greyhound during the 1950s. He won two classic races and was one of the leading greyhounds of the decade.

== Early life ==
He was bred by John Murphy in Coachford and whelped in March 1950. He gained his racing name aged just 3 months after he was given to an Irish girl as an engagement present, but when the engagement ended he was returned to his breeder. He was then bought by Mrs Frances Chandler, the wife of William Chandler for £150.

== Racing career ==
Magourna Reject was trained by Noreen Collin at Walthamstow Stadium and was based at Collin's kennels in High Warren, Theydon Manor, in Epping.

After winning the 1951 Trafalgar Cup, a major competition for puppies, he was described as the fastest ever puppy. He subsequently went into the 1952 English Greyhound Derby as the ante-post favourite. However, he disappointed and was eliminated during the first round, and his great rival Endless Gossip went on to win the competition. Magourna Reject then reached the Welsh Greyhound Derby final but once again lost to Endless Gossip.

He then stepped up in distance to the longer trip of 700 yards and became a crowd favourite with his running style and exceptional pace. However, he ended the year without winning a classic race after failing to win both the St Leger and Cesarewitch when priced odds-on during both finals.

In the early part of 1953, he came under the training of Tom "Paddy" Reilly because Collin had relinquished her post at the Walthamstow kennels and was replaced by Reilly. Despite a second failed attempt at the English greyhound Derby, Magourna Reject won the Key at Wimbledon, the Stewards' Cup at Gloucester (setting a track record) and the Wood Lane Stakes at White City during 1953, but it was the two classic wins which sealed his place in an elite group of greyhounds.

In the St Leger at Wembley on 14 September, 30,000 people watched the final, a race that was also seen by several million on television (the first televised classic race). His supporters were rewarded as he easily won by five lengths. He then defeated his rivals in the Cesarewitch final on 16 October, winning by three and a half lengths from the Oaks champion, Lizette, his time of 33.24 seconds being the fastest ever for the event at West Ham Stadium.

He was voted Greyhound of the Year by a press panel on behalf of the British Greyhound Breeders and Owners Association.

== Retirement ==
Magourna Reject was retired to stud, demanding 35 guineas for a mating. He died in 1962.

== Pedigree ==
Castledown Lad
Paddy the Champion
Brilliant Gay
Astra's Son
Tanist
Astra
Mad Darkie
Magourna Reject
Ammon Carb
Ballymakeera Gift
Old Capwell
Saucy Dame
Tiro
Another Dame
Dame of the House
