= Clapton Stadium =

Former sports ground in London, England

- Millfields Road
- Interactive map of Clapton Stadium
- Location: Clapton, London, England
- Coordinates: 51.5582°N 0.0435°W
- Surface: Grass
- Record attendance: 37,615 (football)

Construction
- Renovated: 1927–28
- Closed: 1974

Tenants
- Clapton Orient (1896–1930); Greyhound racing (1928–1974)

The Clapton Stadium, also known as Millfields Road, was a football ground and greyhound racing stadium in the Lower Clapton area of London.

== History ==
The stadium was originally named Whittles Athletic Ground and was mostly used for whippet racing. It was built on top of an old fireworks manufactory on the north side of Millfields Road.

=== Football ===
In 1896 Clapton Orient moved to the site from Pond Land Bridge, after which it became known as Millfields Road. The football club began redeveloping the stadium, with large embankments built around the pitch using slag from an adjacent power station.

Clapton Orient were elected to the Second Division of the Football League in 1905, and the first Football League was played at the ground on 9 September 1905, with Orient beating Hull City 1–0 in front of 3,000 spectators. In 1906 the first covered spectator facility was provided, when a 2,000-seat grandstand was built. This stand was sold to Wimbledon to use at their Plough Lane ground in 1923, and was replaced by a 3,000-seat stand.

Orient set their record League attendance at the ground on 16 March 1929 when 37,615 saw them lose 3–2 to Tottenham Hotspur. However, the club were in financial trouble at the end of the 1920s and were forced to leave the ground, moving to the Lea Bridge Stadium. Their last match at the ground was a 4–1 win over Brighton on 3 May 1930 with 8,763 in attendance.

=== Greyhound racing ===
==== Pre-World War II ====
In 1927 the Clapton Stadium Syndicate became joint tenants, and major alterations were made to the ground to allow for greyhound racing, costing over £80,000. An oval track was installed around the football pitch, with covered concrete terracing laid on the three sides away from the main stand. The new layout was designed by Owen Williams, and the ground became London's fourth greyhound track, staging its first meeting on 7 April 1928.

In 1928 the track hosted a new race over 400 yards that gained classic status called the Scurry Gold Cup. In 1930 the stadium opened its first restaurant and the stands were renovated becoming covered stands. The first managing director was H.Garland Wells, who was joint vice president of the National Greyhound Racing Society and the company were called Clapton Stadium Ltd and also owned Reading, and later South Shields and Warrington. Clapton was described as a small difficult course with short straights (76 yards) and easy bends on a circumference of 359 yards with the hare system being a 'Centre Scott Magee Silent'. The nearby training quarters at Claverhambury Farm in Waltham Abbey had two hundred acres of grassland in rural surroundings with six resident trainers and six ranges of kennels with each range having a five-acre plot for exercising.

In 1934 the track was represented in the 1934 English Greyhound Derby final by Wild Woolley locally trained by Harry Woolner and Joe Coral (Gala Coral Group) was a bookmaker at the track before his Empire grew. A second Derby final appearance by arrived in the 1938 English Greyhound Derby after Demotic Mack finished fifth for trainer Charles Cross. The same greyhound then emulated the feat one year later finishing third this time.

In 1939 the greyhound track underwent improvements and a second restaurant was built.

==== Post-war ====
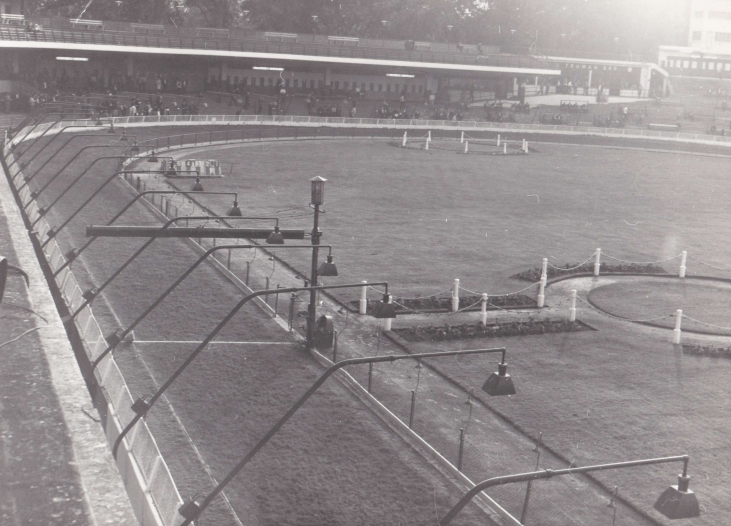
Clapton Greyhound Stadium c.1960

The stadium closed for short periods during the war but was still able to race at other times. The appointment of trainer Stan Biss was a success, he trained greyhounds called Local Interprize and Rimmells Black. Local Interprize a black dog went onto win the Welsh Greyhound Derby, the Gold Collar twice, the Cesarewitch, Scurry Gold Cup and reached the English Derby final twice. Garland-Wells died in 1948 and the stadium established notable events called the Metropolitan Cup, National Sprint, London Cup & National Open Hurdles.

In 1952 Clapton appointed trainer Jimmy Jowett from Warrington and there was another Derby final appearance with the Tom Smith trained Paddys Dinner. In 1953 the director of racing was Eric Godfrey, and the racing manager was Mr H. J. Richardson, and the six resident trainers were John Snowball, Arch Whitcher, Clare Orton, Jimmy Jowett, Gordon Nicholson and Tom Smith. Also in 1953 a new lighting system was installed.

The stadium won its first Derby crown in 1956 after the Paddy McEvoy-trained Dunmore King prevailed, and five years later Palms Printer won the Derby, claiming a second win for Paddy McEvoy. Dromin Glory was voted 1962 Greyhound of the year, and a third Derby title in 1963 went to the John Bassett-trained Lucky Boy Boy. The Claverhambury Farm, in Waltham Cross, produced six Derby winners between 1956 and 1972; they were Dunmore King, Palms Printer, Lucy Boy Boy, Chittering Clapton, Faithful Hope and Patricias Hope.

During 1963 Clapton Stadiums Ltd scrapped evening starting times in an attempt to stop the bookmaker shops from being able to take advantage of their off-course betting following the introduction of the Betting and Gaming Act 1960, and in the same year the track hosted Pinewood Studios as they shot scenes for a new film starring Rita Tushingham and Mike Sarne called Bethnal Green.

The company sold Slough Stadium to the Greyhound Racing Association (GRA) in 1966 and the Clapton shareholders contemplated a bid from GRA which included Clapton Stadium, two training sites with 180 acres and an interest in the West Ham site. The deal went ahead later that year. Clapton was the first track to install a closed-circuit television race patrol camera in 1967 that was able to replay the races to the public.

The GRA and in particular the GRA Property Trust were actively selling prime areas of land to developers and there was uncertainty surrounding the track and it was dealt a blow when in 1968 all of the greyhounds were relocated to the Northaw Kennels from the Clapton kennels at Claverhambury Farm. Despite the sale of the kennels trainers Adam Jackson and Paddy Keane both secured Derby wins with Chittering Clapton and Faithful Hope respectively. A sixth Derby crown was won by the track when a greyhound with superstar status called Patricias Hope won 1972 English Greyhound Derby.

==== Closure ====
In 1969 the GRA sold the track to what was effectively a redevelopment company. The sale of the popular track caused much upset regardless of the fact that there were no immediate plans for closing. On 1 January 1974 the stadium closed and was later demolished making way for the Millfields housing estate in the early 1980s.

=== Other uses ===
In the early 1930s the stadium was used as a major venue for boxing and also used for baseball.

== Greyhound racing competitions ==
=== Metropolitan Cup ===
Year	Winner	Trainer	Time (sec)	SP	Notes/ref
1928	Black Dot	Robert Linney (Clapton)	35.37		
1929	Harry Hawker	Griffin (Clapton)	34.40		
1930	Bewitching Eve	R Cooper (Clapton)	33.82		
1931	Damaris	Paddy Quigley (West Ham)	33.47		
1932	Waltz Chain	Arthur Doc Callanan (Wembley)	33.12		
1933	Leap Year Rover	PJ Higgins (Clapton)	33.57		
1934	Master Sam	Garretty (Private)	32.85		
1935	Shed Labourer	Dal Hawkesley (Catford)	32.43		
1936	Final Record	Stanley Biss (West Ham)	32.83		
1937	Kemp	Harry Woolner (Catford)	32.83	4/1	
1938	Islingham Prince	Johnny Bullock (Catford)	32.71	100/8	
1939	Noble Man Junior (dead-heat)	Jimmy Jowett (Private)	32.79	5/2	
1939	On The Strait (dead-heat)	Miss B Byles (Private)	32.79	10/1	
1940	Congleton Tiger (dead-heat)	Arch Whitcher (Clapton)	22.70	9/2	
1940	Trev's Transport (dead-heat)	Johnny Bullock (West Ham)	22.70	7/2	
1941	Rochester Clipper	Miss Olive Motchman (Park Royal)	32.74	100/7	
1942	Jamboree Reveller	Charlie Ashley Harringay)	32.70	7/2	
1943	Ballynennan Moon	Sidney Orton (Wimbledon)	32.41	10/11f	
1944	Midnight Parade	Sidney Orton (Wimbledon)	32.94	3/1	
1945	Ferry Dancer	Paddy McEllistrim (Wimbledon)	32.75	100/7	
1946	Trev's Fashion	Fred Trevillion (Private)	32.57	5/2	
1947	Lovely Auburn	Stanley Biss (Clapton)	32.90	5/4f	
1948	Northam Star	Leslie Reynolds (Wembley)	32.56	6/4f	
1949	Kilbelin Iris	Stanley Biss (Clapton)	32.49	5/1	
1950	April Song	S Tanner (Private)	33.01	10/1	
1951	Aerial Mail	Bob Burls (Wembley)	32.63	5/2	
1952	Kind Comrade	Noreen Collin (Walthamstow)	32.73	2/1	
1953	Rolling Mike	Jimmy Jowett (Clapton)	32.18	4/6f	
1954	Daring Friendship	Arch Whitcher (Clapton)	32.47	8/1	
1955	The Grand Champagne	Jack Harvey (Wembley)	32.15	9/2	
1956	Glenriver	Jimmy Jowett (Clapton)	32.35	2/1f	
1957	Kays Imperial	Jimmy Jowett (Clapton)	32.04	5/4f	
1958	Nons Bing	W Brown (Private)	32.52	5/2	
1959	Glittering Copper	Jimmy Jowett (Clapton)	32.18	9/4	
1960	Rockfield Flash (dead-heat)	Frank Sanderson (Private)	33.53	13/2	
1960	Noonans Rhapsody (dead-heat)	Jimmy Jowett (Clapton)	33.53	4/1	
1961	Utellme	Clare Orton (Wimbledon)	33.19		
1962	Walk Right	Jimmy Jowett (Clapton)	33.65		
1965	Geddys Empress	Bill Kelly (Clapton)	33.17		
1966	Rebeccas Pet (dead-heat)	Eric Adkins (Private)	33.55		
1966	Scaragh Walsh (dead-heat)	John Bassett (Private)	33.55		
1967	Larrys Charm	Bill Kelly (Clapton)	33.30		
1968	Winning Hope	Paddy Keane (Clapton)	33.21		
1969	Shanes Concord	Arthur Hancock (Brighton)	33.54	10/1	
1970	Camira Prince	Jimmy Jowett (Clapton)	33.58		

=== London Cup ===
Year	Winner	Trainer	Time (sec)
1930	Dark Midnight	Foster (Clapton)	33.26
1931	Smart Fashion	Paddy McEllistrim (Wimbledon)	33.46
1932	Luvetts Double	Albert Bedford (Catford)	33.03
1933	Queen of the Suir	Stanley Biss (West Ham)	32.78
1934	Lynton II	Arthur Doc Callanan (Wembley)	32.66
1935	Border Mutton	Paddy McEllistrim (Wimbledon)	32.48
1936	Westley Bridge	Jack Harvey Harringay)	32.53
1937	Demotic Mack	Charles Cross (Clapton)	32.61
1938	Royal Devil	Les Parry (White City)	32.57
1939	Jill Of Waterhall	Leslie Reynolds (Wembley)	32.69
1941	Rahinskey Champion	Paddy Fortune (Wimbledon)	32.43
1942	Victory Welcomed	Jack Sherry (Catford)	32.69
1943	Ballykildare	Sidney Orton (Wimbledon)	32.40
1944	Blackwater Cutlet	Paddy Fortune (Wimbledon)	32.43
1945	Another Farewell	Dal Hawkesley (West Ham)	32.34
1946	Netties Ranger	Charles Cross (Clapton)	33.70
1947	Monarone	Stanley Biss (Clapton)	33.05
1948	Cleofilius	Stanley Biss (Clapton)	32.55
1949	Jubilee Olive	Leslie Reynolds (Wembley)	23.30
1950	Denver Air	Stanley Biss (Private)	23.40
1951	Swanee Beg	Norman Merchant (Private)	23.40
1952	Hectic Birthday	Ronnie Melville (Wembley)	22.96
1953	Snow White Brown	Henry Parsons (Crayford)	22.93

=== National Open Hurdles ===
Year	Winner	Trainer	Time
1928	Rather Cheerful	Parsons Harringay)	37.36
1929	More Serap	Parsons Harringay)	34.79
1930	Fleeting Fashion	Stan Martin (Private)	34.84
1931	Glean A Cruim	R Cooper (Clapton)	34.64
1932	Avonvale	Charles Cross (Clapton)	34.29
1933	Scallywag II	Claude Champion (Wimbledon)	34.09
1934	Scallywag II	Claude Champion (Catford)	33.61
1935	Tubberona Prince	Les Parry (White City)	33.42
1936	Master Flyer	Jerry Hannafin (Wimbledon)	33.84
1937	Carstown Boy	Leslie Reynolds (White City)	34.06
1938	Juvenile Classic	Joe Harmon (Wimbledon)	33.07
1939	Juvenile Classic	Joe Harmon (Wimbledon)	33.63
1948	Wild Wave	Dave Barker (Catford)	33.77
1949	Ross Abbey	Clare Orton (Coventry)	33.19
1950	Sprightly Peter	Paddy McEllistrim (Wimbledon)	33.13
1951	Sprightly Peter	Paddy McEllistrim (Wimbledon)	33.27
1952	Castleknock Seal	Jerry Hannafin (Wimbledon)	32.99
1953	Spanish Rosetree	Jerry Hannafin (Wimbledon)	32.89

=== Orient Cup ===
Year	Winner	Trainer	Time
1946	King Silver	Crowley (Clapton)	23.82
1948	Greenane Pine	Stanley Biss (Clapton)	24.39
1949	Keepers Serenade	Archie Whitcher (Clapton)	23.77
1950	Jackies Gift	Boswell (Clapton)	23.37
1951	Kilcoman Rover	Paddy McEllistrim (Wimbledon)	24.06
1952	Pluckanes Bell	Paddy Mullins (Portsmouth)	23.45
1953	Rolling Mike	Jimmy Jowett (Clapton)	23.65

=== Track records ===
Yards	Greyhound	Time (sec)	Date	Notes/ref
400	Creamery Border	23.31	5 August 1933	Scurry Gold Cup Final & National record
400	Jack's Joke	23.15	3 August 1935	Scurry Gold Cup final
400	Return Fare II	22.89	July 1939	
400	Rimmells Black	23.11	26 July 1947	Scurry Gold Cup Final
400	Minorca's Hope	22.82	1953	
400	Rolling Mike	22.77	25 July 1953	Scurry Gold Cup Final
400	Gorey Airways	22.48	23 July 1960	Scurry Gold Cup Final
400	Cranog Bet	22.41	11 July 1964	
400	Foyle Tonic	22.37	July 1968	Scurry Gold Cup heats
400	Don't Gambol	22.29	8 July 1971	
550	Wild Woolley		February 1934	World record
550	Blackwater Cutlet		31 August 1944	
550	Rolling Mike	31.99	15 August 1953	
550	Prince Chancer	31.76	23 September 1954	
575	Kilcarbery Pride	32.85	1963	
575	Geddys Empress	32.82	7 June 1965	
575	Sues Fancy	32.67	1 June 1967	
575	Yellow Printer	=32.67	13 July 1968	
760	Poetic Boy	45.29	1950	
760	Priceless Spot	44.60	3 October 1953	
760	Lucky Hi There	43.88	25 June 1964	
909	Carmen Star	53.80	25 June 1964	
934	St Pancras Sharon	55.75	23 July 1960	
934	Movealong Margo	55.20	13 July 1968	
400H	Mount Davis	24.08	1950	
400H	Ruddy Caution	23.53	8 August 1953	
400H	Change That	23.08	6 August 1960	
503H	Fodda Champion	32.55	23 March 1957	
550H	Macaroni II	33.02	1950	
550H	Abbots End Monk	32.68	4 July 1953	
550H	Change That	32.41	20 August 1960	
575H	Prince Lawrence	34.67	11 November 1954	
