= Leslie Reynolds =

British greyhound racing professional trainer

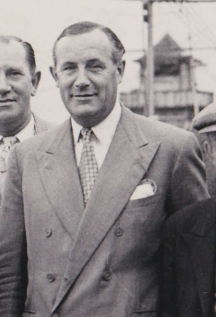
- Leslie Reynolds pictured in 1955

Personal information
- Born: 9 April 1906 Oare, Wiltshire, EnglandBattersea
- Died: 1 August 1961 (aged 55) Battersea, England
- Occupation: Greyhound trainer

Sport
- Sport: Greyhound racing

Achievements and titles
- National finals: Derby wins: English Derby (1948, 1949, 1951, 1952, 1954); Welsh Derby (1951, 1952); Classic/Feature wins: Cesarewitch (1936, 1950); St Leger (1932, 1934, 1936); Laurels (1946, 1951, 1952); Grand Prix (1945 1946); Scurry Gold Cup (1949); Gold Collar (1934); Pall Mall Stakes (1945); TV Trophy (1958, 1959)

Leslie Reynolds (9 April 1906 – 1 August 1961) was a leading English greyhound trainer. He was a five times winner of the English Greyhound Derby which constituted a record until beaten by Charlie Lister in 2011.

== Biography ==
Reynolds was born during 1906 in Oare, Wiltshire. He was the 'slipper' at the Waterloo Cup meetings and took up an appointment at Harringay Stadium in the late 1920s.

Reynolds achieved his first classic success in 1932 when he won the St Leger at Wembley with a greyhound called Fret Not, a finalist in the 1932 English Greyhound Derby. He switched his trainer's attachment from Harringay to White City, London, during 1934.

Before the war he had won a Cesarewitch, a Gold Collar and two more St Legers but his success was interrupted with the postponement of almost all racing in London for the duration of the war. He was forced to seek an attachment at Wembley because of the continued closure of White City.

After racing resumed he won a Pall Mall Stakes, two Grand Prixs and a Laurels before securing the ultimate prize: in 1948 Priceless Border won the English Greyhound Derby.

He remained at Wembley and proceeded to win four more English Greyhound Derby competitions in 1949 with Narrogar Ann, 1951 with Ballylanigan Tanist, 1952 with Endless Gossip and 1954 with Pauls Fun. This constituted a record that was held for 57 years.

Reynolds died on 1 August 1961 in Battersea, aged 55, on the same day as his wife's birthday.
