= 1949 UK & Ireland Greyhound Racing Year =

The 1949 UK & Ireland Greyhound Racing Year was the 24th year of greyhound racing in the United Kingdom and the 23rd year of greyhound racing in Ireland.

== Roll of honour ==
Major Winners
Award	Name of Winner
1949 English Greyhound Derby	Narrogar Ann
1949 Irish Greyhound Derby	Spanish Lad
1949 Scottish Greyhound Derby	not held
1949 Welsh Greyhound Derby	not held

== Summary ==
The annual totalisator turnover was a healthy £85,643,207, which although the fifth highest ever recorded was also the third consecutive drop since 1946.

Another concern was that there were 207 tracks operating which was 63 less than during 1934. The industry put the blame squarely on government legislation that continued to squeeze operating profits. The government however were under pressure from organisations such as the Committee of Churches and ordered a public session. They presented evidence to the Royal Commission of Betting Lotteries and Gaming attacking all forms of betting with greyhound racing being singled out in particular, with mention of all under 18s being banned from tracks and the deduction from the totalisator to be brought down from its current percentage with no gain for promoters through the operations of the bookmakers. The session resulted in a full blown disagreement.

Narrogar Ann became only the second bitch to win the English Greyhound Derby which was also the second success in three years for the British breeders.

== Tracks ==
Employment at National Greyhound Racing Club tracks was 4,140 permanent employees and 14,809 part-time.

=== Tracks opened ===
Date	Stadium/Track	Location
15 October	Parkneuk Sports Stadium	Motherwell
1 December	West Suffolk Greyhound Stadium	Bury St Edmunds

== Competitions ==
Local Interprize continued his success by winning a second consecutive Gold Collar title. The Wimbledon Two Year Old Produce Stakes offered a first prize of £900 for the 36 runner event. It was won on 22 June by Huntlawrigg, trained by Jerry Hannafin. The schedule of big races took a major hit as both the Welsh Greyhound Derby and Scottish Greyhound Derby were cancelled following problems over insufficient entries and funding. Local Interprize once again ran well in the Scurry Gold Cup but got beaten by a short head in the final to Burndennet Brook.

Trainer Stan Martin claimed the first two places with Ballymac Ball and Magna Hasty in the Laurels. Ballymac Ball won his heat beating Eastern Madness by three lengths and setting a new fast time for the event which was also a track record at Wimbledon of 28.03 seconds. He improved this time in his semi-final with a time of 27.99 seconds, beating Trev's Jubilee by twelve lengths, with Local Interprize a further length behind. He was the first greyhound to break 28 seconds at Wimbledon for 500 yards and in the final won by two lengths from kennelmate Magna Hasty, he possessed the same speed as his half-brother Ballyhennessy Seal. Defending champion Good Worker finished fifth with his trainer the former Surrey cricketer Jack Daley relinquishing his licence to become a cricket coach.

Ballymac Ball next contested the Thames Silver Salver at Southend Stadium, winning his heat and semi-final but, in the final, was beaten three lengths by Red Wind in 27.78 seconds, a new track record. Red Wind went on to win the Grand Prix. Defending champion Rio Cepretta did well to make the Oaks final again, two years after her triumph, the race was won by Still Drifting. Trainer Frank Davis continued his fine run in the sport and winning a major double in the October events, Red Wind had won the Grand Prix from kennelmate Drumgoon Boy and then the latter made amends by becoming Cesarewitch champion from another kennelmate Quare Caltha. The year ended with Ballymac Ball setting another track record, on 10 December, at White City over 550 yards in a time of 30.30 seconds when beating Good Worker and Narrogar Ann and on Boxing Day he went even faster in a time of 30.27, beating Red Wind, Eastern Madness and Narrogar Ann again.

The Bob Burls trained Behattan Marquis ended the year as the leading open race winner after 14 victories. He earned £2,637 in prize money and won the Wood Lane Stakes, the Northern Flat, the Midland Flat, the Summer Cup and the Eclipse.

== News ==
Clapton Stadium appointed a new trainer called Sidney Clare Orton known as 'Clare', son of Sidney Orton, he had spent three years at Coventry. Fred Trevillion's put up his entire operation up for sale which consisted of his £150,000 estate including kennels for 100 greyhounds, a schooling track, farmhouse and forty acres. Trevillion would later return to the United States but later died there greatly disillusioned.

At greyhound racing's premier track (White City) three new sea-food bars attract more than 4,000 customers on race nights and the track employs 14 part time staff to cope with the demand. Wimbledon introduced a new photo finish system which is unveiled by Instaprint Ltd.

== Ireland ==
Tim 'Chubb' O’Connor bred a successful litter from a mating with his bitch Cordal Moonlight. He put her to Shaggy Lad and four of the litter Spanish Lad, Spanish Emperor, Spanish Treasure and Ardraw Moonlight excelled in coursing which prompted O'Connor to mate her again. This time it was to Rebel Abbey and resulted in a greyhound named Spanish Chestnut. Spanish Lad won the Irish Greyhound Derby and Spanish Chestnut caused a sensation when winning the Irish Laurels in early September, aged just 18 months beating Derby champion and older half-brother Spanish Lad into second place.

Ear-marking for litters is introduced and all Irish greyhounds must be named by ten months old.

== Principal UK races ==
Grand National, White City (May 21 525y h, £350)
Pos	Name of Greyhound	Trainer	SP	Time	Trap
1st	Blossom of Annagura	Jack Sherry	8-1	30.20	1
2nd	Dangerous Prince	Ken Appleton	5-4f	30.48	3
3rd	Ross Abbey	Clare Orton	100-80	30.68	2
4th	Appleford Peter		13-8	31.40	4
5th	Sprightly Peter	Paddy McEllistrim	7-1	00.00	5

Gold Collar, Catford (Jun 4, 440y, £600)
Pos	Name of Greyhound	Trainer	SP	Time	Trap
1st	Local Interprize	Stanley Biss	6-4f	25.88	1
2nd	Laughing Grenadier	Jack Harvey	8-1	26.24	2
3rd	Killure Laddie	Sidney Orton	8-1	26.36	4
4th	Trev's Dell	Fred Trevillion	6-1	26.46	3
5th	Buzzing Afterwards	Alf Turner	5-2	26.49	5
6th	Desert Aster		100-7	26.59	6

Scurry Gold Cup, Clapton (Jul 23, 400y £500)
Pos	Name of Greyhound	Trainer	SP	Time	Trap
1st	Burndennet Brook	Leslie Reynolds	5-2	23.48	1
2nd	Local Interprize	Stanley Biss	8-11f	23.49	6
3rd	Somers Powell	Charlie Ashley	25-1	23.81	3
4th	Gistra Barcus		100-7	23.93	4
5th	Magna Leader		8-1	24.01	5
6th	Billy Wigs		20-1	24.17	2

Laurels, Wimbledon (Aug 26, 500y, £600)
Pos	Name of Greyhound	Trainer	SP	Time	Trap
1st	Ballymac Ball	Stan Martin	4-5f	28.61	6
2nd	Magna Hasty	Stan Martin	100-8	28.75	5
3rd	Eastern Madness	Leslie Reynolds	5-2	28.78	2
4th	Trev's Jubilee	Fred Trevillion	66-1	28.88	1
5th	Good Worker	Jack Daley	6-1	29.02	4
6th	Flintfield Grosvenor	D Hayes	100-8	29.04	3

Oaks, White City (Sep 10, 525y, £550)
Pos	Name of Greyhound	Trainer	SP	Time	Trap
1st	Still Drifting	Sidney Probert	11-2	29.48	2
2nd	Baytown Stream	Stan Biss	11-2	29.50	4
3rd	Rio Cepretta	Stan Biss	11-2	29.62	5
4th	Fortbarrington Lady	Stan Biss	11-8f	29.66	6
5th	Lady Maud	Hardy Wright	9-2	29.76	1
N/R	Steps of Grace	Jerry Hannafin			3

St Leger, Wembley (Oct 1, 700y, £600)
Pos	Name of Greyhound	Trainer	SP	Time	Trap
1st	Lovely Rio	Jack Harvey	7-1	40.77	2
2nd	Rio Cavallero	Stan Biss	1-1f	40.81	5
3rd	Harvest King		8-1	41.05	1
4th	Baytown Stream	Stan Biss	5-1	41.15	3
5th	Fortbarrington Lady	Stan Biss	5-1	41.25	4
6th	Alvaston Muir	Stan Martin	10-1	41.37	6

The Grand Prix Walthamstow (Oct 8, 525y, £350)
Pos	Name of Greyhound	Trainer	SP	Time	Trap
1st	Red Wind	Frank Davis	10-11f	29.82	4
2nd	Drumgoon Boy	Frank Davis	5-4	29.98	1
3rd	Rio Cavallero	Stan Biss	9-1	30.78	3
4th	Devil O’Leer	Norman Merchant	66-1	31.12	2
5th	Doughery Boy	Jonathan Hopkins	66-1	32.40	6
6th	Quarter Seal		66-1	00.00	5

Cesarewitch, West Ham (Oct 21, 550y, £600)
Pos	Name of Greyhound	Trainer	SP	Time	Trap
1st	Drumgoon Boy	Frank Davis	4-9f	30.71	2
2nd	Quare Caltha	Frank Davis	7-1	30.91	5
3rd	Sailing at Dawn	Sidney Probert	9-2	31.13	3
4th	Captured Dick	Jack Harvey	66-1	31.29	6
5th	Saft Alex	Jack Toseland	40-1	31.41	4
6th	White Nigger	Frank Davis	100-1	31.49	1

== Totalisator Returns ==
Extended content

The totalisator returns declared to the licensing authorities for the year 1949 are listed below. Tracks that did not have a totalisator in operation are not listed.

Stadium	Turnover £
London (White City)	6,748,051
London (Harringay)	4,773,625
London (Wembley)	4,324,443
London (Wimbledon)	3,096,750
London (Walthamstow)	3,043,055
London (Stamford Bridge)	2,373,263
London (Wandsworth)	2,254,342
London (Catford)	2,249,197
London (Clapton)	2,241,426
London (Park Royal)	2,037,949
Manchester (Belle Vue)	1,970,808
London (West Ham)	1,829,569
London (New Cross)	1,650,623
London (Hackney)	1,560,901
London (Hendon)	1,494,735
Glasgow (Shawfield)	1,268,485
Brighton & Hove	1,230,895
Edinburgh (Powderhall)	1,159,608
London (Charlton)	1,084,287
Manchester (White City)	1,051,702
Birmingham (Perry Barr, old)	983,569
Romford	980,467
Newcastle (Brough Park)	938,724
Manchester (Salford)	912,843
Southend-on-Sea	906,222
Crayford & Bexleyheath	885,460
Birmingham (Hall Green)	863,769
Bristol (Eastville)	799,180
Wolverhampton (Monmore)	797,516
Sheffield (Owlerton)	795,355
Coventry (Lythalls Lane)	776,316
Blackpool (St Anne's)	761,907
Glasgow (White City)	757,184
Cardiff (Arms Park)	725,709
Bradford (Greenfield)	714,118
Liverpool (White City)	699,009
Sheffield (Darnall)	694,342
Southampton	679,752
Birmingham (Kings Heath)	666,060
Glasgow (Albion)	658,423
London (Dagenham)	658,364
Leicester (Blackbird Rd)	623,767
South Shields	619,304

Stadium	Turnover £
Glasgow (Carntyne)	597,017
Leeds (Elland Road)	593,690
Gateshead	575,008
Newcastle (Gosforth)	574,530
Liverpool (Stanley)	572,971
Ramsgate (Dumpton Park)	537,167
Slough	521,787
Chester	491,920
Rochester & Chatham	483,828
Gloucester & Cheltenham	481,182
Liverpool (Seaforth)	474,668
Reading (Oxford Road)	470,270
Middlesbrough	445,804
Newcastle (White City)	432,231
Portsmouth	423,373
Bolton	418,354
Ashington (Co Durham)	398,713
Bradford (City)	377,796
Plymouth	366,151
Glasgow (Firhill)	364,783
Hull (Old Craven Park)	364,692
Nottingham (White City)	360,452
Sunderland	356,056
Stoke-on-Trent (Cobridge)	338,596
Oxford	332,947
Stoke-on-Trent (Hanley)	329,540
Derby	326,400
Aberdeen	324,927
Blackburn	321,584
Preston	320,707
West Hartlepool	309,036
Sheffield (Hyde Park)	300,085
Stanley (Co Durham)	287,236
Yarmouth	286,863
Warrington	283,014
Willenhall	279,274
Norwich (City)	243,346
Bristol (Knowle)	243,140
Newport	230,525
Exeter (County Ground)	217,897
Houghton-le-Spring	204,338
Luton	199,727
Rayleigh (Essex)	193,423

Stadium	Turnover £
Norwich (Boundary Park)	192,450
Exeter (Marsh Barton)	187,518
Long Eaton	179,143
Ipswich	176,639
Rochdale	165,007
Doncaster (Spotbrough)	158,556
St Helens	157,653
London (Southall)	157,477
Keighley	154,346
Tamworth	152,956
Stockport (Hazel Grove)	147,308
London (Harlington Corner)	140,780
Ayr (Tams Brig)	139,808
Easington (Co Durham)	128,914
Wigan (Poolstock)	119,194
London (Stratford)	118,899
Oldham	110,254
Staines	106,940
Wallyford (East Lothian)	105,528
Taunton (Prior Park)	86,804
Wigan (Woodhouse)	85,282
Workington	84,520
Peterborough	82,563
Kilmarnock	81,824
Coundon (Co Durham)	75,005
Leeds (Parkside)	72,916
Rotherham	69,430
Ramsgate (Newington)	61,547
Wakefield	60,332
Kingskerswell (Devon)	59,719
Pelaw Grange	55,711
Northampton	52,847
Stockton-on-Tees (Belle Vue)	48,488
Durham City	47,934
Belmont (Co Durham)	43,250
Edinburgh (Stenhouse)	40,645
Barry	29,360
Aldershot	29,267
Glasgow (Mount Vernon)	20,559
Irvine (Townhead)	9,932
Cradley Heath	9,780

Summary

Country	No of tracks+	Turnover
England	168	£ 79,923,552
Wales	10	£ 755,069
Scotland	40	£ 5,568,723
Total	218	£ 85,643,207

+ number of tracks include those without a tote in operation
