= 1950 UK & Ireland Greyhound Racing Year =

The 1950 UK & Ireland Greyhound Racing Year was the 25th year of greyhound racing in the United Kingdom and the 24th year of greyhound racing in Ireland.

== Roll of honour ==
Major Winners
Award	Name of Winner
1950 English Greyhound Derby	Ballymac Ball
1950 Irish Greyhound Derby	Crossmolina Rambler
1950 Scottish Greyhound Derby	Behattans Choice
1950 Welsh Greyhound Derby	Ballycurreen Garrett

== Summary ==
The annual totalisator was £70,408,231, a fourth consecutive drop since 1946. Seventy-one of the tracks were affiliated to the National Greyhound Racing Club (NGRC) which accounted for £61,068,000 of the total. The drop at the 71 tracks constituted 18% and paid attendances were 21,549,000, a drop of 10%. The returns further increased the friction between the industry and the government, with the former blaming the tote tax cost of £9,182,000 in addition to normal income tax on other areas of the business.

Ballymac Ball continued his exceptional form from 1949 by winning the English Greyhound Derby.

== Tracks ==
The Boyne Valley Greyhound Stadium in Navan and Spennymoor Greyhound Stadium both open.

== Competitions ==
The News of the World in association with the National Greyhound Racing Club announced plans to sponsor a national intertrack competition Ballymac Ball who had been phenomenal during the Laurels the year before and 1,000 Guineas and Trafalgar Cup champion Ballycurren Garrett.

Ballycurren Garrett made amends for his disappointing Derby showing when travelling to Cardiff Arms Park and lifting the Welsh Greyhound Derby crown. Drumgoon Boy was five lengths adrift in second and Red Wind finish fifth despite starting at odds of 11-10. The time of 29.22 recorded by Ballycurren Garrett broke the existing track record. In Scotland, the third Derby event of the year was won by Wembley’s Behattans Choice, who held off veteran West End Dasher for a comfortable win. Behattans Choice a brindle dog and Westend Dasher a fawn dog were both trained by Bob Burls and he made the decision to take the pair over to Ireland for the Irish Greyhound Derby.

The newly crowned Derby champion Ballymac Ball successfully defended his Laurels title and was then retired to stud.

== News ==
A vaccine is eventually found for hard pad disease, better known as distemper. Francis Gentle, vice chairman of the Greyhound Racing Association (GRA) and chairman of the Association for the Protection for Copyright in Sport proposes to prohibit the televising of all sports until the law changes. The 1950 movie The Blue Lamp is filmed at White City.

Drumgoon Boy and Red Wind, two champions were now under the training of Fred Trevillion after their owner/trainer Frank Davis was undergoing an investigation in relation to 'ringing' (running a greyhound in a false name). Frank Davis was found guilty of running the brilliant Red Wind without proof of pedigree along with another greyhound called Rindiffin D. The court believed Red Wind to be a former Irish pup called Waggles, a fact disputed by Davis. Nevertheless Davis was imprisoned for fraud and all of his greyhounds disqualified by the NGRC.

The introduction of a new trainers licence went ahead; it was called a C Licence and would allow private trainers to run their greyhounds in graded racing at tracks in addition to the resident trainers. Oxford Stadium was the first track to experiment with the scheme. Also at Oxford the continuing problem of taxation was evident when they announced that during the first eleven months of the year they had paid £21,595 tote tax, £9,459 bookmaker tax and £4,152 entertainment duty forcing owner Leslie Calcutt to make the announcement that they would close during December until further notice.

The Instaprint photo finish and timer that was tested at Wimbledon Stadium was given the seal of approval to use throughout Britain and weighing scales became mandatory at all tracks.

Frederick Johnson is finally issued a private trainers licence, the breeder from Tarpoley in Cheshire had been refused a licence since 1946. His Rushton News made the Irish Laurels final in 1948 and Johnson has plans to breed with him. He does breed and rear litter by Mad Tanist, out of Summer Frock which includes Rushton Smutty. Rushton News will soon sire a greyhound called Rushton Spot.

== Ireland ==
Mayo dog Crossmolina Rambler claimed the 1950 Irish Greyhound Derby and Spanish Chestnut won a second successive Irish Laurels.

== Principal UK races ==
Grand National, White City (May 20 525y h, £250)
Pos	Name of Greyhound	Trainer	SP	Time	Trap
1st	Blossom of Annagura	Jack Sherry	5-2	29.97	5
2nd	Muncross Dan	Hugh Kennedy	15-8f	30.07	1
3rd	Sunny Abbey	Jerry Hannafin	4-1	30.15	4
4th	Ross Abbey	Clare Orton	20-1	30.33	2
5th	Ballygiltenane Schoolhouse	Gray	7-2	00.00	3

Gold Collar, Catford (Jun 3, 440y, £600)
Pos	Name of Greyhound	Trainer	SP	Time	Trap
1st	Islandeady	H.G.Copsey	8-1	26.07	4
2nd	Kismet D	Fred Trevillion	2-1	26.19	2
3rd	Belingas Fancy	Ron Chamberlain	6-1	26.25	3
4th	Quare Customer	Leslie Reynolds	11-8f	26.35	1
5th	Tow Law Lad		20-1	26.47	6
6th	Song of the Fertha	Gordon Nicholson	100-6	26.65	5

Welsh Derby, Arms Park (Jul 8, 525y £500)
Pos	Name of Greyhound	Trainer	SP	Time	Trap
1st	Ballycurreen Garrett	Jack Harvey	100-30	29.22+	4
2nd	Drumgoon Boy	Fred Trevillion	8-1	29.62	1
3rd	Cleofortis	William Mills	9-2	29.74	3
4th	Behattans Choice	Bob Burls	4-1	29.94	6
5th	Red Wind	Fred Trevillion	11-10f	30.10	2
6th	Galtee Tanist	Private	20-1	30.28	5

+ Track Record

Scottish Greyhound Derby, Carntyne (Jul 15, 525y, £250)
Pos	Name of Greyhound	Trainer	SP	Time	Trap
1st	Behattans Choice	Bob Burls	4-6f	29.35	4
2nd	West End Dasher	Bob Burls	3-1	29.67	5
3rd	Special Intention	Jimmy Jowett	9-2	29.71	6
4th	Mad Your Honour	Manchester	5-1	29.72	2
5th	Line Command	M Gemmell	100-8	30.20	1
6th	Musical Charles	M Darbyshire	4-1	30.36	3

Scurry Gold Cup, Clapton (Jul 22, 400y £500)
Pos	Name of Greyhound	Trainer	SP	Time	Trap
1st	Gortnagory	Norman Merchant	3-1	23.47	1
2nd	Islandeady	H.G.Copsey	5-1	23.67	3
3rd	Santa Barbara II	R.A.Williams	2-1f	23.79 5	
4th	Cold and Shaggy	H.G.Copsey	10-1	23.82	6
5th	Harvest King		7-1	23.90	4
6th	Behattan Majestic	Bob Burls	4-1	23.91	1

Laurels, Wimbledon (Aug 25, 500y, £600)
Pos	Name of Greyhound	Trainer	SP	Time	Trap
1st	Ballymac Ball	Stan Martin	15-8	28.19	4
2nd	Behattans Choice	Bob Burls	10-11f	28.47	1
3rd	Fancy Hero	Jack Harvey	100-6	28.59	6
4th	Magna Hasty	Stan Martin	7-1	28.07	3
5th	Olivers Lad	Jack Brennan	10-1	28.09	5
6th	Hunters Luck		66-1	28.13	2

St Leger, Wembley (Sep 16, 700y, £600)
Pos	Name of Greyhound	Trainer	SP	Time	Trap
1st	Fawn Mack	George Curtis	11-10f	40.56	6
2nd	Express Spot	Reg 'String' Marsh	10-1	40.62	2
3rd	Kilcaskin Mail	Frank Wynne	6-1	40.64	3
4th	Linden Grove	Jack Harvey	8-1	40.74	4
5th	Captain the Killer	Norman Merchant	2-1	40.92	1
6th	January Errand		50-1	41.08	5

Oaks, White City (Sep 30, 525y, £500)
Pos	Name of Greyhound	Trainer	SP	Time	Trap
1st	Caledonian Faith	Arthur Mountfield	8-1	29.62	2
2nd	Mad Winkle	Stan Biss	7-2	29.63	3
3rd	Fawn Mack	George Curtis	13-8f	29.64	6
4th	Linden Grove	Jack Harvey	5-2	29.88	1
5th	Bridget O'Leer	P Currie	100-7	29.92	4
6th	Small Rogue	Gaskin	100-8	29.96	5

The Grand Prix Walthamstow (Oct 7, 525y, £500)
Pos	Name of Greyhound	Trainer	SP	Time	Trap
1st	Arrow Boy	Jack Harvey	5-1	30.28	4
2nd	Derryboy Blackbird	Jack Harvey	9-4f	30.56	5
3rd	Brussels Sprouts	J Walsh	6-1	30.59	6
4th	Cleofortis	William Mills	7-2	30.75	1
5th	Whistling Laddie	Stan Martin	9-2	31.31	3
6th	Behattan Martell	Bob Burls	10-1	31.71	2

Cesarewitch, West Ham (Oct 20, 600y, £600)
Pos	Name of Greyhound	Trainer	SP	Time	Trap
1st	Quare Customer	Leslie Reynolds	11-10f	30.80	1
2nd	Fancy Hero	Jack Harvey	3-1	30.96	2
3rd	Stoneyhill Sweep	Harry Ward	8-1	31.12	6
4th	Behattans Choice	Bob Burls	5-2	31.15	4
5th	Cleofortis	Paddy Power	50-1	31.39	5
6th	Glendart Tulip	Ronnie Melville	66-1	31.51	3

== Totalisator Returns ==
Extended content

The totalisator returns declared to the licensing authorities for the year 1950 are listed below. Tracks that did not have a totalisator in operation are not listed.

Stadium	Turnover £
London (White City)	5,402,244
London (Harringay)	3,809,428
London (Wembley)	3,465,254
London (Wimbledon)	2,979,574
London (Walthamstow)	2,742,584
London (Stamford Bridge)	2,015,525
London (Wandsworth)	1,948,350
London (Clapton)	1,927,747
Manchester (Belle Vue)	1,835,193
London (Catford)	1,738,666
London (West Ham)	1,691,874
London (Park Royal)	1,599,124
London (Hackney)	1,379,992
London (New Cross)	1,353,021
London (Hendon)	1,164,566
Glasgow (Shawfield)	1,021,159
Brighton & Hove	997,678
Manchester (White City)	989,595
London (Charlton)	872,693
Edinburgh (Powderhall)	865,292
Romford	853,562
Birmingham (Perry Barr, old)	798,925
Crayford & Bexleyheath	786,300
Manchester (Salford)	772,353
London (Dagenham)	714,323
Birmingham (Hall Green)	692,232
Sheffield (Owlerton)	669,500
Glasgow (White City)	655,126
Newcastle (Brough Park)	648,673
Cardiff (Arms Park)	643,279
Southend-on-Sea	633,674
Wolverhampton (Monmore)	620,364
Southampton	618,113
Bristol (Eastville)	595,741
Bradford (Greenfield)	588,264
Birmingham (Kings Heath)	554,332
Newcastle (Gosforth)	550,080
Glasgow (Carntyne)	548,360
Liverpool (Seaforth)	538,963
Coventry (Lythalls Lane)	537,589
Sheffield (Darnall)	519,574
Glasgow (Albion)	519,378

Stadium	Turnover £
Blackpool (St Anne's)	500,972
Gateshead	495,778
Leeds (Elland Road)	475,641
Liverpool (White City)	455,321
Slough	428,003
Liverpool (Stanley)	423,152
Ramsgate (Dumpton Park)	422,184
South Shields	394,906
Chester	368,697
Leicester (Blackbird Rd)	365,230
Willenhall	365,039
Reading (Oxford Road)	360,107
Bolton	352,029
Newcastle (White City)	348,906
Gloucester & Cheltenham	336,317
Portsmouth	335,660
Ashington (Co Durham)	329,825
Hull (Old Craven Park)	329,417
Bradford (City)	323,850
Rochester & Chatham	319,081
Middlesbrough	317,689
Derby	292,558
Plymouth	286,964
Preston	286,556
Nottingham (White City)	277,957
West Hartlepool	273,288
Blackburn	267,630
Glasgow (Firhill)	259,543
Aberdeen	258,582
Sunderland	257,623
Stoke-on-Trent (Cobridge)	254,911
Warrington	243,170
Stoke-on-Trent (Hanley)	237,804
Sheffield (Hyde Park)	237,439
Cradley Heath	233,821
Oxford	225,898
Norwich (City)	216,651
Newport	214,170
Stanley (Co Durham)	208,673
Exeter (County Ground)	207,075
Yarmouth	200,750
Bristol (Knowle)	186,784

Stadium	Turnover £
Luton	178,813
Keighley	170,740
Tamworth	165,359
Houghton-le-Spring	145,055
Norwich (Boundary Park)	144,275
Ipswich	141,375
Rochdale	133,116
London (Southall)	129,972
Stockport (Hazel Grove)	115,384
Wallyford (East Lothian)	113,022
Doncaster (Spotbrough)	110,815
Ayr (Tams Brig)	105,773
Exeter (Marsh Barton)	103,763
Oldham	101,088
London (Harlington Corner)	93,946
Wigan (Poolstock)	90,251
Long Eaton	89,730
Easington (Co Durham)	89,160
Peterborough	85,720
Stockton-on-Tees (Belle Vue)	77,675
Wigan (Woodhouse)	72,725
Wakefield	65,761
Rotherham	59,438
Workington	53,397
Staines	50,381
Coundon (Co Durham)	46,553
Edinburgh (Stenhouse)	46,091
Northampton	43,281
Ramsgate (Newington)	42,998
Pelaw Grange (Co Durham)	38,723
Durham City	38,192
Kingskerswell (Devon)	37,461
Taunton (Prior Park)	35,296
Rayleigh (Essex)	32,479
Belmont (Co Durham)	31,161
Barry	30,499
Spennymoor (Co Durham)	30,441
Leeds (Parkside)	24,067
St Helens	13,778
Thornton (Fife)	12,039
Aldershot	7,961
Irvine (Townhead)	6,953

Summary

Country	No of tracks+	Turnover
England	165	£ 65,277,440
Wales	10	£ 673,778
Scotland	40	£ 4,457,013
Total	215	£ 70,408,231

+ number of tracks include those without a tote in operation
