= 1933 UK & Ireland Greyhound Racing Year =

The 1933 UK & Ireland Greyhound Racing Year was the eighth year of greyhound racing in the United Kingdom and the seventh year of greyhound racing in Ireland.

== Roll of honour ==
Major Winners
Award	Name of Winner
1933 English Greyhound Derby	Future Cutlet
1933 Irish Greyhound Derby	Monologue
1933 Scottish Greyhound Derby	S.L.D
1933 Welsh Greyhound Derby	Beef Cutlet

== Summary ==
The industry continued to experience a boom with attendances steadily increasing. However the totalisator ban enforced by the government was impacting profits with 17,000 jobs affected. The situation did not deter new tracks opening, with at least 28 known tracks starting racing during 1933. Future Cutlet won the 1933 English Greyhound Derby before being retired, his owner Mr Evershed set up a trust fund for the champion so that he would live in luxury for the rest of his life.

== Tracks ==
London remained the main focus point for racing with Walthamstow Stadium, New Cross Stadium, Wandsworth Stadium and Stamford Bridge joining the tracks already operating. A small flapping track (independent) called the Crooked Billet Greyhound & Whippet track was bought by William Chandler who then went about building Walthamstow. Wandsworth stadium cost £100,000 to build and seated 20,000 and New Cross could accommodate 25,000 people but was only an independent track at this stage. Stamford Bridge was capable of holding 100,000 spectators and was home to Chelsea F.C.; the Greyhound Racing Association (GRA) controlled the Stamford Bridge racing with the track's supply of runners coming from the GRA kennels at the Hook Estate in Northaw.

The availability of a venue for greyhound racing did not seem to be a problem and included Thorpe Greyhound Track (an ice skating rink in the winter) and Derby Greyhound Stadium (a former prison).

=== Tracks opened ===
Date	Stadium/Track	Location	Ref
4 January	Wakefield Greyhound Stadium	Wakefield	
12 January	Owlerton Stadium	Sheffield	
25 February	Seaforth Greyhound Stadium	Liverpool	
? February	Halfway Greyhound Track	Kingskerswell	
11 March	Horsley Hill	South Shields	
27 March	Blackburn Greyhound Stadium	Blackburn	
1 April	Hyde Park Greyhound Stadium	Sheffield	
7 April	Squires Gate Greyhound Stadium	Blackpool	
15 April	Southend Stadium	Southend-on-Sea	
15 April	Wandsworth Stadium	London	
29 April	Derby Greyhound Stadium	Derby	
27 May	Lonsdale Park	Workington	
7 June	Holburn Stadium	Aberdeen	
9 June	Oldham Greyhound Stadium	Oldham	
9 June	Barrmill Stadium	Galston	
17 June	Thorpe Greyhound Track	Norwich	
19 June	Walthamstow Stadium	London	
23 June	Granvue Greyhound Stadium	Stevenston	
24 June	White City Stadium	Nottingham	
24 June	Aylesbury and District	Hartwell	
? June	New Cross Stadium	London	
22 July	Gloucester & Cheltenham Stadium	Longlevens	
31 July	Rotherham Greyhound Stadium	Rotherham	
3 August	Enniscorthy Greyhound Stadium	Enniscorthy	
12 August	Cappielow Park	Greenock	
21 August	Irvine Caledonian Stadium	Irvine	
6 October	Blantyre Greyhound Stadium	Blantyre	
16 December	Tams Brig Greyhound Stadium	Ayr	
unknown (pre-November)	Stamford Bridge	London	

== News ==
Nine famous greyhounds from the GRA kennels, at Northaw, appeared at Selfridges in Oxford Street which attracted 10,000 visitors.

== Competitions ==
The newly inaugurated Gold Collar at Catford Stadium offered £1,000 prize money, a substantial amount only surpassed by the English Greyhound Derby itself. The Derby champion Wild Woolley back with Jack Rimmer, added this new event to his successes. A second major event was introduced in Scotland at Powderhall Stadium called the Edinburgh Cup.

Beef Cutlet easily defeated his rivals during the Welsh Greyhound Derby final at White City Stadium, Cardiff in a time of 29.56 seconds, before Long Hop failed to defend his Grand National title, following a short head defeat to Scapegoat. Three weeks after the Derby, Beef Cutlet surprisingly lost to Elsell in the Cesarewitch final but made amends in the Record Stakes at Wimbledon winning the race against four of the best dogs in training, Future Cutlet, Goofy Gear, Brave Enough and Failing.

A new star called Creamery Border came to prominence when winning the Scurry Gold Cup, he was put with Arthur 'Doc' Callanan who was now a trainer at Wembley and had nursed the dog back to health in 1931. This was his first track event in England and went unbeaten throughout the competition. Winning his heat and semi-final, he went on to win the final by six lengths in a track record time, from Chesterfield Jewel, with the Oaks winner Queen of the Suir behind them. The Laurels went to Wild Woolley, trained by Jimmy Campbell once again; Queen of the Suir made the Laurels final before successfully defending her Oaks title for trainer Stanley Biss one month later. Creamery Border went lame and failed to finish in the semi-finals of the Laurels.

== Ireland ==
In Ireland the owners of Harold's Cross Stadium were left angered when Shelbourne Park was once again handed the Irish Greyhound Derby. Mr Tynan representing the track had pointed out that the previous year Paddy O'Donoghue had promised that they could hold the event in 1933. Irish Coursing Club chairman John Bruton explained that they could not cancel a ruling by the club that had already made. Tynan stormed out of a meeting with Harold's Cross refusing to run any classic competitions or their qualifying races and threatened to run their own Irish Championship.

Brilliant Bob, a May 1931 whelp, by Other Days out of Birchfield Bessie was bred in County Tipperary by Billy Quinn, and he sold a half share to an Irish farmer. The dog came into prominence as a puppy, when he won Ireland's oldest coursing event, the Tipperary Cup. When he was introduced to track racing the brindle-fawn dog finished runner-up in the Easter Cup and then won the St Leger at Clonmel Greyhound Stadium over 550 yards in 31.53.

== Principal UK races ==
Gold Collar, Catford (May 20, 400y, £1,000)
Pos	Name of Greyhound	Trainer	SP	Time (sec)	Trap
1st	Wild Woolley	Jack Rimmer	1-3f	26.63	4
2nd	Deemster Mike	Fred Livesly	3-1	26.71	1
3rd	Doctor Gray	Arthur Doc Callanan	25-1	26.83	3
U	Luttrell	(West Ham)	100-7		2
U	Luvett's Double	Albert Bedford	100-7		5
U	Warrior Guide	Arthur 'Doc' Callanan	25-1		6

Welsh Derby, White City (Cardiff) (Jun 3, 525y, £80)
Pos	Name of Greyhound	Trainer	SP	Time	Trap
1st	Beef Cutlet	John Hegarty		29.56	2
2nd	Dashing Cut	Arthur 'Doc' Callanan		30.20	3
3rd	Hingam Happy			30.52	4
4th	Scartaglin Rover				1

Grand National, White City (Jun 10, 525y h, £300)
Pos	Name of Greyhound	Trainer	SP	Time	Trap
1st	Scapegoat	Albert Jonas	6-1	31.20	4
2nd	Long Hop	Johnny Bullock	13-8	31.21	1
3rd	Scallywag II	Claude Champion	4-5f	31.29	3
4th	Bronze Dragon	Stan Martin	20-1		2

Cesarewitch, West Ham (Jul 15, 600y, £450)
Pos	Name of Greyhound	Trainer	SP	Time	Trap
1st	Elsell	William Dixon	100-7	34.22	5
2nd	Beef Cutlet	John Hegarty	1-5f	34.42	4
3rd	Benhur	(West Ham)	100-6	34.90	3
U	Racketeer II		100-6		1
U	Roving Loafer	Sidney Probert	33-1		2
U	English Warrior	Barlow	33-1		6

Scottish Greyhound Derby, Carntyne (Jul 22, 525y, £130)
Pos	Name of Greyhound	Trainer	SP	Time	Trap
1st	S.L.D	Jack Tallantire	4-9f	30.30	5
2nd	Mick That Miser	(Powderhall)	6-1	30.46	1
3rd	Doona Knot		5-1	30.54	2
U	Nightlight		20-1		3
U	Readable		12-1		4
U	Haughty Boy II		10-1		6

Scurry Gold Cup, Clapton (Aug 5, 400y, £600)
Pos	Name of Greyhound	Trainer	SP	Time	Trap
1st	Creamery Border	Doc Callanan	13-8	23.31+	1
2nd	Chesterfield Jewel	Leslie Reynolds	100-8	23.79	2
3rd	Roysterer	Bob Burls	8-1	24.03	6
U	Queen of the Suir	Stanley Biss	11-10f		5
U	Clandown Swallow	Paddy Fortune	100-6		3
U	Geraldus	Catford	100-6		4

Laurels, Wimbledon (Sep 2, 500y, £700)
Pos	Name of Greyhound	Trainer	SP	Time	Trap
1st	Wild Woolley	Jimmy Campbell	100-30	28.80	6
2nd	Clandown Swallow	Paddy Fortune	100-8	29.04	5
3rd	Silver Seal II	Johnny Bullock	7-4f	29.05	1
U	Queen of the Suir	Stanley Biss	4-1		2
U	Bronze Dragon	Stan Martin	33-1		3
U	Fallinga	Jerry Hannafin	3-1		4

St Leger, Wembley (Sep 30, 700y, £600)
Pos	Name of Greyhound	Trainer	SP	Time	Trap
1st	The Daw	Sidney Probert	6-4f	41.24	1
2nd	Trinidad	Leslie Reynolds	3-1	41.68	2
3rd	English Warrior	Barlow	7-4	41.92	4
4th	Top Pace	Sidney Orton	10-1		3

Oaks, White City (Oct 28, 525y, £300)
Pos	Name of Greyhound	Trainer	SP	Time	Trap
1st	Queen of the Suir	Stanley Biss	2-5f	30.23	2
2nd	Gladsome Rose	Charlie Ashley	7-1	30.47	4
3rd	Morris Warrior	D Costello	100-8	30.55	3
U	Avion Beauty	Leslie Reynolds	33-1		1
U	Just an Idea	Johnny Bullock	25-1		5
U	Sweet Cherry	Stanley Biss	6-1		6

== Key ==
U = unplaced
+ = Track Record
