= Wisbech Greyhound Stadium =

Greyhound racing venue in Wisbech, England

- Interactive map of Wisbech Greyhound Stadium
- Location: South Brink, near Wisbech
- Coordinates: 52°39′05″N 0°08′34″E

Construction
- Built: 1939
- Opened: (official opening 1948)
- Closed: 2007

Tenants
- Greyhound racing & stock cars

The Wisbech Greyhound Stadium is a former greyhound racing venue near Wisbech.

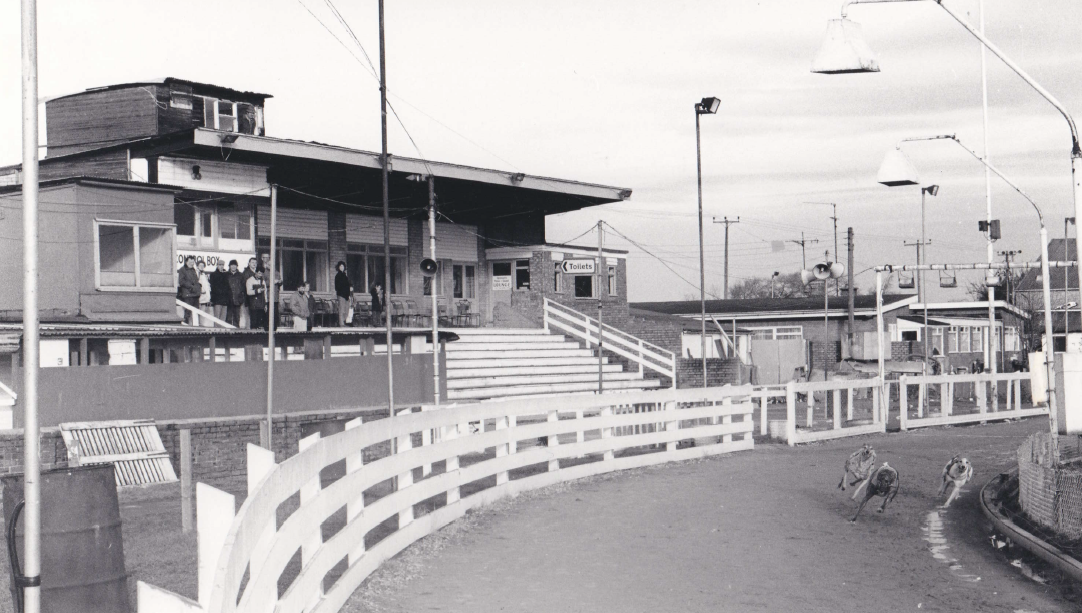
Wisbech Greyhound Stadium c.1970

== Origins ==
Wisbech is a market town in The Fens of Cambridgeshire, England. The area had strong coursing ties. The oval form of greyhound racing began to appear in this part of the country not long after the introduction of track racing in 1926 that gripped London and major cities around the country.

Norwich to the east would experience four tracks; The Firs Stadium, Boundary Park Stadium, Thorpe Greyhound Track and the City Stadium, Norwich in the following years. The Wisbech track was a small circuit situated alongside the South Brink just north of New Bridge Street. The track ran parallel with the River Nene on its west side and the Cromwell Road on its east side. The location was rural and the track relied solely on the town of Wisbech to the north for its custom.

== Opening ==
The Wisbech Sports Stadium, as it was known officially, opened on Whit Monday 17 May 1948. It was a small arena with no major facilities of note available for the public. Nevertheless 4,500 people turned up to see the greyhound racing officially opened by Colonel J W A Ollard and managed by Freddie Bamber. Fifteen bookmakers attended and basic facilities included a tea room and marquee. The eight race winner's owners received a case of cutlery. It is believed that it was built around the end of World War II to capitalise on the greyhound racing boom. The 1947 track listing states that it could hold 2,000 spectators; it is clear that the track was independent and would have attracted mainly those from the 'flapping' (unlicensed) fraternity.

Another venue the Wheatley Bank Sports Stadium, nearby in Walsoken raced on Monday, Wednesday and Saturday evenings and existed from 1939 until 1948.

== History ==
In 1966 the current owner Herbert Barrett branched out by purchasing another independent track at King's Lynn, and introduced greyhound racing there. Wisbech is known to have had a large covered stand and licensed bar and coffee room by the 1960s, in addition to an undercover kennel and paddock complex with fifty kennels. During the 1960s racing took place on Wednesday and Saturday evenings at 7.30 pm, the circumference of the track was 430 yards, with an inside hare and distances of 310, 460, 525 and 760 yards. The surface was all-sand and described as having easy bends. The stature of the track had improved immensely, with the construction of resident kennels, looked after by Jack Goldsmith, and an increase in track bookmakers to seven bookmakers in attendance with a racing management team of Graham Welland and Dennis Hayward.

By 1980 little had changed except that racing was on Friday nights instead of Saturdays. A company called Spedeworth International purchased the track and introduced stock cars; and they were also keen for the greyhound operation to grow. The greyhound promotion came under the control of former National Greyhound Racing Club (NGRC) trainer Eric Vine, who had also been working part-time at Nottingham Greyhound Stadium. Vine applied to the NGRC in 1987 for a permit licence (a type of licence allocated by the NGRC that allowed racing under the NGRC rules), hoping to move the track forward in terms of integrity from unlicensed racing to NGRC rules.

The licence was granted, and after investment such as racing surface improvements, increasing the number of racing kennels and ensuring NGRC specifications were adhered to, the track was ready to make its debut under NGRC rules. Distances by now were 275, 460, 700 and 900 metres with a new circumference of 440 metres. The debut was in January 1989.

After just a few years trading, Vine pulled out, and the racing ceased in 1993 with the site being used just for Sunday markets afterwards. Three years later, in 1996, the Meads family took over as promoters, with the intention to re-open the stadium to NGRC racing. Gary Meads, a former bookmaker, then spent two years and a considerable sum upgrading the facilities and also appointed former Peterborough racing manager Mike Middle. On 27 March 1999 NGRC racing was under way again. The hare system had been changed from an 'Inside Sumner' to the new Swaffham, and once again race distances changed, this time to 250, 440 and 630 metres. The Wisbech trainers included Henry Chalkley and Michael Bacon.

== Stock Car Racing ==
The stadium opened for Stock Car racing on 23 May 1970. The sport continued there until its closure, often hosting major championship meetings. The track had its own successful team, the Wisbech Fen Tigers, who won the "Auto Spedeway" League in 1971.

== Closure ==
Racing under rules only lasted until 20 Sep 2001, although the track continued to run independent racing until 2007. After it closed for good it was bulldozed, but nothing happened to the site until 2011, when Tesco announced plans to build a superstore and cinema complex there.

== Track records ==
Distance metres	Greyhound	Time (sec)	Date
275	Tomas Creake	16.84	1987
430	Midway Alice	27.82	7 May 1999
430	Three Wells	27.74	27 July 2000
460	Derby Hero	28.85	1987
460	Slaneyside Holly	28.78	23 January 1990
