= Priory Park =

Priory Park may refer to:

- Priory Park, Chichester
- Priory Park, Dudley
- Priory Park, Great Malvern, home to notable specimens of Davidia involucrata
- Priory Park, Haringey, London
- Priory Park, Southend-on-Sea
- Priory Park, Upton Park, London
- Priory Park, Warwick
- Priory Park Sports Ground, Taunton

== See also ==
- Prior Park
