= Edinburgh Street Recreation Ground =

Former sports venue in Swindon, Wiltshire, England

- Interactive map of Edinburgh Street Recreation Ground
- Location: Edinburgh Street, Gorse Hill, Swindon, Wiltshire
- Coordinates: 51°34′22″N 1°46′23″W

Construction
- Opened: c.1920

Edinburgh Street Recreation Ground was a former football and greyhound racing track Edinburgh Street, Gorse Hill, Swindon, Wiltshire.

It is not to be confused with the Gorse Hill Speedway Dirt Track which was located to west on Cricklade Road and hosted meetings in 1928–1930.

== Football ==
The ground was the home of Swindon Corinthians FC who joined the Wiltshire League in 1920.

== Greyhound racing ==
Greyhound racing took place from Friday 15 May 1931. The racing was independent (not affiliated to the sport's governing body, the National Greyhound Racing Club), and the venue was known as a "flapping" track, which was the nickname given to independent tracks. The racing was organised by the Bedminster Racing Company and the first winner was a greyhound called Kingston. The track was short-lived and experienced an incident-packed second meeting when police removed the six track bookmakers because they did not have a licence to bet.
