= Doncaster Stadium =

Doncaster Stadium may refer to:

- Keepmoat Stadium, a multi-purpose stadium in Doncaster built in 2006, home to Doncaster Rovers F.C.
- Doncaster Greyhound Stadium, a greyhound racing and former speedway stadium also known as Meadow Court Stadium and Stainforth Stadium.
- Doncaster Greyhound Track, a former greyhound racing, speedway and stock car stadium from 1928 to 1986.
- Belle Vue (Doncaster), a former football stadium, home ground of Doncaster Rovers F.C. from 1922 to 2007.
