= Newington Greyhound Stadium =

Sports venue in Kent, England

- Location: Newington Road, Newington, Thanet, Kent
- Coordinates: 51°20′42″N 1°23′51″E
- Opened: 1928
- Closed: 1954

The Newington Greyhound Stadium was a greyhound racing stadium on Newington Road, Newington, Thanet, Kent.

== Origins ==
A greyhound track was constructed during the late 1920s on a spare plot of land on the north side of Bush Avenue and the west side of Newington Road. Access was from Newington Road. Terracing, kennels and a paddock were located on the stadium's north side. The kennels were adjacent to the later Melbourne Avenue.

== History ==
It is believed that it opened on 26 May 1928. The track was confirmed as operating during 1932, and in 1935 the joint proprietors George and James Perry applied for betting facilities on 27 June 1935.

The racing was independent (not affiliated to the sports governing body, the National Greyhound Racing Club). It was later owned by the Ramsgate Sports Stadium Ltd company.

Totalisator turnover figures from 1946 to 1950 were £168,502 (1946), £138,664 (1947), £111,109 (1948), £61,547 (1949) and £42,998 (1950).

== Closure ==
The track raced until 1954. The site now is occupied by Ramsgate art primary school.
