= Houghton Stadium =

Greyhound racing stadium in County Durham

- Location: Houghton-le-Spring, County Durham
- Coordinates: 54°50′15″N 1°27′44″W
- Opened: 1938
- Closed: 1971

Houghton Stadium was a greyhound racing stadium in Houghton-le-Spring, County Durham.

== Origins ==
The track was constructed on the east side of Hall Lane and north of Gillas Lane and was initially used for horse racing and whippet racing. The Hetton Race Company Ltd brought greyhounds to the Houghton Le Spring Racecourse in County Durham in 1938.

== Opening ==
Greyhound racing started on Thursday 3 November 1938 serving as entertainment for the mining community from the nearby colliery.

== History ==
The racing was independent (not affiliated to the National Greyhound Racing Club) and racing was held on Tuesday nights and Saturday afternoons on a grass track 390 yards in circumference. Race distances were 290, 480 and 675 yards with an inside Sumner hare system. Facilities included a licensed club and free car park with the principal race being the Houghton Feast handicap. There were on course bookmakers and a totalisator in operation.

== Closure ==
The stadium continued to trade until 1971 before being turned into the Racecourse housing estate. That same estate came to prominence in the 1990s after being named as a problem area in Britain. A report found that 80% of people with nothing to occupy their time had contributed to the problems.
