= Hazel Grove Greyhound Stadium =

Former greyhound racing stadium in Greater Manchester, England

- Location: Macclesfield Road, Hazel Grove, Stockport, Greater Manchester
- Coordinates: 53°22′24″N 2°06′43″W
- Opened: 1932
- Closed: 1960

Hazel Grove Greyhound Stadium was a greyhound racing stadium in Hazel Grove, Stockport, Greater Manchester.

== Origins ==
The suburb of Hazel Grove lies in the south-east of the Metropolitan Borough of Stockport. In 1932, a new greyhound track was proposed and the Building Committee of the Hazel Grove and Bramhall Urban District Council passed the plans in January 1932. The track was constructed just south of the London, Midland and Scottish Railway viaduct and north of the Buxton line. The stadium was accessed off the east side of Macclesfield Road.

The surroundings at the time were sparsely populated, but the track was able to include the town of Stockport within its catchment area; with sixty omnibuses passing the stadium every hour on a variety of routes, it was expected to be a success. The Stockport Greyhound Racing Co. Ltd. that initiated the construction was led by their Chairman J.W. Marples, a well-known dog judge.

The build was subject to considerable controversy because the council was adamant that the site was required for future dwelling-houses and residential buildings. This led them to refuse planning permission and subsequently ban the work that had already started. Mr W Gardener acting for the new stadium owners stated that “The position is that whether the council approves the plans or not, the project can be carried through. We have secured a five year lease on the ground with an option to purchase, and should the council ever wish to make a road through this ground, as is suggested, the track can be moved to another position.”

== Opening ==
The first meeting was held on the Saturday afternoon of 23 December 1932. Originally there was no tote, due to government restrictions at the time, the racing kennels were situated parallel to the Macclesfield Road; the resident kennels were to be found a short distance from the track in Buxton Road. Stands were erected in each enclosure just in time for the opening although work continued afterwards to increase the capacity of the stadium.

== Pre-war history ==
The track applied for a licence with the National Greyhound Racing Society (NGRS) and it is known to have been granted but, in 1934, they were affiliated with the rival British Greyhound Tracks Control Society (BGTCS) when the track raced on Saturday afternoons. The main distance was 500 yards and a 'Sumner' hare system was used.

During 1935, John Sharp, a businessman and bus company owner, purchased the stadium which also hosted a speedway meeting believed to have been on 5 May 1937

== Post-war history ==
Business peaked in 1946 with totalisator turnover of £469,889. and was an independent (unaffiliated to a governing body) track at this stage. The track circumference at this time was recorded as 430 yards, with distances of 310 and 525 yards.

== Closure ==
In March 1960, John Sharp the stadium owner decided to sell ten acres of the site to City and Town Buildings Ltd of London. Sharp felt that the sport was dying, killed by the betting tax and also revealed that he had been offered £100,000 for the stadium just after the war when greyhound racing was in its heyday.

The site was sold and demolished; it was turned into football pitches initially, before redevelopment into the Greyhound Industrial Estate. The northerly part of the stadium near the viaduct became a Park and Ride car park. The southerly part of the stadium is where the Carpetright building stands today.
