= City Stadium, Norwich =

Former greyhound racing stadium in Norwich, England

- Location: Sprowston Road, Norwich
- Coordinates: 52°39′01″N 1°18′40″E
- Opened: 1939
- Closed: 1971

The City Stadium was a greyhound racing stadium in Sprowston Road, Norwich.

== Origins ==
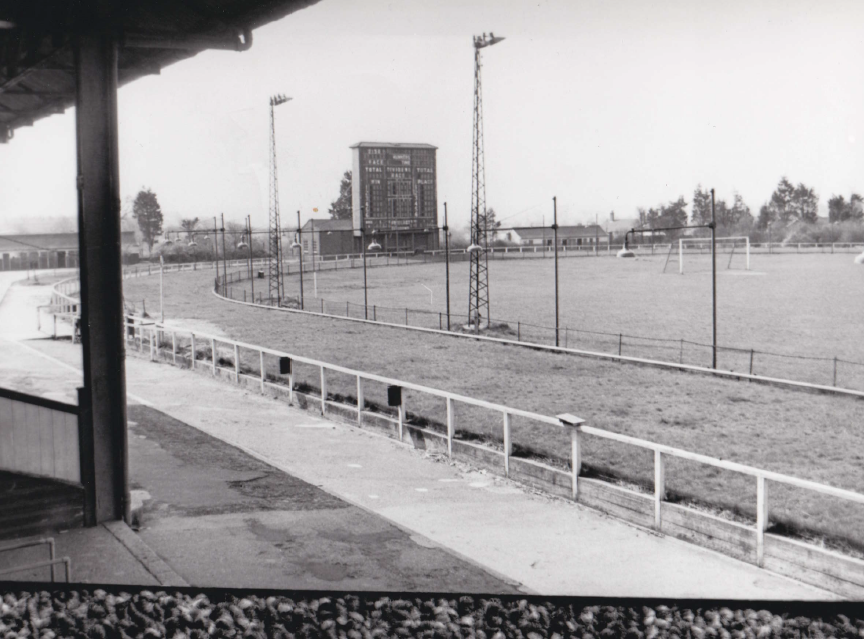
City Stadium, Norwich c.1950

The stadium was built in 1939 north of the centre of Norwich but south of the junction between Sprowston Road and Mousehold Lane and there was a large wood known as Mousehold Heath to the south. The main catchment area was the densely populated housing estate of Sprowston directly to the east.

The stadium was the fourth greyhound track to have brought greyhound racing to the city of Norwich following on from The Firs Stadium, Boundary Park Stadium and Thorpe Greyhound Track.

== Opening ==
Despite the advent of the second World War the large City Stadium opened for business on 25 July 1939. The meeting attracted a crowd of nearly ten thousand and was hailed as a great success by the management. It was declared open by Mr B Cannell, Mr F.Pine, Mr George Attoe, Mr A Holder (Director of Racing) and Mr J H Thornton (publicity manager) and the all-electric totalisator was used. The first ever winner was a greyhound called Grangemore Lad trained by Nicholson winning by four lengths at 5–2.

== History ==
The track characteristics were described as a very handy and sharp little track, 322 yards in circumference (the smallest in Britain) with bends that are well banked and perfect going was ensured throughout the year with the aid of an automatic watering system.

Distances were 400, 555 and 715 yards with an 'Inside McWhirter Trackless' hare system and ray timing and photo finish were also installed. The home straight contained the main grandstand and club with hare control and judges box opposite the winning post. The members club was a spacious modern club room with fully licensed bar and buffet. Subscription was £1, 1 shilling per annum. There were two entrances and car parks, one opposite the main stand on the other side of the track and one between bends three and four. The racing kennels could be found on the fourth bend but the 200 resident kennels were situated on the first bend with the exercising paddocks extending from the kennels to right around the second bend.

Following the closure of Boundary Park in 1962 the Racing Manager (RM) Arthur Rising joined the City Stadium with the existing RM Mr D.Pine becoming General Manager and Director of Racing. Track trainers at the same time were Speechley and Ashley and distances changed to 333, 400 and 555 yards. Racing was held on Tuesday and Saturday evenings.

== Closure ==
The end of the stadium came about as a huge shock, the advance runners list had been advertised for Tuesday 10 August 1971 but the public were informed that the forthcoming Tuesday night racing had been cancelled and the stadium would close with immediate effect. Therefore, the last meeting had been the previous one held on Saturday 7 August 1971. The site had been sold and was soon redeveloped into housing.

== Track records ==
Distance yards	Greyhound	Time	Date
400	Springbow Carrie	23.90	12.07.1966
555	Buhler Drive	34.53	1970
