= 1933 English Greyhound Derby =

- Location: White City Stadium
- Start date: 13 June
- End date: 25 June
- Total prize money: £1,050 (winner)

The 1933 Greyhound Derby took place during June with the final being held on 25 June 1933 at White City Stadium. The winner Future Cutlet received a first prize of £1,050 in front of an attendance of 70,000. Both Future Cutlet and Roaving Loafer were owned by Wembley publican Mr W A Evershed.

== Final result ==
At White City (over 525 yards):

Position	Name of Greyhound	Breeding	Trap	SP	Time	Trainer
1st	Future Cutlet	Mutton Cutlet - Wary Guide	3	6-1	29.80	Sidney Probert (Wembley)
2nd	Beef Cutlet	Mutton Cutlet - Burette	5	2-1	29.81	John Hegarty (White City - Cardiff)
3rd	Wild Woolley	Hautley - Wild Witch	6	6-4f	30.21	Jack Rimmer (White City - Manchester)
4th	Lutwyche	Dick the Rover - Loafer's Colleen	1	100-6	30.37	Stan Biss (West Ham)
5th	Roving Loafer	Deemster - Harino	2	7-1	30.77	Sidney Probert (Wembley)
6th	Deemsters Mike	Deemster - Perdita	4	33-1	31.57	Fred Livesly (Bradford)

=== Distances ===
Short head, 5, 2, 5, 10 (lengths)
The distances between the greyhounds are in finishing order and shown in lengths. From 1927-1950 one length was equal to 0.06 of one second but race times are shown as 0.08 as per modern day calculations.

== Review ==
Defending champion Wild Woolley and Future Cutlet would both return for the 1933 competition and were both expected to go well again. Future Cutlet's half-brother Beef Cutlet (the Laurels and Welsh Greyhound Derby champion) was the third greyhound considered a serious contender. He had recently won the Hunt Cup at Blackpool Greyhound Stadium by eight lengths and actually covered 500 yards in 26.13 sec.

Wild Woolley won his opening heat in 30.14 and Deemsters Mike trained by Fred Livesly took the next heat in 30.35. Future Cutlet was run off the track by Wembley Spring Cup champion Goopy Gear but the klaxon was heard and Goopy Gear was disqualified. Future Cutlet duly qualified from the re-run, behind Silver Seal II in 30.29. Welsh representative Beef Cutlet won by 13 lengths in the fastest first round time of 29.81.

Two semi-finals were now held instead of three and Wild Woolley won the first by 4 lengths from Roving Loafer with Deemsters Mike finishing third. Two days later the second semi-final saw Beef Cutlet win in 30.09 from Future Cutlet who only just held off Lutwyche in a messy race.

In the final Future Cutlet led at the first bend and enjoyed a trouble free run. He built up a clear lead from Wild Woolley, and Deemster Mike, with Beef Cutlet some 4 lengths back in fourth. Future Cutlet maintained a four length lead, but Beef Cutlet showed tremendous back straight pace and passed both Wild Woolley and Deemster Mike. Future Cutlet continued to lead as Beef Cutlet rapidly cut down that lead and on the run to the line they went passed together. Future Cutlet was given the verdict by the stewards, Captain Stanley and Mr Wood. He was the oldest dog ever to win the Derby and made amends for his defeat in the final the previous year.

== See also ==
1933 UK & Ireland Greyhound Racing Year
