= 1933 Irish Greyhound Derby =

Irish greyhound race

- Location: Shelbourne Park
- End date: 2 September

The 1933 Irish Greyhound Derby took place during August and September with the final being held on 2 September 1933 at Shelbourne Park in Dublin.

The 1933 Irish Derby was awarded to Shelbourne Park once again by the Irish Coursing Club (ICC). The Harold's Cross Stadium management were left angered after missing out again on the event. Mr Tynan representing the track had pointed out that the previous year Paddy O’Donoghue had promised that they could hold the event in 1933. I.C.C chairman John Bruton explained that they could not cancel a ruling by the club that had already been made. Tynan stormed out of a meeting with the ICC and Harold's Cross refused to run any classic competitions or their qualifying races in 1933 and threatened to run their own Irish Championship.

The winner Monologue was owned by Luke Maher and bred by John Hughes of Carlow.

== Final result ==
At Shelbourne Park, 2 Sep (over 525 yards):

Position	Name of Greyhound	Breeding	Trap	SP	Time	Trainer
1st	Monologue	Mutton Cutlet - High Force	1	5-4f	30.52	Luke Maher
2nd	Right Incline	Loafer - Pyebridge	2	100-8	30.58	
3rd	Treasure's Hopeful	Town Treasure - Princess Karl	6	8-1	30.66	
unplaced	Mooncoin Captain	Mutton Cutlet - Treaty Bound	5	5-2		
unplaced	Swift Heart	Hero's Heart - Swift Waitress	4	6-1		
unplaced	Lacken Warrior	Wily Warrior - Lacken Island	3	5-1		

=== Distances ===
¾, 1

=== Competition Report ===
In the first semi final Swift Heart defeated Lacken Warrior by 6 lengths in 30.74. The second resulted in Treasure's Hopeful beating Right Incline by half a length in 30.63 and in the third Monologue beat Mooncoin Captain.

In the final Monologue was only in fourth place after breaking from the traps but showed enough pace to take the lead by the first bend. Right Incline finished strongly but could not catch Monologue.

== See also ==
1933 UK & Ireland Greyhound Racing Year
