= Southall Greyhound Stadium =

Greyhound racing stadium

- Location: Havelock Road, Southall, West London
- Coordinates: 51°30′04″N 0°22′26″W
- Opened: 1931
- Closed: 1976

Southall Greyhound Stadium was a greyhound racing stadium on Havelock Road in Southall, West London

== Origins ==
The track was constructed on the north side of Havelock Road and the east side of Warwick Road. The plot of land was directly west of a gravel pit.

== Opening ==
The track opened on 24 October 1931. The racing was independent (not affiliated to the sports governing body the National Greyhound Racing Club). It was known as a flapping track which was the nickname given to independent tracks.

== History ==
The track was described as a large all grass circuit. Race nights were Monday and Friday at 7.30pm with trials held on Tuesday afternoons. Race distances consisted of 270, 450 and 625 yards and the hare system was an 'Inside Sumner'.

Facilities included a licensed club and snack bar on site and a totalisator. There were car parking facilities and on course bookmakers.

== Closure ==
The track closed in December 1976 and was demolished. Later the Havelock Primary School and Nursery was built on the site.
