= Rochester Stadium =

Greyhound racing stadium in Rochester, England

- Location: City Way, Rochester, Kent
- Coordinates: 51°21′35″N 0°30′25″E
- Opened: 1936
- Closed: 1979

Rochester Stadium was a greyhound racing stadium in Rochester, Kent.

== Origins ==
The stadium was constructed in a rural area of Kent right next to a large wood called Warren Wood. A relatively new main road had also been built called the City Way and this led directly past the stadium on its east side.

== Opening ==
The stadium was known as the Rochester and Chatham Sports Stadium when it first hosted greyhound racing on 1 June 1936. When it opened it in 1936 it became the 55th National Greyhound Racing Club licensed track that year. It had a course circumference of 455 yards and was described as a good sized course with long straights but fairly difficult turns proving difficult for wide runners but with a good run-in to the finish. There was an 'Outside Sumner' hare system and race distances of 275, 525, 480 and 700 yards.

Amenities provided by Greater London Stadium (Successors) Ltd included two grandstands (one on the home straight that included a club and another on the back straight), a snack bar on the fourth bend, a stand on the first bend and a tote indicator between the third and fourth bends.

== History ==
A greyhound called Safe Rock won the prestigious Pall Mall Stakes for new Rochester trainer Fred Wilson in 1936. Racing still took place during the war years in the summer daylight hours and in 1943 Ballyhennessy Seal won the 18th Rochester Stakes, his first race in England. In the same year Margaret Hyland became one of the few female trainers to hold a trainers licence and joined the Rochester training ranks.

The stadium was one of the smaller tracks especially for one so close to London but business was profitable and the totalisator turnover peaked in 1946 at £1,282,828.

In 1960 a kennel block at the stadium suffered a terrible fire, which resulted in the death of 24 greyhounds trained by Reg Morley. Morley and his head lad Mr Morton attempted to rescue them and both suffered injuries. Morley was brought out unconscious.

In 1978 John McCririck a Sporting Life journalist took the lead in covering a Rochester greyhound coup that ended in a legal battle and it was not until 1985 that a judge agreed that bookmakers were not liable to pay out on the case.

== Speedway ==
There were speedway racing trials in 1932, and many years later in 1969 when the Rochester Bombers wanted to use the stadium as their home venue.

== Closure ==
In 1979 the stadium closed with little warning after the site had been sold to developers. After racing on 4 October rumours had surfaced regarding a sale, Racing Manager Kevin Barry attempted to get information from one of the directors Michael Rice and company secretary Mrs Webber without success. On Friday 5 October he was told that the company's shares had been sold and a twelve-month contract of greyhound racing had been signed. Then without warning on the Monday 8 October morning he was informed that racing had finished with immediate effect because the site had been sold to developers. The shock closure tarnished the reputation of the company chairman Con Stevens (a major name within the industry) due to the fact that he had not given any notice to the staff and trainers.

== Track records ==
Distance yards	Greyhound	Time	Date	Notes
480	Lazy Loafer	27.50	29.09.1945	National Record
480	Riverdale Heiress	27.52	25.07.1956	
480	Crocket Man	27.48	01.09.1969	
480	Ramblers Jet		1981	
525	Captain Bones	29.97	05.09.1960	
525	Russian Tip	29.72	26.05.1969	
700	Walk On By	41.25	14.09.1964	
700	Arklite	40.53	29.07.1967	
757	Doon Monarch	44.44	18.12.1971	
