= 1950 Irish Greyhound Derby =

- Venue: Shelbourne Park
- Location: Dublin
- End date: 12 August
- Total prize money: £1,000 (winner)

The 1950 Irish Greyhound Derby took place during July and August with the final being held at Shelbourne Park in Dublin on 12 August 1950.

The winner Crossmolina Rambler won £1,000 and was trained by Anthony Meenaghan and owned by Frank Fox and bred by Tadgh Drummond.

== Final result ==
At Shelbourne, 12 August (over 525 yards):

Position	Name of Greyhound	Breeding	Trap	SP	Time	Trainer
1st	Crossmolina Rambler	Tanners Trail - Reney's Delight	1	7-4f	29.70	Anthony Meenaghan
2nd	Deeps Dasher	Model Dasher - Mythical Rose	3	5-1	29.82	A Lockington
3rd	Shady Tree	Mad Tanist - Farloe Music	6	9-2	29.85	Paddy Barry
4th	Clogher McGrath	Tanist - Clogher Cross	4	5-1		Sean Cassidy
5th	Bronze Badge	Regal Major - Black Badge	5	4-1		Paddy O’Brien
6th	Cryhelp Billie	unknown	2	100-8		Andy Metcalfe

=== Distances ===
1½, neck (lengths)

== Competition Report ==
Trainer Bob Burls provided the English challenge with the 1950 Scottish Greyhound Derby champion Behattans Choice and another greyhound called Westend Dasher but faced a tough challenge from leading Irish runners including Sandown Champion and Imperial Dancer the latter trained by Tom Lynch. Imperial Dancer broke the five year old track record in the first round recording a sensational 29.55 sec and Behattans Choice impressed when winning a later heat win. The second round provided many shocks with the elimination of Behattans Choice, Westend Dasher and Imperial Dancer; Sandown Champion was withdrawn lame leaving the competition wide open. During the semi-finals Crossmolina Rambler defeated Deeps Dasher and Shady Tree in a time of 29.86 whilst Clogher McGrath beat Bronze Badge and Cryhelp Billie in 29.72.

Mayo dog Crossmolina Rambler was cheered on by a huge attendance that included hundreds of supporters from the Mayo football side. Crossmolina Rambler had been just behind Deeps Dasher going into the first bend before overtaking the leader and running strongly to win by one and a half lengths. Deeps Dasher held off Shady Tree for second place. Coincidentally the following night Mayo won the All Ireland semi-final and then went on to lift the 1950 All-Ireland Senior Football Championship Final itself.

== See also ==
- 1950 UK & Ireland Greyhound Racing Year
