= Mount Vernon Sports Stadium =

Sports venue in Glasgow, Scotland

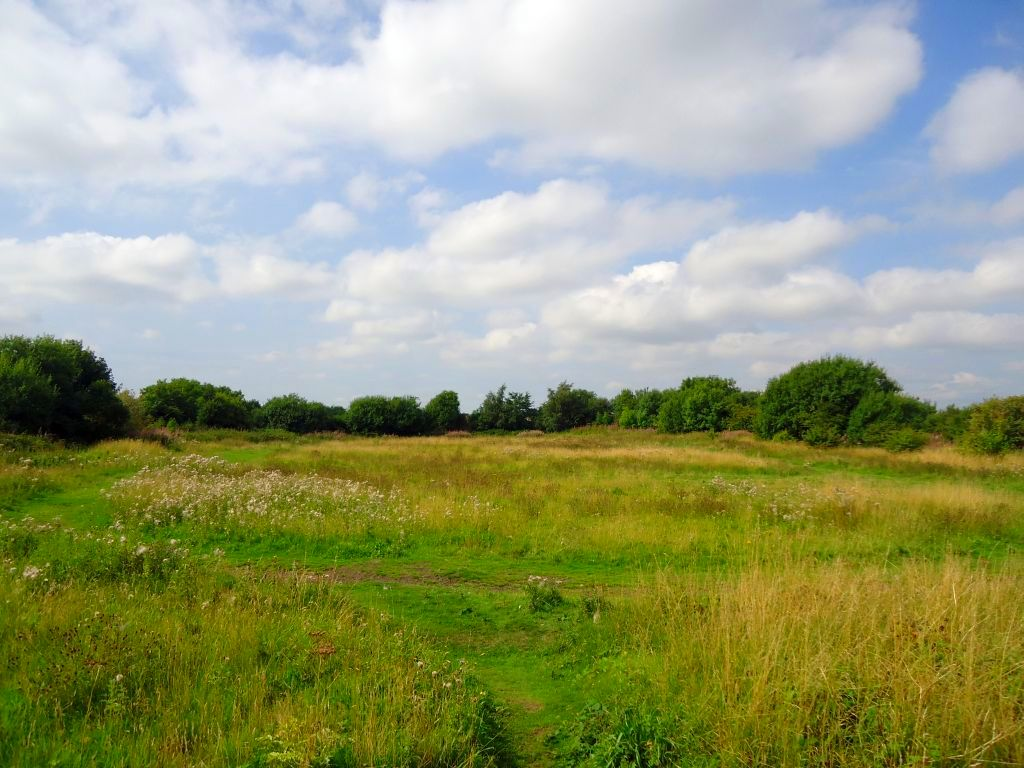
- The derelict former stadium site in 2013
- Interactive map of Mount Vernon Sports Stadium
- Location: Daldowie Road, Mount Vernon, Glasgow, Scotland
- Coordinates: 55°50′31″N 4°07′23″W

Construction
- Opened: 1927
- Closed: 1990

Mount Vernon Sports Stadium was a sports and greyhound racing stadium on Daldowie Road, Mount Vernon, in the south-east of Glasgow, Scotland.

The sports stadium was built on the site of the Daldowie Colliery on the south side of the Argyle railway line after Andrew Beattie of Forest Street, Airdrie gained planning permission from the Lanarkshire council in early 1927.

The build cost over £3,500 and the stadium could accommodate 4,000 spectators. The greyhound racing was independent (unlicensed) and the first race took place on 10 October 1927. Race distances included 260, 450, 620 and 815 yards. The track was a leading independent track and offered prize money levels that matched or surpassed many National Greyhound Racing Club licensed tracks. The leading race events held at Mount Vernon were the Mount Vernon Derby and Mount Vernon St Leger.

The track closed in 1990 and was demolished in 2007 with the site now consisting of grassland sitting next door to a waste recycling centre and a Dogs Trust.
