= West Suffolk Greyhound Stadium =

Greyhound racing stadium

- Interactive map of West Suffolk Greyhound Stadium
- Location: Spring Lane, Bury St Edmunds, Suffolk
- Coordinates: 52°15′10″N 0°42′23″E

Construction
- Opened: 1949
- Closed: 1996

West Suffolk Greyhound Stadium was a greyhound racing stadium on Spring Lane in Bury St Edmunds, Suffolk.

== Origins ==
The stadium was constructed in 1949 on the south side of the London and North Eastern Railway Cambridge, Newmarket and Bury branch line on an area known as Tayfen Meadows which was an actual Meadow. The stadium was accessed from the north end of Spring Lane by passing the Silver Jubilee Secondary School for Girls (now King Edward VI school).

== Opening ==
The stadium was opened on 1 December 1949 by brothers Joby and Dougie Dutton. The greyhound racing was independent (not affiliated to the sport's governing body the National Greyhound Racing Club) and was known as a flapping track which was the nickname given to independent tracks.

== History ==
Racing was held every Thursday and Saturday evening with trial sessions on a Sunday. The track circumference was 440 metres and race distances of 277, 471, 655 and 877 metres were used. The hare system was an 'Inside Sumner' and annual competitions consisted of the Spring and Summer Cup and Magna Carta Stakes. There was car parking for 150 vehicles and 48 kennels on site with ten on-course bookmakers.

== Closure ==
The stadium closed in 1996 and was demolished soon afterwards to make way for the Tayfen Estate. The location today would be the housing on Bulrush Crescent.
