= Pennycross Stadium =

Sports venue in Plymouth, Devon, England

- Interactive map of Pennycross Stadium
- Location: Plymouth
- Coordinates: 50°23′54.298″N 4°8′48.682″W

Construction
- Opened: 1928
- Closed: 1972

Tenant
- Greyhound racing

Pennycross Stadium was a greyhound racing and speedway stadium in north Plymouth, Devon.

== Origins ==
In 1928, southeast of Pennycross village and directly east of the Pennycross vicarage, an area of rural land was identified for a greyhound track in the north of Plymouth. There had been attempts at racing on the Polo Grounds in nearby Roborough and Beacon Park also hosted summer racing but this was the first time a substantial stadium was being constructed.

The venture would cost over £30,000 and take over six months to build before coming to life and the track was one of nineteen that the Greyhound Racing Association (GRA) had a financial interest in.

== Opening ==
The first meeting was held on 28 May 1928 promoted by the Plymouth Greyhound Stadium Ltd company becoming the third venue in Plymouth to experience greyhound racing.

The track circumference was a large 471 yards with race distances of 525 & 725 yards; the hare was a 'Metro-Vickers' with racing being held four times per week on Monday, Wednesday, Friday and Saturday evenings. The stadium could be accessed on a private road that linked to Honicknowle Lane and Ham Drive and facilities included the Pennycross Sports Club for members.

The first winner at Pennycross in a time of 33.4sec was Tabiffa, a 2-1 shot, owned by Miss Wynter. A rehearsal had taken place two nights previously on the Saturday whereby Managing Director Jack Andrew and Racing Manager Mr J A Chapman selected which greyhounds would run on opening night.

== History ==
By 1931 three more venues at Beacon Castle, Devonport and Plymstock Park had all tried the new sport in the Plymouth area. However Pennycross was the only track to survive beyond 1934. Speedway also began at Pennycross in 1931 Western Speedways Ltd promoted the dirt track racing, with the opening meeting being a challenge match against Exeter on 13 June 1931. The general manager of the stadium Freddie Hore signed Australian Bert Spencer as the first star to ride at Plymouth.

Although racing under National Greyhound Racing Club rules when the track first opened it is believed that the track became independent (unaffiliated to a governing body) sometime before or during the Second World War. Pennycross Stadium conducted greyhound racing meetings throughout the war under the management of J. Chapman.

Totalisator turnover in 1946 was £1,020,472 during its peak.

The stadium had residential housing to its south and as the years passed this increased in size and began to close in around the track on the east and then north. During the sixties the west followed suit resulting in a strange situation where the stadium looked out of place completely surrounded by housing. Pennycross stadium nearly disappeared itself in 1961 after being chosen as the new site for a boys school but it gained a reprieve and an extended lease.

In the late 1960s the track continued to race on Wednesday and Saturday nights at 7.30pm, there were two licensed bars and five buffet bars. The track was all-grass with distances of 275, 300, 500, 525, 750 & 800 yards and an inside hare system.

== Closure ==
The stadium began to become extremely run down with little investment put into it, the speedway stopped and eventually in November 1972 the greyhounds ceased. The stadium was demolished and became industrial units and then housing. The site today is the Cherry Tree Gardens housing development on Pennycross Close.
