= Coundon Greyhound Stadium =

Greyhound racing stadium in Ireland

- Interactive map of Coundon Greyhound Stadium
- Location: Coundon, County Durham
- Coordinates: 54°39′42″N 1°38′23″W

Construction
- Opened: 1938
- Closed: 1960s?

Coundon Greyhound Stadium was a greyhound racing stadium situated off the B6287, in Coundon, County Durham.

== Origins ==
The track was constructed in 1936, on fields to the south side of the Bishop's Park Colliery off the Wharton Road/Church Road (B6287 today).

== Opening ==
Greyhound racing started on Saturday 1 October 1938, serving as entertainment for the Jawblades Pit miners.

== History ==
The racing was independent (not affiliated to the National Greyhound Racing Club) and annual totalisator during 1947 was £127,708.

== Closure ==
The stadium continued to trade until it closed during the 1960s, but the exact date of closure is unknown. It remained disused for many years afterwards before being demolished and turned into farmland, with some of the stadium buildings being converted into use for the High Meadows Farm.
