= City Stadium, Bradford =

Stadium in West Yorkshire, England

- Location: Bradford, West Yorkshire
- Coordinates: 53°47′39″N 1°46′37″W
- Opened: 1932
- Closed: 1965

City Stadium, Bradford was a greyhound track in Bradford, West Yorkshire.

== Origins and opening ==
The City Stadium was constructed in the middle of a busy industrial area east of Brownroyd Street off the main tramway route of Legrams Lane. A railway line ran adjacent to the eastern side that carried the goods from the mills to other parts of Britain and the main industry in the immediate area was textile with dye works being particularly prominent around the stadium. Access to the track was by virtue of a bridge (if arriving from the west) over the railway track and then a lane that ran alongside the railway line (also used by those coming from the east and south).

The City Stadium opened on Monday 15 August 1932 five years after the opening of the Greenfield Stadium and the main stand which backed onto the railway line and Brownroyd Street featured tote facilities and seating with further terracing and kennels on the south side by Legrams Lane.

== History ==
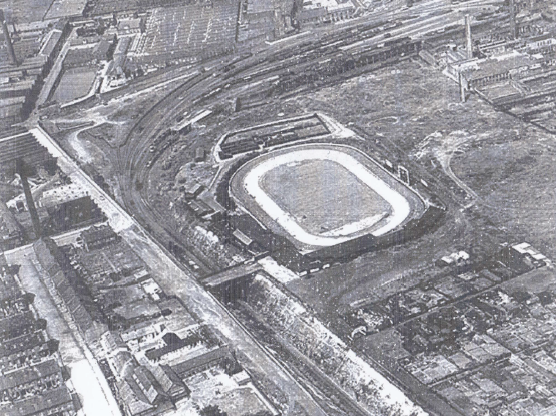
The City Stadium in Bradford c.1950

The City Stadium was originally affiliated to the British Greyhound Track Control Society (BGTCS), one of the two organisations governing the sport and the rival to the National Greyhound Racing Club (NGRC). When the BGTCS disbanded in 1935 the stadium owners the (City Greyhound and Sports Club (Bradford) Ltd) became independent (unaffiliated).

Despite basic facilities the stadium was selected by Romulus films to be the backdrop of several scenes in the hugely successful 1958 film called Room at the Top. Racing in the 1960s was mainly handicaps over 470 yards on Wednesday & Saturday afternoons.

== Closure ==
In 1961 the effect of the Betting and Gaming Act 1960 which allowed the opening of betting shops impacted the City Stadium with attendances and tote turnover being affected badly. An attempt to fight back was made with the owners introducing various ideas (including post racing card games) but a serious fire in 1963 caused £50,000 worth of damage and the track never recovered.

Greyhound racing came to an end on the Wednesday afternoon of 30 October 1965. For a short time cycling events still took place on a constructed cycling track described as a velodrome but it was soon replaced by a large warehouse. The area today remains largely industrial and the greyhound stadium would have been where the large Federal Mogul buildings are located. The lane that ran alongside the long-gone railway line is now the road leading to Federal Mogul called 'Greyhound Drive'.
