= Belmont Stadium =

Greyhound racing venue in County Durham, UK

- Location: Broomside Lane, Belmont, County Durham
- Coordinates: 54°47′13″N 1°31′18″W
- Opened: 1940
- Closed: 1969

Belmont Stadium was a greyhound racing stadium in Broomside Lane, Belmont, County Durham.

== Origins ==
The track was constructed on the south side of Broomside Lane and east of the cemetery in 1940.

== Opening ==
Greyhound racing started on Saturday 13 July 1940, serving as entertainment for the mining community from Broomside Colliery and the Carrville residents.

== History ==
The racing was independent (not affiliated to the National Greyhound Racing Club). Race distances included 290 yards and a totalisator was in operation. The stadium suffered temporary closures during the war. In 1954 the track was the inspiration for a 1954 film called The Gay Dog.

== Closure ==
The stadium continued to trade until 1969 before closing and being turned into housing.

== Totalisator Returns ==
Year	£
1946	23,181
1947	27,993
1948	25,919

Year	£
1949	43,250
1950	31,161
1951	14,920
