= Aldershot Stadium =

Former multi-use stadium

- Interactive map of Aldershot Stadium
- Location: Oxenden Road, Tongham, near Farnham, Surrey
- Coordinates: 51°14′21.5″N 0°44′08.6″W

Construction
- Opened: circa.1935
- Closed: 1992

Aldershot Stadium was a greyhound racing, stock car racing and speedway stadium on Oxenden Road in Tongham, near Farnham, Surrey.

== Origins ==
The stadium was constructed on land west of the Oxenden Road and east of the Blackwater River.

== Opening ==
A seven-year lease was granted to the Aldershot Greyhound Racing Ltd in 1935 but on 24 November 1939, the stadium advertised a grand re-opening, which indicated that it had closed sometime between 1935 and 1939.

The racing was independent (not affiliated to the sports governing body the National Greyhound Racing Club). It was known as a flapping track, which was the nickname given to independent tracks. The venue covered 10 acres and had a capacity of 3,000 in 1942.

== Greyhound racing ==
In December 1942, the managing director of Aldershot Greyhound Stadium Ltd, Ernest Robert Nance-Kivell Netcott, applied for betting facilities under the Betting and Lotteries Act 1934.

During the 1950s and 1960s racing was held on Wednesday and Friday evenings at 7.30pm. The track had a circumference of 400 yards with an 'Inside Sumner' hare system and race distances of 275, 500, 675 and 900 yards. Facilities included a licensed bar, tea bar and hot dog bar and totalisator. The track was grass straights and sanded bends.

In 1964, the site (now listed as 20 acres) was marked as a site for housing by the Minitry of Housing but the Borough Council submitted objections, asking for it to be used for industrial development.

During the 1980s the facilities were listed as three stands (one glass fronted and two covered. race distances were now 254, 462, 626 and 842 metres and the main races were the Smokey Joe Stakes and the March Hare Stakes.

== Speedway ==
Speedway took place from 1950 until 1960.

== Stock cars ==
During 1973 the stadium was taken over by Spedeworth International Ltd and stock car racing was a regular fixture. There was also a weekly Sunday market.

== Closure ==
The stadium closed on 30 October 1992 making way for the new A331 road. The loss of the stadium was seen as a blow to Independent racing because it was one of the more professional tracks in this type of racing.
