= Darnall Stadium =

Greyhound racing venue in Darnall, England

- Location: Darnall, east Sheffield, South Yorkshire
- Coordinates: 53°23′02″N 1°24′57″W
- Opened: 1927
- Closed: 1964

Darnall Stadium was a greyhound racing stadium in Darnall, east Sheffield, South Yorkshire.

== Origins ==
The Darnall Wellington Cricket and Football Ground (Wellington Grounds) was built on a plot of land on the south side of the London and North Eastern Railway at the turn of the 20th century. It hosted cricket and football matches including Roundel F.C. competing in the Hatchard Cup in 1900. This ground is not to be confused with the Darnall Cricket and Football Ground which was found nearby on the north side of the railway line and was used by The Wednesday Cricket Club (founded in 1820). This original ground made way for housing around the same time that the Darnall Wellington Ground was built.

The first greyhound track to be constructed in the city of Sheffield would be called Darnall Stadium. The site chosen was the Wellington Grounds which was partly surrounded by garden allotments at the time of the greyhound track construction. The stadium would be accessed from Poole Road with the eastern side of the stadium adjacent to allotments and James Street. Directly to the north was a metal wire rope works and railway line and to the east was another large collection of allotments that would eventually be converted into the Parkway market.

== Opening ==
The opening night was Monday 23 May starting at 7.30pm. Trials had previously taken place to classify the runners into relevant races and the local press were excited by the fact that a greyhound called Latto the 1923 Waterloo Cup winner had sired some of the greyhounds due to take part in the event. There were some reservations about the fact that it was coursing greyhounds that were expected to take to the new oval form of racing but it had already been successful at the new Greyhound Racing Association tracks.

The Darnall Working Men's Club band started proceedings at 6.30pm before a six race card began. The manager was F Williamson and the A J Detheridge from Bristol was brought in as the judge. There were over 100 bookmakers and between 5-6 thousand spectators who witnessed a greyhound called Mission win the first ever race at 3-1 odds finishing two lengths clear of the field. It was also reported that the electric hare "caused bewilderment and then keen interest as the crowd became thrilled by the new contraption".

== History ==
Darnall owned by the Associated Greyhound Racecourse Ltd (AGR Ltd) had a rival when in 1929 Owlerton Stadium was constructed. AGR Ltd opened a second track called the Burnley Greyhound Stadium in September 1927 and also secured the lease at Craven Park, Hull before going bankrupt during 1931.

Darnall continued to trade under a company called the Darnall Greyhound Racecourse Company Ltd and the totalisator turnover figures increased steadily throughout the war years up until a peak in 1946.

The track itself was 393 yards in circumference with distances of 475, 530 and 650 yards behind an 'Inside McWhirter' hare system. There was a large covered stand and club with enclosures on the home straight, on the first bend was the club veranda and then the totalisator board, tote control and terracing all the way round to the back straight. At the end of the terracing there was another club then more terracing and the very large South Covered Stand that was constructed around the third bend until it met east terrace and offices.

Three sets of kennels existed, the racing kennels and small paddock were found behind the first bend, the isolation kennels well behind the second bend and finally the 120 resident kennels, cook house, stores and four acre training paddocks stretched along the south of the stadium behind the South Covered Stand. Additional rest kennels with a head trainer were situated 12 miles from the track at Loyal Trooper Farm, South Anston.

Darnall failed to match the larger Owlerton Stadium in terms of attendances and turnover and the independent track Hyde Park Greyhound Stadium also contributed to healthy competition in Sheffield. R Randall was replaced as Racing Manager by V Holland in the mid-1950s.

In 1959 Come To Johnny trained by Jack Brennan won the Northern 700 and in 1962 the Ebor Stakes was won by Cushmine Snob (A Dryhurst).

== Closure ==
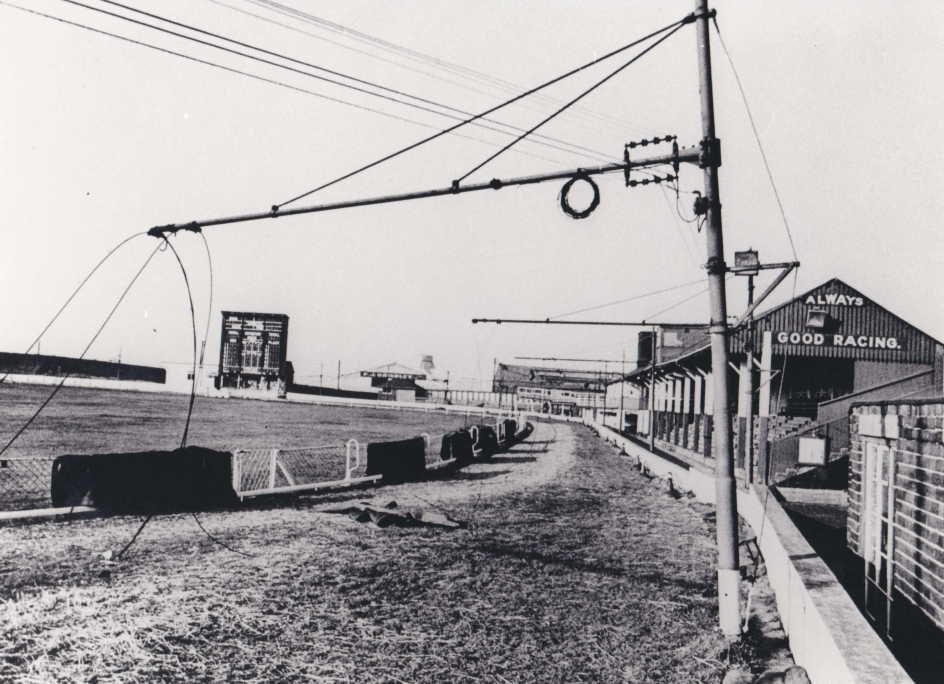
Darnall Greyhound Stadium in Sheffield, shortly after closure c.1965

A decline in attendances partly due to the Betting and Gaming Act 1960 led to the track closing in 1964. The track was demolished and a road called Acres Hill Lane was built to meet an extended Poole Road on the area that would have been the northern part of track today. Later industrial units were constructed encompassing the southern part of the track.

== Track records ==
Distance yards	Greyhound	Time	Date
470	Long Rally		07.1946
470	Hilarity	26.98	25.08.1948
530	Belle of Killarney	29.91	03.07.1948
650	Camp Bugler	37.81	16.06.1945
650	Clady Border	37.73	01.07.1946
480 H	Lone Legion	28.70	28.08.1939
