= White City Stadium (Nottingham) =

Greyhound racing and motorcycle speedway stadium in Nottingham

- Location: Trent Lane, Nottingham
- Field size: 457 yards

Construction
- Opened: 1928
- Renovated: 1933
- Closed: 1970

Tenants
- Greyhound and speedway racing

White City Stadium (Nottingham) was a greyhound racing and motorcycle speedway stadium in Trent Lane, Nottingham.

== Origins ==
In the late 1920s several plots of land opposite the Nottingham Corporation Sewage Works pumping station and next door to a football ground in Trent Lane were identified and acquired as a perfect site for a speedway and greyhound stadium.

== Olympic Grounds ==
Speedway arrived first on 28 July 1928 when the Nottingham Tornado Motorcycle Club put in a grass track but plans for greyhound racing had been discussed in early 1927 and the Greyhound Racing Association (GRA) ensured that they had a financial interest in the stadium.

In 1929 a dirt track was laid down by the Olympic Speedway Ltd over the grass track and the stadium was known as the Olympic Grounds but speedway came to an end during the 1931 season. A company called 'The Greyhounds (Nottingham) Ltd' held greyhound meetings over the distance of 525 yards and the racing continued until September 1932 before the venue closed.

== New stadium ==
White City (Nottingham) Ltd constructed a new stadium, including three new grandstands, a greyhound track and speedway circuit in 1933 replacing the original Olympic Grounds. On Saturday 24 June 1933 the Duchess of Portland opened the stadium under the National Greyhound Racing Club (NGRC) rules of racing in the presence of 1,500 people.

The Lord Mayor and Lady Mayoress of Nottingham were also present during the opening night in which all proceeds were donated to the Harlow Wood Hospital and St Dunstan's Home. Seven races over 502 yards were held with the first-ever winner being the 5–2 shot Dragwell Queen trained by McDougall in a time of 31.31. The fastest time of the night went to the Burke trained Well Out in a time of 29.24 sec. McDougall scored three winners and Burke had two successes along with another trainer Bridgwood.

== History ==
Apart from the 457 yard circumference greyhound track itself a main double level grandstand was built on the home straight featuring club and tote facilities. There were two more additional stands to the left and right of the main grandstand and as the patrons entered the stadium from the new car park they would pass the resting kennels and to the left of these (behind the fourth bend) there were another 200 centrally heated brick resident stadium kennels.

Within a couple of months of opening a busy schedule of racing was held on Monday, Tuesday, Friday and Saturday nights at 7.45pm. After the war speedway came to an end and the track was concreted over and used as a parade area for the greyhounds as business boomed. Totalisator turnover in 1946 was £1,549,732. The principal event was the St Dunstan's Trophy over 525 yards and distances by were 362 and 525 yards behind an 'Inside Sumner' hare system and it was not long before undersoil heating was also installed.

During the 1950s the racing manager, Mr B Pash, was replaced by Mr F Sharpe, and controversy ensued in 1957 over a situation that involved the owner and general manager, 80-year-old Elias Jolley. Jolley had to stand trial after being accused of widespread rigging of tote odds and destroying evidence, but by the mid-1960s Mr Jolley took a back seat with general and racing manager Mr F W Shaw, ensuring that the racing was conducted correctly.

Resident trainers in the 1960s included Frank Heald, Bill Savage and Wilf Flint. The stadium owned a significant number of the greyhounds that provided the graded racing strength, handicap races were also very popular. Harry Bish was Racing Manager at the end of the decade.

Ben Parsons had a spell as a trainer at the track, which resulted in a major open-race competition win when Cash For Dan, won the 1969 BBC Television Trophy. It was first and only major achievement for the track.

== Closure ==
In 1970 Ernest Jolley died, which resulted in a sequence of events that led to the sale of the stadium to property developers for £110,000. It ceased trading on 12 September 1970 but the well-known veterinary surgeon Paddy Sweeney made an attempt to take the stadium out of the hands of the developers for £125,000. Sweeney was acting for the newly formed Greyhound Council of Great Britain, but the efforts failed. The seven-acre site was bought by a Kent company for £110,000 and redeveloped into warehouses. The site today is where Little Tennis Street stands.

== Track records ==
Distance yards	Greyhound	Time	Date
362	Bold Tan	20.37	12.09.1946
362	Cheerful Catapult	19.90	03.07.1958
525	Don Gipsey	29.38	31.05.1947
525	Feakles Wish	29.12	17.06.1965
525	Cladius	28.83	10.05.1966
715	Cash For Dan	40.70	1970
