= Barrmill Stadium =

Sports venue in Galston, Scotland

Barrmill Stadium Galston Greyhound Stadium
- Location: Barrmill Road, Galston, East Ayrshire, Scotland
- Coordinates: 55°36′07″N 4°22′30″W

Barrmill Stadium, formerly Galston Greyhound Stadium, is a football ground and former greyhound stadium in Barrmill Road, Galston, East Ayrshire, Scotland.

The football ground is situated on the south bank of the River Irvine and used by Galston United AFC. The stadium was formerly a greyhound track known as Galston Greyhound Stadium and the circuit was 350 yards in circumference. The racing was independent (unlicensed) and started on 9 June 1933. Race distances were 280 and 450 yards with an inside hare. The schedule of Thursday and Saturday night racing came to an end in 1967.
