= Chester Greyhound Stadium =

Greyhound racing stadium in England

- Interactive map of Chester Greyhound Stadium
- Location: Sealand Road, west Chester, Cheshire
- Coordinates: 53°11′46″N 2°54′53″W

Construction
- Opened: 3 August 1935
- Closed: 10 January 1987

Chester Greyhound Stadium was a greyhound racing stadium on Sealand Road, west Chester, Cheshire. It is not to be confused with Sealand Road football stadium.

== Origins and opening ==
The stadium was constructed on the north side of Sealand Road almost next door to the football stadium found on its east side.

== History ==
The first meeting was held on Saturday 3 August 1935, and was opened by Alderman Sheriff W. H.Ebrey. The spectators could choose to view the racing from the County Stand, the Grandstand or Silver ring. The County stand was the most expensive at 2s 6d. The Chester Greyhound Racing Association Ltd owned the stadium and was led by Chairman H. Deverill.

Initially racing was every Monday, Friday and Saturday at 7.45 p.m. with a totalisator available. It closed temporarily from September 1939 until reopening on 14 October 1939 and regularly raced throughout wartime. In 1946 the track remained under the control of the Chester Greyhound Racing Association Ltd.

As the racing continued, it was held on Monday and Saturday night, with the track circumference being 440 yards. Race distances were 530 and 755 yards and races consisted of mainly five dogs and using an 'Inside Sumner' hare system. The racing was independent (unaffiliated to a governing body).

== Closure ==
The site closed on 10 January 1987 and was later demolished to make way for a large retail park. The nearby park and retail park are now called Greyhound Park and Greyhound Retail Park.
