= Granvue Greyhound Stadium =

Greyhound racing stadium in Stevenston, Scotland

- Location: Stevenston, North Ayrshire, Scotland
- Coordinates: 55°38′12″N 4°45′43″W
- Opened: 1933
- Closed: 1967

Granvue Greyhound Stadium was a greyhound racing stadium in Stevenston, North Ayrshire, Scotland.

The stadium was built in 1933 and accessed on the south side of Hillside Street. It was constructed on the old Auchenharvie Colliery. The greyhound racing was independent (unaffiliated to a governing body) and started on 23 June 1933. The centre of the track was used for scrambling races by the Stevenston Motorcycle club. It closed in 1967 and is now the site of the Auchenharvie golf driving range.
