= Halfway Greyhound Track =

Greyhound racing venue in Kingskerswell, England

- Location: Torquay Road, Kingskerswell, Devon
- Coordinates: 50°29′28″N 3°34′35″W
- Opened: 1933
- Closed: 1971

The Halfway Greyhound Track was a greyhound racing stadium on Torquay Road, Kingskerswell, between Newton Abbot and Torquay in Devon.

== Origins ==
A greyhound track was constructed in 1932 on the east side of the Great Western Railway Torquay and Dartmouth branch line and the west side of the Torquay Road. The name derives from the Half Way Cottages and Half Way Inn that were located on its east side. It is not known where the name Half Way originates but could be because Kingskerswell is halfway between Torquay and Newton Abbot.

== Opening ==
The track opened during February 1933 and traded through the war. The racing was independent (not affiliated to the sports governing body the National Greyhound Racing Club).

== History ==
The venue was listed as being able to hold 500 spectators and in 1947 had a totalisator turnover of £157,233 which was a large turnover for a small track.

In the 1960s the track was all-grass and raced five dog races over 220 and 530 yards and had an inside rail hare system.

== Closure ==
The track raced until November 1971 with land being sold for redevelopment. The housing on the site today is called Stadium Drive and the Halfway Inn is now a private dwelling. A newer pub called the Hare and Hounds is situated immediately next door to the former Halfway Inn.
