= Doncaster Greyhound Track =

Greyhound racing stadium in Doncaster, England

Doncaster Greyhound Stadium
- Interactive map of Doncaster Greyhound Stadium
- Location: York Road, Doncaster
- Coordinates: 53°31′56″N 1°09′41″W

Construction
- Opened: 1928
- Closed: 1986

Tenants
- Greyhound racing Doncaster Stallions

The Doncaster Greyhound Track was a greyhound racing stadium in Doncaster. It was sometimes incorrectly referred to as Sprotbrough Greyhound Track, due to its location near the Sprotbrough Road.

It is not to be confused with the current Doncaster Greyhound Stadium near Stainforth which for many years operated as Stainforth Greyhounds until adopting the Doncaster name after the original stadium closed in 1986.

== Origins and Opening ==
In 1928 Sprotbrough west of Doncaster was another site where a colliery existed and as was the trend at the time greyhound tracks popped up wherever collieries existed. The track on Newlands Drive, off the York Road at the back of Regent Grove was opened on 14 April 1928 by the Mansfield Greyhound Racecourse Co.

During the first year of trading as a licensed track they were banned from National Greyhound Racing Club (NGRC) racing following the refusal to comply with the NGRC stewards instructions.

== History ==
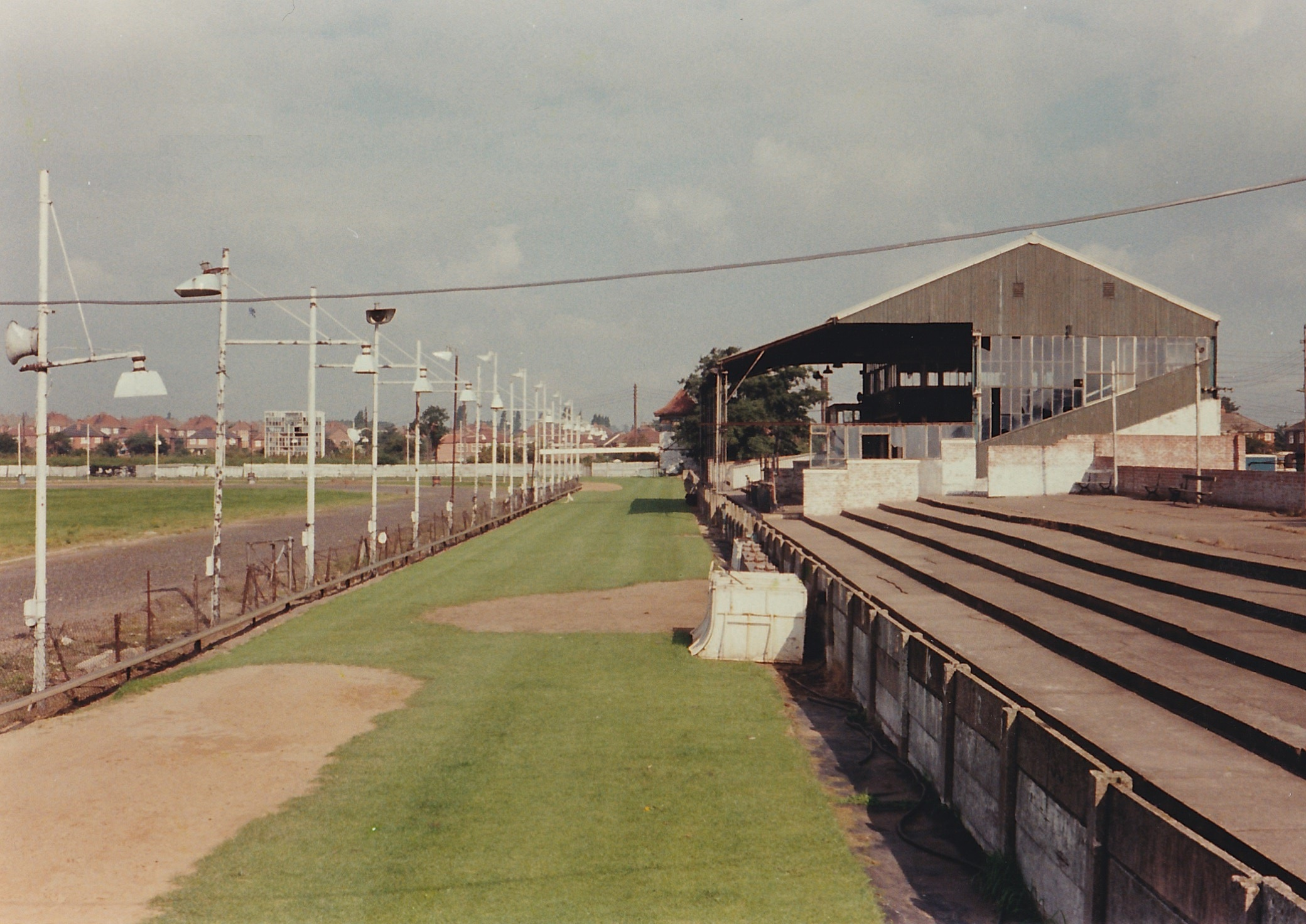
Doncaster Stadium c.1970

Throughout the years the track would switch between fully licensed affiliation and independent status (unaffiliated to a governing body) but would boast an English Greyhound Derby finalist in 1945. The greyhound Lilacs Luck (winner of the Irish Greyhound Derby) had been put with trainer Mr R Jones and he steered the blue brindle to runner up behind Mondays News. A year later he also won the Wembley Gold Cup.

In 1947 the tote turnover was a healthy £147,357 when still licensed by the NGRC. The track would become independent again in the fifties and would not return to NGRC licensed racing again. From the early 1950s the track was owned by local bookmaker Charlie Bint and had a fully licensed casino on site until licensing laws changed in the late 1960s.In the 1970s the stadium also promoted speedway (Doncaster Stallions & Doncaster Dragons) as well as stock car, hot rod and banger racing. The refusal of permanent planning permission led to the sale in 1976 to the Hawkins family.

In the 1950s, 1960s and 1970s racing was held on Tuesday and Saturday evenings at 7.30pm. The circumference was 487 yards and was described as a galloping track because of the size. Distances were set at 300, 410, 525 and 765 yard handicaps and 335, 555 and 800 yards level break. Annual events included the Lincoln Sweepstakes, Leger Sweepstakes, Dennison Trophy and Rose Bowl Sweepstakes. The track had its own well for watering the grass and they would have an intertrack competitions with Stanley Greyhound Stadium. And in 1975 held The Festival of Greyhound Racing which attracted huge sponsorship and national participation. The Bint family, led in the main by Mrs Sue Bint, were heavily involved in greyhound welfare and both housed and re-homed hundreds of retired greyhounds during their time at the stadium.

In 1976 the track was purchased by the Hawkins family (Northern Sports Ltd) who would later own Oxford Stadium and Ramsgate Stadium. In 1980 there were still grass straights and the distances were over 301, 275, 480, 507 and 700 metres. Racing was on Tuesday and Friday nights and an inside hare was used.

== Rugby league ==
The stadium was the first home of Doncaster R.L.F.C. between 1951 and 1953.

== Closure ==
The site was demolished in 1986 and today is the area covered by 'Clearwell Croft' and 'The Leas'.
