= Hyde Park Greyhound Stadium =

Sports venue in Sheffield, England

- Location: Manor Oaks Road, Sheffield, South Yorkshire.
- Coordinates: 53°22′56″N 1°27′04″W
- Opened: 1933
- Closed: 1980

Hyde Park Greyhound Stadium was a greyhound racing stadium on Manor Oaks Road in Sheffield, South Yorkshire, England.

== Origins ==
A track was constructed in 1933 on St Johns Road, north of Manor Oaks Road in an area known as Park Hill at the time. Previously the site had been the Hyde Park Cricket Ground followed by the Hyde Park Drill Ground and then the Hyde Park Volunteer Ground.

== Opening ==
The greyhound racing started on the 1 April 1933.

== History ==
There were two large stands and amenities included a sizeable members social club and snack bar. Racing was held on Friday and Saturday nights at 7.30pm. The track itself was a small circumference of 300 yards enabling distances of 200, 375, 525 and 700 yards. The five dog racing was a mixture of handicap races and level breaks racing with an 'Inside Sumner' hare system in use.

Many of the greyhounds that raced at the track were company owned and came from their breeding kennels at Hatfield Woodhouse Farm. The same management called Hyde Park Greyhounds Ltd ran the track from when it opened into the 1970s and was one of the first tracks in the country to convert to grass straights and sanded bends instead of all-grass just after the Second World War.

The racing was independent (not affiliated to the sports governing body the National Greyhound Racing Club) and was known as a flapping track which was the nickname given to independent tracks. It struggled to compete with the much larger Darnall Stadium and Owlerton Stadium but totalisator turnover peaked in 1946 at £625,084.

Annual events included the Tenants Trophy and Coopers Trophy.

== Closure ==
The track closed in April 1980 when the site was converted to housing called Manor Oaks Gardens.
