= Blackpool Squires Gate Greyhound Stadium =

Former sports venue

- Interactive map of Blackpool Squires Gate; Greyhound Stadium
- Location: Blackpool, Lancashire, England
- Coordinates: 53°46′40″N 3°02′45″W

Construction
- Opened: 1933
- Closed: 1937

Blackpool Squires Gate Greyhound Stadium was a greyhound track in Blackpool, Lancashire, England. It is not to be confused with the Blackpool St Annes Greyhound Stadium that was nearby but to the north.

== Origins ==
The Clifton Park racecourse had been relocated in 1911 to a large acreage of land south of Blackpool and north of St Anne's-on Sea. It was expected to provide Blackpool with horse racing for the foreseeable future with an impressive grandstand situated on the south side of Squires Gate Lane and 144 stables boxes located south by the Blackpool golf links. To the east of the racecourse was the Squires Gate airfield used for public entertainment.

The planned future for the racecourse was cut short because of overspending on construction and high prize money married with the struggle to attract good fields that saw a reduction in attendances. Receivers were appointed as the company went into liquidation. The site was requisitioned by the King's Lancashire Military from 1916 to 1919 and used as a convalescent hospital for the First World War wounded. The airfield owners took over the site with the adjoining huts being demolished to make way for the aerodrome but the grandstand and stables remained. The grandstand continued to serve as a rehabilitation centre until 1924 before being given to the Lancashire school of aviation.

== Greyhound racing ==
=== Construction ===
In July 1932, Leo Craven MD of Blackpool Greyhound and Racecourse Ltd Company, purchased a portion of the 140 acres of land next to the grandstand. A five-month construction project was planned and around the same time the aerodrome was purchased by the West Coast Aero Club hoping to provide a service to the Isle of Man.

The stands that made up the outside part of the grandstand required considerable refurbishment and an oval track and sporting arena was constructed inside what was the old horse racing course. The new Stadium Club and adjoining Aero Club were equipped with offices, lounges and refreshment facilities.

=== Opening night ===
The course was very unusual in shape with an extraordinary 500 yard straight in front of the grandstand and the more standard oval circuit next to it. It resembled modern day Towcester Greyhound Stadium. Racing got underway on 7 April 1933 featuring a £500 prize handicap competition over 550 yards, (some of the classic races offered less at the time). The Chairman of the company was Col. C.J.M.Thornhill who accompanied H Leo Craven Sr. and Jr. in opening the stadium. The first ever winner was Curious Mickey who win the first race in 30.72secs. The second race was a heat of the handicap competition and featured a London dog called Ocean Brawn who had arrived by aeroplane the previous day and was then well beaten. The first ever 500 yard straight race on the same evening was won by Heswall Warrior in 27.57sec. The famous Beef Cutlet set a world record time for 500 yards on the straight some time later recording 26.13sec.

=== Closure ===
Two factors led to the quick demise of the track, the first was that the oval track was too far away from the grandstand and public viewing, the 500 yard straight actually hindered the main action. Secondly the St Annes greyhound track to the north had already been established for six years before Squires Gate and maintained its attendances.

The greyhound racing ended after just four years in 1937. In contrast the West Coast Aero Club thrived buying more land on the Clifton Estate to expand. At the outbreak of World War Two the Air Ministry gained control of the site before becoming a commercial airport.

The exact site of the grandstand would have been the car parking for the hotel and terminal and for the track it would have been the main terminal itself.

=== Track records ===
Metres	Greyhound	Time	Date	Notes
500y straight	Beef Cutlet	26.87	12 May 1933	Blackpool Hunt Cup semi finals
