= Newington, Thanet =

Suburb of Ramsgate, Kent, England

Coordinates: 51.3460°N 1.3917°E

Newington
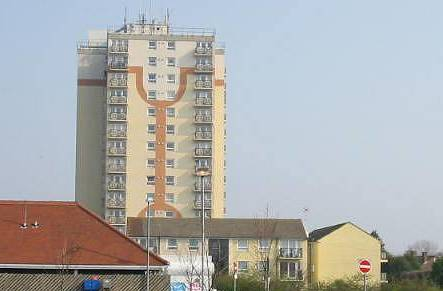
- Staner Court

- Location within Kent
- Population: 5,044 (2011.Ward)
- OS grid reference: TR365665
- District: Thanet
- Shire county: Kent
- Region: South East
- Country: England
- Sovereign state: United Kingdom
- Post town: Ramsgate
- Postcode district: CT12
- Dialling code: 01843
- Police: Kent
- Fire: Kent
- Ambulance: South East Coast
- UK Parliament: East Thanet

Newington is a suburb in the west of the town of Ramsgate, on the eastern tip of Kent, England.

== History ==
Ramsgate Borough Council developed the Newington Estate in the late 1940s to replace housing lost in World War II. Residents of the estate crowdfunded St Christopher's Church which was dedicated in 1955.

== Demography ==
Newington compared
2011 UK Census	Newington ward	Thanet District	England
Population	5,044	126,702	49,138,831
Foreign born	2.6%	5.1%	9.2%
White	93.1%	97.7%	90.9%
Asian	0.70%	0.9%	4.6%
Black	0.2%	0.3%	2.3%
Christian	67.8%	73.6%	71.7%
Muslim	0.3%	0.5%	3.1%
Hindu	0%	0.2%	1.1%
No religion	21.7%	15.9%	14.6%
Unemployed	6.5%	4.4%	3.3%
Retired	13.2%	17.5%	13.5%

At the 2001 UK census, the Newington electoral ward had a population of 5,009. The ethnicity was 98.8% white, 0.8% mixed race, 0.1% Asian, 0.2% black and 0.1% other. The place of birth of residents was 97.4% United Kingdom, 0.3% Republic of Ireland, 0.8% other Western European countries, and 1.5% elsewhere. Religion was recorded as 67.8% Christian, 0.1% Buddhist, 0% Hindu, 0.1% Sikh, 0.1% Jewish, and 0.3% Muslim. 21.7% were recorded as having no religion, 0.2% had an alternative religion and 9.8% did not state their religion.

The economic activity of residents aged 16–74 was 32.4% in full-time employment, 13.2% in part-time employment, 4% self-employed, 6.5% unemployed, 2.5% students with jobs, 3.2% students without jobs, 13.2% retired, 12.3% looking after home or family, 8.9% permanently sick or disabled and 3.9% economically inactive for other reasons. The industry of employment of residents was 20.4% retail, 17.7% manufacturing, 10% construction, 8.7% real estate, 11.9% health and social work, 6.8% education, 8.8% transport and communications, 3.2% public administration, 5.2% hotels and restaurants, 1.1% finance, 1.5% agriculture and 4.7% other. Compared with national figures, the ward had a relatively high proportion of workers in retail, construction, transport and communications. There were a relatively low proportion in finance, public administration and real estate. Of the ward's residents aged 16–74, 4.8% had a higher education qualification or the equivalent, compared with 19.9% nationwide.
