= Parkwood Greyhound Stadium =

Defunct stadium in England

- Location: Craven Road, Keighley, West Yorkshire
- Coordinates: 53°52′19″N 1°53′25″W
- Opened: 1947
- Closed: 1974

Parkwood Greyhound Stadium was a greyhound racing and football stadium on Craven Road in Keighley, West Yorkshire.

== Origins ==
A football ground was constructed on a plot of land in an area known as Aireworth which was a well known for Cotton mills. The ground was used by local football team called Parkwood AFC, later Keighley Town until they folded in 1948. One year previous in 1947 the ground had been converted into a greyhound racing stadium. The stadium known as the Parkwood Stadium was located on the West of Aireworth Road between Beeches Road and the River Worth.

== Opening ==
The Yorkshire track opened to greyhound racing opened on 22 November 1947. The racing was independent (not affiliated to the sports governing body the National Greyhound Racing Club (NGRC)) and was known as a flapping track which was the nickname given to independent tracks.

== History ==
Racing was held on Tuesday and Saturday evenings at 7.30pm, the circumference of the tracks was 410 yards and consisted of race distances over 306 and 518 yards. There was an 'Inside Sumner' hare system and photo finish apparatus. Amenities included a licensed bar a snack bar and car parking.

The greyhounds were housed in kennels located three miles from the stadium in Steeton.

In 1965 the track record was broken by greyhound called Rusty after he recorded a time of 29.05 secs. It is alleged within the greyhound industry that this greyhound was actually a greyhound called 'Hi Joe' who was famously stolen at the time from the (NGRC) licensed kennels of Noreen Collin and had won a prestigious competition called the Juvenile and was one of the favourites for the 1965 English Greyhound Derby.

== Closure ==
The track was open for nearly thirty years before closing on 24 December 1974 due to new Airevalley Road proposals. Today the Airevalley Road (A650) which opened in 1988 covers what would have been the south part of the stadium and a local football ground covers the north part of the stadium (this football ground is sometimes mistakenly assumed that it was the exact position of the stadium).
