= Northampton Greyhound Stadium =

British greyhound racing venue

- Location: South Bridge Road, Northampton, Northamptonshire, East Midlands
- Coordinates: 52°13′51″N 0°53′28″W
- Opened: 1928
- Closed: 1964

Northampton Greyhound Stadium was a greyhound racing and speedway stadium located on what was South Bridge Road, Northampton, Northamptonshire, East Midlands (modern day New South Bridge Road).

== Location ==
The stadium was constructed on the north side of South Bridge Road, on the south bank of the River Nene and on the west side of the Bedford and Northampton branch railway line.

== Greyhound racing ==
The opening meeting was held on 7 April 1928 and the racing was independent (not affiliated to the sports governing body, the National Greyhound Racing Club).

The stadium was run by the Northampton Greyhound Racing Association and racing was held every Thursday and Saturday. A narrowboat was pulled across the South Quay of the River Nene to ferry people to the stadium.

== Speedway ==
The venue held speedway races during 1929 and 1930.

== Closure ==
The final meeting was held on 31 October 1964; a company called Greenoughs bought the stadium and converted it into a wallpaper and paint depot.
