= Stenhouse Stadium =

Former stadium in Edinburgh

- Interactive map of Stenhouse Stadium
- Location: Edinburgh, Scotland
- Coordinates: 55°55′45.149″N 3°15′16.135″W

Construction
- Opened: 1927
- Closed: 1951

Tenants
- Greyhound racing, trotting races

Stenhouse Stadium was a greyhound racing track and trotting track in Edinburgh.

== Origins ==
Edinburgh did not rival Glasgow in terms of greyhound racing popularity but still hosted four tracks in the 1930s. Powderhall Stadium which opened in 1927 was the largest, the Royal Gymnasium Greyhound Track, Marine Gardens and Stenhouse all started in 1932.

Built on the west side of the curvature of the Water of Leith the location of the track was in the south-west of Edinburgh and on the south side of the Gorgie Road which served as the main tramway for the immediate area referred to as Gorgie. It was just to the west of the recently built HM Prison Edinburgh sometimes referred to as Saughton or Stenhouse Prison and some of the prison cottages for the staff ran along the back of the greyhound track's west stand. The area was largely rural and was known as Saughton Mills before the building of the prison and housing that forms Stenhouse today. The track was built on top of a football ground that had hosted the Civil Service Strollers from 1908.

== Opening ==
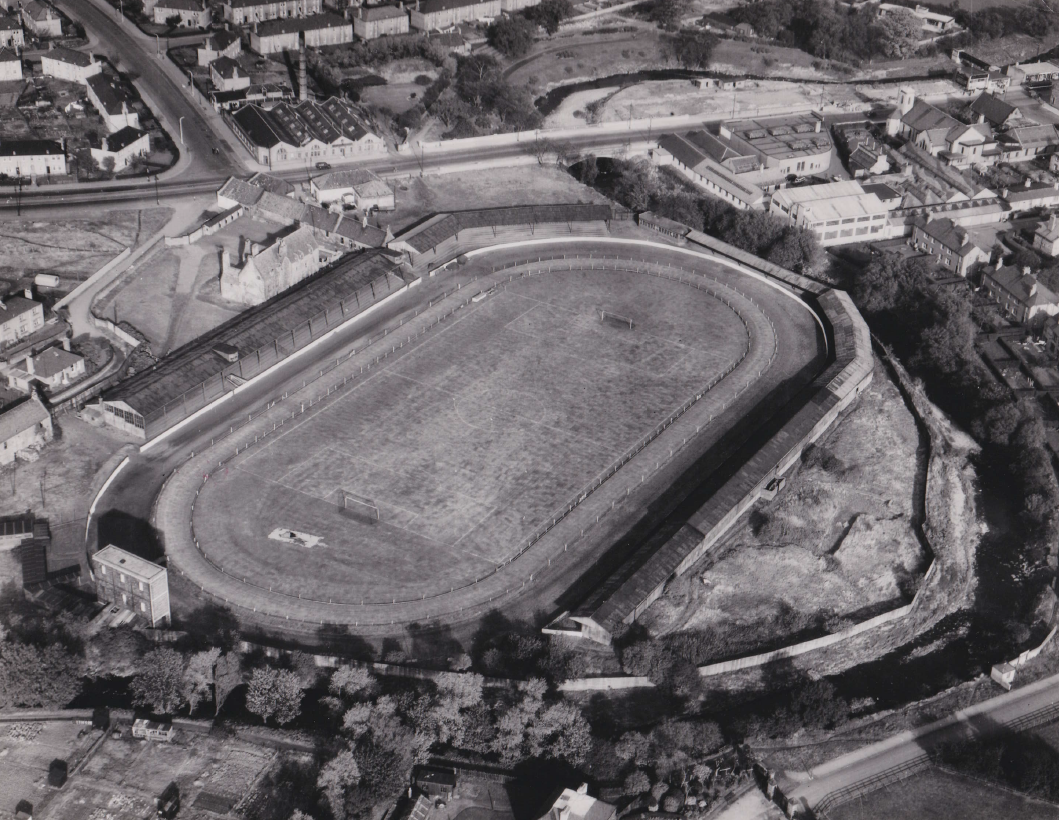
Stenhouse Stadium c.1940

On 25 June 1932 the stadium opened to greyhound racing. The first meeting (a Saturday afternoon) attracting 10,000 spectators witnessing seven races and betting on the new electric tote in one shilling units. The first recorded winner was Rebuke who won the Stenhouse Stakes in 31.80 secs over 525 yards, the 500 yard handicap races on the same afternoon saw slower winners times than the 525 yard events. A second meeting was held on the same evening of the first with another 10,000 spectators witnessing seven more races. The track was 440 yards in circumference and included two covered enclosures and a grandstand. Pony trotting also took place at the stadium on the opening day and would be a popular pastime at the venue.

== History ==
The track originally raced under British Greyhound Track Control Society (BGTCS) rules and was subject to prosecution in December 1933 following the use of a totalisator during the controversial period of government tote bans. In a surprise move in November 1935 the Greyhound Racing Association (GRA) made a successful bid to the Stenhouse directors and acquired the stadium. Alternative offers had been received by two English companies but the third GRA bid was higher and sealed the deal. The move came as a surprise because the GRA already owned Powderhall and the resident kennels were moved to the Powderhall stadium to form one base which was the normal routine for the GRA.

In 1938 the oldest building in the area known as Stenhouse Mansion was given to the National Trust for Scotland by the Greyhound Racing Association; the building had come into their possession as part of the 1935 purchase.

== Closure ==
The reasons for closure and exact dates of the closure are uncertain. It is clear that the GRA prioritised Powderhall and there are reports that some of the racing equipment was moved to Powderhall. Tote returns for 1950 were declared but the track is not listed in the 1951 tote returns or any year afterwards meaning that the closing date was during the early part of 1951.

The stadium itself remained and was renamed the Stenhouse Racing Stadium where trotting races continued with show jumping also prominent. The stadium continued to be used by various sports over the years until it was finally demolished and is now industrial units. The Stenhouse Mansion remains.

== Track records ==
Distance yards	Greyhound	Time	Date
525	S.L.D	29.65	4 September 1934
