= Wakefield Greyhound Stadium =

Sports venue in Yorkshire, England

- Location: Denby Dale Road, Wakefield, West Yorkshire
- Coordinates: 53°40′34″N 1°29′51″W
- Opened: 1933
- Closed: 1973

Wakefield Greyhound Stadium was a greyhound racing stadium in Wakefield, West Yorkshire.

== Origins ==
In 1933 a greyhound track was constructed in the heart of the city on an existing cricket ground where three railways lines intersected with each other. The site was south of the Wakefield Kirkgate Branch railway and north of the intersection of the Doncaster to Leeds viaduct and the London, Midland and Scottish railway (LMS).

The track would take the form of a bizarrely shaped greyhound circuit due to the plot of land running parallel to the 95 arch railway viaduct to the west and the LMS railway to the east. Instead of a standard oval track it almost resembled a triangle and would be accessed off the Denby Dale Road along Mark Lane.

== Opening ==
The stadium opened as the Wakefield Greyhound Sports Stadium on Wednesday 4 January 1933 under the rules of the British Greyhound Tracks Control Society (BGTCS) the rival to the much larger National Greyhound Racing Club (NGRC). There were covered stands in all enclosures with admission costing 2/- or 1/- (Shillings). The track soon left the control of the BGTCS and went independent (unaffiliated to a governing body).

== History ==
A well-publicised court case at the end of the first years trading culminated in Mr Justice Swift stating “I do not want to say anything in any way condemnatory of dog racing as a whole. I know nothing about dog racing and I only have to deal with the facts put before me in this case. But the amount of roguery exposed before me is greater than anything I have ever seen in any form of sport”. The case to which he referred was the suing of the Wakefield track owners Leonard Parker and Jane Hargreaves by Halifax bookmaker Willie Lumb. Lumb had supplied 39 greyhounds to the track for 10s per week per dog but the track owners counter claimed for keep and care. Further information came to light that Lumb was told how his greyhounds would be graded and if they were well, a claim denied. Lumb won the case and was awarded £215 but the judge summed up by criticising the way independent racing was organised and suggested that the police should become involved to prohibit any track running their track in this way.

Racing was held over the race distances of 285, 310 and 510 yards and after the Second World War in 1946 the track made a profit before tax of £60,000. In December 1966 the track applied to become licensed to the NGRC, bringing back stability and integrity to the track. They were the third independent track at the time to apply for the license.

Not too much is known of the post war racing but it is known that boxing bouts of note took place at the stadium as well as local school athletics.

== Closure ==
The site was sold during 1973 with the final meeting being held on 14 November 1973.

== Track records ==
| Distance yards | Greyhound | Time | Date |
|---|---|---|---|
| 512 | Adams Prairie | 29.07 | 1970 |
| 512 | Kinloch Star | 29.06 | 11.08.1971 |
| 665 | Katies Rusten | 38.33 | 13.08.1969 |
