= Boundary Park Stadium =

Former greyhound racing stadium in Norwich, England

- Location: Boundary Road, Norwich
- Coordinates: 52°39′24″N 1°16′13″E
- Opened: 1932
- Closed: 1962

Boundary Park Stadium was a greyhound racing stadium in Boundary Road, Norwich.

== Origins ==
In 1932 the site chosen for the Boundary Park Stadium was on the north side of the Boundary Road and on the west side Boundary Avenue. At the same time a new street called Overbury Road was being constructed and the gardens of the houses would be adjacent to the back of the stadium. The stadium was the second to be constructed in Norwich because the Firs Stadium had already opened during July 1932. The Firs stadium was very close by at the end of the Cromer Road and just five minutes walk away from Boundary Park. The cost of building Boundary Park was over £25,000.

== Opening ==
On 6 October 1932 Boundary Park opened under the promotion of the National Greyhounds Norwich Ltd and racing would take place every Monday, Wednesday and Saturday. Advertised as the 'wonder stadium' the opening night consisted of seven races over various distances. The first race was at 7.45pm and admission was either in the 2 shillings 6 pence enclosure or 1 shilling enclosure. There was covered accommodation for over 4,000 people, an all-electric totalisator with the entire furnishing of the stadium carried out by the Curl Brothers Ltd of Norwich.

The main grandstand was on the home straight and on the back straight was two small stands, a club house and two tote buildings. Between the first two bends was the kennel area with 160 kennels and a large paddocks, the turnstiles and large totalisator indicator were located between the third and fourth bends.

== Pre war history ==
Greyhound racing in Norwich became very popular and in 1933 Thorpe Greyhound Track in the Thorpe area of Norwich next to the River Yare opened but in 1935 the Firs closed. A fourth track in Norwich known as the City Stadium at Sprowston Road opened in 1939 but then Thorpe held its last meeting on 2 September 1939.

== Post war history ==
After the war improvements were made to the amenities including new track lighting, an 'Inside Sumner' system and ray timing were also installed. The circumference was 443 yards with the characteristics described as an average size racecourse with short straights and easy bends most suitable for the railer (greyhounds nearest the inside rail).

There were no kennel fees for owners of greyhounds because there was no prize money on offer either. In April 1946 a greyhound called Rimmells Black trained by Stanley Biss broke the track record.

A graded greyhound called Elizabeth Lizz set a new record as the oldest greyhound making a debut at a licensed track when winning a race aged four years, three months old in 1947. She belonged to a litter that included four others who reached the Western Two-Year Old Produce Stakes Final. Arthur Rising was the Racing Manager for over a decade until the track closed.

== Closure ==
In 1962 the track ceased to trade after being sold as a redevelopment site for the Eastern Electric Company, the last meeting took place on 1 December 1962. The site today is a large B&Q store.

== Track records ==
Distance yards	Greyhound	Time	Date	Notes
280	Vexatious	16.19	23.04.1936	
300	Boundary Albert	17.17	29.07.1945	
500	Rimmells Black	28.40	03.04.1946	
500	Fakenham Eagle	28.84	18.06.1945	scratch record
500	Cancy Sweeper	28.72	22.12.1945	
723	True Pal	43.11	18.03.1933	
