= Easington Greyhound Stadium =

Sporting venue in County Durham, England

- Interactive map of Easington Greyhound Stadium
- Location: Easington, County Durham, UK
- Coordinates: 54°47′34″N 1°21′13″W

Construction
- Opened: 1934
- Closed: 2017

Easington Greyhound Stadium, also known as Moorfield Stadium, was a greyhound racing stadium in Sunderland Road, Easington, County Durham.

== Origins ==
The stadium was originally called the Moorfield Stadium and was built in 1933 on the west side of Sunderland Road north of Easington in a rural location. The racing provided entertainment for a population centered around mining and the nearby Easington Colliery.

== History ==
The opening meeting was held on Christmas Day 1934, with the first winner being a greyhound called 'Must Win' who recorded a winning time of 27.07secs.

During the war, Lord Haw-Haw famously said, "This week the people of Easington will be eating greyhounds not racing them".

During the 1960s and 1970s, racing was directed by Mrs H Taylor and distances raced were 270, 460, 525 and 640 yards on 380 track circumference. There were 70 kennels and a Ball hare system was used. Facilities included a licensed bar and tea bar with racing held on Thursday and Saturday evenings at 7.30pm. All races were handicap races with the principal annual events known as the Moorfield Challenge Trophy and the Bank Holiday Stakes.

By the late 1980s the owner was Frank Fannon and there was car parking for 200 vehicles.

Racing took place on Sundays at 6pm. Race distances of 60, 235, 410 and 573 metres were used.

The stadium was closed in 2017.
