= Oldham Greyhound Stadium =

Sports venue in the UK

- Location: Watersheddings area, north east Oldham
- Coordinates: 53°33′09″N 2°04′49″W
- Opened: 1933
- Closed: 1997

The Oldham Greyhound Stadium was a greyhound racing stadium in the Watersheddings area in the north east of Oldham.

== Origins ==
In 1889 part of the Watersheddings area in north east Oldham was selected to construct sporting facilities for the town. A rugby league stadium was built for the Oldham Rugby Football League club and would be known as Watersheddings; it was constructed on the east side of a reservoir, Ruby Mill and Longfield Mill and north of Longfield Lane. At the same time the Oldham Cricket Ground was built adjacent to the rugby league stadium on its east side and a lawn tennis ground was constructed on its north side. On the north side of the cricket ground was a bowling green.

A recreation ground was added on the south-east side of the cricket ground but in 1933 the decision was made to demolish the cricket ground to make way for a greyhound racing stadium. It was advertised as a 'Super Greyhound Stadium' and had a large stand erected on the north side against Bramble Avenue and another stand and car park added on the south side which was accessed from the relatively new Peach Road.

== Opening ==
The opening night was on Friday 9 June 1933 with the racing being held under the British Greyhound Track Control Society (BGTCS) rules. The BGTCS was one of the two organisations tasked with setting the regulations for the sport; the other being the larger National Greyhound Racing Club (NGRC). Racing took place every Monday, Wednesday and Saturday at 8pm with a matinee meeting on Tuesday afternoon at 3.15pm. The track had a small circumference of just 348 yards with race distances of 240, 520, 585 and 767 yards.

The stadium facilities included a licensed club in the Grand Stand enclosure serving Woodside Brewery and Bentley's Yorkshire Brewery Ales.

== History ==
In 1935 the BGTCS disbanded leaving Oldham with independent status (unaffiliated to a governing body) and the track chose not to become affiliated with the NGRC.

In the 1960s the track raced on Thursday evenings running graded races and handicap races.

In 1983 the track celebrated fifty years as a flapper (nickname for independents); racing had been extended to Tuesday, Thursday and Saturday evenings with a trial session on a Sunday. The circumference was listed as 350 yards with race distances of 240, 417, 585 and 767 yards behind an 'Inside Sumner' hare system. In addition to this there was a car park for 400 vehicles and 46 kennels on site for the racers.

== Closure ==
The entire sports site including both stadiums (rugby league and greyhound racing) was sold for redevelopment in 1997. The greyhound racing ended and the rugby club left Watersheddings. The site was redeveloped into housing with Ferguson Way now being located where the greyhound stadium once stood.
