= Thorpe Greyhound Track =

Former greyhound racing track in Norwich, England

- Location: Thorpe Hamlet, Norwich
- Coordinates: 52°37′33″N 1°19′42″E
- Opened: 1933
- Closed: 1939

Thorpe Greyhound Track was a greyhound racing track in Thorpe Hamlet, Norwich.

== History ==
George Carey owned a series of fields called Careys Meadow which was situated in Thorpe Hamlet, east of Norwich and south of the Yarmouth Road.

The fields were prone to flooding being next to River Yare but in 1933 Carey decided to build a greyhound track just one year after The Firs Stadium and Boundary Park Stadium had opened.

The greyhound track opened on 17 June 1933 becoming the third track in Norwich to open. The racing was independent (unaffiliated to a governing body) and operated in the summer. In winter the fields were manually flooded allowing the site to double up as an ice skating venue. The last greyhound meeting took place on 2 September 1939 before the start of World War II and never reopened.
