= Rotherham Greyhound Stadium =

Greyhound racing stadium in Holmes, England

- Location: Psalters Lane, Holmes, Rotherham, South Yorkshire
- Coordinates: 3°25′43″N 1°22′50″W
- Opened: 1933
- Closed: 1974

Rotherham Greyhound Stadium was a greyhound racing stadium in Holmes, Rotherham, South Yorkshire.

== Origins ==
The stadium was constructed in 1933 in an area known as Holmes on the east side of Psalters Lane and the west side of Hartington Road and north of Holmes railway station.

== Opening ==
The track opened on 31 July 1933 and was owned by the same company that brought greyhounds to Millmoor. The racing was independent (not affiliated to the sports governing body the National Greyhound Racing Club) and was known as a flapping track which was the nickname given to independent tracks.

== History ==
Racing was held on Monday and Thursday evenings at 7.45pm. The Racing consisted of handicap races and level break racing on an all-grass circuit and the main racing distance was 405 yards behind an 'Inside Sumner' hare system.

== Closure ==
The track was closed in 1974 and redeveloped into housing called Hartington Close.
