= Hartlepool Stadium =

Sports venue in Hartlepool, England

- Interactive map of Hartlepool Stadium
- Location: Clarence Road, Hartlepool, County Durham
- Coordinates: 54°41′15″N 1°12′44″W

Construction
- Closed: 1999

Hartlepool Stadium was a greyhound racing, football, cricket and rugby union stadium in Clarence Road, Hartlepool, County Durham.

It is not to be confused with Victoria Park (Hartlepool) which was adjacent to the stadium in Clarence Road.

== Origins ==
The site was first used as a cricket ground in 1881 when the Hartlepool Cricket Club moved there from Burn Road. They continued to play at the ground until 1911.

After the cricket team vacated the ground it was converted into a football stadium on the south side of Victoria Park (Hartlepool) which was the home of West Hartlepool R.F.C.

== Greyhound racing ==
A greyhound track was constructed around the ground in 1938. The first meeting was held on 14 September 1938 drawing an attendance of 4,000 and the first winner was a greyhound called Arran Beg. During the war the track suffered considerable bomb damage.

Owned by the Hartlepool Greyhound Racing Company Ltd (HGRC) the track had a small 365 yards circumference and race distances of 266, 460 and 640 yards. There was a covered stand, a restaurant, 35 kennels and an 'Inside Sumner' hare system was used. There were seven on course bookmakers and the principal event was the Vaux Tankard. Facilities included a licensed bar and cafe. The racing was independent (unaffiliated to a governing body).

== Rugby union ==
West Hartlepool played at the stadium from the 1920s until the 1970s.

== Closure ==
Greyhound racing continued to be promoted by the HGRC until 1999 when the stadium closed. It was later demolished and redeveloped into a large Morrisons supermarket.
