= Blackburn Greyhound Stadium =

UK greyhound racing stadium

- Location: Blackburn, Lancashire
- Coordinates: 53°45′03″N 2°27′32″W
- Opened: 1933
- Closed: 1984

Blackburn Greyhound Stadium was a greyhound racing stadium in Blackburn, Lancashire.

== Origins ==
The stadium was built backing onto the Leeds and Liverpool Canal and was surrounded by three streets in an area known as Green Bank. The first street was located to the west called Hill Street, the second to the south was Crabtree Street and to the east was Gorse Street.

== Opening ==
The first meeting was held on Monday 27 March 1933 under the affiliation of the British Greyhound Tracks Control Society (BGTCS) the only rival to the National Greyhound Racing Club (NGRC). The circumference of the track was 400 yards and a main stand could be found on the south side of the stadium with a slightly smaller stand facing it on the opposite of the track. The kennels ran alongside the canal and very close to a boat house. Originally the west part of site had been unused land but the east side contained the 1885 Furthergate Chemical Works which were demolished to make way for the track.

== History ==
Following the demise of the BGTCS in 1935 the Blackburn Stadium management decide to remain independent (unaffiliated to a governing body), a status that was retained for the next fifty years. Totalisator turnover peaked in 1946 at £529,773 in comparison to 1968 when it had dropped to £298,000.

During the 1960s the races over 352, 535 and 745 yards were mainly of handicaps and five runners but there was an 'Inside Sumner' hare with photo finish ray timing installed. The all-grass track remained popular in Lancashire with the Daily Express, the Sun and Daily Mail carrying cards despite the fact that it was an independent. Racing was held on Monday and Friday evenings at 7.45pm and facilities included club rooms and a refreshment bar.

During the late 1970s and early 1980s the track had converted to all-sand and distances listed were 325, 475, 535 & 745 yards with racing increasing to three nights per week on Tuesday, Thursday & Friday evenings.

== Closure ==
During 1982 the site was purchased by Tesco which inevitably led to the stadium closing. The stadium closed on 1 June 1984 and was demolished soon after.
