= Priory Park Sports Ground =

Former stadium in England

- Location: Priory Bridge Road, Taunton, Somerset
- Coordinates: 51°01′13″N 3°05′48″W
- Opened: c.1925
- Closed: c.2001

Priory Park Sports Ground was a rugby union, football and greyhound racing stadium located on the north side of Priory Bridge Road and the south bank of the River Tone in Taunton, Somerset.

== Origins ==
The stadium was originally a football stadium and was used by Taunton United F.C. in c.1925. Somerset Police F.C and Taunton Town F.C both used the ground during the 1930s.

== Rugby ==
The stadium was the home of Taunton R.F.C from 1935 to 2001.

== Greyhound racing ==
Greyhound racing events were held in the early 1930s before becoming a weekly event from Boxing Day 1947 until 5 December 1950. The racing was independent (not affiliated to the sports governing body the National Greyhound Racing Club) and race distances consisted of 485 and 650 yards.

This greyhound racing venue should not be confused with the Priory Greyhound Stadium which was the name for the greyhound operation held at the nearby County Ground, Taunton.

== Other uses ==
Taunton Athletic Club also held fixtures at the ground.
