= The Firs Stadium =

Motorcycle speedway stadium in Norwich, England

- Location: Cromer Road, Norwich
- Coordinates: 52°39′55″N 1°16′14″E
- Opened: 1930
- Closed: 1935 (greyhound Racing); 1964 (speedway)

The Firs Stadium was a speedway stadium in Cromer Road, Norwich.

== History ==
The stadium was built on an empty field situated in the Hellesdon area on the west side of where the Holt Road and Cromer Road meet. The address was listed as Aylsham Road but this is a little misleading because although the Cromer Road is effectively a continuation of the Aylsham Road it was unequivocally on the Cromer Road. It is believed to have been named after the nearby Firs House.

The stadium was sold for re-development at the end of 1964.

== Speedway ==
The stadium was owned by Eastern Speedways and was a popular speedway venue opening on 17 August 1930 and closing on 31 October 1964.

== Greyhound racing ==
The Firs Stadium was the first of four greyhound tracks that operated in the city. It was a short lived enterprise only lasting from 1932 until 1935.

The opening night was 30 July 1932 two months before the opening of the Boundary Park Stadium but only survived until 14 January 1935 probably due to stiff competition from other Norwich tracks. The racing was independent (unaffiliated to a governing body).
