= Tams Brig Stadium =

Greyhound racing stadium in Ayr, Scotland

Ayr Tams Brig Greyhound Stadium
- Location: Tams Brig, Limekiln Road, Ayr
- Coordinates: 55°28′23.3″N 4°37′38.4″W
- Opened: 1933
- Closed: 1972

Tams Brig Greyhound Stadium was a greyhound racing stadium in Ayr, Scotland.

== History ==
The Tams Brig track, also known as Ayr Greyhound Stadium, was located between Limekiln Road and Elmbank Street, and was overlooked by the houses that ran along Elmbank Street. The first race was on 16 December 1933 and racing took place on Monday and Saturday evenings at 7pm. Amenities included a large licensed club and sixteen on-course bookmakers. The circumference was tight because it was 300 yards with race distances of 250, 400 & 550 yards. The circuit was changed to all sand in the late sixties, and the starting traps and photo finish were constructed by the stadium staff.

== Last days ==
Tams Brig was active for 39 years until 30 December 1972, when it was replaced by the Ayr Curling Club and ice rink.
