= Tote board =

Large numeric or alphanumeric display used to convey information

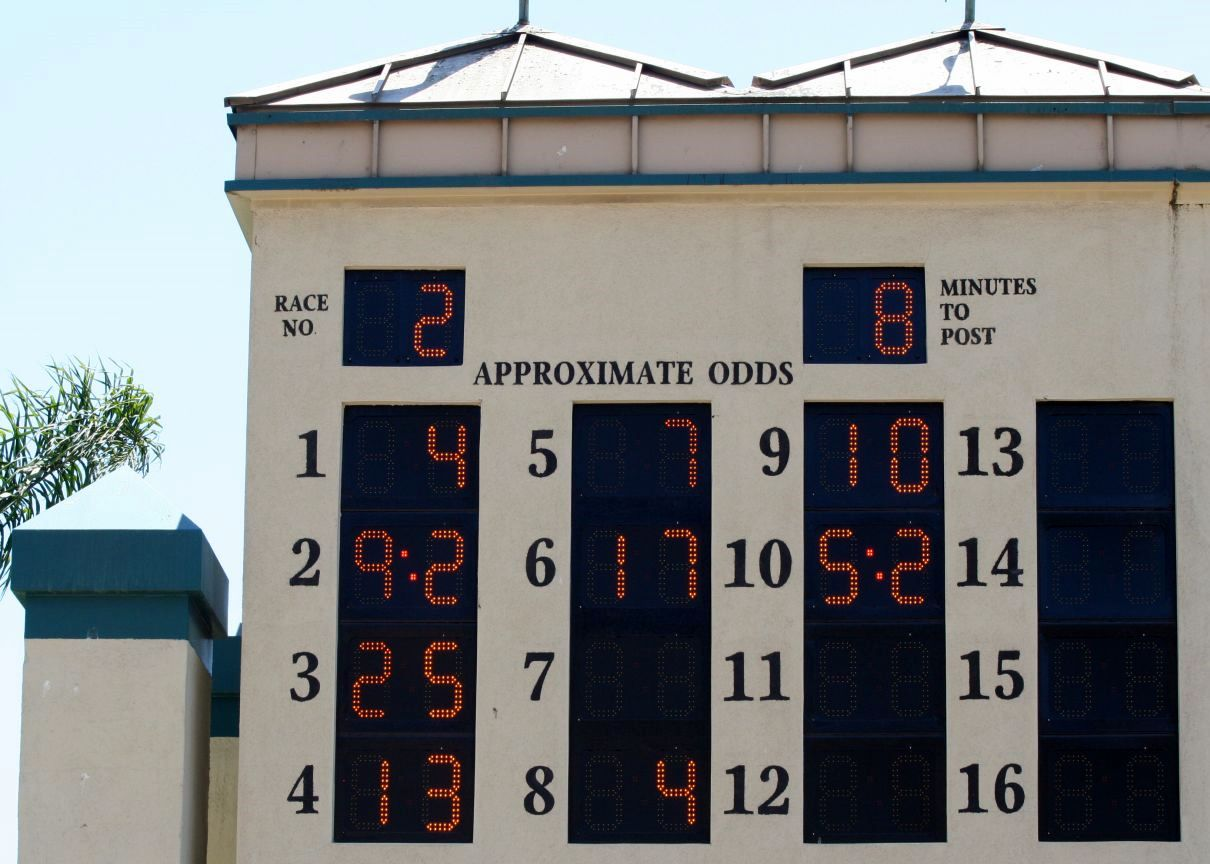
Tote Board at Hollywood Park, California

A tote board (or totalisator/totalizator) is a numeric or alphanumeric display used to convey information, typically at a race track (to display the odds or payoffs for each horse) or at a telethon (to display the total amount donated to the charitable organization sponsoring the event).

The term "tote board" comes from the colloquialism for "totalizator" (or "totalisator"), the name for the automated system which runs parimutuel betting, calculating payoff odds, displaying them, and producing tickets based on incoming bets.

== History ==
Parimutuel systems had used totalisator boards since the 1860s, and they were often housed in substantial buildings. However, the manual systems often resulted in substantial delays in calculations of clients' payouts.

The first all-mechanical totalisator was invented by George Julius. Julius was a consulting engineer, based in Sydney. His father, Churchill Julius, an Anglican Bishop, had campaigned, in the early years of the twentieth century, against the iniquities of gambling using totalisators and its damage to New Zealand society. That attitude had changed by late 1907 when he argued that the totalisator removed much of the evil of gambling with bookmakers. Bishop Churchill was himself an amateur mechanic, with a reputation for fixing clocks and organs in parishes he visited.

Initially, Julius was attempting to develop a voting calculating machine for the Government of Australia to automatically reduce the instances of voter fraud and create a cheat-free political environment. He went on to present his unique invention, only to have his design rejected as it was deemed to be excessive.

The first all-mechanical machine was installed at Ellerslie Racecourse in New Zealand in 1913 (first used on the Holy Saturday races on 22 March 1913), and the second was installed at Gloucester Park Racetrack in Western Australia in 1917. Julius founded Automatic Totalisators Limited (ATL) in 1917, which supplied the "Premier Totalisator: now including electrical components". The first totalisators installed in the United States were at Hialeah Park, Florida, in 1932 (by ATL), and at Arlington Park racecourse, Chicago, in 1933 by American Totalisator. The first entirely electronic totalisator was developed in 1966.

Totalisators have been superseded by general purpose computers running specialised wagering software such as Autotote. In many cases beyond older systems, telethon tote boards have either been replaced by LCD displays showing totals, or scoreboards adapted to display dollar amounts.

== Automatic totalisators ==
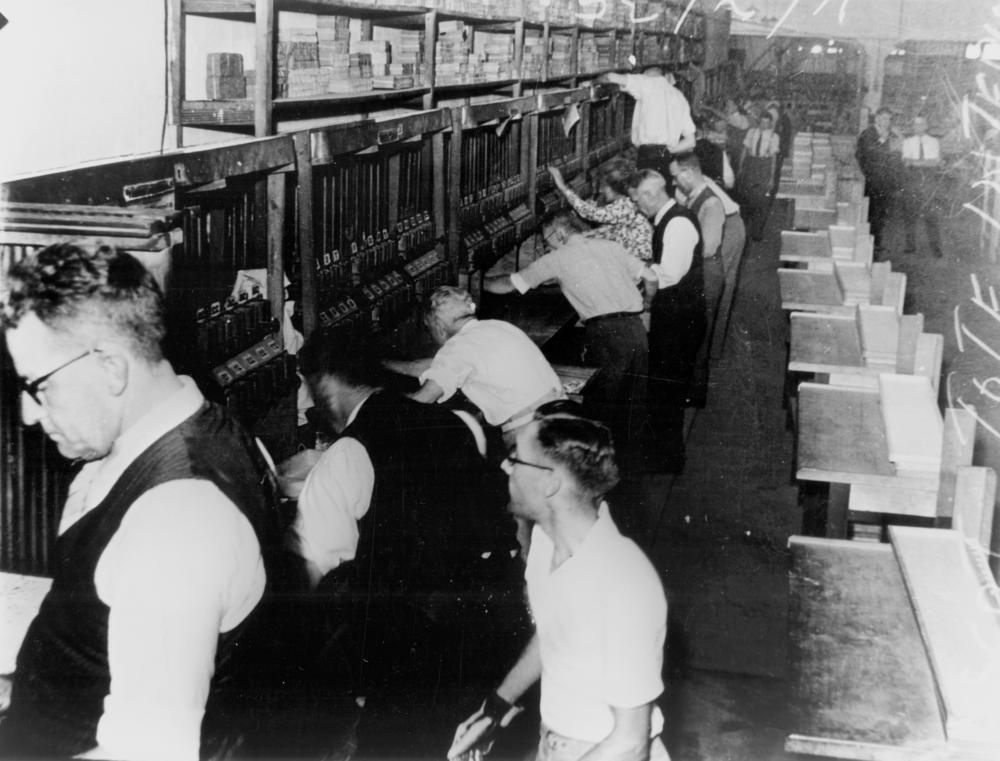
Behind the betting windows at Ascot racetrack, Australia February 1939

An automatic totalisator is a device to add up the bets in a pari-mutuel betting system. The whole of the pot (the stakes on all competitors) is divided pro rata to the stakes placed on the winning competitor, and those tickets are paid out. Essentially, it implements a system of starting price (SP) betting.

In particular, it refers to the invention of George Julius, the English-born, New Zealand educated, Australian inventor, engineer and businessman, though there have been other claimants, notably engineer Joseph G. Nash.

The term automatic refers to the fact that the bets were automatically summed and a ticket issued when a bet was registered on the issuing machines, and it provided a safe and virtually fraud-free method of betting, replacing the earlier jam-pot totes, which used either paper transactions or some method of counting bets like steel ball bearings. The machine did not actually calculate the payout.

The method was widely used in the Australian, New Zealand and American horse-racing industries and for greyhound racing in the UK, although there were other installations in countries as diverse as France, Venezuela and Singapore.

== See also ==
- American Totalisator
- Harringay Stadium
- Tabulating machine
