= National Greyhound Racing Club =

UK sports governing body

The National Greyhound Racing Club was an organisation that governed Greyhound racing in the United Kingdom.

== History ==
The National Greyhound Racing Club (NGRC) was formed in 1928 and this body would be responsible for regulation, licensing and the rules of racing that came into force on 23 April 1928. It consisted of twelve stewards, one of them senior and most of them with military or police backgrounds.

Any greyhound track licensed under NGRC rules would have to adhere to all rules set by them. The National Greyhound Racing Society was a branch of the NGRC responsible for the promotion of the industry. By 1946 the Club employed a 300 strong security service to ensure fair play on its associated tracks.

In 1972 the National Greyhound Racing Club and National Greyhound Racing Society amalgamated to form one controlling body called the National Greyhound Racing Club Ltd.

In 1987 its secretary Fred Underhill received an O.B.E in recognition of his service from 1962–1988.

== Disbandment ==
They would continue to govern the sport until 2009 when they merged with the British Greyhound Racing Board and a new organisation was born called the Greyhound Board of Great Britain (GBGB). The remit was the same in regard to rules and regulations and the promotion of the sport but there were some extra responsibilities. The issue of welfare was high on the agenda and it was vital to show those who did not know how the sport worked that the greyhounds were given the highest priority.
