= 1946 UK & Ireland Greyhound Racing Year =

The 1946 UK & Ireland Greyhound Racing Year was the 21st year of greyhound racing in the United Kingdom and the 20th year of greyhound racing in Ireland.

== Roll of honour ==
Major Winners
Award	Name of Winner
1946 English Greyhound Derby	Mondays News
1946 Irish Greyhound Derby	Steve
1946 Scottish Greyhound Derby	Lattin Pearl
1946 Welsh Greyhound Derby	Negro's Lad

== Summary ==
The greyhound racing industry experienced an extraordinary year in 1946, with all previous records in terms of attendances and totalisator turnover being broken. The year would be the pinnacle in the history of the sport and would never be matched again. Attendances were estimated to be around 75 million based on an annual totalisator turnover of £196,431,430. Trading on greyhound racing shares at the stock exchange were centre stage business.

The leading greyhound company, the Greyhound Racing Association (GRA) recorded record attendances and profits at all of their tracks. The largest tote turnover was at White City and reached £17,576,190.

== Competitions ==
Mondays News won the 1946 English Greyhound Derby, run under floodlights for the first time. In the Derby Consolation Stakes, Quare Times won by four lengths from Bah's Choice in 28.82 seconds to improve on his own world record.

The Scottish Greyhound Derby and Welsh Greyhound Derby clashed, in the former Lattin Pearl defeated Grand Prix champion Magic Bohemian and in the latter, Negros Lad overcame a field including defending champion Shaggy Lass and 1945 English Greyhound Derby finalist Duffys Arrival. The time of 29.54 broke the track record.

A week after the Scurry Gold Cup (won by Mischievous Manhattan) the Wembley Summer Cup paired the two fastest greyhounds in training Bah's Choice and Quare Times. Bah's Choice won the event from Shannon Shore, Magic Bohemian, Shaggy Lass and Negro's Lad in addition to Quare Times. The race attracted significant national attention and Major Percy Brown (Racing manager at White City) contacted the owners of the two greyhounds to arrange a return match between them, at White City, on August Bank Holiday Monday. Quare Times was handled by the 'Wizard of Burhill', Sidney Orton, while Bah's Choice was trained by Bob Burls at Wembley. Quare Times, was first from the traps and made no mistakes setting a new world record of 30.38 seconds for the 550 yards course.

In the Invitation Stakes run at Coventry on 9 August, Bah's Choice gained revenge beating Quare Times by five lengths, in a new track record with a time of 29.45 seconds. Sadly entered for the Birmingham Cup at Perry Barr in September, Bahs Choice broke a hock in his first round heat and was retired to stud. Shannon Shore gained some compensation for his Derby defeat after winning the Laurels, the January 1943 whelp would retire to stud after an unsuccessful attempt to retain his Golden Crest crown which went to Rimmells Black. Stan Biss won the Oaks for the fifth time with Dumbles Maid, a brindle and white bitch that had turned in the traps and refused to chase just a few weeks previous.

A strong entry for the St Leger saw Bohernagraga Boy win by just a short head from recent Oaks champion Dumbles Maid, Monday's News struggled with the longer distance and could only finish a disappointing fifth. History was made during the All England Cup, held at Brough Park when four of the entries were all four nations Derby winners. The English Greyhound Derby winner Mondays News, the Irish Greyhound Derby champion Lilac Lady, Welsh Greyhound Derby winner Negro's Lad and Scottish Greyhound Derby champion Lattin Pearl all competed. The hope that all four would progress to the final failed to materialise but two of them Monday's News and Lattin Pearl did make the final and duly finished first and second.

== Tracks ==
Just two known tracks were opened during 1946.

The Glasgow City assessor attempted to increase the valuations of the five greyhound stadiums in Glasgow, which was opposed by the tracks because they did not want to have to pay increased tax. Carntyne, owned by the Scottish Greyhound Racing Company was valued at £4,500 by the assessor but £3,700 by the track, which was followed by White City, White City Glasgow Ltd £6,700 (£4,000), Albion, Glasgow-Albion Racing Ltd £12,000 (£1,250), Firhill, Partick Thistle FC & Firhill Racing Company Ltd £3,000 (£2,500) and finally Shawfield, Shawfield Greyhound Racing Company Ltd £4,000 (£600).

=== Tracks opened ===
Date	Stadium/Track	Location
5 June	Kilkenny Greyhound Stadium	Kilkenny
11 June	Melton Mowbray Greyhound Stadium	Melton Mowbray

== News ==
1946 Irish Greyhound Derby winner Steve was withdrawn from the Aldridges sales despite bids in excess of £1,000. Owner Mrs. R.H.Dent refused to sell to connections who intended to flap (race on independent tracks) with him. Steve would have to continue his career in Ireland because English Racing Managers refused to allow him to race. This was because of a previous disqualification for fighting at Wembley during a trial. Two other greyhounds failed to sell at Aldridges; Motts Regret went unsold despite a bid of 1,250 guineas and Col Skookum was taken off the bench despite a 1,450 guineas bid.

Walthamstow Stadium owner William Chandler died and left equal shares to his children. Charles Chandler became managing director and Percy was responsible for the catering and restaurants. Victor Sr. and Jack were already bookmakers and Ronnie trained greyhounds in Ireland.

In July the first case of a greyhound traveling by air took place when Warrington greyhound Clady Border, trained by Ken Newham went from Manchester Airport to Belfast, to take part in an event at Celtic Park in which he won. During the same year Fernane Sweeper was the first greyhound to fly the Atlantic. Wandsworth transported their racing greyhounds from the track kennels to the race track using a Scammell Mechanical Horse that pulled a trailer of 56 greyhounds in individual kennels to the race track.

Motts Regret, a brindle whelped in April 1944 by Trev's Dispatch out of Friar Tuck, had been bred and reared in the Cumberland Fells by Mr H.G. Nunn. During the year he won a number of open races and was entered for the English Greyhound Derby at White City without success. Later that year he went down with distemper and pneumonia at the GRA Hook Estate and Kennels in Northaw and it was thought he would die, but after a long convalescence would make it back to the track in 1947. Lemon Flash (the 1946 McAlinden Cup winner) and Tim O'Linn died of distemper in Birmingham private kennels, the latter had recently cost his new owner £1,400.

Frederick Johnson a breeder from Tarporley in Cheshire, was refused a private trainers licence by the National Greyhound Racing Club, with his wife Mary they farmed sixty acres and bred the 'Rushton' greyhounds prefix. Johnson contemplated giving up greyhound racing after the decision but luckily decided against it.

Ballynennan Moon and Ballyhennessy Seal both on stud duties demanded £100 for a mating fee at the Burhill Kennels.

A greyhound called Long Rally who set a track record in his first race at Darnall is subject to a record bid of 2,100 guineas but his owner refuses the offer because he had set a reserve of 2,250 guineas.

== Ireland ==
Kilkenny Greyhound Stadium opened on 5 June, the first winner was a greyhound called Rebel Gunner. Dunmore Stadium, in Belfast which had suffered serious fire and bomb damage during the war underwent significant renovation. Two new stands were built, one acted as a reserved area and the other was unreserved. The 1946 Irish Greyhound Derby was won by an English connection for the first time when Steve, owned by Mrs. R.H.Dent took the honours. Mrs. Dent had owned Wattle Bark, winner of the 1937 English Greyhound Derby.

== Principal UK races ==
Grand National, White City (May 18 525y h, £300)
Pos	Name of Greyhound	Trainer	SP	Time	Trap
1st	Barry From Limerick	E Davidson	2-1	30.61	2
2nd	Bright Board	Michael Downey	7-2	30.64	1
3rd	Niggers Toe	Catford	13-8f	30.68	5
4th	Cadet Captain	Dal Hawkesley	5-1	30.92	4
N/R	Baytown Blackbird	Reg String Marsh			

Gold Collar, Catford (Jun 1, 440y, £500)
Pos	Name of Greyhound	Trainer	SP	Time	Trap
1st	King Silver	Cornelius Crowley	9-4	25.88	2
2nd	Mischievous Manhatton	Paddy Fortune	4-1	25.96	6
3rd	Mondays Son	L Hague	5-4f	25.99	1
4th	Kildrum Boy	Michael Downey	8-1	26.02	5
5th	Hoot of Selsdon	Jerry Hannafin	20-1	26.10	3
N/R	Alvaston Apollo	Stan Martin			

Scottish Greyhound Derby, Carntyne (Jul 6, 525y, £500)
Pos	Name of Greyhound	Trainer	SP	Time	Trap
1st	Lattin Pearl	M Gemmell	11-10f	29.53	3
2nd	Magic Bohemian	Leslie Reynolds	5-2	29.69	2
3rd	Tom Bawn		33-1	29.72	4
4th	Lone Hunter	Ken Newham	12-1	29.88	5
5th	Mondays Son	L Hague	7-2	30.04	1
N/R	Final Spar	Alfred Spensley			

Welsh Derby, Arms Park (Jul 6, 525y)
Pos	Name of Greyhound	Trainer	SP	Time	Trap
1st	Negro's Lad	Jack Toseland	8-1	29.54+	5
2nd	Lee Ripple	Clapton	100-6	29.78	2
3rd	Elbows Print	John Skeaping	5-2	29.86	1
4th	Duffys Arrival	Michael Downey	7-1	29.94	4
5th	Shaggy Lass	G Vickery	10-11f	30.02	6
6th	Sergeant Bullard	Cardiff	50-1	30.34	3

+Track Record

Scurry Gold Cup, Clapton (Jul 27, 400y £500)
Pos	Name of Greyhound	Trainer	SP	Time	Trap
1st	Mischievous Manhatton	Paddy Fortune	5-4f	23.40	1
2nd	Rimmells Black	Stanley Biss	4-1	23.44	4
3rd	Missouri	Fred Farey	3-1	23.92	2
4th	Waldour Street	Stanley Biss	100-7	24.24	6
5th	Esk	Sidney Orton	100-6	24.48	3
6th	Just Glory	Fred Trevillion	6-1	25.28	5

Laurels, Wimbledon (Aug 30, 500y, £500)
Pos	Name of Greyhound	Trainer	SP	Time	Trap
1st	Shannon Shore	Leslie Reynolds	7-1	28.26	2
2nd	Tan Gent	Sidney Orton	9-2	28.32	3
3rd	Missouri	Clapton	100-7	28.38	5
4th	Quare Times	Sidney Orton	11-10f	28.42	4
5th	Rimmells Black	Stanley Biss	8-1	28.82	6
6th	Plucky Hero	Wilf France	11-4	28.98	1

Oaks, White City (Sep 14, 525y, £300)
Pos	Name of Greyhound	Trainer	SP	Time	Trap
1st	Dumbles Maid	Stanley Biss	13-8	29.42	5
2nd	Mudinuri	Stanley Biss	4-1	29.70	6
3rd	Simone	Michael Downey	11-10f	29.74	1
4th	Willow Queen		50-1	29.92	2
5th	Call Maggie	Stan Gray	100-7	30.56	3
6th	Lopham Sally		50-1	30.64	4

St Leger, Wembley (Oct 5, 700y, £500)
Pos	Name of Greyhound	Trainer	SP	Time	Trap
1st	Bohernagraga Boy	Jim Syder Sr.	1-1f	39.92	4
2nd	Dumbles Maid	Stanley Biss	9-4	39.93	1
3rd	Simone	Michael Downey	100-8	40.17	5
4th	Killoran Castle	D.R.Hayes	6-1	40.18	6
5th	Mondays News	Fred Farey	5-1	40.26	3
N/R	Call Maggie	Stan Gray			

Cesarewitch, West Ham (Oct 29, 600y, £500)
Pos	Name of Greyhound	Trainer	SP	Time	Trap
1st	Col Skookurn	Sidney Orton	4-1	31.28	5
2nd	Projective		7-2	31.29	2
3rd	Bright Oak	Jack Harvey	11-2	31.37	1
4th	Fine Price		33-1	31.39	3
5th	Bally Rambler	G Smith	2-1f	31.61	4
6th	Sporting Hero	Paddy McEllistrim	9-2	31.65	6

The Grand Prix Walthamstow (Nov 9, 525y, £500)
Pos	Name of Greyhound	Trainer	SP	Time	Trap
1st	Tonycus	Leslie Reynolds	6-1	30.19	2
2nd	Dante II	Wilf France	3-1	30.25	1
3rd	Mondays News	Fred Farey	10-11f	30.65	4
4th	Eire Model	Jonathan Hopkins	33-1	30.89	3
5th	Tan Gent	Sidney Orton	6-1	30.97	5
6th	Rimmells Black	Stanley Biss	100-7	31.01	6

== Totalisator Returns ==
Extended content

The totalisator returns declared to the licensing authorities for the year 1946 are listed below. Tracks that did not have a totalisator in operation are not listed. Attendances peaked during the year, at around 70 million and totalisator turnover surpassed £196 million reaching £196,431,430.

Stadium	Turnover £
London (White City)	17,576,190
London (Harringay)	11,046,994
London (Wembley)	10,905,145
London (Wimbledon)	9,086,557
London (Walthamstow)	7,355,147
London (Clapton)	5,802,609
London (Stamford Bridge)	5,749,592
London (Catford)	5,397,432
London (West Ham)	5,362,519
London (Wandsworth)	4,650,421
London (Park Royal)	4,310,543
Glasgow (Shawfield)	4,305,390
Manchester (Belle Vue)	3,840,902
Birmingham (Perry Barr, old)	3,527,283
London (New Cross)	3,095,736
London (Hackney)	3,081,734
Bradford (Greenfield)	2,659,145
Edinburgh (Powderhall)	2,542,000
Coventry (Lythalls Lane)	2,477,328
Brighton & Hove	2,455,699
Sheffield (Owlerton)	2,447,609
Glasgow (White City)	2,394,340
London (Hendon)	2,302,255
Birmingham (Hall Green)	2,238,042
Crayford & Bexleyheath	2,148,611
Newcastle (Brough Park)	2,104,702
Manchester (Salford)	2,101,998
Glasgow (Carntyne)	2,074,785
Bristol (Eastville)	2,064,358
London (Charlton)	2,038,891
Glasgow (Albion)	2,037,304
Liverpool (Seaforth)	1,990,410
Sheffield (Darnall)	1,987,266
Manchester (White City)	1,878,980
Liverpool (Stanley)	1,814,431
Blackpool (St Anne's)	1,793,345
Southampton	1,729,291
Liverpool (White City)	1,726,194
Gateshead	1,695,911
Newcastle (Gosforth)	1,644,257
Leicester (Blackbird Rd)	1,605,830
Nottingham (White City)	1,549,732

Stadium	Turnover £
Wolverhampton (Monmore)	1,537,935
Slough	1,495,881
South Shields	1,416,567
Romford	1,406,909
Bradford (City)	1,371,466
Reading (Oxford Road)	1,371,280
Cardiff (Arms Park)	1,365,551
Rochester & Chatham	1,282,828
Birmingham (Kings Heath)	1,227,928
Sunderland	1,213,311
Southend-on-Sea	1,209,997
Leeds (Elland Road)	1,167,103
Portsmouth	1,108,662
Newcastle (White City)	1,106,242
Hull (Old Craven Park)	1,090,993
Norwich (Boundary Park)	1,080,438
Stoke-on-Trent (Hanley)	1,055,630
Gloucester & Cheltenham	1,054,899
Oxford	1,044,320
Plymouth	1,020,472
Chester	893,297
Glasgow (Firhill)	880,368
Ashington (Co Durham)	872,132
Preston	866,144
Liverpool (Breck Park)	863,354
Derby	858,056
Stoke-on-Trent (Cobridge)	806,889
Exeter (County Ground)	801,036
London (Stratford)	776,990
Stanley (Co Durham)	750,765
Norwich (City)	750,553
Bristol (Knowle)	736,909
West Hartlepool	709,963
Bolton	666,751
Middlesbrough	656,386
Long Eaton	638,438
Sheffield (Hyde Park)	625,084
Ipswich	594,645
Warrington	570,718
Rochdale	566,976
Newport	537,334
Blackburn	529,773

Stadium	Turnover £
Exeter (Marsh Barton)	516,285
Willenhall	491,794
Stockport (Hazel Grove)	469,889
Aberdeen	452,160
Houghton-le-Spring	445,222
Ayr (Tams Brig)	350,427
Easington (Co Durham)	317,923
Wallyford (East Lothian)	312,573
Luton	308,810
London (Southall)	300,049
Wigan (Poolstock)	288,964
Falkirk (Brockville Park)	218,962
London (Harlington Corner)	206,468
Leeds (Parkside)	200,587
Northampton	193,859
Coundon (Co Durham)	189,456
St Helens	182,523
Kilmarnock	168,564
Ramsgate (Dumpton Park)	168,502
Ramsgate (Newington)	168,502
Workington	155,316
Rotherham	150,428
Oldham	145,712
Wishaw (North Lanarks)	140,967
Kingskerswell (Devon)	135,304
Edinburgh (Stenhouse)	127,549
Glasgow (Mount Vernon)	123,451
Aldershot	99,709
Glasgow (Coatbridge)	83,773
Doncaster (Spotbrough)	76,241
Motherwell (Clyde Valley)	70,732
Barry	64,791
Wombwell (South Yorks)	64,255
Wakefield	51,799
Irvine (Caledonian)	47,041
Aberdare	36,028
Worksop	30,326
Thornton (Fife)	27,342
Castleford (Whitwood)	26,959
Belmont (Co Durham)	23,181
Yarmouth	12,392

Summary

Country	No of tracks (with tote)	Turnover
England	101	£ 178,607,332
Wales	3	£ 1,466,370
Scotland	18	£ 16,357,728
Total	122	£ 196,431,430
