= 1965 UK & Ireland Greyhound Racing Year =

The 1965 UK & Ireland Greyhound Racing Year was the 40th year of greyhound racing in the United Kingdom and the 39th year of greyhound racing in Ireland.

== Roll of honour ==
Major Winners
Award	Name of Winner
1965 English Greyhound Derby	Hack up Chieftain
1965 Irish Greyhound Derby	Ballyowen Chief
1965 Scottish Greyhound Derby	Clonmannon Flash
1965 Welsh Greyhound Derby	Harmony
Greyhound Trainer of the Year	Jim Hookway & John Bassett
Greyhound of the Year	Clonmannon Flash
Irish Greyhound of the Year	Ballyowen Chief

== Summary ==
The industry experienced a small rise in attendances and totalisator turnover for the first time since 1946. The National Greyhound Racing Club (NGRC) affiliated tracks saw 11,213,730 paying customers at 5972 meetings with tote turnover of £58,480,219. However the possibility of future increases was unlikely because there was competition from television, which had found its way into many of Britain's households, bingo halls (a recent gambling rival) which was now established and dance halls pulled in the younger generation. In addition many companies that owned tracks had evaluated that selling them for redevelopment brought large short term financial gain, especially in major cities.

== Tracks ==
Staines Greyhound Stadium was demolished, five years after closing and the Mexborough greyhound track called the Dog Daisy Stadium, which was situated on the corner of Sedgefield Way and Harlington Road also shut. Seaforth Greyhound Stadium closed on 31 December. Romford Stadium Ltd sold their controlling interest in the Dagenham Greyhound Stadium track for £185,000 stating that government restrictions on fixtures forced both tracks to race on the same day which impacted attendances. Incidentally The Dagenham Coup court case continued.

== News ==
On 25 January Juvenile champion Hi Joe trained by Noreen Collin and owned by bookmaker Victor Chandler Sr. was stolen from his Epping kennels. Initial hopes were that he could be recovered quickly to allow him to line up for the English Greyhound Derby but as the weeks passed he had not been recovered.

John Sutton became the Managing Director of the Greyhound Racing Association and the GRA extended its board by adding Major Percy Brown, John Cearns (son of WJ Cearns) and Charles Chandler Jr. to the directors. They then sold the Kingsfurze breeding establishment at Naas in County Kildare, the seven acre grounds had been breeding greyhounds for over 17 years. This was followed by the sale of Upper Childown Farm and Fan Court Farm grounds in Longcross near Chertsey. The two properties were used as a nursery and rearing establishment by the GRA. Further cutbacks by the GRA included the sacking of two advertising executives and five trainers from the Hook Estate and Kennels. Harry Buck, Dick Clark, Albert Jonas, Eric Hiscock and Jack Cooper all left while the remaining ten Hook Kennels trainers would cover the three tracks of White City Greyhounds, Harringay Stadium and Stamford Bridge Greyhounds. The Chairman and Directors were rewarded for their work by gaining a significant rise, doubling their salaries, which was deferred until 1966.

Track Chromatography (a drug testing unit) was first used at Walthamstow in their purpose built lab. Leading owner, the 70 year old shipping magnate Noel Purvis retired after forty years owning greyhounds, he rated Mile Bush Pride as his greatest greyhound.

== Ireland ==
Des Hanrahan became Chairman of the Bord na gCon and actively sought to buy any Irish tracks in danger of being sold to developers.

At the seaside resort of Ballybunion in County Kerry, Matt Sullivan finally received a licence to open Ballybunion Greyhound Stadium despite having to go to court against the Bord na gCon, who had reservations that it was too close to the Kingdom Greyhound Stadium in Tralee.

A litter whelped in February 1965, at the kennels of Leo Stack at Duagh, County Kerry, would become one of the greatest litters in the history of track racing. The litter, of five dogs and four bitches, was by Crazy Parachute out of Supreme Witch and included Forward Flash (a black dog), Forward King (a fawn dog), Spectre II and Tric-Trac (two black dogs) and Gezira (a fawn bitch).

== Competitions ==
The Grand Prix at Walthamstow Stadium is cancelled for the second year in succession due to problems over filling the event. Walthamstow had applied for a change to 700 yards at late notice but it is refused by the NGRC. They will however apply for a longer distance the following year and be successful. Conna Count, a white and brindle dog became the fourth greyhound to successfully defend the Laurels at Wimbledon Stadium for a new increased prize of £1,500.

Clonmannon Flash, the Jim Hookway trained greyhound won the Scottish Greyhound Derby, Northern Flat, Edinburgh Cup, Pall Mall Stakes, Gimcrack and Stewards' Cup. He subsequently received the accolade of Greyhound of the Year at the end of year awards held at the Dorchester Hotel.

== Principal UK races ==
Grand National, White City (April 24 525y h, £500)
Pos	Name of Greyhound	Trainer	SP	Time	Trap
1st	Im Crazy	Randy Singleton	11-4	29.60	4
2nd	Killouragh Course	Adam Jackson	8-1	30.24	1
3rd	Gladstone Mark	Jim Singleton	9-1	30.30	6
4th	Tact	Nora Gleeson	9-1	30.32	5
5th	Bolshoi Prince	Phil Rees Sr.	2-1f	30.56	2
6th	Chantillys Fawn Lace	Jimmy Clubb	4-1	30.64	3

BBC Sportsview TV Trophy Wimbledon (Apr 28, 880y, £1,000)
Pos	Name of Greyhound	Trainer	SP	Time	Trap
1st	Lucky Hi There	Jimmy Jowett	13-8f	51.35	2
2nd	Conna Jester	Tony Dennis	100-7	51.41	5
3rd	What About This	S Brennan	11-2	51.44	3
4th	Boothroyden Flash	Harry Bamford	3-1	51.50	1
5th	Fatal Result		8-1	51.82	6
6th	Boothroyden Larry	Harry Bamford	4-1	51.83	4

Gold Collar, Catford (May 15, 570y, £1,000)
Pos	Name of Greyhound	Trainer	SP	Time	Trap
1st	Friday Morning	Ron Chamberlain	11-10f	33.73	6
2nd	Clifden Orbit	Tom Johnston Jr.	5-1	34.17	3
3rd	Automation	Phil Rees Sr.	3-1	34.23	5
4th	Lucky Monforte	John Bassett	11-2	34.39	1
5th	Speed Rue	R.Dalton	9-2	34.75	4
N/R	Mercedes Star	Paddy Keane			2

Welsh Derby, Arms Park (Jul 3, 525y £500)
Pos	Name of Greyhound	Trainer	SP	Time	Trap
1st	Harmony	Jim Irving	3-1	29.43	1
2nd	Creggan Bush	Reg Webb	6-4f	29.59	6
3rd	Bernies Fire		7-1	29.73	5
4th	Tact	Nora Gleeson	12-1	29.99	2
5th	Cons Prince	Lionel Maxen	14-1	30.15	3
6th	Venture Again	Dave Geggus	5-2	30.18	4

Oaks, Harringay (Jul 5, 525y, £1,000)
Pos	Name of Greyhound	Trainer	SP	Time	Trap
1st	Marjone	Mick O'Toole	4-1	29.37	6
2nd	Geddys Empress	Bill Kelly	2-7f	29.53	1
3rd	Shancloon Lady	Stan Gudgin	8-1	29.54	3
4th	Carols Champion	Johnny Bullock	20-1	29.78	4
5th	Miss Taft	Bob Burls	20-1	29.80	5
6th	Extra Smart		50-1	30.20	2

Scurry Gold Cup, Clapton (Jul 17, 400y £1,000)
Pos	Name of Greyhound	Trainer	SP	Time	Trap
1st	After You	John Bassett	7-1	22.47	1
2nd	Cassildo (dead-heat)	Ron Chamberlain	5-1	22.87	2
2nd	Faithful Hope (dead-heat)	Paddy Keane	5-2jf	22.87	3
4th	Orphan Swan	Paddy McEvoy	9-2	23.07	6
5th	Bank Note	Paddy Power	14-1	23.55	5
6th	Ballinasloe Fred	Bill Kelly	5-2jf	23.69	4

Laurels, Wimbledon (Aug 13, 500y, £1,500)
Pos	Name of Greyhound	Trainer	SP	Time	Trap
1st	Conna Count	Paddy McEvoy	11-2	28.13	4
2nd	Venture Again	Dave Geggus	1-1f	28.23	5
3rd	Charlie Caesar	Stan Martin	7-1	28.27	1
4th	Chittering Clapton	Adam Jackson	5-1	28.35	2
5th	Lucky Private		20-1	28.36	3
6th	Sapphire Prince	Jimmy Fletcher	4-1	28.37	6

Scottish Greyhound Derby, Carntyne (Sep 4, 525y, £1,000)
Pos	Name of Greyhound	Trainer	SP	Time	Trap
1st	Clonmannon Flash	Jim Hookway	2-1f	29.00	6
2nd	O'Leary	Jim Hookway	6-1	29.12	5
3rd	Olivers Leader		8-1	29.15	3
4th	Kilbeg Kuda	John Bassett	6-1	29.16	4
5th	Flash Solar	Stan Mitchell	4-1	29.24	1
6th	Chittering Clapton	Adam Jackson	5-2	29.25	2

St Leger, Wembley (Sep 6, 700y, £1,250)
Pos	Name of Greyhound	Trainer	SP	Time	Trap
1st	Greenane Flash	Jimmy Quinn	2-1	40.13	6
2nd	Claudyne	John Brown	13-8f	40.21	1
3rd	Suir View II	Tom Johnston Jr.	5-1	40.31	4
4th	Joystick	Harry Bamford	20-1	40.41	5
5th	Ringulator	Jimmy Jowett	9-2	40.49	2
6th	Adamstown Toast		10-1	40.65	3

Cesarewitch, West Ham (Oct 8, 600y, £1,500)
Pos	Name of Greyhound	Trainer	SP	Time	Trap
1st	Lucky Montforte	John Bassett	5-1	33.00	1
2nd	Faithful Hope	Paddy Keane	4-5f	33.04	3
3rd	Greenane Flame	Jack Harvey	16-1	33.44	5
4th	Lucky Arrow II	Peter Collett	7-1	33.46	4
5th	Motor Now	Tom Johnston Jr.	5-2	33.54	2
6th	Clifden Orbit	Tom Johnston Jr.	16-1	33.74	6

== Totalisator returns ==
Extended content

The totalisator returns declared to the licensing authorities for the year 1965 are listed below.

Stadium	Turnover £
London (White City)	5,415,369
London (Harringay)	3,496,197
London (Wimbledon)	3,150,990
London (Walthamstow)	2,913,718
London (Wembley)	2,505,145
London (Catford)	2,030,731
London (Clapton)	1,965,500
London (West Ham)	1,854,887
Manchester (Belle Vue)	1,834,078
London (Wandsworth)	1,778,071
London (New Cross)	1,372,102
London (Hendon)	1,347,031
Romford	1,282,457
London (Stamford Bridge)	1,275,368
Birmingham (Perry Barr, old)	1,219,632
Edinburgh (Powderhall)	1,193,969
Manchester (White City)	1,146,295
London (Hackney)	1,081,582
Glasgow (Shawfield)	1,080,310

Stadium	Turnover £
Brighton & Hove	991,959
London (Park Royal)	950,507
Birmingham (Hall Green)	923,625
Glasgow (White City)	887,241
Slough	819,895
Leeds (Elland Road)	757,118
Sheffield (Owlerton)	732,336
Southend-on-Sea	722,286
Manchester (Salford)	715,087
Newcastle (Brough Park)	707,159
Wolverhampton (Monmore)	705,836
Bristol (Eastville)	680,701
Crayford & Bexleyheath	673,742
Willenhall	648,176
Newcastle (Gosforth)	619,462
Cardiff (Arms Park)	576,908
Birmingham (Kings Heath)	567,888
Reading (Oxford Road)	549,249
Bradford (Greenfield)	539,608

Stadium	Turnover £
Gloucester & Cheltenham	535,785
Ramsgate (Dumpton Park)	522,651
Liverpool (White City)	498,134
Glasgow (Carntyne)	465,557
Derby	460,975
Poole	419,305
Rochester & Chatham	385,533
Oxford	362,050
Gateshead	342,751
Middlesbrough	328,571
Liverpool (Seaforth)	295,851
Leicester (Blackbird Rd)	291,283
Hull (Old Craven Park)	290,437
Nottingham (White City)	289,003
Portsmouth	286,792
Aberdeen	278,707
Preston	253,309
South Shields	202,255
Norwich (City)	159,055
