= 1945 UK & Ireland Greyhound Racing Year =

The 1945 UK & Ireland Greyhound Racing Year was the 20th year of greyhound racing in the United Kingdom and the 19th year of greyhound racing in Ireland.

== Roll of honour ==
Major Winners
Award	Name of Winner
1945 English Greyhound Derby	Ballyhennessy Seal
1945 Irish Greyhound Derby	Lilac Luck
1945 Scottish Greyhound Derby	Mondays Son
1945 Welsh Greyhound Derby	Shaggy Lass

== Summary ==
The Second World War came to an end in Europe on 8 May, leaving time for the industry to complete a full racing schedule. This included a return of the 1945 English Greyhound Derby that was won by Ballyhennessy Seal.

Attendances and totalisator turnover for NGRC tracks reached record highs, with over 50 million paying customers going through the turnstiles. It was also announced that the NGRC tracks had earned the government £120,000 for war charities during the duration. Annual totalisator turnover nearly doubled to 137,715,273 (a phenomenal sum in 1945).

The leading greyhound company, the Greyhound Racing Association (GRA) recorded a record profit of £1,616,000 but £1,230,000 of that was allocated for the liability of excess profit tax and National Defence Contribution. The annual report indicated that greyhound racing had served service and industrial workers with a form of relaxation and thereby creating a very substantial contribution to the war effort but warned that much improvement was required to its racetracks to replace damage from the past six years.

Other tracks reported even worse deductions with the Daily Herald reporting that Wandsworth Stadium Ltd (the company that owned the track) was subject to over 97% government tax deductions. Sidney Parkes the owner of the company revealed that gross profit was £430,000 of which £420,000 was taken by the government in various taxes leaving just £10,000 net profit. He stated "What a money making proposition dog racing is to the Labour government."

=== Tracks ===
Reg Perkins (a farming and transport businessman) and George Ellingworth (a garage owner) purchased Peterborough Greyhound Stadium and quickly began to improve facilities.

=== Competitions ===
In addition to the Derby, Ballyhennessy Seal won the Gold Collar at Catford Stadium after a seven length final victory, he also won his heat and semi-final by eight lengths. Nicknamed The Seal, he headed for the Laurels at Wimbledon Stadium and after progressing through the competition with ease, it was reported that he was suffering from rheumatism in his hind legs and he was not responding to treatment. He was withdrawn and retired to stud.

The Grand Prix held its first ever running in November 1945; the event at Walthamstow Stadium would eventually become a classic race. Derby finalist Magic Bohemian won the event for Leslie Reynolds and another Derby finalist Celtic Chief also made the final. Coventry trainer George McKay experienced success with Robeen Printer after winning the St Leger. The fawn bitch had arrived in England with a good reputation following a victory in the Irish Laurels and was bought for a record 1,650 guineas, for a bitch, by the Sanderson's, owners of Coventry stadium.

Earlier in the year at Eastville Stadium, during the final of the Golden Crest, Shannon Shore had won by ten lengths in a new World Record for 500 yards of 28.76 sec. The Welsh Derby was transferred from White City Stadium, Cardiff to Arms Park following the closure of the former in 1937.

=== News ===
Arthur 'Doc' Callanan died at aged 51 after suffering from ill health in Dublin; his legacy was closely linked to the success of Mick the Miller and a new competition was named in his memory at Harold's Cross Stadium, called the Callanan Cup. White City became the first track to install a photo finish camera. Magic Beau, a litter brother to the £2,500 acquisition Magic Bohemian, died in the Wembley kennels during December, the fawn and white dog had recently broken the Wembley 525 track record.

=== Ireland ===
Shaggy Lad, at odds of 1-10f won the Irish Puppy Derby final defeating Quare Times by 10 lengths. The fawn dog became the first greyhound to break 28 seconds at Harold's Cross when breaking the track record in the semi-final by recording 27.96. He duly won the final in 27.98.

== Principal UK races ==
Gold Collar, Catford (Jun 9, 440y)
Pos	Name of Greyhound	Trainer	SP	Time	Trap
1st	Ballyhennessy Seal	Stan Martin	9-4	25.45	3
2nd	Restorer	Sidney Orton	2-1f	26.01	1
3rd	Celtic Chief	William Mills	10-1	26.17	5
4th	Tanimon	Jerry Hannafin	9-4	26.19	2
5th	Duffys Arrival	George McKay	25-1	26.23	4
6th	Tall Rally	Eastville	50-1	26.55	6

Scottish Greyhound Derby, Carntyne (Jun 30, 525y, £250)
Pos	Name of Greyhound	Trainer	SP	Time	Trap
1st	Monday's Son	P Moore	5-2jf	29.19	6
2nd	Benmadigan	Brough Park	16-1	29.43	4
3rd	Alvaston Lulu Belle	Ken Newham	5-2jf	29.44	5
4th	Joves Reminder	Cornelius Crowley	3-1	29.60	3
5th	Brilliant Leader	P Moore	8-1	29.68	2
6th	Blarney Bride	Clapton	8-1	29.84	1

Scurry Gold Cup, Clapton (Jul 28, 400y £500)
Pos	Name of Greyhound	Trainer	SP	Time	Trap
1st	Country Life	Paddy McEllistrim	10-1	23.50	3
2nd	Wandering Lad	George McKay	100-6	23.58	5
3rd	Monday's Son	P Moore	6-4f	23.62	2
4th	Cockeyed Cutlet	Jack Harvey	7-2	23.66	6
5th	Netties Ranger	Charles Cross	15-8	23.82	1
N/R	Joves Reminder	Cornelius Crowley			

Welsh Derby, Arms Park (Jul 28, 525y, £200)
Pos	Name of Greyhound	Trainer	SP	Time	Trap
1st	Shaggy Lass	G.H.Vickery	4-5f	29.75	1
2nd	Duffys Arrival	George McKay	1-1	29.81	6
3rd	Captured Den		25-1	29.85	5
4th	Dearly Beloved		100-7	30.09	2
5th	Bomb Damage		40-1	30.33	4
6th	The Real McCoy	Bill Doolan	100-7	30.73	3

Laurels, Wimbledon (Aug 25, 500y, £500)
Pos	Name of Greyhound	Trainer	SP	Time	Trap
1st	Burhill Moon	Sidney Orton	1-3f	28.42	3
2nd	Country Life	Paddy McEllistrim	10-1	28.46	4
3rd	Race Day	Ivy Regan	100-6	28.78	6
4th	Lookout Post	Wembley	8-1	29.26	5
5th	Wandering Lad	George McKay	10-1	29.58	1
N/R	Shannon Shore	Leslie Reynolds			

St Leger, Wembley (Sep 22, 700y, £500)
Pos	Name of Greyhound	Trainer	SP	Time	Trap
1st	Robeen Printer	George McKay	2-5f	40.03	6
2nd	Cherrys Equal	Walthamstow	11-4	40.31	3
3rd	Ryans Rofe		100-7	40.43	2
4th	Girlie O'Connor		100-7	40.49	1
5th	Mountjoy Square	Newcastle	100-7	40.61	5
N/R	Rushton Paul	Jerry Hannafin			

Oaks, White City (Oct 20, 525y)
Pos	Name of Greyhound	Trainer	SP	Time	Trap
1st	Prancing Kitty	Paddy Fortune	13-8	29.54	3
2nd	Robeen Printer	George McKay	11-8f	29.70	4
3rd	Trevs Fashion	Fred Trevillion	7-1	29.72	2
4th	Swanky Ration		20-1	29.88	1
5th	Cassas Spot Lights		5-1	30.04	5
N/R	Lady Grosvenor				

The Grand Prix Walthamstow (Nov 10, 525y)
Pos	Name of Greyhound	Trainer	SP	Time	Trap
1st	Magic Bohemian	Leslie Reynolds	10-11f	30.05	2
2nd	Keel Hackie	Jim Syder Sr.	6-1	30.37	4
3rd	Overtime	Paddy Fortune	10-1	30.53	3
4th	Bradwell Cutlet	Jack Harvey	7-1	30.69	1
5th	Celtic Chief	William Mills	12-1	30.85	5
6th	Good as Gold II	F Deathbridge	9-2	31.09	6

Cesarewitch, West Ham (Dec 29, 550y, £500)
Pos	Name of Greyhound	Trainer	SP	Time	Trap
1st	Hurry Kitty	William Mills	5-4f	31.26	5
2nd	Gala Flash	C Lee	5-2	31.98	3
3rd	Burhill Moon	Sidney Orton	7-2	32.02	4
4th	Kilcora Master		25-1	32.42	6
5th	Prancing Kitty	Paddy Fortune	8-1	32.46	1
6th	Lights Conceited		50-1	32.78	2

== Totalisator Returns ==
Extended content

The totalisator returns declared to the licensing authorities for the year 1945 are listed below. Tracks that did not have a totalisator in operation are not listed.

Stadium	Turnover £
London (White City)	13,479,412
London (Wembley)	7,976,384
London (Harringay)	7,935,367
London (Wimbledon)	5,815,527
London (Walthamstow)	5,366,513
London (Clapton)	3,918,648
London (Stamford Bridge)	3,680,966
London (Catford)	3,617,372
London (Wandsworth)	3,286,551
Birmingham (Perry Barr, old)	3,266,682
Glasgow (Shawfield)	2,919,380
Manchester (Belle Vue)	2,884,864
London (Park Royal)	2,534,168
London (New Cross)	2,468,997
London (Hackney)	1,968,866
Birmingham (Hall Green)	1,914,697
Bradford (Greenfield)	1,902,256
Brighton & Hove	1,793,940
Coventry (Lythalls Lane)	1,708,153
Glasgow (White City)	1,705,239
London (Hendon)	1,695,935
Bristol (Eastville)	1,676,874
Newcastle (Brough Park)	1,665,313
Manchester (Salford)	1,648,322
Sheffield (Owlerton)	1,641,206
Glasgow (Albion)	1,613,415
Leicester (Blackbird Rd)	1,605,8307
Edinburgh (Powderhall)	1,578,156
Glasgow (Carntyne)	1,554,073
Crayford & Bexleyheath	1,307,377
Sheffield (Darnall)	1,302,954
London (Dagenham)	1,295,066
London (Charlton)	1,279,410

Stadium	Turnover £
Nottingham (White City)	1,235,825
Wolverhampton (Monmore)	1,220,595
Gateshead	1,218,313
Newcastle (Gosforth)	1,117,734
Cardiff (Arms Park)	1,116,602
Liverpool (Stanley)	1,112,331
Birmingham (Kings Heath)	1,045,019
Blackpool (St Anne's)	1,004,572
Liverpool (Seaforth)	951,523
Romford	951,011
Reading (Oxford Road)	915,195
Norwich (Boundary Park)	911,831
Gloucester & Cheltenham	908,002
Manchester (White City)	891,503
Southampton	880,980
Slough	854,889
Hull (Old Craven Park)	841,469
Leeds (Elland Road)	841,100
Plymouth	838,453
Sunderland	812,291
Bradford (City)	812,065
Rochester & Chatham	811,044
Newcastle (White City)	753,953
Portsmouth	744,735
Liverpool (White City)	726,440
Ashington (Co Durham)	705,074
South Shields	651,274
Stanley (Co Durham)	596,337
Stoke-on-Trent (Hanley)	585,560
Exeter (County Ground)	543,842
Stoke-on-Trent (Cobridge)	539,623
Norwich (City)	534,157
Bristol (Knowle)	526,342

Stadium	Turnover £
Middlesbrough	480,284
Newport	469,850
Glasgow (Firhill)	468,398
Ipswich	460,562
London (West Ham)	454,336
Exeter (Marsh Barton)	432,925
Bolton	429,744
Warrington	403,406
Preston	394,118
Rochdale	370,605
Houghton-le-Spring	368,138
Sheffield (Hyde Park)	364,626
West Hartlepool	343,441
Long Eaton	301,800
Easington (Co Durham)	227,019
Luton	224,505
London (Southall)	219,994
Oxford	214,138
London (Stratford)	200,194
Coundon (Co Durham)	161,175
Falkirk (Brockville Park)	128,649
Aldershot	104,129
Rotherham	92,421
Leeds (Parkside)	83,345
Doncaster (Spotbrough)	76,193
Kingskerswell (Devon)	55,138
Wombwell (South Yorks)	40,715
Thornton (Fife)	32,710
Worksop	25,922
Stockport (Hazel Grove)	21,669
Castleford (Whitwood)	20,124

Summary

Area	Turnover
London	£ 69,452,094
Rest of England	£ 55,876,707
Wales	£ 1,586,452
Scotland	£ 10,800,020
Total	£ 137,715,273
