= Guineas (greyhounds) =

UK greyhound competition

The Guineas
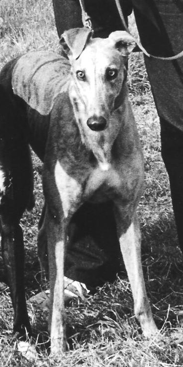
- Master Hardy, 1986 champion
- Location: Various
- Inaugurated: 1939
- Final run: 2010

The Guineas originally called the One Thousand Guineas was a greyhound racing competition held annually. It was inaugurated in 1939 at Park Royal Stadium over 400 yards.

Following the closure of Park Royal in 1969 the race switched to Hendon Greyhound Stadium, however there were only three editions at Hendon because the stadium also closed in 1972. In 1973 Hackney Wick Stadium hosted the event, initially over a sprint distance. Hackney introduced the Lead sponsored by William Hill in 1975; at the same time they switched the 1,000 Guineas to a longer distance of 484 metres.

In 1994 Perry Barr Stadium introduced an alternative competition also called the Guineas which effectively replaced the Hackney event because it came to an end in 1995 following the financial troubles at Hackney. Two versions were therefore held during 1994 and 1995. The competition continued to have a journeyman life when it switched to Nottingham Greyhound Stadium in 2003 before ending in 2010.

== Venues and distances ==
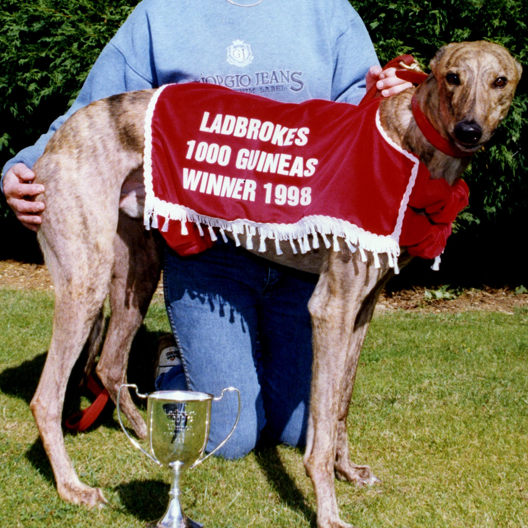
1998 winner Killeacle Tiger

- 1939–1968 (Park Royal, 400 yards)
- 1969–1971 (Hendon, 475 yards)
- 1972–1975 (Hackney, 330 yards)
- 1976–1995 (Hackney, 484 metres)
- 1992–2002 (Perry Barr, 480 metres)
- 2003–2010 (Nottingham, 500 metres)

== Sponsors ==
- 1983–1987 (Mecca)
- 1990–1991 (William Hill)
- 1994–1994 (AR Dennis)
- 1998–2002 (Ladbrokes)
- 2006–2006 (Grolsch)
- 2007–2007 (Carling)
- 2008–2009 (Caffreys)

== Past winners ==
Year	Winner	Breeding	Trainer	Time	SP	Notes
1939	Trev's Despatch	Silver Seal – Lady Moonshine	Johnny Bullock (Catford)	22.70	8-1	
1940	Trev's Despatch	Silver Seal – Lady Moonshine	Johnny Bullock (West Ham)	22.70	5-2f	
1941	Heavy Damages	Village Lawyer – Forest Gypsy	Miss D Thomas (Wandsworth)	23.29	20-1	
1942	Ballynennan Moon	Mr Moon – Banriogan Dann	Sidney Orton (Wimbledon)	22.19	4-11f	
1943	Bou Arada		Jerry Hannafin (Wimbledon)	22.30	3-1	
1944	Rimmells Black	Manhattan Midnight - Drishogue	Stanley Biss (Clapton)	22.14	9-4jf	
1946	Cockeyed Cutlet	Jesmond Cutlet – Bradwell Gypsy	Jack Harvey (Wembley)	22.53	9-2	
1947	Slaney Record	Rare Record – Honey Gale	Jack Toseland (Perry Barr)	22.67	1-2f	
1948	Jack's Arrow	Lone Seal – Border Primrose	Stanley Biss (Clapton)	22.47	10-1	
1949	Laughing Grenadier	Flying Dart – Heart of Liberty	Jack Harvey (Wembley)	22.50	4-1	
1950	Ballycurreen Garrett	Ballycureen Duke – Ballymakeera Keeper	Jack Harvey (Wembley)	22.36	4-5f	
1951	Derryboy Blackbird	Mad Tanist – Swiss Miss	Jack Harvey (Wembley)	22.55	3-1	
1952	Melvalley Buster		Stan Raymond (Gloucester)	22.38	6-1	
1953	Snow White Brown		Henry Parsons (Crayford)	22.51	9-2	
1954	Nine Up	Shaggy Lad – Wimble Lady	Ron Chamberlain (Private)	22.53	7-4f	
1955	Firgrove Slipper	Ballymac Ball - Hannahs Beauty	Jim Syder Jr. (Wembley)	22.73	6-4jf	
1956	No Etiqutte	Leitrim Miller – Rare Sunset	Tom Perry (Private)	22.25	100-7	
1957	Rather Grand	The Grand Champion – Ashbrook Gift	Henry Parsons (Crayford)	22.41	9-2	
1958	Mystic Cure	Small Town – Ladys Cure	Sidney Orton (Wimbledon)	22.45	6-1	
1959	Town Prince	Small Town – Orphan Princess	Leslie Reynolds (Wembley)	22.35	4-1	
1960	Varra Black Nose	Glittering Look – Typhoon Jane	Dennis Hannafin (Wimbledon)	22.58	8-11f	
1961	Gorey Airways	Imperial Airways – Geffs Linnett	Jimmy Jowett (Clapton)	22.33		
1962	Courtly Regent	Dunmore King – Ransom of Court	Gordon Hodson (Private)	22.70		
1963	Shanes Legacy	Knockhill Chieftain - Betsy	Tony Dennis (Private)	22.73		
1964	Nash Surprise	Merville – Ballyvirgin Betty	Jack Harvey (Wembley)	22.94	5-4f	
1965	Chittering Cheapjack	Noted Crusader – Chittering Cindy	Adam Jackson (Clapton)	22.94		
1966	Flashy Paddy	Crazy Parachute - Anjone	Tom Johnston Jr. (West Ham)	22.74		
1967	Cons Duke	Crazy Parachute – Cons Diet	Dave Barker (Private)	22.51		
1968	Public Reply	Dromin Glory – Please Reply	Paddy McEvoy (Wimbledon)	22.31		
1969	Reviewfield King	Oregon Prince – Review Field Queen	Reg Webb (Private)	27.73	6-4f	
1970	Lord Phil	Lucky Wonder - Lachienne	Dennis Mansfield (Southend)	27.81	10-1	
1971	Banogue Tom	Sally's Story – Mines A Mink	Pam Heasman (Private)		6-4f	
1972	Pacific Wonder	Yanka Boy – Clomoney Boy	Eric Adkins (Private)	18.15	3-1	
1973	Na Kwenda	Craggs Flier – Cheeky Meg	Paddy Coughlan (Crayford)	18.22	6-4f	
1974	Money Again	Clomoney Jet – Leades Again	John Coleman (Wembley)	18.35	9-4f	
1975	My Dowry	Handy Valley – Black Highbird	Pam Heasman (Private)	18.15		
1976	London Spec	Spectre II – Hi Lasinagh	Pat Mullins (Private)	29.02	8-11f	
1977	Oulartwick Kybo	Kybo Venture – Little Jane	Johnny Faint (Private)	29.82	7-4f	
1978	Camps Jubilee	Camira Story – Camps Society	Terry Duggan (Romford)	29.48	12-1	
1979	Ashmore Fun	Monalee Champion – Shady Raffle	David Vaas (Private)	29.64	5-2f	
1980	Deel Joker	Free Speech – Leaping Lady	John Gibbons (Crayford)	29.75	5-2f	
1981	Decoy Ranger	Westmead County – Ka Boom	Joe Cobbold Cambridge	29.14	11-2	
1982	Adventure Kit	Liberty Lad – Pink Note	Frank Melville (White City)	29.77	7-4f	
1983	Kylemore Champ	Lindas Champion – Airglooney Lass	Terry Duggan (Romford)	29.47	11-2	
1984	Kampos	Lacca Champion – Kildara Koritsi	Colin McNally (Catford)	29.24	11-8f	
1985	Ballygroman Jim	Knockrour Tiger – Lee View Lady	Ernie Gaskin Sr. (Private)	29.19	2-1	
1986	Master Hardy	Ron Hardy – Sarahs Bunny	Arthur Hitch (Slough)	29.42	4-7f	
1987	Field Road	Sarahs Star – Cool Surprise	Derek Law (Milton Keynes)	29.57	6-1	
1988	Skomal	Cathys Fugitive – Im Chimes	Barry Silkman (Private)	29.78	4-1	
1989	Handsome Dan	Manorville Sand – Scariff Slave	Geoff De Mulder (Norton Canes)	29.63	2-1	
1990	Hello Blackie	Daleys Gold – Ashcarne Chips	Roger York (Hackney)	29.68	4-1	
1991	Taringa Bay	Kyle Jack – Nans Brute	Eric Jordan (Hove)	29.52	7-1	
1992	Einstein	Manorville Major – Lucky Vein	John Gibbons (Catford)	29.43	8-1	
1993	Stylefield Law	Darragh Commet – Shenick Lady	Natalie Savva (Milton Keynes)	30.54	7-1	
1994	Lemon Rob	Daleys Gold – Lemon Miss	John McGee Sr. (Hackney)	29.47	6-1	Hackney
1994	Telford Boy	Penny Less – Fawn Music	B Wilkinson (Perry Barr)	30.12	11-8f	Perry Barr
1995	Staplers Jo	Dempsey Duke – Perfect Rhythm	Nick Savva (Walthamstow)	28.98	2-9f	Hackney
1997	Swift Bravo	Fionntra Highway – Trout Rocket	Stuart Buckland (Hall Green)	30.34	7-4jf	
1998	Killeacle Tiger	Coalbrook Tiger – Garry Bond	Gilly Hepden (Oxford)	29.37	11-2	
1999	Dunmurry Move	Right Move – Chairhill Daisy	Mary Kimberley (Perry Barr)	29.42	4-1	
2000	Soviet Ferrari	Come on Ranger – Soviet Atlantic	Stuart Buckland (Hall Green)	29.38	7-2	
2001	Henryaliemma	Shanless Slippy – Milton Park	Davie Freeman (Private)	29.11	3-1	
2002	Lemon Laser	Vintage Prince – Lemon Python	Paul Foster (Swindon)	29.09	5-1	
2004	Sound Sense	Split the Bill – Little Violet	Barrie Draper (Sheffield)	30.53	6-1	
2005	Slick Kid	Top Honcho – Warren Swift	Michael McCool (Private)	30.51	12-1	
2006	Driving Up Rob	Droopys Vieri – Town Band	Paul Sallis (Hall Green)	30.53	7-1	
2007	Breeze Hill Juli	Larkhill Jo – Toss Stella	Pat Rosney (Monmore)	30.23	8-1	
2008	Vigorous Pat	Droopys Vieri – Frisby Fizz	Geraldine Kovac (Perry Barr)	30.50	11-4	
2009	Outandgoodnight	Honcho Classic – Droopys Perlena	Mark Grady (Poole)	30.05	6-4f	
2010	Vigorous Willie	Tyrur Ted – Frisby Fizz	Geraldine Kovac (Perry Barr)	30.50	8-1	
