= 1977 UK & Ireland Greyhound Racing Year =

The 1977 UK & Ireland Greyhound Racing Year was the 52nd year of greyhound racing in the United Kingdom and the 51st year of greyhound racing in Ireland.

== Roll of honour ==
Major Winners
Award	Name of Winner
1977 English Greyhound Derby	Balliniska Band
1977 Irish Greyhound Derby	Linda's Champion
1977 Scottish Greyhound Derby	Amber Sky
1977 Welsh Greyhound Derby	Instant Gambler
Greyhound Trainer of the Year	Ted Dickson
Greyhound of the Year	Balliniska Band
Irish Greyhound of the Year	Lindas Champion
Trainers Championship	Geoff De Mulder & Natalie Savva

== Summary ==
The National Greyhound Racing Club (NGRC) released the annual returns, with totalisator turnover up, at £70,685,971 and attendances up, recorded at 6,685,491 from 5847 meetings.

Balliniska Band, a white and black dog trained by Eddie Moore was voted the Greyhound of the Year after winning the 1977 English Greyhound Derby. A new competition was created called the Trainers Championship; this involved a series of races during one race meeting, between the top six trainers from the previous year. The selection criteria consisted of the leading open race winning trainers and in the inaugural event at Brough Park there was a tie between Natalie Savva and Geoff De Mulder.

== Tracks ==
The Welsh Rugby Union required extended terracing at the National Stadium, which resulted in Cardiff City Council announcing a revamp of Cardiff Arms Park that did not include greyhound racing. The last Welsh Greyhound Derby was held on 9 July and the last meeting on 30 July. Instant Gambler won the last Derby and Lillyput Queen, owned by Cardiff butcher Malcolm Davies and trained by Freddie Goodman, won the last race to be held at the track. Cardiff City Council had taken less than ten minutes to reject a plan to switch greyhound racing to nearby Maindy Stadium. Only three flapping (unlicensed) independent tracks remained in Wales at Swansea, Bedwellty and Ystrad Mynach. Harry George secretary of Greyhound Company Cardiff failed in a bid for Oxford Stadium following Cardiff's closure and Denis Diffley a London businessman also failed in a 21 year lease bid leaving Oxford close to permanent closure.

Coatbridge reopened and in the East of England a new consortium headed by Tom Stanley and Billy Davis took over Ipswich Stadium.

Walthamstow Stadium's future was put in doubt, Charles Chandler Sr. had died the previous year, which resulted in Charles Chandler Jr. becoming Chairman and Percy Chandler becoming Managing Director. Victor Chandler Jr. had owned 20% stake in the track since 1974 but wanted to sell his share due to the fact that his side of the family was concerned with the bookmaking business. The Greyhound Racing Association (GRA) also held a third share in the track but had to sell to alleviate their debts in January. Suddenly it became apparent that an interested party could acquire a 52% stake in the track and have the controlling interest, it led to a clambering from major players looking to buy Walthamstow. Corals and Ladbrokes both expressed an interest but the Chandler family rallied round, Charles Jr., Percy and Frances (wife of Charles Sr.) spent over £400,000 to withstand the attempts from Corals and Ladbrokes and buy the track outright. Meanwhile another bookmaking firm Hills discussed the possibility of taking over GRA and its £18.4 million debt.

== News ==
The GRA heavily in debt were forced to sell their 23% stake in Coral Leisure to alleviate the debt.

Allied Breweries with their Skol and Britvic labels became major race sponsors. Eastville Stadium staged speedway with the bikes using the actual greyhound circuit to race on, it was then re-laid each time. Crayford staged their first meeting on sand, the cost and difficulty of obtaining the peat being the main reason for the switch to sand. Hurdler Try it Blackie, retired after 46 open race wins and 129 races, trained by Frank Melville he was bought for just 48 guineas at Hackney sales. The black dog had reached the 1975 Grand National final.

Hall Green Racing Manager Jeff Jefcoate left the GRA for Northern Sports and the Ramsgate track also introduced a new race called The Thanet Gold Cup and a new tote system called Digico. Former Manchester United footballer Charlie Mitten was appointed Assistant Racing Manager at White City. Scurry Gold Cup finalist Fiano was killed in a vehicle accident on the way back to the Hook Estate and Kennels after the race.

Trainer John Bassett retired from training for a second time to concentrate on breeding and rearing. John Gibbons persuaded Lewisham council to lease him space where the old New Cross Kennels used to exist. The site which was a mass of rubble was cleared by Gibbons and his team to make way for kennels and a schooling track. Trainer Peter Hawkesley died aged only 51.

== Ireland ==
Dunmore Stadium was on the verge of closure due to continuing troubles in Northern Ireland, but was saved when a local consortium stepped in. The group including Jim Delargy and bookmaker Sean Graham acquired a majority shareholding in the Belfast Celtic Football & Athletic Company which also owned Celtic Park greyhounds. Investment at Dunmore was initiated with immediate effect and prize money was doubled and new kennels were built. Their attention was then turned to Celtic Park for the same reason.

The Irish Derby trial stakes which were held all over Ireland, had failed to date to produce an ultimate winner of the Irish Greyhound Derby but in 1977 the Kilkenny trial stakes winner Lindas Champion won the 1977 Irish Greyhound Derby. He had entered the stake for just £5 and duly gained a free entry to the competition by winning the Kilkenny heat.

The McKenna family training empire continued to build after Gay McKenna's daughter Paula married Fraser Black.

Nine tracks in Ireland are closed for five weeks following a strike by staff over pay.

== Principal UK races ==
BBC TV Trophy, Walthamstow (Mar 23, 820m, £1,500)
Pos	Name of Greyhound	Trainer	SP	Time	Trap
1st	Montreen	Harry Bamford	13-2	52.40	1
2nd	Bonzo	George Curtis	7-1	52.52	4
3rd	Sindys Flame	John Honeysett	2-5f	52.56	6
4th	Fountain Valley		16-1	52.76	5
5th	Dear Charmer	Ken Reynolds	66-1	53.00	2
6th	Tell You What		20-1	53.20	3

Grand National, White City (April 9 500m h, £1,500)
Pos	Name of Greyhound	Trainer	SP	Time	Trap
1st	Salerno	John Coleman	5-4f	30.65	2
2nd	Out All Night	Joe Pickering	10-1	30.79	3
3rd	Hes A Dear	Tom Foster	6-4	30.82	6
4th	Maythorn View	Randy Singleton	5-1	30.98	4
5th	Lisfinny Boy		10-1	31.06	1
6th	Meanus Dandy	Joe Pickering	33-1	00.00	5

Scurry Gold Cup, Slough (April 16, 434m, £2,000)
Pos	Name of Greyhound	Trainer	SP	Time	Trap
1st	Wired To Moon	George Curtis	4-1	26.63	3
2nd	Cahurmore Speech	Len White	7-4f	26.73	2
3rd	Xmas Holiday	Phil Rees Sr.	11-4	26.77	1
4th	Lesleys Charm	Ted Dickson	10-1	27.05	6
5th	Cameo Marshall		20-1	27.17	5
6th	Fiano	Adam Jackson	10-1	27.49	4

Laurels, Wimbledon (May 20, 460m, £3,000)
Pos	Name of Greyhound	Trainer	SP	Time	Trap
1st	Greenfield Fox	Ted Dickson	4-5f	27.41	5
2nd	Linacre	Ted Dickson	7-1	27.53	6
3rd	Mutts Silver	Phil Rees Sr.	7-4	27.59	2
4th	Gaily Noble	John Coleman	12-1	27.99	4
5th	Willys Express	R.Clegg	33-1	28.17	3
6th	Kilcolman Stuart	Barbara Tompkins	16-1	28.33	1

Welsh Derby, Arms Park (Jul 9, 500m £1,200)
Pos	Name of Greyhound	Trainer	SP	Time	Trap
1st	Instant Gambler	Barbara Tompkins	1-1f	30.01	2
2nd	Linacre	Ted Dickson	6-4	30.33	5
3rd	Corrigeen Roger	Geoff De Mulder	10-1	30.43	1
4th	Remote Control	Geoff De Mulder	10-1	30.53	4
5th	Vals Son		20-1	30.77	3
6th	Tilbrook Wind	Barbara Tompkins	25-1	30.83	6

Scottish Greyhound Derby, Shawfield (Aug 6, 480m, £3,000)
Pos	Name of Greyhound	Trainer	SP	Time	Trap
1st	Amber Sky	Peter Beaumont	6-4f	29.08	2
2nd	Skilful Boy		7-1	29.12	4
3rd	Derrygrath Charm		10-1	29.28	5
4th	Westmead Special	Natalie Savva	2-1	29.36	1
5th	Kilcolman Stuart	Barbara Tompkins	4-1	29.44	3

St Leger, Wembley (Sep 5, 655m, £5,000)
Pos	Name of Greyhound	Trainer	SP	Time	Trap
1st	Stormy Spirit	Joe Pickering	10-1	40.22	1
2nd	Westmead Melody	Natalie Savva	8-1	40.30	4
3rd	Westpark Kale	Phil Rees Sr.	11-8f	40.38	6
4th	Huberts Consort	Tom Reilly	2-1	40.44	2
5th	City Salesman	Tom Foster	16-1	40.64	5
6th	Spats	Phil Rees Sr.	9-1	00.00	3

Gold Collar, Catford (Sep 24, 555m, £2,000)
Pos	Name of Greyhound	Trainer	SP	Time	Trap
1st	Westmead Power	Natalie Savva	11-4	34.98	1
2nd	El Cavalier	Ted Griffin	9-4	35.30	6
3rd	Coolmona Nell	Phil Rees Sr.	8-1	35.36	3
4th	Black Legend	Ted Dickson	7-4f	35.54	5
5th	Findon Venture	George Carr	16-1	35.60	2
6th	Attila	John Honeysett	7-1	35.68	4

Cesarewitch, Belle Vue (Oct 8, 815m, £2,000)
Pos	Name of Greyhound	Trainer	SP	Time	Trap
1st	Montrean	Harry Bamford	4-6f	51.64	1
2nd	Langford Dacoit	George Curtis	7-2	51.65	4
3rd	Westpark Kale	John Coleman	7-2	51.73	6
4th	Hard Fact		20-1	51.76	2
5th	Westmead Fun	Natalie Savva	14-1	52.00	5
6th	Westown Adam	Natalie Savva	6-1	52.03	3

The Grand Prix, Walthamstow (Oct 22, 640m, £2,500)
Pos	Name of Greyhound	Trainer	SP	Time	Trap
1st	Paradise Spectre	Pat Mullins	6-4f	40.19	4
2nd	Stormy Spirit	Joe Pickering	3-1	40.25	1
3rd	Lyons King	Edna Wearing	40-1	40.41	6
4th	Westmead Melody	Natalie Savva	25-1	40.45	3
5th	Huberts Consort	Tom Reilly	7-2	40.46	2
6th	Miss Kilkenny	Bill Bookle	4-1	00.00	5

Oaks, Harringay (Nov 4, 475m, £1,750)
Pos	Name of Greyhound	Trainer	SP	Time	Trap
1st	Switch Off	Jim Singleton	6-4f	28.69	4
2nd	Westmead Myra	John Horsfall	5-1	28.91	6
3rd	What Now	Janet Dickenson	13-8	28.91	1
4th	Coolmona Nell	Phil Rees Sr.	12-1	28.94	2
5th	Portland Dusty	Frank Melville	20-1	29.06	3
6th	House Party	Geoff De Mulder	6-1	29.16	5

== Totalisator returns ==
Extended content

The totalisator returns declared to the licensing authorities for the year 1977 are listed below.

Stadium	Turnover £
London (White City)	7,472,853
London (Walthamstow)	6,780,327
London (Wimbledon)	5,602,232
London (Harringay)	3,225,666
London (Catford)	2,988,407
London (Wembley)	2,963,407
Romford	2,872,758
Manchester (Belle Vue)	2,365,431
Slough	2,340,980
Brighton & Hove	2,289,829
Edinburgh (Powderhall)	2,175,997
Birmingham (Hall Green)	2,136,622
Crayford & Bexleyheath	1,935,220
Birmingham (Perry Barr, old)	1,815,654
Southend-on-Sea	1,586,078
Newcastle (Brough Park)	1,513,384

Stadium	Turnover £
Leeds (Elland Road)	1,475,951
Glasgow (Shawfield)	1,413,503
Sheffield (Owlerton)	1,355,543
Wolverhampton (Monmore)	1,235,879
Manchester (White City)	1,163,666
London (Hackney)	995,338
Bristol (Eastville)	933,605
Derby	840,983
Gloucester & Cheltenham	809,077
Rochester & Chatham	797,707
Yarmouth	770,844
Newcastle (Gosforth)	766,361
Willenhall	615,635
Ramsgate (Dumpton Park)	582,505
Portsmouth	577,220
Poole	465,464

Stadium	Turnover £
Reading	435,864
Cardiff (Arms Park)	431,519
Hull (Old Craven Park)	415,318
Oxford	392,313
Middlesbrough	383,173
Milton Keynes	372,997
Leicester (Blackbird Rd)	331,615
Cradley Heath	326,623
Preston	265,118
Rye House	259,851
Swindon	250,998
London (Watford)	249,247
Ipswich	245,209
Henlow (Bedfordshire)	205,000
Norton Canes	205,000
Halifax	52,000
