= 1977 Irish Greyhound Derby =

- Venue: Shelbourne Park
- Location: Dublin
- Start date: 25 July
- End date: 13 August
- Total prize money: £17,500 (winner)

The 1977 Irish Greyhound Derby took place during July and August with the final being held at Shelbourne Park in Dublin on 13 August 1977.

The winner Lindas Champion won £17,500 and was owned, trained and bred by 21-year old Michael Barrett from Ballingarry. The competition was sponsored by Carrolls.

== Final result ==
At Shelbourne, 13 August (over 525 yards):

Position	Winner	Breeding	Trap	SP	Time	Trainer
1st	Linda's Champion	Monalee Champion - Merry Linda	2	7-2	29.53	Michael Barrett
2nd	Brush Tim	Supreme Fun - Gormanstown Aye	1	100-30	29.54	Francie Murray
3rd	Greenane Decca	Monalee Champion - Fit Me In	3	7-4f	29.66	Paddy Nugent
4th	Boolas Hill	Yanka Boy - Rokeel Rebel	6	20-1	29.78	Eddie Lawlor
5th	Rokeel Light	Blessington Boy - Boola's Countess	4	5-1	30.26	Paddy Tubridy
6th	Black Bart	Sole Aim - Quarry Willow	5	9-1	30.38	Gay McKenna

=== Distances ===
Short-head, 1½, 1½, 6, 1½ (lengths)

== Competition Report ==
The Irish Derby trial stakes held around Ireland had previously failed to produce an ultimate winner of the Irish Derby but in 1977 this changed. The Kilkenny Greyhound Stadium trial stakes winner Linda's Champion had entered the stake for just £5 and gained a free entry to the competition itself by winning the Kilkenny heat.

The first round proper featured 105 entries and despite a Racing Managers strike which had closed most Irish tracks for a month. Heading the ante-post betting was the litter brothers Greenane Decca and Glen Rock both trained by Paddy Nugent, and the newly crowned Welsh Greyhound Derby champion Instant Gambler handled by Jack Murphy. English hope Gaily Noble recorded 29.17 before one of the leading contenders Glen Rock pulled up and stopped in a later heat. Other winners included Shady Monkey (29.19), Brush Tim (29.23) and Ballintee Star (29.26).

Instant Gambler impressed with a time of 28.94 in round two; Brush Tim recorded 29.02 for new trainer Francie Murray, Francie had taken over from his father Mick. Gaily Noble went well again in 29.07. Linda's Champion won in 29.25 and remarkably was competing in the Tipperary Cup at the same time as the Derby.

In the quarter-finals Instant Gambler failed to progress further and the Eugene McNamara trained Swibo defeated Gaily Noble. Linda's Champion and Greenane Decca won the remaining two heats. In the semi-final Gay McKenna gained success by claiming the first heat with 10-1 shot Black Bart from Brush Tim and Linda's Champion. The second heat resulted in Rokeel Light beating Greenane Decca and Boolas Hill.

Greenane Decca had beaten Linda's Champion in the National Produce Stakes final earlier in the year but this time the tables were turned as Linda's Champion led all the way before holding off a late challenge by Brush Tim. The photo finish went in favour of the former and Greenane Decca finished third. Linda's Champion also won the Tipperary Cup during the event.

== See also ==
- 1977 UK & Ireland Greyhound Racing Year
