= 1945 Irish Greyhound Derby =

- Venue: Harold's Cross Stadium
- Location: Dublin
- End date: 17 August

The 1945 Irish Greyhound Derby took place during August with the final being held at Harold's Cross Stadium in Dublin on 17 August.

The winner Lilac Lucks was owned by M Coolican and trained by Paddy Byrne.

== Final result ==
At Harold's Cross Stadium, 17 August (over 525 yards):

Position	Name of Greyhound	Breeding	Trap	SP	Time	Trainer
1st	Lilac Luck	Printer - Wilton Sandills	4	7-1	30.12	Paddy Byrne
2nd	Gun Music	Cherokee Border - Magic Drama	2	4-1	30.18	
3rd	Astra	Tanist - Mad Darkie	3	5-4f	30.22	Jack Horan
4th	Tanner Trail	Tanist - Miss Erris	1	4-1		Davis
5th	Highland Kid	breeding unknown	6	100-7		
6th	Prevention	breeding unknown	5	100-7		

=== Distances ===
¾, ½ (lengths)

== Competition Report ==
Mad Tanist returned for another attempt at the Irish Derby and led the ante-post lists along with his full sister Astra. Astra had defeated Mad Tanist in the recent final of the Easter Cup.

In the first round Astra equalled the track record of 29.98 secs held by Jungle Freak before Mad Tanist broke the record by recording 29.91. In the second round Astra then won in 29.88 to take the record away from her brother, who also won his heat but injured a toe in the race and would miss the rest of the competition. Lilacs Luck also remained unbeaten, winning in a time of 29.95.

The semi-finals began with Astra recovering from a bad start to catch Highland Kid in 30.24, and this was followed by wins for Lilacs Luck (30.41) and Tanner Trail (30.20).

A record attendance of 7,000 turned up at Harolds Cross to watch Lilacs Luck provide a shock and win the final. Astra had found trouble at the first bend, and early leaders Gun Music and Tanner Trail crowded each other at the third bend before Lilacs Luck took the lead. Astra made late ground but could not catch Lilacs Luck. Mad Tanist was retired to stud after the event.

== See also ==
1945 UK & Ireland Greyhound Racing Year
