= 1946 Irish Greyhound Derby =

- Venue: Shelbourne Park
- Location: Dublin
- End date: 10 August
- Total prize money: £500 (winner)

The 1946 Irish Greyhound Derby took place during July and August with the final being held at Shelbourne Park in Dublin on 10 August.

The winner Steve won £500 and was owned by Mrs R. H. Dent, bred by Pat Redmond and trained by Harry O'Neill.

== Final result ==
At Shelbourne Park, 10 August (over 525 yards):

Position	Name of Greyhound	Breeding	Trap	SP	Time	Trainer
1st	Steve	Printer - Verge of Palm	4	6-1	30.20	Harry O'Neill
2nd	Manhattan Seale	Manhattan Midnight - Drishougue	1	5-1	30.40	Stack
3rd	Bohernagraga Boy	Jockey's Glen - Adamstown Daisy	5	5-1	30.44	Tom Lynch
4th	Baytown Ivy	Manhattan Midnight - Ulster Row	3	11-10f		Paddy Barry
5th	Trustful Sweep	breeding unknown	6	10-1		
6th	Castledown Treasure	Castledown Lad - Maries Treasure	2	10-1		Paddy Barry

=== Distances ===
2½, ½ (lengths)

== Competition report ==
The Derby was won by an English connection for the first time when Steve owned by Mrs R. H. Dent (owner of Wattle Bark, winner of the 1937 English Greyhound Derby). The entry for the 1946 event was regarded as the strongest to date and some of those who were eliminated early included St Leger champion Star Point, 1945 finalists Gun Music and Tanner Trail and Oaks champion Paladins Charm.

In the first round the Jack McAllister pair Mad Midnight (Celtic Produce winner) and Miltiades (Trigo Cup winner) both won. McAlinden Cup champion Lemon Flash set the fastest time in round one of 30.06 followed by Shroid Abbey in 30.08. The second round saw the elimination of Miltiades, but kennelmate Mad Midnight won again in 30.19. Lemon Flash went fastest again, beating Steve by eight lengths in 29.96.

In the first semi-final Lemon Flash and Shroid Abbey found trouble at the third bend after the pair had led allowing Bohernagraga Boy (30.16) and Castledown Treasure to qualify for the final. In the second semi Baytown Ivy beat Steve by three lengths in 30.10 and the final heat went to Trustful Sweep from Manhattan Seale in 30.30. Mad Midnight damaged a toe after finishing fourth in the third semi-final.

In the final Steve broke well from the traps and led all the way, with Manhattan Seale finishing well to finish second.

== See also ==
- 1946 UK & Ireland Greyhound Racing Year
