= 1977 English Greyhound Derby =

- Location: White City Stadium
- Start date: 2 June
- End date: 25 June
- Total prize money: £17,500 (winner)

The 1977 Spillers Greyhound Derby took place during June with the final being held on 25 June 1977 at White City Stadium. The winner was Balliniska Band and the winning owner Raphael Bacci received £17,500. The competition was sponsored by the Spillers.

== Final result ==
At White City (over 500 metres):

Position	Name of Greyhound	Breeding	Trap	SP	Time	Trainer
1st	Balliniska Band	Lively Band - Certral	5	1-1f	29.16+	Eddie Moore (Belle Vue)
2nd	El Cavalier	Mel's Pupil - El Raco	1	5-1	29.36	Ted Griffin (Private)
3rd	Pat Seamur	Tullig Rambler - Dainty Black	4	5-1	29.72	Geoff De Mulder (Hall Green)
4th	Ballybeg Grand	The Grand Silver - Ballybeg Lady	3	16-1	29.76	Tom Chamberlain (Private)
5th	Westmead Manor	Mel's Pupil - Westmead Silver	6	8-1	29.86	Natalie Savva (Bletchley)
6th	Saucy Buck	Sole Aim - Limerick Lass	2	7-1	29.96	Barbara Tompkins (Perry Barr)

+ Equalled the track record set by Glen Rock

=== Distances ===
2½, 4½, ½, 1¼, 1¼ (lengths)
The distances between the greyhounds are in finishing order and shown in lengths. One length is equal to 0.08 of one second.

== Competition Report ==
The 1977 Derby entries included the defending champion Mutts Silver and Westmead Champ. The ante-post favourite was Glen Rock, who had set a new world record for 525 yards and held the White City track record of 29.16 sec in addition to winning the 1976 Irish Puppy Derby.

The qualifying round ended with 96 greyhounds left in the betting. Glen Rock was eliminated in the very first round in a heat won by Pat Seamur. Balliniska Band lost to Westmead Special in round one and Mutts Silver was beaten by Gaily Noble but both progressed. In the second round Greenfield Fox and Westmead Champ both went out but Ger McKenna's leading entry Red Rasper won well as did Balliniska Band. Balliniska Band then won again in the quarter-finals recording 29.24 but Red Rasper was eliminated.

The first semi-final saw Balliniska Band lead out of the traps pursued by El Cavalier, Pat Seamur did well to take third place especially as Balliniska Band equalled the time he had set in the previous round. The second semi ended the hopes of Mutts Silver after he stumbled during the race and finished last behind the victor Westmead Manor, the deposed champion was retired to stud a few days later.

In the final Balliniska Band forced Saucy Buck to check up when going past him, and then he showed good early pace to draw clear. He beat El Cavalier by 2 1/2 lengths in a track-record-equalling 29.16 sec. He was owned by Raphael Bacci and trained by Eddie Moore.

== Quarter finals ==
Heat 1
Pos	Name	SP	Time
1st	Balliniska Band	1-3f	29.24
2nd	Mercian Fireball	10-3	29.40
3rd	El Cavalier	20-1	29.66
4th	Stingray	25-1	29.92
5th	Hunday Angina	33-1	29.98
6th	Shakehands	40-1	30.14

Heat 2
Pos	Name	SP	Time
1st	Pat Seamur	6-4f	29.67
2nd	Westmead Manor	13-2	29.79
3rd	Ballybeg Grand	16-1	29.83
4th	Westmead Special	13-8	29.97
5th	Heather Rain	33-1	30.03
6th	I'll Make It	4-1	30.06

Heat 3
Pos	Name	SP	Time
1st	Mutts Silver	2-1	29.73
2nd	Reddans Walk	40-1	29.74
3rd	Elteen Queen	12-1	29.82
4th	Gaily Noble	6-1	29.98
5th	Sugarloaf Jessie	11-8f	30.02
6th	Remote Control	4-1	30.20

Heat 4
Pos	Name	SP	Time
1st	Silver Trixie	25-1	29.86
2nd	Saucy Buck	7-2	29.87
2nd	Ivors Alamo	40-1	29.87
4th	Linacre	6-4	29.93
5th	Glenesk Comet	14-1	29.97
6th	Red Rasper	5-4f	30.00

== Semi finals ==
First Semi-final (Jun 18)
Pos	Name of Greyhound	SP	Time	Trainer
1st	Westmead Manor	5-1	29.66	Savva
2nd	Ballybeg Grand	16-1	29.76	Chamberlain
3rd	Saucy Buck	5-2	29.88	Tompkins
4th	Mercian Fireball	5-2	29.90	Barnett
5th	Ivors Alamo	20-1	29.98	
6th	Mutts Silver	2-1f	30.04	Rees

Second Semi-final (Jun 18)
Pos	Name of Greyhound	SP	Time	Trainer
1st	Balliniska Band	4-7f	29.24	Moore
2nd	El Cavalier	20-1	29.30	Griffin
3rd	Pat Seamur	7-4	29.46	De Mulder
4th	Silver Trixie	12-1	29.76	Reilly
5th	Reddans Walk	12-1	30.02	Curtis
N/R	Elteen Queen			Rees

== See also ==
- 1977 UK & Ireland Greyhound Racing Year
