= 1945 English Greyhound Derby =

- Location: White City Stadium
- Start date: 16 June
- End date: 30 June
- Total prize money: £1,000 (winner)

The 1945 Greyhound Derby took place during June with the final being held on 30 June 1945 at White City Stadium. The winner Ballyhennessy Seal received a first prize of £1,000.

== Final result ==
At White City (over 525 yards):

| Position | Name of Greyhound | Breeding | Trap | SP | Time | Trainer |
|---|---|---|---|---|---|---|
| 1st | Ballyhennessy Seal | Lone Seal - Canadian Glory | 1 | 1-1f | 29.56 | Stan Martin (Wimbledon) |
| 2nd | Rhynn Castle (Reserve) | Castledown Lad - Brilliant Silvan | 4 | 20-1 | 29.96 | Dal Hawkesley (West Ham) |
| 3rd | Magic Bohemian | Jesmond Cutlet - Magic Pool | 3 | 3-1 | 30.04 | Leslie Reynolds (Wembley) |
| 4th | Tamarisk | Kilnaglory Champion - Fairlands Favourite | 2 | 8-1 | 30.20 | Jack Harvey (Wembley) |
| 5th | Duffys Arrival | Shamrock Prince - Moon Bride | 5 | 10-1 | 30.36 | George McKay (Coventry) |
| 6th | Celtic Chief | Well Squared - Second Row | 6 | 10-1 | 30.60 | William Mills (Private) |
| N/R | Kilpeacon Bride | Tiger Jazz - See the Light | | | | |

=== Distance ===
5, 1, 2, 2, 3 (lengths)
The distances between the greyhounds are in finishing order and shown in lengths. From 1927 to 1950 one length was equal to 0.06 of one second but race times are shown as 0.08 as per modern day calculations.

== Review ==
The Derby returned after a four-year absence with just three rounds and 24 greyhounds. Shannon Shore justified his price tag of 4-5f in the first heat but Ballyhennessy Seal only managed second place behind Magic Bohemian; priced at 4-5f, he missed the break and lost by 2 ½ lengths. Two 10-1 shots Celtic Chief and Rhynn Castle claimed the final heats and ante-post favourite Fish Hill was eliminated.

Ballyhennessy Seal completed a routine victory in the first semi-final running out a three length winner at odds of 4-5f, with the qualifying places going to Kilpeacon Bride and Duffys Arrival. The second semi-final was won by Tamarisk at 100-6 from Magic Bohemian and Celtic Chief.

Kilpeacon Pride came into season and was replaced by reserve Rhynn Castle for the final, watched by 58,000. Ballyhennessy Seal owned by Mrs. F.Stow and Mr E.Vivian led all the way with Rhynn Castle staying prominent throughout, Duffys Arrival and Celtic Chief impeded each other with Magic Bohemian finishing well to take third.

== See also ==
1945 UK & Ireland Greyhound Racing Year
