= Stamford Bridge Greyhounds =

Greyhound racing operation in London, England

- Interactive map of Stamford Bridge Greyhounds
- Location: London
- Coordinates: 51°28′54″N 0°11′28″W

Construction
- Opened: 31 July 1933
- Closed: 1 August 1968

Stamford Bridge Greyhounds was the greyhound racing operation held at Stamford Bridge in London, England.

== Origins ==
During 1933, Stamford Bridge Ltd, a subsidiary of parent company Greyhound Racing Association (GRA), took over the athletics track belonging to the London Athletic Club and forced them to leave because they wished to construct a greyhound track around the football pitch. The speedway team Stamford Bridge Pensioners were also forced to leave.

== Opening ==
The first night of racing was held on 31 July 1933 The track circumference as was 434 yards and it was described as a fast, average sized course with short 80-yard straights and banked bends of wide radius. Railers showed a slight advantage and the greyhounds were supplied by the famous GRA Hook Estate and Kennels in Northaw. The hare system was an outside McKee Cable hare.

== History ==
The Charlie Ashley trained Shove Halfpenny won the 1935 Pall Mall Stakes and Joe Harmon won the 1938 running of the same competition with Roeside Creamery. Events at Stamford Bridge included the Chelsea Cup, won by Creamery Border in 1936, who set a then a new world record of 28.01 seconds for 500 yards. In addition to the Chelsea Cup the tracks premier event would be the Stamford Bridge Produce Stakes, which was inaugurated in 1936.

Albert Jonas trained Return Fare II to Berkeley Cup success and the same trainer trained Roving Youth to the 1940 English Greyhound Derby final. In 1944 Stamford Bridge maintained its reputation for being an extremely fast track when Ballyhennessy Seal clocked 27.64 seconds for the 500 yards course, another world and national record.

In 1946, the Stamford Bridge totalisator turnover surpassed £5 million, to put this in perspective to football and Chelsea F.C. at the time, the British transfer record at the same time in 1946 was £14,500.

Jonas continued to train big race winners winning the Springbok with Kids Delight in 1947. During the fifties Kenneth Obee was Racing Manager before switching to sister track Harringay replaced by F A Branscombe. Assistant Racing Managers at this time included Sidney Wood and Jeff Jeffcoate. The resident trainers in 1965 consisted of Hancox, Ivor Morse, Forster, Sid Mann, Dick Clark and Jim Singleton but the GRA forced former trainer Albert Jonas and Dick Clark to leave the Northaw kennels.

With the formation of the Bookmakers Afternoon Greyhound Service (BAGS) in 1967 the National Greyhound Racing Society named Stamford Bridge as one of the tracks to host the service. This meant racing was changed to Thursday afternoons at 2.30pm, with just one evening meeting remaining on Saturday at 6.15pm.

== Closure ==
On 1 August 1968, the GRA closed Stamford Bridge to greyhound racing, quoting the fact that Stamford Bridge was forced to race on the same days as the White City.

== Competitions ==
=== Stamford Bridge Produce Stakes ===
Year	Winner	Breeding	Trainer	Time	SP
1936	Bellas Jim	Maidens Boy – Walthams Bella	Stanley Biss (West Ham)	28.56	7-2
1937	Junior Classic	Beef Cutlet – Lady Eleanor	Joe Harmon (Wimbledon)	28.00	1-3f
1946	Trev's Harlequin	Rock Callan – Wotta Gem	Fred Trevillion (Private)	28.30	7-1
1947	Trev's Idol	Trev's Despatch – G R Bexhill	Fred Trevillion (Private)	28.60	7-2
1948	Kids Shop		Paddy Fortune (Wimbledon)	28.09	100-7
1949	Denver Agent		Stanley Biss (Clapton)	28.57	20-1
1950	Hunsdon Stoat		Tom Smith (Clapton)	28.52	20–1
1951	Moreton Ann	Grand Hussar – Moreton Lily	Jack Harvey (Wembley)	28.25	10-11f
1952	Kensington Perfection	Black Invasion – Lambourn Firefly	Bill Higgins (Oxford)	28.28	11–4
1953	Prince Lionel		Tom Lightfoot (White City)	28.04	1-1f
1954	Ramsey Clipper	Slaney Record – Sally Gap	Paddy McEvoy (Private)	28.05	8-13f
1955	Marazion Millpool	Dangerous Prince – Marazion Minnie	Joe Pickering (New Cross)	28.31	100–7
1956	Highwood Spot	Westbourne – Pretty Miss Amber	Tom Smith (Clapton)	27.78	4-7f
1957	Tams Tamarisk	Imperial Dancer – Wonderful	Jimmy Jowett (Clapton)	28.08	100-8
1958	Tams Torness	Prince Chancer – Tams Trasna	Jimmy Jowett (Clapton)	27.87	2-5f
1959	Kensington Pioneer	Kensington Prince – Ann Dell	Marjorie Phipps (Oxford)	27.64	15–8
1960	Luxury Liner	Northern King – Brazen Hussy	Gunner Smith (Brighton)	27.86	4-6f
1961	Beaverwood Flash	Churchtown Ben – Stans Daughter	Frank Sanderson (Private)	27.73	
1962	Tripaway	Low Pressure – High Flight	Vivien Pateman (Private)	27.83	
1963	Hebes Ambassador	Rialto Crown – Dream Car	Joe Pickering (White City)	28.02	
1964	Marvellous City	Ballymac Sailor - Alone	Frank Conlon (Private)	27.94	3–1
1965	Caledonian Jet	Prairie Flash – Caledonian Opal	George Carrigill (Private)	27.86	

=== Other ===
- Winter Stayers Trophy
- Chelsea Cup
- May Stakes

== Track records ==
Distance (yards)	Greyhound	Time	Date	Notes
500	Creamery Border	28.01	1936+	World & National Record
500	Ballyhennessy Seal	27.64	20 May 1944	World & National Record
500	Mighty Hassan	27.24	04 July 1959	
500	Oregon Prince	27.15	27 July 1961	
700	Kampion Sailor	39.96	09 May 1946	
700	Dunmore Rocco	39.25	16 May 1959	
700	Ballymurn Prince	39.08	11 August 1962	
880	Maddalena	51.05	05 November 1959	
880	Strolling Girl	50.28	15 September 1960	
934	Magic Brooklyn	54.21	30 May 1959	
934	Hard Pressed Again	53.81	11 August 1962	
500 hurdles	Bealtaine	28.27	15 September 1938	National Record
500 hurdles	Bus Stop	28.18	30 May 1959	
500 hurdles	Crimson Wave	28.13	27 August 1964	
700 hurdles	Speedway Rebel	41.30	29 June 1939	National Record
700 hurdles	Olly's Playboy	40.46	13 June 1959	
700 hurdles	All Alone	40.42	11 June 1960	
500 Chase	Change That	28.44	13 June 1961	

== Tote Returns ==
Tote Returns
Year	£
1938	1,475,624
1941	1,819,708
1942	1,220,680
1943	980,738
1944	1,271,822
1945	3,680,966
1946	5,749,592
1947	3,787,382

Tote Returns
Year	£
1948	2,688,310
1949	2,373,263
1950	2,015,525
1951	1,856,630
1952	1,750,349
1953	1,577,000
1954	1,561,000
1962	1,320,316

Tote Returns
Year	£
1963	1,225,670
1964	1,124,298
1965	1,275,368
1966	1,249,301
1967	1,383,794
1968	703,205+

+closed during the year
