= Ballynennan Moon =

Famous racing greyhound

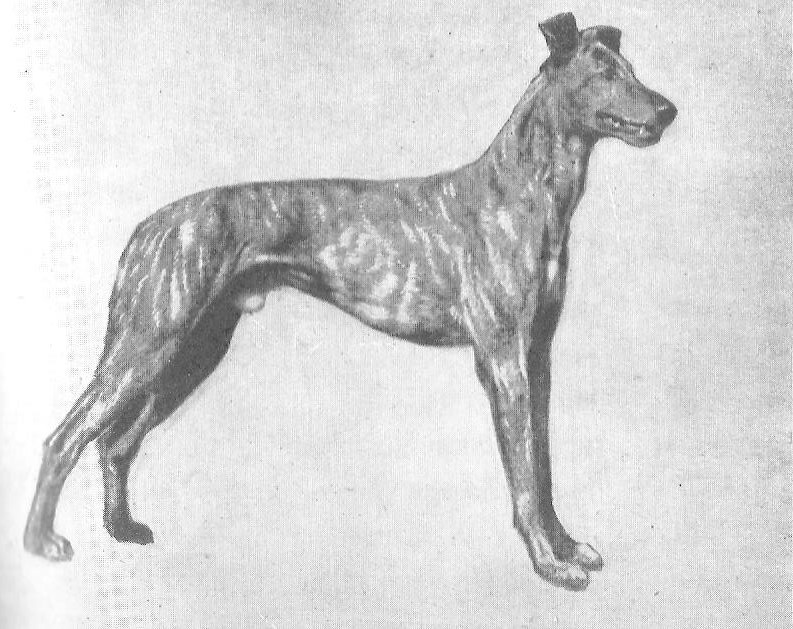
- Ballynennan Moon C.1940
- Sire: Mr Moon
- Dam: Banriogan Dann
- Sex: Dog
- Whelped: April 1939
- Color: Brindle
- Owner: Jessie Florence Cearns (née Crittenden)
- Trainer: Sidney Orton

Major wins
- Berkeley Cup; Wembley Summer Cup; Walthamstow Stakes; Eclipse; Guineas; International; Stewards Cup; Wembley Summer Cup; Wimbledon Spring Cup; Charlton Spring Cup; Metropolitan Cup; Joe Harmon Memorial Cup

Ballynennan Moon was a famous racing greyhound during World War II. He is regarded as being one of the greatest racing greyhounds and was denied the opportunity to win the English Greyhound Derby because of the postponement of the event during the war years.

== Racing career ==
=== 1939 & 1940 ===
He was born just before the start of the war in April 1939 and was owned and trained by leading Irish trainer Billy Quinn. His first significant win in Ireland was the North Kilkenny Stakes and his first twenty races resulted in eight wins.

His last race in Ireland was at Shelbourne Park where he broke the 29 second barrier. Leading owner Mrs Jessie Cearns (the wife of the Managing Director of Wimbledon, W.J. Cearns) purchased him and put him with trainer Sidney Orton.

=== 1941 ===
His first two races in 1941 ended in a major success when he won the Wembley Summer Cup. He won five more races before suffering from illness and being laid off until 1942.

=== 1942 ===
Ballynennan Moon returned after a winter rest and won the Walthamstow Stakes and Wimbledon Spring Cup. The ease in which he won his races endured him to the British wartime public and he became a welcome distraction from the war. In his next 48 races, he was to win on forty occasions and finish second seven times. After finishing first, fourteen times in succession, he seemed certain to beat Mick the Miller's 19 straight wins but, in the fifteenth race, he was beaten a neck by Laughing Lackey.

He then went on to record another eight successive wins during a five-month period and became a household name. He won the Wimbledon Spring Cup, the 1,000 Guineas at Park Royal Stadium, the Wembley Summer Cup, the Eclipse at Coventry, the Stewards Cup at Walthamstow Stadium and at the end of the year the International at Wimbledon Stadium at odds of 1/5f. Moon broke track records at Bristol, Coventry and Wandsworth.

=== 1943 ===
After 52 career wins, he was rested for two months following defeat at White City. He returned to win the Metropolitan Cup at Clapton Stadium and the Charlton Spring Cup at Charlton Stadium. Another month's rest followed in late July before it was announced that he would retire to stud in November 1943.

== Retirement ==
He was the first greyhound at stud to command a 100 guineas mating fee. He won 65 races out of 91 and won 38 trophies winning over £4,000 in prize money.

== Pedigree ==
Jamie
Mutton Cutlet
Miss Cinderella
Mr Moon
Beaded Dick
Miss Moonlight
Jazzaway
Ballynennan Moon
Melksham Tom
Other Days
Na Boc E
Banriogan Dann
Lax Law
Lilette
Leisure
