= The Dagenham Coup =

The Dagenham Coup was an incident that took place at Dagenham Greyhound Stadium on 30 June 1964.

The history of Dagenham Greyhound Stadium is dominated by one of the most infamous moments in greyhound racing history that was given the name 'The Dagenham Coup' or 'Operation Sandpaper'. On 30 June 1964 the 4.05pm race that left bookmakers owing huge sums of money and the news hit the headlines around the world.

== The plan ==
Betting off course in betting shops became legal in May 1961 following the introduction of the Betting and Gaming Act 1960. In 1964 John Turner, a 37 year old Londoner, approached a bookmaker called Leslie Carey, who controlled twenty betting shops, and the pair hatched a plan that was funded by Carey. They selected a race, in which in Turner's opinion two of the greyhounds had no chance of winning, and then they recruited 170 people in three groups, who would be paid to assist them.

== The action ==
The first group of helpers were tasked to place bets on the other four greyhounds in the remaining twelve combination bets at off course betting shops. The bets were placed shortly before the race got underway and crucially dividends (in 1964) would be paid out at the tracks odds. The second set of helpers blocked phone lines into the track to stop the off course bookmakers from phoning the track to lay off the bets.

The third group of helpers attended the Dagenham track and monopolised the 31 tote windows throughout the stadium. They placed over 11,000 bets on the two outsiders (the greyhounds that Turner believed had no chance), which in turn produced massively better odds for the other four greyhounds and the combinations that had been placed in the betting shops.

== The result ==
The result went, as Turner had expected, with the two greyhounds that Turner had discounted duly finishing down the field. The winner was a greyhound called Buckwheat, who won easily in 48.78 secs from Handsome Lass. Turner and Carey had to pay the 170 helpers and had lost money on 11,000 tote bets but this was all as planned, because the track dividends showed the combination odds of 9,217-1. Turner had one winning tote ticket worth £987 11s 9d but his helpers had placed the same combination bet 300 times in the betting shops so therefore creating 300 tickets at odds of 9,217-1 and netting Turner and Carey £600,000 (equivalent to about £11 million in 2015).

== Court case ==
Five bookmaking firms, Ladbrokes, Coral, William Hill, Jack Swift and Arthur Stanley sued Dagenham Stadium for failing to operate their tote properly and Turner for procuring odds by unlawful means. They refused to pay out and waited for the result of legal proceedings.

The court case dragged on from 1964 until 1966 before the courts and Mr Justice Paull finally settled on a ruling.

- Turner was found not guilty of unlawful conspiracy and the coup was described by Judge Paull as brilliantly successful.
- The legal costs incurred by Romford Stadium Ltd (owners of Dagenham) would be paid by the off course bookmakers.
- Turner’s one ticket worth £2,000 should be paid by Dagenham Stadium.
- The off course bookmakers should return the stake money but should consider token payments to any punters that had bet the combination outside of the area (in other words, unknowing punters that had nothing to do with the incident).

== Postscript ==
Turner endeavoured to collect the money that he felt he was owed (£600,000) because he felt that it was his racing knowledge that had allowed him to discount two greyhounds in the race but all he could do was write to the courts asking them not to renew the bookmakers licences due to welshing (oath-breaking). Within the racing industry it is considered extremely wrong if a party refuses to honour their bet (stake or winnings). The bookmakers did not pay Turner.

Romford Stadium Ltd sold their controlling interest in the Dagenham greyhound track for £185,000, and the track was closed in 1965.
