= Ballyhennessy Seal =

British racing greyhound

- Sire: Lone Seal
- Dam: Canadian Glory
- Sex: Dog
- Whelped: April 1942
- Color: Brindle
- Breeder: L C O'Connell
- Owner: Mrs F Stow / Mr E A Vivian
- Trainer: Stan Martin

Major wins
- Gold Collar; Wembley Spring Cup; International; Circuit; Wembley Summer Cup; Stewards Cup

Honours
- 1945 English Greyhound Derby champion

Ballyhennessy Seal was a famous racing greyhound during the latter part of World War II and shortly afterwards. He is regarded as being one of the leading racing greyhounds in history and won the sports ultimate prize, the English Greyhound Derby.

== Profile ==
=== 1942 ===
Ballyhennessy Seal was whelped in April 1942, by Lone Seal out of Canadian Glory. He was bred and reared in Tralee, by L C O'Connell.

=== 1943 ===
His first trial and race was in June, at Tralee Greyhound Stadium. After he won a sweepstake, he was sold to England for £50 and raced at Catford Stadium for his new owners, Mrs F Stow and Mr E A Vivian. Within two weeks of his arrival he won the 18th Rochester Stakes, his first competition and races in England.

He soon earned the nickname 'The Seal' and won his 1943 Puppy Derby heat at Wimbledon Stadium, by 14 lengths, in a time of 28.88 seconds. In the final he lost by a short head to Allardstown Playboy. Con Stevens (the Wimbledon Racing Manager) introduced a new invitation race for puppy champions and the invitation went out to Allardstown Playboy; Dark Tiger, the Trafalgar Cup winner; Erlegh Hero, winner of the British Produce Stakes, Model Dasher, the Midland Puppy Derby winner, and Fawn Cherry, winner of the Irish Puppy Derby. Model Dasher was subsequently withdrawn injured, which allowed Ballyhennessy Seal a place in the race. 'The Seal' was fast out the traps and led all the way to win by one and a half lengths in 28.99 seconds.

=== 1944 ===
In the early part of 1944 he was moved from his training base at Catford, to be trained by Stan Martin at Wimbledon. He set a new track record at Stamford Bridge in the May Stakes, when recording a world record time of 27.64 seconds for the 500 yards course. Following this was an appearance in the Circuit at Walthamstow Stadium and another two new track records were set, in the semi-finals (28.62) and final (28.59). In addition to the Circuit he won the Wembley Summer Cup, the Stewards Cup and the International and reached the final of the Eclipse.

=== 1945 ===
In 1945 'The Seal' won the Wembley Spring Cup and then sealed his most prominent competition victory to date, when winning the Gold Collar at Catford in impressive style winning his heat and semi final by eight lengths. Ballyhennessy Seal was then aimed at the sports ultimate prize, the 1945 English Greyhound Derby and the competition started at White City on 16 June.

The Seal went to the traps in heat two priced 4-5f but he missed the break and could not catch Magic Bohemian losing by 2½ lengths. Despite the defeat, Ballyhennessy Seal completed a routine victory in the first semi final winning by three lengths at odds of 4-5f. In the final Ballyhennessy Seal led all the way with Rhynn Castle staying prominent throughout, Duffys Arrival and Celtic Chief impeded each other with Magic Bohemian finishing well to take third.

After a short break Ballyhennessy Seal returned to action in the Laurels and progressed through the competition with ease but was then reported to be suffering from rheumatism in his hind legs. He was subsequently withdrawn because he did not respond to treatment and was then retired to stud. In 1946 he demanded £100 for a mating fee at the Burhill Kennels.

== Pedigree ==
Macoma
Silver Seal
Yatton Tiny
Lone Seal
Mutton Cutlet
Lucky Plum
Last Plum
Ballyhennessy Seal
Deemster
Junta
Sweet Cherry
Canadian Glory
Eagle's Beak
Bold Eagle
Brave Lil
