= Ballybunion Greyhound Stadium =

Former greyhound racing stadium in County Kerry, Ireland

- Interactive map of Ballybunion Greyhound Stadium
- Location: Sandhill Rd, Killehenny, Ballybunion, County Kerry, Ireland
- Coordinates: 52°29′59.2″N 9°40′20.0″W

Construction
- Opened: 1966
- Closed: 1973

Ballybunion Greyhound Stadium was a greyhound racing stadium off Sandhill Road, in Killehenny, Ballybunion, County Kerry.

The west coast seaside town of Ballybunion in County Kerry had previously hosted greyhound racing from 1933-1939.

== History ==
In 1958 the president of the Irish Coursing Club, Matt O'Sullivan applied for a licence as the proprietor of a new Ballybunion track but the Bord na gCon headed by Seamus Flanagan refused the licence due to objections lodged by the nearby Tralee track. At the time any track within the same area could object to another hoping to become licensed. The licence was refused again in 1964.

In January 1965, O'Sullivan (the owner of the Central Hotel in the town) finally won the right to host greyhound racing after taking the Bord na gCon to court. The court ruled that he should be granted a licence.

The re-opening was on 18 May 1966 when the Ballybunion Greyhound Racing Club Ltd ran the venue until 1973. It hosted a valuable Smirnoff Gold Collar race from 1966-1970 worth a record £1,340 in 1967. The event was sponsored by Gilbeys of Ireland and saw two new track records set, first by Coolowen Pride in 29.66 followed by Sandy Lee in 29.52. Racing was held on Monday and Wednesday evenings at 8.30pm.

The winners of the Gold Collar were - 1966 Dogstown Star, 1967 Seneca, 1968 Pools Punter and 1969 West Park Una.

== Location ==
The site of the track was where the Green Valley caravan park is situated today.

== Track records ==
Yards	Greyhound	Time	Date	Notes
300	Lucky Blunder	16.80	1970	
300	Tranquillity Sea	16.75	24.05.1971	
525	Coolowen Pride	29.66	1967	Gold Collar
525	Sandy Lee	29.52	1967	Gold Collar
525	Gortkelly Hope	29.41	1970	
525	Tranquillity Sea	29.40	21.07.1971	
550	Pools Punter	30.99	1970	
550	Barony Pride	30.88	22.07.1970	
725	Tomophas	41.65	24.07.1968	
525 H	Charlestown	30.54	23.08.1967	

== Ballybunion Gold Collar ==
Year	Winner
1966	Dogstown Star
1967	Seneca
1968	Pools Punter
1969	West Park Una
