= Albion Greyhound Stadium =

Greyhound racing stadium in Glasgow, Scotland

Albion Greyhound Stadium, Glasgow
- Interactive map of Albion Greyhound Stadium, Glasgow
- Location: Glasgow
- Coordinates: 55°51′07.1″N 4°18′49.4″W

Construction
- Opened: 1928
- Closed: 1960

Tenant
- Greyhound racing

The Albion Greyhound Stadium was a greyhound racing stadium in Glasgow.

== Origins ==
Albion in Glasgow opened on 21 April 1928 on the Broomloan Road and was described as good size track with a circumference of 457 yards. The first hare installed was an outside running 'Metro-Vickers Mono-rail' and the distances were 300, 553, and 725 yards. Albion Stadium was built in close proximity to Ibrox Stadium which was on the north side and White City Stadium, Glasgow which opened the same year and was on the south-west side.

== History ==
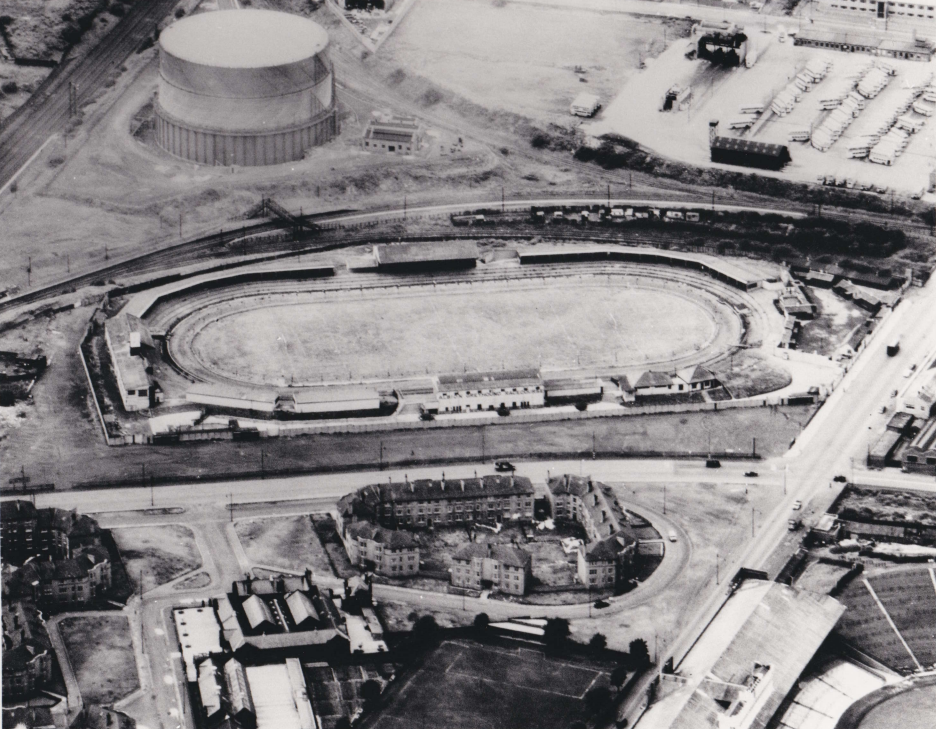
Albion Greyhound Stadium c.1950

The principal event was the Ibrox & Albion Stakes and facilities included the Ibrox licensed Sports Club with membership subscription. Owned by the Albion Glasgow Racing Ltd the track was affiliated to the National Greyhound Racing Society and became a very popular venue during the 1930s.

After the war the Glasgow City assessor increased the valuations of the five greyhound stadiums in Glasgow. This was opposed by the tracks because of the resulting tax charges. The assessor valued the stadium at £12,000 but the track management disagreed with their own valuation of £1,250.

The stadium closed on 23 June 1960. Part of the site, directly south of Edmiston Drive, was used to build the Broomloan Court tower block flats in 1965; these were themselves demolished in the 2010s, with Scottish Water later occupying the site as part of a major drainage infrastructure project. The remaining area of the stadium was grassed over and utilised as a training ground by Rangers F.C. from the latter 1960s and beyond, before being converted into a car park for spectators. In the 2020s, plans were approved for residential apartments to be built on a portion of the car park, with the design featuring two 'U-shaped' buildings facing one another to recall the greyhound stadium's oval (also incorporating rounded windows and red brick finish as seen on the listed main stand at nearby Ibrox Stadium).

== Track records ==
Distance yards	Greyhound	Date
300	Culzean Major	1946
525	Culzean Major	1946
