= Dagenham Greyhound Stadium =

Former greyhound racing venue in London

- Location: Dagenham, London
- Coordinates: 51°31′40″N 0°08′22″E
- Opened: 1930
- Closed: 1965

Dagenham Greyhound Stadium was a greyhound racing and short lived motorcycle speedway stadium in Dagenham, London.

== Origins ==
=== Original track ===
In 1930 a greyhound track was built on former farm land situated north of the London, Tilbury and Southend railway and directly west of Choats Manor Way, off the Ripple Road. The track was small and basic with sharp turns favouring railers (greyhounds nearest to the inside rail) and the racing was independent (unaffiliated to a governing body) opened.

In 1931 the track used an alternative to the new automatic totalisator by using water displacement instead of electricity. The following year in 1932, speedway arrived at the track with various meetings arranged and ran in conjunction with the greyhound meetings. One charity greyhound meeting was organised in 1934, with proceeds going to the race meeting for King George Hospital, London.

On 21 June 1936, the first speedway meeting of the season was held and one month later on 12 July a Dagenham team rode a match against Leicester Super. When speedway was held the venue it was known as Ripple Road. Speedway and greyhounds continued throughout 1937 and 1938 and the Dagenham speedway team, nicknamed the Daggers, competed in the Sunday Dirt-Track League with, Smallford, Eastbourne and Romford, the latter also riding at Ripple Road. Crashes killed two riders in quick succession at the track, the first was Harry Rogers on 17 May 1938 and less than three months later, David Jackson was killed on 11 August 1938.

Later in 1938, Romford Stadium Ltd (the owners of the recently built Romford Greyhound Stadium) purchased the site with plans to improve and rebuild the greyhound track into a stadium. The company was headed by Archer Frederick Leggett.

== Re-Opening ==
The construction took nine months to complete and Lord Denham of the National Greyhound Racing Club, who had opened Oxford Stadium four days earlier, arrived on the 4 April 1939 to officially open the new stadium, under NGRC rules. All races were worth £10 to the winners. Arthur Warwick was given the option to promote the speedway at the track.

== History ==
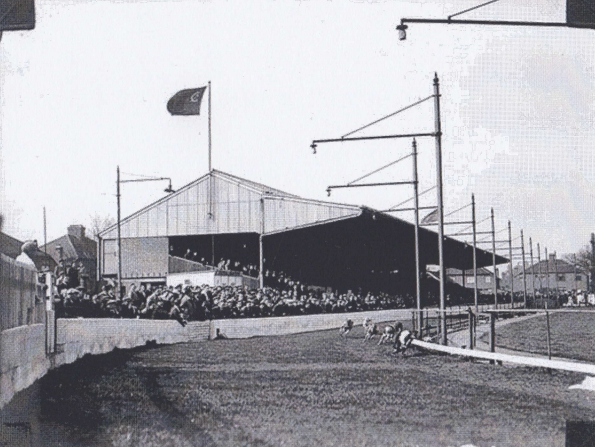
Greyhounds rounding the first bend at Dagenham Greyhound Stadium c.1950

Despite opening close to the start of Second World War the stadium flourished causing the authorities to question issues such as the use of public transport for non essential travel and the morality of racing during the war. In 1942 the track was subject to an identity swoop by military police looking for service absentees and civilians with defective identity cards.

In December 1941 two teenagers carrying a ladder hit an overhanging electric cable killing 16 year old Harold Brindley and badly burning his friend 17 year old John Love and in March 1944 West Ham Stadium switched their racing to Dagenham for a short time whilst the West Ham track was closed.

The circuit had a circumference of 380 yards and was therefore described as a little track with sharp turns favouring railers, the distances raced were 460 and 650 yards and the greyhounds raced behind a 'Trackless McWhirter' hare system. Facilities included the Junior Club and Senior Club, the latter housed the hare control room, press box and judges room and to its left was a tea bar. Additionally both clubs offered hot and cold buffets. Behind the 650 yards traps was a weights board display and between the first and second bends was the totalisator. In addition to the rack kennels and weighing room on the home straight there were residential kennels nearby at Heaton Grange, Straight Road in Romford.

== The Dagenham Coup ==
The stadium will be forever remembered for one of the most infamous moments in greyhound racing history on 30 June 1964 that was given the name The Dagenham Coup.

== Closure ==
As a result of the Dagenham Coup the stadium failed to recover and following the court cases Romford Stadium Ltd sold their controlling interest for £185,000 to Reynolds packaging in 1965. Romford Stadium Ltd stated that government restrictions on fixtures forced both tracks (Dagenham and Romford) to race on the same day and that in turn impacted attendances. The site today is an industrial area off Choats Manor Way north of the railway line.

== Track records ==
| Distance yards | Greyhound | Time (sec) | Date | Notes/ref |
|---|---|---|---|---|
| 460 | Westpark Quail | 25.91 | 1965 | |
| 650 | Haverbrack Rona | 38.01 | c.1950 | |
