= White City Stadium, Glasgow =

Scottish greyhound racing venue

White City Stadium (Glasgow)
- Location: Paisley Road West, Ibrox / Craigton, Glasgow
- Coordinates: 55°50′56″N 4°19′03″W
- Opened: 7 April 1928
- Closed: April 1972

White City Stadium was a greyhound racing and speedway track in Glasgow, Scotland.

== Greyhound racing ==
=== Origins ===
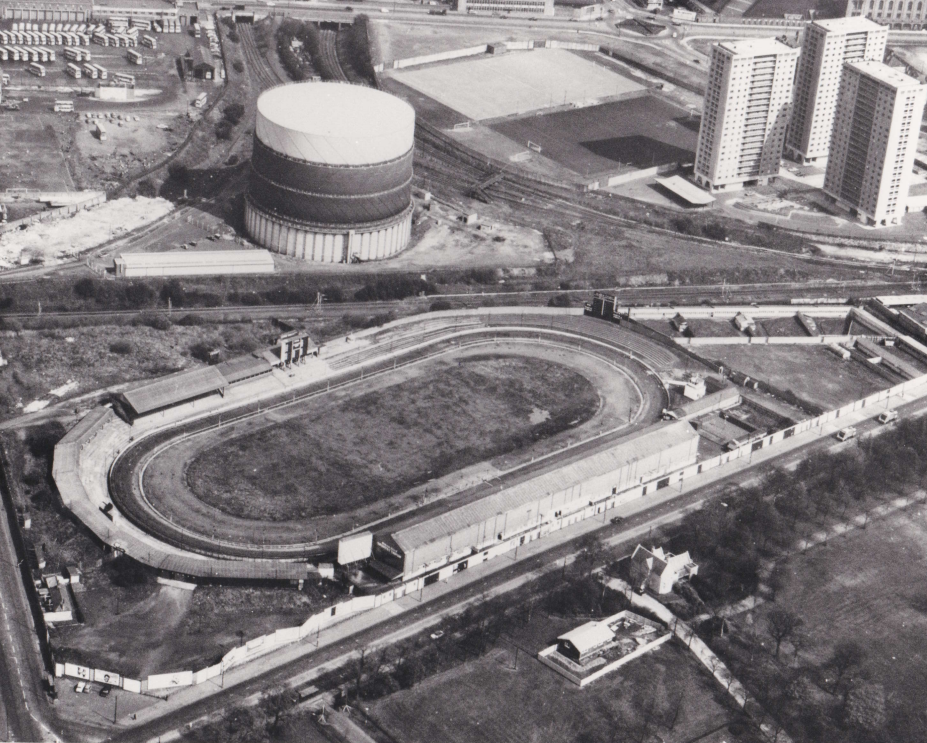
White City Greyhound Stadium c.1960

The stadium was built on Paisley Road West in Glasgow close to Ibrox Stadium, which was situated to the north-east and even closer to the Albion Greyhound Stadium, which opened the same year and across the road also on the north-east side. When the stadium opened it was known as the White City Sports stadium and in addition to greyhound racing hosted Speedway and show jumping. Bellahouston Park lay immediately to the south.

=== Opening ===
The first meeting was held during 7 April 1928, the same night that Lythalls Lane Stadium and Clapton Stadium opened to greyhound racing. The track was affiliated to the National Greyhound Racing Society along with fellow Glasgow tracks Albion and Carntyne Stadium. The grandstand stood on the south side adjacent to Paisley Road with terracing all around the track. The circumference was a large 518 yards which allowed a back straight distance of 320 yards and three sets of traps on the home straight offered distances of 530, 550 & 590 yards respectively.

=== History ===
Track trainers won the Scottish Greyhound Derby on two occasions, first with Sister Olive in 1931 and one year later with Laverock. In 1946 a tax assessment by the Glasgow City assessor increased the valuations of the five greyhound stadiums in Glasgow and the stadium owned by White City Glasgow Ltd was given a £6,700 valuation compared to the £4,000 that was quoted by the track.

White City was one of the few greyhound tracks that used two separate hare systems with an 'Outside M.S Cable' as well as a 'Sumner' hare. All of the greyhounds were company owned and kept within the stadium grounds.

== Speedway ==
The stadium became well known as mainly an international speedway venue but suffered from the 45% entertainment tax introduced by the government after the war. It continued to run speedway and was the original home for the Glasgow Tigers speedway team.

== Closure ==
In 1967 plans were revealed regarding the proposed M8 motorway that would be constructed. Five years later in April 1972 the track closed and the site would later be demolished to make way for the motorway. Some years later, Helen Street police station was built on the part of the site not occupied by the road.

== Track records ==
Distance yards	Greyhound	Time	Date	Notes
320	Come To Pass	17.58	27.07.1948	
320	Starka	17.35	16.06.1964	
530	Ballylander's Man	29.86	27.07.1949	
530	Silent System	29.31	07.04.1965	
530	Snells Kick	29.31	1970	=track record
550	Derrylea Master	30.83	03.08.1948	
550	Lowfield King	30.06	29.06.1963	
590	French Toy	33.28	1948	
590	Belle of Killarney	33.28	1948	=track record
590	Lowfield King	32.30	06.07.1963	
