= Melton Mowbray Greyhound Stadium =

Greyhound racing venue in Melton Mowbray, UK

- Interactive map of Melton Mowbray Greyhound Stadium
- Location: Saxby Road, Melton Mowbray, Leicestershire
- Coordinates: 52°45′54″N 0°52′16″W

Construction
- Opened: 1946
- Closed: 1969

Melton Mowbray Greyhound Stadium was a greyhound racing and Motorcycle speedway stadium located on the north side of Saxby Road, Melton Mowbray, Leicestershire.

== Origins ==
Greyhound racing in Melton Mowbray took place on a straight in Egerton Park just after the end of World War II, which led to the construction of a purpose built facility the following year, on the east side of Melton Mowbray. The stadium was built next door (on the east side) to the All England Sports Ground, it was owned by Jack Bingham and Charles Sampey.

== Greyhound Racing ==
The stadium opened to greyhound racing on 11 June 1946 and the racing was independent (not affiliated to the sports governing body the National Greyhound Racing Club). Racing took place every Thursday and Saturday and the hare system used was an inside electric sledge hare.

== Speedway ==
The stadium hosted speedway which was held during 1949 and 1950.

== Closure ==
The final meeting was held during July 1969, after it was shut down by owners Jack Bingham and Charles Sampey, following their retirement. The site is now an industrial park and in particular warehouses used by Asfordby Storage & Haulage Ltd.
