= Jimmy Jowett =

British greyhound racing professional trainer

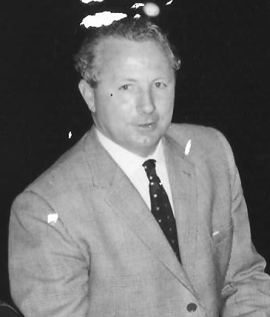

Personal information
- Occupation: Greyhound trainer

Sport
- Sport: Greyhound racing

Achievements and titles
- National finals: Classic/Feature wins: St Leger (1964); Oaks (1958); Scurry Gold Cup (1952, 1953, 1959, 1960); Grand National (1958, 1960); TV Trophy (1965)

Jimmy Jowett was an English greyhound trainer. He was the British champion trainer.

== Biography ==
Jowett's first success was the 1939 Metropolitan Cup. Before the War he was a private trainer before taking up a position at Belle Vue Stadium in 1946. He soon returned to private training in 1947 and was based at Grappenhall in Warrington.

In 1952 he joined Clapton Stadium Ltd and trained at Warrington Greyhound Stadium, where he quickly established himself as the leading trainer. After this spell at Warrington, he joined Clapton in 1952 and was based at the Hook Estate and Kennels, Northaw. He won the Scurry Gold Cup four times, twice with Gorey Airways.

Jowett retired one year before Clapton closed in 1974.

== Awards ==
Jowett was the winner of the Greyhound Trainer of the Year in 1961.
