= Leicester Stadium =

Defunct sports stadium in Leicester, England

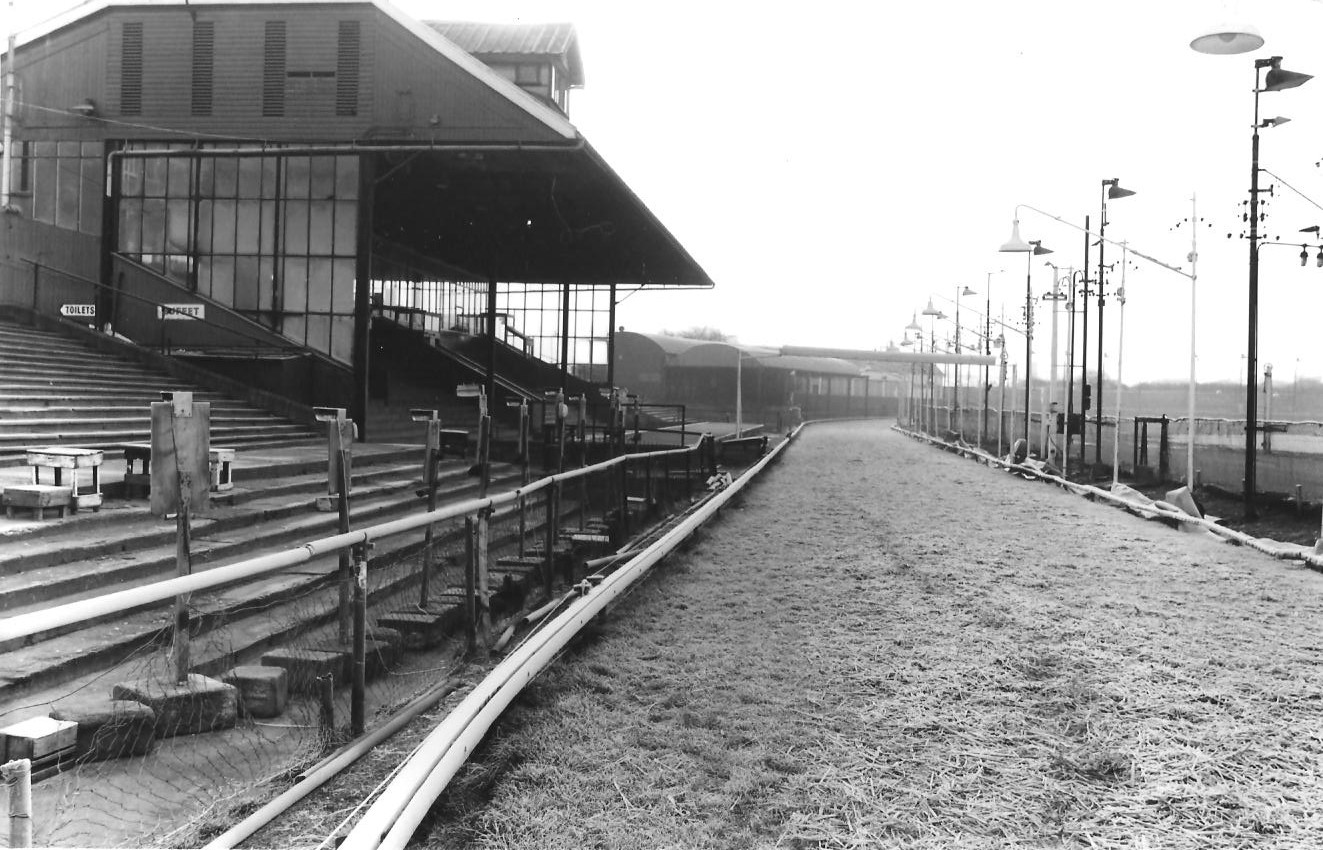
- Location: Leicester, England
- Coordinates: 52°39′13″N 1°08′44″W
- Opened: 1923
- Closed: 1984
- Major events: Greyhound racing Speedway; BriSCA Formula 1 Stock Cars

Oval
- Length: 0.347 km (0.216 miles)

Leicester Stadium also known as the Blackbird Road Stadium, was a sports stadium on Parker Drive in Leicester. The stadium was initially used for greyhound racing with motorcycle speedway starting there five years later. It was also a venue for BriSCA Formula 1 Stock Cars.

== Greyhound racing ==
=== Origins & Opening ===
In 1923, the site chosen for Leicester Stadium was an area of land in north Leicester near the Blackbird Road. The exact location was on the north side of where the Parkers Drive met Somerset Avenue. Greyhound racing became extremely popular in the county of Leicestershire with tracks at Aylestone Road in south Leicester and the nearby town of Coalville already hosting tracks that had opened in 1927.

Leicester Stadium opened on Saturday 26 May 1928 with six heats of the Quorn Open sweepstakes and a hurdle race completing the seven race card. Eleven thousand spectators (including the Mayor Alderman J.Thomas) attended and watched Barley Leader become the first ever winner over 525 yards at odds of 4-7f. Trainers King, Hulme, Glover and Barton all picked up winners on that first night at the venue that was known at the time as 'The Stadium'. Speedway soon followed costing £30,000 to construct the dirt track inside the greyhound circuit and the first speedway meeting on 6 September 1928, with sidecar racing also staged that year.

=== History ===
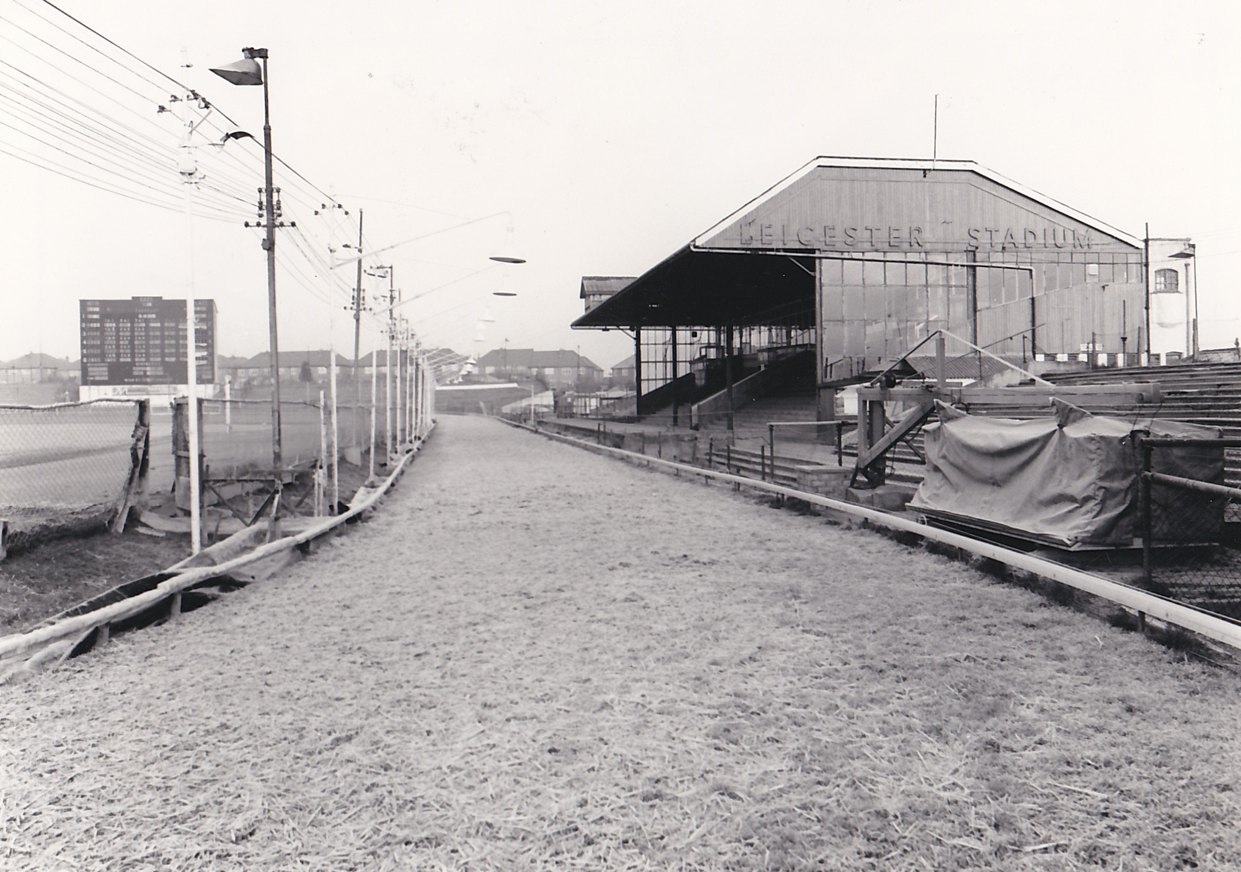
Leicester Greyhound Stadium c.1950

In 1930, Jack Buck (one of the original 1926 Belle Vue trainers) switched from Carntyne to train at Leicester.

Despite competition from further tracks opening in Leicestershire (Syston 1931, Hinckley 1936 and Melton Mowbray 1946) business remained strong with totalisator turnover in 1946 an impressive £1,605,830. The stadium was bought by Alan and Hilda Sanderson, owners of the two Coventry stadiums (Lythalls Lane) and (Brandon) in 1950 which resulted in a new company name of Midland Sports given to all of the tracks. Charles Ochiltree who had some shares in the company was made General Manager and racing was held on Thursday and Saturday evenings at 7.00pm. The hare was an 'Inside Sumner' with a track circumference of 467 yards. Facilities included a small self-service restaurant, three buffet bars and three licensed bars.

In 1959 Harold Richards replaced O’Leary as Racing Manager before Dan McCormick and former trainer John Rowe were brought in as General and Racing Manager's respectively. Resident trainers in 1965 consisted of Peverell, McNally, Wales and Lea but it was the appointment of leading trainer Geoff DeMulder joined the track as a trainer that brought success to the track in 1967 after he won the Derby Consolation with Daybreak Again. A significant event called the Midland Grand Prix was inaugurated at the track and in 1973 George McKay who had been a Racing Manager died. Mick Wheble formerly of Harringay and Catford was made chief Racing Manager at Leicester and Coventry before Ochiltree received offers to sell the track.

=== Track records ===
Distance	Greyhound	Time	Date	Notes
275m	Miss Caesar	16.04	1979	
310y	The Glen Abbey		3 March 1961	
310y	Cold Keg	16.98	1970	
310y	Cash For Harry	16.97	31 May 1971	
400y	Prince Fallock	22.09	16 July 1964	
400y	Black Walk	21.93	17 September 1966	
425m	Jet Control	28.35	1978	
460y	Landings Hero	25.55	13 August 1970	
485m	Rikasso Mick		1983	
525y	Behattan Marquis		1949	
525y	Troytown Playmate	29.13	19 April 1961	
525y	Black Walk	28.85	29 September 1966	
650m	Owners Guide	38.98	1979	
700y	Breachs Blizzard	39.48	8 September 1966	
708m	Ka Boom	43.13	1977	
750y	Bright And Bouncing	43.50	2 October 1941	

== Stock car racing ==
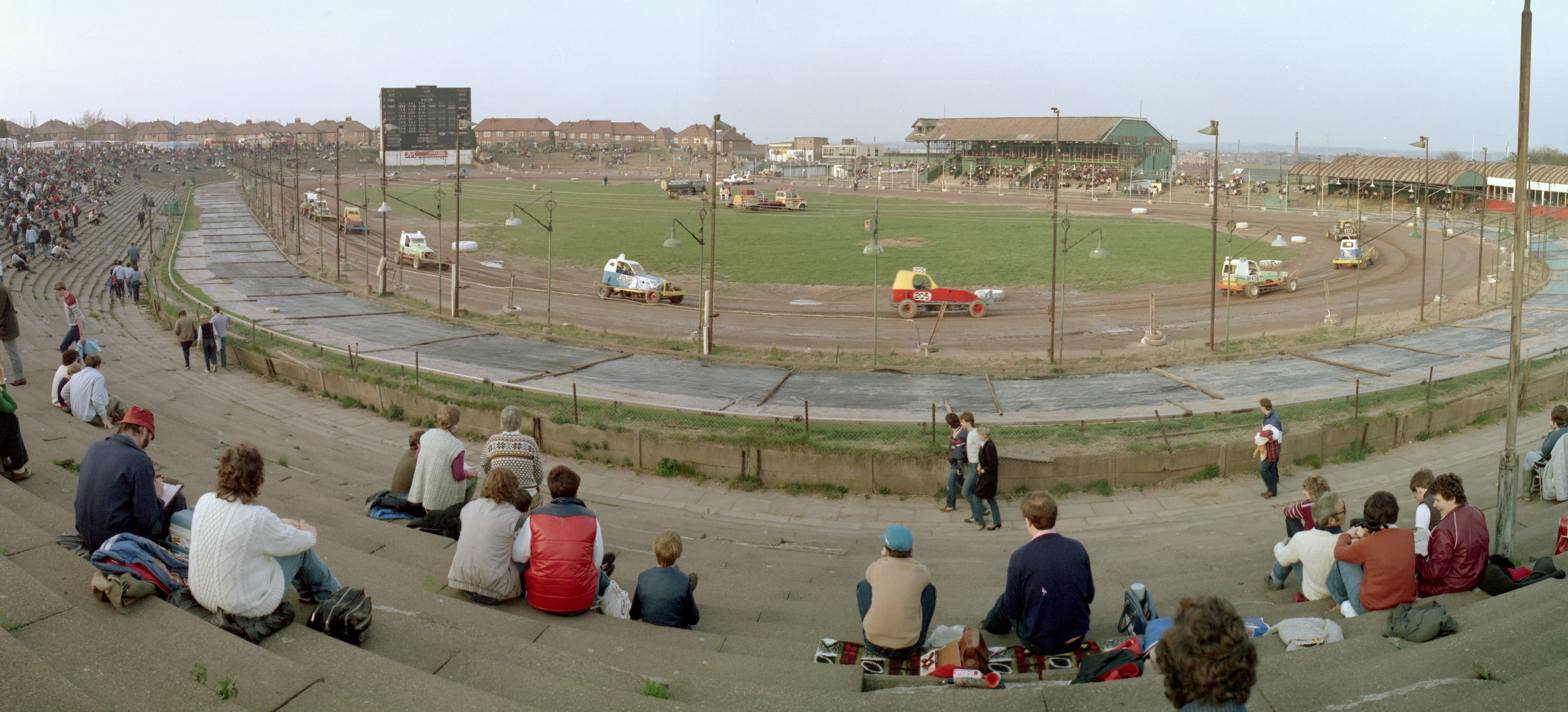
A Stock Car Race in progress at Leicester Stadium in Summer 1984 (note that this is an amalgamation of two photographs stitched together).

Stock car racing was first held in 1954 through to 1956, then held in 1962 and 1963. Racing finally returned in 1974 until the stadium closed in 1984.

== Speedway ==
The stadium lent its name to the speedway team, known as 'Leicester Stadium', which competed in the English Dirt Track League in 1929 and the Southern League from 1930. The speedway track was relaid before the 1932 season, but speedway only operated intermittently in the years that followed. Speedway returned to the stadium in 1949 with the Leicester Hunters who continued there until 1962, after which the speedway promotion of the day moved to Long Eaton due to low attendances. A few meetings were staged in 1963, including the 'Pride of the Midlands' individual competition won by Ove Fundin, but regular speedway did not return until 1968 when the Long Eaton operation transferred to Leicester, beginning the first era of the Leicester Lions.

=== See also ===
- Leicester Stadium (speedway team)
- Leicester Hunters

== Closure ==
In November 1983 it was announced that Midland Sports Stadiums Ltd had accepted a conditional offer for the Blackbird Road Stadium. Despite a failed bid in 1978 a second bid from Barratts Homes was accepted. The last meeting took place on 15 September 1984 with a greyhound called Spinning Top being the last winner.
