= Hook Estate and Kennels =

Greyhound kennels facility in Potteers Bar, Hertfordshire, England

- Interactive map of Hook Estate and Kennels
- Location: Coopers Lane Road; Northaw, Potters Bar, Hertfordshire
- Coordinates: 51°41′48″N 0°08′59″W

Construction
- Opened: c.1931
- Closed: 1980s

The Hook Estate and Kennels was a greyhound racing kennels facility located just off Coopers Lane Road in Northaw, Potters Bar, Hertfordshire.

It was the leading United Kingdom greyhound racing kennels for over fifty years and became a famed facility within the industry as the base for the London stadiums of White City Stadium, Stamford Bridge, Harringay Stadium and much later Clapton Stadium and West Ham Stadium.

== Origins ==
The Hook House an (Asymmetrical Tuscan-style villa) was built in 1839. It was bought by Mr. George Roddick in 1906. The kennels were built on 150 acres of park and grassland (c.1931), purchased by the Greyhound Racing Association (GRA), soon after the first oval track racing arrived in the United Kingdom.

== Construction ==
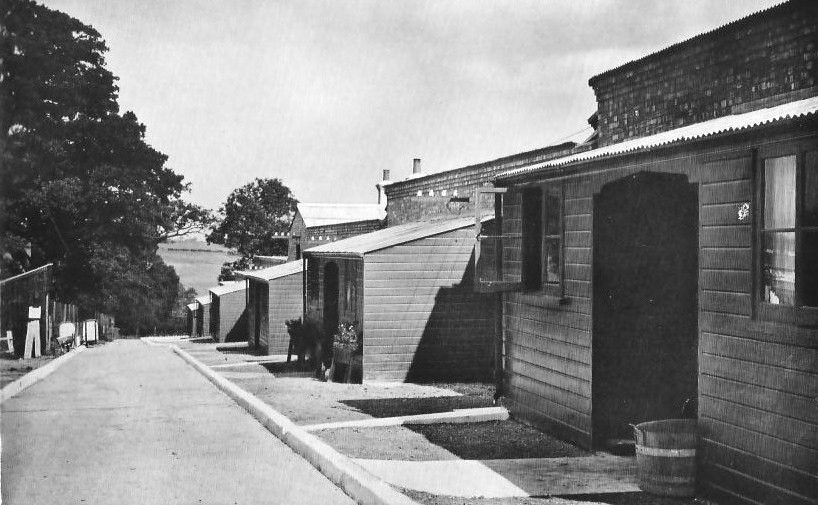
The Greyhound Racing Association's Hook Kennels in Northaw.

The kennels were located on what was formerly Hook Farm, south of Hook Wood. The mansion 'Hook House' or 'The Hook' served as a base for some of the senior staff including the kennel manager and veterinary surgeon and the Hook Cottages and newly built Hook villas were divided among the trainers and their families attached to the GRA's racetracks. The kennels opened with 150 employees and there was a separate kennel block for each of the original three tracks.

== History ==
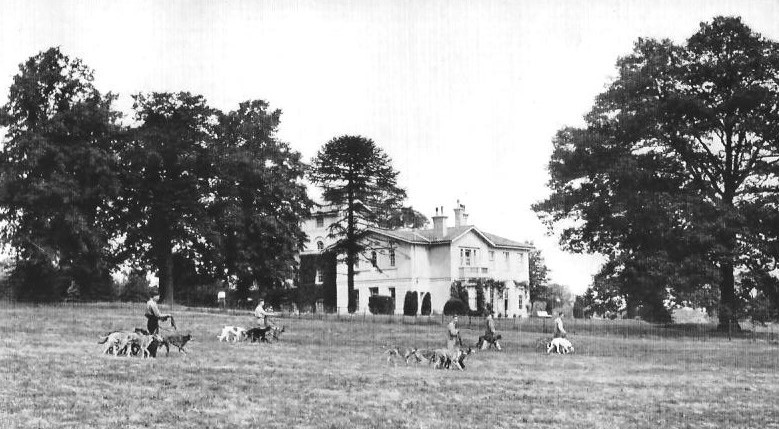
The Hook House and Estate during the 1930s, greyhounds exercised in grounds

The estate at this time was solely for racing hounds and puppies over nine months old and could house over 600 greyhounds. The puppies under nine months were reared under the supervision of William Skerratt on farms in and around Blythe Bridge, before graduating to Northaw, it is reputed that there were sixty farmers employed to help rear them. The kennel staff at the Hook Kennels lived in track dormitories depending on their race track attachment and had the use of leisure facilities on site. There was an animal medical facility, isolation kennels, laundry and even a sun tanning room for the greyhounds.

The first person in charge of the facility was Colonel A. D. Cameron, the Racing Director of GRA at the time.

The usual daily routine for the racing greyhounds was -

- 7.30am (Reveille), greyhounds let into paddock and two 100 yard gallops.
- 9.30am (Breakfast), breakfast followed by half hour rest.
- 10.00am (Walking), long road walk to harden feet and nails. Other training duties depending on specific greyhound.
- 2.30pm (Return), back to kennels, grooming, cleaning, examination, short grass walk or play in paddock.
- 4.30pm (Dinner), large meal and then short paddock time before being put away for night.

Trainers based at the kennel at one time or another included Leslie Reynolds, Joe Harmon, Jack Harvey, Peter Hawkesley, Jimmy Jowett, Randy Singleton, Joe Pickering, Les Parry, Tom Lightfoot, Jim Singleton, Jimmy Rimmer, Wilf France, Eric Hiscock, Dick Clark, Sidney Mann, Bert Heyes, Charlie Ashley, Albert Jonas, Harry Buck, Eddie Wright, Ted Parker, Charlie Smoothy and Jack Cooper.

To assist in housing the kennel staff, a residential block was built in 1957, this was in addition to the existing 10 houses in Hook Lane. A swimming pool was also constructed to help condition the greyhounds and the Hook House became a Grade II listed building on 6 February 1952.

In 1968 the GRA decided to move all of the greyhounds out of the Clapton kennels, at Claverhambury Farm and the West Ham kennels and put them at the training establishment at the Hook kennels which would now house all trainers from Harringay, White City, Clapton and West Ham (Stamford Bridge had closed the same year).

== Closure ==
West Ham closed in 1972, Clapton in 1974 and White City closed in 1984, leaving only Harringay being served by the kennels. The site was sold for £1 million and the kennels were closed down in 1986 and then were subject to planning for retirement homes.

== Today ==
The Hook House was acquired in April 1980 by the Oshwal Association of the United Kingdom and is used as the Oshwal Centre. Some of the former estate is now private housing known as Northaw Park.
