= Lythalls Lane Stadium =

Former Motorcycle and Greyhound racing stadium in Coventry

- Interactive map of Lythalls Lane Stadium
- Location: Coventry
- Coordinates: 52°26′36.241″N 1°30′9.041″W

Construction
- Opened: 1928
- Closed: 1964

Tenants
- Greyhound racing & speedway

Lythalls Lane Stadium was a greyhound racing and Motorcycle speedway stadium in Coventry. It is sometimes referred to as Foleshill Stadium or Coventry Stadium but should not be confused with Brandon Stadium.

== Origins ==
In 1928 the Coventry Greyhounds Ltd constructed a greyhound and speedway stadium in the Holbrooks area of Coventry off Lythalls Lane, Foleshill. Opening night was 7 April 1928; the track was a reasonable size and able to accommodate over 5,000 spectators. There was a large grandstand on the home straight and tote facilities right in front of the winning line. The first speedway in Coventry arrived during the inaugural year of UK speedway on 21 July 1928. The racing was organised by Midlands Speedways (a Manchester company) with a series of open and challenge events.

== History ==
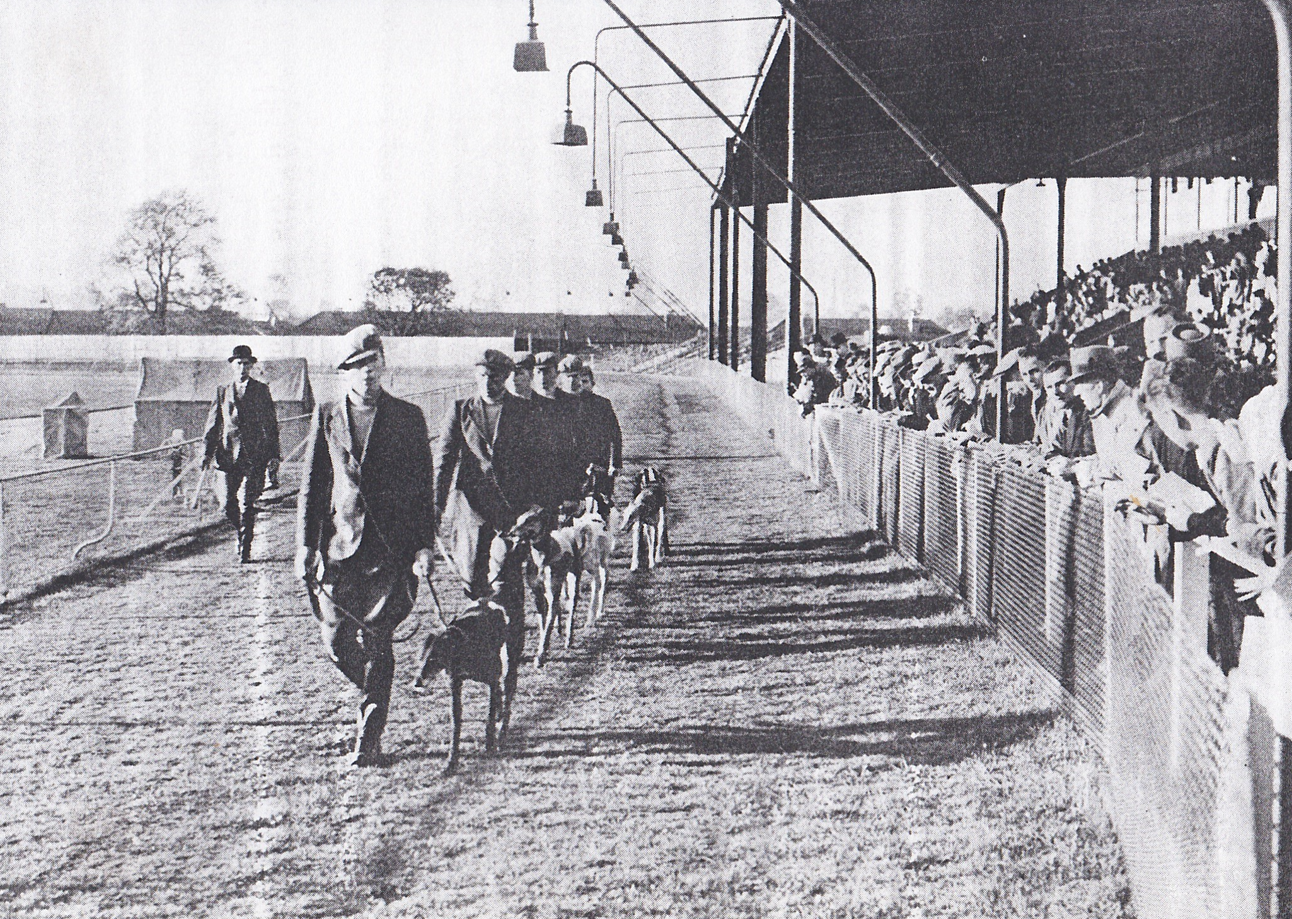
Coventry Greyhound Stadium Lythalls Lane c.1940

The track got off to an inauspicious start when the General and Racing Manager Lieutenant-Colonel Geoffrey Nigel Fitzjohn committed suicide in the stadium offices in 1929. The 47-year old took a dose of prussic acid, a highly poisonous substance. Then in early 1933 the main stand caught fire and was destroyed.

In 1938 the Eclipse Stakes was inaugurated at the track over 500 yards. Lythalls Lane was located in a mainly rural area during World War II and the only damage during the Coventry Blitz in 1940 and 1941 was a clubhouse that burned. A year later Ballynennan Moon won the Eclipse, the event had returned after a two-year break.

After the war the Sanderson's (Alan and wife Hilda) acquired the freehold of the stadium, Alan Sanderson owned the luxury Selsdon Park Hotel built in the 1920s and was reputed to have bottomless pockets. In addition to the Lythalls Lane purchase was the nearby Brandon Stadium that hosted the Coventry Bees speedway team. Sanderson was also a big speedway fan.

The racing was very profitable as indicated by a tote turnover of £1,529,244 in 1947 and the track could attract the best greyhounds of the era. In the Invitation Stakes run at Coventry on 9 August 1945 Bah's Choice beat Quare Times by five lengths in a new track record with a time of 29.45sec. In 1946 Clare Orton (son of the great Sidney Orton) was recruited by the track.

The company changed name in 1950 following the purchase of Leicester Stadium in Blackbird Road from Leicester Stadium Ltd. The new guise would be Midland Sports.

== Achievements ==
The Sanderson's employed George McKay as their greyhound trainer considerable success. Duffys Arrival reached the final of the 1945 English Greyhound Derby losing out to Ballyhennessy Seal. Another of McKay's charges Robeen Printer won the St Leger in 1945 and then went for the Oaks but had to settle for runners up spot to Prancing Kitty. Robeen Printer had arrived in England with a fine reputation following a victory in the Irish Laurels. The fawn was bought for record 1,650 guineas for a bitch by the Sanderson's. McKay would become Racing Manager at the track some years later.

Success in the fifties came in the form of Drumman Rambler trained by Olly Chetland, the Coventry greyhound finished runner up in the 1952 English Greyhound Derby final. Duke of Alva (Dicky Myles) claimed the St Leger title in 1957.

== Closure ==
Midland Sports owned three Midlands tracks and with competition for business this ultimately let to the demise of Lythalls Lane. An agreement was reached for the redevelopment of the site and planning permission was passed. The last meeting was held on 25 September 1964.

Today there is a road called Stadium Close, the only reminder that a stadium existed beneath the housing on Compton Road.

== Competitions ==
- The Eclipse

== Track records ==
Yards	Greyhound	Time (sec)	Date	Notes/ref
310	Robeen Printer	17.28	10 June 1946	
525	Neidins Bunty	30.57	1938	
525	Collar	30.50	12 November 1938	
525	Ballynennan Moon	29.57	22 August 1942	Eclipse heats
525	Parish Model	29.43	3 May 1947	
525	Faithful Charlie	29.19	29 August 1961	Eclipse heats
525	Jim's Tour	29.16	29 August 1961	Eclipse heats
525	SS Leader	29.12	29 August 1961	Eclipse heats
700	Shaggy Lass	40.87	4 February 1947	
750	Model Dasher	43.65	14 April 1945	
525H	Wolverton Grenadier	30.86	21 March 1946	
