= 1927 UK & Ireland Greyhound Racing Year =

Greyhound racing year

The 1927 UK & Ireland Greyhound Racing Year was the second year of greyhound racing in the United Kingdom and the inaugural year of greyhound racing in Ireland.

== Summary ==
=== Greyhound Racing Association ===
The GRA acquired the near-derelict White City Stadium, (originally The Great Stadium), that had been built in 1908 for the Summer Olympics. The White City track was grassed over and Major Percy Brown was installed as Racing Manager. On 20 June, a greyhound called Charlie Cranston won the first ever race there and with club house accommodation for over 1,000 people, and a 500-yard track circumference with wide sweeping turns and fast times the venue was an immediate hit with the public. Early visitors included Edward VIII and Prince George, later King George VI. The GRA also moved its headquarters to White City Stadium from Belle Vue Stadium at the same time.

Harringay Stadium was the third greyhound racing stadium to be bought by the GRA. It was constructed by Messers T.G. Simpson of Victoria Street, London, at a cost of £35,000. The 23-acre site was formerly the Williamson's Pottery Works from the late 18th century through to the early 1900s. On completion the stadium had a capacity of 50,000. When it opened on the 13 September it was originally called Harringay Park.

The GRA's finances were helped with the use of a sophisticated automatic totalisator betting system. By the end of the year GRA had ownership or shares in no less than 19 tracks that were already operating or due to open in the near future. Two of the planned tracks failed to go ahead. Despite the trustees allowing the Crystal Palace site to be used for greyhound racing it never got off the ground. A Protestant church petition of 43,434 signatures helped the National Anti-Gambling League prosecute the trustees and the racing proposals failed. In addition the £60,000 proposal for the Isle of Man race track, at Onchan Head Bay, with a bathing pool and changing facilities failed. A bill was put before Tynwald (Isle of Man parliament) to prohibit betting and gaming except on the existing horse racing activities and it was passed. The 17 tracks remaining was a remarkable achievement due to the fact that GRA had only come into existence as a company the previous year. Other companies began to rival the GRA and there were well publicised disputes between the GRA and these companies. A National board of control of canine and greyhound racing held a meeting in Manchester to form a control board for greyhound racing (a short lived organisation for tracks outside of the GRA).

=== Ireland and Scotland ===
Ireland had been a hot bed of coursing for many years and was also subjected to the new version of track racing. A greyhound called Mick the Miller had been born in June 1926 and the brindle dog was named after Michael Greene, who was the odd-job man at the vicarage and Millbrook house where the dog was born and raised. One of his duties was looking after the dog and the other eleven in the litter when they were puppies. Bred by a parish priest called Father Martin Brophy, Mick the Miller was sent coursing and was actually beaten in his first course against a greyhound called Hidden Jew.

A quartet of Irish enthusiasts Hugh McAlinden, Joe Shaw, Jim Clarke and Paddy O'Donoghue introduced track racing to Ireland at Celtic Park in Belfast when the first Irish track was built and opened on 18 April. This was followed by Shelbourne Park in Dublin one month later on the 14 May. Shelbourne employed four track trainers in their kennels, Mick Horan, Paddy Quigley, Billy Donoghue and Ben Scally. Scotland opened Powderhall Stadium (North Edinburgh) located in Beaverhall Road on 3 August. This was a track with easy bends and long straights and over 10,000 attended the first meeting.

=== Competitions ===
The GRA introduced the first major races to be held on an annual basis, including 1927 English Greyhound Derby held at White City. They also created the Champion Hurdle (later to be named the Grand National) for hurdlers and the Oaks for bitches (both at White City), these races were named after the big horse races. Belle Vue introduced the Northern Flat as their first major event. The meetings at the tracks would be managed by the Racing Manager and stewards who would normally be selected from prominent military backgrounds. In addition the GRA purchased the Hook estate at Northaw, 13 miles from the centre of London. It was the base for GRA trainers to train greyhounds for White City and Harringay and later other London tracks. The 140 acres of park and grassland would become famous within the industry. The estate at this time was solely for racing hounds and puppies over nine months old and could house 600 dogs. The pups under nine months were reared under the supervision of William Skerratt on farms in and around Blythe Bridge near Stoke-on-Trent before graduating to Northaw.

=== Wembley ===
Wembley Greyhounds opened on the 10 December and although the venue will forever be known for football, the irony is that it was greyhound racing that had kept the stadium afloat in its early days. The stadium on the verge of bankruptcy and closure was bought by Arthur Elvin who brought in greyhound racing which saved the stadium from being demolished. Elvin had secured Wembley Stadium by putting a 10% deposit down for a total of £122,500. He had originally won the contract to demolish the site for owner James White who died shortly after leaving the stadium in the hands of the receivers; Elvin set up a new company and he became the Managing Director. The Director of Racing was Captain Arthur Brice, a well known judge at the Waterloo Cup. On the 30 December the National Greyhound Racing Society (NGRS) was formed to represent the commercial interests of the racecourse promoters.

=== News ===
Bookmaker Joe Coral took a pitch at Harringay and then White City; the Coral Empire was born and would go via Clapton and Walthamstow greyhounds before branching into betting offices.

In the Oaks heats were held at various tracks within the GRA with the winner representing the track in the Grand Final at White City. The home representative Peach Blossom II started as hot favourite after taking the White City qualifying final two days previous in a smart 29.58. However it was the Harringay hound Three of Spades that took the honours defeating the Scottish challenger by two lengths.

Although Bonzo is listed as winner of the first Grand National in 1927, the title of the event he won was the Champion Hurdle Race, the culmination of a competition organised by the GRA on the same lines as the inaugural Derby. A North vs. South affair, restricted to greyhounds racing on tracks owned by the company. Northern zone dogs, from Belle Vue, Liverpool and Powderhall, took part in a qualifying competition called the Westmorland Cup, while their Southern counterparts at Hall Green, Harringay and White City were sorted out in the Chesham Hurdle. Jumps races on GRA tracks were then confined to four runners, so only the first two qualified for the final.

== Tracks opened ==
Date	Stadium/Track	Location	Operator	Ref
18 April	Celtic Park	Belfast	National Racing Greyhound Company	
23 April	Breck Park Stadium	Liverpool	Liverpool Greyhound Club Ltd (LGC)	
14 May	Shelbourne Park	Dublin	National Greyhound Racing Company (Ireland)	
21 May	Kings Heath Stadium	Birmingham	British Greyhound Sports Club	
23 May	Darnall Stadium	Sheffield	Associated Greyhound Racecourse Ltd (AGR Ltd)	
20 June	White City Stadium	London	GRA	
2 July	The Boulevard	Hull	Associated Greyhound Racecourse Ltd (AGR Ltd)	
16 July	Elland Road Greyhound Stadium	Leeds	Leeds Greyhound Association Ltd (LGA)	
23 July	Knowle Stadium	Bristol	Bristol Greyhound Club	
27 July	The Kursaal	Southend-on-Sea	Electric Hare Company	
30 July	St Annes	Blackpool	British Greyhounds Sports Club (Blackpool) Ltd	
1 August	Henlow Stadium	Bedfordshire	Independent (unlicensed)	
3 August	Powderhall Stadium	Edinburgh	GRA	
17 August	Stanley Greyhound Stadium	Liverpool	GRA	
24 August	Hall Green Stadium	Birmingham	GRA	
1 September	Shebbertown Racecourse	Nr Bideford	Independent (unlicensed)	
3 September	Towneley Stadium	Burnley	Associated Greyhound Racecourse Ltd (AGR Ltd)	
13 September	Harringay Stadium	London	GRA	
17 September	Carntyne Stadium	Glasgow	The Scottish Greyhound Racing Company Ltd	
24 September	Aylestone Road	Leicester	GRA	
4 October	Fullerton Park	Leeds	GRA	
8 October	Greenfield Stadium	Bradford	GRA	
10 October	Mount Vernon Sports Stadium	Glasgow	Independent (unlicensed)	
15 October	Coalville Greyhound Stadium	Coalville	Independent (unlicensed)	
31 October	Greenford Park Trotting Track	London	Independent (unlicensed)	
10 December	Raikes Park Greyhound Stadium	Bolton	Independent (unlicensed)	
10 December	Wembley Stadium	London	Wembley Stadium Ltd	
unknown	Brewery Field	Bridgend	Welsh Greyhound Racing Association	

== Competitions inaugurated ==
- English Greyhound Derby at White City Stadium - see 1927 English Greyhound Derby
- Champion Hurdle/Grand National at White City Stadium
- Oaks at White City Stadium
- Northern Flat at Belle Vue Stadium

== Roll of honour ==
Major Winners
Award	Name of Winner
1927 English Greyhound Derby	Entry Badge

=== Principal UK races ===
Westmorland Cup (Northern Championship) First 2 to Grand National final Belle Vue (3 Oct, 500y hurdles)
Pos	Name of Greyhound	Trainer	SP	Time	Notes
1st	Bonzo	Jack Buck (Belle Vue)			q
2nd	Fanny's Chum	Charles Habin (Stanley, Liverpool)			q
3rd	Walk The Hall	(Stanley, Liverpool)			
4th	Larkins Rebel	Powderhall			

Chesham Hurdle (Southern Championship) First 2 to Grand National final White City (1 Oct, 500y hurdles) First 2 to final
Pos	Name of Greyhound	Trainer	SP	Time	Notes
1st	Jasserand	Godfrey Hyde-Clarke (White City)	5/2	32.01	q
2nd	Billows	Jack Kennedy (Harringay)	8/1	32.05	q
3rd	Ejector Breech	Bill Fear (White City)	7/4f	32.69	
4th	Cheerful Billy	Arthur Davenport (Hall Green)	2/1		

Champion Hurdle/Grand National Final White City (10 Oct, 500y hurdles)
Pos	Name of Greyhound	Trainer	SP	Time	Notes
1st	Bonzo	Jack Buck (Belle Vue)	13/8f	31.12	1
2nd	Jasserand	Godfrey Hyde-Clarke (White City)	5/2	31.16	2
3rd	Fanny's Chum	Charles Habin (Stanley, Liverpool)	2/1		4
4th	Billows	Jack Kennedy (Harringay)	8/1		3

Oaks Final White City (12 Oct, 500y)
Pos	Name of Greyhound	Trainer	SP	Time	Notes
1st	Three of Spades	Sid Jennings (Harringay)	5/1	29.96	
2nd	Western Lass	C Hughes (Powderhall)	5/1	30.12	
3rd	Peach Blossom II	W Smith (White City)	6/4f		
u	Annual Payment	Bannister (Belle Vue)	4/1		
u	Hope Again	Hall Green	5/1		
u	Wily Jess	Stanley, Liverpool	20/1		

Note:

- Distances were recorded as 0.06 sec for one length (until 1950) and in Ireland 0.07 sec for one length (until 1990).
