= 1947 English Greyhound Derby =

- Location: White City Stadium
- Start date: 14 June
- End date: 28 June
- Total prize money: £1,400 (winner)

The 1947 Greyhound Derby took place during June with the final being held on 28 June 1947 at White City Stadium. The winner Trev's Perfection received a first prize of £1,400.

== Final result ==
At White City (over 525 yards):

Position	Name of Greyhound	Breeding	Trap	SP	Time	Trainer
1st	Trev's Perfection	Trev's Despatch - Friar Tuck	2	4-1	28.95	Fred Trevillion (Private)
2nd	Mondays News	Orlucks Best - Monday Next	5	9-4f	29.11	Fred Farey (Private)
3rd	Slaney Record	Rare Record - Honey Gale	6	100-7	29.23	Jack Toseland (Perry Barr)
4th	Trev's Jackie	Mad Tanist - Lady Lavender	4	10-1	29.31	Fred Trevillion (Private)
5th	Lacken Invader	Munster Hills - Murex	3	4-1	29.47	L Hague (White City - Manchester)
6th	Patsys Record	Patsy Bogoak - Sunmount View	1	7-2	29.67	Stan Biss (Clapton)

=== Distances ===
2, 1½, 1, 2, 2½ (lengths)
The distances between the greyhounds are in finishing order and shown in lengths. From 1927-1950 one length was equal to 0.06 of one second but race times are shown as 0.08 as per modern day calculations.

== Review ==
36 greyhounds lined up for the 1947 Derby, with three semi-finals planned after the first round. The reason for this was a decision by the Greyhound Racing Association (GRA) to allow the Racing Manager Major Percy Brown to select all of the runners for the event. Mondays News (the defending champion) were joined by Priceless Border, a recent arrival from Ireland who had clocked a record time of 29.54 at Celtic Park. The ante post favourites are Dante II; the black dog was a finalist in 1946 and had gone from strength to strength winning the Pall Mall, Edinburgh Cup and Northern Flat and Tonycus who are both quoted at 5-1. Trev's Perfection (formerly Motts Regret) and Trev's Jackie were the main entries for Fred Trevillion, his initial Derby dog, a £900 purchase from Ireland called Trev's Councillor (formerly Councillors Rock) had returned to Ireland after being disqualified for fighting.

During the first round Trev's Perfection won heat two in 29.30, quickly followed by Dante II in a time just six spots slower. Dante II had encountered trouble in his race but showed great determination to win in 29.99. Priceless Border was an easy eight length victor in 29.18 and Mondays News progressed winning in 29.36. All of the four favourites had sealed a semi-final place.

Before the semi-finals, Priceless Border had to be withdrawn from the competition because he was off colour. Trev's Perfection claimed the first heat with Slaney Record finishing in second place, Dante II was eliminated after finding trouble again. Lacken Invader came from behind to win the second heat, catching defending champion Mondays News and finally Clapton greyhound Patsys Record won the third and final heat, with Trev's Jackie claiming the last qualifying place.

At 10.15pm, on Saturday 28 June, before a crowd of 55,000 Mondays News was hoping to emulate Mick the Miller by winning a second Derby. Mondays News broke in front but moved wide at the first bend allowing Trev's Perfection inside him. The brindle dog resisted the efforts of the favourite and ran out a two length winner, in a new Derby final best time. It was the first time 29 seconds had been broken in the Derby final and it was also the first time the Derby had been won from trap two. In a bizarre twist, when Trev's Perfection was called Motts Regret he had been trained by Fred Farey, the current handler of Mondays News. Trev's Perfection went on to complete the Triple Crown of Scottish, English and Welsh Derby wins.

== See also ==
- 1947 UK & Ireland Greyhound Racing Year
