= 1960 English Greyhound Derby =

Greyhound racing competition

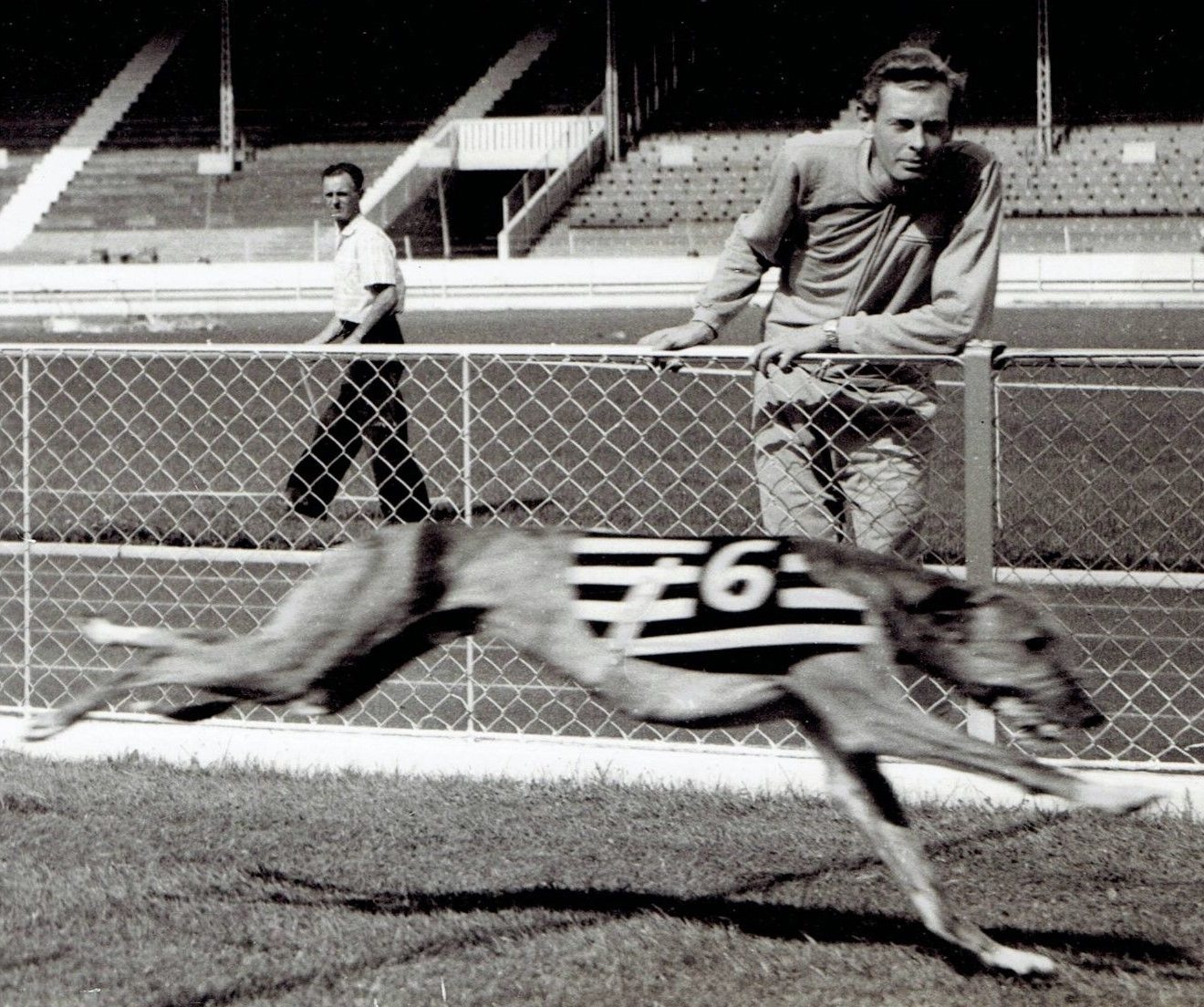
- Runner-up Clonalvy Romance during a trial in 1959.
- Location: White City Stadium
- Start date: 11 June
- End date: 25 June
- Total prize money: £2,000 (winner)

The 1960 Greyhound Derby took place during June with the final being held on 25 June 1960 at White City Stadium. The winner Duleek Dandy received £2,000 for the husband and wife team of Bill Dash (trainer) and Vicki Dash (owner).

== Final result ==
At White City (over 525 yards):

Position	Name of Greyhound	Breeding	Trap	SP	Time (Sec)	Trainer
1st	Duleek Dandy	Flash Jack – Flower of Duleek	4	25/1	29.15	Bill Dash (Private)
2nd	Clonalvy Romance	Solar Prince – Asmena	5	11/2	29.33	Fred Taylor (White City – London)
3rd	Mile Bush Pride	The Grand Champion – Witching Dancer	1	4/5f	29.41	Jack Harvey (Wembley)
4th	Caramilk	Solar Prince – Imperial Peg	6	100/6	29.83	Tom 'Paddy' Reilly (Walthamstow)
5th	Wheatfield Swan	Fourth of July – Kal's Kitty	2	50/1	29.93	Leslie Reynolds (Wembley)
6th	Clonalvy Pride	Solar Prince – Asmena	3	2/1	29.99	Jack Harvey (Wembley)

=== Distances ===
2 1/4, 1, 1 1/4, 5 1/4, ¾ (lengths)
The distances between the greyhounds are in finishing order and shown in lengths. From 1950 one length was equal to 0.08 of one second.

== Competition Report ==
The defending champion Mile Bush Pride topped the ante-post betting and started as the most likely greyhound to emulate Mick the Miller's achievement of two Derby wins.

The first round saw many favourites eliminated; 1958 champion Pigalle Wonder was the first to go out followed by Armed Escort, Wood Lane Stakes winner Long Story, Kilmoney Daffodil, Welcome Home and Varra Black Nose. Clonalvy Pride came to prominence by leading all the way from Dunstown Paddy with Mile Bush Pride qualifying in a lowly third place.

The second round restored normality as Mile Bush Pride recorded 28.63, the fastest time of the year at White City. Clonalvy Pride also progressed after overcoming serious trouble.

The semi-finals provided a piece of history because they were both won by litter brothers. The first was won by Clonalvy Pride taking advantage of a terrible draw and start for Mile Bush Pride who in turn overtook sprinter Gorey Airways to claim second place, Wheatfield Swan ran on for the remaining qualifying place. The second semi-final went to 8-1 shot Clonalvy Romance owned by Olympic athlete Brian Hewson.

The draw for the final led to Mile Bush Pride gaining his favourite trap one draw but as the traps rose Clonalvy Romance broke well pursued by outsider Duleek Dandy. Mile Bush Pride remained in contention until the third bend when Duleek Dandy headed Clonalvy Romance for the first time. Mile Bush Pride tight on the rails was making a move but was forced to check behind Clonalvy Romance effectively ending the dream of a second Derby win. Duleek Dandy deservedly went on to win by 2 1/4 lengths and become the biggest price winner of the Derby at odds of 25-1.

Duleek Dandy owned by Vicki Dash and trained by husband Bill had won the Trafalgar Cup in 1959 but following injuries had been forced to run a trial stake by Major Percy Brown to gain entry to the Derby. Luckily a short head win had resulted in Duleek Dandy claiming one of only twelve places available to greyhounds not selected by Brown. Incidentally it was the first time that only 36 of the 48 runners had been selected by Brown, the remaining twelve runners had to compete in trial stakes and included Clonalvy Pride and Duleek Dandy as mentioned earlier.

== See also ==
- 1960 UK & Ireland Greyhound Racing Year
