= Cardiff Greyhounds =

Former greyhound racing venue in Wales

- Location: Cardiff Arms Park, Westgate Street, Cardiff
- Coordinates: 51°28′47″N 3°11′1″W
- Opened: 1927
- Closed: 1977

Cardiff Greyhounds was the greyhound racing operation held at Cardiff Arms Park in Cardiff from 1927 to 1977. It is not to be confused with the greyhound racing held from 1928 to 1937 at the White City Stadium, Cardiff.

== Origins and opening ==
To assist with maintenance of the site, a greyhound track was built around the rugby pitch in 1927. The first meeting was held on 7 April 1928.

== Pre war history ==
The Arms Park (Cardiff) Greyhound Racing Company Limited signed a 50-year lease in 1937, with Cardiff Athletic Club (the owners of the Arms Park) and having no rights to break the agreement or to review the rental until 50 years expired.

The circumference of the track was a large 452 yards with long straights of 160 yards. An 'Outside Sumner' hare was used and race distances consisted of 300, 500, 525 and 700 yards. The kennel facilities were at nearby Cefn Mably in St Mellons and the leading event was the Glamorgan Cup held over 500 yards. 1991

In 1932 a notable greyhound called Beef Cutlet made his debut at the track. Beef Cutlet won the Glamorgan Cup and set a new track record, in 28.41 seconds. His Waterhall kennels based trainer John Hegarty would later become a Racing Manager at the track.

In 1937 the Greyhound Racing Association closed the nearby White City stadium, leaving the Arms Park as the sole Cardiff venue. John Jolliffe was Racing Manager here in 1937 arriving from Aberdeen before he secured the Racing Manager's position at Wembley.

== Post war history ==
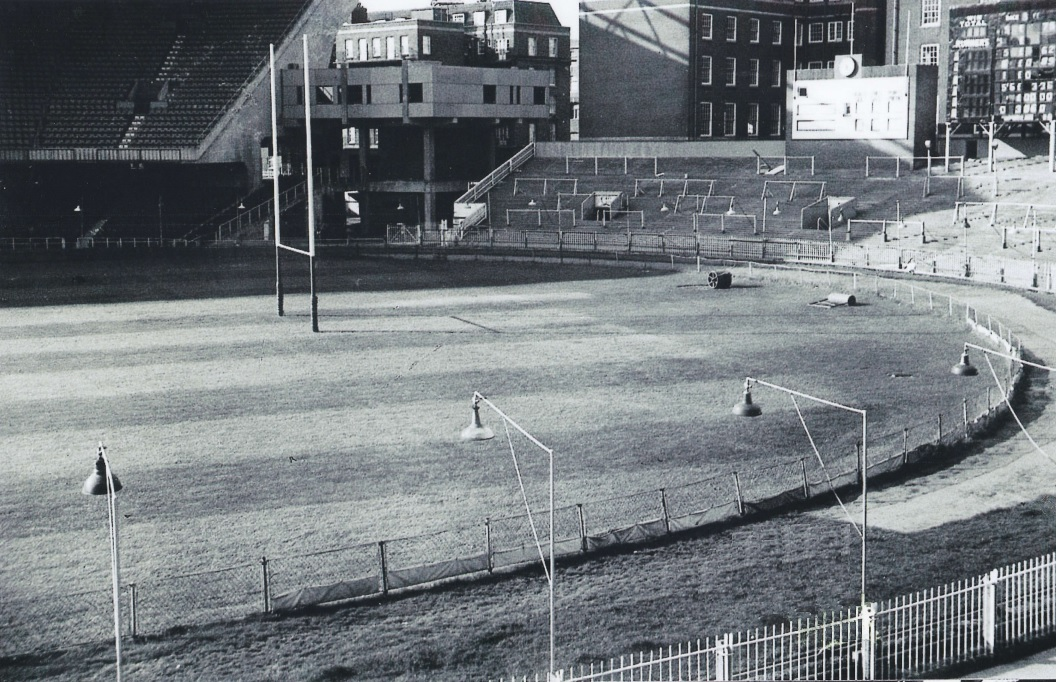
Cardiff (Arms Park) greyhound track c.1960

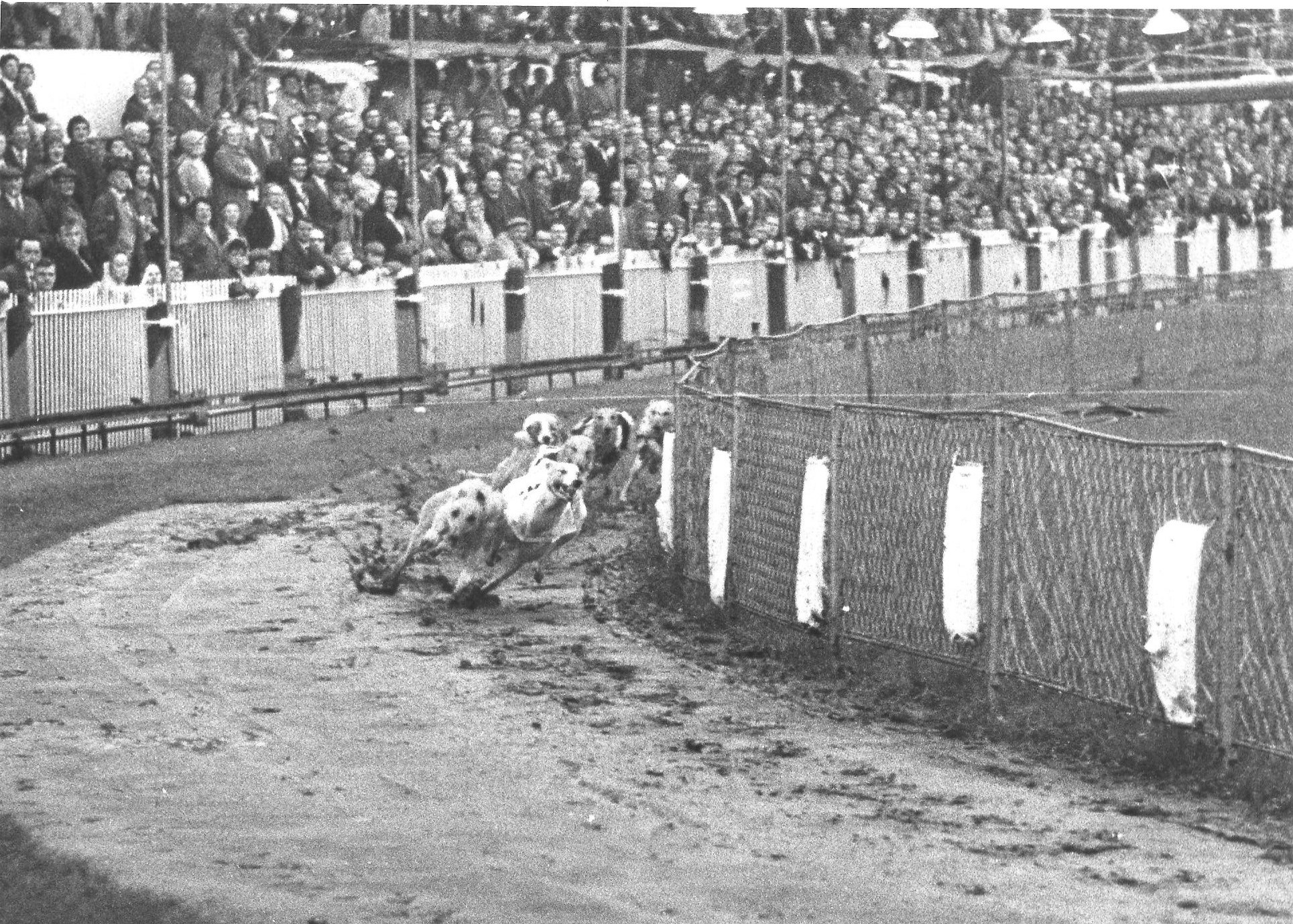
1972 Welsh Greyhound Derby final

After the war the Welsh Greyhound Derby was transferred to the Arms Park from White City. This was one of the three competitions that formed the triple crown along with the English Greyhound Derby and Scottish Greyhound Derby. The track continued to host the race annually. Racing was held on Monday and Saturday evenings.

The greyhound company introduced floodlights in 1958 which upset the rugby fans. The Welsh Derby was won by the likes of Trev's Perfection (who completed the Triple Crown in 1947), Local Interprize, Ballycurreen Garrett, Ballylanigan Tanist, Endless Gossip, Rushton Mac and Mile Bush Pride in a golden era. The event was so popular that despite the stadium being taken over for the 1958 British Empire and Commonwealth Games the track was re-laid in time for the Welsh Derby to take place in October. In 1971 the Welsh Greyhound Derby was given 'classic' status.

Problems for greyhound racing started after Glamorgan County Cricket Club moved out of the cricket ground (known as the north ground) to Sophia Gardens in 1966. The north ground was subsequently demolished and a new rugby union stadium built in its place for Cardiff RFC, who would move out of the Arms Park because Cardiff Athletic Club had transferred the freehold of the Arms Park (south ground) to the Welsh Rugby Union in July 1968. This still left a greyhound track around the Arms Park but despite the Welsh Derby gaining classic status there was no place for greyhound racing when the plans for the new National Stadium were drawn up on the site in 1977 by the Cardiff City Council. The council had taken less than ten minutes to reject a plan to switch greyhound racing to nearby Maindy Stadium.

== Closure ==
The last Welsh Greyhound Derby was on 9 July. The last meeting was held on 30 July 1977 which attracted just 1,128 greyhound fans who witnessed Lillyput Queen, owned by Cardiff butcher Malcolm Davies and trained by Freddie Goodman, win the last race. After the closure, greyhound racing in Wales remained on only three flapping (unlicensed) tracks, Swansea, Bedwellty Greyhound Track and Ystrad Mynach.

Harry George secretary of Greyhound Company Cardiff failed in a bid for Oxford Stadium following Cardiff's closure.

== Competitions ==
- Welsh Greyhound Derby
- Glamorgan Cup

== Track records ==
Distance (yards)	Greyhound	Time	Date	Notes
300	Montforte Louis	16.45	30 July 1965	
500	Beef Cutlet	28.41	1932	Glamorgan Gold Cup
500	Trev's Perfection	28.00	1947	
500	Rushton Mac		1955	
525	Negro's Lad	29.54	6 July 1946	Welsh Greyhound Derby Final
525	Local Interprize	29.32	28 July 1948	Welsh Greyhound Derby Final
525	Ballycurreen Garrett	29.22	8 July 1950	Welsh Greyhound Derby Final
525	Mile Bush Pride	28.80	4 July 1959	Welsh Greyhound Derby Final
700	Chieftain Wonder	40.19	1963	
880	Dunmore Rocco	51.96	1960	
525 H	Garrahylish Guy	29.88	11 September 1965	

== See also ==
- Cardiff Arms Park
