= The Cambridgeshire =

Greyhound racing competition

- Location: West Ham Stadium; White City Stadium
- Inaugurated: 1936
- Final run: 1982

Race information
- Distance: various

The Cambridgeshire was a greyhound racing competition held annually. It was inaugurated in 1936 at West Ham Stadium.

Following the closure of West Ham in 1972 the competition switched to White City Stadium but only lasted until 1982 when it was discontinued following the closure of White City.

== Past winners ==
Year	Winner	Breeding	Trainer	Time	SP
1936	Master Hector	Bryn Acton - Milano	Johnny Bullock (West Ham)	22.55	4-1
1937	Diamond Glory	Kilnaglory – Ten Diamonds	Ronnie Melville (Private)	22.78	5-1
1938	Orlucks Best	Orluck – Playaway	Charlie Ashley Harringay)	22.89	2-1f
1942	Train	Danielli – Tiang	L Bradford (Private)	29.89	
1943	Up The Aisle		Mrs Meg Fairbrass (Walthamstow)	29.93	4-7f
1944	Up The Aisle		Mrs Meg Fairbrass (Walthamstow)	29.59	9-4
1945	Cockeyed Cutlet	Jesmond Cutlet – Bradwell Gypsy	Jack Harvey (Wembley)	22.58	7-2
1946	Terrys Monarch		L Gould (Private)	22.27	5-4f
1947	Honey Boy Finnigan		Johnny Bullock (West Ham)	22.35	6-4f
1948	King Hero		P E Frost (Kings Heath)	22.24	100-8
1949	Belingas Fancy	Grovesnor Flexion - Belinga	Stanley Biss (Private)	19.66	4-5f
1951	Dead on Dick		Paddy Gordon (Private)	19.31	9-2
1952	Stir Hard		Noreen Collin (Walthamstow)	19.38	5-2
1954	Snow White Brown	Captain Brown – New Lady Tanist	Henry Parsons (Crayford)	19.52	7-4
1955	Customers Son	Quare Customer – Albert Street Lassie	Jim Syder Jr. (Wembley)	29.98	7-4f
1956	Snow Trails	The Grand Champion - Jazzello	Reg 'String' Marsh (Walthamstow)	29.59	9-2
1957	Gallant And Gay	Champion Prince - Consequence	Joe Pickering Harringay)	29.57	7-1
1958	Moyne Rosette	Atomic Palm – Sarah Bell	Ken Appleton (West Ham)	29.54	11-2
1959	Mellow April	Imperial Dancer – Moody Dreamer	Noreen Collin (Private)	29.91	7-2
1960	Fearless Mac	Ballymac Ball – Dare Me Now	Joe De Mulder (Private)	34.45	4-7f
1961	Palms Printer	The Grand Champion – Palm Shadow	Paddy McEvoy (Clapton)	34.90	
1962	Printers Present	Hi There - Faoide	Tony Dennis (Private)	33.75	
1963	Dainty Spark	Hi There – Wild Prince	W Taylor (White City)	34.44	
1964	Speed Rue	Prince of Speed – Craney Primrose	R.E.Dalton (Private)	34.40	
1965	Clahane Black	Sallys Black – Clahane Rose	Noreen Collin (Private)	34.40	
1966	Clinker	The Grand Fire – Now There	Jimmy Jowett (Clapton)	34.78	
1967	Joans Boy	Lucky Wonder – Lucky Joan	Arthur Hancock (Brighton)	34.48	20-1
1968	Merry Diver	Good Brandy – Charlies Pension	Tom Johnston Jr. (West Ham)	34.19	
1969	Ballyseedy Star	Shanes Legacy – Ballyseedy Jay	Peter Hawkesley (West Ham)	33.88	
1970	Sir Ginger	The Grand Silver – Cathys Tiny	Freddie Warrell (Private)	33.49	
1971	Bobs Return	Granada Chief – Susie Tulla	Tom Johnston Jr. (Wembley)	33.54	7-4f
1972	First Case	Lovely Weather – Tat Tue Lady	Tom Johnston Jr. (Wembley)	30.38	6-4f
1973	Coin Case	Finolas Yarn – Lovely Silk	Charlie Smoothy (Clapton)	30.42	
1974	Myrtown	Myross Again – Longstown Lassie	Eddie Moore – White City (Man)	30.38	
1975	Adioss	Sole Aim – Charlie Knows	Adam Jackson (White City)	29.64	
1976	Mutts Silver	The Grand Silver – Simple Pride	Phil Rees Sr. (Wimbledon)	30.38	2-1
1977	Bohergloss Swell	Kilbelin Style – Walterstown Miss	Geoff De Mulder (Hall Green)	29.30	3-1
1978	Pat Seamur	Tullig Rambler – Dainty Black	Geoff De Mulder (Hall Green)	29.41	
1979	Tic'n Tot	Ritas Choice – Fur Collar	Jack Coker (Oxford)	29.45	
1980	Under Par	Gaily Noble - Overture		29.41	
1981	Thanks Kev	Ahaveen Spitfire – Slide Over Baby	Frank Melville (Harringay)	29.67	2-1
1982	Astrosyn Doll	Itsachampion – Ivy Hall Sally	Frank Melville (White City)	29.83	7-1

== Venues & Distances ==
- 1936-1938 (West Ham 400 yards)
- 1942-1944 (West Ham 525 yards)
- 1945-1948 (West Ham 400 yards)
- 1949-1954 (West Ham yards)
- 1955-1959 (West Ham 525 yards)
- 1960-1971 (West Ham 600 yards)
- 1972-1974 (White City 550 yards)
- 1975-1982 (White City 500 metres)

== Sponsors ==
- 1979-1979 Haig
