= 1955 English Greyhound Derby =

- Location: White City Stadium
- Start date: 11 June
- End date: 25 June

The 1955 Greyhound Derby took place during June with the final being held on 25 June 1955 at White City Stadium. The winner was Rushton Mac and the winning owners Frank Johnson and Mary Johnson received £1,500.

== Final result ==
At White City (over 525 yards):

Position	Name of Greyhound	Breeding	Trap	SP	Time	Trainer
1st	Rushton Mac	Rushton News - Rushton Panda	2	5-1	28.97	Frank Johnson (Private)
2nd	Barrowside	Ballymac Ball - Nifty Bella	3	1-2f	29.03	Jack Harvey (Wembley)
3rd	Coolkill Chieftain	Celtic Chief - Coolkill Darkie	4	100-7	29.39	Jack Harvey (Wembley)
4th	Gulf of Honduras	Imperial Dancer - Daring Belle	6	8-1	29.47	Jack Harvey (Wembley)
5th	Home Straight	Jeffs Pal - Honey Bear	1	100-6	29.61	Tom Lightfoot (White City - London)
6th	Duet Leader	Champion Prince - Derryluskin Lady	5	10-1	29.85	Tom 'Paddy' Reilly (Walthamstow)

=== Distances ===
¾, 4½, 1, 1¾, 3 (lengths)
The distances between the greyhounds are in finishing order and shown in lengths. From 1950 one length was equal to 0.08 of one second.

== Competition Report ==
The ante-post favourite was Hi There trained by Paddy McEvoy and a winner of the National Sprint in Ireland the previous year. Other leading contenders included defending champion Pauls Fun, Barrowside and the Frank Johnson litter brothers Rushton Mac and Rushton Spot. The Trafalgar Cup winner Golden Sail failed to gain selection in the 48 runner event resulting in his owner Mr Hughes quitting the sport.

After the eight heats the fastest qualifier was Barrowside (28.82 sec). Pauls Fun and Hi There both underperformed but progressed. During the second round Hi There finished lame but would become a legendary stud dog. Pauls Fun now trained by Joe Booth also succumbed to injury being withdrawn from his heat. Duet Leader a fawn dog trained by Tom Reilly won easily and Barrowside remained unbeaten.

The semi-finals produced another victory for Barrowside and the Grand National champion was installed as the hot favourite to win the final. The second semi-final was won by Rushton Mac following a tough battle with Laurels champion Coolkill Chieftain.

Wembley trainer Jack Harvey had three of the finalists in his attempt to gain a second Derby title. Barrowside started at very short odds of 1-2 and made a good start followed by Home Straight and Rushton Mac. Rushton Mac moved towards the rails and took the lead on the back straight only for Barrowside to respond and take the lead by the fourth bend but Rushton Mac came again to win by three quarters. Coolkill Chieftain ran on well for third place.

== See also ==
- 1955 UK & Ireland Greyhound Racing Year
