= 1927 English Greyhound Derby =

Greyhound racing event

- Location: White City Stadium

The 1927 Greyhound Derby took place during October 1927 with the final being held on 15 October 1927 at White City Stadium. The competition was inaugurated by the Greyhound Racing Association and the prize money was substantial with £1,000 and a gold cup given to the winner, £300 to the runner-up and £100 to third place. This greyhound racing event began with heats at regional level, with winners progressing to a Northern final and Southern final prior to a national final at White City. The Derby would soon be established as the most significant race in UK greyhound racing.

== Race ==
The first three in each of the Northern and Southern finals were invited to the final, which was run at White City over a distance of 500 yards (460 m). The qualifiers from the Northern final were Great Chum, Elder Brother and Banderloo but Great Chum was replaced by Derham Boy for the final because of illness. The Southern final was won by Entry Badge by four lengths in a time of 29.20 seconds.

This was the first ever Derby final and was held on 15 October 1927. It was won in a time of 29.01 seconds by Entry Badge, a brindled dog weighing 66 pounds (30 kg), trained by Joe Harmon and owned by Edwin Baxter. Ever Bright came second, six lengths behind. Baxter owned the first three home.

Entry Badge, who had cost Baxter 40 guineas, was a granddaughter of a great coursing dog called Hopsack.

== Final result ==
At White City (over 500 yards):

Pos	Name of Greyhound	Breeding	Trap	SP	Time	Trainer
1st	Entry Badge	Jamie - Beaded Nora	5	1-4f	29.01	Joe Harmon (White City - London)
2nd	Ever Bright	Jocks Lodge -Beautiful Style	1	100-6	29.49	John 'Jack' Kennedy (Harringay)
3rd	Elder Brother	Skeets - Beaded Fly	4	100-8	29.53	Jack Rimmer (Liverpool)
4th	Toftwood Millsack	Harbuckle - Haversack	3	10-1	29.55	Harry Buck (Harringay)
5th	Derham Boy (Reserve)	Hill Sixty II - Crosswell Belle	2	20-1	29.79	Hughes (Powderhall)
6th	Banderloo	Nefarious Nettle - Gally Lass	6	100-8	29.87	Jack Buck (Belle Vue)
N/R	Great Chum	Woon - Chronic Cough				Jack Buck (Belle Vue)

=== Distances ===
6, ½, head, 3, 1 (lengths)
The distances between the greyhounds are in finishing order and shown in lengths. From 1927–1950 one length was equal to 0.06 of one second but race times are shown as 0.08 as per modern day calculations.

== Semi finals ==
First Semi Final (White City, Oct 8) Southern Championship and Evening News Cup
Pos	Name of Greyhound	SP	Time	Trainer
1st	Entry Badge	1-4f	29.00	Harmon (White City)
2nd	Toftwood Millsack	20-1	29.32	Buck (Harringay)
3rd	Ever Bight	10-1	29.29	Kennedy (Harringay)
u	Roving Ben	100-6	29.61	Sharman (Hall Green)
u	Knockane Lass	20-1	29.67	Cross (Hall Green)
u	Cruiseline Boy	10-1	29.91	Harmon (White City)

Second Semi Final (Belle Vue, Oct 8) Northern Championship
Pos	Name of Greyhound	SP	Time	Trainer
1st	Great Chum	11/8f		Buck (Belle Vue)
2nd	Elder Brother			Rimmer (Stanley, Liverpool)
3rd	Banderlo			Buck (Belle Vue)
u	Derham Boy +			Hughes (Powderhall)
u	Electric Wire			(Powderhall)
u	Big Drum			(Stanley, Liverpool)

+ Called in as reserve for the final
u=unplaced

== See also ==
- 1927 UK & Ireland Greyhound Racing Year
