= 1956 English Greyhound Derby =

- Location: White City Stadium
- Start date: 16 June
- End date: 30 June
- Total prize money: £1,500 (winner)

The 1956 Greyhound Derby took place during June with the final being held on 30 June 1956 at White City Stadium. The winner was Dunmore King and the winning owner Mr Jack McAlister (an Irish farmer) received £1,500.

== Final result ==
At White City (over 525 yards):

Position	Name of Greyhound	Breeding	Trap	SP	Time	Trainer
1st	Dunmore King	Shaggy Lad -Dunmore Dancer	3	7-2	29.22	Paddy McEvoy (Clapton)
2nd	Duet Leader	Champion Prince - Derryluskin Lady	2	2-1	29.26	Tom 'Paddy' Reilly (Walthamstow)
2nd	Gulf of Darien	Imperial Dancer - Dorothy Ann	6	10-1	29.26	Jack Harvey (Wembley)
4th	Northern King	Champion Prince - Big Bawn	4	6-4f	29.34	Jack Harvey (Wembley)
5th	Grandbally Shaun	The Grand Champion - Rio Catriona	5	100-6	29.58	Jack Harvey (Wembley)
6th	Quick Surprise	Champion Prince - Quick Enough	1	25-1	29.72	Pat Mullins (Portsmouth)

=== Distances ===
½, dead heat, 1, 3, 1¾ (lengths)
The distances between the greyhounds are in finishing order and shown in lengths. From 1950 one length was equal to 0.08 of one second.

== Competition Report ==
Shipping magnate Noel Purvis owned a four strong team heading into the 1956 Derby led by Gulf of Darien the Cesarewitch champion. Two litter brothers called Northern King and Northern Champion and the fast starting Belingas Customer completed the quartet. Rushton Mac returned for his third Derby looking to match the two Derby wins of Mick the Miller. Two finalists from the previous year also lined up, Grand Prix and Laurels champions Duet Leader and Home Straight.

Rushton Mac progressed no further than the first round which resulted in his connections retiring him to stud. All of the market leaders progressed to round two and both Northern King and Northern Champion recorded wins and both of the other two Purvis runners finished second in their heats. Northern King had set the fastest qualifying time so far with a 28.86 defeating Duet Leader and Home Straight in the process. Another greyhound called Dunmore King had eased through each round; this fawn dog had arrived from Ireland after winning the McAlevey Gold Cup at Celtic Park. He was put with Paddy McEvoy after Irish owner/trainer Jack McAllister sent the dog with his head lad Barney O’Connor accompanying him.

The semi-finals and Dunmore King was matched in a strong heat with Northern Champion, Gulf of Darien and Home Straight. Dunmore King soon led and won easily, Home Straight and Northern Champion both faded badly on the final straight allowing Gulf of Darien and Quick Surprise to qualify. In the second semi-final Northern King continued his outstanding form with a trap to line victory in a very fast 28.75, Duet Leader missed the break but ran on well for second and Grandbally Shaun caught Belingas Customer to claim third place.

In the final Duet leader broke well as the traps opened but Dunmore King's early pace took him into the lead at the first bend. Northern King missed the break but showed enough early pace to join the two leaders at halfway and then challenge the lead at the third bend. Northern King clipped Duet Leader's heels causing both of them to lose any chance of winning. The tiring Dunmore King held on by just half a length with Gulf of Darien finishing well to dead heat with Duet leader for second place.

== See also ==
- 1956 UK & Ireland Greyhound Racing Year
