= 1955 UK & Ireland Greyhound Racing Year =

The 1955 UK & Ireland Greyhound Racing Year was the 30th year of greyhound racing in the United Kingdom and the 29th year of greyhound racing in Ireland.

== Roll of honour ==
Major Winners
Award	Name of Winner
1955 English Greyhound Derby	Rushton Mac
1955 Irish Greyhound Derby	Spanish Battleship
1955 Scottish Greyhound Derby	Not held
1955 Welsh Greyhound Derby	Rushton Mac
Greyhound of the Year	Rushton Mac

== Summary ==
Spanish Battleship became the greatest greyhound in Irish history by securing a third consecutive Irish Greyhound Derby title. No other greyhound had managed to win more than one Irish Derby previously. Before retiring, he broke the track record at Cork during his Laurels victory and won another McCalmont Cup title. His connections turned down a £15,000 bid from a London syndicate. Rushton Mac defeated the versatile and hot favourite Barrowside in the English Greyhound Derby final.

== Competitions ==
Barrowside dominated the Grand National at White City, the red fawn dog claimed a five length victory at odds of 1-3 in a track record time of 29.43. The Gold Collar at Catford Stadium was won by Firgrove Slipper, a competition that featured 1953 English Greyhound Derby champion Daws Dancer.

The new Derby champion Rushton Mac won the Welsh Greyhound Derby at Cardiff Arms Park, winning the final by nine lengths, flattering because the race turned into chaos as three runners fell. Derby finalists Gulf of Honduras and Coolkill Chieftain finished second and third respectively. The Scottish Greyhound Derby was cancelled again, denying Rushton Mac the opportunity to win the Triple Crown. He had won the Scottish event in 1954 to hold all three titles at the same time but had not won all three during the same year.

Rushton Mac completed a successful year by defending his Northern Flat and Edinburgh Cup titles. Duet Leader also had a great year winning the Laurels at Wimbledon Stadium, the Pall Mall Stakes, Select Stakes and Grand Prix at Walthamstow Stadium.

Lizette won the Oaks, two years after her first triumph and her half brother Gulf of Darien won the Cesarewitch.

== News ==
Wandsworth Stadium hurdle grader, Moyshna Queen starred alongside Frankie Howerd in a film called Jumping for Joy. The bitch was called Lindy Lou in the film.

In November the Greyhound Racing Association (GRA) applied for a special licence to allow Spanish Battleship to line up against two of England's leading greyhounds, Duet Leader and Hi There, in a triangular match race. The match saw the GRA put up £120, in addition to the three owners adding 125 guineas; Spanish Battleship (Tim O'Connor), Duet Leader (Mrs Frances Chandler) and Hi There (Jack McAllister). Home Straight stood as reserve. The legendary Irish hound Spanish Battleship travelled to England for the first time with White City as his destination but age and the travelling had caught up with him, because home track advantage proved decisive and he trailed in third. Tom Lynch and Tim O'Connor retired him to stud.

== Principal UK races ==
Grand National, White City (May 7 525y h, £300)
Pos	Name of Greyhound	Trainer	SP	Time	Trap
1st	Barrowside	Jack Harvey	1-3f	29.43+	1
2nd	Turn Back	Dave Geggus	6-1	29.83	2
3rd	Roguish Shaggy	Peter Hawkesley	10-1	30.01	6
4th	Daring Son	Bert Heyes	25-1	30.23	5
5th	Spotless O'Leer	Joe Pickering	100-7	30.26	4
6th	Gifted Composer	White City	50-1	30.44	3

+Track Record

Gold Collar, Catford (May 28, 440y, £500)
Pos	Name of Greyhound	Trainer	SP	Time	Trap
1st	Firgrove Slipper	Jim Syder Jr.	7-2	26.35	6
2nd	Wild Flower	Jack Harvey	6-4f	26.38	4
3rd	Daws Dancer	Sidney Orton	6-1	26.58	5
4th	Sandown Bouncer		20-1	27.78	2
5th	Shauns Thief	Paddy McEllistrim	8-1	28.26	3
6th	Chance Me Paddy	Robert Linney	3-1	00.00	1

Welsh Derby, Arms Park (Jul 2, 525y £500)
Pos	Name of Greyhound	Trainer	SP	Time	Trap
1st	Rushton Mac	Frank Johnson	1-2f	29.40	4
2nd	Gulf of Honduras	Jack Harvey	6-1	30.12	2
3rd	Coolkill Chieftain	Jack Harvey	14-1	30.30	5
4th	The Cure	Ron Chamberlain	10-1	00.00	6
5th	Broadway Darkie II	Pam Heasman	5-1	00.00	3
6th	Imperial Fawn	George Crussell	8-1	00.00	1

Scurry Gold Cup, Clapton (Jul 23, 400y £600)
Pos	Name of Greyhound	Trainer	SP	Time	Trap
1st	Chance Me Paddy	Robert Linney	2-1f	22.85	6
2nd	Even Gait	G Holyhead	3-1	23.11	5
3rd	The Grand Champagne	Jack Harvey	7-2	23.25	2
4th	Daring Imp	Dave Geggus	3-1	23.63	4
5th	Rather Cheerful	Henry Parsons	20-1	23.99	3
N/R	Smokey Captain				

Laurels, Wimbledon (Aug 20, 500y, £1.000)
Pos	Name of Greyhound	Trainer	SP	Time	Trap
1st	Duet Leader	Tom Reilly	7-4	28.25	1
2nd	Step Inside	Ron Chamberlain	33-1	28.45	2
3rd	Gulf of Honduras	Jack Harvey	13-2	28.47	5
4th	Rushton Mac	Frank Johnson	5-4f	28.65	3
5th	Tax Diablo	Jim Syder Jr.	10-1	28.83	6
6th	Fife Fiddler	Jack Harvey	20-1	28.95	4

St Leger, Wembley (Sep 12, 700y, £1,000)
Pos	Name of Greyhound	Trainer	SP	Time	Trap
1st	Title Role	Jack Harvey	4-1	40.78	6
2nd	Copac Gwen	Leslie Reynolds	100-6	40.79	2
3rd	Black Magic II	Jim Hookway	11-2	40.80	5
4th	Ashcott Boy	Dickie Myles	4-1	40.86	1
5th	Gulf of Darien	Jack Harvey	6-4f	40.94	4
6th	Shauns Tip	Wembley	7-1	41.38	3

The Grand Prix Walthamstow (Sep 27, 525y, £500)
Pos	Name of Greyhound	Trainer	SP	Time	Trap
1st	Duet Leader	Tom Reilly	13-8f	29.42	6
2nd	Tax Diablo	Jim Syder Jr.	5-2	29.66	5
3rd	Rushton Mac	Frank Johnson	5-1	29.78	4
4th	Even Gait	G Holyhead	5-1	30.02	1
5th	Rushton Spot	Frank Johnson	100-6	30.14	2
6th	Gulf of Honduras	Jack Harvey	8-1	30.30	3

Oaks, White City (Oct 1, 525y, £500)
Pos	Name of Greyhound	Trainer	SP	Time	Trap
1st	Lizette	Jack Harvey	6-4	29.52	4
2nd	Dearly Dawn	Harry Buck	5-4f	29.53	1
3rd	Racing Rhapsody	Catford	25-1	29.59	6
4th	Victory Christina	Ken Appleton	100-7	29.65	5
5th	Tanist Shade		20-1	29.68	3
6th	Ballinasloe Ballerina	Wembley	5-1	29.84	2

Cesarewitch, West Ham (Oct 14, 600y, £600)
Pos	Name of Greyhound	Trainer	SP	Time	Trap
1st	Gulf Of Darien	Jack Harvey	4-6f	32.99+	2
2nd	Customers Son	Jim Syder Jr.	5-2	33.31	1
3rd	Atta Tanist	Tom Reilly	100-8	33.67	6
4th	Pancho Villa	Jack Harvey	10-1	33.77	3
5th	Black Magic II	Jim Hookway	100-6	33.81	5
6th	Manganstown Major	Ron Chamberlain	33-1	33.95	4

+Track Record
