= Cambridgeshire (disambiguation) =

Cambridgeshire is a county in England.

Cambridgeshire may also refer to:

- Cambridgeshire (UK Parliament constituency), (1290–1885 and 1918–1983)
- Cambridgeshire (European Parliament constituency) (1979–1984 and 1994–1999)
- HMT Cambridgeshire (FY142), a British armed trawler
- Cambridgeshire Handicap, a horse race run at Newmarket racecourse
- The Cambridgeshire, a greyhound race run between 1936 and 1982
