= Edinburgh Cup (greyhounds) =

- Class: Category 1
- Location: Powderhall Stadium
- Inaugurated: 1933
- Final run: 1995

Race information
- Distance: 465 metres
- Surface: Sand

The Edinburgh Cup was a greyhound racing competition held annually at Powderhall Stadium in Powderhall, Scotland.

It was inaugurated in 1933 and was considered one of the major competitions in the greyhound calendar. In Scotland only the Scottish Greyhound Derby was held in higher esteem.

Two English Greyhound Derby winners Rushton Mac and Pigalle Wonder both won the competition on two occasions.

The race ended in 1995 following the closure of Powderhall Stadium.

== Past winners ==
Year	Winner	Breeding	Trainer	Time	SP	Notes
1933	S.L.D	Gaulsmill-Kitty Kelly	Jack Tallantire (Powderhall)	28.64	11-8f	
1934	Tosto	Border Line - Ranting Rhyme	A Patterson (Powderhall)	28.72	5-4jf	
1935	Good Redress	Red Robin - Melksham Elaine	Albert Jonas (White City - London)	28.62	11-10f	
1936	Banksell	Elsell - Eskbank	John Dickenson (Belle Vue)	28.64	4-6f	
1937	Jesmond Cutlet	Beef Cutlet - Lady Eleanor	Dal Hawkesley (Catford)	28.30	2-7f	
1938	Wattle Bark	Secret Chance - Helena Kane	Leslie Reynolds (White City - London)	28.82	4-6f	
1945	Gourna Bridge	Talon - Sheevras Sheen	A B Sidney (Carntyne)	28.25	1-1f	
1946	Dante II	Well Squared - Olives Idol	Wilf France (Harringay)	28.51	7-2	
1947	Clan Cameron	G.R.Admiral - Noramac	W McLean (Powderhall)	28.57	5-1	
1948	Stoneyhill Sweep	Darkies Gift - Lovely Nurse	Harry Ward (Powderhall)	28.39	6-1	
1951	Rushton Smutty	Mad Tanist - Summer Frock	Frank Johnson (Private)	28.16	1-6f	
1952	Foolish Billy	Old Invader - Sylvester Cherokee	Bert Heyes (White City - London)	28.20	1-1f	
1953	Polonius	Mad Tanist - Calpurnia	Tom Paddy Reilly (Walthamstow)	28.07	1-1f	
1954	Rushton Mac	Rushton News - Rushton Panda	Frank Johnson (Private)	27.81	5-4	
1955	Rushton Mac	Rushton News - Rushton Panda	Ronnie Melville (Wembley)	28.39	4-9f	
1956	Belinga's Customer	Quare Customer - Another Belinger	Jack Harvey (Wembley)	28.82	11-4	
1957	Northern King	Champion Prince - Big Bawn	Jack Harvey (Wembley)	28.22	3-1	
1958	Pigalle Wonder	Champion Prince - Prairie Peg	Jim Syder Jr. (Wembley)	28.10	1-2f	
1959	Pigalle Wonder	Champion Prince - Prairie Peg	Jim Syder Jr. (Wembley)	28.08	4-5f	
1960	Skibbereen Rocket	Ballymac Ball - Aughadown Flirt	G Rodgerson (Powderhall)	28.38	6-1	
1961	Faithful Charlie	Glittering Look - Lady Artic	Jim Irving (Private)	28.02	4-7f	
1962	Montforte Jo Jo	Manganstown Major - Copper Glen	G.W.Barnett (Private)	28.29	9-4jf	
1963	We'll See	Knock Hill Chieftain - Bunnykins	Tommy Johnston Jr. (Carntyne)	28.03	1-1f	
1964	Ocean Roll	Hi There - Ocean Swell	Bill Weir (Private)	28.07	10-1	
1965	Clonmannon Flash	Prairie Flash - Dainty Sister	Jim Hookway (Owlerton)	28.14	4-6f	
1966	I'm Quickest	Skips Choice - Grattan Star	Randy Singleton (White City - London)	28.33	3-1	
1967	Negro Harpist	Oregon Prince - Imperial Astra	Jim Irving (Private)	27.94	5-2	
1968	Kerry Long Ago	Bauhus - Kerry Piper	Paddy Milligan (Private)	28.04	7-4f	
1969	Rockfield Era	Mad Era - Whittle Down	J Doyle (Shawfield)	28.40	2-1	
1970	The Other Green	Prairie Flash - The Other Flash	Jim Irving (Private)	28.10	4-7f	
1971	Supreme Fun	Newdown Heather - Top Note	Sid Ryall - Private	28.08	1-2f	
1972	Say Little	Albany - Newhouse Blue	Colin McNally (Perry Barr)	27.91	2-1	
1973	Deelside Silver	Silver Hope - Dusty Prim	Tommy Kane (Private)	28.14	9-2	
1974	Bealkilla Diver	Sallys Yarn - Bealkilla Queen	Pat Mullins (Private)	28.20	7-1	
1975	Tory Mor	Toms Pal - Melville Money	Paddy Milligan (Private)	27.67	7-4	Track record
1976	Gaily Noble	Monalee Champion - Noble Lynn	John Coleman (Wembley)	28.24	6-1	
1977	Linacre	Lively Band - Certral	Ted Dickson (Slough)	27.91	11-10f	
1978	Dale Lad	Bright Lad - Kerry's Pal	Geoff De Mulder (Coventry)	28.07	100-30	
1979	Jon Barrie	Clashing - Famous Heart	Ray Andrews (Leeds)	28.25	3-1	
1980	Jelly Crock	Lindas Champion - Mosey Ada	Matt Travers (Ireland)	28.35	4-5f	
1981	Deel Joker	Free Speech - Leaping Lady	John Gibbons (Crayford)	28.07	6-4f	
1982	Brief Candle	Peruvian Style - Sky Banner	Paddy Hancox (Perry Barr)	27.98	6-4	
1983	Creamery Cross	Knockrour Slave - Creamery Alice	Allen Briggs (Private)	28.18	3-1	
1984	Creamery Cross	Knockrour Slave - Creamery Alice	Allen Briggs (Private)	28.35	6-1	
1985	Smokey Pete	Smokey Flame - Smokey Cotton	Kenny Linzell (Walthamstow)	28.34	7-4	
1986	Coolamber Forest	Coolamber Tank - Coolamber Pet	Matt O'Sullivan (Ireland)	28.26	10-1	
1987	Princes Pal	Cronins Bar - Ballea Oshkosh	Matt Travers (Ireland)	28.32	11-10f	
1988	Pond Hurricane	Lindas Champion - Soda Pop II	Harry Williams (Brough Park)	28.92	4-9f	
1989	Intelligent Lad	Burnpark Black - Face The Dawn	Dawn Milligan (Brough Park)	28.21	5-1	
1990	Social Circle	Nelsons Dasher - Gorgeous	Linda Mullins (Romford)	28.22	4-5f	
1991	Glenpark Again	Whisper Wishes - Ballycrine Style	Willie Frew (Shawfield)	28.09	7-1	
1992	Murlens Abbey	Daleys Gold - Murlens Toe	John Copplestone (Portsmouth)	28.00	4-6f	
1993	James John	Manorville Major - Frisky White	Davie Neill (Powderhall)	27.69	12-1	
1994	Highway Leader	Leaders Best - Highway Mystery	Michael Bacon (Perry Barr)	28.08	15-8f	
1995	Analysis	Mid Clare Champ - Glenmoira	Francie Murray (Ireland)	29.49	5-2	

Discontinued

== Sponsors ==
- 1982-1982 Kenny Waugh Bookmakers
- 1994-1994 Regal

== Venues & Distances ==
- 1933-1971 (Powderhall 500 yards)
- 1975-1995 (Powderhall 465 metres)
