= 1959 Irish Greyhound Derby =

- Venue: Harold's Cross Stadium
- Location: Dublin
- End date: 7 August
- Total prize money: £500 (winner)

The 1959 Irish Greyhound Derby took place during July and August with the final being held at Harold's Cross Stadium in Dublin on 7 August 1959.

The winner Sir Frederick won £500 and was trained by Tom Harty, owned by Mrs Hannah Cronin and bred by Jimmy Walsh.

== Final result ==
At Harold's Cross, 7 August (over 525 yards):

Position	Name of Greyhound	Breeding	Trap	SP	Time	Trainer
1st	Sir Frederick	Champion Prince - Charming Biddy	5	9-4	29.30	Tom Harty
2nd	Gallant Winner	Knockrour Again - Mixed Stone	6	1-1f	29.62	John Crowley
3rd	Snowland Battleship	Spanish Battleship - unknown	1	8-1	29.90	Jim O'Reilly
4th	Recorded Course	Magic Bimbo - Recording Crystal	3	100-7		
5th	Skipit Laddie	Ballinclea Dancer - Skipit Quick	4	7-1		Maeve McCooey
6th	Prairie Chieftain	Champion Prince - Peaceful Lady	2	20-1		Tom Lynch

=== Distances ===
4, 3½ (lengths)

== Competition Report ==
Sir Frederick had been knocked over in the second round of the 1959 English Greyhound Derby and when he returned home his trainer Tom Harty aimed at the Irish Derby. He was the fastest round one winner in 29.32. One of the leading favourites and track record holder Fauna also impressed by winning in a time of 29.34 and Derrylava Mover recorded 29.45.

In the second round Fauna was eliminated, finishing fourth behind Gallant Winner in 29.41. Other winners were Sir Frederick (29.60), Winged Heels (29.80) and Recorded Course 30.02. The two undefeated greyhounds Sir Frederick and Gallant Winner (both from Kanturk) were drawn together in the semi-finals and both qualified for the final when Gallant Winner beat Sir Frederick in a fast 29.40; recorded Course took third place and the a slot in the final. The second semi-final resulted in victory for Skipit Laddie from Prairie Chieftain and Snowland Battleship in 29.98.

Many residents of the town of Kanturk attended the final on the evening of 7 August to watch the two greyhounds in the final. The brindle dog Sir Frederick beat Gallant Winner by four lengths in the final after a devastating run along the back straight to catch and overtake Gallant Winner and Snowland Battleship. The time of 29.30 was just outside the track record of 29.31 set by Fauna in the recent Callanan Cup. Winning trainer Tom Harty had trained a previous Irish Derby winner in 1935 (24 years previously).

== See also ==
- 1959 UK & Ireland Greyhound Racing Year
