= 1959 UK & Ireland Greyhound Racing Year =

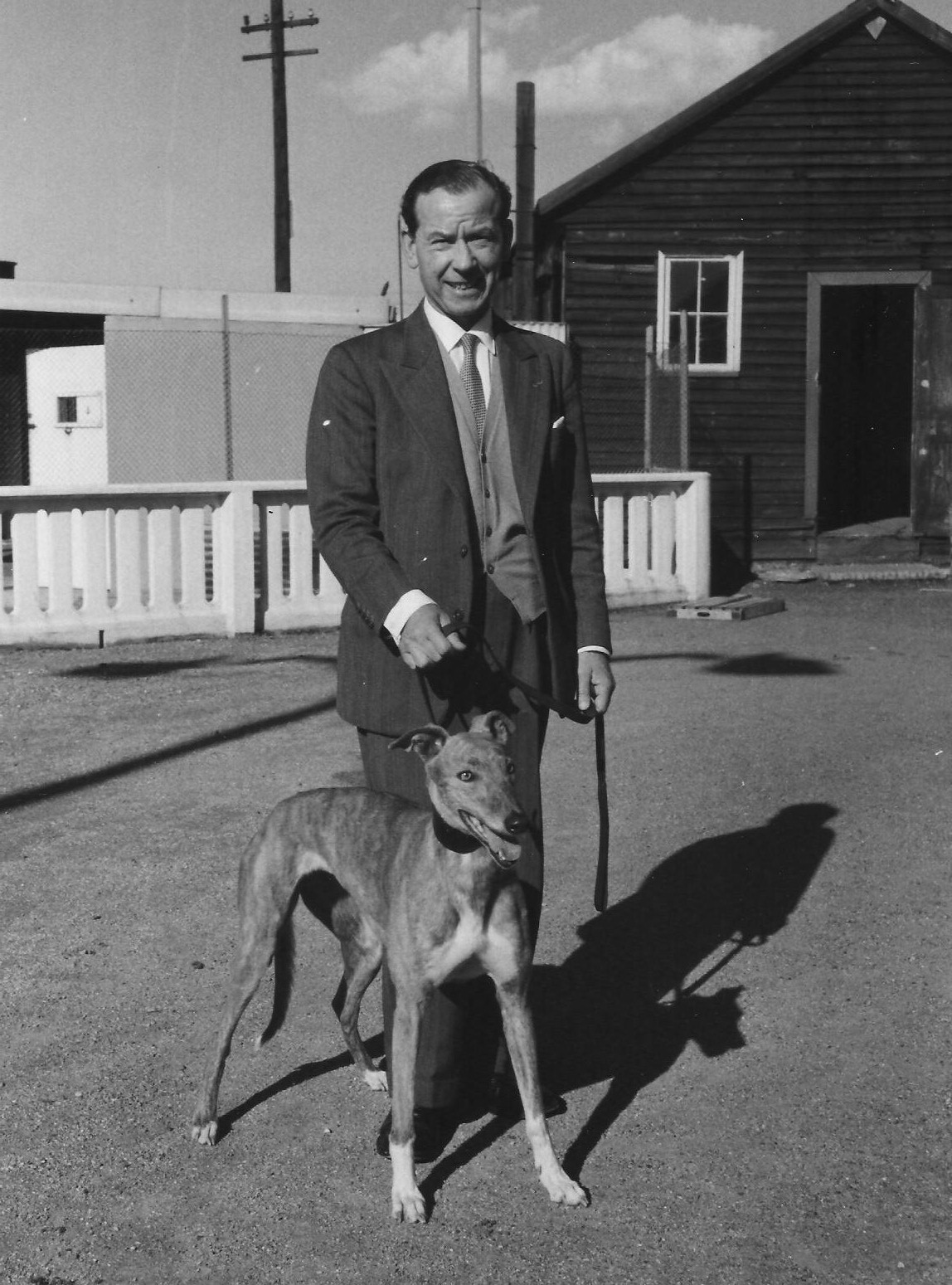
- 1959 Oaks champion Gurteen Scamp

The 1959 UK & Ireland Greyhound Racing Year was the 34th year of greyhound racing in the United Kingdom and the 33rd year of greyhound racing in Ireland.

== Roll of honour ==
Major Winners
Award	Name of Winner
1959 English Greyhound Derby	Mile Bush Pride
1959 Irish Greyhound Derby	Sir Frederick
1959 Scottish Greyhound Derby	Mile Bush Pride
1959 Welsh Greyhound Derby	Mile Bush Pride
Greyhound of the Year	Mile Bush Pride

== Summary ==
Mile Bush Pride was voted Greyhound of the Year after becoming only the second greyhound, after Trev's Perfection to win the Triple Crown which consisted of the English Greyhound Derby, Scottish Greyhound Derby and Welsh Greyhound Derby. Trained by Jack Harvey for owner Noel Purvis, a shipping magnate, the brindle greyhound also won the Pall Mall, Select Stakes and Cesarewitch in 1959.

== Competitions ==
Irish Greyhound Derby champion Colonel Perry moved kennels from John Bassett to Tom Baldwin and finished a disappointing fourth in the final of the Gold Collar behind Dunstown Warrior. After his English Greyhound Derby success, Mile Bush Pride ran out an eleven and a quarter winner of the Welsh Derby, in 28.80 seconds, eclipsing the previous track record by over five lengths. Mile Bush Pride then achieved the Triple Crown by winning the Scottish Derby in 29.41, beating the defending champion Just Fame by eight lengths.

During 1959 Pigalle Wonder won the Anglo-Irish International, the Wood Lane Stakes and successfully defended his Edinburgh Cup title.

== News ==
Charlie Birch became the new Racing Manager at White City and the Oaks moved to sister track Harringay Stadium. At the pre-Derby final luncheon at the Dorchester Hotel, Mrs Frances Chandler called for two changes to the sport. First the standardisation of starting traps and secondly the setting up of a greyhound national stud. The National Greyhound Racing Society considered changing the tote deductions at all National Greyhound Racing Club affiliated tracks. The current deduction stands at 16%, of which 10% goes to the government.

It was announced at the London veterinary conference that a vaccine had been found to counteract canine hepatitis. Now both distemper and hepatitis can be controlled.

== Ireland ==
A new track in Ireland opened in the form of Lifford, which was a former schooling track. The venue just south of the Northern Irish border in County Donegal was opened by James Magee. His sons Cathal and Sheamus would help run the track for many years. A track bookmakers strike over the cost of admissions to their staff resulted in racing being halted at many Irish venues.

One of the most prominent sires of all time, The Grand Champion died aged 9½. He had sired many champions including Mile Bush Pride and Palms Printer.

== Principal UK races ==
Grand National, White City (2 May, 525y h, £300)
Pos	Name of Greyhound	Trainer	SP	Time	Trap
1st	Prince Poppit	Dennis Hannafin	3-1	30.10	1
2nd	Looks A Leader	Reg Bosley	5-1	30.11	6
3rd	Khaffra	F.J.Hedley	5-2f	30.19	3
4th	Sammy Light	Jim Syder Jr.	20-1	30.31	2
5th	Tangled Fate	George Waterman	3-1	30.37	5
6th	Foolish Customer	Jimmy Purnell	6-1	30.47	4

BBC Sportsview Trophy West Ham (6 May, 700y, £1,000)
Pos	Name of Greyhound	Trainer	SP	Time	Trap
1st	Dont Divulge	Leslie Reynolds	5-1	38.72	5
2nd	Dunmore Rocco	Dennis Hannafin	1-1f	38.86	4
3rd	Society Wonder	Jim Syder Jr.	13-2	39.02	3
4th	Sailaway Rebel	Joe Pickering	100-8	39.22	1
5th	Polar Airways		33-1	39.42	2
6th	Mink Muff	Joe De Mulder	11-4	39.70	6

Gold Collar, Catford (23 May, 440y, £500)
Pos	Name of Greyhound	Trainer	SP	Time	Trap
1st	Dunstown Warrior	Tom Reilly	11-4	25.77	5
2nd	The Glen Abbey	Joe Pickering	8-1	26.09	6
3rd	Marazion Minister	Stan Martin	100-7	26.21	3
4th	Colonel Perry	Tom Baldwin	15-2	26.41	1
5th	Armour Prince	Jack Harvey	9-4f	26.57	4
6th	Granite Glittering	Tony Dennis	3-1	26.73	2

Welsh Derby, Arms Park (4 Jul, 525y £500)
Pos	Name of Greyhound	Trainer	SP	Time	Trap
1st	Mile Bush Pride	Jack Harvey	8/11f	28.80+	2
2nd	Killahalla	Len Bane	100-8	29.78	1
3rd	Prince of Speed	Jimmy Jowett	100-6	29.86	3
4th	Snub Nose	Jimmy Purnell	5-1	29.98	6
5th	No Wonder	Bob Burls	7-2	30.14	5
6th	Glittering Paver	Wilf France	33-1	30.36	4

+Track record

Oaks, Harringay (6 Jul, 525y, £500)
Pos	Name of Greyhound	Trainer	SP	Time	Trap
1st	Gurteen Scamp	George Waterman	11-2	29.90	4
2nd	Simonette	Les Brown	8-1	30.16	6
3rd	Fancy Cinema	Lewis Hiscock	100-7	30.18	5
4th	Glittering Millie	Tim Forster	5-1	30.24	3
5th	Naughty Judy	Jim Syder Jr.	10-3	30.36	1
6th	Bridgetown Girl	Barney O'Connor	5-4f	00.00	2

Scottish Greyhound Derby, Carntyne (11 Jul, 525y, £500)
Pos	Name of Greyhound	Trainer	SP	Time	Trap
1st	Mile Bush Pride	Jack Harvey	2-7f	29.41	3
2nd	Just Fame	Tom Johnston Sr.	9-2	30.05	4
3rd	Mile From Curraglas	Alan Lake	10-1	30.13	5
4th	Imperial Town	Joe Booth	33-1	30.21	2
5th	Lynmoor	Joe Booth	33-1	30.41	1
N/R	Ollys Quare Breeze				

Scurry Gold Cup, Clapton (25 Jul, 400y £600)
Pos	Name of Greyhound	Trainer	SP	Time	Trap
1st	Gorey Airways	Jimmy Jowett	9-4	22.95	4
2nd	Imperial Bar	Dennis Hannafin	5-1	23.17	6
3rd	Westland Cleo	Paddy Keane	7-1	23.41	3
4th	Supreme King	Tom Smith	7-4f	23.45	1
5th	Wild Look	Stan Martin	8-1	23.55	2
6th	Comrade	Reg String Marsh	100-7	23.69	5

Laurels, Wimbledon (21 Aug, 500y, £1,000)
Pos	Name of Greyhound	Trainer	SP	Time	Trap
1st	Mighty Hassan	Jack Harvey	5-1	28.01	1
2nd	Tailors Cheerful	Tom Reilly	5-1	28.19	3
3rd	Davy Crickett	Bob Burls	66-1	28.25	2
4th	Mile Bush Pride	Jack Harvey	10-11f	28.33	5
5th	Derry Waltz	Stan Martin	50-1	28.89	4
6th	Leighlin Champion	Barney O'Connor	4-1	00.00	6

St Leger, Wembley (7 Sep, 700y, £1,000)
Pos	Name of Greyhound	Trainer	SP	Time	Trap
1st	Wincot Clifford	Jack Toseland	5-4f	40.25	1
2nd	Princess Jester	Jack Harvey	11-4	40.27	3
3rd	Snub Nose	Jimmy Purnell	8-1	40.51	2
4th	Crazy Paving	Charles Payne	6-1	40.57	5
5th	Pierrot	Ronnie Melville	3-1	40.73	6
6th	Money Trebles	Bob Burls	66-1	40.85	4

Cesarewitch, West Ham (9 Oct, 600y, £1,000)
Pos	Name of Greyhound	Trainer	SP	Time	Trap
1st	Mile Bush Pride	Jack Harvey	2-7f	32.66	1
2nd	Just Fame	Tom Johnston Sr.	100-8	33.26	5
3rd	Dunmore Rocco	Dennis Hannafin	6-1	33.46	4
4th	De Luxe	W Taylor	100-8	33.58	2
5th	Princess Jester	Jack Harvey	100-6	33.62	6
6th	Pierrot	Ronnie Melville	50-1	33.68	3
