= Rushton Mac =

Racing greyhound

- Sire: Rushton News
- Dam: Rushton Panda
- Sex: Dog
- Whelped: June 1952
- Color: Black and white
- Owner: Frank Johnson & Mary Johnson
- Trainer: Frank Johnson

Record
- English Greyhound Derby; Scottish Greyhound Derby; Welsh Greyhound Derby; Pall Mall Stakes; Select Stakes; Northern Flat x 2 Edinburgh Cup x 2 St Mungo Cup

Awards
- Derby champion

Other awards
- Greyhound of the Year

Rushton Mac was a racing greyhound during the 1950s. He won the 1955 English Greyhound Derby and was the 1955 Greyhound of the Year.

== Early life ==
He was whelped in June 1952 and the litter included a greyhound called Rushton Sport. His sire was Rushton News, owned and trained by Frank Johnson and Johnson with his wife Mary also owned the new litter. The litter were trained out of Boothouse Farm, on The Hall Lane, in Rushton, Cheshire.

== Racing career ==
=== 1953 ===
The pair soon made their mark as puppies when both reached the Yorkshire Puppy Derby final at Leeds on 7 November.

=== 1954 ===
Rushton Mac won the St Mungo Cup at Carntyne Stadium before winning the Northumberland Stakes and then heading for an attempt at the Scottish Greyhound Derby along with his brother Rushton Spot. The pair reached the final and on 9 October, where Mac defeated Spot as they secured the first two places in the competition.

The pair then reached the Midland Flat, Grand Prix and Olympic finals (all won by Rushton Spot). Rushton Mac made amends for three defeats by his brother by winning the Edinburgh Cup, Northern Flat, Select Stakes and Pall Mall Stakes to complete a remarkable year. The only negative during the year was a doping incident at White City, when during the Challenge Stakes the pair ran unusually badly and it transpired that they had been given a barbiturate. Johnson offered a reward for information leading to the arrest of the guilty parties.

=== 1955 ===
Rushton Mac became the leading greyhound in the country during 1955 after winning the 1955 English Greyhound Derby.

In addition to the English Derby success he won a second Edinburgh Cup and Northern Flat and reached the finals of the Grand Prix at Walthamstow Stadium and Laurels at Wimbledon Stadium. He also won the Welsh Greyhound Derby but was denied a chance to win the Triple Crown after the Scottish Greyhound Derby was cancelled. He would have been only the second greyhound to have won the Triple Crown after Trev's Perfection. He did however hold all three Derby titles but not in the same year because he had won the Scottish Derby in 1954.

=== 1956 ===
He retired in 1956 after an unsuccessful attempt to defend his Derby title where he cramped during the opening round. During his career he had earned over £8,000 in prize money, had produced a winning sequence of 14 races at one stage and set new track records at Brough Park, Arms Park, Wolverhampton and Powderhall.

== Pedigree ==
Tanist
Tanimon
Princess Mona
Rushton News
Turk
Fly Joan
Clarendon Bess
Rushton Mac
Dee Rock
Swinging Light
Beaut
Rushton Panda
Rotten Row
Hazy Rhyl
July Record
