= Northern Flat =

Greyhound racing competition

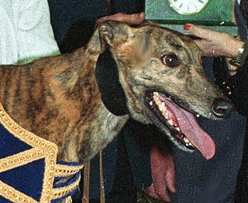
- Sullane Castle, winner in 1992
- Class: Category 1
- Location: Newcastle Stadium
- Inaugurated: 1927
- Sponsor: Time Greyhound Nutrition

Race information
- Distance: 480 metres
- Surface: Sand
- Purse: £12,500 (winner)

The Northern Flat is a greyhound racing competition held annually at Newcastle Stadium. The event was switched to Newcastle in 2021 following the closure of Belle Vue Stadium where it had been held from 1927 until 2018.

It was inaugurated in 1927 making it one of the oldest competitions in the racing calendar. The 1971 edition was an eight dog competition, the only time a major competition featured eight runners.

== Sponsors ==
- 1989–1989 (David P.Yates)
- 1990–1991 (John Smith's Brewery)
- 1994–1994 (Demmy Racing)
- 1999–2009 (Ben Holmes Bookmakers)
- 2011–2015 (Belle Vue Owners Forum)
- 2016–2018 (BAPP Group of Companies)
- 2021–2023 (Arena Racing Company)
- 2024-present (Time Greyhound Nutrition)

== Venue & distances ==
- 1927–1971 (Belle Vue, 500 yards)
- 1975–1998 (Belle Vue, 460 metres)
- 1999–2004 (Belle Vue, 465 metres)
- 2005–2018 (Belle Vue, 470 metres)
- 2021–present (Newcastle, 480 metres)

== Past winners ==
Year	Winner	Breeding	Trainer	Time (sec)	SP	notes/ref
1927	Great Chum	Woon - Chronic Cough	Jack Buck (Belle Vue)	29.60	11/8f	
1928	Mutable	Latto - Muffler	Eddie Wright (Belle Vue)	29.08	5/2f	
1929	Mutable	Latto - Muffler	Eddie Wright (Belle Vue)	29.34		
1930	Doumergue	Dago - Beaded Jean	Harry Woolner (White City - London)	29.17		
1931	Ross Regatta	Red Robin - Kaiserin	Reg Bosley (Private)	29.14		
1932	Wild Woolley	Hautley - Wild Witch	Jimmy Campbell (Belle Vue)	28.49		World & Track record
1933	Deemster's Mike	Deemster - Perdita	Fred Livesly (Bradford)	29.08	2/1jf	
1934	Kumm On Steve	Halmirah - Barbara Joan	Albert Jonas (White City - London)	29.42		
1935	Perendar	Rathwire - Ashbournes Joy	Fred Livesly (Bradford)	29.00		
1936	First Nobleman	Generous Nobleman - Ballinard Vue	Ronnie Melville (Newcastle)	29.16		
1937	Demotic Mack	Beef Cutlet - Kaiti Hill	Charles Cross (Clapton)	28.66	7/1	
1938	Italian Primer	Danielli - A.B.C.	Thomas Callighan (Salford)	28.92	8/15f	
1939	Sporting Offer	Silver Seal - Live Wiring	Austin Hiscock (Belle Vue)	28.74	1/3f	
1946	Dante II	Well Squared - Olives Idol	Wilf France (Harringay)	28.35	3/1	
1947	Tonycus	Manhattan Midnight - Dashing B.	Leslie Reynolds (Wembley)	28.09	4/7f	
1948	Clan Cameron	G.R Admiral - Noramac	W McLean (Powderhall)	28.68	100/8	
1949	Bahattan Marquis	Manhattan Midnight - Behattan	Bob Burls (Wembley)	28.37	5/2	
1950	Loyal Accomplice	Mad Tanist - Belle O'Harlem	Tom Paddy Reilly (Walthamstow)	28.10	6/4f	
1951	Rushton Smutty	Mad Tanist - Summer Frock	Frank Johnson (Private)	27.95	4/6f	
1952	Ballylanigan Tanist	Mad Tanist - Fly Dancer	Leslie Reynolds (Wembley)	27.82	2/1	
1953	Baytown Caddie	Bah's Choice - Baytown Blossom	Jack Harvey (Wembley)	28.20	11/4	
1954	Rushton Mac	Rushton News - Rushton Panda	Frank Johnson (Private)	28.12	6/1	
1955	Rushton Mac	Rushton News - Rushton Panda	Frank Johnson (Private)	27.82	4/11f	
1956	Duke Of Alva	Ballymac Ball - Marchioness Minnie	Frank Baldwin (Perry Barr)	28.68	20/1	dead-heat
1956	Wish Me Luck	Marsh Harrier - Chaser	Jack Brennan (Owlerton)	28.68	10/1	dead-heat
1957	Brooklands Hunter	Fly Prince - Brooklands Rose	H Harding (Private)	28.91	7/2	
1958	Just Fame	Colebreene Bell - More Fame	Tom Johnston Sr. (Carntyne)	28.56	8/11f	
1959	Low Pressure	Hi There - Belle Of Cassagh	Pam Heasman (Private)	28.09	8/13f	
1960	Just Fame	Colebreene Bell - More Fame	Tom Johnston Sr. (Carntyne)	28.37	6/1	
1961	Spider Hill	Forever Cloone - She Can Can	Joe Pickering (White City - London)	28.22	11/4	
1962	Faithful Charlie	Glittering Look - Lady Artic	Jim Irving (Private)	28.32	9/4	
1963	Super Car	Glittering Coin - Tansys Daughter	Norman Oliver (Brough Park)	27.95	12/1	
1964	We'll See	Knock Hill Chieftain - Bunnykins	Joe Pickering (White City - London)	28.11	4/1	
1965	Clonmannon Flash	Prairie Flash - Dainty Sister	Jim Hookway (Owlerton)	27.98	1/2f	
1966	Lazy Tim	Clonalvy Pride - You Little Daisy	Frank Baldwin (Perry Barr)	28.08	4/1	
1967	Own Luck	Careless Look - Miss Kruger	Joe Pickering (White City - London)	28.12	6/1	
1968	Limits Crackers	Odd Venture - Pats Regret	Coin McNally (Perry Barr)	28.09	11/10f	
1969	Infatuated	Prairie Flash - Clomoney Grand	Jim Irving (Private)	28.23	7/4f	
1970	The Other Green	Prairie Flash - The Other Flash	Jim Irving (Private)	27.66	1/3f	
1971	Knockmant Pride	Always Proud - Bonfire Grand	Bill Adams (White City - Manchester)	28.12	7/1	
1972 to 1974 not held
1975	Milebush Heron	Infatuated - Kellys For Cash	Bill Adams (Belle Vue)	28.14	1/1f	
1976	Detties Joy	Wafer Thin - Silver Torch	Geoff De Mulder (Hall Green)	27.91	7/4jf	
1977	Colonel Pearloma	Lively Band - Certral	John Coleman (Wembley)	27.52	7/1	
1978	Dale Lad	Lively Band - Kerry Pal	Geoff De Mulder (Hall Green)	27.56	4/7f	
1979	Ella's Sound	Monalee Champion - Current Flash	Frank Baldwin (Perry Barr)	27.45	6/1	
1980	Jon Barrie	Clashing - Famous Heart	Ray Andrews (Leeds)	27.85	11/4	
1981	Thanks Kev	Ahaveen Spitfire - Slide Over Baby	Frank Melville (Harringay)	27.67	11/8f	
1982	Oakfield Tracey	Westmead Power - Pride Of Aston	Rita Hayward (Perry Barr)	27.40	8/1	
1983	Slender Boy	Minnesota Mark - The Tunnel	Ken Reynolds (Cradley Heath)	27.80	7/1	
1984	Precious Prince	Fred Flinstone - Minnesota Oaks	Harry Crapper (Sheffield)	27.99	5/2	Track record
1985	Ebony Fox	Ballyderg Fox - Pile It High	Sam Salvin (Sheffield)	28.23	9/4f	
1986	Fearless Action	Ron Hardy - Sarahs Bunny	Geoff De Mulder (Oxford)	28.04	2/7f	
1987	Kingsmeadow King	Lauries Panther - Millies Midget	Dawn Milligan (Brough Park)	28.48	5/2f	
1988	Pond Hurricane	Lindas Champion - Soda Pop II	Harry Williams (Brough Park)	28.30	2/5f	
1989	Barnacuiga Lass	Dads Bank - Lady Rossmore	Geoff De Mulder (Norton Canes)	28.26	4/7f	
1990	Social Circle	Nelsons Dasher - Gorgeous	Linda Mullins (Romford)	28.05	2/1jf	
1991	Aylesbury Duck	Whisper Wishes - Judys First	David Budd (Peterborough)	28.14	2/1f	
1992	Sullane Castle	Tapwatcher - Airhill Foam	Nigel Saunders (Belle Vue)	28.03	11/8f	
1993	Toms Lodge	Druids Lodge - Grannys Black	Norman Johnson (Norton Canes)	27.59	8/13f	
1994	Gold Doon	Top Flash - Doon Duchess	Eddie Palmer (Sunderland)	28.02	6/1	
1995	Countrywide Cub	SatharnBeo - Free Fancy	John Coleman (Walthamstow)	28.66	6/4f	
1996	Rainstorm	Murlens Slippy - Westmead Bubble	Geoff De Mulder (Hall Green)	28.10	7/1	
1997	Brannigans Gig	Just Right Kyle - Castlelyons Link	Charlie Lister (Nottingham)	28.00	7-/1	
1998	Ratsatory	Vintage Prince - Sunset Blonde	Pat Ryan (Private)	28.09	5/2	
1999	Killaree George	Billy George - Toffee Money	Dave Hopper (Sheffield)	28.43	8/1	
2000	El Dante	Airmount Coal - Jubilee Joy	Linda Mullins (Walthamstow)	28.00	8/1	
2001	Carhumore Cross	He Knows - Laurdella Risk	Nick Savva (Private)	27.65	4/1	
2002	Cool Scenario	Spiral Nikita - Bangor Jane	Barrie Draper (Sheffield)	28.15	5/2cf	
2003	One Yard	Larkhill Jo - Gold Commentary	Andy Johnson (Private)	27.74	4/7f	
2004	Tarn Bay Flash	Larkhill Jo - Tarn Bay Ace	June McCombe (Belle Vue)	27.74	7/1	
2005	Phone for Who	Frisby Flashing - Suir Trio	Graham Hutt (Private)	27.75	3/1	
2006	Giddy Kipper	Larkhill Jo - Harsu Heather	June McCombe (Belle Vue)	27.70	25/1	
2007	Ballymac Charley	Daves Mentor - Ballymac Bargain	Charlie Lister (Private)	27.70	5/4f	
2008	Droopys Sheehy	Droopys Cahill - Droopys Millie	Elaine Parker (Sheffield)	27.79	7/4f	
2009	Anhid Bertie	Droopys Vieri-AnhidReta	Martin Cutler (Belle Vue)	27.61	4/1	
2010	Sundance Kid	World Class – Droopys Kara	Otto Kueres (Belle Vue)	28.19	4/1	
2011	Mountjoy Rock	Black Shaw – Noelles Amarillo	Elaine Parker (Sheffield)	27.37	4/6f	
2012	Alien Planet	Droopys Scolari-Betfowl	Stuart Mason (Private)	27.50	4/6f	
2013	Gurrane Boy	Black Shaw – Hawthorn Lily	John Walton (Belle Vue)	28.04	5/1	
2014	Bush Standard	Droopys Vieri – Lady Bluebell	Pat Rosney (Perry Barr)	27.98	3/1	
2015	Graigues Diva	Barefoot Bolt – Graigues Haze	Pat Rosney (Private)	27.70	7/2	
2016	Ballymac Galtee	Ballymac Vic – Galtee Ellie	Brian Stuart (Private)	27.75	4/1	
2017	Dropzone	Sh Avatar – Bonus	Elaine Parker (Sheffield)	28.10	6/4f	
2018	Fernhill Rex	Iso Octane – Fernhill Jess	Lee Field (Doncaster)	27.56	5/2	
2019 to 2020 not held
2021	Pacemaker Ted	Laughil Blake – Droopys Harbour	Tom Heilbron (Newcastle)	28.37	9/4f	
2022	Jaguar Macie	Droopys Jet – Droopys Breeze	Graham Rankin (Monmore)	28.27	10/11f	
2023	Brookside Richie	Droopys Sydney – Droopys Greatest	James Fenwick (Newcastle)	28.15	8/15f	
2024	Wicky Ned	Droopys Sydney – Ballycowen Lucy	James Fenwick (Newcastle)	28.81	7/4f	
2025	Naochra	Pestana – Lemon Kerrie	John Flaherty (Private)	28.66	9/2	
