= Stan Biss =

British greyhound racing professional trainer

Personal information
- Born: January 29, 1892 Waltham Abbey, England
- Died: March 9, 1952 (aged 60) Epping, Essex, England
- Occupation: Greyhound trainer

Sport
- Sport: Greyhound racing

Achievements and titles
- National finals: Derby wins: Scottish Derby (1930); Welsh Derby (1948); Classic/Feature wins: Cesarewitch (1948); Laurels (1947); Oaks (1930, 1932, 1933, 1937, 1946, 1947, 1948); Scurry Gold Cup (1947, 1948); Gold Collar (1948, 1949); Grand National (1937)

James "Stan" Stanley Biss (29 January 1892 – 9 March 1952) was a leading English greyhound trainer. He was a seven times winner of the Oaks in addition to winning the Scottish Greyhound Derby and Welsh Greyhound Derby.

== Early life ==
Biss spent his childhood living at the Queens Head public house in Waltham Abbey before becoming an Assurance Agent. In 1917 he joined the Navy and Royal Air Force as a Corporal mechanic. He married Agnes Oyler in 1923.

== Racing career ==
Biss was one of the original trainers at Wimbledon Stadium when the stadium opened in 1928 during the pioneer years of oval racing. In 1929 Biss trained out of Burhill Kennels and was in charge of some of the leading greyhounds in the country which included Bradshaw Fold and Queen of the Suir. He also helped fellow Burhill trainer Sidney Orton and the Kempton family acquire the legendary Mick The Miller.

During 1930 he joined West Ham Stadium, the same year that Bradshaw Fold finished second to Mick The Miller in the 1930 English Greyhound Derby final. One month later, in July he trained Captured Half when winning the Scottish Derby and Faithful Kitty claimed the Oaks in August. His kennels suffered a major fire in 1931 which killed three greyhounds including a leading runner called Gone For Sure.

Biss was regarded as one of the leading trainers in the country and continued to train major race winners, including Queen of the Suir (Oaks 1932 and 1933), Flying Wedge (Grand National 1937) and Brave Queen (Oaks 1937). Lutwyche also reached the 1933 English Greyhound Derby final. In 1939 Biss fell afoul of the racing authorities receiving a suspension and he left West Ham.

With the outbreak of World War II racing in London became fractured, Biss concentrated on his business of poultry farming on his Waltham Cross Farm but did take out a private trainers licence after being reinstated. After the war Biss joined Clapton Stadium and in 1946 steered Celtic Chief through to the Derby final, the same year in which Dumbles Maid won a fifth Oaks for Biss.

In 1947 Rimmells Black won the Scurry Gold Cup and Laurels, Rio Cepretta won the Oaks and Patsys Record reached the Derby final. A fire broke at Waltham Cross Farm that destroyed a building and a mushroom crop. The following year a Local Interprize ran second in the 1948 Derby and Biss won five classic races the same year, a notable year as a trainer.

== Retirement and death ==
Biss retired in 1951 handing the Denver Lodge kennels to head girl Pam Heasman, he died in 1952 after suffering a stroke.
