= 1959 English Greyhound Derby =

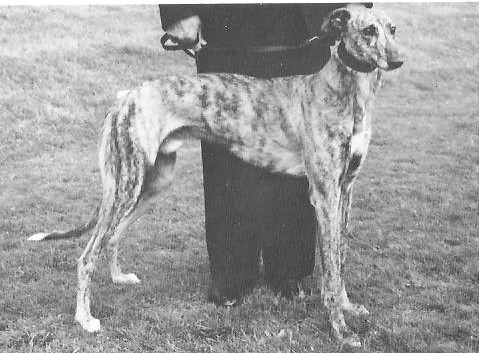
- Mile Bush Pride
- Location: White City Stadium
- Start date: 13 June
- End date: 27 June
- Total prize money: £1,500 (winner)

The 1959 Greyhound Derby took place during June with the final being held on 27 June 1959 at White City Stadium. The winner was Mile Bush Pride and the winning owner Noel Purvis received £1,500.

== Final result ==
At White City (over 525 yards):

Position	Name of Greyhound	Breeding	Trap	SP	Time	Trainer
1st	Mile Bush Pride	The Grand Champion - Witching Dancer	4	1-1f	28.76	Jack Harvey (Wembley)
2nd	Snub Nose	Racing Snob - Black Toes	6	5-1	28.79	Jimmy Purnell (Private)
3rd	Crazy Parachute	Hi There - Mad Prospect	1	100-30	28.81	Bob Burls (Wembley)
4th	Coolkill Racket	Coolkill Nigger - Tennis Racket	3	100-7	29.37	Reg Holland (Private)
5th	Bryans Hope	Disabled Leader - Only Atomic	2	10-1	29.57	Leslie Reynolds (Wembley)
6th	Dancing Sheik	Imperial Dancer - Delias Green	5	33-1	00.00	Ted Brennan (Sheffield)

=== Distances ===
Neck, Head, 7, 2½, Dis (lengths)
The distances between the greyhounds are in finishing order and shown in lengths. From 1950 one length was equal to 0.08 of one second.

== Competition Report ==
140 entries at £5 were received for the first acceptance stage of the Derby. The ante-post favourite Mile Bush Pride failed to win his first round heat for the second consecutive year. However, despite encountering crowding he safely made it through to round two; the race was won by Irish entry Sir Frederick. Three greyhounds broke 29 seconds in the first set of qualifiers; they were Crazy Parachute, Dunmore Rocco and the previous year's finalist Gentle Touch.

The second round resulted in a fast win for Mile Bush Pride (28.57), a time that could not be matched by any greyhound left in the competition. The Irish hope Sir Frederick was knocked over ending his hopes and he would have to settle for finishing second behind Dunmore Rocco in the Consolation Stakes on final night.

Mile Bush Pride followed his second round win with a seven length semi-final victory. The second semi-final was more competitive and ended with a first dead heat for a semi-final in Derby history when Snub Rose ran on well to catch leader Crazy Parachute.

In the final Snub Nose made a good start from the traps with Dancing Sheik just behind. Early pace by Crazy Parachute saw him pass Dancing Sheik and then Snub Nose by the second bend. By the third bend Mile Bush Pride who had been last out of the traps had caught Dancing Sheik to take up third position. Crazy Parachute was vying with Snub Nose around the last bend and home straight when Crazy Parachute left a gap on the rails. This was enough for Mile Bush Pride to take advantage and run on strongly to win the race by a neck.

== See also ==
1959 UK & Ireland Greyhound Racing Year
