= 1955 Irish Greyhound Derby =

- Venue: Harold's Cross Stadium
- Location: Dublin
- End date: 12 August
- Total prize money: £500 (winner)

The 1955 Irish Greyhound Derby took place during July and August with the final being held at Harold's Cross Stadium in Dublin on 12 August 1955.

The winner Spanish Battleship won £500 and was trained by Tom Lynch and owned by Tim 'Chubb' O'Connor. Spanish Battleship won a historic third consecutive title, a feat that had not been achieved before or since.

== Final result ==
At Harold's Cross, 12 August (over 525 yards):

Position	Name of Greyhound	Breeding	Trap	SP	Time	Trainer
1st	Spanish Battleship	Spanish Chestnut – Ballyseedy Memory	1	5-4f	29.53	Tom Lynch
2nd	Crostys Bell	The Grand Champion – Crosty Lady	6	7-4	29.85	Jerry Lyne
3rd	Dancing Jester	Fairy Jester – Castleview Dancer	5	10-1	30.01	Tom Lynch
4th	Sailaway Sailor	unknown	4	100-7	30.09	
5th	Mile Bush Champion	unknown	2	8-1		
6th	Claremont John	Derrycrussan – Claremont Girl	3	100-8		James Campbell

=== Distances ===
4, 2, 1 (lengths)

== Competition Report ==
Spanish Battleship was a national icon by the time he lined for an attempt to win a third title. He suffered a surprise first round defeat when he was caught before the line by Crostys Bell but he still qualified for the next round by virtue of finishing second. Trainer Tom Lynch had other entries in the competition and two dead heated in the first round, they were Imperial Toast and Dancing Jester. Makra Bibs who had defeated Spanish Battleship in the Tostal Cup earlier in the year was the fastest heat winner in 29.68. Due to there being only 36 greyhounds in the event this year there was a rest before the semi-finals got underway and Lynch gave Spanish Battleship a trial. In the semi-finals Spanish Battleship returned to winning form by beating Mile Bush Champion by three lengths but Makra Bibs failed to make the final. A very fast time of 29.53 from Crostys Bell was good enough to take the second semi-final from Sailaway Sailor and Dancing Jester completed the round after he beat Claremont John in the third heat.

Harold's Cross stadium was overwhelmed by crowds attempting to see Spanish Battleship and they backed him into favourite at 5-4 with Crostys Bell drifting in the market at 7-4. Spanish Battleship was first away from the traps again and stretched to a three length victory from Crostys Bell to cement his place into the record books.

== See also ==
- 1955 UK & Ireland Greyhound Racing Year
