= 1956 UK & Ireland Greyhound Racing Year =

The 1956 UK & Ireland Greyhound Racing Year was the 31st year of greyhound racing in the United Kingdom and the 30th year of greyhound racing in Ireland.

== Roll of honour ==
Major Winners
Award	Name of Winner
1956 English Greyhound Derby	Dunmore King
1956 Irish Greyhound Derby	Keep Moving
1956 Scottish Greyhound Derby	Quick Surprise
1956 Welsh Greyhound Derby	Not held

== Summary ==
Attendances and Totalisator turnover had stabilised, with the latter resulting in a turnover of around £55 million. The Churches' Council on gambling quoted a figure of £119 million but that figure was for total gambling spend within the industry. One problem for the industry was that the biggest names Spanish Battleship, Rushton Mac and Pauls Fun had all retired leaving the search for a new star.

== Competitions ==
No single greyhound was able to secure more than one classic race success, the main Derby titles went to Dunmore King and Keep Moving. The 1956 English Greyhound Derby runner-up Duet Leader won the Laurels at Wimbledon Stadium and the Derby final third Gulf of Darien, reached the St Leger final at Wembley and the Cesarewitch at West Ham Stadium. The Welsh Greyhound Derby failed to take place again.

Shipping magnate Noel Purvis, who owned two of the 1956 Derby finalists gained consolation when Belingas Customer won the Scurry Gold Cup over 400 yards, a distance better suited to the greyhound than the Derby distance.

== Ireland ==
The main interest in Ireland was in regard to Prince of Bermuda, the brindle dog owned by Ned Buckley was considered to be the fastest greyhound in training at the time but had disappointed in the 1956 Irish Greyhound Derby final. A match race was organised between Prince of Bermuda, Northern King and Duet Leader at White City which ended with the Irish hound coming out best, he was subsequently retired to stud.

== Principal UK races ==
Grand National, White City (May 5 525y h, £300)
Pos	Name of Greyhound	Trainer	SP	Time	Trap
1st	Blue Sand	Ken Appleton	15-8f	29.70	4
2nd	Merry April	Dennis Hannafin	4-1	30.34	3
3rd	Jumping Pole	Reg Bosley	11-4	30.62	5
4th	Vintners Cup	Jim Syder Jr.	6-1	30.66	6
5th	Tanyard Tulip	Jack Harvey	6-1	30.72	1
6th	Vented Cask		33-1	30.96	2

Gold Collar, Catford (May 26, 440y, £500)
Pos	Name of Greyhound	Trainer	SP	Time	Trap
1st	Ponsford	Noreen Collin	10-1	25.69	1
2nd	Rusty Chain	Ron Chamberlain	8-11f	25.72	2
3rd	Howardstown Tonic	Hackney	8-1	25.75	5
4th	Tax Diablo	Jim Syder Jr.	6-1	25.78	3
5th	Record Tass		7-2	26.10	4
N/R	No Pay				

Scottish Greyhound Derby, Carntyne (Jul 14, 525y, £500)
Pos	Name of Greyhound	Trainer	SP	Time	Trap
1st	Quick Surprise	Pat Mullins	1-1f	29.44	5
2nd	Fodda Champion	Harry Bidwell	3-1	29.50	3
3rd	Rushton Spot	Frank Johnson	3-1	29.58	2
4th	The Burr		7-1	29.62	1
5th	Grange Son		12-1	29.66	4

Scurry Gold Cup, Clapton (Jul 28, 400y £600)
Pos	Name of Greyhound	Trainer	SP	Time	Trap
1st	Belingas Customer	Ronnie Melville	10-3	22.82	4
2nd	Claremount John	Paddy McEvoy	5-2f	23.02	2
3rd	Cree Starlight		6-1	23.16	1
4th	Crostys Bell	Paddy McEvoy	10-3	23.17	3
5th	Maghernagaw Flier	Sidney Orton	8-1	23.31	5
6th	Westcourt Freedom		6-1	23.47	6

Laurels, Wimbledon (Aug 24, 500y, £1,000)
Pos	Name of Greyhound	Trainer	SP	Time	Trap
1st	Duet Leader	Tom Reilly	1-1f	28.13	1
2nd	Cleos Gossip	Bob Burls	5-2	28.19	6
3rd	Cool Magourna		10-1	28.33	3
4th	Claremount John	Paddy McEvoy	5-1	28.51	5
5th	Rosevale Paddy		7-1	28.61	2
6th	Secret Armour	Tom Reilly	10-1	28.75	4

St Leger, Wembley (Sep 10, 700y, £1,000)
Pos	Name of Greyhound	Trainer	SP	Time	Trap
1st	Jakfigaralt	Joe Booth	7-2	40.50	6
2nd	Gulf of Darien	Jack Harvey	5-4f	40.68	4
3rd	Black Envoy	Joe Booth	3-1	40.70	3
4th	Whats Yat	Leslie Reynolds	8-1	40.92	1
5th	Grandbally Shaun	Jack Harvey	10-1	41.40	5
6th	Paracelsus	Jack Harvey	25-1	41.41	2

The Grand Prix Walthamstow (Sep 25, 525y, £500)
Pos	Name of Greyhound	Trainer	SP	Time	Trap
1st	Land Of Song	Bob Burls	7-2	29.70	3
2nd	Parkland Hero	Mrs K.Roberts	11-10f	29.82	1
3rd	Jan		7-1	29.88	4
4th	Garbagh Bin	Bob Burls	5-2	30.20	2
N/R	Go Doggie Go	Jack Toseland			
N/R	Comin Champion	Jim Syder Jr.			

Oaks, White City (Sep 29, 525y, £500)
Pos	Name of Greyhound	Trainer	SP	Time	Trap
1st	First But Last	Jack Harvey	2-7f	29.08	6
2nd	Dark Rose	Paddy Fortune	9-2	29.52	1
3rd	Magourna Belle		100-7	29.53	4
4th	Rambling Cockeye		25-1	29.63	5
5th	Speir Bhean	Jack Harvey	20-1	29.75	3
6th	Meanus Ann		66-1	30.55	2

Cesarewitch, West Ham (Oct 12, 600y, £1.000)
Pos	Name of Greyhound	Trainer	SP	Time	Trap
1st	Coming Champion	Jim Syder Jr.	9-2	33.02	4
2nd	Gallant and Gay	Joe Pickering	33-1	33.18	5
3rd	Gulf of Darien	Jack Harvey	9-4	33.22	3
4th	Northern King	Jack Harvey	7-4f	33.38	6
5th	Jakfigaralt	Joe Booth	9-2	33.42	2
6th	Kilcaskin Kilian		25-1	33.48	1
