= 1946 English Greyhound Derby =

British greyhound race

- Location: White City Stadium
- End date: 29 June
- Total prize money: £1,000 (winner)

The 1946 Greyhound Derby took place during June with the final being held on 29 June 1946 at White City Stadium. The winner Mondays News received a first prize of £1,000.

Over 50,000 attended the first round heats and £1 million changed hands in the final alone.

== Final result ==
At White City (over 525 yards):

Position	Name of Greyhound	Breeding	Trap	SP	Time	Trainer
1st	Mondays News	Orlucks Best - Monday Next	3	5-1	29.24	Fred Farey (Private)
2nd	Lilac Luck	Printer - Wilton Sandills	2	2-1f	29.80	R Jones (Doncaster)
3rd	Plucky Hero	Castledown Lad - Lucky Rattle	6	6-1	29.92	Wilf France (Harringay)
4th	Celtic Chief	Well Squared - Second Row	1	9-2	29.98	Stan Biss (Clapton)
5th	Dante II	Well Squared - Olives Idol	4	10-1	30.28	Wilf France (Harringay)
6th	Shannon Shore	Well Squared - Second Row	5	9-2	30.52	Leslie Reynolds (Wembley)

=== Distances ===
7, 1½, ¾, 5, 3 (lengths)
The distances between the greyhounds are in finishing order and shown in lengths. From 1927-1950 one length was equal to 0.06 of one second but race times are shown as 0.08 as per modern day calculations.

== Review ==
The eight first round heats were watched by 50,000 and featured all of the leading names. The ante-post favourite Bah's Choice was an English-bred greyhound trained by Bob Burls, he won the Wood Lane Stakes at White City undefeated recording 29.47sec, 29.50sec, and 29.48sec. Just two days later, he clocked 29.04sec to set a new 525 yards world and track record at Wembley defeating Magic Bohemian by six lengths. On 6 June 1946, at White City in a Derby trial, he clocked a then astonishing 28.99sec to become the first dog in the world to break 29 seconds over the 525 yards. His campaign started badly because he finished second to Welsh Greyhound Derby champion Shaggy Lass.

Irish star Quare Times took a seven length victory in 29.22. He had finished second to Shaggy Lad in the 1945 Irish Puppy Derby. Then, in the second round of the National Puppy Cup at Clonmel, he clocked 29.75sec to set a new track record. In the final of the 1946 Easter Cup at Shelbourne Park, he was second to the bitch Astra, having previously beaten her in the second round by six lengths. Coming to England in May 1946 after his Easter Cup run, Quare Times was placed with Sidney Orton at Wimbledon Stadium for the Derby.

Mondays News was available at 200-1 for the Derby and was trained by Fred Farey, a private trainer at Shenfield, in Essex and owned by D.T. Stewart; he had lowered the long standing Southend Stadium track record, clocking 28.22sec for the 500 yards course and beat Bah's Choice in the 1946 May Stakes at Wembley. Farey had run a successful catering business before the war and had given it up to become a full time trainer in 1943.

Mott's Regret was the leading first round elimination going out in the final heat. In round two Quare Times clocked a new world record time of 28.95sec and Bahs Choice backed again to 4-6f was slow away but came from behind to win in 29.22. Irish Greyhound Derby champion Lilacs Luck also progressed into the semi-finals along with Celtic Chief a 1945 English Greyhound Derby finalist.

The first semi-final resulted in a win for Mondays News with Plucky Hero and Lilacs Luck claimed final places. The second semi-final paired both Quare Times (4-5) and Bahs Choice (5-2) and they encountered considerable crowding which left them behind the pace. Bah's Choice recovered well but it was too late because Pall Mall Stakes and Golden Crest champion Shannon Shore, Celtic Chief and Dante II had all passed the line.

The final was run under floodlights for the first time, Mondays News broke well moving to the rails from trap three and Lilacs Luck was challenging but moved wide at the first interfering with Dante II and Shannon Shore. Mondays News stretched his lead with Plucky Hero and Celtic Chief taking second and third place after missing the trouble. Lilacs Luck finished very strongly to claim second but was seven lengths behind the winner who recorded 29.24, the fastest ever time for a final. In the Derby Consolation Stakes, however, Quare Times won by four lengths from Bah's Choice in 28.82sec to improve on his own world record.

== See also ==
1946 UK & Ireland Greyhound Racing Year
