= Shebbertown Racecourse =

1922–1930 racing course in England

- Location: Abbotsham, Devon
- Coordinates: 51°01′27″N 4°15′32″W
- Opened: 27 September 1922
- Closed: April 1930

Shebbertown or Abbotsham Racecourse was a horse racing, greyhound racing and whippet racing course near Abbotsham, Devon; an area in South West England.

== Origins ==
The course was built by Skidmore Ashby on his Abbotsham Court property in 1922. The course ran along the valley of Abbotsham Court and Cornborough and was run under the rules of the Shebbertown Race Club.

== History ==
Horse racing started on 27 September 1922 but finished September 1925. Greyhound racing, whippet racing, gymkhana pony racing and motor cycle racing were all held at the venue at later dates.

The greyhound racing was independent (not affiliated to the National Greyhound Racing Club) and started on 1 September 1927.

== Closure ==
The greyhound racing continued into and throughout 1929 but the 66 acre course was put up for sale in April 1930.
