= Greenfield Stadium, Bradford =

Sports venue in Bradford, England

Greenfield Stadium
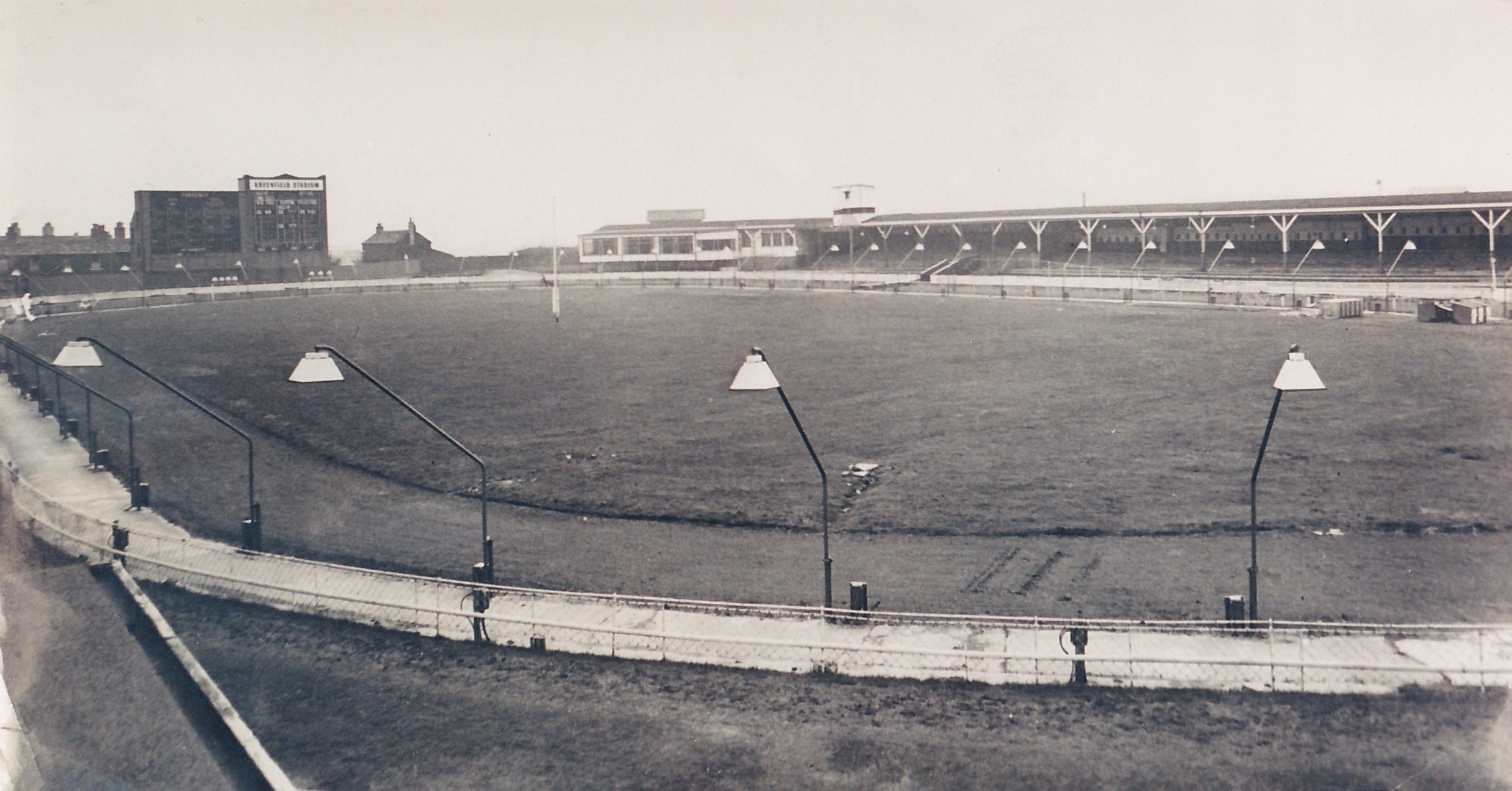
- Greenfield Stadium in Bradford c.1960
- Interactive map of Greenfield Stadium
- Former names: Greenfield Athletic Ground; Greenfield Autodrome; Yorkshire Trotting and Athletic Grounds
- Location: Bradford

Construction
- Opened: Before 1907
- Closed: 5 March 1969

Tenants
- Bradford Northern; Bradford Panthers; Greyhound racing

Greenfield Stadium, also known as Greenfield Athletic Ground, Greenfield Autodrome and the Yorkshire Trotting and Athletic Grounds was a sports venue in Bradford, West Yorkshire, England. The venue was the first and former home ground of Bradford Northern Rugby league Football Club, before later becoming a greyhound stadium and speedway track. It was situated adjacent to School Street, off Cutler Heights Lane in Dudley Hill, Bradford and in 1907, consisted of a six acre field enclosed by a pear-shaped athletic and trotting track.

== Sports ==
=== Rugby League ===
In 1907, the newly formed Bradford Northern rented the ground for £8 from Whitaker's Brewery, who also agreed to sponsor the club. It became Northern's first permanent home and the club set up its headquarters at the adjacent Greenfield Hotel. Bradford's first match there was against Huddersfield on 7 September 1907 and was watched by around 7,000 spectators. The club gained a significant scalp later that year when they beat the New Zealand touring side.

Northern spent a total of £302 on a grandstand, fencing and the pitch even though they only spent one season at Greenfield. They vacated the ground after a vote at their AGM in June 1908, whence they moved to Birch Lane and then onto their current home Odsal Stadium. With Northern's departure, the ground reverted to sole usage as a running and trotting track and by the 1920s was known as the Yorkshire Trotting and Athletic Grounds.

=== Greyhound Racing ===
==== Origins and Opening ====
In 1926 work began on the venue to convert it into a greyhound racing stadium, one of the first in the UK and it opened on 8 October 1927. The track was affiliated to the National Greyhound Racing Club.

By now the facilities were much more developed than they had been in early days. There was a main stand made up of covered terracing on the School Street side, opposite the starting gate. There was also covered terracing along the back straight on the Cutler Heights side. At one end was a huge tote board but no terracing and at the other end, a concourse with betting and a clubhouse overlooking the dog track.

==== History ====
During the first month of racing the city of Bradford suffered severe gales and on the 29 October 1927 the football team lost the roof of their enclosure and the greyhound track lost the roof from both stands. The stadium traded as Greenfield Greyhound Racing Association overseen by general manager J.C.Ridley. the two major stakeholders were the Electric Hare Company, Liverpool and the Greyhound Racing Association.

In 1932 trainer Jimmy Rimmer set a record of 504 winners in one year whilst attached to the track, Rimmer was famous as being the slipper at the Waterloo Cup for many years. One year later in 1934 Greenfield was represented by a greyhound called Deemsters Mike in the English Greyhound Derby final. The brindle dog trained by Fred Livesly also went on to win the Northern Flat.

The track was described as a well laid out course with a good run-in to the finish and suitable for all types of runners. There was an 'Outside Sumner' hare and race distances of 310, 500, 650 and 700 yards on a circuit with a 420-yard circumference. The stadium entrances sat alongside the Greenfield Hotel and the popular club stand, on the opposite side of the track was the stadium club stand where the finishing line was located. Behind this stand fifty race day kennels and a paddock provided the hounds housing. Even further behind these were the residential kennels. Between the first and second bends a third stand called the Padden Connel club brought the total spectator capacity to 7,000 patrons.

In 1952 the track reached the final of the national track championship sponsored by the News of the World only to lose out to Eastville Stadium 19–11.

=== Speedway ===
In 1961, a 320 yards (290 metres) speedway track was laid inside the dog track, and the city's speedway team, Bradford Panthers, relocated to Greenfield from Odsal Stadium. The first meeting was opened by famous speedway promoter Johnnie Hoskins. Success was short-lived, and the last meeting at Greenfield Stadium was a double-header against Sheffield and Leicester on Tuesday 9 October 1962. The Panthers folded soon after.

== Closure ==
The stadium was closed for business in March 1969 and sold for industrial warehousing. The last sporting event was a greyhound meeting on 5 March, attended by 4,790.

== Track records ==
| Distance yards | Greyhound | Time | Date | Notes |
|---|---|---|---|---|
| 310 | Castlewood Captain | 17.27 | 1946 | |
| 500 | Fine Parade | 28.34 | 1946 | |
| 500 | Fly Baby Fly | 28.20 | 10.06.1964 | |
| 500 | Faithful Hope | 28.20 | 13.10.1965 | |
| 650 | Well Schooled | 37.40 | 1946 | |
| 650 | Haverbrack Rona | 37.29 | 1950 | |
| 700 | Peartree Man | 40.90 | 1946 | |
| 700 | Siva Starlight | 40.26 | 13.06.1962 | |
| 310 H | Duoro | 18.93 | 1930 | |

== Bibliography ==
- Bamford, R.; Jarvis, J. (2001). Homes of British Speedway. The History Press. ISBN 0-7524-2210-3.
- Delaney, Trevor (1991). The Grounds Of Rugby League. Keighley: Trevor R. Delaney. ISBN 0-9509-9822-2.
