= Leicester (Aylestone Road) Greyhound Track =

Sports venue in the UK

Leicester Aylestone Road Greyhound Track
- Location: Aylestone Road, Leicester
- Coordinates: 52°37′10″N 1°08′21″W
- Opened: 1927
- Closed: 1929

Leicester Aylestone Road Greyhound Track was a greyhound racing stadium on Aylestone Road, Leicester.

== Origins ==
The track was constructed on the Agricultural Show Grounds, on the south side of the Aylestone Road County Cricket Ground which was used by Leicestershire County Cricket Club at the time.

== Opening ==
The opening night was on 24 September 1927.

== Closure ==
The racing was short-lived and only lasted until 1929 but was under the National Greyhound Racing Club banner at some stage.
