= Trev's Perfection =

British racing greyhound

- Sire: Trev's Despatch
- Dam: Friar Tuck
- Sex: Dog
- Whelped: April 1944
- Color: Dark Brindle and White
- Owner: Fred Trevillion
- Trainer: Fred Trevillion

Record
- English Greyhound Derby; Scottish Greyhound Derby; Welsh Greyhound Derby

Awards
- Triple Crown winner

Trev's Perfection was a racing greyhound from the 1940s. He is just one of three greyhounds along with Patricias Hope and Mile Bush Pride to win the Triple Crown which consisted of the English Greyhound Derby, Scottish Greyhound Derby and Welsh Greyhound Derby.

== Whelping and rearing ==
He was born in Cumberland with the name of Motts Regret in April 1944. By Trev's Dispatch out of Friar Tuck he was bred and reared by Mr H.G. Nunn.

== 1946 ==
The 1946 racing year saw him compete in the 1946 English Greyhound Derby without success. He was however a prolific open race winner and was put up for sale at Aldridges sales where he went unsold despite a bid of 1,250 guineas. Later that year he went down with distemper and pneumonia at the GRA Hook Estate and Kennels in Northaw and after a long convalescence recovered successfully.

== 1947 ==
In 1947, Motts Regret was bought by Fred Trevillion, a haulage contractor from Dartford, who was a National Greyhound Racing Club licensed greyhound trainer with a number of greyhounds which carried the Trev's prefix. He paid £900 to purchase Motts Regret and changed the dogs name to Trev's Perfection. The greyhound was kennelled with Trevillion in Sutton-at-Hone where security included a night watchman and a team of German Shepherd dogs.

Trev's Perfection won the Circuit competition at Walthamstow Stadium and later, on 7 June 1947 was successful in winning the Gold Collar title before heading for the Derby. The Gold Collar final field included Monday's News who had broken the track record in the semi-finals,

Before an attendance of 55,000 he won the 1947 English Greyhound Derby. The triple crown was achieved by virtue of winning the Scottish Greyhound Derby on 5 July and Welsh Greyhound Derby on 26 July. He finished the year as the leading prize money winner with £4,042, which constituted a new record at the time.

== 1948 ==
The 1948 racing year would see the end of his racing career. On 1 April 1948, Trevillion, his head kennel-man Arthur Hancock and Trev's Perfection left on the Queen Mary for the United States where the greyhound failed to make an impression. They returned to the United Kingdom and Trev's Perfection was retired to stud in 1948.

== Pedigree ==
Macoma
Silver Seal
Yatton Tiny
Trev's Despatch
Brutus
Lady Moonshine
Lady Christabelle
Trev's Perfection
Mutton Cutlet
Beef Cutlet
Burette
Friar Tuck
Hautley
Wild Winnie
Wild Witch
