= Mile Bush Pride =

British racing greyhound

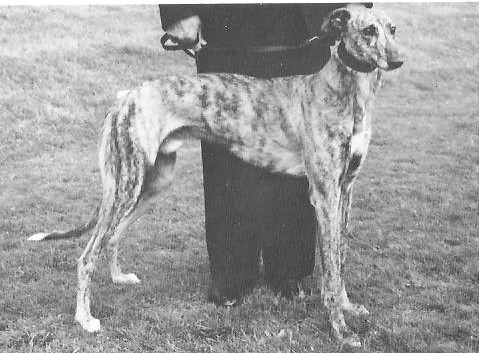
- Sire: The Grand Champion
- Dam: Witching Dancer
- Sex: Dog
- Whelped: August 1956
- Color: Brindle
- Owner: Noel Purvis
- Trainer: Jack Harvey

Record
- English Greyhound Derby; Scottish Greyhound Derby; Welsh Greyhound Derby; Cesarewitch; Pall Mall; Select Stakes x 2 Wembley Spring Cup x 2

Awards
- Triple Crown winner

Mile Bush Pride was a racing greyhound of the late 1950s and 1960. He is one of three greyhounds along with Patricias Hope and Trev's Perfection to win the Triple Crown which consisted of the English Greyhound Derby, Scottish Greyhound Derby and Welsh Greyhound Derby.

== Breeding ==
He was bred by Nora Johnston in Campile, County Wexford, and reared by Hannah Malone.

== Racing ==
=== 1958 ===
Mile Bush Pride had been bought for £2,500 for the 1958 English Greyhound Derby by Wembley trainer Jack Harvey for owner Noel Purvis, a shipping magnate. The brindle greyhound reached the final but finished in third place from a bad trap draw in a race considered to be one of the strongest in the history of the competition.

=== 1959 ===
In 1959 Mile Bush Pride won the triple crown, he was aimed at the 1959 English Greyhound Derby as the ante post favourite and duly won the event. He then secured the Scottish Greyhound Derby and Welsh Greyhound Derby.

In addition to the triple crown he won the Pall Mall and Select Stakes and Cesarewitch in 1959.

=== 1960 ===
In 1960 he qualified for a third successive Derby final during the 1960 English Greyhound Derby.

== Retirement ==
Mile Bush Pride was retired to stud in 1960 after the Derby and died in 1963. At the time he was regarded as the greatest greyhound since Mick the Miller.

== Pedigree ==
Tanist
Mad Tanist
Mad Darkie
The Grand Champion
Bella's Prince
Could Be Worse
Bomb Fire
Mile Bush Pride
Bah's Choice
Imperial Dancer
Imperial Girl
Witching Dancer
Manhattan Midnight
Witching Night
Top Class
