= White City Stadium =

Stadium in London, England, 1908 to 1985

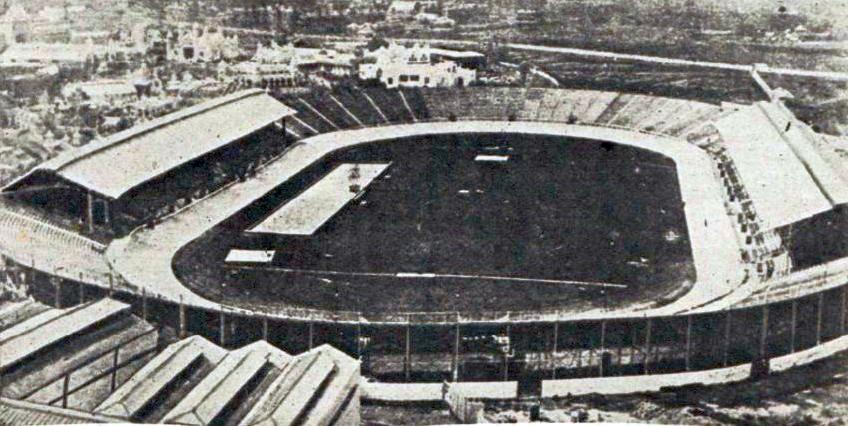
- The stadium during the 1908 Summer Olympics
- Interactive map of White City Stadium
- Location: White City, London, England
- Coordinates: 51.5136°N 0.2274°W
- Capacity: 93,000
- Surface: Grass

Construction
- Groundbreaking: 1907; 119 years ago
- Opened: 27 April 1908; 118 years ago
- Closed: 1984; 42 years ago
- Demolished: 1985; 41 years ago

Tenants
- Queens Park Rangers (1931–33, 1962–63); London Highfield (1933); White City Rebels (1976–78); Greyhound Racing Association (1926–84)

White City Stadium in London, England, was built for the 1908 Summer Olympics and demolished in 1985. It hosted the finish of the first modern marathon and swimming, speedway, boxing, show jumping, athletics and concerts. It hosted a match at the 1966 FIFA World Cup, was used for stock car racing in the early seventies when Spedeworth promoted racing on Friday nights, and was a venue for greyhound racing from 1927, hosting the English Greyhound Derby.

The venue closed in 1984, and the site is now occupied by White City Place.

== History ==
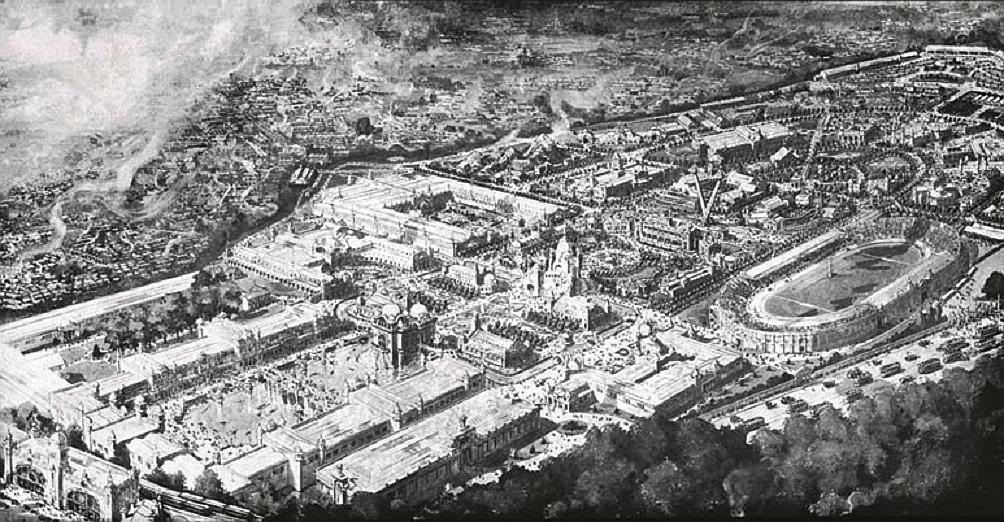
The 1908 Franco-British Exhibition site seen from the air. The White City Stadium is to the right of the view

Designed by the engineer J. J. Webster and completed in 10 months by George Wimpey, on part of the site of the Franco-British Exhibition, this stadium with a seating capacity of 68,000 was opened by King Edward VII on 27 April 1908 after the first stanchion had been placed in position by Ettie Grenfell, Baroness Desborough on 2 August 1907. The cost of construction was £60,000. Upon completion, the stadium had a running track 24 ft wide (7.3 m) and three laps to the mile (536 m); outside there was a 35-foot-wide (11 m), 660-yard (600 m) cycle track. The infield included a swimming and diving pool.

Many events of the 1908 Olympics were at the stadium itself whereas nowadays there are many arenas. The Olympic rugby union final between Australia and Great Britain was held in the stadium on 26 October 1908 and events such as archery and gymnastics took place at White City, while some others took place at Queens Club. Swimming was held at White City, in a 100 metres long pool dug in the infield.

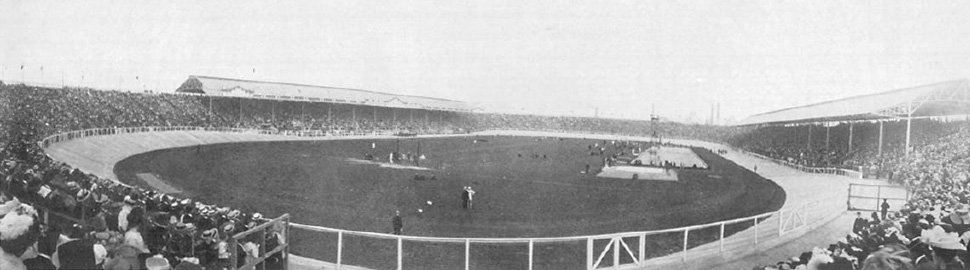
The White City Stadium during the 1908 Summer Olympics

The position of the finish line for the marathon in the 1908 Summer Olympics is commemorated by a marker in the plaza that now stands there. The distance of the modern marathon was fixed at these Games and calculated from the start of the race at Windsor Castle to a point in front of the royal box. The medal table for the 1908 Summer Olympics is also listed on a nearby wall.

The original running track continued in use until 1914. There were attempts to sell the stadium in 1922, but several athletes in the team for the 1924 Summer Olympics used it for training.

In 1926, the GRA (Greyhound Racing Association) took over the stadium and in 1927, the track was grassed over for greyhound racing. Speedway arrived the following year in 1928. The GRA built new covered terracing and a restaurant. From 1927 until its closure, it hosted weekly greyhound meetings and was considered the top greyhound track in Britain. It hosted the sport's premier event, the English Greyhound Derby, until 1984. Just before and after the Second World War, attendances were huge, a record 92,000 spectators attended the 1939 Derby final.

In 1931, a 440yd running track was installed for the Amateur Athletic Association Championships, held there from 1932 to 1970. Besides the AAA championships, major athletics events, including international matches, were held at the stadium. In 1954, in a match against Russia Christopher Chataway broke the world 5000m record running against Vladimir Kuts. The one mile world record was broken there by Derek Ibbotson in 1957. In 1934, the second British Empire Games and the fourth Women's World Games were held at the venue.

Also in 1931, Queens Park Rangers F.C. began the first of two spells playing at the stadium, until 1933 (the second spell was from 1962 to 1963). QPR eventually decided against a permanent move to White City and stayed at Loftus Road.

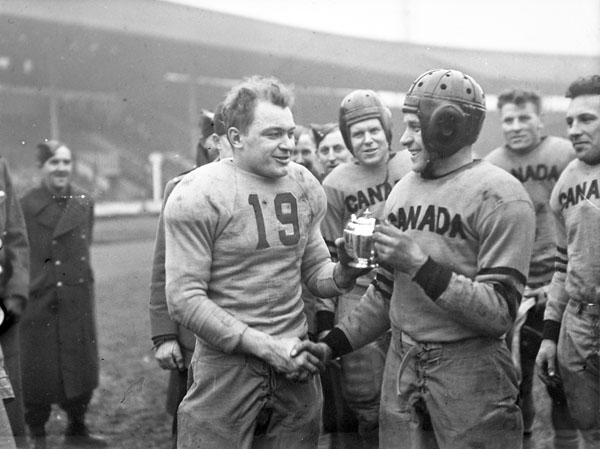
Team captains shake hands after a Canada-United States American football game at White City Stadium, 14 February 1944

Between 1932 and 1958, the stadium hosted major British boxing events, with attendances peaking as high as 90,000 for the second meeting between Len Harvey and Jack Petersen in 1934. The first major fight at the stadium was Len Harvey's unsuccessful challenge for the NBA Middleweight Championship versus Marcel Thil of France. Future heavyweight champion Primo Carnera suffered his only defeat on British soil when he lost to Canadian Larry Gains in May 1932. Other important fighters to appear at White City include Jock McAvoy, Don Cockell, Nino Valdez, Henry Cooper and Terry Downes.

In 1933, Wigan Highfield, a rugby league side, nearly became bankrupt. White City Company, owners of the stadium, decided to move the club to White City. Previously, only rugby union had been popular in southern England, professional rugby league being the preserve of northern towns and cities. Wigan Highfield became London Highfield with their debts paid. Their first try was scored by George "Porky" Davies, who went on to play for Liverpool Stanley and then St. Helens from 1938 to 1947. The White City Company lost money on the venture and decided not to continue with rugby league. London Highfield was the precursor to London Broncos, the leading rugby league club in London.

In 1966, the owners of Wembley Stadium refused to cancel regular greyhound racing meaning the match between Uruguay and France in the 1966 FIFA World Cup was played at White City. The game attracted 45,662 fans.

The stadium was demolished in 1985 and the site is now occupied by White City Place (formerly BBC White City).

== Greyhound racing ==
White City Stadium was principally used for greyhound racing for the majority of its existence. The first greyhound meeting took place on 20 June 1927. The stadium became the Mecca of greyhound racing with tens of thousands of spectators attending meetings on a regular basis, particularly in the 1940s, and 1950s. A crowd of 92,000 attended the 1939 English Greyhound Derby final.

The track was renowned for holding some of the sport's top events in addition to the English Greyhound Derby. They included the Grand National, the Oaks, the Wood Lane Stakes, the Longcross Cup and The Cambridgeshire. The final Greyhound Derby was held on 23 June 1984.

== Speedway ==
The speedway track at White City was 380 metres (420 yards) in length.

The White City stadium first held open speedway meetings in 1928 before the start of the Southern League in 1929. A team from the stadium known as White City (London) entered the 1929 Southern League where they finished in 7th place out of 11 teams (after Birmingham (Hall Green) resigned for the league after racing 7 league matches). The White City team were due to race in the 1930 Southern League, but they withdrew from the league before it started. The stadium then ran once again using an Open Licence and held occasional one-off meetings between (1953–1958, 1961) until a new league team was formed, from the Oxford 'Rebels' in 1976.

From 1976 until 1978, the stadium was home to White City Rebels speedway team. The team closed after only three seasons due to poor crowds levels, despite finishing the 1977 season as champions of the British League. The Rebels' most notable rider was England International Gordon Kennett. Other notable riders were Steve Weatherley, Trevor Geer, Poland's Marek Cieślak and multiple Finnish champion Kai Niemi and Colin Watson (pre war).

From 1979 to 1983 the stadium once again raced using an Open Licence hosting a number of high-profile Speedway World Championship qualifying rounds, including the Overseas and Intercontinental Finals during the 1970s, and 1980s. It also hosted the Final of the Speedway World Team Cup in 1976, 1979 and 1982.

Following the end of speedway at the Wembley Stadium after the 1981 World Final, White City became the home of international speedway in Great Britain until it was closed in 1984. Following this international speedway moved out of London and north to Odsal Stadium in Bradford.

=== Speedway World Finals ===
==== World Team Cup ====
- 1976 – Australia (John Boulger / Phil Crump / Billy Sanders / Phil Herne / Garry Middleton) – 42 pts
- 1979 – New Zealand (Ivan Mauger / Larry Ross / Mitch Shirra / Bruce Cribb / Roger Abel) – 35 pts
- 1982 – United States (Bruce Penhall / Bobby Schwartz / Kelly Moran / Shawn Moran / Scott Autrey) – 34 pts

== Appearances in the media ==
The White City Stadium features in the climax to the 1950 film The Blue Lamp. It also appears in an episode of 1960s television spy series Man in a Suitcase ("Man From the Dead"), and was used in the 1973 film Steptoe and Son Ride Again. Some sections of the video for The Human League single "Life On Your Own" were shot in the stadium in 1984, just a few months before its demolition.

The stadium is shown in the 1956 comedy centred on greyhound racing Jumping for Joy. It was also shown in the 1960 episode of 77 Sunset Strip, "The Double Death of Benny Markham".

The stadium was the location of a public outburst by Ray Davies of The Kinks during a July 1973 performance. Davies swore onstage, and at the show's conclusion, as pretaped music played on the sound system, declared his retirement from the group. He subsequently collapsed after a drug overdose and was rushed to hospital. He would eventually recover and return to recording with The Kinks.

At a David Cassidy show on 26 May 1974, 800 people were injured in a crush at the front of the stage. Thirty were taken to hospital, and one, 14-year-old Bernadette Whelan, died on 30 May from injuries.

The Pogues made a song about the stadium and its demolition, called "White City". It can be found on their 1989 album Peace and Love.

Also appears in The Sweeney episode 'May'

== See also ==
- Rugby union at the 1908 Summer Olympics
- List of Commonwealth Games venues

== Sources ==
- White, Valerie (1980). Wimpey: The first hundred years. George Wimpey.
