= Jack Harvey (greyhound trainer) =

British greyhound racing professional trainer (1907-1996)

Personal information
- Born: 7 October 1907 Rugby, England
- Died: March 1996 (aged 88)
- Occupation: Greyhound Trainer

Sport
- Sport: Greyhound racing

Achievements and titles
- National finals: Derby wins: English Derby (1934), (1959); Scottish Derby (1959); Welsh Derby (1950, 1959); Classic/Feature wins: St Leger (1949, 1954, 1955, 1958, 1961); Cesarewitch (1955, 1958, 1959, 1961); Laurels (1954, 1958, 1959, 1961); Oaks (1951, 1955, 1956, 1961, 1962)

Harry "Jack" Harvey (7 October 1907 – March 1996) was an English greyhound trainer. He was a UK champion trainer and two times winner of the English Greyhound Derby.

== Early life ==
Born near Rugby, Warwickshire, he attended his first coursing meeting with three of his own dogs which he slipped himself aged just ten years old. Harvey stayed in Paris in 1927 picking a job up as a greyhound trainer there before returning the following year. Harvey became an assistant trainer to Jack Chadwick at the opening of White City in 1927.

== Career ==
His first trainers licence was at Belle Vue Stadium before he moved to Harringay Stadium in the early thirties. It was whilst attached to Harringay that he won the 1934 English Greyhound Derby with Davesland. After building a large kennel he joined Wembley in 1937.

A second Derby crown was secured during the 1959 English Greyhound Derby with Mile Bush Pride and trained the greyhounds Shove Ha’penny, Clonalvy Pride, and Ballycurreen Garrett. He would achieve an incredible feat of having twenty-four Derby finalists in his career and retired in 1972 following the demolition of the Wembley Stadium kennels.

He died in March 1996.

== Awards ==
He was the inaugural winner of the Greyhound Trainer of the Year in 1961 and won the Triple Crown in 1959.
