= Puppy Derby =

Puppy Derby may refer to one of several greyhound races:

- English Puppy Derby, the original Puppy Derby race at Towcester Greyhound Stadium in Towcester, Northamptonshire, England
- Monmore Puppy Derby, a race at Monmore Green Stadium in Wolverhampton, England
- Northern Puppy Derby, at Newcastle Stadium in Newcastle, England
- Puppy Derby (Irish greyhound race), at Shelbourne Park in Dublin, Ireland

== See also ==
- Juvenile Classic, at Kingdom Greyhound Stadium in Tralee, Ireland
