= 2025 in UK and Ireland greyhound racing =

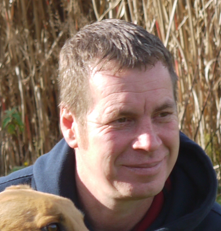
- Mark Wallis won a 16th trainer's title

2025 in UK and Ireland greyhound racing was the 100th year of greyhound racing in the United Kingdom and the 99th year of greyhound racing in Ireland. The year included a proposed prohibition on greyhound racing in Wales, the opening of Dunstall Park Greyhound Stadium, and the closures of Crayford Stadium, Perry Barr Stadium and Swindon Stadium (as it was known in the greyhound industry).

== Summary ==
The Greyhound Board of Great Britain (GBGB) category one and category two schedule was announced on 4 November 2024 and the Greyhound Racing Ireland (GRI) schedule was released during December 2024.

Following on from their November 2024 announcement, Entain announced the date of 19 January as the final meeting to be held at Crayford Stadium. The impact of the closure also signalled the end of hurdle racing because it had been the last track to feature hurdles. The only other track to hold hurdle racing, Central Park Stadium, had recently stopped racing over hurdles, although there was hope that Star Pelaw would start due to the fact that they had taken delivery of Crayford's hurdles.

Suffolk Downs remained closed following the 2024 fire and was expected to return in the late 2025 or early 2026.

In August 2025, the future of Wales' only track the Valley Greyhound Stadium was determined when the Welsh government announced plans to end racing sometime between 2027 and 2030. In response, GBGB CEO Mark Bird stated "This announcement has nothing to do with greyhound welfare and everything to do with pressure from the extreme animal rights movement. The Welsh Government’s own Summary of Consultation Responses highlighted the lack of evidence to support the case for a ban on the sport.". The Prohibition of Greyhound Racing (Wales) Bill was introduced to the Senedd on the 29 September 2025, with the aim of making it an offence to operate a stadium or similar venue for greyhound racing, or to be involved in organising greyhound racing.

In March, Swindon announced that it would close at the end of the year. The announcement was not a surprise because it followed on from the previous closures relating to Clarke Osborne and Gaming International/Stadia UK (formerley BS Group). Bristol, Reading, Milton Keynes and Poole were all closed by the company.

Mark Wallis won his fifth Trainers Championship, held at Perry Barr on 29 March. Wallis had an exceptional start to the year after changing his track attachment status to private, he won both the Cesarewitch and Blue Riband in January, the former with Garfiney Blaze again. This was followed by the TV Trophy and Golden Sprint in March. New Destiny won the Grand Prix and Proper Heiress won the Juvenile in April, defeating the wonder dog Bockos Diamond in the process. Mongys Wild who had won the TV Trophy went on to win both the Regency and St Leger. Proper Heiress would win his fifth title in November after winning the Eclipse in a track record time and finished the year with a sixth after securing victory in the Olympic.

Droopys Plunge won the 2025 English Greyhound Derby for Patrick Janssens. The black dog was a surprise 10/1 shot and foiled Irish Derby champion Bockos Diamond from winning a dual Derby and De Lahdedah from retaining his Derby title.

The completion of the build at Dunstall Park was on schedule and opened on 19 September.

Graham Holland claimed a record fifth Irish Greyhound Derby after Cheap Sandwiches won the 2025 Irish Derby.

On 1 November 2025 an organisation called Orchestrate took over the lease at Towcester from Kevin Boothby (Henlow Racing) but the move started badly with the English Puppy Derby not held due to unavailability of trials. Boothby also relinquished the lease at Suffolk Downs to the Arena Racing Company, who reverted the name back to Mildenhall Stadium. The lease was agreed with stadium landlords Spedeworth International Ltd and the management of the lease would be overseen by Simon Franklin, Director of Yarmouth Stadium.

== Roll of honour ==
Major Winners
| Award | Name of Winner |
|---|---|
| 2025 English Greyhound Derby | Droopys Plunge |
| 2025 Irish Greyhound Derby | Cheap Sandwiches |
| Greyhound Trainer of the Year | Mark Wallis |
| UK Greyhound of the Year | Proper Heiress |
| Irish Greyhound of the Year | |

=== Principal UK finals ===
Time Greyhound Nutrition TV Trophy, Towcester (23 March, 942m, £15,000)
| Pos | Name of Greyhound | Trap | SP | Time (sec) | Trainer |
|---|---|---|---|---|---|
| 1st | Mongys Wild | 1 | 11/8 | 57.41 | Mark Wallis |
| 2nd | Alright Patricia | 6 | 20/1 | 57.94 | David Lewis |
| 3rd | Alright Gordy | 5 | 20/1 | 57.99 | David Lewis |
| 4th | Ballymac Taylor | 4 | 10/11f | 58.16 | Mark Wallis |
| 5th | Swift Delta | 2 | 40/1 | 59.11 | Daniel Brabon |
| 6th | Bubbly Linferno | 3 | 7/1 | 00.00 | Paul Young |

PGR Trainers' Judgement Night, Perry Barr (29 March)
| Pos | Trainer | Track | Pts |
|---|---|---|---|
| 1st | Mark Wallis | Private | 41 |
| 2nd | Nathan Hunt | Romford | 39 |
| 3rd | Tom Heilbron | Newcastle | 36 |
| 4th | Patrick Janssens | Towcester | 33 |
| 5th | Maxine Locke | Romford | 26 |
| 6th | Kevin Hutton | Oxford | 25 |

Arena Racing Company Laurels, Perry Barr (19 Apr, 480m, £12,500)
| Pos | Name of Greyhound | Trap | SP | Time | Trainer |
|---|---|---|---|---|---|
| 1st | Aayamza Sydney | 3 | 7/2 | 27.78 | John Mullins |
| 2nd | Druids Say Go | 4 | 5/4f | 27.92 | Patrick Janssens |
| 3rd | Churchfield Syd | 6 | 7/4 | 28.10 | Richard Rees |
| 4th | Wrighty | 1 | 20/1 | 28.38 | John Mullins |
| 5th | Armagh Daithi | 5 | 9/1 | 28.44 | Mark Wallis |
| 6th | Coppice Trophy | 2 | 33/1 | 28.48 | Kevin Hutton |

Premier Greyhound Racing Regency, Brighton (2 Aug 695m, £20,000)
| Pos | Name of Greyhound | Trap | SP | Time | Trainer |
|---|---|---|---|---|---|
| 1st | Mongys Wild | 3 | 1/4f | 41.19 | Mark Wallis |
| 2nd | Romeo Empire | 2 | 6/1 | 41.51 | Patrick Janssens |
| 3rd | Droopys Invent | 5 | 33/1 | 41.71 | Seamus Cahill |
| 4th | Art Riddler | 4 | 10/1 | 41.79 | Seamus Cahill |
| 5th | Bombay Nutty | 6 | 8/1 | 41.80 | Mark Wallis |
| N/R | Garfiney Blaze | 1 | | | Mark Wallis |

Premier Greyhound Racing St Leger, Nottingham (22 Sep, 730m, £20,000)
| Pos | Name of Greyhound | Trap | SP | Time | Trainer |
|---|---|---|---|---|---|
| 1st | Mongys Wild | 3 | 5/6f | 43.85 | Mark Wallis |
| 2nd | Droopys Flare | 1 | 13/8 | 43.95 | Sean Parker |
| 3rd | Vhagar | 6 | 10/1 | 44.13 | Mark Wallis |
| 4th | Fabulous Heka | 5 | 9/1 | 44.17 | Patrick Janssens |
| 5th | Garfiney Blaze | 2 | 16/1 | 44.45 | Mark Wallis |
| 6th | Daring Moaner | 4 | 33/1 | 44.85 | David Fradgley |

Premier Greyhound Racing Oaks, Dunstall Park (24 Oct, 480m, £20,000)
| Pos | Name of Greyhound | Trap | SP | Time | Trainer |
|---|---|---|---|---|---|
| 1st | Butlers Lane | 5 | 7/2 | 27.95 | Barry Denby |
| 2nd | Kilwest Diva | 3 | 9/2 | 28.09 | Kim Billingham |
| 3rd | Raebella Bullet | 4 | 6/1 | 28.15 | Belinda Green |
| 4th | Fabulous Aria | 1 | 15/8f | 28.21 | Patrick Janssens |
| 5th | Bridefort Lady | 2 | 14/1 | 28.31 | Nathan Hunt |
| 6th | Avongate Venus | 6 | 3/1 | 28.61 | Philip Milner |

=== Principal Irish finals ===
Bresbet Easter Cup, Shelbourne (5 Apr, 550y, €25,000)
| Pos | Name of Greyhound | Trap | SP | Time (sec) | Trainer |
|---|---|---|---|---|---|
| 1st | Hopes Teddy | 1 | 13/8f | 29.81 | Pat Buckley |
| 2nd | Randolph Scotts | 3 | 5/2 | 30.02 | Peter Cronin |
| 3rd | Barefoot On Song | 4 | 25/1 | 30.05 | Paul Hennessy |
| 4th | Tarsna Maasai | 6 | 6/1 | 30.23 | Geoff Parnaby |
| 5th | Da Bold Falcon | 2 | 10/3 | 00.00 | John McGee |
| 6th | Hawkfield Blue | 5 | 7/1 | dnf | John McGee |

Con & Annie Kirby Memorial, Limerick (19 Apr, 525y, €80,000)
| Pos | Name of Greyhound | Trap | SP | Time | Trainer |
|---|---|---|---|---|---|
| 1st | Faypoint Ranger | 4 | 4/6f | 28.05 | Graham Holland |
| 2nd | Sole Mio | 2 | 8/1 | 28.36 | Peter Cronin |
| 3rd | Bubbly Charger | 1 | 10/3 | 28.64 | Brendan Matthews |
| 4th | Skywalker Schar | 5 | 28/1 | 28.78 | Michael J O'Donovan |
| 5th | Pain Barrier | 3 | 16/1 | 28.79 | Brendan Matthews |
| 6th | Droopys Deploy | 6 | 11/2 | 28.90 | Robert G. Gleeson |

Kasko Petfood National Produce, Clonmel (1 Jun, 525y, €20,000)
| Pos | Name of Greyhound | Trap | SP | Time | Trainer |
|---|---|---|---|---|---|
| 1st | Lemon Joey | 5 | 9/4 | 28.60 | Murt Leahy |
| 2nd | Flashing Saffron | 2 | 2/1f | 28.74 | Pat Buckley |
| 3rd | Tetra Destiny | 1 | 28/1 | 28.77 | Benalmadena Syndicate |
| 4th | Born Braver | 4 | 9/2 | 28.78 | Jennifer O'Donnell |
| 5th | Blastoff Heffo | 3 | 20/1 | 28.79 | Philip Buckley |
| 6th | Snazzy Boss | 6 | 5/2 | 28.86 | Graham Holland |

Sporting Press Oaks, Shelbourne Park (14 Jun, 525y, €25,000)
| Pos | Name of Greyhound | Trap | SP | Time | Trainer |
|---|---|---|---|---|---|
| 1st | Carrigmore Freya | 5 | 9/4 | 28.17 | Graham Holland |
| 2nd | Sadies Lucy | 3 | 10/3 | 28.66 | Paul Duffy |
| 3rd | Blackeyed Turbo | 4 | 20/1 | 29.50 | Kevin Losty |
| 4th | Innfield Riddle | 2 | 6/1 | 30.02 | Barry Clancy |
| 5th | Lemon Orla | 1 | 11/3 | 30.16 | Tom O'Neill |
| 6th | Ballymac Marcia | 6 | 20/1 | 00.00 | Liam Dowling |

Boylesports Champion Stakes, Shelbourne Park (5 Jul, 550y, €20,000)
| Pos | Name of Greyhound | Trap | SP | Time | Trainer |
|---|---|---|---|---|---|
| 1st | Seven Beach | 5 | 11/8f | 29.39 | Jennifer O'Donnell |
| 2nd | Cheque For Cash | 2 | 9/1 | 29.44 | Karol Ramsbottom |
| 3rd | Lennies Desire | 6 | 4/1 | 29.55 | Paul Hennessy |
| 4th | Ballymac Danica | 4 | 5/2 | 29.58 | Liam Dowling |
| 5th | Faypoint Harvey | 1 | 6/1 | 29.83 | Graham Holland |
| N/R | Ballyhooly Bruno | 3 | | | Tom O'Neill |

Time Dundalk International, Dundalk (12 Jul, 550y, €20,000)
| Pos | Name of Greyhound | Trap | SP | Time | Trainer |
|---|---|---|---|---|---|
| 1st | Cheap Sandwiches | 6 | | 30.06 | Graham Holland |
| 2nd | Wicky Ned | 1 | | 30.09 | James Fenwick (UK) |
| 3rd | Ballinabola Joe | 5 | | 30.10 | Pat Buckley |
| 4th | Callaway Knegare | 2 | | 30.19 | Owen McKenna |
| 5th | Lemon Joey | 4 | | 30.20 | Murt Leahy |
| 6th | Daleroad Duke | 3 | | 30.21 | Patrick Guilfoyle |

Time Juvenile Derby, Shelbourne Park (8 Aug, 525y, €25,000)
| Pos | Name of Greyhound | Trap | SP | Time | Trainer |
|---|---|---|---|---|---|
| 1st | Getup The Boy | 1 | 16/1 | 28.31 | Mark Robinson |
| 2nd | Unanimous | 2 | 6/1 | 28.36 | Pat Buckley |
| 3rd | Droopys Faithful | 4 | 9/2 | 28.47 | Daniel O'Rahilly |
| 4th | Ballymac Tibet | 5 | 10/3 | 28.54 | Liam Dowling |
| 5th | Rural Pest | 6 | 5/4f | 28.61 | Graham Holland |
| 6th | Toolmaker King | 3 | 9/2 | 28.78 | Robert G.Gleeson |

Callaway Pro Am Irish St Leger, Limerick (9 Aug, 550y, €30,000)
| Pos | Name of Greyhound | Trap | SP | Time | Trainer |
|---|---|---|---|---|---|
| 1st | Drombeg Banner | 2 | 20/1 | 29.57 | Evan McAuliffe |
| 2nd | Flight Club | 6 | 12/1 | 29.58 | Paul Hennessy |
| 3rd | Blastoff Heffo | 1 | 5/1 | 29.68 | Philip Buckley |
| 4th | Clonbrien Treaty | 4 | 13/8 | 29.75 | Graham Holland |
| 5th | Cagey Billy | 3 | 25/1 | 29.82 | Christopher Delaney |
| 6th | Hello Diego | 5 | 11/10f | 29.86 | Paul Hennessy |

Bar One Racing Irish Sprint Cup, Dundalk (15 Aug, 400y, €20,000)
| Pos | Name of Greyhound | Trap | SP | Time | Trainer |
|---|---|---|---|---|---|
| 1st | Southwind Wild | 5 | - | 21.08 | Pat Bckley |
| 2nd | Droopys Patriot | 2 | - | 21.09 | Robert G. Gleeson |
| 3rd | Broadstrand Syd | 3 | - | 21.14 | John A. Linehan |
| 4th | Ballymac Brandan | 1 | - | 21.30 | Liam Dowling |
| 5th | Epic Ace | 6 | - | 21.51 | Patrick Guilfoyle |
| 6th | Stopnepark Browne | 4 | - | 21.63 | Michael J. O'Donovan |

BarOne Racing Irish Laurels, Cork (8 Nov, 525y, €30,000)
| Pos | Name of Greyhound | Trap | SP | Time | Trainer |
|---|---|---|---|---|---|
| 1st | Magical On Fire | 4 | 13/2 | 27.93 | Patrick Guilfoyle |
| 2nd | Solo And Go | 1 | 7/4jf | 27.94 | Liam Dowling |
| 3rd | Lemon Joey | 6 | 5/1 | 28.04 | Murt Leahy |
| 4th | Trionas Tribe | 5 | 50/1 | 28.67 | Michael Wren |
| 5th | Ballymac Setanta | 3 | 7/4jf | 28.74 | Liam Dowling |
| 6th | Ballymac Brandan | 2 | 13/2 | 28.99 | Liam Dowling |

=== Calendar and results ===
The Greyhound Board of Great Britain (GBGB) Category One and category Two schedule was announced on 4 November 2024. The Greyhound Racing Ireland (GRI) schedule was released during November 2024.

| Date | Competition | Venue | 1st prize | Winner |
|---|---|---|---|---|
| 24 Jan | Coral Essex Vase | Romford | £10,000 | Droopys Eunice |
| 25 Jan | ARC Cesarewitch | Central Park | £12,500 | Garfiney Blaze |
| 25 Jan | BGBF Puppy Cup | Oxford | £10,000 | Queen Sinead |
| 26 Jan | Greyhound Racing UK Blue Riband | Towcester | £10,000 | Table Toppers |
| 20 Feb | ARC Northern Puppy Derby | Newcastle | £12,500 | Droopys Deploy |
| 22 Feb | Ladbrokes Winter Derby | Monmore | £10,000 | Proper Heiress |
| 22 Feb | Tote Gold Cup | Shelbourne | €16,000 | Seven Beach |
| 7 Mar | Juvenile Classic | Tralee | €11,000 | Droopys Patriot |
| 9 Mar | Time Irish Cesarewitch | Mullingar | €10,000 | Singalong Dolly |
| 15 Mar | Premier Greyhound Racing Puppy Derby | Monmore | £20,000 | Headford Dane |
| 17 Mar | BGBF British Breeders Stakes | Nottingham | £12,500 | Romeo Control |
| 21 Mar | Coral Golden Sprint | Romford | £10,000 | Union Rebel |
| 21 Mar | The Deadly Kennels McCalmont Cup | Kilkenny | €15,000 | Lotto Other News |
| 23 Mar | Time TV Trophy | Towcester | £15,000 | Mongys Wild |
| 29 Mar | ARC Kent Plate | Central Park | £12,500 | Proper Heiress |
| 5 Apr | Bresbet Easter Cup | Shelbourne | €25,000 | Hopes Teddy |
| 18 Apr | Arena Racing Company Grand Prix | Sunderland | £12,500 | New Destiny |
| 19 Apr | Con & Annie Kirby Memorial | Limerick | €80,000 | Faypoint Ranger |
| 19 Apr | Arena Racing Company Laurels | Perry Barr | £12,500 | Aayamza Sydney |
| 19 Apr | bet365 Hunt Cup | Oxford | £10,000 | Hogans Hawk |
| 19 Apr | Droopys Stud Select Stakes | Waterford | €10,000 | Seven Beach |
| 20 Apr | Time Greyhound Nutrition Juvenile | Towcester | £10,000 | Proper Heiress |
| 20 Apr | BresBet Gymcrack | Sheffield | £17,500 | Elusivenomore |
| 20 Apr | BetGoodwin & JR Racing Maiden Derby | Towcester | £10,000 | Hello Diego |
| 26 Apr | Coral Brighton Belle | Hove | £10,000 | Runaway Dior |
| 3 May | Shelbourne 600 | Shelbourne | €15,000 | Ballyhooly Bruno |
| 1 Jun | Carrick Aldo at stud National Produce | Clonmel | €20,000 | Lemon Joey |
| 13 Jun | Callaway ProAm at Stud Race of Champions | Tralee | €15,000 | Seven Beach |
| 14 Jun | Sporting Press Online Oaks | Shelbourne | €25,000 | Carrigmore Freya |
| 14 Jun | Star Sports & TRC Events & Leisure English Greyhound Derby | Towcester | £175,000 | Droopys Plunge |
| 28 Jun | ARC Kent Silver Salver | Central Park | £12,500 | Rioja Oisin |
| 28 Jun | Donal Beatty Memorial Corn Cuchulainn | Shelbourne | €10,500 | Braveheart Bambi |
| 4 Jul | Coral Coronation Cup | Romford | £10,000 | Fabulous Sonique |
| 5 Jul | Boylesports Champion Stakes | Shelbourne | €20,000 | Seven Beach |
| 6 Jul | Time Three Steps to Victory | Sheffield | £10,000 | Wicky Ned |
| 12 Jul | Time Dundalk International | Dundalk | €20,000 | Cheap Sandwiches |
| 16 Jul | Centenary Agri Tipperary Cup | Thurles | €7,200 | Jim By Two |
| 20 Jul | JR Juvenile Classic | Towcester | £10,000 | Romeo Alliance |
| 24 Jul | Time Greyhound Feed Northern Flat | Newcastle | £12,500 | Naochra |
| 24 Jul | ARC Angel of the North | Newcastle | £7,500 | Skeard Josie |
| 26 Jul | BetGoodwin Pall Mall | Oxford | £10,000 | Gingers Prince |
| 2 Aug | Coral Sussex Cup | Hove | £10,000 | Proper Heiress |
| 2 Aug | Premier Greyhound Racing Regency | Hove | £20,000 | Mongys Wild |
| 8 Aug | Time Juvenile Derby | Shelbourne | €25,000 | Getup The Boy |
| 9 Aug | Callaway Pro Am at Stud Irish St Leger | Limerick | €30,000 | Drombeg Banner |
| 15 Aug | Bar One Racing Irish Sprint Cup | Dundalk | €20,000 | Southwind Wild |
| 23 Aug | Ladbrokes Summer Stayers Classic | Monmore | £10,000 | Headford Dane |
| 23 Aug | Ladbrokes Gold Cup | Monmore | £10,000 | Vhagar |
| 25 Aug | ARC Puppy Classic | Nottingham | £12,500 | Romeo Alliance |
| 25 Aug | ARC Select Stakes | Nottingham | £12,500 | Wicky Ned |
| 17 Sep | Click Competitions East Anglian Derby | Yarmouth | £15,000 | Romeo Steel |
| 19 Sep | Coral Romford Puppy Cup | Romford | £10,000 | Scooby Diamond |
| 20 Sep | 77th Produce Stakes | Swindon | £10,000 | Eagles Respect |
| 21 Sep | bet365 Empress Stakes | Towcester | £10,000 | Silverhill Freya |
| 22 Sep | ARC Birmingham Cup | Nottingham | £12,500 | Chelms Bear |
| 22 Sep | PGR St Leger | Nottingham | £20,000 | Mongys Wild |
| 27 Sep | Boylesports Irish Greyhound Derby | Shelbourne | €125,000 | Cheap Sandwiches |
| 17 Oct | Premier Greyhound Racing Champion Stakes | Romford | £20,000 | New Destiny |
| 18 Oct | Premier Greyhound Racing Kent Derby | Central Park | £20,000 | Romeo Tomcat |
| 19 Oct | BresBet Steel City Cup | Sheffield | £11,500 | Romeo Steel |
| 24 Oct | ARC Scurry Gold Cup | Dunstall Park | £7,500 | Shadow Storm |
| 24 Oct | Premier Greyhound Racing Oaks | Dunstall Park | £20,000 | Butlers Lane |
| 2 Nov | KAB Puppy Collar | Oxford | £10,000 | Outa The Clouds |
| 8 Nov | BarOne Racing Irish Laurels | Cork | €30,000 | Magical on Fire |
| 9 Nov | Coral Gold Collar | Brighton | £10,000 | Noellie |
| 21 Nov | Premier Greyhound Racing Classic | Sunderland | £20,000 | Santas Amigo |
| 24 Nov | Premier Greyhound Racing Eclipse | Nottingham | £20,000 | Proper Heiress |
| 30 Nov | English Puppy Derby | Towcester | £10,000 | cancelled |
| 13 Dec | bet365 Challenge Cup | Oxford | £10,000 | Vhagar |
| 13 Dec | George Curtis/Ballyregan Bob Memorial | Hove | £10,000 | Deadly Disco |
| 13 Dec | Coral Olympic | Hove | £10,000 | Proper Heiress |
| 21 Dec | BGBF British Bred Derby | Towcester | £10,000 | King Memphis |
| 22 Dec | ARC National Sprint | Nottingham | £7,500 | Shadow Storm |
| 27 Dec | Premier Greyhound Racing All England Cup | Newcastle | £20,000 | Santas Amigo |
| 28 Dec | bet365 Puppy Oaks | Oxford | £10,000 | Rapido Spy |
