= 2021 UK & Ireland Greyhound Racing Year =

2021 UK & Ireland Greyhound Racing Year was the 96th year of greyhound racing in the United Kingdom and the 95th year of greyhound racing in Ireland.

== Roll of honour ==
Major Winners
Award	Name of Winner
2021 English Greyhound Derby	Thorn Falcon
2021 Irish Greyhound Derby	Susie Sapphire
Greyhound Trainer of the Year	Mark Wallis
UK Greyhound of the Year	Signet Ace
Irish Greyhound of the Year	Susie Sapphire

Arc/Entain Trainers Championship, Nottingham (6 Sep)
Pos	Name of Trainer	Points
1st	Kevin Hutton	45
2nd	Angela Harrison	40
3rd	John Mullins	38
4th	David Mullins	32
5th	Mark Wallis	28
6th	Patrick Janssens	20

== Summary ==
The main news throughout the year was the announcement of a five-year deal between Entain and ARC for a new joint venture of live broadcast rights from 1 January 2024 until 31 December 2029. The deal was described in some news articles as revamping and revitalising greyhound racing's wider betting appeal but in truth the deal although inevitable (a bookmaker owned industry had been predicted 20 years previously) was potentially a serious problem for a third of the industry. The deal in detail meant that the Entain/Ladbrokes Coral owned tracks (Crayford, Hove, Monmore and Romford) and the ARC tracks (Newcastle, Nottingham, Perry Barr and Sunderland) would form eight of the tracks with broadcast rights and they would likely be joined by two to four more tracks. This would mean that a further six to eight tracks would be financially unstable with no broadcast rights and would face an uncertain future. Shortly after the announcement Central Park Stadium was acquired by ARC, leaving Doncaster, Harlow, Henlow, Kinsley, Sheffield, Pelaw Grange, Shawfield, Swindon, Towcester and Yarmouth battling for rights before 2024.

The major disruption caused by the COVID-19 pandemic continued with racing remaining behind closed doors until the return of crowds was allowed on 17 May. The Derby returned to Towcester Greyhound Stadium following two years at Nottingham. The 2021 English Greyhound Derby was won by Thorn Falcon for Belgian born Patrick Janssens, thwarting an Irish attempt at a third consecutive success.

== News ==
Just one week after being named the 2020 Greyhound of the Year Aayamza Royale broke the 900 metres track record at Monmore, recording 55.95 seconds. In May 2021 Kevin Hutton returned to train out of Towcester following its reopening and later in September 2021, won his fourth trainers championship (the first as the rebranded Judgement Night).

Towcester and Henlow owner Kevin Boothby announced his intention to re-open Oxford Stadium and Mildenhall Stadium (the latter would be known as Suffolk Downs) with renovation work beginning on the tracks in July, which continued until the end of the year. Originally he had hoped to open both tracks before Christmas but this did not materialise.

The Oaks was switched from Swindon to Perry Barr due to the ongoing saga surrounding Swindon's redevelopment.

Mark Wallis extended his Greyhound Trainer of the Year record to twelve titles.

== Competitions ==
=== Ireland ===
The Champion Stakes was positioned in the racing calendar just before the Irish Derby and would give a great indication as to the form heading into the event. De Machine won the final, which contained six serious contenders for the Derby. Susie Sapphire was arguably the star in Ireland, after winning the Oaks she went unbeaten throughout the 2021 Irish Greyhound Derby and duly won the Irish greyhound of the year. Others that had a great year were Good Cody, Priceless Jet and Explosive Boy; Cody won the Sprint Cup and Kingdom Derby as well as reaching the Produce final; Priceless Jet was a St Leger and Champions Stakes finalist and won the Corn Cuchulainn; Explosive Boy reached the Irish Derby and Kirby finals and won the Produce.

=== UK ===
Havana Class won the first Laurels to be staged at Perry Barr in April and shortly afterwards trainer Ricky Holloway won his fourth Grand National, this time with Meenagh Maverick. In May, Aayamza Royale became the fourth greyhound to win the TV Trophy twice, also setting a record of fours wins for trainer Mark Wallis in the process. Royale broke the track record to complete a memorable feat. In July, Aayamza Royale continued her stunning form by winning the £10,000 Regency.

Aayamza Royale was the leading contender to become the first greyhound since Westmead Hawk to win Greyhound of the Year for two consecutive years. She would be challenged by Space Jet (a newcomer that won the St Leger in a track record time), Thorn Falcon (the Derby champion), Signet Ace and Salacres Pippy. The award went to Signet Ace, who had claimed the Winter Derby, Eclipse and Select Stakes.

=== Principal UK finals ===
Ladbrokes Golden Jacket, Crayford (20 Feb, 714m, £17,500)
Pos	Name of Greyhound	Trap	SP	Time	Trainer
1st	Punk Rock Mutley	6	33-1	45.78	Stuart Maplesden
2nd	Redzer Renae	4	4-1	46.12	Anthony Gifkins
3rd	Ragtime Storm	3	6-1	46.20	Daniel Brabon
4th	Sweet Leaf	2	12-1	46.24	Emma Richards
5th	Ahnid News	5	9-1	46.38	Mark Wallis
6th	Bo Shine Bullet	1	8-13f	00.00	Mark Wallis

Arena Racing Company Laurels, Perry Barr (22 Apr, 480m, £6,500)
Pos	Name of Greyhound	Trap	SP	Time	Trainer
1st	Havana Class	2	3-1jf	28.68	Liz McNair
2nd	Ivy Hill Skyhigh	1	5-1	28.69	Mark Wallis
3rd	Sparta Master	4	4-1	28.79	Sharon Thompson
4th	Candy Man	6	10-3	28.80	Carol Weatherall
5th	Coolavanny Kyser	3	3-1jf	29.02	Mark Wallis
6th	Adeles Duke	5	10-1	29.22	Lee Field

RPGTV Grand National, Central Park (9 May, 480mH, £7,500)
Pos	Name of Greyhound	Trap	SP	Time	Trainer
1st	Meenagh Maverick	2	3-1	29.53	Ricky Holloway
2nd	Toolmaker Daddy	6	11-4f	29.65	Ricky Holloway
3rd	Seaglass Smokey	3	3-1	29.91	Patrick Janssens
4th	Nomansland Flyer	5	9-2	30.35	Ricky Holloway
5th	Roxholme Biscuit	4	9-2	30.55	Ricky Holloway
6th	Bang On Sonia	1	18-1	30.69	Nathan Hunt

Ladbrokes TV Trophy, Monmore (22 May, 900m, £10,000)
Pos	Name of Greyhound	Trap	SP	Time	Trainer
1st	Aayamza Royale	4	8-13f	55.00 TR	Mark Wallis
2nd	Savana Volcano	6	5-2	55.91	Diane Henry
3rd	Galaxy Star	3	20-1	56.24	Stuart Maplesden
4th	Our Supreme Sue	1	50-1	56.27	Kelly Tobin
5th	Sporting Pat	2	11-2	56.55	Jerry Griffin
6th	Southfield Code	5	18-1	56.89	Kevin Hutton

BresBet East Anglian Derby, Yarmouth (15 Sep, 462m, £15,000)
Pos	Name of Greyhound	Trap	SP	Time	Trainer
1st	Antigua Storm	1	7–4f	27.78	Mark Wallis
2nd	Bockos Jon Jo	4	3–1	27.86	Patrick Janssens
3rd	King Bruno	6	11–2	27.94	Liz McNair
4th	Billis Tudor	5	6–1	27.99	Mark Wallis
5th	Lylas Boy	2	33–1	28.15	Nathan Hunt
6th	Aussie Captain	3	3–1	28.37	Patrick Janssens

ARC St Leger, Perry Barr (30 Sep, 710m, £10,000)
Pos	Name of Greyhound	Trap	SP	Time	Trainer
1st	Space Jet	3	10–3	42.59 (TR)	Matt Dartnall
2nd	Night Time Danny	4	5–2	42.69	Steve Rayner
3rd	Antigua Mememe	5	14–1	42.95	Mark Wallis
4th	Savana Volcano	6	9–2	42.98	Diane Henry
5th	Guiri Steve	1	11–1	43.34	Christopher Fereday
6th	Blueberry Bullet	2	2–1f	43.38	Mark Wallis

ARC Oaks, Perry Barr (28 Oct, 480m, £15,000)
Pos	Name of Greyhound	Trap	SP	Time	Trainer
1st	Billys Diva	1	2/1	28.88	Maria Kennedy
2nd	Ritzy Lady	6	9/1	28.94	Jim Reynolds
3rd	Ballymac Trend	3	9/1	29.44	David Mullins
4th	Droopys Samantha	2	9/1	29.45	Kevin Hutton
5th	Anniversary Girl	5	33/1	29.65	Kevin Hutton
6th	Skywalker Cilla	4	10/11f	29.73	Mark O'Donovan

Ladbrokes Cesarewitch, Crayford (27 Nov, 874m, £10,000)
Pos	Name of Greyhound	Trap	SP	Time	Trainer
1st	Salacres Pippy	3	5/2	56.56	Peter Harnden
2nd	Blueberry Bullet	2	13/8f	56.98	Mark Wallis
3rd	Alaskan Dawn	4	4/1	56.99	Heather Dimmock
4th	Antigua Lava	1	7/2	57.03	Mark Wallis
5th	Mays Sabbath	5	22/1	57.17	Patrick Janssens
6th	Nightingale Don	6	16/1	57.63	John Mullins

=== Principal Irish finals ===
Ladbrokes Easter Cup, Shelbourne (13 Mar, 550y, €25,000)
Pos	Name of Greyhound	Trap	SP	Time	Trainer
1st	Knocknaboul Syd	6	11-4	29.58	Pat Buckley
2nd	Beach Avenue	5	16-1	29.86	Paul Hennessy
3rd	Billys Diva	3	2-1jf	29.87	John Kennedy
4th	Great Name That	1	2-1jf	29.94	Liam Dowling
5th	Boylesportsbingo	4	18-1	30.39	Paul Hennessy
6th	Golden Tiger	2	7-1	00.00	Graham Holland

Con & Annie Kirby Memorial, Limerick (24 Apr, 525y, €80,000)
Pos	Name of Greyhound	Trap	SP	Time	Trainer
1st	Stonepark Leo	6	-	28.38	Mark O'Donovan
2nd	De Machine	2	-	28.48	Brendan Matthews
3rd	Agent Stanley	1	-	28.52	Marie Gilbert
4th	Explosive Boy	3	-	28.97	Patrick Guilfoyle
5th	Ballymac Merlin	5	-	29.29	Liam Dowling
6th	Singalong Sally	4	-	29.36	Pat Buckley

Larry O'Rourke National Produce, Clonmel (5 Jun, 525y, €16,000)
Pos	Name of Greyhound	Trap	SP	Time	Trainer
1st	Explosive Boy	1	-	28.28	Patrick Guilfoyle
2nd	Valegro	2	-	28.31	Maurice Heffernan
3rd	Deadly Destroyer	3	-	28.66	Karol Ramsbottom
4th	Good Cody	5	-	28.73	John Kennedy Jnr.
5th	Cash Return	4	-	29.05	Brendan Maunsell
6th	Courtmac Chief	6	-	29.68	John A Linehan

Sporting Press Oaks, Shelbourne (19 Jun, 525y, €25,000)
Pos	Name of Greyhound	Trap	SP	Time	Trainer
1st	Susie Sapphire	1	3-1	28.15	Owen McKenna
2nd	Scooby Princess	4	4-1	28.46	Jennifer O'Donnell
3rd	Billys Diva	2	6-4f	28.53	John Kennedy Jnr.
4th	Ballydoyle Rossa	5	12-1	28.67	Pio Barry
5th	Front Amani	6	7-4	28.74	Robert G. Gleeson
6th	Highview Magnet	3	33-1	28.78	Dolores Merriman

Boylesports Champion Stakes, Shelbourne (31 July, 550y, €20,000)
Pos	Name of Greyhound	Trap	SP	Time	Trainer
1st	De Machine	3	11–2	29.41	Bendan Matthews
2nd	Kilara Icon	4	14–1	29.69	Robert G Gleeson
3rd	Priceless Jet	5	5–1	29.72	Paul Hennessy
4th	Beach Avenue	6	10–1	29.74	Paul Hennessy
5th	Deadly Destroyer	1	10–11f	30.41	Karol Ramsbottom
6th	Ballymac Wild	2	9–2	30.42	Liam Dowling

Bar One Racing Irish Sprint Cup, Dundalk (15 Aug, 400y, €20,000)
Pos	Name of Greyhound	Trap	SP	Time	Trainer
1st	Good Cody	2	-	20.86	John Kennedy Jr.
2nd	Drahan Jet	4	-	21.14	Wayne Morris
3rd	Ela Supremo	6	-	21.15	Peter Cronin
4th	Maybe Aye	5	-	21.27	Peter Cronin
5th	Blue Corner	3	-	21.66	Thomas Shields
6th	Corbrack Prince	1	-	21.71	Robert G Gleeson

SIS Juvenile Derby, Shelbourne (16 Oct, 525y, €20,000)
Pos	Name of Greyhound	Trap	SP	Time	Trainer
1st	Droopys Gloss	3	5/2cf	28.49	Martin 'Murt' Leahy
2nd	Serene Ace	4	5/2cf	28.87	Mark O'Donovan
3rd	Off The Pitch	6	5/1	28.93	Marie Gilbert
4th	Barefoot Supremo	1	12/1	29.00	Paul Hennessy
5th	Deadly Diego	5	5/1	29.14	Karol Ramsbottom
6th	Crokers Spirit	2	5/2cf	29.21	Matthew Harte

Irish Laurels, Cork (23 Oct, 525y, €30,000)
Pos	Name of Greyhound	Trap	SP	Time	Trainer
1st	One Time Only	1	3–1	28.17	Thomas O'Donovan
2nd	Skywalker Barry	5	9–4jf	28.41	Mark O'Donovan
3rd	Epic Hero	4	20–1	28.76	Thomas O'Donovan
4th	Ballymac Fairone	3	9–4jf	28.97	Liam Dowling
5th	Sweep The Yard	6	10–1	29.04	Graham Holland
6th	Droopys Good	1	9–2	29.22	Owen McKenna

Matchbook Betting Exchange Irish St Leger, Limerick (27 Nov, 550y, €30,000)
Pos	Name of Greyhound	Trap	SP	Time	Trainer
1st	Ballymac Merlin	4	8/1	29.68	Liam Dowling
2nd	Deerjet Sydney	3	5/1	29.73	Pat Buckley
3rd	Priceless Jet	6	4/1	29.84	Paul Hennessy
4th	Allforthebest	5	8/1	30.01	syndicate
5th	Russian Glory	1	9/4f	30.12	Graham Holland
6th	Part Blake	2	5/2	30.33	Graham Holland

=== UK Category 1 & 2 competitions ===
Competition	Date	Venue	Winning Greyhound	Winning Trainer	Time	SP	Notes
Coral Essex Vase	22 Jan	Romford	Antigua Romeo	Mark Wallis (Henlow)	34.66	8-1	
TRC Health & Hygiene Blue Riband	6 Feb	Towcester	Kilara Lion	Patrick Janssens (Central Park)	29.73	11-8f	
Ladbrokes Puppy Derby	27 Feb	Monmore	Jaguar Macie	Graham Rankin (Pelaw Grange)	28.04	9-2	
Ladbrokes Winter Derby	27 Feb	Monmore	Signet Ace	Kevin Hutton (Monmore)	28.08	6-1	
Coral Golden Sprint	19 Mar	Romford	Bockos Jon Jo	Patrick Janssens (Towcester)	23.77	10-11f	
BGBF British Breeders Stakes	22 Mar	Nottingham	King Louis	Liz McNair (Private)	29.63	9-2	
Northern Puppy Derby	31 Mar	Newcastle	Jaguar Macie	Graham Rankin (Pelaw Grange)	28.52	13-8f	
Cearnsport Springbok	4 Apr	Central Park	Droopys Rex	David Mullins (Romford)	29.94	7-2	
TRC Health & Hygiene Northamptonshire Sprint	13 Apr	Towcester	Bockos Jon Jo	Patrick Janssens (Towcester)	16.10	1-2f	
Arena Racing Company Grand Prix	20 Apr	Sunderland	Coolavanny Bani	Angela Harrison (Newcastle)	39.21	7-2	
RPGTV Juvenile	20 Apr	Towcester	Ballymac Trend	Kevin Boon (Towcester)	29.62	7-1	
KAB Maiden Derby	18 May	Towcester	Thorn Falcon	Patrick Janssens (Towcester)	29.24	10-11f	
Arena Racing Company Northern Flat	19 May	Newcastle	Pacemaker Ted	Tom Heilbron (Newcastle)	28.37	9-4f	
George Ing St Leger	29 May	Yarmouth	Blue Tick George	Jim Daly (Crayford)	40.31	11-10jf	
Ladbrokes Kent St Leger	26 Jun	Crayford	Bo Shine Bullet	Mark Wallis (Henlow)	45.55	1-1f	
Ladbrokes Guys and Dolls	26 Jun	Crayford	Punk Rock Doll	Stuart Maplesden (Hove)	23.00	4–1	
Ladbrokes Kent Vase	26 Jun	Crayford	Ballynabee Jet	Samantha West (Hove)	34.03	100–30	
Stadium Bookmakers Juvenile Classic	20 Jul	Towcester	Brookside Richie	David Mullins (Romford)	29.48	11–10f	
Coral Regency	31 Jul	Hove	Aayamza Royale	Mark Wallis (Henlow)	41.56	11–4	
Coral Sussex Cup	31 Jul	Hove	Drumcrow Brent	Mark Wallis (Henlow)	29.89	5–1	
Ladbrokes Summer Stayers Classic	21 Aug	Monmore	Coolavanny Bani	Angela Harrison (Newcastle)	37.87	4–1	
Ladbrokes Gold Cup	21 Aug	Monmore	Minglers Popeye	Stuart Tighe (Newcastle)	28.45	11–2	
Stadium Bookmakers Marathon Trophy	22 Aug	Towcester	Savana Volcano	Diane Henry (Towcester)	58.27	2–1	
ARC Puppy Classic	30 Aug	Nottingham	Bubbly Apache	Paul Young (Romford)	29.53	2–1	
Select Stakes	30 Aug	Nottingham	Signet Ace	Kevin Hutton (Towcester)	29.72	9/4f	
Gain Nutrition 3 Steps to Victory	7 Sep	Sheffield	Savana Eruption	Diane Henry (Towcester)	39.14	15–8f	
75th Produce Stakes	19 Sep	Swindon	Pocket Lola	Seamus Cahill (Brighton)	28.15	5–6f	
Coral Romford Puppy Cup	24 Sep	Romford	Brookside Richie	David Mullins (Romford)	23.68	1–3f	
Stadium Bookmakers Empress Stakes	26 Sep	Towcester	Coolavanny Aunty	Angela Harrison (Newcastle)	29.34	13–8f	
M Lambe Construction Birmingham Cup	30 Sep	Perry Barr	Candy Man	Carol Weatherall (Sheffield)	28.10	5–1	
Property 192 Graders Derby	10 Oct	Towcester	Deanridge Awesom	Allison Kelly-Pilgrim (Crayford)	29.57	4–6f	
BGBF Puppy Cup	17 Oct	Towcester	Moments of Magic	Kevin Hutton (Towcester)	27.62	11–2	
Kent Derby	17 Oct	Central Park	Galaxy Freedom	Stuart Maplesden (Hove)	29.26	28–1	
Coral Champion Stakes	22 Oct	Romford	Night Time Danny	Steve Rayner (Henlow)	34.94	3–1	
1st Containers Marathon Trophy	24 Oct	Towcester	Space Jet	Matt Dartnall (Central Park)	56.67	7–4f	
Scurry Gold Cup	28 Oct	Perry Barr	Crossfield Dusty	Patrick Janssens (Towcester)	16.26	10/11f	
Bresbet Steel City Cup	30 Oct	Sheffield	Forest Gold	Kevin Hutton (Towcester)	28.71	3/1	
Stadium Bookmakers Hunt Cup	14 Nov	Towcester	Salacres Pippy	Peter Harnden (Towcester)	42.90	9/4	Track record
ARC Classic	18 Nov	Sunderland	Narcos The Great	George Cunningham (Private)	26.84	13/2	
Ladbrokes Kent Rosebowl	27 Nov	Crayford	Icaals Rocco	John Mullins (Towcester)	23.38	8/1	
Ladbrokes Gold Collar	27 Nov	Crayford	Warzone Tom	Liz McNair (Private)	33.58	4/6f	
Eclipse	6 Dec	Nottingham	Signet Ace	Kevin Hutton (Towcester)	29.41	11/10f	
Coral Olympic	18 Dec	Hove	Prince of Troy	David Mullins (Romford)	30.21	25/1	
Coral Brighton Belle	18 Dec	Hove	Lights Out	Kevin Hutton (Towcester)	30.28	9/4	
The Puppy Derby	19 Dec	Towcester	Make Noise	Seamus Cahill (Hove)	29.71	15/8	
ARC Champion Hurdle	19 Dec	Central Park	Toolmaker Daddy	Ricky Holloway (Private)	30.26	11/1	
ARC National Sprint	20 Dec	Nottingham	Crossfield Dusty	Patrick Janssens (Towcester)	17.65	8/11f	
BGBF British Bred Derby	21 Dec	Sheffield	Fabulous Azurra	Patrick Janssens (Towcester)	28.73	5/2	
All England Cup	28 Dec	Newcastle	Moanteen Mikey	Angela Harrison (Newcastle)	28.72	11/4f	
Coronation Cup	cancelled due to COVID-19 pandemic						

=== Irish feature competitions ===
Competition	Date	Venue	Winning Greyhound	Winning Trainer	Time	SP	Notes
Shelbourne 600	2 Jan	Shelbourne	Ballymac Kingdom	Liam Dowling	32.30	No SP	NO SP due to COVID-19
Best Car Parks Gold Cup	6 Feb	Shelbourne	Inforapenny	Kieran Lynch	28.97	5-1	
Greyhound & Petworld Juvenile Classic	12 Mar	Tralee	Singalong Sally	Pat Buckley	28.58	No SP	No SP due to COVID-19
Ballymac Anton at Stud McCalmont Cup	26 Mar	Kilkenny	Dark Devil	Martin (Murt) Leahy	28.86	No SP	No SP due to COVID-19
Waterford Select Stakes	20 Apr	Waterford	Skywalker Barry	Mark O'Donovan	28.14	No SP	No SP due to COVID-19
SIS Irish Cesarewitch	16 May	Mullingar	Amazing Alice	Patrick Guilfoyle	33.20	9-4	
SIS Race of Champions	19 Jun	Tralee	Explosive Boy	Patrick Guilfoyle	29.36	No SP	NO SP due to COVID-19
Corn Cuchulainn	17 Jul	Shelbourne	Priceless Jet	Paul Hennessy	41.39	9-4f	
Champion 550	17 Jul	Shelbourne	Deadly Destroyer	Karol Ramsbottom	29.36	4/1	
Centenary Agri Tipperary Cup	7 Aug	Thurles	Freedom Epic	Kathleen Pomfret	29.02	No SP	NO SP due to COVID-19
Kingdom Derby	21 Dec	Tralee	Good Cody	Patrick Guilfoyle	28.25	9/4	
Dundalk International	cancelled due to COVID-19 pandemic						
