= Valley Greyhound Stadium =

Welsh greyhound track

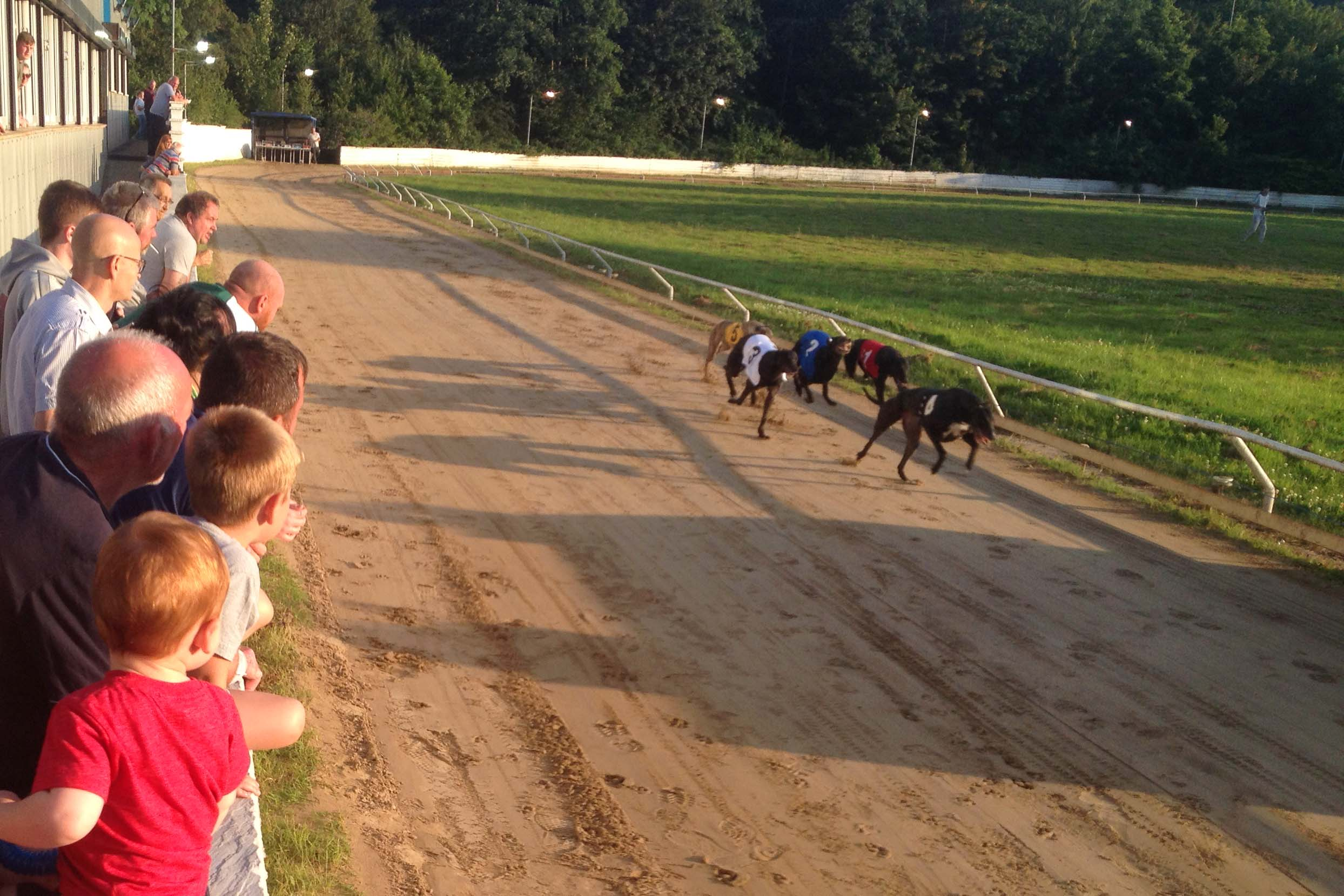
- Interactive map of Valley Greyhound Stadium
- Location: Twyn Road, Ystrad Mynach, Hengoed, CF82 7SP Wales
- Coordinates: 51°37′57.7″N 3°13′57.6″W

Construction
- Opened: 1976
- Renovated: 2011

Website
- Official website

The Valley Greyhound Stadium is a greyhound racing stadium in Twyn Road, Ystrad Mynach, Hengoed, Wales. In 2023, the stadium became affiliated to the Greyhound Board of Great Britain (GBGB).

== Location ==
The track, known as 'The Valley', is on Twyn Road (CF82 7SP) sandwiched between the Caerphilly Road and A469 and the east bank of the Rhymney River (on the north side of the Dyffryn Business Park).

== Licensing ==
It is the only remaining greyhound racing track in Wales and, until August 2023, was independent (not affiliated to the GBGB but, instead, licensed by the local authority). In August 2023, it received a licensing regulation from the Greyhound Board of Great Britain

== History ==
Planning for the stadium was given during April 1975. The stadium opened to greyhound racing on 20 July 1976, with the first ever winner being a greyhound called 'Boss' who won in a time of 19.20 seconds over 310 yards. The circuit was 410 yards in circumference consisting of race distances of 310, 515 and 720 yards. The track also staged occasional '100 yard dash' races. The principal events held at the track were the Welsh Greyhound Derby (the richest greyhound race in Wales) and the Glamorgan Cup. In 2011, the stadium underwent a significant renovation including an indoor lounge with seating, panoramic viewing, television race replay monitors and a fully licensed bar.

In February 2020, flooding caused a temporary closure after the Rhymney River burst its banks. However, the greyhound owners and supporters put in hundreds of hours of voluntary work to help repair the racing surface and repaint the stadium, which reopened only three weeks later. In 2021, restrictions imposed by the Welsh Government to combat the coronavirus pandemic meant that the stadium had to shut for 161 days. When it reopened on 22 May 2021 the first post-lockdown meeting sold out.

In October 2019, Star Sports Bookmakers (sponsors of the English Greyhound Derby) announced an interest in acquiring the Valley Greyhound Stadium with a view to its operating as a Greyhound Board of Great Britain licensed track in 2021. However, the economic crisis caused by 2020's COVID pandemic led to the plans being shelved.

In December 2021, Dave Barclay (owner and promoter of Harlow Stadium), announced that he had completed a deal to buy the Valley Greyhound Stadium with a view to its operating as a Greyhound Board of Great Britain (GBGB) licensed track by the end of 2023. In the meantime, the stadium continued to stage independent greyhound racing every week. The final 'flapping' race took place on 29 July 2023, when a puppy called Pandy Charlie won the last independent race at the track.

In August 2023, the stadium received licensing regulation from the GBGB and held their first under rules on 3 November 2023. The first winner was Catunda Spirit.

In February 2025, a ban on greyhound racing was announced in Wales over animal welfare, which would result in the closure of the stadium. In response, GBGB CEO Mark Bird stated "This announcement has nothing to do with greyhound welfare and everything to do with pressure from the extreme animal rights movement. The Welsh Government’s own Summary of Consultation Responses highlighted the lack of evidence to support the case for a ban on the sport.".

In 2025, Valley trainer Mike Burton steered Droopys Aladdin through to the quarter final of the 2025 English Greyhound Derby.

== Present racing ==
Racing usually takes place on Tuesday and Wednesday afternoons, Thursday evenings and Sunday mornings. Major competitions are held regularly and licensed bookmakers attended every meeting. The venue is popular with families with free entry for children. Greyhound owners and trainers encouraged children to interact with the greyhounds after they had raced.

== Track records ==
Current

Metres	Greyhound	Time	Date
260	Tromora Rain	15.79	4 April 2024
460	Ballydorgan Gema	28.09	3 November 2023
645	Dubai Kid	40.57	21 January 2024

Former

Metres	Greyhound	Time	Date
260	Freddo	16.23	10 November 2023

== Gallery ==
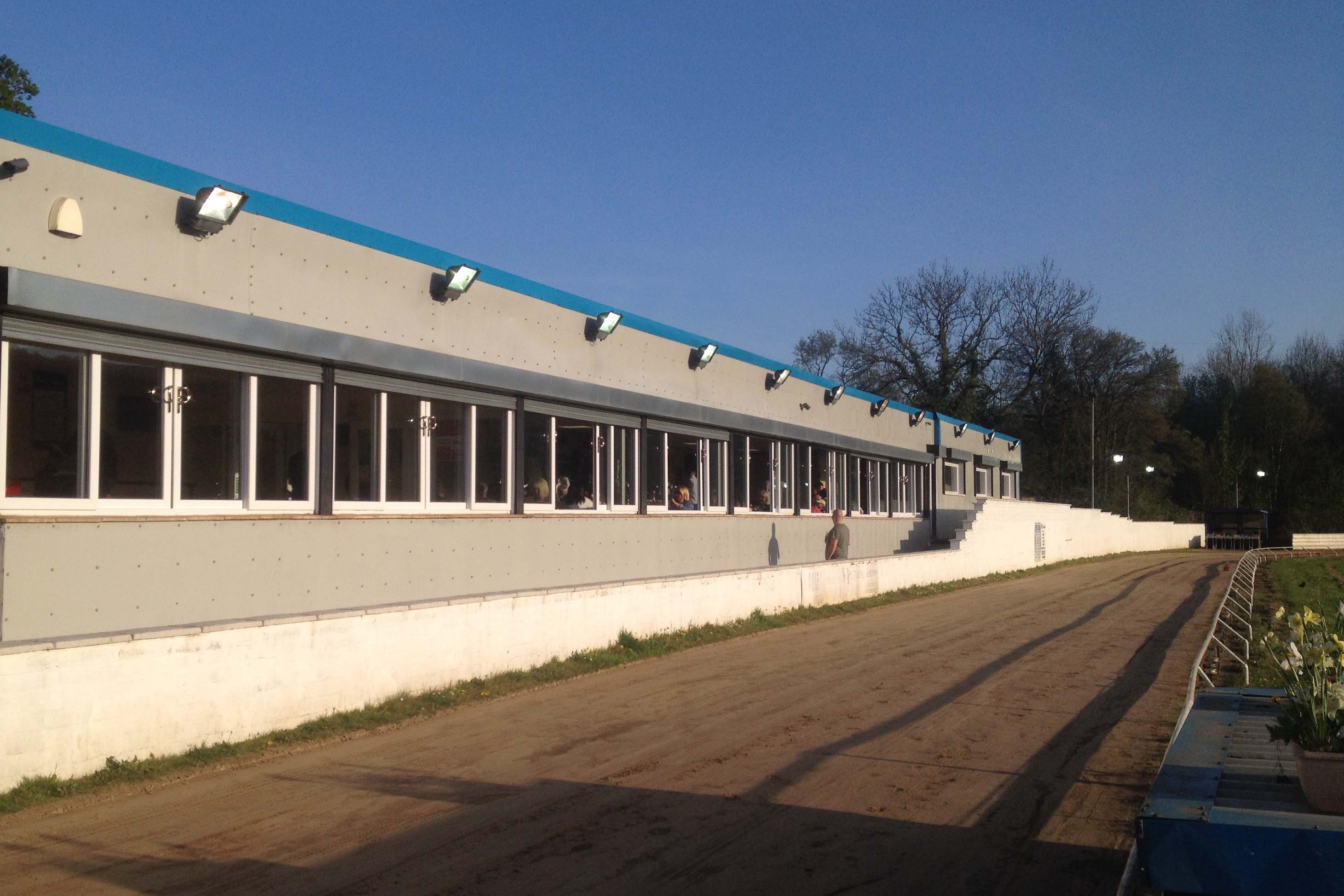

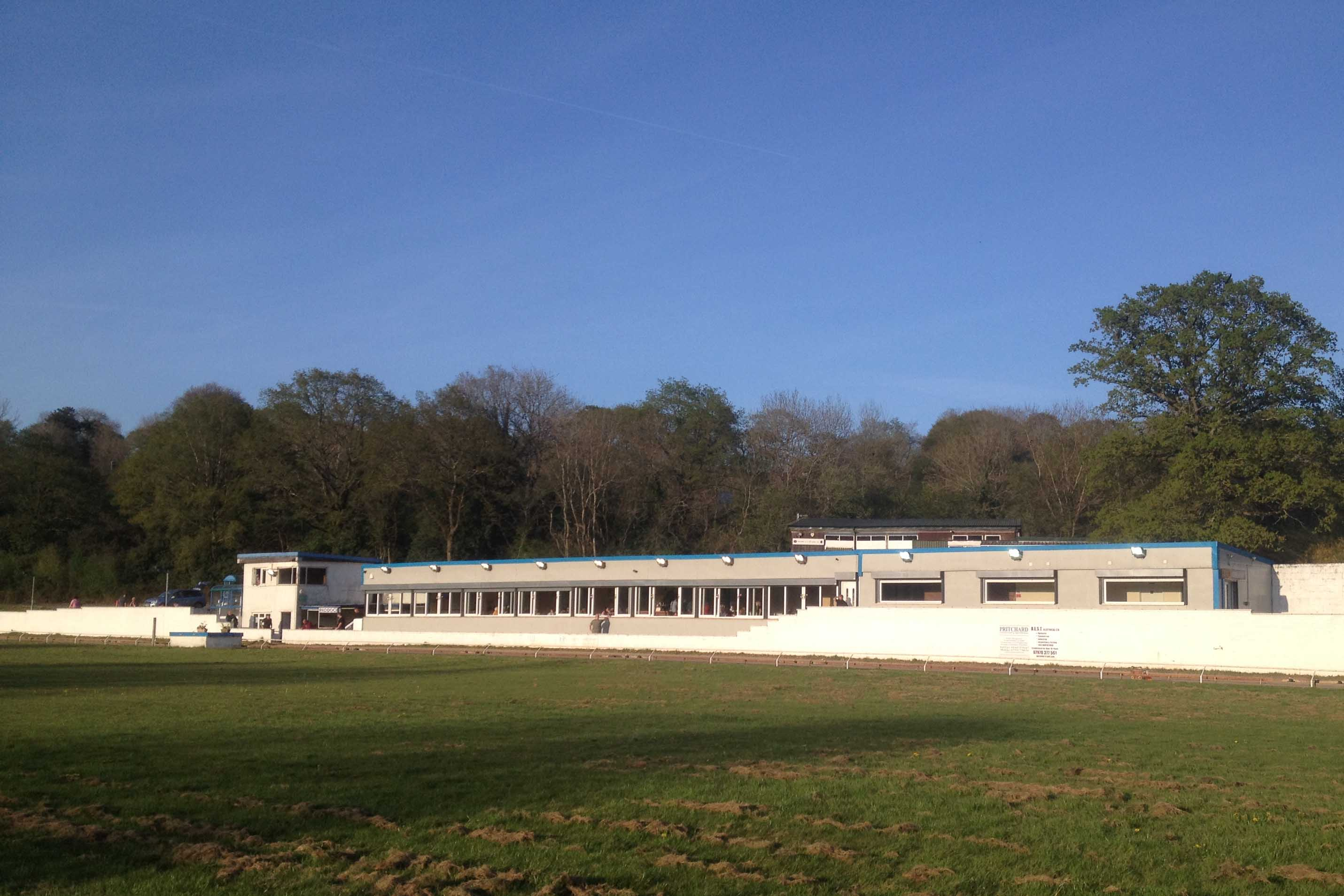

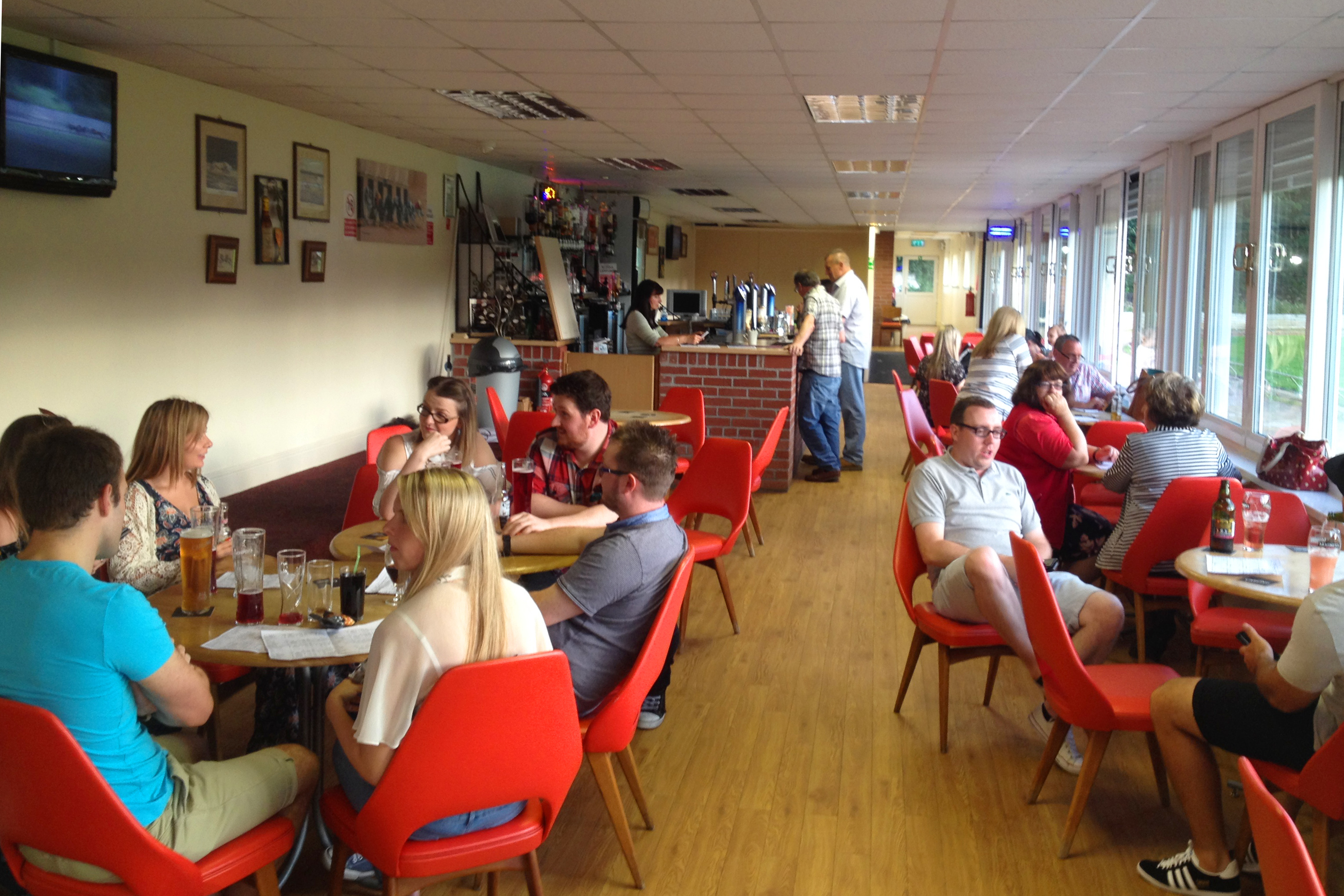

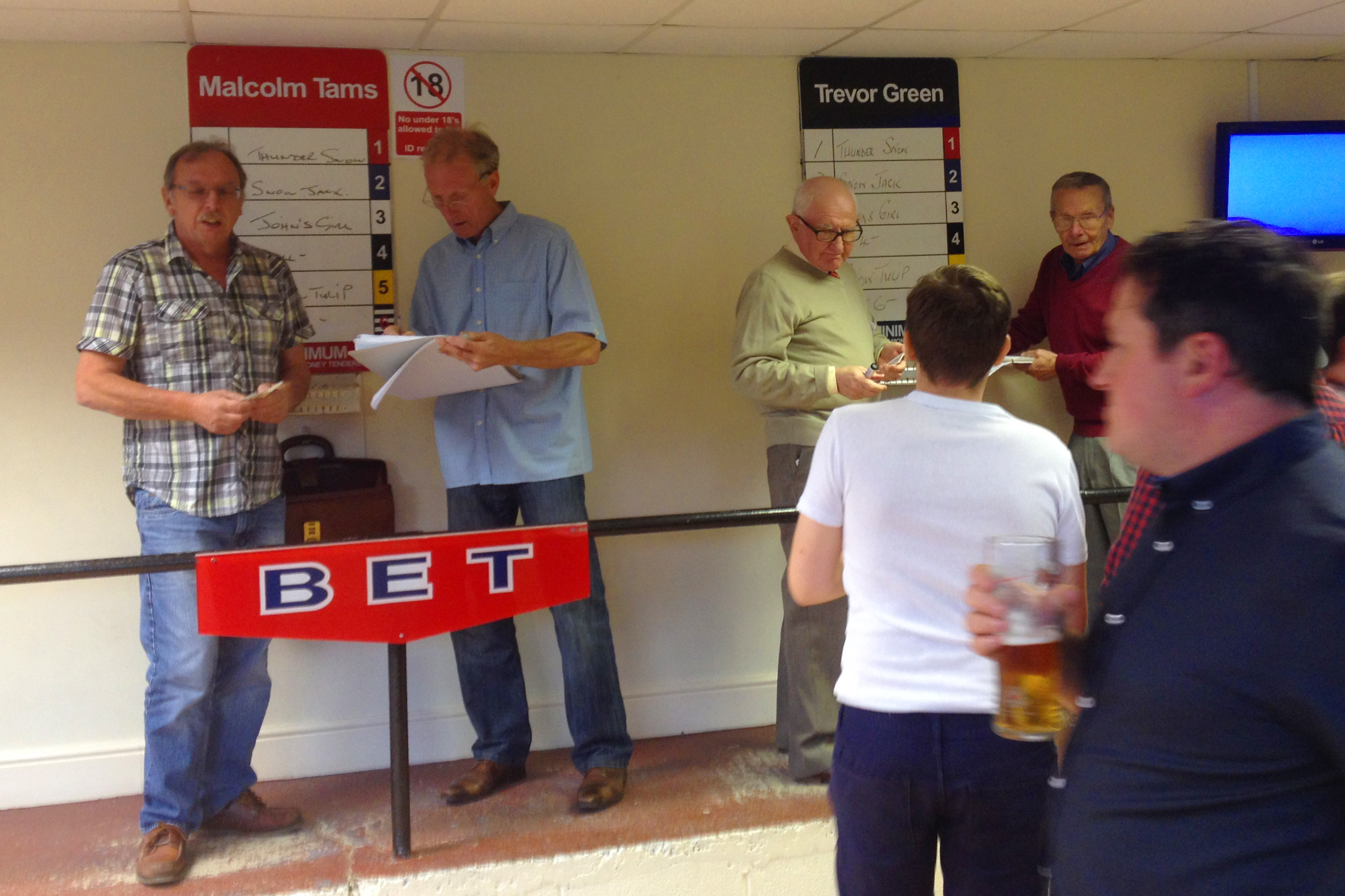

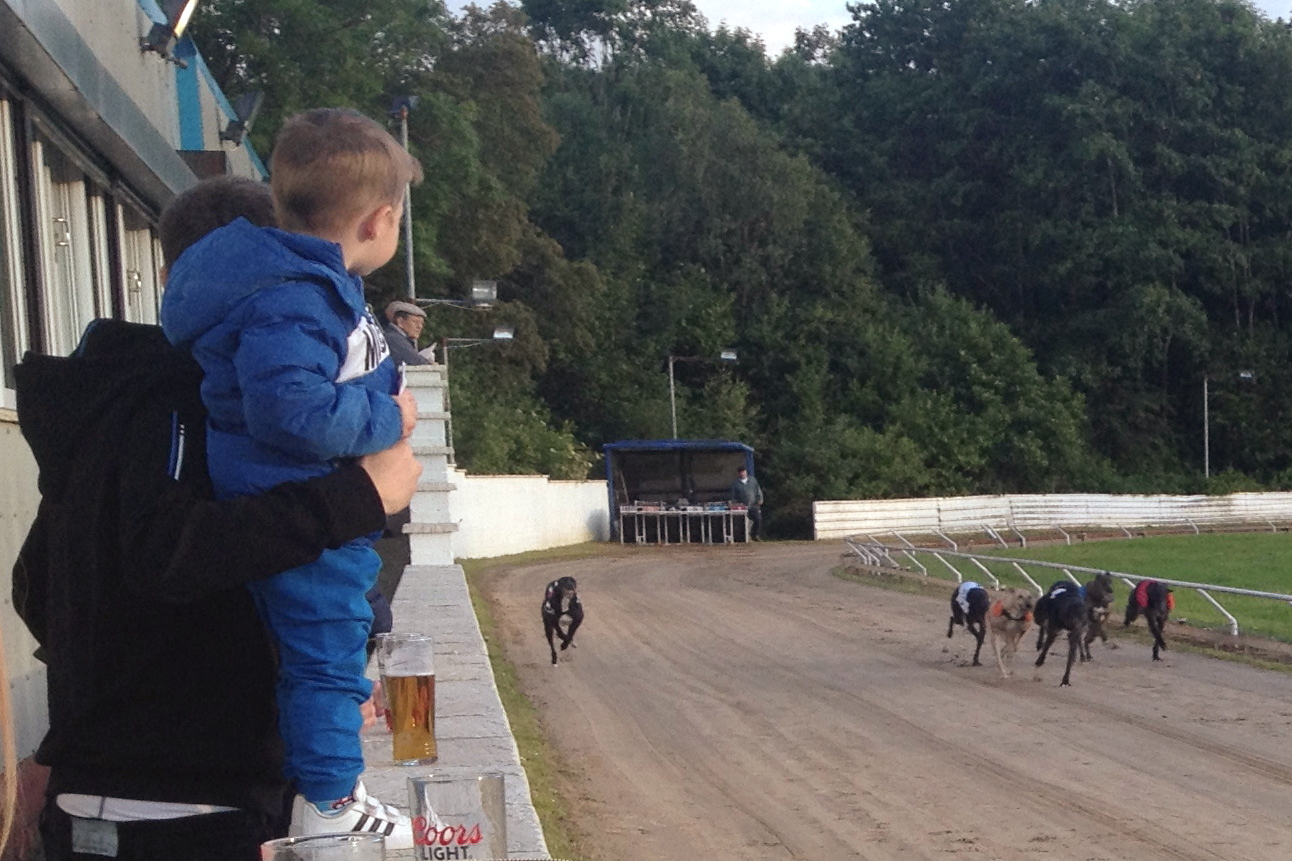

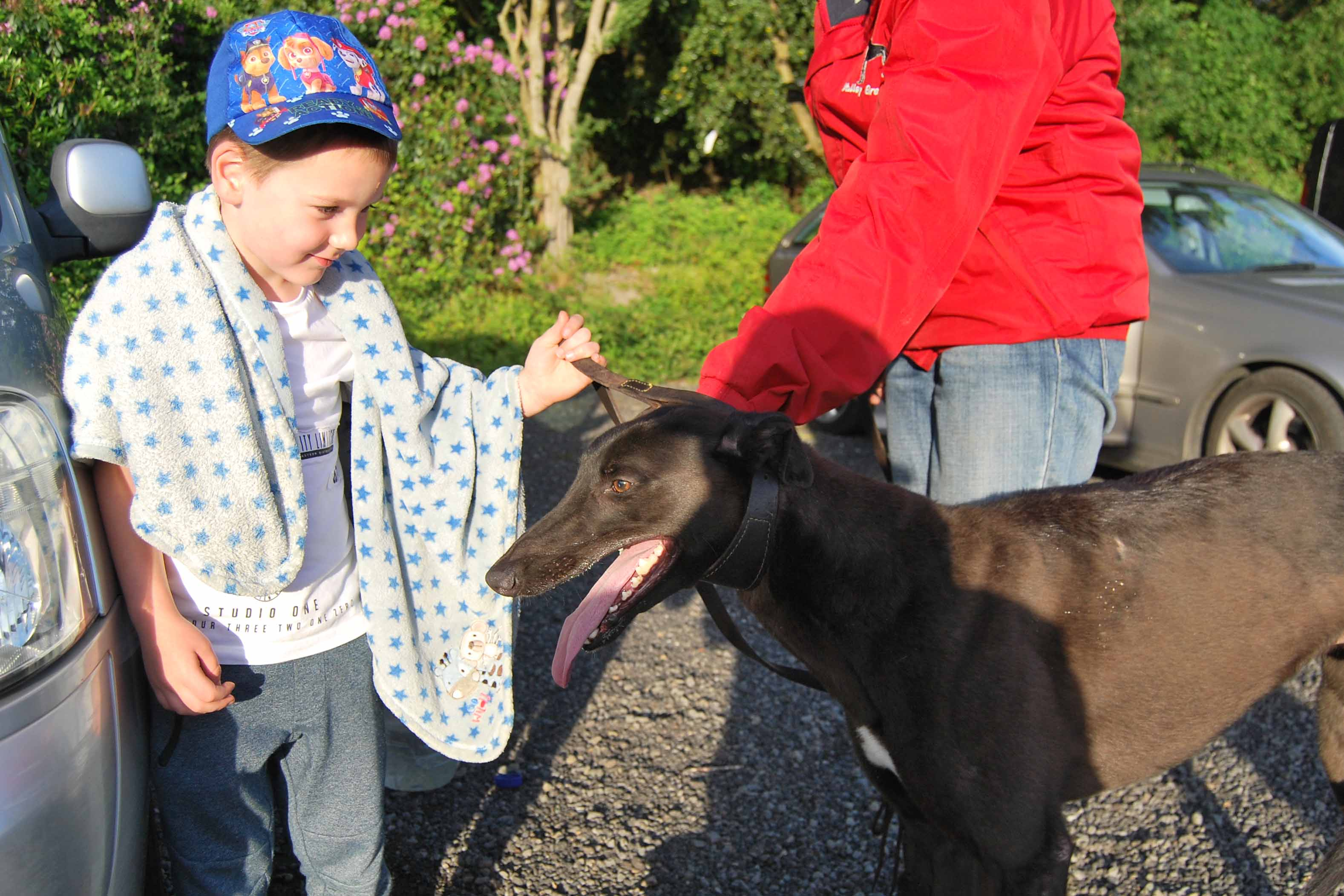
