= Golden Sprint =

Greyhound racing competition

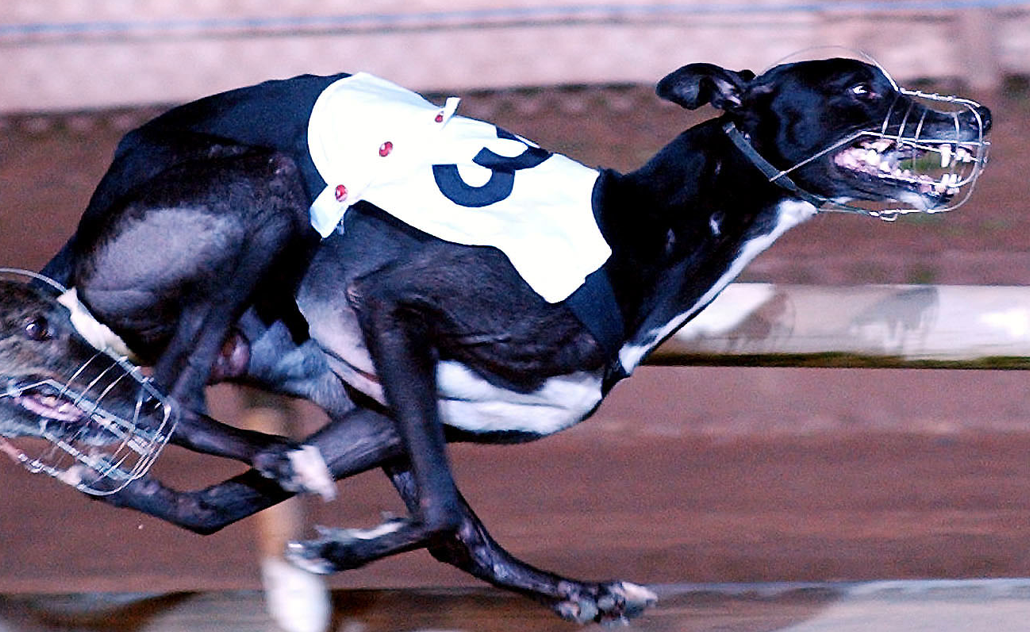
- Kinda Magic winner in 2001 & 2002
- Class: Category 1
- Location: Romford Stadium
- Inaugurated: 1987
- Sponsor: Coral

Race information
- Distance: 400 metres
- Surface: Sand
- Purse: £10,000 (winner)

The Golden Sprint is a greyhound racing competition held annually at Romford Greyhound Stadium. It was inaugurated in 1987.

== Venues & distances ==
- 1987–present (Romford 400m)

== Sponsors ==
- 1988–1993 (Coral)
- 1994–1994 (Bailey Racing)
- 2002–2006 (Coral)
- 2007–2013 (The Millennium Stand Bookmakers)
- 2014–2024 (Coral)

== Past winners ==
Year	Winner	Breeding	Trainer	Time	SP	Notes/Ref
1987	Aulton Henri	Aulton Villa – Handsome Miss	Norah McEllistrim (Wimbledon)	24.27	6/1	
1988	Minor Misfit	Lindas Champion – Minor Coddle	Gary Baggs (Walthamstow)	24.20	7/2	
1989	River Loch	Roisins Boy – Welcome Lady	Linda Mullins (Romford)	24.23	3/1	
1990	Demesne Chance	Kyle Jack – Anti Everything	Gunner Smith (Hove)	24.56	9/4f	
1991	Murlens Lord	Manorville Magic – Murlens Peach	Kenny Linzell (Romford)	24.99	3/1	
1992	Dealing Screen	Moral Support – Barbary Doll	Kenny Linzell (Romford)	24.90	9/4jf	
1993	Fast Copper	Ballyard Hoffman – Parkswood Magpie	John Copplestone (Reading)	24.43	5-4f	
1994	Witches Dean	Lyons Dean – Witches Betty	Peter Rich (Romford)	24.28	4/1	
1995	Countrywide Cub	Satharn Beo – Free Fancy	John Coleman (Walthamstow)	24.44	2/1f	
1996	Boys Dream	Skelligs Tiger – Carrowkeal Tracy	Terry Kibble (Bristol)	24.39	8/1	
1997	King Oscar	Polnoon Chief – Keston Queen	Charlie Lister (Private)	24.33	4/5f	
1998	Glenquin Blackie	Some Whisper – Hillan Blue	Geoff De Mulder (Private)	24.09	7/4f	
1999	Spring Raider	Slaneyside Hare – Spring Season	James Brennan (Private)	24.28	5/2	
2000	El Boss	Pepes Dilemma – Bid You Joy	Linda Mullins (Walthamstow)	24.28	11/4f	
2001	Kinda Magic	Deep Decision - Enchantment	Linda Jones (Walthamstow)	24.18	2/1	
2002	Kinda Magic	Deep Decision - Enchantment	Linda Jones (Walthamstow)	24.29	11/10f	
2003	Tims Crow	Lenson Lad – Churchtown Spice	Peter Rich (Romford)	24.29	2/1	
2004	Shes Our Star	Knockeevan Star – Shadow Flash	Paul Young (Romford)	24.34	10/1	
2005	Droopys Sammer	Droopys Vieri – Droopys Nellie	Paul Young (Romford)	24.46	4/1	
2006	Driving Up Henry	Petes Boss – Ferrypoint Flame	Paul Sallis (Hall Green)	24.99	20/1	
2007	Black Taxi	Larkhill Jo – Lagile Ash	John Mullins (Walthamstow)	24.91	5/1	
2008	Blindin Bell	Droopys Vieri – Going Native	David Mullins (Romford)	24.22	6/4jf	
2009	Glenroe Ginger	Crash – Farloe Charity	Barrie Draper (Sheffield)	23.59	6/4f	
2010	Ardbeg Mentor	Daves Mentor – Farantane Sinead	Ken Tester (Hove)	23.56	4/1	Track record
2011	Step On Brett	Brett Lee – Step Lightly	Elaine Parker (Sheffield)	24.40	6/1	
2012	Blonde Snapper	Droopys Kewell – Rough Charley	Mark Wallis (Yarmouth)	23.89	3/1	
2013	Farloe Barracuda	Droopys Scolari - Youraisemeup	Barrie Draper (Sheffield)	23.83	9/4f	
2014	Lough Messi	Droopys Vieri – Lough Carra	Maxine Locke (Romford)	23.95	11/8f	
2015	You Never Listen	Makeshift - Swift Erin	Jim Reynolds (Romford)	23.61	7/4f	
2016	Droopys Story	Central City – Droopys Solange	Paul Young (Romford)	24.13	5/2f	
2017	Clondoty Alex	Razldazl Jayfkay – Castlehill Alex	Mark Wallis (Towcester)	24.09	6/4f	
2018	Forest Chunk	Tullymurry Act – Forest May	Kevin Hutton (Towcester)	24.03	11/10f	
2019	Union Jack	Droopys Scolari – Ilikeyou	Jean Liles (Central Park)	24.04	4/1	
2020	Goldies Hoddle	Droopys Sydney – Silver Dollar	Patrick Janssens (Central Park)	23.86	3/1	
2021	Bockos Jon Jo	Droopys Jet – Moanteen Beauty	Patrick Janssens (Towcester)	23.77	10/11f	
2022	Rail Mccoy	Ballymac Best – Swift Vicki	Mark Wallis (Henlow)	24.13	5/1	
2023	Droopys Good	Ballybough Mike – Droopys Cuckoo	Patrick Janssens (Towcester)	23.92	11/2	
2024	Front Alice	Droopys Sydney – Droopys Alice	Kevin Proctor (Harlow)	23.86	14/1	
2025	Union Rebel	Droopys Sydney – Union Secret	Mark Wallis (Private)	23.57	7/4f	
