= 2025 Irish Greyhound Derby =

Annual sporting event in Ireland

2025 Boylesports Irish Greyhound Derby
- Location: Shelbourne Park
- Start date: Friday 22 August
- End date: Saturday 27 September
- Competitors: 144
- Total prize money: €300,000 (winner €125,000)

The 2025 Boylesports Irish Greyhound Derby took place during August and September 2025, with the final being held on 27 September at Shelbourne Park. The competition was sponsored by BoyleSports and the prize money purse was €300,000, of which €125,000 went to the winner.

The competition returned to its traditional late Summer slot following major refurbishment of Shelbourne Park in 2024.

Trainer Graham Holland claimed a record fifth Irish Derby after Cheap Sandwiches won the event at odds of 4/5.

== Details and ante-post betting ==
The first round was held on 22 and 23 August, second round on 29 and 30 August, third round on 6 September, quarter finals on 13 September and semi finals on 20 September.

Ante-post betting saw defending champion Bockos Diamond installed as 9/2 favourite, followed by a kennel mate and dual English/Irish Derby finalist at 12/1. Other leading contenders were Callaway Knegare at 12/1, Ballinabola Joe and Droopys Kathleen at 16/1 and 2004 English Derby champion De Lahdedah and Faypoint Ranger at 20/1.

== Quarter finals ==
Heat 1 (13 Sep)
Pos	Name	SP	Time
1st	Cheap Sandwiches	4/7f	29.27
2nd	Droopys Deploy	14/1	29.76
3rd	Callaway Five	25/1	29.79
4th	Unanimous Leo	9/2	29.80
5th	Pricless Romeo	11/1	30.05
6th	Lennies Dream	9/2	30.89

Heat 2 (13 Sep)
Pos	Name	SP	Time
1st	Magical Mag	6/4f	29.69
2nd	Happy Jet	11/1	29.93
3rd	Ballymac Stud	9/4	30.07
4th	Blastoff Heffo	12/1	30.09
5th	Shanahee Boomer	5/2	30.12
6th	Tarsna Maasai	N/R	

Heat 3 (13 Sep)
Pos	Name	SP	Time
1st	Proper Heiress	4/7f	29.78
2nd	Glengar Silent	7/1	29.85
3rd	Singalong Curly	5/1	30.02
4th	Magical Sapphire	12/1	30.03
5th	Cheque For Cash	13/2	30.21
6th	Phoenix Memphis	20/1	30.63

Heat 4 (13 Sep)
Pos	Name	SP	Time
1st	Ballyhooly Bruno	8/1	29.69
2nd	Oreo Ollie	8/1	29.83
3rd	Barefoot on Song	6/1	29.97
4th	Coosane Pickles	11/2	30.18
5th	Rural Pest	5/2	30.21
6th	De Lahdedah	13/8f	30.46

== Semi finals ==
First semi final (29 Sep)
Pos	Name of Greyhound	SP	Time	Trainer
1st	Cheap Sandwiches	1/2f	29.14	Graham Holland
2nd	Oreo Ollie	22/1	30.01	Jack Kennelly
3rd	Barefoot on Song	33/1	30.02	Paul Hennessy
4th	Proper Heiress	3/1	30.27	Mark Wallis
5th	Singalong Curly	14/1	30.37	Pat Buckley
6th	Ballymac Stud	7/1	30.38	Liam Dowling

Second semi final (20 Sep)
Pos	Name of Greyhound	SP	Time	Trainer
1st	Glengar Silent	15/8	29.26	Pat Buckley
2nd	Droopys Deploy	6/1	29.40	Robert G.Gleeson
3rd	Magical Mag	5/4f	29.47	Patrick Guilfoyle
4th	Ballyhooly Bruno	7/1	29.61	Tom O'Neill
5th	Callaway Five	16/1	29.89	Owen McKenna
6th	Happy Jet	14/1	30.13	Pat Buckley

== Final ==
At Shelbourne Park (over 550 yards):

Position	Greyhound	Breeding	Trap	Sectional	SP	Time (sec)	Comment	Trainer
1st	Cheap Sandwiches	Burgess Bucks – Hearthill Josie	5	3.47	4/5f	29.37	Led2, Drew Clear	Graham Holland
2nd	Barefoot on Song	Grangeview Ten – Jaytee Osprey	3	3.40	40/1	29.58	EP, Led1-2	Paul Hennessy
3rd	Glengar Silent	Droopys Sydney – Singalong Sally	4	3.54	11/2	29.86	LckEP, Stayed On	Pat Buckley
4th	Proper Heiress	Droopys Sydney – Powerful Mush	1	3.51	7/2	30.00	EvAw, Clear Run	Mark Wallis
5th	Droopys Deploy	Malachi – Droopys Charm	6	3.57	12/1	30.21	SAw, BBlk1	Robert G.Gleeson
6th	Magical Mag	Ballymac Cashout – Mystical Luna	2	3.45	10/1	00.00	KO1	Patrick Guilfoyle

=== Distances ===
3, 4, 2, 3, Dis

(0.07 sec = one length)

== Competition report ==
The second round started without Callaway Knegare and Faypoint Ranger after both were knocked out at the first stage. Bombay Pat posted 29.17 to record the fastest time in the second round, as he had done in the first round. Bockos Diamond made amends for a first round defeat by claiming his heat in 29.40 and Cheap Sandwiches won in 29.49. However, the third round started deflated with the withdrawal from the competition of Bockos Diamond and this was followed by the surprise eliminations of Ballinabola Joe and Bombay Pat. The race of the night went to Proper Heiress who defeated Cheap Sandwiches by a length.

In the quarter-finals, Cheap Sandwiches and Proper Heiress consolidated their positions as the new favourites with 29.27 and 29.78 successes respectively, the latter continuing his unbeaten run. The other two heats went to Magical Mag and Ballyhooly Bruno.

The semi-final round was dominated by the disqualification of Oreo Ollie who interfered with Barefoot On Song for second place. The heat was easily won by Cheap Sandwiches who was now considered a near certainty for the title. Proper Heiress had a stroke of luck by taking the last berth for the final. The second heat was won by Glengar Silent.

== See also ==
- 2025 in UK and Ireland greyhound racing
