= 2025 English Greyhound Derby =

UK greyhound competition

- Location: Towcester Greyhound Stadium
- Start date: 8 May
- End date: 14 June
- Total prize money: £235,000 (final) £175,000 (winner)

The 2025 Greyhound Derby sponsored by Star Sports/TRC, took place during May and June 2025, with the final being held on 14 June 2025 at Towcester Greyhound Stadium.

Droopys Plunge won the Derby for trainer Patrick Janssens. The black dog was a surprise 10/1 shot and foiled Irish Derby champion Bockos Diamond from winning a dual Derby and De Lahdedah from retaining his Derby title. The greyhound was owned by The-three-tall-men-syndicate and bred by Sean Dunphy. The winner received £175,000.

== Format and ante-post betting ==
It was the seventh time that the event was held at Towcester after previously being run there in 2017 to 2018 and 2021 to 2024. The dates of the competition were - first round 8, 9 & 10 May, second round 16 & 17 May, third round 24 May, quarter finals 31 May, semi-finals 7 June. A series of trial stakes were held as usual before the event.

A total number of 179 entries were received. In the early ante-post betting, Bockos Diamond, the impressive Irish Derby champion was a very short 4/1 favourite, followed by a group behind containing March on Freddie 12/1, Proper Heiress 12/1, Bombay Pat 14/1 and Wicky Ned 16/1. Two greyhounds that were expected to go well were defending champion De Lahdedah 33/1 and dual Derby finalist Boylesports Bob 40/1. King Memphis, who was unfortunate in the 2024 campaign was not entered due to injury.

== Quarter finals ==
Heat 1 (31 May, £1,000)
Pos	Name	SP	Time
1st	Cheap Sandwiches	8/11f	28.67
2nd	Droopys Bookem	8/1	28.78
3rd	Sole Mio	3/1	28.86
4th	March On Freddie	12/1	29.00
5th	Singalong Molly	8/1	29.49
6th	Droopys Aladdin	18/1	29.67

Heat 2 (31 May, £1,000)
Pos	Name	SP	Time
1st	De Lahdedah	8/15f	28.81
2nd	Churchfield Syd	5/1	28.82
3rd	No Better Feelin	28/1	28.92
4th	Romeo Empire	8/1	28.96
5th	Tiffield Tarquin	7/1	29.02
6th	Hello Diego	10/1	29.16

Heat 3 (31 May, £1,000)
Pos	Name	SP	Time
1st	Dynamic Force	3/1	28.66
2nd	Bombay Pat	6/5f	28.87
3rd	Prince Naseem	8/1	29.09
4th	Faypoint Harvey	9/4	29.23
5th	One Slick Jamie	40/1	29.31
6th	Newinn Benni	25/1	29.38

Heat 4 (31 May, £1,000)
Pos	Name	SP	Time
1st	Slick Sentinel	14/1	28.87
2nd	Droopys Plunge	6/1	28.88
3rd	Bockos Diamond	8/13f	28.89
4th	Keefil Maverick	28/1	29.21
5th	Droopys Trade	7/1	29.30
6th	Bubbly Charger	4/1	29.44

== Semi finals ==
First Semi-final (7 June, £2,500)
Pos	Name of Greyhound	SP	Time	Trainer
1st	De Lahdedah	5/2f	28.62	Dowling
2nd	Sole Mio	11/4	28.67	Cronin
3rd	Bombay Pat	9/2	28.94	Holland
4th	Droopys Bookem	7/1	29.00	Heilbron
5th	Slick Sentinel	7/1	29.04	Janssens
6th	Churchfield Syd	4/1	29.31	Rees

Second Semi-final (7 June, £2,500)
Pos	Name of Greyhound	SP	Time	Trainer
1st	Bockos Diamond	6/4f	28.51	Holland
2nd	Cheap Sandwiches	5/2	28.65	Holland
3rd	Droopys Plunge	6/1	28.97	Janssens
4th	No Better Feelin	33/1	29.28	Driver
5th	Prince Naseem	25/1	29.37	Locke
6th	Dynamic Force	5/2	00.00	Hennessy

== Competition review ==
First round

Fastest on night one was Graham Holland's Val Tashadelek in 28.81, while kennelmate and competition favourite Bockos Diamond won in a moderate 29.23 and Wicky Ned was eliminated atter falling. Night two saw champion De Lahdedah record a fast 28.50 success, while March on Freddie had to settle for second place behind Sole Mio. The final heats resulted in Irish domination with Lennies Desire recording 28.58, Ballinabola Joe 28.62 and Droopys Plunge 28.64.

Second round

Ballinabola Joe defeated De Lahdedah in heat2, March on Freddie returned to winning ways but Proper Heiress was a shock elimination. During the second night of heats Bombay Pat came good with a 28.53 win and then Bockos Diamond won in 28.51 to reassure ante-post backers and remain competition favourite.

Third round

Three greyhounds remained unbeaten after the third round. They were Bockos Diamond, Sole Mio and Droopys Trade. De Lahdedah won his heat and despite being defending champion had been 33/1 antepost. Trainers Patrick Janssens and Graham Holland each steered four through to the quarter finals. Janssens had two winners with Slick Sentinel and Droopys Trade but the other five races went to the Irish, with the other heat going to the Welsh with Mike Burton's Droopys Aladdin.

Quarter finals

Cheap Sandwiches won a very tough first heat on a fast track recording 28.67. Holland's black dog was followed home by Droopys Bookem and the previously unbeaten Sole Mio. March on Freddie, Singalong Molly and Droopys Aladdin were all eliminated. Next up was champion De Lahdedah and he won again after catching leader Churcfield Syd on the line, with outsider No Better Feelin taking third. The third qualifier went to Dynamic Force in 28.66 with Bombay Pat and Prince Nassem taking the places. The final heat resulted in a blanket finish with a three-way photo finish between Slick Sentinel, Droopys Plunge and Bockos Diamond. The decision went to the former and with it Bockos Diamond lost his unbeaten record.

Semi finals

After the completion of semi-finals the possibility that history could be written was still a possibility because defending champion De Lahdedah and wonder dog Bockos Diamond won their respective races. De Lahdedah caught long time leader Sole Mio in the first heat, with Bombay Pat third. Bockos Diamond defeated kennelmate Cheap Sandwiches in heat two, with the only British qualifier Droopys Plunge taking third.

== Final result ==
At Towcester (over 500 metres): 14 June, Winner £175,000

Pos	Name of Greyhound	Breeding	Trap	Sectional	Race comment	SP	Time (sec)	Trainer
1st	Droopys Plunge	Droopys Sydney - Droopys Sweet	1	4.03	Rls,QAw,FinWell,LdRnIn	10/1	28.76	Patrick Janssens
2nd	Bockos Diamond	Dorotas Wildcat - Seaglass Shadow	6	4.05	MidTW,EP,Led3ToRnIn	11/10	28.89	Graham Holland
3rd	De Lahdedah	Lenson Bocko - Ballymac Sarahjo	3	4.07	RlsTMid,Crd1,FinWell	4/1	28.90	Liam Dowling
4th	Cheap Sandwiches	Burgess Bucks - Hearthill Josie	5	4.08	Wide,EP	5/1	28.91	Graham Holland
5th	Sole Mio	Coolavanny Hoffa - Palermo	2	4.09	RlsTMid,SAw,Crd1	6/1	28.92	Peter Cronin
6th	Bombay Pat	Pestana - Clear Mountain	4	4.05	MidTW,EP,Led1To3	20/1	28.98	Graham Holland

=== Final distances ===
1½, short head, short head, short head, ½ (lengths) 0.08 sec = one length

=== Final report ===
Droopys Plunge running from trap 1 for the first time in the competition took advantage of the draw and finished strongly and unhindered on the rails to catch the pack and take the lead on the run-in. The hot favourite Bockos Diamond was unable to shake off kennelmate Bombay Pat as the pair led for most of the race and this arguably led to the opportunity for Droopys Plunge to catch them. Cheap Sandwiches was also prominent throughout, while De Lahdedah's chances were ended when Sole Mio took the inside line from him at the first bend. All six runners finished together in one of the closest race finishes in recent times, with one length between 2nd and 6th place.

== See also ==
- 2025 in UK and Ireland greyhound racing
