= Monmore Puppy Derby =

British greyhound racing competition

- Class: Category 1
- Location: Monmore Green Stadium
- Inaugurated: 1943
- Sponsor: Premier Greyhound Racing

Race information
- Distance: 480 metres
- Surface: Sand
- Qualification: Juveniles only (15–24 months old)
- Purse: £20,000 (winner)

The Monmore Puppy Derby also known as the Premier Greyhound Racing Puppy Derby for sponsorship purposes, is a greyhound competition held at Monmore Green Stadium. It was inaugurated in 1943 and is also known as the Midland Puppy Championship, the Midland Puppy Derby and the Ladbrokes Puppy Derby.

In 1963, the event switched to Willenhall Greyhound Stadium, following the fire that destroyed the main stand and restaurant at Monmore.

In 2022, the event was sponsored by Premier Greyhound Racing and £20,000 was awarded to the winner, which was double the amount that the traditional and long running competition English Puppy Derby offered.

== Venues ==
- 1943–2024 (Monmore, 525y/480m)
- 1963–1963 (Willenhall, 400y)
- 1978–1983 (not held)

== Sponsors ==
- 1984–1988 (Courage Brewery)
- 1989–1999 (Carlsberg Group)
- 2002–2021 (Ladbrokes)
- 2022–2025 (Premier Greyhound Racing)

== Past winners ==
Year	Winner	Breeding	Trainer	Time (sec)	SP	Notes/ref
1943	Model Dasher	Model Whiskey – Dashing Comet	Tom Baldwin (Perry Barr)	30.20	9/4f	
1944	Country Life	Border Mutton – Mah Jong	Dr Dennis O'Brien (Private)	30.81	6/1	
1945	Bally Rambler	Castledown Lad – Lucky Rattle	G Smith - (Reading)	29.26	4/1	
1946	Still Dreaming		J Yarwood (Wolverhampton)	30.98	6/1	
1947	Mad Birthday	Mad Tanist–Bellas Bloom	Stan Biss (Clapton)	29.12	6/4f	
1948	Saft Alex	Mad Tanist - Fair Light	Jack Toseland (Perry Barr)	28.77	2/1	
1949	Red Wind	Dysertmore Prince – Light Biddy	Frank Davis (Private)	29.20	8/15f	
1951	Outcast Bally	Ballybeg Surprise – Outcast Queen	Ron Chamberlain (Private)	30.29	4/7f	
1954	Wag Winder	Slaney Record – Via Tanist	Ron Chamberlain (Private)	28.72	7/4f	
1955	Devon Love		Ron Chamberlain (Private)	28.47	11/4f	
1956	Five Up	Nine Up – Duplicate	Ron Chamberlain (Private)	28.89	7/1	
1957	Glittering Sprig	Glittering Look – Nancys Sprig	Tom Perry (Private)	28.80	4/1	
1958	Man From Chicago	Man of Pleasure – I.R.A	Tom Baldwin (Perry Barr)	28.44	6/1	
1959	Gorey Airways	Imperial Airways – GeffsLinnett	Jimmy Jowett (Clapton)	28.68	5/4f	
1960	Shannon Swan	Man of Pleasure – Shannon Flower	Harry Bamford (Private)	30.60	6/1	
1961	Stand Inside	Tanyard Champion – CoolickSterope	Mayor Baker (Wolverhampton)	30.03		
1962	Lucky Joan II	Recorded Course-Astraea	John Bassett (Clapton)	28.10		
1963	Susies Son	Beaurepaire Reject – Gils Susie	Jimmy Quinn (Perry Barr)	23.01		
1964	Dodos Luck	Careless Look – Barrack Street There	J Broadbent (Bradford)	29.72	7-2	
1965	Sly Blakeney	Prairie Flash – Balinascorney	Jim Irving (Private)	29.87		
1966	Billy The Mink	Buffalo Bill – Have A Mink	B. Ellis (Hall Green)	29.46		
1967	Hack Up Georgie	Knock Hill Chieftain – Hack up Millie	Les Brown (Wolverhampton)	29.69		
1968	Carry On Boro		John Perrin (Private)	30.02		
1969	Down The Boola	Printers Prince – Im Tiny	Brian Jay (Perry Barr)	29.47	7/2	
1970	Crefogue Flash	Newdown Heather – Duffry Flash	Stan Mitchell Belle Vue	29.79	2/1	
1972	Westmead Hall	Ivy Hall Jewel – Bresheen Umm	Natalie Savva (Private)	29.92	3/1	
1973	Laurdella Fun	Supreme Fun – Octum	Norman Oliver (Brough Park)	30.01		
1976	Carhumore Speech	Free Speech – Pat's Glory	Len White (Private)	28.04		
1977	Westmead Velvet	Fionntra Frolic – Westmead Damson	Natalie Savva (Bletchley)	29.66		
1984	Fearless Sarah	Desert Pilot – Lasting Fame	Geoff De Mulder (Private)	28.40	8/1	
1985	Keeper Tom	Brilliant Chimes – Brocks Delight	Gary Baggs (Ramsgate)	28.54	2/1jf	
1986	Fiddlers Run	Citizen Supreme – Heart of Glass	Gary Baggs (Ramsgate)	28.60	7/4	
1987	Quarrymount Rio	Brilliant Chimes – Quarrymount Iris	Geoff De Mulder (Oxford)	28.29	4/11f	
1988	Hush It Up	Cronins Bar – Thoar Ballylee	Kenny Linzell (Walthamstow)	28.38	7/4f	
1989	Daisys Spirit	Oran Jack – Duffers Daisy	Geoff De Mulder (Norton Canes)	29.66	1/2f	
1990	One For Lloyd	Brief Candle – One For Barrie	William Davies (Swindon)	29.97	20/1	
1991	Mineola Ace	Fearless Mac – Mineola Athena	Theo Mentzis (Milton Keynes)	30.03	3/1	
1992	Home Late	My Tallyho Two – Cranbrook Girl	Geoff De Mulder (Private)	29.87	6/1	
1993	Lyons Double	Castleyons Gem – Lyons Lady	Donna Pickett (Private)	29.46	3/1	
1994	Mr Tan	Murlens Slippy – Without Equal	Dave Catchpole (Private)	30.06	6/1	
1995	Staplers Jo	Dempsey Duke – Perfect Rhythm	Nick Savva (Walthamstow)	29.72	5/2	
1996	Eleets Noir Bill	Slaneyside Hare – Killeenagh Lily	Mark Barlow (Hall Green)	29.92	7/4	
1997	Elliots Gift	Droopys Sandy – Kora	Nikki Chambers (Nottingham)	27.40	6/1	
1998	Eleets Noir Boy	Slaneyside Hare – Killeenagh Lily	John Coxon (Monmore)	28.55	7/1	
1999	Active Jack	Come on Ranger – Active Touch	Paul Walden (Oxford)	28.53	7/1	
2000	Rio Riccardo	Trade Official – Kylies Quest	Daniel Riordan (Private)	28.60	11/10f	
2001	Micks Best Hero	Top Honcho – Micks Best Girl	Brian Clemenson (Hove)	28.42	4/6f	
2002	Droopys Hewitt	Top Honcho – Droopys Cheryl	Nick Savva (Private)	28.74	8/-1	
2003	Knock Split	Split the Bill – Ardfert Miss	Barrie Draper (Sheffield)	28.70	5/4f	
2004	Dairyland Sue	Roanokee - Ciabatta	Pat Rosney (Monmore Green)	28.27	5/4f	
2005	Ballymac Pires	Knockeevan Star – Blonde Returns	Carly Philpott (Coventry)	27.82	3/1	Track record
2006	Ballymac Charley	Daves Mentor – Ballymac Bargain	Carly Philpott (Coventry)	28.41	7/4f	
2007	Blonde Dino	Daves Mentor - Charquest	John Mullins (Private)	28.07	1/1f	
2008	Ardmayle Champ	Doopys Kewell – Fear Beauty	Matt Dartnall (Private)	28.52	3/1	
2009	Bandicoot Tipoki	Crash – Bandicoot Lola	Charlie Lister OBE (Private)	27.96	4/5f	
2010	Ballymac William	Magical Captain – Ballymac Floss	Carly Philpott (Private)	28.16	5/4f	
2011	Droopys Greg	Westmead Diver – Droopys Sporty	Nick Savva (Private)	28.19	4/6f	
2012	Newinn Rocket	Ballymac Maeve – Little Flutter	Pat Rosney (Private)	28.57	6/4f	
2013	Cluxtons Free	Ballymac Maeve – Park Halo	Chris Allsopp (Monmore)	28.53	9/2	
2014	Farloe Nutter	Hondo Black – Wont Be Long	Craig Dawson (Newcastle)	28.18	3/1	
2015	Glenpadden Rock	Ace Hi Rumble – Glen Padden Bay	Barrie Draper (Sheffield)	28.49	7/2	
2016	Castell Henry	Kinloch Brae - Tyrur Alice	Philip Simmonds (Romford)	28.30	10/1	
2017	Forest Con	Ballymac Vic - Droopys Danneel	Seamus Cahill (Hove)	28.22	5/2jf	
2018	Rising Brandy	Taylors Sky – Badminton Girl	Matt Dartnall (Towcester)	27.82	7/4	
2019	Troy Zico	Droopys Jet – Lithuanian Paula	David Mullins (Romford)	28.94	6/1	
2020	Newinn Jacko	Laughil Duke – Coolavanny Pearl	Ernest Gaskin (Private)	28.72	11/4	
2021	Jaguar Macie	Droopys Jet – Droopys Breeze	Graham Rankin (Pelaw Grange)	28.04	9/2	
2022	Deelish Frankie	Ballymac Bolger – Ballymac Belle	Patrick Janssens (Towcester)	28.33	11/4	
2023	Bradys Bullet	Good News – Early Rise	Belinda Green (Hove)	28.19	5/1	
2024	Untold Dollar	Newinn Taylor – Glenegat Mildred	Carol Weatherall (Monmore)	28.21	2/1f	
2025	Headford Dane	Ballymac Bolger – Headford Honey	Maxine Locke (Romford)	28.09	10/3	
