= 2021 English Greyhound Derby =

Dog racing competition

- Location: Towcester Greyhound Stadium
- Start date: 4 June
- End date: 10 July
- Total prize money: £175,000 (winner)

The 2021 Star Sports Greyhound Derby took place during June and July 2021, with the final held on 10 July 2021 at Towcester Greyhound Stadium.

It was the third time that the event was held at Towcester after previously being run there in 2017 and 2018. The event was sponsored by Star Sports and TRC Events and the winners prize has been increased dramatically from £50,000 at Nottingham the previous year to £175,000. The dates of the competition were as follows - first round 4 & 5 June, second round 11 & 12 June, third round 19 June, quarter finals 26 June, semi finals 3 July.

In the very early March ante post betting three greyhounds were quoted at 20–1. Irish pair Knockaboul Syd (the Easter Cup champion), Native Maestro and 2020 UK newcomer of the year Tenpin. On the closing date of 26 May there were 188 entries, with the 2020 Derby favourite Newinn Session heading the betting again at 14–1. The Irish entry (looking for a third successive victory) was extremely strong. Other major names to look out for were defending champion Deerjet Sydney, 2019 Irish Derby champion Lenson Bocko and Kilara Lion.

Thorn Falcon won the Derby for Belgian born Patrick Janssens, thwarting an Irish attempt at a third consecutive success. The greyhound was owned by The Dragons and A Lion Syndicate and bred by Joe Devlin.

== Final result ==
At Towcester (over 500 metres): Winner £175,000

Pos	Name of Greyhound	Breeding	Trap	Sectional	Race comment	SP	Time	Trainer
1st	Thorn Falcon	Dorotas Wildcat - Hey Delilah	6	4.08	Wide,QAw,Ld1	7-2	29.06	Patrick Janssens (Towcester)
2nd	Kilara Lion	Droopys Jet - Kilara Lizzie	4	4.05	Rails,VQAw,LdTo1	22-1	29.36	Patrick Janssens (Towcester)
3rd	Deerjet Sydney	Droopys Sydney - Madgies Wish	2	4.20	RlsTMid,EP,Chl&FcdTCk2	9-4jf	29.53	Pat Buckley (Ireland)
4th	Ballymac Fairone	Ballymac Matt - Ballymac Scala	3	4.32	RlsTMid,Crd1	9-4jf	29.93	Liam Dowling (Ireland)
5th	Ballymac Wild	Vulturi - Ballymac Breeze	5	4.29	RlsTMid,Crd1&4	11-2	30.00	Lian Dowling (Ireland)
6th	Newinn Session	Laughil Duke - Coolavanny Pearl	1	4.26	Rls,FcdTCk3,Crd4	11-2	30.02	Graham Holland (Ireland)

=== Final distances ===
3 3/4, 2, 5, 1, head (lengths) 0.08 sec = one length

=== Final report ===
As the traps opened Kilara Lion was fast out of the traps and was closely followed by kennelmate Thorn Falcon. The latter took the lead at the second bend and slowly drew clear to win the race with relative ease, in a fast time of 29.06. Kilara Lion held on for second place for a 1-2 finish for trainer Patrick Janssens. The defending champion Deerjet Sydney ran a great race after being forced to check at the first bend and being crowded by Newinn Session at the third. It is possible that he may have challenged the winner with a clear run. Newinn Session made a very average start but despite some good back straight pace saw his chances go at the third bend when being forced to check. The two Ballymacs both missed the break and never got into the race following crowding at the first and third bends.

== Quarter finals ==
Heat 1 (26 June, £1,000)
Pos	Name	SP	Time
1st	Deerjet Sydney	8-11f	29.13
2nd	Cold As Ice	11-1	29.27
3rd	Toolmaker Sydney	9-2	29.50
4th	Drumcrow Brent	8-1	29.57
5th	Forest Gold	7-1	29.64
6th	Pacemaker Ted	9-1	29.84

Heat 2 (26 June, £1,000)
Pos	Name	SP	Time
1st	Gaytime Milo	6-1	29.40
2nd	Bockos Belly	15-8f	29.64
3rd	Newinn Session	9-2	29.68
4th	Unlock Unlock	9-4	29.77
5th	Aussie Captain	5-1	30.42
N/R	Faughan Rebel	-	-

Heat 3 (26 June, £1,000)
Pos	Name	SP	Time
1st	Thorn Falcon	5-2jf	29.48
2nd	Ballymac Fairone	5-2jf	29.69
3rd	Kilara Lion	14-1	29.70
4th	All About Ted	9-2	29.88
5th	Minglers Popeye	6-1	30.26
6th	Bubbly Magnum	7-2	30.32

Heat 4 (26 June, £1,000)
Pos	Name	SP	Time
1st	Knocknaboul Syd	7-4f	29.23
2nd	Ballymac Wild	9-2	29.56
3rd	Beach Avenue	7-1	29.74
4th	De Machine	8-1	29.80
5th	Adeles Duke	11-2	29.83
6th	Signet Ace	3-1	29.88

== Semi finals ==
First Semi-final (3 July, £2,500)
Pos	Name of Greyhound	SP	Time	Trainer
1st	Ballymac Fairone	3-1	29.08	Liam Dowling
2nd	Ballymac Wild	5-1	29.19	Liam Dowling
3rd	Deerjet Sydney	1-1f	29.31	Pat Buckley
4th	Toolmaker Sydney	6-1	29.36	Robert G Gleeson
5th	Beach Avenue	14-1	29.41	Paul Hennessy
6th	Cold As Ice	16-1	29.60	James Fenwick

Second Semi-final (3 July, £2,500)
Pos	Name of Greyhound	SP	Time	Trainer
1st	Newinn Session	8-1	29.33	Graham Holland
2nd	Kilara Lion	18-1	29.49	Patrick Janssens
3rd	Thorn Falcon	4-1	29.58	Patrick Janssens
4th	Knocknaboul Syd	10-11f	29.63	Pat Buckley
5th	Bockos Belly	100-30	29.64	Patrick Janssens
6th	Gaytime Milo	14-1	29.88	Graham Holland

== Competition review ==
=== First round ===
The heats commenced on Thursday 3 June and the first of the big names to impress was the stayer Ballymac Kingdom (the Shelbourne 600 champion) who won in 29.54. Newinn Session started his campaign well in heat 7 (29.72) as did Priceless Jet in heat 8 (29.90) but last years finalist Smurfs Machine became the first major casualty. Day two and heats 11-21 saw a good start for Toolmaker Sydney who recorded 29.13 beating Knockaboul Syd by 4 lengths, the time was just five spots outside Wazone Tom's track record. With a new track layout and times only being set since the re-opening of Towcester the record looked certain to go later in the competition. Meanwhile, Glengar Bale won in 29.30, Bockos Belly in 29.32 and Droopys Addition in 29.21. Another big name Ballymac Wild claimed heat 17 (29.53) but the popular Gonzo was eliminated. The final 11 heats took place on Saturday 5 June and Native Maestro was the fastest greyhound of the entire first round, winning in 29.10 but just 3/4 of a length ahead of Unlock Unlock. Lenson Bocko returned to action with a good 29.35 success, defending champion Deerjet Sydney won his heat and there was fast run from Jaguar Macie (29.23). The summary of the first round was few surprise eliminations and an English challenge with an uphill task following a strong showing from the Irish.

=== Second round ===
The first eights heats on Friday 11 June resulted in a few names previously unmentioned becoming possible contenders. Kevin Hutton's Signet Ace recorded 29.16 in beating Jaguar Macie and Liam Dowling's Ballymac Fairone beat Native Maestro in 29.09. In heat 5, Bockos Belly set a new track record of 29.03, which by coincidence was the old record held by Warzone Tom who trailed the winner by six lengths in second place. Bubbly Magnum and Adeles Duke scored second wins and Ballymac Kingdom, Kilara Lion and Knockaboul Syd all squeezed through but Gengar Bale was eliminated. The following evening saw a major shock when both Priceless Jet and Lenson Bocko crashed out of a messy heat 12, a race won well by Roxholme Sheikh in 29.06. Ballymac Wild impressed defeating Toomaker Sydney by three lengths in 29.05 and the defending champion Deerjet Sydney recorded a fast 29.13 in winning heat 15 from Tenpin. Both Thorn Falcon and Hilight Arkle recorded second wins and Newinn Session qualified by finishing second in his heat to Aussie Captain.

=== Third round ===
The opening heat of the third round was arguably the strongest of the night and included Kilara Lion, Newinn Session, Signet Ace and Warzone Tom, with only three to qualify from the six runners it was Signet Ace who remained unbeaten and came out on top in 29.31, from Newinn Session and Kilara Lion, with Warzone Tom missing out by a short head. The second heat went to Ballymac Fairone from Drumcrow Brent and Toolmaker Sydney in 29.53. Forest Gold caused a surprise in heat 3 by defeating Unlock Unlock and Ballymac Wild with Tenpin failing to progress to the quarter-finals. Another surprise in heat 4 saw Aussie Captain bolt from the traps and lead all the way but Native Maestro looked to have picked up an injury and was eliminated. Knocknaboul Syd who had switched to a middle seeding took full advantage of a trap 4 draw in winning heat 5 and in the following race All About Ted recorded the equal fastest time of the night (29.29). Adeles Duke won heat 7 and was only the second greyhound to remain unbeaten. The final heat went to the defending champion Deerjet Sydney who impressed in winning in 29.29. Bockos Belly ran on well to qualify but Hilight Arkle went out.

=== Quarter finals ===
In the first quarter final the defending champion Deejet Sydney justified favouritism with a smart 29.13 run from Cold As Ice and Toolmaker Sydney. Gaytime Milo claimed the second heat from Bockos Belly and Newinn Session before Thorn Falcon won the third heat in 29.48. The final heat went to Knocknaboul Syd with the previously unbeaten Sygent Ace and Adels Duke both failing to progress to the semi-finals.

=== Semi finals ===
With a week available between rounds for the third year running the greyhounds started the semi-finals in peak condition. In the first semi final the Irish made a clean sweep with the Liam Dowling trained pair of Ballymac Fairone and Ballymac Wild first and second. Ballymac Fairone led all the way in a very fast 29.08 and kennelmate Ballymac Wild finished well to take second place overtaking and relegating defending champion Deerjet Sydney into third place. In the second semi the favourite Knocknaboul Syd was forced to check at the first bend and lost his chance as Newinn Session and Kilara Lion maintained the leading places. The 39 kilo dog Thorn Falcon claimed the final qualifying place on the outside.

== See also ==
- 2021 UK & Ireland Greyhound Racing Year
