= Juvenile Classic =

Annual greyhound racing competition, Kerry, Ireland

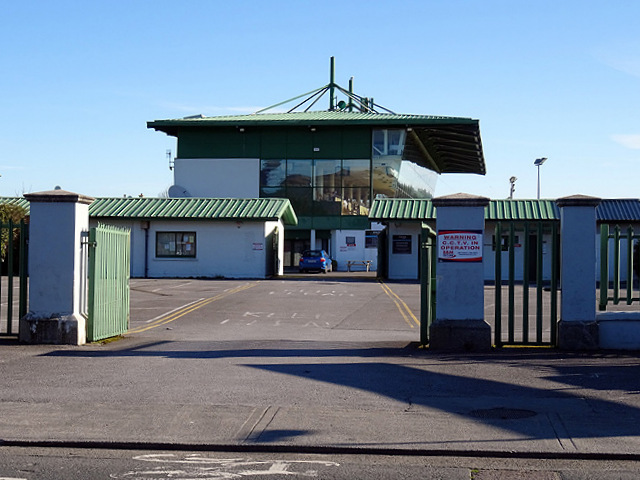
- The Kingdom Greyhound Stadium is the home of the Juvenile Classic
- Class: Feature
- Location: Kingdom Greyhound Stadium
- Inaugurated: 2007
- Sponsor: T Nolan C.V.R.T Centre

Race information
- Distance: 525 yards
- Surface: Sand
- Qualification: Juveniles only (15-24 months old)
- Purse: €11,000 (to the winner)

The Juvenile Classic is a greyhound racing competition held annually at the Kingdom Greyhound Stadium in Tralee, County Kerry, Ireland.

It was inaugurated in 2007 and therefore is a relatively new event but due to the significant winners prize money on offer (€15,000 in 2016) it stands as a feature event in the Irish racing calendar. The competition is only open to juveniles and was originally screened on Setanta Sports.

The 2020 event was cancelled due to COVID-19 and the 2021 event did not produce starting prices because of lockdown restrictions due to COVID-19.

== Venues & distances ==
- 2007–present (Tralee 525y)

== Sponsors ==
- 2007–2010 (Mike Cronin Readymix)
- 2011–2019 (GMHD (Gallivan/Murphy/Hooper/Dolan) Insurances)
- 2021–2023 (Greyhound & Petworld)
- 2025–2025 (T Nolan C.V.R.T Centre)

== Past winners ==
Year	Winner	Breeding	Trainer	SP	Time (sec)	Notes/ref
2007	Droopys Deco	Boherduff Light – Lavender Plan	Michael Dunphy	4/1	28.86	
2008	Droopys Torres	Droopys Maldini – Droopys Bridie	Pat Buckley	4/1	28.78	
2009	Paradise Miami	Elite State – Dalcash Diva	Seam Meade	3/1	28.60	
2010	Dromore Dazzler	Razldazl Billy – Graigues Echo	Jim Morrissey	5/2	28.66	
2011	Rockview Head	Head Bound – Three Star Gem	Peter Cronin	5/1	28.67	
2012	Airforce Diva	Head Bound – Movealong Alice	Owen McKenna	2/1	28.32	
2013	Farloe Calvin	Hondo Black – Me Margaret	Owen McKenna	4/6f	28.57	
2014	Vans Viking	Vans Escalade – Razldazl Lily	Graham Holland	6/4jf	28.33	
2015	Sidarian Vega	Westmead Hawk – Manic Fantasy	Graham Holland	4/5f	28.08	
2016	Escapism	Paradise Madison – Killacolla Glory	Owen McKenna	3/1	28.35	
2017	Paradise Marco	Cashen Legend – Dalcash Paradise	Sean Meade	4/1	29.20	
2018	Ballymac Bolger	Definate Opinion – Ballymac Razl	Liam Dowling	4/1	28.53	
2019	Toolmaker Daddy	Scolari Me Daddy – Droopys Isabella	Robert G Gleeson	4/1	28.40	
2020	cancelled due to COVID-19					
2021	Singalong Sally	Tullymurry Act – Droopys Smasher	Pat Buckley	No SP	28.58	No SP due to COVID-19
2022	Wi Can Dream	Cabra Firmino – Cabra Angel	Patrick Guilfoyle	9/4jf	28.37	
2023	Ballymac Marino	Vulturi – Jamaica Joy	Liam Dowling	1/1f	28.09	
2024	Ballymac Patriot	Ballymac Cashout – Ballymac Wisdom	Liam Dowling	2/1	28.44	
2025	Droopys Patriot	Dorotas Wildcat – Droopys Alyssa	Robert G. Gleeson	9/4	28.21	
