= Puppy Derby (Irish greyhound race) =

Irish greyhound racing competition

Irish Juvenile/Puppy Derby
- Class: Feature
- Location: Shelbourne Park
- Inaugurated: 1943
- Sponsor: Time Greyhound Nutrition

Race information
- Distance: 525 yards
- Surface: Sand
- Qualification: Juveniles only (15-24 months old)
- Purse: €25,000 (winner)

The Puppy Derby also known as the Juvenile Derby is a greyhound racing competition held annually at Shelbourne Park in Dublin, Ireland. The event switched to Shelbourne following the closure of Harold's Cross Stadium in the city district of Harold's Cross.

It is a major competition inaugurated in 1943 and is an integral part of the Irish greyhound racing calendar. The event is the Irish equivalent of the Puppy Derby held in the UK at Wimbledon Stadium. The competition restricted to puppies has a tradition for providing many stars of the future. Following the closure of Harold's Cross the event was switched to Shelbourne Park in 2017.

== Venues and distances ==
- 1943–1950 (Harold's Cross, 500 yards)
- 1951–1998 (Harold's Cross, 525 yards)
- 1999–1999 (Shelbourne Park, 525 yards)
- 2000–2016 (Harold's Cross, 525 yards)
- 2017–present (Shelbourne, 525 yards)

== Sponsors ==
- 1986–1993 (Burmah Castrol)
- 1994–1995 (Red Mills)
- 1996–1999 (Gain)
- 2000–2002 (DJ Reilly)
- 2003–2003 (BCR Press & Droopys Vieri)
- 2004–2004 (Droopys Stud and DJ Reilly)
- 2005–2012 (Harold's Cross Bookmakers)
- 2013–2020 (Dublin Coach)
- 2021–2021 (SIS)
- 2022–2022 (Racing Post GTV)
- 2023–2025 (Time Greyhound Nutrition)

== Past winners ==
Year	Winner	Breeding	Time (sec)	Trainer	SP	Notes/ref
1943	Fawn Cherry	Manhattan Midnight – Merry Cherry	28.36		/	Track record
1944	Astra	Tanist – Mad Darkie	28.52		7/4	
1945	Shaggy Lad	Castledown Lad – Shaggy Shore	27.98		1/10f	
1946	Ten Derrys	Tanist – Derryten	28.54	L O'Mara	/	
1947	Fearless Invader	Cameron – Absent Girl	28.70	Larry Malone	/	
1948	Buzz on Train	Train – Buzz On Peg	28.91	R Burke	7/2	
1949	For Sure	Bellas Prince – Fly Dancer	28.60		/	
1950	Sealed Castle	Manhattan Seale – Cottage Lake	28.51		/	
1951	Odile's Latch	Glenview Shaggy – Odilles Fancy	29.97		/	
1952	Ollys Pal	Bellas Prince – Quare Fire	29.89		/	
1953	Baytown Colt	Bahs Choice – Baytown Angel	30.30		/	
1954	The Grand Streak	The Grand Champion – Take Murex	30.12		/	
1955	Master of Me	Dare Devil - Beware of Me	30.00	Bernie Moran	25/1	
1956	Leg It Lucy	Slaney Record – Settara	29.93		/	
1957	Prince Olly	Champion Prince – Ollys Blackie	30.11		/	
1958	Balrath Flute		30.18	P McLoughlin	/	
1959	Choc Ice	Cheerful Chariot – For Certain Sure	29.80	Gay McKenna	/	
1960	King Niall		30.68		/	
1961	Wild Spark	Hi There - Wild Princess	29.75	Paddy Cross	/	
1962	Kudas Tiger	Sword Dance – Pretty Kuda	29.55		/	
1963	Fleadh Music	Clopook – Sight Unseen	29.40		/	
1964	Wonder Guest	Chieftains Guest – Some Gold	29.96	Wilhelmina Lennon	/	
1965	Prince of Roses	Oregon Prince – Cockleshell Rose	29.40	John Lacy	/	
1966	Little Kate	Hi Con – Primrose Girlie	30.17		/	
1967	Quarrymount Prim	Wonder Valley – Peace Time	29.70	J Mackey	/	
1968	Always Keen	Always Proud – Liberlatinus	29.75	Ger McKenna	/	
1969	Ballad	Deuce Of Tigers – Dublin Star	29.64	A Duffy	/	
1970	Hey Dizzy	Russian Gun – Keel Head	29.74	Tom Lynch	25/1	
1971	Luminous Lady	Always Proud – Land Mist	29.70	D Lennon	/	
1972	Clane Royal	Menelaus – Clane Shamrock	30.20	Tom Lynch	/	
1973	Blessington Boy	Monalee Champion – The Powder Plot	29.68	D Horgan	/	
1974	Shamrock Point	Monalee Champion – Gruelling Point	29.48	Ger McKenna	/	
1975	Elsinore Silver	The Grand Silver – Faneys Walk	29.40	Paddy Keane	/	
1976	Glen Rock	Monalee Champion – Fit Me In	29.08	Paddy Nugent	/	
1977	Hammond	Tranquility Sea – Run For Cover	29.46	Ger McKenna	/	
1978	Greenhill Paddy	Supreme Fun – Greenhill Fairy	29.40	Tommy Kane	/	
1979	Tivoli Cant	Can’t Decide – Swanky Debbie	29.88	Ger McKenna	/	
1980	Killahora Cha	Itsachampion – Killahora Lady	29.42	Mary McGrath	/	
1981	Greenwood Robic	Ritas Choice – Egmont Cindy	29.82	Tom Lynch	/	
1982	Aulton Villa	Killaclug Jet – Lady Maiden	29.30	Junior Reddan	/	
1983	Lauragh Six	Garradrimna – Emmerdale Pride	29.04	Ger McKenna	/	
1984	Summerhill Jet	Liberty Lad – Ceili Critic	29.24	Michael Enright	/	
1985	Burnpark Black	Sinbad – Burnpark Lass	29.32	Michael Browne	/	
1986	Dreams Of Kerry	Yellow Band – Wilton Cross	29.88	Junior Reddan	3/1	
1987	Make History	Game Ball – Raymonds Pride	29.38	Johnny Quigley	4/1	
1988	Airmount Grand	Daleys Gold- Airmount Jewel	29.26	Gerald Kiely	3/1	
1989	Crossford Dana	Meeniyan Prince- Crossford Daisy	29.32	Martin Boran	7/2	
1990	Summerhill Super	Daleys Gold- Tiny Tolcas	29.19	Michael Enright	2/1f	
1991	Polnoon Chief	Daleys Gold- Drumbeg Bracken	29.98	Fraser Black	3/1	
1992	Barefoot Racer	Hit The Lid- Barefoot Miss	29.06	Matt O'Donnell	10/1	
1993	Supplement	Adraville Bridge –Under The Clock	29.28	Eddie Wade	/	
1994	Glaskenny Echo	Lodge Prince - Rons Echo	28.80	Tony Byrne	2/1f	
1995	Airmount Rogue	Glen Park Dancer – Airmount Kelly	28.94	Gerald Kiely	5/1	
1996	Rantogue Pride	Alpine Minister - Rantogue Queen	29.04	George Royal	/	
1997	Treasury Tag	Phantom Flash – Browside Pat	29.05	Francie Murray	5/1	
1998	Prince Of Tinrah	Frightful Flash - Queen Of Tinrah	28.50	Dolores Ruth	5/2f	
1999	Cool Performance	Mustang Jack - Pony Nikita	28.50	Robert Gleeson	2/1f	
2000	Droopys Vieri	Top Honcho – Droopys Fergie	28.36	Paul Young (England)	4/6f	
2001	Rutland Budgie	Come On Ranger – Yasmin Jade	28.34	Paul Hennessy	5/2jf	
2002	Fortune Mike	Top Honcho – Dons Pride	28.40	Mike Keane	9/4	
2003	Droopys Cahill	Top Honcho – Droopys Kristin	28.56	Ian Reilly	6/4f	
2004	Droopys Brooklyn	Brookside Bear – Droopys Aisling	29.17	Ian Reilly	6/1	
2005	Greenwell Storm	Spiral Nikita – Greenwell Star	28.46	Fraser Black	6/1	
2006	Oran Majestic	Daves Mentor – Droopys Lauren	28.71	John McGee Sr.	7/2	
2007	Royal Treason	Top Honcho – Three Star Girl	29.12	Ollie Bray	3/1	
2008	Droopys Noel	Westmead Hawk – Drive On Buzz	28.49	John Linehan	11/2	
2009	Tullymurry Act	Top Honcho – Europa Spitfire	28.57	Pat Buckley	7/4	
2010	Melodys Royal	Royal Impact – Talita Beauty	28.78	Pa Fitzgerald	8/1	
2011	Sparta Maestro	Crash – Tinrah Kewell	28.59	Philip Gough	5/4f	
2012	Razldazl Luke	Razldazl Billy – Local Mol	28.52	Dolores Ruth	5/2	
2013	Vanrooney	Ace Hi Rumble – Lady Deise	28.66	Owen McKenna	7/2	
2014	Quietly	Tullymurry Act – Ballymac Bra	28.74	Ian Reilly	7/1	
2015	Anopheles	Droopys Scolari – Ballymac Razl	28.84	Liam Dowling	10/1	
2016	Droopys Wilbury	Romeo Recruit – Droopys Keisha	28.21	Pat Buckley	3/1	
2017	Skywalker Rafa	Laughil Blake – Coolavanny Royce	28.40	Michael J O'Donovan	10/1	
2018	Balline Kyle	Skywalker Puma – Galway Fancy	28.40	John Byrne	4/1	
2019	Broadstrand Bono	Droopys Sydney – Droopys Blossom	28.15	John Linehan	6/4f	
2020	Skywalker Barry	Droopys Jet – Calzaghe Jan	28.13	Mark O'Donovan	N/A	
2021	Droopys Gloss	Coolavanny Jap – Droopys Talia	28.49	John Linehan	5/2cf	
2022	Clona Duke	Malachi – Coolavanny Pearl	28.23	Graham Holland	20/1	
2023	Droopys Flytline	Laughil Blake – Droopys Curio	27.93	Robert G. Gleeson	15/8f	
2024	Callaway Knegare	Droopys Sydney – Droopys Sweet	27.96	Owen McKenna	1/2f	
2025	Getup The Boy	Ballymac Cashout – Peckies Flyer	28.31	Mark Robinson	16/1	
