= Mike Burton (rugby union) =

England international rugby union player (born 1945)

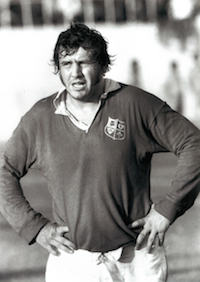
- Mike Burton in action for the British and Irish Lions in South Africa in 1974
- Born: 18 December 1945 (age 80) Maidenhead, Berkshire

Rugby union career
- Position: Prop
Amateur team(s)
Years	Team	Apps	(Points)
–	Gloucester		
International career
Years	Team	Apps	(Points)
1972-1978	England	17	
1974	British and Irish Lions		
197?	Barbarians	8	

Michael Alan Burton (born 18 December 1945, in Maidenhead) is a former English rugby union footballer, who won a reputation as an uncompromising prop forward for Gloucester, England and the British and Irish Lions.

== Club career ==
Burton arrived at Kingsholm from the local club Longlevens RFC and made his debut in the Gloucester front row at the age of 18 on 14 November 1964. He went on to make 366 appearances before retiring in 1978.

He was captain of Gloucester in the 1975 season and played 50 times at provincial level for Gloucestershire including 39 appearances in the County Championship, winning it four times and leading the county pack in a crushing 62–10 victory over Japan at Kingsholm in September 1976. It was with Gloucestershire that he made his third tour of South Africa in the same year.

He won the RFU National Cup (then the John Player Cup) with Gloucester at Twickenham in 1972 against Moseley and again in 1978 against Leicester.

In between those important championship wins, in 1977 Burton was honoured with an invitation to play for a "World XV" at the Parc des Princes stadium in Paris against the Grand Slam champions France.

The World XV was assembled to celebrate the 75th Anniversary of the Federation Francaise de Rugby and Burton was one of only three English international players included. The others were hooker Peter Wheeler and Number 8 Andy Ripley.

In October 1972, Burton scored a famous try for the Western Counties against the touring All Blacks at Kingsholm and played for the same regional team in the 15–14 win over Australia at Bath a year later.

Burton was also a member of the Gloucester squad that toured the US in 1977 and returned home with an unblemished record.

== International career ==
Burton made his England debut in 1972 against Wales and toured South Africa for the first time with an undefeated England side that year as a member of the test team that beat the Springboks 18–9 at Ellis Park.

A broken leg, sustained during an England training session at Twickenham in November 1972, saw him miss the autumn international against the All Blacks and the Five Nations matches in the early part of 1973 but he fought his way back to fitness and recovered well enough to be included in the England squad to tour Fiji and New Zealand later that year.

He toured Australia with England in 1975 where he became the first Englishman to be sent off at international level.

In the second Test against Australia ("The Battle of Brisbane") Burton was dismissed after just three minutes by referee Bob Burnett for a late tackle on the Australian winger Doug Osborne.

In 1974 Burton toured South Africa for a second time, this time as a member of Willie John McBride's invincible British and Irish Lions team. He played 28 times for England in all, 17 times in Tests, and represented the Barbarians on eight occasions.

== Post career ==
After retiring from rugby, Burton became a successful businessman in the field of corporate hospitality, specialist sports travel and player representation. His business interests took him around the world and he had a short spell playing recreational rugby in Canada for Toronto Lions.

He gave a great deal back to the game in later years by dedicating his time and business experience to the Barbarian FC as an influential member of the club's management board and also serving on the Board of Governors at Gloucester's successful rugby nursery, Hartpury College.

His contribution to Gloucester Rugby was recognised during the clubs 150th anniversary celebrations when on Saturday the 23rd of March 2024 at Kingsholm Stadium Mike Burton was inducted into the Gloucester Rugby Hall of Fame.

For many years Burton has bred and schooled racing greyhounds as part a lifelong interest in the sport and in 2024, he was granted a Licence to train greyhounds by the Greyhound Board of Great Britain the body responsible for the administration of the sport in the UK. Burton enjoys success at numerous tracks around the UK and steered Droopys Aladdin through to the quarter final of the 2025 English Derby at Towcester. 2025 English Greyhound Derby..

In April 2026 he sent Droopys Aladdin out to win the Classic Laurels and later that year he trained “Face The Storm” to victory in the Greyhound Derby of Wales. Face the Storm ran undefeated through the rounds and broke the track record at the Valley track in the semi final.
