= Patrick Janssens (greyhound trainer) =

Belgian greyhound trainer

Personal information
- Born: November 1970 (age 55) Belgium
- Occupation: Greyhound trainer

Sport
- Sport: Greyhound racing

Achievements and titles
- National finals: Derby wins: English Derby (2021, 2025); Classic/Feature wins: Oaks (2022, 2024); Laurels (2023); TV Trophy (2017); Gold Collar (2020); East Anglian Derby (2020, 2024, 2025); Golden Jacket (2020); Golden Sprint (2020, 2021, 2023); Sussex Cup (2016, 2020); Champion Stakes (2020); Kent Derby (2017, 2020, 2025); Juvenile (2019); The Puppy Derby (2019); Ladbrokes Gold Cup (2019); Ladbrokes Puppy Derby (2022); Eclipse (2022); Puppy Classic (2025); Steel City Cup (2025)

Patrick Jozef Anna Janssens (born 1970) is a Belgian born greyhound trainer. He has won the English Greyhound Derby twice (2021 and 2025) and has been British champion trainer.

== Career ==
Aged 10, Janssens frequented the Beringen, Geldrop and Amsterdam tracks and as a teenager he schooled and trained a greyhound to finish second in the Belgian Championships. During the late 1980s he moved to Ireland to work as a kennelhand for Matt O'Donnell and later Pat Dalton. He then moved to England and gained a position at Linda Jones' Imperial kennels in Lakenheath where he was working alongside Mark Wallis.

In 2005, he met his future wife Cheryl, who then joined the Imperial Kennels which were now under the control of Wallis. Nine years later in 2014 the pair left to start their own kennels and business in Thetford and ran greyhounds at Mildenhall Stadium before gaining a position at the newly opened Towcester Greyhound Stadium.

Success came quickly and during 2016 the kennel won the Sussex Cup with Barricane Tiger. The following year he won the prestigious TV Trophy with Goldies Hotspur at Towcester. A fine year resulted in qualification for the 2018 Trainers Championship where he finished in fifth place. Towcester closed in 2018 and Janssens joined Central Park but despite the forced move 2018 was another good year with a second qualification for the 2019 Trainers Championship where he finished runner-up behind Angela Harrison. Wins during 2019 included the Juvenile, The Puppy Derby and Ladbrokes Gold Cup.

In 2020, Patrick Janssens won his maiden Trainer of the Year title ending the eight-year reign of his former boss Mark Wallis. Other success during 2020 included the Gold Collar, East Anglian Derby, Golden Jacket, Golden Sprint, Sussex Cup, Champion Stakes and Kent Derby with stars such as Bockos Doomie, Desperado Dan and Kilara Lion.

During February 2021 Janssens announced his return to Towcester as an attached trainer and in July he reached the pinnacle of the sport by winning the 2021 English Greyhound Derby with Thorn Falcon.

Janssens trained his second Derby winner during the 2025 English Greyhound Derby with a black dog called Droopys Plunge. The 10/1 shot foiled Irish Derby champion Bockos Diamond from winning a dual Derby and De Lahdedah from retaining his Derby title.

== Awards ==
Janssens has won the Greyhound Trainer of the Year in 2020 and the Trainers Championship in 2023.
