= Towcester Greyhound Stadium =

Greyhound racing venue in England

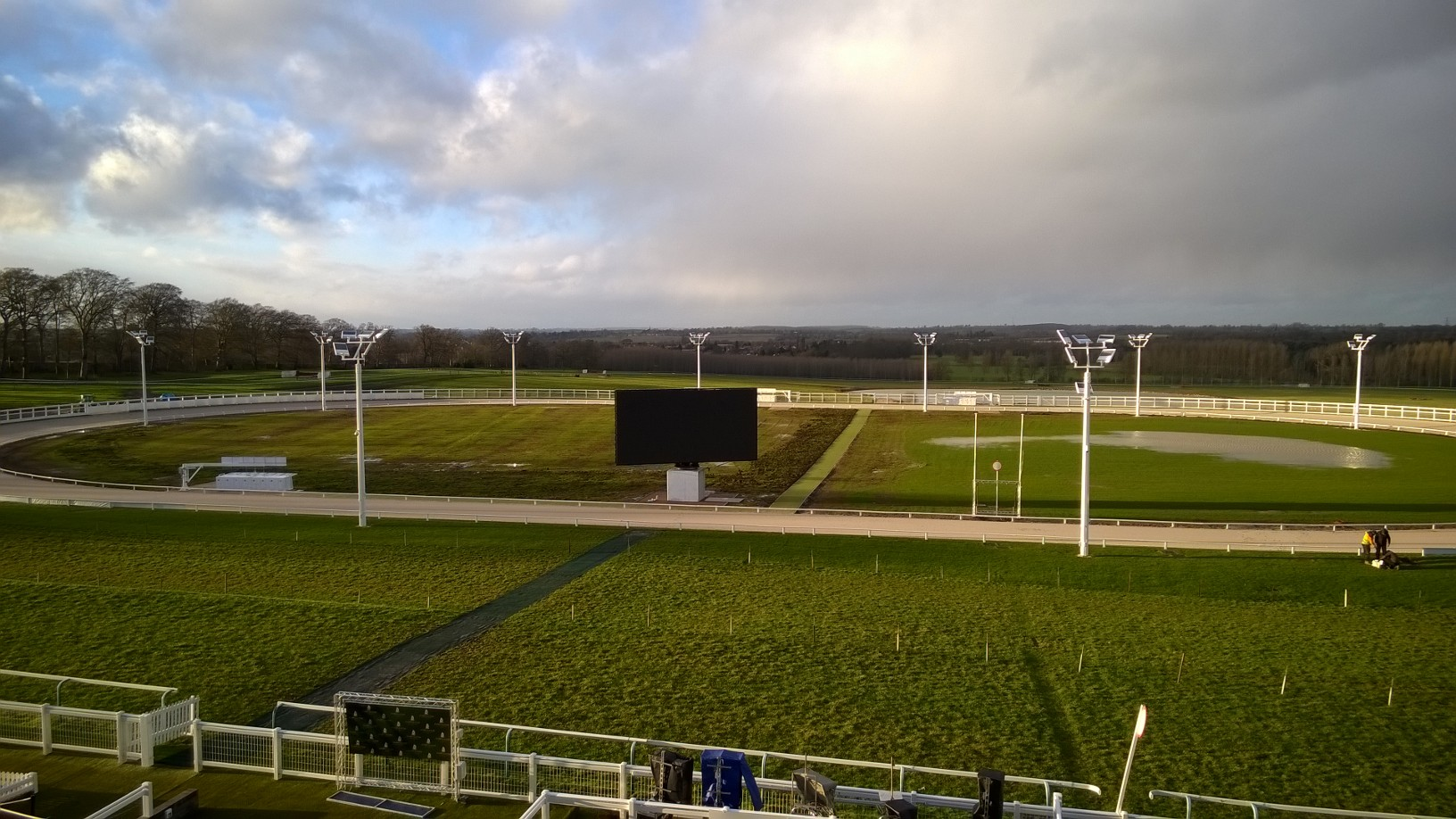
- View of Towcester Greyhound Track from the main grandstand
- Interactive map of Towcester Greyhound Stadium
- Location: Towcester Racecourse, Watling Street, Towcester, Northamptonshire
- Coordinates: 52.1237°N 0.9701°W
- Surface: Sand
- Field size: 420 metres (1,380 ft)

Construction
- Opened: 6 December 2014 re-opened 22 May 2020

Website
- Official website

Towcester Greyhound Stadium is a greyhound racing track located within Towcester Racecourse at Towcester in Northamptonshire, England. It has been the home of the English Greyhound Derby since 2021, having previously hosted the event from 2017 to 2018.

== Opening ==
Towcester opened on 6 December 2014 becoming the first track in Britain to open since the 1995 openings of Harlow and Sittingbourne. The idea of a track inside the horse racing course was created by Lord Hesketh the racecourse owner and Chief Executive Kevin Ackerman. Former Walthamstow Racing Manager Chris Page, Deputy Racing Manager Andy Lisemore and Steve Cale were recruited to run the operation.

== Construction ==
At a cost of £1.5 million the 420 metres circumference circuit was created by laying down 60,000 tonnes of soil so that the greyhound racing surface met the horse racing home straight at a level setting, resulting in a six-metre rise. The bends are very wide which assists the occasional eight dog race. The kennels were constructed inside unused horse stables and new trainers included five times champion trainer Mark Wallis, 2011 champion trainer Chris Allsopp, Kevin Hutton and Matt Dartnall. The distances are 260, 480, 500, 655, 686 and 906 metres and the first race was won by 4-1 shot Fairest Royal trained by Wallis. A big screen situated on the home straight was a new feature to greyhound tracks.

== Achievements ==
- Trainer Kevin Hutton won the prestigious Trainers Championship in March 2015.
- Hutton twice retained the title in 2016 and 2017, joining a select group of trainers to win more than one title.
- The track was crowned the BAGS National Champions at Perry Barr Stadium in December 2015 (team manager - Andy Lisemore).
- Retained the BAGS National Championship in December 2016 (team manager - Simon Pearson).
- Awarded the Greyhound Derby after the closure of Wimbledon Stadium.
- Awarded the Puppy Derby in 2017 following the closure of Wimbledon Stadium.
- Kevin Hutton won the 2018 English Greyhound Derby
- In 2018 the track gained another original classic race, the Oaks, from the Greyhound Racing Association (GRA).
- In 2018 the stadium signed a deal with ARC to race every Saturday morning and Sunday evening.
- In 2021, Thorn Falcon won the Derby for Belgian born Patrick Janssens

== 2018 administration ==
In August 2018 the future of Towcester racecourse was put in doubt. A statement released by the racecourse on 16 August read: "Towcester Racecourse Company Limited, proprietors of Towcester Racecourse, are currently experiencing trading difficulties and are in discussions with key stakeholders and professional advisers on the way forward. However, the directors have concluded that they have no alternative in the short term but to seek court protection and are now taking steps to place the company into administration. As a result, the last greyhound meeting was on 12 August.

On 23 August KPMG were appointed as administrators and 134 out of 137 members of staff at the racecourse were made redundant. Eight trainers joined Henlow, including Mark Wallis and Nick Savva while Kevin Hutton joined Monmore.

On 13 November it was announced by the administrators that the racecourse's assets were being sold to a company called Fermor Land LLP. This company was formed on 18 October (26 days before the sale) and is headed by Lord Hesketh's brother-in-law Mark Westropp, a trustee of the Hesketh Family trusts.

== Re-opening ==
In October 2019 Kevin Boothby, promoter of Henlow Stadium, signed a deal for a 10-year lease at Towcester, with the intention that greyhound racing would re-start in March 2020. The stadium's re-opening was delayed by the COVID-19 pandemic before eventually opening on 22 May 2020. Several major competitions returned to the track including the English Greyhound Derby, Puppy Derby and Juvenile.

On 1 November 2025 an organisation called Orchestrate took over the lease from Kevin Boothby (Henlow Racing). The move started badly with the English Puppy Derby not held due to unavailability of trials.

== Competitions ==
- The English Greyhound Derby
- The English Greyhound Derby Invitation
- English Puppy Derby
- Juvenile
- Blue Riband

== Track records ==
=== Current track records ===
Metres	Greyhound	Time (sec)	Date	Notes/ref
270	Aero Sacundai	15.35	29 June 2024	
500	Lennies Desire	28.39	31 May 2025	
712	Savana Jackpot	42.02	21 July 2024	
942	Mongys Wild	57.41	23 Mar 2025	

=== Former (2020 onwards) ===
Extended content

Metres	Greyhound	Time (sec)	Date	Notes
270	Bentley Crew	15.61	29 June 2021	
270	Bockos Jon Jo	15.64	30 March 2021	Northamptonshire Sprint
270	Shrewd Call	15.64	18 May 2021	
270	Havana Class	15.45	10 July 2021	
270	Flashing Willow	15.42	11 June 2022	
500	Priceless Jet	29.11	11 May 2021	
500	Warzone Tom	29.08	18 May 2021	
500	Bockos Belly	29.03	11 June 2021	2021 English Greyhound Derby 2nd round
500	Lautaro	28.84	19 May 2022	2022 English Greyhound Derby 1st round
500	Priceless Jet	28.78	11 June 2022	2022 English Greyhound Derby quarter final
500	Swords Rex	28.76	7 May 2023	2023 English Greyhound Derby trial stake
500	Clona Duke	28.73	26 May 2023	English Greyhound Derby 1st Round
500	Clona Duke	28.69	24 June 2023	English Greyhound Derby semi final
500	King Memphis	28.66	19 November 2023	Puppy Derby semi final
500	Romeo Command	28.64	31 December 2023	
500	Droopy Clue	28.58	14 April 2024	Derby trial stake
500	King Memphis	=28.58	24 May 2024	Derby heats
500	De Lahdedah	=28.58	29 June 2024	Derby first round
500	Barntick Bear	28.52	28 July 2024	
500	Avongate Venus	=28.52	8 September 2024	
500	Barntick Bear	28.44	20 October 2024	
712	Blue Mischief	43.47	30 March 2021	
712	Night Time Danny	43.20	30 March 2021	
712	Kishlawn Shakira	43.00	2 July 2021	
712	Salacres Pippy	42.90	14 November 2021	Hunt Cup final
712	Bockos Brandy	42.80	24 April 2022	
712	Havana Lover	42.76	16 October 2022	Hunt Cup semi final
712	Coonough Crow	42.43	22 June 2024	
942	Aayamza Royale	58.15	15 August 2021	

=== (2014–2018) ===
Extended content

Metres	Greyhound	Time	Date	Notes
260	Razldazl Banjo	15.63	6 December 2014	
260	Opus Star	15.54	13 December 2014	
260	Mays Teejay	15.47	20 December 2014	
260	Club Notes	15.46	27 December 2014	
260	Leaveittome	15.30	3 January 2015	
260	Mays Teejay	15.07	22 January 2015	
260	Cloudbursting	15.00	1 February 2015	
480	Fairest Royal	28.55	6 December 2014	
480	King Dec	28.46	6 December 2014	
480	Killglen Chief	28.44	6 December 2014	
480	Priests Place	28.41	12 December 2014	
480	Ballymac Brogan	28.30	13 December 2014	
480	King Dec	28.20	13 December 2014	
480	Ballymac Mossjoe	28.09	22 January 2015	
480	Blue Moment	27.91	22 January 2015	
480	Domino Storm	27.84	2 January 2015	
480	Forest Twilight	27.72	15 August 2015	Lowther Stakes heats
480	Forest Twilight	27.59	22 August 2015	Lowther Stakes final
500	Tyrur Shay	28.72	9 June 2017	2017 English Greyhound Derby 2nd round
655	Billys Bullet	39.69	6 December 2014	
655	Holdem Hawk	39.42	13 December 2014	
655	Billys Bullet	38.90	8 February 2015	
686	Touch Tackle	41.91	6 December 2014	
686	Vanrooney	41.55	13 December 2014	
686	Black Francis	41.45	22 January 2015	
686	Vanrooney	40.97	8 February 2015	
686	Rubys Rascal	40.89	24 June 2017	Derby Stayers heat
906	Supreme Rossie	57.09	6 December 2014	
906	Supreme Rossie	56.75	6 December 2014	
906	Ribble Atom	55.46	25 July 2015	TV Trophy Trial Stakes
906	Ballymac Bonnie	55.29	8 August 2015	TV Trophy heats
906	Droopys Cottage	55.17	8 August 2015	TV Trophy heats
480 H	Razldazlnewstalk	28.41	18 August 2015	
480 H	Ballymac Manix	28.38	24 June 2017	Champion Hurdle heats
