= 1947 UK & Ireland Greyhound Racing Year =

The 1947 UK & Ireland Greyhound Racing Year was the 22nd year of greyhound racing in the United Kingdom and the 21st year of greyhound racing in Ireland.

== Roll of honour ==
Major Winners
Award	Name of Winner
1947 English Greyhound Derby	Trev's Perfection
1947 Irish Greyhound Derby	Spanish Lad
1947 Scottish Greyhound Derby	Trev's Perfection
1947 Welsh Greyhound Derby	Trev's Perfection

== Summary ==
Racing was seriously affected by the Winter of 1946–47 in the United Kingdom and the fuel crisis. Tracks were forced to close from 11 February and on 11 February Sir Guy Bower, a Department Secretary for the Government, had closed down all greyhound tracks to conserve fuel and when racing was allowed to return it was restricted to Saturdays. On 15 March the fuel ban was lifted after 29 days, but 160 meetings were lost in London alone.

Despite the loss of nearly two months of racing the returns for the year were significant, the extraordinary year of 1946 would never be matched again but totalisator returns still reached £131,460,177. The government increased their tote tax deduction to 10%, earning over £13 million for the treasury, while track deductions remained at 6%. The government was subject to criticism from the industry because of the view that it was being treated harshly and unfairly in regard to tax, despite the fact that the excess profit tax had been removed in January 1947.

Trev's Perfection won the triple crown (the English Greyhound Derby, Scottish Greyhound Derby and Welsh Greyhound Derby) becoming the first greyhound in history to achieve this.

== Tracks ==
Oxford's Managing Director Leslie Calcutt was appointed as Director of Bristol Greyhound Racing Association Ltd. Wembley under the leadership of Arthur Elvin announces significant profits of £610,000 of which £343,000 was taken by the government in tax.

Swansea Greyhound Stadium in Fforestfach opened on 14 June, it was the third track in the Swansea area to open, although both Glais Stadium and White City Swansea were no longer in operation.

=== Tracks opened ===
Date	Stadium/Track	Location
14 June	Swansea Greyhound Stadium	Fforestfach, Swansea
30 August	Tamworth Greyhound Stadium	Fazeley
20 September	Huntingdon Greyhound Stadium	Huntingdon
22 November	Parkwood Greyhound Stadium	Keighley
? December	Cradley Heath Greyhound Stadium	Dudley
unknown	Larkhill Stadium	Yeovil
unknown	Victoria Ground	Stockton-on-Tees

== Competitions ==
Motts Regret reached the Wandsworth Spring Stakes final where he finished second to Balmaha, which attracted the attention of Fred Trevillion, a haulage contractor from Dartford in Kent, who was also a licensed greyhound trainer with a number of greyhounds in his kennels carrying the 'Trev's' prefix. He paid £900 to purchase Motts Regret and changed the dogs name to Trev's Perfection. His first race as Trev's Perfection was on 22 March at White City beating Parish Model and then he won the Circuit at Walthamstow Stadium. Trevillion also bought Jackie and renamed him Trev's Jackie, the blue dog had been favourite for the Easter Cup but was subsequently pulled out of the event by Trevillion.

Mondays News back from winter rest, headed for the Gold Collar at Catford Stadium and after winning a heat he would meet Trev's Perfection for the first time in the semi-finals. Mondays News continued his fine form, setting a new track record in that semi-final but a reverse of fortunes in the final saw Trev's Perfection win his first classic race. He would then go on to record the historic Triple Crown.

The Scurry Gold Cup went to the consistent Rimmells Black; he had been the runner up in the same event twelve months before. One month later the Laurels crown also went the way of Rimmells Black, despite a strong final that included Slaney Record, Tonycus and Mondays News now under the charge of Sidney Orton. Dante II, now trained by Bob Burls impressed, when winning the St Leger by eight lengths at his home track and Mondays News became the Grand Prix champion. The final field had included Priceless Border who finished second at odds on and Patsys Record. Trev's Perfection had lost his unbeaten run in the semi-finals and went to stud for the time being.

== News ==
An outbreak of disease rapidly swept the country and many litters were wiped out, veterinary surgeon Paddy Sweeney stated that this particular fever is nearly always fatal. The condition was sometimes known as hard pad disease but soon better known as distemper and there was no vaccine in 1947. The National Greyhound Racing Society, the business arm of the National Greyhound Racing Club (NGRC), donated £70,000 over a five-year period to the Veterinary Educational Trust.

On 21 February, at Temple Mills Stadium a meeting is held in daylight, without using any electricity. The hare is powered by two men on a tandem, with two relief pedallers on standby. Government officials are present and satisfied that the entire meeting is run without the use of electricity.

Eastville Stadium instigated a wide search for a greyhound called Mountford Quiver after she escaped from the track kennels, the bitch returned of her own accord 16 days later in good condition despite a harsh winter. The NGRC introduced a rule that owners of bitches that come into season must inform them.

A film featuring greyhound racing scenes at Clapton Stadium and White City Stadium is released, the film is called The Turners of Prospect Road and is criticised by sectors of the greyhound industry for stereotypical portrayal of greyhound racing.

Wimbledon introduced race specific perforated tote tickets in order to combat forged tickets.

== Ireland ==
Kilcohan Park in Waterford raced for the first time under Irish Coursing Club rules. Shelbourne Park track specialist Daring Flash, sired by the great Tanist and trained by Mary D'Arcy won the 1947 Irish Greyhound Derby.

The Northern Irish Parliament issues new legislation banning Sunday racing and also makes an order that will change the status of Northern Ireland tracks to the present day. They decide that any racing in Northern Ireland should come under the Irish Coursing Club which leaves the tracks in limbo because they would receive no funding or support from either the National Greyhound Racing Club or the Bord na gCon.

== Principal UK races ==
Grand National, White City (May 17 525y h, £350)
Pos	Name of Greyhound	Trainer	SP	Time	Trap
1st	Baytown Pigeon	Paddy McEllistrim	25-1	30.67	3
2nd	Obstinate Invader	Jerry Hannafin	1-2f	30.91	4
3rd	Joves Reason	Ken Appleton	5-1	30.92	2
4th	Overtime	Paddy Fortune	6-1	31.08	5
5th	On the Lee		100-7	31.56	1

Gold Collar, Catford (Jun 7, 440y, £600)
Pos	Name of Greyhound	Trainer	SP	Time	Trap
1st	Trev's Perfection	Fred Trevillion	7-1	25.52	3
2nd	Mondays News	Fred Farey	4-7f	25.78	4
3rd	Trev's Al	Fred Trevillion	20-1	25.96	2
4th	Shadowlands Delight	Ivy Regan	9-02	26.02	5
5th	Lisanley Bobby	Paddy Fortune	20-1	26.38	6
6th	Caher Knock		8-1	26.54	1

Scottish Greyhound Derby, Carntyne (Jul 5, 525y, £500)
Pos	Name of Greyhound	Trainer	SP	Time	Trap
1st	Trev's Perfection	Fred Trevillion	9-4f	29.25	2
2nd	Dante II	Wilf France	3-1	29.49	1
3rd	Tonycus	Leslie Reynolds	4-1	29.81	6
4th	Mondays News	Fred Farey	7-2	29.85	3
5th	Belle of Killarney		50-1	30.01	4
6th	Don Gipsey	Bill Savage	33-1	30.09	5

Welsh Derby, Arms Park (Jul 26, 525y £500)
Pos	Name of Greyhound	Trainer	SP	Time	Trap
1st	Trev's Perfection	Fred Trevillion	1-3f	29.74	2
2nd	Spring Ruler	Frank Davis	10-1	29.90	5
3rd	Negro's Lad	Jack Toseland	25-1	30.14	1
4th	Trev's Honey	Fred Trevillion	66-1	30.54	3
5th	Western Post	Frank Davis	7-2	30.56	6
6th	Trev's Councillor	Fred Trevillion	60-1	30.88	4

Scurry Gold Cup, Clapton (Jul 26, 400y £500)
Pos	Name of Greyhound	Trainer	SP	Time	Trap
1st	Rimmells Black	Stanley Biss	1-1f	23.11+	1
2nd	Kerry Rally	Paddy McEllistrim	4-1	23.19	2
3rd	Trev's Al	Fred Trevillion	5-1	23.35	4
4th	Terrys Monarch	L Gould	4-1	23.39	6
5th	Hollybrook Border	Archie Whitcher	20-1	23.55	3
N/R	Sparkling Billow	S Smith			

+Track Record

Laurels, Wimbledon (Aug 23, 500y, £600)
Pos	Name of Greyhound	Trainer	SP	Time	Trap
1st	Rimmells Black	Stanley Biss	8-1	28.77	3
2nd	Slaney Record	Jack Toseland	100-6	28.78	1
3rd	Lisanley Bobby	Paddy Fortune	50-1	29.22	6
4th	Tonycus	Leslie Reynolds	4-5f	29.30	2
5th	Mondays News	Sidney Orton	11-4	29.46	4
6th	Corrie	Sidney Orton	11-2	29.82	5

Oaks, White City (Sep 13, 525y, £500)
Pos	Name of Greyhound	Trainer	SP	Time	Trap
1st	Rio Cepretta	Stanley Biss	6-5f	29.32	4
2nd	Itzadaisy	G Hughes	6-4	29.34	1
3rd	Barlova Jean	A Roberts	100-8	29.74	5
4th	Ramblers Destiny	Stan Biss	100-7	30.06	2
5th	Trev's Castle	Fred Trevillion	25-1	30.22	6
6th	Gaiety		25-1	30.70	3

St Leger, Wembley (Oct 4, 700y, £600)
Pos	Name of Greyhound	Trainer	SP	Time	Trap
1st	Dante II	Bob Burls	2-9f	39.70	3
2nd	Shadowlands Delight	Ivy Regan	25-1	40.34	4
3rd	Rio Cepretta	Stan Biss	7-1	40.35	1
4th	Trev's Jackie	Fred Trevillion	100-7	40.47	2
5th	Come up First		25-1	40.65	6
6th	Latest Surprise	Lilah Shennan	33-1	40.81	5

Cesarewitch, West Ham (Oct 25, 600y, £600)
Pos	Name of Greyhound	Trainer	SP	Time	Trap
1st	Red Tan	Tom Baldwin	12-1	31.30	4
2nd	Itzadaisy	G Hughes	11-4	31.33	1
3rd	Parish Model	J Bott	10-1	31.37	6
4th	Kilrid Hero	Tom Johnston Sr.	2-1jf	31.47	3
5th	Rio Cepretta	Stan Biss	2-1jf	31.63	2
6th	Greenane Pine	Stan Biss	25-1	32.19	5

The Grand Prix Walthamstow (Nov 8, 525y, £500)
Pos	Name of Greyhound	Trainer	SP	Time	Trap
1st	Mondays News	Sidney Orton	2-1	30.41	5
2nd	Priceless Border	Leslie Reynolds	8-11f	30.61	3
3rd	Trumpery	Leslie Reynolds	33-1	30.63	2
4th	Funny Mick	Bob Burls	20-1	30.79	6
5th	Patsys Record	Stan Biss	10-1	30.91	1
6th	Castledown Tiptoes	D Hayes	100-8	31.31	4

== Totalisator Returns ==
Extended content

The totalisator returns declared to the licensing authorities for the year 1947 are listed below. Tracks that did not have a totalisator in operation are not listed.

Stadium	Turnover £
London (White City)	10,769,353
London (Harringay)	7,370,257
London (Wembley)	6,940,413
London (Walthamstow)	4,520,380
London (Wimbledon)	3,888,379
London (Stamford Bridge)	3,787,382
London (Catford)	3,785,312
London (Clapton)	3,747,953
London (Wandsworth)	3,316,001
Brighton & Hove	2,758,525
Manchester (Belle Vue)	2,721,547
London (New Cross)	2,490,490
London (West Ham)	2,451,233
London (Park Royal)	2,402,978
London (Hendon)	2,115,518
London (Hackney)	1,951,506
Birmingham (Perry Barr, old)	1,870,214
Southend-on-Sea	1,666,187
Sheffield (Owlerton)	1,618,871
Glasgow (Shawfield)	1,601,986
London (Charlton)	1,579,299
Coventry (Lythalls Lane)	1,529,244
Bradford (Greenfield)	1,463,276
Edinburgh (Powderhall)	1,454,951
Birmingham (Hall Green)	1,448,195
Glasgow (Albion)	1,415,227
Southampton	1,396,063
Sheffield (Darnall)	1,393,433
Blackpool (St Anne's)	1,390,253
Manchester (Salford)	1,354,726
Bristol (Eastville)	1,269,299
Crayford & Bexleyheath	1,269,077
Leicester (Blackbird Rd)	1,224,945
Glasgow (White City)	1,213,276
Romford	1,076,099
Portsmouth	1,051,032
Newcastle (Brough Park)	1,037,750
Glasgow (Carntyne)	1,025,410
Liverpool (Stanley)	983,540
Manchester (White City)	982,716
Liverpool (White City)	957,067
Ramsgate (Dumpton Park)	945,600
Reading (Oxford Road)	931,814
Newcastle (Gosforth)	858,331
London (Dagenham)	854,225
Birmingham (Kings Heath)	852,303

Stadium	Turnover £
Bradford (City)	837,495
Leeds (Elland Road)	837,433
Rochester & Chatham	828,613
Nottingham (White City)	801,806
Cardiff (Arms Park)	797,076
Chester	794,730
South Shields	791,073
Gloucester & Cheltenham	748,859
Wolverhampton (Monmore)	724,320
Slough	700,974
Oxford	699,549
Gateshead	686,782
Liverpool (Seaforth)	681,145
Plymouth	660,472
Stoke-on-Trent (Hanley)	646,007
Liverpool (Breck Park)	624,157
Yarmouth	621,556
Long Eaton	620,780
Newcastle (White City)	606,005
West Hartlepool	583,460
Hull (Old Craven Park)	578,628
Glasgow (Firhill)	569,356
Ashington (Co Durham)	541,547
Sunderland	535,649
Preston	512,711
Bristol (Knowle)	495,354
Warrington	490,818
Exeter (County Ground)	487,887
Stoke-on-Trent (Cobridge)	466,994
Exeter (Marsh Barton)	458,826
Derby	452,826
Bolton	449,300
Sheffield (Hyde Park)	433,064
Stanley (Co Durham)	430,665
Ipswich	417,101
Willenhall	413,347
Norwich (Boundary Park)	400,155
Middlesbrough	384,632
Blackburn	376,136
Houghton-le-Spring	325,286
Norwich (City)	317,146
Aberdeen	288,488
Rochdale	252,811
London (Southall)	223,926
London (Stratford)	219,931
Luton	208,778

Stadium	Turnover £
Easington (Co Durham)	203,778
Wigan (Poolstock)	203,614
Ayr (Tams Brig)	196,732
Newport	192,354
London (Harlington Corner)	176,331
St Helens	173,214
Kingskerswell (Devon)	157,233
Leeds (Parkside)	156,396
Doncaster (Spotbrough)	147,357
Northampton	142,458
Ramsgate (Newington)	138,664
Workington	135,738
Coundon (Co Durham)	127,708
Stockport (Hazel Grove)	118,133
Aldershot	116,197
Oldham	111,681
Wallyford (East Lothian)	104,704
Wishaw (North Lanarks)	102,708
Tamworth	96,126
Kilmarnock	91,547
Rotherham	84,081
Falkirk (Brockville Park)	74,725
Glasgow (Coatbridge)	61,826
Wakefield	53,347
Peterborough	49,719
Staines	47,165
Glasgow (Mount Vernon)	41,407
Thornton (Fife)	39,018
Wombwell (South Yorks)	34,908
Barry	32,690
Edinburgh (Stenhouse)	29,645
Belmont (Co Durham)	27,993
Worksop	25,968
Motherwell (Clyde Valley)	25,821
Armadale	25,819
Leicester (Coalville)	23,981
Hull (Boulevard)	23,363
Irvine (Caledonian)	22,026
Irvine (Townhead)	18,558
Keighley	18,213
Castleford (Whitwood)	14,509
Aberdare	14,359
Wheatley Hill	12,228
Shirebrook	5,356
Leicester (Hinckley)	4,986
Thurnscoe (S Yorks)	564

Summary

Country	No of tracks+	Turnover
England	165	£ 122,212,822
Wales	6	£ 844,125
Scotland	39	£ 8,403,230
Total	210	£ 131,460,177

+ number of tracks include those without a tote in operation
