= 1948 UK & Ireland Greyhound Racing Year =

The 1948 UK & Ireland Greyhound Racing Year was the 23rd year of greyhound racing in the United Kingdom and the 22nd year of greyhound racing in Ireland.

== Roll of honour ==
Major Winners
Award	Name of Winner
1948 English Greyhound Derby	Priceless Border
1948 Irish Greyhound Derby	Western Post
1948 Scottish Greyhound Derby	Western Post
1948 Welsh Greyhound Derby	Trev's Perfection

== Summary ==
The annual totalisator turnover was £99,449,342, which although the fourth highest ever recorded was also the second consecutive drop since 1946. The minimum betting stake on the track totalisator was increased from two to four shillings but quickly changed back following a widespread slump. The government ban on mid-week racing continued.

Western Post and Priceless Border claimed the big Derby races but Local Interprize was the star of the year, after he claimed four classic competitions. They were the Gold Collar, Scurry Gold Cup, Welsh Greyhound Derby and the Cesarewitch.

== Competitions ==
A greyhound called Narrogar Ann from a litter of six, out of the bitch Winnie of Berrow (winner of the 1944 Eclipse) came to prominence when successful in the Western Two year Old Produce Stakes. Narrogar Ann trained by Joe Farrand at Oxford Stadium beat littermates Narrogar Dusty and Narrogar Tommy who finished second and third respectively. Narrogar Ann would soon move to Leslie Reynolds at Wembley.

Local Interprize won the Laurels and Welsh Derby, in the latter he recorded a seven length final win in a new track record time defeating a field that included the Scottish Greyhound Derby champion Western Post, an 84lb fawn and white dog. Local Interprize then won the Scurry final by eight lengths before losing out to Good Worker trained by former Surrey cricketer Jack Daley, in the Laurels. Local Interprize finished the year by claiming a remarkable fourth classic when picking up the Cesarewitch trophy on 23 October.

== Tracks ==
Rayleigh Weir Stadium in Southend-on-Sea was one of seven known track to open, three of them were in Ireland. Breck Park Stadium in Liverpool, closed following a devastating fire and fire also destroyed most of the stands at Long Eaton Stadium. The total number of tracks in the United Kingdom with a betting licence was 209, of which 77 were affiliated to the National Greyhound Racing Society and raced under National Greyhound Racing Club rules.

=== Tracks opened ===
Date	Stadium/Track	Location
?? March	Rayleigh Weir Stadium	Rayleigh, Essex
30 April	St Conleth's Park	Newbridge, County Kildare
17 May	Wisbech Greyhound Stadium	Wisbech
30 July	Youghal Greyhound Stadium	Youghal
13 September	Thurles Greyhound Stadium	Thurles
11 December	Mansfield Woodhouse Greyhound Stadium	Mansfield Woodhouse
??	Jesmond Dene Stadium	Tredegar

== News ==
On 1 April, Fred Trevillion, Arthur Hancock (head kennel-man) and Trev's Perfection left on the Queen Mary for Raynham Park, Raynham, Massachusetts in the United States, where the dog was expected to make headlines. The venture was a failure and in five races he did not win one and returned to England in July. Sir William Gentle died.

== Ireland ==
The Irish Greyhound Derby offered a record £1,000 first prize and attracted the Frank Davis trained Western Post; Davis put him with Paddy Moclair for the duration of the event. Moclair had originally bought the dog at the Limerick sales for £240 before selling him to Davis for £2,000. The fawn and white dog became the first winner of the Scottish and Irish Derby.

The Greyhound Racing Association set up the Kingsfurze breeding establishment at Naas in County Kildare, the seven acre grounds included a house, cottage and 15 runs. The greyhounds would transfer to training establishments within the GRA as soon as they were older enough.

== Principal UK races ==
Grand National, White City (May 17 525y h, £350)
Pos	Name of Greyhound	Trainer	SP	Time	Trap
1st	Joves Reason	Ken Appleton	2-1	30.37	4
2nd	Another Benny	Gordon Nicholson	13-8f	30.45	5
3rd	Wild Wave	Dave Barker	5-2	30.61	2
4th	Sunburst		6-1	30.67	3
N/R	Baytown Pigeon	Paddy McEllistrim			

Gold Collar, Catford (Jun 5, 440y, £600)
Pos	Name of Greyhound	Trainer	SP	Time	Trap
1st	Local Interprize	Stanley Biss	8-13f	25.71	6
2nd	Kerry Rally	Paddy McEllistrim	20-1	25.77	3
3rd	Ala Mein II	Wembley	10-1	25.83	2
4th	Tell Nobody		100-1	25.91	5
5th	Clonroche Lad	Ivy Regan	8-1	25.93	4
6th	Northam Edward	Leslie Reynolds	4-1	26.09	1

Scottish Greyhound Derby, Carntyne (Jul 17, 525y, £500)
Pos	Name of Greyhound	Trainer	SP	Time	Trap
1st	Western Post	Frank Davis	8-1	29.45	4
2nd	Always There		7-1	29.57	5
3rd	West End Dasher	Bob Burls	12-1	29.61	2
4th	Baytown Whitehorn		8-1	29.63	1
5th	Sheevaun	Paddy Fortune	4-6f	29.79	6
6th	Fiddle Strings	Jack Brennan	6-1	29.95	3

Scurry Gold Cup, Clapton (Jul 24, 400y £500)
Pos	Name of Greyhound	Trainer	SP	Time	Trap
1st	Local Interprize	Stanley Biss	5-4f	23.04	1
2nd	Clonroche Lad	Ivy Regan	3-1	23.68	6
3rd	Willington Bob	John Bassett	10-1	23.70	2
4th	Rebel Robert	R Hogben	5-1	23.72	5
5th	Rio Cavallero	Stan Biss	25-1	23.76	4
6th	Ironmaster	Bob Burls	7-1	23.92	3

Welsh Derby, Arms Park (Jul 28, 525y £500)
Pos	Name of Greyhound	Trainer	SP	Time	Trap
1st	Local Interprize	Stanley Biss	4-6f	29.32+	1
2nd	West End Dasher	Bob Burls	9-2	29.88	3
3rd	Western Post	Frank Davis	5-1	30.04	5
4th	Non Sectarian Girl		25-1	30.28	4
5th	Singora		100-8	30.48	2
6th	Circular Flex		100-6	30.50	6

+Track Record

Laurels, Wimbledon (Aug 25, 500y, £600)
Pos	Name of Greyhound	Trainer	SP	Time	Trap
1st	Good Worker	Jack Daley	5-2	28.49	5
2nd	Whiterock Abbey	Sidney Orton	4-1	28.51	6
3rd	Drumnagrella Lad	Frank Davis	6-1	28.71	4
4th	Northam Edward	Leslie Reynolds	10-1	28.83	2
5th	Local Interprize	Stan Biss	2-1f	28.87	3
6th	Mad Birthday	Stan Biss	6-1	29.27	1

Oaks, White City (Sep 18, 525y, £500)
Pos	Name of Greyhound	Trainer	SP	Time	Trap
1st	Night Breeze	Stan Biss	4-1	29.19	3
2nd	Steps of Grac	Jerry Hannafin	5-1	29.27	4
3rd	Baytown Stream	Stan Biss	10-1	29.30	5
4th	Jersey Creamery	Percy Stagg	1-1f	29.46	6
5th	Favourite Topsy		5-1	29.54	1
6th	Singora		50-1	29.78	2

The Grand Prix Walthamstow (Oct 9, 525y, £500)
Pos	Name of Greyhound	Trainer	SP	Time	Trap
1st	Ruby Cut	J P Bott	11-4	30.31	3
2nd	Northam Edward	Leslie Reynolds	4-1	30.47	1
3rd	Doughery Boy	Jonathan Hopkins	5-1	30.67	5
4th	Baytown Fox	Stan Biss	7-2	30.75	6
5th	Orphan Star	Fred Farey	10-1	31.15	4
6th	Freckled Major	Leslie Reynolds	7-2	31.31	2

St Leger, Wembley (Oct 2, 700y, £600)
Pos	Name of Greyhound	Trainer	SP	Time	Trap
1st	Streets After Midnight	Les Parry	5-2	40.40	3
2nd	Captain Lake	Jack Harvey	9-2	40.43	2
3rd	Northam Star	Leslie Reynolds	7-1	40.57	5
4th	Mayfair Mike	Leslie Reynolds	2-1f	40.85	4
5th	Ramblers Destiny		8-1	40.95	1
6th	Crafty Major		25-1	41.25	6

Cesarewitch, West Ham (Oct 23, 600y, £600)
Pos	Name of Greyhound	Trainer	SP	Time	Trap
1st	Local Interprize	Stanley Biss	11-4jf	30.88	4
2nd	Freckled Major	Leslie Reynolds	5-1	31.02	6
3rd	Captain Lake	Jack Harvey	11-4jf	31.42	1
4th	Whiterock Abbey	Sidney Orton	3-1	31.46	3
5th	Raths Record	Gunner Smith	10-1	31.70	2
6th	Confey Castle		25-1	32.02	5

== Totalisator Returns ==
Extended content

The totalisator returns declared to the licensing authorities for the year 1948 are listed below. Tracks that did not have a totalisator in operation are not listed.

Stadium	Turnover £
London (White City)	7,872,357
London (Harringay)	5,658,313
London (Wembley)	4,160,092
London (Walthamstow)	3,242,896
London (Catford)	2,897,074
London (Wimbledon)	2,868,844
London (Stamford Bridge)	2,688,310
London (Clapton)	2,658,628
London (Wandsworth)	2,516,682
Manchester (Belle Vue)	2,321,345
London (New Cross)	2,040,786
London (Park Royal)	1,944,490
London (Hendon)	1,809,806
London (West Ham)	1,729,260
Southend-on-Sea	1,694,181
Brighton & Hove	1,681,503
London (Hackney)	1,568,791
Birmingham (Perry Barr, old)	1,388,477
Southampton	1,300,648
Edinburgh (Powderhall)	1,283,282
London (Charlton)	1,282,880
Glasgow (Shawfield)	1,260,513
Crayford & Bexleyheath	1,135,768
Birmingham (Hall Green)	1,131,130
Sheffield (Owlerton)	1,115,939
Coventry (Lythalls Lane)	1,070,031
Blackpool (St Anne's)	1,069,065
Sheffield (Darnall)	1,008,317
Bristol (Eastville)	994,548
Manchester (Salford)	992,895
Romford	991,055
Bradford (Greenfield)	966,390
Newcastle (Brough Park)	955,771
Glasgow (White City)	935,215
Glasgow (Albion)	930,871
Liverpool (White City)	916,473
Leicester (Blackbird Rd)	908,270
Chester	873,419
Cardiff (Arms Park)	777,369
Wolverhampton (Monmore)	766,597
Portsmouth	759,044
Liverpool (Stanley)	754,551
Glasgow (Carntyne)	718,661
Birmingham (Kings Heath)	711,495
Ramsgate (Dumpton Park)	700,403
South Shields	681,456
Leeds (Elland Road)	676,525
Reading (Oxford Road)	662,421

Stadium	Turnover £
Rochester & Chatham	650,646
Slough	627,513
Gloucester & Cheltenham	618,328
London (Dagenham)	602,262
Gateshead	601,154
Newcastle (Gosforth)	600,222
Ashington (Co Durham)	493,816
Middlesbrough	484,634
Oxford	485,036
Glasgow (Firhill)	481,322
Bradford (City)	464,707
Newcastle (White City)	456,870
Stoke-on-Trent (Hanley)	450,629
Plymouth	446,505
Manchester (White City)	444,041
Yarmouth	428,635
Nottingham (White City)	420,698
Sunderland	416,914
Bolton	407,906
Liverpool (Seaforth)	385,078
Hull (Old Craven Park)	381,145
Stoke-on-Trent (Cobridge)	380,433
West Hartlepool	359,757
Derby	354,953
Exeter (County Ground)	354,494
Warrington	353,994
Long Eaton	348,566
Sheffield (Hyde Park)	340,467
Stanley (Co Durham)	328,754
Bristol (Knowle)	325,083
Blackburn	324,505
Preston	313,188
Aberdeen	311,843
Ipswich	276,202
Exeter (Marsh Barton)	270,931
Norwich (Boundary Park)	268,729
Houghton-le-Spring	265,147
Norwich (City)	249,350
Willenhall	197,117
Rochdale	196,953
London (Southall)	196,683
Luton	191,461
Newport	187,758
Tamworth	181,013
Doncaster (Spotbrough)	147,357
Taunton (Prior Park)	165,916
St Helens	158,777
Wigan (Poolstock)	158,582

Stadium	Turnover £
Easington (Co Durham)	155,471
Ayr (Tams Brig)	153,830
Keighley	151,072
London (Stratford)	131,979
London (Harlington Corner)	127,624
Hull (Boulevard)	125,285
Oldham	114,811
Ramsgate (Newington)	111,109
Leeds (Parkside)	109,072
Staines	108,756
Kingskerswell (Devon)	103,488
Coundon (Co Durham)	96,531
Northampton	89,335
Kilmarnock	76,165
Rotherham	71,983
Peterborough	69,885
Liverpool (Breck Park)	69,638+
Wallyford (East Lothian)	68,784
Wishaw (North Lanarks)	65,655
Aldershot	62,681
Falkirk (Brockville Park)	59,939
Pelaw Grange	57,015
Workington	56,581
Stockport (Hazel Grove)	55,940
Wakefield	49,711
Glasgow (Mount Vernon)	48,004
Wigan (Woodhouse)	47,400
Durham City	46,843
Edinburgh (Stenhouse)	36,001
Glasgow (Coatbridge)	35,786
Barry	31,853
Belmont (Co Durham)	25,919
Wombwell (South Yorks)	25,279
Worksop	24,785
Armadale	22,205
Leicester (Coalville)	20,354
Thornton (Fife)	19,996
Rayleigh (Essex)	17,602
Irvine (Townhead)	14,873
Irvine (Caledonian)	12,756
Aberdare	10,563
Stockton-on-Tees (Belle Vue)	9,906
Wheatley Hill	7,065
Shirebrook	2,558
Thornley (Co Durham)	2,522
Leicester (Hinckley)	2,075
Doncaster (Stainforth)	1,320
Thurnscoe (S Yorks)	748

+ closed during the year due to fire

Summary

Country	No of tracks+	Turnover
England	162	£ 92,163,823
Wales	9	£ 842,469
Scotland	38	£ 6,542,875
Total	209	£ 99,549,168

+ number of tracks include those without a tote in operation
