= 1938 UK & Ireland Greyhound Racing Year =

The 1938 UK & Ireland Greyhound Racing Year was the 13th year of greyhound racing in the United Kingdom and the 12th year of greyhound racing in Ireland.

== Roll of honour ==
Major Winners
Award	Name of Winner
1938 English Greyhound Derby	Lone Keel
1938 Irish Greyhound Derby	Abbeylara
1938 Scottish Greyhound Derby	Roeside Scottie

== Summary ==
1938 in the United Kingdom was a place of tension due to the unrest in Europe and the ongoing negotiations between the Prime Minister, Neville Chamberlain and Germany. However the public continued to embrace greyhound racing which was an affordable national pastime. Attendances at the National Greyhound Racing Club (NGRC) licensed tracks topped 26 million with totalisator turnover recorded as £39,352,839. The track tote deduction was 6% and the government tote tax was an additional 6%.

The leading greyhound company, the Greyhound Racing Association (GRA) significantly increased profits once again. The operating profit for 1938 was £278,000 (a substantial figure at the time) and attendances at GRA tracks increased rose to 4,408,412. The GRA also invested heavily into their breeding facility on the company owned Fan Court Farm, on the Longcross Road in Chertsey, Surrey.

Lone Keel won the 1938 English Greyhound Derby, he was jointly owned by Staines Greyhound Stadium's owner Jack Walsh and William Hill (the founder of the betting company.

The All England Cup was introduced at Brough Park as the most significant event outside of London and the trophy was presented by Helen Percy, Duchess of Northumberland.

Glen Ranger won the Golden Crest, reached three major finals and broke multiple track records throughout the year.

== Tracks ==
Six known tracks were opened, three of which were in Scotland. Independent tracks were common north of the border with many choosing not to apply for NGRC status and remaining as small unlicensed tracks.

=== Tracks opened ===
Date	Stadium/Track	Location
9 July	Denny Stadium	Denny
14 September	Hartlepool Stadium	Hartlepool
1 October	Coundon Greyhound Stadium	Coundon, County Durham
3 November	Houghton Stadium	Houghton-le-Spring, County Durham
21 December	Raploch Park	Larkhall
unknown date	North End Greyhound Stadium	Cowdenbeath
unknown date	Pontefract Greyhound Stadium	Pontefract

== Competitions ==
Trainer Joe Harmon experienced considerable success with his pair of kennels brothers, Puppy Derby champion Junior Classic and Juvenile Classic and Trafalgar Cup champion Quarter Day. Junior Classic overcame a tough field in the Gold Collar, a competition that included 1937 English Greyhound Derby champion Wattle Bark, now trained by Leslie Reynolds and Scurry Gold Cup champion Hexham Bridge. One week earlier Juvenile Classic had jumped to glory in the Grand National.

Jesmond Cutlet made an unsuccessful attempt at defending his Scottish Greyhound Derby title, when well beaten by favourite Roe Side Scottie in July and during the same month Orlucks Best won the Scurry Gold Cup, one year after he finished runner up in the same event. Ballyhennessy Sandills retained his Laurels crown, a great achievement because the final consisted of Wattle Bark, Bealtaine and Roe Side Scottie. Quarter Day claimed the Oaks from Gretas Rosary.

Nine days later Gretas Rosary picked up the St Leger winner's prize at Wembley. The blue brindle and white bitch had a qualifying heat in between the two classic competition finals and also accounted for the Irish Greyhound Derby winner Abbeylara. Quarter Day then returned to White City, in November and won the valuable 'White City' invitation race.

== Ireland ==
Abbeylara stood out as the leading greyhound in Ireland, the brindle dog easily won the Irish Greyhound Derby and the St Leger. He also reached the English St Leger final.

== News ==
GRA trainer Eddie Wright moved from his Powderhall kennels to the Hook Estate and Kennels and a track attachment at Harringay and the GRA also moved Harry Buck from Belle Vue to White City.

== Principal UK races ==
Grand National, White City (May 21, 525y h, £300)
Pos	Name of Greyhound	Trainer	SP	Time	Trap
1st	Juvenile Classic	Joe Harmon	2-1	30.35	5
2nd	Bay Moon	Joe Harmon	8-1	30.47	2
3rd	Grakle	Paddy McEllistrim	8-1	30.87	3
4th	Mount Pottinger	Jerry Hannafin	25-1	31.03	4
5th	Lenins Ring	Joe Harmon	4-7f	31.19	1

Gold Collar, Catford (May 28, 400y, £600)
Pos	Name of Greyhound	Trainer	SP	Time	Trap
1st	Junior Classic	Joe Harmon	11-8f	25.77	6
2nd	Demotic Mack	Charles Cross	100-7	25.87	2
3rd	Sandfield Girl	Archie Whitcher	6-1	26.19	3
4th	Hexham Bridge	Bill Cowell	5-1	26.51	1
5th	Golden Alexander	Jimmy Campbell	6-1	26.59	5
6th	Wattle Bark	Leslie Reynolds	7-2	26.69	4

Scottish Greyhound Derby, Carntyne (Jul 9, 525y, £240)
Pos	Name of Greyhound	Trainer	SP	Time	Trap
1st	Roeside Scottie	Michael Downey	1-1f	29.53	6
2nd	Whispering Symphony	Michael Downey	7-2	29.54	2
3rd	Jesmond Cutlet	Dal Hawkesley	6-1	29.86	3
4th	Kinauld Demonstrator	Eddie Wright	14-1	30.02	4
5th	Model Hope	J.W Day	10-1	30.18	5
6th	Yarridge Heights	Bill Cowell	10-1	30.34	1

Scurry Gold Cup, Clapton (Jul 23, 400y, £500)
Pos	Name of Greyhound	Trainer	SP	Time	Trap
1st	Orlucks Best	Charlie Ashley	11-8f	23.24	6
2nd	Demotic Mack	Charles Cross	4-1	23.40	5
3rd	Kilcora Willie	Charlie Ashley	8-1	23.44	4
4th	Westley Bridge	Jack Harvey	100-7	23.68	2
5th	Ballyhennessy Sandills	Sidney Orton	11-4	23.72	3
6th	Found At Last	Jack Power	100-7	23.96	1

Laurels, Wimbledon (Aug 12, 500y, £700)
Pos	Name of Greyhound	Trainer	SP	Time	Trap
1st	Ballyhennessy Sandills	Sidney Orton	11-8f	28.50	6
2nd	Wattle Bark	Leslie Reynolds	7-2	28.78	1
3rd	Glen Ranger	Les Parry	9-4	28.82	5
4th	Bealtaine	Joe Harmon	100-6	28.88	3
5th	Roe Side Scottie	Michael Downey	20-1	28.96	2
6th	Woodstock Swift	Joe Harmon	25-1	29.36	4

Oaks, White City (Sep 10, 525y, £300)
Pos	Name of Greyhound	Trainer	SP	Time	Trap
1st	Quarter Day	Joe Harmon	4-5f	29.49	5
2nd	Gretas Rosary	Eddie Wright	11-4	29.93	2
3rd	Dogberry Davate	E Harfield	100-8	30.49	3
4th	Sally Maid	A Rees	6-1	30.57	1
5th	Oak Cutlet	Marshall	8-1	30.61	4
6th	Grey Ribbon	Tom Lightfoot	33-1	31.25	6

St Leger, Wembley (Sep 19, 700y, £500)
Pos	Name of Greyhound	Trainer	SP	Time	Trap
1st	Gretas Rosary	Eddie Wright	7-4jf	40.82	4
2nd	Gayhunter	A Jack	7-2	40.98	2
3rd	Keeries Pride	Patrick McKinney	100-8	41.22	5
4th	Catherine of Waterhall	Bill Cowell	100-8	41.23	6
5th	Neville the Devil	Leslie Reynolds	10-1	41.43	3
6th	Abbeylara	Tom Black	7-4jf	41.59	1

The White City White City (Nov 5, 525y, £2,000)
Pos	Name of Greyhound	Trainer	SP	Time	Trap
1st	Quarter Day	Joe Harmon	2-1f	29.58	5
2nd	Jesmond Cutlet	Dal Hawkesley	100-7	29.98	3
3rd	Roeside Scottie	Michael Downey	7-1	30.46	6
4th	Glen Ranger	Les Parry	3-1	30.48	2
5th	Cinderella of Waterhall	Bill Cowell	10-1	30.56	4
6th	Ballyjoker	Sidney Orton	11-4	30.60	1

Cesarewitch, West Ham (Dec 12, 600y, £500)
Pos	Name of Greyhound	Trainer	SP	Time	Trap
1st	Ballyjoker	Sidney Orton	3-1	34.02	1
2nd d/h	Barryreel	Joe Harmon	8-1	34.34	2
2nd d/h	Colonel of Waterhall	Leslie Carpenter	6-1	34.34	3
4th	Glen Ranger	Les Parry	1-1f	34.42	4
5th	Great Record	Eddie Wright	10-1	34.44	5
6th	Neville the Devil	Leslie Reynolds	33-1	35.00	6

Key d/h = dead heat

== Totalisator Returns ==
Extended content

The totalisator returns declared to the licensing authorities for the year 1938 are listed below. Tracks that did not have a totalisator in operation are not listed.

Stadium	Turnover £
London (White City)	4,003,332
London (Harringay)	3,033,931
London (Wimbledon)	2,210,504
London (Wembley)	1,617,278
London (West Ham)	1,590,106
London (Stamford Bridge)	1,475,624
Glasgow Stadia combined (Albion, Carntyne, Firhill, Shawfield, White City)	1,427,174
London (Walthamstow)	1,380,475
London (Clapton)	1,297,462
London (Catford)	1,090,357
London (Park Royal)	933,827
Manchester (Belle Vue)	863,352
London (Wandsworth)	862,614
London (Hackney)	810,869
London (New Cross)	715,021
Edinburgh (Powderhall)	593,481
Manchester (White City)	589,786
London (Hendon)	493,766
Newcastle (Gosforth)	464,145
Sheffield (Owlerton)	444,933
Liverpool (Seaforth)	425,460
Gateshead	410,589
Bradford (Greenfield)	407,166
Manchester (Salford)	375,136
Crayford & Bexleyheath	354,734
Newcastle (Brough Park)	352,634
Birmingham (Perry Barr, old)	351,205
Bristol (Eastville)	349,525
Birmingham (Hall Green)	346,452
Brighton & Hove	336,366

Stadium	Turnover £
South Shields	336,519
London (Charlton)	312,690
Newcastle (White City)	298,775
Leeds (Elland Road)	292,579
Wolverhampton (Monmore)	291,069
Liverpool (White City)	286,394
Romford	283,486
Liverpool (Stanley)	245,642
Birmingham (Kings Heath)	245,213
Willenhall	236,918
Ashington (Co Durham)	228,360
Sheffield (Darnall)	226,229
Nottingham (White City)	219,514
West Hartlepool	216,326
Portsmouth	210,584
Southampton	206,895
Cardiff (Arms Park)	203,169
Gloucester & Cheltenham	196,112
Stanley (Co Durham)	193,962
Slough	182,949
Rochester & Chatham	182,458
Reading (Oxford Road)	177,686
Blackpool (St Anne's)	166,593
Plymouth	162,678
Stoke-on-Trent (Hanley)	154,673
Middlesbrough	141,108
Preston	134,087
Derby	132,324
Liverpool (Breck Park)	131,778
Stoke-on-Trent (Cobridge)	121,151
Exeter (County Ground)	117,118
Norwich (Boundary Park)	113,365

Stadium	Turnover £
Sheffield (Hyde Park)	111,772
Ipswich	106,332
Newport	100,908
Houghton-le-Spring	92,793
Bradford (City)	88,653
Warrington	82,645
Coventry (Lythalls Lane)	75,886
Falkirk (Brockville Park)	71,816
London (Stratford)	61,503
Luton	59,050
Wigan (Poolstock)	55,205
Aberdeen	54,654
Edinburgh (Stenhouse)	42,136
Wallyford (East Lothian)	36,359
Wishaw (North Lanarks)	36,359
Doncaster (Spotbrough)	36,041
London (Southall)	34,405
London (Dagenham)	31,541
Rochdale	31,132
Norwich (City)	25,260
Bolton	22,001
Easington (Co Durham)	20,331
Thornton (Fife)	20,275
Coundon (Co Durham)	17,102
Leeds (Parkside)	16,470
Worksop	9,398
Rotherham	7,905
Castleford (Whitwood)	6,442
Ayr (Tams Brig)	4,594
Stockport (Hazel Grove)	2,437
Wombwell (South Yorks)	828

Summary

Country	No of tracks (with tote)	Turnover
England	81	£ 33,545,716
Wales	2	£ 304,077
Scotland	9	£ 2,189,090
Total	92	£ 36,038,883
