= 1944 UK & Ireland Greyhound Racing Year =

The 1944 UK & Ireland Greyhound Racing Year was the 19th year of greyhound racing in the United Kingdom and the 18th year of greyhound racing in Ireland.

== Roll of honour ==
Major Winners
Award	Name of Winner
1944 English Greyhound Derby	Suspended
1944 Irish Greyhound Derby	Clonbonny Bridge
1944 Scottish Greyhound Derby	Gladstone Brigadier
1944 Welsh Greyhound Derby	Suspended

== Summary ==
The popularity of racing continued to grow with attendances and totalisator turnover both rising once again despite the wartime restrictions imposed in many other aspects of life. Attendances and annual totalisator turnover increased significantly once again. The totalisator turnover saw an increase in excess of 20% from the previous year when a figure of 74,845,814 was declared.

The leading greyhound company, the Greyhound Racing Association (GRA) recorded a record profit of £578,000 but the GRA chairman and managing director Francis Gentle (son of William Gentle) announced that government restrictions on racing fixtures and excess profits taxation was affecting the business dividends. The taxation was the equivalent of £2,000 per day.

The headlines created during the year revolved around the success of two greyhounds Ballynennan Moon and Ballyhennessy Seal.

== Ballynennan Moon ==
After a short rest during the winter the brindle dog won his first ten races and was again on course to beat Mick the Miller's world record for consecutive wins. However his attempt was unsuccessful when he was again beaten by Laughing Lackey, at White City. His career came to an end in the Stewards' Cup when he pulled up lame and was retired to stud. At stud he was the first stud dog in history to command a 100 guineas mating fee but he failed to sire any offspring of note. His career record read 65 wins from his 91 races in Britain and he won 38 trophies and £4,000 in prize money, a significant figure during the 1940s.

== Ballyhennessy Seal ==
Ballyhennessy Seal moved from his Catford Stadium base to Wimbledon Stadium and was placed in the care of trainer Stan Martin. In the May Stakes at Stamford Bridge he set a new track and world record when clocking 27.64sec for the 500yds course. This was followed by an appearance in the Circuit at Walthamstow Stadium where another new track record was set. The track record time of 28.62 was recorded in the semi-finals with yet another track record of 28.59 coming in the final. The greyhound had set three track records in eight days and was still officially a puppy. Other competition wins included the Wembley Summer Cup, the Stewards Cup and the International.

== Competitions ==
The 1943 Irish Greyhound Derby champion Famous Knight had left Ireland to race in the United Kingdom and reached the final of the 1944 Scottish Greyhound Derby, which was won by Gladstone Brigadier.

== Ireland ==
The 1944 Irish Greyhound Derby was considered the best to date. Shelbourne Park entries included Mad Tanist, Tanimon, Fawn Cherry, Mountain Emperor, Fair Marquis, Clonbonny Bridge, Down Signal and Castledown Turn. A controversial final ended with Clonbonny Bridge defeating the early leader Down Signal in a disputed close finish.

As the year progressed and wartime restrictions were relaxed slightly it became apparent that British breeding (which was at an extreme low) could not supply the industry with enough greyhounds. This led to an export from Ireland to England of greyhounds valuing £434,685 during 1944.

== News ==
Four top Irish-bred greyhounds were sold by Aldridges on 21 July, at their famous greyhound auctions. The four owned by Miss G Stockman from London and trained by Stan Biss went for a total of £3,370. Derryboy Jubilee topped the quartet at £1,312 followed by Puppy Derby champion Allardstown Playboy £997, Monarch of the Glen (Easter Cup and double St Leger winner) £619, with finally Slinkey sold for £441. It turned out to be a shrewd piece of business on the part of Stockman because only Derryboy Jubilee claimed further success winning the Wimbledon Gold Cup in 1945.

== Principal races ==
Scottish Greyhound Derby, Carntyne (Jul 1, 525y)
Pos	Name of Greyhound	Trainer	SP	Time	Trap
1st	Gladstone Brigadier	Ken Newham	2-1f	29.55	6
2nd	Farloe Mac	John Hudspeth	5-1	29.95	4
3rd	Castlewood Captain	Cornelius Crowley	6-1	29.99	3
4th	Crystal City	Clapton	6-1	30.03	5
5th	Famous Knight	Leeds	9-4	30.19	2
6th	Crutchy Dan	Warrington	20-1	30.43	1

== Totalisator Returns ==
Extended content

The totalisator returns declared to the licensing authorities for the year 1944 are listed below. Tracks that did not have a totalisator in operation are not listed.

Stadium	Turnover £
London (White City)	7,124,888
London (Harringay)	4,282,064
London (Wembley)	3,965,179
London (Walthamstow)	2,789,450
Birmingham (Perry Barr, old)	1,922,141
London (Clapton)	1,882,284
London (Wimbledon)	1,761,748
Manchester (Belle Vue)	1,669,147
London (Catford)	1,608,090
London (Wandsworth)	1,481,021
London (New Cross)	1,363,863
London (Stamford Bridge)	1,271,822
Glasgow (Shawfield)	1,266,097
Sheffield (Owlerton)	1,173,796
Bradford (Greenfield)	1,125,734
Sheffield (Darnall)	1,118,061
Bristol (Eastville)	1,108,165
Coventry (Lythalls Lane)	1,105,880
Glasgow (White City)	1,101,379
Birmingham (Hall Green)	1,072,079
Edinburgh (Powderhall)	1,028,000
Glasgow (Albion)	1,020,838
Brighton & Hove	963,061
London (Hendon)	961,672
Leicester (Blackbird Rd)	933,797
Manchester (Salford)	873,238
Liverpool (Stanley)	864,618
London (Hackney)	848,306
Liverpool (White City)	841,182
Wolverhampton (Monmore)	836,585
Glasgow (Carntyne)	825,664
London (Park Royal)	809,305
Newcastle (Brough Park)	807,277
Liverpool (Seaforth)	806,681
Romford	765,907
London (Dagenham)	675,273

Stadium	Turnover £
Crayford & Bexleyheath	671,499
Nottingham (White City)	658,441
Birmingham (Kings Heath)	627,053
London (Charlton)	620,065
Southampton	619,247
Blackpool (St Anne's)	616,155
Newcastle (Gosforth)	611,373
Gateshead	556,956
Manchester (White City)	531,481
Norwich (Boundary Park)	530,709
Plymouth	524,202
Slough	523,544
South Shields	519,748
Leeds (Elland Road)	513,745
Hull (Old Craven Park)	489,836
Cardiff (Arms Park)	476,679
Derby	472,484
Portsmouth	463,434
Gloucester & Cheltenham	461,672
Ashington (Co Durham)	457,137
Bradford (City)	446,622
Stoke-on-Trent (Hanley)	446,173
Newcastle (White City)	434,300
Reading (Oxford Road)	421,585
Rochester & Chatham	389,292
Sunderland	379,916
Stanley (Co Durham)	377,109
Middlesbrough	316,056
West Hartlepool	308,509
Preston	305,604
Oxford	294,925
Sheffield (Hyde Park)	272,390
Stoke-on-Trent (Cobridge)	267,916
Bristol (Knowle)	263,023
Newport	261,343
Ipswich	259,335

Stadium	Turnover £
Exeter (Marsh Barton)	255,711
Exeter (County Ground)	249,132
Rochdale	246,884
London (West Ham)	238,959
Houghton-le-Spring	236,343
Long Eaton	222,876
Glasgow (Firhill)	221,665
Bolton	217,975
Aberdeen	183,366
Norwich (City)	178,274
Wigan (Poolstock)	168,839
Edinburgh (Stenhouse)	144,000
Luton	143,425
Warrington	134,761
London (Southall)	123,631
Falkirk (Brockville Park)	123,416
Easington (Co Durham)	113,299
Coundon (Co Durham)	95,668
London (Stratford)	95,642
Doncaster (Spotbrough)	65,554
Wallyford (East Lothian)	62,881
Wishaw (North Lanarks)	60,314
Aldershot	52,833
Rotherham	41,374
Leeds (Parkside)	40,140
Glasgow (Mount Vernon)	38,135
Kingskerswell (Devon)	28,949
Motherwell (Clyde Valley)	28,344
Thornton (Fife)	21,666
Durham City	13,912
Castleford (Whitwood)	11,983
Wombwell (South Yorks)	11,424
Stockport (Hazel Grove)	11,240
Worksop	10,953

Summary

Area	Turnover
London	£ 32,448,244
Rest of England	£ 32,866,695
Wales	£ 738,022
Scotland	£ 4,400,000
Total	£ 70,452,961
