= 1936 UK & Ireland Greyhound Racing Year =

11th year of greyhound racing in the United Kingdom and Ireland

The 1936 UK & Ireland Greyhound Racing Year was the 11th year of greyhound racing in the United Kingdom and the 10th year of greyhound racing in Ireland.

== Summary ==
Britain's leading Greyhound company, the Greyhound Racing Association (GRA) continued to grow and recorded record profits. The operating profit for 1936 was £215,583 (a substantial figure at the time) and attendances at GRA tracks increased from 3,817,934 to 3,849,513 despite the fact that the company held 160 fewer meetings. The GRA then opened Harringay Arena on 10 October, which would become famous for ice hockey and boxing.

At least ten more tracks opened as racing retained its status as a national pastime. Fine Jubilee trained by Marjorie Yate was the star of the year, after winning the 1936 English Greyhound Derby and the Gold Collar.

== Roll of honour ==
Major Winners
Award	Name of Winner
1936 English Greyhound Derby	Fine Jubilee
1936 Irish Greyhound Derby	Minstrel Rover
1936 Scottish Greyhound Derby	Diamond Glory
1936 Welsh Greyhound Derby	Bully Ring

== Tracks ==
The Dolphin Stadium in Slough, was bought by New Clapton Stadium Co. Ltd and they renamed it the Slough Stadium. Rochester and Chatham Sports Stadium opened and was listed as the 55th National Greyhound Racing Club (NGRC) licensed track during 1936. The majority of tracks were independent and nicknamed flapping tracks (unlicensed).

A planned stadium in Barnsley on the Queens Road, with an NGRC application pending which had held whippet racing since 1928 was refused a betting licence.

=== Tracks opened ===
Date	Stadium/Track	Location	ref
April	Thurnscoe Greyhound Racing Track	Thurnscoe	
29 May	Thornton Stadium	Thornton	
1 June	Rochester Stadium	Rochester	
3 June	Dunfermline Greyhound Stadium	Dunfermline	
13 June	Cork Greyhound Stadium	Cork	
7 July	Foresters Park	Tranent	
3 October	Volunteer Park	Armadale	
3 October	Portland Park	Ashington	
unknown	Hinckley Greyhound Stadium	Hinckley	
unknown	Mitcham Stadium	London	

== Competitions ==
Shove Halfpenny won the West Ham Spring Cup, the Wood Lane Stakes at White City and the Daily Mirror Championship. The fawn dog then finished second in the St Leger final, which was won by his kennelmate Ataxy in a national record time of 40.39 for 700 yards. Shove Halfpenny was out of luck again at West Ham Stadium during the Cesarewitch despite winning every round and breaking the track record to get to the final. The final however resulted in the same result when Ataxy won his second classic of the year, Shove Halfpenny failed to record a time after encountering significant trouble in the race.

Towards the end of the year White City staged a one off invitation race simply called "The White City" which was worth £600. The race was won by Pall Mall Stakes champion Safe Rock who beat the Wembley Spring Cup and Wimbledon Spring Cup winner Shandy Gaff into second place. The Derby champion Fine Jubilee finished a disappointing fifth.

== Ireland ==
The first greyhound track in Cork known as The Show Grounds Greyhound Track closed on 20 September 1935, following the decision to relocate to a site nearer the city centre. The site chosen was between Western Road and the north bank of the River Lee near the Wellington Bridge and would be known as Cork Greyhound Stadium. Minstrel Rover won the 1936 Irish Greyhound Derby.

== News ==
Multiple companies emerged, JR Smiths introduced a hurdle with a patent and it was endorsed by the NGRC, it allowed a cushioning effect when greyhounds hit them as they jumped over them. They also made what was called a crush barrier, fencing that surrounded the track and would also cushion a greyhound's impact should they run into it. Mortimers were selling all greyhound necessities and M.S Cable Hare Co Ltd from Belfast made the majority of the hare equipment supplies. Benbow's sold greyhound food and mixtures and medicines and Radiol sold greyhound body wash.

== Principal UK races ==
Grand National, White City (May 23, 525y h)
Pos	Name of Greyhound	Trainer	SP	Time	Trap
1st	Kilganny Bridge	Patrick Higgins	3-1	30.70	1
2nd	Red Car	Joe Harmon	5-1	30.78	2
3rd	Captain Woodcock	Joe Harmon	13-8f	30.86	3
4th	Hawtrey	Robert Linney	9-4	31.02	4

Gold Collar, Catford (May 30, 400y)
Pos	Name of Greyhound	Trainer	SP	Time	Trap
1st	Fine Jubilee	Marjorie Yate	4-5f	26.00	4
2nd	Bearsted	R Bunday	100-7	26.02	1
3rd	Safe Rock	Leslie Reynolds	6-1	26.18	3
4th	Olives Best	Patrick McKinney	33-1	26.20	6
5th	Border Mutton	Paddy McEllistrim	7-1	26.26	2
6th	Kemp	Henry Parsons	7-2	26.28	5

Welsh Derby, White City (Cardiff) (Jul 4, 525y)
Pos	Name of Greyhound	Trainer	SP	Time	Trap
1st	Bully Ring	Robert Linney	4-1	30.28	2
2nd	More Kute	Hugh Kennedy	3-1	30.36	1
3rd	Bachelors Star II	Jackson	4-1	30.40	4
4th	Diploma	D Forward	5-2f	30.43	5
5th	Juryman of Waterhall	Stanley Biss	7-1	30.59	3
6th	Ragalite	Chester	7-1	30.75	6

Scottish Greyhound Derby, Carntyne (Jul 25, 525y)
Pos	Name of Greyhound	Trainer	SP	Time	Trap
1st	Diamond Glory	Ronnie Melville	1-1f	29.99	3
2nd	Tactful Joint	(Warrington)	20-1	30.31	4
3rd	Olives Best	Patrick McKinney	3-1	30.33	6
4th	Deemieope	J Sharples	3-1	30.41	1
5th	Reving Rupert	John W Armstrong	20-1	30.49	2
N/R	Trade Plate	Patrick McKinney			

Scurry Gold Cup, Clapton (Jul 25, 400y)
Pos	Name of Greyhound	Trainer	SP	Time	Trap
1st	Mitzvah	Arthur 'Doc' Callanan	5-2jf	23.29	1
2nd	Curleys Fancy II	Jerry Hannafin	4-1	23.61	3
3rd	Brave Queen	Stanley Biss	4-1	23.85	6
4th	Bearsted	R Bunday	5-2j	24.17	2
5th	Book Reporter	Joe Harmon	100-8	24.57	4
6th	Glistening Frost	Jim Syder Sr.	10-1	24.73	5

Laurels, Wimbledon (Aug 21, 500y)
Pos	Name of Greyhound	Trainer	SP	Time	Trap
1st	Top of the Carlow Road	Sidney Orton	5-2	28.39	1
2nd	Fine Jubilee	Marjorie Yate	10-11f	28.61	4
3rd	Melksham Keystone	Joe Harmon	4-1	28.63	3
4th	Mitzvah	Arthur 'Doc' Callanan	10-1	28.71	5
5th	Fleeting Joule	Marjorie Yate	33-1	28.79	2
N/R	Garrick	Jack Harvey			

St Leger, Wembley (Sep 14, 700y)
Pos	Name of Greyhound	Trainer	SP	Time	Trap
1st	Ataxy	Leslie Reynolds	6-4	40.39	4
2nd	Shove Ha'penny	Jack Harvey	4-5f	40.63	3
3rd	Mick the Courtier	Jim Syder Sr.	66-1	40.95	6
4th	Top of the Carlow Road	Sidney Orton	8-1	41.31	2
5th	Mick the Moocher	Sidney Orton	20-1	41.55	1
6th	Strappado	Tom Lightfoot	66-1	41.79	5

Oaks, White City (Sep 19, 525y, £300)
Pos	Name of Greyhound	Trainer	SP	Time	Trap
1st	Genial Radiance	Austin Hiscock	4-6f	29.86	1
2nd	Joy of Waterhall	Leslie Reynolds	7-2	30.34	6
3rd	Mick the Conundrum	Sidney Orton	8-1	30.82	3
4th	Hussys First	Robert Forster	10-1	30.98	2
5th	Another Trier	Wilf France	100-6	31.30	4
6th	Flawless Jewel	Arch Whitcher	100-6	31.38	5

Cesarewitch, West Ham (Nov 9, 600y)
Pos	Name of Greyhound	Trainer	SP	Time	Trap
1st	Ataxy	Leslie Reynolds	2-1	31.24	2
2nd	Safe Rock	Fred Wilson	8-1	31.48	6
3rd	Shandy Gaff	Sidney Orton	4-1	31.50	1
4th	Book Reporter	Joe Harmon	100-6	31.54	3
5th	Juryman of Waterhall	Stanley Biss	50-1	31.94	4
6th	Shove Ha'penny	Jack Harvey	11-8f	00.00	5

The White City White City (Nov 21, 550y, £600)
Pos	Name of Greyhound	Trainer	SP	Time	Trap
1st	Safe Rock	Fred Wilson	15-2	31.21	
2nd	Shandy Gaff	Sidney Orton	8-1	31.61	
3rd	Shove Ha'penny	Jack Harvey	9-4jf	31.65	
4th	Ataxy	Leslie Reynolds	3-1	31.73	
5th	Fine Jubilee	Marjorie Yate	9-4jf	32.93	
6th	Roving Spring	Joe Harmon	100-7	00.00	

== Key ==
U = unplaced
TR = Track Record
