= 1938 English Greyhound Derby =

- Location: White City Stadium
- Start date: 9 June
- End date: 25 June
- Total prize money: £1,250 (winner)

The 1938 Greyhound Derby took place during June with the final being held on 25 June 1938 at White City Stadium.

The winner Lone Keel received a first prize of £1,250 and was trained by Sydney W Wright and owned by Jack Walsh and William Hill.

== Final result ==
At White City (over 525 yards):

Position	Name of Greyhound	Breeding	Trap	SP	Time	Trainer
1st	Lone Keel	Lone Man - Lucky Plum	3	9-4	29.62	Sydney W Wright (Private)
2nd	Melksham Numeral	Melksham Ivan - Melksham Ivy	1	8-1	29.66	Bert Heyes (White City - London)
3rd	Wattle Bark	Secret Chance - Helena Kane	4	20-1	29.67	Jim Syder Sr. (Wembley)
4th	Bealtime	Nora's Cutlet - Eagles Reel	6	100-6	30.07	Joe Harmon (White City - London)
5th	Demotic Mack	Beef Cutlet - Kaiti Hill	2	7-2	30.23	Charles Cross (Clapton)
6th	Manhattan Magic	Creamery Border - Deemsters Olive	5	7-4f	00.00	Sydney W Wright (Private)

=== Distances ===
½, short-head, 5, 2, DNF (lengths)
The distances between the greyhounds are in finishing order and shown in lengths. From 1927 to 1950 one length was equal to 0.06 of one second but race times are shown as 0.08 as per modern day calculations.

== Competition Report ==
Only one bitch called Beckbury Moth was among the 37 nominations for the 1938 running of the classic. The event became all male when Beckbury Moth was scratched before the first round.

Wattle Bark returned to defend the title he won in 1937 but had suffered a serious shoulder injury early in the year and was not considered a contender. Jack Walsh owner of the London track Staines Greyhound Stadium was in greyhound partnership with fellow bookmaker William Hill and the pair had two contenders in Manhattan Midnight and Lone Keel trained by Wright. They were both very fast greyhounds but Lone Keel despite breaking many track records had failed to win any of the five major finals he had appeared in.

When the first round began Manhattan Midnight won in fast 29.34 and Lone Keel also won in 29.60. Wattle Bark finished third in a re-run in his heat but still qualified. The second round mirrored the first round with two more wins for Manhattan Midnight 29.25, just half a length off the track record and Lone Keel recorded 29.43.

In the first semi-final the Northern Flat and London Cup champion Demotic Mack took the early lead before Manhattan Midnight overtook him to win in 29.38. The second semi was won by kennelmate Lone Keel in 29.39 from Melksham Numeral in second place, Wattle Bark claimed a place in the final by crossing the line in third place.

The kennelmates had reached the final unbeaten with semi-final wins just one spot (0.01 sec) apart but the bookies sent Manhattan Midnight off at 7-4 favourite. More than 90,000 people attended the final. As the traps opened Melksham Numeral led until the first bend where Lone Keel overtook him and went on to win the race. Wattle Bark took up second place but lost it again to Melksham Numeral at the third bend. The favourite Manhattan Midnight missed the break completely and found trouble before falling.

== See also ==
- 1938 UK & Ireland Greyhound Racing Year
