= Tamworth Speedway =

British motorcycle speedway team

Club information
- Track address: Tamworth Greyhound Stadium; Watling/Lichfield Street; Fazeley near Tamworth; Staffordshire
- Country: England
- Founded: 1932
- Closed: 1950
- League: National League Division Three

Major team honours
Midlands / South Cup	1947

Tamworth Speedway were a British motorcycle speedway team who operated at three venues between 1932 and 1950. During the years of league competition they were based at Tamworth Greyhound Stadium, Fazeley, near Tamworth.

== History ==
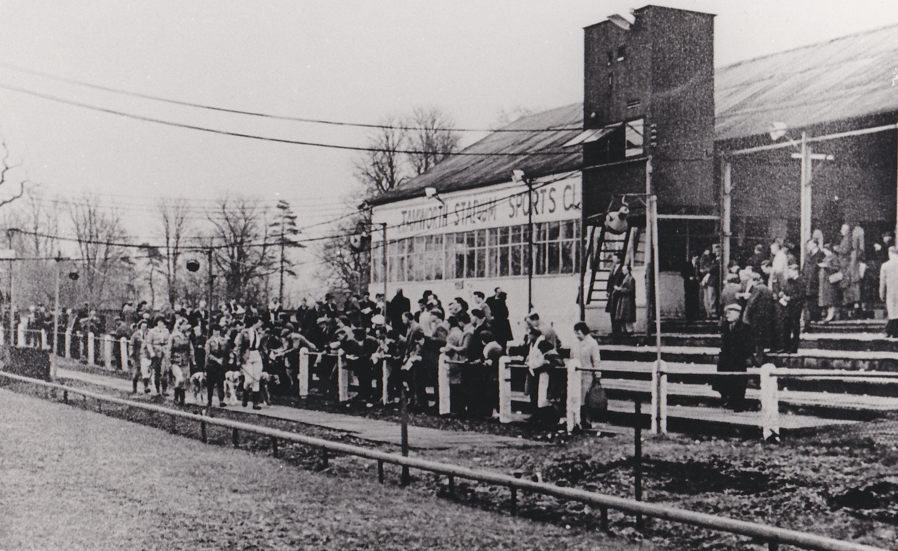
Tamworth Greyhound Stadium c.1950

Speedway in Tamworth began in 1932 at two venues; the first was Mile Oak Speedway on Sutton Road, Mile Oak and had a circuit of 360 yards and began on 28 March 1932. The track located behind Long Wood Bridge and Farm held eight fixtures during 1932.

In August of the same year a second venue opened on Fazeley Road and held 12 meetings. Both promoted just open meetings and held no affiliation to league speedway at the time. Both tracks continued to host meetings throughout 1933 but only Mile Oak continued afterwards from 1934 to 1935.

In 1947, Tamworth entered a speedway team in the leagues for the first time, with a new venue for speedway chosen at the Tamworth Greyhound Stadium. They were known as the Tamworth greyhounds or hounds and finished fifth in the 1947 Speedway National League Division Three but won the Midlands / South Cup defeating Eastbourne in the final. After a slight improvement in 1948 (4th) and 1949 (3rd) they began the 1950 season with a new name of Tamworth Tammies.

The 1950 season would be their last, with the team finishing sixth in the 1950 Speedway National League Division Three but reaching the Division three Knockout Cup final, losing to Oxford Cheetahs in the final. The demise of speedway in Tamworth was blamed on a lack of support by promoter Les Marshall.

== Season summary ==
Year and league	Position	Notes
1947 Speedway National League Division Three	5th	Greyhounds/hounds
1948 Speedway National League Division Three	4th	Greyhounds/hounds
1949 Speedway National League Division Three	3rd	Greyhounds/hounds
1950 Speedway National League Division Three	6th	Tammies

== Notable riders ==
- Harry Bastable
- Eric Boothroyd
