= 1936 Irish Greyhound Derby =

Dog racing event

- Venue: Harold's Cross Stadium
- Location: Dublin
- End date: 28 August
- Total prize money: Winner £320

The 1936 Irish Greyhound Derby took place during August with the final being held at Harold's Cross Stadiumin Dublin on August 28.

The winner Minstrel Rover won £320 and was owned and trained by Michael Sheehan. The trophy was presented by the Lord Mayor, the Right Honorable Alfie Byrne.

== Final result ==
At Harolds Cross, 28 August (over 525 yards):

| Position | Name of Greyhound | Breeding | Trap | SP | Time | Trainer |
|---|---|---|---|---|---|---|
| 1st | Minstrel Rover | Dick the Rover - Hogans Choice | 1 | 3-1cf | 30.48 | Michael Sheehan |
| 2nd | Negro's Equal | Slanebeg - Caw's Nonnie | 4 | 3-1cf | 30.52 | |
| 3rd | Bhang | | 3 | 4-1 | 30.60 | |
| unplaced | Good Trump | Eagle's Beak - Good One | | 10-1 | | Yeates |
| unplaced | Moresby | Roving Bunty – False Colleen | | 3-1cf | | |
| unplaced | Toll the Bell | Other Days - Sauce Bottle | | 10-1 | | Yeates |

=== Distances ===
½, 1

== Competition Report ==
First season owner trainer Michael Sheehan purchased two greyhounds for £85 one of which was a greyhound called Minstrel Rover. In the first round Negro's Equal went fastest in 30.29 and in round two Negro's Equal carried Minstrel Rover wide which allowed Formal Hope to win in 30.33. In the first semi-final Minstrel Rover defeated Negro's Equal in 30.33 before Formal Hope was eliminated and Good Trump defeated Bhang by six lengths.

In the final Minstrel Rover held off a strong finish from the unlucky Negro's Equal. Bhang finished third with Irish St Leger champion Moresby unplaced.

== See also ==
1936 UK & Ireland Greyhound Racing Year
