= 1947 Irish Greyhound Derby =

- Venue: Harold's Cross Stadium
- Location: Dublin
- End date: 15 August
- Total prize money: £500 (winner)

The 1947 Irish Greyhound Derby took place during July and August with the final being held at Harold's Cross Stadium in Dublin on 15 August 1947.

The winner Daring Flash won £500 and was owned, bred and trained by Mary d'Arcy from Kilternan and became the first winner to be sired by a previous Derby champion.

== Final result ==
At Harold's Cross, 15 August (over 525 yards):

Position	Name of Greyhound	Breeding	Trap	SP	Time	Trainer
1st	Daring Flash	Tanist - Daring Lady	4	5-2jf	30.04	Mary d’Arcy
2nd	Paddys Elbow	Well Squared - Elbow Lane Queen	2	4-1	30.20	
3rd	Note Him	breeding unknown	6	5-1	30.44	
4th	Darcel	Ruby Border - City Dance	5	6-1		Bluett
5th	Hailes Gate	breeding unknown	1	5-2jf		
6th	Baytown Ivy	Manhattan Midnight - Ulster Row	4	7-2		Paddy Barry

=== Distances ===
2, 3 (lengths)

== Competition Report ==
During the second round Faugh A Ballah clocked 29.91, with other fast heat winners being Darcel (30.08), Little Arthurstown (30.12) and Pedlars Pet (30.40).

In the semi-finals Baytown Ivy defeated Paddys Elbow by four lengths in 30.08; Darcel beat Note Him by half a length and the Callanan Cup champion Daring Flash won from Hailes Gate in 30.02, also by half a length.

In the final the track specialist Daring Flash broke well alongside Paddys Elbow and the pair vied for the lead until the latter tired. Note Him ran on well to take third place from Darcel.

== See also ==
1947 UK & Ireland Greyhound Racing Year
