= Skimpot =

Suburb of Luton, England

Coordinates: 51.88793°N 0.47653°W

- Location within Bedfordshire
- OS grid reference: TL049221
- Unitary authority: Luton
- Ceremonial county: Bedfordshire
- Region: East
- Country: England
- Sovereign state: United Kingdom
- Post town: LUTON
- Postcode district: LU4 / LU1
- Dialling code: 01582
- Police: Bedfordshire
- Fire: Bedfordshire
- Ambulance: East of England
- UK Parliament: Luton South

Skimpot is a suburb of Luton, in Bedfordshire, England. The area is roughly bounded by Dunstable Road to the north, Hatters Way to the south, Skimpot Road to the west, and the M1 to the east.

Originally a small rural settlement, Skimpot was engulfed by the expanding town of Luton in the mid 20th century. Skimpot Road forms part of the border between Luton and Dunstable.

== History ==
The east side of Skimpot was the former site of Luton Stadium, a former greyhound racing stadium. The stadium was constructed in 1931 and racing continued there until 1973. The site is now an industrial estate.

== Politics ==
Skimpot makes up the south-west area of Challney ward, which is represented by Cllr Khtija Malik (Labour), Cllr Tahir Malik (Labour) and Cllr Tom Shaw (Labour).

The ward forms part of the parliamentary constituency of Luton North, whose MP is Sarah Owen (Labour).

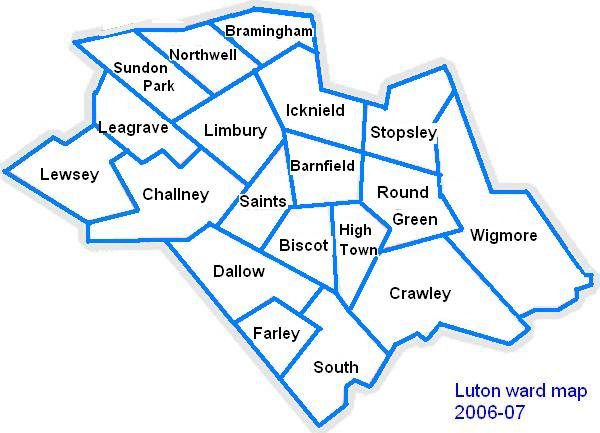
Map of Luton showing Challney ward
