= 1944 Irish Greyhound Derby =

- Venue: Shelbourne Park
- Location: Dublin
- End date: August 12
- Total prize money: £500 (winner)

The 1944 Irish Greyhound Derby took place during July and August with the final being held at Shelbourne Park in Dublin on 12 August.

The winner Clonbonny Bridge won £500 and was owned and trained by A O'Neill.

== Final result ==
At Shelbourne Park, 12 August (over 525 yards):

Position	Name of Greyhound	Breeding	Trap	SP	Time	Trainer
1st	Clonbonny Bridge	Melksham Nobody - Bridge of Avon	1	7-2	30.53	A O'Neill
2nd	Down Signal	Castledown Lad - Signal Post	2	2-1jf	30.55	Tom Lynch
3rd	Lively Breeze	Bellas Jim - Harem Lady	5	8-1	30.67	McConnell
4th	Laurel Fidget	breeding unknown	3	2-1jf		John O'Keefe
5th	Final Party	breeding unknown	4	8-1		
6th	Mallacka	breeding unknown	6	10-1		John O'Keefe

=== Distances ===
head, 1½ (lengths)

== Competition Report ==
The 1944 Irish Derby was considered the best entry to date with a greyhound called Mad Tanist owned by Jack McAllister being given the tag of ante-post favourite. Famous Knight the 1943 winner would not defend his title after leaving for England previously. Mad Tanist son of Tanist, won his first round defeating Clonbonny Bridge by a remarkable ten lengths in 30.20. Irish Puppy Derby winner Fawn Cherry was second fastest in 30.25, the fawn dog had just returned from London after eight months there.

In the second round Mad Tanist once again impressed in 29.86 followed by an improving Clonbonny Bridge and Fawn Cherry. Other heat winners were Laurel Fidget (30.15), Down Signal (30.34) and Lively Breeze (30.34). In the second semi-final Mad Tanist at odds of 4-9 and Fawn Cherry both went out after awful trouble at the first bend in a race won by 25-1 shot Mallacks in 30.38. The first semi had gone to Laurel Fidget who defeated Clonbonny Bridge and Lively Breeze in 30.20.

In a controversial final Laurel Fidget led from Down Signal until the third bend which left Down Signal clear but after he swung wide on the run-in Clonbonny Bridge made ground and the pair crossed the finish line together. Clonbonny Bridge was given the verdict by the stewards but it was a result which many disputed.

== See also ==
- 1944 UK & Ireland Greyhound Racing Year
