= Wheatley Hill =

Coordinates: 54.7431°N 1.4176°W

- Location within County Durham
- Population: 3,144 (2011)
- OS grid reference: NZ 376 388
- Unitary authority: County Durham
- Ceremonial county: Durham
- Region: North East
- Country: England
- Sovereign state: United Kingdom
- Post town: DURHAM
- Postcode district: DH6
- Dialling code: 01429
- Police: Durham
- Fire: County Durham and Darlington
- Ambulance: North East
- UK Parliament: Easington

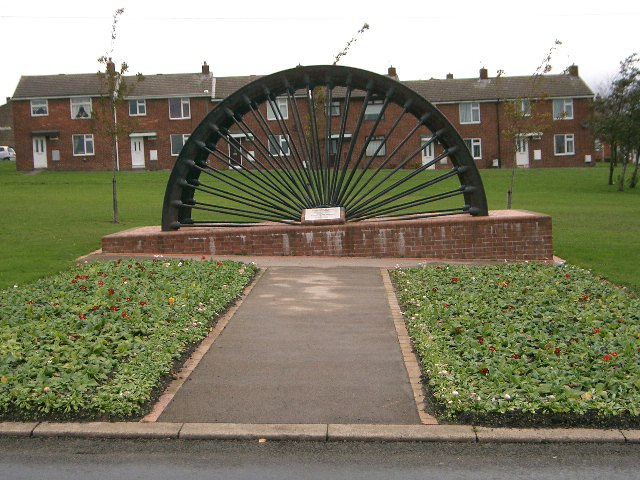
Wheatley Hill

Wheatley Hill is a village in County Durham, in England. It is situated to the west of Peterlee, near Thornley and Wingate. Until 2009, it was part of Easington District. It is home to the Wheatley Hill greyhound racing stadium, which closed in 2019 after a fire.
