= 1938 Irish Greyhound Derby =

- Venue: Harold's Cross Stadium
- Location: Dublin
- End date: August 8

The 1938 Irish Greyhound Derby took place during July and August with the final being held at Harold's Cross Stadium in Dublin on August 8.

The winner Abbeylara was owned by Tom Black.

== Final result ==
At Harold's Cross, 8 August (over 525 yards):

Position	Name of Greyhound	Breeding	Trap	SP	Time	Trainer
1st	Abbeylara	Prudent Turn - That's The Why	2	4-7f	30.09	Tom Black
2nd	Manozzi	White Sandills - Feale Wave	1	5-1	30.73	
3rd	Lemon Picker	breeding unknown	6	8-1	30.77	
4th	Brave Leader	breeding unknown	4	4-1		
5th	Bread Sweeper	Stockwell Street - Bonny	5	10-1		R M Brosnan
6th	Clountabonive (reserve)	breeding unknown	3	100-8		

=== Distances ===
8, ½

== Competition Report ==
In the first round the St Leger and Easter Cup champion Abbeylara justified his ante-post favourite tag by winning easily but then lost in round two beaten by The Grove trained by Mick Horan. In the semi-finals Abbeylara got back to winning ways beating Manozzi in 30.33. Brave Leader won heat two from Lemon Picker and the third and final semi went to Bread Sweeper beat Dark Wife but the latter was disqualified for fighting and his place was taken by the third-place finisher Clountabonive Queen.

In the final Abbeylara controlled the race leading all the way and stretching his lead to win by eight lengths.

== See also ==
- 1938 UK & Ireland Greyhound Racing Year
