= 1936 English Greyhound Derby =

- Location: White City Stadium
- Start date: 9 June
- End date: 27 June
- Total prize money: £1,000 (winner)

The 1936 Greyhound Derby took place during June with the final being held on 27 June 1936 at White City Stadium. The winner Fine Jubilee, owned and trained by Marjorie Yate, received a first prize of £1,000.

== Final result ==
At White City (over 525 yards):

Position	Name of Greyhound	Breeding	Trap	SP	Time	Trainer
1st	Fine Jubilee	Silver Seal - Harissi	3	10-11f	29.48	Marjorie Yate (Private)
2nd	Itchok	Cheerful Wellan - Model Lady	5	8-1	29.96	Arthur 'Doc'Callanan (Wembley)
3rd	Curleys Fancy II	Mutton Cutlet - Delenette	4	6-1	30.00	Jerry Hannafin (Wimbledon)
4th	Raven Arms	Danielli - Hathemara	2	33-1	30.16	Leslie Reynolds (White City - London)
5th	Grand Flight II	Naughty Jack Horner - Little Fawn Biddy	1	5-2	30.20	Jim Syder Sr. (Wembley)
6th	Diamond Glory	Kilnaglory - Ten Diamonds	6	33-1	30.52	Ronnie Melville (Private)

=== Distances ===
6, ½, 2, ½, 4 (lengths)
The distances between the greyhounds are in finishing order and shown in lengths. From 1927-1950 one length was equal to 0.06 of one second but race times are shown as 0.08 as per modern day calculations.

== Review ==
Second season trainer Marjorie Yate aimed three greyhounds at the 1936 Derby, they were Fleeting Joule, Flying Joule and Gold Collar champion Fine Jubilee; the latter was installed as 6-1 ante-post favourite. Yate lived in a twenty acre country estate in Winkfield near Bracknell.

The opening heat was one of strongest ever experienced, with Ataxy claiming the win in a fast 29.60 from 4-7 shot Fine Jubilee, the 1935 English Greyhound Derby ante-post favourite Curleys Fancy II; Roving Spring was eliminated. The bookmakers experienced a good first round as defending champion Greta Ranee and Pall Mall Stakes champion Shove Halfpenny were both eliminated.

The second round saw a re-match between Ataxy and Fine Jubilee which resulted in a good win for Fine Jubilee at 9-4 in a time of 29.47. Ataxy claimed second place but finished with an injured toe. Yate had a great round as both Fleeting Joule and Flying Joule qualified for the semi-finals.

Fine Jubilee impressed with a 29.49 semi-final win by a distance; trouble behind saw Diamond Glory and Raven Arms qualify for the final. Curleys Fancy II won the second semi-final from Grand Flight II and Itchok; Ataxy carrying a minor injury under performed and could not make the final.

In the final Fine Jubilee went off a very well supported 10-11. A record crowd of just under 90,000 watched as Fine Jubilee and Curleys Fancy II broke well. The two vied for the lead as Grand Flight II took a bump which enabled Fine Jubilee to go ahead, he was challenged halfway by Itchok before pulling away and winning by six lengths in 29.48, the fastest time ever recorded in a final.

== See also ==
- 1936 UK & Ireland Greyhound Racing Year
