= Mansfield Woodhouse Greyhound Stadium =

Greyhound racing stadium in Mansfield, England

- Location: Old Mill Lane, Mansfield Woodhouse, Nottinghamshire
- Coordinates: 53°09′30″N 1°10′42″W
- Opened: 1948
- Closed: 1961

Mansfield Woodhouse Greyhound Stadium was a greyhound racing stadium between Mansfield Woodhouse and Mansfield in Nottinghamshire.

== Origins ==
The stadium was constructed south of Mansfield Woodhouse and on the north east side of Mansfield. It was located off Old Mill Lane between the lane and the Mansfield Corporation sewage works sludge beds.

== History ==
The greyhound racing was independent (unaffiliated to a governing body) and served the local mining community. The track opened after the war and opened for racing on 11 Dec 1948 and was overseen by Mr. C. Faulkner (managing director). It was listed as having a 5,000 capacity.

The track remained open until around 1961 and it is believed that the Duchess of Portland attended races there.

The site today is occupied by the Tall Trees Mobile Home Park.
