= Marsh Barton Priory =

Priory in Devon, England (12th–16th century)

Coordinates: 50.707768°N 3.526644°W

Marsh Barton Priory, otherwise the Priory of St Mary de Marisco or St Mary of the Marsh, was a cell of Augustinian Canons in Marsh Barton, Exeter, Devon, England.

It was founded in the mid-12th century. Although a small house, it owned a fair amount of property in and around Exeter. It was dissolved in 1539 having been sold to Sir Richard Pollard in 1538. The site seems to have been used mostly as a source of building stone. In the 20th century a "very ordinary and somewhat dilapidated" farmhouse stood there, but was demolished. The site is now part of a trading estate and no traces of the priory remain, but carved stone fragments from it occur around Plympton.

== See also ==
- Exeter Cathedral
- Exeter monastery
