= Exeter Greyhound Stadium =

Greyhound racing stadium in Exeter

Exeter Stadium
- Location: Marsh Barton, Exeter
- Coordinates: 50°42′31″N 3°31′51″W
- Opened: 1928
- Closed: 1957

Exeter Greyhound Stadium, also known as the Marsh Barton Stadium, was a greyhound racing stadium in Marsh Barton, Exeter.

It is not to be confused with the County Ground Stadium that also hosted independent greyhound racing from 1930 to 1986 and speedway from 1945 to 1951.

== Origins and opening ==
Marsh Barton south of Exeter and north of Alphington consisted of the former Marsh Barton Priory also known as St Marys Priory (home to Augustinian canons regular) and Marsh Barton Lane which led to the Priory and Cottage at the turn of the 20th century. Either side to west and east were the Teign Valley line and Great Western Railway respectively; the former swung in a westerly direction towards Ide whilst the latter made its way south to Dawlish.

The site was selected as the ideal place for a new greyhound track with the nearby catchment area of Exeter. The stadium was constructed along the south side of Marsh Barton Lane and consisted of four buildings on the home straight. Racing began Saturday 21 July 1928 and was hailed as a success by the local press. The venue was initially known as Oak Marsh before Marsh Barton was used. The first ever winner was Mr Tolkien's Sparks. The promoter was Mr J Bonus but the track was independent (unaffiliated to a governing body) at this stage.

== History ==
The racing continued over the following years until Mr Henry James Shooter the chief steward at Marsh Barton took over the betting licence in 1935. The nearby County Ground Stadium in Exeter (formerly the Devon County Athletic Ground) also hosted greyhound racing from 1935 and became a serious rival for Marsh Barton by consistently pulling in larger crowds.

After the Second World War the decision was made to race under National Greyhound Racing Club (NGRC) rules for the first time, with the events being conducted on Tuesday, Thursday and Friday nights. The final independent race took place on 14 Sep 1946 with first NGRC race just two weeks later on 28 September 1946. During 1948 the NGRC experimented with an open kennel system at the track; it was the first time that greyhounds were able to be trained by their owners instead of resident trainers, in addition private trainers were allowed to enter for graded races.

Speedway took place from the period 1945-1951 although the rival County Ground Stadium became the home to the Exeter Falcons speedway team until 2005. The greyhound track was described as an average size course, 456 yards in circumference with an 'Inside Sumner' hare. Distances raced were 300, 500, 525, 700 yards with hurdle events over 525 & 525 yards. All greyhounds were kennelled at the track with four trainers and room for 150 dogs.

In November 1949 the track once again became independent due to increased costs brought about by being a member of the NGRC and the fact that many of Marsh Barton's independent fraternity had switched allegiance to the County Ground. Major problems arose in 1950 when the track announced significant losses and went into receivership. Attempting to sell the track at auction was initially a disaster because the valuation of £42,500 was not met. The bidding stopped at £22,000, well below the reserve, it was decided that the 16 acres would be sold privately.

== Closure ==
The stadium operated for just seven more years before finally closing its doors in November 1957, it was demolished making way for development on an expanding trading estate.

== Track records ==
Distance yards	Greyhound	Time	Date
500	Belvedere Ace	29.98	1947
525	Mighty Al	30.15	1947
700	Northam Star	41.44	1947
