= Dunfermline (Milesmark) Greyhound Stadium =

Scottish racing stadium

- Location: Milesmark, north-west Dunfermline, Fife, Scotland
- Coordinates: 56°04′47″N 3°29′37″W
- Opened: 1936

The Dunfermline (Milesmark) Greyhound Stadium was a greyhound racing stadium in the village of Milesmark, north-west of Dunfermline, Fife, Scotland

The race track was opened by West Fife Stadium Ltd on 3 June 1936 and was originally known as the Western Greyhound Race Track. The stadium was built on top of an old quarry and was sometimes referred to as the Old Quarry Stadium. The exact location was on the west side of Targate Road and the back straight ran parallel with the railway line. The track was independent (unaffiliated to a governing body) and was still trading in 1949 with a betting licence. The exact date of closure is unknown.
