= Huntingdon Greyhound Stadium =

Former dog racing track

- Location: Huntingdon, Cambridgeshire
- Coordinates: 52°20′58″N 0°10′13″W
- Opened: 1947
- Closed: 1993

Huntingdon Greyhound Stadium was a greyhound racing stadium in Huntingdon, Cambridgeshire.

== Origins ==
The site chosen for the greyhound track in 1947 was to the north of Huntingdon in a small village called Sapley. It was constructed south of the Kings Ripton Road adjacent to the west side of Sapley Road (originally Sapley Lane).

== Opening ==
The track's circumference was a small 380 yards and was described as a tight circuit with a maximum capacity of just 500 spectators. Originally running race distances over 260 & 460 yards, the first Proprietor & Racing Manager was B.Morehen who resided at Phylbern Kennels in the nearby village of Graveley. Initial trials were arranged for September 1947, with the opening meeting being held on Saturday, 20 September 1947, at 3pm.

== History ==
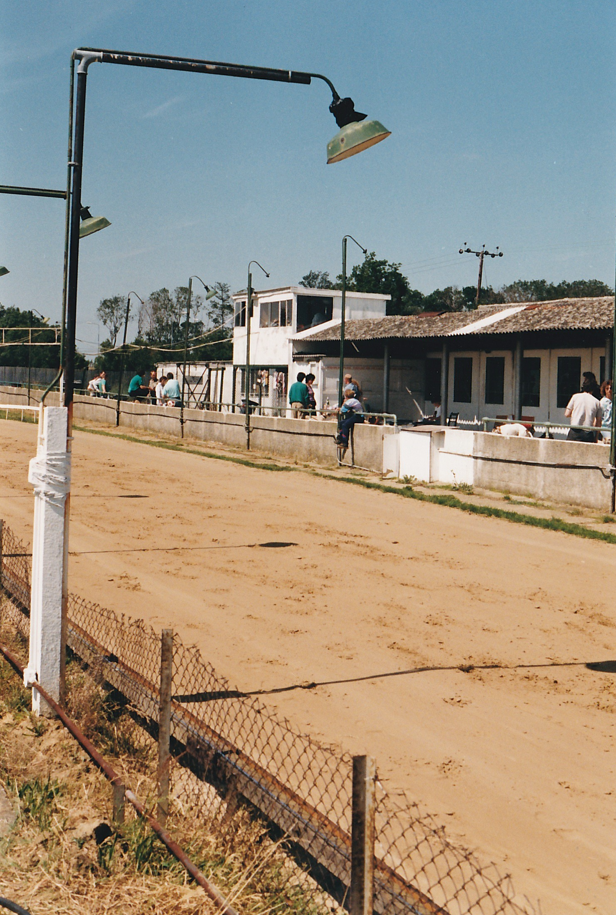
Huntingdon Greyhound Stadium c.1985

The stadium traded as an independent (unaffiliated to a governing body) track. Morehen conducted his own rules that included all greyhounds having to have a trial within eight race meetings, and should a greyhound find too much time, the race would be voided and re-run without the offending greyhound. During the 1960s, Monday and Friday night racing took place on an all-grass track with distances of 330, 440, and 710 yards behind an 'Inside Sumner' hare. By 1980, Friday night racing had changed to Thursday night racing, and regular open races featured events called the Hunt Cup, Derby, Cambridgeshire, St Leger & Cesarewitch (not the official National Greyhound Racing Club (NGRC) licensed races).

The NGRC offered the chance for independent tracks to join a new permit scheme in the early 1970s, but only six tracks decided to take the option because of the added costs and legislation involved. However, the permit scheme remained open, and on 10 July 1984, Huntingdon joined. One of the requirements was the building of 64 on-site racing kennels, and the Racing Manager under NGRC rules was Mrs S.Johnston.

In April 1986, the permit licence was withdrawn by the NGRC for failure to adhere to their rules (mainly concerning unlicensed staff) but the track continued to trade as an independent under owners Alan Chalkley, C Reeves & P Curtis. Race nights consisted of Tuesday, Wednesday and Friday evenings and distances were 70, 245, 410, 585 and 750 metres.

== Closure ==
The stadium closed on 18 May 1993, becoming part of the recreation ground and then a housing estate on Burnett Way & Lamport Drive.
