= Denny Stadium =

Sports venue in Falkirk, Scotland

- Location: Denny, Falkirk council area, formerly Stirlingshire, Scotland
- Coordinates: 56°01′10″N 3°55′20″W
- Opened: 1938
- Closed: 1961

Denny Stadium was a greyhound racing track in Denny, in the Falkirk council area, formerly in the county of Stirlingshire. Scotland.

Joseph Bryson applied for planning permission in 1938 and it was granted by Stirling County Council. The track was located by Hallhouse Farm in west Denny, south of the Herbertshire Colliery pit number two.

The track was independent (unlicensed) and racing took place from 9 July 1938 until 1961. The stadium site was demolished before the M80 motorway was constructed through the site in 1974.
