= Larkhill Stadium =

Greyhound racing venue in Yeovil, England

- Location: Larkhill Road, north Yeovil, south Somerset
- Coordinates: 50°57′10″N 2°39′26″W
- Opened: 1947
- Closed: 1972

Larkhill Stadium was a greyhound racing stadium on Larkhill Road in north Yeovil, south Somerset

== Origins ==
The Larkhill Stadium was constructed in 1947 on the east side of Larkhill Road and the south side of Greenwood Road on fields that formed part of Larkhill Farm.

== Opening ==
The greyhound racing started in 1947 and the greyhound racing was independent (not affiliated to the sports governing body the National Greyhound Racing Club). It was known as a flapping track which was the nickname given to independent tracks.

== History ==
The stadium was able to accommodate 20,000 people and facilities included a licensed club and bar. Racing was on Tuesday and Friday evenings at 7.30pm. The track circumference was 430 yards with race distances of 330, 530 and 730 yards and the hare system was an 'Inside Sumner' and annual events called the Somerset Derby, Somerset Cesarewitch, Charrington Cup and Mayors Cup took place. There were ten on course bookmakers.

Stock car racing and local football also took place at the stadium.

== Closure ==
In 1971 planning applications for housing were submitted and the track closed in November 1972. By 1974 the stadium had been demolished and the housing called Larkspur Crescent had been built.
