= Jesmond Dene Stadium =

Greyhound racing stadium in Wales

- Location: Queen Victoria Street, Tredegar, Blaenau Gwent, southeast Wales.
- Coordinates: 51°46′18″N 3°15′12″W
- Opened: 1948
- Closed: 1960s

The Jesmond Dene Greyhound Stadium was a greyhound racing stadium in Tredegar, Blaenau Gwent, southeast Wales.

The stadium was situated on the north side of Queen Victoria Street and Gainsborough Way and was accessed near to where both roads meet. The stadium was built on the disused Tredegar No7 water balance coal pit known as Mountain Pit (one of the deepest in Europe).

The track was built in the 1948 and was owned by Charlie Hill a bus proprietor. He named the stadium for his wife Emrys presumed to be after the Jesmond Dene gardens in Newcastle. It was used for greyhound racing and rugby before being becoming a depot for buses. The track was independent (unaffiliated to a governing body) and closed in the 1960s.

The site today is a scrap metal site used for old cars.
