= Marsh Barton =

Coordinates: 50.704°N 3.522°W

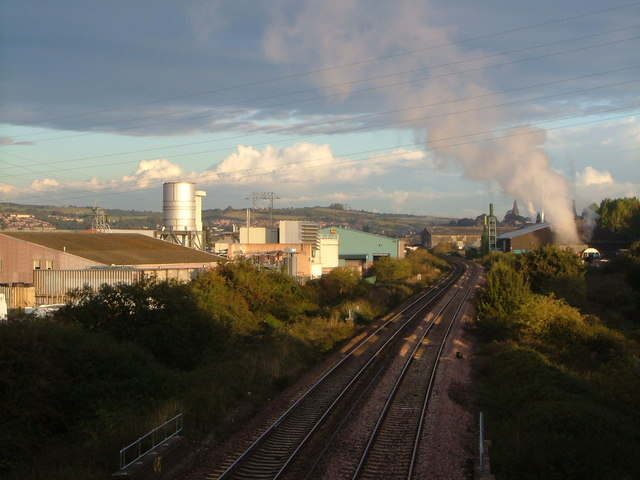
The Riviera Line through Marsh Barton

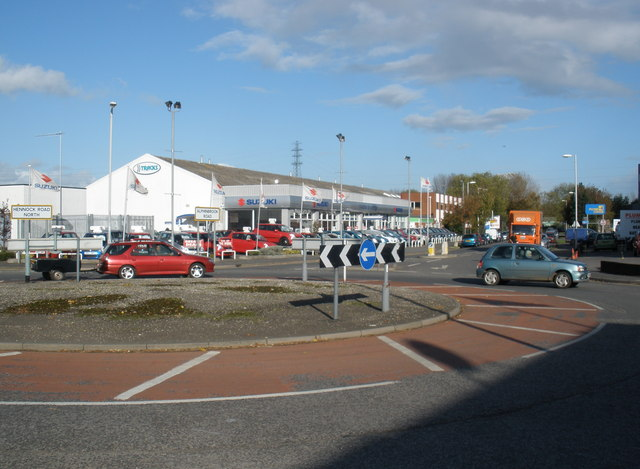
Roundabout on the Marsh Barton estate

Marsh Barton is the largest trading estate in Exeter, covering over 1.2 square miles (3.1 km^{2}). It supports over 500 diverse businesses including one of Europe's largest motoring centres, showrooms, city plumbing, builders merchants, and tool and plant hire. It is also home to the head office of the Apple Premium Reseller, Stormfront Retail Ltd.

A new railway station to serve Marsh Barton was opened on 4th July 2023.

== History ==
Marsh Barton was a medieval village south of Exeter and north of Alphington. At the turn of the 20th century the main part of Marsh Barton was the former Marsh Barton Priory, also known as St Marys Priory (home to Augustinian Canons Regular). On the west and east was the Exeter railway and Great Western Railway respectively, the former swung in a westerly direction whilst the latter made its way south to Dawlish.

The site was selected for a new greyhound track in 1928, and racing continued until 1957 when it was demolished.
