= Irvine Caledonian Stadium =

Sports venue in Irvine, Scotland

- Location: Irvine, North Ayrshire Scotland
- Coordinates: 55°37′05″N 4°39′45″W
- Opened: 1933
- Closed: 1993

Irvine Caledonian Stadium was a greyhound racing stadium in Irvine, North Ayrshire, Scotland.

The first greyhound meeting at Irvine took place on 21 August 1933. Known as the Caledonian Stadium it was located between Bank Street and Quarry Road. It is not to be confused with the location of a football ground and running track that was built adjacent on the north side some years later. The track which was independent (unlicensed) was 400 yards in circumference resulting in race distances of 120, 325, 525 and 725 yards with an uphill finish. The main event was the Marymass Handicap and there were two covered stands and kennels for 48 greyhounds. Racing was held on Thursday evening and Saturday afternoon and the hare was an Outside McKee Scott. It was one of two greyhound tracks in Irvine, the other being the Townhead Greyhound Track. The racing at the Caledonian Stadium ended in 1993.

Both the football ground and the greyhound stadium have since been demolished and form the west area of a large recreation park.
