= William Hill (businessman) =

English businessman (1903–1971)

- Born: 16 July 1903; Birmingham, England
- Died: 15 October 1971 (aged 68); Newmarket, England
- Occupation: Bookmaker
- Years active: 1934–1970
- Title: Founder of William Hill
- Children: 2

William Hill (16 July 1903 – 15 October 1971) was an English businessman who was the founder of William Hill, the British bookmaking firm.

Born in Birmingham, Hill left school at the age of twelve to work on his uncle's farm. While working in a factory in Birmingham he started collecting illegal bets from local people on his motorcycle. In 1919, Hill joined the Royal Irish Constabulary (Cork East Riding - and is documented on the RIC records as such) as a driver while underage (16) and was stationed in Mallow, County Cork, Ireland.

After the hopeless failure of his first foray into bookmaking, he moved to London in 1929 where he started taking bets on greyhounds before opening an illicit gambling den in Jermyn Street in 1934. He exploited a loophole which allowed credit or postal betting but not cash.

In 1938, he was the joint owner of Lone Keel who went on to win the 1938 English Greyhound Derby.

In 1944, he produced the first fixed-odds football coupon. In 1954, he reversed his business into Holder's Investment Trust, a shell company, thereby securing a listing on the London Stock Exchange.

Although he had called legal betting offices "a cancer on society", he opened his first in 1966, after his competitors had stolen a march on him.

He was also interested in breeding horses and in 1943 bought a stud at Whitsbury in Hampshire. Hill bred and owned Cantelo, a filly who won the St Leger Stakes in 1959. He retired in 1970 and died in Newmarket the following year, aged 68.

== Family ==
In 1923, he married Ivy Burley and together they had one daughter, Kathleen Hill. In 1961, he had a second daughter, Miranda Baker, with his partner Sheila Baker.
