= Wheatley Hill Stadium =

Greyhound racing stadium

- Location: Wheatley Hill, County Durham
- Coordinates: 54°44′55″N 1°24′57″W
- Opened: 1930s
- Closed: 2019 (currently closed due to fire)

Wheatley Hill Stadium is a greyhound racing stadium in Wheatley Hill, County Durham. It is situated to the west of Peterlee, near Thornley and Wingate.

It is currently closed following a serious fire but usually races on Friday evenings at 7.15pm, Facilities included a club, bar, and tote which were destroyed in the fire.

== Origins ==
The track was constructed for the mining community and is known to have been active in 1947. It is known to have hosted whippet racing as early as 1936 and likely to have raced some greyhound racing as well.

The stadium is situated on the north side Black Lane that runs off the Avenue.

== History ==
Norman Fannon bought the track in 1965 and spent a large sum of money improving the facilities. A custom made hare called the McFannon (made from hundreds of ex-Army bedsteads) was Fannon's favourite. The track was very tight, almost circular at the time.

During the 1970s, racing was held on Wednesday and Saturday evenings at 7.30pm over race distances of 270, 450, and 600 yards. There was an 'Inside Sumner' hare system and the track was all-grass. Facilities included a licensed club.

Fannon remained the owner and, by the late 1980s, the track had become sand and had a McGee hare system. Kennels for 50 greyhounds were on site with car parking for 200 vehicles. The facilities included a bar, covered stand, and refreshment room with racing on Wednesday and Friday evenings. Fannon died in 2006.

== Closure ==
The track was closed in November 2019 following a serious fire on Sunday 17 November and looks unlikely to re-open.
