= Townhead Greyhound Track =

- Location: Irvine, North Ayrshire, Scotland
- Coordinates: 55°36′43″N 4°39′44″W
- Opened: 1932
- Closed: 1967

Townhead Greyhound Track was a former greyhound racing track in Irvine, North Ayrshire, Scotland.

It was located on the north bank of the River Irvine between Broomlands Drive and Kirk Vennel and would have been situated where Bradbury Glebe is today. The track opened on 30 December 1932 eight months before the Irvine Caledonian Stadium. Handicap and level break racing took place on Thursday and Saturday evenings on a small 300 yards circumference circuit. Distances used were 280 and 460 yards behind a 'Ball' hare. Townhead hosted the racing for 35 years before closing in 1967.
