= Breck Park Stadium =

Former greyhound racing venue in Liverpool

- Location: Liverpool, England
- Coordinates: 53°25′47″N 2°56′33″W
- Opened: 1927
- Closed: 1948

Breck Park Stadium was a greyhound racing stadium in Liverpool, England.

== Origins ==
Breck Park would become the first of four greyhound stadiums in the city of Liverpool; the others were White City Greyhound Stadium, Stanley Greyhound Stadium and Seaforth Greyhound Stadium.

In 1927, the site chosen to construct Breck Park was on the south side of Townsend Road on unused ground and a former site of a brick works adjacent to a goods yard and the Edge Hill and Bootle branch railway line. To the north there was a football ground and housing and to the south was a Corporation yard.

The Liverpool Greyhound Club Ltd (LGC) was one of the first greyhound racing companies in existence and was a rival to the larger Greyhound Racing Association (GRA). A bitter battle took place during 1927 when the (LGC) and the Leeds Greyhound Association Ltd (LGA) owners of the Elland Road Greyhound Stadium took the GRA to court for false advertising. The public claim by the GRA was that they had sole rights of greyhounds chasing electric hares and this upset other companies because it implied that they were the only company allowed to race greyhounds.

== Opening ==
The first meeting at Breck Park got underway on 23 April 1927 and attracted 8,000 spectators. The GRA opened Stanley Greyhound Stadium on Prescot Road just four months later.

== History ==
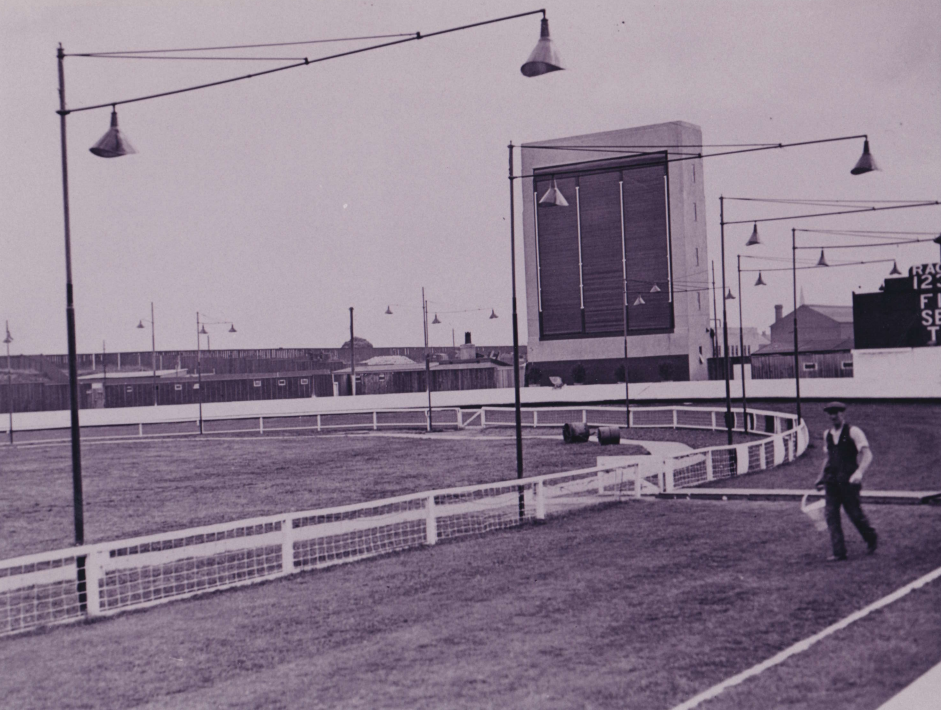
Breck Park Greyhound Stadium c.1940

The dangers of early racing were evident when during a meeting in September 1927 the electric hare ran off the rails and broke through the railings scattering spectators in the shilling ring. Affiliation to a governing body came in the form of the British Greyhound Tracks Control Society (BGTCS); this organisation was much smaller than the National Greyhound Racing Society (NGRS).

Despite stiff competition all four Liverpool tracks made good profits, based on the fact that there was a large population with many keen on the racing. In 1932 the track faced a one-week closure after the authorities took the track owners to court over the use of the totalisator. Also in 1932 Breck Park switched allegiance from the BGTCS to NGRS becoming the only Liverpool track with affiliation to the NGRS at the time.

Breck Park became a popular venue for boxing and held many high-profile bouts being promoted alongside the greyhound racing.

== Bomb damage ==
The track suffered bomb damage during the Second World War as many parts of Liverpool did at the time but contrary to some reports the closure of the track was not attributed to this damage because business was good after the war. In 1946 the totalisator turnover was £836,354 and one year later £624,157.

== Closure ==
The stadium suffered a serious fire on 26 February 1948, the same day that another unrelated serious fire ripped through White City, Manchester. Whereas the Manchester track recovered Breck Park did not; the wooden buildings had been destroyed resulting in the immediate suspension of racing at the track. The owners considered the rebuild cost unviable.

It is possible that racing either returned for a very short period of time after 1948 or that there were plans to restart the racing at some stage based on the fact that in March 1950 all four Liverpool tracks (including Breck Park) resigned from their NGRC affiliation. The stadium was demolished and renamed Edinburgh Park in 1953, the track would have been located where the Edinburgh Park Dockers Club and Waterloo Dock FC football pitches meet Darmonds Green Avenue.

== Track records ==
| Distance yards | Greyhound | Time | Date |
|---|---|---|---|
| 300 | Hilltalk | 17.57 | 1948 |
| 525 | Shannon Shore | 30.00 | November 1946 |
| 500 H | Bucail Macanta | 30.47 | 1948 |
| 525 H | Mutt's Ambition | 32.10 | 1948 |
