= Tamworth Greyhound Stadium =

Racing stadium in the UK

- Location: Watling/Lichfield Street, Fazeley near Tamworth, Staffordshire, England
- Coordinates: 52°36′53″N 1°42′36″W
- Opened: 1947
- Closed: 1963

Tamworth Greyhound Stadium was a greyhound racing and speedway stadium in Fazeley near Tamworth, Staffordshire, England.

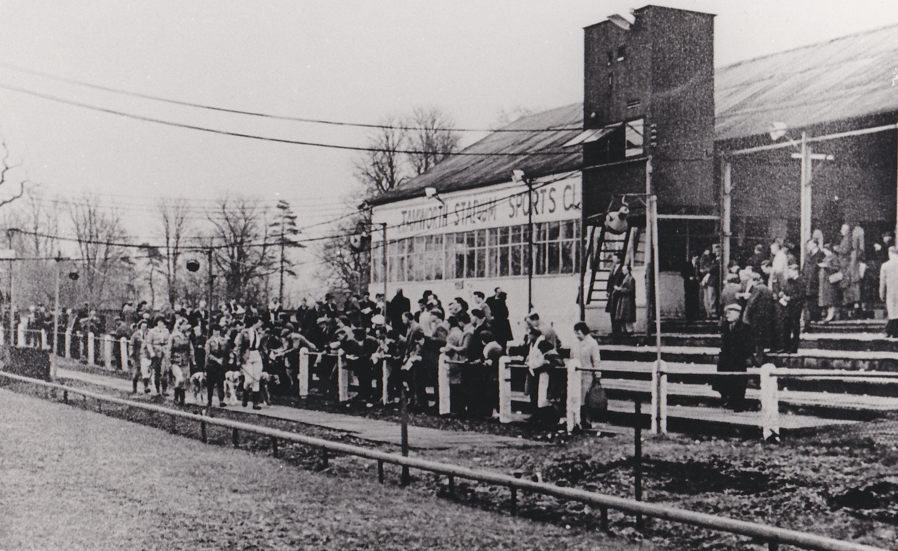
Tamworth Greyhound Stadium c.1950

== Origins ==
The Drayton Manor Estate on the west side of Fazeley had existed since the Norman conquest of England and survived until 1929 when the Drayton Manor house was demolished. The grounds covered a large expanse and included deer parks, the large deer park to the north of the estate and below Long Wood eventually had a cricket ground in a small section just above Bourne Brook.

The cricket ground came into existence after Sir Robert Peel laid out the first-class cricket facility including a pavilion and dance hall.

== Opening ==
After the Second World War in 1946 Captain Arthur Westwood began the construction of a greyhound track on the site of the cricket ground as much of the estate was sold off. Access to the stadium would be from Lichfield Street/Watling Street.

The greyhound racing started on 30 August 1947. The main area that had included the house and gardens was sold in 1949 and became leisure gardens which was the early form of the Drayton Manor Theme Park. The remaining parts of the estate were divided into farmland, a business park and a considerable amount of housing.

== History ==
Speedway (Tamworth Speedway) took place in 1947 and ran until 1950, with the speedway track inside the greyhound circuit and pits behind the main stand. Speedway ended after the 1950 season with the blame being given as a lack of support by promoter Les Marshall.

The greyhound circuit consisted of race distances over 268, 500 and 700 yards races and appointed race days in 1949 were Monday and Friday at 7.30pm. It was described as an average size course with a 432 yards circumference and an 'Outside Sumner' hare system.

Facing the Watling Street side (the back straight) was a covered stand and a Junior Club with refreshments and on the home straight was the main covered stand and Senior Club featuring a restaurant and snack bar. There was a maximum capacity of 2,500 and the racing kennels were situated on the first bend.

The resident kennels were nearby at Park Farm, just a twenty-minute walk from the track and this allowed the trainers to exercise the hounds throughout the whole of the estate. With each trainer having their own kennel range in a rural setting it resembled a smaller version of the Greyhound Racing Association's Hook estate in Northaw. The kennels would have been very close to where the Drayton Manor Zoo is today.

The stadium was affiliated to the National Greyhound Racing Club when it opened.

The stadium closed at the end of 1950 when the Tamworth and Greyhound Sports Stadium Co, went into voluntary liquidation. However it re-opened under the management of W A Brewer in 1952 and racing continued.

== Closure ==
In November 1960 an application was submitted for a housing scheme on the site. After the application was approved in July 1962 by the Lichfield Rural Council it was announced that the stadium was to close. The final race meeting was held in the first week of June 1963 just before the 17 acre re-development started for housing on Reindeer Road and Dama Road.

== Track records ==
Distance yards	Greyhound	Time	Date
268	Dancing Dinkie	15.70	22.11.1947
500	Penny Discount	28.68	25.10.1947

== See also ==
- Tamworth Speedway
