= Stanley Greyhound Stadium (Liverpool) =

Former greyhound racing venue in Liverpool

- Interactive map of Stanley Greyhound Stadium
- Location: Liverpool, England
- Coordinates: 53°24′46″N 2°55′35″W

Construction
- Opened: 1927
- Closed: 1961

Tenant
- Greyhound racing

Stanley Greyhound Stadium (Liverpool) was a greyhound racing track in east Liverpool, England. It is not to be confused with Stanley Greyhound Stadium in County Durham also known as Murray Park.

== Origins ==
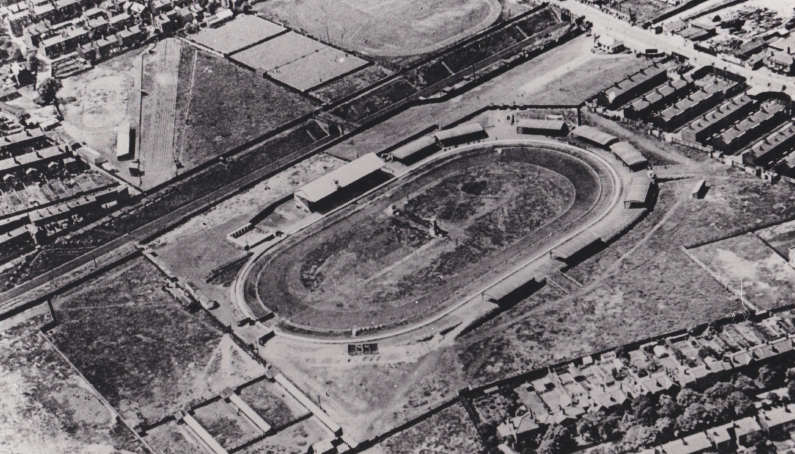
Stanley Greyhound Stadium in Liverpool c.1950

In 1927 a race developed between two companies to construct the first greyhound stadium in Liverpool. The race was won by the Liverpool Greyhound Club Ltd (LGC) when they opened Breck Park Stadium in April 1927. The other company the Greyhound Racing Association had chosen a site on a former brick works and clay pit for their track that would be known as the Stanley Greyhound Stadium and it opened just four months later. The Stanley track was south of Prescot Road and north of Edge Lane in the Old Swan area of Liverpool and ran parallel to the railway line.

== Opening ==
The opening night was on 17 August 1927 and the GRA wasted no time in upsetting their rival track by posting national advertisements warning potential stadium investors. Their claims were that they had sole rights of greyhounds chasing electric hares and this upset the Breck Park and Elland Road Greyhound Stadium management so much that they took the GRA to court over the notices.

The circumference of the track was a large 516 yards and it provided a stern stamina test for a greyhound. There were 160 resident kennels on site that served both Stanley and later sister track Seaforth Greyhound Stadium.

== Pre War history ==
One of the first significant events taking place was the Westmorland Cup; this was a competition for hurdlers from the Stanley track with the winner taking part in Northern Zone final. The first two in turn would then participate in the Champion Hurdle (or the Grand National as it is known today) at White City in London against the Southern zone qualifiers.

The first season of racing ended in October 1927 and the track went into the winter break with plans to reopen during Easter 1928. However, during the break the GRA sold the stadium to the Electric Hare Company. The directors were Jimmy Shand, Tom Wilson and John Bilsland and they moved their entire greyhound operation from the Southend Kursaal in Southend-on-Sea (greyhounds included) by train to take over Stanley after leaving Southend due to high rent demands.

Speedway in Liverpool began in the summer of 1928, when a track was constructed inside the greyhound track. The sport which had recently been introduced to the United Kingdom from Australia, attracted an audience to the first practice on 21 August 1928, with a full race meeting held a few days later on 25 August.

The Stanley track boomed resulting in the syndicate taking control of another track in Liverpool called Seaforth which they planned to open in the near future. Wilson opted out of the company and his shares were purchased by the other two. Affiliation to a governing body came in the form of the British Greyhound Tracks Control Society (BGTCS); this organisation was much smaller than the National Greyhound Racing Society (NGRS).

By 1930 Bilsland bought out Shand for £400,000 leaving the Electric Hare Company under the control of Bilsland. With the money gained from the buyout Shand had plans of a grand nature, a super track just one mile from Stanley and it would be called White City Stadium (Liverpool) and it was opened in 1932. Seaforth Stadium became the fourth Liverpool greyhound stadium when it was opened by Bilsland on 25 February 1933.

The decision to open Seaforth by the Electric Hare Company Ltd would be an extremely successful one because despite its location away from the centre it would become the most frequented. Despite the fierce competition all four tracks actually made good profits, probably based on the fact that there was a very keen population willing to spend money on the racing. Stanley suffered legal problems just like Breck Park due to the totalisator and gambling issues that ended up in court.

The Liverpool Stanley rugby league club arrived in 1934 and the venue was also used a second time for speedway as the Liverpool Merseysiders rode there from 1936 to 1937. The war arrived and severely disrupted racing during the duration.

The Stanley Greyhound Track also hosted a World featherweight Title fight between Liverpool boxer Nel Tarleton when he challenged Freddie Miller for the NBA and The Ring world title on 12th June 1935.

== Post War history ==
Subject to a boom like so many others tracks after the war the totalisator turnover in 1946 was a remarkable £1,814,431.

Speedway returned for a third spell at Stanley in 1949 as the Liverpool Chads, promoted by James Baxter, agreed a deal with the Electric Hare Greyhound Racing Ltd, the stadium owners. The Liverpool Stanley rugby league team left the stadium in 1950 moving to Knotty Ash. By March 1950 the decision was made by the four Liverpool tracks and Firhill in Glasgow to resign from their NGRC affiliation. The chairman of Seaforth & Firhill John Bilsland stated that the cost of NGRC membership exceeds £1,000 per year if you included the greyhound registration fees.

== Closure ==
Speedway finished again at Stanley in 1953 before having two final seasons in 1957 and 1960. In June 1961 planning was submitted for the site to be redeveloped for residential and ancillary purposes but although this was initially refused it was clear that the stadium was going to be lost and it finally closed on 11 November 1961.

The site became a huge wholesale fish, fruit and vegetable market in 1964, and subsequently a police station in 2020.

== Track records ==
Distance yards	Greyhound	Time	Date
340	Husky Words	18.91	26 June 1943
500	Trejack	28.19	23 September 1944
525	Rindifin D	29.29	3 October 1948
