= Thurnscoe Greyhound Racing Track =

Greyhound racing track

- Location: Chapel Lane, Thurnscoe East, borough of Barnsley, South Yorkshire
- Coordinates: 53°32′46″N 1°17′38″W
- Opened: unknown
- Closed: unknown

Thurnscoe Greyhound Racing Track was a football and a greyhound racing and whippet track located in Thurnscoe East, part of the metropolitan borough of Barnsley in South Yorkshire.

== Origins ==
The football ground was constructed believed to be sometime during the 1920s and by the outbreak of the World War II was being used for whippet racing and greyhound racing.

== Greyhound racing ==
When the racing started the track was known as Fairplay Racing Track. The racing was independent (not affiliated to the sports governing body the National Greyhound Racing Club). The first meeting was held during April 1936 with the first promoter being master butcher Benjamin Lovatt of Highgate Villas.

The track was 336 yards in circumference and could accommodate 4,000 patrons and was known locally as the Spike Greyhound Stadium.

== Closure ==
The racing ended sometime around 1950. The venue was later known as the Thurnscoe Sporting Club.
