= County Ground Stadium =

Rugby union, greyhound racing and speedway stadium

- Interactive map of County Ground Stadium
- Location: Exeter, Devon
- Coordinates: 50°42′52″N 3°32′30″W
- Capacity: 5,750 (750 seats)

Construction
- Opened: 1929
- Closed: 2006

The County Ground Stadium, also previously known as the Devon County Athletic Ground, was a rugby union, greyhound racing and speedway stadium in Exeter, Devon.

It was one of two separate venues in Exeter known as the County Ground, along with the still-used County Cricket Ground. It is also not to be confused with the Exeter Greyhound Stadium in Marsh Barton that also held greyhound racing and speedway.

== Origins ==
The first sporting use of the site was the 19th century, where the land behind the church in St Thomas, just off Cowick Street, was used for cricket, football, wrestling, and other sports. By July 1841, over an acre of land had been developed to form a wrestling ring, with temporary raised covered seating. Wrestling was popular between hay and corn harvests, with prize money of 100 sovereigns.

In 1888, the field was put up for sale, and in 1893 it was purchased by the newly formed Devon County Athletic Company Ltd, led by former mayor Robert Pople. The company build the first permanent grandstand with a capacity of 700. As well as the field, the ground had an elliptical cycling track around the edge.

The company funded work on the ground by issuing of £6,000 of share capital in £1 share lots.

The ground was used by users including:

- Exeter Cathedral School
- Exeter Football Club (which was a rugby club)
- Civil service cricket club
- Exe Vale Cricket Club
- an annual horse show

== Early 20th century ==
In 1901, for the coronation of Edward VII, the ground hosted a sports day for the public, including egg and spoon race, sack race, and greasy pole, a military tournament the following day, and the Exeter Horse Show.

In September 1905, the County Ground staged the opening match of the New Zealand rugby team's first-ever British tour, against the Devon County XV. New Zealand's "All Blacks" nickname was first coined in media reports of their shock 55–4 victory over Devon.

By November 1905, the Devon County Athletic Group company reported that the stadium was in dire financial trouble, and faced closure within 6 months, but by 1907, they reported a healthy profit.

In 1911, the ground was once again the focus of coronation celebrations for George V, including a display by over one thousand schoolchildren, and a grand firework display in the evening.

The ground closed for World War I, and in 1918 burned down, delaying reopening until 1921 with the construction of a new grandstand.

In January 1929, Southern Speedways Ltd, led by Mr Seward Glanfield agreed a ten-year contract with the Devon Athletic Ground Company and the cycle track was ripped up, and replaced with a motorcycle speedway track. The original company went into liquidation in 1930 after a year, but the track was taken on by a second promoter, but speedway stopped after only 2 years, closing in 1931 when the second promoting company went into liquidation.

On Saturday 13 December 1930, promoters started independent (unaffiliated to a governing body) greyhound racing, with the 370 yards (340 m) track holding races over 250, 440, 620 and 810 metres. The track was described as a tight circuit with an almost square shaped track. Main competitions included the Spring Cup, Derby and St Leger and they had an 'Inside Sumner' hare system.

== From World War II ==
The ground again closed for the Second World War, being used as a military transport hub, but reopened afterwards.

In 1947, the Exeter Falcons speedway team returned the sport to the ground, where they continued until 2005. The restart of speedway at the County Ground including the first speedway in the country to feature a steel safety fence.

The ground also continued to host the Exeter Chiefs rugby union team as the primary tenant.

== Closure ==
It was the home ground of Exeter Rugby Club (latterly Exeter Chiefs) prior to their move to Sandy Park in 2006. Bellway Homes built 150 houses on the site shortly afterwards.
