= Staines Greyhound Stadium =

Dog racing stadium in England, 1928–1960

- Interactive map of Staines Greyhound Stadium
- Location: Staines, Surrey
- Coordinates: 51°26′22″N 0°31′56″W

Construction
- Opened: 1928
- Closed: 1960

Staines Greyhound Stadium was a greyhound racing stadium in Staines-upon-Thames.

== Origins and opening ==
Staines Greyhound track opened on 21 January 1928, and the first race was won by a greyhound called Oojah over 525 yards. The stadium was at Hythe End just north of the River Thames, south of Wraysbury Road. Previously this area was an unpopulated rural area that today makes up some of the Colne Valley Parks. The track was very basic with one main stand on the home straight. During its early existence it was sometimes referred to as Bell Weir Park.

== Affiliation ==
For most of its history, the stadium operated as an independent ("flapping") track, unaffiliated with the National Greyhound Racing Club (NGRC).

== Cheetah racing ==
In 1936 Arthur Leggett, the owner of Romford Greyhound Stadium, decided to bring cheetah racing to the UK. Twelve cheetahs arrived from Kenya in December 1936, courtesy of explorer Kenneth Gandar-Dower. After six months of quarantine, the cheetahs were given time to acclimatise before Romford, Harringay Stadium and Staines were earmarked for the experiment with the cheetahs, running for the first time on Saturday 11 December 1937 at Romford.

The experiment failed and the racing was stopped because although the cheetahs were able to better the greyhound times, they had to be let off first when racing greyhounds, and when they raced against each other they became uninterested and stopped chasing the lure.

== History ==
In 1938, a Putt Mossman Motorcycle rodeo took place (this was a form of motorcycle tricks and skills). Stock car racing was also popular in the late 1950s.

Staines owner Jack Walsh was in partnership with fellow bookmaker William Hill and they won the English Greyhound Derby with Lone Keel in 1938.

The track could hold a maximum of 5,000 spectators and supplied a tote with a turnover in 1947 of £47,165.

In 1949, Jack Walsh expressed his frustration with the authorities after his application to join the National Greyhound Racing Society was withheld. After agreeing to the completion and upgrading of facilities he was upset that the application also meant he would have to race on selected days as chosen by the NGRC as to avoid competition with Slough Stadium which was against his given rights as a track promoter as stated in the Betting and Lotteries Act 1934, an action that he could not agree with.

== Closure ==
The stadium closed in 1960 and was dismantled in 1965. It later appeared as a filming location in the 1964 film Séance on a Wet Afternoon.
