= Hinckley Greyhound Stadium =

Greyhound racing venue in Hinckley, England

- Location: Nutts Lane, Hinckley, southwest Leicestershire
- Coordinates: 52°31′54″N 1°23′59″W
- Opened: 1936
- Closed: 2006

Hinckley Greyhound Stadium was a greyhound racing stadium on Nutts Lane in Hinckley, south-west Leicestershire.

== Origins ==
A man called Joe Grant started the Hinckley Greyhound and Whippet Racing Association in 1936 and a track was constructed in Nutts Lane directly on the north side of the London, Midland and Scottish Railway South Leicestershire branch.

== Opening ==
The track opened in 1936 and the racing was independent (not affiliated to the sports governing body the National Greyhound Racing Club).

== History ==
During the 1930s and 1940s the stadium ran mixed meetings where the greyhound races were supplemented by whippet racing. Joe Grant purchased an extra one and a half acres in 1947 and the track was extended. A McWhiter hare system was installed and the track established itself as one of the leading flapping tracks in the country. Flapping was the nickname given to independent tracks.

By 1960s the McWhirter hare system was replaced by the 'Inside Sumner' on a track measuring a 400-yard circumference with race distances over 300, 500, 710 and 900 yards. Racing was held on Wednesday and Saturday evening at 7.30pm.

In 1972 Tom Grant took over from Joe after his death in 1972. During the 1980s and 1990s the track had a covered stand, car parking for 200 vehicles and a computerised totalisator. The stadium also held a Sunday market.

== Closure ==
The council granted Crest Nicholson planning permission in 2006 for 84 homes. The stadium was demolished making way for housing called Greyhound Croft.
