= Luton Stadium =

Sports venue in the UK

- Location: Skimpot Road, Skimpot, Luton
- Coordinates: 51°53′27″N 0°28′52″W
- Opened: 1931
- Closed: 1973

Luton Stadium was a former greyhound racing and speedway stadium.

== Origins ==
A proposal to construct a stadium in Luton in 1927 on a seven-acre site on Beechwood Road in nearby Leagrave had failed to get planning permission after drawing objections from several fronts but mainly the clergy. One year later a second attempt was made with the suggested site being open land on Icknield Road. The proposal by the Luton and Dunstable Greyhound Racing Club was refused planning permission on appeal by the district council in April 1928.

The Luton and Dunstable Greyhound Racing Club finally gained permission and constructed a stadium in 1931 on the south side of the Dunstable Road and east side of Skimpot Road in Skimpot, Luton.

== Opening ==
The stadium offered a simple covered grandstand on the home straight with very few other facilities when racing got underway in 1931.

== Speedway ==
A 311-yard speedway track inside the dog track hosted the Luton Hatters from 1934 but due to financial problems only lasted three years.

== History ==
After the war in 1946 the totalisator turnover was £308,810 and the stadium was run by Luton Stadium Ltd in 1953. The racing was independent (unaffiliated to a governing body).

By the mid-1960s racing was held on Tuesday and Saturday nights with trial days every other Thursday afternoon. The track had a circumference of 405 yards and race distances of 410, 470 and 675 yards with an 'Inside Sumner' hare. Fourteen bookmakers were in attendance and the principal races were the Bedfordshire Derby and the Bedfordshire St Leger.

== Closure ==
Racing continued until November 1973 when the stadium was closed. The exact circumstances of closure were confusing because the track had been purchased by the Totalisators and Greyhound Holdings (T.G.H) who owned some prominent tracks including Crayford & Bexleyheath, Leeds, Brough Park, Gosforth, Willenhall and Monmore and around the same time a deal was on the table for a Ladbrokes takeover of TGH. When the Ladbrokes takeover was complete the track did not figure in the company plans and it was sold and demolished for industrial units. They then built a new car park for their Caesars Palace Casino on part of the site which today is the site of a Mecca Bingo, casino and fitness centre and the car parks for all three.
