= Seaforth Greyhound Stadium =

Former greyhound racing venue in Liverpool

- Location: Liverpool, England
- Coordinates: 53°27′44″N 3°00′46″W
- Opened: 1933
- Closed: 1965

Seaforth Greyhound Stadium was a greyhound racing stadium in Liverpool, England.

== Origins ==
In 1927 the Seaforth area was heavily populated with industry and housing with very few available plots of land that could provide enough space for a new stadium. The plot selected was east of Liverpool docks and Crosby Road south and on the south side of Church Road. Three stands were constructed, two adjoining ones adjacent to Church Road and one on the opposite side of the course facing Crosby Road South and Henley Street (no longer in existence). The racing kennels were on the corner of Church Road and Caradoc Road but there was no room for resident kennels which would find a home on the Portland House grounds between the Old Seafield Convent and the impressive Seaforth Hall.

Jimmy Shand and John Bilsland the owners of the Electric Hare Company had already built Stanley Stadium in 1927, the same year as Breck Park Stadium and Bilsland planned to open Seaforth (a third track in Liverpool) after buying out Shand for £400,000 in 1930. Shand duly planned to open his own track in Liverpool called White City which won the race between the pair to open first after delays to the construction at Seaforth.

== Opening ==
Seaforth became the fourth greyhound stadium in Liverpool when opening on 25 February 1933 and despite its location away from the centre of the city it would become the most frequented in this industrial area by the docks.

== History ==
The stadium hosted Speedway for a short period of time from 1934-1935 but it never gained a foothold. In 1946 after the Second World War the totalisator turnover was a significant £1,990,410.

By March 1950 the decision was made by the four Liverpool tracks and Firhill to resign from their National Greyhound Racing Society affiliation due to increased costs. John Bilsland stated that the cost of NGRC membership exceeds £1,000 per year if you included the greyhound registration fees.

== Closure ==
On 31 December 1965 Seaforth closed becoming the third of the four Liverpool tracks to close. Today the area is housing called Church Grove found East of Liverpool docks and 'Crosby Road South' and south of 'Church Road'.

== Track records ==
Distance yards	Greyhound	Time	Date
500	Buckram	28.66	14 June 1943
