= Worksop Greyhound Stadium =

Sports venue in the UK

- Location: Worksop, Nottinghamshire
- Coordinates: 53°19′06″N 1°08′07″W
- Opened: 1939
- Closed: 1969

Worksop Greyhound Stadium was a greyhound racing stadium situated off Claylands Avenue, in Worksop, Nottinghamshire.

== Origins ==
The Worksop Cricket & Sports Club turned down an application for a greyhound track at the Central Avenue Ground in 1937 before a track was constructed in 1939, on fields to the west side of the Gateford Hotel, off Claylands Avenue.

== Opening ==
Greyhound racing was started by the Worskop Sports Stadium Ltd (formed in 1938) and began on Monday 24 April 1939.

== History ==
The racing was independent (not affiliated to the National Greyhound Racing Club) and initially took place every Monday and Friday at 5.30pm over distances of 425 and 500 yards, soon replaced by 325 yards. There was a clubroom, a totalisator and a popular enclosure stand. The racing was interrupted by the war and the stadium closed before reopening on 24 February 1940.

=== Tote returns ===
Tote Returns
Year	£
1939	9,398
1941	7,990
1942	8,257

Tote Returns
Year	£
1943	10,030
1944	10,953
1945	8,257

Tote Returns
Year	£
1946	30,326
1947	25,968
1948	24,785

== Closure ==
The stadium closed on 18 April 1969.
