= White City Stadium (Liverpool) =

Former greyhound racing venue in Liverpool

- Location: Liverpool, England
- Coordinates: 53°25′26″N 2°56′40″W
- Opened: 1932
- Closed: 1973

White City Stadium (Liverpool) was a greyhound racing stadium in Liverpool, England.

== Origins ==
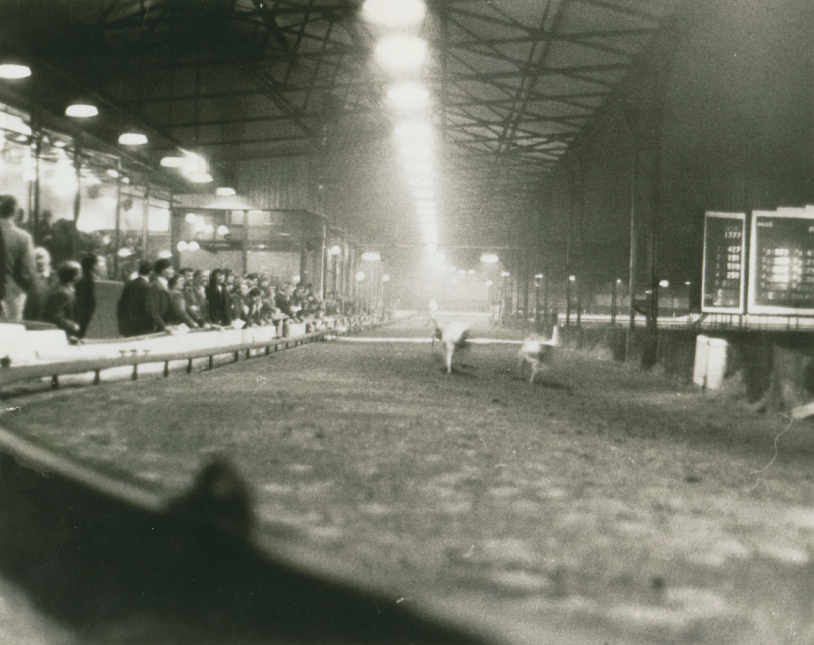
White City Stadium in Liverpool c.1960

Jimmy Shand and John Bilsland the owners of the Electric Hare Company had already built Stanley Greyhound Stadium in 1927, the same year as Breck Park Stadium and Bilsland planned to open Seaforth Greyhound Stadium after buying out Shand for £400,000 in 1930. However Shand also planned to open his own new track in Liverpool called White City, which won the race to be the third track in Liverpool to open after delays to the construction at Seaforth.

Shand's plans were of a grand nature, a super track just one mile from the Stanley stadium located on the Lower Breck Road on an existing athletic ground. It was situated between housing and the Belmont Road Institution (a workhouse that would later become a hospital).

== Opening ==
The stadium opened on Saturday 20 August 1932 and initially traded as The White City Greyhound Racing Company (Liverpool). The directors were Mrs & Mrs Shand, R.A.Russell, Bee Edwards and Robert Wright with Shand, Russell and Wright acting as stewards with the latter also holding the post of Racing Director. The stadium was completely under cover and cost £70,000 to construct.

== History ==
The stadium was up for sale in November 1932 for the sum of £150,000. It is believed that the sale eventually took place several years later sometime around 1936 when Shand sold it to the Anfield Greyhound and Sports Club Limited. The circuit was described as a fair-size course with the surface thatched all year round for insulation. There was an 'Outside Sumner' hare system and facilities included a large Members Club situated in the best enclosure. All of the greyhounds were company owned. Profits after the Second World War were significant with Totalisator turnover of £1,726,194 in 1946 followed by £957,067 in 1947.

The stadium was originally affiliated to the British Greyhound Tracks Control Society (BGTCS) but switched to the larger National Greyhound Racing Club (NGRC). By March 1950 the decision was made by the four Liverpool tracks and Firhill to resign from their NGRC affiliation due to increased costs. John Bilsland owner of the rival Stanley track stated that the cost of NGRC membership exceeds £1,000 per year if you included the greyhound registration fees.

White City remained the sole track in Liverpool following the closures of the other three in 1948, 1961 & 1965 respectively. Racing was held on Friday and Saturday nights at 7.30pm. The track was a 440-yard circumference circuit and the running surface was hay on peat moss. Facilities included two buffet bars and two licensed bars. In 1972 the track was purchased by the Greyhound Racing Association which brought concerns because the company were actively buying and selling stadiums for development purposes during this period.

== Closure ==
The GRA sold the track for development on 6 October 1973 with only 700 people turning up to witness greyhound racing end in Liverpool. Edward Baines the manager organised the movement of eighty company greyhounds to other tracks and all of the equipment was sold as the site was redeveloped.

Today St Margarets Primary School is situated where the track existed off the Lower Breck Road on the south side between Belmont Grove and Hampson Street. The actual stadium would have sat largely on the school field.

In 2000 the GRA's plans to build a new stadium in the northern suburb of Fazakerley failed.

== Track records ==
Distance yards	Greyhound	Time	Date
500	Swift Wonder	28.57	18 September 1964
500	Moose Jet	28.52	1970
525	Jeannie Johno	30.32	1947
525	Keep Quacking	30.22	21 July 1948
525 H	Red Nuxer	31.00	March 1946
