= Temple Mills Stadium =

Early-20th-century English venue for dog racing and boxing

- Interactive map of Temple Mills Stadium
- Location: Temple Mills Lane, East London
- Coordinates: 51°33′01″N 0°00′37″W

Construction
- Opened: 1933
- Closed: 1949

Temple Mills Stadium also known as White Temple Stadium was a greyhound racing, whippet racing and boxing venue in East London.

== Origins ==
The track was located on the west side of Temple Mills Lane and accessed by a road called Wycliffe Road at the time. To the west was the River Lea and it was dominated to the east, north and south by the Temple Mills Great Eastern Railway. It was constructed on ground next to an Artificial Manure Works and resulted in the considerable reduction of Wycliffe Road.

== Opening ==
The track is known to have been in operation in January 1933, when it was hosting whippet racing over 315 and 480 yards. It is not to be confused with Hackney Wick Stadium or Clapton Stadium.

== History ==
The track was described as a very basic flapping track (independent, not affiliated to the National Greyhound Racing Club). It held significant boxing bouts during 1935 including ones by Dick Corbett and Harry Mizler. The 1946 tote turnover reached £776,050, a sizeable sum bearing in mind the track only housed a maximum of 650 people.

During 1946 the National Greyhound Racing Club visited the track (during the £1,000 Cambridgeshire final event) with the intention of catching attendees with an NGRC licence in their name. If they identify anyone they will subsequently disqualify them from all NGRC tracks. The attending of flapping tracks by any person with a licence is prohibited in the rules of racing.

On 11 February 1947 the track held a daylight race meeting despite a government ban announced by Sir Guy Bower (the Deputy Secretary). The ban was designed to conserve fuel and the meeting was attended by government officials to verify that no electricity was used. The hare was powered by two men on a tandem.

== Closure ==
It is believed that it closed around 1949. It became a playing field on the north side of the newly constructed Clays Lane. before being converted into a council-run site for Travellers. Initially cleared for the 2012 Summer Olympics, it is today the Chobham Manor housing, on the south side of Abercrombie Road, close to the Lee Valley VeloPark.
