= Stanley Greyhound Stadium =

Stadium

Stanley Greyhound Stadium Murray Park Stadium
- Interactive map of Stanley Greyhound Stadium; Murray Park Stadium
- Location: Chester Road/High Street, Stanley, County Durham
- Coordinates: 54°52′24″N 1°41′25″W

Construction
- Opened: 1937
- Closed: 1994

Stanley Greyhound Stadium, also known as Murray Park Stadium, was a greyhound racing stadium in Stanley, County Durham.

== Origins ==
In the northerly part of County Durham stands the former colliery town of Stanley and the Murray Park Stadium was built on the site of a football pitch on the east side of Ridley Street, Church Street and Joicey Square. The track would later be known as Stanley Greyhound Stadium and could be accessed from its south side off the Chester Road or High Street.

The track ran as an independent (unaffiliated to a governing body) at this stage and had no connection with either the British Greyhound Tracks Control Society (BGTCS) or the larger rival National Greyhound Racing Club (NGRCS).

== Origins and opening ==
Greyhound racing started on Thursday 26 August 1937 when five thousand people witnessed the first ever meeting with the first past the post being a greyhound called Beatrice May who stopped the clock at 18.30secs for 305 yards. It was described as having a small circumference of 367 yards resulting in race distances of 275, 450 and 635 yards of which most were handicap races.

== History ==
The totalisator turnover was significant for an independent track and towards the end of the war only Ashington in the county returned better figures than the 1947 figure of £750,765 posted by Stanley.

The promotion of Arthur Seymour and his wife Lily resulted in the track racing under NGRC rules towards the end of the decade, in the 1949 listings the track raced every Monday and Saturday at 7.00pm. The NGRC affiliation only lasted five years because during 1954 the decision was made to revert to independent status due to the fact that the NGRC refused to allow Stanley to race under a C-Licence. This type of licence was available to trainers who owned and trained a small kennel and if the tracks operated under what was termed the 'combine' they could allow C-Licence trainers race nights. Only Gateshead and South Shields remained in the combine following the withdrawal of Stanley.

On Saturday 2 October 1954 the track re-opened to independent racing with the press reporting a packed house and it remained as a 'flapper' (nickname for unaffiliated tracks) afterwards. Throughout the 1960s racing took place on Thursday and Saturday nights at 7.15pm over distances of 277, 460 and 637 yards behind an 'Inside Sumner' hare system. The main races hosted at the track were the Sprint Classic, Stanley Derby and Stanley St Leger.

== Closure ==
Stanley survived until 29 October 1994 when sold for housing.
