= Portland Park (Ashington) =

Football ground in Ashington, England

- Interactive map of Portland Park
- Location: Ashington, England
- Coordinates: 55.1846°N 1.5717°W
- Surface: Grass
- Record attendance: 13,199

Construction
- Opened: 1909
- Closed: 2008

Tenants
- Ashington A.F.C. Ashington Arrows; Greyhound racing (1936–1993)

Portland Park was a football ground in Ashington, England. It was the home ground of Ashington A.F.C. between 1909 and 2008. It also hosted greyhound racing from 1936 until 1993.

== History ==
The ground was opened in 1909 and was initially known as the Station Road Ground until 1912, when it was renamed Portland Park after the site's landowner the Duke of Portland. Ashington had previously played at Station Road, but sought a new ground after the Co-op decided to double their rent. Ashington were elected to the Third Division North of the Football League in 1921, by which time the ground had a 1,000-seat grandstand had been built on the northern touchline. After their election to the League the stand was renovated, and the three other sides of the ground had concrete terracing installed. The money for the works was raised by issuing 2,000 shares, which brought in £6,000, and the capacity was raised to 20,000.

The first Football League match played at the ground was on 27 August 1921, with Ashington beating Grimsby Town 1–0. The attendance of 9,000 was the highest Football League attendance recorded at Portland Park. Ashington were voted out of the Football League at the end of the 1928–29 season, with the last Football League match at Portland Park being a 3–0 defeat to Halifax Town. The attendance of just 706 was Ashington's lowest during their time in the League.

The ground's record attendance of 13,199 was set for an FA Cup second round match against Rochdale on 9 December 1950, with Ashington losing 2–1. The ground was no longer used for greyhound racing after 1964, but was subsequently used for speedway and stock car racing, becoming the home track of the Ashington Arrows speedway team. However only two speedway meetings were ever staged in 1972 with Phil Crump winning the Northumberland Open before the team was forced to leave after sparks led to a stand burning down.

== Greyhound racing ==
Racing was held from 3 October 1936 through to 1964 when the track closed. The track re-opened on 16 August 1984, with a circumference of 380 yards. Featuring sharp bends, race distances were 270, 480, and 660 yards. Racing ended during March 1993.

== Closure ==
In 2005 it was announced that the site had been sold for a retail development. Ashington remained at Portland Park until 2008, when they moved to Woodhorn Lane. The last game at the ground was played on 15 February 2008, with Ashington losing 3–2 to Seaham Red Star in front of 1,954 spectators. Ashington's final goal at the old ground was scored by centre forward Gareth Bainbridge. The site was used to build an Asda supermarket.
