= 2026 in UK and Ireland greyhound racing =

2026 in UK and Ireland greyhound racing is the 101st year of greyhound racing in the United Kingdom and also marked the centenary of greyhound racing in the United Kingdom. It is also the 100th year of greyhound racing in Ireland.

== Summary ==
The Greyhound Board of Great Britain (GBGB) announced its Category One and Two schedules for 2026 on 5 December 2025, with eleven races worth £20,000 or more to the winner. Greyhound Racing Ireland (GRI) released its Classics and Features calendar towards the end of 2025, with eleven races worth over €20,000 or more to the winner.

At the annual British greyhound of the year awards Proper Heiress won the 2025 greyhound of the year for champion trainer Mark Wallis. Mongys Wild also trained by Wallis won two awards (stayer and marathon performer of the year) and subsequently won the first £20,000 Category One race of the year after winning the Golden Jacket. Mongys Wild (a white and fawn dog) had already won the former classic event the ARC Cesarewitch in January at Central Park.

Amendments to the Rules of Racing introduced by the Greyhound Board of Great Britain (GBGB) came into effect in Great Britain on 1 January 2026, including new requirements on licensing information, greyhound retirement and injury policies at racecourses, and the publication of withdrawal reasons.

On 26 January 2026, Greyhound Racing Ireland (GRI) told the Irish Government in a pre-budget submission that rising welfare, veterinary and rehoming costs were placing increasing financial pressure on trainers and owners despite a recovery in attendance and commercial income. It said higher feed, transport and veterinary expenses were threatening the commercial viability of some participants and suggested that the Department of Agriculture could provide support through direct funding or VAT reductions. It also said that rehoming retired racing greyhounds had become increasingly difficult, with the number of dogs rehomed falling from 2,234 in 2021 to 1,100 in 2024.

On 28 January 2026, amendments to the Prohibition of Greyhound Racing (Wales) Bill were considered during Stage 2 proceedings in the Senedd. The bill, which would make it an offence to operate a greyhound racing stadium or organise greyhound racing in Wales, had previously been approved in principle by the Senedd in December 2025 and is now at Stage 3 of the legislative process, where MSs may table further amendments for debate and voting in plenary. Stage 3 proceedings were scheduled to be debated in the Senedd on 10 March 2026.

On 29 January 2026, the Scottish Parliament voted 69–27 at Stage 1 in favour of the Greyhound Racing (Offences) (Scotland) Bill, introduced by MSP Mark Ruskell, which proposes banning greyhound racing in Scotland. During the debate, Minister for Agriculture Jim Fairlie said the bill would prevent racing from resuming at the Thornton track and that the Scottish Government supported the legislation because racing greyhounds on oval tracks involved inherent welfare risks that could not be eliminated through licensing or good practice. The GBGB opposed the bill and criticised the proposal following the vote.

On 5 February 2026, the Oireachtas Committee of Public Accounts was told that €19 million from the Horse and Greyhound Racing Fund had been issued to GRI in 2024.

On 18 February 2026, the Greyhound Racing (Offences) (Scotland) Bill completed Stage 2 scrutiny in the Rural Affairs and Islands Committee, where amendments were considered before the bill proceeded to Stage 3. No amendments were lodged at Stage 3 and the final debate and vote on whether to pass the bill were scheduled for 12 March 2026 in the Scottish Parliament.

== Major honours ==
Major Winners
Award	Name of Winner
2026 English Greyhound Derby	
2026 Irish Greyhound Derby	
GBGB Greyhound Trainer of the Year	
GBGB Greyhound of the Year	
GRI Greyhound of the Year	

=== Principal British finals ===
Time Greyhound Nutrition TV Trophy, tbc
Pos	Name of Greyhound	Trap	SP	Time (sec)	Trainer
1st					
2nd					
3rd					
4th					
5th					
6th					

PGR Trainers' Judgement Night, tbc (March)
Pos	Trainer	Track	Pts
1st			
2nd			
3rd			
4th			
5th			
6th			

Arena Racing Company Laurels, Dunstall Park (11 Apr, 480m, £12,500)
Pos	Name of Greyhound	Trap	SP	Time	Trainer
1st					
2nd					
3rd					
4th					
5th					
6th					

Premier Greyhound Racing Regency, Brighton (1 Aug 695m, £20,000)
Pos	Name of Greyhound	Trap	SP	Time	Trainer
1st					
2nd					
3rd					
4th					
5th					
6th					

Premier Greyhound Racing St Leger, Dunstall Park (19 Sep, 715m, £20,000)
Pos	Name of Greyhound	Trap	SP	Time	Trainer
1st					
2nd					
3rd					
4th					
5th					
6th					

Premier Greyhound Racing Oaks, Dunstall Park (24 Oct, 480m, £20,000)
Pos	Name of Greyhound	Trap	SP	Time	Trainer
1st					
2nd					
3rd					
4th					
5th					
6th					

=== Principal Irish finals ===
Bresbet Easter Cup, Shelbourne 4 Apr, 550y, €25,000)
Pos	Name of Greyhound	Trap	SP	Time (sec)	Trainer
1st					
2nd					
3rd					
4th					
5th					
6th					

Con and Annie Kirby Memorial, Limerick (18 Apr, 525y, €80,000)
Pos	Name of Greyhound	Trap	SP	Time	Trainer
1st					
2nd					
3rd					
4th					
5th					
6th					

National Produce Stakes, Clonmel (24 May, 525y, €20,000)
Pos	Name of Greyhound	Trap	SP	Time	Trainer
1st					
2nd					
3rd					
4th					
5th					
6th					

Sporting Press Oaks, Shelbourne Park (13 Jun, 525y, €25,000)
Pos	Name of Greyhound	Trap	SP	Time	Trainer
1st					
2nd					
3rd					
4th					
5th					
6th					

Boylesports Champion Stakes, Shelbourne Park (4 Jul, 550y, €20,000)
Pos	Name of Greyhound	Trap	SP	Time	Trainer
1st					
2nd					
3rd					
4th					
5th					
6th					

Time Dundalk International, Dundalk (12 Jul, 550y, €20,000)
Pos	Name of Greyhound	Trap	SP	Time	Trainer
1st					
2nd					
3rd					
4th					
5th					
6th					

Time Puppy Derby, Shelbourne Park (25 Jul, 525y, €25,000)
Pos	Name of Greyhound	Trap	SP	Time	Trainer
1st					
2nd					
3rd					
4th					
5th					
6th					

Bar One Racing Irish Sprint Cup, Dundalk (14 Aug, 400y, €20,000)
Pos	Name of Greyhound	Trap	SP	Time	Trainer
1st					
2nd					
3rd					
4th					
5th					
6th					

BarOne Racing Irish Laurels, Cork (17 Oct, 525y, €30,000)
Pos	Name of Greyhound	Trap	SP	Time	Trainer
1st					
2nd					
3rd					
4th					
5th					
6th					

Callaway Pro Am Irish St Leger, Limerick (21 Nov, 550y, €30,000)
Pos	Name of Greyhound	Trap	SP	Time	Trainer
1st					
2nd					
3rd					
4th					
5th					
6th					

=== Calendar and results ===
Date	Competition	Venue	1st prize	Winner
17 Jan	ARC Cesarewitch	Central Park	£12,500	Mongys Wild
23 Jan	Coral Essex Vase	Romford	£10,000	Tiffield Tarquin
19 Feb	ARC Northern Puppy Derby	Newcastle	£12,500	Woltemade
21 Feb	Golden Jacket	Monmore	£20,000	Mongys Wild
28 Feb	Ladbrokes Winter Derby	Monmore	£10,000	Bruce Bay
28 Feb	Tote Gold Cup	Shelbourne	€16,000	Coloursaregreen
7 Mar	Juvenile Classic	Tralee	€10,000	Ballymac Deniro
8 Mar	Time Irish Cesarewitch	Mullingar	€10,000	Ballinabola Joe
14 Mar	Sandy Lane Sprint	Oxford	£3,000	Beaming Isla
16 Mar	BGBF British Breeders Stakes	Nottingham	£12,500	
20 Mar	Coral Golden Sprint	Romford	£10,000	
20 Mar	The Deadly Kennels McCalmont Cup	Kilkenny	€15,000	
28 Mar	Premier Greyhound Racing Puppy Derby	Monmore	£20,000	
29 Mar	ARC Kent Plate	Central Park	£12,500	
29 Mar	bet365 Hunt Cup	Oxford	£10,000	
4 Apr	Bresbet Easter Cup	Shelbourne	€25,000	
11 Apr	Arena Racing Company Laurels	Dunstall Park	£12,500	
19 Apr	KAB Maiden Derby	Oxford	£10,000	
18 Apr	Arena Racing Company Grand Prix	Sunderland	£12,500	
18 Apr	Con & Annie Kirby Memorial	Limerick	€80,000	
25 Apr	Coral Brighton Belle	Hove	£10,000	
26 Apr	BresBet Gymcrack	Sheffield	£17,500	
2 May	Droopys Stud Select Stakes	Waterford	€10,000	
2 May	Shelbourne 600	Shelbourne	€15,000	
4 May	Carrick Aldo at stud National Produce	Clonmel	€20,000	
17 May	Oxfordshire Sprint	Oxford	tbc	
6 Jun	Star Sports & TRC Events & Leisure English Greyhound Derby	Towcester	£175,000	
12 Jun	Callaway ProAm at Stud Race of Champions	Tralee	€15,000	
13 Jun	Sporting Press Online Oaks	Shelbourne	€25,000	
27 Jun	ARC Kent Silver Salver	Central Park	£12,500	
27 Jun	Donal Beatty Memorial Corn Cuchulainn	Shelbourne	€10,500	
4 Jul	Centenary Agri Tipperary Cup	Thurles	€7,200	
4 Jul	Boylesports Champion Stakes	Shelbourne	€20,000	
5 Jul	Time Three Steps to Victory	Sheffield	£10,000	
10 Jul	Coral Coronation Cup	Romford	£10,000	
10 Jul	Guys and Dolls	Romford	tbc	
12 Jul	Time Dundalk International	Dundalk	€20,000	
12 Jul	Time Greyhound Nutrition Juvenile	Towcester	£10,000	
23 Jul	Time Greyhound Feed Northern Flat	Newcastle	£12,500	
23 Jul	ARC Angel of the North	Newcastle	£7,500	
25 Jul	Time Irish Puppy Derby	Shelbourne	€25,000	
26 Jul	Pall Mall	Oxford	£10,000	
1 Aug	Coral Sussex Cup	Hove	£10,000	
1 Aug	Premier Greyhound Racing Regency	Hove	£20,000	
14 Aug	Bar One Racing Irish Sprint Cup	Dundalk	€20,000	
22 Aug	Ladbrokes Summer Stayers Classic	Monmore	£10,000	
22 Aug	Ladbrokes Gold Cup	Monmore	£10,000	
31 Aug	ARC Puppy Classic	Nottingham	£12,500	
31 Aug	ARC Select Stakes	Nottingham	£12,500	
12 Sep	Boylesports Irish Greyhound Derby	Shelbourne	€125,000	
16 Sep	Click Competitions East Anglian Derby	Yarmouth	£15,000	
18 Sep	Coral Romford Puppy Cup	Romford	£10,000	
19 Sep	ARC Birmingham Cup	Dunstall Park	£12,500	
19 Sep	PGR St Leger	Dunstall Park	£20,000	
20 Sep	77th Produce Stakes	Towcester	£10,000	
11 Oct	Untold Racing Stewards Cup	Star Pelaw	tbc	
17 Oct	BarOne Racing Irish Laurels	Cork	€30,000	
17 Oct	Premier Greyhound Racing Kent Derby	Central Park	£20,000	
18 Oct	Steel City Cup	Sheffield	£11,500	
23 Oct	Premier Greyhound Racing Champion Stakes	Romford	£20,000	
24 Oct	Premier Greyhound Racing Oaks	Dunstall Park	£20,000	
2 Nov	Puppy Collar	Oxford	£10,000	
8 Nov	Coral Gold Collar	Hove	£10,000	
8 Nov	George Curtis/Ballyregan Bob Memorial	Hove	£10,000	
20 Nov	Premier Greyhound Racing Classic	Sunderland	£20,000	
21 Nov	Callaway Pro Am at Stud Irish St Leger	Limerick	€30,000	
29 Nov	bet365 Challenge Cup	Oxford	£10,000	
30 Nov	Premier Greyhound Racing Eclipse	Nottingham	£20,000	
12 Dec	Coral Olympic	Hove	£10,000	
20 Dec	bet365 Puppy Oaks	Oxford	£10,000	
21 Dec	ARC National Sprint	Nottingham	£7,500	
26 Dec	Premier Greyhound Racing All England Cup	Newcastle	£20,000	

To be arranged/confirmed

- Blue Riband
- TV Trophy
- Scurry Gold Cup
- English Puppy Derby
