= Dunstall Park =

Dunstall Park may refer to the following:

- Dunstall Park Greyhound Stadium, in Wolverhampton, England
- Dunstall Park railway station, in Wolverhampton, England
