= Northern Puppy Derby =

British greyhound racing competition

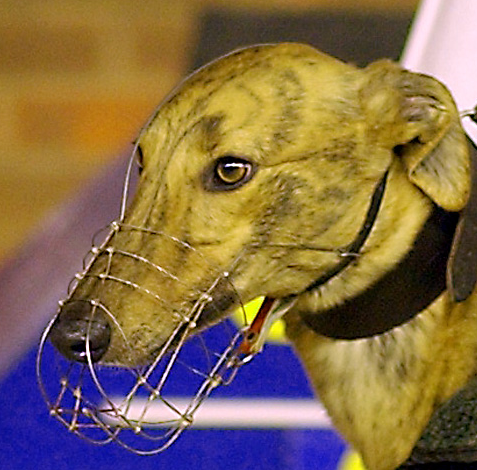
- 2001 champion Farloe Chief
- Class: Category 1
- Location: Newcastle Stadium
- Inaugurated: 1994
- Sponsor: Arena Racing Company

Race information
- Distance: 480 metres
- Surface: Sand
- Qualification: Puppies only (15-24 months old)
- Purse: £12,500 (winner)

The Northern Puppy Derby is a greyhound racing competition held annually at Newcastle Stadium. The race is confined to puppies (greyhounds under the age of two years old).

== History ==
It was inaugurated in 1994 at Sunderland Stadium but was switched to sister track Newcastle in 2010. The event was traditionally held in October but from 2022 was held during February.

== Sponsors ==
- 1994–1994 (Dransfield)
- 1995–2002 (Regal)
- 2003–2018 (William Hill)
- 2019–2019 (Alconex)
- 2021–2026 (Arena Racing Company)

== Venues and distances ==
- 1995–2009 (Sunderland, 450 metres)
- 2010–2025 (Newcastle, 480 metres)

== Past winners ==
Year	Winner	Breeding	Trainer	Time (sec)	SP	Note/ref
1994	Justright Melody	Farloe Melody – Farloe Mineola	Tom Robinson (Private)	27.47	1/2f	
1995	Droopys Aldo	Slippys Quest - The Other Point	Henry Tasker (Perry Barr)	27.36	3/1	
1996	El Premier	Adraville Bridge – Droopys Alivsa	Linda Mullins (Walthamstow)	27.34	5/2	
1997	Knockeevan Dan	Mustang Jack - Rubys Bridge	Graham Calvert (Sunderland)	27.54	2/5f	
1998	Tracys Glory	Ayr Flyer – TracysPopsy	Pat Ryan (Private)	27.13	9/4	
1999	Knockeevan Star	Slaneyside Hare - Rubys Bridge	Michael Bacon (Belle Vue)	27.53	4/6f	
2000	Harsu Super	Ratify – Yes Super	John McGee Sr. (Private)	27.51	4/5f	
2001	Farloe Chief	Come On Ranger – Come On Dot	Otto Kueres (Belle Vue)	27.36	6/4f	
2002	Lodgeview Blue	Larkhill Jo – Ena Harkness	Danny Talbot (Kinsley)	27.21	7/2	
2003	Dairyland Sue	Roanokee – Ciabatta	Pat Rosney (Monmore)	27.14	5/2	
2004	Toms View	Toms The Best – Deneview Pearl	Paul Rutherford (Brough Park)	26.82	9/4	
2005	Calzaghe Boyo	Daves Mentor – Ballymac Bargain	Ted Soppitt (Private)	26.90	5/2	
2006	Droopys Mcandrew	Velvet Commander – Droopys Kristin	Ted Soppitt (Private)	27.24	9/4	
2007	Farloe Reason	Droopys Maldini – Farloe Oyster	Charlie Lister (Private)	26.92	2/1	
2008	HucklesKez	Brett Lee – Quare Star	Paul Young (Romford)	26.99	4/6f	
2009	Westmead Maldini	Droopys Maldini – Mega Delight	Nick Savva (Private)	28.51	6/1	
2010	Ten Large Down	Royal Impact – Honey Princess	Diane Henry (Private)	26.84	5/4	
2011	Mill Maximus	Boherna On Air - Unreal	Kelly Macari (Sunderland)	28.38	1/1f	
2012	TeejaysBluehawk	Westmead Hawk – Droopys June	Paul Young (Romford)	28.38	8/1	
2013	Redbrick Stuart	Zigzag Stewart – Valentia Show	Charlie Lister OBE (Private)	28.42	4/1	
2014	Kneejerkreaction	Crash – Cornamaddy Daisy	Stephen Atkinson (Private)	28.42	3/1	
2015	Droopys Buick	Yeah Man – Droopys Hilda	Jimmy Wright (Newcastle)	28.54	2/1	
2016	Kildallon Bolt	Barefoot Bolt - Kildallon Lee	Heather Dimmock (Towcester)	28.65	1/2f	
2017	Droopys Zephyr	Romeo Recruit - Droopys Quinta	Angela Harrison (Newcastle)	28.50	8/1	
2018	Droopys Trawler	Laughil Blake - Droopys Sylvia	Andrew Wood (Shawfield)	28.76	8/1	
2019	Levante Beach	Droopys Jet - Pots And Pans	Angela Harrison (Newcastle)	28.89	4/5f	
2020	No race due to (COVID-19 pandemic)					
2021	Jaguar Macie	Droopys Jet – Droopys Breeze	Graham Rankin (Pelaw Grange)	28.52	13/8f	
2022	Freedom Alibi	Confident Rankin – Freedom Dream	Tom Heilbron (Newcastle)	28.62	8/1	
2023	Links Maverick	Grangeview Ten – Havana Lottie	Tom Heilbron (Newcastle)	28.61	4/7f	
2024	Clona Curly	Droopys Sydney – Newinn Cuckoo	Diane Henry (Towcester)	28.23	9/2	
2025	Droopys Deploy	Malachi – Droopys Charm	Robert Gleeson (Ireland)	28.56	8/11f	
2026	Woltemade	Ballymac Finn – Ballymac Minton	James Fenwick (Newcastle)	28.30	10/3	
