= Perry Barr Greyhound Stadium =

Perry Barr Greyhound Stadium may refer to:

- Birchfield Ladbroke Stadium
- Perry Barr Stadium
