= Scurry Gold Cup =

British greyhound racing competition

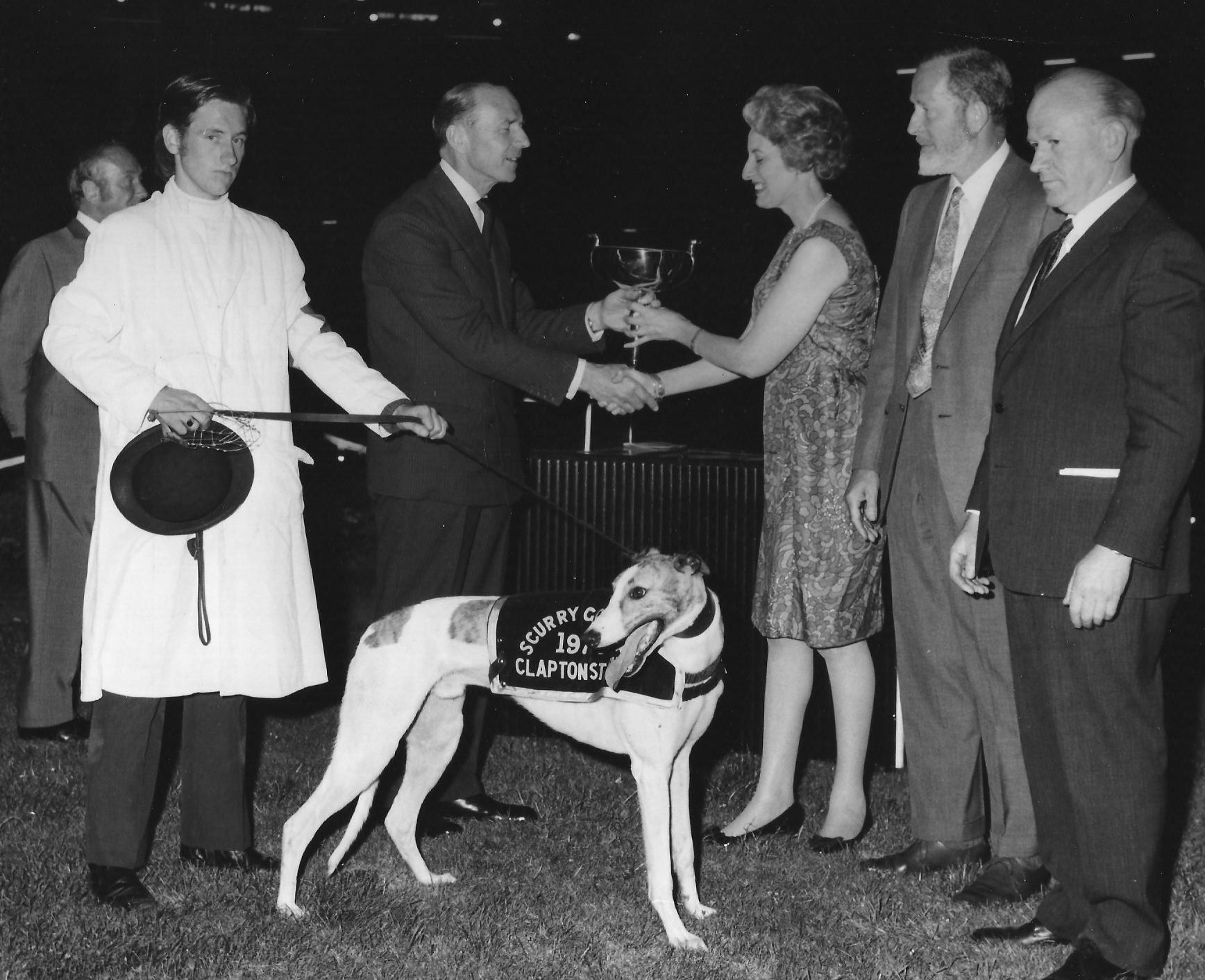
- Don't Gambol, twice Scurry champion
- Class: Original Classic (currently Category 2)
- Inaugurated: 1928
- Sponsor: Arena Racing Company

Race information
- Distance: 270 metres
- Surface: Sand
- Track: Dunstall Park Greyhound Stadium
- Purse: £7,500 (winner)

The Scurry Gold Cup is an original classic greyhound racing competition currently run at Dunstall Park Greyhound Stadium.

It was first run at Clapton Stadium from 1928 until its closure in 1973. The event moved to Slough Stadium in 1974 which subsequently closed in 1986. The third move resulted in Catford Stadium hosting the race from 1987 until yet another closure forced the race to end in 2002. After a two-year wait, a new home was finally found at Perry Barr Stadium until 2009 when the GRA switched the competition to sister track Belle Vue Stadium.

With the closure of Belle Vue in 2020, the future of the competition was unknown but the British Greyhound Breeders Forum stepped in to sponsor the race (held at Harlow Stadium) before it returned to Perry Barr in 2021. The competition switched to Dunstall Park in 2025, when the Arena Racing Company moved the greyhound operation from Birmingham to Wolverhampton.

== Venues and distances ==
- 1928–1973 (Clapton, 400 y)
- 1974–1974 (Slough, 475 y)
- 1975–1978 (Slough, 434 m)
- 1979–1986 (Slough, 442 m)
- 1987–2002 (Catford, 385 m)
- 2005–2008 (Perry Barr, 275 m)
- 2009–2019 (Belle Vue, 260 m)
- 2020–2020 (Harlow, 238 m)
- 2021–2023 (Perry Barr, 275 m)
- 2025–2025 (Dunstall Park, 270 m)

== Sponsors ==
- 2002–2002 (Brake Brothers)
- 2018–2019 (BAPP Group of Companies)
- 2020–2020 (British Greyhound Breeders Forum)
- 2021–2025 (Arena Racing Company)

== Past winners ==
Year	Winner	Breeding	Trainer	Time (sec)	SP	Notes/ref
1928	Cruiseline Boy	Woodne Bridge III-Irish Life III	Paddy McEllistrim (Wimbledon)	24.91	4/7f	
1929	Loose Card	King of Spades-Lightfoot	J Madden (White City, Manchester)	24.13	100/8	
1930	Barlock	Brilliant Victory-Bellfield	John 'Jack' Kennedy (Harringay)	24.19	100/7	
1931	Brave Enough	Lawmaker-Linguist II	Harry Buck (Harringay)	23.62	7/1	
1932	Experts Boast	Jovial Judge-Moth	Sid Jennings (Wembley)	23.61	4/6f	
1933	Creamery Border	Border Line-Cook	Arthur 'Doc' Callanan (Wembley)	23.31	13/8	
1934	Brilliant Bob	Other Days-Birchfield Bessie	Sidney Orton (Wimbledon)	23.47	9/4f	
1935	Jack's Joke	Harsac-Amethyst	Claude Champion (Catford)	23.15	10/11f	track record
1936	Mitzvah	Morcar-Midge	Arthur 'Doc' Callanan (Wembley)	23.29	5/2jf	
1937	Hexham Bridge	Rally Round-Dainty Duchess	Bill Cowell (Southend)	23.37	3/1	
1938	Orlucks Best	Orluck-Playway	Charlie Ashley (Harringay)	23.24	11/8f	
1939	Silver Wire	Silver Seal II-Live Wiring	Charles Green (Derby)	23.52	9/4f	
1945	Country Life	Border Mutton-Mah Jong	Paddy McEllistrim (Wimbledon)	23.50	10/1	
1946	Mischievous Manhattan	Manhattan Midnight-Mischievous Riot	Paddy Fortune (Wimbledon)	23.40	5/4f	
1947	Rimmells Black	Manhattan Midnight-Drishogue	Stan Biss (Clapton)	23.11	1/1f	
1948	Local Interprize	Ruby Border-Mythical Daisy	Stan Biss (Clapton)	23.04	5/4f	
1949	Burndennet Brook	Great Climber-Cherokee Girl	Leslie Reynolds (Wembley)	23.48	5/2	
1950	Gortnagory	Glenview Special-Bloods Romance	Norman Merchant (Private)	23.47	3/1	
1951	Defence Leader	Bellas Prince-Cleopatra	William Howard Mills (Private)	22.99	4/1	
1952	Monachdy Girlie	Local Interprize-Golden Gleam	Jimmy Jowett (Clapton)	23.08	4/1	
1953	Rolling Mike	Mad Tanist-Brilliant Memory	Jimmy Jowett (Clapton)	22.77	5/2f	
1954	Demon King	Imperial Dancer-Pretty Waltzer	Jack Harvey (Wembley)	22.84	4/9f	
1955	Chance Me Paddy	Paddy The Champion-Verges Cottage	Len Linney (Catford)	22.85	2/1f	
1956	Belingas Customer	Quare Customer-Another Belinger	Ronnie Melville (Wembley)	22.82	100/30	
1957	Lisbrook Chieftain	Jeffs Pal-Lisburn Linda	Reg Holland (Private)	23.09	6/1	
1958	Beware Champ	The Grand Champion-Beware of Me	George Waterman (Wimbledon)	22.71	8/13f	
1959	Gorey Airways	Imperial Airways-Geffs Linnett	Jimmy Jowett (Clapton)	22.95	9/4	
1960	Gorey Airways	Imperial Airways-Geffs Linnett	Jimmy Jowett (Clapton)	22.48	5/4f	
1961	Palms Printer	The Grand Champion-Palm Shadow	Greg Doyle (Clapton)	22.63	10/11f	
1962	Hi Darkie	Hi There-Ballylion Ostrich	Ray Wilkes (Private)	22.95	6/4f	
1963	Lucky Joan II	Recorded Course-Astraea	John Bassett (Clapton)	22.70	3/1	
1964	Salthill Sand	Crazy Parachute-Sarah Sands	John Bassett (Clapton)	22.72	100/6	
1965	After You	Mile Bush Pride – Perfect Queen	John Bassett (Clapton)	22.47	7/1	
1966	Geddys Blaze	Greenane Wonder – Geddys Queenie	Stan Gudgin (Clapton)	22.79	9/2	
1967	Carry on Oregon	Oregon Prince – Gormanstown Wonder	Clare Orton (Wimbledon)	22.62	1/2f	
1968	Foyle Tonic	Good Brandy – Friendly Palm	Paddy Keane (Clapton)	22.59	15/8f	
1969	Ace of Trumps	Maryville Hi – Ravens Surprise	John Coleman (Romford)	22.85	1/1f	
1970	Don't Gambol	Prairie Flash – One For Minnie	Paddy McEvoy (Wimbledon)	22.48	3/1	
1971	Don't Gambol	Prairie Flash – One For Minnie	Paddy McEvoy (Wimbledon)	22.73	4/11f	
1972	Cricket Bunny	Printers Prince-Cricket Lady	Joe Booth (Private)	22.77	6/1	
1973	Casa Miel	Kilbelin Style-Ballygill Piper	Joe Pickering (White City)	22.83	7/2	
1974	Westmead Valley	Carry on Oregon-Cricket Dance	Hugh McEntyre (Bletchley)	26.24	11/10f	
1975	Longnor Lad	Cash For Dan-Thump The Thugs	Ben Parsons (Hall Green)	26.77	4/1	
1976	Xmas Holiday	Supreme Fun-Marys Snowball	Phil Rees Sr. (Wimbledon)	26.67	11/10f	
1977	Wired To Moon	Monalee Champion-April Atomic	George Curtis (Brighton)	26.63	4/1	
1978	Greenfield Fox	Burgess Heather-Skipping Chick	Ted Dickson (Slough)	27.00	5/2	
1979	Northway Point	Fionntra Frolic-Sound of Terror	George Morrow (Cambridge)	27.20	20/1	
1980	Willing Slave	Nameless Star-Paradise Rose	Ted Dickson (Slough)	27.11	2/1	
1981	Longcross Smokey	Knockrour Bank-Clare View	Philip Rees Jr. (Wimbledon)	27.17	5/1	
1982	Yankee Express	Pecos Jerry-Kings Comet	George Curtis (Hove)	27.19	5/2	
1983	Yankee Express	Pecos Jerry-Kings Comet	George Curtis (Hove)	26.84	8/11f	
1984	Yankee Express	Pecos Jerry-Kings Comet	George Curtis (Hove)	27.03	11/10f	
1985	Daleys Gold	Lindas Champion-Ballinderry Moth	Jerry Fisher (Reading)	27.23	4/5f	
1986	Mollifrend Lucky	Lauries Panther-Top Princess	Colin Packham (Reading)	26.62	5/4f	
1987	Rapid Mover	Sand Man-Rapid Lady	Fred Wiseman (Private)	23.62	1/1f	
1988	Farncombe Black	Soda Fountain-Grove Black	Ernie Gaskin Sr. (Private)	23.53	8/13f	
1989	Nans Brute	Curryhills Brute-Nans Flyer	Bill Masters (Hove)	23.59	16/1	
1990	Ready Rubbed	Dads Bank-Elton Slave	John McGee Sr. (Hackney)	23.76	5/1	
1991	Portun Flier	Curryhills Fox-Derroon Bal	Paddy Milligan (Catford)	26.43	2/1f	
1992	Glengar Desire	Kanturk Chipper-Glengar Moss	Jimmy Fletcher (Canterbury)	23.96	5/1	
1993	Kind of Magic	Kilshannig Sonny-Daisys Queen	Lizi Miller (Oxford)	23.82	5/1	
1994	Rabatino	Poor James-Hymenstown Rose	John McGee Sr. (Canterbury)	23.57	7/2	
1995	Demesne Bear	Barefoot Chief-Demesne Joy	Peter Payne (Romford)	23.68	10/11f	
1996	Come on Royal	Concentration-Queen of Country	Barry McIntosh (Canterbury)	23.58	4/1	
1997	Shoreham Beach	Slaneyside Hare-Ballinora Jill	Diane Stinchcombe (Reading)	23.78	10/1	
1998	Im Frankie	Herbie Lambug-Fast Flo	Mick Puzey (Walthamstow)	24.40	9/1	
1999	Lissenaire Luke	Ardfert Dan-Suir Dew	Charlie Lister OBE (Private)	23.49	3/1jf	
2000	El Boss	Pepes Dilemma-Bid You Joy	Linda Mullins (Walthamstow)	23.65	5/4f	
2001	Kalooki Jet	In Question-Raceline Charlie	Sonja Spiers (Catford)	24.20	7/4jf	
2002	Letter Slippy	Shanless Slippy-Slick City	Patsy Byrne (Wimbledon)	23.73	5/2	
2005	Laser Beam	Droopys Vieri-I Say Manor	Harry Williams (Sunderland)	16.06	1/1f	
2006	Ballymac Rooster	Roanokee-Ballymac Pepes	Carly Philpott (Private)	16.08	7/4	
2007	Horseshoe Ping	Top Honcho-Lucy May	Jim Reynolds (Romford)	16.19	4/11f	
2008	Boherbradda Mac	Hondo Mac – Boherbradda Kay	Harry Williams (Sunderland)	15.95	7/4f	
2009	Centaur Allstar	Hondo Black – Quick Deal	Chris Allsopp (Monmore)	15.10	7/4f	
2010	Slick Citi	Honcho Classic – Cooly Pantera	Keith Allsop (Private)	15.19	4/1	
2011	Drumcove Lad	Scart Lad – Drumcove Fancy	Chris Allsopp (Monmore)	14.96	2/1jf	Track record
2012	Drumna Ice	Ballymac Maeve – DrumnaTink	Charlie Lister OBE (Private)	15.22	11/10f	
2013	Droopys Quincy	Central City – Droopys June	Seamus Cahill (Hove)	15.01	6/4f	
2014	Baliff Cairo	Vans Escalade – Ballymac Vicky	Ian Aylward (Private)	15.36	7/1	
2015	Brogan Tee Bone	Head Bound – Downdaniel Amy	Hayley Keightley (Private)	15.27	3/1	
2016	Walshes Hill	Zero Ten – Incredible Lulu	Jimmy Wright (Newcastle)	15.14	4/7f	
2017	Roxholme Hat	Ballymac Vic – Emma Honey	Hayley Keightley (Private)	14.82	1/1f	
2018	Troy Bella	Tyrur Big Mike – Fire Height Brid	David Mullins (Romford)	15.07	7/1	
2019	Droopys Reel	Azza Azza Azza – Droopys Dorothy	Angela Harrison (Newcastle)	15.03	11/4	
2020	Dundee June	Kinloch Brae – Sevenofnine	David Lewis (Swindon)	26.88	9/1	
2021	Crossfield Dusty	Droopys Jet – Crossfield Kate	Patrick Janssens (Towcester)	16.26	10/11f	
2022	Gougane Jet	Droopys Jet – Paper Doll	Mark Wallis (Henlow)	15.80	4/5f	Track record
2023	Quarteira	Ballymac Best – Kilara Jessie	Mark Wallis (Henlow)	16.15	1/1f	
2024	Rioja Oisin	Droopys Sydney – Oisins Choice	Kevin Hutton (Oxford)	15.87	6/4f	
2025	Shadow Storm	Ballymac Best – Kilara Jessie	Richard Rees (Brighton)	15.63	13/8f	
