= Greyhound racing in the United Kingdom =

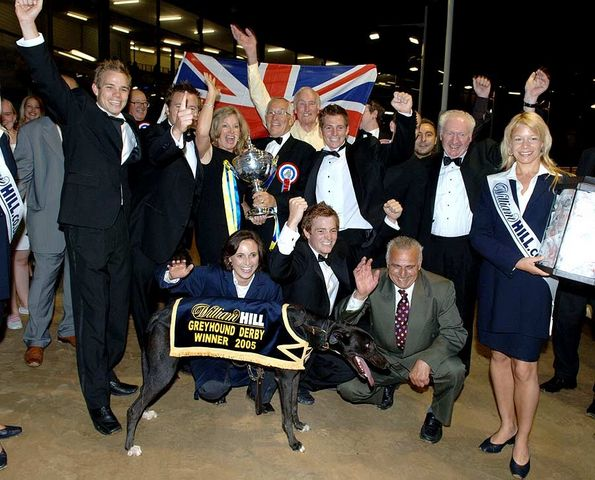
- Two-time Derby winner Westmead Hawk
- Start date: 24 July 1926 at Belle Vue Stadium
- Nations: England excludes Northern Ireland

Greyhound racing is a sport in the United Kingdom. The industry uses a totalisator system with on-course and off-course betting available.

Attendances have declined since the mid-20th century.

As of January 2025, there are 18 licensed stadiums in the United Kingdom (excluding Northern Ireland).

== History ==
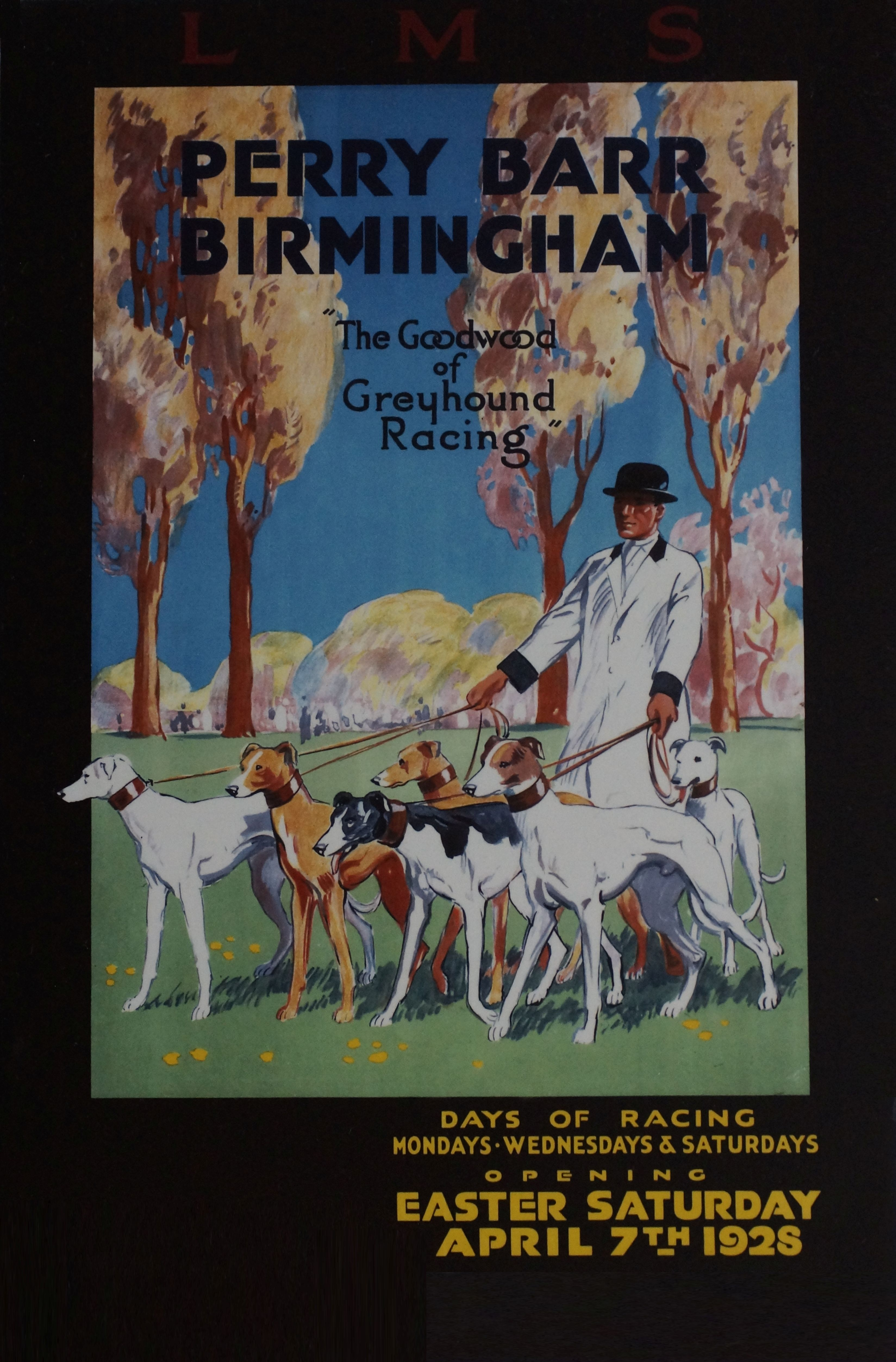
London, Midland and Scottish Railway poster advertising the opening of Perry Barr Greyhound Stadium in Birmingham, in April 1928

Modern greyhound racing evolved from a form of hunting called coursing, in which a dog runs after a live game animal – usually a rabbit or hare. The first official coursing meeting was held in 1776 at Swaffham, Norfolk. The rules of the Swaffham Coursing Society, started by Lord Orford, specified that only two greyhounds were to course a single hare.

Coursing by proxy with an artificial lure was introduced at Hendon, on 11 September 1876. Six greyhounds raced over a 400-yard straight course, chasing an artificial hare. This was the first attempt to introduce mechanical racing to the UK; however it did not catch on at the time.

The oval track and mechanical hare were introduced to Britain in 1926, by Charles Munn, an American, in association with Major Lyne-Dixson, a key figure in coursing. Finding other supporters proved to be rather difficult, and with the General Strike of 1926 looming, the two men scoured the country to find others who would join them. Eventually they met Brigadier-General Critchley, who in turn introduced them to Sir William Gentle. Between them they raised £22,000 and launched the Greyhound Racing Association. On 24 July 1926, in front of 1,700 spectators, the first modern greyhound race in Great Britain took place at Belle Vue Stadium, where seven greyhounds raced round an oval circuit to catch an electric artificial hare. They then hurried to open tracks in London at White City and Harringay.

The first three years of racing were financially successful, with attendances of 5.5 million in 1927, 13.7 million in 1928 and 16 million in 1929. Racing peaked just after the Second World War, for example, totalisator turnover during 1946 was £196,431,430 Attendances increased significantly; the 1946 English Greyhound Derby saw over 50,000 attending the first round heats and £1 million changing hands in the final alone.

The industry experienced a decline beginning in the early 1960s, after the 1960 UK Betting and Gaming Act permitted off-course cash betting. From 1961 to 1969 there were 21 National Greyhound Racing Club (NGRC) registered track closures and many independent (unaffiliated to a governing body) track closures. Further factors included the creation of the National Lottery and the increase of social activities made available to the general public. There were 91 NGRC track closures alone recorded from 1960 to 2010.

Sponsorship, limited television coverage, and the later abolition of on-course betting tax partially offset this decline, with the industry experiencing growth during the 1980s before declining again in the 21st century.

In 2025 the last track in Scotland closed and Wales' only track will close between 2027 and 2030.

== Racing ==
The greyhound racing industry in Great Britain was divided into two sectors: the registered sector under the Greyhound Board of Great Britain (GBGB), and a defunct sector known as 'independent racing' or 'flapping' which was unaffiliated with a governing body.

=== Registered racing ===
GBGB Logo

Registered racing in Great Britain is regulated by the GBGB, formerly the NGRC, and has been UKAS accredited since 2010. All in the registered sector are subject to the GBGB Rules of Racing and the Directions of the Stewards, who set the standards for greyhound welfare and racing integrity, from racecourse facilities and trainers' kennels to retirement of greyhounds. There are Stewards' inquiries, and then disciplinary action is taken against anyone found failing to comply.

The registered sector consists of 18 racecourses and approximately 500 trainers, 3,000 kennel staff and 700 racecourse officials. Greyhound owners number 15,000, with approximately 6,000 greyhounds registered annually for racing.

=== Independent racing ===
Independent racing, also known as 'flapping', was a form of racing that required no central registration or licensing and no code of practice. In England, standards for welfare and integrity were set by local government, but there was no governing or other regulatory body. The last independent track closed in March 2025.

== Stadiums ==
In the late 1940s, there were seventy-seven licensed tracks in the United Kingdom, of which thirty-three were in London.

=== Registered stadiums ===
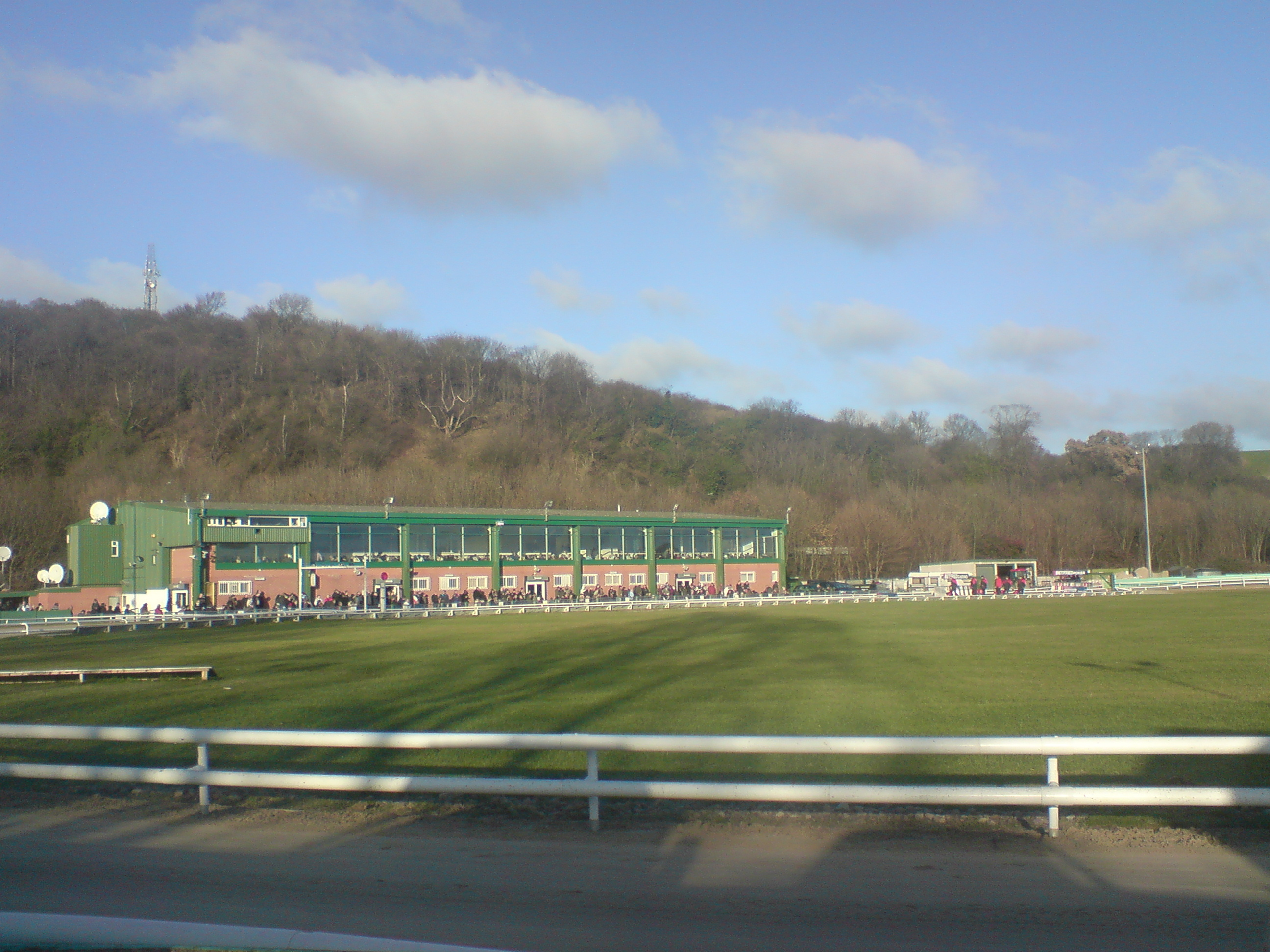
Nottingham Stadium

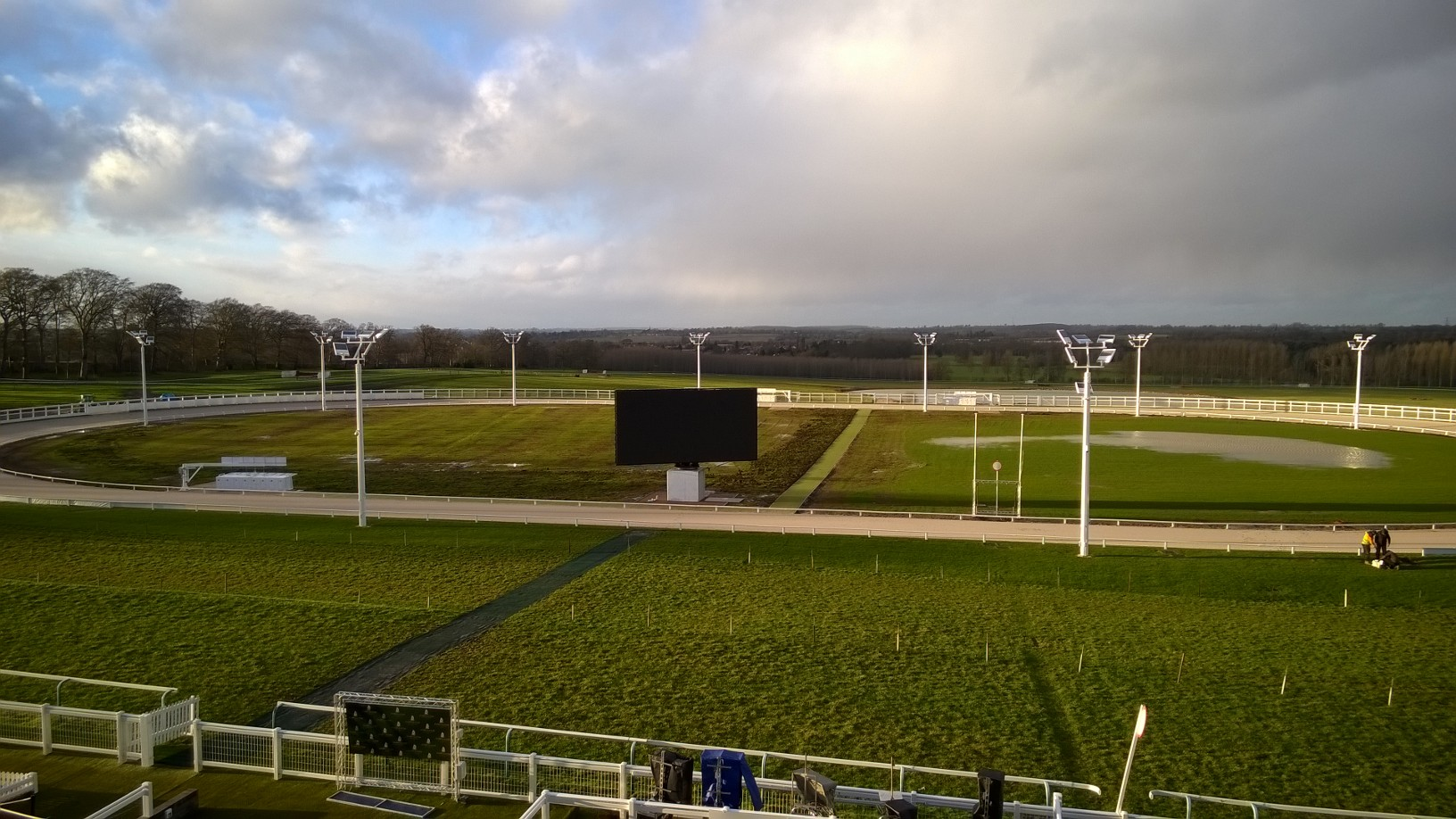
Towcester Stadium

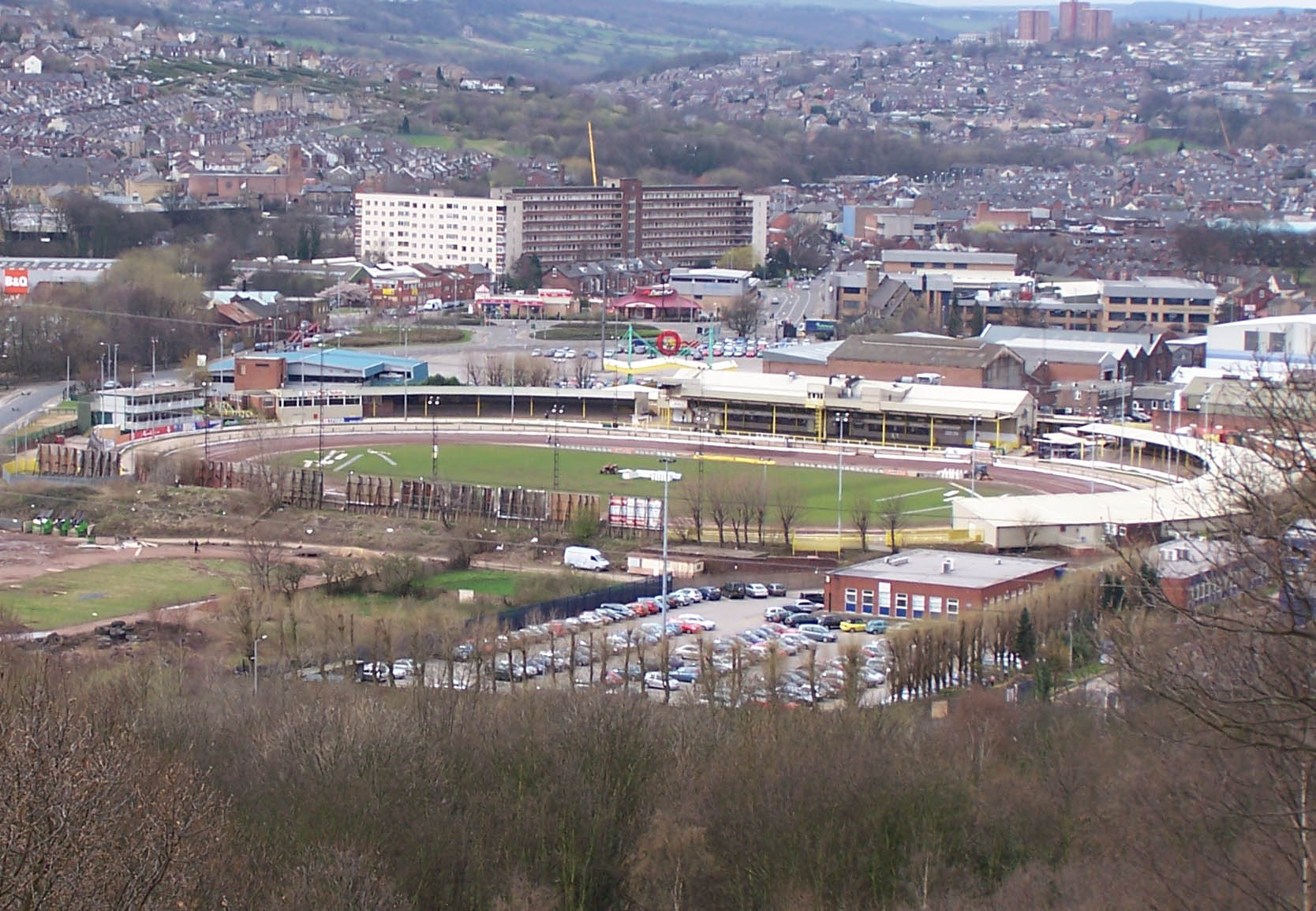
Sheffield Stadium

There are 16 active GBGB registered stadiums in the United Kingdom. There are no active tracks in Scotland and just one in Wales. Northern Irish tracks do not come under the control of the GBGB.

- Brighton and Hove Stadium
- Central Park Stadium, Sittingbourne
- Doncaster Stadium, Doncaster
- Dunstall Park Greyhound Stadium, Wolverhampton
- Harlow Stadium, Harlow
- Kinsley Stadium, Kinsley
- Monmore Green Stadium, Wolverhampton
- Newcastle Stadium, Newcastle upon Tyne
- Nottingham Stadium, Nottingham
- Owlerton Stadium, Sheffield
- Pelaw Grange, Chester-le-Street
- Romford Stadium, London
- Sunderland Stadium, Sunderland
- Towcester Stadium, Towcester
- Valley Stadium, Ystrad Mynach, Wales
- Yarmouth Stadium, Great Yarmouth

== Competitions ==
There are various types and levels of competitions in Britain, with prize money reaching £15,737,122.

Greyhound Derby The English Greyhound Derby currently has a winner's prize of £175,000. The competition (held at Towcester) has six rounds and attracts around 180 entries each year. In addition, the Irish Greyhound Derby, held at Shelbourne Park, is open to British greyhounds. There used to be a Scottish Greyhound Derby and Welsh Greyhound Derby but the events finished in 2019 and 1977 respectively. In 2010, a short lived Northern Irish Derby was introduced.

Category One Race These races must have minimum prize money of £12,500. They can be run between one and four rounds but must be completed within a 15-day period, except for special circumstances. In any event the competition must be completed within 18 days. Category One races replaced competitions called classic races in the 1990s.

Category Two Race These races must have minimum prize money of £5,000. They can be run with one, two or three rounds but must be completed within a 15-day period.

Category Three Race These races must have minimum prize money of £1,000. They can be run over one or two rounds and within a nine-day period. A category three race can be staged over one day but must have minimum prize money of £500.

Invitation Race A special type of open race usually staged by the promoter in support on the night of other opens. This will be proposed to the committee by the Greyhound Board or by a promoter, with the racers being invited into the competition rather than the usual process. The minimum prize money for these races is £750.

Minor Open Race This is any other open race. The minimum added money for these races is £150.

== Records ==
In 1986, Ballyregan Bob beat the record for the most number of consecutive races won by winning his 32nd race, besting the record set by Joe Dump in the United States in 1978 and 1979.

== Graded racing ==
This is any other race staged at a track, and prize money is varied. This kind of racing is the core of most stadiums and some of the racing can be viewed in betting shops on the Bookmakers Afternoon Greyhound Service (BAGS). The Racing Manager selects the greyhounds based on ability and organises them into traps (called seeding) and classes (usually 1–9) with grade 1 being the best class. The sex and weight of the greyhound has no bearing.

- A class represent standard races
- B class represent standard races+
- D class represent sprint races
- S class represent staying races
- M class represent marathon races
- P class represent puppy races
- H class represent hurdle races
- Hcp class represents handicap races

+ Only used if a track has an alternative standard distance.

== Racing jacket colours and starting traps ==
Greyhound racing in Britain has a standard colour scheme. The starting traps (equipment that the greyhound starts a race in) determines the colour. Races with eight greyhounds are no longer held.

- Trap 1 = Red with White numeral
- Trap 2 = Blue with White numeral
- Trap 3 = White with Black numeral
- Trap 4 = Black with White numeral
- Trap 5 = Orange with Black numeral
- Trap 6 = Black & White Stripes with Red numeral
- Trap 7 = Green with Red numeral (no longer used)
- Trap 8 = Yellow and Black with White numeral (no longer used)

A racing jacket worn by a reserve bears an additional letter 'R' prominently on each side.

== Types of hare system ==
- Swaffham - windsock on metal plate that runs in a groove on a metal rail at ground level, 2 versions outside/inside of track.
- Sumner - soft toy hare on a small arm attached to a 30 cm (approx) raised rail, 2 versions outside/inside of track.
- Bramich - soft toy hare (suspended) on a long arm attached to a raised rail, 2 versions outside/inside of track.

== Racing greyhounds and welfare ==
=== Treatment of racing greyhounds ===
Greyhound racing at registered stadiums in Great Britain is regulated by the GBGB. Greyhounds are not kept at the tracks and are instead housed in the kennels of trainers and transported to the tracks to race. Licensed kennels have to fall within specific guidelines and rules and are checked by officials to make sure the treatment of racing greyhounds is within the rules. In 2018, licensing and inspecting trainer's kennels was conducted through the government-approved, UKAS accredited method.

Greyhounds require microchipping, annual vaccinations against distemper, infectious canine hepatitis, parvovirus, leptospirosis, a vaccination to minimize outbreaks of diseases such as kennel cough and a retirement bond before being allowed to race. All tracks are required to have veterinary room facilities on site. When a greyhound is due to race or trial at a track its health and condition must be checked by the veterinary surgeon at kennelling time and again before they are permitted to race, the weight must be recorded by officials and random drugs tests are conducted. From 1 April 2023, all vehicles transporting racing greyhounds must have air-conditioning.

In 2023, the Scottish Animal Welfare Commission, an advisory body to the Scottish Government, published an independent report on greyhound racing in Scotland. The report noted that Scotland had a single independent track (Thornton) and also considered, hypothetically, whether GBGB regulation might improve welfare. The Commission concluded that where gambling and commercial activity are involved "the risks of poor welfare outweigh the likely positive aspects" and stated that, on average, a dog bred for racing in Scotland "currently has poorer welfare than the average of other dogs in the population". The report recommended that no new greyhound tracks be permitted in Scotland and that independent veterinary oversight and data collection on injuries and fatalities be strengthened.

=== Injuries ===
Publication of comprehensive injury data is not mandated under the Welfare of Racing Greyhounds Regulations 2010, which require tracks to keep injury records but do not require their publication. In 2016, the House of Commons Environment, Food and Rural Affairs Committee expressed concern that injury statistics were not being published despite their collection being mandatory, stating that the industry's reluctance to publish such data "does not inspire confidence", and recommended that the Department for Environment, Food and Rural Affairs amend the Regulations to require publication of essential welfare data relating to injury, euthanasia and rehoming numbers. The Post Implementation Review subsequently recorded that the GBGB had agreed, on a non-regulatory basis, to publish from 2018 aggregate injury and euthanasia figures from GBGB tracks.

According to the 2024 injury and retirement summary, there were 3,809 injuries from 355,682 runs at GBGB-licensed tracks, an injury rate of 1.07%. The report covers greyhounds racing at the 21 tracks licensed by the GBGB in 2024. The most common injury category was hind limb muscle injuries (1,013; 0.28%), followed by hock injuries (718; 0.20%), wrist injuries (566; 0.16%), foot injuries (410; 0.12%), fore limb muscle injuries (491; 0.14%), fore long bone injuries (104; 0.03%) and hind long bone injuries (18; 0.01%). Other injuries accounted for 489 cases (0.14%). Track fatalities were 123 (0.03%).

=== Drug testing ===
The GBGB actively works to prevent the spread of drug usage within the registered greyhound racing sector. Attempts are made to recover urine samples from all six greyhounds in a race. Greyhounds from which samples can not be obtained for a certain number of consecutive races are subject to being ruled off the track. If a positive sample is found, violators are subject to penalties and loss of their racing licenses by the GBGB. The trainer of the greyhound is at all times the "absolute insurer" of the condition of the animal. The trainer is responsible for any positive test regardless of how the banned substance has entered the greyhound's system. Due to the increased practice of random testing, the number of positive samples has decreased.

Over a one-year period from 2017 to 2018, over 15,000 greyhounds were tested by the GBGB 'flying squad' which returned four positive cocaine tests. These cases resulted in disqualification or suspension for the offending parties.

=== Retirement ===
When the greyhounds finish their racing careers they are retired under the GBGB bond scheme (introduced in 2020) which ensures the homing costs are met. Owners may keep the dog for breeding or as pets, or they can send them to greyhound adoption groups. The GBGB have introduced measures to locate where racing greyhounds reside after they have retired from racing and from 2017 the retirement data has been available to the public. Concern among welfare groups is the well-being of some racing greyhounds who are not adopted upon their retirement, and that they may subsequently be put down or sold by their owners, some others are put down because they are not suitable for retirement. The GBGB require all owners to sign a retirement form indicating the retirement plans.

The main greyhound adoption organisation in Britain is the Greyhound Trust (GT). The GT is partly funded by the British Greyhound Racing Fund (BGRF), a body established in 1992 to receive voluntary contributions from bookmakers to support licensed greyhound racing. As of 2015, grants from the BGRF accounted for approximately 33% of the GT's rehoming costs, with funding totalling £1,400,000 that year.

There are also many independent organisations which find homes for retired Greyhounds. Several independent rescue and homing groups receive some funding from the industry but mainly rely on public donations. In 2016, 1,500 greyhounds were rehomed by independent groups. In 2018, several tracks introduced a scheme whereby every greyhound is found a home by the track, these include Kinsley and Doncaster. During 2020 many homing organisations including the Lincolnshire, Suffolk and Portsmouth Greyhound Trusts reported that all retired greyhounds were being homed and that there was a shortage. Concerns were raised that if the shortage of retired greyhounds continued it could force some homing organisations to close.

According to the GBGB's 2024 injury and retirement summary, 5,795 greyhounds (94% of those leaving the sport) were recorded as successfully retired. Of these, 1,618 (27.1%) were retained by their owner or trainer, 3,333 (55.8%) were retired via a charity or homing centre, 655 (11.0%) were rehomed by their owner or trainer, 174 (2.9%) were recorded for breeding, and 15 (0.3%) were recorded under other outcomes.

The same report recorded 386 deaths across the registered racing greyhound population (6.2%). These were categorised as 3 (0.1%) due to treatment costs, 4 (0.1%) where no home was found, 88 (1.5%) put to sleep on veterinary advice away from the track, 51 (0.9%) designated unsuitable for homing, 77 (1.3%) recorded as sudden death, 123 (2.1%) put to sleep on humane grounds at the track, and 40 (0.7%) recorded as terminal illness, natural causes or other.

== Ban on greyhound racing ==
Greyhound racing in Great Britain is regulated by the GBGB and accredited by United Kingdom Accreditation Service. Racing is conducted in England. On 17 March 2026 the Welsh Senedd voted to ban greyhound racing in Wales, and the following day, the Scottish Parliament voted in support of a Green Party bill to ban greyhound racing in Scotland.

The RGBB launched a legal challenge to the ban in Wales, which was rejected by the High Court.

== See also ==
- History of gambling in the United Kingdom
