= 1937 English Greyhound Derby =

- Location: White City Stadium
- Start date: 10 June
- End date: 26 June
- Total prize money: £1,250 (winner)

The 1937 Greyhound Derby took place during June with the final being held on 26 June 1937 at White City Stadium. The winner Wattle Bark owned by Mrs R H Dent, received a first prize of £1,250 and set a new national record when winning the final after recording 29.26 secs.

== Final result ==
At White City (over 525 yards):

Position	Name of Greyhound	Breeding	Trap	SP	Time	Trainer
1st	Wattle Bark	Secret Chance - Helena Kane	6	5-2	29.26*	Jim Syder Sr. (Wembley)
2nd	Shove Ha'penny	Town Treasure - Princess Karl	1	7-4f	29.38	Jack Harvey (Harringay)
3rd	Grosvenor Bob	Golden Hammer - Wonderful Expression	4	11-2	29.70	Jim Syder Sr. (Wembley)
4th	Maidens Delight	Maidens Boy - Springfield Sal	5	20-1	29.72	Jim Syder Sr. (Wembley)
5th	Avion Ballerino	Future Cutlet - Avion Beauty	2	10-1	29.74	Jerry Hannafin (Wimbledon)
6th	Top of the Carlow Road	Town Rattler - Clarenbridge	3	11-2	29.76	Sidney Orton (Wimbledon)

* National record & track record

=== Distances ===
1½, 4, head, head, head (lengths)
The distances between the greyhounds are in finishing order and shown in lengths. From 1927-1950 one length was equal to 0.06 of one second but race times are shown as 0.08 as per modern day calculations.

== Review ==
52 entries were nominated with 36 accepted for the 1937 Derby. Heading the list as ante-post favourite was the defending champion Fine Jubilee. Another strong contender was Shove Halfpenny trained by Jack Harvey; the fawn dog had won the first ever Pall Mall Stakes and held the track record equally with Fine Jubilee in addition to earning a runners up spot in the St Leger and reaching the Cesarewitch final. Laurels champion Top of the Carlow Road and recent Gold Collar champion Avion Ballerina were also considered two to watch.

On the opening night Wattle Bark won his first round heat in 29.77 from favourite Wise Carey, a race in which a greyhound called Lone Keel failed to progress. On a wet second night of heats a huge shock ensued when Fine Jubilee priced at 2-5f was eliminated after finding trouble and finishing last.

In the second round Wattle Bark broke the track record in a time of 29.36 beating Hexham Bridge by 7 lengths. Another impressive winner on the night in a time of 29.60 was the now former track record holder Shove Halfpenny.

Wattle Bark and Shove Halfpenny met in the first semi-final and which ended with Shove Halfpenny winning in 29.36 to equal the new track record set by his rival. Wattle Bark found trouble but ran on for the third qualifying place behind 1935 finalist Maidens Delight. Jesmond Cutlet went out at this stage, he had competed in the first two rounds under the name of Lewis of Waterhall before being sold and changing his name. The second semi-final was won by Top of the Carlow Road by a head from Grosvenor Bob with Avion Ballerino taking the final place. Wembley trainer Jim Syder Sr. had steered three hounds through to the final.

All six finalists were from London and Wattle Bark from trap six draw was fast from the traps and broke the track record once again by recording 29.26. Shove Halfpenny ran on for second place overtaking the fading Avion Ballerino, despite being impeded at the first bend.

== See also ==
1937 UK & Ireland Greyhound Racing Year
