= 1937 Irish Greyhound Derby =

- Venue: Shelbourne Park
- Location: Dublin
- End date: 31 July

The 1937 Irish Greyhound Derby took place during July with the final being held at Shelbourne Park in Dublin on 31 July.

The winner Muinessa was owned by Nuala O'Byrne.

== Final result ==
At Shelbourne Park, 31 July (over 525 yards):

Position	Name of Greyhound	Breeding	Trap	SP	Time	Trainer
1st	Muinessa	Slanebeg - Won But Lost	5	6-1	30.85	Nuala O’Byrne
2nd	Western Skipper	Mechanical Cut - Truthful Goddess	6	6-4f	31.01	Tom Black
3rd	Tee Bawn		2	5-2	31.07	J Kenny
4th	Sure Line		2	10-1		Graham
unplaced	Another Sunville		4	7-1		O’Callaghan
unplaced	Blackstream Bridge	Nora's Cutlet - Eagles Reel	3	5-1		Michael Sheehan

=== Distances ===
2, ¾

== Competition Report ==
In the final Muinessa came out top in a very competitive final with all greyhounds showing in the final. Blackstream Bridge, Tee Bawn and Western Skipper all vied for the lead until the third bend before the other three greyhounds Muinessa, Another Sunville and Sure Line all joined them. As the pack approached the fourth bend Western Skipper was marginally ahead before a decisive late burst of pace by Muinessa sealed the win.

Muinessa was bred by Simon Garrahan and owned by his niece Nuala O’Byrne and the final was a one-two finish for County Westmeath connections.

== See also ==
- 1937 UK & Ireland Greyhound Racing Year
