= 1937 UK & Ireland Greyhound Racing Year =

The 1937 UK & Ireland Greyhound Racing Year was the 12th year of greyhound racing in the United Kingdom and the 11th year of greyhound racing in Ireland.

== Roll of honour ==
Major Winners
Award	Name of Winner
1937 English Greyhound Derby	Wattle Bark
1937 Irish Greyhound Derby	Muinessa
1937 Scottish Greyhound Derby	Jesmond Cutlet
1937 Welsh Greyhound Derby	Genial Radiance

== Summary ==
The industry showed no sign of a slow down, with attendances at UK tracks surpassing twenty million for the sixth year in succession. The leading company, the Greyhound Racing Association (GRA) increased profits again. The operating profit for 1937 was £241,000 (a substantial figure at the time) and attendances at GRA tracks increased slightly to 3,849,513. The GRA also took a controlling interest in New Cross Stadium and boasted that they had the largest totalisator in the world at White City, with 634 issuing machines. Wattle Bark won the 1937 English Greyhound Derby defeating 1936 star Shove Halfpenny into second place.

== Tracks ==
Just five known tracks opened but Crayford & Bexleyheath Stadium underwent a significant £50,000 renovation, with no provision made for speedway.

=== Tracks opened ===
Date	Stadium/Track	Location
6 February	Bickington	Bickington, near Barnstaple, Devon
23 October	Holiday Park	Durham
26 August	Stanley Greyhound Stadium	Stanley, Durham
23 November	Redheugh Park	Gateshead
unknown	Markets Field	Limerick

== Competitions ==
London based trainers monopolised the main races and the names of Sidney Orton at Wimbledon, Jim Syder Sr. at Wembley, Stanley Biss at West Ham and the Hook kennels trainers Leslie Reynolds, Joe Harmon and Jack Harvey all became household names.

An attempt by Derby champion Fine Jubilee to win the Gold Collar failed as he was beaten three quarters in the final by Avion Ballerina. He had won his semi-final by breaking the track record, recording 25.42 and finishing eleven lengths clear of second placed Hetton Sea Eagle. Just six days later Oaks champion Genial Radiance now trained privately by J W Day was victorious in the Welsh Greyhound Derby. The Scurry Gold Cup was held in July with many of the Derby participants taking part at Clapton Stadium, in a very competitive final Hexham Bridge came out on top in a race that included Curleys Fancy II and Avion Ballerina. Hexham Bridge had remained unbeaten throughout the competition.

Jesmond Cutlet claimed the Scottish Greyhound Derby and Ballyhennessy Sandills won the Laurels. The two competitions clashed, as did the Oaks and St Leger in September; the calendar required better organisation. Brave Queen won the 1937 Oaks, a race that was a little shambolic following the withdrawal of three runners. A top class field assembled for the St Leger, a competition won by Grosvenor Bob, continuing a great year for trainer Jim Syder. Top of the Carlow Road and Maidens Delight finished fourth and fifth respectively in the final. Jesmond Cutlet completed a fine year by defeating great rival Grosvenor Bob in the Cesarewitch which was now held in December.

The White City invitation race was held on 6 November and carried a winner's prize of £2,000, remarkably £750 more than the Derby itself. Laurels champion Ballyhennessy Sandills took the honours. The second prize offered was £1,000 and went to Wily Captain and the previous year's winner Safe Rock picked up £500 for finishing third.

== Ireland ==
Markets Field in Limerick finally opened to greyhound racing following a long delay. Clonmel Greyhound Stadium record holder Monarch Of All was sold for the record price of 350 guineas at the Harold's Cross Stadium sales.

Muinessa won the 1937 Irish Greyhound Derby.

== News ==
Romford Greyhound Stadium owner Archer Leggett initiated a bizarre idea to introduce cheetah racing to the UK. Twelve cheetahs arrived from Kenya in December 1936 courtesy of explorer Kenneth Gandar-Dower. After six months of quarantine the cheetahs were given time to acclimatise before Romford, Harringay and Staines were earmarked for the experiment with the cheetahs running for the first time on Saturday 11 December 1937 at Romford. The experiment failed, with just one further race held; the racing stopped because although the cheetahs were able to better the greyhound times they had to be let off first when racing greyhounds and when they raced against each other they became disinterested and stopped chasing the lure.

Fourteen year old George Curtis secured a job with Portsmouth Stadium trainer Bill Peters.

== Principal UK races ==
Grand National, White City (May 22, 525y h, £300)
Pos	Name of Greyhound	Trainer	SP	Time	Trap
1st	Flying Wedge	Stanley Biss	1-1f	30.61	4
2nd	Border Mutton	Paddy McEllistrim	4-1	30.64	5
3rd	Lochiel Hero	Les Parry	7-2	30.78	2
4th	Markhams Brandy	Paddy McEllistrim	8-1	30.94	3
5th	Joyful Brandy	Jerry Hannafin	6-1	31.18	1

Gold Collar, Catford (May 29, 400y, £500)
Pos	Name of Greyhound	Trainer	SP	Time	Trap
1st	Avion Ballerina	Jerry Hannafin	6-1	25.87	1
2nd	Fine Jubilee	Marjorie Yate	4-11f	25.93	3
3rd	Stormtrooper	Arthur 'Doc' Callanan	50-1	26.41	5
4th	Hetton Sea Eagle	Jack Harvey	100-7	26.47	4
5th	Beckbury Miracle	Marjorie Yate	50-1	26.53	2
6th	Hexham Bridge	Bill Cowell	8-1	26.61	6

Welsh Derby, White City (Cardiff) (Jun 5, 525y, £115)
Pos	Name of Greyhound	Trainer	SP	Time	Trap
1st	Genial Radiance	J W Day	5-1	30.15	5
2nd	Wily Captain	Joe Harmon	1-1f	30.27	3
3rd	Little Puddin Basin	Stanley Biss	20-1	30.39	6
4th	Howling Rupert	Stanley Biss	20-1	30.63	2
5th	Wise Client II	Jim Syder Sr.	20-1	30.95	4
6th	Welcome Ways	Leslie Reynolds	20-1	30.99	1

Scurry Gold Cup, Clapton (Jul 24, 400y)
Pos	Name of Greyhound	Trainer	SP	Time	Trap
1st	Hexham Bridge	Bill Cowell	3-1	23.37	4
2nd	Orlucks Best	Charlie Ashley	7-4f	23.61	6
3rd	Curleys Fancy II	Jerry Hannafin	100-6	23.77	2
4th	Avion Ballerino	Jerry Hannafin	5-2	24.17	3
5th	Hetton Sea Eagle	Jack Harvey	7-1	24.21	5
6th	Last Hop	Harry Woolner	25-1	24.29	1

Scottish Greyhound Derby, Carntyne (Aug 14, 525y, £200)
Pos	Name of Greyhound	Trainer	SP	Time	Trap
1st	Jesmond Cutlet	Dal Hawkesley	9-4jf	29.83	6
2nd	Kinauld Demonstrator	Eddie Wright	10-1	29.89	4
3rd	Bright Dan	Patrick McKinney	9-4jf	30.29	5
4th	Hasty Reward		10-1	30.45	1
5th	Man Happy	Jim Syder Sr.	4-1	30.61	3
6th	Diamond Glory	Ronnie Melville	7-1	30.77	2

Laurels, Wimbledon (Aug 20, 500y, £600)
Pos	Name of Greyhound	Trainer	SP	Time	Trap
1st	Ballyhennessy Sandills	Sidney Orton	4-5f	28.25	4
2nd	Bealtaine	Joe Harmon	5-1	28.28	2
3rd	Wise Carey	Joe Harmon	10-1	28.48	5
4th	Wily Captain	Joe Harmon	20-1	28.49	1
5th	Brave Don	Leslie Reynolds	50-1	28.99	3
6th	Fine Jubilee	Marjorie Yate	3-1	29.07	6

Oaks, White City (Sep 11, 525y, £300)
Pos	Name of Greyhound	Trainer	SP	Time	Trap
1st	Brave Queen	Stanley Biss	4-9f	29.62	2
2nd	Beckbury Moth	Marjorie Yate	9-4	29.78	4
3rd	Mallerts Orphan	Bowles	100-8	30.10	5
N/R	Hetties Biddy	Leslie Reynolds			
N/R	My Beauty	Sid Mann			
N/R	Nautch Girl	Leslie Reynolds			

St Leger, Wembley (Sep 20, 700y, £500)
Pos	Name of Greyhound	Trainer	SP	Time	Trap
1st	Grosvenor Bob	Jim Syder Sr.	1-2f	41.13	4
2nd	Sheehan	Joe Harmon	7-2	41.19	1
3rd	Grosvenor Edwin	Jim Syder Sr.	10-1	41.22	3
4th	Top of the Carlow Road	Sidney Orton	7-1	41.46	2
5th	Maidens Delight	Jim Syder Sr.	20-1	41.50	6
6th	Golden Staff	Johnny Bullock	25-1	41.54	5

The White City White City (Nov 6, 500y, £2,000)
Pos	Name of Greyhound	Trainer	SP	Time	Trap
1st	Ballyhennessy Sandills	Sidney Orton	9-4jf	28.39	1
2nd	Wily Captain	Joe Harmon	9-4jf	28.59	6
3rd	Safe Rock	Fred Wilson	33-1	28.67	2
4th	Junior Classic	Joe Harmon	6-1	28.91	5
5th	Fine Jubilee	Marjorie Yate	3-1	29.07	4

Cesarewitch, West Ham (Dec 18, 600y, £600)
Pos	Name of Greyhound	Trainer	SP	Time	Trap
1st	Jesmond Cutlet	Dal Hawkesley	11-4	34.56	5
2nd	Grosvenor Bob	Jim Syder Sr.	5-2f	34.88	1
3rd	On the Strait	Sidney Orton	11-4	35.04	6
4th	Kinauld Demonstrator	Eddie Wright	25-1	35.52	2
5th	Wise Carey	Joe Harmon	25-1	36.24	4
6th	Neville the Devil	Leslie Reynolds	3-1	36.40	3
