= Handicap (greyhound racing) =

A handicap race in greyhound racing is a race in which greyhounds are allocated different starting traps by the Racing Manager. The purpose of doing so is to enable greyhounds of various ability to compete in the same race by virtue of allowing the slower greyhounds to start in front of the faster greyhounds.

The practice is used primarily in graded racing because of the varying abilities of the graded greyhounds. It is generally more popular in Scotland and some North of England tracks but is rarely seen in the South of England and Ireland.

The allocation under Rule 65 (g) of the Rules of Racing states "that a greyhound allocated the scratch position (the fastest greyhound/s) shall start from a starting trap at the normal starting position for the nominal distance of the Race, and any greyhounds allotted a handicap (the slower greyhound/s who receive some metres) shall start from a starting trap placed the relevant number of metres in front of such normal starting position; all starting traps to open simultaneously".

== See also ==
- Greyhound racing in the United Kingdom
- Greyhound racing in Ireland
