= Thornton Stadium =

Scottish greyhound track

- Interactive map of Thornton Stadium
- Location: Thornton, Kirkcaldy, Fife, Scotland KY1 4DA
- Coordinates: 56°9′34″N 3°8′26″W

Construction
- Opened: 1936
- Closed: 2025

Website
- https://thorntondogs.wixsite.com/racing

Thornton Stadium was a greyhound racing track in Thornton, Kirkcaldy, Fife, Scotland. The track was the last remaining independent track and was not regulated by the Greyhound Board of Great Britain. Racing took place on Saturdays at 7.30pm.

== Location ==
The stadium is between Kirkcaldy and Glenrothes is the village of Thornton, and Thornton Stadium is located on a road known as Ore Mill, off Main Street, and is situated near the A92.

== History ==
The first race was held on 29 May 1936, and the circuit is described as a good galloping track. In 1977, Ricky Grant took ownership of the track and added floodlights and refurbished the site. He put the six acre stadium on the market in April 1998, asking £200,000 for it.

Races are held over 100, 300, 500, and 680 yards (mainly handicaps). It is the only independent (not affiliated to a governing body) track remaining today, with racing taking place on most Saturdays at 7:30 p.m.

Racing operations were suspended indefinitely in March 2025, leaving the future of the stadium uncertain.

== Track records ==
At closing

| Yards | Greyhound | Time | Date |
|---|---|---|---|
| 100 | Bubba | 5.92 | 7 July 2018 |
| 300 | Fire | 16.11 | 3 May 2008 |
| 500 | Balamory | 27.10 | 3 July 2004 |
| 500 | Easy Blue | 27.10 | 3 May 2008 |
| 680 | Lucy | 38.98 | 21 April 2007 |
| 680 | Morgan | 38.98 | 2 May 2009 |
