= Perry Barr Stadium =

Former sports venue

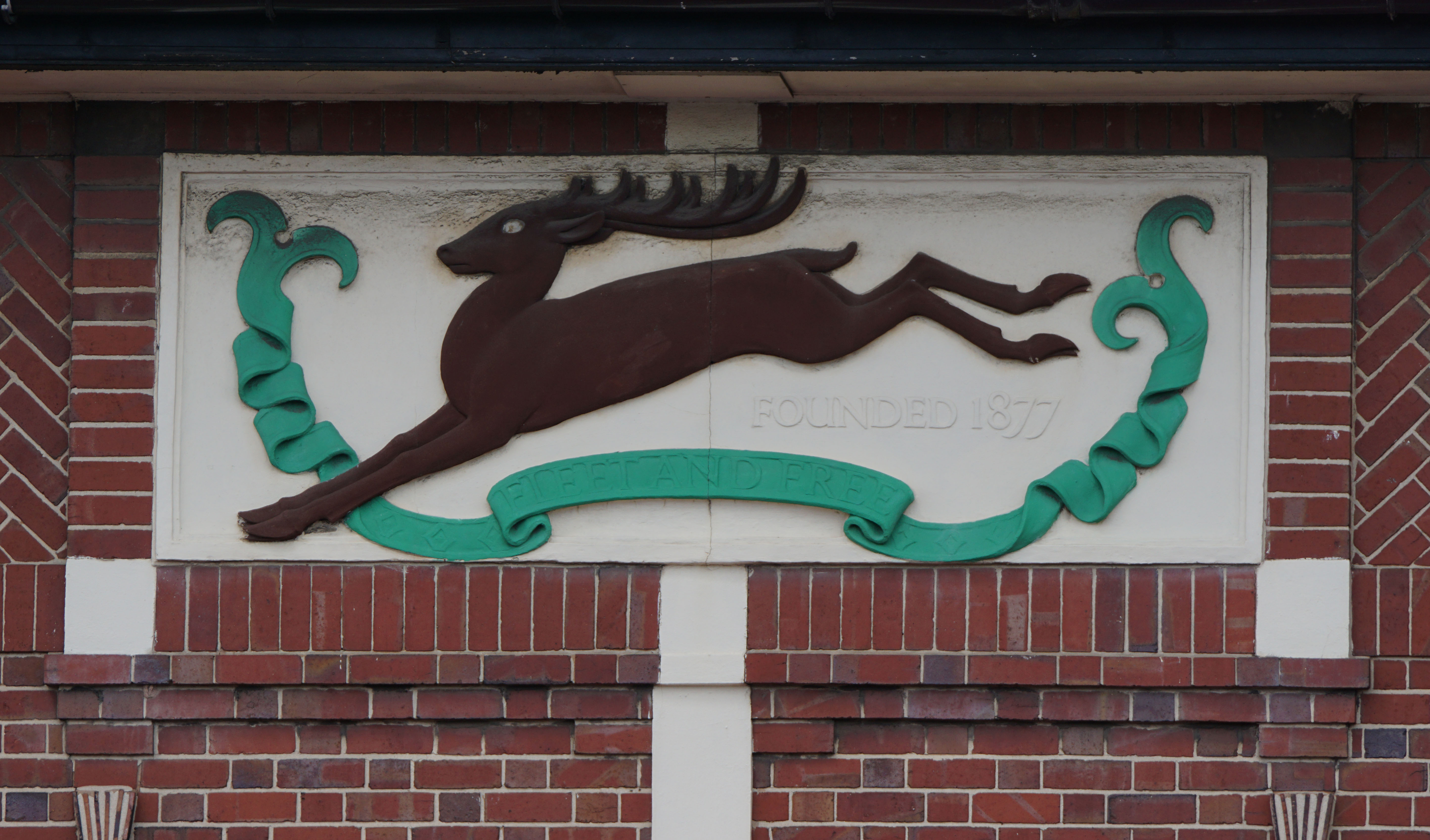
- Interactive map of Perry Barr Stadium
- Full name: Perry Barr Greyhound Stadium
- Former names: Alexander Sports Ground
- Location: Aldridge Road, Perry Barr, Birmingham, England
- Coordinates: 52.5196°N 1.8988°W
- Owner: National Asset Management Agency

Construction
- Opened: 27 July 1929
- Expanded: 2007
- Closed: 2025
- Demolished: 2025

Tenants
- Birmingham Brummies (2007–2025); Greyhound racing (1984–2025); Birchfield Harriers (1929–1977)

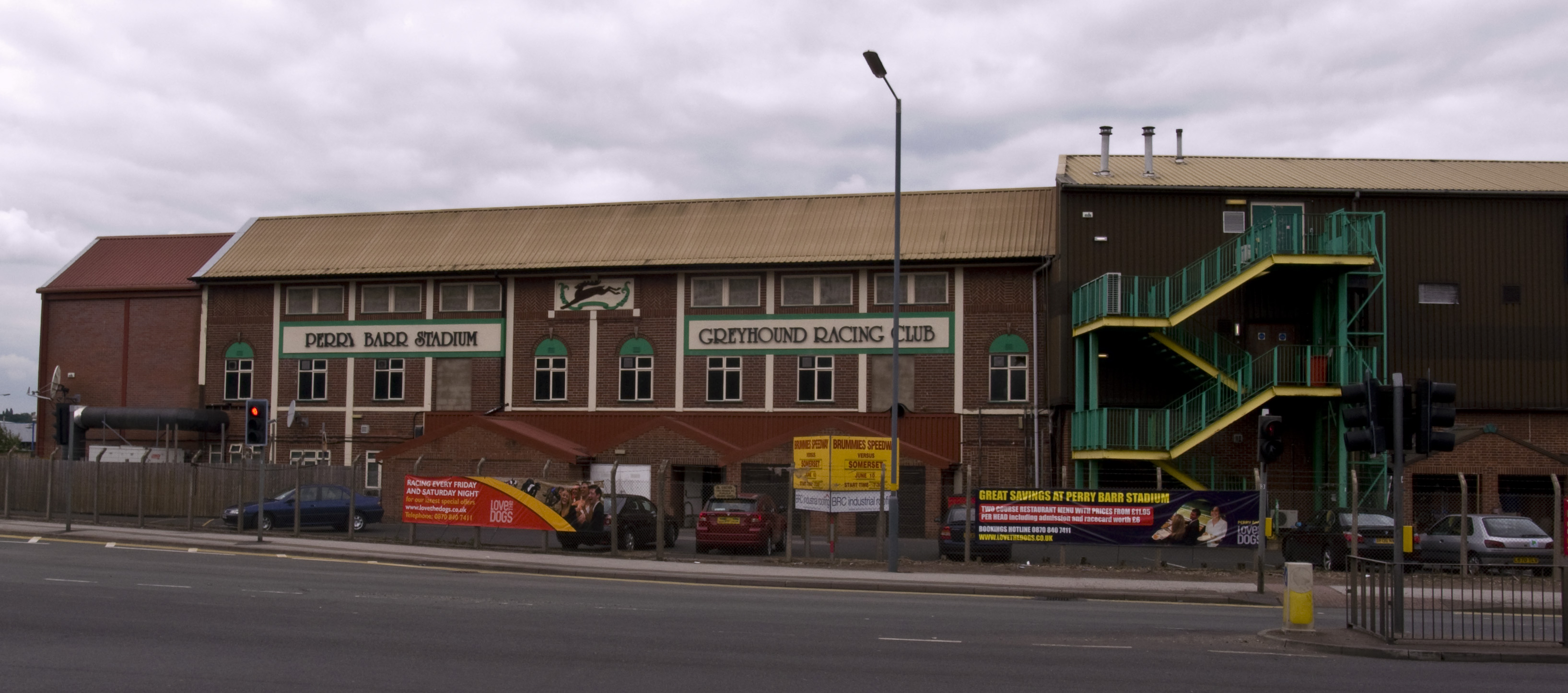
Stadium from Aldridge Road, in 2009. There are extensions to either side of the original block.

Perry Barr Stadium (also known as Perry Barr Greyhound Stadium and previously as Alexander Sports Ground(s)) was a greyhound racing and motorcycle speedway stadium on Aldridge Road in Perry Barr, Birmingham, England. It is not to be confused with the Birchfield Ladbroke Stadium that is known as the old Perry Barr Stadium which closed in 1984. The track was operated by various greyhound companies, the last being the Arena Racing Company (ARC), who leased it from owners the National Asset Management Agency. Racing took place every Saturday evening, in addition to their afternoon fixtures.

Opened in 1929, it was built for Birchfield Harriers, who left in 1977. It was then used for greyhound racing and speedway.

In 2025, the greyhound racing and speedway ceased as the lease expiry approached, with the entire greyhound racing operation being transferred to the new Dunstall Park Greyhound Stadium but the speedway being left without a home. In October 2025, the stadium was demolished.

== Location ==
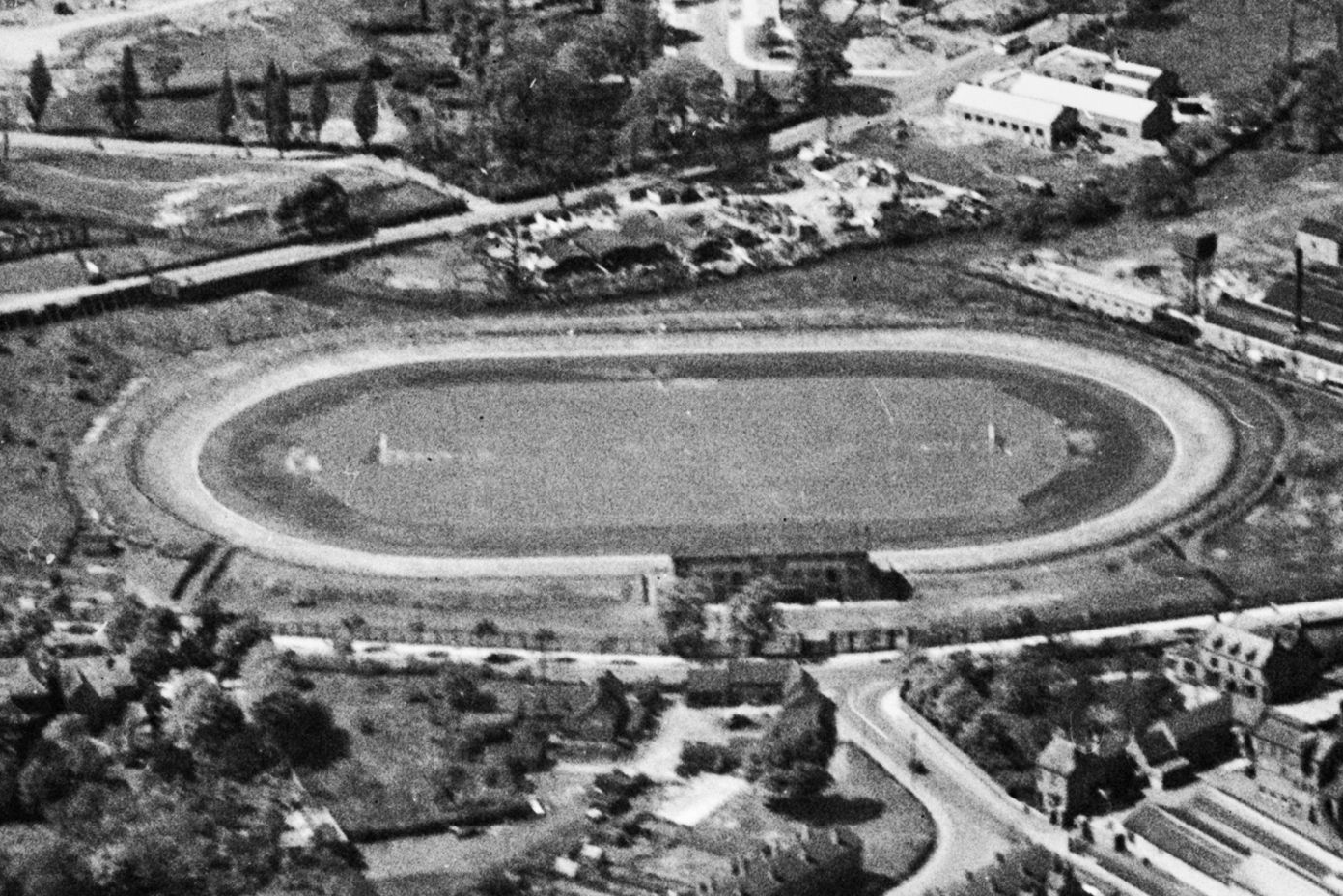
Perry Barr Stadium from the south-east, 1937

The stadium was opposite the former Birmingham City University main campus and close to (and served by) Perry Barr railway station. It sat in the fork of the A34 Walsall Road (to its West) and the A453 Aldridge Road. The River Tame flows northwards between the site and the A34.

== Birchfield Harriers ==
The stadium was originally constructed for an athletics club, Birchfield Harriers who held its opening ceremony on 27 July 1929, having purchased the land on 11 November 1926. The façade carried their badge, a running stag, rendered in Art Deco style bas relief, carved in 1929 and attributed to William Bloye. The site was formerly a rubbish tip, chiefly for fly ash from a local power station.

Birchfield Cycling Club used the venue for cycle races, and, from the mid-1930s, the cycle track outside the running lanes was used by the Sunbac Speedway Club for dirt-track racing (speedway). In the 1930s and 40s, Aston Villa Football Club's second and third teams trained at the stadium.

Soon after the start of World War II, the stadium was requisitioned by the government and used by the Home Guard. Later in the war it was used to accommodate Italian prisoners of war; the last of these did not leave until January 1946 and the club only returned to the stadium the following month. Shortly afterwards, the club hired out the stadium on Saturday evenings, to Birmingham Speedway. Floodlighting was installed to facilitate the latter, and this allowed for the first floodlit athletics meeting ever held in the United Kingdom, in September 1948, after the lights had been turned on near the end of an earlier meeting, which had overrun into dusk. Floodlit horse jumping competitions were also held.

On 29 May 1954 Diane Leather became the first woman to run a mile in less than 5 minutes, during the Midlands Women's AAA Championships at the ground.

In 1977, their centenary year, Birchfield Harriers moved to the newly built Alexander Stadium, nearby, and the old venue was renamed "Perry Barr Stadium".

== Speedway ==
The stadium was the home of the Birmingham Brummies speedway team. The stadium was expanded in 2007 to facilitate a speedway track. The shale track was 292 metres (319 yards) in length.

== Greyhound Racing ==
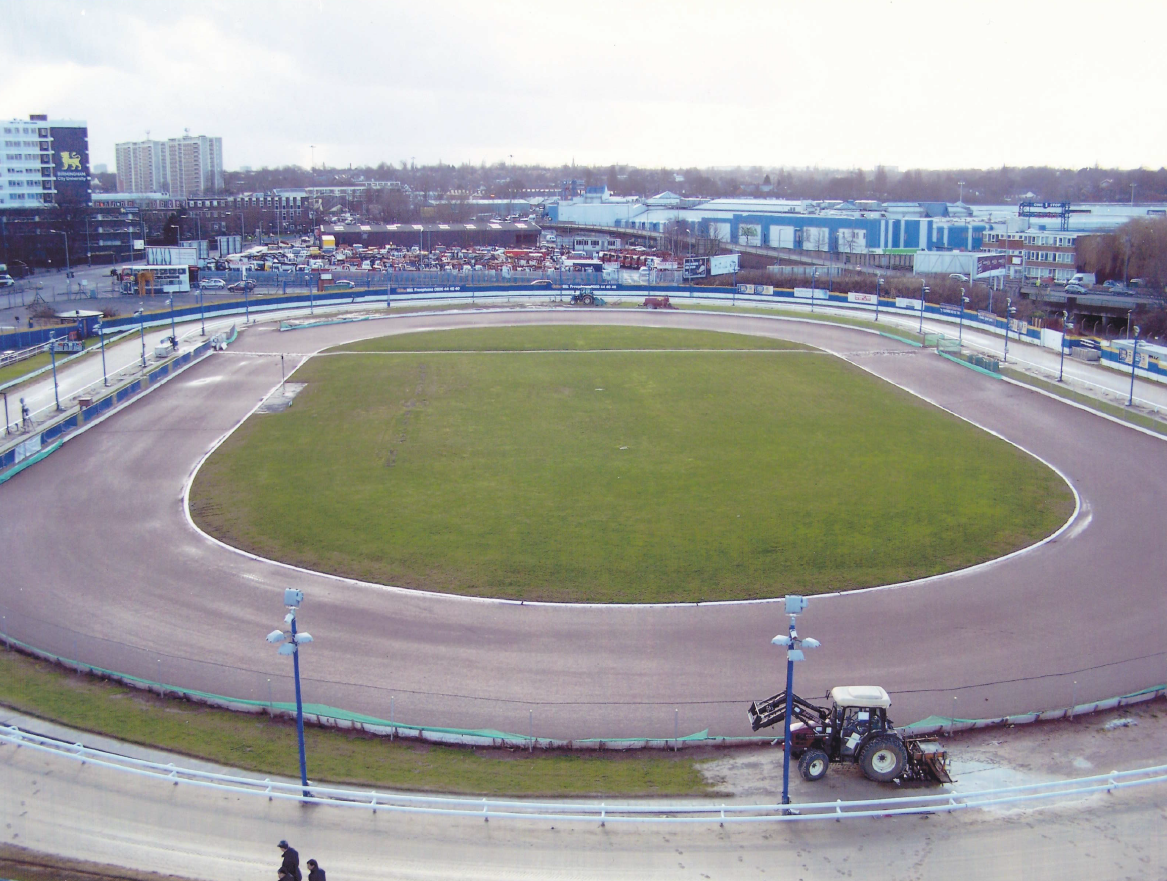
Perry Barr Aldridge Road c.2007

=== Origins and opening ===
Perry Barr had been without greyhound racing since 1984 following the surprise sale by Ladbrokes and subsequent demolition of the old Perry Barr stadium on Walsall Road, and known latterly as the Birchfield Ladbroke Stadium. However during 1990 negotiations started with the aim to re-introduce the sport at the Alexander Sports Ground across the other side of the A34. The stadium was no longer used for athletics because the new Alexander Stadium Stadium in Perry Park was serving this purpose. Maurice Buckland a former trainer and head of a consortium called the Perry Barr Greyhound Racing Club suggested the idea of greyhound racing at the venue it was given planning permission.

The new build was completed quickly and the new stadium opened on 16 October attracting trainers the calibre of Geoff DeMulder who guided Fearless Mustang to the 1991 English Greyhound Derby final as a Perry Barr trainer during the first Derby tilt for the new track.

The circumference of the track was 435 metres with wide straights and bends and race distances of 275, 460, 500, 660, 710 and 895 metres. An 'Outside Sumner' hare was used on Tuesday and Thursday race nights overseen by Racing Manager Gary Woodward. There were kennels for 82 hounds on site. A former trainer from the previous Perry Barr called Frank Baldwin took over as Racing Manager in 1991.

=== Recent history and GRA takeover ===
A major race called the Birmingham Cup was held at Perry Barr until 2009 and it also hosted the original classic race the Scurry Gold Cup from 2005 to 2008. Another Perry Barr hound called Heres Seanie (trained by Pat Ryan) reached the 1995 English Greyhound Derby final and Racing Managers included Ian Hillis and Tim Hales.

The Greyhound Racing Association (GRA) under their parent company Wembley plc planned to build a track in Liverpool and acquire Perry Barr. The former did not materialise but in May 2005 a £4.2 million takeover was agreed with the Perry Barr Greyhound Racing Club. Stephen Rea and Gary Woodward were brought in as the General and Racing Manager. After initial investment into the stadium the GRA brought the former classic race the Scurry Gold Cup to the track following the closure of Catford Stadium. The stadium hosted two trainers championships in 2005 and 2012 and inbetween the Scurry was moved to sister track Belle Vue Stadium but the rekindled Birmingham Cup was discontinued in 2009 leaving Perry Barr with no major event of note.

The track used an 'Outside Swaffham' hare and was a regular on the Bookmakers Afternoon Greyhound Service (BAGS) overseen by Racing Manager Martin Seal.

The GRA, under new parent company Risk Capital, ran into financial difficulties and unpaid loans resulted in NAMA (Ireland's National Asset Management Agency) taking control of the GRA. In 2013 an agreement was brokered securing the use of the stadium by the GRA until at least 2026 from parent company NAMA.

In 2017 the stadium was awarded the prestigious St Leger after it switched from sister track Wimbledon. One year later in 2018 the stadium signed a deal with ARC to race on Monday, Thursday and Saturday lunchtimes and Sunday afternoon.

=== ARC takeover ===
In October 2019 GRA Acquisition sold the lease to the Arena Racing Company

In 2021 the stadium was given the prestigious Laurels and Oaks, resulting in the track holding four of the original classic races, the St Leger, Laurels, Oaks and Scurry Gold Cup. In 2022, the stadium owners ARC signed a long term deal with Entain for media rights, starting in January 2024.

== Closure ==
With the greyhound racing and speedway lease due to expire in 2026, plans were submitted by the Corbally Group, a West Midlands developer to build more than 400 homes on the site. Plans to move the greyhound operation to Dunstall Park Greyhound Stadium in Wolverhampton began with the St Leger being moved to Nottingham and the Oaks to Dunstall Park at the Wolverhampton Racecourse. The operation moved during late August 2025. The last greyhound meeting was held on 23 August and the last speedway meeting on 25 August.

In October 2025, the stadium was demolished, despite the necessary planning permission for this not having been obtained.

== Track records ==
=== Final at closing ===
Metres	Greyhound	Time (sec)	Date	Notes/ref
275	Rioja Oisin	15.71	19 October 2024	Scurry Gold Cup semi final
480	Coolavanny Shado	27.77	27 October 2022	
660	Newinn This Way	39.55	31 July 2015	
710	Droopys Clue	42.33	23 September 2023	St Leger final
915	Aayamza Royale	56.42	30 September 2021	

=== Former ===
Extended content

Metres	Greyhound	Time (sec)	Date	Notes/ref
275	Carrigeen Zig	16.66	30 April 1991	=equalled
275	Blissful Piper	16.61	4 June 1991	
275	Motown Way	16.61	29 June 1991	=equalled
275	Ancient Heart	16.40	2002	
275	Meadowbank Paolo	16.34	5 October 2003	
275	Pennys Saga	16.29	1 July 2004	
275	Giglis Roanokee	16.24	22 July 2004	
275	Giglis Roanokee	16.22	5 August 2004	
275	Ningbo Jack	16.05	9 August 2005	
275	Laser Beam	16.06	2 August 2005	Scurry Gold Cup Final
275	Roxholme Freddie	16.04	18 August 2006	
275	Horseshoe Ping	15.81	17 May 2007	Scurry Gold Cup final
275	Gougane Jet	15.80	27 October 2022	Scurry Gold Cup final
460	Torbal Ash	27.97	13 November 1990	
460	Velvet Spark	27.67	1 August 1994	
480	Derbay Flyer	28.80	25 September 1999	
480	Burberry Boy	28.45	2 April 2003	Birmingham Cup semi-finals
480	Westview Lad	28.31	17 July 2004	
480	Bat On	28.18	13 April 2006	
480	Raging Jack	28.13	28 December 2006	
480	Zigzag Dutchman	28.13	23 January 2007	
480	Blonde Dino	28.07	19 June 2008	
480	Sawpit Sensation	28.07	15 December 2011	
480	Taylors Sky	28.07	21 March 2012	
480	Judicial Review	27.96	31 July 2015	
480	Drumkeen Oyster	27.93	25 September 2015	
480	Slick Sakina	27.85	27 October 2022	Oaks final
500	Westmead Spirit	30.03	10 September 1991	
500	Toms Lodge	29.94	25 September 1993	
660	Crown Lodge	41.17	14 November 1991	
660	Lavally Pete	40.90	1 February 1999	
660	Cuba	40.88	27 October 2001	
660	Drumskea Beauty	40.69	5 October 2003	
660	Drum Shane Boy	40.54	10 June 2004	
660	Skipping Lady	40.44	1 July 2004	
660	Dark Charm	40.16	22 July 2004	
660	Jack Spark	39.98	9 April 2005	
660	Head Iton Paddy	39.93	31 July 2008	
660	Ballymac Sandra	39.88	3 August 2012	
660	Droopys Lucinda	39.84	22 May 2015	
710	Dark Luke	44.48	14 May 1991	
710	Head For Glory	44.13	14 October 1999	
710	Double Take	43.21	05 October 2003	
710	Swift Jade	43.01	23 January 2007	
710	Swift Ninja	42.97	24 January 2008	
710	Chaotic Dotty	42.94	1 May 2015	
710	Rubys Rascal	42.69	14 October 2017	
710	Space Jet	42.59	30 September 2021	St Leger final
895	Shropshire Lass	57.19	6 July 1991	
895	Spenwood Wizard	56.97	4 September 2000	
915	Head Iton Jordan	56.75	9 August 2007	
915	Savana Volcano	56.50	22 April 2021	
480 H	Trojan Flight	28.91	24 March 2005	
480 H	Druids Mickey Jo	28.88	2 August 2005	
480 H	Taipan	28.75	23 January 2007	
660 H	Olives Champ	41.22	26 March 1991	
660 H	Selby Ben	41.73	18 January 2005	
