= Oaks (English greyhound race) =

British greyhound racing competition

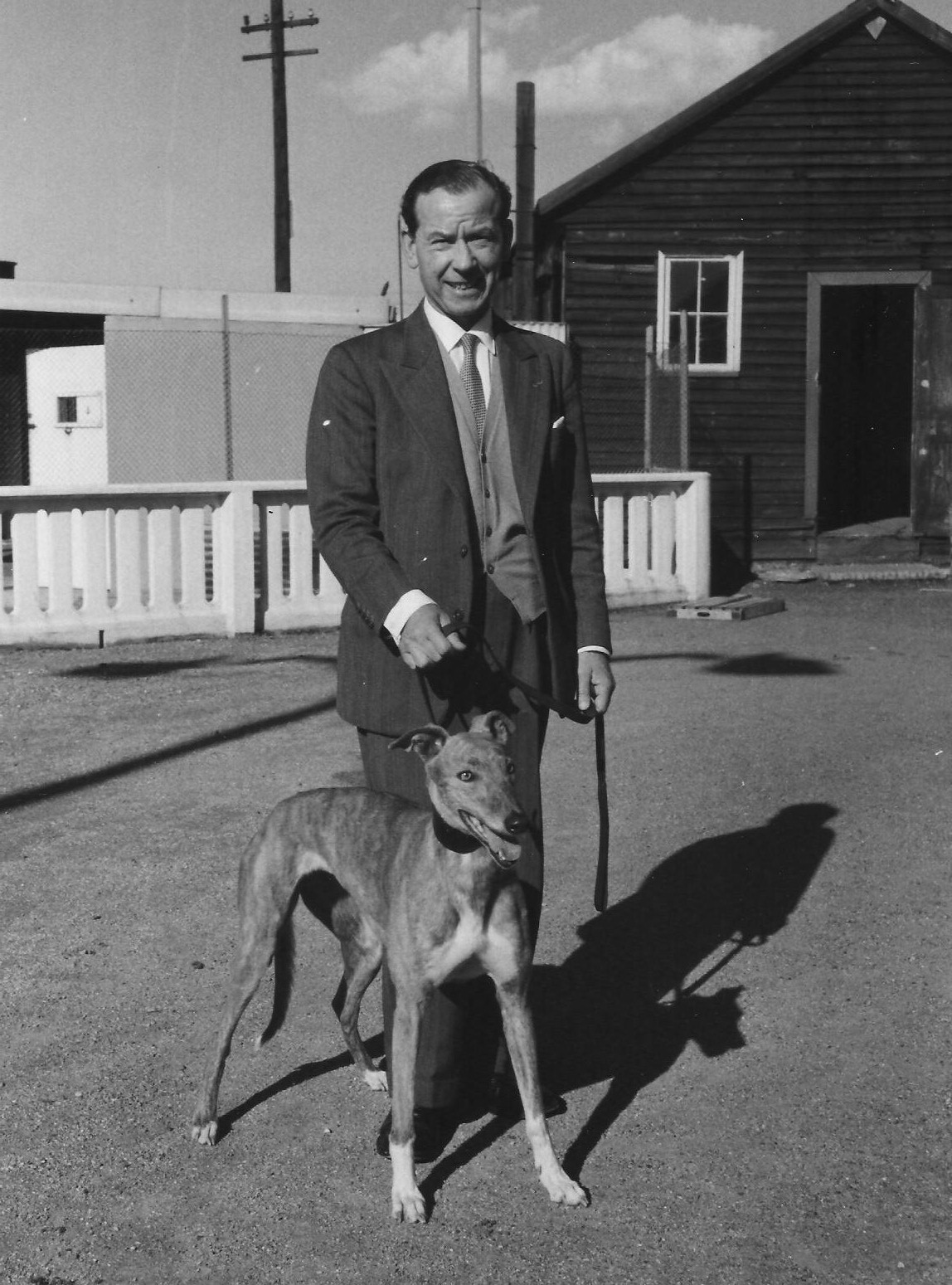
- 1959 winner Gurteen Scamp
- Class: Group 1 and Original Classic
- Location: Dunstall Park
- Inaugurated: 1927
- Sponsor: Premier Greyhound Racing

Race information
- Distance: 480 metres
- Surface: Sand
- Qualification: Bitches only
- Purse: £20,000 (winner)

The Oaks is an original classic greyhound racing competition held at Dunstall Park Greyhound Stadium.

== History ==
It was first run at White City Stadium from 1927 until 1958, and gained classic status in September 1939, becoming the seventh classic race but due to the war it was suspended until 1945. The race was held at Harringay Stadium from 1959 until 1987 and then to Wimbledon Stadium in 1988 until 2012.

In 2013 the Greyhound Racing Association (GRA) decided to move the event to sister track Belle Vue Stadium and just five years later, during 2018, it switched to Towcester following the decision by GRA to reduce their major race schedule. A sixth change of venue was necessary in 2018 following the sudden closure of Towcester, leading owner John Turner stepped in to save the event with a late scheduling being organised in December at Abbey Stadium.

In 2021, the race was switched from Swindon to Perry Barr due to the ongoing saga surrounding Swindon's redevelopment. The event stayed at Perry Barr and with the introduction of new sponsors in the form of Premier Greyhound Racing the prize money pot was increased significantly for the 2022 edition.

Since 2025 the event has been held at Dunstall Park Greyhound Stadium in Wolverhampton.

== Venues and distances ==
- 1927–1927 (White City, 500 y)
- 1928–1958 (White City, 525 y)
- 1959–1974 (Harringay, 525 y)
- 1975–1987 (Harringay, 475 m)
- 1988–2012 (Wimbledon, 480 m)
- 2013–2017 (Belle Vue, 470 m)
- 2018–2018 (Swindon, 480 m)
- 2019–2020 (Swindon, 476 m)
- 2021–2024 (Perry Barr, 480 m)
- 2025–2025 (Dunstall Park, 480 m)

== Sponsors ==
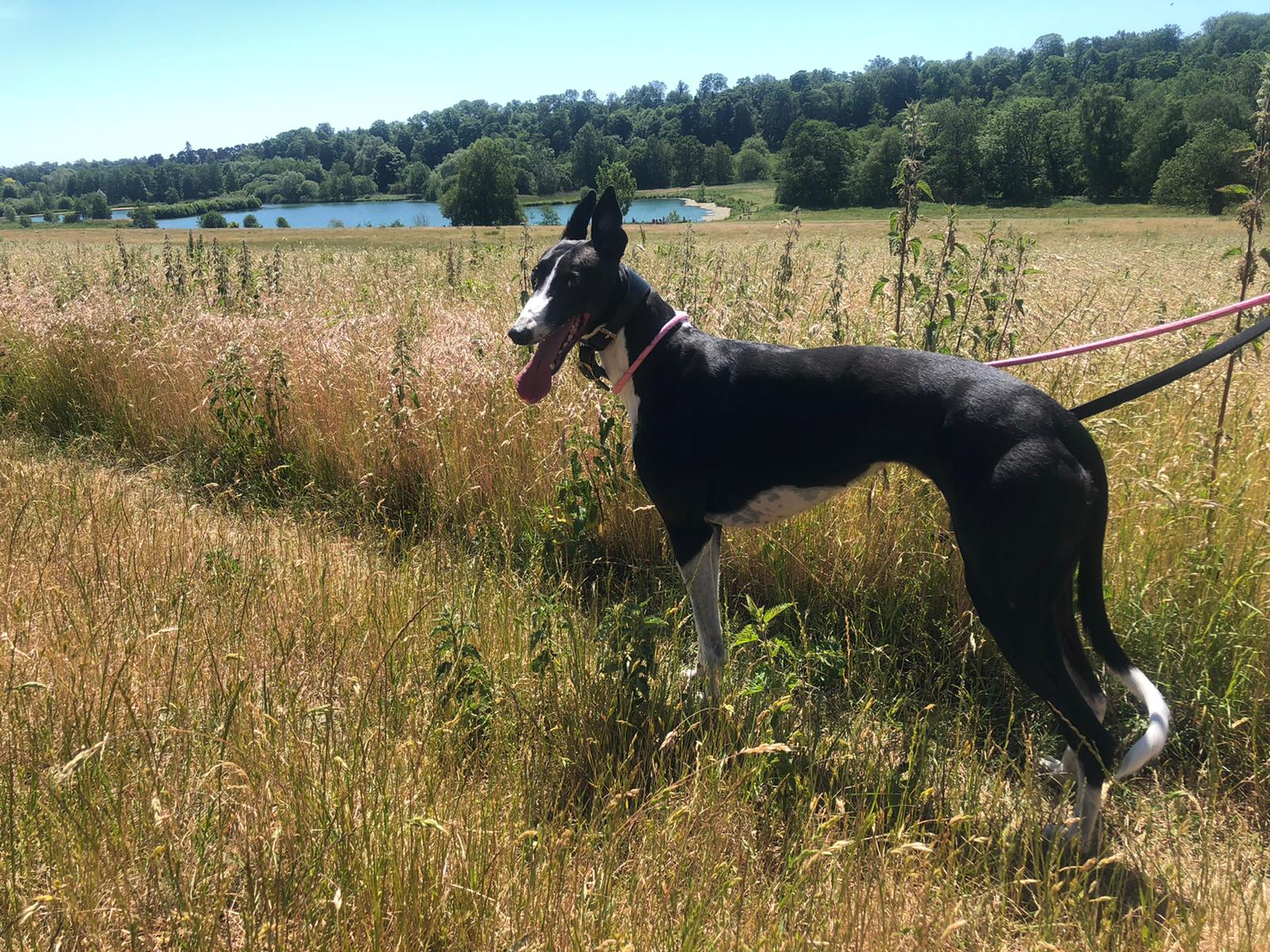
Ravenswood Flo, 2018 winner

- 1994–1994 (St Mary's Hospital, London)
- 2005–2014 (William Hill Bookmakers)
- 2015–2015 (ECC Timber)
- 2016–2016 (Racing Post GTV)
- 2017–2017 (Greyhound Media Group)
- 2018–2018 (John Turner)
- 2020–2020 (Property 192)
- 2021–2021 (Arena Racing Company)
- 2022–2025 (Premier Greyhound Racing)

== Winners ==
Year	Winner	Breeding	Trainer	Time (sec)	SP	Notes/ref
1927	Three of Spades	Mutts Brother - Elnora	Sid Jennings (Harringay)	29.96	5/1	
1928	Moselle	Lax Law - Fly Again	Jimmy Quinn (Private)	30.50	1/2f	
1929	Bewitching Eve	Beaded Rock - Oriental Action	Richard Cooper (Clapton)	30.33	3/1	
1930	Faithful Kitty	Mutton Cutlet - Old Bridge Lass	Stan Biss (West Ham)	30.02	4/6f	
1931	Drizzle	De Novo - Edna Best	Harry Woolner (White City)	30.00	4/6f	
1932	Queen of the Suir	Mutton Cutlet - Burette	Stan Biss (West Ham)	30.89	9/4	
1933	Queen of the Suir	Mutton Cutlet - Burette	Stan Biss (West Ham)	30.23	2/5f	
1934	Gallant Ruth	Mick the Miller - Melksham Damsel	Harry Buck (Harringay)	30.22	10/11f	
1935	Kitshine	Macoma - Pleasant Note	Arthur'Doc'Callanan (Wembley)	30.12	11/2	
1936	Genial Radiance	Johnny Peters - Reymerston	Austin Hiscock (Belle Vue)	29.86	4/6f	
1937	Brave Queen	Deemster - Burette	Stan Biss (West Ham)	29.62	4/9f	
1938	Quarter Day	Lawyers Fee - House Keeper	Joe Harmon (Wimbledon)	29.49	4/5f	
1945	Prancing Kitty	Tanist - Be Careful Kitty	Paddy Fortune (Wimbledon)	29.54	13/8	
1946	Dumbles Maid	Toward Point - Flash And Flare	Stan Biss (Clapton)	29.42	13/8	
1947	Rio Cepretta	Flying Dart - Rio Czarina	Stan Biss (Clapton)	29.32	6/5f	
1948	Night Breeze	Mad Tanist - Charity Maid	Stan Biss (Clapton)	29.19	4/1	
1949	Still Drifting	Shannon Shore - Bilting Antointette	Sidney Probert (Wembley)	29.48	11/2	
1950	Caledonian Faith	Train - Caledonian Desire	Arthur Mountfield (Private)	29.62	8/1	
1951	Ballinasloe Mona	Rimmells Black - Girlie O'Connor	Jack Harvey (Wembley)	29.28	6/4f	
1952	Flos Pet	Terrible Rebel - Drapers Assistant	Paddy Fortune (Wimbledon)	29.60	8/1	dead-heat
1952	Monachdy Girlie	Local Interprize - Golden Gleam	Jimmy Jowett (Clapton)	29.60	10/1	dead-heat
1953	Lizette	Master Captain - Dorothy Ann	Paddy Fortune (Wimbledon)	29.18	6/4f	
1954	Ashcott Winsome	Chittering Choice - Winsome Complexion	Bert Heyes (White City)	29.39	100/6	
1955	Lizette	Master Captain - Dorothy Ann	Jack Harvey (Wembley)	29.52	6/4	
1956	First But Last	Cheerful Chariot - Here At Last	Jack Harvey (Wembley)	29.08	2/7f	
1957	Dark Rose	Polonius - Exhibitionist	W.G.Brown (Private)	29.02	4/6f	
1958	Antarctica	Fire Prince - Spitland Joy	Jimmy Jowett (Clapton)	29.12	7/2	
1959	Gurteen Scamp	Hi There – Dunmore Claudia	George Waterman (Wimbledon)	29.90	11/2	
1960	Wheatfield Countess	Hi There - Wheatfield Satellite	Stan Martin (Wimbledon)	29.33	5/4f	
1961	Ballinasloe Blondie	Northern King - Ballinasloe Chicken	Jack Harvey (Wembley)	29.58	2/7f	
1962	Ballinasloe Blondie	Northern King - Ballinasloe Chicken	Jack Harvey (Wembley)	29.68	1/2f	
1963	Cranog Bet	Knock Hill Chieftain - Don't Bet	Phil Rees Sr. (Private)	29.31	7/2	
1964	Cranog Bet	Knock Hill Chieftain - Don't Bet	Phil Rees Sr. (Private)	29.02	4/9f	equalled track record
1965	Marjone	Crazy Parachute - Anjone	Mick O'Toole (Ireland)	29.37	4/1	
1966	Merry Emblem	Printers Prince - One For The Major	Matt Bruton (Ireland)	29.58	7/4	
1967	Solerina	Crazy Parachute - Primrose Princess	Janice Thistleton (Catford)	29.50	12/1	
1968	Shady Parachute	Crazy Parachute - Shady Contempora	Phil Rees Sr. (Wimbledon)	29.38	1/2f	
1969	Shady Bracelet	Printers Prince - Shady Crocus	Peter Collett (Private)	28.63	7/4f	
1970	Perth Pat	Maryville Hi - Hiver Swanky	Jim Morgan (Oxford)	28.81	13/8f	
1971	Short Cake	The Grand Silver - She Is Landing	David Geggus (Walthamstow)	28.98	5/1	
1972	Decimal Queen	Dusty Trail - Roamin Beauty	Mick Hawkins (Private)	28.60	6/4f	
1973	Miss Ross	Myross Again - Rich Life	Tom Johnston Jr. (Wembley)	28.63	8/1	
1974	Lady Devine	Supreme Fun - Funny Flash	Sid Ryall (Wembley)	28.76	3/1	
1975	Pineapple Grand	The Grand Silver - Pineapple Baby	Frank Baldwin (Perry Barr)	28.85	8/11f	
1976	Ballinderry Moth	Kilbelin Style - Skipping Chick	Barney O'Connor (Walthamstow)	28.60	4/6f	
1977	Switch Off	Westpark Mint - Kudas Pinch	Jim Singleton (Harringay)	28.69	6/4f	
1978	Kilmagoura Mist	Yanka Boy - Kilmagoura Fair	Tom Johnston Jr. (Wembley)	28.55	10/1	
1979	Sunny Interval	Itsachampion - Cloheadon Pussy	Philip Rees Jr. (Wimbledon)	28.77	12/1	
1980	Devilish Dolores	Itsachampion - Dancing Dolores	Ernie Gaskin Sr. (Private)	28.72	20/1	
1981	Thanet Princess	Instant Gambler - Isle Of Thanet	Dick Hawkes (Walthamstow)	28.82	11/2	
1982	Duchess of Avon	Ballintee Star - Quarry Blaze	Adam Jackson (Wembley)	28.72	1/1f	
1983	Major Grove	Knockrour Tiger - Sandras Melody	Eric Pateman (Wimbledon)	28.59	6/1	
1984	Sandy Sally	Sand Man - Ballyderg Moth	Jack Coker (Milton Keynes)	28.69	9/2	
1985	Spiral Super	Cooladine Super - Spiral Mint	George Curtis (Brighton)	28.57	10/11f	
1986	Sullane Princess	Oran Jack - Muileann Amere	Peter Payne (Romford)	28.79	20/1	
1987	Lucky Empress	Citizen Supreme - Dark Empress	Allen Briggs (Private)	28.43	2/1	
1988	Wendys Dream	Tamarac - Up Town Girl	Tommy Foster (Wimbledon)	28.81	4/5f	
1989	Nice and Lovely	Plunket Tim - Luisa Daniella	Derek Tidswell (Private)	29.02	9/4	
1990	Liberal Girl	Easy And Slow - Ballinvard Rose	Derek Knight (Brighton)	28.95	5/1	
1991	Simple Trend	Moral Support - Woodside Breeze	Ernie Gaskin Sr. (Walthamstow)	29.06	2/1f	
1992	Skelligs Smurf	Skelligs Tiger - Speedy Smurf	Bob Gilling (Reading)	29.71	11/8f	
1993	Pearls Girl	Flashy Sir - Desert Pearl	Sam Sykes (Wimbledon)	28.55	8/11f	
1994	Westmead Chick	I'm Slippy - Westmead Move	Nick Savva (Walthamstow)	28.60	8/11f	
1995	Saddlers Return	April Trio - Velvet Coat	Ernie Gaskin Sr. (Walthamstow)	28.76	3/1	
1996	Annies Bullet	Slippys Quest - O'Hickey Kylie	Nick Savva (Walthamstow)	28.76	7/4jf	
1997	Flashy Get	Murlens Slippy - Flashy Fiona	Ernie Gaskin Sr. (Walthamstow)	28.75	14/1	
1998	Sarah Dee	Arrigle Buddy - Castlegannon Pop	Nick Savva (Walthamstow)	28.82	6/4f	
1999	Springtime	Vintage Prince - Meantime	Ger Watson (Ireland)	28.97	4/9f	
2000	Ragga Juju	Justright Melody - Cent Her Forward	Joanne Page (Milton Keynes)	29.29	7/1	
2001	Talktothehand	Top Honcho - Merry Bluebell	Jimmy Gibson (Belle Vue)	29.06	6/4jf	
2002	Purley Queen	Frisby Flashing - Traceys Whisper	Norah McEllistrim (Wimbledon)	29.14	8/1	
2003	Cooly Pantera	Spiral Nikita - Direen Havana	Brian Clemenson (Hove)	29.18	11/8f	
2004	Tidyplayroom	Smooth Rumble - Toss Stella	Derek Knight (Hove)	29.27	5/–1	
2005	Droopys Stacey	Droopys Kewell – Droopy Roberta	Ian Reilly (Ireland)	29.10	4/6f	
2006	Dilemmas Flight	Droopys Vieri – Early Flight	Nick Savva (Private)	28.96	7/1	
2007	Blonde Jeannie	Daves Mentor – Easy and Breezy	John Mullins (Private)	28.76	2/1	
2008	Meenala Amy	Droopys Shearer – Lassana Jenny	Kim Billingham (Monmore)	28.99	10/1	
2009	Shaws Dilemma	Droopys Vieri – Saffron Border	Liz McNair (Private)	28.52	5/2	
2010	Freedom Emma	Brett Lee – Miss Freckles	Richard Yeates (Oxford)	28.68	5/2	
2011	Silverview Perky	Head Bound - Owens Rover	Charlie Lister OBE (Private)	28.40	1/1f	
2012	Droopys Hope	Ace Hi Rumble – Droopys Darjina	Liz McNair (Private)	28.83	2/1	
2013	Droopys Danneel	Rumble Impact – Droopys Bubble	Kevin Hutton (Swindon)	27.97	7/4f	
2014	Cashen Maureen	Cashen Legend – Leigh Fantastic	Mark Wallis (Towcester)	27.99	4/6f	
2015	Domino Storm	Makeshift – Swift Erin	Mark Wallis (Towcester)	27.59	5/2	
2016	Forest Twilight	Ace Hi Rumble - Forest May	Hayley Keightley (Private)	27.79	6/4f	
2017	Wuheida	Head Bound - Droopys Thrill	Phil Simmonds (Romford)	28.74	11/4	
2018	Ravenswood Flo	Laughil Blake - Ravenswood May	Kevin Hutton (Monmore)	3/1		
2019	Bull Run Byte	Romeo Recruit –Tullowmac Java	Kevin Hutton (Monmore)	28.29	7/4	
2020	Ballymac Trend	Ballymac Best – Motobar Abigail	Angie Kibble (Swindon)	28.41	25/1	
2021	Billys Diva	Good News – Jaytee Sahara	Marie Kennedy (Ireland)	28.88	2/1f	
2022	Slick Sakina	Droopys Sydney – Droopys Ring	Patrick Janssens (Towcester)	27.85	11/8f	Track record
2023	No Rush	King Elvis – Vahsel Bay	Carol Weatherall (Monmore)	28.18	15/8f	
2024	Druids Say Go	Droopys Sydney – Druids Diana	Patrick Janssens (Towcester)	27.82	4/11f	
2025	Butlers Lane	Jacob Tashadelek – Coolavanny Model	Barry Denby (Nottingham)	27.95	7/2	
