= Greyhound Trust =

- Founded: 1975
- Type: National Charity
- Purpose: The homing and welfare of greyhounds
- Location: Britain
- Website: www.greyhoundtrust.org.uk

The Greyhound Trust is a national UK charity, founded in 1973 with the vision of “A day when all racing greyhounds retire to loving homes and are treated with compassion and kindness”. Originally founded as the National Greyhound Racing Club Retired Greyhound Trust, and known for many years as the “RGT”, the charity has found homes for over 100,000 greyhounds, and currently homes around 4,000 a year.

The Greyhound Trust is governed by a board of directors (trustees), chaired by Professor Steven Dean and led by the charity's chief executive, Lisa Morris. An incorporated charity, registered with the Charity Commission in England and the OSCR in Scotland (Registered Charity 269668 & SC044047). The trust operates a network of over 50 branches across the UK, with homing led locally by over 1,000 volunteers. Most branches have kennels with retired greyhounds that the public can meet and that are available for homing. The branch network is supported by a small team who operate from the Trust's National Support Centre in Surrey.

== Charity history ==
The Retired Greyhound Trust was formed in 1973 by The National Greyhound Racing Club, led by General Secretary, Fred Underhill OBE. The Animal Welfare Trust, led by Sydney Hicks, which until then had run the largest national programme in the UK for retired racing greyhounds, played an instrumental role.

The first chairman of trustees was Major General James Majury, who was the Senior Steward of the NGRC at the time. The NGRC employed Philip Barrow as the first National Organiser in 1973. He had previously been assistant secretary and Public Relations Officer of the Animal Welfare Trust.

The early years of the charity saw hundreds of greyhounds homed, and the establishment of local homing centres around Britain where dedicated volunteers would oversee the transition of racing greyhounds into family pets.

Over time the charity became known within greyhound circles as the 'RGT' as it became an independent charitable organisation. It established a national office in Surrey (Worcester Park) and increased its branch network, particularly in areas popular for greyhound racing, such as the Midlands and South East. The charity underwent a refresh of its national branding in 2017, becoming known as the 'Greyhound Trust'. The Head Office is in Worcester Park in Surrey and the Chief Executive is Lisa Morris-Tomkins. The Board of Trustees, who oversee governance of the charity, is chaired by Professor Steven Dean. As of 2020 the Trust was reportedly on the verge of insolvency following a move to new offices that has cost somewhere in the region of £1.7 million. Following the reports of insolvency, a Charity Commission review confirmed that the Greyhound Trust was Charity Commission compliant.

Since its formation, the Greyhound Trust has homed more than 100,000 greyhounds, and continues to home around 3,500 greyhounds a year.

== Funding ==
The Greyhound Trust is an independent charity, funded entirely by donation. The Greyhound Board of Great Britain contributes £200 to the homing of Greyhounds who enter the Greyhound Trust through its Greyhound Retirement Scheme (which is match funding in addition to the £200 that the owner of the Greyhound has paid towards the cost of homing their Greyhound through the scheme). The GBGB through the British Greyhound Racing Fund (BGRF) no longer provide an annual grant (which was previously £1.3 million in 2019) to Greyhound Trust, which was derived from a voluntary levy paid by a selection of bookmakers, instead directing part of that funding to the Greyhound Retirement Scheme, but with more emphasis now being placed on owners to contribute. The remaining donors are the general public, through national and local level fundraising initiatives and around 20% of the Trust's funding comes from gifts left to the Trust in wills.

== See also ==
- Blue Cross (animal charity)
