= Pelaw Grange =

Stadium in Chester-le-Street, England

Star Pelaw
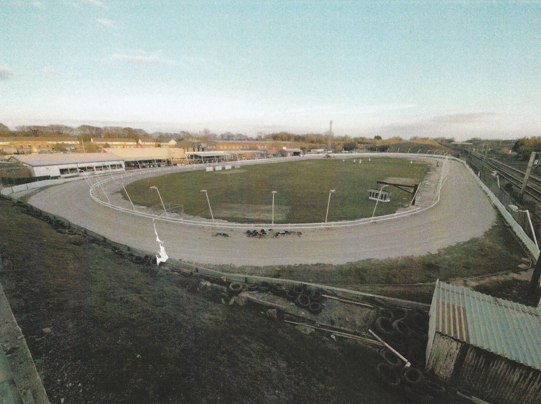
- The stadium circa.1980
- Interactive map of Star Pelaw
- Former names: Pelaw Grange Stadium
- Location: Drum Road, Chester-le-Street DH3 2AF
- Coordinates: 54°52′37.6″N 1°34′43.3″W
- Owner: Star Sports

Construction
- Opened: 1944*

Tenant
- Greyhound racing

Website
- Official website

Pelaw Grange Stadium (known as Star Pelaw for sponsorship purposes) is a Greyhound Board of Great Britain regulated greyhound racing track located at North Lodge in the English county of Durham, between Chester-le-Street and Gateshead. The stadium has a restaurant and a number of bars and is owned by Star Sports.

Racing takes place every Tuesday, Thursday & Sunday evening. Occasionally Saturday nights & Bank Holiday Mondays.

Competitions run at Star Pelaw Include Rose Bowl, Stewards Cup, Star Sports On-Course Vase, Alan Dobbin Derby.

== Origins and opening ==
A greyhound track situated north of Chester-le-Street was constructed and named after Pelaw Grange a nearby country house and farm directly to the east. It was reportedly built in 1944* by a man called George Towers to the south of Drum Road and directly next to the railway with the back straight running parallel to the east side of the railway. It served the local population in the area with independent racing (unlicensed). The entire area was a hot bed of greyhound racing with links to the mining communities that lived in the county of Durham. It is also believed that there was a larger greyhound stadium just to the north in Birtley.

The stadium was taken over by Joe and Joyce McKenna in January 1965, racing every Thursday and Saturday. The racing consisted of level and handicap races over distances of 241, 410 & 570 yards with an inside hare. The McKenna's son Jeff eventually became the track promoter and he continued to offer independent racing taking the role of General and Racing Manager combined. Facilities improved over the years with the 360y circumference track becoming all-sand in the eighties. Competitions were introduced called the Newcastle Rose Bowl & Whitfield Oaks. There was computerised tote, car parking for 200 vehicles, three bars and two glass fronted stands.

== Licensed racing ==
In 2005 Jeff McKenna and his wife Theresa changed over to race under rules after sixty years as an independent track. The application to the National Greyhound Racing Club was passed and the switchover took place on Monday 22 August with the first racing on Thursday 25 June 2005.

The track installed Graeme Henigan as Racing Manager and there was also success from local trainers in National competitions including a National Sprint title for Clounlaheen trained by Mick Hurst. The track today runs every Friday, Saturday and Sunday lunchtime with the current Racing Manager being David Gray. The track celebrated fifty years under the McKenna's in August 2015 by hosting a Sky Sports television fixture for the first time featuring a meeting sponsored by Pin Point Recruitment.

In 2018 the stadium signed a deal with ARC to race every Sunday evening. In 2021, Jaguar Macie trained by Pelaw Grange attached Graham Rankin won the Ladbrokes Puppy Derby and the Northern Puppy Derby.

In 2024, it was announced that the stadium had changed ownership with Star Sports purchasing the site from Jeff McKenna. Star Sports (owned by Ben Keith) renamed the stadium Star Pelaw.

In 2025, the stadium took delivery of Crayford's hurdles following its demise and Pelaw would become the only track in the United Kingdom to hold hurdles races. Holding its first Hurdle race on the 24th March 2026.

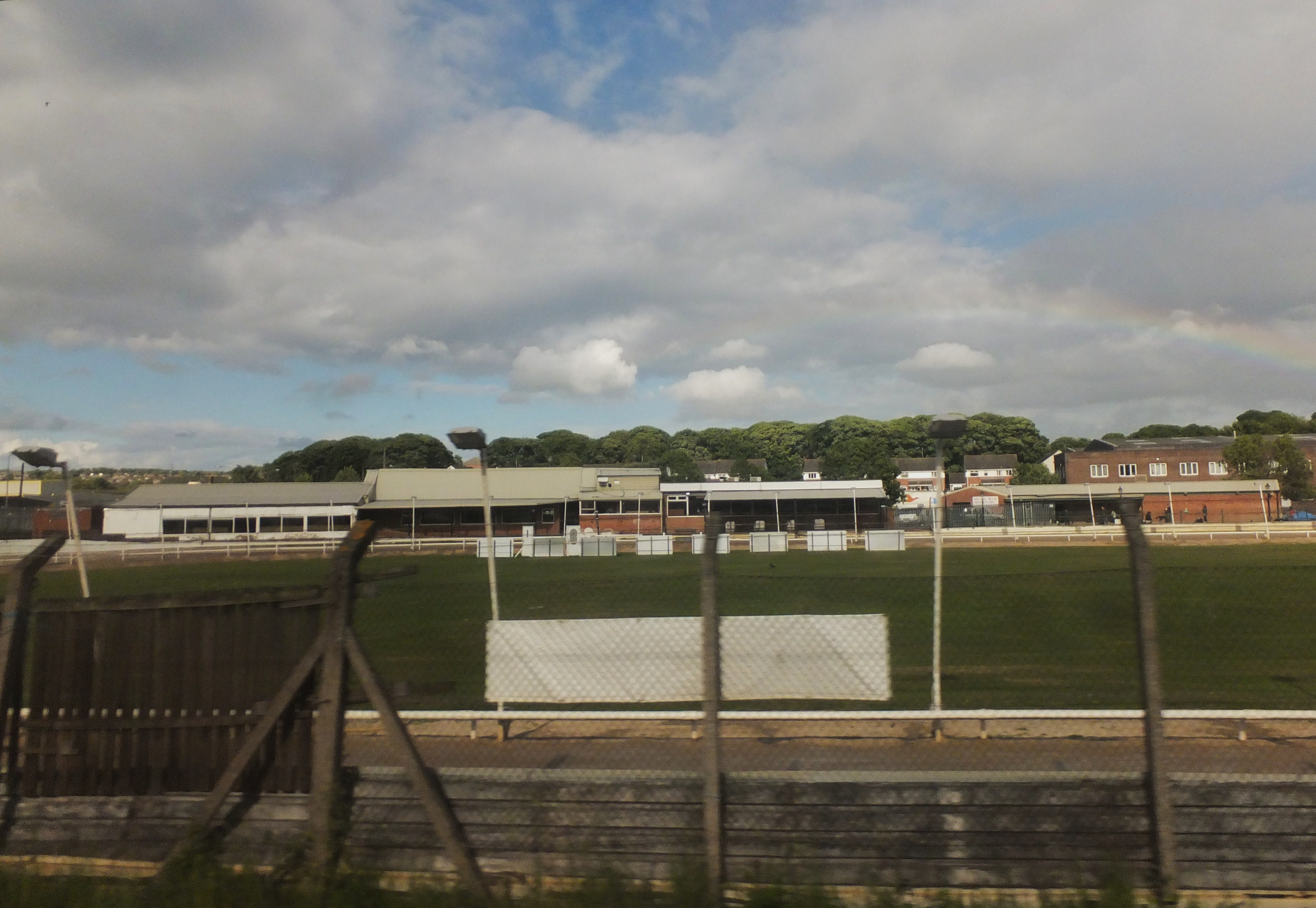
The stadium in 2013

== Track records ==
=== Current ===
Metres	Greyhound	Time (sec)	Date	Notes
245	Foulkscourt Bono	14.20	2 May 2026	
435	Blue Genisis	25.13	26 December 2007	
590	Emilys Superstar	35.47	4 October 2025	
780	Calzaghe Lisa	47.88	11 August 2015	

=== Former ===
Extended content

Distance metres	Greyhound	Time	Date	Notes
245	Craan Fleece	14.78	24 March 2008	
245	Mill Pearl	14.57	8 September 2008	
245	Lampard	14.51	28 May 2011	
260	Stouke Society	15.52	4 February 2006	
435	Family Title	25.46	23 September 2006	
435	Maglass Legend	25.35	10 September 2007	
590	Travelyans Corn	36.48	24 March 2008	
590	Malden Flight	36.05	25 August 2008	
590	Malden Flight	35.86	8 September 2008	
590	Droopys Freda	35.75	15 September 2008	
605	Zigzag Kit	36.84	26 December 2005	
605	Beren	37.51	26 December 2005	
605	Amolee Classic	37.28	24 July 2006	
605	Joyous Leader	37.20	28 August 2006	
605	Blue Tom Cat	36.98	30 October 2006	
605	Stretching Out	36.96	27 August 2007	
605	Droopys Freda	36.81	26 December 2007	
780	Schofield Bertie	48.46	5 May 2008	
