= Dunstall Park Greyhound Stadium =

Greyhound racing venue in England

- Interactive map of Dunstall Park Greyhound Stadium
- Location: Wolverhampton, West Midlands, England
- Coordinates: 52°36′16″N 2°08′36″W
- Owner: Arena Racing Company
- Surface: Sand

Construction
- Opened: 8 September 2025

Website
- Official website

Dunstall Park Greyhound Stadium is a greyhound racing track located within Wolverhampton Racecourse at Wolverhampton, West Midlands, England. The stadium is certified by the Greyhound Board of Great Britain.

== Opening ==
The stadium opened on 8 September 2025, becoming the first track in Britain to open since the 2014 opening of Towcester and follows the idea of Towcester, in that it has been built within the boundaries of the horse racing course. The first winner was Sovereign Poppy over 480 metres.

The build started in the spring of 2025, although the plans had been drawn up and submitted several years previously and was given planning permission in 2023. The owners Arena Racing Company announced their intention to move the entire greyhound racing operation from Perry Barr Stadium, which closed to greyhound racing when Dunstall Park opened due to the expiry of the existing lease at Perry Barr.

The Category 1 race, called the Oaks and the category 2 race the Scurry Gold Cup, were held at the track throughout October 2025, with the finals on 24 October 2025. On 7 March 2026 Dunstall Park staged the first dual horse racing and greyhound racing fixture in Britain, with greyhound racing taking place after the afternoon horse race meeting.

== Competitions ==
- The Oaks
- Scurry Gold Cup
- St Leger
- The Laurels
- Dunstall Dash
