= 2023 UK & Ireland Greyhound Racing Year =

98th year of UK and Irish greyhound racing

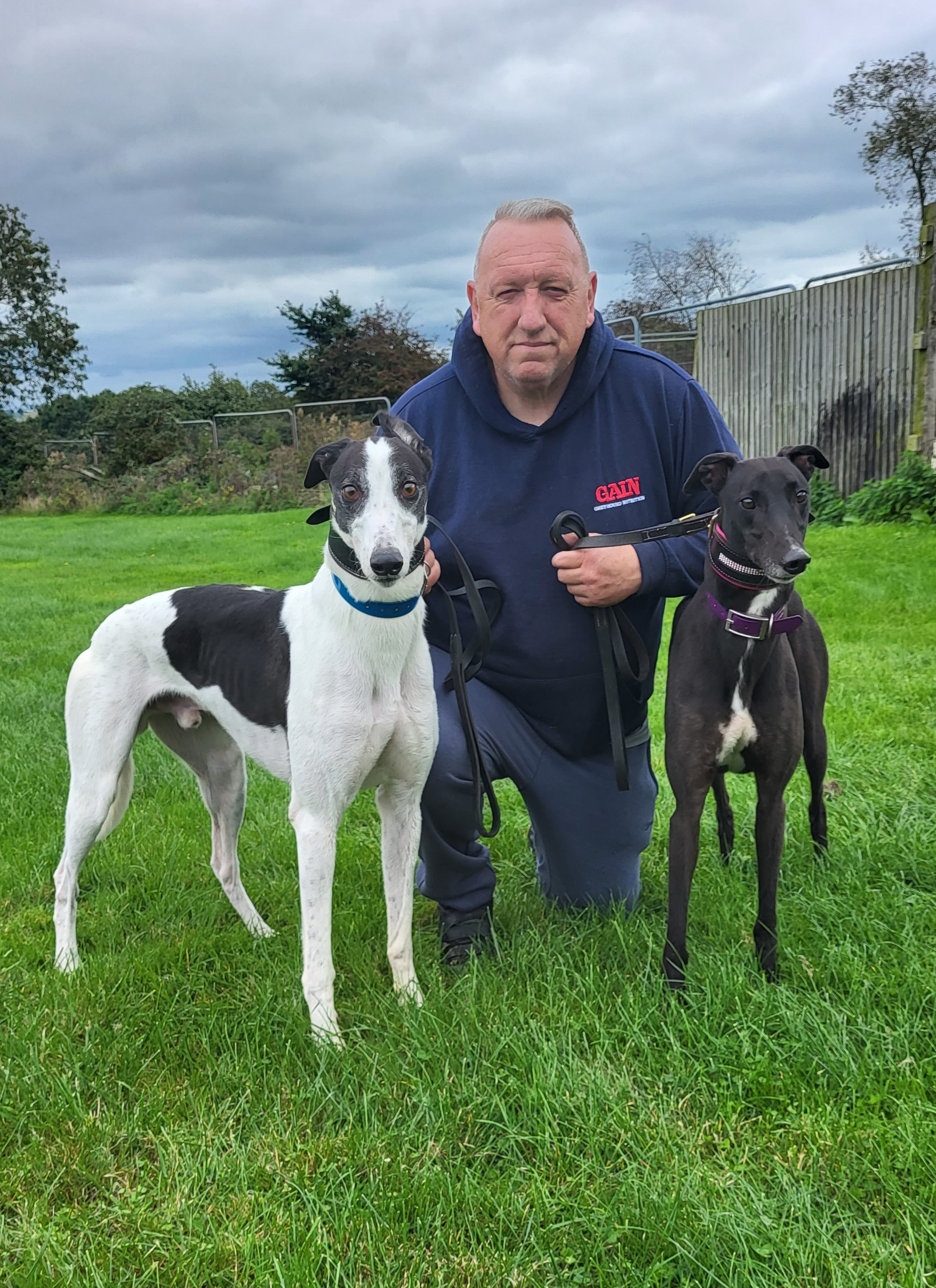
- Category 1 finalists Millridge Tanic (left) and Olga with trainer Pat Curtin

2023 UK & Ireland Greyhound Racing Year was the 98th year of greyhound racing in the United Kingdom and the 97th year of greyhound racing in Ireland.

== Summary ==
Open race competitions increased again, in terms of prize money and frequency, with no less than ten UK events (not including the Derby) offering a first prize of £20,000 or more, including the returning Pall Mall Stakes at Oxford Stadium and a series of events sponsored by Premier Greyhound Racing. It equalled the Irish open race calendar in terms of number of races above £20,000 or €20,000.

A petition titled The Welsh Government should support greyhound racing in Wales was due to be debated by the Senedd because over 10,000 signatures were received in support. The petition was in response to the 2022 petition. A main subject of the debate was the Valley Greyhound Stadium and in August 2023, Valley received a licence from the Greyhound Board of Great Britain. The move from independent racing to GBGB rules meant that only one track Thornton Stadium remained with independent status.

The long running saga over live broadcast rights continued and with Entain and ARC nearing the new 2024 deal, their rival SIS published a schedule. The schedule included Oxford, Towcester, Harlow, Suffolk Downs, Henlow, Doncaster and the Valley in addition to Askern Greyhound Stadium, which would require re-opening and a GBGB licence to be included in the schedule.

Mark Wallis won his 14th Greyhound Trainer of the Year title after recording 1591 points. The year ended with the death of former Northern Sports group manager Mick Wheble MBE.

Following a GBGB inspection of trainer Rebecca Perkins' kennels, they contacted the RSPCA reporting offences contrary to the Animal Welfare Act. Perkins' received a jail sentence and was banned from keeping animals for life after "causing unnecessary suffering to more than 30 dogs".

== Roll of honour ==
Major Winners
Award	Name of Winner
2023 English Greyhound Derby	Gaytime Nemo
2023 Irish Greyhound Derby	The Other Kobe
Greyhound Trainer of the Year	Mark Wallis
UK Greyhound of the Year	Droopys Clue
Irish Greyhound of the Year	The Other Kobe

Premier Greyhound Racing Trainers Championship, Perry Barr (6 Apr)
Pos	Name of Trainer	Points
1st	Patrick Janssens	46
2nd	Kevin Hutton	44
3rd	Mark Wallis	40
4th	John Mullins	34
5th	Matt Dartnall	27
6th	Richard Rees	12

=== Principal UK finals ===
Premier Greyhound Racing Golden Jacket, Crayford (18 Feb, 714m, £20,000)
Pos	Name of Greyhound	Trap	SP	Time	Trainer
1st	Bellmore Sally	4	9/4jf	44.77	Jimmy Fenwick
2nd	Roll On Sydney	1	6/1	45.01	Paul Young
3rd	Olga	5	6/1	45.31	Paddy Curtin
4th	Minnie Bullet	2	9/4jf	45.39	Mark Wallis
5th	Burgess Hannah	6	11/2	45.85	Tony Gifkins
6th	Coonough Crow	3	8/1	45.75	Mark Wallis

Ladbrokes TV Trophy, Crayford (15 April, 874m, £15,000)
Pos	Name of Greyhound	Trap	SP	Time	Trainer
1st	Bellmore Sally	4	10/11f	56.38	James Fenwick
2nd	Ower Smasher	3	13/8	56.66	June Harvey
3rd	A Mystial Love	6	12/1	56.98	Lee Pearce
4th	Beach Babe	5	28/1	57.56	Tom Levers
5th	Savana Queen	2	14/1	57.90	Diane Henry
6th	Queen Pink	1	9/1	57.96	Liz McNair

Arena Racing Company Laurels, Perry Barr (29 Apr, 480m, £12,500)
Pos	Name of Greyhound	Trap	SP	Time	Trainer
1st	Hawkfield Ozark	1	15/8f	28.03	Patrick Janssens
2nd	Goldies Perryman	3	4/1	28.05	Paul Foster
3rd	Hurry Up Jordan	6	3/1	28.27	John Lambe
4th	Arkady	4	11/4	28.35	David Mullins
5th	Ivanexile	5	7/1	28.45	Matt Dartnall
N/R	Coolavanny Shado	2			Patrick Janssens

Premier Greyhound Racing Regency, Brighton (29 Jul, 695m, £20,000)
Pos	Name of Greyhound	Trap	SP	Time	Trainer
1st	Space Jet	3	2/1jf	41.69	Matt Dartnall
2nd	Swiper	1	11/1	41.85	Matt Dartnall
3rd	Lively Lauren	2	2/1jf	41.88	Matt Dartnall
4th	Jacktavern Magic	6	12/1	41.99	Mark Wallis
5th	Bubbly Scorcher	5	11/2	42.01	Paul Young
6th	Savana Heross	4	4/1	42.05	Diane Henry

Stadium Bookmakers Pall Mall, Oxford (29 Jul, 450m, £20,000)
Pos	Name of Greyhound	Trap	SP	Time	Trainer
1st	Links Maverick	3	8/11f	26.72	Tom Heilbron
2nd	Eze	4	8/1	26.96	Angie Kibble
3rd	Hawkfield Ozark	1	7/2	27.11	Patrick Janssens
4th	Ivanexile	5	10/3	27.21	Matt Dartnall
5th	Coppice Tenzin	5	14/1	27.24	Kevin Hutton
6th	Moments of Magic	2	33/1	27.28	Kevin Hutton

Premier Greyhound Racing St Leger, Perry Barr (23 Sep, 710m, £20,000)
Pos	Name of Greyhound	Trap	SP	Time	Trainer
1st	Droopys Clue	2	4/9f	42.33 (TR)	Seamus Cahill
2nd	Jacktavern Bella	5	5/2	42.81	Graham Holland
3rd	Millridge Tanic	6	8/1	43.51	Paddy Curtin
4th	Lightfoot Clark	1	25/1	43.79	James Fenwick
5th	Coonough Crow	3	16/1	43.89	Mark Wallis
N/R	Garfiney Blaze	4			Graham Holland

Premier Greyhound Racing Champion Stakes, Romford (21 Oct, 575m, £20,000)
Pos	Name of Greyhound	Trap	SP	Time	Trainer
1st	Hollow Man	4	8/13f	34.96	Derek Knight
2nd	Ninja Kerry	6	11/2	35.19	Belinda Green
3rd	Whyaye Man	5	10/1	35.23	Mark Wallis
4th	Havana Top Note	3	11/1	35.24	Liz McNair
5th	Droopys Google	1	9/2	35.32	Nathan Hunt
6th	Ballintee Noshow	2	12/1	35.60	Maxine Locke

Premier Greyhound Racing Oaks, Perry Barr (27 Oct, 480m, £20,000)
Pos	Name of Greyhound	Trap	SP	Time	Trainer
1st	No Rush	6	15/8f	28.18	Carol Weatherall
2nd	Jet Stream Angel	4	5/1	28.22	Kevin Hutton
3rd	Droopys Ailsa	5	4/1	28.28	Robert Gleeson
4th	Whats Up Eva	2	4/1	28.32	Richard Rees
5th	Starshinestunner	1	7/2	28.42	Richard Rees
6th	Droopys Request	3	14/1	28.84	Christopher Fereday

=== Principal Irish finals ===
Bresbet Easter Cup, Shelbourne (8 Apr, 550y, €25,000)
Pos	Name of Greyhound	Trap	SP	Time	Trainer
1st	Swords Rex	1	11/8f	29.71	Graham Holland
2nd	Tooklmaker Wilde	6	22/1	29.99	Robert G Gleeson
3rd	Trinity Junior	2	8/1	30.02	Peter Cronin
4th	Romeo Magico	5	4/1	30.09	Graham Holland
5th	Galloping Sydney	4	6/1	30.16	Graham Holland
6th	Bockos Crystal	3	3/1	30.23	Graham Holland

Con & Annie Kirby Memorial, Limerick (21 Apr, 525y, €80,000)
Pos	Name of Greyhound	Trap	SP	Time	Trainer
1st	Clonbrien Treaty	1	5/2	28.05	Graham Holland
2nd	Bogger Lucky	6	6/1	28.64	Liam Peacock
3rd	Scaglietti	3	6/1	28.75	Patrick Guilfoyle
4th	Gaytime Hugo	4	4/1	28.92	Graham Holland
5th	Ryhope Beach	5	9/4f	29.13	Michael J O'Donovan
6th	Hovex Tommy	2	10/1	29.31	Graham Holland

Sporting Press Oaks, Shelbourne Park (17 Jun, 525y, €25,000)
Pos	Name of Greyhound	Trap	SP	Time	Trainer
1st	Crafty Shivoo	1	3/1	28.14	Peter & Brian Divilly
2nd	Scooby Duchess	6	8/1	28.38	Jennifer O'Donnell
3rd	Glengar Martha	5	10/1	28.42	Pat Buckley
4th	Bobsleigh Dream	3	6/4f	28.49	Pat Buckley
5th	Quivers Magic	2	7/2	29.47	Adam Dunford
6th	Droopys Timing	4	5/1	00.00	Paul Conin

Thatch Bar & Restaurant National Produce, Clonmel (25 Jun, 525y, €20,000)
Pos	Name of Greyhound	Trap	SP	Time	Trainer
1st	Burgess Supreme	5	20/1	28.52	Sheila Spillane
2nd	Hukum	2	4/1	28.56	Adam Dunford
3rd	Ower Mystery	4	7/2	28.57	Pat Buckley
4th	Clonbrien Treaty	6	13/8f	28.74	Graham Holland
5th	Mendelson	3	20/1	28.85	Thomas O'Donovan
6th	Clona Shadow	1	11/4	28.99	Graham Holland

Boylesports Champion Stakes, Shelbourne Park (8 Jul, 550y, €20,000)
Pos	Name of Greyhound	Trap	SP	Time	Trainer
1st	Trinity Junior	1	5/2f	29.34	Peter Cronin
2nd	The Other Kobe	5	4/1	29.48	Jennifer O'Donnell
3rd	Boylesports Gift	4	12/1	29.72	Paul Hennessy
4th	Droopys Nice One	6	11/2	29.73	Murt Leahy
5th	Hawkfield Blue	3	9/2	30.64	Keeley McGee
6th	Scaglietti	2	11/4	31.41	Patrick Guilfoyle

Time Dundalk International, Dundalk (12 Jul, 550y, €20,000)
Pos	Name of Greyhound	Trap	SP	Time	Trainer
1st	Raha Mofo	5	4/1	29.98	Murt Leahy
2nd	Ballinabola Ed	6	4/6f	29.99	Pat Buckley
3rd	Brookside Richie	3	7/1	30.11	James Fenwick (UK)
4th	Cochise	1	20/1	30.25	Richard Rees (UK)
5th	Bobsleigh Dream	4	11/2	30.37	Pat Buckley
6th	Ballymac Whispa	2	25/1	30.44	Liam Dowling

Bar One Racing Irish Sprint Cup, Dundalk (15 Aug, 400y, €20,000)
Pos	Name of Greyhound	Trap	SP	Time	Trainer
1st	Carrick Aldo	5	-	20.80	David Murray
2nd	Who Have I	4	-	20.99	Michael J. O'Donovan
3rd	Ballymac Samuel	1	-	21.04	Liam Dowling
4th	Chelms Skippy	6	-	21.08	Peter Cronin
5th	Rathdown Molly	3	-	21.22	Marie Gilbert
6th	Radical Hero	2	-	21.27	Thomas O'Donovan

Time Greyhound Nutrition Juvenile Derby, Shelbourne Park (30 Sep, 525y, €25,000)
Pos	Name of Greyhound	Trap	SP	Time	Trainer
1st	Droopys Flytline	6	15/8f	27.93	Robert G. Gleeson
2nd	Short Grip	1	7/2	28.00	Patrick Cocoman
3rd	Droopys Zelda	3	12/1	28.28	John A. Linehan
4th	Unmatched	4	16/1	28.38	John A. Linehan
5th	Highview Splash	5	4/1	28.63	Gerry Merriman
6th	Ballinakill Alf	2	5/2	28.66	Graham Holland

Bar One Racing Irish Laurels, Cork (14 Oct, 525y, €30,000)
Pos	Name of Greyhound	Trap	SP	Time	Trainer
1st	High Trend	2	8/1	28.31	Graham Holland
2nd	Easy Razzle	5	6/1	28.34	John A. Linehan
3rd	Role Model	4	22/1	28.52	Owen McKenna
4th	Jacktavern Bolt	1	2/1jf	28.83	Graham Holland
5th	Carrick Aldo	6	2/1jf	28.87	David Murray
6th	Glory Baz	3	4/1	28.89	Graham Holland

Will We Go Irish St Leger, Limerick (25 Nov, 550y, €30,000)
Pos	Name of Greyhound	Trap	SP	Time	Trainer
1st	Clonbrien Treaty	6	5/4f	29.51	Graham Holland
2nd	Swords Rex	3	10/3	29.54	Graham Holland
3rd	Sober Glory	2	4/1	29.61	Karol Ramsbottom
4th	Mr Chelm	5	14/1	29.62	Peter Cronin
5th	Ballinabola Una	1	6/1	29.69	Pat Buckley
6th	Beepers Lariat	4	12/1	29.80	Jack Kennelly

=== Calendar ===
Date	Competition	Venue	1st prize	Winner
15 Jan	Cesarewitch	Central Park	£12,500	Cochise
20 Jan	Diamond Stakes	Oxford	£10,000	Mohican Tara
27 Jan	Coral Essex Vase	Romford	£10,000	Aayamza Magic
27 Jan	BGBF Puppy Cup	Oxford	£10,000	Watchhall Sid
29 Jan	Stadium Bookmakers Blue Riband	Towcester	£10,000	Hopes Paddington
16 Feb	Northern Puppy Derby	Newcastle	£12,500	Links Maverick
18 Feb	Golden Jacket	Crayford	£20,000	Bellmore Sally
25 Feb	Shelbourne Gold Cup	Shelbourne	€16,000	Bogger Hunter
4 Mar	Ladbrokes Winter Derby	Monmore	£10,000	Coolavanny Shado
11 Mar	Greyhound & Petworld Juvenile Classic	Tralee	€11,000	Ballymac Marino
17 Mar	Coral Golden Sprint	Romford	£10,000	Droopys Good
17 Mar	Coral Coronation Cup	Romford	£10,000	Antigua Sugar
18 Mar	Premier Greyhound Racing Puppy Derby	Monmore	£20,000	Bradys Bullet
20 Mar	BGBF British Breeders Stakes	Nottingham	£12,500	Romeo Command
24 Mar	Frightful Flash Kennels McCalmont Cup	Kilkenny	€5,000	Lynchy Boy
26 Mar	RPGTV Irish Cesarewitch	Mullingar	€6,000	Bobsleigh Dream
29 Mar	Arena Racing Company Kent Plate	Central Park	£12,500	Fromposttopillar
30 Mar	Arena Racing Company Northern Flat	Newcastle	£12,500	Brookside Richie
2 Apr	RPGTV Juvenile	Towcester	£5,000	Arkady
8 Apr	Bresbet Easter Cup	Shelbourne	€25,000	Swords Rex
15 Apr	Steel City Puppy Derby	Sheffield	£15,000	Droopys Fidget
15 Apr	Ladbrokes TV Trophy	Crayford	£15,000	Bellmore Sally
15 Apr	Champion Hurdle	Crayford	£10,000	Lenson Doolin
21 Apr	Arena Racing Company Grand Prix	Sunderland	£12,500	Coonough Crew
21 Apr	Con & Annie Kirby Memorial	Limerick	€80,000	Clonbrien Treaty
22 Apr	bet365 Hunt Cup	Oxford	£10,000	Havana Lover
23 Apr	KAB Maiden Derby	Towcester	£10,000	Drive On Lad
29 Apr	Coral Brighton Belle	Hove	£10,000	Betsys Bullet
29 Apr	TIME Greyhound Nutrition Waterford Select Stakes	Waterford	€10,000	Clona Duke
29 Apr	Arena Racing Company Laurels	Perry Barr	£12,500	Hawkfield Ozark
6 May	RPGTV Open	Shelbourne	€15,000	Ballinabola Ed
7 May	BresBet Gymcrack	Kinsley	£9,000	Stormy News
27 May	Ladbrokes Kent Vase	Crayford	£1,000	Beebee Bianco
27 May	Jay & Kay Coach Tours Kent St Leger	Crayford	£10,000	Low Pressure
30 May	Three Steps to Victory	Sheffield	£10,000	Distant Emma
11 June	ARC Kent Silver Salver	Central Park	£12,500	Flashing Willow
16 Jun	Callaway Ramber at Stud Race of Champions	Tralee	€15,000	Ballinabola Ed
17 Jun	Sporting Press Oaks	Shelbourne	€25,000	Crafty Shivoo
25 Jun	Thatch Bar & Restaurant National Produce	Clonmel	€20,000	Burgess Supreme
1 Jul	Star Sports & TRC Events & Leisure English Greyhound Derby	Towcester	£235,000	Gaytime Nemo
8 Jul	Boylesports Champion Stakes	Shelbourne	€20,000	Trinity Junior
12 Jul	Time Dundalk International	Dundalk	€20,000	Raha Mofo
15 Jul	RPGTV Corn Cuchulainn	Shelbourne	€10,500	Kinturk Road
16 Jul	Centenary Agri Tipperary Cup	Thurles	€7,500	Pape Di Oro
27 Jul	ARC Angel of the North	Newcastle	£6,000	Magical Camilla
29 Jul	Pall Mall Stakes	Oxford	£20,000	Links Maverick
29 Jul	Premier Greyhound Racing Regency	Hove	£20,000	Space Jet
29 Jul	Coral Springbok	Hove	£5,000	Droopys Chaser
29 Jul	Coral Sussex Cup	Hove	£10,000	Candolim Monsson
30 Jul	Juvenile Classic	Towcester	£10,000	Droopys Clue
15 Aug	Bar One Racing Irish Sprint Cup	Dundalk	€20,000	Carrick Aldo
26 Aug	Ladbrokes Guys and Dolls	Crayford	£5,000	Swift Daisy
26 Aug	Ladbrokes Grand National	Crayford	£10,000	Coppice Fox
26 Aug	Ladbrokes Summer Stayers Classic	Monmore	£10,000	Fromposttopillar
26 Aug	Ladbrokes Gold Cup	Monmore	£10,000	Links Maverick
28 Aug	JenningsBet Puppy Classic	Nottingham	£12,500	Glenvale Bill
28 Aug	JenningsBet Select Stakes	Nottingham	£10,000	Clona Duke
2 Sep	Boylesports Irish Greyhound Derby	Shelbourne	€125,000	The Other Kobe
20 Sep	Click Competitions East Anglian Derby	Yarmouth	£15,000	Watch The Limo
21 Sep	77th Produce Stakes	Swindon	£13,000	Queen Joni
23 Sep	M Lambe Construction Birmingham Cup	Perry Barr	£12,500	Brookside Richie
23 Sep	Premier Greyhound Racing St Leger	Perry Barr	£20,000	Droopys Clue
24 Sep	Empress Stakes	Towcester	£10,000	Crafty Shivoo
29 Sep	Coral Romford Puppy Cup	Romford	£10,000	Romeo Crusade
30 Sep	Time Greyhound Nutrition Juvenile Derby	Shelbourne	€25,000	Droopys Flytline
14 Oct	Bar One Racing Irish Laurels	Cork	€30,000	High Trend
17 Oct	BresBet Steel City Cup	Sheffield	£8,000	Swift Iconic
20 Oct	Premier Greyhound Racing Champion Stakes	Romford	£20,000	Hollow Man
27 Oct	Cowley Puppy Collar	Oxford	£10,000	Long Fellow
28 Oct	ARC Scurry Gold Cup	Perry Barr	£6,000	Quarteira
28 Oct	Premier Greyhound Racing Oaks	Perry Barr	£20,000	No Rush
29 Oct	Premier Greyhound Racing Kent Derby	Central Park	£20,000	Churchfield Syd
17 Nov	ARC Classic	Sunderland	£12,500	Jonny Whiskers
25 Nov	Ladbrokes Gold Collar	Crayford	£10,000	Laughil Jess
25 Nov	Kent Rosebowl	Crayford	£1,000	Oh Cosmopolitan
25 Nov	Yorkshire St Leger	Doncaster	£3,000	Fabulous Dyna
25 Nov	Willwego Irish St Leger	Limerick	€30,000	Clonbrien Treaty
26 Nov	RPGTV Puppy Derby	Towcester	£10,000	King Memphis
27 Nov	Premier Greyhound Racing Eclipse	Nottingham	£20,000	Newinn Syd
17 Dec	bet365 Puppy Oaks	Towcester	£10,000	Queen Dusty
19 Dec	British Bred Breeders Forum Derby	Sheffield	£10,000	Queen Joni
22 Dec	bet365 Challenge Cup	Oxford	£10,000	Havana Top Note
23 Dec	George Curtis/Ballyregan Bob Memorial	Hove	£10,000	Droopys Clue
23 Dec	Coral Olympic	Hove	£10,000	King Memphis
26 Dec	ARC National Sprint	Nottingham	£6,000	Bombout Bullet
28 Dec	Premier Greyhound Racing All England Cup	Newcastle	£20,000	Swift Silly
