= 2024 Irish Greyhound Derby =

Annual sporting event in Ireland

2024 Boylesports Irish Greyhound Derby
- Location: Shelbourne Park
- Start date: Friday 18 October
- End date: Saturday 23 November
- Competitors: 156
- Total prize money: €300,000 (winner €125,000)

The 2024 Boylesports Irish Greyhound Derby took place during October and November 2024, with the final being held on 23 November at Shelbourne Park. The competition was sponsored by BoyleSports and the prize money purse was €300,000, of which €125,000 went to the winner.

The competition was moved from its traditional summer slot sue to a major refurbishment of Shelbourne Park.

The winner was a black dog called Bockos Diamond, trained by Graham Holland, bred by Joseph O'Connor and owned by the Remember Them Syndicate. Bockos Diamond broke and equalled the track record in two rounds of the competition, on his way to an unbeaten success. Six flawless runs saw him become the shortest-priced winner of a final in the event's history and extend his race record to a 15th consecutive win in just his 16th race.

== Details ==
The first round was held on 18 & 19 October, second round on 25 & 26 October, third round on 2 November, quarter finals on 9 November and semi finals on 16 November.

Ante-post betting installed Bockos Diamond as the 6/1 favourite, following 9 consecutive wins. Callaway Knegare was 7/1, De Lahdedah (the 2024 English Greyhound Derby winner) was 10/1, Bombay Pat and British challenger March On Freddie were both 12/1.

== Quarter finals ==
Heat 1 (9 Nov)
Pos	Name	SP	Time
1st	Bombay Pat	5/2	29.19
2nd	Ballinabola Jim	5/1	29.61
3rd	March On Freddie	4/1	29.89
4th	Superfast Gorden	14/1	29.96
5th	De Lahdedah	6/4f	30.13
6th	Cheque For Cash	14/1	30.24

Heat 2 (9 Nov)
Pos	Name	SP	Time
1st	A Lucky Julie	9/1	29.31
2nd	Cheap Sandwiches	4/9f	29.34
3rd	Singalong Dolly	10/1	29.40
4th	Mustang Fever	28/1	29.64
5th	Ballymac Briar	20/1	29.71
6th	Untold Dollar	7/2	29.82

Heat 3 (9 Nov)
Pos	Name	SP	Time
1st	Carrick Aldo	11/10f	29.15
2nd	Boylesports Bob	3/1	29.18
3rd	Da Bold Falcon	5/1	29.50
4th	Extra Gain	25/1	29.60
5th	Is She There	40/1	29.67
6th	Undulation	10/3	29.74

Heat 4 (9 Nov)
Pos	Name	SP	Time
1st	Bockos Diamond	3/10f	29.19
2nd	Callaway Knegare	7/2	29.50
3rd	Seven Beach	12/1	29.68
4th	Short Grip	33/1	29.70
5th	Hawkfield Blue	6/5f	29.71
6th	Scooby Pacemaker	40/1	29.74

== Semi finals ==
First semi final (16 Nov)
Pos	Name of Greyhound	SP	Time	Trainer
1st	Bockos Diamond	8/13f	28.94TR	Holland
2nd	Callaway Knegare	11/2	29.32	McKenna
3rd	A Lucky Julie	18/1	29.33	Melia
4th	Bombay Pat	7/1	29.34	Holland
5th	Carrick Aldo	11/2	29.35	Murray
6th	Seven Beach	12/1	29.70	O'Donnell

Second semi final (16 Nov)
Pos	Name of Greyhound	SP	Time	Trainer
1st	Cheap Sandwiches	3/1f	29.13	Holland
2nd	Singalong Dolly	5/1	29.41	Buckley
3rd	Boylesports Bob	7/2	29.51	Hennessy
4th	Da Bold Falcon	9/2	29.52	McGee
5th	March on Freddie	11/2	29.94	Mullins
6th	Ballinabola Jim	7/2	00.00	Murphy

== Final ==
At Shelbourne Park (over 550 yards):

Position	Greyhound	Breeding	Trap	Sectional	SP	Time (sec)	Comment	Trainer
1st	Bockos Diamond	Dorotas Wildcat – Seaglas Shadow	6	3.40	3/10f	29.25	Led1, DrwClr	Graham Holland
2nd	Cheap Sandwiches	Burgess Bucks – Hearthill Josie	3	3.40	7/1	29.32	A2nd, ChlRnIn	Graham Holland
3rd	Callaway Knegare	Droopys Sydney – Droopys Sweet	1	3.41	9/1	29.39	ChlRnUp, A3rd	Owen McKenna
4th	Singalong Dolly	Droopys Sydney – Mydras Dawn	2	3.47	25/1	29.44	EvAw, RnOn	Pat Buckley
5th	Boylesports Bob	Good News – Roanna Bess	5	3.54	22/1	29.45	Crd1, NvShw	Paul Hennessy
6th	A Lucky Julie	Ballymac Bolger – Julies Paradise	4	3.54	20/1	29.66	SAw, W4	James Melia

=== Distances ===
1, 1, ¾, short head, 3

(0.07 sec = one length)

== Competition report ==
The competition seemed to be lacking the number of star names usually associated with the event due in part to the revised dates and also the fact that some of the expected challengers were either injured or retired. They included the defending champion The Other Kobe, Easter Cup and St Leger champion Clonbrien Treaty, Swords Rex, Champion Stakes winner Daleroad Duke and Dundalk International winner Droopys Mandolin.

Antepost favourite Bockos Diamond recorded 29.23 on the opening first round night, with Bombay Pat next best with 29.34. Clona Duke won his heat but last years runner-up Bockos Crystal failed to progress. Boylesports Bob and March On Freddie both impressed on the second night with a 29.25 and 29.19 runs respectively and Kirby Memorial winner Knockeen Dazzler also won his heat but Laurels champion Crafty Shivoo was eliminated.

March On Freddie and Oaks champion A Lucky Julie both scored second round wins but Clona Duke and Produce champion Unanimouspanther were eliminated. However, Bockos Diamond won in 29.03, the fastest time of the event so far. De Lahdedah won the first heat on night 2, a race that saw the end of Knockeen Dazzler's challenge. Bombay Pat won again and Ballinabola Jim set a time of 29.07 beating Callaway Knegare by 9½ lengths.

The third round saw Bockos Diamond broke the track record and further his claims for the title. The black dog trained by Graham Holland set a time of 28.94, breaking Pestana's four year record. Undulation won in 29.16 and Cheap Sandwiches in 29.18.

Bombay Pat made if four from four by winning a strong first quarter-final, Ballinabola Jim and March On Freddie both qualified by English Derby champion De Lahdedah went out. A Lucky Julie pipped Cheap Sandwiches in heat 2 before Carrick Aldo claimed the third heat. The last race featured Bockos Diamond, who won easily from Callaway Knegare.

In the first semi-final Bockos Diamond equalled his own track record with another faultless display from Callaway Knegare and A Lucky Julie. The three eliminated were Bombay Pat, Carrick Also and Seven Beach. The second heat went to Cheap Sandwiches from Singalong Dolly and Boylesports Bob, with Da Bold Falcon, March On Freddie and Ballinabola Jim missing out on a Derby final place.

== See also ==
- 2024 UK & Ireland Greyhound Racing Year
