= Blue Riband (greyhounds) =

Greyhound racing competition

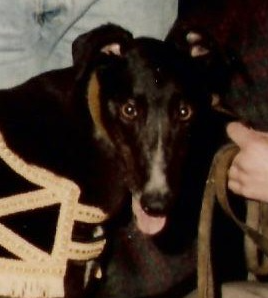
- Dempsey Duke, winner in 1992
- Class: Category 1
- Location: Towcester Stadium
- Inaugurated: 1981
- Sponsor: Greyhound Racing UK

Race information
- Distance: 500 metres
- Surface: Sand
- Purse: £10,000 (winner)

The Blue Riband is a greyhound racing competition held annually at Towcester Stadium.

== History ==
It was inaugurated in 1981 at Wembley Stadium as a replacement competition for the Wembley Spring Cup which ended in 1980.

Following the end of the Wembley Greyhounds the race transferred to Greyhound Racing Association (GRA) sister track Hall Green Stadium in 1999. The race was discontinued by the GRA after the 2012 running despite being a category one race.

In 2021, the race returned under the promotion of Kevin Boothby at Towcester Greyhound Stadium and has retained a category 1 status since.

== Venues & distances ==
- 1981–1998 (Wembley, 490 metres)
- 1999–2012 (Hall Green, 480 metres)
- 2021–2025 (Towcester, 500 metres)

== Sponsors ==
- 1988–1998 (Wendy Fair Markets)
- 1999–2009 (William Hill)
- 2010–2010 (Stan James bookmakers)
- 2011–2011 (Betfair)
- 2012–2012 (Ladbrokes)
- 2021–2021 (TRC Health & Hygiene)
- 2022–2022 (Premarket Pets)
- 2023–2024 (Stadium Bookmakers)
- 2025–2025 (Greyhound Racing UK)

== Winners ==
Year	Winner	Breeding	Trainer	Time	SP	Notes/ref
1981	Arfur Mo	Carhumore Speech - Monalee Roman	John Honeysett (Crayford)	29.47	20/1	
1982	Master Darby	Sole Aim - Aglish Pilgrim	Jerry Fisher (Reading)	29.88	7/2	
1983	Cross Times	Violet Hall - Full Circle	Jerry Fisher (Reading)	30.01	7/2	
1984	Living Trail	Ivy Hall Solo - Elimron	John Honeysett (Wembley)	29.69	50/1	
1985	Lulus Hero	Sail On II - Lulus Loner	Gunner Smith (Brighton)	29.23	3/1	
1986	Fearless Champ	Special Account - Sarahs Bunny	Geoff De Mulder (Oxford)	29.04	8/11f	
1987	Sambuca	Pat Seamur - Lyons Flora	Gunner Smith (Brighton)	29.08	16/1	
1988	Pike Alert	Security Alert - PC Breda	Tom Foster (Wimbledon)	29.18	7/1	
1989	Ring Slippy	I'm Slippy - Westpark Chill	Derek Millen (Canterbury)	29.64	3/1	
1990	Westmead Harry	Fearless Champ - Westmead Move	Nick Savva (Milton Keynes)	29.09	7/4f	
1991	Wuncross	Double Creamery Cross - Wuncoat	Derek Knight (Hove)	29.02	33/1	
1992	Dempsey Duke	Shanagarry Duke - Willowbrook Peg	Terry Kibble (Bristol)	28.87	2/1jf	
1993	Hypnotic Stag	Greenpark Fox - Sister Moonshine	John Coleman (Walthamstow)	28.85	8/13f	
1994	Ardilaun Bridge	Adraville Bridge - Cecilia One	Chris Duggan (Walthamstow)	29.03	11/10f	
1995	Heres Seanie	Ardfert Sean - Mindys Miracle	Pat Ryan (Perry Barr)	28.85	2/7f	
1996	Quick Tune	Farloe Melody - Lady Be Fast	Gordon Hodson (Hove)	29.75	5/1	
1997	Blue Murlen	Murlens Abbey - Lovely Lovely	Mick Smith (Private)	29.07	2/7f	
1998	He Knows	Slaneyside Hare - I Know You	Barrie Draper (Sheffield)	29.22	11/4	
1999	Droopys Merson	Frightful Flash - Lemon Miss	Nick Savva (Milton Keynes)	28.53	1/1f	
2000	Vintage Cleaner	Vintage Prince – Treasure Beo	John McGee Sr. (Private)	28.20	9/4	Track record
2001	Hollinwood Chief	Night Trooper – Hollinwood Major	Mick Clarke (Private)	28.51	7/4f	
2002	Hollinwood Wiz	Night Trooper – Hollinwood Major	Mick Clarke (Private)	28.45	8/1	
2003	Farloe Verdict	Droopys Vieri – She Knew	Charlie Lister (Private)	28.09	5/2	Track record
2004	Droopys Oasis	Larkhill Jo – Droopys Graf	Brian Clemenson (Hove)	28.28	5/4f	
2005	Tuttles Ronaldo	Droopys Kewell – By The Numbers	Frank Wright (Coventry)	28.26	7/1	
2006	Westmead Joe	Larkhill Jo – Mega Delight	Nick Savva (Private)	28.58	13/8f	
2007	Iceman Vader	Top Honcho – Barrow Tune	Lance Burford (Coventry)	28.56	4/1	
2008	Farloe Reason	Droopys Maldini – Farloe Oyster	Charlie Lister (Private)	28.24	1/2f	
2009	Blonde Fern	Hondo Black – Returned Fire	Tony Dean (Private)	28.06	4/1	
2010	Eye Onthe Storm	Droopys Vieri – Bower Louise	Mark Wallis (Yarmouth)	28.02	8/13f	Track record
2011	Express Shuttle	Kiowa Sweet Trey – Express Mist	Chris Allsopp (Monmore)	28.42	11/8f	
2012	Young Sid	Killahan Panther – Marwood Review	Paul Young (Romford)	28.31	6/4f	
2013 to 2020 not held
2021	Kilara Lion	Droopys Jet – Kilara Lizzie	Patrick Janssens (Towcester)	29.73	11/8f	
2022	Ivy Hill Skyhigh	Taylors Sky – Yahoo Perlena	Mark Wallis (Monmore)	29.91	7/1	
2023	Hopes Paddington	Good News – Charity Anna	Nathan Hunt (Romford)	29.15	9/4	
2024	Signet Goofy	Magical Bale – Forest Natalee	John Mullins (Towcester)	29.39	9/2	
2025	Table Toppers	Droopys Sydney – Dolce Vita	Mark Wallis (Private)	28.72	9/4f	
