= Kinsley Greyhound Stadium =

Greyhound racing stadium in England

Coordinates: 53°37′33.51″N 1°22′04.24″W

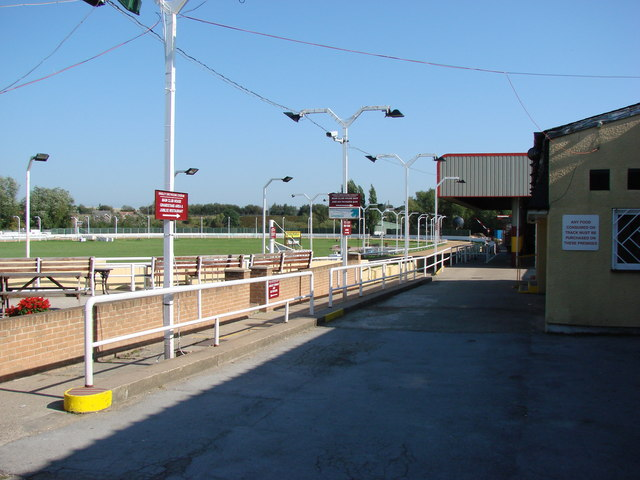
- A view of the home straight in 2006
- Interactive map of Kinsley Greyhound Stadium
- Full name: Kinsley Greyhound Stadium
- Location: Kinsley, West Yorkshire, England
- Capacity: 3,000
- Surface: Sand
- Field size: 385m

Construction
- Opened: 1939
- Renovated: 1985

Tenant
- Greyhound racing

Website
- Official website

Kinsley Greyhound Stadium is a Greyhound Board of Great Britain regulated greyhound racing stadium situated on Wakefield Road in Kinsley, West Yorkshire, England.

== Racing ==
Racing takes place four times a week with ARC meetings on Monday, Wednesday, Friday and also on Sunday evenings. The circumference of the track at Kinsley is 385 metres. The facilities include a restaurant with seating for 150 people.

== History ==
The Kinsley greyhound track is situated between Leeds and Doncaster and was built and opened in 1939. The track was independent (also known as a flapping track) and served the local mining village. After the war the track could accommodate a maximum of 3,500 spectators.

In 1985 John Curran and Keith Murrell took over the running of the track and invested into the stadium by improving the facilities. Distances were changed to 100, 260, 330, 460 & 630 metres, an 'Inside Sumner' hare was put in and a competition was introduced called the Kinsley Greyhound Derby. The race offered £20,000 eclipsing many of the top National Greyhound Racing Club events at the time. A computer totalisator was added and twelve bookmakers stood on course. There were 48 kennels on site and the Jubilee restaurant offered room for 160 covers. The track was beginning to show all the hallmarks of a regulated circuit and even had a thriving social club open all week.

Despite the significant stature of the track it was not until 2000 that the decision was finally taken to apply for an NGRC licence which was granted. The new distances were 275, 450, 485 and 656 metres. Keith Murrell acted as Racing Manager until Craig Hunt was brought in to take up the role. The first meeting was on 15 January 2000 and racing was on Tuesday, Friday and Saturday evenings. Distances have since changed on two more occasions and a Swaffham hare has been introduced.

In 2008, it was voted "Best National Greyhound Racing Club greyhound stadium in the north" by the British Greyhound Racing Board.

In 2010, the track was rewarded by being allocated the 2010 Television Trophy, an event won by Midway Skipper and in 2011 the Gymcrack was introduced after it switched from Hall Green Stadium. The first winner was Nick Colton's Taranis Rex, a black and white dog that also broke the track record in the process. In 2018 Brinkleys Poet won the event and set a new track record time by beating the previous best time of 27.02 by Droopys Trapeze.

In 2018, the stadium signed a deal with ARC to race a Tuesday and Friday matinée meeting and a Sunday afternoon meeting every week and a new five-year contract extension was agreed to run from January 2025.

== Competitions ==
Gymcrack

== Track records ==
=== Current ===
Metres	Greyhound	Time (sec)	Date	Notes
268	Roxholme Hat	15.79	22 April 2018	
462	Brinkleys Poet	26.95	22 April 2018	Gymcrack final
650	Geelo Bullet	39.68	16 May 2017	
844	Roxholme Magic	51.95	20 April 2016	

=== Former ===
Extended content

Metres	Greyhound	Time (sec)	Date	Notes
268	Precious Moments	16.22	15 June 2010	
268	Johnnys Way	16.02	19 July 2011	
268	Roxholme Hat	15.83	15 April 2018	
270	Pearses Skip	16.61	20 December 2003	
270	Troy Bustino	16.39	17 January 2004	
270	Lundhill Dan	16.33	13 March 2004	
270	Larkhill Castle	16.22	11 April 2004	
270	Droopys Ernest	16.20	5 October 2004	
270	Farloe Kinrush	16.08	12 October 2004	
270	Farloe Kinrush	16.05	16 July 2005	
270	Ballyneale Cash	16.05	8 July 2006	
270	Russanda Droopy	16.32	20 April 2010	
275	Niamh Knows	16.64	3 August 2002	
450	Farloe Careless	27.80	21 March 2000	
450	Frankie My Son	27.23	22 March 2003	
462	Molly Marina	27.77	15 May 2010	
462	Taranis Rex	27.45	3 July 2011	Gymcrack heats
462	Taranis Rex	27.21	19 July 2011	Gymcrack final
462	Freds Champ	27.36	19 July 2011	
462	Fionn	27.37	19 July 2011	
462	Jaytee Youngy	27.10	10 June 2012	
465	Frankie My Son	28.33	27 December 2003	
465	Ballyveelish Ace	28.11	10 January 2004	
465	Combridge Snowy	28.04	24 January 2004	
465	Goreport Bay	27.71	11 April 2004	
465	Drumwood Rebel	27.66	14 May 2005	
465	Drumwood Rebel	27.61	26 November 2005	
485	Ten Simple Minds	28.85	27 July 2002	
650	Patterdale Rafa	40.78	2 May 2010	
650	Nifty Crash	40.39	27 June 2010	
650	Nyla Fantasy	39.72	26 June 2012	
655	Honchos Cleo	40.99	24 January 2004	
655	Star Model	40.39	11 April 2004	
655	Weeton Warrior	40.37	12 October 2004	
655	Lundhill Flash	40.32	19 March 2005	
655	Welers Pet	40.26	6 September 2005	
656	Frisby Fassan	41.33	25 September 2001	
656	Marthas Pipe	40.68	3 September 2002	
844	Killishin Masai	53.46	15 May 2010	
844	Midway Skipper	52.91	15 June 2010	TV Trophy final
844	Bubbly Capel	52.54	26 June 2012	
844	King Kane	52.44	22 April 2015	
850	Baliff Queen	53.63	11 April 2004	
850	Top Plan	53.18	7 November 2004	
866	Spenwood Wizard	53.32	28 May 000	
