= Steel City Cup =

British greyhoud racing competition

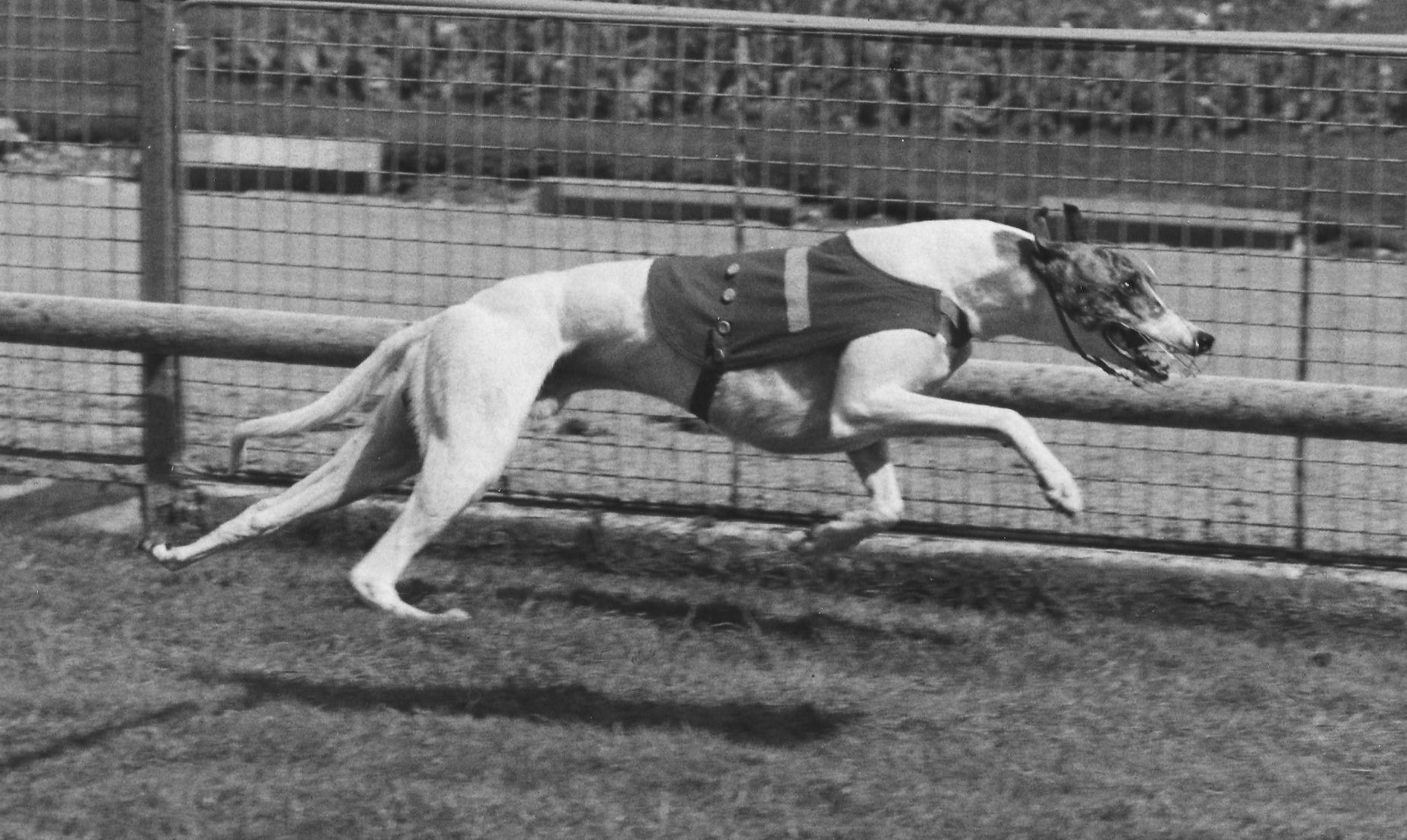
- Desert Pilot, 1980 champion
- Class: Category 1
- Location: Sheffield
- Inaugurated: 1970
- Sponsor: BresBet

Race information
- Distance: 500 metres
- Surface: Sand
- Purse: £11,500 (winner)

The Steel City Cup is a greyhound racing competition held annually at Owlerton Stadium in Sheffield.

It was inaugurated in 1970.

== Venues and distances ==
- 1970-present (Sheffield, 500m)

== Sponsors ==
- 1994–2009 (William Hill)
- 2010–2010 (Betfair)
- 2011–2017 (Betfred)
- 2018–2018 (Greyhound Media Group)
- 2019–2019 (Racing Post Greyhound TV)
- 2021–2025 (BresBet)

== Past winners ==
| Year | Winner | Breeding | Trainer | Time (sec) | SP | Notes/ref |
|---|---|---|---|---|---|---|
| 1970 | Westpark Toots | Myross Again - Westmead Grace | Stan Mitchell (Belle Vue) | 30.66 | | |
| 1971 | Toremore Flash | Forward Flash - Toremore Lass | Jack Brennan (Sheffield) | 31.20 | 9/4 | |
| 1972 | Kudas Honour | Kilbeg Kuda - Premier Honour | Jack Brennan (Sheffield) | 29.88 | 7/4jf | Track record |
| 1973 | Priory Hi | Maryville Hi - Miss Hi Land | Pen Andrews (Private) | 30.42 | 4/7f | |
| 1974 | Gone The Time | Lisamote Precept - Sallys Style | Joe Kelly (Leeds) | 30.26 | 4/1 | |
| 1975 | Company Cash | Fantastic Prince - Cash Princess | Joe Kelly (Leeds) | 29.65 | 11/4 | |
| 1976 | Tilbrook Herald | Houghton Herald - Midnight Tour | Barbara Tompkins (Bletchley) | 29.21 | 7/4 | Track record |
| 1977 | Gan On Paddy | Laurdella Fun - Midi Robin | Paddy Milligan (Private) | 29.58 | 4/5f | |
| 1978 | Westmead Manor | Mels Pupil - Westmead Silver | Natalie Savva (Bletchley) | 30.08 | 5/1 | |
| 1979 | Burniston Jet | Jimsun - Davids Black | Jim Hookway (Sheffield) | 29.99 | 3/1 | |
| 1980 | Desert Pilot | Tain Mor - Dark Hostess | Geoff De Mulder (Private) | 29.38 | 2/13f | Track record |
| 1981 | Heres Gay | Tullig Rambler- Lassie Get Lost | Geoff De Mulder (Coventry) | 29.58 | 1/1f | |
| 1982 | Fire Dragon | Ivy Hall Solo - Kisses For Me | Joe Booth (Private) | 30.14 | 1/1f | |
| 1983 | Caribbean Spice | Mulcair Rocket - Caribbean Bird | Pete Beaumont (Sheffield) | 30.29 | 6/4f | |
| 1986 | Well Rigged | Ceili Band - Sole Investment | Rita Hayward (Nottingham) | 30.59 | 5/4f | |
| 1987 | Hollyhill Way | Eagles Nest - Hollyhill Hume | Maurice Buckland (Hall Green) | 30.29 | 4/1 | |
| 1988 | Lyons Turbo | Evelyn Turbo - Miss Time Up | Charlie Lister OBE (Private) | 30.29 | 5/6f | |
| 1989 | Nip And Tuck | Rip Sandy - Sober Kate | Dave Hopper (Sheffield) | 29.75 | 3/1 | |
| 1990 | Kilcannon Bullet | Odell Supreme - Murlens Toe | John Coleman (Walthamstow) | 29.56 | 8/11f | |
| 1991 | Woodhill Echo | Game Ball - Slaneyside Speed | Dawn Milligan (Private) | 29.59 | 2/1f | |
| 1992 | Gulleen Cove | Manorville Sand - Seaway Linda | Dave Conway (Private) | 29.92 | 14/1 | |
| 1993 | Gulleen Cove | Manorville Sand - Seaway Linda | Dave Conway (Private) | 29.53 | 8/1 | |
| 1994 | Anhid Breeze | Adraville Bridge - Anhid Cross | Dave Conway (Private) | 29.45 | 6/1 | |
| 1995 | Justright Melody | Farloe Melody - Farloe Mineola | Tom Robinson (Private) | 29.36 | 7/4f | |
| 1996 | Andys Surprise | Larryandy - Midi Moral | Dave Conway (Private) | 29.47 | 7/2 | |
| 1997 | Frisby Free | Fortunate Man - Geal Gayo Sandie | Geoff De Mulder (Hall Green) | 29.77 | 14/1 | |
| 1998 | Anhid Knight | Adraville Bridge - Anhid Cross | Dave Conway (Sheffield) | 29.68 | 9/4 | |
| 1999 | Knockanroe Rover | Mountleader Peer - Seanos Miss | Paul Stringer (Private) | 29.35 | 2/1 | |
| 2000 | Farloe Cobbler | Cry Dalcash - Farloe Post | Barrie Draper (Sheffield) | 29.53 | 7/4f | |
| 2001 | Jerrys Surprise | Toms The Best - Audi Turbo | Barry Picton (Hall Green) | 29.38 | 7/1 | |
| 2002 | Droopys Rhys | Jamaican Hero - High Knight | Ted Soppitt (Private) | 29.27 | 5/6f | |
| 2003 | Starofthebill | Split The Bill - Hundred Percent | Jane Houfton (Sheffield) | 29.60 | 12/1 | |
| 2004 | Rhincrew Santini | Come on Ranger - Rhincrew Claudia | Elaine Parker (Sheffield) | 29.49 | 9/4 | |
| 2005 | Bell Legend | Droopys Vieri - Kylies Sonia | Mark Wallis (Walthamstow) | 29.81 | 8/15f | |
| 2006 | Womble | Toms The Best - Westmead Josie | Brian Rumney (Sheffield) | 29.39 | 25/1 | |
| 2007 | Boherna on Air | Kiowa Sweet Trey - Free To Air | Barrie Draper (Sheffield) | 29.29 | 5/4jf | |
| 2008 | Blonde Dino | Daves Mentor - Charquest | John Mullins (Yarmouth) | 29.04 | 8/11f | |
| 2009 | Bandicoot Tipoki | Crash-Bandicoot Lola | Charlie Lister OBE (Private) | 28.67 | 1/1f | |
| 2010 | Mill Pinpoint | Hallucinate-Saleen Chloe | Kelly Macari (Sunderland) | 28.96 | 5/4f | |
| 2011 | Mill Bling Bling | Bombastic Shiraz – Respect For Lee | Kelly Macari (Sunderland) | 28.74 | 2/1jf | |
| 2012 | Skywalker Louie | Top Honcho – Synone Starlight | Elaine Parker (Sheffield) | 28.77 | 10/1 | |
| 2013 | Pay Freeze | Ace Hi Rumble – Ballinclare Dime | Elaine Parker (Sheffield) | 28.57 | 6/4f | |
| 2014 | Underground Paul | Ace Hi Rumble – Kerryroad Lucy | Paul Young (Romford) | 28.75 | 6/1 | |
| 2015 | Minglers Thunder | Archaton Pine – Minglers Impact | Jimmy Wright (Newcastle) | 28.67 | 13/8f | |
| 2016 | Pinpoint Den | Zero Ten - Allen Harbour | Kelly Macari (Sunderland) | 28.56 | 7/2 | |
| 2017 | Tynwald Baz | Droopys Jet - Bish Bash Bosh | Lawrence Tuffin (Nottingham) | 28.79 | 6/4f | |
| 2018 | Roxholme Nidge | Droopys Nidge - Silver Dollar | Hayley Keightley (Doncaster) | 28.53 | 4/1 | |
| 2019 | Roxholme Nidge | Droopys Nidge – Silver Dollar | Hayley Keightley (Doncaster) | 28.53 | 11/4 | |
| 2020 | Headford Ranger | Tullymurry Act – Headford Maura | Kevin Hutton (Monmore) | 28.63 | 11/8f | |
| 2021 | Forest Gold | Dorotas Wildcat – Forest Dot | Kevin Hutton (Towcester) | 28.71 | 3/1 | |
| 2022 | Signet Goofy | Magical Bale – Forest Natalee | John Mullins (Towcester) | 28.76 | 2/1 | |
| 2023 | Swift Iconic | Droopys Roddick – Swift Biology | John Mullins (Towcester) | 28.68 | 7/2 | |
| 2024 | Wicky Ned | Droopys Sydney – Ballycowen Lucy | James Fenwick (Newcastle) | 28.96 | 8/11f | |
| 2025 | Romeo Steel | Ballymac Cashout – Fabulous Amalfi | Patrick Janssens (Towcester) | 28.36 | 10/11f | |
| 2026 | Adelinesfirstdog | Dromana Bucko – Ellie O | Richie Taberner (Monmore) | 28.86 | 22/1 | |
