= Three Steps to Victory =

UK Greyhound racing competition

- Class: Category 1
- Location: Sheffield
- Inaugurated: 2003
- Sponsor: Time Greyhound Nutrition

Race information
- Distance: three distances
- Surface: Sand
- Purse: £10,000 (winner)

The Three Steps to Victory is a greyhound racing competition held annually at Owlerton Stadium in Sheffield.

It was inaugurated in 2003 and is unique in the racing calendar because it consists of different race distances. In 2019, Gain Nutrition took over the sponsorship of the event. Gain Nutrition became Time Greyhound Nutrition in 2023.

== Venues and distances ==
- 2003–2004 (Sheffield 280, 480, 500m)
- 2010–2025 (Sheffield 480, 500, 660m)

== Sponsors ==
- 2010–2010 (Molson Coors Brewing Company)
- 2011–2011 (Carling)
- 2014–2014 (Coors Light)
- 2015–2016 (Pinpoint Recruitment)
- 2017–2017 (Molson Coors Brewing Company)
- 2018–2018 (Greyhound Media Group (GMG))
- 2019–2025 (Gain Nutrition/Time Greyhound Nutrition)

== Past winners ==
Year	Winner	Breeding	Trainer	Time (sec)	SP	Ref/notes
2003	Tucks Mein	Top Honcho – Borna Best	Elaine Parker (Sheffield)	29.12	11/4f	
2004	Farloe Hack	Staplers Jo – Farloe Dingle	Barrie Draper (Sheffield)	29.61	7/2	
2010	Head Iton Jason	Westmead Hawk – Droopys Grisham	Chris Allsopp (Monmore)	39.25	7/2	
2011	Kilmore Say Go	Brett Lee – Coolavanny Kate	Matt Dartnall (Swindon)	39.49	7/2	
2012	Clerihan Gold	Goldmine Ramble – Goldmine Sally	John Sharp (Private)	40.16	25/1	
2013	Hather George	Hondo Black – Culmore Gift	Charlie Lister OBE (Private)	38.95	9/2	
2014	Ballymac Eske	Burnpark Champ – Ballymac Penske	Barrie Draper (Sheffield)	38.61	8/11f	Track record
2015	Farneys Cookie	Tullymurry Act – Tullymurry Mona	Kevin Boon (Private)	39.29	3/1	
2016	Patchys Kerry	Blackstone Gene – Droopys Stosur	Mark Wallis (Towcester)	38.77	2/5f	
2017	Geelo Sapphire	Ace Hi Rumble – Droopys Raeh	Carl Perry (Sheffield)	38.86	7/1	
2018	Swift Hansel	Godsend – Swift Approach	Anna Thompson (Nottingham)	39.42	9/4	
2019	Bull Run Button	Ballymac Eske – Tullowmac Java	Barrie Draper (Sheffield)	39.09	11/8f	
2020	Roxholme Kristof	Ballymac Eske – Badminton Baby	Hayley Keightley (Private)	38.57	4/9f	
2021	Savana Eruption	Droopys Jet – Volcano	Diane Henry (Towcester)	39.14	15/8f	
2022	Coolavanny Aunty	Droopys Sydney – Yahoo Katie	Angela Harrison (Newcastle)	38.78	13/8f	
2023	Distant Emma	Droopys Sydney – Distant Lucy	Barrie Draper (Sheffield)	38.95	11/10f	
2024	Queen Georgia	Droopys Sydney – Queen Jessiej	Liz McNair (Central Park)	38.88	5/4f	
2025	Wicky Ned	Droopys Sydney – Ballycowen Lucy	Jimmy Fenwick (Newcastle)	38.98	7/4	
