= Prestige (greyhounds) =

UK greyhound racing competition

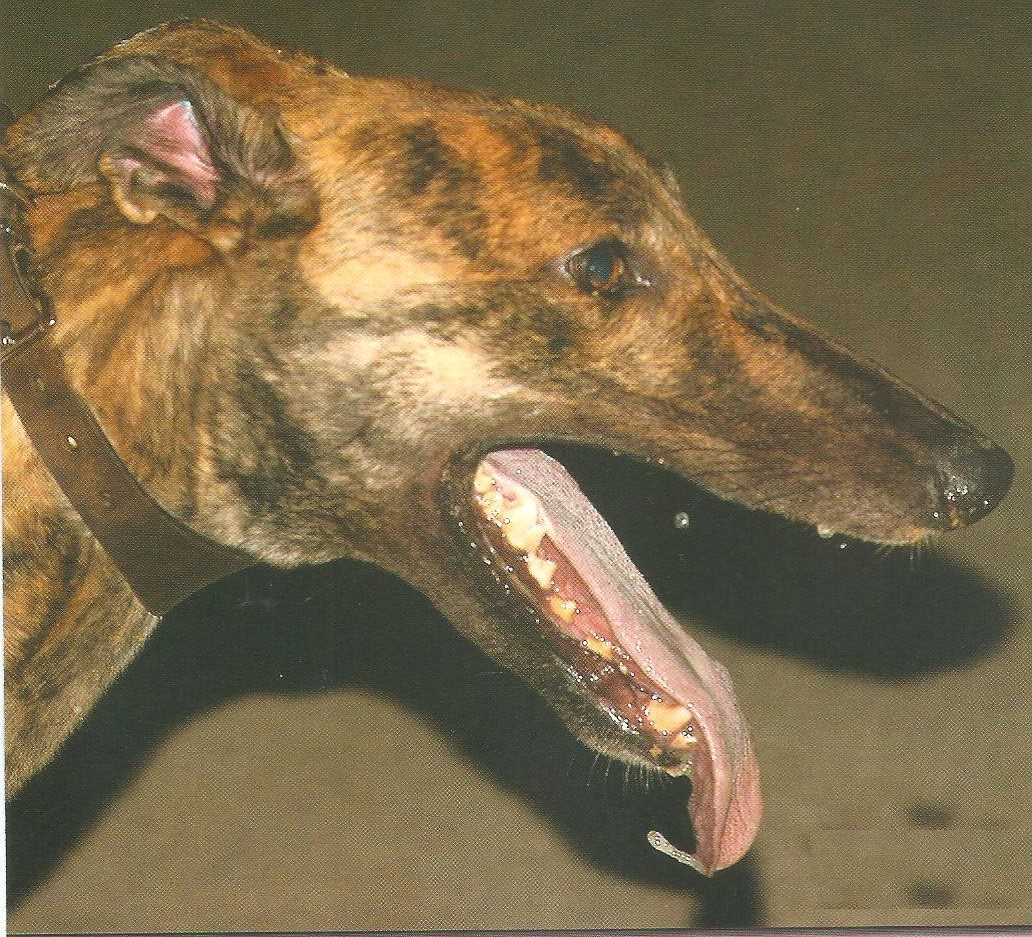
- 2003 winner Maxie Rumble
- Location: Hall Green Stadium
- Inaugurated: 2003
- Final run: 2017

Race information
- Distance: 645 metres
- Surface: Sand

The Prestige is a former greyhound racing competition that was held annually at Hall Green Stadium in Birmingham, England, from 2003 to 2017. The event discontinued following the closure of Hall Green Stadium in July 2017.

== Venues and distances ==
- 2003–2017 (Hall Green 645m)

== Sponsors ==
- 2003–2006 William Hill
- 2007–2008 Betdirect
- 2009–2009 William Hill
- 2010–2011 Betfair
- 2012–2013 Local Parking Security Ltd
- 2014–2015 Partex Marking Systems
- 2017–2017 Greyhound Media Group

== Past winners ==
Year	Winner	Breeding	Trainer	Time	SP
2003	Maxie Rumble	Smooth Rumble - Minnies Sparkler	John Mullins (Walthamstow)	39.53	8-13f
2004	Jack Spark	Minnies Sparkler - Minnies Sparkler	John Mullins (Walthamstow)	39.79	7-4f
2005	Solid Money	Droopys Vieri - Town Band	Derek Knight (Hove)	39.62	6-4
2006	Westmead Olivia	Larkhill Jo - Mega Delight	Nick Savva (Private)	39.49	13-2
2007	Larkhill Bird	Stately Bird - Elle's Amy	Michael Walsh (Pelaw Grange)	39.60	6-4f
2008	Tuftys Pearletta	True Honcho - Pearletta	Laurence Tuffin (Nottingham)	39.78	6-1
2009	Hawks Dilemma	Westmead Hawk - Droopys Seville	Seamus Cahill (Wimbledon)	39.94	7-1
2010	Lorrys Options	Westmead Hawk - Droopys Seville	Dean Childs (Private)	39.95	6-5f
2011	Blue Bee	Hondo Black - Blue Honey	Matt Dartnall (Swindon)	39.90	11-8f
2012	Express Trend	Kiowa Sweet Trey – Express Mist	Liz McNair (Private)	39.83	7-1
2014	Scala Dromin	Shaneboy Lee – Keoghs Lass	Stuart Buckland (Hall Green)	40.66	7-1
2015	Billys Bullet	Ace Hi Rumble – Droopys Start	Mark Wallis (Towcester)	39.07	7-4f
2016	Deanridge Pennys	Kinloch Brae – Doodle Doo	John Mullins (Yarmouth)	39.87	8-1
2017	Rubys Razzle	Razldazl George - Swift Eva	Mark Wallis (Towcester)	39.31	3-1
