= Kinsley, West Yorkshire =

Village in West Yorkshire, England

Coordinates: 53°37′34″N 1°22′12″W

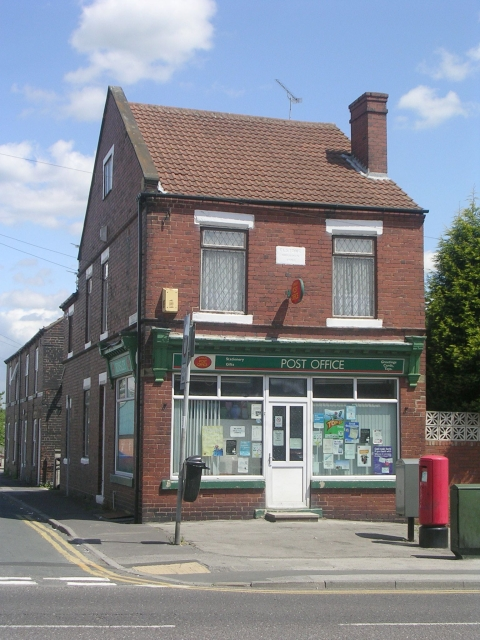
Kinsley post office, which later closed.

Kinsley is a village in the civil parish of Hemsworth and the City of Wakefield district of West Yorkshire, England.

Kinsley is a rural, ex-mining village. Its neighbouring villages are Fitzwilliam to the north, to which it is conjoined, and Hemsworth to the south-east.

The village is on the B6273 Wakefield Road, approximately 8 miles (13 km) from Wakefield to the north-west, 6 miles (10 km) to Pontefract to the north and 8 miles (13 km) to Barnsley to the south-west. The M1 motorway is 8 miles (13 km) to the west and the M62 6 miles (10 km) to the north. A railway station at Fitzwilliam gives access to Wakefield, Leeds, Doncaster, Meadowhall Interchange and Sheffield.

== History ==
Historically Kinsley is part of the West Riding of Yorkshire in the Wapentake of Staincross. The Wapentake almost corresponds with the current Barnsley Metropolitan Area, although a few settlements and townships within the Staincross Wapentake such as Kinsley were put outside the Metropolitan Borough of Barnsley and now lie within the current West Yorkshire Metropolitan Area since April 1974.

The village is probably best known for the Kinsley evictions of 15 August 1905, when 25 families were evicted from their homes by police during a strike at Hemsworth Colliery. They were made temporarily homeless and eventually set up camp at Outwood Hall farm in Outwood.

== Landmarks ==
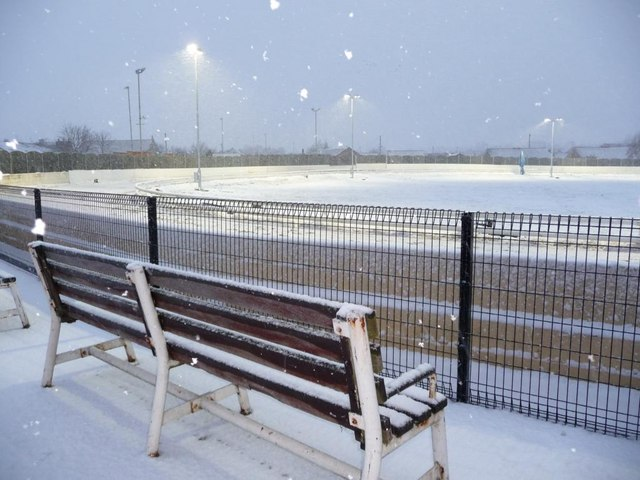
Kinsley Greyhound Stadium

Kinsley Greyhound Stadium is at the centre of the village on Wakefield Road.

To the south of the greyhound stadium and Hoyle Mill Road, is Hemsworth Water Park and Playworld, which has two lakes: the larger lake is used for pedalo rides and has sandy beaches; the smaller lake is in a more secluded area which attracts wildlife. Both lakes are stocked for fishing. Grassed areas provide for picnics and games, contain an outdoor adventure playground for children, and a miniature railway.

At the south of the Water Park is Vale Head Park, with 9-hole golf course, tennis court, crazy golf and play park facilities.

== Education ==
Education in Kinsley is provided by Kinsley J&I School on the Wakefield Road. Hemsworth Arts and Community Academy in the neighbouring village of Hemsworth is the secondary school for 11- to 16- and 16- to 19-year-olds.

In December 2016, three cleaners at Kinsley J&I School were sacked after striking in protest at outsourcing. The sacking was condemned by Labour Party leader Jeremy Corbyn.
