= Gymcrack =

British greyhound competition

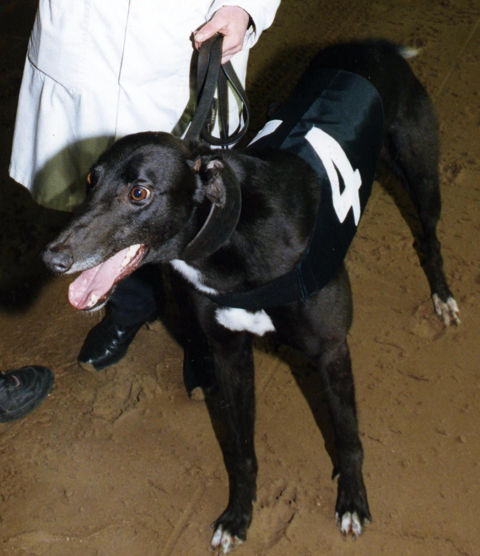
- Night Trooper was the 1996 champion
- Class: Category 1
- Location: Owlerton Stadium
- Inaugurated: 1994
- Sponsor: BresBet

Race information
- Distance: 500 metres
- Surface: Sand
- Qualification: Juveniles only (15-24 months old)
- Purse: £17,500 (winner)

The Gymcrack is a category 1 greyhound competition held at Owlerton Stadium.

== History ==
Initially run at Hackney Wick Stadium in 1994 the race was discontinued in the mid 1996, despite winners such as Moral Standards, Night Trooper and Staplers Jo. It was re-introduced in 2000 at Hall Green Stadium but switched to Kinsley in 2011.

The competition has grown in stature since 2000 and is competed for by puppies (greyhounds over 15 months old but under two years of age). In 2017, the race was won by an Irish entry for the first time but the 2019 event was in danger of being cancelled following problems over securing a sponsor.

In 2018, Brinkleys Poet broke the Kinsley track record winning the final.

In 2024, the event switched Owlerton Stadium and regained category 1 status, with a first prize of £17,500.

== Venues & Distances ==
- 1994–1994 (Hackney, 484m)
- 1995–1995 (Hackney, 442m)
- 1996–1996 (Hackney, 480m)
- 2000–2010 (Hall Green, 480m)
- 2011–2023 (Kinsley, 462m)
- 2024–2025 (Sheffield, 500m)

== Sponsors ==
- 1994–1995 (John Power)
- 2005–2009 (Skybet)
- 2010–2010 (Newton Abbot Racecourse)
- 2011–2018 (Betfred)
- 2023–2025 (BresBet)

== Past winners ==
Year	Winner	Breeding	Trainer	Time (sec)	SP	Notes/Ref
1994	Moral Standards	Flag Star - No Way Jose	Tony Meek (Hall Green)		7/4f	
1995	Staplers Jo	Dempsey Duke – Perfect Rhythm	Nick Savva (Walthamstow)	26.59	1/8f	
1996	Night Trooper	Portrun Flier – Suir Orla	Nikki Adams (Rye House)	29.48	5/1	
2000	Droopys Woods	Top Honcho – Droopys Fergie	Paul Young (Romford)	28.00	2/1jf	
2001	Reactabond Ace	El Premier – Droopys Kylie	Paul Young (Romford)	28.22	1/1f	
2002	Louis Saha	Toms The Best – Any Chewing Gum	Barrie Draper (Sheffield)	28.26	3/1	
2003	Moynies Cash	Joannestown Cash – Glanamoon	Charlie Lister OBE (Private)	28.45	13/2	
2004	Roman Road	Droopys Vieri – Madam Alright	Andrew O'Flaherty (Stainforth)	28.69	7/4	
2005	Go Commando	Soviet Ferrari – Lady Devika	Mark Wallis (Walthamstow)	28.11	11/4	
2006	Fear Haribo	Larkhill Jo – Yamila Diaz	Carly Philpott (Private)	28.56	5/4f	
2007	Farloe Hurricane	Larkhill Jo – Farloe Oyster	Barrie Draper (Sheffield)	28.41	5/6f	
2008	Mottos Star	Bucks Honcho – Mottos Friend	Charlie Lister (Private)	28.48	3/1	
2009	Droopys Bogart	Droopys Scolari – Droopys Gucci	Liz McNair (Private)	28.09	2/1jf	
2010	Blue Artisan	Droopys Maldini – Poolie Pride	Harry Williams (Sunderland)	28.18	5/4f	
2011	Taranis Rex	Droopys Vieri – Blackstone Kate	Nick Colton (Oxford)/(Swindon)	27.21	1/1f	Track record
2012	Droopys Hope	Ace Hi Rumble – Droopys Darjina	George Oswald (Private)	27.21	5/1	
2013	Young Golden	Premier Fantasy – Final Golden	Paul Young (Romford)	27.45	33/1	
2014	Mill Jolson	Slip The Lark – Sniper Betty	Kelly Macari (Sunderland)	27.88	4/1	
2015	Stay Loose	Kinloch Brae – Cornamaddy Tiny	Elaine Parker (Sheffield)	27.50	5/1	
2016	Droopys Trapeze	Tullymurry Act – Droopys Blossom	Jimmy Wright (Newcastle)	27.23	2/1	
2017	Cometwopass	Ballymac Eske – Zero Two	Peter Cronin (Ireland)	27.18	11/10f	
2018	Brinkleys Poet	Scolari Me Daddy – Kilara Lizzie	Matt Dartnall (Towcester)	26.95	4/7f	Track Record
Not held from 2019 to 2022
2023	Stormy News	Good News – Bonito Fox	Michael Hurst (Private)	27.75	11/10f	
2024	Wicky Ned	Droopys Sydney – Ballycowen Lucy	James Fenwick (Newcastle)	28.51	4/9f	
2025	Elusivenomore	Ballymac Best – Ballymac Ariel	James Fenwick (Newcastle)	29.36	12/1	
