= 2023 Irish Greyhound Derby =

Annual sporting event in Ireland

2023 Boylesports Irish Greyhound Derby
- Location: Shelbourne Park
- Start date: Friday 28 July
- End date: Saturday 2 September
- Competitors: 156
- Total prize money: €300,000 (winner €125,000)

The 2023 Boylesports Irish Greyhound Derby took place during July, August and September 2023, with the final being held on 2 September at Shelbourne Park. The competition was sponsored by BoyleSports and the prize money purse was €300,000, of which €125,000 went to the winner.

The winner was a black dog called The Other Kobe, trained and bred by Jennifer O'Donnell and owned by Mr Brian Clare and Mr David L'Estrange. It was O'Donnell's second consecutive Irish Derby victory, having won the event in 2022 with The Other Kobe's brother Born Warrior. The Other Kobe and Born Warrior were not only the first full siblings to win the Derby but they were also from the same litter.

== Details ==
The first round was held on 28 & 29 July, second round on 4 & 5 August, third round on 12 August, quarter finals on 19 August and semi finals on 26 August.

In the antepost betting three greyhounds headed the market at 10/1; they were Coolavanny Hoffa, Ballinabola Ed and Clona Duke. They were closely followed by Kirby Memorial champion Clonbrien Treaty, Easter Cup champion Swords Rex and Ballymac Marino at 14/1. Other big names to compete were 2023 English Greyhound Derby champion Gaytime Nemo, 2022 English Greyhound Derby champion Romeo Magico, St Leger champion Bobsleigh Dream, Champion Stakes winner Trinity Junior and the recent Dundalk International winner Raha Mofo.

== Quarter finals ==
Heat 1 (Aug 19)
Pos	Name	SP	Time
1st	De Lahdedah	7/4	29.31
2nd	Seven Beach	9/1	29.80
3rd	Raha Mofo	6/1	29.81
4th	Tommys Hewick	11/2	29.88
5th	Garfinney Blaze	40/1	29.90
6th	Scaglietti	6/4f	29.97

Heat 2 (Aug 19)
Pos	Name	SP	Time
1st	Bens Teddy	2/1f	29.39
2nd	Bockos Crystal	9/4	29.70
3rd	Threesixfive	16/1	29.77
4th	Clonbrein Treaty	4/1	29.91
5th	Droopys Nice One	11/1	29.92
6th	Droopys Bro	4/1	30.06

Heat 3 (Aug 19)
Pos	Name	SP	Time
1st	The Other Kobe	5/1	29.15
2nd	Trinity Junior	11/2	29.36
3rd	Coolavanny Hoffa	11/10f	29.46
4th	Mr Chelm	7/2	29.53
5th	Ballymac Marino	6/1	29.67
6th	Dromana Dano	50/1	29.85

Heat 4 (Aug 19)
Pos	Name	SP	Time
1st	Clonroosk Sydney	3/1	29.55
2nd	Well Met	10/3	29.56
3rd	Music Gildeaway	11/1	29.58
4th	Undulation	6/1	29.75
5th	Bobsleigh Dream	6/5f	29.82
6th	Millridge Levi	40/1	30.10

== Semi finals ==
First semi final (Aug 26)
Pos	Name of Greyhound	SP	Time	Trainer
1st	Music Glideaway	5/1	29.32	Guilfoyle
2nd	Well Met	15/8	29.60	Jones
3rd	Threesixfive	11/1	29.63	Phelan
4th	Clonroosk Sydney	8/1	30.02	Harte
5th	Seven Beach	8/1	30.12	O'Donnell
6th	Trinity Junior	7/4f	30.26	Cronin

Second semi final (Aug 26)
Pos	Name of Greyhound	SP	Time	Trainer
1st	The Other Kobe	5/1	29.58	O'Donnell
2nd	Bens Teddy	10/1	29.635	Buckley
3rd	Bockos Crystal	7/1	29.70	Holland
4th	Coolavanny Hoffa	2/1	29.75	O'Donovan
5th	De Lahdedah	6/4f	30.00	Dowling
6th	Raha Mofo	20/1	30.03	Leahy

== Final ==
At Shelbourne Park (over 550 yards):

Position	Greyhound	Breeding	Trap	Sectional	SP	Time	Comment	Trainer
1st	The Other Kobe	Ballymac Best – Mountaylor Queen	2	3.41	3/1	29.11	FAw, ALed	Jennifer O'Donnell
2nd	Bockos Crystal	Droopys Sydney – Vigorous Hilary	5	3.44	4/1	29.14	ChlRunIn, FinWell	Graham Holland
3rd	Bens Teddy	Droopys Sydney – Beechgrove Bell	3	3.53	11/4f	29.21	Imp3, StrFin	Pat Buckley
4th	Threesixfive	Droopys Sydney – Dunquin Anna	4	3.54	28/1	29.42	SAw, ClrRun	Scott Phelan
5th	Well Met	Ballymac Best – Corduff Flame	1	3.51	11/2	29.77	Rls1&2,FcdToCk3	John Jones
6th	Music Glideaway	Newinn Taylor – Glideaway Magic	6	3.46	7/2	29.84	Crd½, RnOn	Patrick Guilfoyle

=== Distances ===
neck, 1, 3, 5, 1

(0.07 sec = one length)

== Competition report ==
The most notable incident in round one was the elimination of Swords Rex and the second round also saw two major shocks, with the eliminations of Gaytime Nemo and Ballinabola Ed. Scaglietti was fastest in the second round with a 29.26 heat win and 2022 runner-up Ballymac Finn was a non runner.

Bobsleigh Dream started round three with a 29.29 win and this was followed by a very fast 29.12 winner in De Lahdedah. Scaglietti won in fine style again but the competition ended for Clona Duke and Romeo Magico.

In the first quarter final De Lahdedah was an easy winner (29.31) in a heat that saw Scaglietti knocked out. Bens Teddy won the next in a time of 29.39, Clonbrien Treaty and Droppys Nice One were both eliminated. The Other Kobe recorded a fast 29.15 to defeat Trinity Junior and Collavanny Hoffa but Ballymac Marino could only manage fifth. The final heat was won by Clonrook Sydney in 29.55 and also saw the elimination of Bobsleigh Dream.

Few would have predicted the remaining 12 greyhounds for the semi finals as many new names lined up attempting to reach the grand final. The trend continued as Music Glideaway, Well Met and Threesixfive finished in the first three places of the first semi final, the trio missed the trouble out of the traps that accounted for Trinity Junior. In the second semi final the shocks continued as The Other Kobe defeated Bens Teddy and Bockos Crystal, while Coolavanny Hoffa, De Lahdedah and Raha Mofo all disappointed and went out.

In the final, The Other Kobe made an impressive start out of the traps and led all the way for a deserved victory, despite a very late challenge by Bockos Crystal. Bens Teddy finished well but had given the leaders too much of a lead, which also applied to Threesixfive. Well Met found a little crowing at the third bend but was beaten at this stage anyway and Music Glideway never got into the race.

== See also ==
- 2023 UK & Ireland Greyhound Racing Year
