= 2024 English Greyhound Derby =

UK greyhound competition

- Location: Towcester Greyhound Stadium
- Start date: 23 May
- End date: 29 June
- Total prize money: £235,000 (final) £175,000 (winner)

The 2024 Greyhound Derby sponsored by Star Sports/TRC, took place during May and June 2024, with the final being held on 29 June 2024 at Towcester Greyhound Stadium.

De Lahdedah won the event, equalling the track record in the final for trainer and breeder Liam Dowling and owners 'The Garsuns Syndicate'. It was the third consecutive English Derby win for the Irish and the fifth winner from the last six editions.

== Format and ante-post betting ==
It was the sixth time that the event was held at Towcester after previously being run there in 2017 to 2018 and 2021 to 2023. The dates of the competition were as follows - first round 23, 24 & 25 May, second round 31 May & 1 June, third round 8 June, quarter finals 15 June, semi-finals 22 June.

There were 193 entries, which included a large contingent of 52 runners from Ireland and the first representation from a Welsh track (Valley Greyhound Stadium) since the closure of Cardiff Greyhounds. In the ante-post betting, Puppy Derby & Olympic winner King Memphis 16/1 and (Pall Mall champion) Links Maverick 16/1 headed the betting. They were closely followed by the leading bitch Queen Joni 18/1, Irish Derby champion The Other Kobe 20/1, De Lahdedah 20/1, Romeo Command 20/1 and King Capaldi 20/1. Others expected to go well were, Signet Goofy, Faypoint Harvey, Jaytee Etienne, Swords Rex and Clonbrien Treaty. Two greyhounds priced at 100/1 were defending champion Gaytime Nemo and 2023 third placed Cochise.

== Quarter finals ==
Heat 1 (15 June, £1,000)
Pos	Name	SP	Time
1st	Churchfield Syd	8/1	29.08
2nd	Droopys Pivotel	14/1	29.34
3rd	Gaytime Nemo	9/2	29.67
4th	Crafty Shivoo	5/4f	29.69
5th	Superfast Gorden	11/4	29.89
6th	Grouchos Duke	8/1	29.90

Heat 2 (15 June, £1,000)
Pos	Name	SP	Time
1st	King Memphis	4/11f	28.65
2nd	Whyaye Man	20/1	29.08
3rd	Ballymac Gizmo	12/1	29.38
4th	Ballymac Finn	7/1	29.43
5th	Hawkfield Abbie	40/1	29.56
6th	Ballinabola Ed	9/2	29.61

Heat 3 (15 June, £1,000)
Pos	Name	SP	Time
1st	Ballymac Slick	5/1	29.12
2nd	The Other Kobe	1/2f	29.22
3rd	Edwards	14/1	29.32
4th	Droopys Doughnut	9/1	29.37
5th	Hawkfield Blue	11/2	29.49
N/R	Swords Rex		

Heat 4 (15 June, £1,000)
Pos	Name	SP	Time
1st	Boylesports Bob	11/4	28.68
2nd	Coss Tokyo	20/1	29.53
3rd	De Lahdedah	8/13f	29.69
4th	Beatties Sparkle	66/1	29.92
5th	Bockos Thunder	12/1	30.31
6th	Cooliogold	5/1	00.00

== Semi finals ==
First Semi-final (22 June, £2,500)
Pos	Name of Greyhound	SP	Time	Trainer
1st	De Lahdedah	11/8f	28.79	Dowling
2nd	Whyaye Man	12/1	29.00	Wallis
3rd	Boylesports Bob	2/1	29.03	Hennessy
4th	Gaytime Nemo	11/4	29.15	Holland
5th	Coss Tokyo	28/1	29.17	Locke
6th	Edwards	18/1	29.44	Janssens

Second Semi-final (22 June, £2,500)
Pos	Name of Greyhound	SP	Time	Trainer
1st	Churchfield Syd	6/1	28.98	Rees
2nd	King Memphis	10/11f	28.99	McNair
3rd	Ballymac Gizmo	7/1	29.11	Dowling
4th	Droopys Pivotel	20/1	29.19	Locke
5th	The Other Kobe	11/4	29.28	Holland
6th	Ballymac Slick	11/1	29.32	Dowling

== Competition review ==
First round

The first round, held on 23 May, saw the recent Maiden Derby winner Jaytee Etienne win the opening heat in 28.85, followed by Irish Oaks champion Crafty Shivoo taking heat 2. The first shock arrived in heat 4 with the elimination of Signet Goofy, while the next heat resulted in the progression of Irish Derby champion The Other Kobe. The eighth heat went to De Lahdedah and King Capaldi finished runner-up in heat 9 before Boylesports Bob impressed in a time of 28.87.

The second evening on 24 May started badly for the McNair camp because Queen Joni found trouble and was eliminated in the race won by Clonbrien Treaty. However, in the very next race McNair's King Memphis broke the track record with a time of 28.58. Hawkfield Blue won heat 13 in 28.82 and Swords Rex claimed heat 16. The expected Irish challenge and success continued with Pat Buckley's Antigua Hawk recording 28.81 in heat 18, followed by a Graham Holland double with Juvenile champion Faypoint Harvey and defending champion Gaytime Nemo.

The final first round heats were held on 25 May and both Links Maverick and Romeo Command were shock eliminations. Four greyhounds set fast times; Barntick Bear impressed winning in 28.68, followed by Glengar Martha 28.75, Ballymac Senan 28.80 and Kings Combs 28.86.

Second round

Graham Holland's Swords Rex got round two underway with a fast 28.75 success and two heats later King Memphis won in 28.78. Holland then had another winner when Gaytime Nemo recorded 28.76 and the Irish challenge continued with a win from behind for Liam Dowling's De Lahdedah, who would become the new favourite for the event after the second round (King Capaldi failed to progress from the same heat). Superfast Gordon recorded 28.71 and Irish Derby champion The Other Kobe provided Holland with a third winner and Ireland with five out of eight on the night.

Pat Buckley's Ballinabola Ed returned to prominence when winning heat 10 on the second night before Antigua Hawk set a time of 28.77 in heat 11. In the very next heat Mark Wallis saw Crafty Shivoo win in 28.59, just one spot outside the new track record.

Third round

Going into the third round 22 of the last 48 runners were Irish and The Other Kobe continued the Irish success with the first heat win, keeping the hopes of an Irish/English Derby double alive. The next three heats all went to British hounds, Droopys Pivotel, Churchfield Syd and Droopys Doughnut. Heat 5 went to Grouchos Duke before Crafty Shivoo won the strongest heat of the round from De Lahdedah and defending champion Gaytime Nemo. Heat 7 went to King Memphis ahead of Ballinabola Ed and Swords Rex before Ballymack Slick ended the night taking only a third heat win for the Irish.

Quarter finals

The quarter finals were an eventful round with Churchfield Syd taking advantage of being a wide seed and avoiding the crowding in heat 1, to win in 29.08 ahead of Droopys Pivotel. Defending champion Gaytime Nemo ran on strongly to deny Crafy Shivoo a place in the semi-final. King Memphis won heat 2 easily in a fast time of 28.65, with Whyaye Man and Ballymac Gizmo also qualifying. Heat 3 was missing Swords Rex but Graham Holland's Irish champion The Other Kobe safely progressed, despite being caught on the line by Ballmac Slick, with Edwards finishing third. The final heat saw another wide seed take advantage when Boylesports Bob missed trouble to win by ten and a half lengths from Coss Tokyo and De Lahdedah.

Semi finals

De Lahdedah won the first semi final with the advantage of the red jacket with Whyaye Man and Boylesports Bob also qualifying for the final. Defending champion Gaytime Nemo just failed to make the decider after leading to the first bend before finishing fourth. Churchfield Syd also had a good draw, as the only wide seed in the second semi final he defeated the strong finishing King Memphis and Ballyamc Gizmo. Irish champion The Other Kobe only managed fifth.

== Final result ==
At Towcester (over 500 metres): Winner £175,000

Pos	Name of Greyhound	Breeding	Trap	Sectional	Race comment	SP	Time	Trainer
1st	De Lahdedah	Lenson Bocko – Ballymac Sarahjo	4	4.09	RlsTMid,EP,Ld2	5/1	28.58 (=TR)	Liam Dowling
2nd	Boylesports Bob	Good News – Roanna Bess	6	4.06	Wide,RanOnWell	9/2	28.79	Paul Hennessy
3rd	Whyaye Man	Droopys Jet – Droopys Megan	1	4.12	Rails,Crd3	14/1	28.85	Mark Wallis
4th	Churchfield Syd	Droopys Sydney – Millbank Jade	5	4.01	MidTW,QAw,LedTo2	11/2	28.87	Richard Rees
5th	Ballymac Gizmo	Ballymac Cooper – Ballymac Arminta	2	4.15	RlsTMid,Crd3	16/1	28.91	Liam Dowling
6th	King Memphis	Droopys Sydney – Queen Beyonce	3	4.21	RlsTMid,MsdBrk	11/10f	29.13	Liz McNair

=== Final distances ===
2½, ¾, head, ½, 2¾ (lengths) 0.08 sec = one length

=== Final report ===
Churchfield Syd broke smartly from the traps to lead but De Lahdedah showed impressive early pace to take the lead at the second bend, the black dog drew clear to equal the track record in 28.58. Boylesports Bob finished strongly to take second place with Whyaye Man also running on well to take third despite being slightly held up at the third bend. Ballymac Gizmo could never find space and finished fifth behind Churchfield Syd who held on for fourth. The favourite King Memphis, who was so consistent in the rounds made an awful start, missing the break completely and struggled to make an impact from the back.

== See also ==
- 2024 UK & Ireland Greyhound Racing Year
