= 2023 English Greyhound Derby =

UK greyhound competition

- Location: Towcester Greyhound Stadium
- Start date: 25 May
- End date: 1 July
- Total prize money: £235,000 (final) £175,000 (winner)

The 2023 Greyhound Derby sponsored by Star Sports/TRC, took place during May, June and July 2023, with the final being held on 1 July 2023 at Towcester Greyhound Stadium. The winner was Gaytime Nemo, trained by Graham Holland. Gaytime Nemo (a black dog) was owned and bred by Brendan O'Connell from Cork and won the first prize of £175,000.

== Format and ante-post betting ==
It was the fifth time that the event was held at Towcester after previously being run there in 2017, 2018, 2021 and 2022. The dates of the competition were as follows - first round 25, 26 & 27 May, second round 2 & 3 June, third round 10 June, quarter finals 17 June, semi finals 24 June.

There were 192 entries, with 30 from Ireland. In the ante post betting Fromposttopillar 8/1 and (Easter Cup champion and the recent track record holder) Swords Rex 10/1 headed the field, closely followed by Juvenile Derby champion Clona Duke 12/1, Irish Derby runner-up Ballymac Finn 14/1 and British Breeders Stakes champion Romeo Command 16/1. Another major contender would be the defending champion Romeo Magico, while Brookside Richie, Warzone Tom, Savana Beau and Lautaro were expected to go well despite big prices.

== Quarter finals ==
Heat 1 (17 June, £1,000)
Pos	Name	SP	Time
1st	Romeo Command	5/4f	29.04
2nd	Burj Khalifa	4/1	29.18
3rd	Savana Beau	8/1	29.43
4th	Hopes Rhino	28/1	30.03
5th	Aero Arran	18/1	30.32
6th	Boylesports Gift	7/4	30.43

Heat 2 (17 June, £1,000)
Pos	Name	SP	Time
1st	Mystical Mario	10/1	29.25
2nd	Clona Duke	6/4f	29.38
3rd	Cochise	10/1	29.56
4th	Signet Otis	16/1	29.59
5th	Ballyhimikin Leo	10/3	29.81
6th	Romeo Hanzo	9/4	29.95

Heat 3 (17 June, £1,000)
Pos	Name	SP	Time
1st	Gaytime Nemo	10/3	28.94
2nd	Ninja Kerry	20/1	29.38
3rd	Jacktavern Bella	6/1	29.40
4th	Brinkleys Magic	7/2	29.61
5th	Drive On Lad	25/1	29.85
6th	Ballymac Marino	1/1f	29.96

Heat 4 (17 June, £1,000)
Pos	Name	SP	Time
1st	Swords Rex	4/9f	28.93
2nd	Romeo Top Gun	12/1	29.22
3rd	Ballymac Finn	9/1	29.61
4th	Fabulous Azurra	7/1	29.69
5th	Distant Podge	6/1	29.88
6th	Untold Zloty	22/1	30.15

== Semi finals ==
First Semi-final (24 June, £2,500)
Pos	Name of Greyhound	SP	Time	Trainer
1st	Clona Duke	9/4jf	28.69 (TR)	Holland
2nd	Gaytime Nemo	11/4	29.07	Holland
3rd	Cochise	20/1	29.10	Rees
4th	Burj Khalifa	9/4jf	29.32	Matthews
5th	Mystical Mario	11/2	29.89	Lambe
6th	Ballymac Finn	10/1	30.05	Dowling

Second Semi-final (24 June, £2,500)
Pos	Name of Greyhound	SP	Time	Trainer
1st	Swords Rex	8/13f	28.76	Holland
2nd	Romeo Command	15/8	29.04	Janssens
3rd	Ninja Kerry	22/1	29.21	Green
4th	Savana Beau	11/1	29.30	Henry
5th	Jacktavern Belle	16/1	29.31	Holland
N/R	Romeo Top Gun			Janssens

== Competition review ==
The first round provided a series of unusual statistics, the first being the fact that with no reserves for the event there were no less than 18 vacant traps and a processional three dog heat and a no race. The chances of an Irish win were once again very strong, with 24 of the 27 starters for Ireland qualifying for the next round and 11 heat winners. The ante post favourite Fromposttopillar was eliminated and Clona Duke set a new track record. Ten greyhounds dipped under 29 seconds and the best times behind Clona Duke were Ballymac Marino (28.76) and Brookside Richie (28.84).

The first 8 heats of the second round saw defending champion Romeo Magico take a second win and dip under 29 seconds, when he won in 28.97. Three other greyhounds (Signet Goofy, Maree Champion and Romeo Command) also claimed second wins. The second night of racing resulted in an impressive performance from Swords Rex, who was only the second of two greyhounds to break 29 seconds in round two (28.95). Another five greyhounds remained undefeated, with Faypoint Susie, Clona Duke, Savana Beau, Cochise, Ballymac Marino all recording race wins. The biggest shock was the elimination of Brookside Richie.

The third round saw the elimination of the defending champion Romeo Magico and a series of uncustomary big distance winners. Swords Rex won by 11½ in 28.93 to start proceedings and this was followed by Brinkleys Magic who won by 7½ ahead of Clona Duke in a very fast 28.79. Romeo Command then won by 8½ in an even faster 28.75 (just 2 spots outside the track record). Normality returned in heat 4 with Ballymac Marino winning and remaining unbeaten and Romeo Hanzo and Distant Podge took the next two heats. The seventh heat was a surprise as Burj Khalifa won at 8/1, with both Signet Goofy and Maree Champion going out. The last heat saw Fabulous Azurra win, with the champion Romeo Magico finishing fourth and outside of the qualifying places.

In the quarter finals six British and six Irish greyhounds made it to the semi finals. The first heat saw favourite Romeo Command lead all the way from a tricky trap 5 draw and remain unbeaten, while Burj Khalifa chased him home and Savana Beau remained on course for a second successive final. Mystical Mario was a shock winner in heat 2, winning for the first time in the competition as he held off Clona Duke and Cochise. Graham Holland's Gaytime Nemo and Jacktavern Bella both qualified in heat 3, split by Ninja Kerry; Nemo recorded a fine win in a time of 28.94, in a heat that saw the demise of Ballymac Marino. Holland then steered a fourth qualifier through, as the competition favourite Swords Rex eased home in 28.93 ahead of Romeo Top Gun and Ballymac Finn.

The first semi final resulted in a Graham Holland trained 1-2 and a track record for Clona Duke. The black dog recorded 28.69 ahead of kennelmate Gaytime Nemo, with Cochise finishing third. The night got even better for Holland when Swords Rex beat the previously undefeated Romeo Command. Ninja Kerry took the one remaining place in the final.

== Final result ==
At Towcester (over 500 metres): Winner £175,000

Pos	Name of Greyhound	Breeding	Trap	Sectional	Race comment	SP	Time	Trainer
1st	Gaytime Nemo	Droopys Sydney – Gaytime Derval	2	4.08	RlsToMid,VQAw,ALed	9/1	28.89	Graham Holland (Ireland)
2nd	Romeo Command	Dorotas Wildcat – Drive On Betsy	3	4.13	MidToRls,EP,A2nd	4/1	29.18	Patrick Janssens (Towcester)
3rd	Cochise	Droopys Sydney – Lemon Stacey	1	4.16	MidToRls,Crd1	14/1	29.41	Richard Rees (Brighton)
4th	Swords Rex	Droopys Sydney – Starry Display	4	4.22	MidToRls,SAw,Crd1	4/5f	29.43	Graham Holland (Ireland)
5th	Clona Duke	Malachi – Coolavanny Pearl	5	4.21	RlsToMid,Crd&FcdW1	11/2	29.71	Graham Holland (Ireland)
6th	Ninja Kerry	Droopys Jet – Ninja Penny	6	4.19	Mid,Crd1	33/1	29.91	Belinda Green (Brighton)

=== Final distances ===
3½, 3, hd, 3½, 2½ (lengths) 0.08 sec = one length

=== Final report ===
Gaytime Nemo make the best break from the traps and his early pace saw him lead all the way, unthreatened from start to finish. Romeo Command (always second) was very slightly impeded at the first and maybe would have got closer to the winner. Cochise had every chance and picked up Swords Rex for third place, the latter made an uncustomary bad start and the favourite's Derby chances were effectively ended out of the traps. Clona Duke and Ninja Kerry both encountered crowding at the first bend and were both well beaten.

== See also ==
- 2023 UK & Ireland Greyhound Racing Year
