= Hall Green Stadium =

Greyhound racing stadium in Birmingham, England

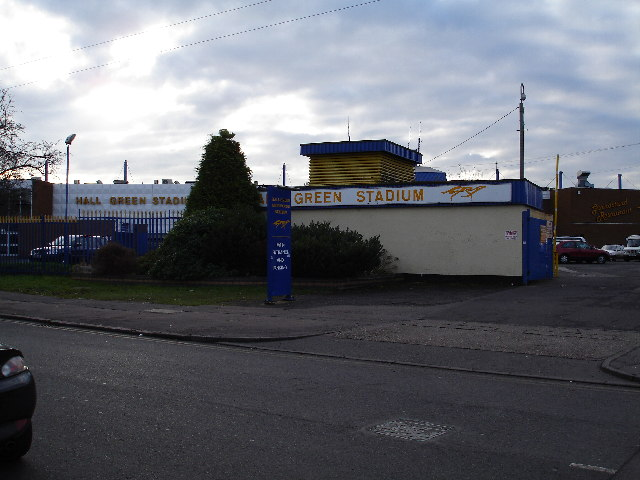
- Interactive map of Hall Green Stadium
- Full name: Hall Green Greyhound Stadium
- Location: York Road, Hall Green, Birmingham, England
- Coordinates: 52.4380°N 1.8403°W

Construction
- Opened: 24 August 1927
- Renovated: 1970, 1981, 1987, 1989
- Closed: 29 July 2017
- Demolished: May 2018

Hall Green Stadium was a greyhound racing stadium located in the Birmingham suburb of Hall Green, which existed from 1927 until 2017.

The track itself was a 412-metre long oval track with a sand covered surface. The capacity of the stadium was between 2,500 and 3,000.

== Facilities ==
The stadium's main stand facilities included outside terracing along the main straight, fast food outlets, a bar on the first floor, and an indoor seated area with glass frontage overlooking the track on second floor. Also on the second floor was the a la carte restaurant. Executive suites that can hold between 18 and 100 people were located on the first bend of the track.

Related facilities included a hotel situated on bends 3 and 4 which opened in 1990, some rooms of which offered views of the track and a purpose-built snooker hall along the back straight with 21 full sized tables. Conference facilities were also provided and managed by the stadium.

== Renovations ==
Investment in 1970 resulted in the track becoming one of the major provincials in the country and the GRA spent over £750,000 renovating the club house into a four tier restaurant and a new electronic display tote board was built. The track kennels were demolished during the renovation resulting in a contract trainer system.

In 1981 the track changed to an all-sand surface which replaced the former grass straights, an 'Outside McKee Scott' hare and undersoil heating were also installed. Further stadium improvements in 1987 including a large snooker club to the tune of £400,000 and another face lift in 1989 to the tune of £1 million saw an extension to the restaurant and construction of a 48 bedroom hotel called 'The Lodge'. A new track surface was also installed during this latest investment.

== Greyhound racing ==
=== Origins & opening ===
The Greyhound Racing Association (GRA) bought the land that was known as the Olympia Sports Ground in the Birmingham suburb of Hall Green and constructed a greyhound track. Opened on 24 August 1927 it was the first greyhound track to be built in the city. A crowd of 20,000 turned up to experience racing for the first time despite the fact that another Birmingham track Kings Heath Stadium had just opened three months previous. The first race on that Wednesday evening was won by Lock Latham owned by Lady Lock and Mr P.Latham and was over 500 yards in a winning time of 29.66. Appearing that same night was Bonzo who duly won his race and would go on to win the first ever running of the Champion Hurdle race at White City Stadium, London, and this event would soon be called the Grand National.

=== Early history ===
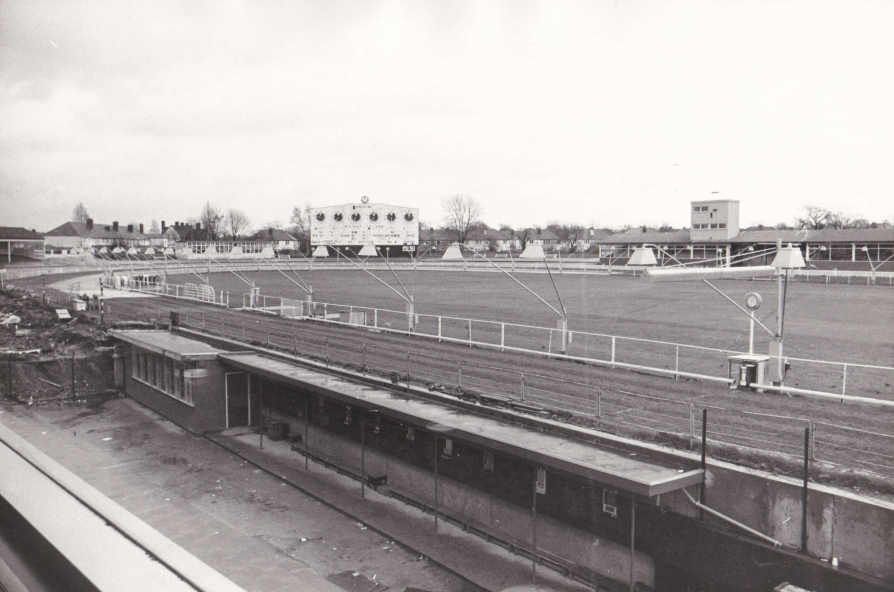
Hall Green Greyhound Stadium c.1960

In the late 1920s a 440-yard circumference track was a decent size circuit with long straights and fairly easy turns. Handicaps and an 'Inside Sumner' hare were features of the track and the main distances were 500 and 700 yards. Facilities at the time included the main stand which offered the Hall Green Sports Club and Enclosure Club with stands on the opposite side of the track to accommodate the large patronage. A small annual subscription allowed patron's admittance to the clubs and it was not long before a restaurant service was introduced. Similar to other larger tracks of the time there was a resting kennel located away from the track and the Hall Green resting kennels were found nearby at Bogay Hall Farm in Solihull. The stadium hosted speedway races between 1928 and 1938, with a team called the Birmingham Bulldogs racing out of the stadium.

After the war the track introduced a major event for the first time and it was called the Midland Flat Championship and the centre green was home to the Hall Green Amateurs football team between 1951 until 1965.

=== Later history ===
After the completion of the new facilities in 1970 the stadium recruited one of the country's finest trainers at the time in Geoffrey DeMulder. In 1973 another trainer Sid Mann retired ending a 43-year association with the GRA, Mann had originally taken out a licence in 1930. Sometime later Racing Manager Jeff Jefcoate joined Northern Sports at Ramsgate Stadium and his assistant Horace Peplow retired after 50 years leaving Sidney Wood the deputy chief Racing Manager for the GRA in charge and he was joined by Simon Harris. As 1984 came to an end the great Scurlogue Champ set two track records, one in December 1984 and another the following year.

In 1993 the British Breeders Forum Produce was switched from Wembley to Hall Green and Simon Harris was replaced by Gary Woodward. The Television Trophy was hosted at the track for the third time in 1997 following the previous staging in 1979 & 1988 and in 1999 the Blue Riband competition was brought to the track following the demise of Wembley with the Grand National switching to sister track Wimbledon Stadium. Under General Manager Stephen Rea two new races were inaugurated by the track, they were the Gymcrack in 2000 and the Prestige in 2003 but the Midland Flat was discontinued, it had been the tracks oldest race.

=== Competitions ===
- Blue Riband (1999-2012)
- Golden Jacket (1985)
- Grand National (1985-1998)
- Gymcrack (2000-2010)
- Midland Flat (1946-2006)
- Prestige (2003-2017)
- Produce Stakes (1993-2008)

=== Achievements ===
- 1973 Hall Green lost a closely fought battle with Wembley in the Duke of Edinburgh Cup Grand Final by 64 points to 56.
- 1974 & 1979 Geoff DeMulder won two English Greyhound Derby triumphs in 1974 & 1979 with Jimsun and Sarahs Bunny respectively.
- 1992 Kildare Slippy trained by Paddy Hancox set some unbelievable track records. He recorded 28.52 winning a 474-metre hurdle race which was a sensation because it was four spots quicker than the 474 metre flat track record. This incredible run must go down as one of the greatest performances in racing history.

== Closure ==
In 2014 the National Asset Management Agency (parent company of the Greyhound Racing Association) sold Hall Green and Belle Vue stadiums but retained a lease agreement for both venues; with Hall Green Stadium being purchased by Euro Property Investments Limited for £3 million. It was revealed on 23 February 2016 that the stadium is to be closed down and demolished in the near future due to a housing planning application made by owner Euro Property Investments Limited. The planning submission to the local council was originally declined in June 2016; but this ruling was subsequently overturned by appeal during the following month, and consequently a decision to allow demolition of the stadium was ratified by the council. In June 2017, it was revealed by the stadium's chief executive Clive Feltham that the stadium would close at the end of the following month; and the stadium's final night of racing occurred on 29 July 2017. Demolition of the stadium to make way for the housing estate subsequently commenced in May 2018.

== Track records (at closing) ==
Extended content

| Distance | Greyhound | Time | Date | Notes |
|---|---|---|---|---|
| 258m | Ballymac Denis | 15.12 | 18 April 2012 | |
| 259m | Fearless Action | 15.46 | 30 November 1985 | |
| 474m | Westmead Chick | 28.20 | 19 November 1994 | |
| 480m | Eye On the Storm | 28.02 | 13 April 2010 | |
| 606m | Glideaway Ted | 38.78 | 27 March 1982 | |
| 645m | Palace Issue | 39.01 | 22 September 2000 | |
| 663m | Roseville Jackie | 41.37 | 9 April 1988 | |
| 670m | Fearless Lynx | 40.44 | February 1995 | |
| 683m | Gaisce Dubh | 41.29 | 4 October 1991 | |
| 815m | Minnies Siren | 52.50 | 27 April 1988 | |
| 820m | Kilpipe Bib | 51.71 | 24 June 1993 | |
| 892m | Head Iton Jordan | 55.24 | 27 March 2007 | |
| 480mH | Kildare Slippy | 28.52 | 8 April 1992 | Grand National final |
| 645mH | Go Dutch | 40.70 | 25 February 2003 | |

== Former track records ==
Extended content

Post metric

| Distance | Greyhound | Time | Date | Notes |
|---|---|---|---|---|
| 258m | Hows Yer Man | 15.32 | 1993+ | |
| 258m | Lunar Vacation | 15.30 | 27 March 2007 | |
| 258m | Officer Donagh | 15.29 | 1 December 2009 | |
| 258m | Fifis Rocket | 15.14 | 19 April 2011 | |
| 259m | Foxy Cooper | 15.45 | 1977+ | |
| 474m | Pat Seamur | 28.49 | 1977+ | |
| 474m | Rikasso Hiker | 28.59 | 13 October 1982 | |
| 474m | Westmead Merlin | 28.33 | 15 October 1994 | |
| 480m | Vintage Cleaner | 28.20 | 25 April 2000 | Blue Riband Final |
| 480m | Harsu Super | 28.13 | 13 October 2001 | Produce Stakes semi-final |
| 480m | Farloe Verdict | 28.09 | 6 May 2003 | Blue Riband Final |
| 480m | Toosey Blue | 28.05 | 10 July 2007 | |
| 480m | Eye On the Storm | 28.03 | 29 September 2009 | Blue Riband Final |
| 606m | Let Him Go | 37.65 | 1977+ | |
| 663m | Katie Toughnut | 40.88 | 1977+ | |
| 663m | Man Soda | 41.59 | 1983+ | |
| 663m | Scurlogue Champ | 41.56 | 27 February 1985 | |
| 663m | Special Bran | 41.50 | 7 September 1985 | |
| 663m | Super Duchess | 41.42 | 1987+ | |
| 815m | Scurlogue Champ | 52.51 | 1 December 1984 | |
| 892m | Spenwood Wizard | 56.13 | 27 April 1999 | |
| 892m | Spenwood Wizard | 55.74 | 18 January 2000 | |
| 892m | Spenwood Wizard | 55.34 | 16 June 2000 | |
| 474mH | Autumn Berlin | 29.39 | 1980+ | |
| 474mH | Lovely Pud | 29.38 | 8 September 1984 | |
| 474mH | Kildare Slippy | 29.14 | 22 April 1991 | |
| 474mH | Kildare Slippy | 29.06 | 14 March 1992 | Grand National Trial Stakes |
| 474mH | Kildare Slippy | 28.79 | 28 March 1992 | Grand National First Round |
| 645mH | Eezar Ferrari | 40.71 | 13 December 1999 | |

Pre Metric

| Distance (yards) | Greyhound | Time (sec) | Date | Notes/ref |
|---|---|---|---|---|
| 500y | Demotic Mack | 28.30 | 17 June 1937 | |
| 500y | Rushton Smutty | 28.04 | August 1951 | Midland Flat Final |
| 500y | Rushton Spot | 27.94 | 1 September 1954 | |
| 500y | Kilbeg Kuda | 27.79 | 11 August 1965 | |
| 500y | Bresheen Legacy | 27.73 | 12 April 1971 | |
| 500y | Short Cake | 27.37 | 1973+ | |
| 700y | Blacklion Fashion | 40.74 | 1937 | |
| 700y | Sheehan | 40.58 | 2 April 1938 | |
| 700y | Jersey Creamery | 40.40 | 1948+ | |
| 700y | Greenane Airlines | 39.94 | 30 May 1959 | |
| 700y | Clahane Girl | 39.60 | 15 August 1962 | |
| 700y | Westpark Quail | 35.59 | 1965 | |
| 700y | The Grand Canoe | 39.42 | 17 July 1965 | |
| 700y | Westmead Mia | | June 1973 | |
| 880y | The Cherry Tree | 51.46 | 17 February 1962 | |
| 880y | Black Myross | 50.90 | 19 July 1971 | |
| 937y | Tarry Oh No | 56.10 | 1 September 1956 | |
| 937y | Model Airlines | 55.98 | 19 August 1961 | |
| 500yH | Patlander | 29.42 | 2 May 1934 | |
| 500yH | Husky Sam | 29.03 | 22 August 1959 | |
| 500yH | Old Berry Star | 28.75 | 17 August 1963 | |
| 500yH | Sherry's Prince | 28.60 | 15 September 1971 | |
| 500yH | Sherry's Prince | 28.38 | 2 October 1971 | Midland Grand National |
| 700yH | Border Rambler | 42.30 | 19 August 1939 | |

+ Record holder during year
