= Owlerton Stadium =

Sports stadium in Sheffield

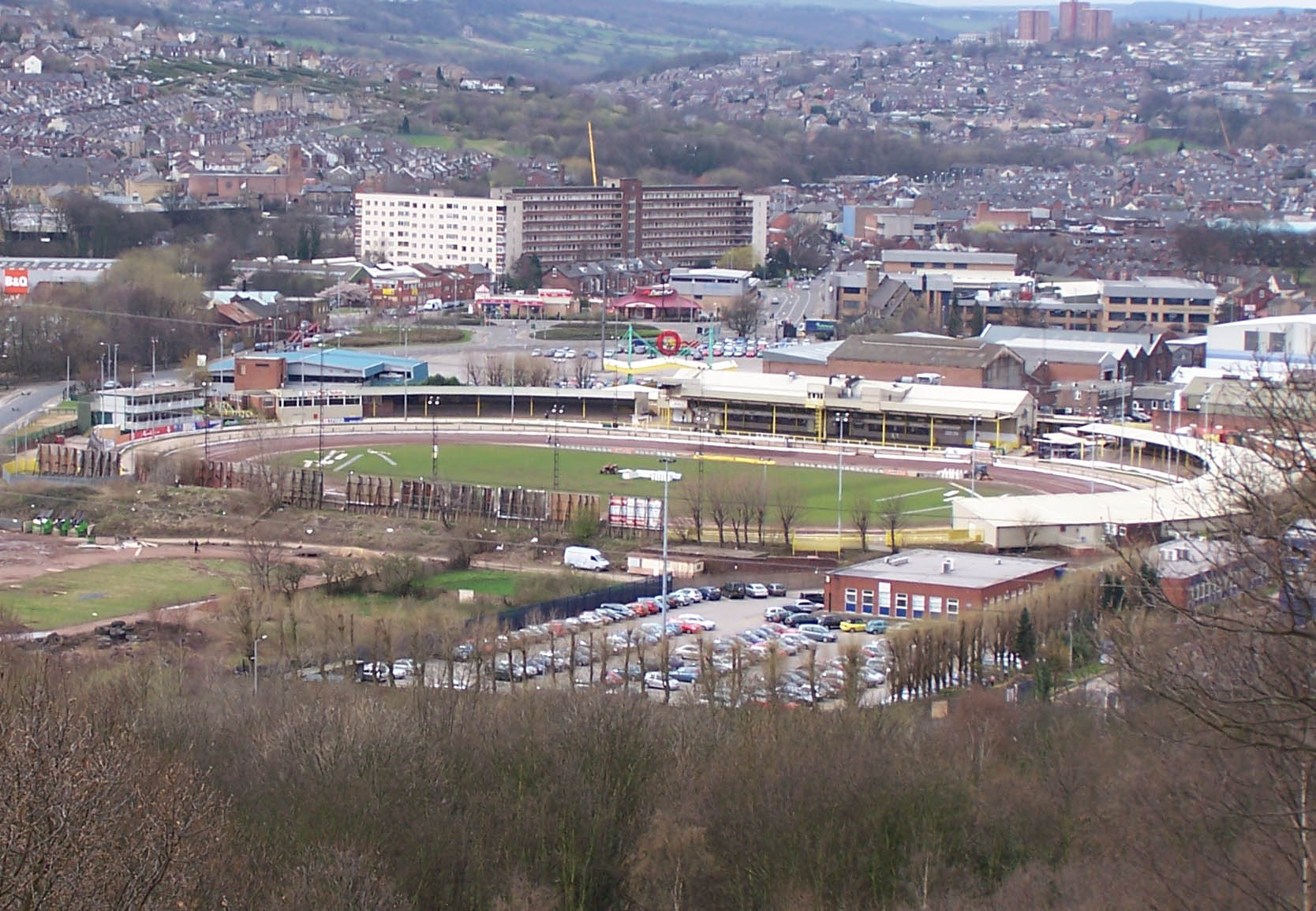
- Aerial view of Owlerton Stadium from Shirecliffe to the NE.
- Interactive map of Owlerton Stadium
- Full name: Owlerton Stadium
- Location: Owlerton, Sheffield
- Coordinates: 53°24′23″N 1°29′33″W
- Owner: A&S Leisure Group
- Capacity: 4,000
- Public transit: Y Hillsborough Park

Construction
- Built: 1929
- Expanded: 2019 conference centre and executive suites

Tenants
- Greyhound Racing (1932-); Sheffield Eagles (2014-15); Sheffield Eagles (1984) (1984–89); Sheffield Tigers (1929–); Sheffield F.C. (1897–1901, 1989)

Website
- Official website

Owlerton Stadium, also known as Sheffield Stadium, is a purpose-built speedway stadium built in 1929, which hosts greyhound racing five-times a week. The track is in Owlerton near Hillsborough in Sheffield, South Yorkshire, England. Greyhound racing takes place on Friday and Saturday evenings and every Tuesday, Thursday and Sunday afternoon. There is a modern glass-fronted Panorama Restaurant accommodating up to 300 people, executive suites, fast food facilities and a number of bars.

The stadium is also home to the Sheffield Tigers Speedway team and hosts BriSCA Formula One stock car racing events. Speedway takes place on a Thursday evening and the stadium has a total capacity for 4,000 spectators.

It is operated by the A & S Leisure Group, the majority shareholder of which is Dave Allen. Allen was previously the chairman of football team Sheffield Wednesday who play at the nearby Hillsborough Stadium, which coincidentally was originally named Owlerton Stadium.

== Speedway ==
Sheffield Tigers have run at Owlerton Stadium since it was built in 1929.

== Sidecar Speedway ==
The British Sidecar Speedway Championship took place at the Stadium in 2010. It was won by Mark Cossar and Andi Wilson.

== Rugby League ==
The stadium hosted the Sheffield Eagles' first ever game in September 1984; they left five years later following changes to crowd rules, however they returned for one season in 2014 after their previous home the Don Valley Stadium was demolished.

== Greyhound racing ==
=== Origins and opening ===
In 1929 construction began on a 20-acre freehold site to build a new stadium in Owlerton. The site was surrounded by steel works with a steel forge directly on the north side and a cutlery forge directly on the west side. To the south was the Birley Meadow steel forge and Owlerton Bridge Rolling Mills steel works. The only area without steel works was on the east side where allotments and gardens were to be found. The Penistone Road ran alongside the west and where Lowther Road originated it could take you directly to the stadium although today the main car park is on Livesey Street on the south side. With the Darnall Stadium opening in 1927 Owlerton track became the second oval circuit greyhound racing in Sheffield. On 12 January 1932 an official opening night took place in regards to greyhound racing. The venue had initially been used for speedway with a first meeting held on 30 March 1929. The stands were subsequently altered to accommodate the impending greyhound racing with a newly built glass fronted grandstand.

The opening night attracted a crowd of 10,000. The press described the tote as a "mechanical and electrical marvel as it registered bets within fractions of a second as they were placed". Seven races were held and the first race over 525 yards the 'Oxford Stakes' was claimed by 3–1 shot 'Carbrook Ted' winning by two lengths in 33.63 secs. Adding variety to the meeting was a 700-yard race and a hurdle race. The five 525 yard flat race winning times spanned 32.40 to 35.78 secs.

=== Pre-war history ===
A third track arrived to the city of Sheffield in the form of Hyde Park Greyhound Stadium which would always remain independent leaving Darnall and Owlerton to licensed racing. Owlerton owned by Sheffield Sports Stadium Ltd became the primary track in Sheffield and the set-up of the track consisted of a 472 yards circumference with distances of 300, 500, 525 and 700 yards. The grandstand and club were situated on the home straight and there was a parade ring to be found behind these which allowed the public to view the greyhounds pre-race. The track had two hares, an 'Inside Sumner' and an 'Outside MS Cable'. The racing kennels were next to the parade ring and there were another 120 resident kennels that replaced the kennels formerly located at Wardsend Farm in a range of stone buildings.

Sam Vinter joined the track in the thirties as Racing Manager and owner/breeder Alf Morton bred and supplied the track with greyhounds using Irish Derby winner Marching Through Georgia as the sire. Morton was responsible for breeding Victor Ben Hur a track champion and record holder over both 500 & 700 yards in 1940. Duffys Arrival was once trained at the track before he went to (Coventry) trainer George McKay and two of the early trainers at the track were Harry Bidwell, who would have a thirty-year association with Owlerton, and Ted Brennan.

=== Post-war history ===
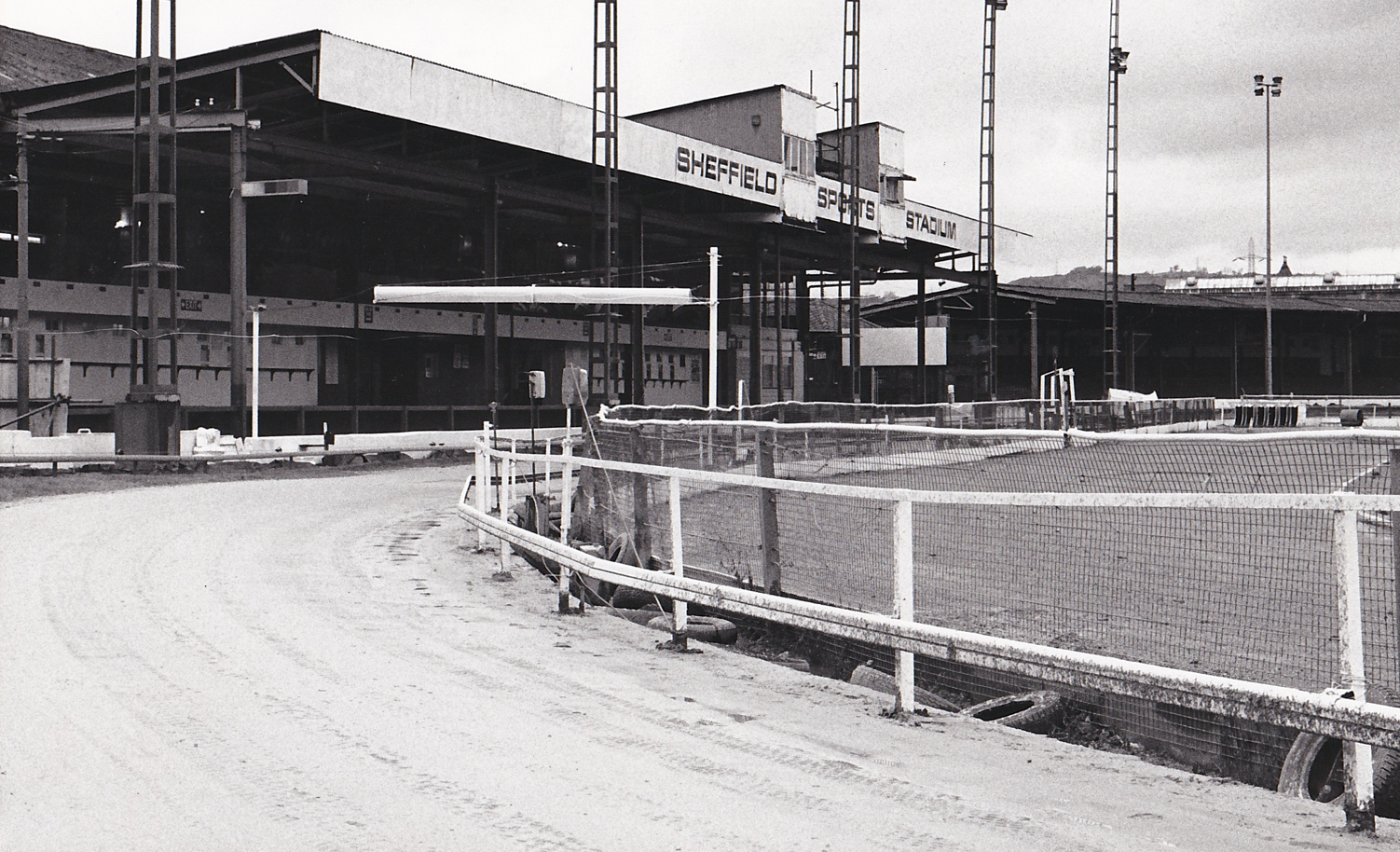
Greyhound track at Owlerton Stadium c.1960

Trade during the war was exceptional but there was very little open racing due to travel issues and it was not until 1950 that Ted Brennan started to establish himself as one of the leading northern trainers. The track claimed the 1951 News of the World Intertrack Championship, the greyhound racing equivalent of the F.A. Cup at the time. Jim Hookway became a resident trainer in 1953 and joined Brennan in dominating the northern scene. In 1959 Ted Brennan's brother Jack switched from the Darnall kennels to join Owlerton and Dancing Sheik trained by Ted Brennan became the first Derby finalist for the track.

The sixties saw rival track Darnall close down and Owlerton was bought by the Sheffield Corporation after a £185,000 offer had been accepted. The corporation converted the three private clubs into public bars which helped boost attendance figures and in 1969 they made £30,000 improvements to the Lowther Road grandstand. Hookway was rewarded with the title of Trainer of the Year which he shared with John Bassett in 1965. The accolade had been helped considerably by a greyhound called Clonmannon Flash who had won the Scottish Greyhound Derby & Edinburgh Cup double.

In February 1965 an Irish litter by Crazy Parachute out of Supreme Witch bred by Leo Stack included Tric-Trac, Spectre II, Forward King and Forward Flash. This litter made its way to Hookway and the Brennan brothers kennels and would become one of the greatest litters of all time. At White City on 24 June 1967 Tric-Trac defeated his brother Spectre II by one length in the 1967 English Greyhound Derby final. Hookway received the Trainer of the Year accolade for a second time.

By 1970 Owlerton introduced the Steel City Cup and as the decade progressed Sam Vinter the long serving Racing Manager retired in 1973 to be replaced by Terry Meynell. Ted Brennan retired the following year and his place was taken by Harry Crapper and Jim Hookway also retired after a very successful career. Sheffield replaced the grass circuit with an all-sand surface in 1978.

Terry Corden who held the lease at Derby Stadium added Sheffield to his portfolio by obtaining the lease at the track but the ageing stadium became a problem following the Hillsborough disaster in April 1989 which resulted in ramifications for the track. The Taylor Report and subsequent government actions on stadium safety meant a substantial financial boost was required at many stadia and as a result Corden sold Derby and the local council closed Sheffield until the improvements were completed. Corden, General Manager Jon Carter and Racing Manager Jimmy Nunn were powerless to stop the stadium closing for the first time since it had opened in 1932.

The stadium was to re-open following investment and David Gunson was brought in as Racing Manager but the track suffered a second closure in the spring of 1990 following a mistake with the betting licence. Tennents provided major sponsorship deals until 1991 when A&S Leisure (owners of five casino restaurants) stepped in and purchased the track spending a £3 million on refurbishment. Attendances rose and Dave Baldwin stepped in to take over from Dave Gunson and Barrie Draper became a major trainer.

=== 21st century ===
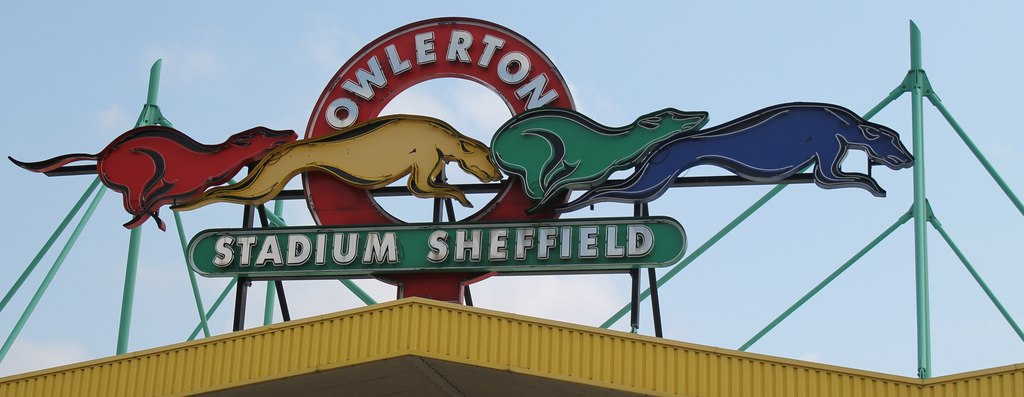
The Owlerton stadium signage

Another major refurbishment took place in 2008. Former Greyhound Racing Association manager John Gilburn arrived as managing director and secured the prestigious trainers' championship for the first time in the track's history in 2009 and then again in 2014. Additionally a second home competition the Three Steps to Victory was inaugurated in 2003.

In 2018 the stadium signed a media rights deal with ARC to race every Monday and Thursday afternoon and every Tuesday and Saturday evening. In November 2019 the stadium opened a new £6 million conference centre and executive suite facility. Further improvements were announced in May 2022 with a £400,000 refurbishment that included a track replacement, a new running rail and drainage.

In 2024 a new five-year contract extension with ARC was agreed, to run from January 2025.

=== Competitions ===
- Steel City Cup
- Three Steps to Victory
- Northern Sprint
- Puppy Cup
- Ebor Stakes (1982)

=== Track records ===
==== Current records ====
Metres	Greyhound	Time	Date	Notes
280	Coolavanny Galiv	15.65	5 April 2022	
480	Nolas Beauty	27.25	18 October 2022	Three Steps to Victory heats
500	Domino Storm	28.27	26 April 2016	
660	Billys Bullet	38.29	7 April 2015	
720	Ballyard Buddy	42.33	14 August 2012	
915	King Kane	55.58	6 August 2014	TV Trophy final
934	Roxholme Magic	56.28	26 April 2016	
500 H	Razldazl Raidio	28.96	25 April 2017	

==== Pre Metric records ====
Yards	Greyhound	Time	Date	Notes
300	Silver Wire	16.70	12 May 1939	
450	Brilliant Shore	25.63	6 March 1938	
500	Victor Ben Hur	28.02	19 October 1940	
525	Latin Pearl	29.25	29 July 1946	
525	Mad Astley	29.16	1954	
525	S.S.Leader	28.66	22 September 1961	
525	Tric Trac	28.48	9 September 1966	
550	Airbourne General	30.07	10 April 1964	
550	Eleventh Wonder	29.95	6 July 1971	
550	Kudas Honour	29.88	1972	Steel City Cup Final
700	Victor Ben Hur	40.28	17 August 1940	
700	Leinster Elm	39.04	19 July 1963	
770	Black Magic	44.03	9 August 1955	
770	Airbourne General		27 May 1966	
770	Rainbow Trout	43.12	22 July 1966	
880	Poor Barney	49.70	9 October 1971	
525 H	Gaullsmill Again	30.67	1950	
525 H	Celtic Rebel	29.78	1970	
525 H	Bingo Basher	29.76	24 March 1972	

==== Post Metric records ====
Metres	Greyhound	Time	Date	Notes
280	Parliament Act	16.38	22 July 2000	
280	Laser Beam	16.27	14 August 2005	
280	Magna Maisie	16.26	30 September 2006	
280	Smooth Mac	16.19	17 October 2006	
280	Camp Bugler	16.14	17 November 2006	
280	Lunar Vacation	15.94	23 June 2007	
280	Tyrur Hestor	15.84	28 February 2009	
280	Tyrur Hestor	15.78	17 March 2009	
280	Boherbradda Mac	15.78	4 April 2009	
280	Droopys Quincy	15.70	7 May 2013	
280	Brogan Tee Bone	15.67	15 December 2015	
290	Fearless Prince	16.78	13 August 1980	
290	Melton Hill	16.78	19 October 1990	
290	Fosse Way	16.77	27 February 1999	
290	Fosse Way	16.72	8 May 1999	
362	Check Out	20.97	3 May 1989	
362	Farloe Bubble	20.82	4 October 1997	
380	Loughlass Champ	22.09	1987	
480	Cheeky Hero	28.07	1994	
480	Reggies Hero	28.04	14 November 1997	
480	Farloe Superman	28.00	23 February 2008	
480	Coolavanny Smoke	27.86	17 March 2009	
480	Farloe Firefox	27.76	16 June 2009	
480	Carden Bert	27.66	4 August 2009	
480	Bandicoot Mafi	27.64	1 November 2009	
480	Reluctant	27.55	6 July 2010	
480	Eden Star	27.39	21 June 2011	
480	Candlelight King	27.32	6 August 2014	
480	Roxholme Kristof	27.27	15 September 2020	Three Steps to Victory heats
500	Tillbrook Herald	29.21	1976	Steel City Cup final
500	Desert Pilot	29.65	1978	Steel City Cup] semi-final
500	Jebb Rambler	29.61	1979	Bass Cup final
500	Desert Pilot	29.38	25 April 1980	Steel City Cup final
500	Galtymore Lad	29.25	19 January 1990	
500	He Knows	29.01	2 May 1997	Embassy Cup Final
500	Plasterscene Gem	29.00	8 August 1998	
500	Zigzag Dutchman	28.93	5 September 2006	
500	Farloe Hobbs	28.90	12 September 2006	Steel City Cup heats
500	Farloe Reason	28.83	14 February 2009	
500	Thurlesbeg Joker	28.79	7 March 2009	
500	Thurlesbeg Joker	28.50	17 March 2009	
500	Boher Paddy	28.44	31 August 2010	
650	Brainy Prince	39.36	11 August 1979	
650	Desert Pilot	38.80	9 August 1980	
660	Suncrest Sail	39.40	19 July 1996	
660	Droopys Rhys	39.40	27 November 2001	
660	Larkhill Bird	39.39	10 December 2006	
660	Stepaside Yoda	39.26	15 February 2008	
660	Capel Wilson	38.88	7 March 2009	
660	Raving Black	38.71	4 August 2009	
660	Ballymac Eske	38.61	24 June 2014	Three Steps to Victory final
715	White Rooms	43.78	1987	
720	Let Us Know	43.48	30 March 2001	
720	Cherry Andy	43.44	27 November 2001	
720	Top Plan	43.40	29 March 2003	
720	Droopys Sporty	43.28	17 January 2006	
720	Tinrah Lad	43.04	21 January 2006	
720	Swift Ninja	42.80	3 November 2007	
720	Run of the Hawk	42.80	29 September 2009	
730	Beano Blondie	44.63	22 August 1986	
730	Suncrest Sail	43.64	30 April 1995	
800	Change Guard	49.02	15 August 1986	
800	Hollinwood Poppy	48.25	27 December 2000	
915	Souda Bay	57.97	22 March 1998	
915	Hollinwood Poppy	56.25	4 July 2000	
915	King Kane	55.80	29 July 2014	TV Trophy heats
934	Thornfield Poppy	58.83	13 November 1998	
934	Seathwaite Robby	57.87	5 September 2006	
934	Barley Bussell	57.69	3 November 2013	
500 H	Castlelyons Cash	30.85	22 August 1986	
500 H	Autumn Merlin	29.94	4 July 2000	
500 H	Trojan Flight	29.72	24 April 2005	
500 H	Jills Fault	29.65	6 November 2007	
500 H	Bomber Bailey	29.23	4 August 2009	

== Football ==
The world's oldest football club, Sheffield, used the stadium before their move to Dronfield.
