= Longford (disambiguation) =

Longford is a town in Ireland.

Longford may also refer to:

== Places ==
=== Ireland ===
- Longford, County Longford's county town
- County Longford
- Longford, County Galway, a townland
- Longford, County Laois, a townland
- Longford, County Limerick, a townland
- Longford, County Mayo, a townland
- Longford, County Meath, a townland
- Longford, County Offaly, a townland
- Longford, County Roscommon, a townland
- Longford Demesne, County Sligo, a townland
- Longford, County Tipperary, a townland
- Longford (County Galway barony)
- Longford (County Longford barony)
- County Longford (UK Parliament constituency)

=== England ===
- Longford, Coventry, West Midlands, an area and electoral ward
- Longford, Derbyshire, a village
- Longford, Gloucestershire, a village near Gloucester
- Longford, Greater Manchester, a ward of Trafford
- Longford, Kent, a location
- Longford, London, Borough of Hillingdon
  - Longford River
- Longford, Moreton Say, near Market Drayton, Shropshire
- Longford, Telford and Wrekin, near Newport, Shropshire
- Longford, Warrington, Cheshire
- Longford Castle, near Bodenham, Wiltshire

=== Australia ===
- Longford, New South Wales, see Acacia nana
- Longford, Tasmania, a town
- Longford, Victoria, a town

=== Canada ===
- Longford, Ontario
- Longford Mills, Ontario, a community in Ramara

=== United States ===
- Longford, Kansas
- Longford, U.S. Virgin Islands

== People ==
- Christine Longford (1900–1980), Anglo-Irish playwright
- Elizabeth Pakenham, Countess of Longford (1906–2002), British historian
- Frank Pakenham, 7th Earl of Longford (1905–2001), British politician
  - Longford (film), a 2006 British television drama about his long battle to win parole for the Moors Murderess, Myra Hindley
  - Longford Lecture
  - Longford Prize
  - The Longford Trust
- Raymond Longford (1878–1959), Australian film director, writer, producer and actor

== Other uses ==
- Esso Longford gas explosion, a 1998 chemical disaster occurring near Longford, Victoria
- Longford Circuit, a motor racing street circuit based around the Tasmanian town
- Longford Football Club, an Australian rules football club based in the Tasmanian town
- Longford GAA, the Gaelic games body for County Longford
- Longford Leader, a newspaper published in Longford, Ireland
- Longford RFC, a rugby team based in Longford, Ireland
- Longford Town F.C., an association football team based in Longford, Ireland

== Longford Hall ==
- Longford Hall, Derbyshire
- Longford Hall, Greater Manchester
- Longford Hall, Shropshire

== See also ==
- Earl of Longford
