= Judith Kazantzis =

British poet and activist (1940–2018)

- Born: 14 August 1940; Oxford, England
- Died: 18 September 2018 (aged 78)
- Education: Somerville College, Oxford
- Occupations: Poet and activist
- Spouse(s): Alexander John Kazantzis (m. 1963; div. 1982) Irving Weinman (m. 1998; div. 2015)
- Parent(s): Frank Pakenham, 7th Earl of Longford and Elizabeth Pakenham, Countess of Longford
- Relatives: Rachel Billington (sister), Antonia Fraser (sister), Thomas Pakenham (brother)

Judith Elizabeth Kazantzis (née Pakenham; 14 August 1940 – 18 September 2018) was a British poet and political and social activist.

== Life ==
Kazantzis was born in Oxford, England, and grew up in East Sussex, the fourth child and second daughter of the eight children born to Lord and Lady Longford, and sister of novelist Rachel Billington and historians Dame Antonia Fraser and Thomas Pakenham. She attended St Leonards-Mayfield School, and then More House School in Kensington. She wrote her first poem aged seven. She took a Modern History degree at Somerville College, Oxford. She began writing textbooks on history, worked for the Chelsea Labour Party and reviewed for the Evening Standard. She avoided the usage of the title "Lady" as the daughter of an earl. During the 1970s she turned to poetry, fiction, painting and printmaking. She was a committed feminist, writing for the magazine Spare Rib, and was strongly influenced by Sylvia Plath's poetry.

In her own poetry, Kazantzis wrote about injustice and contributed short stories to Critical Quarterly, for which Plath had also written. Kazantzis supported the Campaign for Nuclear Disarmament and joined the protestors at RAF Greenham Common air base in the 1980s. She lived in London and later in East Sussex again, and spent three months a year in Key West, Florida, where her second husband, Irving Weinman, taught.

In the 1990s, she worked for Kalayaan – Justice for Migrant Domestic Workers. In 1999, she left Tony Blair's Labour Party, and since 2001 helped campaign for Occupied Palestine (she was a founder of British Writers in Support of Palestine). She chaired the judges of the Longford Prize (named in honour of her father) in support of prison reform. In 2003, she signed the Statement for Peace of the 21st Key West Literary Seminar. In August 2010, Kazantzis contributed to an eBook collection of political poems entitled Emergency Verse - Poetry in Defence of the Welfare State, edited by Alan Morrison.

Her poems have appeared in The London Magazine, Stand, Ambit, Agenda, Poetry Review, Poetry London, Poetry Wales, Bete Noire, The Honest Ulsterman, Poetry Ireland, Red Pepper, The Independent, New Statesman, Tribune, and Banipal.

== Marriage ==
She married lawyer Alexander John Kazantzis on 26 February 1963 and had two children. The couple divorced in 1982, but she kept his surname professionally. On 22 February 1998, she married lawyer and writer Irving Weinman. Harry Mathews wrote an epithalamium for Judith Kazantzis and Irving Weinman.

== Death ==
Judith Kazantzis died on 18 September 2018, aged 78, from undisclosed causes. She was survived by two children, two stepchildren, and six siblings.

== Awards ==
- 2005–06, Royal Literary Fund Fellow at Sussex University
- 2007, Society of Authors' Cholmondeley Award

== Works ==
- "Tropic". Poemhunter.

=== Poetry ===
- Just After Midnight : Poems, 1997-2003. London: Enitharmon Press. 2004. ISBN 978-1-904634-02-7. OCLC 56659573.
- The Odysseus Poems: Fictions on the Odyssey of Homer. Cargo Press. 1999. ISBN 978-1-899980-07-9.
- Swimming Through The Grand Hotel. Enitharmon Press. 1997. ISBN 978-1-900564-20-5.
- Selected Poems 1977-1992. Sinclair-Stevenson. 1995. ISBN 1-85619-552-X.
- The Rabbit Magician Plate. Sinclair-Stevenson. 1992. ISBN 978-1-85619-169-2.
- Flame Tree. Methuen. 1988. ISBN 978-0-413-17880-0.
- Poem for Guatemala. Bedlam. 1986. ISBN 978-1-870260-01-5.
- Freight Song (Poems on the Underground, tenth anthology. Cassel. 1986.
- Let's Pretend. 1984, Virago Press
- Kazantzis, Judith; Roberts, Michèle; Wandor, Michelene (1982). Touch Papers: Three Women Poets. London, New York: Allison and Busby. ISBN 9780850314762. OCLC 9552351. 96 pages.
- The Wicked Queen. Sidgwick and Jackson. 1980.
- Minefield. Sidgwick and Jackson. 1977.

=== Fiction ===
- Of Love and Terror. London: Saqi Books. 2002. ISBN 978-0-86356-316-4.

=== Translator ===
- In Cyclops' Cave: The Odyssey, Book IX, LI 105-566. The Greville Press. 2002. ISBN 978-0-906887-74-5.

=== Anthologies ===
- Christmas Cards (Enitharmon Press, 2005)
- A Celebration of Wilfred Owen (The Interpreter's House)
- Poems On The Underground (Cassell, 2001)
- Parents (Enitharmon 2000)
- Red Sky At Night (Many Leaves Press, 2003)
- A Ring of Words (Arvon Prize Anthology, 1998)
- Mind Readings, Dancing in the Street, The Faber Book of Blue Verse and the Virago Book of Love Poetry.
- Poems on the Underground featured her poem "Freight Song" (Cassell).

=== Essays ===
- Michelene Wandor, ed. (1983). "The Errant Unicorn". On Gender and Writing. Taylor & Francis. ISBN 978-0-86358-021-5.
