= Peter Stanford =

English writer, editor, journalist and presenter (born 1961)

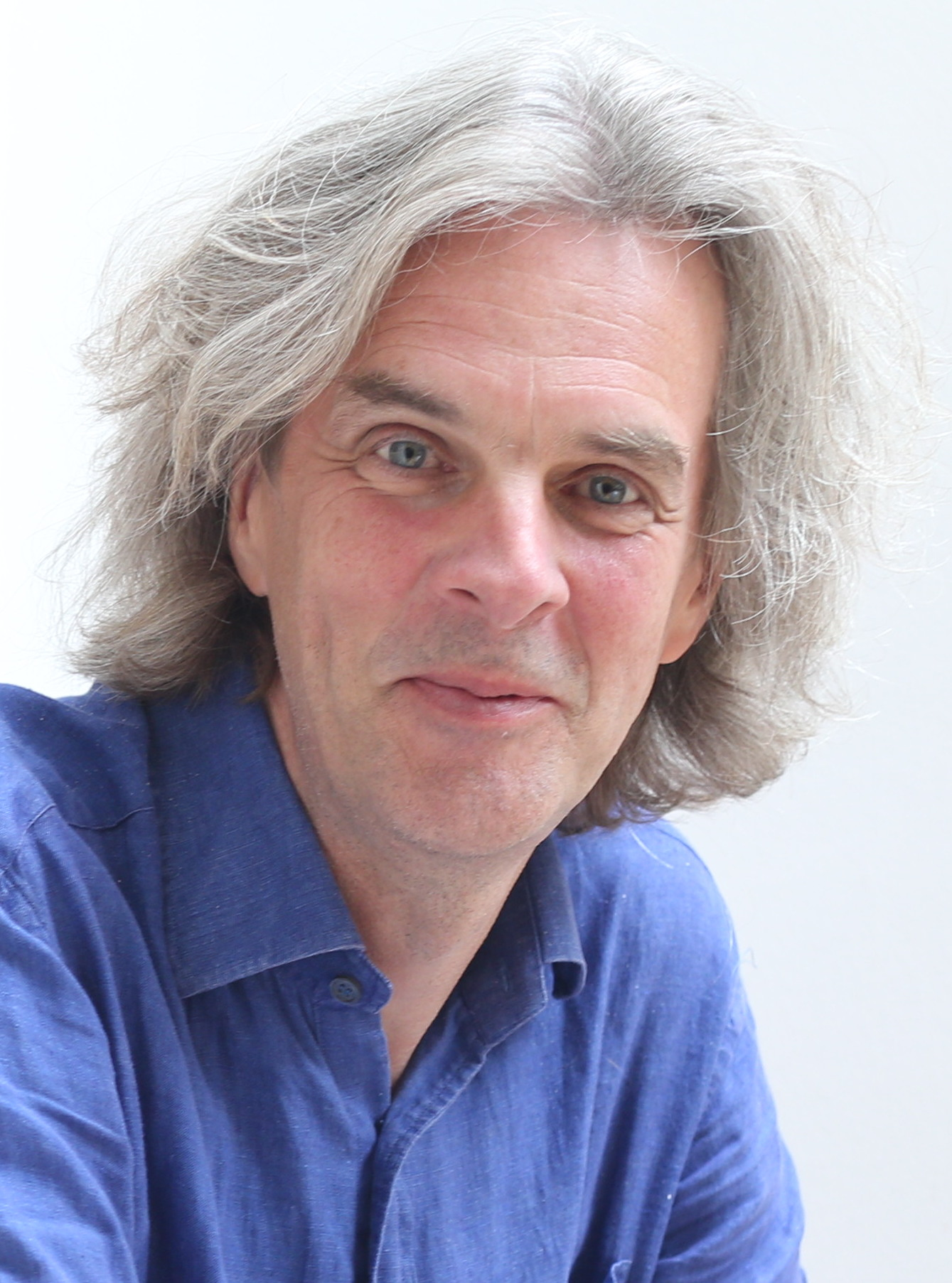
- Born: Peter James Stanford; 23 November 1961 (age 64); Macclesfield, England
- Education: St Anselm's College, Birkenhead
- Alma mater: Merton College, Oxford
- Occupations: Journalist; author; broadcaster
- Notable credits: Catholic Herald; The Daily Telegraph; The Tablet; Lord Longford
- Recorded at Stoke Newington Literary Festival 2013

Peter James Stanford (born 23 November 1961) is an English writer, editor, journalist and presenter, known for his biographies and writings on religion and ethics. His biography of Lord Longford was the basis for the 2006 BAFTA-winning film Longford starring Jim Broadbent in the title role. A former editor of the Catholic Herald newspaper, Stanford is also director of the Longford Trust for prison reform.

== Education and career ==
Born on 23 November 1961 in Macclesfield to Reginald and Mary Catherine Stanford, Peter Stanford was educated at St Anselm's College, Birkenhead, an Irish Christian Brothers school. He later read history at Merton College, Oxford. He began his journalistic career in 1983 at the Catholic weekly newspaper The Tablet. He was the editor of the Catholic Herald from 1988 to 1992. His resignation, to concentrate on writing books, coincided with the publication of Catholics and Sex, which he co-authored with fellow journalist Kate Saunders. They later presented a four-part TV series with the same title on Channel 4. It won a bronze medal at the New York International Television and Film Festival in 1993.

Subsequent TV and radio work includes presenting The Devil: An Unauthorised Biography (BBC1, 1996) and Pope Joan (BBC1, 1998), both based on his own books. He also presented the Channel 5 series The Mission (1997) and BBC Radio 2's Good Morning Sunday (2003 and 2004) as well as being a regular panellist on BBC Radio 4's The Moral Maze (1996) and Vice or Virtue (1997).

Stanford has written for The Sunday Times, The Guardian, The Observer and The Independent on Sunday, and has written a monthly column in The Tablet since 2003. He is a feature writer on the Daily Telegraph.

== Books ==
Since leaving the Catholic Herald, Stanford has written several biographies, travelogues and books on religion.

As well as his biography of Lord Longford, the subjects of his other biographies include the poet laureate C. Day-Lewis (2007), 1950s supermodel, peeress, and Catholic convert Bronwen Astor (2000), Cardinal Basil Hume, leader of the Catholic Church in England (1993) and Martin Luther (2017).

The Extra Mile (2010) is an account of his journey around Britain’s ancient holy shrines. How To Read a Graveyard (2013) is a tour of historic cemeteries in Britain and Continental Europe. The Devil: A Biography (1996), 50 Religious Ideas You Really Need To Know (2010) and Judas: The Troubling History of the Renegade Apostle (2015) were all translated into five languages. A collection of newspaper interviews he had done over three decades was published in 2018 as What We Talk About When We Talk About Faith.

In 2019, he published a “visible and invisible” history of Angels, and followed it in 2021 with If These Stones Could Talk, a history of Christianity in Britain and Ireland, which he tells through the story of 20 churches, one per century.

Gaudí: God's Architect (2026) is a biography of Antoni Gaudí that explores the complex connections between his religious faith and his famous buildings.

== Affiliations ==
Stanford, whose mother had multiple sclerosis, was chair of Aspire, Britain’s national charity for people with spinal cord injury, from 1991 until 2001 and again from 2005 until 2012.

In 2002, he joined with family and admirers of Lord Longford to establish the Frank Longford Charitable Trust, better known as The Longford Trust, which aims to continue the peer’s commitment to prison reform via an annual lecture, and annual prize as well as awarding scholarships for young former prisoners to go to university. He is also a patron of the CandoCo Dance Company.

Stanford also followed Lord Longford into the campaign for Moors Murderer Myra Hindley to be paroled from her life sentence, supporting the claims of those who argued that Hindley should be released from prison as she had rehabilitated and was no longer a threat to society. Hindley died in November 2002, after serving 36 years of her life sentence, as her original 25-year minimum term had been increased by a succession of Home Secretaries to 30 years and finally to a whole life tariff, and three appeals against this ruling in the High Court were rejected.

Stanford was a regular visitor to Hindley in prison during the final few years of her life, and agreed with the reports by prison and parole board officials who stated that Hindley was a reformed character who no longer posed a threat to society, and on this basis had qualified for parole.
