= Treaty of Washington (1900) =

1900 treaty between Spain and the United States

Treaty Between Spain and the United States for Cession of Outlying Islands of the Philippines
- Signed: November 7, 1900
- Location: Washington D.C.
- Effective: March 23, 1901
- Condition: Exchange of ratifications
- Parties: Spain; United States
- Citations: 31 Stat. 1942; TS 345; 11 Bevans 623
- Languages: Spanish; English

The Treaty of Washington of 1900 was signed in Washington, D.C., on November 7, 1900, and came into effect on March 23, 1901, when the ratifications were exchanged. The treaty sought to remove any ground of misunderstanding growing out of the interpretation of Article III of the 1898 Treaty of Paris by clarifying specifics of territories relinquished to the United States by Spain.

Both the 1898 and 1900 treaties were incorporated in the first article of the 1935 Constitution of the Philippines concerning the scope of the national territory.

== Provisions ==
The 1900 treaty states:

Spain relinquishes to the United States all title and claim of title, which she may have had at the time of the conclusion of the Treaty of Peace of Paris, to any and all islands belonging to the Philippine Archipelago, lying outside the lines described in Article III of that Treaty and particularly to the islands of Cagayan [Mapun], Sulu and Sibutu and their dependencies, and agrees that all such islands shall be comprehended in the cession of the Archipelago as fully as if they had been expressly included within those lines. A 1902 map published by the US government showing the new limits of the 1900 Treaty of Washington with Cagayan Sulú and Sibutú added https://commons.wikimedia.org/wiki/File:A_pronouncing_gazetteer_and_geographical_dictionary_of_the_Philippine_Islands,_United_States_of_America_with_maps,_charts_and_illustrations_%281902%29_%2814777855042%29.jpg

In consideration for that explicit statement of relinquishment, the United States agreed to pay to Spain the sum of one hundred thousand dollars ($100,000) within six months after the exchange of ratification. The Treaty of Washington is also known as the Cession Treaty.

== Use in territorial disputes ==
=== South China Sea islands ===
Antonio Carpio, a former Philippine associate justice, stated in 2024 that the 1900 treaty amended the 1898 Treaty of Paris by including several islands outside of the bounds of the 1898 treaty still under Spanish possession at the time, citing three maps published during the Spanish colonial era which included the two disputed areas as part of the Philippine territory. According to Carpio, by submitting a position paper recognizing the 1900 Treaty of Washington during the arbitration filed by the Philippines, China may have inadvertently supported the Philippine position by making a judicial admission (under the law, the highest form of admission) that Philippine territory is regulated by the Treaty of Washington and Spain also ceded to the United States "any and all islands belonging to the Philippine archipelago, lying outside the lines of the Treaty of Paris". China's 2014 position paper said that under these treaties, Philippine territory was "confined to the Philippine Islands, having nothing to do with any of China's maritime features in the South China Sea".

The Kalayaan islands (part of the Spratlys) and the Scarborough Shoal lie outside of the boundary of the 1898 Treaty of Paris and the 1961 Philippine baseline. The Kalayaans were later incorporated into Philippine law through Presidential Decree No. 1596 in 1978. Both were added to the baseline and treated as a "regime of islands" under Republic Act No. 9522, which was passed in 2009 in order to prevent the Philippines from losing its claims before a deadline under the United Nations Convention on the Law of the Sea. In 2015, Director of the Chinese Communist Party Central Committee Foreign Affairs Commission Office Wang Yi appeared in an East Asia Summit and an ASEAN Regional Forum with Foreign Ministers' Meetings. Referencing the Treaty of Paris in 1898, the Treaty of Washington in 1900, and the Convention Between the United States and Great Britain of 1930 which defined the territory of the Philippines, Yi claimed that Scarborough Shoal and the Spratly Islands are not Philippine territory.

Several of the islands and atolls within the area covered by the 1900 treaty are the subject of territorial disputes involving countries other than the Philippines and China. Two examples are Sand Cay and Southwest Cay, both claimed by Vietnam.

=== Batanes ===
A 2007 Taipei Times editorial by Prof. Chen Hurng-yu of Tamkang University triggered a minor dispute between the Philippines and Taiwan. Chen claimed that Taiwan has territorial claims over the province of Batanes, insisting that the island province lies outside the limits of the 1900 treaty, in contradiction to the viewpoints of Philippine political scholars that the province was covered in the 1900 treaty.

== See also ==
- German–Spanish Treaty (1899)
