= St Giles' Church, Camberwell =

Coordinates: 51.473°N 0.0869°W

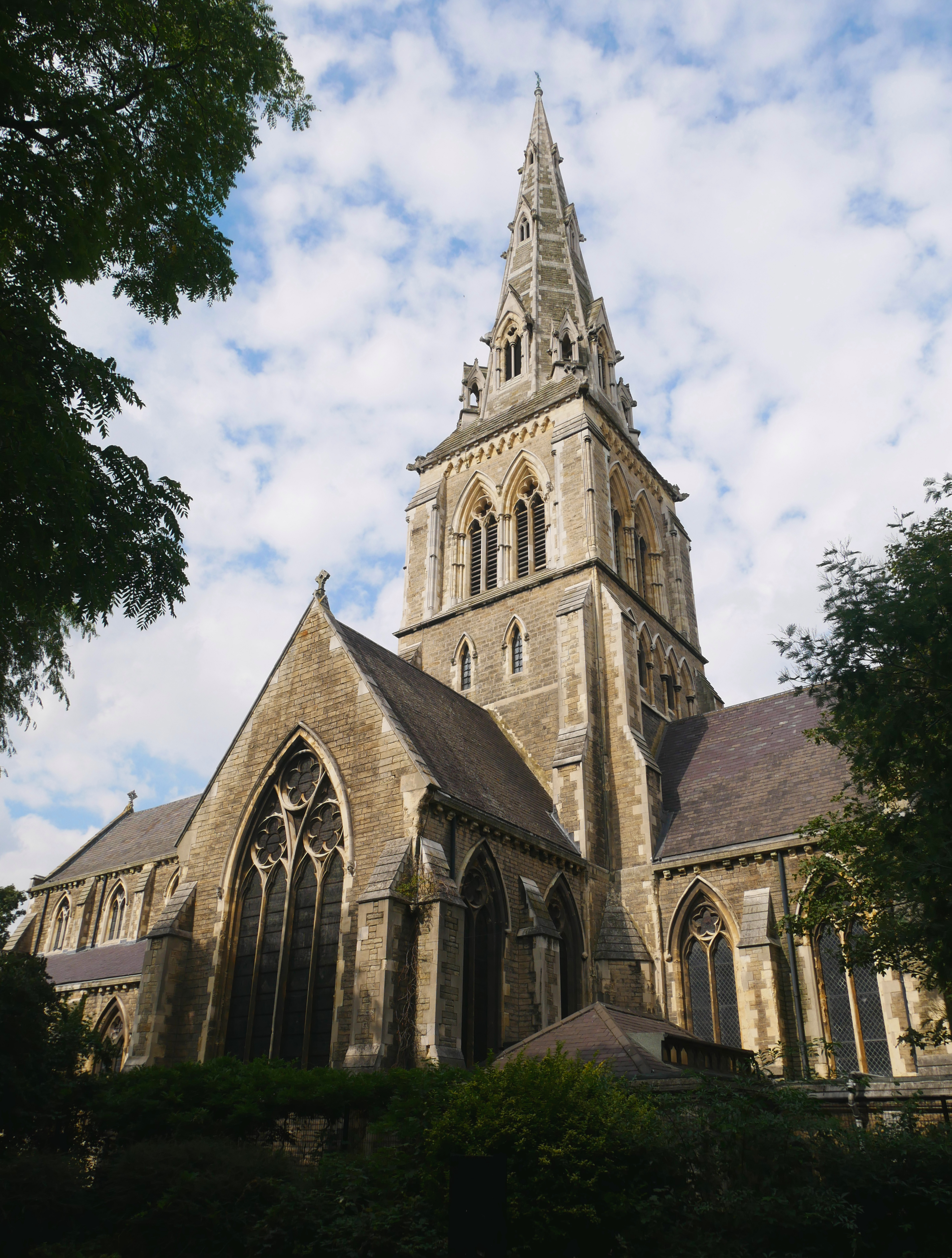
- St Giles' Church, Camberwell

- Location of St Giles'
- OS grid reference: TQ 32965 76633
- Country: England
- Denomination: Church of England
- Churchmanship: Anglo-Catholic
- Website: www.stgilescamberwell.org

History
- Founded: Before 1089
- Dedication: Saint Giles
- Consecrated: 21 November 1844 (present church)
- Events: Old church burnt down 7 February 1841; Rebuilt 1844

Architecture
- Heritage designation: Listed Grade II*
- Architect(s): Sir George Gilbert Scott (Moffatt and Scott)
- Architectural type: Parish church
- Style: Gothic Revival
- Construction cost: £24,000

Specifications
- Length: 152 feet (46 m)
- Materials: Kentish ragstone originally faced with stone from Caen in Normandy and Sneaton in Yorkshire, later refaced with Portland stone

Administration
- Province: Canterbury
- Diocese: Southwark
- Deanery: Camberwell
- Parish: Camberwell St Giles with St Matthew

Clergy
- Vicar: The Rev'd Nicholas George

St Giles' Church, Camberwell, is the parish church of Camberwell, a district of London which forms part of the London Borough of Southwark. It is part of Camberwell Deanery within the Anglican Diocese of Southwark in the Church of England. The church is dedicated to Saint Giles, the patron saint of disabled people. A local legend associates the dedication of St Giles with a well near Camberwell Grove, which may also have given Camber-well its name. An article on the church from 1827 states: "it has been conjectured that the well might have been famous for some medicinal virtues and might have occasioned the dedication of the church to this patron saint of cripples."

== History ==
The ancient parish stretched from Boundary Lane, just north of the present Albany Road, south as far as Sydenham Hill. The Anglo-Saxon church on the site of St Giles', and recorded in the Domesday Book, was almost certainly built of wood and stood amongst fields and woodland. The church was later rebuilt in stone by William FitzRobert, Earl of Gloucester and Lord of the Manor of Camberwell. Numerous alterations and extensions took place over the next three hundred years and by the 18th century, the church was crammed with box pews.

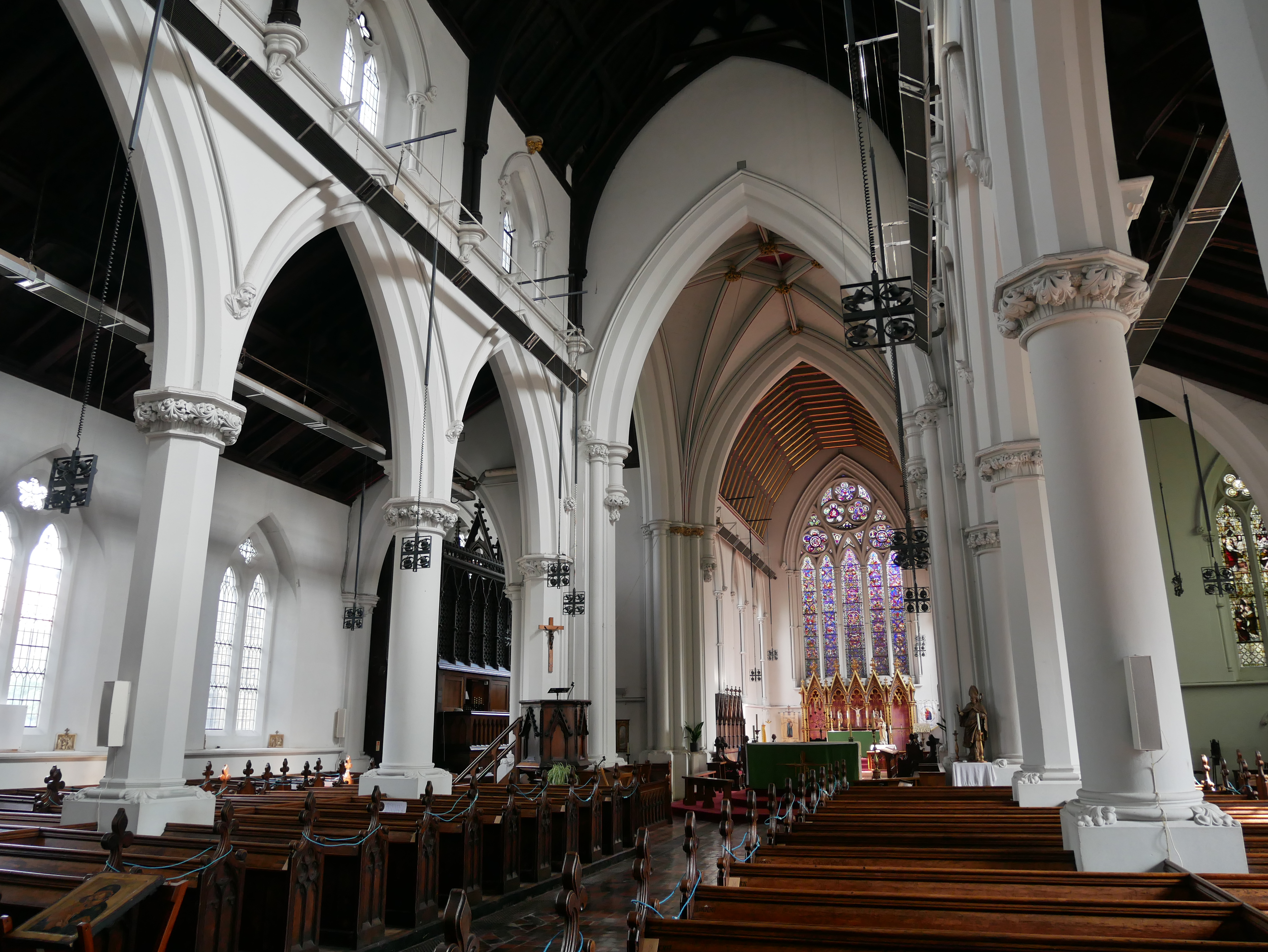
The nave of the Church of Saint Giles, Camberwell

On 7 February 1841 a devastating fire, caused by a faulty heating system and fuelled by the wooden pews and galleries, virtually destroyed the medieval church. The heat was so great that stained glass melted and stone crumbled to powder. Immediately after the fire, a competition to choose the architect for the new church produced 53 designs and was won by the firm of Scott and Moffat. St Giles' was one of the first major Gothic buildings by George Gilbert Scott, best known as architect of St Pancras Station and the Albert Memorial.

The new church was consecrated on 21 November 1844 by the diocesan Bishop of Winchester. The church was built to a cruciform shape with a central tower surmounted by an octagonal spire of 210 feet (64 m). Much of the facing stone was imported from Caen in Normandy, but by the 1870s the majority of this stone was removed due to decay caused by pollution. Appreciating his mistake, Scott paid for the church to be refaced with Portland stone which was more suitable for the London atmosphere.

The church suffered considerably in the Second World War with many of the stained-glass windows being destroyed. Just over 100 years after the re-facing, stone began to fall from the spire and major vertical cracks threatened its structural integrity. In June 2000, the top 72 feet (22 m) of the spire was taken down and rebuilt at a cost of £1,000,000. In 2026, the clock mechanism controlling the hourly clock chimes from the belltower was restored to working order after not working for several decades.

== Architecture and interior ==
St Giles' Church is laid out in a cruciform plan and has gabled transepts. The nave has a clerestory and lower aisles with five bays and gabled entrance porches. The interior has an arch-braced roof and a lierne vault at the crossing. The nave is flanked by alternately round and octagonal columns with foliated capitals. The south transept is used as the Lady Chapel and the north transept holds the organ.

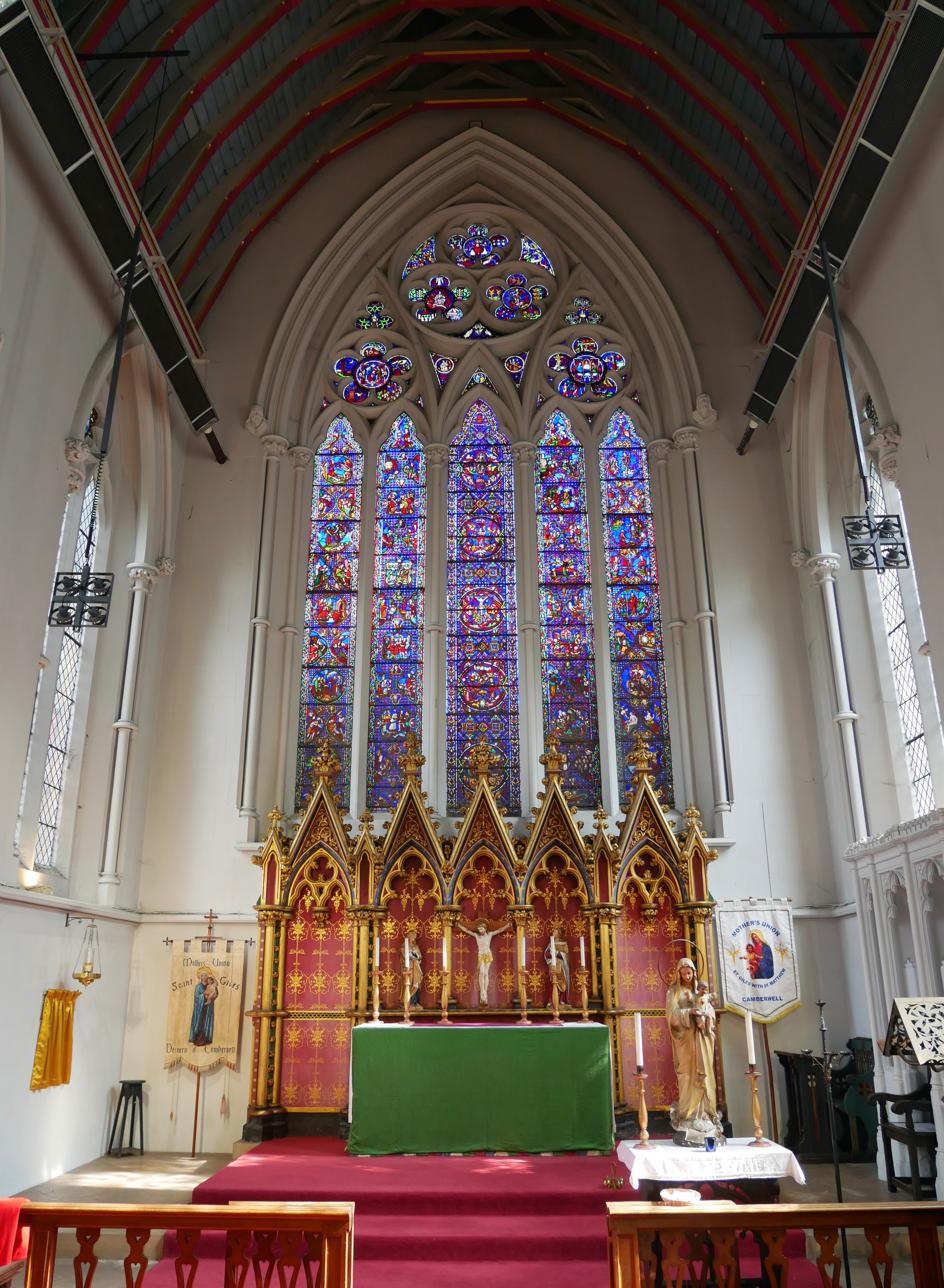
Chancel of St Giles' Church

The 19th-century church features a sedilla and piscina on the south side of the Lady Chapel which date from the 14th century, both remnants of the mediaeval church. Further remains of the old church are visible in the former vicarage garden on Benhill Road, where a mediaeval porch stands. This originally housed the sedilla piscina which were moved into the rebuilt church in 1916; the mediaeval porch is today used to house bins for the local youth club.

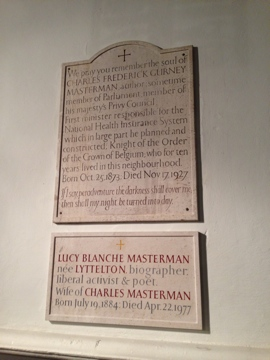
Plaque to Charles Masterman and his wife Lucy

On the North side is a plaque by Eric Gill commemorating Charles Masterman (1873–1927), instigator of the National Health Insurance system (the precursor of the NHS) and his family.

Beneath the present church lies the 300-year-old crypt. The original graves and tombs were removed and the various rooms were refurbished to house 'The Camberwell Samaritans'. The crypt was opened in its new role by Queen Elizabeth, The Queen Mother in February, 1962. The Samaritans provided emergency relief and support for the large number of local homeless men in the area. The Camberwell Samaritans later became the St Giles Trust which continues to operate in Camberwell Church Street, a few minutes walk away from the church. The crypt itself is now used as an arts venue and jazz club.

== Stained glass ==
St Giles' Church contains some notable stained-glass windows. The William Morris windows in the South transept were destroyed by wartime bombing, and were replaced in 1956 by windows designed by Ninian Comper depicting St Giles, St Nicholas, St Alphege and St Thomas Beckett above, with St Swithin and Bishops Lancelot Andrewes, Anthony Thorold and Edward Talbot below.

The great East Window was designed by the polymath and art critic John Ruskin, a resident of Herne Hill, and Edmund Oldfield. It depicts biblical scenes from the Creation to the End of Time. Ruskin visited a number of mediaeval French cathedrals including Chartres to gain inspiration. The glass was made by Ward and Nixon.

In the chancel are angel windows by Lavers & Barraud. The West window is also by Ward & Nixon, incorporating 13th century glass originally from Trier.

== Organ ==
The organ at St Giles' is a historically significant instrument, designed by Samuel Sebastian Wesley. Before embarking on his career as a cathedral organist and composer, Wesley, one of Samuel Wesley's seven children, was organist for several years in the old church of St Giles'. After the 1841 fire, Wesley returned to St Giles' to design the new organ in 1844 and played it at the opening recital.

The three-manual organ was constructed by James Chapman Bishop, a British organ builder founded in 1807 which as Bishop & Son remains one of the oldest and last surviving organ builders in the country. Bishop & Sons continues to service and maintain the St Giles' organ to this day. The organ underwent restoration in 1890 and again in 1960. Although it has undergone some adaptations, it retains its original mechanical 'tracker' action, albeit operated electro-pneumatically since the 1960 work.

=== 2015 restoration ===
In 2015, St Giles' Church embarked upon a major appeal to raise £500,000 in order to overhaul and restore the organ. Much of the 1960s electrical system is beyond repair and the organ's pipes require significant restoration. As part of the fundraising campaign there was a world record attempt by the Director of Music and organist at St Giles', Ashley Valentine, who attempted to set the world record for the "longest marathon church organ playing" in June 2015.

== Church bells ==
St Giles' has a ring of ten bells cast in 1844 by the firm of Mears at the Whitechapel Bell Foundry. The largest, the Tenor, weights 24 cwt (1,220 kg).
