= Thomas P. O'Neill (historian) =

Irish historian

- Born: Thomas Patrick O'Neill; 1 November 1921; Ballon, County Carlow
- Died: 1 March 1996 (aged 74); St Vincent's Hospital, Dublin
- Known for: biographer of James Fintan Lalor and Éamon de Valera

Thomas P. O'Neill (Irish: Tomás Ó Néill 1 November 1921 – 1 March 1996) was an Irish historian, noted for his biographies of James Fintan Lalor (1962) and Éamon de Valera (1970).

== Early life and family ==
Thomas Patrick O'Neill was born in Ballon, County Carlow on 1 November 1921. He was one of three sons of Thomas O'Neill, a farmer, and his wife, Anna Maria (née Murphy). He attended the local national school, and then Knockbeg College. He went on to study in University College Dublin (UCD), graduating with an MA in 1946.

He was married twice, first to Máiread O'Connor. Following O'Connor's death in 1963, in 1965 he married Marie Hughes, solicitor, civil servant, and fellow historian. He had three daughters and three sons.

== Career ==
A condensed version of his Masters dissertation was published as a chapter in The great famine (1956) edited by R. D. Edwards and T. D. Williams. In fact as documented by Cormac O Gráda, R.D. Edwards relied on his post graduate student for much of the structuring of that work, and O'Neill was able to contribute a chapter of his choosing. Sections relating to relief works were omitted, but O'Neill published these as journal articles, one of the few professional historians to study this aspect of the Irish famine at the time. He is credited with pioneering use of archival material, with one criticism of the chapter being that he focused on the famine relief administrators and not the recipients. His work was the foundation on which further work analysing the relief effort was subsequently built. As well as contributing this chapter, O'Neill was also involved in the overall formatting of the volume, and devised the questionnaire sent out by the Irish Folklore Commission. It was from this questionnaire that Roger McHugh wrote up a chapter on the folk memories of the famine, and statistical maps were devised from the data which also appeared in the volume.

O'Neill was appointed assistant keeper of printed books at the National Library of Ireland (NLI) in 1947, leading to him developing an unparalleled knowledge of the manuscript material in the collections. Under the pen-name Lionel Thomas, he wrote for the Anti-Partition Campaign. As a fellow of the Library Association of Ireland, O'Neill published a pamphlet Sources of Irish local history in 1958. It was a collection of eight articles from the LAI's journal, An Leabharlann, looking at types of sources and how librarians could use them to aid local historians written as "a user-friendly manual". The pamphlet remained a critical research tool for local historians for a long time. While at the National Library he acted as historical adviser on the documentary films about the 1916 Rising and the War of Independence, Mise Éire (released in 1959) and Saoirse(released 1961).

O'Neill published an Irish language biography of James Fintan Lalor in 1962. O'Neill could both speak and write in Irish, but was heavily assisted by Donncha Ó Céileachair in getting this book to a publishing standard. This biography drew on previously unused newspaper and archival sources, and is still regarded as the standard text on Lalor. Among the discoveries that O'Neill made was that Lalor had corresponded with Sir Robert Peel regarding his animosity towards the repeal movements and made proposals to quash it with land reform. O'Neill was encouraged to suppress some less favourable facts about Lalor he uncovered, but he refused.

Due to his earlier work, and possibly also because he had worked with Frank Gallagher in the NLI, O'Neill was approached to work on the authorised biography of Éamon de Valera following the death of the previous author, Frank Gallagher, in 1962. Gallagher had only completed a few chapters on the Anglo-Irish treaty negotiations. A contract for the work was signed in 1962, and O'Neill was formally seconded to the presidential staff. He conducted long, regular interviews with de Valera, working directly in Áras an Uachtaráin for a period to have direct and easy access to de Valera's private papers. O'Neill would develop a rapport with de Valera and his family, leading to him remaining in contact with them for the rest of his life. In 1968 and 1970, the biography was published in the Irish language in two volumes, with an t-Athair Pádraig Ó Fiannachta as co-author. The English language version was published in 1970 with Lord Longford as O'Neill's co-author. The addition of Lord Longford was by the publishers, as they believed a high profile name would boost sales. The English version of the biography differs somewhat from the Irish language version, only partly due to the new co-author: unlike the Irish version, it brings the story right up to events contemporary with its publication, commenting on the formation of the European Union which Ireland was then planning to join.

O'Neill was appointed lecturer in history at University College Galway in 1967, eventually becoming associate professor. Due to his spontaneous lecturing style, enthusiasm for his subject and engagement with those he taught, he was popular with the students. He was also heavily involved in the growth of extension or extra mural lecturing outside the college from 1970, often lecturing to local history societies. O'Neill believed that local historians were of great importance, as they would often find information unknown to their professional counterparts, and he treated these local historians with respect, giving over time to answer their queries. Even after his retirement to Dublin in 1987, he remained in touch with those in involved in local journalism and the Galway Family History Project.

While based in Galway, in 1972 he participated in the controversy known as the Battle of the Books, when the Law Society of Ireland proposed and duly executed the highly controversial sale of contents of the King's Inns Library. Having protested vehemently against such a sell-off by the legal professional body of Ireland, he joined with, among others, Nick Robinson (husband of Mary Robinson), then head of An Taisce, to raise some funds and purchase some of those items for the Irish state.

In 1984, he suggested to the Galway City Manager of the time, Seamus Keating, that there should be a significant celebration of the 500th anniversary of Galway's first charter, having discovered the original document in the British Library in 1947. They took the idea to Galway Corporation, who embraced it as a means of encouraging cultural celebrations and developing Galway's tourism. He toured the United States twice with the Galway mayor, Michael Leahy, and the city manager publicising the "Quincentennial". The success of the event, both financially and culturally, led to other cities marking their own similar anniversaries. As part of Galway's celebrations, O'Neill published a weekly column on Galway history in the Galway Advertiser. The column was originally intended to finish in 1984, but was so popular that O'Neill continued to write it until his death.

== Later life and death ==
Following his retirement and return to Dublin, O'Neill spent a great deal of time in the NLI and was active in a number of historical bodies such as the Royal Society of Antiquaries of Ireland, the Catholic Record Society of Ireland, and the Carlow Historical & Archaeological Society. He had been conducting research into the Registry of Deeds, which never appeared as a written work, but he was awarded the medal of the Old Dublin Society for his 1983 lecture on the impact of the penal laws on Dublin property ownership. Towards the end of his life, he expressed a wish to revisit and expand on his work on the famine, wanting to counter any revisionist narratives that may diminish the negative role of the English government in the events. His last public appearance was to launch Gréithe Den Ghorta, a collection of Radió na Gaeltachta talks by Cathal Poirtéir.

O'Neill died on 1 March 1996 in St Vincent's Hospital, Dublin after a long illness due to cancer. His papers were bequeathed to the NLI. He is buried in Shanganagh Cemetery.
