= St Giles Trust =

- Founded: 1962
- Purpose: Uses expertise and 'lived experience' to empower those who are not getting the help they need.
- Location: London, United Kingdom
- Website: www.stgilestrust.org.uk

St Giles Trust is a charity helping people impacted by poverty, violence & exploitation and the justice system.

== History ==
The organisation was established in 1962 by Fr. John Nicholls as The Camberwell Samaritans in the crypt of St Giles church in Camberwell, south London, offering relief and support to the large number of destitute people in the parish. This included emergency relief and support for the large number of homeless men in the area - a prevailing feature of the area at that time due to many local hostels and workhouses, including the infamous Camberwell Spike on Gordon Road. The Trust formally dissolved its ties to the church in the 1970s.

In 1995 it moved to its current headquarters in Georgian House, Camberwell Church Street and became known as the Southwark Day Centre. In 1998, St Giles started to offer housing casework in HMP Wandsworth. Over the next decade, the prisons work grew along with a range of other services both in prison and in the community.

Today, it has expanded beyond criminal justice to help for young people involved in or at risk of criminal exploitation, improve employability amongst adults and young people .

== St Giles' vision and lived experience ==
St Giles state that their vision is to "see a society where everyone - no matter what their background - has a positive future."

Underpinning all the charity's services is its lived experience ecosystem - training, supporting and developing people with lived experience of adverse disadvantage. The ecosystem maps the ways in which lived experience is embedded and working as an interconnected system - across individuals, workforce, organisational culture, service delivery, and systemic influence.

The origins of this work were in the early 2000s in HMP Wandsworth, training serving prisoners to become qualified advice workers, providing services and support to other prisoners. Originally intended as a practical measure to stem the large flow of prison leavers leaving prison and seeking support at the charity's HQ in Camberwell, the service grew over the next decade to be delivered in the community and with a wider range of individuals.

The National Lottery Community Fund (TNLCF) were a key funder of this work. In April 2019, St Giles was awarded £3.6 million from the TNLCF to establish a network of Peer Hubs across the UK to enable people from disadvantaged backgrounds the opportunity to train as Peer Advisors and support other local organisations.

In 2024, St Giles Cymru were awarded funding from the Welsh Government Strategic Volunteering Grant, developing opportunities that put lived experience at the centre of how services are designed and delivered across Wales. As part of this St Giles have been able to develop a Lived Experience Toolkit, introducing individuals and organisations to a lived experience model.

== Services provided ==
St Giles Trust provides specialist services in the following areas:

- Work with children and young people involved in or at risk of criminal exploitation
- Services helping adults and young people facing unemployment and poverty
- Prison and community-based support for people in the criminal justice system

Notable developments in 2026 include their involvement in the multi-agency Women's Alliance Service Flourish in North Yorkshire supporting women in the justice system (announced in June 2026) and their involvement in the Youth Futures Foundation's Building Futures Programme providing trusted adult mentoring support to young people at risk of becoming NEET (not in employment, education or training).

In a new development to the charity's lived experience ecosystem, St Giles Cymru partnered with National Trust for Wales to create heritage volunteers with lived experience at the Aberdulais former tinworks heritage site. The work was awarded a National Lottery Heritage Fund grant in April 2026

== Locations ==
St Giles' head office is based in Camberwell, South London. Their work is based in schools, prisons, hospitals and communities across England and Wales.

== Media and Campaigns ==
The Times has covered St Giles' work addressing and preventing child criminal exploitation. In March 2026, they carried a feature on the charity's work supporting young people out of county line exploitation In April 2025, a similar feature on their trusted adult mentoring work for young people was profiled as part of a wider feature on knife crime.

In February 2025, their hospital based violence reduction work was featured in a BBC documentary on knife crime presented by actor Idris Elba. The same project featured in an earlier BBC London documentary London's Bleeding presented by Clive Myrie.

Their work supporting young people impacted by criminal exploitation in the West Midlands was highlighted in Channel 4's Trapped in a Gang.

In October 2026 the charity marked the 20th anniversary of its work addressing violence & exploitation. In the run up to this, the charity presented a series of free online learning sessions presented by Dr Junior Smart OBE, FCGI - the founder of their original SOS Project which has since developed into the charity's national violence & exploitation work. Aimed at professionals working with children and young people, these sessions aimed to raise awareness and equip professionals with the tools to recognise the signs of exploitation, understand the issues around it and improve safeguarding and engagement.

In July 2025 St Giles launched Safe Summer, Strong Futures - a campaign aimed at raising awareness of the risks child and young people face when the safe space of school is removed.

In July 2021 St Giles launched a campaign to raise awareness of child criminal exploitation. Exploitation of children is often used to facilitate county lines drug running, whereby vulnerable children and adults are groomed and coerced into trafficking and dealing drugs on behalf of criminal gangs. Alongside drugs, other illegal economies such as human and sex trafficking are also implicated in county lines.

== Awards and Accolades for staff ==
In June 2026, Maria McNicholl who established the charity's original Peer Advisor Programme in HMP Wandsworth in 2002 was awarded an MBE in recognition of her work in prisons.

The charity's Footsteps Project helping women in the justice system in Yorkshire won the Skills for Justice Awards in September 2025.

St Giles has won The Charity Awards 2009 and 2007, The Third Sector Excellence Awards 2007, The Butler Trust Awards 2009, The Justice Awards 2009, The Centre for Social Justice Awards 2009 and the Andy Ludlow Awards 2007.

It has also been included in the Sunday Times Best 100 Companies to Work For since 2009.

Its SOS Project working with young people involved in gangs won the Advice, Support and Advocacy category of the Charity Awards of 2014. In November 2014, Mona Morrison of St Giles received the Highly Commended Longford Prize, in recognition of successful projects with youth gangs. Its peer-led work with foreign national prisoners won second prize of the Robin Corbett Awards for Prisoner Rehabilitation in 2016. The 2017 Longford Prize for Outstanding Achievement went to David Jolie of St Giles, while CJ Burge from the SOS team was runner up Criminal Justice Champion at the Howard League's awards. In 2019, Lee Dutton from St Giles' south Wales office was commended in the Butler Trust awards for his work with families with complex needs. In 2022, London Skills and Employment Manager Brendan Ross was awarded the Longford Prize.

== Patrons ==
St Giles' current and former patrons are:

- Lord Phillips of Matravers
- Jenny Agutter
- Lord Gus O'Donnell
- Christine Ohuruogu
- Sam Bailey
- Mark Tennant
- Martin P Griffiths
- Martine Rose
- Freddie Fox
- Baron Hogan-Howe

== Royal patronage ==
The charity has had a long association with royalty. In 1963, the original day centre, one of the first of it kind, was opened by Queen Elizabeth The Queen Mother. In 1995, her grandson, Prince Charles, opened the new day centre at Georgian House. To mark the charity's 50th anniversary year in 2012, Prince William was named patron of the year.
