= Longford Greyhound Stadium =

Former greyhound racing venue in County Longford, Ireland

- Interactive map of Longford Greyhound Stadium
- Location: Park Road, Longford, County Longford, Ireland
- Coordinates: 53°43′14″N 7°47′36″W
- Date opened: 1939
- Date closed: 2020
- Race type: greyhound racing

Longford Greyhound Stadium was a greyhound racing track located on the south side of Longford, County Longford, Ireland.

The stadium was a ten-minute walk from the town centre and had a large customer car park. Racing took place every Monday and Friday evening and the facilities included a fast food bar and totalisator betting. Race distances were 525, 550, 750 and 805 yards.

== History ==
Longford Greyhound Stadium was accessed via Earl Street and was the most centrally located track in Ireland. The south Longford venue had a circumference of 485 yards and opened in May 1939. It was organised by two men called Matthew J. Lyons (a local businessman) and John E. Dorris (managing director) who purchased the Sligo greyhound operation and brought it to Longford.

Initially the stadium opened for a racing season, starting in the Spring and closing before Winter each year. The track hosted the Longford Derby & Longford Puppy Derby and other events to have taken place previously here are the Padian Cup and Smithwicks 550.

In July 1966, John McDermott died aged 73, he had been the manager of the track from its opening night. A later pioneer of the track was Jim Conroy (racing manager). Also in 1966, the track closed for the winter break and looked unlikely to re-open, but the owner Thomas Packenham sold the site to Longford Sports Ltd.

In 1974, the track only raced on Friday nights due to the effect of the 1973 oil crisis. In September 1985, the Longford Greyhound Supporters Club was formed.

In June 1989, the track celebrated its 50th anniversary with a special a meeting that was attended by Frank Berry (jockey), Larry Cunningham, Eddie Macken and Ray Flynn.

In the new millennium, the track battled for survival during hard financial climates, led by Racing Manager Patrick Farrington and the voluntary committee. In July 2014, the sale of the Park Road track was agreed to Scottish-based greyhound owner Howard Wallace.

In 2018, it was announced that the track was closing for good but it gained a reprieve.

In 2020, the stadium closed as a result of the COVID-19 pandemic and never recovered from the financial loss, holding its last meeting on 23 March 2020.

== Competitions ==
- Longford Derby
- Longford Puppy Derby

== Track records ==
At closing

| Yards | Greyhound | Time | Date | Notes |
|---|---|---|---|---|
| 330 | Bay Sun | 17.33 | 11.07.2008 | |
| 525 | Dustin Fox | 28.15 | 14 July 2006 | |
| 550 | Tyrur Harold | 29.45 | 16 June 2017 | |
| 570 | Frisky Fantasy | 30.73 | 2 August 2010 | |
| 805 | Posh Again | 44.87 | 11 July 2008 | |

Former

| Yards | Greyhound | Time | Date | Notes |
|---|---|---|---|---|
| 330 | Richmont Mick | 18.69 | 1950 | |
| 330 | Portumna Bouncer | 18.44 | 11 July 1969 | |
| 330 | Scaragh Prairie | 18.32 | 30 August 1974 | |
| 330 | Cast No Stones | 18.22 | 24 May 1985 | |
| 330 | Tubbercurry Lad | 18.22 | 12 July 1985 | |
| 330 | Athboy Vintage | 17.69 | 20 July 2001 | |
| 330 | Comans Express | 17.68 | 10 June 2002 | |
| 330 | Silkey Joe | 17.62 | 11 July 2003 | |
| 330 | Lethal Party | 17.61 | 7 October 2005 | |
| 330 | Petes Noble | 17.59 | 21 October 2005 | |
| 330 | Duke of Ross | 17.52 | 9 December 2005 | |
| 330 | Gingko | 17.35 | 13 July 2007 | |
| 525 | Cooleeny Twister | 29.98 | c.1948 | |
| 525 | Lovely Rambler | 29.38 | 2 July 1965 | |
| 525 | Sampson Flash | 29.28 | 5 July 1974 | Longford Derby final |
| 525 | Pepsi Princess | 28.82 | 1 September 1989 | |
| 525 | Athboy Vintage | 28.27 | 10 August 2001 | |
| 525 | Get Here | 28.26 | 19 July 2002 | |
| 525 | Dundrum Prince | 28.21 | 18 June 2004 | |
| 525 | Hi King Closure | 28.19 | 17 June 2005 | |
| 550 | Design | 31.15 | 1970 | |
| 550 | Claddagh Quail | 31.04 | 11 September 1970 | |
| 550 | Bermadaghs Shay | 30.80 | 17 July 1985 | |
| 550 | Break The Clock | 29.78 | 1 August 2003 | |
| 550 | Coolamber Prunty | 29.77 | 11 July 2008 | |
| 550 | Pepsi Kev | 29.77 | 3 October 2008 | |
| 550 | Rince Boy | 29.76 | 20 October 2008 | |
| 550 | Bunlahy Brett | 29.66 | 2 August 2010 | |
| 550 | Clydal Jack | 29.63 | 21 June 2013 | Longford Derby second round |
| 550 | Surley Bassi | 29.51 | 20 June 2014 | |
| 570 | Angel Wonder | 32.85 | 9 June 1967 | |
| 570 | Couch Trip | 31.04 | 28 September 2001 | |
| 570 | Emdee Boys | 30.92 | 13 May 2002 | |
| 570 | Dundrum Prince | 30.80 | 1 April 2005 | |
| 570 | Dunsany | 30.88 | 1 April 2005 | |
| 570 | Dundrum Prince | 30.74 | 5 April 2005 | |
| 600 | Danba | 34.67 | 14 April 1967 | |
| 805 | Thanks Jim | 46.98 | August 1991 | |
| 805 | Clydal Pigeon | 45.89 | 30 September 2003 | |
| 805 | Hidden Solo | 45.10 | 5 December 2003 | |
| 330 H | Benas Gift | 19.95 | c.1940 | |
| 330 H | Cave View Clipper | 19.48 | 23 October 1959 | |
| 525 H | Fortwilliam Pagan | 31.44 | c.1941 | |
