= Kalayaan =

Kalayaan, is a Filipino word for "liberty" or "freedom". It may refer to:

- Kalayaan, Laguna, a municipality in the Philippines
- Kalayaan, Palawan, a municipality in the Philippines
  - Kalayaan Islands part of the disputed Spratly Islands in the South China Sea / West Philippine Sea
- Kalayaan Avenue, a major thoroughfare in Metro Manila, Philippines
- Kalayaan (charity), a British advocacy group for migrant domestic workers
- Kalayaan, the official publication of the Filipino revolutionary group Katipunan
