= Michelene Wandor =

English dramatist and poet (born 1940)

- Born: Michelene Dinah Samuels; 20 April 1940 (age 86); Essex, England
- Other name: Michelene Victor
- Education: Newnham College, Cambridge; University of Essex; Trinity College of Music
- Occupations: Playwright, critic, broadcaster, poet, lecturer, and musician
- Spouse: Ed Victor (m. 1963; div. 1975)
- Children: 2
- Website: www.michelenewandor.co.uk

Michelene Dinah Wandor (née Samuels; born 20 April 1940), known from 1963 to at least 1979 as Michelene Victor, is an English playwright, critic, broadcaster, poet, lecturer, and musician.

== Birth and education ==
She was born Michelene Samuels in Essex, England, in 1940. Her parents, Abraham Samuels and Rosalia Wander, were early 20th-century Russian Jewish émigrés.

After attending Chingford Secondary Modern and High Schools, Wandor studied English at Newnham College, Cambridge, graduating in 1962. She also has master's degrees from the University of Essex (Sociology of Literature 1975–76) and in Music from London University/Trinity College of Music, London.

== Career ==
Wandor has been active in the Women's Liberation Movement since 1969 and edited its first collection of essays, The Body Politic, in 1972. Once a Feminist followed in 1990 and is an oral history of the previous 20 years. She was poetry editor of the original Time Out magazine from 1971 to 1982. Her own writing encompasses poetry, short stories, essays, fiction and non-fiction books, plays and radio dramatisations.

In 1982, her work (together with that of Michèle Roberts and Judith Kazantzis) was included in Touch Papers: Three Women Poets, published by Allison and Busby.

In 1987, Wandor became the first woman to have a play performed on one of the main stages (Lyttelton Theatre) of the National Theatre, The Wandering Jew (from the 1844 novel of the same name by Eugène Sue). Wandor has adapted numerous novels for BBC Radio since the late 1970s, including works by Jane Austen, Margaret Drabble, George Eliot, Rudyard Kipling, and Frances Hodgson Burnett.

In addition, Wandor has written two theatre studies: Carry On, Understudies: Theatre and Sexual Politics (1986, expanded version of Understudies, 1981) and Post-war British Drama: Looking Back in Gender (2001, original edition Look Back in Gender, 1987). For Methuen she has edited four collections of Plays by Women. She also edited the volume of essays On Gender and Writing (Pandora Press, 1983).

Her collection of short stories False Relations appeared in 2004.

Wandor describes herself as "a good Jewish atheist". Her recent poetry reflects her background and the history of Jews in England. Music of the Prophets (2007) commemorates the 350th anniversary of the Jews' return to England in 1657 in the era of Cromwell.

A trained early musician, Wandor performs Renaissance and Baroque music with the group "The Siena Ensemble", and has broadcast and recorded in this role.

Wandor has taught at London's Guildhall School of Music and Drama, London Metropolitan University and comparable institutions abroad. At Lancaster University she is currently a lecturer in Creative Writing. In 2008, Macmillan published Wandor's thoughts on this subject, The Author Is Not Dead, Merely Somewhere Else: Creative Writing Reconceived.

== Personal life ==
Michelene Wandor married literary agent Ed Victor in 1963; the couple had two sons, but divorced in 1975. She later had a relationship with politician and trade unionist David Triesman, until they split up in the late 1990s.

== Selected bibliography ==
- Lilac Flinder – Concrete poetry (Writers' Forum, 1973)
- Cutlasses & Earrings – Editor and contributor to anthology of poetry by women (Playbooks, 1977)
- Upbeat – Poems and stories (Journeyman Press, 1981)
- Touch Papers – Poetry collection, with Judith Kazantzis and Michèle Roberts (Allison & Busby, 1982)
- Gardens of Eden – poems for Eve and Lilith (Journeyman Press, 1984)
- Carry On, Understudies: Theatre & Sexual Politics (First edition, Methuen, 1981. Revised, expanded and updated, Routledge, 1986)
- Look Back in Gender – The family and sexuality in post-war British drama (1987). Revised and expanded as Post-war British Drama: Looking Back in Gender (Routledge, 2001)
- Gardens of Eden – Collected poems (Random Century, 1990)
- Gardens of Eden Revisited – New edition, with new poems (Five Leaves, 1999)
- False Relations – collection of short stories (Five Leaves, 2004)
- Musica Transalpina – Poetry Collection (Arc Publications, 2005). Poetry Book Society Recommendation, Spring 2006.
- The Music of the Prophets – narrative poem about the resettlement of the Jews in England, 1655–56 (Arc Publications, 2006)
- The Author is not Dead, Merely Somewhere Else: Creative Writing Reconceived (Palgrave Macmillan, 2008)
- The Art of Writing Drama: Theory and Practice (Methuen Publishing, 2008)
- Orfeo's Last Act: a novel in two parts (Greenwich Exchange, 2023)
