= Ed Victor =

American literary agent (1939–2017)

Ed Victor CBE
- Born: Edward Victor; 9 September 1939; New York City, US
- Died: 7 June 2017 (aged 77); London, England
- Education: Bayside High School; Dartmouth College; Pembroke College, Cambridge
- Occupation: Literary agent
- Spouses: Michelene Wandor (m. 1963; div. 1975): Carol Ryan
- Children: 3

Edward Victor CBE (9 September 1939 – 7 June 2017) was an American-born British literary agent, based, for most of his career, in London, England.

== Early life and education ==
Victor was born on 9 September 1939, in Bronx, New York City. The son of Russian-Jewish immigrant parents, who ran a photographic equipment store, he went to Bayside High School in the borough of Queens, later earning a bachelor's degree from Dartmouth College. After graduating, he attended Pembroke College, University of Cambridge, on a Marshall Scholarship in 1961.

== Career ==
=== Publishing editor ===
Victor married Michelene Samuels, the writer, in 1963; the couple made their home in London and had two children. Victor worked for the Oborne Press, a publishing house, then part of Lord Beaverbrook's Express Newspapers group. He then worked on coffee table books for Weidenfeld & Nicolson. After approaching George Weidenfeld in the toilet, Victor was moved to general publishing, looking after the works of Saul Bellow and Vladimir Nabokov.

==== Ink ====
In 1970, his first marriage ended in divorce. In 1971, Victor co-founded the countercultural newspaper Ink with Oz founders Felix Dennis and Richard Neville. By 1972, conflict about what Ink should be led to its failure, and Victor returned to the United States to work for Knopf.

=== Literary agent ===
Victor married his second wife, American lawyer Carol Ryan, and, after a year travelling, made their main home in London to be close to Victor's children. Victor was one of the first former journalist/editors to make the move to be a publishing agent, when in the 1970s literary agents were not welcomed by British publishers. However, many changed their minds when Victor's first sale in 1976 was for the book and film rights to Stephen Shephard's novel The Four Hundred for $1.5 million. In 2005, Victor's client John Banville won the Booker Prize. The following day Victor sold Eric Clapton's memoirs for $4 million.

Rather than take "blind" scripts sent to him, Victor instead began to gain clients through personal reference. He is recalled as being "the first agent to increase his commission from 10% to 15%. Few of his clients complained and over the years other agents quietly followed him....He negotiated deals for his authors that few could match." In 2003, Victor and his wife were named second on Tatler's list of the most invited guests in London, behind Elton John.

In the 2016 New Year Honours he was appointed Commander of the Order of the British Empire (CBE) for his services to literature. In September 2016, it was reported that David Cameron had signed with Victor to write his memoirs.

He celebrated the 40th anniversary of his literary agency, Ed Victor Ltd, in November 2016.

== Personal life ==
With his second wife, Carol Ryan, Victor lived mainly in London, with a secondary home in the Hamptons on Long Island, in the United States. The couple had a son, Ryan, while Victor had sons, Adam and Ivan, from his first marriage to Michelene Wandor. In 2002, Victor suffered an attack of viral pneumonia, but fully recovered.

The same year, Victor published his first book, The Obvious Diet – Your Personal Way to Lose Weight Fast Without Changing Your Lifestyle, through Ebury Press and Arcade Publishing.

Victor was vice chairman of the board of directors of the Almeida Theatre, a Trustee of the Arts Foundation and of the Hay Festival, as well as a founding director of the Groucho Club.

== Death ==
On 7 June 2017, while suffering from chronic lymphocytic leukemia, Victor died from a heart attack.

== Selected clients ==
From official website

- Douglas Adams (Estate)
- John Banville
- Johanna Basford
- Candice Bergen
- Carl Bernstein
- Max Brooks
- Mel Brooks
- Tina Brown
- Alastair Campbell
- Raymond Chandler (Estate)
- Eric Clapton
- Sophie Dahl
- Joe Eszterhas
- Sir Harold Evans
- Rupert Everett
- Sir Ranulph Fiennes
- Frederick Forsyth
- James Fox
- Mark Frost
- A. A. Gill
- Charles Glass
- Julian Glover
- Annabel Goldsmith
- Geordie Greig
- Josephine Hart (Estate)
- Jack Higgins
- Will Hutton
- Dylan Jones
- Nigella Lawson
- Kathy Lette
- Natascha McElhone
- Andrew Marr
- Iris Murdoch (Estate)
- Richard Neville
- Edna O'Brien
- Ben Okri
- Roman Polanski
- Frederic Raphael
- Keith Richards
- Ruth Rogers
- Lisa St Aubin de Terán
- Gerald Scarfe
- Sir Stephen Spender (Estate)
- Pamela Stephenson
- Peter Stothard
- Pete Townshend
- Irving Wallace (Estate)
- Tim Waterstone
- Lord Lloyd Webber
- U2
