= Charles M. Anderson =

Charles Martin Anderson CVO (1 July 1918 – 31 July 1961) was a British civil servant and diplomat who was active in the United Nations and UNICEF.

The only son of T. J. Anderson, he was educated at Gresham's School and Trinity Hall, Cambridge. In 1939, he joined the Consular Service and in October was appointed as probationer Vice-Consul at Bangkok. From 1943 to 1945 he was Vice-Consul at Antananarivo, Madagascar, then was posted to the Foreign Office, where he was a Foreign Office Resident Clerk. From 1947 to 1948 he was Private Secretary to the Chancellor of the Duchy of Lancaster, Lord Pakenham. In 1949, he was posted again to Bangkok as First Secretary, then in 1951 joined the United Kingdom Delegation to the United Nations, serving as the British member of the United Nations Children's Emergency Fund. In December 1953, he was appointed as British Consul in Luxembourg, and in December 1958 to the British High Commission in New Delhi.

In March 1961, Anderson was appointed a Commander of the Royal Victorian Order.

In 1948 Anderson married Beryl June Kimber, and they had two daughters.
