= The Showgrounds, Sligo =

Football stadium in Sligo, Ireland

The Showgrounds
- An Páirc Thaispeántais
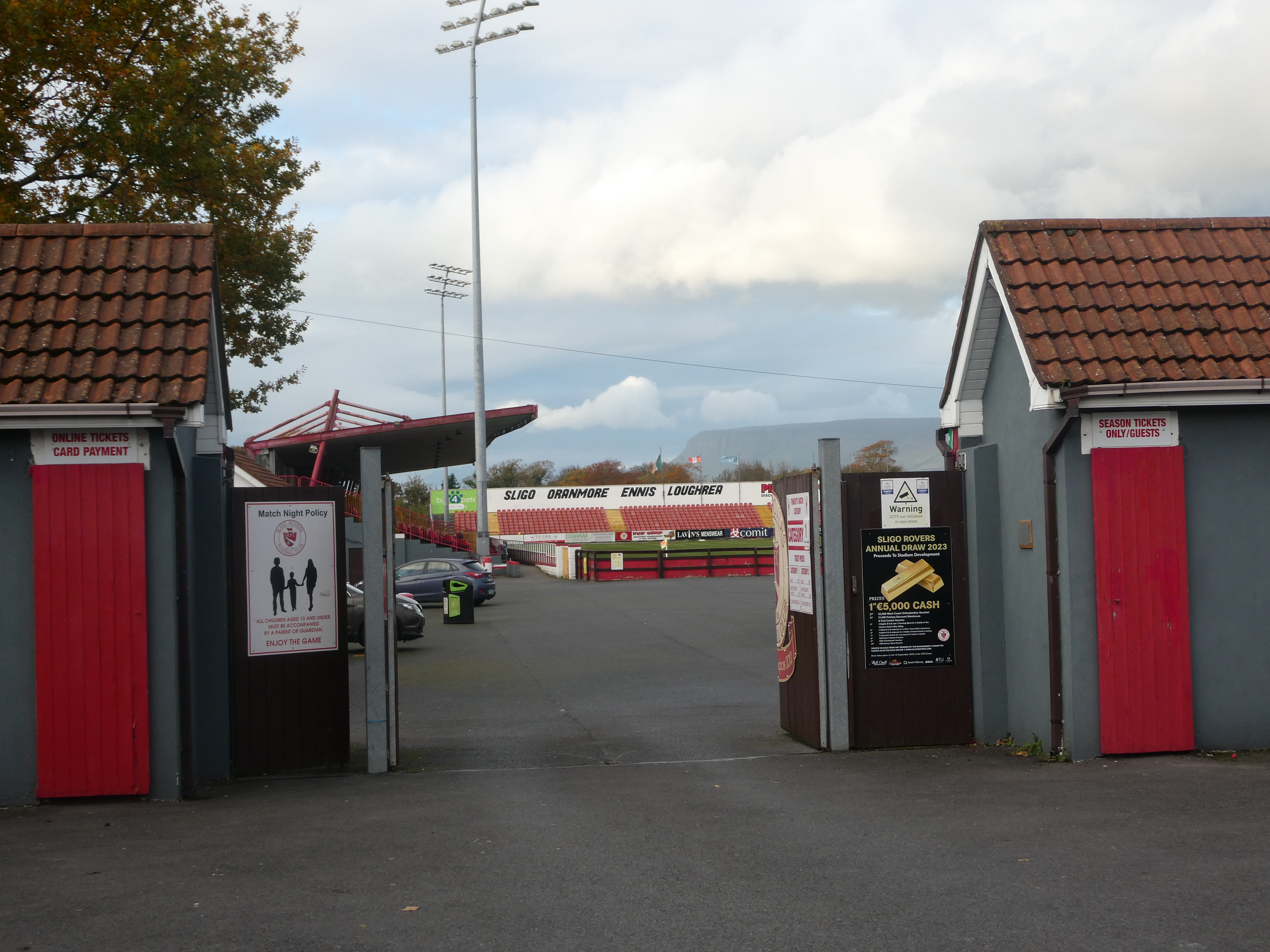
- Interactive map of The Showgrounds
- Full name: The Showgrounds, Sligo Town
- Location: Sligo, County Sligo
- Coordinates: 54°16′12″N 8°29′14″W
- Owner: The people of Sligo
- Capacity: 4,200 (3,873 seated)
- Surface: Grass
- Scoreboard: Yes
- Record attendance: 13,908
- Public transit: Sligo Mac Diarmada railway station

Construction
- Built: 1907–08
- Opened: 1908
- Renovated: 2012

Tenant
- Sligo Rovers F.C. (1928–present)

The Showgrounds is a stadium in Sligo, Ireland, which has been home of Sligo Rovers since the club was formed in 1928.

== History ==
The Showgrounds were established by the County Sligo Agricultural Society in 1907 for the organisation's agricultural show. Historical maps as far back as 1888 identify a site in the area called the Agricultural Show Ground. The show's committee included a provision that the grounds were to be used "to make temporary or permanent lettings to cricket, football, hockey, cycling and other societies and clubs, and to give facilities for the playing of these or other games". The gates of the venue first opened on the 22 July 1908 for the County Sligo Agricultural Show, with a one shilling fee "to field and general enclosure" and 2s 6d for entry to "field and grandstand". Originally known as the New Show Grounds, the Sligo Independent reported that the site had been enclosed for a cost approaching £1,000. The first sporting fixture held at the ground was for Gaelic games; a county final between the minor teams of Coolera and Keash on 9 August 1908.

The first soccer game played at the Showgrounds took place between Sligo St. Mary's and Ballina A.F.C. on 1 May 1909. Sligo St. Mary's won the match 5–0. The ground was leased until 1968 when it was then purchased for Sligo Rovers by a trust foundation representing the people of Sligo. Under the terms of the purchase it can never be mortgaged, sold or used for any commercial purposes other than sport and leisure. The Showgrounds is a 12 acre (49,000 m²) site with the stadium capacity of 3,873 seats.

On 8 November 1978 Sligo opened their new covered accommodation on the Jinks Avenue in a FAI League Cup semi final against Shamrock Rovers.

In November 2001 the new main stand was opened to the public for the League Cup fixture with St. Patrick's Athletic. The stand accommodates 1,853 seats, although there is available capacity for further seating. It has been built in cantilever style to ensure there is no obstructed view.

The Showgrounds was revamped in winter 2006 with the demolition of the ground's most famous "Shed". This was followed by the demolition of the ground's old famous turnstiles. New state of the art turnstiles were built along with front offices. In March 2009 work was finished on a new club shop which is open on match nights. This is situated on the Tracey Avenue Stand side.

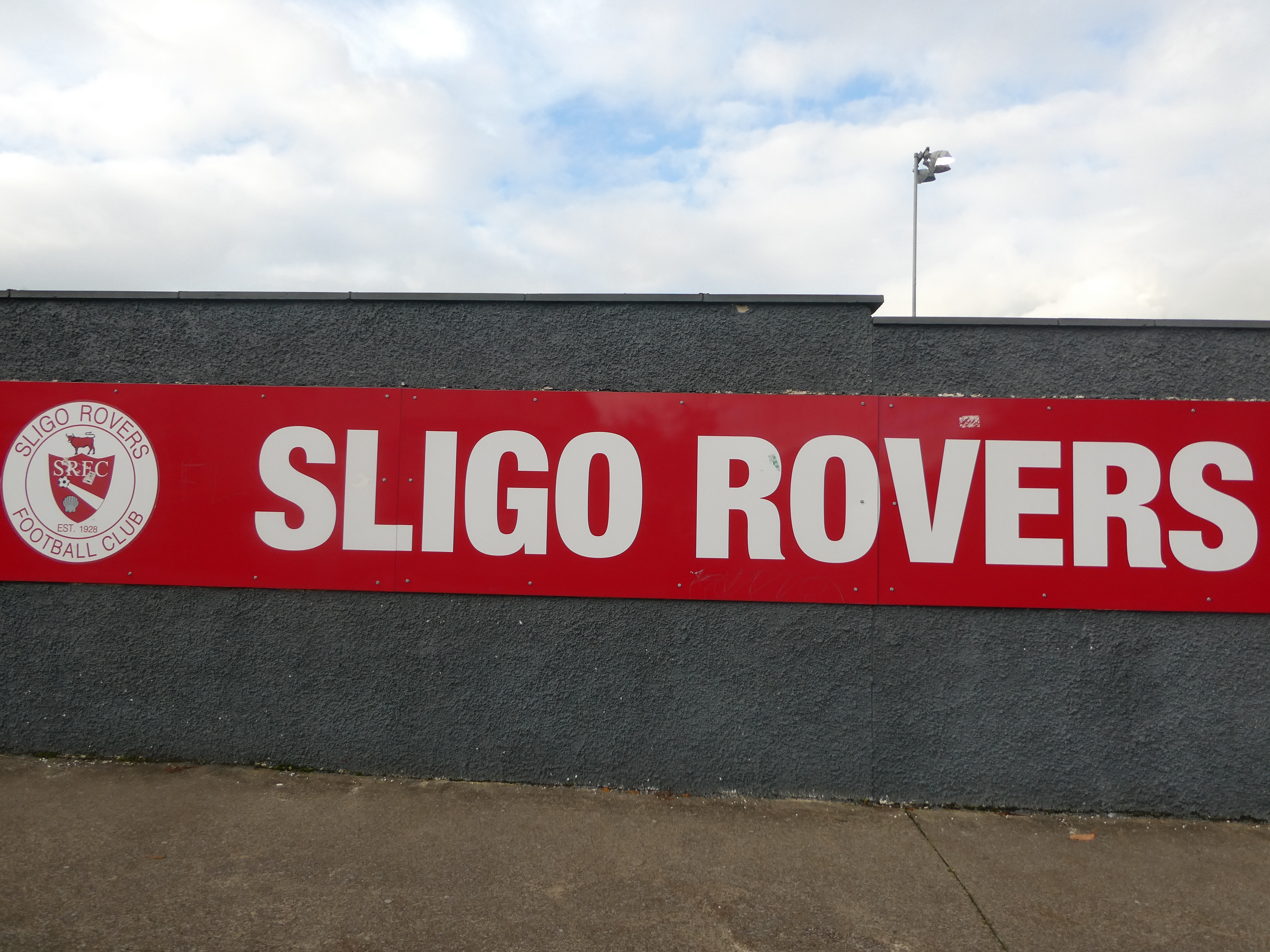
Sign at the Showgrounds

In May 2009 the Showgrounds had some major upgrading work done to enable the club to compete in the 2009-10 UEFA Europa League. This work included the building of a new fully tarred car park, along with upgrading work to both all seater stands. An extra 200 seats were added to the Red Stand and also new seating was put into the jinks side of the ground. This work brought the seating capacity of the ground up to 2,700 which was required for competing in the Europa League.

In July 2012 a new uncovered stand — originally called the Volkswagen Bank End and later known as the Pet Stop Stand — was completed at the Railway End, consisting of 1,323 seats. In the 2016 domestic league season, Sligo Rovers drew an average home attendance of 2,087, the fourth-highest in the league.

== Proposed development ==
Plans have previously been proposed to demolish the Jinks Avenue Stand and build a new 2,000 seater stand in its place. There have also been plans to add a roof to the new Railway End and replace the old shed end with a new stand, although the roof has since been scrapped due to insufficient funds.

In May 2021, Sligo Rovers unveiled a €17 million plan to redevelop Showgrounds into a 6,000 capacity seater stadium, upgrading the facility to UEFA category 3. The redevelopment plan included a provisional agreement, which would see Connacht Rugby also use the ground for competitions.

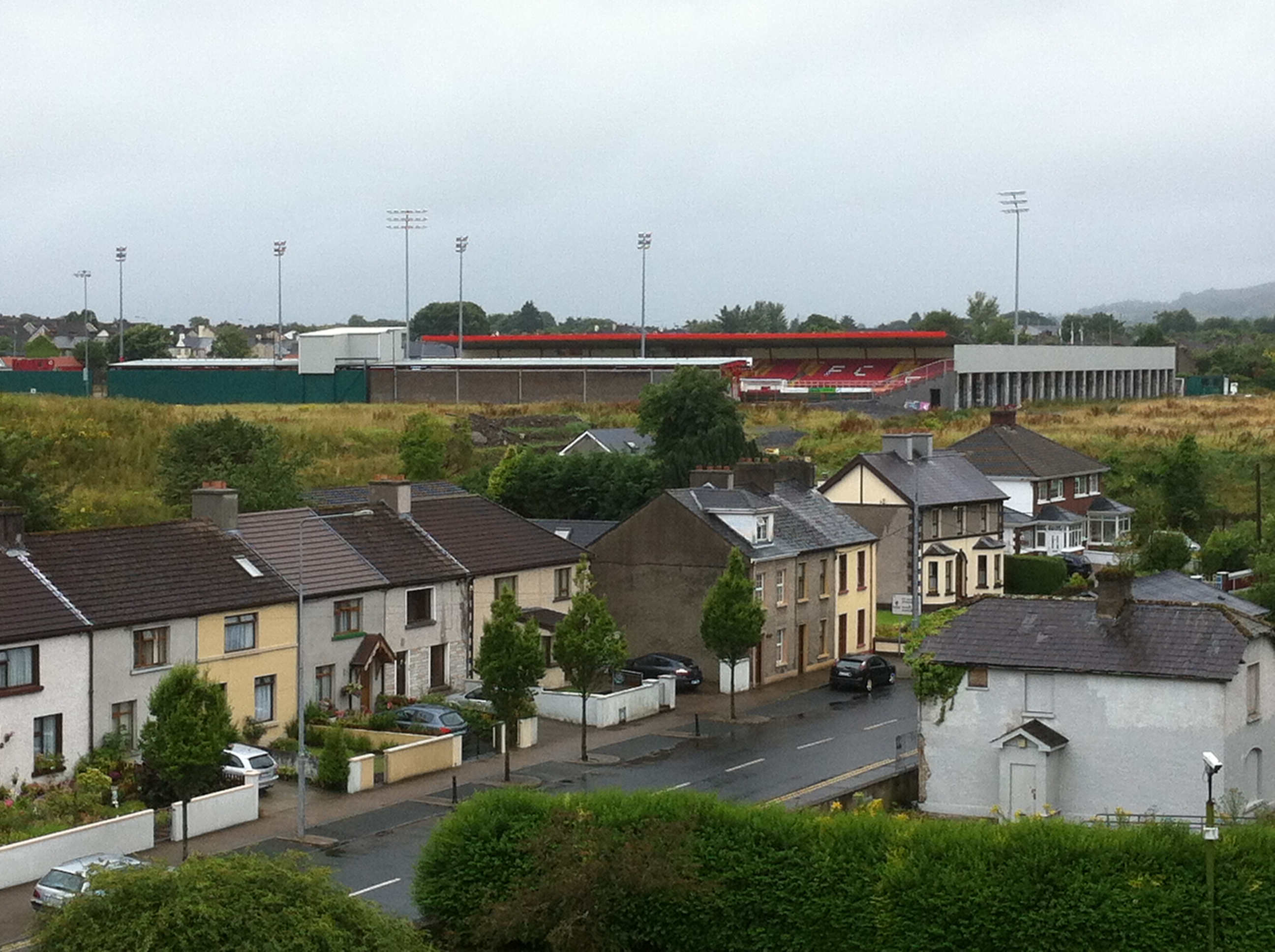
External view of The Showgrounds

In 2024, the Irish government announced that over €16M had been allocated for the proposed redevelopment plans.

== Capacity ==
The record attendance at the ground, of 13,908, was recorded in an FAI Cup semi-final replay between Sligo Rovers and Cobh Ramblers on 17 April 1983.

Stand	Capacity (seats)	Proposed capacity (seats)
Tracey Avenue Stand	1,687	1,550
Railway End – (Pet Stop Stand)	1,323	1,150
Jinks Avenue Stand	867	1,980
Churchill Road Stand	–	1,320
Total seating capacity	3,873	6,000

As of 18 May 2021, the stadium's car park has 115 spaces.

== Other uses ==
The Showgrounds hosted greyhound racing from c.1934 - c.1947, which was initially run by the Sligo Greyhound Racing Company. In 1939, the Sligo greyhound business was purchased by Matthew J. Lyons and John E. Dorris, who then moved the entire operation to Longford Greyhound Stadium.

The North-Western Greyhound Association applied for a licence in September 1945 which was granted by the Irish Coursing Club to James Costello. The racing seems to have ended during 1947.

The Showground hosted the match between champions, Rockmount A.F.C., and Cockhill Celtic in the 2023 FAI Intermediate Cup Final.
