= Prisoners Abroad =

British human rights charity

- Prisoners Abroad logo
- Formation: 1978; 48 years ago
- Founder: Craig Feehan, Joe Parham, Chris Cheal and Bob Nightingale
- Founded at: U.K.
- Registration no.: 1093710
- Budget: £1.6 million
- Website: www.prisonersabroad.org.uk

Prisoners Abroad is a UK-registered human rights and welfare charity which supports British citizens who are imprisoned overseas. It also works with ex-prisoners returning to the UK and family members and friends of those detained.

The organisation provides humanitarian aid, advice and emotional support to people affected by overseas imprisonment. They assist British citizens during their incarceration, when they return to the UK and need access to resettlement services, and they support their family and friends throughout the trauma.

Prisoners Abroad translates human rights law into practical life-saving actions by providing access to vitamins and essential food, emergency medical care, freepost envelopes to keep in touch with home and books and magazines to help sustain mental health.

== History ==
Prisoners Abroad was formed in 1978 by Craig Feehan, Joe Parham, Chris Cheal and Bob Nightingale. Initially it worked with Britons held mainly in Turkey, central Asia and north Africa. Each year supporting over 1,600 Britons imprisoned across the world in around 90 countries.

In UK terms, Prisoners Abroad is a small to medium-sized charity, with an annual turnover of £1.5 million.

== Welfare grants ==
The Craig Feehan Fund, which was founded after Craig Feehan's death in 1985, provides those imprisoned in particularly poor conditions with a monthly sum of money for essentials such as bedding, food, clothing, toiletries, vitamins, newspapers and correspondence. The fund provides help to those who are destitute and have no other source of income.

A vitamin fund is available to people imprisoned in countries where the nutrition is deemed inadequate for survival.

Medical grants are awarded on a case by case basis for treatment of medical issues ranging from blood pressure medication to eyeglasses to major surgeries. The funds also address diseases commonly found in foreign prisons, such as tuberculosis and HIV/AIDS.

Prisoners Abroad is a non-judgmental organisation and provides assistance on the basis of need and regardless of innocence or guilt.

== Support for families ==
Each year Prisoners Abroad provides assistance to more than 1,500 family members. This includes one-to-one support via a helpline, a private online network for family members, as well as hosting family support groups around the country and arranging overseas visits.

== Resettlement ==
Prisoners Abroad's work also extends to a resettlement service that supports those who return to the UK; they find them somewhere to stay, provide grants for food and travel, and help them take the vital steps to a new life. Each year they support around 300 people on return to the UK.

== Awards and patrons ==
In 2007 Prisoners Abroad was awarded the Longford Prize, awarded annually by the Longford Trust to "recognise the contribution of an individual, group or organisation working in the area of penal or social reform who/which has shown outstanding qualities of humanity, courage, persistence and originality".

In 2008 Prisoners Abroad were shortlisted for the Justice Awards and the Andy Ludlow London Homelessness Awards.

In 2010 Prisoners Abroad won the Guardian Public Service Awards, Carers, Families and Communities.

In 2012 Prisoners Abroad were shortlisted for the Charity Times' Charity of the Year (£1m - £10m) and Charity Principal of the Year.

In 2017 Prisoners Abroad's Resettlement Service was awarded second prize in the London Homelessness Awards.

Prominent patrons include the Archbishop of Westminster, Cardinal Vincent Nichols; Sir Ephraim Mirvis; the Right Reverend Rachel Treweek; Sir David Wootton; Jon Snow; Dominic Grieve QC; Kit de Waal; and Dame Harriet Walter. Dame Harriet read the BBC Radio 4 Appeal for Prisoners Abroad in July 2023.
