= Thomas Pakenham (historian) =

Anglo-Irish historian and arborist (born 1933)

The Right Honourable The Earl of Longford FRSL
- Tenure: 3 August 2001 – present
- Predecessor: Frank Longford
- Born: Thomas Francis Dermot Pakenham; 14 August 1933 (age 93)
- Spouse: Valerie Susan Scott (after 1964)
- Issue: 4
- Parents: The 7th Earl of Longford; Elizabeth Harman

Thomas Francis Dermot Pakenham, 8th Earl of Longford FRSL (born 14 August 1933), known simply as Thomas Pakenham, is an Anglo-Irish hereditary peer, historian and arborist who has written several prize-winning books on the diverse subjects of African history, Victorian and post-Victorian British history and trees.

== Early life and education ==
Pakenham is the eldest son of Frank Pakenham, 7th Earl of Longford, a Labour government minister, and the author Elizabeth Longford. He has seven siblings, among them the award-winning historian and biographer Lady Antonia Fraser (who is the widow of playwright Harold Pinter); Lady Rachel Billington, also a writer (and the widow of the director Kevin Billington); Lady Judith Kazantzis, a poet; and The Hon. Kevin Pakenham, who worked in the City of London. He is also a cousin of the former Labour deputy leader Harriet Harman.

Pakenham was educated at Belvedere College, a private Jesuit school in Dublin, and at Magdalen College, Oxford. After graduating in 1955, he travelled around Ethiopia, a journey that he described in his first book, The Mountains of Rasselas (1959).

== Later life ==
After returning to Britain, Pakenham worked on the editorial staff of the Times Educational Supplement and later for The Sunday Telegraph and The Observer. He now divides his time between London and County Westmeath, Ireland, where he is the Chairman of the Irish Tree Society and honorary custodian of Tullynally Castle.

Pakenham owned Longford Greyhound Stadium until 1966, when he sold it to Longford Sports Ltd.

Pakenham does not use the title Earl of Longford and, before succeeding his father in 2001, did not use the courtesy title Lord Silchester. However, he has not disclaimed his British titles of Baron Silchester and Baron Pakenham under the Peerage Act 1963 and his Irish earldom cannot be disclaimed as it is not covered by the Act. Following the House of Lords Act 1999, Pakenham is not entitled as a hereditary peer to a seat in the House of Lords. His father had previously been created a life peer in addition to his hereditary titles in order to retain his seat.

He was elected a Fellow of the Royal Society of Literature in 2016.

== Marriage and children ==
In 1964, Pakenham married Valerie Susan McNair Scott. They have four children.

- Lady Anna Maria Pakenham (born 26 July 1965)
- Lady Eliza Pakenham (born 3 November 1966)
- Edward Melchior Pakenham, Lord Silchester (born 6 January 1970), heir apparent to the earldom.
- Hon Frederick Augustus Pakenham (born 27 November 1971)

Valerie Pakenham died on 22 January 2023 at the age of 83.

== Bibliography ==
- The Mountains of Rasselas: An Ethiopian Adventure, Weidenfeld & Nicolson, 1959. (reprinted with updated photographs, 1998).
- The Year of Liberty: The History of the Great Irish Rebellion of 1798, Hodder & Stoughton, 1969.
- The Boer War, Weidenfeld & Nicolson, 1979.
- The Scramble for Africa, 1876-1912, Weidenfeld & Nicolson, 1991. (winner of WH Smith Literary Award and Alan Paton Award).
- Meetings with Remarkable Trees, Weidenfeld & Nicolson, 1996. (made into a radio series and TV series under the same title).
- Remarkable Trees of the World, Weidenfeld & Nicolson, 2002.
- The Remarkable Baobab, Weidenfeld & Nicolson, 2004.
- The Company of Trees: A Year in a Lifetime's Quest, Weidenfeld & Nicolson, 2015.
- The Tree Hunters: How the Cult of the Arboretum Transformed our Landscape, Weidenfeld & Nicolson, 2024.

Peerage of Ireland
Preceded by Frank Pakenham	Earl of Longford; 2001–	Incumbent; Heir: Edward Pakenham, Lord Silchester
