= The Scramble for Africa (book) =

1991 book by Thomas Pakenham

The Scramble for Africa: The White Man's Conquest of the Dark Continent from 1876 to 1912
- First US edition
- Author: Thomas Pakenham
- Language: English
- Subject: European colonisation of African territory between 1876 and 1912
- Genre: Nonfiction
- Publisher: UK Weidenfeld & Nicolson; USA Random House
- Publication date: 1991
- Publication place: United Kingdom
- Media type: Print
- Pages: 738
- ISBN: 0-349-10449-2

The Scramble for Africa, 1876–1912 or The Scramble for Africa: The White Man's Conquest of the Dark Continent from 1876 to 1912, is a comprehensive history of the colonisation of African territory by European powers between 1876 and 1912 known as the Scramble for Africa. The book was written by historian and arborist Thomas Pakenham and published in 1991, by Weidenfeld & Nicolson in the United Kingdom and Random House in the United States.

The book juxtaposes the motives of missionary David Livingstone, King Leopold II, and other leading figures in the southern African land-grab of the late 19th and early 20th century. Pakenham details the famous battles and short wars, such as the battles of Rorke's Drift and Isandlwana of the Anglo-Zulu war. The author explores how the different powerful figures dealt with the conflict and its ultimate consequences on the region.

In 1992, the book won the WH Smith Literary Award and the Alan Paton Award.

In a 1993 book review for The Journal of African History, historian Tony Hopkins wrote, "Pakenham has written a book that contributes nothing of significance to our understanding of the scramble. More damagingly, the work perpetuates and popularizes an outdated view of both African and imperial history." According to Hopkins, Pakenham's work is largely based on primary source documents written by the "blunderers and plunderers" themselves without critical analysis of the accuracy, biases, or self-serving motives of his sources. Hopkins also criticised Pakenham's use of artistic license to make inferences and embellish events without supporting evidence.
