= Acacia nana =

Small red-leaved wattle

Scientific classification
- Kingdom: Plantae
- Clade: Tracheophytes
- Clade: Angiosperms
- Clade: Eudicots
- Clade: Rosids
- Order: Fabales
- Family: Fabaceae
- Subfamily: Caesalpinioideae
- Clade: Mimosoid clade
- Genus: Acacia
- Species: A. nana

Binomial name
- Acacia nana J.B.Williams
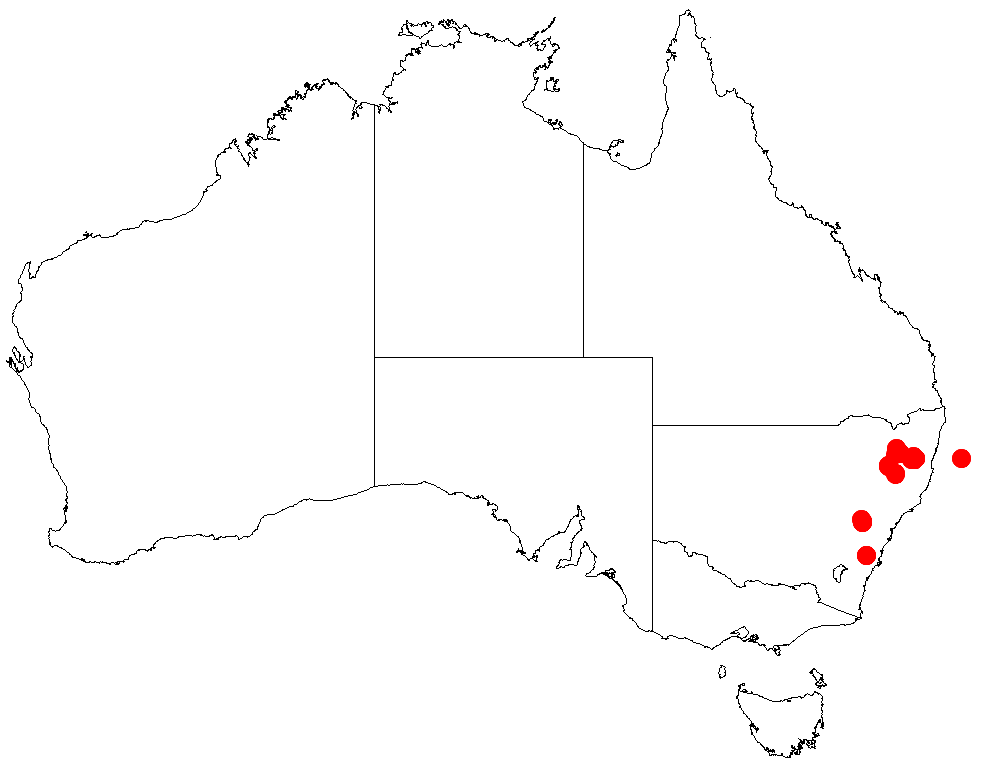
- Occurrence data from AVH

Species of legume

Acacia nana, also known as the small red-leaved wattle, is a shrub belonging to the genus Acacia and the subgenus Phyllodineae where it is endemic to eastern Australia.

== Description ==
The shrub typically grows to a height of 0.2 to 2 m (7.9 in to 6 ft 6.7 in) and has reddish to brown branchlets that are usually hairy. Like most species of Acacia it has phyllodes rather than true leaves. The evergreen phyllodes have a straight narrowly elliptic to oblanceolate shaped phyllodes with an excentric mucro. The glabrous to sub-glabrous phyllodes are 3 to 8 cm (1.2 to 3.1 in) in length and 7 to 6 mm (0.28 to 0.24 in) wide with a single nerve per face and age to a red colour. It has racemose inflorescences with spherical flower-heads that contain 7 to 12 golden coloured flowers. Following flowering it produces chartaceous and glabrous seed pods that have a narrowly oblong to linear shape with a length of around 4 cm (1.6 in) and a width of 4 to 6 mm (0.16 to 0.24 in). The dark brown seeds inside have an elliptic shape and a length of about 4 mm (0.16 in).

== Distribution ==
It is native to a disjunct area in the northern and central tablelands of New South Wales. The northernmost populations are found around Longford and Ebor and the southern populations are in the western Blue Mountains around Capetree and Cullen Bullen.

== See also ==
- List of Acacia species
