= Rachel Billington =

British novelist, children's writer, and scriptwriter

Lady Rachel Billington OBE
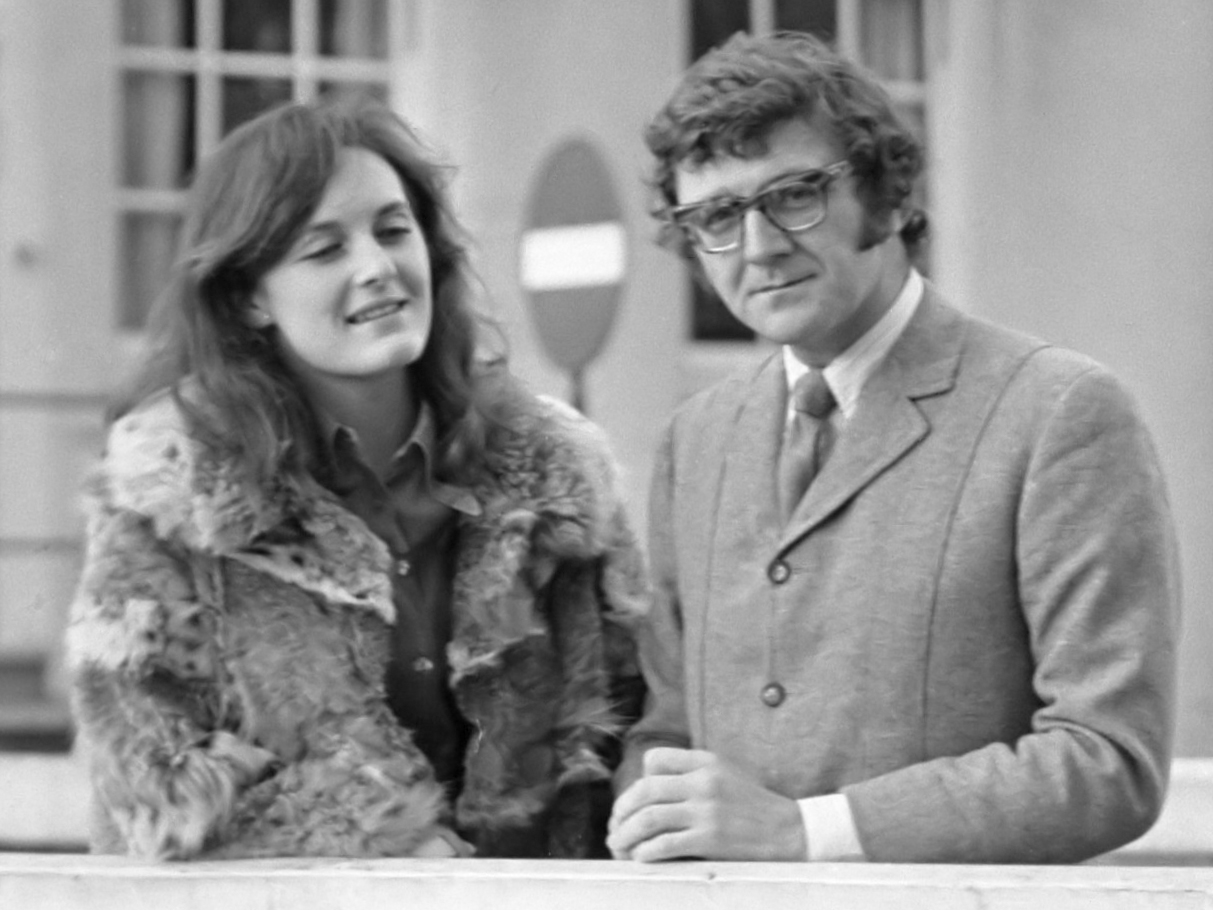
- Billington and her husband Kevin in 1968
- Born: Rachel Mary Pakenham; 11 May 1942 (age 83); Oxford, England
- Occupations: Author, novelist
- Spouse: Kevin Billington (m. 1967; died 2021)
- Children: 4
- Parent(s): Frank Pakenham, 7th Earl of Longford; Elizabeth Harman
- Relatives: Christine Longford (aunt); Judith Kazantzis (sister); Lady Antonia Fraser (sister); Thomas Pakenham (brother); Harriet Harman (cousin)
- Website: www.rachelbillington.com

Lady Rachel Mary Billington OBE (née Pakenham; born 11 May 1942) is a British author, the third daughter of the 7th Earl and Countess of Longford; both parents were writers, as was her aunt, Christine Longford.

== Career ==
Billington worked in television in London and New York before taking up full-time writing in 1968. She has published twenty-one novels for adults, including the bestsellers A Woman's Age and Bodily Harm. Her novel Glory (2015) describes the First World War Gallipoli campaign through the eyes of the participants and their wives and girlfriends at home. She has also written six children's novels, six religious books for children and three non-fiction books, including The Great Umbilical, about mothers and daughters.

She has written plays for BBC Television's Play for Today series (Don't Be Silly and Life After Death), and several radio plays, and has contributed to film scripts including The Light at the Edge of the World (1971). Billington has also written and continues to write journalism for newspapers in both the UK and the US, including a three-year stint as columnist for The Sunday Telegraph.

== Volunteer work ==
Billington was President of English PEN, the writers' organisation, from 1998 to 2001 and is now Honorary Vice-President. During her period as President, she initiated PEN's Readers & Writers programme, which sends books and writers to meet readers in schools, prisons and other institutions which lack resources.

She is a trustee of the Longford Trust, which was founded in memory of her father, Lord Longford. In 1991, she became a member of the editorial team of Inside Time, the not-for-profit national newspaper for prisoners. She now writes a monthly column. In addition she is a trustee of the Catholic weekly, The Tablet, and of the Siobhan Dowd Trust, set up to encourage reading among disadvantaged children.

== Awards ==
Billington was appointed Officer of the Order of the British Empire (OBE) in the 2012 New Year Honours for her services to literature.

== Personal life ==
Billington was married to the film, theatre and television director Kevin Billington. They had four children and five grandchildren. She is the godmother of Boris Johnson. Her cousin is former Labour Deputy Leader Harriet Harman.

In the 2006 television film Longford, a biopic of Billington's father and his campaign for the parole of Myra Hindley, Billington was portrayed by actress Kate Miles.

== Books ==
Novels

- Glory
- Maria and the Admiral
- The Missing Boy
- Lies and Loyalties
- One Summer
- The Space Between
- A Woman's Life
- Tiger Sky
- Perfect Happiness
- Magic and Fate
- Bodily Harm
- Theo and Matilda
- Loving Attitudes
- The Garish Day
- Occasion of Sin
- A Woman's Age
- A Painted Devil
- Beautiful
- Cock Robin
- Lilacs Out of the Dead Land
- The Big Dipper
- All Things Nice

Religious books

- The First Christmas
- The First Easter
- The First Miracles
- The Life of Jesus
- The Life of Saint Francis
- Chapters of Gold

Non-fiction

- The Great Umbilical
- The Family Year

Children's books

- Poppy's Angel
- Poppy's Hero
- There's More to Life
- Far Out!
- Star Time
- Rosanna and the Wizard-Robot
- There's more to life
