= Longford Lecture =

London lectures on prison reform

The Longford Lectures are held annually in November in the circular Assembly Hall of Church House, Westminster, London. They aim to provide a national platform for a serious contribution to questions of social and penal reform.

The Lectures are organised by The Longford Trust which celebrates the achievements and continues the work of Lord Longford. It was established in 2002 by friends and admirers to further the goals he pursued, particularly in the field of social and prison reform.

The Longford Lectures were sponsored originally by The Independent and more recently by the Daily Telegraph.

In addition to the Lectures, the Trust awards The Longford Prize to individuals and organisations who play a prominent role in the field of prison reform.

The broadcaster and journalist Jon Snow chairs the event.

== Past Lectures ==
Full transcripts of all lectures and films of recent lectures available on the Longford Trust website.

Year	Speaker	Title of the Lecture	Chaired by
2002	Cherie Booth QC	The Law, the Victims and the Vulnerable	Jon Snow
2003	John Sentamu	Towards a Global Paradigm of Justice	Jon Snow
2004	Desmond Tutu	Restorative Justice	Jon Snow
2005	Brenda Hale	Women in the Criminal Justice System	Jon Snow
2006	Clive Stafford Smith	Lessons politicians learn from America	Jon Snow
2007	Mary McAleese	Changing History	Jon Snow
2008	Special Debate	We Cannot Build Our Way Out of the Prisons' Crisis	Jon Snow
2009	Sir Hugh Orde	War is easy. Peace is the difficult prize	Rachel Billington
2010	Martha Lane Fox	Views from a dot.com dinosaur	Jon Snow
2011	Jon Snow	Crime, Punishment and the Media	Shami Chakrabarti
2012	Will Self	Drug use in British Prisons	Rachel Billington
2013	Bianca Jagger	Ending violence against women and girls	Jon Snow
2014	Nils Öberg	Cracking the Code: how Sweden is closing prisons and reducing the prison population	Jon Snow
2015	Michael Palin	Collateral damage: The effects of prison sentences on offenders' families	Jon Snow
2016	Michael Gove	What is Really Criminal About Our Justice System	Jon Snow
2017	Ken Loach	Charity or Justice?	Jon Snow
2018	Longford Scholars	Why People Stop Doing Crime	Jon Snow
2019	Lord Blair	Where Next For Policing and Criminal Justice	Jon Snow

== See also ==
- The Longford Prize
- Lord Longford
- The Longford Trust
