= Elizabeth Longford =

English historian (1906–2002)

The Right Honourable The Countess of Longford CBE
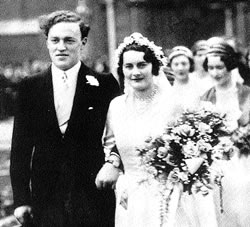
- Elizabeth Pakenham at her wedding
- Born: Elizabeth Harman; 30 August 1906; Marylebone, London, England
- Died: 23 October 2002 (aged 96); Hurst Green, East Sussex, England
- Spouse: Frank Pakenham, 7th Earl of Longford (m. 1931; died 2001)
- Issue: 8, including Antonia, Thomas, Judith, Rachel, and Michael

Elizabeth Pakenham, Countess of Longford (née Harman; 30 August 1906 – 23 October 2002), better known as Elizabeth Longford, was an English historian. She was a member of the Royal Society of Literature and was on the board of trustees of the National Portrait Gallery in London. She is best known as a historian, especially for her biographies of 19th-century figures including Queen Victoria (1964), Lord Byron (1976) and the Duke of Wellington (1969).

== Early life ==
Elizabeth Harman was born on 30 August 1906 at 108 Harley Street in Marylebone, London. The daughter of eye specialist Nathaniel Bishop Harman, she was educated at Francis Holland School and Headington School, and was an undergraduate at Lady Margaret Hall, Oxford. "Able, articulate and beautiful", in the words of The New York Times, she was "the Zuleika Dobson of her day, with undergraduates and even dons tumbling over one another to fall in love with her". A few years after her graduation, on 3 November 1931, she married Frank Pakenham, later 7th Earl of Longford, who died in August 2001. Her obituary by the BBC said the marriage was "famously harmonious". The New York Times, in its review of The Pebbled Shore, called Lady Longford "easily the best writer in what is predominantly a literary family".

She and her husband were both devout Roman Catholic converts, Lady Longford having been raised a Unitarian, and avid social reformers. The Longfords had eight children:

1. Lady Antonia Margaret Caroline Pakenham (27 August 1932)
2. Thomas Francis Dermot Pakenham, 8th Earl of Longford (14 August 1933)
3. The Honourable Patrick Maurice Pakenham (17 April 1937 – 8 June 2005)
4. Lady Judith Elizabeth Pakenham (14 August 1940 – 18 September 2018)
5. Lady Rachel Mary Pakenham (11 May 1942)
6. The Honourable Michael Aidan Pakenham (3 November 1943)
7. Lady Catherine Rose Pakenham (28 February 1946 – 11 August 1969)
8. The Honourable Kevin John Toussaint Pakenham (1 November 1947 – 19 July 2020)

Daughters Lady Antonia Fraser, Lady Rachel Billington, Judith Kazantzis are all writers, and Thomas Pakenham succeeded his father as Earl of Longford. Her brother, John B. Harman, was a physician; his daughter is Labour politician Harriet Harman. Lady Longford was a great-niece of the politician Joseph Chamberlain and a first cousin once removed of the British prime minister Neville Chamberlain.

== Political career ==
She made several unsuccessful attempts to win election to the House of Commons as a Labour MP. In 1935 she contested Cheltenham, which was a safely Conservative seat, and in 1950 she was defeated by Quintin Hogg at Oxford. Through the war she had sought selection at Birmingham King's Norton until she felt compelled to cease her candidacy upon her sixth pregnancy in 1944; the seat was a Labour gain in 1945 by 12,000 votes.

== Death ==
Longford died on 23 October 2002, aged 96, at Bernhurst in Hurst Green, East Sussex.

== Publications ==
- Victoria R.I. (1964) Awarded the James Tait Black Memorial Prize
- Wellington: The Years of the Sword (1969) and Wellington: Pillar Of State (1972), a two-volume biography of the first Duke of Wellington, who numbered among her husband's relatives
- The Royal House of Windsor (1974)
- Winston Churchill (1974)
- Byron's Greece. New York: Harper and Row. 1975. ISBN 978-0-06-012673-5. OCLC 1028866749.
- Byron (1976)
- A Pilgrimage of Passion: The Life of Wilfrid Scawen Blunt (1979) (I.B. Tauris, re-issued 2007)
- Eminent Victorian Women. London: Weidenfeld & Nicolson. 1981. ISBN 978-0-297-77985-8. OCLC 1033562084.
- Jameson's Raid (1982)
- Elizabeth R: A Biography (1983)
- The Pebbled Shore: The Memoirs of Elizabeth Longford. London: Weidenfeld & Nicolson. 1986. ISBN 978-0-297-78863-8. OCLC 1036768821.
- Royal Throne: The Future of the Monarchy. London: Hodder & Stoughton. 1993. ISBN 978-0-340-58587-0. OCLC 1036847832.
- Queen Victoria. Stroud, Gloucestershire: Sutton Publishing. 1999. ISBN 978-0-7509-2143-5. OCLC 1245768856.
