= Frank Pakenham, 7th Earl of Longford =

British politician and social reformer (1905–2001)

The Right Honourable The Earl of Longford KG PC
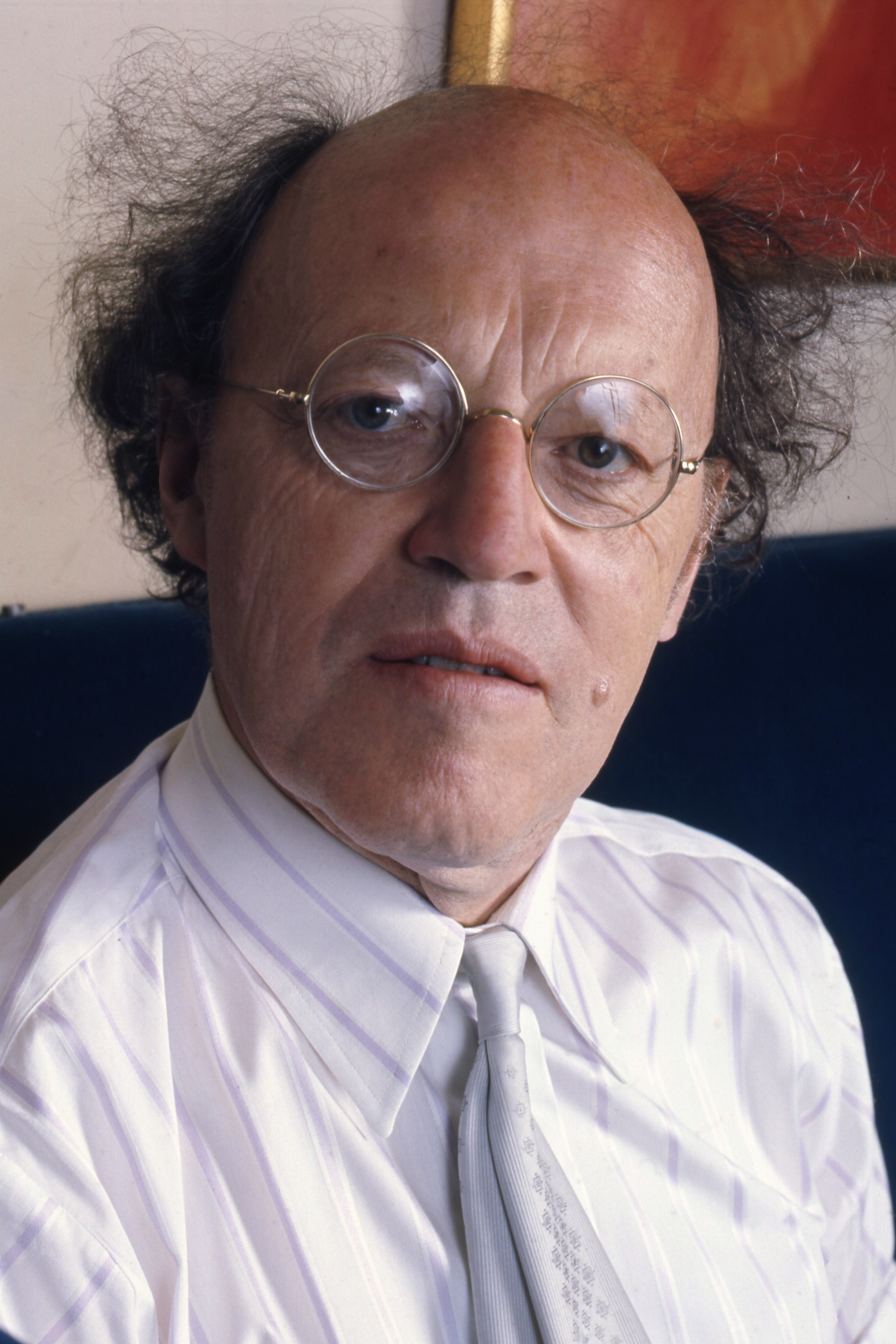
- Longford in 1974

Leader of the House of Lords
- In office 18 October 1964 – 16 January 1968
- Prime Minister: Harold Wilson
- Preceded by: The Lord Carrington
- Succeeded by: The Lord Shackleton

Lord Keeper of the Privy Seal
- In office 6 April 1966 – 16 January 1968
- Prime Minister: Harold Wilson
- Preceded by: Sir Frank Soskice
- Succeeded by: The Lord Shackleton
- In office 18 October 1964 – 23 December 1965
- Prime Minister: Harold Wilson
- Preceded by: Selwyn Lloyd
- Succeeded by: Sir Frank Soskice

Secretary of State for the Colonies
- In office 23 December 1965 – 6 April 1966
- Prime Minister: Harold Wilson
- Preceded by: Anthony Greenwood
- Succeeded by: Frederick Lee

First Lord of the Admiralty
- In office 24 May 1951 – 13 October 1951
- Prime Minister: Clement Attlee
- Preceded by: The Viscount Hall
- Succeeded by: James Thomas

Minister of Civil Aviation
- In office 31 May 1948 – 1 June 1951
- Prime Minister: Clement Attlee
- Preceded by: The Lord Nathan
- Succeeded by: The Lord Ogmore

Chancellor of the Duchy of Lancaster (Deputy Foreign Secretary)
- In office 17 April 1947 – 31 May 1948
- Prime Minister: Clement Attlee
- Preceded by: John Hynd
- Succeeded by: Hugh Dalton

Parliamentary Under-Secretary of State for War
- In office 4 October 1946 – 17 April 1947
- Prime Minister: Clement Attlee
- Preceded by: The Lord Nathan
- Succeeded by: John Freeman

Lord-in-waiting Government Whip
- In office 14 October 1945 – 4 October 1946
- Prime Minister: Clement Attlee
- Preceded by: The Lord Alness
- Succeeded by: The Lord Chorley

Member of the House of Lords
- Lord Temporal
- Hereditary peerage 12 October 1945 – 11 November 1999
- Preceded by: Peerage created
- Succeeded by: Seat abolished
- Life peerage 16 November 1999 – 3 August 2001

Personal details
- Born: Francis Aungier Pakenham; 5 December 1905 London, England
- Died: 3 August 2001 (aged 95) London, England
- Party: Labour
- Spouse: Elizabeth Harman (m. 1931)
- Children: 8, including Antonia, Thomas, Judith, Rachel, and Michael
- Parent(s): Thomas Pakenham, 5th Earl of Longford; Lady Mary Child-Villiers
- Education: New College, Oxford

Francis Aungier Pakenham, 7th Earl of Longford (5 December 1905 – 3 August 2001), known to his family as Frank Longford and styled Lord Pakenham from 1945 to 1961, was a British politician and social reformer. A member of the Labour Party, he was one of its longest-serving politicians. He held cabinet positions on several occasions between 1947 and 1968. Longford was politically active until his death in 2001. A member of an old, landed Anglo-Irish family, the Pakenhams (who became Earls of Longford), he was one of the few hereditary peers ever to serve in a senior capacity within a Labour government.

Longford was famed for championing social outcasts and unpopular causes. He is especially notable for his lifelong advocacy of penal reform. Longford visited prisons on a regular basis for nearly 70 years until his death. He advocated for rehabilitation programmes and helped create the modern British parole system in the 1960s following the abolition of the death penalty. His ultimately unsuccessful campaign for the release of Moors murderer Myra Hindley attracted much media and public controversy. For this work, the Longford Prize is named after him. It is awarded annually during the Longford Lecture and recognises achievement in the field of penal reform.

As a devout Christian determined to translate faith into action, he was known for his bombastic style and his eccentricity. Although a shrewd and influential politician, he was also widely unpopular among Labour leaders, particularly for his lack of ministerial ability, and was moved from cabinet post to cabinet post, never serving more than two years at any one ministry. Labour Prime Minister Harold Wilson opined that Longford had the mental capacity of a 12-year-old.

In 1972, he was made a Knight Companion of the Garter. In the same year, he was appointed to head the group charged with investigating the effects of pornography on society which published the controversial Pornography Report (the Longford Report). He became known as a campaigner against pornography and held the view that it was degrading to both its users and to those who worked in the trade, especially women. Longford was also an outspoken critic of the British press, and once said it was "trembling on the brink of obscenity".

Longford was instrumental in decriminalising homosexuality in the United Kingdom, but was always forthright with his strong moral disapproval of homosexual acts on religious grounds. He opposed furthering gay rights legislation, including the equalisation of the age of consent, and also supported the passage of Section 28.

== Background and education ==
Born in London to an Anglo-Irish aristocratic family, he was the second son of Thomas Pakenham, 5th Earl of Longford in the Peerage of Ireland. He was educated at Eton College and New College, Oxford, where as an undergraduate he was a member of the Bullingdon Club. He graduated with a first-class honours degree in Philosophy, Politics, and Economics and became a don at Christ Church. His move to the political left was sped by his determination to help prevent the spread of fascism in Oxford. In 1936 a visit to the city by Oswald Mosley and a group of his Blackshirts resulted in violence. According to an account by Hugh Trevor-Roper, 'Great damage to the Blackshirts was done by one of the dons of Christ Church [Pakenham], who, being struck over the head by a Blackshirt with a steel chain, was roused to a berserk fury.'

== Political career ==
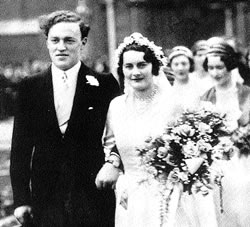
Pakenham at his wedding in 1931

After a disastrous spell in stockbroking with Buckmaster & Moore, in 1931 the 25-year-old Pakenham joined the Conservative Research Department where he developed education policy for the Conservative Party. His wife Elizabeth persuaded him to become a socialist. They were married on 3 November 1931 and had eight children. In 1940, only a few months after the onset of the Second World War, he suffered a nervous breakdown and was invalided out of the armed forces. The same year, having been raised as a member of the Church of Ireland, he became a Roman Catholic. His wife was initially dismayed by this, for she had been brought up a Unitarian and associated the Church of Rome with reactionary politics, but in 1946 she joined the same church. During the war, Pakenham was hired as an assistant for William Beveridge, and was involved in the production of the Beveridge Report and the 1944 book Full Employment in a Free Society.

Pakenham then embarked on a political career. In July 1945 he contested Oxford against the sitting Conservative member, Quintin Hogg, but was defeated by nearly 3,000 votes. In October of that year he was created Baron Pakenham, of Cowley in the City of Oxford, in the Peerage of the United Kingdom, by the Labour government of Clement Attlee, and took his seat in the House of Lords as one of the few Labour peers. He was immediately appointed a Lord-in-waiting by Attlee. In 1947, he was appointed deputy Foreign Secretary, outside the cabinet, with special responsibility for the British zone in occupied Germany, and Chancellor of the Duchy of Lancaster, with a diplomat, Charles M. Anderson, as his Private Secretary. He made headlines by telling German audiences that the British people forgave them for what had happened in the war; at his death, the Lord Bishop of Birmingham remarked that West German Chancellor Konrad Adenauer was supposed to have "counted him as one of the founders of the Federal Republic". In May 1948, he was moved to the lower-profile role of Minister of Civil Aviation and was sworn of the Privy Council in June of that year. He continued in this post until May 1951. From May until the fall of the administration in October 1951, he was First Lord of the Admiralty.

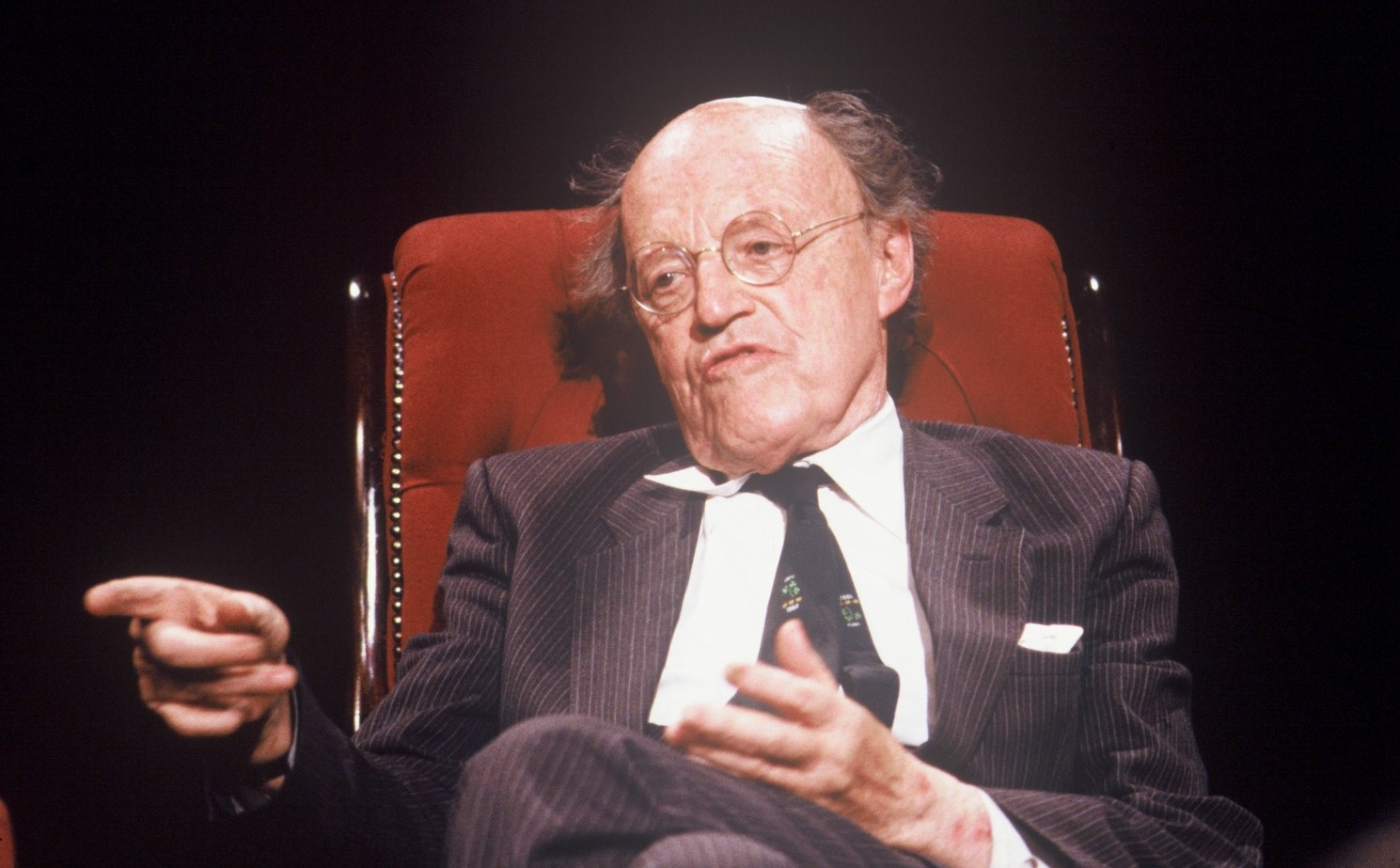
On television discussion series After Dark in 1988

In 1961, Pakenham inherited from his brother the earldom of Longford in the Peerage of Ireland and from then onward was generally known to the public as Lord Longford. When Labour returned to power in October 1964 under Harold Wilson, Longford was appointed Lord Privy Seal and Leader of the House of Lords, despite the fact that Wilson had little respect for him. In December 1965 he became Secretary of State for the Colonies, continuing as Leader of the House of Lords. After only four months at the Colonial Office, he was removed from the post for failing to master his brief, and again became Lord Privy Seal in April 1966. Wilson often talked about sacking Longford from his government, which is believed by some to have led to Longford's resignation as Lord Privy Seal and Leader of the House of Lords in January 1968 – though the actual occasion of his resignation was the failure of Education Secretary Patrick Gordon Walker to agree to the raising of the school-leaving age. In 1972 he was created a Knight Companion of the Garter.

== Penal reform ==
Longford began visiting prisoners in the 1930s when he was a city councillor in Oxford, and continued to do so every week, all around the country, until shortly before his death in 2001. Among the thousands he befriended and helped were a small number of individuals who had committed the most notorious crimes, including child murderer Myra Hindley.

In 1956, he set up New Bridge Foundation, an organisation that aimed to help prisoners stay in touch with society and integrate them back into it.

New Bridge set up Inside Time in 1990, the only national newspaper for the UK's prison population. As of 2014, novelist and journalist Rachel Billington, Longford's daughter, worked at the title one day a week. Longford organised many debates on prison reform in the House of Lords from the 1950s onward, and in 1963 chaired the commission whose report recommended reform in sentencing policy and the establishment of a parole system.

Longford was a leading figure in the Nationwide Festival of Light of 1971, protesting against the commercial exploitation of sex and violence, and advocating the teaching of Christ as the key to recovering moral stability in the nation. His anti-pornography campaigning made him the subject of derision and he was labelled by the press as Lord Porn when he and former prison doctor Christine Temple-Saville set out on a wide-ranging tour of sex industry establishments in the early 1970s to compile a self-funded report. The press made much of his visits to strip clubs in Copenhagen.

Peter Stanford wrote in The Guardian's obituary of Longford that in the late 1980s, the peer was contacted by the solicitor for a young Dutchman, convicted of a drugs offence, sent to Albany prison on the Isle of Wight, who was suffering from AIDS and had been cut off by his family. Longford was the only person to visit the dying man, a gesture repeated in countless episodes that never made headlines, but which brought succour and relief.

=== Myra Hindley ===
He gained a reputation for eccentricity, becoming known for his efforts to rehabilitate offenders and in particular campaigning for the parole and release from prison of the Moors murderer Myra Hindley, who had been jailed for life along with Ian Brady in 1966 for the Moors murders.

Longford's support for Hindley led to the soubriquet Lord Wrongford from the tabloid press, which largely opposed Hindley being released from prison. It also coincided with Longford's contact with Hindley becoming public knowledge in 1972, when "Lord Porn" was in the midst of the debacle of a much-lampooned anti-pornography crusade against "indecency", giving rise to more allegations of hypocrisy than had already resulted from his tours of sex clubs.

In 1977, 11 years after Hindley was convicted of two murders and being an accessory to a third murder, Longford appeared on television and spoke openly of his belief that Hindley should now be considered for parole as she had shown clear signs of progress in prison and now served long enough for the Parole Board to assess her suitability for parole. He also supported Hindley's claims that her role in the Moors Murders was merely that of an unwilling accessory, rather than an active participant, and that she had only taken part due to Brady's abuse and threats. These claims were aired in the inaugural episode of Brass Tacks, which featured arguments for and against Hindley being considered for parole. Ann West, the mother of Lesley Ann Downey, spoke out against the suggestion of Hindley ever being paroled, and openly told viewers that she would kill Hindley if she ever was released.

In 1985, he condemned the Parole Board's decision not to consider Hindley's release for another five years as "barbaric". His campaign for Hindley continued even after she admitted to two more murders in 1986, which further strengthened media and public suspicion that Hindley’s reported rehabilitation and remorse were nothing more than a ploy to boost her chances of gaining parole. There was also similar doubt over Hindley’s claims that she had only taken part in the killings due to being bullied and blackmailed by Brady.

In 1990, Home Secretary David Waddington ruled that "life should mean life" for Hindley, who had been told by earlier Home Secretaries and High Court judges that she would have to serve a minimum of 25 and then 30 years before being considered for parole. Hindley was not informed of the decision until December 1994, following a High Court ruling that all life sentence prisoners had to be informed of their minimum sentences, and Longford later expressed his "disgust" at this ruling, comparing her imprisonment to that of Jews in Nazi Germany. By this time Hindley, who had initially thought that having "friends in high places" could only help her cause, had cut off all contact and communication with him, now considering him a liability whose "campaigning" was little more than publicity-seeking on his own behalf. She did regain contact with him again following this, however.

In February 1997, the latest Home Secretary, Michael Howard, reaffirmed the ruling that Hindley should never be freed. Subsequent Home Secretaries Jack Straw and David Blunkett also agreed with the ruling. Hindley appealed against her whole life tariff in the High Court in December 1997, November 1998 and March 2000, but each appeal was rejected. Longford maintained that she was a reformed character who was no longer a threat to society, and had qualified for parole. He regularly commented, along with several other Hindley supporters, that she was a "political prisoner" who was being kept in prison for votes, to serve the interests of a succession of Home Secretaries and their respective governments.

Home Office files would later reveal that in 1975 Longford had also lobbied various government ministers, including the Home Secretary Roy Jenkins, on Brady's behalf, as well. This resulted in Brady obtaining special treatment while remaining in the prison hospital, rather than being returned to the segregation unit. This gave him access to adolescent "youth custody" inmates; he was only removed from this privileged situation in 1982, after he was accused by several underage inmates of sexual assault. Unlike Hindley, Brady never wanted to be paroled, and remained in custody for more than 50 years until his death in May 2017 at the age of 79.

In March 1996, Longford backed up Hindley's claim in an Oxford University magazine that she was still in prison so that the Conservative government – trailing in the opinion polls since the autumn of 1992 – would win more votes. This claim was met with anger by the mothers of two of the Moors Murders victims, including Ann West, who remained at the centre of the campaign to ensure that Hindley was never released, and once again vowed to kill Hindley if she was set free. This came just weeks after the announcement that the Parole Board had declared Hindley as a low risk prisoner and recommended her transfer to an open prison. Two years later, she was moved to a medium security prison. Longford regularly condemned the media - especially The Sun newspaper - for its "exploitation" of Ann West. In 1986, Longford reportedly told Ann West that unless she forgave Hindley and Brady, she would not go to heaven when she died. He also commented that he was "tremendously sorry for her, but letting her decide Myra's fate would be ludicrous".

Hindley died in November 2002, having never been paroled - her death coming just over a week before a legal victory for another prisoner which stripped the Home Secretary of the power to set minimum terms for life sentence prisoners, and which had been widely expected to have secured Hindley’s release.

The story of Longford's campaign to free Hindley was told in the Channel 4 film Longford in 2006. Longford was played by Jim Broadbent (who won a BAFTA for his role) and Hindley was played by Samantha Morton.

== Decriminalisation of homosexuality ==
In 1956, Longford launched the first Parliamentary debate in support of the Wolfenden Report, which recommended the decriminalisation of private and consensual homosexual acts between men over the age of 21. He had been a staunch public supporter of Lord Montagu and his lover Peter Wildeblood after the two were jailed for breaking anti-gay laws in the early 1950s, and visited them regularly in prison.

In the 1960s, while continuing to support the decriminalisation of homosexuality in England and Wales, he nonetheless asserted that homosexuality was "nauseating" and that, regardless of any change in the law, it was "utterly wrongful". He was of the belief that homosexuality was something that could be "taught".

In the mid-1980s, Longford was a vocal supporter of the introduction of Section 28 by Margaret Thatcher's Conservative government and, during the Parliamentary debates, he stated his opinion that homosexuals are "handicapped people". In the late 1990s and early 2000s, he fought attempts by the Labour government to remove it. Section 28 was eventually repealed in 2003, two years after his death.

Longford's highly publicised condemnation of homosexuality in the late 1980s made him a target of comedian Julian Clary, who often satirised him in his stage shows and television appearances.

Longford also opposed any attempts to lower the age of consent for homosexual acts below 21; in 1977 and in 1994, he spoke against lowering it to 18, claiming that "the years of 18 and 19 are [...] the years when the destiny of young men may be decided for life" and that people of that age could have too easily been seduced into a homosexual lifestyle; in the early years of Tony Blair's Ministry, he criticized plans to equalise the age of consent for gay men (at that time 18) with that of heterosexual men (16), remarking in a 1998 House of Lords debate that:

...if someone seduced my daughter, it would be damaging and horrifying but not fatal. She would recover, marry and have lots of children... On the other hand, if some elderly, or not so elderly, schoolmaster seduced one of my sons and taught him to be a homosexual, he would ruin him for life. That is the fundamental distinction.

He was ultimately unsuccessful on those counts, as the age of consent for gay men was lowered to 18 in 1994 and to 16 in 2001.

== House of Lords reforms (1999) ==
Under the House of Lords Act 1999, the majority of hereditary peers lost the privilege of a seat and right to vote in the House of Lords. However, Longford was one of four living individuals who were hereditary peers of the first creation (in his case 1st Baron Pakenham). As such, he was created a life peer, and remained in the Lords as Baron Pakenham of Cowley, of Cowley in the County of Oxfordshire. At the age of 93, he became the second-oldest person to be granted a peerage (after Lord Maenan).

== Writings ==
Known for his interest in Irish history, he wrote a number of books on the topic. Peace By Ordeal: An Account from First-Hand Sources of the Negotiation and Signature of the Anglo-Irish Treaty of 1921, published in 1935, is arguably his best-known work. It documents the negotiations of the Anglo-Irish Treaty of 1921 between Irish and British representatives. His account uses primary sources from the time, many however anonymous. Commentators differ widely on its merits and reliability.

Longford came greatly to admire Éamon de Valera and was chosen as the co-author of his official biography Éamon de Valera, which was published in 1970, co-written with Thomas P. O'Neill. He campaigned for decades to have the Hugh Lane bequest pictures restored to Dublin, and with Lord Moyne and Sir Denis Mahon, brokered a compromise-sharing agreement in 1959.

== Marriage and children ==
At Oxford, Longford met his wife, Elizabeth Harman, an undergraduate at Lady Margaret Hall. Lady Longford was the author of Victoria R.I. (1964), a biography of Queen Victoria, published in the US as Born to Succeed. She also wrote a two-volume biography of the Duke of Wellington, and a volume of memoirs, The Pebbled Shore. She stood for Parliament as Labour candidate for Cheltenham in the 1935 general election and for Oxford in 1950.

The marriage produced four sons and four daughters, followed by 26 grandchildren and 18 great-grandchildren. Their children were:

- Lady Antonia Margaret Caroline Pakenham (born 27 August 1932), writer, previously married to Hugh Fraser and had six children, and then to playwright Harold Pinter until his death;
- Thomas Frank Dermot Pakenham, 8th Earl of Longford (born 14 August 1933);
- The Hon Patrick Maurice Pakenham (17 April 1937 – 8 June 2005);
- Lady Judith Elizabeth Pakenham (14 August 1940 – 18 September 2018);
- Lady Rachel Mary Pakenham (born 11 April 1942), writer, married to director Kevin Billington, four children;
- The Hon Sir Michael Aidan Pakenham KBE CMG (born 3 November 1943);
- Lady Catherine Rose Pakenham (28 February 1946 – 11 August 1969); and
- The Hon Kevin John Toussaint Pakenham (1 November 1947 – 19 July 2020).

== Death ==
Lord Longford died from heart failure at Chelsea and Westminster Hospital on 3 August 2001 at the age of 95 and was cremated at Mortlake Crematorium. He was succeeded in the earldom by his eldest son, Thomas.

The Countess of Longford died in October 2002 at the age of 96.

The then Prime Minister, Tony Blair, said of Longford after his death: "He was a great man of passionate integrity and humanity, and a great reformer committed to modernising the law, while also caring deeply for individuals".

== Arms ==
Coat of arms of Frank Pakenham, 7th Earl of Longford, KG, PC
Coronet An Earl's Coronet Crest Out of a mural crown Or a demi eagle displayed Gules beaked Or. Escutcheon Quarterly Or and Gules in dexter chief an eagle displayed Vert. Supporters Dexter a lion Azure charged on the shoulder with an escarbuncle Or sinister a griffin Azure winged Ermine beaked and membered Or. Motto GLORIA VIRTUTIS UMBRA

== See also ==
- The Longford Lectures
- The Longford Prize

== Films about Lord Longford ==
- Longford (2006): Longford's efforts to obtain parole for Moors murderer Myra Hindley were dramatised in a Channel 4 film, with Longford portrayed by Jim Broadbent, Samantha Morton as Myra Hindley, Lindsay Duncan as Lady Longford and Andy Serkis as Ian Brady.

== Books about Lord Longford ==
- Stanford, Peter (2003). The Outcast's Outcast: A Biography of Lord Longford. Stroud, UK: Sutton Publishing. pp. 512. ISBN 0-7509-3248-1.
- Fraser, Antonia (2015), My History: A Memoir of Growing Up, New York: Doubleday. [Account, both personal and political, by a daughter of Pakenham.]

Political offices
New title New government	Lord-in-waiting; 1945–1946	Succeeded by The Lord Chorley
Preceded by John Hynd	Chancellor of the Duchy of Lancaster; 1947–1948	Succeeded by Hugh Dalton
Preceded by The Lord Nathan	Minister of Civil Aviation; 1948–1951	Succeeded by The Lord Ogmore
Preceded by The Viscount Hall	First Lord of the Admiralty; 1951	Succeeded by James Thomas
Preceded by The Lord Carrington	Leader of the House of Lords; 1964–1968	Succeeded by The Lord Shackleton
Preceded by Selwyn Lloyd	Lord Privy Seal; 1964–1965	Succeeded by Sir Frank Soskice
Preceded by Anthony Greenwood	Secretary of State for the Colonies; 1965–1966	Succeeded by Frederick Lee
Preceded by Sir Frank Soskice	Lord Privy Seal; 1966–1968	Succeeded by The Lord Shackleton
Party political offices
Preceded by The Earl Alexander of Hillsborough	Leader of the Labour Party in the House of Lords; 1964–1968	Succeeded by The Lord Shackleton
Peerage of Ireland
Preceded by Edward Pakenham	Earl of Longford; 1961–2001	Succeeded by Thomas Pakenham
Peerage of the United Kingdom
New creation	Baron Pakenham; 1945–2001; Member of the House of Lords (1945–2001)	Succeeded by Thomas Pakenham
