= Kalayaan (charity) =

UK advocacy group for migrant domestic workers

Kalayaan is a United Kingdom (UK) charity which works with and to support migrant domestic workers in the UK. The word 'kalayaan' means 'freedom' in Tagalog, with over 200,000 Filipinos working in the UK as domestic workers.

Kalayaan won the 2006 Centre for Social Justice Awards

On 28 June 2008, an important step forward was made for the rights of this particularly vulnerable group of workers. In response to pressure from migrant domestic workers themselves, Kalayaan, other human rights organisations and with the unions, the UK government committed to the continued protection of migrant domestic workers in the UK and withdrew its plans to remove the domestic worker visa and with it many of the rights of this group of workers.
