= Longford Prize =

Annual award for penal or social reform

The Longford Prize is an annual award presented in the United Kingdom to an organization, group, or individuals working in the field of social or penal reform. It was established in 2002 in honour of Lord Longford, a lifelong penal reform campaigner. It is sponsored by both The Independent and The Daily Telegraph, organised in association with the Prison Reform Trust, and is presented at the annual Longford Lecture.

The prize is usually awarded to someone who has made a difference by their initiative and resourcefulness in prisoners' lives. The prize is sponsored by the McGrath Charitable Trust.

== Selection process ==
Candidates are nominated by the testimony of peers and/or persons who have benefited from their work. These submissions are reviewed by a panel of judges, members of the Prison Reform Trust and New Bridge. The panel is chaired by former prison governor and Longford Trust trustee, John Podmore.

== Past winners ==
Year	Recipient	Note
2002	Audrey Edwards	After her mentally ill son, Christopher, was murdered in Chelmsford Prison, Edwards campaigned to improve mental health care for offenders.
2003	Barbara Tudor	Awarded for her work in restorative justice
2004	Christopher Morgan and Shannon Trust	Set up the Shannon Trust in 1997, which trains prisoners to teach their fellow inmates reading and writing.
2005	Steven Taylor	Awarded to the Director of the Forum on Prisoner Education for promoting the rehabilitation and re-integration of prisoners into society.
2006	FPWP Hibiscus	FPWP Hibiscus is a small charity, working with female foreign national prisoners. Special mentions went to Chance UK, Roma Hooper, and Lucie Russell, and Smart Justice.
2007	Prisoners Abroad	Prisoners Abroad is a UK charity which supports citizens imprisoned overseas. The judges praised "its courage, persistence and humanity, over almost three decades, sometimes in the face of public and official indifference and even hostility". Special mention was given to The Forgiveness Project, Joe Baden, and the Open Book Project.
2008	HMP Grendon	The judges were impressed by the prison's track record in cutting reoffending and promoting the principles of rehabilitation. A Lifetime Achievement Award was given to Lucy Gampell, director of Action for Prisoners' Families
2009	Inquest	Inquest is a charity that provides support on state-related deaths. The judges praised it for its "remarkable perseverance, personal commitment and courage in an area too often under-investigated by the public authorities".
2010	Circles UK	A Lifetime Achievement Award was given to Peter Kilgarriff.
2011	The Clink Charity	A Lifetime Achievement Award was given to David Brown.
2012	Prisoners' Advice Service	A Lifetime Achievement Award was given to Paul Cavadino for his work with NACRO.
2013	Prison Radio Association	A Lifetime Achievement Award was made to Reverend Paul Cowley.
2014	Marina Cantecuzino	Awarded to Marina Cantecuzino, founder of The Forgiveness Project, for her "significant contribution to reducing reoffending as well as having a wider impact in creating a more positive commitment in our criminal justice system to restorative justice". A Lifetime Achievement Award was given to New Horizon Youth Centre, a drop-in day center, founded by in 1968.
2015	PACT	The judges wrote "[g]ood research and good practice have both long shown that maintaining strong family ties is one of the key factors in offenders' rehabilitation and avoidance of re-offending." Judges also highly commended the Thames Valley Partnership and In2Change, and made a Lifetime Achievement Award to Eric McGraw, of Inside Time.
2016	Unlock and Shakespeare Trilogy	The Shakespeare Trilogy is an outreach scheme by Clean Break Theatre Company, York Saint John University's Prison Partnership Project and the Donmar Warehouse, developed from over four years of workshops in women's jails. The Lifetime Achievement Award was presented to Juliet Lyon.
2017	Safe Ground	Working through dialogue, drama, and debate with serving prisoners, Safe Ground has an outstanding track record of "reaching the angry young men who commit both crimes and are the victims of crimes."
2018	Haven Distribution	Founded by Lee Humphries, the Haven Distribution has sent tens of thousands of books over two decades to prisoners in jails across the country.
2019	Switchback	They have been helping younger individuals transition back into society after leaving prison. They believe that those that can get back and transition are less likely to commit another offense.
2020	N/A	No prize awarded.
2021	Women in Prison	
2022	Brendan Ross (St Giles Trust) and Koestler Trust	Our first joint winner Brendan Ross developed and leads the St Giles’ Trust Peer Circles Project that provides employment services for people with multiple and complex needs. "Brendan’s commitment, growing out of his own lived experience, to the hardest to reach individuals in the most difficult situations truly transforms lives." Our second winner, Koestler Arts, this year celebrates the 60th anniversary of its awards which nurture creativity to encourage rehabilitation and so reduce reoffending. Its annual exhibitions of art work by prisoners in galleries around the country make a vital human connection between the prisoners who make the work and the members of the public who admire it.”
2023	JENGbA – Joint Enterprise Not Guilty by Association	“JENGbA – Joint Enterprise Not Guilty by Association - began in 2010 as a women-led, grass-roots organisation and it has grown in size, reach and effectiveness over the years since in providing nationwide frontline support for those in some of the deepest waters of our legal system who are facing joint enterprise convictions as well as their families. Impactful, tireless and strategic, it has successfully engaged with Parliament, the Law Commission, the Crown Prosecution Service and the High Court and Supreme Court to raise awareness of the case for reform. We believe JENGbA fulfils each of our criteria of courage, persistence, humanity and originality and can truly claim to be changing the system.”
2024	UNGRIPP – the United Group for Reform of IPP	“UNGRIPP – the United Group for Reform of IPP – is a vital lifeline for those still serving IPP – imprisonment for public protection – sentences as well as a highly-effective grassroots campaigning organisation, run on a small budget. Though abolished 12 years ago, IPPs keep thousands of men and women, who were sentenced before they were axed, in prison without a release date and without hope many years beyond their original IPP minimum tariff. Others struggle to restart their lives in the community while still under IPP licences where recall to prison happens often. UNGRIPP’s tireless support means they and their families are neither alone nor forgotten, while its well-targeted demand that this scar on our justice system be properly addressed daily gathers momentum.”
2025	Liberty Choir	“Music makes a difference in lives and never more so than in prison, where Liberty Choir transforms lives,” write our judges. “Built on volunteers who go into prisons to sing alongside prisoners, it has grown steadily since 2014, bringing to more and more prisons joy, much-needed and sustaining hope, peace and evidence that there is still a world out there open and willing to forgive. Its full-circle approach sees its volunteers supporting choir members when they are released, making it an exemplar at a time when such links are too few and far-between.”

== See also ==
- The Longford Trust
- The Longford Lectures
- Earl of Longford
