= St Mungo Cup =

- Location: Shawfield Stadium
- Inaugurated: 1927
- Final run: 2016

Race information
- Distance: 480 metres
- Surface: Sand

The St Mungo Cup was a greyhound competition held at Shawfield Stadium in Glasgow.

It was inaugurated in 1927 at Carntyne Stadium and established itself as one of the leading events in Scotland. Following the closure of Carntyne in 1971 the event was switched to Shawfield in 1973.

The race was discontinued after the 2009 running but was re-introduced for a one off running in 2016.

== Past winners ==
Year	Winner	Breeding	Trainer	Time	SP	Notes
1927	Arancez	Janeddar - Dulcinette	R Thomson	30.81	6-4f	
1931	Sister Olive	Lenin - Dulcinette	Collins (White City Glasgow)		2-7f	
1932	Winning Stroke		P Quinn (White City Glasgow)	31.75	6-4f	
1933	Chesterfield Emblem	Macoma - Bright Emblem	Cobridge			
1936	Olives Best	Deemster-Sister Olive	Patrick McKinney (Carntyne)	30.10	5-4f	
1937	Rather Crafty		J W Day (Private)	30.48	2-1	
1938	Kilhorn		J Taylor (White City - Newcastle)	30.35	3-1	
1939	Aye Rovin	Nazak – Batch	David Galt (Private)	30.28	16-1	
1940	Ballycureen Soldier	Noras Cutlet – Sergeants Wife	H Irving (Carntyne)	29.70	5-4f	
1941	Noble Blood		David Galt (Private)	30.28	3-1	
1942	Ballycureen Soldier	Noras Cutlet – Sergeants Wife	Michael Conroy (Carntyne)	29.96	2-1	
1943	Wildmoor Bombard	Jokers Resort – Backbiter of Wildmoor	Michael Conroy (Carntyne)	29.96	3-1	
1944	Farloe Melody	Farloe Cutlet – Roeside Moonbeam	Michael Conroy (Carntyne)	29.90	5-1	
1945	Gourna Bridge	Talon – Sheevras Sheen	R Bond (Carntyne)	30.06	4-5f	
1946	Mondays Son	Orlucks Best – Monday Next	L Hague (Belle Vue)	29.73	2-1	
1947	Lacken Invader	Munster Hills – Murex	L Hague (White City - Manchester)	29.40	6-4f	
1948	Cheerful Comedy		J W Burgess (Leeds)	29.31	1-4f	
1949	Line Command	Joint Command – Cat Pup	M Gemmell (Shawfield)	29.70	5-2	
1950	Mad Career	Mad Tanist – Brilliant Gay	Ted Brennan (Owlerton)	29.45	4-1	
1951	Black Mire	Darkies Gift – Kelton Flash	Jack Toseland (Perry Barr)	29.64	1-2f	
1953	Ollys Pal	Bellas Prince – Quare Fire	Norman Merchant (Private)	29.30	1-4f	
1954	Rushton Mac	Rushton News – Rushton Panda	Frank Johnson (Private)	28.92	5-1	
1957	Ballycaum Champ	The Grand Champion – Miss Murex	Joe Booth (Private)	29.81	5-2	
1958	Dramatic Darkie	Sandown Champion – Dramatic Victory	Alan Lake (Carntyne)	29.24	14-1	
1959	Drumskea Chieftain	The Grand Champion – Drumskea Colleen	Harry Ward (Powderhall)	29.45	6-1	
1960	Just Fame	Colebreene Bell – More Fame	Tom Johnston Jr. (Carntyne)	29.35	4-6f	
1961	Desert Rambler	Champion Prince – Imperial Peg	Joe Booth (Private)	29.25		
1962	Poetic Licence	Knockrour Again – Tanyard Tan	Joe Booth (Private)	28.71		
1963	We'll See	Knock Hill Chieftain – Bunnykins	Tom Johnston Jr. (Carntyne)	28.95		
1964	Kings Bench	Champion Trip – Jerrys Blossom	Bryce Wilson (Private)	29.24	1-1f	
1965	Flemingstown	Jungle Man – Leg It Lucy	Tommy Kane (Private)	29.70		
1966	Rathpeacon	Solar Prince – How About That	Bill 'Willie' Weir (Private)	29.28		
1967	Ballinamon Game	The Grand Canal – Ballinamona Love	Harry Ward (Powderhall)	29.66		
1968	Ho Ho Silver	Hurry There – Silver Isle	Norman Oliver (Brough Park)	30.07		
1970	Ballybeg Flash	Prairie Flash – Knock Late	Joe Booth (Private)	29.00		
1971	Glittering Man	Always Proud – Glittering Jacqueline		28.86		
1972	Pit Lamp	Booked Out – Ballingaddy Fly	Norman Oliver (Brough Park)	29.30	3-1	
1974	Blessington Boy	Monalee Champion – The Powder Plot	Bill 'Willie' Weir (Shawfield)	28.80	7-2	
1975	Lianda Rebel	Sole Aim – Dance Till Dawn	Charlie Coyle (Private)	29.20		
1976	Broken Secret	Own Pride – Flaming Liberty	Norman Oliver (Brough Park)	30.79	6-4	
1977	Broken Secret	Own Pride – Flaming Liberty	Norman Oliver (Brough Park)	30.12	12-1	
1978	All Wit	Monalee Champion - Dunally	Frank Baldwin (Perry Barr)	30.70	4-7f	
1979	Kilbelin Ruler	Supreme Fun – Duritza	George Barnett (White City - Manchester)	30.84		
1980	Decoy Duke	Westmead County – Rip Madam	Joe Cobbold (Cambridge)	31.03		
1981	Solos Style	Ivy Hall Solo – Social Outcast	Ray Andrews (Leeds)	30.83	6-1	
1982	Pineapple Barrow	Ballyard Band – Pineapple Grand	Barbara Compton (Cradley Heath)	30.22	6-1	
1983	Go Winston	Let Him Go – Dark Bird	Ralph Smith (Perry Barr)	30.01		
1988	Gino	Ballyheigue Moon – Model Snowdrop	John McGee Sr. (Canterbury)	30.04	1-1f	
1989	Bawnard It	Special Merchant – Bawnard Mona	John McGee Sr. (Canterbury)	30.21	4-5f	
1990	Meadowbank Lad	Dutch Delight – City Rose	John Flaherty (Powderhall)	30.53	6-1	
1991	Glenpark Again	Whisper Wishes – Ballycrine Style	Willie Frew (Shawfield)	30.39	7-1	
1992	Comrades Delight	Nightpark Lad – Fine Selection	John Flaherty (Shawfield)	30.83	5-4f	
1993	Carloway Dancer	Greenpark Fox – Prize Dancer	Fraser Black (Ireland)	30.06	1-1f	
1994	Droopys Alfie	Im Slippy – Droopys Aliysa	Jimmy Gibson (Belle Vue)	30.44	2-1	
1995	Blissful Jamie	Kyle Jack – Metric Deb	Fraser Black (Ireland)	29.20	7-2	
1996	Pond Bogart	Randy – Pond Mosquito	Harry Williams (Sunderland)	29.72	5-2	
1997	Pottos Storm	Droopys Fintan – Certain Way	David Mullins (Romford)	29.23	5-1	
1998	Trump Card	Boyne Walk – Wandering Ace	Archie Carmichael (Shawfield)	29.56	10-1	
1999	Laughan Gale	Slaneyside Hare – Have A Cigar	Gerald Parsons (Private)	29.54	4-1	
2000	Popalong Fred	Frightful Flash – Popalong Mystery	Anne Stirling (Shawfield)	29.66	7-2	
2001	Carloway Vito	Smooth Rumble – Dancers Delight	Graeme Frew (Private)	29.79	5-4f	
2002	Baliff King	Spiral Nikita - Setscrew	Ian Aylward (Private)	29.48	6-4f	
2003	Daleridge Prince	Jamella Prince- Newlawn Holly	Jim Little (Swindon)	29.13	5-2	
2004	Velvet Rebel	Top Honcho – Mickdel Tina	Charlie Lister OBE (Private)	29.12	9-4	
2005	Hey Jasper	Barney The Bold – Pinetree Betty	Gary Carmichael (Powderhall)	29.23	10-1	
2006	Rhincrew Stevie	Daves Mentor – Rhincrew Armada	Kelly Macari (Sunderland)	29.93	6-1	
2007	Wright Signal	Hondo Black – Farloe Signal	Elaine Parker (Sheffield)	29.41	5-4f	
2008	Jethart Jackie	Top Honcho - Jackies Lady	Julie Bateson (Private)	28.79	5-1	
2009	Ardkill Tunoco	Kiowa Sweet Trey – Ardaghs Jodie	Julie Bateson (Private)	29.36	5-2	
2016	Killieford Kane	Razldazl George - Doodle Doo	Neil Black (Private)	29.30	1-1f	

Discontinued

== Venues & Distances ==
- 1927-1971 (Carntyne 500y)
- 1955-1956 (Not held)
- 1975-2009 (Shawfield 480m)
- 2010-2015 (Not held)
- 2016-2016 (Shawfield 480m)
- Discontinued

== Sponsors ==
- 2005-2007 Jordan Electrics
- 2008-2008 XL Limousine
- 2009-2009 ibetx.com
- 2016-2016 Kai Laidlaw
