= 1939 UK & Ireland Greyhound Racing Year =

The 1939 UK & Ireland Greyhound Racing Year was the 14th year of greyhound racing in the United Kingdom and the 13th year of greyhound racing in Ireland.

== Roll of honour ==
Major Winners
Award	Name of Winner
1939 English Greyhound Derby	Highland Rum
1939 Irish Greyhound Derby	Marchin 'Thro' Georgia
1939 Scottish Greyhound Derby	Misty Law II

== Summary ==
Despite the outbreak of World War II, another ten tracks opened, buoyed on by the attendances and profits generated. Attendances and totalisator turnover at National Greyhound Racing Club (NGRC) licensed tracks was on course for a record year but was disrupted, with many tracks closing in the latter part of the year. A record 92,000 attended the 1939 English Greyhound Derby final at White City and the totalisator turnover for the final was £14,341 and for the meeting it was £114,780 which set a new record for a greyhound meeting. The race was won by Highland Rum.

The leading greyhound company, the Greyhound Racing Association (GRA) saw reduced profits, due to the closure of their London tracks from September. The operating net profit for 1939 was £151,000 and attendances at GRA tracks increased rose to 3,808,994.

== Tracks ==
Oxford Stadium was one of twelve known tracks to open during the year, it was opened on 31 March by Lord Denham of the NGRC. Just four days later Lord Denham was opening the new Dagenham Greyhound Stadium. Castleford Whitwood Stadium raced for the first time and the Hull Kingston Rovers rugby league team sold the Craven Park stadium to the Greyhound Racing Company following financial difficulties. Ten thousand attended the first meeting at the City Stadium in Norwich.

Clapton Stadium underwent renovation and Bristol Rovers F.C. sold Eastville Stadium to the Bristol Greyhound Company for £12,000. The first General Manager was Lieut-Col Forsdike who was to become secretary of the NGRC. A successful professional punter called Len Franklin bought the flapping track site in West Caister with plans to open a new stadium.

Many tracks closed or were refused licences during 1939, for various reasons including the threat of bombing, staffing shortages and requisitioning by the authorities. Several would never reopen such as Battersea and Brixton.

=== Tracks opened ===
Date	Stadium/Track	Location	Ref
20 February	Armadale Stadium	Armadale	
31 March	Oxford Stadium	Oxford	
4 April	Dagenham Greyhound Stadium	London	
?? April	Castleford Whitwood Stadium	Castleford	
24 April	Worksop Greyhound Stadium	Worksop	
?? May	Longford Greyhound Stadium	Longford	
17 June	Humbug Park	Crossgates	
25 July	City Stadium	Norwich	
unknown date	Target Hill Greyhound Track	Hawick	
unknown date	Askern Greyhound Stadium	Askern	
unknown date	Chesterfield Sports Stadium	Chesterfield	
unknown date	Kinsley Greyhound Stadium	Kinsley	

== Competitions ==
Two new major events were introduced, the Birmingham Cup at Perry Barr and the Essex Vase at Romford Greyhound Stadium.

The Oaks and Pall Mall were suspended before their 1939 running and return in 1945. Juvenile Classic reached a second Grand National final coming home three lengths behind the winner Valiant Bob and Grosvenor Ferdinand upset the odds at Catford Stadium by holding off the challenge of hot favourite Black Peter by a head in the Gold Collar final.

Carmel Ash who finished runner-up to Highland Rum in the Derby final finished fourth behind Misty Law II in the Scottish Greyhound Derby final. The Scurry Gold Cup at the end of July went to a Derby Greyhound Stadium trained hound Silver Wire. Orlucks Best was one length behind Silver Wire and was representing trainer Charlie Ashley for a third consecutive final, winning one and finishing second twice and Gold Collar champion Grosvenor Ferdinand was third. Gayhunter switched kennels from Harry Buck to Eddie Wright who steered the greyhound to the St Leger crown in November.

== News ==
All identity books were microphotoed and stored in secret in case they were lost during the war years.

== Ireland ==
The Irish provincial tracks had pressured the Irish Coursing Club since 1932, for the right to stage Ireland's premier event, the Irish Greyhound Derby which had been exclusively run in Dublin. During a vote in 1939, the club agreed to let Limerick Greyhound Stadium host the race and Cork Greyhound Stadium would hold the 1941 version.

Despite the Irish Derby prize money decreasing, the event at Limerick was a success. Marchin' Thro' Georgia impressed throughout. Even two track records by other greyhounds failed to stop the red fawn dog from going through the competition unbeaten. The runner-up and one of the two track record breakers, Irish Rambler was bought by English buyers and sent to West Ham Stadium. The trend of selling the best Irish hounds to England would continue for many years because of the purchasing power of the English and in particular the London owners.

== Principal UK races ==
Grand National, White City (May 20, 525y h, £300)
Pos	Name of Greyhound	Trainer	SP	Time (sec)	Trap
1st	Valiant Bob	Paddy Fortune	8-1	30.50	6
2nd	Lemon Produce	Jerry Hannafin	8-1	30.58	2
3rd	Juvenile Classic	Joe Harmon	11-10f	30.74	3
4th	Printer	Paddy McEllistrim	4-1	31.22	5
5th	Baltinglass Hope	Montague Howard	4-1	31.54	4

Gold Collar, Catford (June 3, 440y, £500)
Pos	Name of Greyhound	Trainer	SP	Time	Trap
1st	Grosvenor Ferdinand	F S Rolfe	13-2	25.92	6
2nd	Black Peter	Stan Raymond	1-1f	25.94	2
3rd	Return Fare II	Albert Jonas	7-1	26.00	3
4th	Congleton Tiger	Bert Heyes	20-1	26.12	5
5th	Trevs Despatch	Johnny Bullock	3-1	27.32	4
6th	Gay Restorer	Wilfred Taylor	100-6	27.40	1

Scottish Greyhound Derby, Carntyne (Jul 8, 525y, £300)
Pos	Name of Greyhound	Trainer	SP	Time	Trap
1st	Misty Law II	James Anderson	5-1	29.60	6
2nd	Keeries Pride	Harry Buck	3-1	29.76	5
3rd	Ballycurreen Soldier	Patrick McKinney	20-1	29.77	1
4th	Carmel Ash	Eddie Wright	4-1	29.89	3
5th	Sporty Offer	Albert Jonas	12-1	29.93	4
6th	Selsey Cutlet	Leslie Reynolds	5-4f	29.97	2

Scurry Gold Cup, Clapton (Jul 29, 400y, £500)
Pos	Name of Greyhound	Trainer	SP	Time	Trap
1st	Silver Wire	C.J.Green	9-4f	23.52	6
2nd	Orlucks Best	Charlie Ashley	7-2	23.60	1
3rd	Grosvenor Ferdinand	F S Rolfe	3-1	23.72	5
4th	Half A Mo	Johnny Bullock	100-8	23.80	3
5th	Trevs Despatch	Johnny Bullock	4-1	23.96	4
6th	Larry of Waterhall	Bill Cowell	100-8	24.16	2

Laurels, Wimbledon (Aug 11, 500y, £700)
Pos	Name of Greyhound	Trainer	SP	Time	Trap
1st	Musical Duke	Cornelius Crowley	1-1f	28.42	5
2nd	Ballydancer	Sidney Orton	3-1		6
3rd	Return Fare II	Albert Jonas	7-1		4
4th	Abbeylara	Leslie Reynolds	100-8		3
5th	Ballyjoker	Sidney Orton	11-2		2
6th	Roe Side Scottie	Michael Downey	20-1		1

St Leger, Wembley (Nov 6, 700y, £126)
Pos	Name of Greyhound	Trainer	SP	Time	Trap
1st	Gayhunter	Eddie Wright	7-4	41.79	2
2nd	Colonel of Waterhall	Leslie Carpenter	100-6	41.99	1
3rd	Ballyjoker	Sidney Orton	8-1	42.23	4
4th	Gretas Rosary	Eddie Wright	10-1	42.24	5
5th	Ballydancer	Sidney Orton	11-8f	42.26	3
6th	Great Record	Eddie Wright	10-1	42.36	6
