= 1964 UK & Ireland Greyhound Racing Year =

The 1964 UK & Ireland Greyhound Racing Year was the 39th year of greyhound racing in the United Kingdom and the 38th year of greyhound racing in Ireland.

== Roll of honour ==
Major Winners
Award	Name of Winner
1964 English Greyhound Derby	Hack up Chieftain
1964 Irish Greyhound Derby	Wonder Valley
1964 Scottish Greyhound Derby	Hi Imperial
1964 Welsh Greyhound Derby	Davo's Rink
Greyhound Trainer of the Year	Harry Bamford
Greyhound of the Year	Lucky Hi There

== Summary ==
The Dagenham Coup incident that took place at Dagenham Greyhound Stadium on 30 June 1964 took all the headlines and became one of the most infamous moments in greyhound racing history.

Despite the government reducing the totalisator tax to 5% from 10%, the industry saw a further fall in attendances. The National Greyhound Racing Club (NGRC) affiliated tracks saw 11,208,657 paying customers at 6011 meetings with tote turnover of £50,178,166.

== Tracks ==
The Greyhound Racing Association (GRA) acquired Catford Stadium. Crayford & Bexleyheath Stadium owners Northumbrian and Crayford Trust Ltd joined the Totalisator Holdings group, owners of six other tracks. The Liverpool tracks of Seaforth Greyhound Stadium and White City Stadium (Liverpool) re-joined the NGRC set up after spells as independent tracks.

A new independent opened called the Boston Sports Stadium in New Hammond Beck Road but the worrying trend of tracks closing continued. Lythalls Lane Stadium in Coventry closed and was sold for redevelopment as a housing estate, with the prestigious Eclipse Stakes switching to Kings Heath Stadium in Birmingham. The owners of the Coventry track also owned the Brandon Speedway Stadium and had plans to bring greyhounds there. The other tracks to close were Blackpool Greyhound Stadium, Darnall Stadium and the independent Northampton track.

== Competitions ==
Cranog Bet won a second consecutive Oaks at Harringay Stadium which led to her being voted bitch of the year for the second year running. She won 18 of her 24 open races in 1964.

The greyhound of the year award went to a black dog called Lucky Hi There, whelped in November 1961. He switched to the longer trip after appearing the year before in the Laurels final and the Gold Collar final in May, where it was soon apparent that his future lay in stayer's races. He duly performed superbly and won the Cambridgeshire, Orient Cup, Wimbledon Spring Cup, Wembley Gold Cup and Scottish St Leger. In his first classic of the year at Wembley he won the St Leger title and was well on the way to eventually going sixteen races before finally being beaten, just three short of Mick the Miller's record. During 1964 he won 27 of his 35 races.

== News ==
Trainer George Waterman died which came as a shock to the industry. He had started the early part of the year impressively, by winning the Gold Collar, the Pall Mall Stakes, Cloth of Gold, Coronation Cup and Springbok. Wimbledon Stadium would appoint Nora Gleeson to fill the gap left at the Burhill kennel range. White City recruited trainer Randolph Singleton from sister track Belle Vue Stadium.

We'll See (the 1963 greyhound of the year) died on his way back to the GRA kennels at Northaw while in transit after heart failure; he had just won a heat of the Birmingham Cup.

== Principal UK races ==
Grand National, White City (April 25 525y h, £500)
Pos	Name of Greyhound	Trainer	SP	Time	Trap
1st	Two Aces	Jimmy Rimmer	10-11f	30.42	1
2nd	Clerihan Reckless	Wally Hancox	100-8	30.48	6
3rd	Fairyfield Surprise	G.Jackson	3-1	30.68	2
4th	Oyster Haven		100-8	30.69	5
5th	Prince Fodda	Stan Martin	25-1	30.72	3
6th	Rathaney Streak	Joe Pickering	6-1	30.84	4

BBC Sportsview TV Trophy Powderhall (Apr 29, 880y, £1,000)
Pos	Name of Greyhound	Trainer	SP	Time	Trap
1st	Hillstride	Tom Perry	6-4f	51.37	2
2nd	Pigalle Prince	Peter Collett	2-1	51.53	3
3rd	Miss Elegant	Paddy Keane	10-1	52.17	4
4th	Kilkeran Prince	Glasgow	9-2	52.19	1
5th	Buckwheat	Reg Webb	8-1	52.35	5
6th	Joystick	Harry Bamford	7-2	52.47	6

Gold Collar, Catford (May 16, 570y, £1,000)
Pos	Name of Greyhound	Trainer	SP	Time	Trap
1st	Mighty Wind	George Waterman	33-1	33.36	2
2nd	Misty Chieftain	Adam Jackson	10-11f	33.37	1
3rd	Clifden Orbit	Tom Johnston Jr.	10-1	33.37	4
4th	Ballymurn Chief	Ernie Butler	5-1	33.53	3
5th	Hillside Buck	Gunner Smith	40-1	33.61	6
6th	Lucky Hi There	Jimmy Jowett	5-2	33.77	5

Welsh Derby, Arms Park (Jul 4, 525y £500)
Pos	Name of Greyhound	Trainer	SP	Time	Trap
1st	Davo's Rink	Tom Baldwin	9-4	28.84	2
2nd	Captain Pike	Phil Rees Sr.	5-1	29.40	3
3rd	Sallys Story	Tony Dennis	1-1f	29.46	6
4th	King Dick	Phil Rees Sr.	100-6	29.62	5
5th	Cahara Jet	Joe De Mulder	7-1	29.74	4
6th	Rito		100-8	29.90	1

Oaks, Harringay (Jul 4, 525y, £500)
Pos	Name of Greyhound	Trainer	SP	Time	Trap
1st	Cranog Bet	Phil Rees Sr.	4-9f	29.02+	2
2nd	Surprise	Bette Godwin	8-1	30.06	1
3rd	Flying Sherry	Ken Moody	8-1	30.09	6
4th	Peace Sprite	Jimmy Quinn	25-1	30.11	5
5th	Lisheeghan Lady		5-1	30.15	4
6th	Hi Cola	Bill Kelly	20-1	30.25	3

+Equalled Track record

Scurry Gold Cup, Clapton (Jul 18, 400y £1,000)
Pos	Name of Greyhound	Trainer	SP	Time	Trap
1st	Salthill Sand	John Bassett	100-6	22.72	6
2nd	Lucky Land		100-8	23.46	2
3rd	Ballinasloe Fred	Bill Kelly	10-1	23.47	4
4th	Cranog Bet	Phil Rees Sr.	8-13f	24.05	1
5th	Kans	Jack Harvey	7-2	24.29	5
6th	Light Headed	Gordon Hodson	100-8	24.35	3

Laurels, Wimbledon (Aug 14, 500y, £1,000)
Pos	Name of Greyhound	Trainer	SP	Time	Trap
1st	Conna Count	Dennis Hannafin	100-7	28.08	1
2nd	Pineapple Joe	Dennis Hannafin	10-11f	28.18	3
3rd	Kans	Jack Harvey	5-2	28.20	5
4th	Captain Pike	Phil Rees Sr.	100-8	28.44	4
5th	Ferns Con	Mrs.J.Reeve	5-1	28.45	6
6th	Outcast Roger		25-1	28.55	2

St Leger, Wembley (Aug 31, 700y, £1,000)
Pos	Name of Greyhound	Trainer	SP	Time	Trap
1st	Lucky Hi There	Jimmy Jowett	1-2f	39.90	4
2nd	Slow Traveller	Frank Conlon	8-1	40.10	3
3rd	Shangris Captain	A.M.Bennett	100-8	40.34	1
4th	Failte Mal	Bill Dash	5-1	40.42	5
5th	Clifden Orbit	Tom Johnston Jr.	7-1	40.43	2
N/R	Automation	Phil Rees Sr.			6

Scottish Greyhound Derby, Carntyne (Sep 5, 525y, £750)
Pos	Name of Greyhound	Trainer	SP	Time	Trap
1st	Hi Imperial	Tom Johnston Jr.	20-1	29.13	6
2nd	Private Gun	Tommy Kane	5-1	29.14	2
3rd	Crazy Platinum	Bessie Lewis	8-1	29.22	3
4th	Lowfield King	P.O'Loughlin	6-1	29.36	4
5th	O'Leary	Jim Hookway	4-7f	29.39	1
6th	Scamp Boy	Bessie Lewis	6-1	29.43	5

Cesarewitch, West Ham (Oct 2, 600y, £1,000)
Pos	Name of Greyhound	Trainer	SP	Time	Trap
1st	Clifden Orbit	Tom Johnston Jr.	4-1	33.08	6
2nd	Ring Roller	Jack Kinsley	12-1	33.14	1
3rd	Pineapple Joe	Dennis Hannafin	10-1	33.34	3
4th	Failte Mal	Bill Dash	8-13f	33.62	4
5th	Denises Pride	Randy Singleton	20-1	33.65	2
6th	Slow Traveller	Frank Conlon	5-1	33.68	5

== Principal Irish races ==
Produce Stakes, Clonmel (May 13, 525y £1,000)
Pos	Name of Greyhound	Trainer	Time
1st	Mothel Chief	Paddy Dunphy	29.70
2nd	Vales Corner		30.18
3rd	Lucky Break		30.58
4th	Greenane Flame		30.78
u	Kileden Chief		
u	Rattle the Jungle		

St Leger, Limerick (Jul 11, 550y £1,000)
Pos	Name of Greyhound	Trainer	Time
1st	Brook Jockey	P Boyce	31.66
2nd	Kylepark Special		31.72
3rd	Solo Jungle		32.00
4th	Honey Fitz		32.16
u	Lovely Fashion		
u	November King		

Laurels, Cork (Sep 12, 525y £1,250)
Pos	Name of Greyhound	Trainer	Time
1st	Tanyard Heather	P Cashman	29.20
2nd	Good Brandy		29.36
3rd	Seagulls Ltd		29.76
4th	Tanyard There		29.92
u	Brindle John		
u	Bimco		

Oaks, Harold's Cross (Sep 18, 525y £1,000)
Pos	Name of Greyhound	Trainer	Time
1st	Knock Her	T O’Shaughnessy	29.98
2nd	Have A Mink		30.10
3rd	Bally Minorca		30.11
4th	Venpact		30.35
u	Weed Pest		
u	Brandon View		

u=unplaced

== Totalisator returns ==
Extended content

The totalisator returns declared to the licensing authorities for the year 1964 are listed below.

Stadium	Turnover £
London (White City)	4,817,765
London (Harringay)	3,157,901
London (Wimbledon)	2,477,246
London (Walthamstow)	2,367,934
London (Wembley)	2,178,577
London (Clapton)	1,757,020
London (Catford)	1,704,894
Manchester (Belle Vue)	1,699,762
London (West Ham)	1,677,282
London (Wandsworth)	1,552,680
London (Stamford Bridge)	1,124,298
London (Hendon)	1,121,676
London (New Cross)	1,094,011
Romford	1,078,854
Edinburgh (Powderhall)	1,052,195
Manchester (White City)	1,016,507
Birmingham (Perry Barr, old)	980,477
Glasgow (Shawfield)	904,791
London (Park Royal)	896,739
Brighton & Hove	841,553

Stadium	Turnover £
London (Hackney)	823,797
Birmingham (Hall Green)	766,837
Slough	723,168
Glasgow (White City)	713,322
Leeds (Elland Road)	685,494
Crayford & Bexleyheath	672,566
Southend-on-Sea	652,600
Manchester (Salford)	623,516
Newcastle (Brough Park)	610,007
Bristol (Eastville)	608,358
Wolverhampton (Monmore)	589,489
Newcastle (Gosforth)	543,663
Willenhall	542,387
Cardiff (Arms Park)	541,252
London (Dagenham)	534,336
Ramsgate (Dumpton Park)	496,702
Bradford (Greenfield)	490,951
Sheffield (Owlerton)	486,339
Reading (Oxford Road)	484,672

Stadium	Turnover £
Birmingham (Kings Heath)	463,246
Gloucester & Cheltenham	424,472
Liverpool (White City)	415,753
Glasgow (Carntyne)	391,829
Derby	372,172
Poole	338,888
Oxford	331,782
Rochester & Chatham	314,635
Gateshead	303,070
Middlesbrough	287,248
Liverpool (Seaforth)	285,094
Hull (Old Craven Park)	243,075
Aberdeen	239,323
Leicester (Blackbird Rd)	234,056
Nottingham (White City)	230,844
South Shields	218,345
Portsmouth	200,560
Preston	198,701
Norwich (City)	127,804
