= 1940 English Greyhound Derby =

- Location: Harringay Stadium (heats White City Stadium)
- Start date: 18 June
- End date: 8 July
- Total prize money: £1,000 (winner)

The 1940 Greyhound Derby took place during June and July with the final being held on Monday 8 July 1940 at Harringay Stadium. The winner G.R.Archduke, owned by Mr. O.G Leach, received a first prize of £1,000. The event took place at Harringay because the traditional venue of White City was closed after the first round due to the war. This Derby became known as the 'Silent Derby' due to the impending war and following the final the Derby was postponed until 1945.

== Final result ==
At Harringay (over 525 yards):

Position	Name of Greyhound	Breeding	Trap	SP	Time	Trainer
1st	G.R.Archduke	Ataxy - Gay Revels	1	100-7	29.66*	Charlie Ashley (Harringay)
2nd	Duna Taxmaid	Ataxy - Brightoma	4	8-1	29.69	Eric Hiscock (Harringay)
3rd	Rock Callan	Fine Jubilee - Ripe Cherry	2	7-4f	29.73	Joe Harmon (Wimbledon)
4th	Keel Creamery	Creamery Border - Keel Ruby	6	5-2	29.81	Joe Harmon (Wimbledon)
5th	Irish Rambler	Culrain - Little Eva	5	13-2	29.97	Dal Hawkesley (West Ham)
6th	Roving Youth	Wenlock Snowball - Rudgeway Rattle	3	3-1	30.13	Albert Jonas (Stamford Bridge)

=== Distances ===
Neck, ½, 1, 1, 1 (lengths)
The distances between the greyhounds are in finishing order and shown in lengths. From 1927 to 1950 one length was equal to 0.06 of one second but race times are shown as 0.08 as per modern day calculations.

== Review ==
The Derby finally got the go ahead to take place after problems concerning a possible government ban on racing. Main protagonists heading for White City on 18 June included defending champion Highland Rum, Junior Classic and 1939 Irish Greyhound Derby runner up Irish Rambler.

The heats got underway and Rock Callan recorded the fastest time, a fast 29.26, Highland Rum, Junior Classic and Irish Rambler all won their heats. The GRA ban on racing at White City left the competition in limbo because the ban came into effect after the first round. It was announced that the Derby was to continue at Harringay which upset many including MP's and the national press.

Just four days later the second round did take place at Harringay. Keel Creamery (5-2) and Proof Spirit II (4-1) trained by W Lacey at Walthamstow Stadium provided the first two winners. Roving Youth (11-8f) claimed the third heat and only Rock Callan (10-11f) progressed unbeaten. Defending champion Highland Rum finished third in his race but fell afoul of the stewards and was disqualified for fighting which allowed the fourth place greyhound G.R Archduke to make it through to the semi-finals in his place. Junior Classic was also eliminated at this stage.

The first semi-final went to Keel Creamery (4-1) from Duna Taxmaid and favourite Roving Youth in 29.69. GR Archduke born at the GRA Hook kennels at Northaw was a shock winner of the second semi-final at odds of 10–1; Rock Callan a strong 5-4f, finished half a length behind with Irish Rambler another half back.

GR Archduke soon led Irish Rambler around the first bend in the final, the pair challenged until the fourth bend when Irish Rambler faded and Duna Taxmaid showed and challenged on the run in, GR Archduke moved wide towards Duna Taxmaid but held on by a neck. There was an opinion that GR Archduke, who had previously been disqualified in his career, had fought again, a view opposed by the Greyhound Express. Owner Mr O.G.Leach would hold the trophy for four years until the return of the event in 1945.

== See also ==
- 1940 UK & Ireland Greyhound Racing Year
