= SMH Group Stadium =

Football stadium in Whittington Moor, England

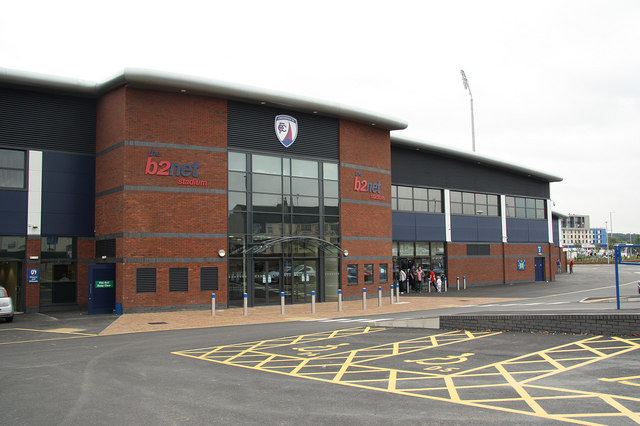
- Interactive map of SMH Group Stadium
- Former names: b2net Stadium (2010–2012); Proact Stadium (2012–2020); Technique Stadium (2020–2023)
- Location: 1866 Sheffield Road; Whittington Moor; Chesterfield; Derbyshire; S41 8NZ
- Coordinates: 53°15′13″N 1°25′33″W
- Owner: Chesterfield Football Club
- Capacity: 10,292
- Surface: Grass

Construction
- Groundbreaking: 23 July 2009
- Opened: 2010
- Cost: £13,000,000
- Architect: Ward McHugh Associates
- General contractor: GB Building Solutions

Tenants
- Chesterfield (2010–present)

SMH Group Stadium is an all-seater football stadium in Whittington Moor, Chesterfield, Derbyshire, on the site of the former Dema Glassworks. It is the home of Chesterfield Football Club, replacing Saltergate as the club's stadium from the start of the 2010–11 season.

The stadium is known as Chesterfield FC Stadium when hosting England youth international games.

It has a capacity of approximately 10,500, cost £13 million to build and was designed by Sheffield-based architects Ward McHugh Associates.

The stadium staged England under-19 and under-21 fixtures in 2011 and May 2012 with nearly 10,000 fans, and hosted Elton John in 2012.

== History ==
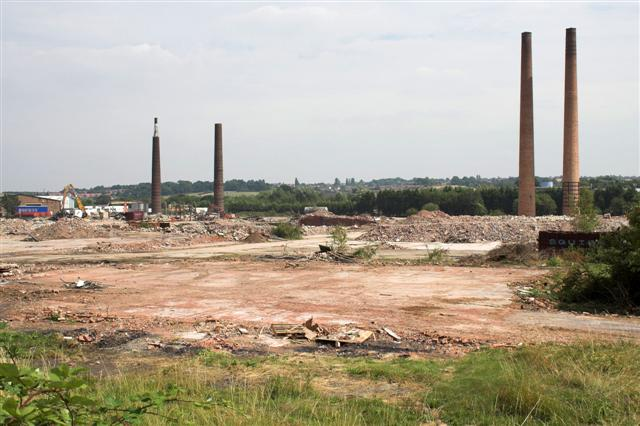
Dema Glassworks, before the construction of the stadium

The Dema Glass site emerged as a possible location in October 2004 at a time when the club were already pursuing planning permission to redevelop Wheeldon Mill, the town's former greyhound stadium. Chesterfield Borough Council viewed the site as part of a masterplan to regenerate the A61 corridor, an area to the north of the town centre and including the Chesterfield Canal. Agreement in principle between the club and local authority was struck in February 2005, though progress faced initial delays.

Designs for the proposed new stadium were provided by local architects Ward McHugh Associates, who had previously undertaken commissions on the redevelopment of the South Stand at Twickenham and at Goodison Park.

Planning permission was granted after a public meeting held on 1 July 2008, with the plans forming part of a wider mixed-use development. The land at the site was handed over to the club in February 2009 and, after decontamination, construction officially started on Thursday 23 July 2009, overseen by GB Development Solutions. Separate buildings which formed part of the overall scheme included a Tesco Extra superstore, Tesco petrol station, a KFC restaurant, an Enterprise car rental and other office facilities.

The new stadium was handed over to the club in July 2010 and granted its full capacity licence from the Safety Advisory Group after hosting two limited capacity games against Derby County and Barnsley.

A music video for the single "Run Away Instead" by indie rock band The Rosadocs was filmed on the pitch in August 2021, the first music video to have been shot at the stadium.

== Name changes ==
Initial sponsorship under the name the b2net Stadium was revealed on 14 August 2009. However, after two seasons and following the acquisition of b2net by Swedish company Proact, the renaming of the stadium to the 'Proact Stadium' was officially announced on 13 August 2012. Due to UEFA restrictions, when it hosts England youth matches it is known as Chesterfield FC Stadium.

The stadium was renamed to the Technique Stadium in August 2020, and renamed again to the SMH Group Stadium in June 2023.

== Stands and facilities ==
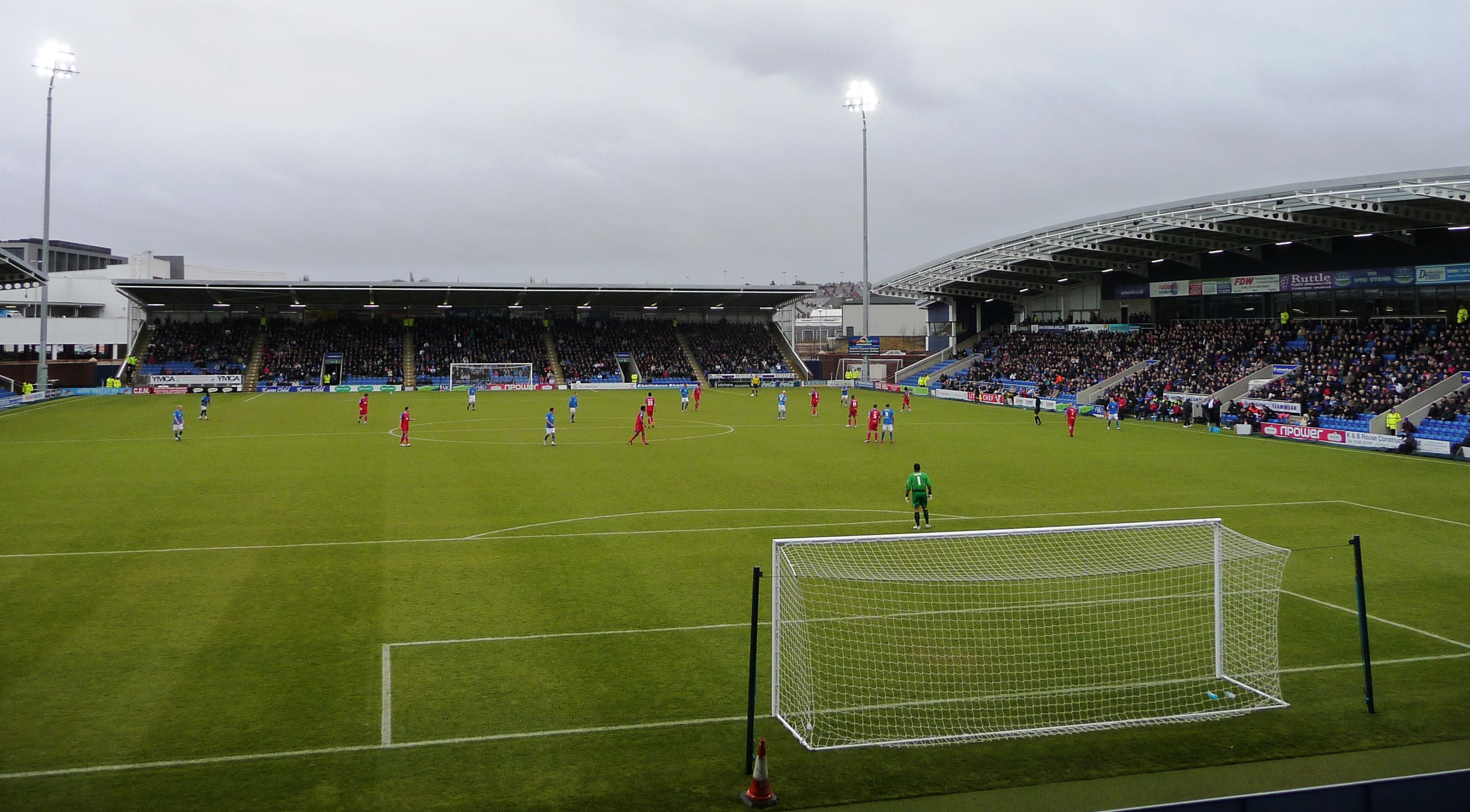
South Stand and West Stand viewed from the North Stand

The ground's four stands are The LMD Vacuum Excavation (West) Stand, Motan Colortronic (South) Stand, Auto Windscreen (North) Stand and The Chesterfield College Community (East) Stand. Unlike Chesterfield's former stadium, Saltergate, all stands enjoy unrestricted views.

=== The LMD Vacuum Excavation (West) Stand ===
The LMD Vacuum Excavation (West) Stand has a curved roofline and a capacity of 3,144 seats with glazed windshields on either side and executive facilities at the rear. The stand includes conference rooms and banqueting rooms, including the Leengate Legends Lounge, and is where the majority of the club's non-footballing revenue is generated. The stand is sponsored by VanYard.

=== Motan Colortronic (South) Stand ===
Located behind the goal on the south side of the stadium, this stand is regarded as similar to the former Saltergate Kop in being the area where the main atmosphere is created by home supporters. Its capacity is 2,064 seats.

=== The Auto Windscreen (North) Stand ===
The north stand is almost identical to the south stand, the exception being the north stand has one disabled gantry compared to two in the south stand. At the time the ground opened, the north stand was called the Printability Stand.

=== The Chesterfield College Community (East) Stand ===
Like the main stand, the east stand has a curved roofline but with no executive facilities at the rear. It includes a multi-purpose sports and community room, sports injury clinic, meeting rooms, a gym and healthy living resource for all ages, a wave pool for rehabilitation, heritage room, classroom resource centre for local education, a soft play area for youngsters, and a cafeteria. For league games, away fans are seated in this stand at the northern end. The stand can accommodate 1,055 visiting supporters. The total capacity is 3,190 seats. At the time the ground opened, the East Stand was called the Midlands Co-operative Community Stand.

All four stands encompass concourse facilities under the stand, including on-tap beverages and multiple television screens showing the game in progress, and Sky Sports channels before and after the game.

=== The HUB ===
On the exterior of the East Stand is a £1.7m community facility called The HUB. This two-story building was opened in September 2013 by the Chesterfield FC Community Trust. The HUB includes a cafe, "Chester's Den", a playcentre, a gym, a therapy pool, a multi-use sports hall and classrooms. The facility also houses the offices of the Trust as well as other tenants and a martial arts dojo.

=== Chesterfield FC Memorial Garden ===
A memorial garden was opened in September 2014. Built by the Supporters' Club and now maintained by the Chesterfield FC Community Trust, the Garden is adjacent to the HUB. The Garden is intended as a memorial to fans and former players. It includes a war memorial commemorating the 21 players and officials who died in the wars of the 20th century.

== Notable fixtures ==
The official opening match was a friendly against Derby County on 24 July 2010, during which summer signing Craig Davies scored the first ever goal, in a game that finished in a 5–4 win for Derby.

The first competitive league fixture (Football League Two) was against Barnet on 7 August 2010. Chesterfield won 2–1, with Dwayne Mattis and Jack Lester scoring their goals.

The highest attendance for all games was 10,108 for the National League clash against Maidenhead United on 20 April 2024. The game finished with a 3–2 victory for Chesterfield.

On 8 February 2011 the stadium hosted its first international game when England under-19s played Germany under-19s in a friendly. The game finished with a 1–0 victory for the visiting German side. On 10 September 2012, it hosted England under-21s final 2013 UEFA European Under-21 Championship qualification Group 8 match against Norway's under-21s. The hosts edged out the visitors 1–0 thanks to Connor Wickham's 43rd-minute goal, with 9,947 in attendance.

== See also ==
- Ground improvements to football stadia in England
