= Dudley Wood Stadium =

Former multi-use stadium

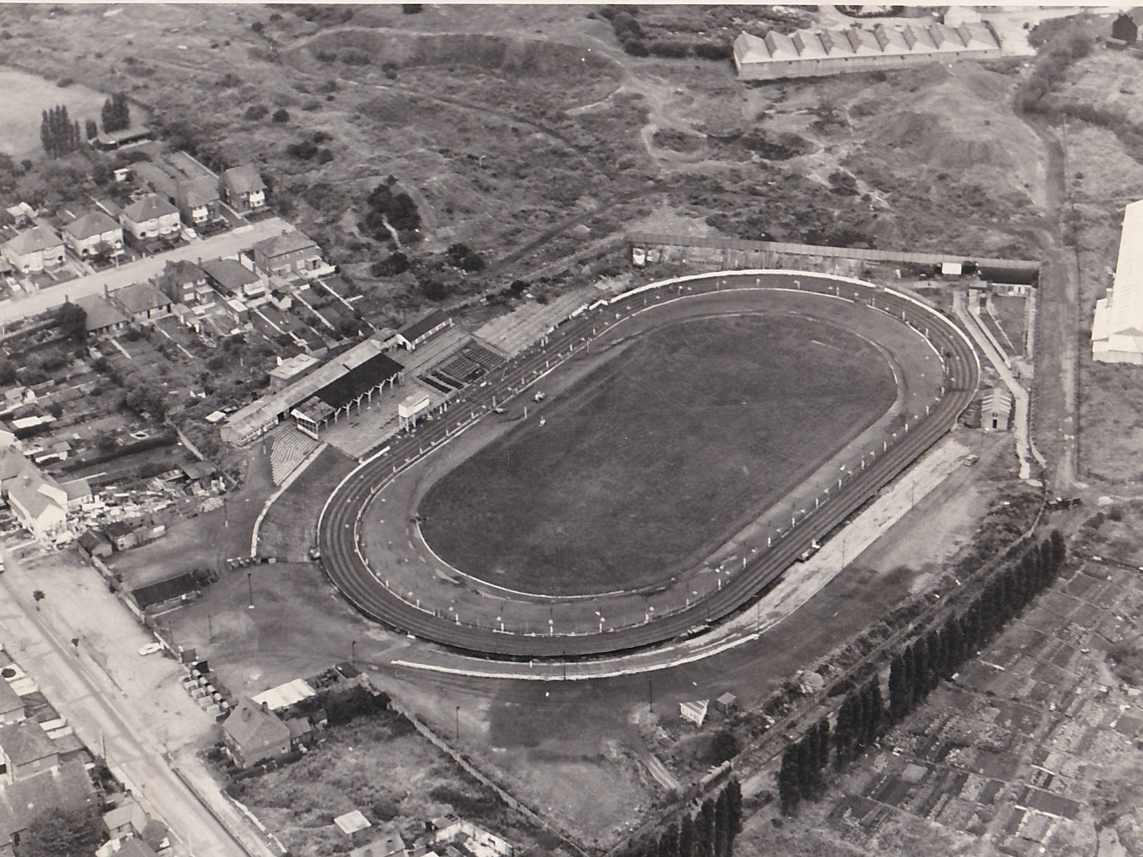
- Circa.1950
- Interactive map of Dudley Wood Stadium
- Location: Dudley Wood Road, Dudley, West Midlands
- Coordinates: 52°28′32″N 2°05′06″W

Construction
- Opened: 1917
- Closed: 1995

Tenants
- Association football (1917–1959); Greyhound racing (1947–1995); Speedway(1947–1995)

Dudley Wood Stadium also known as Cradley Heath Greyhound Stadium was a greyhound racing, speedway and association football stadium.

== Origins ==
The origins of the track date back to 1917 when the Cradley Heath St Lukes Football Club built a new ground during World War I, because the lease at their previous ground at Codsall Park had expired. They found farmland that was suitable for a pitch and constructed a basic football ground and stadium east of the Dudley Wood Road.

== Football ==
Cradley Heath St Lukes were a successful football team playing in front of crowds of 6,000 at their peak. They won the Birmingham and District League three times. The team formed Cradley Sports Enterprise, which also introduced the greyhound racing at the venue.

== Speedway ==
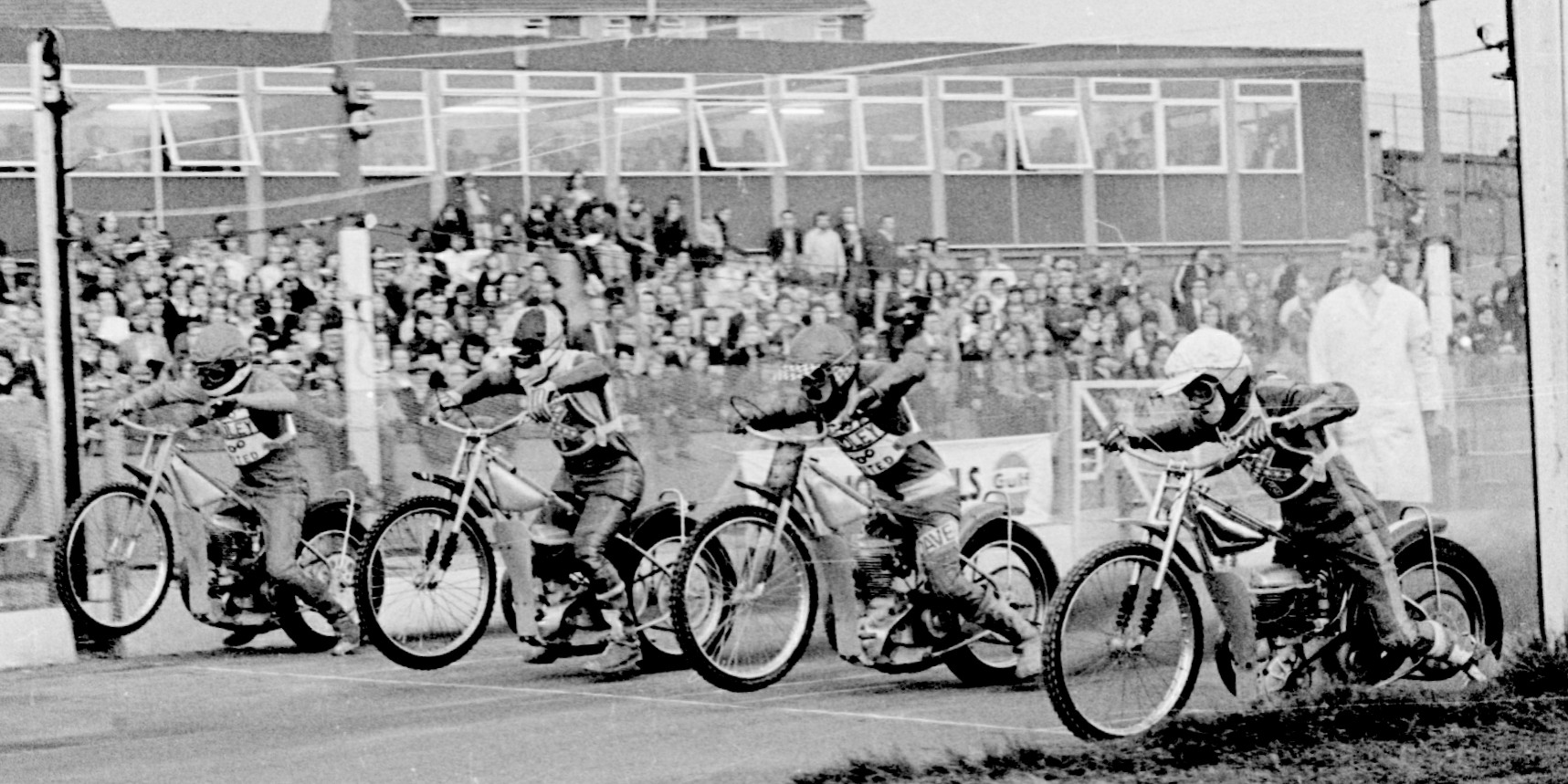
1975 speedway at the stadium

Cradley Heath speedway team first raced at the stadium on 21 June 1947. The third division "Cubs" became the "Heathens" in the National League Division Two in 1949, and raced continuously until 1952. In 1959 the track reopened for one unlicensed meeting and in 1960 the Heathens entered the newly formed Provincial League. The club then operated continuously, at top flight level from 1965, until 1995 when they were evicted by the new landlords who had bought the stadium to redevelop into housing.

The speedway track measured 367 yards (336 m) with a shape and size modelled on the track at Wembley Stadium. The 4-lap track record (clutch start) of 60.7 seconds was set by Hans Nielsen on 18 July 1990.

== Greyhound Racing ==
=== Opening ===
Cradley St Lukes were in debt and after war a betting licence was obtained and Cradley Heath Enterprises started work on the stadium that would include a speedway track. The football club successfully gained permission from Stanley Rous (Football Association) to play on a ground that also held the other sports on the proviso that they did not interfere with the running of the club. So in December 1947 the racing started and the football club decided to sell the ground to the greyhound company for £3,500.

=== History ===
Racing continued throughout the 1950s as an independent track (unaffiliated to a governing body) and the football club moved out in 1959. During this time the track continued to apply to the National Greyhound Racing Club (NGRC) for a full licence without success, the first application had been in 1948 had been refused and subsequent applications had all been refused. Finally in 1966 the track then under the management of Fred Jeffcott received the news that they would be under the NGRC banner by the end of the year. NGRC racing began in September 1966 under the supervision of Racing Manager Lionel Clemmow and a new competition called the Golden Hammer was inaugurated in 1968. The first winner of the event was Shannon Water from Perry Barr. The event was suspended after the 1972 running until 1983 because the track flittered in and out of NGRC status.

Derek Pugh a former Monmore trainer purchased the track and introduced the popular Cradley sales trials during the eighties as the auctioneers Hall, Wateridge and Owen held regular events. The Bridgewater family also had a stake in the company and despite the limitations of the venue there were eight bookmakers, a manual tote and automatic ray timing. Racing was held on Tuesday and Friday nights with trials on Wednesday mornings, the circumference of the circuit was 413 metres with distances of 231, 272, 462 and 647 metres behind an 'Outside McGee' hare.

Pineapple Choice won the 1980 Stow Marathon, Red Prim trained by Jim Barrett claimed the 1981 Eclipse Stakes. Michael and Barbara Compton's Pineapple Barrow reached the 1982 English Greyhound Derby final and won the St Mungo Cup, the Ken Reynolds trained Slender Boy was victorious in the 1983 Northern Flat and the puppy Glenamona lifted the 1983 Trafalgar Cup.

== Closure ==
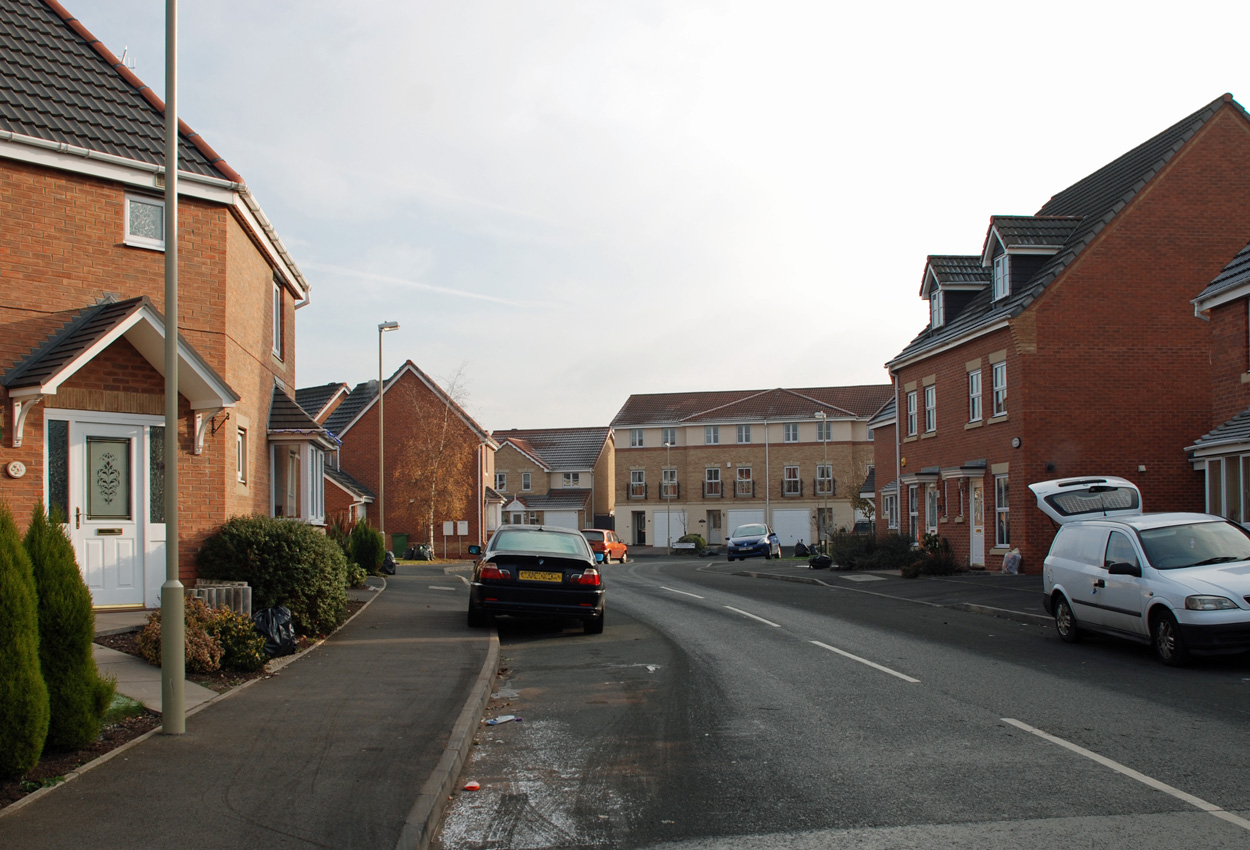
Stadium Drive, facing the area where the stadium previously existed

Cradley Heath closed its doors in 1995 and the stadium was demolished in 1998 by the new owners (Barratt Homes), despite not receiving planning permission for their home development project.

== Golden Hammer winners ==
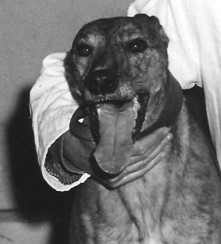
1969 Golden Hammer winner Discretions

Year	Winner	Breeding	Trainer	Time	SP
1968	Shannon Water	Prairie Flash – Shannons Daisy	Denis Delaney (Perry Barr)	27.96	
1969	Discretions	Prairie Flash – Sheila At Last	Wally Ginzel (Private)	28.20	4-11f
1970	Thrushs Song	Forward Flash – Greek Lady	Frank Baldwin (Perry Barr)	28.30	7-4
1971	Big Crash	Spectre II – Kilcox Damsel	Peter Payne (Private)	28.89	
1972	Fleet Fox	Sally's Story - Ticarda	Colin McNally (Perry Barr)	28.90	2-1
1983	Roman Spring	Instant Gambler – Clinker Lassie		28.36	
1990	Linthurst Rita	Buncarrig – Tinys Pet	Leo Pugh (Hall Green)	28.60	13-8f

1968-72 (500y), 1973-82 (not held), 1983-90 (462m)

== Track records ==
Distance	Greyhound	Time	Date
500y	Shannon Water	27.95	05.1968
272m	Tea Punt	15.91	24.07.1981
462m	Slender Boy	28.12	08.11.1983
647m	Ballybeg Grand	40.35	28.09.1977
692m	Ritas Hero	42.40	23.04.1982
875m	Pineapple Choice	55.73	20.07.1982
