= 1964 Irish Greyhound Derby =

- Venue: Shelbourne Park
- Location: Dublin
- End date: 8 August
- Total prize money: £1,500 (winner)

The 1964 Irish Greyhound Derby took place during July and August with the final being held at Shelbourne Park in Dublin on 8 August 1964.

The winner Wonder Valley won £1,500 and was owned and trained by Jack Mullan.

== Final result ==
At Shelbourne, 8 August (over 525 yards):

Position	Winner	Breeding	Trap	SP	Time	Trainer
1st	Wonder Valley	Pigalle Wonder - Racing Millie	3	4-5f	29.30	Jack Mullan
2nd	Granada Chief	The Grand Prince - Mankoya Rose	2	100-8	29.58	Tommy Barrett
3rd	Picture Reply	True Picture - Please Reply	1	3-1	29.61	Tommy Kane
4th	Jet Control	Crazy Parachute - Shrewd Toss	4	33-1		E Stewart
5th	Gleaming There	Hi There - Glittering Gleam	5	9-1		Gay McKenna
6th	Chubby Crackers	The Grand Fire - Patsy's Sister	6	5-1		Mrs M.McGranaghan

=== Distances ===
4½, neck (lengths)

== Competition Report ==
In the first round, Jack Mullan’s 77 pound Wonder Valley recorded an extremely fast 29.47, propelling himself to competition favourite. The dark brindle dog had not performed well in the 1964 English Greyhound Derby going out in the first round but he followed up his first round win with an even faster time of 29.27 in round two.

The Derby looked destined to go to Wonder Valley who was described by some of the press as one of the fastest greyhound's that they had ever seen. The best of the others in round two were Chubby Crackers (29.44), Gleaming There (29.55) and Granada Chief (29.71), Rex Again (29.83) and Bannside King (29.95).

In the semi-finals Wonder Valler missed the break stumbling out of the traps and looked destined to be knocked out but he recovered a ten length deficit to qualify for the final in second place. Chubby Crackers beat Picture Reply and Jet Control beat Granada Chief in the other two semi-finals.

In the final Wonder Valley soon took the lead from Picture Reply by the second bend and his back straight pace pulled him clear as he crossed the line to win in 29.30. Wonder Valley never had the chance to win further competitions because he was retired to stud in the United States.

== See also ==
- 1964 UK & Ireland Greyhound Racing Year
