= 1940 Irish Greyhound Derby =

- Venue: Shelbourne Park
- Location: Dublin
- End date: 5 October
- Total prize money: £225 (winner)

The 1940 Irish Greyhound Derby took place during September and October with the final being held at Shelbourne Park in Dublin on 5 October.

The winner Tanist won £225 and was owned by Arthur Probert of London and bred by Mr W.Twyford (real name Father Browne). Tanist a brindle dog whelped in March 1938 would become one of the fastest trackers in the sport and was one of the foundation sires of modern racing greyhounds.

== Final result ==
At Shelbourne Park, 5 October (over 525 yards):

| Position | Name of Greyhound | Breeding | Trap | SP | Time | Trainer |
|---|---|---|---|---|---|---|
| 1st | Tanist | Inler - Tranquilla | 2 | 4-5f | 29.89 | Billy Quinn (Killenaule) |
| 2nd | Another Dancing Willie | Dasher Lad - Dancing Comet | 5 | 2-1 | 30.37 | |
| 3rd | William the Conqueror | breeding unknown | 4 | 6-1 | 30.40 | |
| unplaced | Prince Norroy | Castledown Lad - Ruddy Mutton | 1 | 10-1 | | |
| unplaced | Fearless Gaughan | breeding unknown | 6 | 100-6 | | |
| unplaced | Cabin Blaze | breeding unknown | 3 | 100-6 | | |

=== Distances ===
6, neck (lengths)

== Competition Report ==
Shelbourne track record holder Tanist returned to Ireland after an unsuccessful spell at Wimbledon Stadium and within a week of his return he set a new national record for 525yds. He was entered for the Derby and was the firm favourite.

Forty of Ireland's leading greyhounds entered the event and the early rounds proved a test for Tanist who found trouble but scraped through to round two where he won in 30.21. Another Dancing Willie won both of his opening rounds and defending champion Marchin' Thro' Georgia made it to the semi-finals.

In the first semi final there was a very strong line up with ended with Tanist coming home first in a time of 29.80; twice Trigo Cup champion Fearless Gaughan finished second and Prince Norroy who would go on to win the Easter Cup the following year denied Marchin' Thro' Georgia a second Derby final appearance by taking third place. In the second semi Another Dancing Willie continued his winning ways by recording 29.94 success.

The expected battle between Tanist and Another Dancing Willie did not materialise because Tanist eased to a six length victory in another very fast time of 29.89. Tanist passed the early leaders Another Dancing Willie and Prince Norroy on the back straight and drew clear.

== See also ==
1940 UK & Ireland Greyhound Racing Year
