= Shawfield Stadium =

Stadium in Glasgow City, Scotland

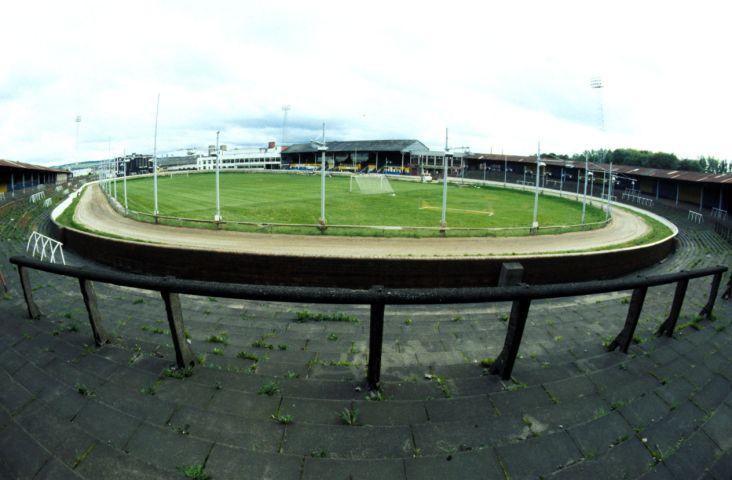
- View from the terracing c.2008

- Location in South Lanarkshire
- Location: Rutherglen, Scotland
- Coordinates: 55°50′18″N 4°13′44″W
- Owner: The late Billy King
- Surface: Grass

Construction
- Opened: 1898
- Closed: 2020

Tenants
- Clyde F.C. (1898–1986); Bridgeton Waverley F.C. (1923–1927); Glasgow Tigers (1988–1995, 1997–1998); Scottish Monarchs (1996)

Shawfield Stadium is an abandoned venue in the Shawfield district of the town of Rutherglen, South Lanarkshire, Scotland, located close to the boundary with Glasgow.

Originally a football ground, Shawfield was home to Clyde F.C. from 1898 to 1986. Greyhound racing was introduced in 1932, and the stadium hosted the Scottish Greyhound Derby from 1970 to 1985 and from 1989 to 2019. The Glasgow Tigers speedway team were also based there, from 1988 to 1995 and 1997 to 1998, with the Scottish Monarchs also racing there in 1996. Other sports including boxing and athletics were also staged at Shawfield.

On 19 March 2020, an announcement was made to suspend racing because of the COVID-19 pandemic. In the following two years the majority of trainers moved their greyhounds to other venues as the track became derelict. During October 2022, the stadium's owner Billy King died, ending the likelihood of it ever reopening.

== Greyhound Racing ==
=== Competitions ===
- Scottish Greyhound Derby
- St Mungo Cup

=== Opening ===
John Bilsland (sole owner of Stanley in Liverpool) helped instigate the plans to open Shawfield in his home town and brought the greyhounds to the home of Clyde F.C. The football club had been based at the stadium since it opened in 1898 but were experiencing financial difficulties by 1930 resulting in the need to find new income streams. The club had tried previously to allow greyhound racing to take place at Shawfield but the Football league was opposed to the idea. Finally an agreement was reached with the chairman John McMahon and the Shawfield Greyhound Racing Company Ltd (SGRC) was born. The track opened on 14 November 1932 in the North Rutherglen area of Glasgow and was a big galloping circuit of 473 yards with 125-yard straights with well banked bends and it became a very popular venue. When Shawfield opened for racing the city of Glasgow already hosted four other National Greyhound Racing Society affiliated tracks in Albion, Carntyne, White City and Firhill. In addition there were the independent tracks of Clydeholm, Coatbridge and Mount Vernon which totalled eight tracks in Glasgow at the time.

The first recorded winner was 'Swordmanship' receiving six yards in a 303-yard handicap race, the time was 18.45 sec. The SGRC bought the stadium from Clyde FC in 1935.

=== History ===
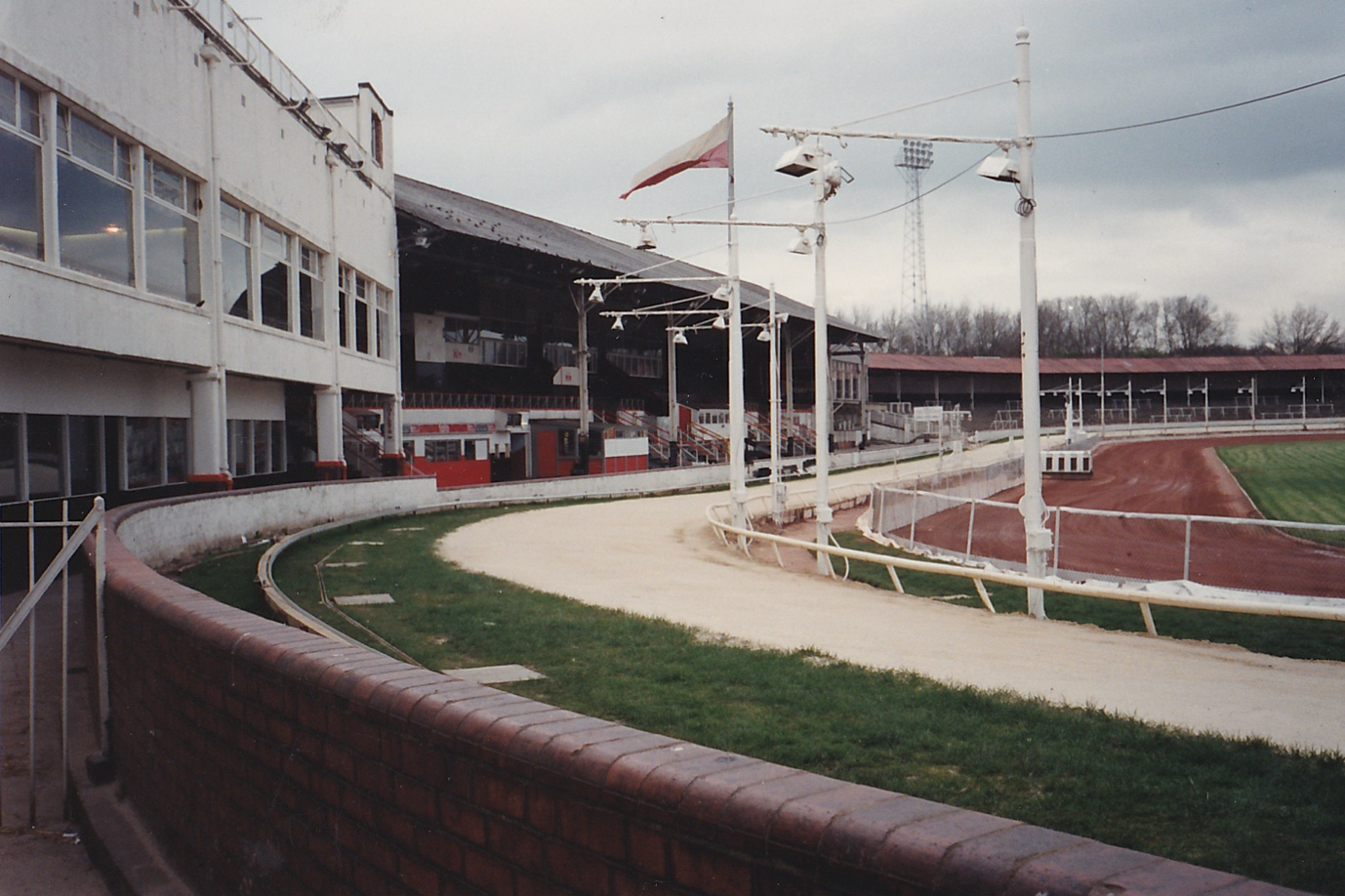
Shawfield Stadium c.1988

After the war had finished the SGRC was valued at £4,000 in 1946 by the taxman but the figure proposed by the owners was only £600 resulting in a dispute. As with most tracks at the time Glasgow experienced a profitable spell during the early fifties but both Albion and Firhill were closed to greyhound racing by the end of the decade. White City had shut by 1962 and in 1968 Carntyne was the latest track to close their doors which had a knock on effect for Shawfield. With the Scottish Greyhound Derby left without a home there were only two tracks big enough to host the event, Powderhall Stadium or Shawfield. The copyright of the Scottish Derby was held by the Greyhound Racing Association (GRA) and they decided that Shawfield could host the 1970 Scottish Derby. Jim Layton was Racing Manager at the time and one year later the track also received another prestigious former Carntyne competition called the St Mungo Cup.

A fire at the track resulted in significant damage to public facilities. To combat this an investment program that included a state of the art totalisator system, ray timing and photo finish equipment was planned and this period also saw the GRA arrive on the scene as they acquired the track under their GRA Property Trust. The track made the National Intertrack final in 1976.

In 1983, the stadium came on the open market and in 1984 the GRA looked to have agreed a deal to sell to Asda bur planning permission was refused. During 1986, Clyde FC were given notice to leave and in May 1986 planning permission for houses was refused. The stadium shut down on 25 October 1986. Supporters of the track campaigned to prevent its closure and, with the help of Billy McAllister, a former bookie, Racing Manager and racing reporter at the track, the Shawfield Action Group was formed. An 8,000 strong petition helped stave planning permission and there was some good news when a business consortium (led by track bookmaker Billy King) bought the track instead of the expected developers. On 11 June 1987 the track re-opened under the Shawfield Greyhound Racing and Leisure Company Ltd. In 1988, the GRA lost their rights to the Scottish Derby following the sale of Powderhall and the Scottish Derby returned to its Glasgow roots. The management which included Robert Lithgow (Racing Manager), had already re-introduced the St Mungo Cup and William King Cup. A £100,000 facelift completed the takeover.

Billy King continued to ply his trade as a bookmaker and in late 2001 the Shawfield Greyhound Racing and Leisure Company Ltd became the Shawfield Greyhound Stadium Ltd. The large tote board which dominated the south end of the track was demolished in 2004.

== Demise and closure ==
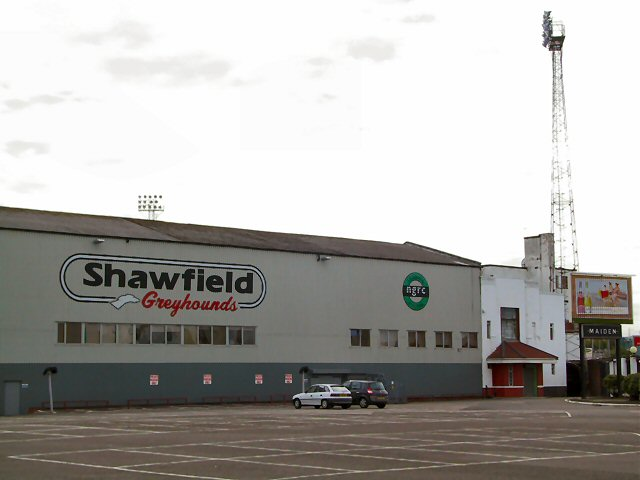
Exterior in 2005

It was the last remaining licensed track in Scotland until its closure in 2020. The venue then remained unused for two years following the COVID-19 pandemic. In October 2022 the owner Billy King died of a suspected heart attack. Following his death, no further plans to reopen the stadium were announced. It had previously been reported that the owners were considering redevelopment of the site for housing, pending the results of an environmental report investigating potential land contamination.

In July 2023, a request was submitted to Historic Environment Scotland to have the site assessed as a potential listed building due to its significance. In October of that year, regeneration plans were unveiled for the redevelopment of the site, involving the demolition of the stadium and its replacement with a mixed use development including housing and retail. In April 2024, the historical assessment returned a verdict not to designate the stadium, although it met the criteria for Category B listing, "because the site is subject of advanced development proposals". Greyhound racing was formally banned in Scotland in March 2026.

=== Track records ===
Extended content

At closing

Metres	Greyhound	Time	Date	Notes
300	Ravage Again	17.35	7 April 1990	
480	Droopys Buick	28.63	2 April 2016	Scottish Greyhound Derby semi final
500	Droopys Sandy	29.39	21 May 1994	Scottish Greyhound Derby Final
500 hurdles	Face The Mutt	31.07	25 May 1982	
670	Crack of the Ash	40.50	11 September 1993	
730	Decoy Princess	45.09	20 February 1988	
882	Rosemoor Flower	56.55	13 April 2002	
932	Silken Dancer	59.35	2 September 1993	

Former (Pre metric)

Yards	Greyhound	Time (sec)	Date	Notes
300	Montforte Louis	16.45	30 July 1965	
300	Bright Lad	16.60	27.05.1970	
303	S M Rob Roy		c.1950	
303	Special Intention	16.43	5 July 1950	
500	Clane Flirt	27.88	06.08.1945	
550	Rushton Smutty	27.60	16.07.1951	
525	Fin Machree	29.07	21.07.1947	
525	Biddys Fire	28.75	27.07.1964	
535	Killone Flash	29.63	10.05.1971	
700	Mad Midnight	39.88	1946	World Record
700	Our Tansy	39.53	12.07.1947	
500 H	Minorcas Glass	28.75	18.05.1956	
525 H	Morganstown View	30.30	08.08.1958	

Former (Post metric)

Extended content

Metres	Greyhound	Time	Date	Notes
300	Fearless Prince	17.97	1987	
300	Movealong Inler	17.94	20.02.1988	
300	Ravage Again	17.41	27.10.1989	
450	Fair Hill Boy	26.85	27.10.1989	
480	Comrades Delight	29.56	21.12.1991	
480	Funny Enough	29.32	10.09.1994	
480	Solar Symphony	28.97	20.05.1995	Scottish Greyhound Derby Final
480	Justright Melody	28.87	08.08.1995	
480	Farloe Verdict	28.79	03.04.2004	Scottish Greyhound Derby Final
480	Fear Haribo	28.76	14.04.2007	Scottish Greyhound Derby Final
480	Tyrur Kieran	28.69	09.04.2008	Scottish Greyhound Derby semi final
480	Greenwell River	28.66	11.04.2009	Scottish Derby invitation
500	Special Account		10.08.1982	Scottish Greyhound Derby semi final
500	Special Account	29.99	14.08.1982	Scottish Greyhound Derby Final
500	Westmead Harry	29.62	19.05.1990	Scottish Greyhound Derby Final
510 hurdles	Lovely Pud	31.63	09.07.1984	
670	Prince Peacock	41.53	11.08.1984	
670	Wellimoff	41.08	1988	
670	Chicita Banana	40.83	07.04.1989	
725	Woopsy	45.91	1987	
882	Omega Jet	56.63	18.04.1998	
882	Lucky Mollie	56.55	13.04.2002	
882	My Tootsie	60.44	1987	
932	Denes Mutt	59.68	08.09.1987	
932	Swiss Trips	59.54	05.09.1991	

== Football ==
=== Clyde F.C. ===
Clyde F.C. took over the site, previously a trotting track, in 1898, having previously been based across the River Clyde at Barrowfield Park. The club earned additional revenue from using Shawfield for boxing and Track and field; greyhound racing was introduced in 1932. Clyde's financial difficulties led to the sale of Shawfield to the Shawfield Greyhound Racing Company Ltd in 1935, but the club continued to play there as tenants. They invited emerging Junior team Bridgeton Waverley to play there temporarily in the 1920s. During the Second World War, Clyde almost had to leave Shawfield because the owners demanded the use of the stadium on Saturday afternoons. Eventually a compromise was reached where the stadium would be used for dog racing on alternate Saturday afternoons, which enabled Clyde to continue hosting home fixtures despite logistical challenges.

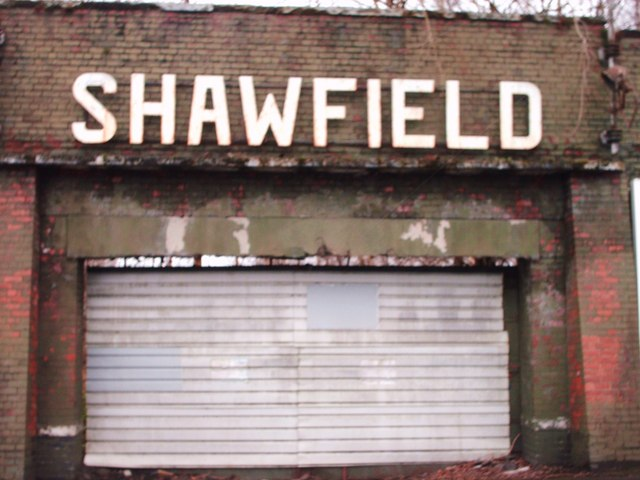
Old entrance gate at Shawfield in 2008

After World War II, Clyde and the other smaller clubs in the Glasgow area struggled to compete with the dominant Old Firm. In addition to this, many of the heavily populated tenements surrounding Shawfield (Oatlands, Hutchesontown, Dalmarnock, Bridgeton and central Rutherglen districts) had been cleared in the 1960s, reducing Clyde's support base. The club proposed to move to the new town of East Kilbride in 1966. Four years later, Clyde attempted to take over Hamilton Academical; this collapsed when four of the Hamilton directors secured a lease on Douglas Park. Clyde continued to play at Shawfield until 1986, when the GRA's redevelopment plans led to Clyde's eviction. Following the collapse of the redevelopment plans, Clyde did not return to the ground, although this was proposed in 1988. After a period of uncertainty playing at Firhill in the north of Glasgow (home of rivals Partick Thistle) and then later at Hamilton, Clyde eventually accepted an offer from the town of Cumbernauld to move to what became Broadwood Stadium.

=== 1957 disaster ===
On 14 December 1957, a disaster occurred at the stadium during a Scottish Football League match between Clyde and Celtic. A very large crowd of 27,000 had been allowed into the stadium to see the fixture (involving the team which had just won the League Cup and the team which would go on to lift the Scottish Cup at the end of the season), with reports of the time describing Shawfield as "bursting at the seams"; crushing was experienced among some of the spectators prior to kick-off. At the time this issue was a fairly common occurrence at popular events, and it was also normal for children in the crowd to be passed over the heads of the adults out of the terracing. In this instance the juveniles were passed over the 4-foot (1.2 m) high terracing boundary wall onto the greyhound track and sat on the track to watch the match, with their backs to the wall.

In the opening minutes a goal by Celtic resulted in a surge forward among the packed crowd, and a section of the boundary wall collapsed forward under the strain, falling onto the boys sitting on its opposite side. Players stopped to help the injured, whilst supporters at the other end of the ground were unaware of any incident due to the smog which enveloped the stadium, and initially shouted for the game to be restarted. The match did resume following a 20-minute delay to rescue trapped boys and carry away the injured for treatment, despite some of the players being visibly distressed by what they had witnessed. Celtic eventually won a contest played at particularly high intensity by a 6–3 scoreline.

A total of 50 persons were injured, almost all of them children, with 13 detained in hospital suffering serious injuries and one fatality among them: a nine-year-old boy named James Ryan from Bridgeton whose chest was crushed.

During the fatal accident inquiry the following February his uncle stated that James had been lifted over the wall onto the track only seconds before it collapsed, and other boys who were injured also stated that they had still been in the stand at the time the goal was scored and had jumped over the wall to avoid being crushed just prior to it falling. The inquiry heard evidence that the wall had been inspected following the incident and was of sound and legal construction, and it was only the extreme force that caused it to collapse. The accident was blamed on unruly persons in the crowd who had repeatedly been rushing forward irresponsibly, and on the absence of any crush barriers in that area of the terracing which would have lessened the forward pressure exerted. The police also stated that they had not formally agreed for any persons to be on the track at the time (although it was permitted in exceptional circumstances), and even larger attendances had previously been recorded at Shawfield for fixtures against Celtic and Rangers.

=== Notable matches ===
The stadium hosted four Scottish Football League XI representative matches: in 1911 versus the Southern League, 1921 versus the Irish League XI, and 1954 and 1956 versus the League of Ireland XI; the Scottish side won all four matches.

The venue also hosted the annual Glasgow vs Sheffield Inter-City match in 1901, 1954, and 1956. Both Harry Haddock and Tommy Ring played in the two latter matches, with Ring scoring in both.

The ground hosted various representative matches, including the benefit match for the Players Union between a Scottish XI and English XI in 1914, the Scotland XI vs British Army international trial, the Scotland under-23 against Auld Enemy and then tenants Clyde, A Scotland Junior XI vs Scotland 2nd XI was played in 1961.

It also hosted three Scottish Junior Cup Finals, in 1909, 1942 and 1943 (two of these went to a replay, held elsewhere). It annually hosted the (Evening Times Trophy) Central Junior League Final between 1944 and 1964. Additionally, it held the 1953 Central League Cup final, with Ashfield beating 2–1 Kilsyth Rangers.

Rutherglen Ladies, one of the leading women's association football teams in Britain in the 1920s and 30s (when they were officially banned from participating in the sport) played several exhibition matches at Shawfield.

== Speedway ==
The Glasgow Tigers returned to their home city in 1988 after racing in Workington for one season. The Tigers raced there for a decade, apart from the 1996 season when they were temporarily in abeyance and replaced by the ill-fated Scottish Monarchs who had a team but no track due to the closure of Powderhall. When the venue opened, the racing could be viewed from two straights and the third and fourth bends but over the years the viewing area was reduced to a small part of the stadium in front of the stand. They departed to Ashfield Stadium ahead of the 1999 season.

== Other sports ==
Benny Lynch, the first Scottish boxing world champion, had his first title defence and the first world championship match held in Scotland at Shawfield on October 13, 1937. Lynch retained his flyweight title after defeating Peter Kane in front of 40,000 spectators.

== Location anomalies ==
- Historically, the boundary between the county and city of Glasgow and the county of Lanarkshire passed right through Shawfield. During World War II, when the gathering of crowds in areas deemed "unsafe" were severely restricted, this meant Shawfield was allowed to accommodate 20,000 spectators, whereas Celtic Park, less than a mile away but wholly located in Glasgow was permitted only 10,000 people in a much larger venue.
- In the 1966–67 season, Clyde's third-placed finish in the Scottish League should have earned them a place in the Inter-Cities Fairs Cup, however a one club per city rule applied to the competition, and second placed Rangers had precedence to represent Glasgow. Clyde attempted to argue that Shawfield's location actually meant they were from the separate town of Rutherglen, however the organisers of the tournament cited Clyde's membership of the Glasgow Football Association and participation in the Glasgow Cup.
- Local government reorganisation in 1975 meant that Rutherglen, and Shawfield with it, was now incorporated entirely into an expanded Glasgow district within Strathclyde region. Further changes in 1996 created the new unitary authority area of South Lanarkshire, with Shawfield now lying entirely within this area and no longer even partially in Glasgow.

== Gallery ==
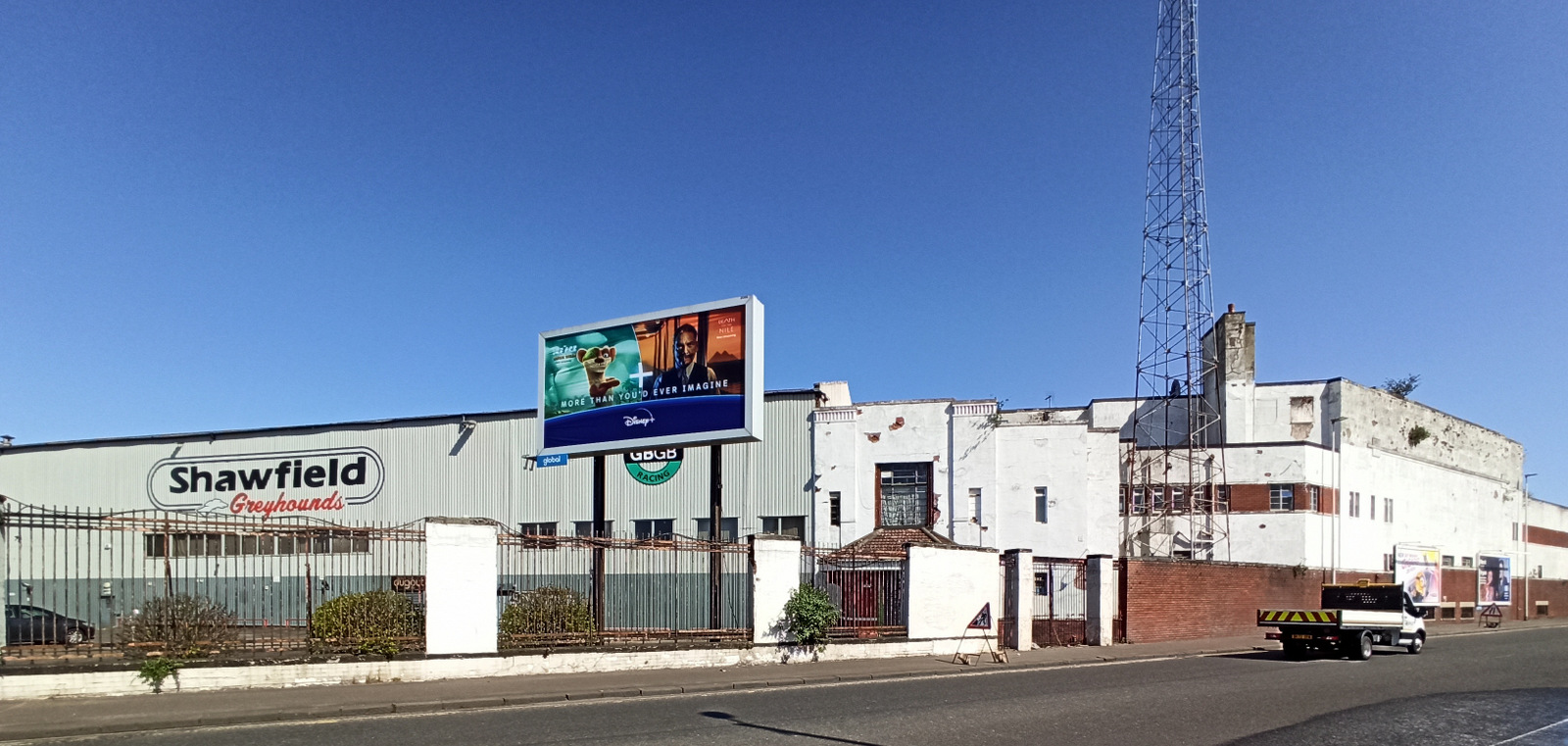
The stadium in April 2022

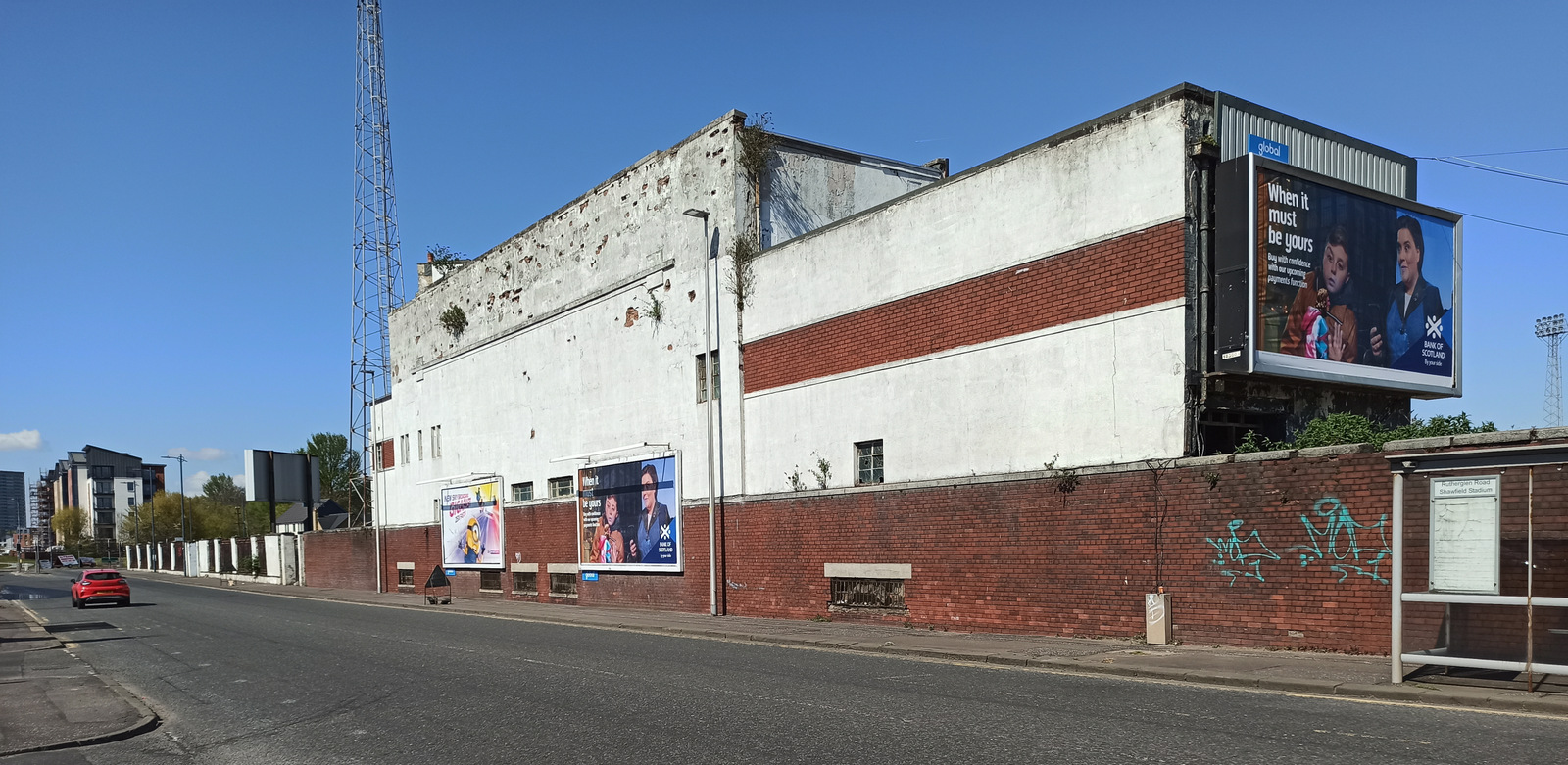
The Rutherglen Road side of the stadium in April 2022

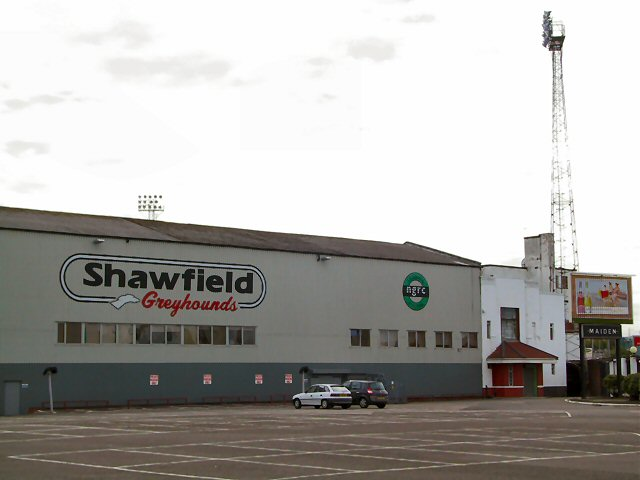
The stadium in April 2022

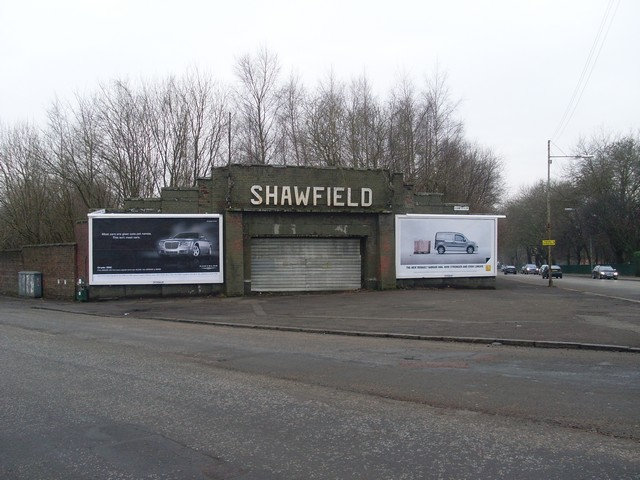
Old entrance at the north of the stadium in 2009

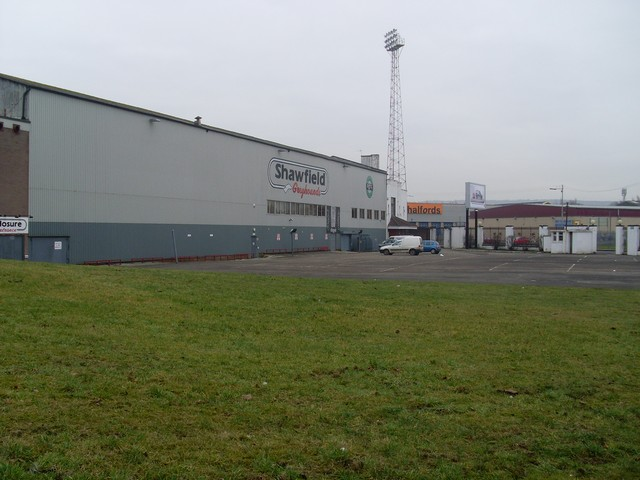
The stadium in 2009

== See also ==
- Stadium relocations in Scottish football
