= 1964 English Greyhound Derby =

- Venue: White City Stadium
- Location: White City, London
- Start date: 13 June
- End date: 27 June
- Total prize money: £3,000 (winner)

The 1964 Greyhound Derby took place during June with the final being held on 27 June 1964 at White City Stadium. The winner was Hack up Chieftain and the winning owner Mr S Donohue received £3,000. He was bred by Leslie McNair.

== Final result ==
At White City (over 525 yards):

Position	Name of Greyhound	Breeding	Trap	SP	Time	Trainer
1st	Hack up Chieftain	Knock Hill Chieftain - Bunclody Queen	1	20-1	28.92	Percy Stagg (Belle Vue)
2nd	Die Cast	Crazy Parachute - Brennans Girl	2	2-1f	29.04	Jimmy Rimmer (Wembley)
3rd	Rupuninni	Knock Hill Chieftain - Lovely Sister	5	3-1	29.26	Jim Irving (Private)
4th	We'll See	Knock Hill Chieftain - Bunnykins	4	9-4	29.38	Joe Pickering (White City - London)
5th	Crazy Platinum	Crazy Parachute - Bridgetown Girl	6	8-1	29.42	Bessie Lewis (Private)
6th	Scamp Boy	Keep Moving - Flying Fanny	3	5-1	29.56	Bessie Lewis (Private)

=== Distances ===
1¾, 3, 1¾, 1¾, 2 (lengths)
The distances between the greyhounds are in finishing order and shown in lengths. From 1950 one length was equal to 0.08 of one second.

== Competition report ==
The best bitch in the country Cranog Bet was one of the market leaders when the ante-post lists were compiled; the Phil Rees trained January 1962 whelp was aiming to become just the third bitch in history to win the Derby. Leading Midlands trainer Joe De Mulder sent a strong team headed by Cahara Rover the Pall Mall Stakes, Birmingham Cup and Stewards Cup champion. Scottish Greyhound Derby winner 'We’ll See' now in the hands of Joe Pickering was also considered a leading entry. The betting was Cahara Rover 14-1, Lucky Wonder, Fairy Chum, Fleadh Music, Cranog Bet all 20-1.

Cranog Bet was eliminated during the first round continuing the trend of ante-post favourites failing to pass the first stage. One of the main Irish entries called Wonder Valley also failed to make it past round one, he had exceptional pace but his large size meant that he tended to encounter trouble. Cahara Rover and We’ll See safely progressed to round two.

The second round saw Scamp Boy and Jerpoint Prince oblige as favourites and the well supported Rupunnini and Die Cast claimed the other two heats. The semi-finals were disappointing because the greyhounds encountered so much trouble. The first semi left 20-1 chance Crazy Platinum in front after missing first bend trouble, he held off Die Cast and Rupuninni, both of whom had recovered well to make the final. The second semi was won in 29.77 slower than some of the graded* races and Cahara Rover and Jerpoint Prince were both knocked over. We’ll See finished first with Scamp Boy and Hack It Chieftain taking the minor places.

The final had three runners connected to Scotland and three from England. Bessie Lewis had travelled from near Mount Vernon in Glasgow and We’ll See was owned by Scotsman Harry Louden. The newspapers picked up on the fact and announced that it was the England versus Scotland final. The final was seen as being wide open with Die Cast starting 2-1 favourite. First to break was Crazy Platinum followed by We’ll See but both bumped each other at the first bend effectively ending the chances of the pair. Hack Up Chieftain went through a gap that appeared and took full advantage by going on to win the race at odds of 20-1, the first time the rank outsider in the final had claimed the crown. Die Cast finished well to take second place.

Graded races* (Races for slightly slower greyhounds, graded on ability on a number scale, usually from 1-9.)

== See also ==
- 1964 UK & Ireland Greyhound Racing Year
