= Birmingham Cup =

British greyhound racing competition

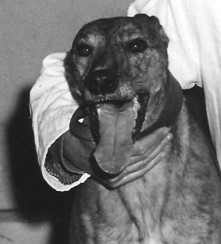
- 1968 winner Discretions
- Class: Category 1
- Location: Nottingham
- Inaugurated: 1939
- Sponsor: Arena Racing Company

Race information
- Distance: 480 metres
- Surface: Sand
- Purse: £12,500 (winner)

The Birmingham Cup is a greyhound racing competition inaugurated in 1939 and currently held at Nottingham Greyhound Stadium.

== History ==
The event began life as a handicap kennel sweepstake in 1938 but the following year was inaugurated as an open race competition being held annually at the Old Perry Barr Greyhound Stadium, until the closure of the track in 1984. The competition was one of the leading events in the Midlands and was brought back in 1992 at the new Perry Barr Stadium, until the decision was made to discontinue the event in 2009.

The event was held over the standard distance (the most common distance held at a track) and winners included the 1946 English Greyhound Derby champion Mondays News.

In 2020, the competition was brought back in memory of Michael Lambe Senior and in 2023 was upgraded to category one with a winner's prize of £12,500. With the closure of Perry Barr in 2025 the event moved to Nottingham.

== Venues and distances ==
- 1939–1979 (Perry Barr, Walsall Road, 525y)
- 1992–1997 (Perry Barr, Aldridge Road, 500m)
- 1998–2024 (Perry Barr, Aldridge Road, 480m)
- 2025–2025 (Nottingham, 480m)

== Sponsors ==
- 1992–1998 (Ansells Brewery)
- 2003–2007 (Tony Campbell On Course)
- 2008–2008 (Stan James Bookmakers)
- 2009–2009 (William Hill)
- 2020–2024 (M Lambe Construction)
- 2025–2025 (Arena Racing Company)

== Past winners ==
Year	Winner	Breeding	Trainer	Time (sec)	SP	Notes/ref
1939	Black Johnny	Johnny Peters - Toftwood Magnet	Stan Raymond (Gloucester)	29.76	4/1	track record
1940	S.M. Hector	Bella's Brother - Acid Fast	Ernest Fryer (Coventry)	30.05	8/1	
1941 to 1942 not held
1943	Farloe Best		Mrs Renie McKay (Coventry)	29.68	7/2	
1944	Model Dasher	Model Whiskey - Dashing Comet	Tom Baldwin (Perry Barr)	29.80	n/a	Re-run (no betting)
1945	Duffys Arrival	Shamrock Prince - Moon Bridge	George McKay (Coventry)	30.14	6/4f	
1946	Mondays News	Orluck's Best - Monday Next	Fred Farey (Private)	30.35	4/6f	
1947	Funny Mick	Ruby Border - Olive's Idol	Bob Burls (Wembley)	30.09	100/30	
1948	Baytown Stork	Baytown Tulip - Ulster Row	Jack Toseland (Perry Barr)	30.34	6/1	
1949	Kilcaskin Mail	Train - Tinker's Hill	Les Brown (Wolverhampton)	30.52	10/1	
1952	Rushton Smutty	Mad Tanist - Summer Frock	Frank Johnson (Private)	29.80	1/2f	
1953	Fly Prince	Bellas Prince – Lough Baby	W E Hughes (Private)	29.85	3/1	
1954	Galtee Cleo	Sandown Champion – Cleopatra	Jack Harvey (Wembley)	29.74	1/1f	
1955	Rushton Spot	Rushton News – Rushton Panda	Frank Johnson (Private)	29.85	1/2f	
1956	Hopalong Pal	Ollys Pal – Hopalong Dante	Joe Booth (Private)	30.26	11/8jf	
1957	Silent Worship	The Grand Champion-Miss Chancer	John Bassett (Wolverhampton)	29.72	7/4f	
1958	Dancing Sheik	Imperial Dancer – Delias Green	Ted Brennan (Owlerton)	29.49	4/7f	
1959	Fearless Mac	Ballymac Ball – Dare Me Now	Joe De Mulder (Private)	29.72	4/6f	
1960	Jungle Man	Man of Pleasure – Seafield Biddy	Harry Tasker (Private)	29.95	5/2	
1961	Desert Rambler	Champion Prince – Imperial Peg	Joe Booth (Private)	29.76	4/7f	
1962	Dromin Glory	Hi There - Dromin Jet	John Bassett (Clapton)	29.19	1/2f	
1963	Cahara Rover	Paddle First – Cahara Lass	Joe De Mulder (Private)	29.78	7/2	
1964	Scamp Boy	Keep Moving – Flying Fantasy	Bessie Lewis (Private)	30.55	4/1	
1965	Arthur's Jet	Odd Venture – Arthurs Shoe	John Bassett (Clapton)	29.61	6/1	
1966	Corville Gallant	Odd Venture - Irish Isle	Jimmy Quinn (Perry Barr)	29.65	4/1	
1967	Limits Crackers	Odd Venture - Pats Regret	Colin McNally (Perry Barr)	29.48	3/1	
1968	Discretions	Prairie Flash - Sheila at Last	David Geggus (Walthamstow)	29.67	3/1	
1971	Jellico Mist	Clomoney Jet - Ivy Millie	Norman Oliver (Brough Park)	29.79	7/4jf	
1972	Cowboy Jo	Dusty Trail - Roamin Beauty	Mick Hawkins (Private)	29.57	4/6f	
1973	Mel's Pupil	Monalee King - Ella's Rocket	John Bassett (Perry Barr)	29.23	7/1	
1977	Blackwater Glade	Quiet Spring - Husky Silver	Brian Jay (Perry Barr)	29.79	5/1	
1978	Tails	Jimsun - Wall Tie	Frank Baldwin (Perry Barr)	29.48	5/4f	
1979	Mohane	Pacific Treasure - Tricias Arrow	Frank Baldwin (Perry Barr)	31.13	2/1f	
1992	Ballyard Curtis	I'm Slippy – Ballyard Murlen	Geoff De Mulder (Private)	30.37	14/1	
1993	Winsor Vic	Dukes Lodge - Winsor Aird	John McGee Sr. (Reading)	30.94	2/1f	
1994	Heres Seanie	Ardfert Sean - Mindys Miracle	Pat Ryan (Perry Barr)	30.13	6/4f	
1995	Courier Kid	Manx Treasure – Strange Manner	John Coleman (Walthamstow)	30.37	5/1	
1996	Longvalley Rebel	Right Move – Long Valley Lady	John Coleman (Walthamstow)	30.33	7/4	
1997	Saradeb	Slaneyside Hare – Genotin Laura	Jimmy Gibson (Belle Vue)	30.30	9/2	
1998	Honour And Glory	Murlens Slippy – Satharn Lady	John Coleman (Walthamstow)	29.17	3/1	
1999	Derbay Flyer	Ayr Flyer – Brown Missile	Charlie Lister OBE (Private)	29.06	4/6f	
2003	Farloe Hack	Staplers Jo – Farloe Dingle	Barrie Draper (Sheffield)	28.50	9/4	
2005	Canimar	Top Honcho – All Grit	Charlie Lister OBE (Private)	28.67	3/1	
2006	Kingsmill Again	Roanokee – Mitzys Dream	Andy Johnson (Private)	28.68	7/1	
2007	Zigzag Dutchman	Dutchys Angel – ZigZag Bullett	Charlie Lister OBE (Private)	28.13	4/1	
2008	Ballymac Under	Ballymac Maeve – Ballymac Lark	Matt Dartnall (Private)	28.25	4/5f	
2009	Fear Zafonic	Premier Fantasy – Farloe Oyster	Charlie Lister OBE (Private)	28.44	4/5f	
2010 to 2019 not held
2020	Droopys Carat	Azza Azza Azza – Droopys Dorothy	Angela Harrison (Newcastle)	28.74	8/1	
2021	Candy Man	Holdem Spy – Wont Fall Behind	Carol Weatherall (Sheffield)	28.10	5/1	
2022	Ivanexile	Laughil Blake – Trusted Exile	Matt Dartnall (Oxford)	28.16	7/4	
2023	Brookside Richie	Droopys Sydney – Droopys Greatest	James Fenwick (Newcastle)	28.27	7/2	
2024	Rioja Bungle	Ballymac Bolger – Bull Run Byte	Kevin Hutton (Oxford)	28.22	9/2	
2025	Chelms Bear	Droopys Sydney – Barntick Smokey	Craig Morris (Yarmouth)	28.14	10/11f	
