= Hawick Target Hill Greyhound Track =

Former racing track in Hawick, Scotland

- Interactive map of Hawick Target Hill Greyhound Track
- Location: Hawick, Scottish Borders
- Coordinates: 55°25′14″N 2°46′26″W

Construction
- Opened: 1939
- Closed: 1967

Hawick Target Hill Greyhound Track was a former greyhound racing track in Hawick in the Scottish Borders, between Mosshills Loch and Braid Road, south east of Hawick. The track opened in 1939 adjacent to Target Field after some form of early greyhound racing existed at nearby Millers Knowes. The name 'Target' derives from Boozieburn Rifle Range. It was a small independent (unlicensed) track and closed in 1967 and became private kennels.
