= 1939 English Greyhound Derby =

- Location: White City Stadium
- Start date: 10 June
- End date: 24 June
- Total prize money: £1,250 (winner)

The 1939 Greyhound Derby took place during June with the final being held on 24 June 1939 at White City Stadium. The winner Highland Rum received a first prize of £1,250. The attendance was 92,000 and the totalisator turnover for the final was £14,341 and for the meeting it was £114,780 which set a new record for a greyhound meeting. Using historic inflation (2019) this equates to £7.5 million.

== Final result ==
At White City (over 525 yards):

Position	Name of Greyhound	Breeding	Trap	SP	Time	Trainer
1st	Highland Rum	Rum Ration - Liagh Lady	6	2-1jf	29.35	Paddy Fortune (Wimbledon)
2nd	Carmel Ash	Tallboy - Carmel Jean	2	2-1jf	29.55	Eddie Wright (Harringay)
3rd	Demotic Mack	Beef Cutlet - Kaiti Hill	3	10-1	30.51	Charles Cross (Clapton)
4th	Mister Mutt	Final Fight - Captains Fancy	5	100-8	30.53	Albert Stocker (Private)
5th	Junior Classic	Beef Cutlet - Lady Eleanor	1	5-2	30.61	Joe Harmon (Wimbledon)
N/R	Black Peter	Johnny Peters - Toftwood Magnet	4			Stan Raymond (Gloucester)

=== Distances ===
2½, 12, head, 1 (lengths)
The distances between the greyhounds are in finishing order and shown in lengths. From 1927-1950 one length was equal to 0.06 of one second but race times are shown as 0.08 as per modern day calculations.

== Review ==
Junior Classic was expected to be a serious contender for the 1939 Derby; he had won the Catford and Stamford Bridge Produce Stakes and the Puppy Derby in 1937, before winning the 1938 Gold Collar but had suffered a five month layoff after breaking a toe. Other major contenders were seen as Gretas Rosary, the St Leger champion and Demotic Mack.

The eight first round heats were held on 10 June and Gretas Rosary, Roe Side Scottie and Glen Ranger were surprise eliminations.

In the quarter-finals, held five days later, Carmel Ash and Demotic Mack were in good form as they both progressed unbeaten. Gayhunter trained by Harry Buck and Junior Classic accounted for the other two quarters, both making amends for first round defeats. Irish Derby champion Abbeylara, now trained by Leslie Reynolds went out at this stage.

The semi-finals provided wins for Carmel Ash (4-5f) and Junior Classic (9-4); Carmel Ash had won every round to qualify for the final and Highland Rum, owned by Irishman J Harty (a rate collector), progressed through in unspectacular fashion managing just one first round win and Mister Mutt qualified for the final by virtue of taking the final spot in every round.

Black Peter trained by Stan Raymond was withdrawn from the final following an injury sustained during training, this was the only time Gloucester would ever have a finalist. A record 92,000 attended and the tote turnover set new records of £14,341 for a single race and £114,780 for a meeting. As the traps rose, the outsider Mister Mutt took the lead. Bad crowding resulted as the field reached the first bend together and wide runner Highland Rum took advantage building a five length lead from Carmel Ash. Highland Rum won the race, with Carmel Ash running on well for second place with Demotic Mack a further 12 lengths behind in third place.

== See also ==
- 1939 UK & Ireland Greyhound Racing Year
