= 1940 UK & Ireland Greyhound Racing Year =

The 1940 UK & Ireland Greyhound Racing Year was the 15th year of greyhound racing in the United Kingdom and the 14th year of greyhound racing in Ireland.

== Roll of honour ==
Major Winners
Award	Name of Winner
1940 English Greyhound Derby	G.R.Archduke
1940 Irish Greyhound Derby	Tanist
1940 Scottish Greyhound Derby	Ballycurren Soldier

== Summary ==
The government were reportedly on the verge of calling a ban on racing and tracks that remained open were beset with problems with many of their staff being called up to fight in the war. Staff called up included trainers and the likes of Wilf Taylor and Albert Jonas were just two such cases.

In addition many of the greyhound owners were unable to pay the kennel fees to their respective trainers for the same reason. The Greyhound Express even ran an article about their own dwindling staff at the newspaper. The anti–betting lobby led by the Labour Party wanted a total ban to racing, quoting that the public transport was being used by racegoers and as a result munitions factory workers were having to walk home. The nation was divided in regards to allowing racing to continue.

Despite the problems the industry continued to record remarkable results, in terms of attendances and totalisator turnover. The leading greyhound company, the Greyhound Racing Association (GRA) saw reduced profits as expected but still made a net profit of £74,988. The figure was made all the more surprising because from 24 June until 31 December the company had only staged 23 meetings across its race tracks. GRA attendances for the year dropped but remained healthy at 2,516,816.

After receiving instruction from the government, all tracks were ordered by the sports administrative body (the National Greyhound Racing Society) to reduce racing to one meeting per week.

G.R.Archduke won the 1940 English Greyhound Derby, which became known as the 'Silent Derby' due to the fact that it started at White City but ended at Harringay Stadium, after White City closed for the rest if the war.

== Tracks ==
Sunderland Greyhound Stadium held its inaugural race meeting on 23 March and Yarmouth Stadium opened on 11 May but would close soon after. The Brighton & Hove Greyhound Stadium kennels moved from on site to Albourne.

Reading Stadium appointed former Reading F.C. goalkeeper Percy Whittaker as a trainer.

=== Tracks opened ===
Date	Stadium/Track	Location
23 March	Sunderland Greyhound Stadium	Sunderland
1 April	Mains Park	Linlithgow
11 May	Yarmouth Stadium	Yarmouth

== Competitions ==
Many of the major competitions were postponed until 1945, classic races the Scurry Gold Cup, Cesarewitch and St Leger were some of the biggest casualties. The Joe Harmon trained brindle, Juvenile Classic, completed a second successful campaign in the Grand National. He had finished runner up the previous year and had won it during 1938. The Gold Collar followed the Grand National as usual and the Wembley trained Cash Balance stopped Grosvenor Ferdinand, now trained by Jack Harvey, from becoming the first greyhound to defend the title successfully.

The Scottish Greyhound Derby in July, was won by local greyhound Ballycurreen Soldier, who would justify favouritism as he defeated Grosvenor Ferdinand, Junior Classic and defending champion Misty Law II. In the Laurels, Derby finalists Rock Callan and Keel Creamery failed to overcome April Burglar.

== News ==
Regular fund raising for the war effort from the greyhound racing public raised significant amounts throughout the year.

== Ireland ==
In Ireland the 1940 Irish Greyhound Derby would not take place until October and a superstar would emerge, without fully being recognised during his racing career. Tanist was a brindle dog whelped in March 1938 by Inler out of the dam Tranquilia and would later become arguably the most significant breeding sire in Irish history. Owned Mr W.Twyford (real name Father F.Browne) and trained by Billy Quinn he reached the final of the Easter Cup at Shelbourne Park, won by Shy Sandy in April and broke the track record, recording 29.66 seconds and was also the first to break 30 seconds barrier at Clonmel Greyhound Stadium, setting a new record in his only race there. He finished runner up to great rival Another Dancing Willie in the McAlinden Cup final before being bought by Londoner Arthur Probert for £200. He was sent to Paddy McEllistrim at Wimbledon Stadium before returning to Ireland, he set a new Irish national record for 525 yards and was entered for the 1940 Irish Derby. In every heat of the Derby he set a new track record and, by the time of the final, was a popular favourite. He beat the field including Another Dancing Willie in the final; the first time 30 seconds had been broken in a final.

Billy Quinn owned and trained another greyhound called Ballynennan Moon who was born in April 1939, five months before the war. In August he was to make his first appearance in public winning the North Kilkenny Stakes. In his first twenty races he won eight times but, in the last of those, he broke 30 seconds to defeat Roeside Liene and Quinn then negotiated a sale to Mrs Jessie Cearns, wife of the managing director of Wimbledon Stadium.

== Principal UK races ==
Grand National, White City (11 May, 525y h, £150)
Pos	Name of Greyhound	Trainer	SP	Time	Trap
1st	Juvenile Classic	Joe Harmon	1-1f	30.23	4
2nd	Chinese Cutlet	Albert Jonas	2-1	30.71	2
3rd	Speedway Rebel	Wembley	100-6	30.74	3
4th	Wooteys Kingmaker	E Harfield	5-1	30.90	1
5th	Falling Often	Sidney Orton	100-6	31.30	5

Gold Collar, Catford (1 June, 440y, £350)
Pos	Name of Greyhound	Trainer	SP	Time	Trap
1st	Cash Balance	Sidney Probert	100-7	25.74	5
2nd	Grosvenor Ferdinand	Jack Harvey	9-4jf	26.18	2
3rd	Trevs Despatch	Johnny Bullock	9-4jf	26.38	4
4th	Half A Mo	Johnny Bullock	25-1	26.42	3
5th	Berwick Trout	Cornelius Crowley	5-1	26.46	6
6th	Musical Duke	Cornelius Crowley	4-1	26.50	1

Scottish Greyhound Derby, Carntyne (6 Jul, 525y, £250)
Pos	Name of Greyhound	Trainer	SP	Time	Trap
1st	Ballycurren Soldier	H Irving	4-5f	29.65	1
2nd	G.R.Acumen		10-1	30.05	4
3rd	Grosvenor Ferdinand	Jack Harvey	3-1	30.09	5
4th	Junior Classic	Joe Harmon	2-1	30.13	6
5th	Athy Model		20-1	30.29	2
6th	Misty Law II	M Greenshields	20-1	30.53	3

Laurels, Wimbledon (28 Aug, 500y, £150)
Pos	Name of Greyhound	Trainer	SP	Time	Trap
1st	April Burglar	Ken Appleton	100-8	28.56	3
2nd	Rock Callan	Joe Harmon	9-4	28.70	2
3rd	Keel Creamery	Joe Harmon	8-1	29.10	5
4th	Rushwee Playboy	Cornelius Crowley	6-1	29.30	6
5th	Trevs Despatch	Johnny Bullock	100-8	29.42	4
6th	Shorn	Joe Harmon	2-1f	29.74	1
