= 1939 Irish Greyhound Derby =

- Venue: Markets Field Greyhound Stadium
- Location: Limerick
- End date: July 15
- Total prize money: Winner £225

The 1939 Irish Greyhound Derby took place during July with the final being held at Markets Field Greyhound Stadium in Limerick on 15 July. It was the first time that the race had been held outside Dublin.

The winner Marchin' Thro' Georgia won £225 and was owned by the Dorans.

== Final result ==
At Limerick, 15 July(over 525 yards):

Position	Name of Greyhound	Breeding	Trap	SP	Time	Trainer	Notes
1st	Marchin' Thro' Georgia	Church Parade - Stonepark	5	1-1f	30.05	J J Doran (Roscommon)	Track Record
2nd	Irish Rambler	Culrain - Little Eva	1	7-4	30.08	Lonergan (Limerick)	
3rd	Lombardstown Brother	Bella's Brother - Ballyneety Lady	3	8-1	30.16	Carroll (Limerick)	
4th	Reel Rasper	breeding unknown	6	7-1		Carrick-on-Suir	
5th	Midnight Bell	breeding unknown	2	10-1		Galway	
N/R	Pretty Forethought	Royal Tom - Pretty Bird	4			Larkin (Cork)	

=== Distances ===
8, ½ (lengths)

== Competition Report ==
Master Eamonn recorded a new track record of 30.15 secs in the second round beating the previous best of 30.17 set by a previous Derby finalist Brave Leader in 1939. Marchin' Thro' Georgia then clocked 30.18 when beating Irish Rambler by less than one length. In the first semi-final Marchin' Thro' Georgia beat Lombardstown Brother by four lengths in a time 30.22. In the second semi hot favourite Master Eamonn was eliminated when Irish Rambler beat Midnight Bill by five lengths in another new track record time of 30.10. The third and final race went to Reel Rasper half a length ahead of Pretty Forethought in 30.42.

In the final Marchin' Thro' Georgia impressed leading throughout and setting another track record of 30.05 with Irish Rambler only a neck behind in a time which would also have been a track record if not for the winner.

== See also ==
- 1939 UK & Ireland Greyhound Racing Year
