= Battersea Greyhound Track =

Greyhound racing track in London, England

- Location: Lombards Road and Vicarage Crescent, Battersea
- Coordinates: 51°28′20″N 0°10′33″W
- Opened: 1933
- Closed: 1936

Battersea Greyhound Track was a greyhound racing track in Battersea, south west London, within the London Borough of Wandsworth. It is not to be confused with the Wandsworth Stadium.

== Opening ==
The track opened in 1933 and was located near Lombards Road and Vicarage Crescent on the south bank of the River Thames. It had an official address of number 15 Lombard Road.

== Greyhound racing ==
Independent (unaffiliated to a governing body) greyhound racing took place until 1936. An application to reopen it in 1939 was objected to by the military as the entrance was too near to the railway bridge and sabotage was feared. There is speculation that the track could have been affiliated to the Greyhound Racing Association at some stage and that it raced under National Greyhound Racing Club rules but there is no evidence of this in the track lists of 1934 and 1935.

== Today ==
The site of the track was very close to the modern day Fred Wells Gardens.
