= Chesterfield Sports Stadium =

Greyhound racing stadium in Derbyshire, England

- Location: Station Road, Brimington, Chesterfield, Derbyshire
- Coordinates: 53°15′20″N 1°24′52″W
- Opened: 1939
- Closed: 2000

Chesterfield Sports Stadium was a greyhound racing stadium in Station Road, Brimington, Chesterfield, Derbyshire.

== Origins ==
The stadium began to take form in 1939, shortly before World War II. On 26 March 1939, Albert Mowbray (a farmer by trade) applied for a racing licence and construction of track for 2,000 spectators under the Betting and Lotteries Act 1934. The site chosen was a rural setting in Brimington north of Chesterfield near an old Brimington Colliery air shaft. Access to the stadium was from Station Road and then down the lane leading to Ryecroft Farm. Directly on the west side of the new track was the Chesterfield Canal.

== Opening ==
The stadium also known as Wheeldon Mill opened during late 1939, despite initial refusals from the Chesterfield Town Council to allow the plans to go ahead. Racing was independent (not affiliated to the sports governing body the National Greyhound Racing Club). The hare system was an electric Sumner. The capacity was later listed as 8,000 spectators in late 1940s.

== History ==
During the 1960s the track raced on Monday and Friday. The circuit was large with a circumference of 440 yards resulting in race distances of 285, 358, 453, 480, 510 and 700 yards. The hare system was an 'Inside Sumner' and races were both level break races (normal) and handicap races.

By 1985 the stadium was owned by Albert Ullyett and J Liles and facilities had improved with veterinary surgeon attendance, a totalisator, car parking for 400 vehicles, a new stand and refreshment bar. Race distances had changed to 100, 290, 358, 452, 500, 700 and 880 yards and annual competitions were run over the four distances used for grading racing. Race nights were Monday, Wednesday and Friday and whippet racing also took place occasionally including a whippet Derby in November.

== Decline and closure ==
The stadium was subject of a redevelopment application by the local football team in May 1998 but following a petition the application was refused and stadium owner Joan Ullyett continued the racing. The track eventually closed in November 2000 and became in a state of disrepair. The site was demolished in 2018 and is now home to the Heritage Green housing estate.
