= Carntyne Stadium =

Stadium in Glasgow, Scotland

Coordinates: 55.856194°N 4.194556°W

- Interactive map of Carntyne Stadium
- Location: Carntyne, Glasgow

Construction
- Opened: 17 September 1927
- Closed: 1972

Carntyne Stadium was a multi-sports stadium situated in the Carntyne area of Glasgow, Scotland, used mainly for greyhound racing and speedway.

== Origins and opening ==
The Carntyne Greyhound Racecourse was situated between the Parkhead and Carntyne areas of Glasgow and opened for greyhound racing on 17 September 1927. The stadium ran along the railway track sandwiched between the railway and Myreside Street and was built on the site of a former running and trotting track. There were entrances on Myreside Street and at the far end of Duke Street just before the railway bridge and on the east side was a large wheel and axle works.

== Greyhound Racing ==
=== History ===
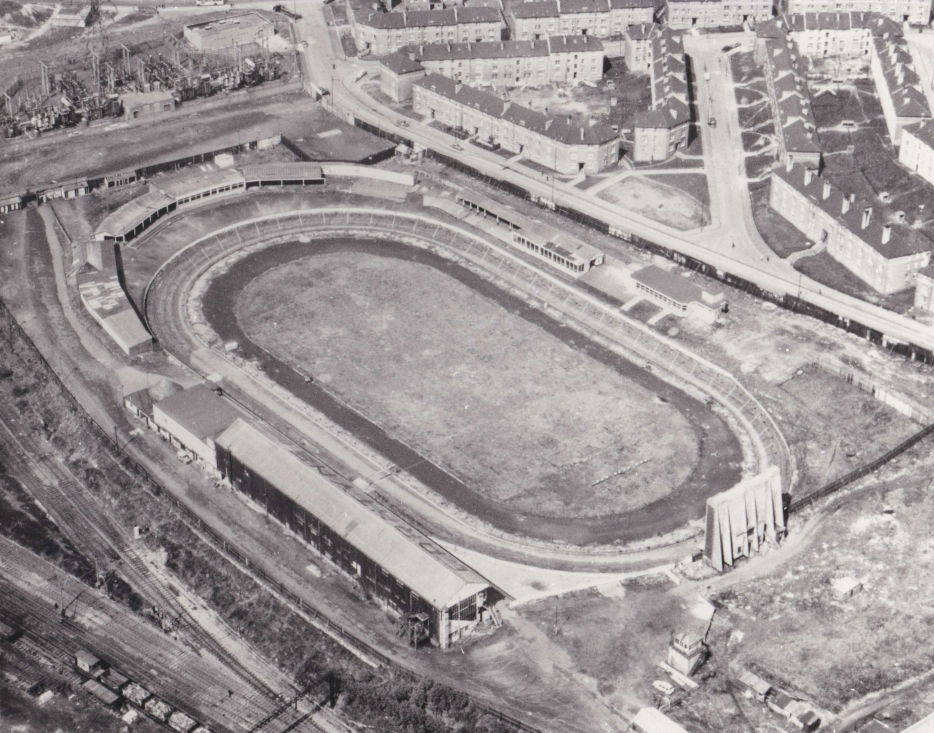
Carntyne Greyhound Stadium c.1950

The Scottish Greyhound Racing Company Ltd led by Jack Nixon Browne (later Lord Craigton) constructed the new stadium and became a National Greyhound Racing Society (NGRS) affiliated track. An odd shaped speedway track was built inside the greyhound circuit and greyhound racing took place five nights a week, Monday, Tuesday, Wednesday, Friday and Saturday at 7.45pm with a 6d entrance fee for the main enclosure. There was an M.S Cable outside hare and a Union totalisator.

Within a year of opening the Scottish Greyhound Derby was inaugurated and the first greyhound to lift the crown was the Powderhall Stadium trained Glinger Bank. In 1927 the St Mungo Cup was added to the tracks major competitions. Ballycurreen Soldier trained by Patrick McKinney became a local superstar after a series of victories including the All England Cup in 1939, the Scottish Derby for trainer H Irving in 1940, the Scottish Derby in 1942 when trained by Michael Conroy and two more St Mungo Cup wins. After the war the track was valued by the owners at £3,700 but the taxman valuation set the figure of £4,500.

A casino was added in 1962 along with a new grandstand bar before the Greyhound Racing Association property trust claimed ownership of the track with the intentions of selling the site for redevelopment and lucrative returns. With little warning Carntyne ceased trading during the month of May 1972.

=== Competitions ===
- Scottish Greyhound Derby
- St Mungo Cup

== Speedway ==
Stadium Manager Jack Nixon Browne (later an MP who went to the House of Lords as Lord Craigton) staged two dirt track speedway meetings in 1928. A new promotion built a new track in 1930 and four meetings were staged in ten days before it closed.

== Stock Cars ==
On 24 June 1966 Spedeworth Scotland introduced Stock Car racing to the venue using a tarmac oval circuit. The final was for the West of Scotland Championship with Tiger Thomson the victor.

== Football ==
Scottish Junior football club Bridgeton Waverley F.C. played their matches at the stadium for two years from 1960 after leaving their New Barrowfield ground (about one mile to the south), until disbanding in 1962.

== Closure ==
The site was sold and knocked down in 1972 but no redevelopment took place; all that remained for 40 years was the small brick Duke Street entrance with the badly faded words 'Carntyne' above. This was not saved for heritage purposes and was cleared following the cleanup for the 2014 Commonwealth Games. A modern housing development, Eastfields, now occupies the site.

== Track records ==
Distance yards	Greyhound	Time	Date	Notes
300	Man Friday	16.80	20.06.1931	
400	Telepathy	25.38	05.08.1931	
500	Jesmond Cutlet	28.20	20.09.1937	
525	Telepathy	30.40	13.07.1931	
525	Cheerful Comedy	29.02	01.11.1947	
525	Poetic Licence	28.71	12.05.1962	
525	Dusty Trail	28.54	1970	
700	Robins Reward	41.15	12.08.1933	
700	Well Schooled	40.18	09.1937	
700	Bounce About	39.54	20.10.1962	
880	Jersey Beauty	52.50	15.08.1936	
260 H	Molly Munro	15.50	23.09.1933	
500 H	Rich Cream	29.33	30.07.1938	
525 H	Hawkswood Hill	30.76	24.05.1947	
