= Birchfield Ladbroke Stadium =

Former greyhound racing track in Birmingham

Birchfield Ladbroke Stadium (old Perry Barr Stadium)
- Interactive map of Birchfield Ladbroke Stadium (old Perry Barr Stadium)
- Location: Regina Drive, Walsall Road, Birmingham, England
- Coordinates: 52°31′06″N 1°54′18″W

Construction
- Opened: 1928
- Renovated: 1970
- Closed: 1984

Tenants
- Greyhound racing Birmingham Brummies

The Birchfield Ladbroke Stadium, also known as the old Perry Barr Greyhound Stadium or Alexander Sports Stadium, was a former greyhound racing and Motorcycle speedway stadium in Birchfield in the north of Birmingham, England.

It is not to be confused with the Perry Barr Stadium on the other side of the Walsall Road which staged greyhound racing from 1984 to 2025.

== Origins ==
The third greyhound track to open in Birmingham was Perry Barr in the Birchfield area of North Birmingham. Kings Heath Stadium and Hall Green Stadium had both opened in 1927 to large audiences and Perry Barr soon followed in the spring of 1928. The track was situated west of the Walsall Road on the opposite side of the road from the Alexander Sports Ground and accessed on Regina Drive. The River Tame ran below the stadium next to the railway tracks before being diverted in the 1990s.

== Opening ==
The opening night was on 7 April 1928 and was promoted by the Birmingham Greyhound Club Limited. The stadium had been built to the cost of £70,000. A crowd of 15,000 attended the first meeting and saw a greyhound called Town Square win the first race (over 500 yards).

Despite the fact that the sport was experiencing a boom for some reason the promoters ran into financial difficulties and within two years were left bankrupt. The Birmingham Greyhound Club Limited had failed to capitalise on the growing interest observed all around the country. A licence to continue racing was refused in November 1928 due to evidence of funds owed and the official receiver announced that £95,000 was owed to creditors during a meeting in August 1929 (an extraordinary amount based on the fact that the stadium had only cost £75,000 to build).

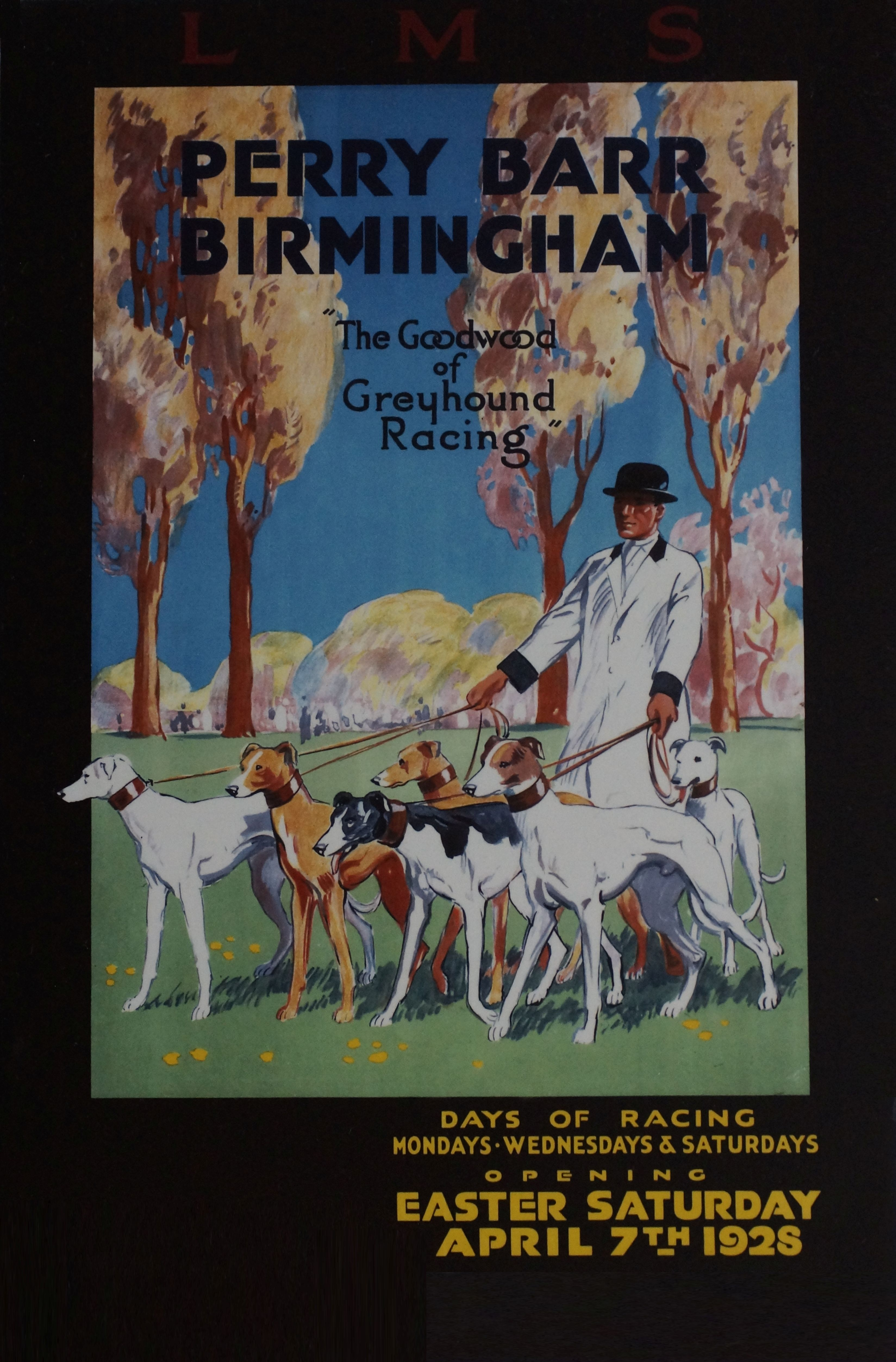
London, Midland and Scottish Railway poster advertising the opening

== Pre-war history ==
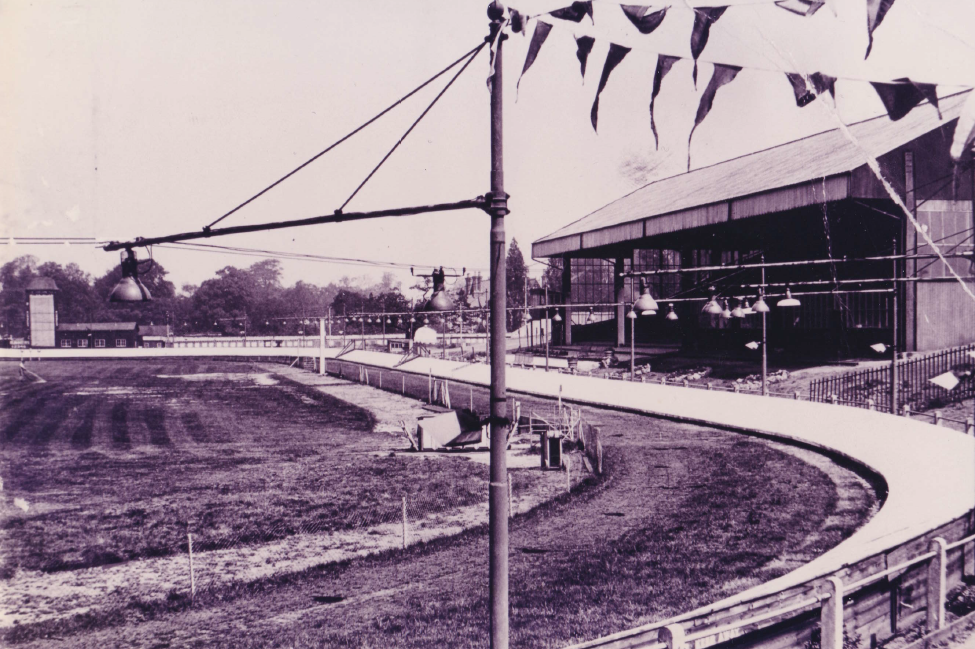
Perry Barr Stadium Walsall Road c.1950

Perry Barr Stadium Ltd became the new promoters of greyhound racing and the circuit was described as a good galloping track with long straights and banked bends suiting all types of dogs, especially large, wide and 'leggy-on-the-turn' varieties. The circumference was 462 yards with distances of 500, 525 & 700 yards behind an M&S cable outside hare. The Racing Manager was Mr J.Poole.

Next to the car park was the 3’6 enclosure and the main stand with dining facilities, a milk bar and tote booths. On the opposite side of the track was the 2’6 enclosure, another milk bar and the club stand. On the first bend was the race kennels and paddock featuring four ranges of kennels for forty dogs each, three of these were for home trained dogs with the fourth being for newcomers and visitors. There was also an isolation block for sick and injured dogs with a separate surgery.

Mick the Miller attracted thousands in 1931 when he took on two hounds in match races. He beat St Leger champion Maidens Boy on 8 August but lost to Northern Flat champion Ross Regatta on 19 September. A disastrous fire in April 1937 failed to halt progress at this Midlands track, the fire caused £12,000 worth of damage, a very significant figure in 1937. The Birmingham Cup was introduced in 1939 as the premier event to be held annually and it was quickly established as a notable competition.

During the war years the Mr Bithel owned, Tom Baldwin trained Model Dasher won the Midland Puppy Derby and Eclipse. The white and brindle dog then broke two track records before winning the Key, the Test, Wembley Gold Cup and Birmingham Cup in 1944.

== Post-war history ==
In 1947 Slaney Record trained by Jack Toseland finished third in the English Greyhound Derby and the following year Baytown Stork qualified for the Derby final. Toseland was to train four more Derby finalists (three in the next four years), Saft Alex in 1949, Black Mire the runner up in 1951, Dashboard Dan in 1952 and Shy Prairie some years later in 1965.

In 1970 another fire caused extensive damage but the main stand was rebuilt with a new restaurant and bar facilities and the track reopened soon after. Frank Baldwin had taken over kennels owned by his father Tom (who would retire to Wales) and along with fellow trainers John Bassett, Bertie Gaynor, Paddy McEvoy and Barbara Tompkins they made the track the strongest provincial track in the country. John Rowe a former trainer at Knowle Stadium and Oxford Stadium and Racing Manager at Leicester Stadium switched to the take over at Perry Barr. John’s son Bob was Racing Manager at rival track Hall Green Stadium.

On 23 April 1974 win number twelve came the way of Westpark Mustard over 550 yards at the track, when she was challenging the world record. In 1976 the stadium was bought by Ladbrokes and renamed the Birchfield Ladbroke Stadium, the purchase had arisen after Ladbrokes missed out on securing a takeover of Romford Greyhound Stadium and Brighton & Hove Greyhound Stadium, beaten to it by Coral. As a result, they turned their attention to the Midlands and bought Perry Barr and the Totalisators and Greyhound Holdings, which owned six stadia at Brough Park, Crayford & Bexleyheath, Leeds, Gosforth, Willenhall and Monmore.

Further investment followed with facilities being updated by the bookmaking giant, £100,000 was spent including new lighting. In 1981 they hosted the trainer's championship. Jim Woods, formerly Charlie Boulton’s assistant at Harringay Stadium took up the position of Racing Manager in 1982. The racing pattern was Tuesdays, Thursday and Saturdays.

== Closure ==
In the 1980s rumours surfaced regarding the desire of Ladbrokes to sell the land to developers, unsettled trainers Paddy Hancox and Bertie Gaynor moved to Hall Green and Coventry respectively which became a huge problem for the track. The rumours proved to be true when a sale to developers was agreed and the site sold, the last meeting was held on 14 April 1984, 56 years after it had opened. The site today is the huge 'One Stop' shopping centre and not a single sign of the old track exists but greyhound racing did resume in 1990 at the nearby Perry Barr Stadium.

== Competitions ==
- Birmingham Cup

== Track records ==
Distance (yards)	Greyhound	Time	Date	Notes
340	Sufi	18.88	4 August 1960	
500	Model Dasher	28.24	31 March 1944	
500	Blackburn Blue	28.30	11 October 1950	
525	Shy Flyer	30.88	5 April 1937	
525	Perry Barr	30.68	2 April 1938	
525	Neidin's Bunty	30.36	3 March 1939	
525	Black Johnny	29.76	7 May 1939	Birmingham Cup final
525	Halston's Parade	29.56	3 May 1940	Birmingham Cup heats
525	Low Pressure	29.42	July 1960	Birmingham Cup consolation
525y	Dromin Glory	29.31	4 August 1962	
525y	Discretions	29.24	1968+	Birmingham Cup heats
550y	Piper Apache	30.72	21 August 1963	
700y	Model Dasher	40.18	1946+	
700y	Brandy Soda	39.90	28 November 1964	
755y	Lancewood Olly	43.89	2 August 1958	
880y	Shanbally More	51.88	7 March 1964	
500yH	Brindled Beggar	29.25	1950+	
525yH	Holiday Thrill	30.83	1946+	
525yH	Happy Reveller	30.72	17 June 1965	
310m	Major Arkle	18.63	1983+	
475m	Ardralla Victory	29.13	1983+	
485m	Miles Apart	29.69	20.05.1975	
500m	Ramblers Jet	31.16	1981+	
500m	Ramblers Jet	31.04	1981+	
500m	Desert Pilot	30.88	09.08.1979	
500m	Special Account	30.58	1983+	
650m	Colums Corner	41.12	14.08.1979	
650m	Brainy Prince	40.77	1983+	
725m	Ritas Hero	45.78	1983+	
830m	Decoy Boom	53.17	1983+	
890m	Corleys Kizzy	57.77	1983+	
915m	Carols Star	60.18	1983+	
475mH	Keen Fowler	29.93	1983+	
500mH	Keslake Banjo	31.92	1983+	

+ Record holder during year
