= Lady Mary Clive =

British writer and historian

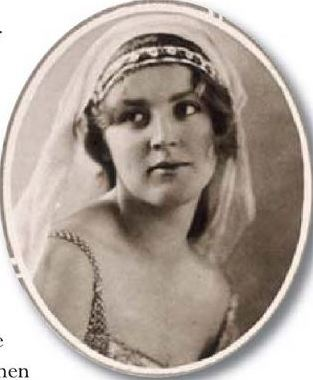
Lady Mary Clive

Lady Mary Katherine Clive (née Pakenham 23 August 1907 – 19 March 2010) was a British writer and historian, known for her memoirs of her family and her time as a debutante.

== Life ==
Born into the Anglo-Irish Longford family, Lady Mary was the fourth child of Thomas Pakenham, 5th Earl of Longford. After the Earl was killed at the Battle of Gallipoli in World War I in 1915, Lady Mary's mother, the daughter of the 7th Earl of Jersey, was greatly affected by her husband's death, and her sorrow affected her relationship with her six children. Mary's childhood was split between North Aston Hall in Oxfordshire and summer and Easter at Tullynally Castle in County Westmeath, Ireland. Her siblings later achieved individual prominence, her elder brother Edward was a politician and artistic director of Dublin's Gate Theatre, while her other brother was Lord Longford, a politician and social reformer. She had three sisters, Violet, a biographer, Pansy, a novelist, and Julia.

She and her siblings had few friends outside of her immediate family, a fact that she attributed to the out-of-date clothes that they wore as children. Lady Mary said that perhaps her mother had not "noticed that children's fashions had changed and as we grew older, we became acutely aware of the eccentricity of our appearance...summer and winter alike, we had to wear brown, ribbed woolen stockings and brown boots, which were a nuisance all the year round...worse still was the shame of them, which ate into our very souls." Of her 1964 memoir The Day of Reckoning, the Daily Telegraph said that she wrote "with the acuteness of observation and lack of sentimentality that characterised her own personality."

The Guardian said that "Mary, like her brothers and sisters, [had] a fierce independence of spirit and a positive relish for being different." Her childhood Christmases were spent at her mother's ancestral home of Middleton Park in Oxfordshire, and she recalled these in her 1955 novel Christmas with the Savages.

Lady Mary married Meysey Clive, a soldier and Herefordshire landowner, the son of Percy Clive and older brother of Lewis Clive. She moved to Whitfield, the Clive family home, in Herefordshire's Golden Valley. Lady Mary returned Whitfield to its original Georgian design after the war, removing the Victorian wings of the house. With her husband Mary began creating a book based on old letters and diaries from her husband's great-grandmother, Caroline Clive, which was published in 1949. In 1943, her husband, a colonel in the Grenadier Guards, was killed in North Africa during World War II. They had two children, George, who predeceased her, and a daughter, Alice, a former High Sheriff of Cornwall, who is married to Simon Lennox-Boyd, 2nd Viscount Boyd of Merton. Lady Mary raised her children in Rabbit Cottage, the head gardener's house on the estate, while the Canadian High Commission occupied the house. She lived in Herefordshire, near the Black Mountains, from the end of the war until her death. Lady Mary went blind shortly before her death and died in a nursing home at the age of 102.

Lady Mary was a sister-in-law of the historian and biographer Elizabeth Longford, with whom she would travel as they were researching books. Clive would assist her in recognising historic battlefields in Spain and Portugal when she was researching the life of the Duke of Wellington.

== Career ==
She was presented as a debutante in 1926, an experience that she described in her memoir Brought Up and Brought Out (1938), that focused on the darker side of life as a debutante. She described 1926 as a 'bumper dowdy year' for debutantes, and the men she was introduced to as 'practically deformed...Some were without chins. Some had no foreheads. Hardly any of them had backs to their heads.' She also advertised Pond's cold cream during her time as a debutante.

The 1926 United Kingdom general strike occurred the same year, and she served tea to striking lorry drivers. Her intelligence was considered a handicap for a debutante, so Lady Mary had to 'palm herself off as a low-brow'. Lady Mary spent three seasons as a debutante and then resolved to get a job, lodging in Chelsea for almost five years. In 1931 she embarked on a trip around the world, beginning in Canada in a luxury hotel and ending on a sheep station in New Zealand. She later went on a secret solo bicycle trip across France and Switzerland.

Lady Mary took a secretarial course, and worked for a writer who praised free love; however she found work insufficiently rewarding and then resolved not to work again unless she was extremely well paid. As an art student she studied in London, Rome, and Munich, and on her return shared a studio in Chelsea where her younger sister Violet would pose nude for her.

As a gossip columnist she suffered from the "smallness of a smart person's visiting list" and relied on her younger sisters for material. The popularity of the memoir led to Lord Beaverbrook signing Clive for the Londoner's Diary section of his London Evening Standard. She nicknamed Beaverbrook the 'Goblin King', and he later appointed her a chief reporter. She said of the beginning of her journalistic career that she '...only started writing for the papers because it was a terrific novelty—and there was a substantial cheque.' She earned ten guineas a week for her two columns, on dresses and 'intelligent' gossip. Her fellow writers on the Londoner's Diary included Peter Fleming, the brother of Ian Fleming and John Betjeman. In 1937 Lady Mary was a contributor to the short lived magazine Night and Day, edited by Graham Greene.

Lady Mary wrote two historical biographies, of John Donne and King Edward IV of England. Much earlier (between 1932 and 1937) she also wrote four novels, for which she used the pen-name "Hans Duffy".

== Bibliography ==
Memoir

- Brought Up and Brought Out (1938)
- Christmas with the Savages (1955)
- The Day of Reckoning (1964)

History

- Jack and the Doctor: John Donne 1572-1631 (1966)
- This Sun of York: A Biography of Edward IV (1973)

Novels as Hans Duffy

- In England Now (1932)
- Seven by Seven (1933)
- Lucasta's Wedding (1936)
- Under the Sugar-Plum Tree (1937)
