= Lady Violet Powell =

British writer and critic (1912–2002)

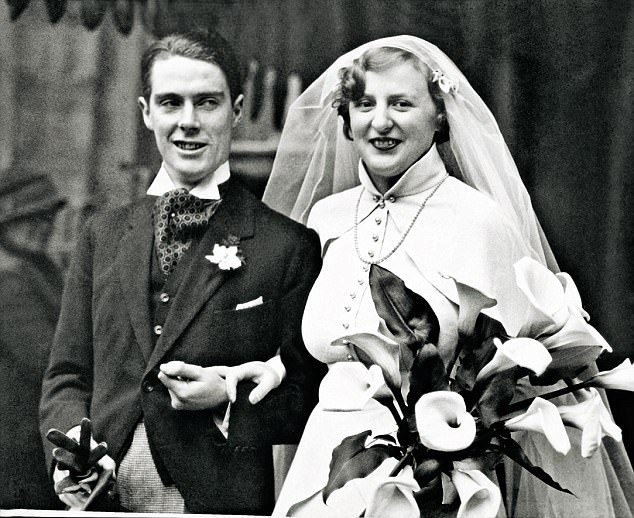
- Lady Violet and Anthony Powell on their wedding day in 1934.
- Born: Lady Violet Georgiana Pakenham; 13 March 1912
- Died: 12 January 2002 (aged 89)
- Occupations: Writer, critic
- Spouse: Anthony Powell (m. 1934; died 2000)
- Children: 2, including Tristram Powell
- Parents: Thomas Pakenham, 5th Earl of Longford; Lady Mary Child-Villiers
- Relatives: Edward Pakenham, 6th Earl of Longford (brother); Frank Pakenham, 7th Earl of Longford (brother); Lady Pansy Lamb (sister); Lady Mary Clive (sister); Victor Child-Villiers, 7th Earl of Jersey (maternal grandfather)
- Writing career
- Genres: Memoir, biography

Lady Violet Georgiana Powell (née Pakenham; 13 March 1912 – 12 January 2002) was a British writer and critic. Her husband was the author Anthony Powell.

== Life and career ==
Lady Violet was the third daughter of Thomas Pakenham, 5th Earl of Longford, and the former Lady Mary Child-Villiers, daughter of Victor Child-Villiers, 7th Earl of Jersey. She was educated at St Margaret's School, Bushey.

Lady Violet was a member of a literary family; her brothers were Edward Pakenham, 6th Earl of Longford and Frank Pakenham, 7th Earl of Longford, while her sisters included the novelist and biographer Lady Pansy Lamb and the historian Lady Mary Clive. She was a distinguished memoirist and biographer. Her biography The Life of a Provincial Lady (1988), about E. M. Delafield, has been called by the scholar Nicholas Birns "one of the best literary biographies of a British writer in the twentieth century". Those who knew the couple well believed that Lady Violet made significant contributions to the richness, depth and polish of her husband's work. She also wrote a biography of the English novelist Flora Annie Steel.

Anthony Powell's novel, Agents and Patients, is dedicated to Lady Violet.

== Influence ==
She is generally taken to be the model for the character of Isobel Tolland in her husband's novel sequence A Dance to the Music of Time.

== Books ==
Some of her books are:

- A Substantial Ghost: The Literary Adventures of Maude ffoulkes (1967)
- The Irish Cousins: The Books and Background of Somerville and Ross (1970)
- Margaret, Countess of Jersey: A Biography (1978)
- Flora Annie Steel: Novelist of India (1981)
- The Constant Novelist: A Study of Margaret Kennedy, 1896–1967 (1983)
- A Compton-Burnett Compendium (1973)
- The Album of Anthony Powell's Dance to the Music of Time (1987)
- The Life of a Provincial Lady: A Study of E.M. Delafield and Her Works (1988)
- A Jane Austen Compendium: The Six Major Novels (1993)

=== Autobiography ===
- Five Out of Six: An Autobiography - a reference to her birth order amongst her siblings (1960)
- Within the Family Circle: An Autobiography (1976)
- The Departure Platform: An Autobiography (1998)
- A Stone in the Shade: Last Memoirs - posthumous (2013)

== Personal life ==
She married Anthony Powell (21 December 1905 – 28 March 2000) on 1 December 1934 at All Saints Anglican Church, Ennismore Gardens, Knightsbridge; they had two children, Tristram and John.
