= Eric Phipps =

British diplomat

The Right Honourable Sir Eric Phipps GCB GCMG GCVO
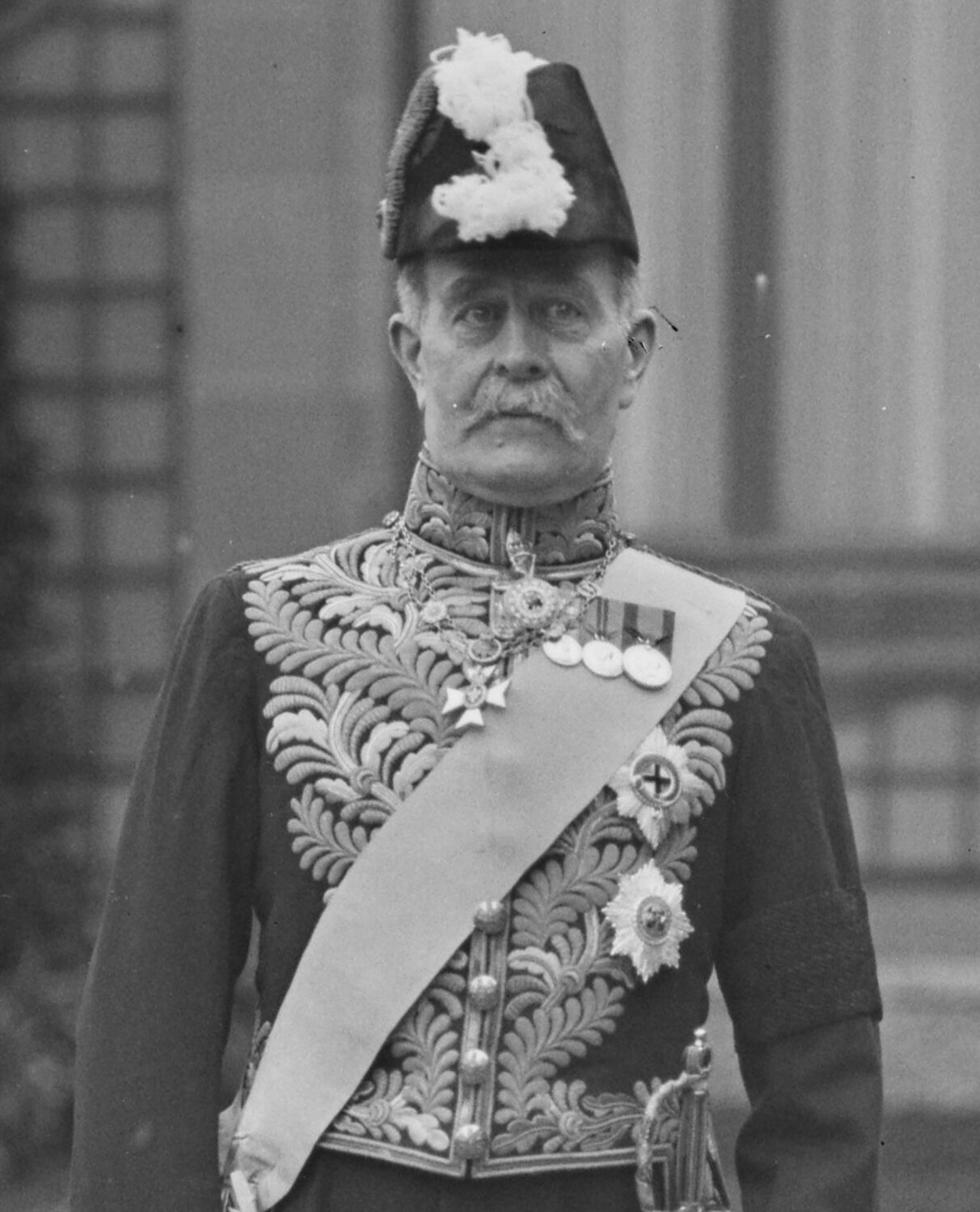
- Photograph of Sir Eric Phipps, 1926

British Ambassador to France
- In office 1937–1939
- Preceded by: Sir George Clerk
- Succeeded by: Sir Ronald Campbell

British Ambassador to Germany
- In office 1933–1937
- Preceded by: Sir Horace Rumbold
- Succeeded by: Sir Nevile Henderson

Personal details
- Born: Eric Clare Edmund Phipps; 27 October 1875
- Died: 13 August 1945 (aged 69) London Clinic
- Spouse(s): Yvonne de Louvencourt (m. 1907; died 1909) Frances Ward (m. 1911; died 1945)
- Relations: Jeremy Phipps (grandson)
- Children: 6
- Parent(s): Sir Constantine Phipps; Maria Jane Miller Mundy
- Education: King's College, Cambridge; University of Paris

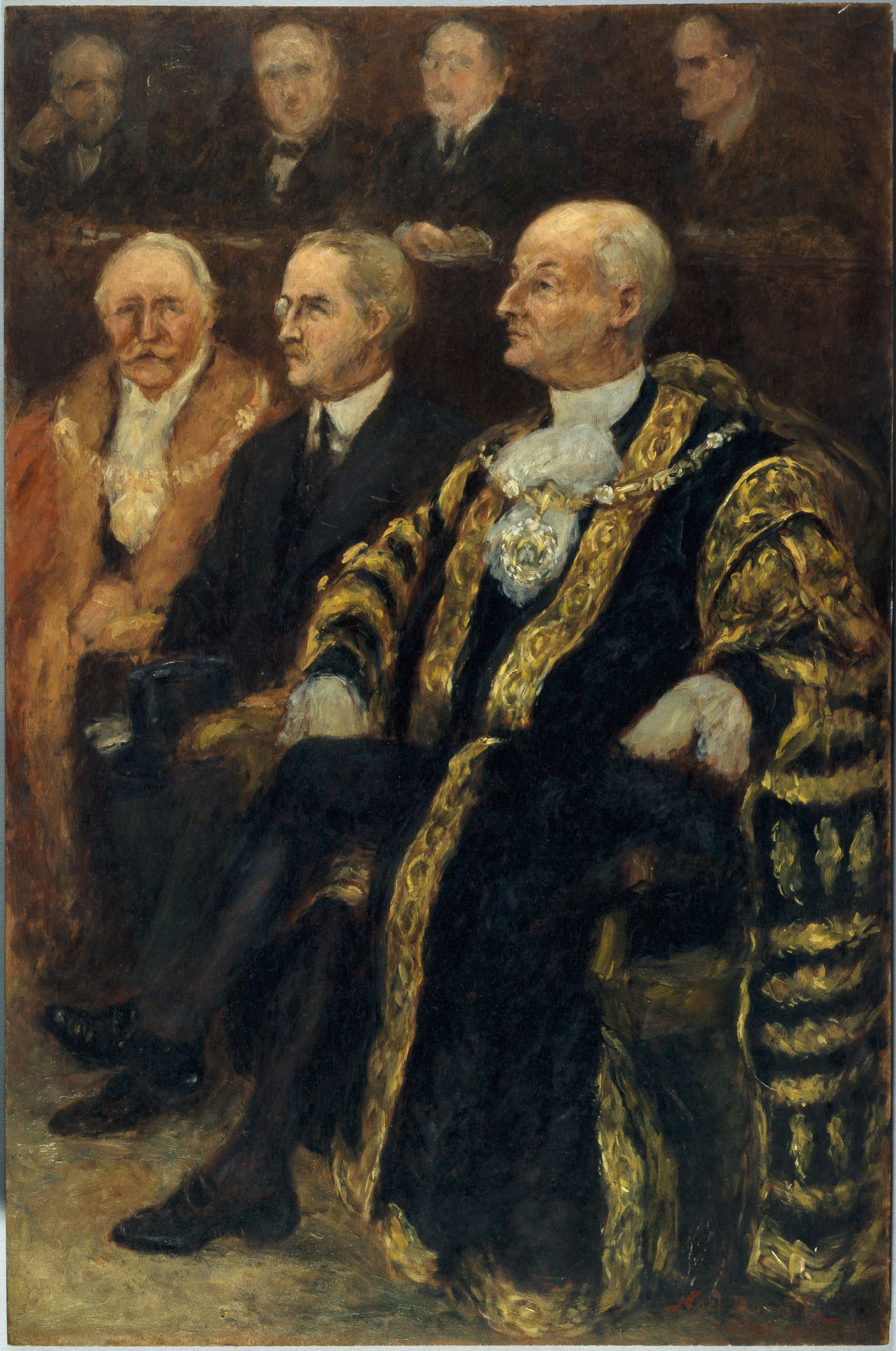
George Broadbridge and Eric Phipps (left) in June 1937.

Sir Eric Clare Edmund Phipps GCB GCMG GCVO PC (27 October 1875 – 13 August 1945) was a British diplomat.

== Early life ==
Phipps was the son of Sir Constantine Phipps, later British Ambassador to Belgium, and his wife, Maria Jane Miller Mundy.

Henry Phipps, 1st Earl of Mulgrave, was his great-grandfather, and he was also a great-grandson of Lieutenant-General Sir Colin Campbell, who was present at the Battle of Waterloo, and of Rear-Admiral Sir John Hindmarsh, who was a lieutenant on HMS Phoebe at the Battle of Trafalgar.

As a child, he accompanied his parents around Europe to his father's various postings. He was educated at King's College, Cambridge, and the University of Paris, from which he graduated.

== Career ==
He passed the competitive examination for entry to the Diplomatic Service in January 1899 and was posted as an attaché to Paris in October 1899, being promoted Third Secretary in January 1901.

In January 1905 he was posted to Constantinople, was promoted Second Secretary in April and returned to London to work at the Foreign Office in September. In September 1906, he was posted to Rome and in February 1909, he returned to Paris as private secretary to Sir Francis Bertie, British Ambassador to France. In April 1912, he was promoted First Secretary and posted to St Petersburg, transferred to Madrid in October 1913. He returned to Paris in May 1916.

He was on the staff of the British delegation to the Versailles Conference until September 1919, when he was promoted to counsellor and posted back to London. In November 1920, he was posted to Brussels as chargé d'affaires, and in November 1922, he was promoted to minister plenipotentiary and posted back to Paris, often serving as chargé d'affaires in the absence of the ambassador.

In June 1928, Phipps received his first independent posting as Envoy Extraordinary and Minister Plenipotentiary to Austria.

=== Ambassador to Germany ===
In 1933, Phipps was appointed British Ambassador to Germany. To some extent, he followed policies later known as appeasement, as he believed that the League of Nations was the key to preventing the next war. He tried to enlist the French in efforts to get the Germans to co-operate.

However, in some despatches, he warned the British government about the character of the régime. On 31 January 1934, he told his Foreign Secretary:

[Hitler's] policy is simple and straightforward. If his neighbours allow him, he will become strong by the simplest and most direct methods. The mere fact that he is making himself unpopular abroad will not deter him, for, as he said in a recent speech, it is better to be respected and feared than to be weak and liked. If he finds that he arouses no real opposition, the tempo of his advance will increase. On the other hand, if he is vigorously opposed, he is unlikely at this stage to risk a break.

Phipps gave a further warning on 1 April 1935 of Germany's growing military strength:

Let us hope our pacifists at home may at length realise that the rapidly-growing monster of German militarism will not be placated by mere cooings, but will only be restrained from recourse to its ultima ratio by the knowledge that the Powers who desire peace are also strong enough to enforce it.

During his first year in Berlin, Phipps managed to see Hitler only four times. Phipps himself regarded Hitler as something of a cipher or enigma; Hitler was variously described in his dispatches back to London as more moderate than his followers or as possibly mad. In May 1936, Phipps presented to Hitler the famous "questionnaire", largely written by his brother-in-law, the Under-Secretary of State for Foreign Affairs, Sir Robert Vansittart, that asked point-blank if Germany intended "to respect the existing territorial and political status of Europe" and was willing to sign "genuine treaties". Neither Hitler nor any other German leader ever responded to the "questionnaire".

=== Ambassador to France ===
In 1937, Phipps was posted to Paris as British Ambassador to France.

During his time in Paris, Phipps strongly identified himself with French Foreign Minister Georges Bonnet, and most of his dispatches to London reflected Bonnet's influence. On 24 September 1938, at the height of the great crisis over Czechoslovakia that was to culminate in the Munich Agreement, Phipps reported back to London "all that is best in France is against war, almost at any price", but it was opposed by a "small, but noisy and corrupt, war group". Phipps's negative assessment of the willingness and ability of France to go to war with Germany in 1938 created doubts in London about the value of France as an ally.

In October 1938, Bonnet carried out a purge of the Quai d'Orsay, sidelining a number of officials opposed to his policy. In the aftermath of the purge, Bonnet was congratulated by Phipps for removing the "warmongers" René Massigli and Pierre Comert from the Quai d'Orsay, but he went on to complain that Bonnet should have sacked Secretary-General Alexis Saint-Legér Léger as well. In response, Bonnet claimed that he and Saint-Legér Léger saw "eye to eye". Phipps, who knew about the state of relations between the two, drily noted that "in that case the eyes must be astigmatic".

In November 1939, suffering from ill-health, Phipps retired to West Stowell House, near Marlborough, Wiltshire. He was a member of White's, the St James’s Club, the Turf Club, and the Beefsteak Club.

== Honours ==
Phipps was appointed Companion of the Order of St Michael and St George (CMG) in the 1920 New Year Honours, Commander of the Royal Victorian Order (CVO) in May 1922, Knight Commander of the Order of St Michael and St George (KCMG) in the 1927 Birthday Honours, Knight Grand Cross of the Order of St Michael and St George (GCMG) in 1934, Knight Grand Cross of the Royal Victorian Order (GCVO) in 1939, and Knight Grand Cross of the Order of the Bath (GCB) in 1941. He was appointed to the Privy Council in 1933, entitling him to the style "The Right Honourable". He also held the Grand Cross of the Legion d'Honneur and was a Commander of the Order of Leopold II of Belgium.

In 1943 he served as High Sheriff of Wiltshire.

== Personal life ==
Phipps married Yvonne de Louvencourt in 1907. After her death in 1909 he married Frances Ward (1893–1988), daughter of the sculptor Herbert Ward, in 1911. He had six children, all by his second wife:

- Mervyn Phipps (1912–1983), a Lieutenant-Colonel.
- Alan Phipps (1915–1942), a Lieutenant in the Royal Navy; he was killed in action on Leros.
- Mary Phipps (1923-2009), who married Bonar Sykes, son of Sir Frederick Sykes and his wife Isabel, a daughter of former British Prime Minister Bonar Law.
- Margaret Phipps (1925-2009), who married George Cary, son of the Irish novelist Joyce Cary.
- John-Francis Phipps (b. 1933)
- William Phipps (1936–2009), silversmith, married Henrietta Frances Lamb (1931–2016), elder daughter of the painter Henry Lamb and his wife Lady Pansy Lamb (née Pakenham), sister of the 6th and 7th Earls of Longford

He died of a pulmonary embolism following a prostatectomy at the London Clinic in 1945.

=== Descendants ===
Through his second son Alan, he was a grandfather of Major-General Jeremy Phipps (1942–2021).

== Ancestry ==
Ancestors of Eric Phipps

16. Constantine Phipps, 1st Baron Mulgrave
8. Henry Phipps, 1st Earl of Mulgrave
17. Lady Lepel Hervey (daughter of John, Lord Hervey of Ickworth)
4. Hon Edmund Phipps (1808–1857)
18. Christopher Thompson Maling (1742–1810)
9. Martha Thompson Maling (1771–1849)
19. Martha Shiels (1748–1820)
2. Sir Constantine Phipps
20. John Campbell (1749–1790) of Melfort
10. Sir Colin Campbell
21. Colina Campbell, daughter of John Campbell of Achalader
5. Maria Campbell (−1888)
22. Henry Harnden
11. Jane Harnden (−1838)
.
1. Sir Eric Phipps
24. Edward Miller Mundy (1750–1822)
12. Edward Miller Mundy (1777–1834)
25. Frances Meynell (−1783)
6. Alfred Miller Mundy (1809–1887)
26. Francis Barton
13. Nelly Barton (1770–1830)
.
3. Maria Miller Mundy (1844–1902)
28. John Hindmarsh (1753–1822)
14. Sir John Hindmarsh
29. Mary Roxburgh (1753-)
7. Jane Hindmarsh (1814–73)
30. Henry Dixon Edmeades (1759–1823)
15. Susanna Edmeades (1786–1859)
31. Susanna Wilson (1756–1795)

Diplomatic posts
| Preceded by Sir Horace Rumbold | British Ambassador to Germany; 1933–1937 | Succeeded by Sir Nevile Henderson |
| Preceded by Sir George Clerk | British Ambassador to France; 1937–1939 | Succeeded by Sir Ronald Campbell |

== Sources ==
- Adamthwaite, Anthony. France and the Coming of the Second World War 1936–1939. London: Frank Cass, 1977. ISBN 0-7146-3035-7.
- Kidd, Charles, Williamson, David (editors). Debrett's Peerage and Baronetage (1990 edition). New York: St Martin's Press, 1990.
- Herman, John. The Paris Embassy of Sir Eric Phipps: Anglo-French Relations and the Foreign Office, 1937-1939, Sussex Academic Press, 1998.
- Oxford Dictionary of National Biography.
- Watt, D.C. How War Came : The Immediate Origins of the Second World War, 1938–1939. New York: Pantheon Books, 1989. ISBN 0-394-57916-X.
