= George Child Villiers, 9th Earl of Jersey =

English peer

The Right Honourable The Earl of Jersey
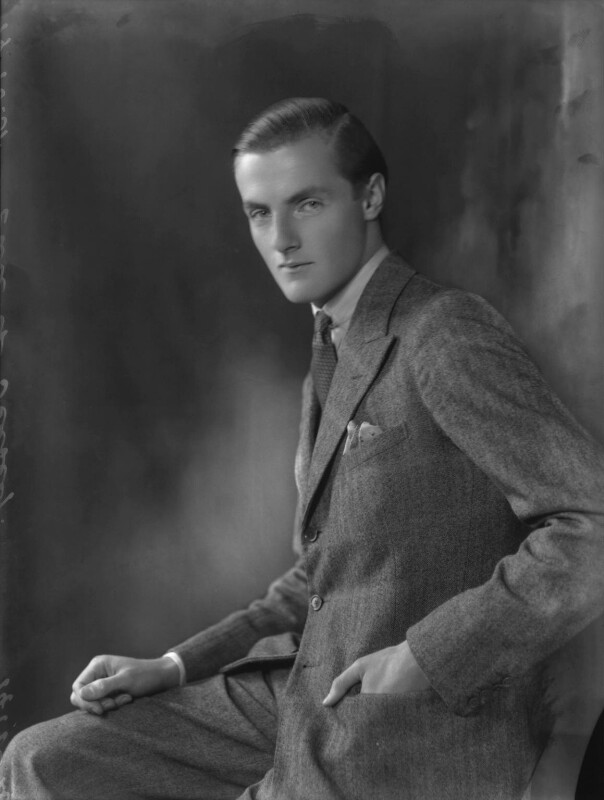
- Lord Jersey in 1931

Personal details
- Born: George Francis Child-Villiers; 15 February 1910
- Died: 9 August 1998 (aged 88)
- Spouses: Patricia Richards (m. 1932; div. 1937) Virginia Cherrill (m. 1937; div. 1946) Bianca Luciana Adriana Mottironi (m. 1947)
- Children: 4, including George
- Parent(s): George Child-Villiers, 8th Earl of Jersey; Lady Cynthia Needham
- Relatives: William Child-Villiers, 10th Earl of Jersey (grandson); Timothy Elliot-Murray-Kynynmound, 7th Earl of Minto (grandson)
- Education: Eton College
- Alma mater: Christ Church, Oxford

George Francis Child-Villiers, 9th Earl of Jersey (15 February 1910 – 9 August 1998), was an English peer and banker from the Villiers family. Lord Jersey gave one of the family seats, Osterley Park, to the British nation in the late 1940s. He was a descendant of King Henry VII of England.

== Early life ==
He was the son of George Child-Villiers, 8th Earl of Jersey, and the former Lady Cynthia Almina Constance Mary Needham. He had three younger siblings, Lady Joan Child Villiers (wife of David Colville), Edward Mansel Child Villiers (who married Barbara Mary Frampton and, secondly, to Princess Maria Gloria Pignatelli Aragona Cortez, only daughter of Prince Antonia Pignatelli Aragona Cortez, Duke of Terranova), and Lady Ann Child Villiers (the wife of Maj. Alexander Henry Elliot).

His paternal grandparents were Victor Child Villiers, 7th Earl of Jersey, and the Hon. Margaret Elizabeth (daughter of William Leigh, 2nd Baron Leigh). Among his extended Villiers family were aunts Lady Margaret Child Villiers (wife of Walter Rice, 7th Baron Dynevor), Lady Mary Julia Child Villiers (wife of Thomas Pakenham, 5th Earl of Longford) and Lady Beatrice Child Villiers (wife of Edward Plunkett, 18th Baron of Dunsany). His maternal grandparents were Francis Needham, 3rd Earl of Kilmorey, and Ellen Constance Baldock (a daughter of Edward Holmes Baldock, a Conservative MP for Shrewsbury).

He was educated at Eton College before attending Christ Church, Oxford.

== Career ==
Upon the death of his father at Middleton Park in December 1923, he succeeded as the 9th Earl of Jersey and inherited nearly 20,000 acres of land in England. Lord Jersey was a clerk with Glyn, Mills & Co. in 1932 and served as chairman of Wallace Brothers Sassoon Bank (taken over by the Standard Chartered Bank in 1976).

He fought in World War II, gaining the rank of Major in the Royal Artillery of the Territorial Army.

The 9th Earl was responsible for the remodelling of the family seat, Middleton Park in Oxfordshire, and employed Edwin Lutyens as an architect. When he tried to give Middleton to the National Trust, they refused on the grounds that the house had been remodelled by Lutyens – whose houses they now seek particularly. The 9th Earl gave Osterley Park in Hounslow to the nation in the late 1940s; he said of that house, "it took a trained staff of 12 to bring me a boiled egg in the morning, and the egg was always cold by the time it got to me!"

== Personal life ==
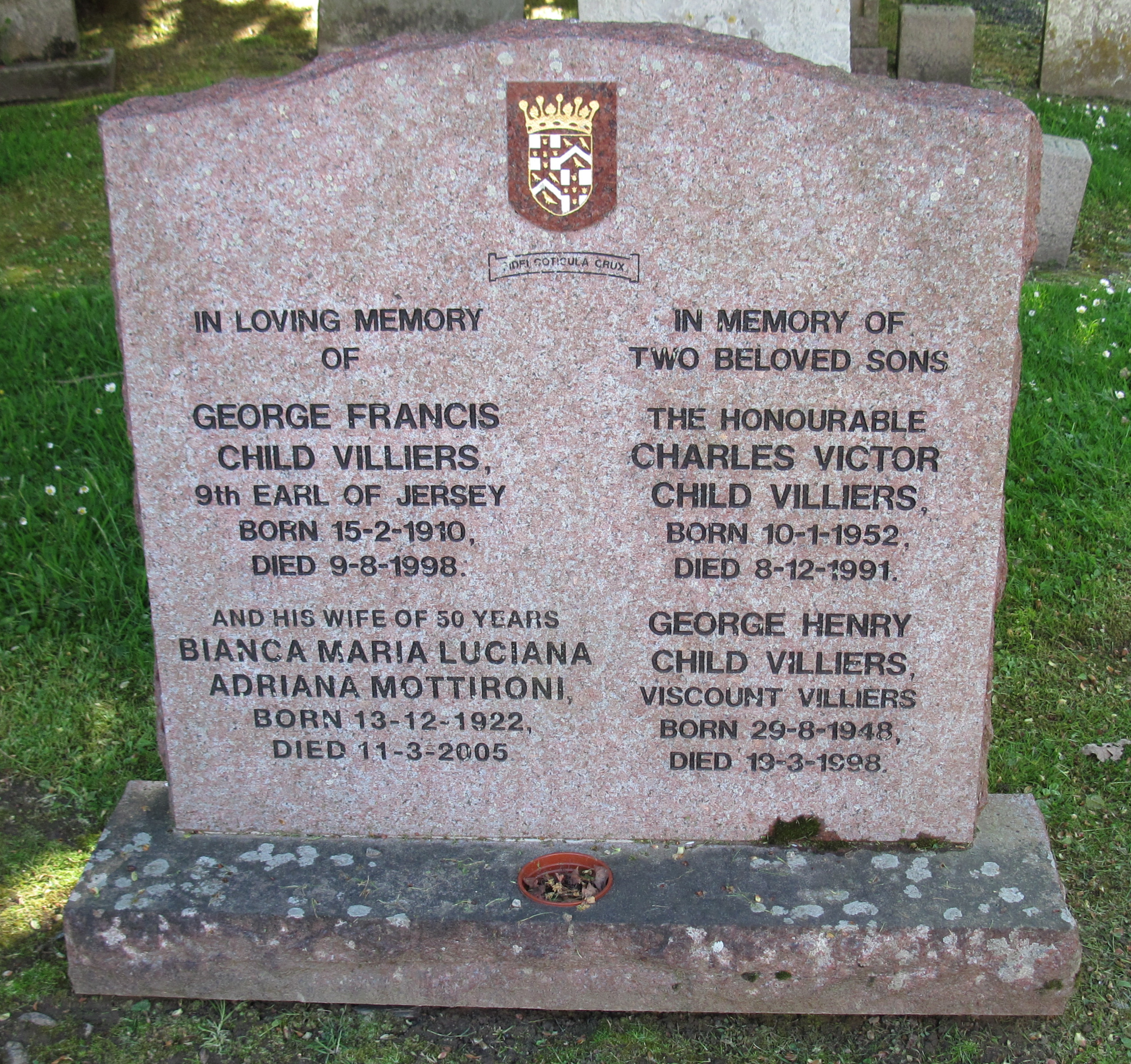
Monument of the 9th Earl of Jersey, showing the family's current arms

Lord Jersey was married three times and twice divorced. He married his first wife, Patricia Richards (1914–2017) at St Margaret's, Westminster, on 12 January 1932. She was the only child of Kenneth Richards, of Cowcumbala, New South Wales, Australia. Before the Countess obtained a divorce from him in London in 1937, they were the parents of one child:

- Lady Caroline Child-Villiers (b. 1934), who married Gilbert Elliot-Murray-Kynynmound, 6th Earl of Minto, in 1952. They divorced in 1965 and she married Hon. John Douglas Stuart (second son of James Stuart, 1st Viscount Stuart of Findhorn), in 1969. They also divorced and she married Hon. James Donald Diarmid Ogilvy (son of David Ogilvy, 12th Earl of Airlie) in 1980.

A week after his divorce was finalized, Lord Jersey married American actress Virginia Cherrill on 30 July 1937 at the Chelsea Register Office. She was the ex-wife of actor Cary Grant and daughter of James E. Cherrill. They divorced in 1946 without having had children together. She later married Florian Martini, a World War II flying ace, before her death in 1996.

His third and last wife was Bianca Luciana Adriana Mottironi (d. 2005), whom he married on 16 October 1947. She was the eldest daughter of furniture maker Enrico Mottironi of Via Goffredo Casalis in Turin, Italy. They had three children:

- George Henry Child Villiers, Viscount Villiers (1948–1998), who married on 22 December 1969 Verna P. Stott; divorced 1973, with children. Married on 9 January 1974 Sacha Jane Hooper Valpy; divorced 1988, with children. Married in 1992 Stephanie Louisa Penman, with children.
- Lady Isabel Bianca Rosa Child-Villiers (b. 1950), married Peter Edward Harrison in 1974.
- Hon. Charles Victor Child-Villiers (1952–1991), married Brigitte Elisabeth Germaine Marchand, in 1975. They divorced in 1989, before he lost his hearing suddenly and died in 1991, aged just 39.

Lord Jersey moved to Radier Manor in Jersey, where he lived with his third wife until his death on 9 August 1998. As his eldest son George died of a heart attack on 19 March 1998, several months before the Earl's death, his grandson, William, succeeded as the 10th Earl. His widow, the dowager Countess of Jersey, died in March 2005.

== Sources ==
- Obituaries for the Dowager Countess of Jersey. The Times 16 March 2005, and The Daily Telegraph 16 March 2005
- Official notice of the Royal Warrant dated 5 June 2000, published 18 September 2000 in the London Gazette for the elevation in rank, style, and precedence of the 10th Earl's three sisters, but not his half-brother.

Peerage of England
Preceded by George Child Villiers	Earl of Jersey; 1923 – 1998	Succeeded by William Child Villiers
