= Lady Pansy Lamb =

British writer and translator

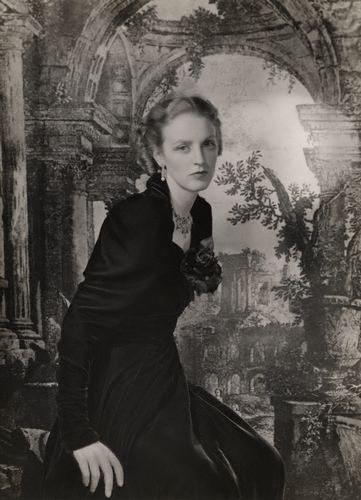
- Born: Lady Margaret Pansy Felicia Pakenham; 18 May 1904
- Died: 19 February 1999 (aged 94); London, England
- Other names: Lady Pansy Lamb; Pansy Pakenham (pen name and maiden name)
- Occupations: Novelist; biographer; translator of French poetry
- Spouse: Henry Lamb (m. 1928; died 1960)
- Children: 3, including Henrietta Phipps and Valentine Lamb
- Parents: Thomas Pakenham, 5th Earl of Longford; Lady Mary Child Villiers
- Relatives: Edward Pakenham, 6th Earl of Longford (brother); Frank Pakenham, 7th Earl of Longford (brother); Lady Violet Powell (sister); Lady Mary Clive (sister); Victor Child Villiers, 7th Earl of Jersey (grandfather)

Lady Margaret Pansy Felicia Lamb, known as Lady Pansy Lamb (18 May 1904 – 19 February 1999), was an English writer under her maiden name of Pansy Pakenham. A novelist, biographer, and translator of French poetry, she was the wife of the Australian-born painter Henry Lamb.

== Early life ==
Lamb was one of four daughters of Thomas Pakenham, 5th Earl of Longford, by his marriage to Lady Mary Child Villiers, a daughter of Victor Child Villiers, 7th Earl of Jersey. The young Pansy did not go to school and claimed to be entirely self-educated. In 1915, when she was eleven, her father was killed in action in the Great War at the Scimitar Hill, part of the disastrous Gallipoli Campaign. Thereafter, Pansy was brought up by her mother with her brothers, Edward and Frank, and her sisters, Violet, Mary, and Julia. In 1922 she was a debutante.

Pansy Pakenham and her siblings had few friends outside their immediate family, which Lady Mary attributed to the out-of-date clothes that they wore as children. Mary's obituary in The Guardian in April 2010 said that the Longford children had had "a fierce independence of spirit and a positive relish for being different". Their childhood Christmases were spent at their mother's ancestral home, Middleton Park at Middleton Stoney in Oxfordshire, and these were recalled in Mary's novel Christmas with the Savages (1955).

== In London ==
Pansy Pakenham's mother was a friend of the widow of Herbert Gardner, 1st Baron Burghclere, who had died in 1921. Unusually, the two women allowed their daughters, Pansy and Evelyn Gardner, to take a flat together in Ebury Street. For a time Pansy worked in an architect's office. The two friends were mixed up in the affairs of the Bright young things, and the novelist Alec Waugh described them as "more than usually pleasant examples of the Modern Girl, emancipated but not brassy." Among their closest friends was Nancy Mitford. In 1928, with Pansy's encouragement, Evelyn Gardner married the older Waugh's novelist brother Evelyn Waugh, but this was not a success. This event was soon followed by Pansy's own marriage in 1928 to the artist Henry Lamb, who was almost twenty years her senior.

== Wiltshire ==
The Lambs set up home in the small Wiltshire village of Coombe Bissett, where they had three children, first two daughters, Henrietta and Felicia, and finally a son, Valentine. They played host to many friends, including John Betjeman, Bryan Guinness, David Cecil, and L. P. Hartley. Betjeman recorded the era in a poem

O the calm of Coombe Bissett is tranquil and deep,
Where Ebble flows soft in her downland asleep;
There beauty to me came a-pushing a pram
In the shape of the sweet Pansy Felicia Lamb.

In 1945, she wrote to her friend Evelyn Waugh, commenting on his new book Brideshead Revisited:

You cannot make me nostalgic about the world I knew in the 1920s. And yet it was the same world that you describe, or at any rate impinged on it. I was a debutante in 1922 and though neither smart nor rich went to three dances in historic houses ... it all seems very dull. You see English Society of the 20s as something baroque and magnificent on its last legs... I fled from it because it seemed prosperous, bourgeois and practical and I believe it still is.

== Writer and notable works ==
In 1928, Pansy Pakenham published a novel, The Old Expedient, and in 1931 another, August, still using her maiden name. In 1936 she produced a biography of King Charles I, for Duckworth. In 1956 came The Mystery of the Holy Innocents and Other Poems, an English translation of a work by Charles Péguy. She published little more until after the death of her husband in 1960, when, settling again in London, she edited a collection of the letters of Dickens.

== Rome ==
A convert to Catholicism, in 1981 Lady Pansy took up residence in a flat in Rome, where she had close friends. She became a guide at St Peter's and was devoted to Pope John Paul II. She died in London in February 1999, at the age of ninety-four.

== Children ==
The Lambs had two daughters, the landscape gardener Henrietta Phipps, and Felicia Palmer, and a son, the journalist Valentine Lamb.
