= William Child Villiers, 10th Earl of Jersey =

English Earl (born 1976)

The Right Honourable The Earl of Jersey

Member of the House of Lords
- Lord Temporal
- In office 9 August 1998 – 11 November 1999 as a hereditary peer
- Preceded by: The 9th Earl of Jersey
- Succeeded by: Seat abolished (Note: Pursuant to the House of Lords Act 1999.)

Personal details
- Born: George Francis William Child Villiers; 5 February 1976 (age 50)
- Spouse: Marianne Simonne de Guelle (m. 2003)
- Children: 4, including Amelie
- Parents: George Child Villiers, Viscount Villiers; Sacha Valpy
- Occupation: Film producer, actor, writer

George Francis William Child Villiers, 10th Earl of Jersey (born 5 February 1976), known professionally as William Villiers, is a British nobleman and peer of the Villiers family. He is a former film producer, actor and writer. He was the Director of Intellectual Property for HandMade Films.

== Education and career ==
William Villiers is the eldest son of George Child Villiers, Viscount Villiers, and his second wife, Sacha (née Valpy), and was educated at St. Michael's School, Jersey, until the age of 8, then Mount House School, Tavistock, Devon; Canford School, Wimborne, Dorset; Nene College (now Northampton University); and Birmingham School of Speech and Drama. On the death of his father on 19 March 1998, he was briefly styled Viscount Grandison (in accordance with the family's tradition whereby heirs apparent are alternately styled Viscount Villiers and Viscount Grandison). He succeeded his grandfather as 10th Earl of Jersey in August of that year and took his seat in the House of Lords in 1999, shortly before the reformation of the House.

== Family seat ==
In 2007, the Earl of Jersey put up for sale the family home, Radier Manor, along with several properties and around 70 acres (28 ha) of land on Jersey with an asking price of £12.5 million. However, the property was later withdrawn from the agents' listings.

== Marriage and issue ==
On 16 August 2003, the Earl of Jersey married Marianne Simonne De Guelle, daughter of Peter De Guelle, in St Martin de Grouville, Jersey. They have four children:

1. Lady Mia Adriana Marie Rose Child Villiers (b. 28 December 2006)
2. Lady Amelie Natasha Sophia Child Villiers (b. 14 April 2008)
3. Lady Evangeline Antonia Adela Child Villiers (b. 9 February 2011)
4. George Henry William Child Villiers, Viscount Villiers (b. 1 September 2015).

He is a second cousin of actor Bart Ruspoli.

== Filmography ==
- The Long Night (2002) (V) .... Geoffrey and also Executive Producer
- Four (2002) (TV) .... Brett and also Writer and Television producer
- London: The Greatest City (2004) (TV) .... Ben Johnsson
- Jack Says (2008) Executive Producer (completed)

== Arms ==
Coat of arms of William Child-Villiers, 10th Earl of Jersey
Crest 1st, A lion rampant argent ducally crowned or; 2nd, On a rock proper, an eagle rising argent ducally gorged or, holding in the beak an adder proper, and charged on the breast, for distinction, with an ermine spot. Escutcheon Quarterly 1st and 4th Argent, on a cross gules five escallops or (Villiers); 2nd and 3rd Gules, a chevron engrailed ermine between three eaglets argent ducally gorged or, and in the chief point for distinction an escallop or (Child). Supporters Two lions argent ducally crowned or and gorged with a plain collar gules charged with three escallops or. Motto Fidei coticula crux (The cross is the test of faith).

== Ancestry ==
Ancestors of William Child Villiers, 10th Earl of Jersey

8. George Child Villiers, 8th Earl of Jersey (1873–1923)
4. George Child Villiers, 9th Earl of Jersey (1910–1998)
9. Lady Cynthia Needham (1889–1947)
2. George Child Villiers, Viscount Villiers (1948–1998)
10. Enrico Mottironi
5. Bianca Maria Luciana Adriana Mottironi (1922–2005)
1. William Child Villiers, 10th Earl of Jersey
12. John Hooper Valpy (1874–1959)
6. Peter Andrew Hooper Valpy (1915–1998)
13. Sophie Marguerite Fauvel (1881–1970)
3. Sandra Jane "Sacha" Hooper Valpy (b. 1955)
14. Edmund John Le Seelleur (1893–1990)
7. Dorothy Iris Le Seelleur (1918–2018)
15. Harriet Eliza Fawkes (1894–1981)

== Notes ==
Peerage of England
Preceded by George Child Villiers	Earl of Jersey; 1998–present Member of the House of Lords (1998–1999)	Incumbent; Heir apparent: George Child Villiers, Viscount Villiers
Orders of precedence in the United Kingdom
Preceded by The Earl of Coventry	Gentlemen; The Earl of Jersey	Followed by The Earl of Crawford
