= Valentine Lamb =

British journalist (1939–2015)

Valentine "Val" Edward Martin Lamb (26 January 1939 – 24 April 2015) was a British journalist who was editor of The Irish Field.

Editor of his magazine for 33 years, from 1970 to 2003, on his death in 2015 an obituary called Lamb “a highly respected figure on the Irish racing and bloodstock scene”.

Valentine Lamb was the son of the artist Henry Lamb and his wife Lady Pansy Pakenham.
