= Colin Campbell (British Army officer, born 1776) =

British Army officer and colonial governor

Lieutenant-General Sir Colin Campbell KCB
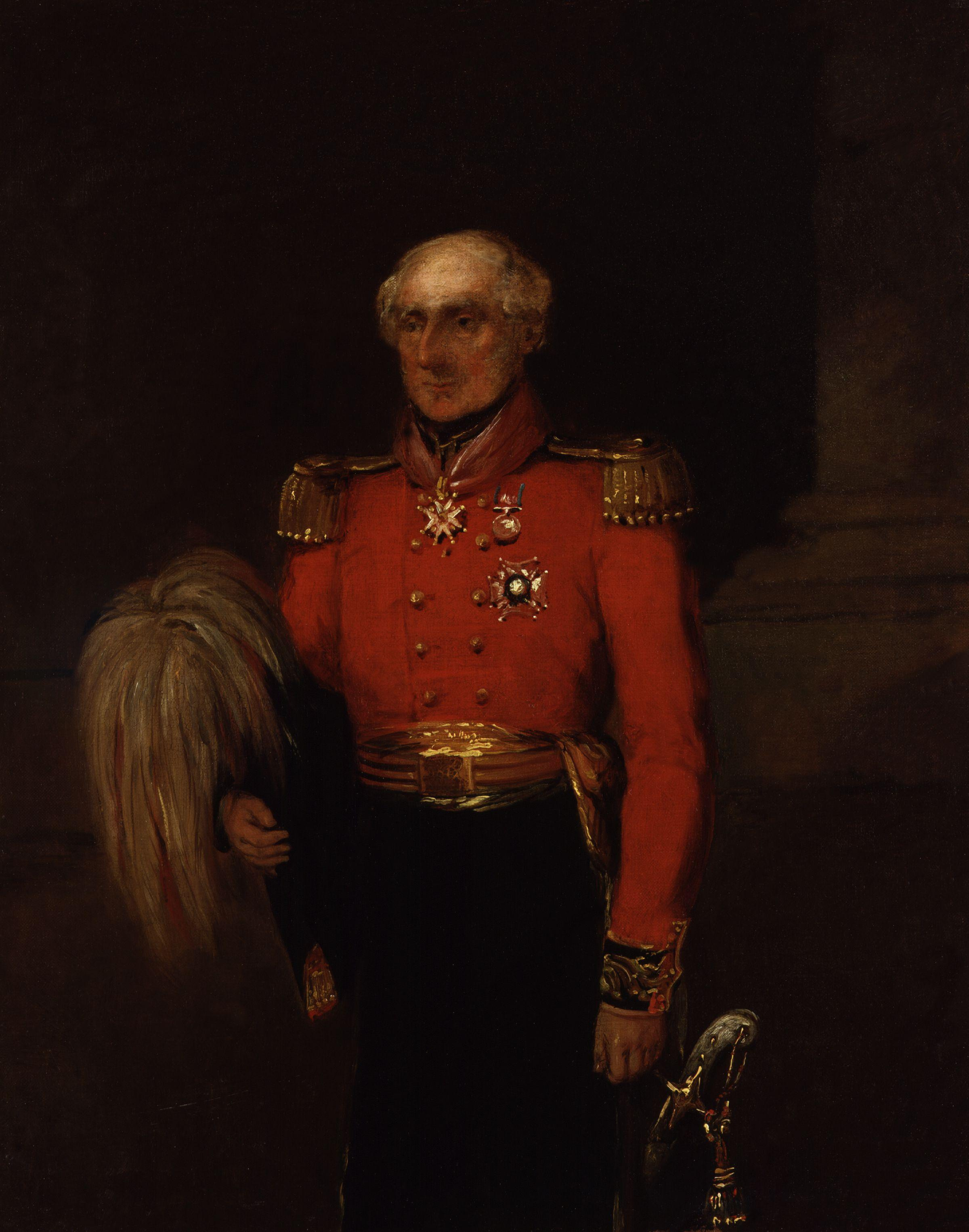
- Sir Colin Campbell by William Salter

8th Governor of British Ceylon
- In office 15 April 1841 – 19 April 1847
- Preceded by: James Alexander Stewart-Mackenzie
- Succeeded by: James Emerson Tennent (Acting governor)

17th General Officer Commanding, Ceylon
- In office 16 April 1841 – 28 January 1847
- Preceded by: Robert Arbuthnot
- Succeeded by: William Smelt

25th Lieutenant-Governor of Nova Scotia
- In office 1834–1840
- Preceded by: Thomas Nickleson Jeffery acting
- Succeeded by: The Viscount Falkland

Personal details
- Born: 18 April 1776
- Died: 13 June 1847 (aged 71)

Military service
- Allegiance: United Kingdom
- Branch/service: British Army
- Rank: Lieutenant-General
- Unit: 78th (Highlanders) Regiment of Foot
- Commands: General Officer Commanding, Ceylon

Lieutenant-General Sir Colin Campbell KCB (18 April 1776 – 13 June 1847) was a British Army officer and colonial governor.

== Military career ==
Campbell was the fifth son of Colonel John Campbell of Melfort and Colina, daughter of John Campbell of Achalader. (Note: His father had served as an officer in the Black Watch and was wounded at the Battle of Ticonderoga. He was subsequently Lieutenant Governor of Fort George (1779–1790). His eldest brother Archibald (died 1823) served in India and South Africa. Three of his other brothers were army officers, killed in India in 1801 and 1803, and his brothers Frederick Campbell (1780–1866) was a general in the Royal Artillery and Patrick Campbell an admiral in the Royal Navy.) He was the triple great-great grandson of Sir Ewen Cameron of Lochiel, through two of his daughters Katherine and Lucia, the latter of whom twice over. From his boyhood Campbell gave evidence of a daring disposition. When he was sixteen, he ran away from the Perth Academy, and entered himself on a ship heading to the West Indies. He was met in the fruit market at Kingston in Jamaica by his brother (afterwards Admiral Sir) Patrick Campbell, then serving on HMS Blonde, who brought him home. His parents yielded to his wishes, and in 1793 he became a midshipman on board an East Indiaman and made one or two voyages.

In February 1795, Campbell became a lieutenant in the 3rd battalion of the Breadalbane Fencibles, then commanded by his uncle, Lieutenant Colonel John Campbell of Achalader. (Note: His mother's eldest brother.) With the Fencibles he saw action in the Irish Rebellion of 1798. On 3 October 1799, he entered a West India regiment as ensign, and in 1800 acted as brigade-major in the island of St. Vincent. On 21 August 1801, he was gazetted a lieutenant in the 35th Foot, and at once exchanged into the 78th Foot (Ross-shire Buffs), which was then stationed in British India. He joined his new regiment at Poona, accompanied Arthur Wellesley in the Second Anglo-Maratha War against the Maharajah Scindia and the Rajah of Nagpore, and so greatly distinguished himself by leading the flank companies at the storming of the Pettah of Ahmednagar on 8 August 1803 that Wellesley at once appointed him brigade-major. In this capacity he served at the Battle of Assaye, where he was severely wounded and had two (or possibly three) horses killed under him, at the Battle of Argaum, and at the storming of Gawilghur.

On leaving India, Wellesley strongly recommended Campbell to his brother, Richard, Lord Wellesley, who made him his aide-de-camp, and to Lord Lake, who, on 9 January 1805, gave him a company in the 75th Highlanders. He returned to England with Lord Wellesley in 1806, and Sir Arthur Wellesley at once asked that he should be appointed brigade-major to his brigade, then stationed at Hastings. As brigade-major he accompanied Wellesley to Hanover and on the Copenhagen Expedition (1807), when his services at the battle of Kioge were conspicuous.

In 1808, Sir Arthur Wellesley appointed Campbell as his senior aide-de-camp, when he took command of the expeditionary force destined for Portugal, and sent him home with the despatches announcing the victory at Roliça on 17 August Campbell, however, windbound and hearing the guns, disembarked, and was present at the Battle of Vimeiro. Sir Harry Burrard then gave him the Vimeiro despatch, and Campbell was promoted a major in the army by brevet on 2 September 1808, and major of the 70th Foot on 15 December 1808. On the same day he was appointed an assistant adjutant-general to a division of the reinforcements intended for the Peninsula. He was present at the passage of the Douro, at the battles of Talavera and Busaco, and was promoted lieutenant-colonel by brevet on 3 May 1810. He was frequently engaged during the pursuit of Marshal Masséna and was present at the Battle of Fuentes de Oñoro and at Salamanca. He obtained the post of assistant quartermaster-general at the headquarters of the army in the Peninsular, at Wellington's special request, in the spring of 1812, and acted in that capacity until the end of the Peninsular War, doing much, it is said, to smooth Wellington's relations with the quartermaster-general, George Murray. He was present at the storming of Badajoz and in ten general actions, for which he received the Peninsular Gold Cross and six clasps.

On 4 June 1814, Campbell was promoted colonel in the army by brevet, and on 25 July made a captain and lieutenant-colonel in the Coldstream Guards. He was also appointed assistant quartermaster-general at the Horse Guards, and made a KCB, and a knight of the Tower and Sword of Portugal. In 1815 he was attached to the staff of the Duke of Wellington, as commandant at headquarters, and was present at the Battle of Waterloo; he held the post throughout Wellington's residence at Paris in the army of occupation, from 1815 to 1818. According to Wellington he was a great soldier but a bad French scholar: "When he wished his dinner to be arranged on the table, he used, as it were, to address the dishes, 'Bif-teck venez içi! Petits pâtes allez là!" Campbell then exchanged his company in the guards for the lieutenant-colonelcy of the 65th Foot, which he held until he was promoted major-general in 1825. He held the command of the southern district for some years.

Campbell became lieutenant-governor of Tobago in 1828 and Lieutenant-Governor of Portsmouth and General Officer Commanding South-West District later that year, and in 1833 was appointed lieutenant-governor of Nova Scotia. In November 1840 he was promoted to the governorship of Ceylon, where he remained from September 1839 to June 1847. It was during his tenure of the latter office that the Duke of Wellington, to whose faithful friendship he owed so much, wrote to him: "We are both growing old; God knows if we shall ever meet again. Happen what may, I shall never forget our first meeting under the walls of Ahmednuggur". He was colonel 99th Foot 1834–1836, and of 72nd Foot 1836 until death. In June 1847 he returned to England, and on 13 June he died, being buried in St. James's Church, Piccadilly. A memorial to him also lies within the church.

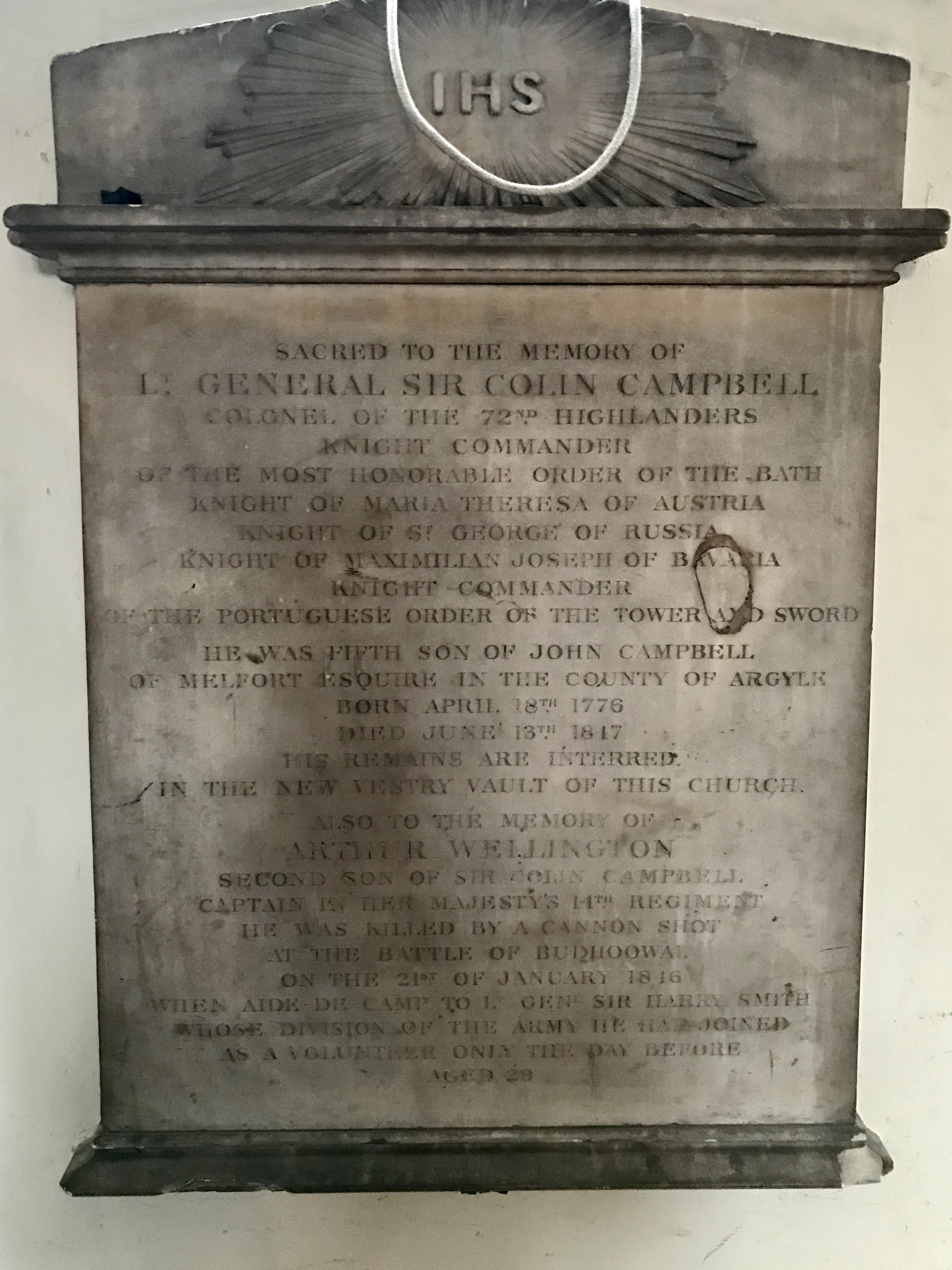
A memorial to Colin Campbell in St James's Church, Piccadilly.

== Honours ==
Campbell was a Knight Commander of the Bath (military) and also a Knight of Saint George of Russia, a Knight of Maximilian Joseph of Bavaria, a Knight Commander of the Portuguese Military Order of the Tower and Sword and a Knight of the Military Order of Maria Theresa of Austria. He held the Waterloo Medal and the Peninsular War's Army Gold Medal with clasps for Talavera, Busaco, Fuentes de Oñoro and Badajoz, with six clasps – for Salamanca, Vitoria, the Pyrenees, Nivelle, Nive and Toulouse. Only Wellington, with nine clasps, Lord Beresford and Sir Denis Pack, with seven each, had more clasps to their medal.

== Family ==
Campbell married Jane Harnden, and they had seven children

- Patrick Fitzroy Wellesley (1808–1875) was a colonel in the army.
- Arthur Wellington (1815–1846), was killed at the Battle of Badhowal Fort in the First Sikh War.
- Frederick Archibald (1817–1874), was a vice-admiral in the Royal Navy.
- Maria Louisa, married secondly (1838), the Hon. Edmund Phipps, son of Henry Phipps, 1st Earl of Mulgrave, and was the mother of ambassador Sir Constantine Phipps, father of ambassador Sir Eric Phipps. Her first husband was the Hon. Charles Francis Norton, died 1835, buried in Old Burying Ground (Halifax, Nova Scotia). She died in 1888.

== Ancestry ==
Ancestors of Colin Campbell (British Army officer, born 1776)

16. Dr Dugald Campbell of Melfort (−1708)
8. John Campbell of Melfort (−1718)
17. Isabella, daughter of Duncan Campbell of Jura
4. Archibald Campbell of Melfort (−1773)
18. Lachlan Maclachlan of Maclachlan (-c1719)
9. Anne Maclachlan (1672-?)
19. Janet, daughter of Hugh Wallace of Inglistee
2. John Campbell of Melfort (1749–90)
20. Alexander Campbell of Barcaldine (1648–1720)
10. Patrick Campbell of Barcaldine (1677–1738)
21. Mary, daughter of Colin Campbell of Lochnell
5. Annabel Campbell (1711-?)
22. Sir Ewen Cameron of Lochiel (1629–1719)
11. Lucia Cameron (1692-?)
23. Jean, daughter of Colonel David Barclay
1. Sir Colin Campbell
24. Allister Campbell of Achalader
12. John Campbell of Achalader (1690–1746)
25. Agnes, daughter of John MacNab of Borane
6. John Campbell of Achalader (1715–91)
26. Sir Ewen Cameron of Lochiel (1629–1719)
13. Katharine Cameron (1693-?)
27. Jean, daughter of David Barclay of Mathers & Urie
3. Colina Campbell (1754–1802)
28. Alexander Campbell of Barcaldine (1648–1720)
14. Patrick Campbell of Barcaldine (1677–1738)
29. Mary, daughter of Colin Campbell of Lochnell
7. Isabella Campbell
30. Sir Ewen Cameron of Lochiel (1629–1719)
15. Lucia Cameron (1692-?)
31. Jean, daughter of David Barclay of Mathers & Urie

== Portraits ==
Campbell can be seen in three works at the National Portrait Gallery: a pencil and watercolour sketch by Thomas Heaphy (1803), an oil on canvas by William Salter (c1834), and in the group Field Marshal the Duke of Wellington KG &c &c Giving Orders to his Generals Previous to a General Action by Thomas Heaphy (1822). Drawings of him are also in the British Museum and the Scottish National Portrait Gallery, and he can be seen in William Salter's group portrait Waterloo banquet at Apsley House, in the Wellington Museum.

== In popular culture ==
Campbell's storming of the walls at Ahmednuggur forms an episode in Bernard Cornwell's novel Sharpe's Triumph.

== Notes ==
Military offices
Preceded by Sir James Lyon	GOC South-West District; 1828–1834	Succeeded by Sir Thomas McMahon
Government offices
Preceded by Thomas Nickleson Jeffery (acting)	Lieutenant-Governor of Nova Scotia; 1834–1840	Succeeded by The Viscount Falkland
Preceded by James A Stewart-Mackenzie	Governor of Ceylon; 1841–1847	Succeeded by James Emerson Tennent acting governor'
Military offices
Preceded by Robert Arbuthnot	General Officer Commanding, Ceylon; 1841–1847	Succeeded by William Smelt
