= Christine Longford =

Irish playwright

The Right Honourable The Countess of Longford
- Born: Christine Patti Trew; 6 September 1900; Somerset
- Died: 14 May 1980 (aged 79); Dublin, Ireland
- Resting place: Mount Jerome Cemetery, Dublin
- Known for: Plays, books on theatre
- Spouse: Edward Pakenham, 6th Earl of Longford
- Relatives: Rachel Billington (niece)

Christine Pakenham, Countess of Longford (née Trew; 6 September 1900 – 14 May 1980) was a playwright. Following her parents' separation her mother took in lodgers while Christine attended Oxford Wells High School. She won a scholarship to study classics at Somerville College, Oxford. While there she met and in 1925 married Edward Pakenham, 6th Earl of Longford. She moved to Ireland with her husband in 1925. They divided their time between Dublin and Pakenham Hall, now Tullynally Castle, in Castlepollard, County Westmeath.

In 1930, Christine Longford and her husband bought shares in The Dublin Gate Theatre Company. In addition to designing costumes and managing productions Christine wrote plays including Lord Edward and Patrick Sarsfield. She also adapted novels for the stage, Jane Austen's Pride and Prejudice among them. The company suffered when the Longfords withdrew their backing.

Her books include A Biography of Dublin, published as part of the Biographies of Cities series, Country Places, published by Parkside Press Dublin and Making Conversation, republished by Persephone Books in 2009.

She figures extensively in two books: No Profit but the Name: the Longfords and the Gate Theatre and The Boys: a double biography.

== Bibliography ==
- Longford, Christine. Vespasian and Some of his Contemporaries. Hodges and Figgis, 1928.
- Longford, Christine. Making Conversation, 1931. (Reprinted, Persephone Books, 2009.) Preface by Rachel Billington
- Longford, Christine. Country Places. Parkside Press, Dublin, 1932.
- Longford, Christine., and the Earl of Longford. The Oresteia (trans.), Hodges and Figgis, 1933.
- Longford, Christine. Mr. Jiggins of Jigginstown. Gollancz, 1933.
- Longford, Christine. Printed Cotton. Methuen, 1935.
- Longford, Christine. A Biography of Dublin. Methuen, 1936.
- Longford, Christine. Lord Edward. Methuen, 1940.
- Longford, Christine. The United Brothers. Hodges and Figgis, 1942.
- Longford, Christine. Patrick Sarsfield. Hodges and Figgis, 1943.
- Longford, Christine. The Earl of Straw. Hodges and Figgis, 1944.
- Le Fanu, J. Sheridan. Uncle Silas (Specially edited by Christine Longford). Penguin, 1947.
- Longford, Christine. Tarkardstown, or A Lot to be Thankful For. P.J. Bourke, 1948.
- Longford, Christine. Mr. Supple. P.J. Bourke, 1949.
- Longford, Christine. Hill of Quirke. P.J. Bourke, 1958.
- Quinn, Kathleen A. (1997). Schrank, B.; Demastes, W.W. (eds.). Irish Playwrights 1880-1995. CT: Greenwood Press.
