= Constantine Phipps (diplomat) =

British diplomat (1840–1911)

Sir Constantine Phipps KCMG, CB

British Ambassador to Belgium
- In office 1900–1906
- Preceded by: Sir Edmund Monson
- Succeeded by: Sir Arthur Hardinge

British Ambassador to Brazil
- In office 1894–1900
- Preceded by: Hugh Wyndham
- Succeeded by: Sir Henry Dering

Personal details
- Born: Edmund Constantine Henry Phipps; 15 March 1840
- Died: 15 March 1911 (aged 71)
- Spouse(s): Maria Jane Miller Mundy (m. 1863; died 1902) Alexandra Wassilewna Brandão (m. 1904; died 1911)
- Relations: Henry Phipps, 1st Earl of Mulgrave (grandfather); Sir Colin Campbell (grandfather)
- Parent(s): Hon. Edmund Phipps; Maria-Louisa Campbell
- Education: Harrow School

Sir Edmund Constantine Henry Phipps, KCMG, CB (15 March 1840 – 15 March 1911) was a British diplomat.

== Early life ==
Constantine Phipps was the only son of the lawyer and author Hon. Edmund Phipps and Maria-Louisa (née Campbell) Phipps. His mother was previously married to Hon. Charles Francis Norton, an MP for Guildford.

His paternal grandparents were Henry Phipps, 1st Earl of Mulgrave and Martha Sophia Maling (a daughter of pottery manufacturer Christopher Thomson Maling). His maternal grandfather was Lt.-Gen. Sir Colin Campbell.

Phipps was educated at Harrow School and later entered the Diplomatic Service in 1858.

== Career ==
In 1873, he was Third Secretary in Rio de Janeiro and was requested by the Ambassador, George Buckley Mathew, to report on the condition of British emigrants in Brazil.

In 1881, Phipps was promoted from the rank of Second Secretary to be Consul-General at Budapest with the rank of Secretary of Legation, and in 1885 was posted to be Secretary of the Embassy at Vienna. In 1892 he was appointed Secretary of the Embassy at Paris and in the following year promoted to be Minister Plenipotentiary under the Ambassador to France, the Marquess of Dufferin and Ava.

While in Paris, Phipps was a British delegate to an international conference on the prevention of cholera, in 1894. He was made a Companion of the Bath in the Queen's 1894 Birthday Honours. In the same year he was appointed British Ambassador to Brazil.

In 1900 Phipps was appointed Envoy Extraordinary and Minister Plenipotentiary at the Court of His Majesty the King of the Belgians. He was knighted as a Knight Commander of the Order of St Michael and St George (KCMG) in the 1902 Coronation Honours list "for services in connection with the Sugar Conference", and invested as such by King Edward VII at Buckingham Palace on 24 October 1902. This was the Brussels Sugar Convention of 5 March 1902, which was controversial in Britain and was opposed by Henry Campbell-Bannerman amongst others. Phipps retired from the Diplomatic Service in 1906 and died in 1911.

== Personal life ==
In 1863, he married Maria Miller Mundy, daughter of Alfred Miller Mundy, of Shipley Hall, Derbyshire, and Maria Jane Hindmarsh (a daughter of Rear-Admiral Sir John Hindmarsh). Together, they were the parents of:

- Sir Eric Phipps, who became a diplomat in his turn, serving in the 1930s as Ambassador successively to Berlin and Paris.

After the death of Lady Phipps on 30 August 1902, he married Alexandra Wassilewna, widow of Gomez Brandão of Rio de Janeiro, in 1904. He died in 1911 and his widow died in 1954.

Diplomatic posts
Preceded by Hugh Wyndham	Envoy Extraordinary and Minister Plenipotentiary to the United States of Brazil; 1894–1900	Succeeded by Sir Henry Dering
Preceded by Sir Edmund Monson	Envoy Extraordinary and Minister Plenipotentiary at the Court of His Majesty the King of the Belgians; 1900–1906	Succeeded by Sir Arthur Hardinge
