= Margaret Child Villiers, Countess of Jersey =

English political hostess and philanthropist (1849–1945)

The Right Honourable The Countess of Jersey DBE JP
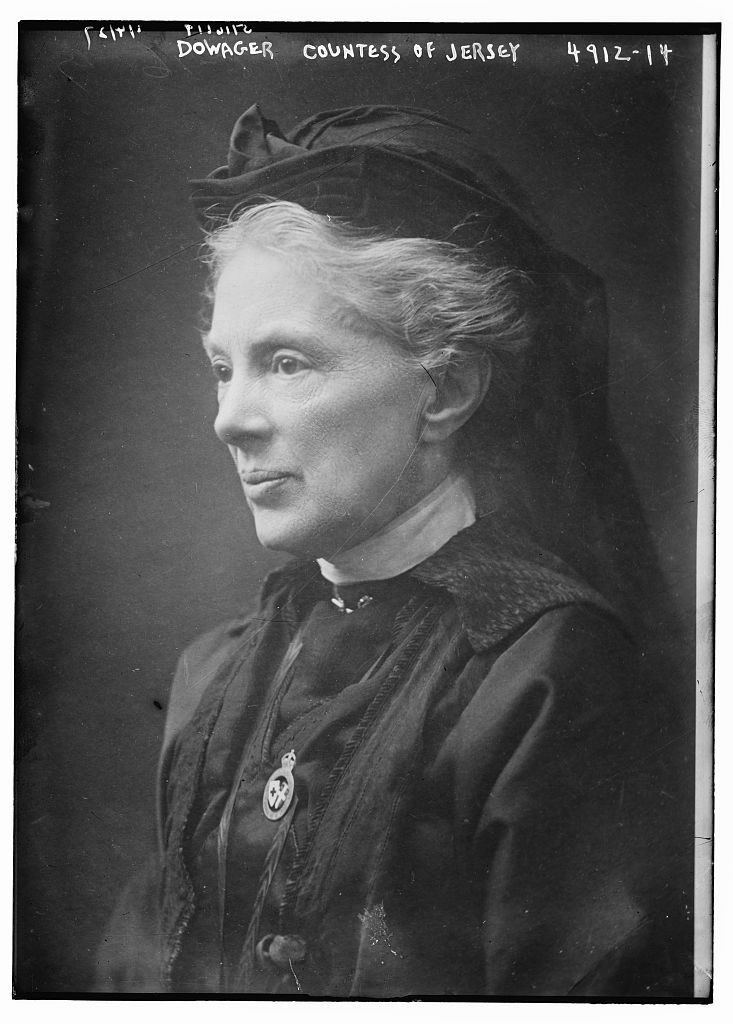
- Born: Margaret Elizabeth Leigh; 29 October 1849
- Died: 22 May 1945 (aged 95)
- Spouse: Victor Child Villiers, 7th Earl of Jersey (m. 1872; died 1915)
- Issue: 6, including George Henry Robert Child Villiers, 8th Earl of Jersey
- Father: William Henry Leigh, 2nd Baron Leigh

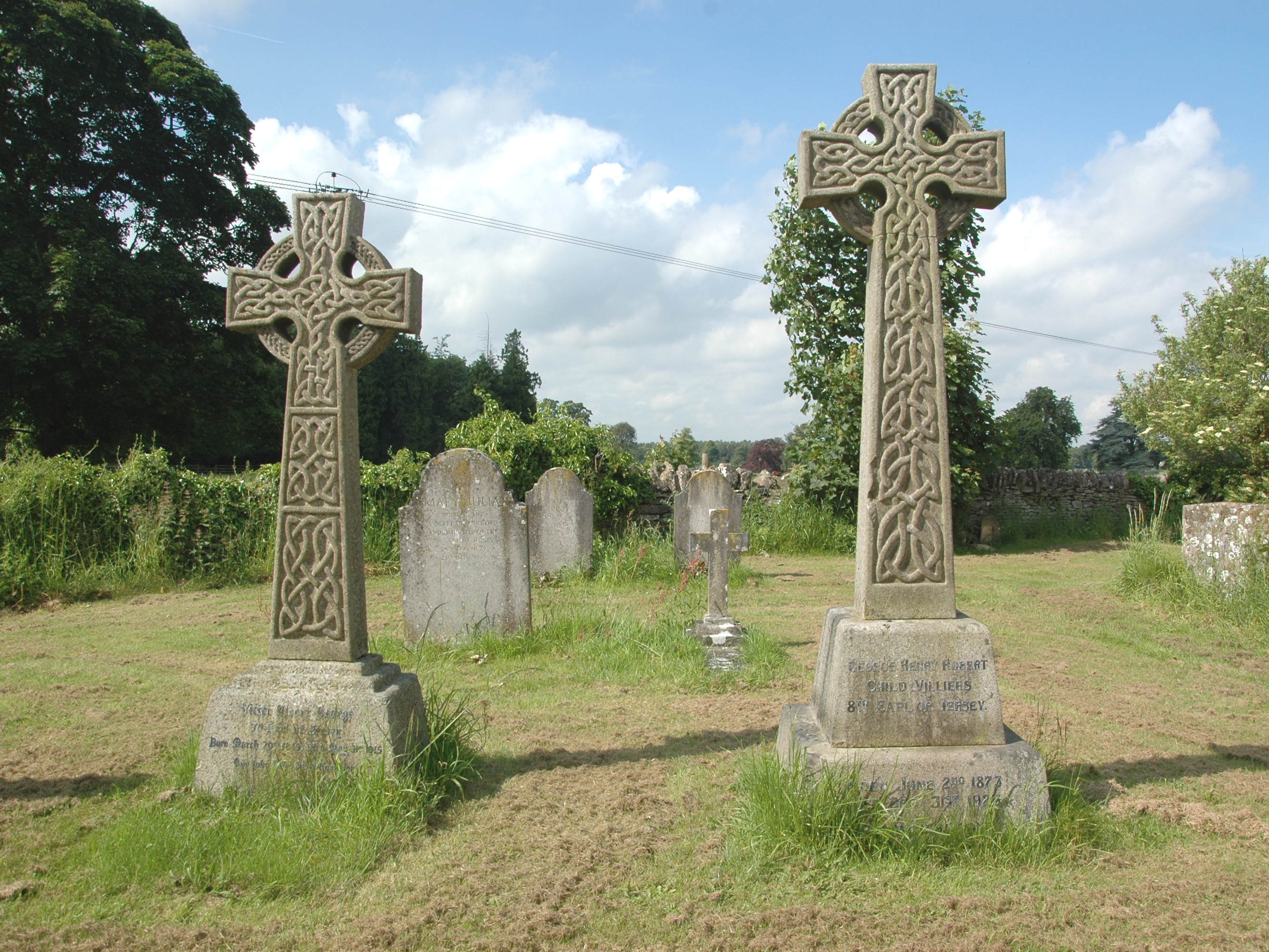
Graves of the 7th (left) and 8th (right) Earls of Jersey in All Saints' parish churchyard, Middleton Stoney, Oxfordshire - Margaret is buried with her husband.

Margaret Elizabeth Child Villiers, Countess of Jersey, DBE, JP (née Leigh; 29 October 1849 – 22 May 1945), was an English noblewoman, activist, writer and hymn-writer.

== Early life ==
Born Margaret Elizabeth Leigh, she was the daughter and eldest child of William Henry Leigh, 2nd Baron Leigh.

== Charitable work and opposition to women's suffrage ==
She was the founding president (1901–1914) of the Victoria League and was known as an opponent of women's suffrage.

In 1903, she laid the foundation stone of Brentford Library, and five years later she formally opened Hove Library.

== Writings ==
She was the author of travel articles, children's plays, verse and hymns. In 1871, the Religious Tract Society published a small collection of her hymns and poems under the title of Hymns and Poems for very Little Children. A second series under the same title appeared in 1875. Six of these hymns were included in W. R. Stevenson's School Hymnal, 1880. Some of these are also included in The Voice of Praise: for Sunday School and home (London S. S. Union) and other collections.

In 1920, she published A brief history of Osterley Park (her husband's seat) and in 1922 Fifty-One Years of Victorian Life.

== Honours ==
She was appointed Dame Commander of the Order of the British Empire (DBE) in 1927.

== Later life and death ==
Having suffered a stroke in 1909, her husband Lord Jersey, died at Osterley Park, Middlesex, in May 1915, aged 70. She survived her husband by 30 years and died at Middleton Park, Oxfordshire, in May 1945, aged 95.

== Family ==
On 19 September 1872, she married Victor Child Villiers, 7th Earl of Jersey. They had six children:

- George Henry Robert Child Villiers, 8th Earl of Jersey (1873–1923)
- Lady Margaret Child Villiers (1874–1874), died in infancy.
- Lady Margaret Child Villiers (1875–1959), married Walter Rice, 7th Baron Dynevor, and had issue.
- Lady Mary Julia Child Villiers (1877–1933), married Thomas Pakenham, 5th Earl of Longford, and had issue.
- Lady Beatrice Child Villiers (1880–1970), married Edward Plunkett, 18th Baron of Dunsany, and had issue.
- Hon. Arthur George Child Villiers (1883–1969)
