= Henrietta Phipps =

British landscape gardener

Henrietta Frances Phipps (née Lamb, 9 December 1931 – 27 May 2016) was a British landscape gardener. Phipps worked for the Royal Borough of Kensington and Chelsea for many years and "shaped the look of the royal borough".

== Early life ==
Phipps was born in Paddington, London, on 9 December 1931, the eldest of the three children of the artist Henry Lamb and the writer Lady Pansy Pakenham. She grew up in the village of Coombe Bissett, three miles southwest of Salisbury, and was educated at Somerville College, Oxford.

She appeared in many of her father’s paintings and helped to market his work.

== Career ==
After graduating from Oxford, Phipps got her first job working for the writer Peter Quennell at History Today. She later took up landscape gardening and worked for the Kensington and Chelsea Council, landscaping many of its public open spaces.

Phipps was a long-standing member of the Ladbroke Square Gardens Committee. She gave guided tours of the communal gardens and wrote articles about them.

== Personal life ==
Phipps married the silversmith William Phipps in 1960. He was the son of Sir Eric Phipps, the British ambassador to Germany from 1933 to 1937 and ambassador to France from 1937 to 1939. She met her future husband when her father was painting a portrait of Eric Phipps.

The Phippses had three sons and a daughter.
