= Edmund Phipps =

Hon. Edmund Phipps (7 December 1808 – 28 October 1857) was a lawyer and author.

== Career ==
Phipps was the third son of Henry Phipps, 1st Earl of Mulgrave and graduated from Trinity College, Oxford in 1828. In 1832 he was called to the bar at the Inner Temple, subsequently practicing law on the northern circuit before being appointed Recorder of Scarborough and later of Doncaster.

== Literary works ==
In 1850 he published Memoirs of the Political and Literary Life of Robert Plumer Ward. Ward's first wife was Phipps' aunt.

- A Few Words on the Three Amateur Budgets of Cobden, Maggregor, and Wason, James Ridgway, London, 1849
- King René's Daughter: "a Danish Lyric Drama. By Henrik Herz. Rendered into English Verse, and illustrated by an Historical Sketch of the Fortunes and Misfortunes of Good King René", Richard Bentley, London, 1848
- The History of a £1000 Note or, Railway Ruin Reviewed, The New Monthly, 1848
- Cabet's Voyage en Icare, Quarterly Review, 1848
- The late census, Edinburgh Review, 1845

== Personal life ==
On 15 May 1838, he married Maria Louisa, widow of the Hon Charles Francis Norton, daughter of Lieutenant-General Sir Colin Campbell. They had an only child, Constantine, subsequently a diplomat.
