= Gate Theatre =

Theatre in Dublin, Ireland

- Amharclann an Gheata

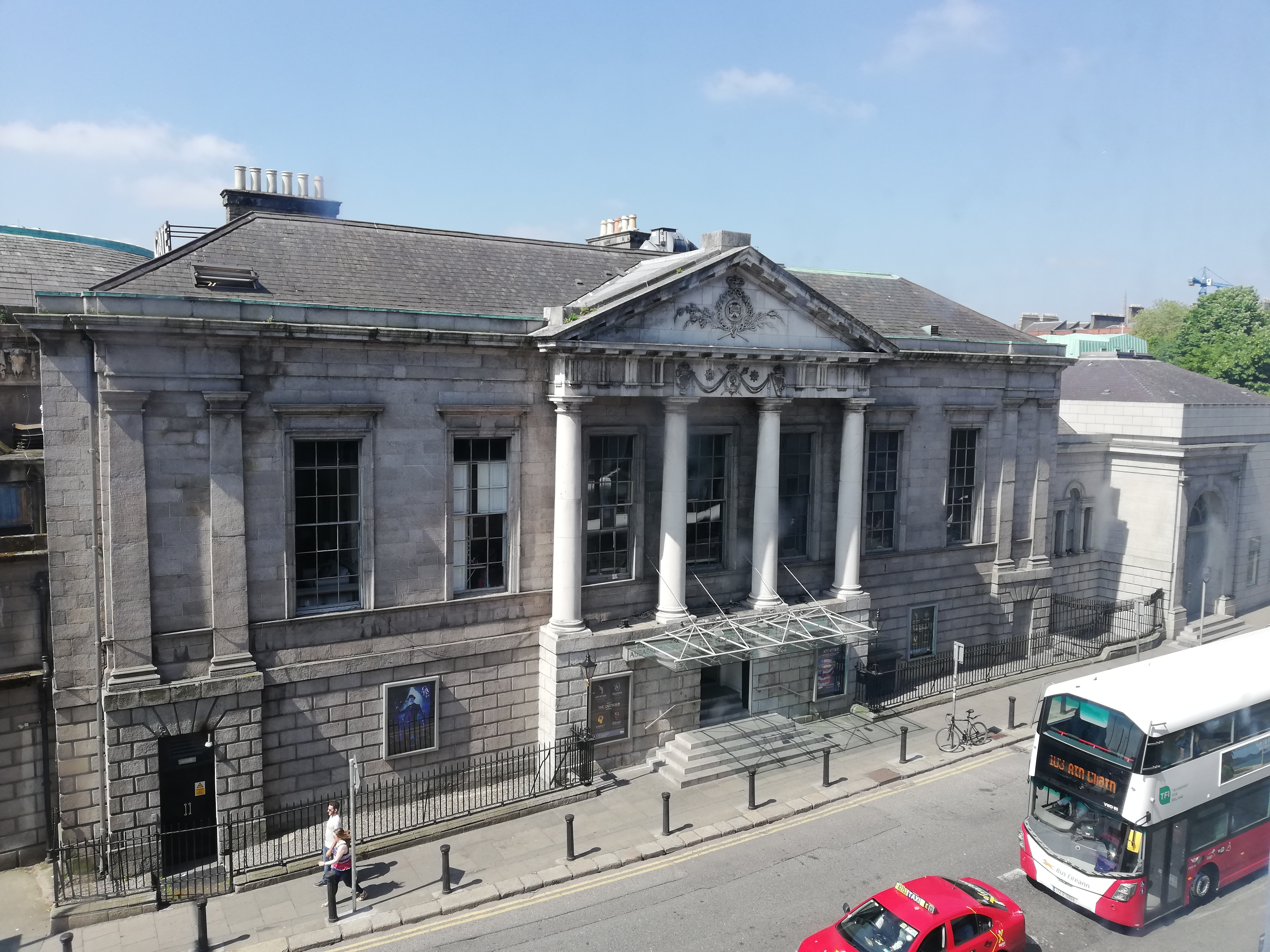

- Location within Central Dublin
- Former names: Dublin Gate Theatre
- Address: 1 Cavendish Row, Dublin, Ireland
- Coordinates: 53°21′11″N 6°15′44″W
- Owner: The Gate Theatre Trust
- Capacity: 371
- Public transit: Connolly station Luas Green Line: O'Connell Street Upper / Parnell

Construction
- Opened: 1928

The Gate Theatre is a theatre on Cavendish Row in Dublin, Ireland. It was founded in 1928.

== History ==
The theatre was originally built as part of the New Assembly Rooms from 1784 to 1786 about a decade after the construction of the original assembly rooms and rotunda (now the Ambassador Theatre).

=== Beginnings ===
The Gate Theatre was founded in 1928 by Hilton Edwards and Micheál MacLiammóir with Daisy Bannard Cogley and Gearóid Ó Lochlainn. During their first season, they presented seven plays, including Ibsen's Peer Gynt, O’Neill's The Hairy Ape and Wilde's Salomé. They offered Dublin audiences an introduction to the world of European and American theatre as well as classics from the modern and Irish repertoire. It was at the Gate that Orson Welles, James Mason, Geraldine Fitzgerald and Michael Gambon began their acting careers.

The company played for two seasons at the Peacock Theatre and then moved to the 18th Century Rotunda Annex - the ‘Upper Concert Hall’, the Gate's present home, with Goethe's Faust opening on 17 February 1930.

=== Lord and Lady Longford ===
The newly established Gate Theatre ran into financial difficulties and a meeting was called on 12 December 1930 to announce its closure. In a surprise announcement, Lord Longford offered to buy up the remaining shares, valued at £1,200 and the theatre was saved. Longford and his wife Lady (Christine) Longford worked with Edwards and MacLiammóir at the Gate until 1936, when a split occurred and two separate companies were formed which played at the Gate for six months each. The companies also toured for six months until the death of Lord Longford in 1961.

During this period Edwards and MacLiammóir (Gate Theatre Productions) performed in Dublin's Gaiety Theatre and toured productions to Europe, Egypt and North America.

=== 1980s–2000s ===
From the 1980s onwards the Gate, under the directorship of Michael Colgan, cemented its international relationship, touring plays around the world for audiences from Beijing to New York. The theatre established relationships with contemporary playwrights including Samuel Beckett, Harold Pinter and Brian Friel. In 1991 the first-ever Beckett Festival was produced, presenting all 19 stage plays over three weeks. The first-ever festival of Pinter's plays followed, along with many premieres and productions of Friel's work including the production of Faith Healer with Ralph Fiennes which won a Tony Award on Broadway. Among other firsts was the production of Chekhov's Three Sisters in a new version by Frank McGuinness with three real sisters, the award-winning Sinéad, Sorcha and Niamh Cusack. The production also featured the veteran star of Irish theatre and father of the three actresses, Cyril Cusack and the Oscar-nominated actress Lesley Manville. The production opened in March 1990 and transferred to the Royal Court Theatre in London later that year.

With the support of funders, the fabric of the building was restored and renovated under the guidance of Ronnie Tallon and Scott, Tallon Walker Architects. This included the provision of a new wing, which incorporated a studio space – The Gate Studio – for rehearsals and workshops.

In 2017, Selina Cartmell was appointed artistic director and chief executive of the Gate Theatre. She stepped down after completing a five-year term. During her time at the Gate, she premiered 11 productions, including 7 Irish works of contemporary writing.

== Wheelchair accessibility ==
The Gate Theatre is housed in a late-18th-century building that was not originally designed for wheelchair access. It was not designed with wheelchair access as a priority. There is a wheelchair lift at the back of the building.
