= Henry Lamb =

English painter (1883–1960)

Henry Lamb MC RA
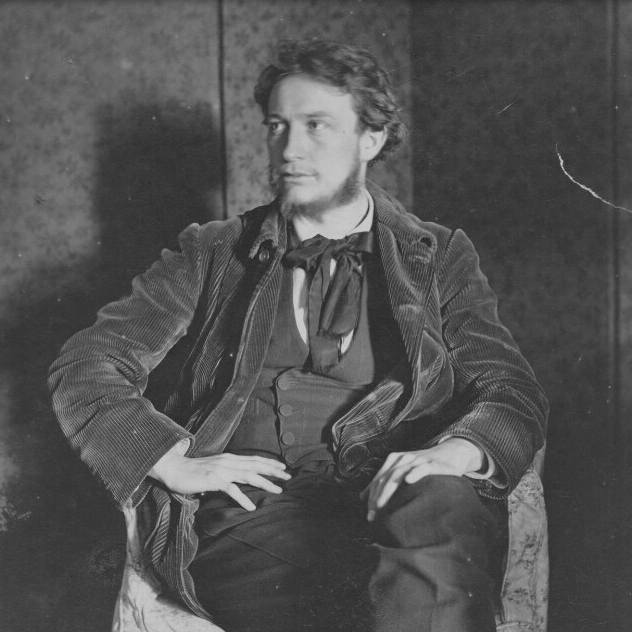
- Born: Henry Taylor Lamb; 21 June 1883; Adelaide, Australia
- Died: 8 October 1960 (aged 77); Salisbury, Wiltshire, England
- Education: Manchester University Medical School; Guy's Hospital; Chelsea Art School; Académie de La Palette
- Known for: Painting, drawing
- Notable work: Irish Troops in the Judaean Hills Surprised by a Turkish Bombardment
- Movement: London Group, Camden Town Group
- Spouse: Lady Pansy Pakenham (m. 1928)
- Children: 3, including Henrietta Phipps and Valentine Lamb
- Awards: Military Cross

Henry Taylor Lamb MC RA (21 June 1883 – 8 October 1960) was an Australian-born British painter. A follower of Augustus John, Lamb was a founder member of the Camden Town Group in 1911 and of the London Group in 1913.

== Early life ==
Henry Lamb was born in Adelaide, South Australia on 21 June 1883, the son of Sir Horace Lamb FRS, who was the professor of mathematics at Adelaide University. When Horace Lamb was appointed to the Chair of Mathematics at the Victoria University of Manchester in 1885 the family moved back to England. Henry Lamb was educated at Manchester Grammar School, before studying medicine at Manchester University Medical School and Guy's Hospital in London, but he abandoned medicine in 1906 to study painting at the Chelsea School of Art, then run by William Orpen and Augustus John. In 1907, Lamb studied at the Académie de La Palette in Paris, an art academy where the painters Jean Metzinger, André Dunoyer de Segonzac and Henri Le Fauconnier taught.

Lamb met his future wife Nina Forrest in 1905 during the final term of his medical studies in Manchester and they ran away to London together that summer. A popular story is that Lamb nicknamed her "Euphemia" because of an apparent resemblance to Mantegna's portrait of Saint Euphemia; it was however her middle name. They were married in May 1906 when she became pregnant but she lost the baby due to a miscarriage. The relationship was short-lived, but they did not divorce until 1927 shortly before Henry married Pansy Pakenham.

In 1908, 1910 and 1911 Lamb worked in Brittany, where he painted his most famous work, Death of a Peasant.

== World War One ==
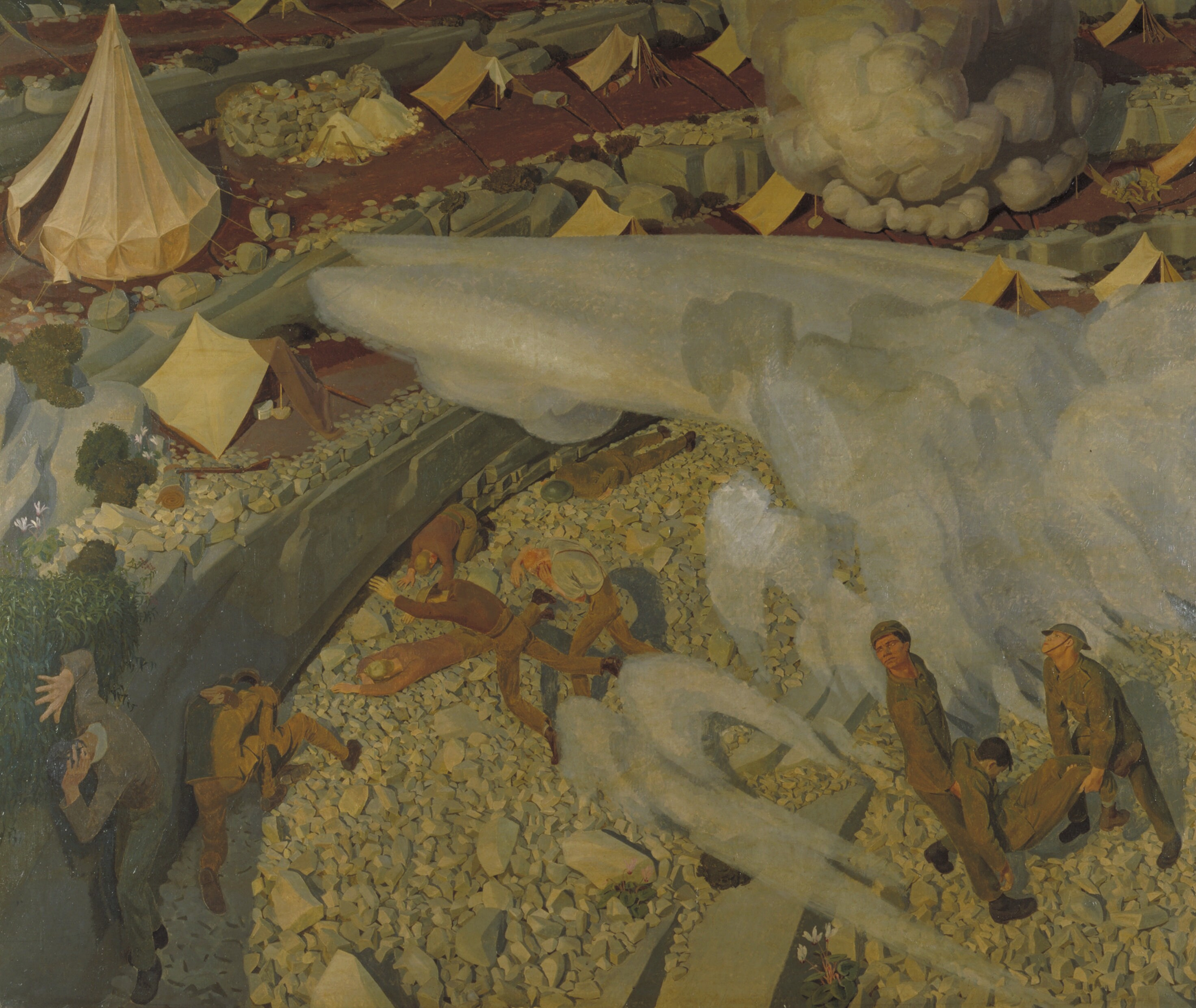
Irish Troops in the Judaean Hills Surprised by a Turkish Bombardment (1919), (Art.IWM ART 2746)

At the start of World War One, Lamb returned to his medical studies and qualified as a doctor at Guy's Hospital. Lamb saw active service in the First World War in the Royal Army Medical Corps as a battalion medical officer with the 5th Battalion, The Royal Inniskilling Fusiliers and was awarded the Military Cross. Lamb served in Palestine and on the Western Front and was badly gassed not long before the end of the war. In February 1918, before he was demobilised, Lamb was approached by British War Memorials Committee of the Ministry of Information to produce a large painting for a proposed national Hall of Remembrance. After he was demobilised in March 1919, Lamb began work on the painting, Irish Troops in the Judaean Hills Surprised by a Turkish Bombardment, which is now in the Imperial War Museum.

== World War Two ==
After the war Lamb settled in Poole, Dorset, where he remained for a number of years. In December 1940, he was appointed a full-time war artist to the War Office by the War Artists' Advisory Committee and throughout the war was to produce a large number of portraits and figure paintings. As well as portraits of high-ranking commanders, Lamb painted servicemen and women, operations at Old Sarum aerodrome and tank training exercises. Throughout the winter of 1941, he was attached to the 12th Canadian Army Tank Battalion, then training in southern England, before doing a series of Auxiliary Territorial Service and Anti-Aircraft Command personnel portraits. The Imperial War Museum held an exhibition of Lamb's wartime work in 1958, and again in 1961.

== Recognition ==
Death of a peasant, 1911, oil on canvas, 485 × 420 mm, Te Papa

Lamb is noted for his unusual portraits, as exemplified by his well-known picture of an elongated Lytton Strachey. He was elected an Associate of the Royal Academy in 1940 and was made a full Member in 1949. He was a Trustee of the National Portrait Gallery from 1942 and of the Tate Gallery from 1944 to 1951. His auction record was set at Christie's in London in June 2006 when his 1910 Breton Boy oil on panel fetched £60,000. As well as the Imperial War Museum, works by Lamb are held in regional museums throughout Britain, in the British Government Art Collection and in the National Gallery of Canada, which received the majority of Lamb's portraits of Canadian troops at the end of World War Two.

== Personal life ==
Lamb married Lady Pansy Pakenham, a daughter of the 5th Earl of Longford, in 1928, and they had a son and two daughters, including the landscape gardener Henrietta Phipps, and the journalist Valentine Lamb. Lamb was a friend of Lady Ottoline Morrell. He died on 8 October 1960 at the Spire Nursing Home in Salisbury, Wiltshire at the age of 77.

The character and appearance of the composer Lewis Dodd in Margaret Kennedy's The Constant Nymph was based on Lamb, who was a gifted pianist. Kennedy's cousin George was one of Lamb's oldest friends.

Lamb's siblings included the classicist Walter Lamb and the archaeologist Dorothy Lamb. His nephew was the climatologist Hubert Lamb and his great-nephew was the Liberal Democrat politician Norman Lamb.

== References and sources ==
Sources

- Clements, Keith (1985) Henry Lamb: the Artist and his Friends
- Stanford Family Ghosts
