= George Child Villiers, 8th Earl of Jersey =

British peer and Conservative politician (1873–1923)

The Right Honourable The Earl of Jersey DL
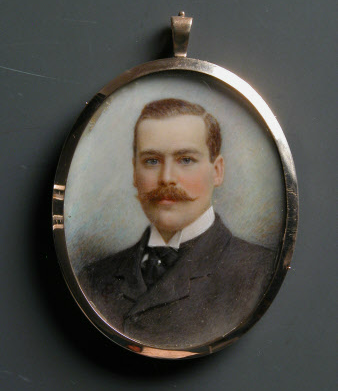
- Born: George Child Villiers; 2 June 1873
- Died: 31 December 1923 (aged 50)
- Spouse: Lady Cynthia Needham (m. 1908)
- Children: George Child Villiers, 9th Earl of Jersey; Lady Joan Colville; Mansel Child Villiers; Lady Ann Elliot
- Parent(s): Victor Child Villiers, 7th Earl of Jersey; Margaret Leigh

George Henry Robert Child Villiers, 8th Earl of Jersey DL (2 June 1873 – 31 December 1923), was a British peer and Conservative politician from the Villiers family.

Villiers was the son of Victor Child Villiers, 7th Earl of Jersey, and the Honourable Margaret Elizabeth, daughter of William Henry Leigh, 2nd Baron Leigh.

== Public life ==
Villiers was educated at Eton College and at New College, Oxford. He succeeded his father in the earldom in 1915 and served briefly as a Lord-in-waiting under David Lloyd George between January and August 1919. He was a Justice of the peace and deputy lieutenant in Oxfordshire and an alderman and vice chairman for Oxfordshire County Council and a high steward for the city of Oxford. He also served as a J.P. and an alderman for Middlesex. Lord Jersey sold the Child & Co bank, part of the family's inheritance since the 5th Earl married into the Child family, to Glyn, Mills & Co. Bank in 1923. He was a member of the Ancient Order of Druids from 1905.

== Family ==
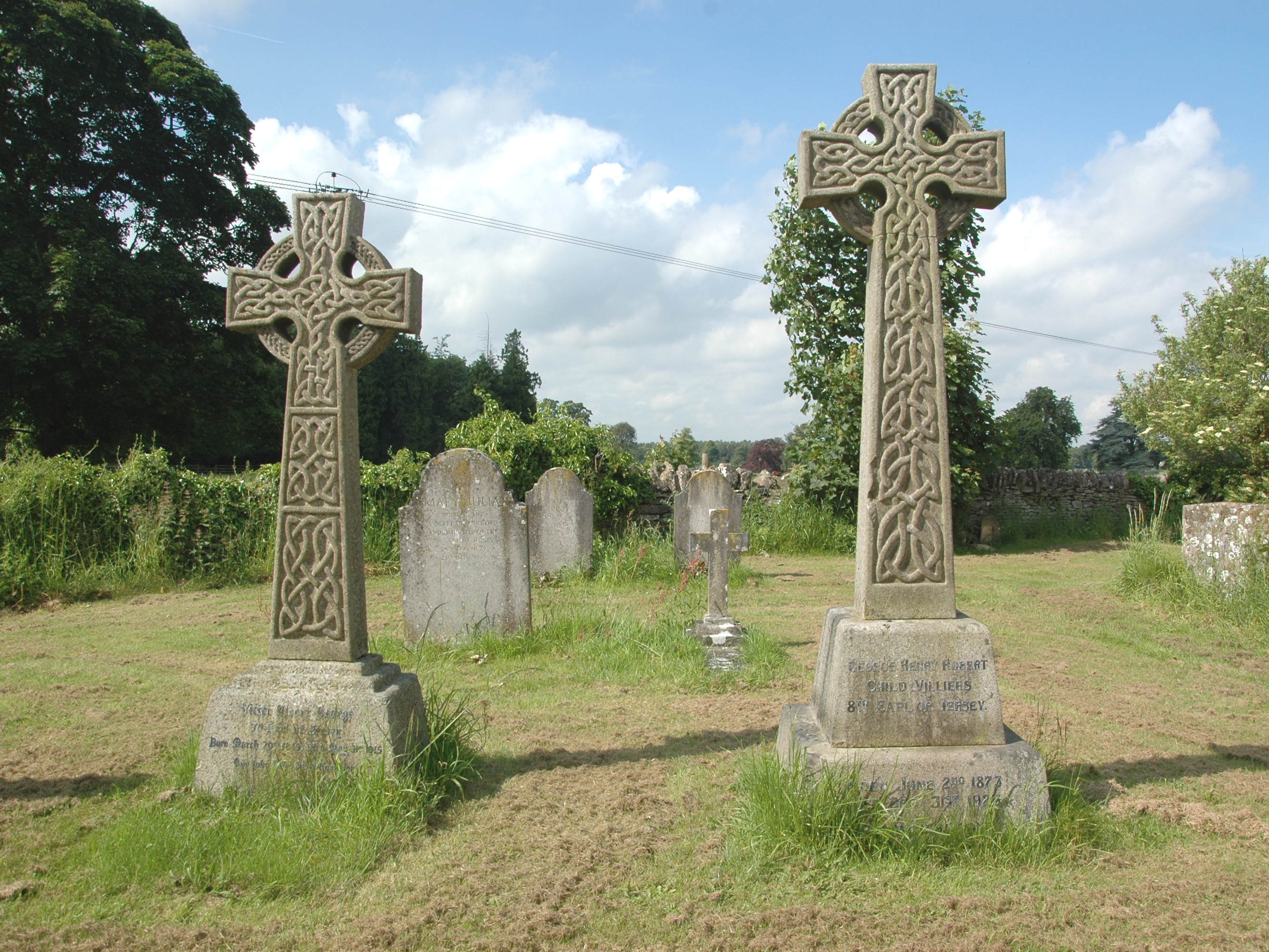
Graves of the 7th (left) and 8th (right) Earls of Jersey in All Saints' parish churchyard, Middleton Stoney, Oxfordshire

Lord Jersey married Lady Cynthia Almina Constance Mary Needham, daughter of Francis Needham, 3rd Earl of Kilmorey, and Ellen Constance Baldock, on 8 October 1908. They had four children:

- George Child Villiers, 9th Earl of Jersey (1910 – 1998).
- Lady Joan Child Villiers (1911–2010), married David Colville, (who died 1986) grandson of Charles Colville, 1st Viscount Colville of Culross.
- Hon. (Edward) Mansel Child Villiers (3 May 1913 – 9 March 1980), married twice (firstly 1934, diss. 1940 to Barbara Mary Frampton and secondly 1946, diss. 1971 to Princess Maria Gloria Pignatelli Aragona Cortez.
- Lady Ann Child Villiers (1916 – 2006), married (1937) Major Alexander Henry Elliot (d. 1986).

== Notes ==
Political offices
Preceded by The Lord Herschell	Lord-in-waiting; 1919	Succeeded by The Earl of Onslow
Peerage of England
Preceded by Victor Child Villers	Earl of Jersey; 1915 – 1923	Succeeded by George Child Villers
