= Edward Pakenham, 6th Earl of Longford =

Irish writer and peer (1902–1961)

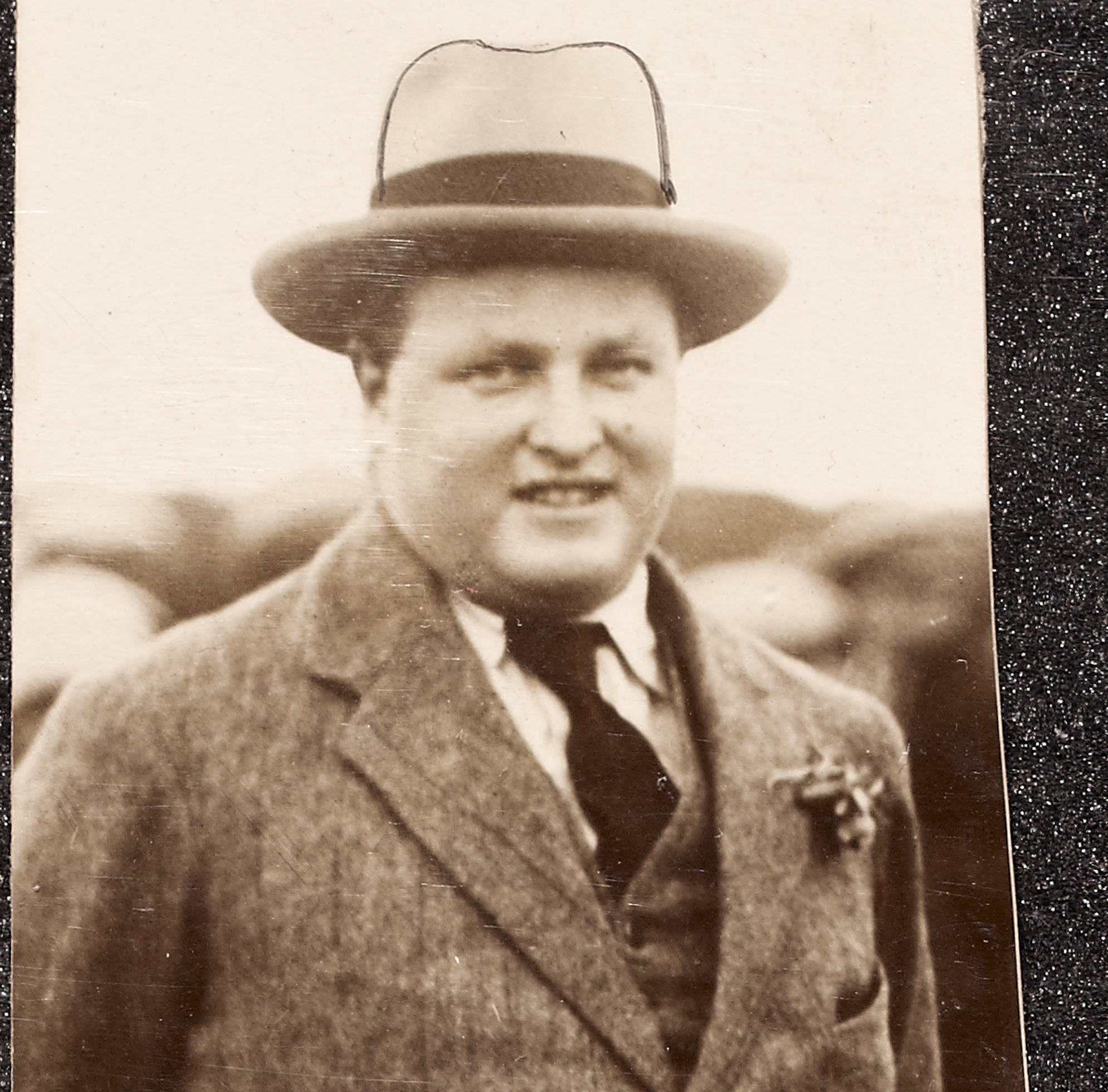
- Pakenham in 1928

Senator
- In office 7 November 1946 – 21 April 1948
- Constituency: Nominated by the Taoiseach

Personal details
- Born: 29 December 1902 London, England
- Died: 5 February 1961 (aged 58) Dublin, Ireland
- Party: Independent
- Spouse: Christine Patti Trew (m. 1925)
- Parent: Thomas Pakenham (father)
- Education: Christ Church, Oxford

Edward Arthur Henry Pakenham, 6th Earl of Longford (29 December 1902 – 5 February 1961) was an Irish peer, politician, and littérateur. Also known as Eamon de Longphort, he was a member of the fifth Seanad Éireann, the upper house of the Irish Parliament, in the 1940s.

== Early life and education ==
Pakenham was born at 14 Curzon Street, London on 29 December 1902, the elder son of Thomas Pakenham, 5th Earl of Longford and his wife Lady Mary Child-Villiers, daughter of Victor Child Villiers, 7th Earl of Jersey. He was known by the courtesy title Lord Silchester from birth until 1915 and was the only one of the Pakenham children on whom his mother doted, apparently because he would succeed to the earldom on his father's death and because he was always in delicate health.

He was educated at Eton (where he twice received the Wilder Divinity Prize) and at Christ Church, Oxford from which he graduated with a BA in 1925, later promoted to MA in 1928.

Pakenham succeeded to the earldom and its subsidiary titles on 21 August 1915 at the age of 12 when his father was killed in action in the Gallipoli campaign.

== Politics and religion ==
Longford was an Irish nationalist since his days at Eton, taking inspiration from the Easter Rising in 1916 and the 1917 Russian Revolution. He learned Irish and adopted the name Eamon de Longphort. His political views made him unpopular at both Eton and Christ Church, where he was famously put in "Mercury", the pond containing a statue of Mercury in Tom Quad.

He was a lifelong member of the extremely small Anglo-Catholic minority within the Church of Ireland.

On 7 November 1946, he was nominated by the Taoiseach, Éamon de Valera as a member of 5th Seanad, filling a vacancy caused by the death of William Magennis. He was not re-appointed to the 6th Seanad.

== Theatrical and literary activities ==
Lord Longford became Chairman of the Gate Theatre in Dublin in 1930 and continued to work for the theatre until 1936, when he founded the Longford Players.

His plays include Ascendancy, The Melians, The Vineyard, and Yahoo (about Jonathan Swift). An excellent linguist and Classical scholar, he translated Le Bourgeois gentilhomme, Le Malade Imaginaire, L'école des femmes, Tartuffe, and Le Barbier de Séville (from French) and Agamemnon and Oedipus Rex (or Oedipus Tyrannus) (from Greek) and adapted the novella Carmilla for the stage.

He often collaborated with his wife, Christine, with whom he was also responsible for redecorating Pakenham Hall in Chinese style. Pakenham Hall was often the scene of gatherings of Oxford-educated intellectuals such as John Betjeman, Evelyn Waugh, and Maurice Bowra.

Longford had several volumes of poetry published, some at the expense of his mother when he was still at Eton, but he is not considered to have been a very good poet.

== Marriage ==
Longford met Christine Patti Trew as an Oxford undergraduate. They were married on 18 July 1925 and had no children.

== Death ==
Lord Longford died in 1961 at the age of 58 and is buried at Mount Jerome Cemetery, Dublin. He was succeeded in the earldom by his younger brother, Frank.

== Publications ==
- Aeschylus, The Oresteia of Aischylos, trans. Edward Longford and Christine Longford (Dublin: Hodges, Figgis; Oxford: B. H. Blackwell, 1933)
- Edward Longford, Yahoo; a Tragedy in Three Acts (Dublin: Hodges, Figgs, 1934)
- Edward Longford, Ascendancy, a Drama of 19th-Century Ireland, in Three Acts (Dublin: Hodges, Figgis, 1935)
- Edward Longford, Armlet of Jade (Dublin: Hodges, Figgis, 1935)
- Edward Longford, The Vineyard, Being the Story of Elijah, Ahab, and Jezebel, a Drama in Three Acts (Dubli: Hodges, Figgis, 1943)
- Edward Longford, Poems from the Irish (Dublin: Hodges, Figgis, 1944)
- Edward Longford, More Poems from the Irish (Dublin: Hodges, Figgis, 1945)
- Edward Longford, The Dove in the Castle: a Collection of Poems from the Irish (Dublin: Hodges Figgis; Oxford: B.H. Blackwell, 1946)
- Molière, The School for Wives, trans. Edward Longford (Dublin: Hodges, Figgis, 1948)

== Sources and further information ==
- Bevis Hillier, Young Betjeman (London: John Murray, 1988), ch. 15
- Topical Budget: 'Shy Earl' as Blushing Bridegroom Topical Budget 726-1 (1925), BFI
- Irish Playography
- John Cowell, No Profit but the Name: The Longfords and the Gate Theatre (Dublin: O'Brien Press, 1997)
- Christopher Fitz-Simon, The Boys (London: Nick Hern Books, 1994)
- "Longford, Earl of" . Thom's Irish Who's Who . Dublin: Alexander Thom and Son Ltd. 1923. p. 139 – via Wikisource.

Peerage of Ireland
Preceded by Thomas Pakenham	Earl of Longford; 1915–1961	Succeeded by Frank Pakenham
