= Thomas Pakenham, 5th Earl of Longford =

British Army general (1864–1915)

Brigadier-General The Right Honourable The Earl of Longford KP MVO
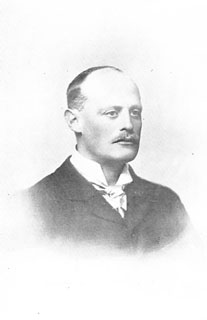

Personal details
- Born: 19 October 1864 Dublin, Ireland, United Kingdom
- Died: 21 August 1915 (aged 50) Scimitar Hill, Gallipoli, Ottoman Empire
- Cause of death: Killed in action
- Resting place: Special memorial in Green Hill Cemetery, Suvla
- Spouse: Lady Mary Child-Villiers (m. 1899)
- Children: Edward Pakenham, 6th Earl of Longford; Lady Pansy Lamb; Frank Pakenham, 7th Earl of Longford; Lady Mary Clive; Lady Violet Pakenham; Lady Julia Mount
- Parents: William Pakenham, 4th Earl of Longford; Hon. Selina Rice-Trevor
- Education: Winchester College
- Occupation: Peer, soldier

Military service
- Allegiance: United Kingdom
- Branch/service: British Army
- Rank: Brigadier-General
- Unit: 2nd Life Guards; Imperial Yeomanry: 45th Dublin Company
- Commands: Imperial Yeomanry 29th Battalion; 2nd South Midland Mounted Brigade
- Battles/wars: Second Boer War; World War I: Gallipoli campaign; Battle of Sari Bair; Battle of Scimitar Hill (DOW)

Brigadier-General Thomas Pakenham, 5th Earl of Longford, KP, MVO (19 October 1864 – 21 August 1915), known as Lord Silchester until 1887, was an Anglo-Irish hereditary peer and soldier.

== Biography ==
=== Background and early life ===
Born in Dublin, Longford was the second but eldest surviving son of William Pakenham, 4th Earl of Longford and his wife the Hon Selina Rice-Trevor, daughter of George Rice-Trevor, 4th Baron Dynevor. He succeeded in the earldom on his father's death in 1887. Educated at Winchester College, he served in the 2nd Life Guards, into which he was commissioned as a second lieutenant in February 1887, achieving the rank of colonel, and also held the honorary post of Lord-Lieutenant of County Longford from 1887 to 1915. In 1901 he was made a Knight of the Order of St Patrick.

=== Second Boer War and aftermath ===
Following the outbreak of the Second Boer War in late 1899, Lord Longford was instrumental in forming a company of volunteers from the Irish Hunt for the Imperial Yeomanry, serving in South Africa. He was formally seconded for service with the Imperial Yeomanry and appointed a captain of the 45th (Dublin) Company on 3 February 1900. The company left for South Africa in the middle of March 1900, and on arrival was attached to the 13th Battalion, Imperial Yeomanry. He was wounded and returned home the following year.

In January 1902 he was again seconded for service with the Imperial Yeomanry. He was appointed in command of the 29th Battalion (composed primarily of officers and men from the Irish Horse), with the temporary rank of lieutenant colonel (antedated to 1 January 1902), and left Ireland for South Africa in May 1902. As the senior officer, he was in command of almost 1,150 officers and men on board the transport ship Bavarian for the journey. They arrived in South Africa after the end of hostilities, as the Peace of Vereeniging was signed on 31 May, and returned home only four months later, leaving Cape Town on the SS Dilwara which arrived at Southampton in late October. Lord Longford relinquished command of the 29th battalion on their return, and returned to the 2nd life Guards, where he was promoted to the substantive rank of major on 12 January 1903.

He was promoted to brevet lieutenant colonel in March 1906 and lieutenant colonel in January 1907.

While serving on half-pay Longford was promoted to colonel in January 1911. He was placed in command of the 2nd South Midland Mounted Brigade, a Territorial Force (TF) formation, in April 1912.

=== World War I and death ===
During World War I, Lord Longford took command of his brigade, which formed part of the 2nd Mounted Division, a yeomanry formation, with the temporary rank of brigadier general, a rank he had been promoted to in August 1914.

The division was initially based in Egypt but was sent dismounted to Suvla on the Gallipoli peninsula as reinforcements during the Battle of Sari Bair. On 21 August 1915 the Division was in reserve for the final attack on Scimitar Hill. When the initial attack by the 29th Division failed, the yeomanry were ordered to advance in the open across a dry salt lake. Raked by shrapnel fire, most of the brigades halted in the shelter of Green Hill but Longford led his brigade in a charge which captured the summit of the hill. As he continued to advance, he was killed. His last words before his death were, reputedly, "Don't bother ducking, the men don't like it and it doesn't do any good…"

Longford's body was never recovered as the British made no further advances before the evacuation of Suvla on 20 December. His grave is marked as a special memorial in Green Hill Cemetery at Suvla.

In Dublin, he was a member of the Kildare Street Club.

== Marriage and children ==
Lord Longford married Lady Mary Julia Child-Villiers, daughter of Victor Child-Villiers, 7th Earl of Jersey, in 1899. They had two sons and four daughters:

- Edward Arthur Henry Pakenham, 6th Earl of Longford (29 December 1902 - 4 February 1961)
- Lady Margaret Pansy Felicia Pakenham (18 May 1904 - 19 February 1999), novelist and biographer, married painter Henry Lamb.
- Francis Aungier "Frank" Pakenham, 7th Earl of Longford (5 December 1905 - 3 August 2001)
- Lady Mary Katherine Pakenham (23 August 1907 - 19 March 2010), writer, author of Christmas at the Savages and other novels, married Major Meysey Clive.
- Lady Violet Georgiana Pakenham (13 March 1912 - 12 January 2002), writer and critic, married novelist Anthony Powell.
- Lady Julia Agnes Cynthia Pakenham (5 November 1913 - 10 September 1956), married Robert (Robin) Mount, mother of Sir Ferdinand Mount 3rd Bt.

Upon his death in 1915, Lord Longford was succeeded in the earldom by his elder son, Edward. His second son, Frank, later succeeded his elder brother and became a prominent Labour politician.

The Countess of Longford died in November 1933, aged 56.

== Notes ==
Honorary titles
Preceded by The Earl of Longford	Lord Lieutenant of Longford; 1887–1915	Vacant Title next held by The Earl of Granard
Peerage of Ireland
Preceded by William Lygon Pakenham	Earl of Longford; 1887–1915	Succeeded by Edward Arthur Henry Pakenham
