= Victor Child Villiers, 7th Earl of Jersey =

British banker, Conservative politician and colonial administrator (1845–1915)

The Right Honourable The Earl of Jersey GCB GCMG PC JP DL
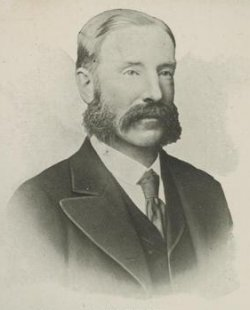
- The Earl of Jersey by H. Newman, courtesy of the National Library of Australia.

17th Governor of New South Wales
- In office January 1891 – March 1893
- Monarch: Victoria
- Preceded by: The Lord Carrington
- Succeeded by: Robert Duff

Paymaster General
- In office 1889 – December 1890
- Prime Minister: The Marquess of Salisbury
- Preceded by: The Earl Brownlow
- Succeeded by: The Lord Windsor

Personal details
- Born: 20 March 1845 Berkeley Square, London
- Died: 31 May 1915 (aged 70) Osterley Park, Middlesex
- Party: Conservative
- Spouse: Margaret Leigh (m. 1872)
- Children: 6, including George Henry Robert Child Villiers, 8th Earl of Jersey
- Parent(s): George Child Villiers, 6th Earl of Jersey; Julia Peel
- Education: Balliol College, Oxford

Victor Albert George Child Villiers, 7th Earl of Jersey, GCB, GCMG, PC, JP, DL (20 March 1845 – 31 May 1915) was a British banker, Conservative politician and colonial administrator from the Villiers family. He served as Governor of New South Wales between 1891 and 1893.

== Background and education ==
Born at Berkeley Square, London, Lord Jersey was the eldest son of George Child Villiers, 6th Earl of Jersey, and Julia Peel, daughter of Prime Minister Sir Robert Peel, Bt. He was educated at Eton and Balliol College, Oxford. He succeeded to the earldom in October 1859, aged 14, on the death of his father, who had only succeeded his father three weeks earlier. He became the principal proprietor of the family banking firm of Child & Co.

== Political career ==
Lord Jersey served as a Lord-in-waiting (government whip in the House of Lords) between 1875 and 1877 in the Conservative administration of Benjamin Disraeli. He returned to the government in 1889 when Lord Salisbury made him Paymaster General, which he remained until 1890. The latter year he was sworn of the Privy Council and made a Knight Grand Cross of the Order of St Michael and St George (GCMG).

In August 1890 Jersey was appointed Governor of New South Wales. He arrived in Australia to take up his position in January 1891. According to the Australian Dictionary of Biography, there were no major political difficulties during his term. He was described by Sir Henry Parkes as "amiable and well-intentioned", but "very much occupied with his own family". He "did not excel as a public speaker". He was the official host at the 1891 Australasian National Convention in Sydney. Jersey tendered his resignation already in November 1892 citing pressing business affairs. This did not go down well with the Colonial Office in London. Lord Salisbury thought that Jersey had found that there was "less individual power to his office than he imagined". Jersey himself wrote to the Colonial Secretary: "the duties and responsibilities of a governor can hardly be called serious nowadays being chiefly of a social character". He left Australia in March 1893.

Lord Jersey represented the United Kingdom at the 1894 Colonial Conference in Ottawa, Ontario, Canada. He also acted as Agent-General for New South Wales in London between 1903 and 1905 and through his ties with the banking institutions helped the state's loan negotiations. He revisited Australia in 1905 and Prime Minister Alfred Deakin considered appointing him Australia's first High Commissioner to London, although nothing came out of this.

One of Lord Jersey's godparents was Queen Victoria. The Queen accepted her role as a token of friendship to Robert Peel, Prime Minister, who was Lord Jersey's grandfather (his mother, the 6th Countess, being Julia Peel).

== Other public appointments ==
On 18 June 1875 the Earl was appointed Honorary Colonel of the 1st Glamorganshire Artillery Volunteers. Lord Jersey was Lord Lieutenant of Oxfordshire from 1877 and from 1885 also served as a Deputy Lieutenant of Warwickshire and as a Justice of the Peace for Warwickshire and Oxfordshire. In 1889 he was appointed the first chairman of Oxfordshire County Council. He was Paymaster-General from 1889 to 1890. In 1894, he was sent to Ottawa to act as the British government's representative to the 1894 Colonial Conference.

From 1896 to 1905 he was Chairman of the Light Railway Commission. He was made a Knight Grand Cross of the Order of the Bath in the 1900 Birthday Honours.

== Freemasonry ==
A Freemason, he was initiated to the craft on 25 October 1865 in the Apollo University Lodge No. 357 at the age of 20. In December 1865 he was passed in the Churchill Lodge No. 478 and in February 1866 he was raised in his Mother Lodge. In 1870 he was appointed Senior Grand Warden of the United Grand Lodge of England and served for a year. In 1885 he was appointed Provincial Grand Master of Oxfordshire. When he became Governor of New South Wales, he became a member of the Lodge Ionic No. 65. On 11 June 1891 he was installed Grand Master of the Grand Lodge of New South Wales.

== Family ==
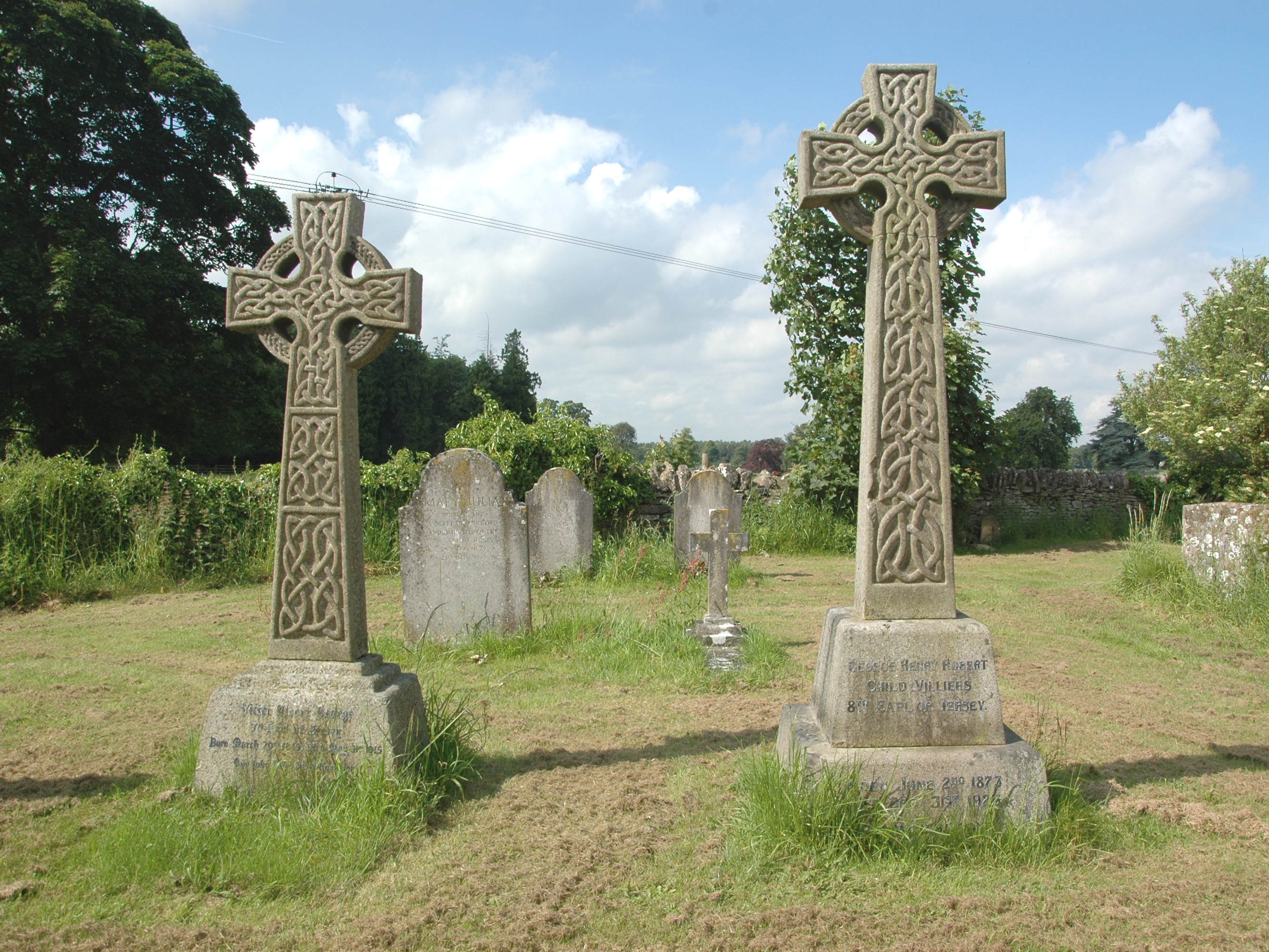
Graves of the 7th (left) and 8th (right) Earls of Jersey in All Saints' parish churchyard, Middleton Stoney, Oxfordshire

Lord Jersey married the Hon. Margaret Elizabeth Leigh (29 October 1849 – 22 May 1945), daughter and eldest child of William Henry Leigh, 2nd Baron Leigh, on 19 September 1872. They had six children:

- George Henry Robert Child Villiers, 8th Earl of Jersey (1873–1923)
- Lady Margaret Child Villiers (1874–1874), died in infancy.
- Lady Margaret Child Villiers (1875–1959), married Walter Rice, 7th Baron Dynevor, and had issue.
- Lady Mary Julia Child Villiers (1877–1933), married Thomas Pakenham, 5th Earl of Longford, and had issue.
- Lady Beatrice Child Villiers (1880–1970), married Edward Plunkett, 18th Baron of Dunsany, and had issue.
- Hon. Arthur George Child Villiers (1883–1969)

Having suffered a stroke in 1909, Lord Jersey died at Osterley Park, Middlesex, in May 1915, aged 70. He was succeeded in the earldom by his eldest son, George. The Countess of Jersey survived her husband by 30 years and died at Middleton Park, Oxfordshire, in May 1945, aged 95.

Political offices
Preceded by The Earl of Dunmore; The Earl of Roden; The Viscount Hawarden; The Lord Bagot; The Lord de Ros; The Lord Elphinstone; The Lord Walsingham	Lord-in-waiting; 1875–1877 with The Earl of Dunmore; The Earl of Roden; The Viscount Hawarden; The Lord Bagot; The Lord de Ros; The Lord Elphinstone	Succeeded by The Earl of Dunmore; The Earl of Roden; The Viscount Hawarden; The Lord Bagot; The Lord de Ros; The Lord Elphinstone; The Lord Henniker
Preceded by The Earl Brownlow	Paymaster General; 1889–1890	Succeeded by The Lord Windsor
Government offices
Preceded by The Lord Carrington	Governor of New South Wales; 1891–1893	Succeeded by Robert Duff
Diplomatic posts
Preceded by Henry Copeland	Agent-General for New South Wales; 1903 – 1905	Succeeded by Sir Timothy Coghlan
Honorary titles
Preceded by Sir Henry Dashwood, Bt	Lord Lieutenant of Oxfordshire; 1887–1915	Succeeded by The Duke of Marlborough
Peerage of England
Preceded by George Child Villiers	Earl of Jersey; 1859–1915	Succeeded by George Child Villiers
