= Middleton Park, Oxfordshire =

Rural park in Oxfordshire, England

Coordinates: 51°54′19″N 1°14′18″W

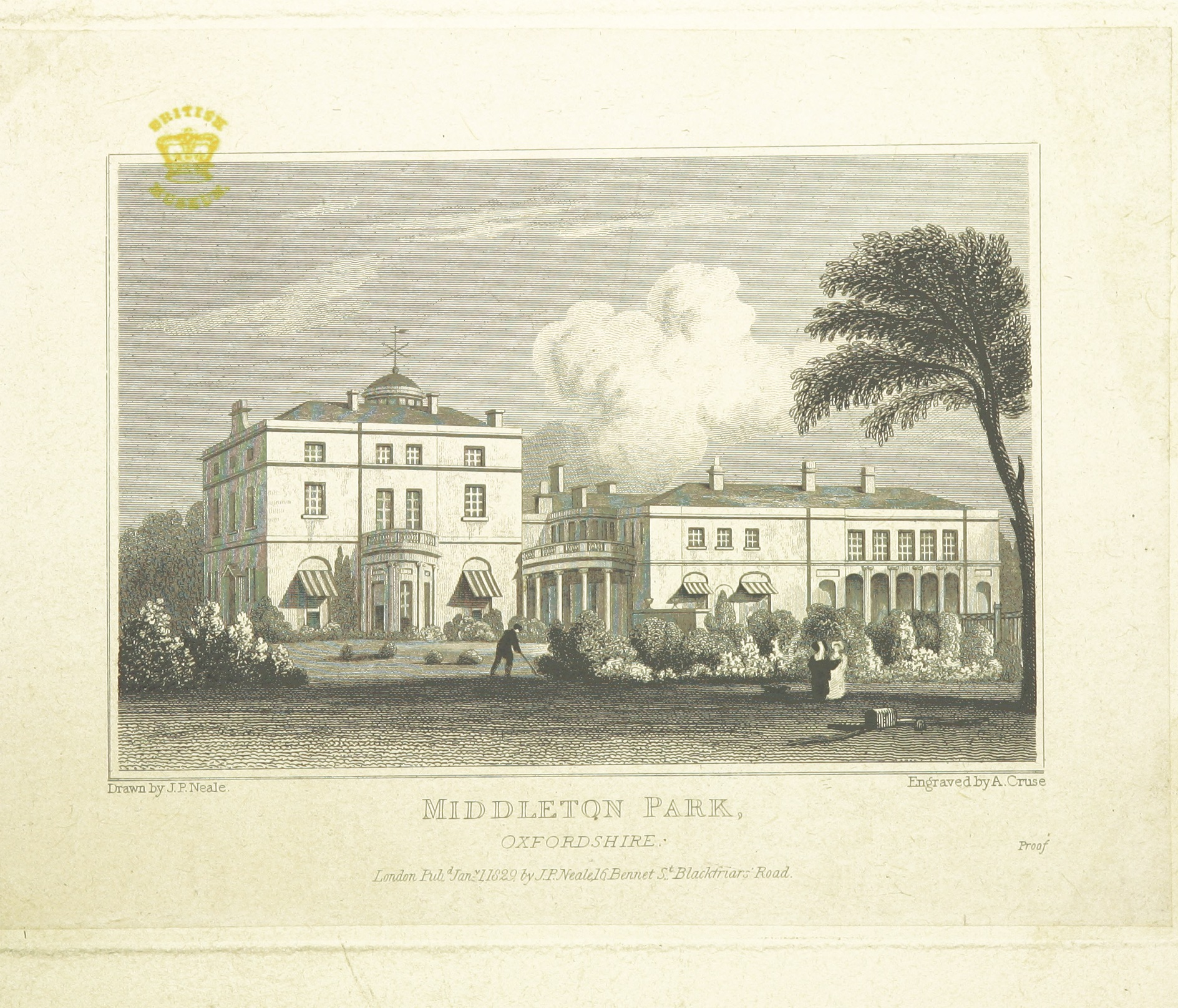
The previous house in Middleton Park in the 1820s

Middleton Park is a rural park in the parish of Middleton Stoney, Oxfordshire, England, about 2 1/2 miles (4 km) west of Bicester. The grounds are Grade II listed and include several historic buildings, notably a Grade I listed country house with Grade II* listed service wing and lodges.

== History ==
The house was designed by the English architect Edwin Lutyens and his son Robert for George Child Villiers, 9th Earl of Jersey. It was built in 1935–1938 (88 years ago) on the site of a mid-18th-century house that had been built for William Villiers, 3rd Earl of Jersey. It was Lutyens' last great country house. In 1974 it was converted into apartments. The estate was put up for sale with Savills for £15 million in 2026.

In the park east of the house are Middleton's Grade II* listed Norman parish church and the remains of a motte-and-bailey castle, which is a Scheduled Ancient Monument. The park also includes kitchen gardens, pleasure grounds, commercial woodland and the cricket ground belonging to Middleton Stoney Cricket Club.

== Bibliography ==
- Lobel, Mary D, ed. (1959). "Middleton Stoney". A History of the County of Oxford. Victoria County History. Vol. 6: Ploughley Hundred. London: Oxford University Press for the Institute of Historical Research. pp. 243–251.
- Sherwood, Jennifer; Pevsner, Nikolaus (1974). Oxfordshire. The Buildings of England. Harmondsworth: Penguin Books. pp. 703–704. ISBN 0-14-071045-0.
