= 1922 Birthday Honours =

British government recognitions

The 1922 Birthday Honours were appointments by King George V to various orders and honours to reward and highlight good works by citizens of the British Empire. The appointments were made to celebrate the official birthday of The King, and were published in The London Gazette on 2 June 1922.

Controversy from the 1922 Birthday Honours list eventually led to the passage of the Honours (Prevention of Abuses) Act 1925 and creation of the Honours Committee to formally review nominations. Sir Joseph Benjamin Robinson, chairman of the Robinson South African Banking Company and generous contributor to Prime Minister David Lloyd George's Liberal Party, was listed for a barony "for national and imperial services." Robinson quickly declined the honour within weeks after arguments erupted in the House of Lords over the circumstances of his nomination, particularly his residency in South Africa rather than in Great Britain, and that he was not recommended for the honour directly by the South African colonial government as required. "Feeling in the House of Lords ran high," reported The Times on 30 June. The Times praised Robinson's letter to the King asking for permission to decline the honour, and pushed for further questioning into the matter: "..by his action Sir Joseph Robinson has placed himself in the right and has left the Government to explain, if they can, how and why they placed themselves in the wrong. It seems clear from the letter that Sir Joseph Robinson did not in any way seek the honour. Therefore, some person or persons unknown must have sought to induce him to accept it. Who are those persons, what are their functions, and what were their motives?"

The recipients of honours are displayed here as they were styled before their new honour, and arranged by honour, with classes (Knight, Knight Grand Cross, etc.) and then divisions (Military, Civil, etc.) as appropriate.

== United Kingdom and British Empire ==
=== Baron ===
- Sir Robert Hudson Borwick Bt DL by the name, style and title of Baron Borwick, of Hawkshead in the County of Lancaster. Senior partner in the firm of George Borwick & Sons, Ltd. Rendered great service to the Government in providing hospital treatment for the sick and wounded Colonial officers throughout the war. A large contributor to the Officers Families Fund, and a generous supporter of the Red Cross Society.
- Sir William Vestey Bt by the name, style and title of Baron Vestey, of Kingswood, in the county of Surrey. Managing Director of the Union Cold Storage Company, Ltd. Has devoted his life to the production and preservation of food supplies by refrigeration, and has opened up numerous new sources of supply of refrigerated products from various parts of the world that have materially helped to cheapen the food supply of the people. Rendered immense service during the war to the country, and provided gratuitously the cold storage accommodation required for war purposes at Havre, Boulogne and Dunkirk. Head of the Blue Star Line. Has done much relief work for the poor, both in Liverpool and London, and generously contributes to charities.
- Sir Samuel James Waring Bt by the name, style and title of Baron Waring, of Foots Cray, in the County of Kent. Director of Waring & Gillow, Ltd. Director of the Duchess of Sutherland's Cripples Guild. High Sheriff of Denbighshire 1907–8. Member of Executive Committee of National Association of Ex-Soldiers. Pioneer of decorative art in furnishing. Active supporter of Boy Scout Movement. Founder of Higher Production Council. Generous supporter of charities.
- The Rt. Honorary Sir Archibald Williamson Bt MP by the name, style and title of Baron Forres, of Glenogil, in the county of Forfar. Financial and Parliamentary Secretary to the War Office 1919–21.

=== Privy Councillor ===
The King appointed the following to His Majesty's Most Honourable Privy Council:

- Lieutenant-Colonel Leopold Charles Maurice Stennett Amery MP Parliamentary and Financial Secretary to the Admiralty since 1921. Member of Parliament for the Sparkbrook Division of Birmingham since 1918. Fellow of All Souls College, Oxford.
- Lieutenant-Colonel Leslie Orme Wilson CMG DSO MP Joint Parliamentary Secretary to the Treasury. Member of Parliament for Reading since 1913.
- The Hon. William Lyon Mackenzie King CMG Prime Minister and Secretary of State for External Affairs, Dominion of Canada

=== Baronetcies ===
- Robert James Black. Chairman Mercantile Bank of India since 1906. Director of Shell Transport Company and of the London Bank of Australia. Identified with many charitable undertakings. Has been an important factor in stabilising and carrying on Anglo-Indian Finance.
- Lieutenant-Colonel Dennis Fortescue Boles CBE DL DL Member of Parliament for West Somerset 1911–18, and for Taunton Division, December 1918 to 1921. Lieutenant-Colonel late commanding 3rd Battalion, Devonshire Regiment.
- Harry Mallaby-Deeley MP Member of Parliament for East Willesden since 1910. Rendered great public service in connection with the last War Loan, duplicating the subscriptions in many places with considerable loss to himself. For public services
- John Frederick Drughorn. Director of Fred Drughorn, Ltd., The Anglo-Brazilian Line, Ltd., and the British and Continental Estates, Ltd. Generous contributor to the King's Fund and other charities.
- Brigadier-General Hugh Henry John Williams Drummond CMG Chairman of the London and South Western Railway Company since 1911
- Lieutenant-Colonel Sir John Norton-Griffiths KCB DSO MP Member of Parliament for Wednesbury from 1910 to 1918 and for Wandsworth Central since 1918. Late Lieutenant-Colonel 2nd King Edward's Horse. Rendered valuable War services.
- Hildebrand Aubrey Harmsworth, For public services.
- Sir John Harrison DL Mayor of Stockton-on-Tees for the fifth time. Member of the Durham County Council, Tees Pilotage Board. Chairman of Education Committee. Has taken a very active part in the public life of Stockton-on-Tees. For public and local services.
- Lieutenant-Colonel Emmanuel Hoyle OBE Has taken an active part in the local government of the town of Huddersfield and rendered great municipal service there. Has given very largely to charities and also expended much time and money on Clubs and Hospitals for soldiers throughout the war
- Sir Berkeley George Andrew Moynihan KCMG CB FRCS Army Medical Advisory Board. Professor of Clinical Surgery, University of Leeds. Hon. Surgeon Leeds General Infirmary. Member of Council of Royal College of Surgeons of England.
- Edmund Nuttall AMICE Head of the firm of Nuttall and Co., Civil Engineers and Contractors, of Manchester. The firm has been responsible for numerous engineering works of national importance. Has been associated with many philanthropic works. For national services.
- Edward Sharp. Head of the firm which bears his name. Generous contributor to charities in Maidstone and in Kent. Has been President of the National Sunday School Union. Has taken a keen interest in and been a generous supporter of many public institutions.
- Sir Edward David Stern DL Deputy Lieutenant for Surrey. High Sheriff 1904. Head of the firm of Stern Brothers. A generous benefactor to charities.
- George Sutton MIEE Chairman and managing director of Henley's Telegraph Works. One of the founders and past Chairman of the Cable Makers Association. Founded a number of scholarships for elementary school children at secondary schools. A generous contributor to a large number of charities. Served on Beckenham Education Committee for 19 years and on Beckenham Urban District Council for 12 years.
- Woolmer Rudolph Donati White DL Deputy Lieutenant for Hampshire. Head of the firm of Timothy White and Co., Chemists and Merchants. Carried on for many years a free school for poor children in Portsmouth, High Sheriff for the county of Norfolk in 1914, and rendered great service in recruiting. Liberal subscriber to hospitals and charities.

=== Knight Bachelor ===
- Edwin Airey, Governing Director of William Airey & Son, Engineers and Contractors. Rendered considerable assistance to the Ministry of Munitions during the war, and subsequently to the Ministry of Health. An active participant in the direction of many Organisations for social welfare and education
- Hugh Kerr Anderson FRS Master of Gonville and Caius College, Cambridge, since 1912.
- Lieutenant-Colonel Alan Hughes Burgoyne MP Member of Parliament for North Kensington since 1910. Director of P. B. Burgoyne & Co., Ltd. Has written much upon naval questions and founded the Navy League Annual in 1907, which he edited for seven years
- James William Bulmer, Head of the Firm of Smith, Bulmer & Co., Worsted Spinners, of Halifax. Served on the Wool Statistical Committee and on the Wool Textile Control Board. Chairman of Executive of Yorkshire National Liberal Council. For public services.
- Herbert Atkinson Barker, Specialist in manipulating surgery
- Robert Appleby Bartram DL One of the Senior DLs of Sunderland. Leading educationalist from 1870. A generous, benefactor to charitable, religious and educational bodies in Sunderland.
- William Haddock Bayliss FRS Professor of General Physiology in University College London. Is recognised as one of the leading physiologists of the world. His researches in the War afforded the scientific basis of treatment which resulted in conspicuous benefit to the troops and the saving of many lives
- Thomas Brodrick DL General Secretary and Accountant of the Co-operative Wholesale Society, Ltd. Celebrates his Jubilee in the service of the Co-operative movement this year
- Walter Herbert Cockerline. Ex-Sheriff of the City of Hull. Member of the Council of the North of England Shipowners Association. Has devoted much time to the public service.
- Edward Thomas Frederick Crowe CMG Commercial Counselor at His Majesty's Embassy at Tokyo. A senior Member of the Commercial Diplomatic Service
- Henry Fielding Dickens KC Treasurer of the Inner Temple. Common Sgt. since 1917
- Ernest John Fawke. A Director of the Central and Western Corporation. Has interested himself regarding Smoke and Noxious Vapours abatement reported upon by Lord Newton's Committee.
- Charles Harding Firth Regius Professor of Modern History at Oxford since 1904.
- Robert Septimus Gardiner, Editor of the Near East, a publication much valued in Egypt, Palestine and the East. Manager of important Colliery and Shipping undertakings in the North of England.
- Charles Tyrrell Giles KC DL MP North Cambridge 1895–1900. Chairman Wimbledon Conservative Association for1 20 years. High Sheriff of Surrey 1915–16. Deputy Lieutenant Surrey 1915
- Dan Godfrey, Director of Music to the Corporation of Bournemouth since 1893. For valuable services to British Music
- Major Collingwood George Clements Hamilton MP Member of Parliament for the Altrincham Division of Cheshire since 1913. Director of Enrollment National Service, 1917. Parliamentary Private Secretary to the Minister of Pensions, 1919–20
- Ernest Montague Hughman, Late Partner in Pyne, Hughman & Co., Engineers and Shipbuilders. Member of Council of Institution of Engineers, India, and Honorary Secretary, Indian Council, English Institution of Electrical Engineers. For public services.
- Edward Mauger Iliffe CBE Director of Iliffe & Sons, Publishers. Controller of Machine Tool Department of the Ministry of Munitions. President of Coventry Chamber of Commerce. Devoted much time to hospital, municipal and local public work
- Alderman William Kay, twice Lord Mayor of Manchester. For public services.
- Professor Frederick William Keeble CBE FRS Sherardian Professor of Botany and Fellow of Magdalen College, Oxford
- John Arthur Levy, Adviser to the Government in regard to diamond trading during the war.
- Maurice Lowe, For services rendered at Washington in connection with the Press.
- John Macpherson CB FRCPE Professor of Psychiatry in the University of Sydney, N.S.W. Medical Commissioner in Lunacy for Scotland, 1899. Has rendered excellent service in connection with Scottish Lunacy administration.
- Robert McCraken, chairman of the firm of Steel Brothers & Company, Fenchurch Street. Represented Burmah in London Chamber of Commerce for many years. Generous contributor to London charities.
- William Mills, Inventor of the Mills Hand Grenade, used exclusively and successfully by the British and other Allies throughout the war, and of which seventy-five millions were supplied. Member of the Council of the Birmingham Chamber of Commerce. Member of the Imperial Mineral Resources Bureau
- John Ashley Mullens, Government Broker
- Alfred James Rice-Oxley CBE MRCS MRCP DL Three times Mayor of Kensington
- Albert Lindsay Parkinson MP Member of Parliament for Blackpool since 1918. Mayor of Blackpool from 1916 to 1919, and was conspicuously energetic and successful in all work connected with the war during that period
- Edward James Pollock, Official Referee since 1897
- Samuel Murray Power CB Chief Clerk, Irish Office, 1909–1922
- Charles Thornton Pulley DL Late Member of Parliament for Hereford, and formerly Chairman of the Hereford Division cf the Unionist Association. Chairman during the war of the South Herefordshire Joint Parliamentary Recruiting Committee, and chairman of many other Committees formed to carry on war work in Herefordshire
- Henry Norman Rae MP Member of Parliament for Shipley Division of Yorkshire. For public services during and after the war.
- Edward John Russell OBE FRS Director of Rothamsted Experimental Station under the Ministry of Agriculture
- William Fleming Russell DL President of the Glasgow Chamber of Commerce. A member of the Glasgow Town Council for many years. Honorary President of the Scottish Unionist Association, and at present Chairman of its Western Divisional Council
- David Maurice Serjeant Holds unique position as Colonist, Volunteer, patriotic writer and municipal worker
- Thomas Shipstone, chairman and managing director of James Shipstone and Sons, Ltd., of Nottingham. Magistrate of the city and a Governor of the Nottingham General Hospital. A generous contributor to many charitable and philanthropic institutions. Rendered important service to the Red Cross Society during the war, presenting amongst other things a fully equipped motor ambulance.
- Sydney Martin Skinner, Chairman of John Barker and Co., and of Employers Organisation for the distributive trade. Has also done much municipal work, being Chairman of various Committees and Higher Education Committees. A generous contributor to philanthropic and charitable institutions. For public services.
- Major Hugh James Protheroe Thomas OBE DL DL Partner in the firm of James Thomas and Son, established 120 years, Land and Estate Agency. Owner of the town of Milford Haven, which he freed from all tolls amounting to many thousands of pounds. Deputy Lieutenant and Deputy Lieutenant for the County of Haverfordwest.
- William Walker CBE Recently retired from the post of Director of Health and Safety in the Mines Department of the Board of Trade
- Henry Whitehead, Director of the firm, of Sir Titus Salt and Co. President of the Bradford Chamber of Commerce. Generous public benefactor. For public and war services.
- James Edward Woods DL Deputy Lieutenant for the city and county of Newcastle upon Tyne. High Sheriff for the County of Northumberland. Honorary Treasurer of the Royal Victoria Infirmary. For 26 years Honorary Treasurer to the Northern Union of Conservative and Constitutional Associations. A most generous supporter of all local charities.

British India

- Khan Bahadur Muhammad Habibullah Sahib Bahadur, Member of the Executive Council, Madras
- Justice Jwala Prasad Raj Bahadur, Puisne Judge of the High Court of Judicature, Patna, Bihar and Orissa
- Henry Sharp CSI CIE Secretary to the Government of India, Education Department
- Robert Sidney Giles, Vice-Chancellor, University of Rangoon, Burma
- Reginald Clarke CIE Commissioner of Police, Calcutta, Bengal
- Claude Fraser de la Fosse CIE Director of Public Instruction (now on special duty), United Provinces
- Khan Bahadur Ahmad Tambi Ghulani Muhiud-Din Ahmad Tambi Marakkayar, Merchant, Negapatam, Madras
- M. R. Ry. Diwan Bahadur Tirumalai Desika Achariyar Avargal, Member of the Madras Legislative Council, and President of the Trichinopoly District Board, Madras
- Hormusjee Cowasjee Dinshaw OBE MVO Senior partner in firm of Messrs. Cowasjee Dinshaw and Brothers, Aden
- Raj Onkar Mull Jatia Bahadur OBE Banker and Merchant, Calcutta, Bengal
- Charles Porten Beachcroft, Indian Civil Service (retired), late Puisne Judge, Calcutta High Court, Bengal
- Raj Bahadur Lala Ganga Ram CIE MVO Executive Engineer, Public Works Department, Punjab (retired)
- Rao Bahadur Pandit Sukhdeo Pershad CIE Political and Revenue Member, Council of Regency, Jodhpur, Rajputana
- Manubhai Nandshankar Mehta CSI Minister, Baroda

Colonies, Protectorates, etc.

- Lieutenant-Colonel Charles Llewellyn Andersson OBE Officer Commanding Civic Guard, Johannesburg, Union of South Africa
- Jacob William Barth CBE Chief Justice of His Majesty's Supreme Court of Kenya
- The Hon. Walter Charles Frederick Carncross, Speaker of the Legislative Council, Dominion of New Zealand
- Charles Pitcher Clarke KC Attorney-General, Barbados
- Julius Jeppe CBE of Johannesburg, Union of South Africa, in recognition of public services
- Thomas Ranken Lyle FRS Chairman of the Electricity Commissioners of the State of Victoria
- John Charles Peter, Manager of the Hong Kong and Shanghai Banking Corporation, Singapore, Straits Settlements
- Mark Sheldon, of the City of Sydney, in recognition of services rendered to the Commonwealth of Australia
- George Tallis, of the City of Melbourne, in recognition of services rendered to the Commonwealth, of Australia
- William Thomson lately Registrar of the University of South Africa, in recognition of his services to higher education in the Union of South Africa
- Clarkson Henry Tredgold Senior Judge of the High Court of Southern Rhodesia

=== The Most Honourable Order of the Bath ===
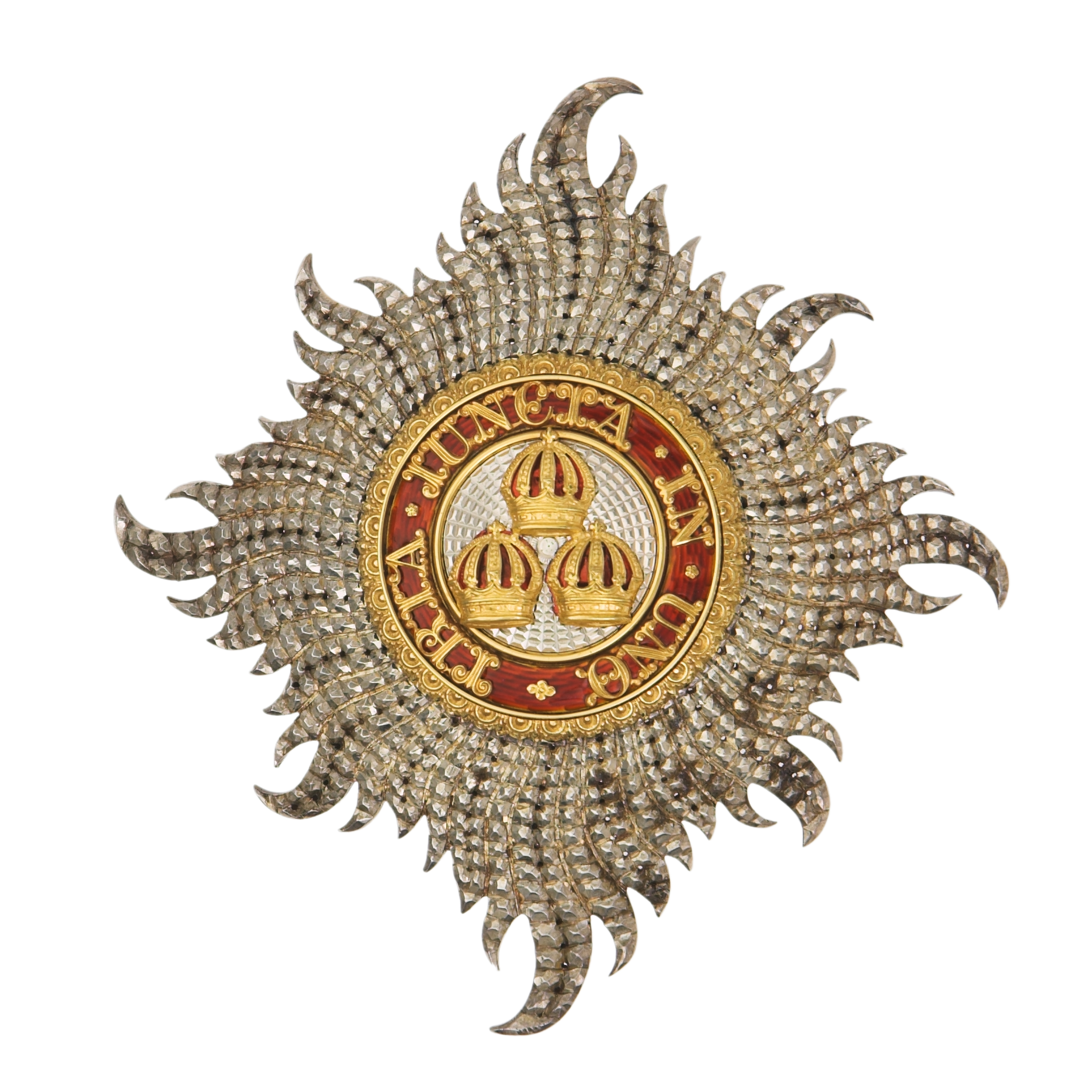
Civilian star of the Knight Grand Cross of the Order of the Bath

==== Knight Grand Cross of the Order of the Bath (GCB) ====
===== Military Division =====
Royal Navy

- Admiral the Hon. Sir Somerset Arthur Gough-Calthorpe GCMG KCB CVO

==== Knight Commander of the Order of the Bath (KCB) ====
===== Military Division =====
Royal Navy

- Rear-Admiral Sir Alfred Ernle Montacute Chatfield KCMG CB CVO
- Surgeon Vice-Admiral Sir Robert Hill KCMG CB CVO FRCSE

Army

- Lieutenant-General Sir James Frederick Noel Birch KCMG CB (Colonel Commandant, Royal Artillery), Director-General of the Territorial Army
- Major-General Sir Gerald Francis Ellison KCMG CB Deputy Quartermaster-General, War Office
- Major-General Warren Hastings Anderson CB Commandant, Staff College, Camberley
- Major-General Alfred Percy Blenkinsop CB CMG Deputy Director of Medical Services, Eastern Command
- Lieutenant-General Sir Walter Sinclair Delamain KCMG CB DSO (Colonel, 117th Mahrattas), Indian Army, Adjutant-General, Headquarters, India
- Major-General Alexander Wallace CB late Indian Army
- Colonel Sir William Wilson Hoy CB Forces of the Union of South Africa

===== Civil Division =====
- George William Chrystal CB Permanent Secretary, Ministry of Pensions
- Walter Frederick Nicholson CB Secretary to the Air Ministry
- James Arthur Salter CB Secretary, Reparation Commission
- Robert Russell Scott CB CSI Controller of Establishments, Treasury
- Thomas Lonsdale Webster CB Clerk of the House of Commons

==== Companion of the Order of the Bath (CB) ====
===== Military Division =====
Royal Navy

- Rear-Admiral Francis Martin-Leake DSO
- Captain Barry Edward Domvile CMG RN
- Engineer Captain William Rattey OBE RN
- Colonel Commandant Gerald Robert Poole CMG DSO ADC Royal Marine Artillery

Army

- Colonel Gilbert Robertson Frith CMG DSO Colonel on the Staff in charge of Administration, Iraq
- Colonel Charles Henry Dudley Ryder CIE DSO late Royal Engineers
- Colonel Graham Henry Whalley Nicholson CMG Commanding Royal Artillery, Divisional Troops, Southern Command
- Colonel Robert Sidney Hamilton CMG DSO Assistant Director of Ordnance Services, Southern Command
- Colonel Harry McMicking DSO Embarkation Commandant, Southampton
- Colonel Bertie Coore Dent CMG DSO Commander, Baghdad District, Iraq
- Major-General Harington Owen Parr CMG Indian Army, Deputy Adjutant-General, Headquarters, India
- Major-General Sir Andrew Skeen KCIE CMG Indian Army, General Officer Commanding, Kohat District, Northern Command, India
- Colonel Alexander Leigh Tarver CIE DSO ADC Indian Army, Brigade Commander, 14th Indian Infantry Brigade

Royal Air Force

- Air Commodore John Miles Steel CMG CBE

===== Civil Division =====
- Captain Edmund Moore Cooper Cooper-Key MVO RN (retd.)
- Engineer Commander Sydney Undercliffe Hardcastle RN
- Instructor Captain Horace Herbert Holland RN
- Captain Charles Edward Irving RD RNR
- Brigadier-General William Bromley-Davenport CMG CBE DSO TD late Territorial Army Reserve
- Frank Ashley Barrett, Commissioner and Secretary, Board of Inland Revenue
- George Alexander Calder Ex-Secretary, Public Works Loan Board
- Sir Frederick William Alfred Clarke. Accountant-General, Board of Customs and Excise
- Joseph Beardsell Crosland Senior Director of Finance, War Office
- Arthur Lewis Dixon CBE Assistant Secretary, Home Office
- William James Evans CBE Director of Establishments, Admiralty
- Egerton Spencer Grey, Senior Official Receiver in Bankruptcy and Controller of the Enemy Debts Clearing Office in 1919
- The Hon. Ronald Charles Lindsay CVO
- Minister Plenipotentiary in the Diplomatic Service. Assistant Under Secretary for Foreign Affairs since January 1921
- John Rowland CBE Commissioner, Welsh Board of Health
- Oswald Richard Arthur Simpkin CBE Public Trustee
- Brigadier-General Frederic Herbert Williamson CBE Assistant Secretary, General Post Office

=== The Most Exalted Order of the Star of India ===
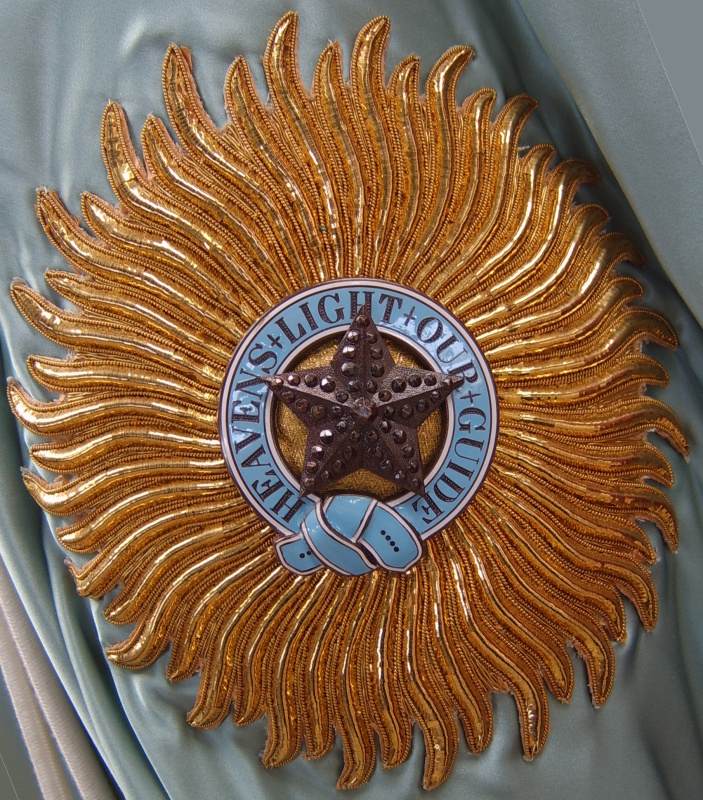
Star of a Knight Grand Commander of the Most Exalted Order of the Star of India

==== Knight Grand Commander (GCSI) ====
- His Excellency the Rt. Hon. Sir Auckland Campbell Geddes KCB His Majesty's Ambassador Extraordinary and Plenipotentiary to the United States of America

==== Knight Commander (KCSI) ====
- Raja Sir Muhammad Ali Muhammad Khan, Khan Bahadur KCIE CSI of Mahmudabad, Member of the Governor's Executive Council, United Provinces
- Sir Jamsetjee Jejeebhoy Bt Bombay
- Sir Sassoon Jacob David Bt President, Bombay Municipality
- Sir William Mitchell Acworth
- William Grenfell Max Muller CB MVO His Majesty's Envoy Extraordinary and Minister Plenipotentiary to the Republic of Poland

==== Companion (CSI) ====
- Major-General Walter Clarence Black CIE Indian Army, Military Secretary to His Excellency the Commander-in-Chief
- Leslie Harry Saunders, Indian Civil Service, Judicial Commissioner, Upper Burma
- George Bancroft Lambert, Indian Civil Service, Chief Secretary to Government, United Provinces
- Basil Copleston Allen, Indian Civil Service, Commissioner, Assam Valley Division
- John Edward Webster CIE Indian Civil Service, Commissioner, Surma Valley and Hill Districts, Assam
- Thomas Eyebron Moir CIE Indian Civil Service, Secretary to Government, Finance Department, Madras
- M. R. Ry. Diwan Bahadur Raghunatha Rao Ramachandra Rao Avargal, Secretary to Government, Law Department, Madras
- Major Cyril Charles Johnson Barrett CIE Bombay Political Service, First Assistant Resident, Aden
- Sir dar Bahadur Nawab Mehrab Khan, Chief of the Bugti tribe, Baluchistan

=== The Most Distinguished Order of Saint Michael and Saint George ===
Star of the Order of Saint Michael and Saint George

==== Knight Commander of the Order of St Michael and St George (KCMG) ====
- The Hon. Henry Newman Barwell Premier and Attorney-General of the State of South Australia
- Lieutenant-Colonel Edward Charles Frederick Garraway CMG Resident Commissioner, Basutoland
- John Shuckburgh Risley KC CB Legal Adviser, Colonial Office

==== Companion of the Order of St Michael and St George (CMG) ====
- William Herbert Barrett, an Assistant General Manager of Railways and Harbours, Union of South Africa
- Albert Ruskin Cook OBE recognition of services to the Uganda Protectorate
- James Corbett Davis, Treasurer to the Zanzibar Government
- Carl de Verteuil, lately a Member of the Legislative Council of the Colony of Trinidad and Tobago, in recognition of services to agriculture
- Alwin Robinson Dickinson, British Phosphate Commissioner
- Joseph Firth, in recognition of public services in the Dominion of New Zealand
- Arthur George Murchison Fletcher CBE Assistant Colonial Secretary and Clerk of Councils, Colony of Hong Kong
- Colin Campbell Garbett CIE lately Political Secretary to the High Commissioner and Commander-in-Chief for Iraq
- Edward Burns Harkness, Under-Secretary, Department of the Chief Secretary, and Undersecretary, Ministry of Public Health, State of New South Wales
- Howard Hitchcock OBE Mayor of Geelong, in the State of Victoria, in recognition of his public services
- Emilius Hopkinson DSO Travelling Commissioner in the Gambia Protectorate
- Arthur Edwin Horn Director of Medical and Sanitary Services, Straits Settlements and Federated Malay States
- Albert Ernest Kitson CBE Director of Geological Survey, Gold Coast Colony
- The Hon. Charles William Oakes, Colonial Secretary, State of New South Wales
- Herbert Richmond Palmer, Senior Resident, Northern Provinces, Nigeria
- Colonel Robert Francis Peel, Governor and Commander-in-Chief of the Island of Saint Helena
- Thomas Alfred Wood MBE in recognition of public services to Kenya
- Lau Chu Pak, Unofficial Member of the Legislative Council of the Colony of Hong Kong (posthumous)

=== The Most Eminent Order of the Indian Empire ===
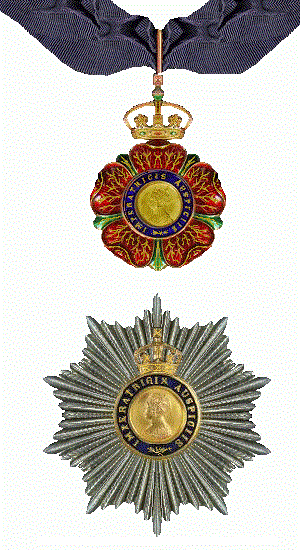
Riband, badge and star of the Knight Grand Commander of the Order of the Indian Empire

==== Knight Grand Commander (GCIE) ====
- His Highness Maharaja Sir Ghanshyamsinhji Ajitsinhji KCSI Maharaja of Dhrangadhra, Bombay

==== Knight Commander (KCIE) ====
- John Henry Kerr CSI CIE Indian Civil Service, Member Bengal Executive Council

==== Companion (CIE) ====
- Alexander Marr, Indian Civil Service, Financial Secretary to the Government of Bengal (on leave)
- Lawrence Morley Stubbs, Indian Civil Service, Magistrate and Collector, Bareillyj United Provinces
- Colonel Robert St. John Hickman VD ADC Tea Planter and Commandant of the Surma Valley Light Horse, Assam
- James MacDonald Dunnett, Indian Civil Service, Deputy Commissioner in the Punjab
- Lieutenant-Colonel Michael Lloyd Ferrar OBE Indian Army, Deputy Commissioner in the Punjab
- Levett Mackenzie Kaye, Inspector-General of Police, United Provinces
- Jonathan Webster Coryton Mayne, Indian Educational Service, Principal, Rajkumar College, Rajkot, Bombay
- Walter Swain, Deputy Inspector-General of Police (on leave), Bihar and Orissa
- Cyril James Irvin, Indian Civil Service, Deputy Commissioner, Nagpur, Central Provinces
- Lancelot Colin Bradford Glascock MVO Senior Superintendent of Police, Delhi
- Richard Howard Hitchcock MBE District Superintendent of Police (on military duty), Madras
- Edwin Lessware Price OBE Merchant, Karachi, Bombay
- Raj Bahadur Chuni Lai Basu ISO Chemical Examiner to the Government of Bengal (retired), late Sheriff of Calcutta, Bengal
- Cecil Frank Beadel, Partner, Messrs. Becker, Gray and Co., Calcutta, Bengal
- Gavin Scott, Indian Civil Service, President, Rangoon Municipality
- Horace Mason Haywood, Secretary, Bengal Chamber of Commerce

=== The Royal Victorian Order ===
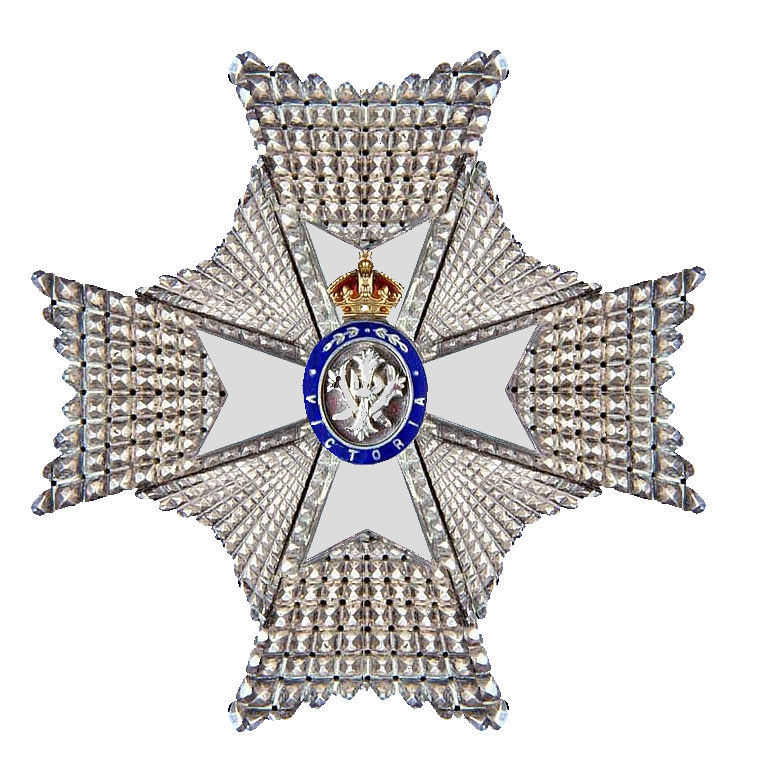
Insignia of a Knight / Dames Commander of the Royal Victorian Order

==== Knight Grand Cross of the Royal Victorian Order (GCVO) ====
- The Rt. Hon. Rufus Daniel, Earl of Reading GCB KCVO
- The Rt. Hon. Savile Brinton, Baron Somerleyton KCVO

==== Knight Commander of the Royal Victorian Order (KCVO) ====
- Sir Rajendra Nath Mukharji KCIE
- Sir Alexander Campbell Mackenzie
- Richard Robert Cruise CVO FRCSE Ophthalmic surgeon

==== Commander of the Royal Victorian Order (CVO) ====
- Sir William McLintock KBE
- Brigadier-General Sir Charles Wallis King CB CMG MVO
- Sir Francis Morgan Bryant CBE MVO ISO
- Rear-Admiral Hugh Dudley Richards Watson CB CBE MVO
- Captain Basil Vernon Brooke RN (dated 29 March 1922)
- Vincent Esch, Architect in India
- Ernest Mathews, Royal Agricultural Society

==== Member of the Royal Victorian Order, 4th class (MVO) ====
- Captain Kenelm Everard Lane Creighton RN
- John Henry Girling
- Surgeon Commander Frank Hutton Nimmo RN
- Paymaster Lieutenant-Commander Leslie Norman Sampson RN
- Lieutenant-Colonel William Angel Scott

==== Member of the Royal Victorian Order, 5th class (MVO) ====
- Superintendent Frederick William Abbott, Metropolitan Police
- Superintendent William Joseph Hopkins, Metropolitan Police
- Alfred Vigor Marten Robert Burns Robertson

=== The Most Excellent Order of the British Empire ===
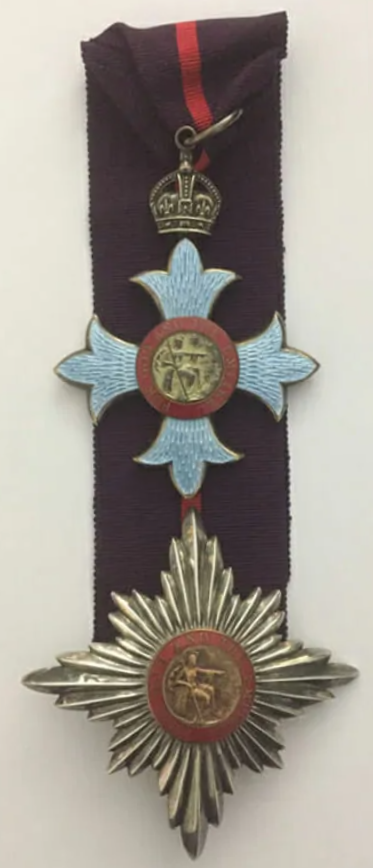
Knight Commander of the Order of the British Empire, insignia 1917–35

==== Knight Grand Cross of the Order of the British Empire (GBE) ====
===== Civil Division =====
- The Rt. Hon. Sir Laming Worthington-Evans Bt MP

==== Knight Commander of the Order of the British Empire (KBE) ====
===== Military Division =====
Royal Navy

- Vice-Admiral Thomas Dawson Lees Sheppard CB MVO

===== Civil Division =====
Colonies, Protectorates, etc.

- The Hon. Maui Pomare CMG Member of the Executive Council of the Dominion of New Zealand, representing the Native Race and Minister in Charge of the Cook Islands. For valuable services to the Empire.

=== Kaisar-i-Hind Medal ===
First Class

- The Reverend Father François Bertram, Principal and Manager, St. Joseph's College, Trichinoipoly, Madras
- Alice, Lady Todhunter OBE Madras
- The Reverend Doctor Hugh Robert Scott, Missionary, Irish Presbyterian Mission in Gujarat, Bombay
- Eleanore Thompson, Lady Superintendent, Medical College Hospital, Calcutta;, Bengal
- Ernest Hanbury Hankin, Honorary Fellow, Allahabad University, late Chemical Examiner to Government, United Provinces
- Edith Mary Brown Principal, Women's Christian Medical College, Ludhiana, Punjab
- Margaret Dobson, Lyallpur, Punjab. Lily Chatteirton, Nagpur, Central Provinces
- Rao Bahadur Vinayakraoi Krishnaraoi Mulye, Revenue Member, Council of Regency, Rewa State, Central India
- Susan Campbell LRCP in charge of the Zenana Hospital, Scottish Missions, Rajputana

=== Air Force Cross (AFC) ===
- Flying Officer William Forster Dickson DSO
- Flying Officer Arthur Gordon Jarvis
- Flying Officer Aubrey Robert Maxwell Rickards

==== Awarded a Second Bar to the Air Force Cross (AFC**) ====
- Flight Lieutenant Paul Ward Spencer Bulman MC AFC*

=== Imperial Service Order (ISO) ===
Home Civil Service

- William George Bishop MBE H.M. Stationery Office
- John Bradbury, Chief Clerk, Board of Control
- Robert Henry Brodie, Assistant Keeper of Records, Public Record Office
- William Henry Bulley, Inspector of Reformatory Schools, Home Office
- Frederick Thomas Marshall Hughes, Land Registry
- Robert Matthew Kearns, Chief Examining Surveyor, H.M. Office of Works
- William Lewis, Chief Clerk, Office of Director of Public Prosecutions
- Walter John Moulton, Law Section, Board of Education
- Thomas Parker Porter, H.M. Consul General, Boston
- William Douglas Smart, Crown Office, Edinburgh
- Stanley George Spencer, Ministry of Transport
- Thomas Wilson, Colonial Office

Colonial Civil Service

- Wallace Haynes Cook, Secretary of the Poor Law Commissioners, Colony of British Guiana
- William Burton Edwards, Acting Public Service Commissioner, Commonwealth of Australia
- Jules Ellenberger, Government Secretary, Bechuanaland Protectorate
- Thomas Fisher, Chief Keeper of Prisons, Colony of the Leeward Islands
- John O'Donovan MVO lately Commissioner of Police, Dominion of New Zealand
- Justinian Oxenham, Secretary, Postmaster General's Department, Commonwealth of Australia
- Annand Podesta, lately Chief Clerk and Cashier, Treasury Department, Gibraltar
- Candiah Stantheiram, Chief Appraiser, Customs Department, Island of Ceylon
- Herbert Gordon Watson, Clerk of the Executive Council, Union of South Africa

Indian Civil Service

- Major Albert William Jordon Lynsdale, Acting Professor of Materia Medica, Medical College, Madras
- M. R. Ry. Diwan Bahadur Saravana Bhavanandam Pillai Avargal, Deputy Commissioner of Police, Madras
- Frederick Robert Grindal, Assistant Secretary to Government, Public Works Department, Irrigation Department, Punjab
- Chhaganlal Manecklal Tijoriwalla, Office Superintendent to the Commissioner of Police, Bombay
- Frederick William Martin, Chief Superintendent of Excise, Burma
- Babu Panna Lai Dutt, Accountant, Bengal Secretariat, Calcutta, Bengal
- Cyril Hubert Martin, Registrar, Department of Revenue and Agriculture, Government of India
- Sardar Sahib Sardar Bishan Singh, Deputy Superintendent of Police, Punjab
- James William Septimus Inglis, Superintendent, Government of India, Foreign and Political Department
- Mehta Muhkam Chand, Head Clerk, Deputy Commissioner's Office, Hazara, North-West Frontier Province

=== Imperial Service Medal (ISM) ===
- Shaik Daud Ghulam Dastagir, Duffadar, Revenue Secretariat, Madras
- Mahomed Eusuff Abdul Aziz, Duffadar, British Consulate Office, Pondicherry, Madras
- Syed Meer Syed Mohideen, Duffadar, Collector's Office, Chittoor (retired), Madras
- Janardhan Singh Hanuman Singh, Jemadar, Collector's Office, Ganjam (retired), Madras
- Rustum Khan, Jemadar, Government House, United Provinces
- Mathura Prasad, Compounder, Police Hospital, Bilaspur, Central Provinces
- Khan Bahadur Rissaldar-Major Ahmad Bahksh, Majordomo to the Agent to the Governor-General in Baluchistan
- Balu Bhikaji, Havildar of Deputy Controller of Currency, Bombay
