= 1941 New Year Honours =

British royal recognitions

The 1941 New Year Honours were appointments by King George VI to various orders and honours to reward and highlight good works by citizens of the United Kingdom and British Empire. They were announced on 31 December 1940.

The recipients of honours are displayed here as they were styled before their new honour.

== United Kingdom and British Empire ==
=== Viscount ===
- William Ewart, Baron Camrose, Editor-in-Chief of The Daily Telegraph.

=== Baron ===
- The Right Honourable Lord Hugh Richard Heathcote Cecil. For public services.
- Field-Marshal Sir (William) Edmund Ironside, G.C.B., C.M.G., D.S.O., Chief of the Imperial General Staff, 1939–40.
- Sir Robert Molesworth Kindersley, G.B.E., President of the National Savings Committee.
- The Right Honourable Sir (Frank) Boyd Merriman, O.B.E., President of the Probate, Divorce and Admiralty Division of the High Court of Justice.

=== Privy Counsellor ===
- Colonel Douglas Clifton Brown, J.P., D.L., M.P., Deputy Chairman of Committees in the House of Commons.
- Sir Walter James Womersley, J.P., M.P., Minister of Pensions.

=== Baronet ===
- Sir William George Coxen, lately Lord Mayor of London.
- Sir Kenneth Lee. For public services.
- Hugh Lett, Esq., C.B.E., M.B., Ch.B., President of the Royal College of Surgeons of England.

=== Knight Bachelor ===
- George Abbiss, Esq., O.B.E., Assistant Commissioner, Metropolitan Police.
- Alderman James Henry Sutherland Aitken, Chairman, Lancashire Education Committee.
- Peter Frederick Blaker Bennett, Esq., O.B.E., J.P., Past President of the Federation of British Industries. Lately Director-General of Tanks and Transport in the Ministry of Supply.
- William Lawrence Bragg, Esq., O.B.E., M.C., F.R.S., Cavendish Professor of Experimental Physics in the University of Cambridge.
- Frank Brangwyn, Esq., R.A., LL.D. For services to Art.
- Alfred William Brown, Esq., LL.D., Principal Assistant Solicitor, Office of H.M. Procurator-General and Treasury Solicitor.
- Arthur Lewis Dixon, Esq., C.B., C.B.E., Assistant Under-Secretary of State, Home Office.
- Patrick Joseph Dollan, Esq., Lord Provost of Glasgow.
- Charles Doughty, Esq., K.C. For services to the Ministry of Labour and National Service and to the Ministry of Pensions.
- George Dyson, Esq., Mus.D., F.R.C.M., Director of the Royal College of Music.
- James Weir French, Esq., D.Sc., Chairman of Messrs Barr and Stroud.
- William John Gick, Esq., C.B., C.B.E., Adviser to the Fourth Sea Lord on Supplies, and lately Director of Stores, Admiralty.
- Hugh Steuart Gladstone, Esq., J.P., D.L., Convener of Dumfriesshire.
- Allan John Grant, Esq., J.P., Managing Director, Messrs Thomas Firth and John Brown, Limited, Sheffield.
- John Harry Hebb, Esq., C.B., O.B.E., M.B., B.Ch., Director-General, Emergency Medical Services, Ministry of Health.
- Randle Fynes Wilson Holme, Esq., President of the Law Society, 1939–40.
- Captain Elias Wynne Cemlyn Jones, Alderman, Anglesey County Council. For public services in Anglesey.
- Patrick Ramsay Laird, Esq., C.B., F.R.S.E., Secretary, Department of Agriculture for Scotland.
- Frederick William Leggett, Esq., C.B., Chief Industrial Commissioner, Ministry of Labour and National Service.
- Ernest John Hutchings Lemon, Esq., O.B.E., M.I.Mech.E. For services to the Air Ministry. A Vice-President of the London, Midland and Scottish Railway Company.
- Charles Lidbury, Esq., Chief General Manager and a Director of the Westminster Bank.
- John Maxwell, Esq., C.B.E., Chief Constable, Manchester.
- Samuel Osborn, Esq., LL.D., J.P., Chairman of the Sheffield Juvenile Advisory Committee.
- Alderman Frank Edwin Newson-Smith, lately Sheriff of London.
- Frank Spencer Spriggs, Esq., Managing Director of the Hawker Siddeley Aircraft Company. President, Society of British Aircraft Constructors, Limited.
- Henry Steele, Esq., Lord Provost of Edinburgh.
- William Bruce Thomas, Esq., K.C., President of the Railway Rates Tribunal.
- John Sealy Edward Townsend, Esq., F.R.S., Wykeham Professor of Physics in the University of Oxford.
- Brigadier-General Julian Mayne Young, C.B., C.M.G., D.S.O., Chief Divisional Food Officer for London and the Home Counties.

Dominions

- Colonel Constantine Trent Champion de Crespigny, D.S.O., V.D., M.D., F.R.C.P., a leading Australian physician. For public services in the Commonwealth of Australia.
- George Francis Davis, Esq. For public services in the Commonwealth of Australia.
- Robert Benson Ewbank, Esq., C.S.I., C.I.E., lately Commissioner for Natural Resources, Newfoundland.
- Lionel Arthur Lindsay, Esq., an eminent artist in the Commonwealth of Australia.
- Fergus McMaster, Esq., Chairman of the Board of Directors of Qantas Empire Airways, Limited. For public services in the Commonwealth of Australia.
- Clive McPherson, Esq., C.B.E., Representative of His Majesty's Government in the Commonwealth of Australia on the British Phosphate Commission.
- The Honourable Robert Dove Nicholls, Speaker of the House of Assembly, State of South Australia.
- Edmund Charles Richards, Esq., C.M.G., Resident Commissioner, Basutoland.
- Professor Robert Strachan Wallace, LL.D., Vice-Chancellor of the University of Sydney, State of New South Wales. For public services in the Commonwealth of Australia.

India

- Manohar Lal, Esq., Finance Minister of His Excellency the Governor of the Punjab.
- Khan Bahadur Maulvi Azizul Haque, C.I.E., M.L.A., Speaker, Bengal Legislative Assembly and Vice-Chancellor, Calcutta University, Bengal.
- Saiyid Fazl Ali, Esq., Puisne Judge of the High Court of Judicature at Patna, Bihar.
- Robert Stonehouse Broomfield, Esq., Barrister-at-Law, Indian Civil Service, Puisne Judge of the High Court of Judicature at Bombay.
- George Hector Thomas, Esq., Barrister-at-Law, Chief Judge, Chief Court of Oudh, United Provinces.
- Godfrey Davis, Esq., Indian Civil Service, Chief Judge, Chief Court, Sind.
- Alexander Cameron Badenoch, Esq., C.S.I., C.I.E., Indian Civil Service, Auditor-General of India.
- James Almond, Esq., Barrister-at-Law, Indian Civil Service, Judicial Commissioner, North-West Frontier Province.
- Hugh Stuart Crosthwaite, Esq., C.I.E., Indian Civil Service (retired), lately Member of the Federal Public Service Commission.
- Colonel Charles Frederick Carson, M.C. (late R.E.), General Manager, Nortih-Western Railway, Lahore, Punjab (on leave).
- Percy Launcelot Orde, Esq., C.I.E., Indian Police, Inspector-General of Police, Punjab.
- Brigadier Clinton Gresham Lewis, O.B.E., Surveyor-General of India.
- Frederick Sayers, Esq., C.I.E., Indian Police, Inspector-General of Police (retired), Madras.
- Frederick Ernest James, Esq., O.B.E., Member of the Central Legislative Assembly.
- Alec Aikman, Esq., C.I.E., lately Leader of the European Group in the Central Legislative Assembly.
- Brevet Colonel Ram Nath Chopra, C.I.E., Indian Medical Service (retired), Professor of Pharmacology and Director, School of Tropical Medicine, Calcutta, Bengal.
- Edmund Lancaster Ball, Esq., Auditor of Indian Home Accounts, India Office, London.
- Shanti Sarup Bhatnagar, Esq., O.B.E., D.Sc., Director of Industrial Development, Advisory Board of Scientific and Industrial Research, and lately Director, University Chemical Laboratories, Lahore, Punjab.
- Robert Charles Bristow, Esq., C.I.E., Administrative Officer and Harbour Engineer-in-Chief, Port of Cochin.
- Harry Harrison Burn, Esq., Senior Director and Chairman, Board of Directors, Messrs McLeod & Co., Ltd., Bengal.
- M. R. Ry. Diwan Bahadur Narsimha Ayyangar Gopalaswami Ayyangar Avargal, C.S.I., C.I.E., Prime Minister, Jammu and Kashmir Government.
- Alexander George Gray, Esq., J.P., Manager, Bank of India, Limited, Bombay.
- Khan Bahadur Syed Maratib Ali, C.B.E., Director of the Central Board of the Reserve Bank of India.
- Colonel Alan Henry Lawrence Mount, C.B., C.B.E., lately Chairman, Pacific Locomotive Committee.
- Diwan Bahadur Khanderao Gangadhar Nadkar, Diwan and President of the Council of Administration (retired), Dhar State, Central India.
- Sorabji Dorabji Saklatvala, Esq., M.L.A., Director, Messrs. Tata Sons, Limited, Bombay.
- Lala Shri Ram, Mill-owner, Delhi.

Burma

- U Thwin, Member of the Senate and Chairman of the Burmese Chamber of Commerce, Rangoon.

Colonies, Protectorates, etc.

- George Gaggero, Esq., O.B.E. For public services in Gibraltar.
- Noel Brooks Livingston, Esq., Custos, Kingston, Jamaica.
- Hanns Vischer, Esq., C.M.G., C.B.E., lately Joint Secretary, Advisory Committee on Education in the Colonies.
- Ambrose Henry Webb, Esq., Colonial Legal Service, Chief Justice, Tanganyika Territory.
- Norman Henry Pownall Whitley, Esq., Colonial Legal Service, Chief Justice, Uganda.
- Wilfrid Murray Wigley, Esq., O.B.E., lately Colonial Legal Service, Chief Justice, Leeward Islands.
- Abraham Charles Gerard Wijeyekoon, Esq. For public services in Ceylon.

=== Order of the Garter (KG) ===
- Edward William Spencer, Duke of Devonshire, M.B.E.

=== Order of the Bath ===
==== Knight Grand Cross of the Order of the Bath (GCB) ====
- General Sir Charles Bonham-Carter, K.C.B., C.M.G., D.S.O., retired pay, Colonel, The Queen's Own Royal West Kent Regiment, Aide-de-Camp General to The King.
- Sir Richard Valentine Nind Hopkins, K.C.B., Second Secretary, H.M. Treasury.
- The Right Honourable Sir Eric Clare Edmund Phipps, G.C.M.G., G.C.V.O. Formerly H.M. Ambassador Extraordinary and Plenipotentiary at Paris.

==== Knight Commander of the Order of the Bath (KCB) ====
- Vice-Admiral Guy Charles Cecil Royle, C.B., C.M.G.
- Vice-Admiral Robert Henry Taunton Raikes, C.B., C.V.O., D.S.O.
- Vioe-Admiral (Acting Admiral) John Cronyn Tovey, C.B., D.S.O.
- Vice-Admiral Sir George Frederick Basset Edward-Collins, K.C.V.O., C.B.
- Paymaster Rear-Admiral David Sydney Lambert, C.B., O.B.E.
- Lieutenant-General George James Giffard, C.B., D.S.O., late The Queen's Royal Regiment (West Surrey).
- Lieutenant-General Robert Harold Carrington, C.B., D.S.O., Colonel Commandant, Royal Artillery, Governor of Edinburgh Castle.
- Colonel Gerald Trevor Bruce, C.B., C.M.G., D.S.O., T.D., D.L., Chairman, Territorial Army and Air Force Association of the County of Glamorgan.
- Air Marshal Ernest Leslie Gossage, C.B., C.V.O., D.S.O., M.C.
- Edward Victor Appleton, Esq., D.Sc., LL.D., F.R.S., Secretary, Department of Scientific and Industrial Research.
- The Honourable Sir Alexander Montagu George Cadogan, G.C.M.G., C.B., Permanent Under-Secretary of State, Foreign Office.
- Charles Northrup McLaren, Esq., Director-General of Ordnance Factories, Ministry of Supply.
- Archibald Rowlands, Esq., M.B.E., Permanent Secretary, Ministry of Aircraft Production.
- Sir Arthur William Street, K.B.E., C.B., C.M.G., C.I.E., M.C., Permanent Under-Secretary of State, Air Ministry.

==== Companion of the Order of the Bath (CB) ====
Military Division

- Rear-Admiral Stuart Sumner Bonham-Carter, C.V.O., D.S.O.
- Rear-Admiral John Guy Protheroe Vivian.
- Rear-Admiral Arthur Lumley St George Lyster, C.V.O., D.S.O.
- Rear-Admiral Eric Ritchie Bent, D.S.C. (Retired).
- Rear-Admiral Frederick Arthur Buckley (Retired).
- Engineer Rear-Admiral Macleod Gamul Arthur Edwards, O.B.E.
- Temporary Surgeon Rear-Admiral Cecil Pembrey Grey Wakeley, D.Sc., F.R.C.S., F.A.C.S., F.R.A.C.S.
- Major-General Thomas Lionel Hunton, M.V.O., O.B.E., Royal Marines.
- Major-General (acting Lieutenant-General) Thomas Jacomb Hutton, M.C., late Royal Artillery.
- Major-General (acting lieutenant-General) Alan Gordon Cunningham, D.S.O., M.C., late Royal Artillery.
- Major-General (acting Lieutenant-General) Maurice Fitzgibbon Grove-White, D.S.O., O.B.E., late Royal Engineers.
- Major-General (acting Lieutenant-General) Thomas Ralph Eastwood, D.S.O., M.O., late The King's Royal Rifle Corps.
- Major-General John Walter Lennox Scott, D.S.O., late Royal Army Medical Corps, Honorary Physician to The King.
- Major-General Robert Walter Dickson Leslie, O.B.E., late Royal Army Medical Corps, Honorary Physician to The King.
- Major-General Vivian Henry Bruce Majendie, D.S.O., Colonel, The Somerset Light Infantry (Prince Albert's).
- Major-General Charles John Wallace, D.S.O., O.B.E., M.C., late The Highland Light Infantry (City of Glasgow Regiment).
- Major-General the Honourable Percy Gerald Scarlett, M.C., late The Buffs (Royal East Kent Regiment).
- Major-General Lancelot Daryl Hickes, O.B.E., M.C., late Royal Artillery.
- Major-General Bevil Thomson Wilson, D.S.O., late Royal Engineers.
- Major-General Edwin Logie Morris, O.B.E., M.C., late Royal Engineers.
- Colonel (temporary Brigadier) William Archibald Kenneth Fraser, C.B.E., D.S.O., M.V.O., M.C., Indian Army.
- Colonel (temporary Brigadier) William Henry Goldney Baker, D.S.O., O.B.E., Indian Army, Aide-de-Camp to The King.
- Colonel (temporary Brigadier) Thomas William Corbett, M.C., Indian Army.
- Major-General John Northcott, M.V.O., Deputy-Chief of the General Staff, Australian Military Forces.
- Acting Air Marshal Philip Babington, M.C., A.F.C.
- Acting Air Marshal Alfred Guy Roland Garrod, O.B.E., M.C., D.F.C.
- Air Vice-Marshal Paul Copeland Maltby, D.S.O., A.F.C.
- Air Vice-Marshal Richard Hallam Peck, O.B.E.
- Acting Air Vice-Marshal Rey Griffith Parry, D.S.O.
- Acting Air Vice-Marshal James Milne Robb, D.S.O., D.F.C., A.F.C.

Civil Division

- James Scott Pringle, Esq., O.B.E., A.C.G.I., M.I.E.E.
- Alfred Baikie, Esq., President and Chairman, Territorial Army Association of the County of Orkney, and Chairman, Territorial Army Association of the County of Zetland.
- Major John Telfer Dunbar, D.L., Chairman, Territorial Army and Air Force Association of the County of the City of Edinburgh.
- Major Delaval Graham L'Estrange Astley, D.L., Chairman, Territorial Army Association of the County of Norfolk.
- Ernest Holloway, Esq., O.B.E., Director of Works, Air Ministry.
- Eric Norman de Normann, Esq., Principal Assistant Secretary, Ministry of Works and Buildings.
- Ralph George Hawtrey, Esq., F.B.A., Assistant Secretary and Director of Financial Enquiries, H.M. Treasury.
- Godfrey Herbert Ince, Esq., Under-Secretary, Ministry of Labour and National Service.
- Thomas Gilmour Jenkins, Esq., M.C., Second Secretary, Ministry of Shipping.
- William Thomas Matthews, Esq., O.B.E., Principal Assistant Secretary, Assistance Board.
- Robert Leslie Overbury, Esq., Assistant Clerk of the Parliaments, House of Lords.
- Sidney Hill Phillips, Esq., Principal Assistant Secretary, Admiralty.
- Frederick Percival Robinson, Esq., Financial Secretary to H.M. The King.
- Arthur Nevil Rucker, Esq., C.B.E. Lately Principal Private Secretary to the Prime Minister (the late Right Honourable Neville Chamberlain, M.P.).
- Thomas Herbert Sheepshanks, Esq., Principal Assistant Secretary, Ministry of Home Security.
- Robert Hill Tolenton, Esq., C.B.E., D.S.O., M.C., Principal Assistant Secretary, Ministry of Transport.
- Robert Alexander Watson Watt, Esq., Scientific Adviser on Telecommunications, Ministry of Aircraft Production.
- John Joseph Wills, Esq., C.B.E., Principal Assistant Secretary, Board of Trade.
- John Crompton Wrigley, Esq., Principal Assistant Secretary, Ministry of Health.

=== Order of Merit (OM) ===
- Professor (George) Gilbert Aimé Murray, M.A., D.Litt., D.C.L., LL.D., F.B.A., F.R.S.L.

=== Order of the Star of India ===
==== Knight Grand Commander of the Order of the Star of India (GCSI) ====
- Major His Highness Rukn-ud-Daula Nusrat-i-Jang, Saif-ud-Daula Hafiz-ul-Mulk Mukhlis-ud-Daula wa Muin-ud-Daula Nawab al Haj Sir Sadiq Muhammad Khan, Abbasi, Bahadur, G.C.I.E., K.C.S.I., K.C.V.O., LL.D, Nawab of Bahawalpur.

==== Knight Commander of the Order of the Star of India (KCSI) ====
- Lieutenant His Highness Raja Har Indar Singh Bahadur, Raja of Faridkot.
- Sir Francis Lewis Castle Floud, K.C.B., K.C.M.G., Chairman, Land Revenue Commission, Bengal.
- Sir Chetput Pattabhirama Ayyar Ramaswami Ayyar, K.C.I.E., Diwan, Travanoore State.

==== Companion of the Order of the Star of India (CSI) ====
- Robert Edwin Russell, Esq., C.I.E., Indian Civil Service,. Adviser to His Excellency the Governor of Bihar.
- Henry Challen Greenfield, Esq., C.I.E., Indian Civil Service, Adviser to His Excellency the Governor of the Central Provinces and Berar.
- Charles MacIvor Grant Ogilvie, Esq., C.B.E., Indian Civil Service, Secretary to the Government of India in the Defence Department.
- Olaf Kirkpatrick Caroe, Esq., C.I.E., Indian Political Service, Secretary to the Government of India in the External Affairs Department.
- Evan Meredith Jenkins, Esq., C.I.E., Indian Civil Service, Secretary to the Government of India in the Department of Supply, and lately Chief Commissioner, Delhi.
- John Bartley, Esq., C.I.E., Indian Civil Service, Additional Secretary and Draftsman to the Government of India in the Legislative Department.
- Godfrey Ferdinando Stratford Collins, Esq., C.I.E., O.B.E., Indian Civil Service, Chief Secretary to the Government of Bombay, and lately Revenue Commissioner and Revenue Secretary, Sind.
- Major-General Hugh Clive Buckley, M.D., F.R.C.S., K.H.P., Indian Medical Service, lately Surgeon-General with the Government of Bombay.
- Frank Lugard Brayne, Esq., C.I.E., M.C., Indian Civil Service, Financial Commissioner, Development, Punjab.
- Robert Francis Mudie, Esq., C.I.E., O.B.E., Indian Civil Service, Chief Secretary to the Government of the United Provinces.
- Philip Theodore Mansfield, Esq., C.I.E., Indian Civil Service, Chief Secretary to the Government of Orissa (on leave).
- Cyril Walter Gurner, Esq., Indian Civil Service, Chairman, Calcutta Improvement Trust, Bengal.

=== Order of St Michael and St George ===
==== Knight Grand Cross of the Order of St Michael and St George (GCMG) ====
- Sir Harold Alfred MacMichael, K.C.M.G., D.S.O., High Commissioner and Commander-in-Chief for Palestine and High Commissioner for Trans-Jordan.
- The Right Honourable Sir Robert Leslie Craigie, K.C.M.G., C.B., His Majesty's Ambassador Extraordinary and Plenipotentiary at Tokyo.

==== Knight Commander of the Order of St Michael and St George (KCMG) ====
- The Honourable Owen Dixon, Judge of the High Court of the Commonwealth of Australia.
- The Honourable Godfrey Martin Huggins, F.R.C.S., Prime Minister of Southern Rhodesia since 1933. On the occasion of the Jubilee celebrations of the Colony.
- The Honourable Bertram Sydney Barnsdale Stevens, M.L.A., formerly Premier of the State of New South Wales.
- William Denis Battershill, Esq., C.M.G., Governor and Commander-in-Chief, Cyprus.
- John Hathorn Hall, Esq., C.M.G., D.S.O., O.B.E., M.C., British Resident, Zanzibar Protectorate.
- Major Sir William Chollerton Lead, M.C. For public services in the Tanganyika Territory.
- Angus Somerville Fletcher, Esq., C.B.E., Director of the British Library of Information, New York.
- David John Montagu-Douglas-Scott, Esq., C.M.G., an Assistant Under-Secretary of State in the Foreign Office.
- Lieutenant-Colonel John Henry Maitland Greenly, C.B.E., M.I.Mech.E., formerly Controller General, British Supply Board in Canada, and Chairman of the Prime Minister's Panel of Industrialists, 1938–39.
- Frank Horsfall Nixon, Esq., C.B., General Manager and Chief Underwriter, Export Credits Guarantee Department, and Joint Managing Director, United Kingdom Commercial Corporation, Limited.
- Sir Ashley Sparks, K.B.E., Ministry of Shipping Representative in the United States.

==== Companion of the Order of St Michael and St George (CMG) ====
- Hugh Traill Armitage, Esq., Deputy Governor of the Commonwealth Bank of Australia. For public services in the Commonwealth of Australia.
- Charles Bullock, Esq., Secretary for Native Affairs, Chief Native Commissioner and Director of Native Development, Southern Rhodesia.
- Charles Noble Arden Clarke, Esq., Resident Commissioner, Bechuanaland Protectorate.
- Edward Parkes, Esq., M.V.O., I.S.O., Under-secretary, Chief Electoral Officer, Chief Secretary's Department, and Clerk to the Executive Council, State of Tasmania.
- Frederick Geoffrey Shedden, Esq., O.B.E., Secretary, Department of Defence, Commonwealth of Australia.
- John Everard Stephenson, Esq., C.V.O., O.B.E., Assistant Undersecretary of State, Dominions Office.
- Arthur Maurice Wiseman, Esq., M.C., His Majesty's Senior Trade Commissioner in the Dominion of Canada.
- Wallace Charles Wurth, Esq., Chairman of the Public Service Board, State of New South Wales.
- Bernard Traugott Zwar, Esq., M.D., M.S., F.R.A.C.S., President, Royal Melbourne Hospital, State of Victoria. For public services.
- Ralph Clarence Morris, Esq., Inspector-General of Police, Burma.
- Major Ferdinand William Cavendish-Bentinck, D.S.O. For public services in Kenya.
- Sze Jen Chan, Esq. For public services in the Straits Settlements.
- William Henry Flinn, Esq., O.B.E., Colonial Administrative Service, Colonial Secretary, Barbados.
- Leslie Brian Freeston, Esq., O.B.E., Colonial Administrative Service, Chief Secretary, Tanganyika Territory.
- Gerard Edward James Gent, Esq., D.S.O., O.B.E., M.C., Assistant Secretary, Colonial Office.
- Oliver Ernest Goonetilleke, Esq., Auditor-General, Ceylon.
- Alexander William George Herder Grantham, Esq., Colonial Administrative Service, Colonial Secretary, Jamaica.
- Joseph Welsh Park Harkness, Esq., O.B.E., M.B., B.Ch., D.P.H., Colonial Medical Service, Director of Medical Services, Gold Coast.
- Walter Harragin, Esq., Colonial Legal Service, Attorney-General, Kenya.
- James Richard Mackie, Esq., Colonial Agricultural Service, Director of Agriculture, Nigeria.
- James Scott Neill, Esq., Colonial Administrative Service, Administrator, Dominica, Windward Islands.
- Edgar Stanley Pembleton, Esq., Colonial Administrative Service, Senior Resident, Nigeria.
- Marcus Rex, Esq., Colonial Administrative Service, British Resident, Perak, Federated Malay States.
- Major Alan Saunders, O.B.E., M.C., Colonial Police Service, Inspector-General of Police and Prisons, Palestine.
- Archibald Guelph Holdsworth Smart, Esq., M.B.E., M.D., D.P.H., Assistant Medical Adviser to the Secretary of State for the Colonies.
- Charles Robert Smith, Esq., Principal Representative in North Borneo of the British North Borneo (Chartered) Company.
- Hugh Whitelegge Thomas, Esq., Colonial Administrative Service, Secretary for Native Affairs, Gold Coast.
- Algernon Edward Vere Walwyn, Esq., Colonial Administrative Service, Senior Resident, Nigeria.
- John Balfour, Esq., a Counsellor in the Foreign Office.
- Ernest Francis Withers Besley, Esq., Legal Adviser to His Majesty's Embassy in Cairo.
- Cecil John Edmonds, Esq., C.B.E., Adviser to the Ministry of the Interior, Iraq.
- Godfrey Arthur Fisher, Esq., formerly His Majesty's Consul-General at Antwerp.
- Captain Francis Edward Foley. For services rendered to the Foreign Office.
- Victor Courtenay Walter Forbes, Esq., His Majesty's Envoy Extraordinary and Minister Plenipotentiary at Lima.
- John Henry Jones, Esq., O.B.E., a Director in the Department of Overseas Trade.
- Gordon Thompson Maclean, Esq., one of His Majesty's Inspectors-General of Consulates.
- Eric Denholm Pridie, Esq., D.S.O., O.B.E., Director of the Sudan Medical Service.
- James William Stafford, Esq., O.B.E., Director of the Passport and Permit Office.
- Robert Thomson Leiper, Esq., D.Sc., M.D., F.R.S., F.R.C.P., Professor of Helminthology in the University of London and a Director of the Department of Parasitology, London School of Hygiene and Tropical Medicine.
- David John Lidbury, Esq., D.S.O., lately Chairman of the First Commission of the Buenos Aires International Postal Congress, 1939. Regional Director, London Postal Region.
- Charles Brinsley Pemberton Peake, Esq., M.C., Chief Press Adviser to the Minister of Information.
- Robert Jones Shackle, Esq., Assistant Secretary, Board of Trade.
- Charles Norman Stirling, Esq., Head of the Neutral Trade Department, Ministry of Economic Warfare.

=== Order of the Indian Empire ===
==== Knight Grand Commander of the Order of the Indian Empire (GCIE) ====
- Sir Henry Duffield Craik, Bt., K.C.S.I., Governor of the Punjab.
- His Highness Maharaja Mukhtar-ul-Mulk, Azim-ul-Iqtidar, Rafi-ush-Shan, Wala Shikoh, Mohtasham-i-Dauran, Umdat-ul-Umara, Maharajadhiraja Alijah Hisam-us-Saltanat George Jivaji Rao Scindia Bahadur, Shrinath Mansur-i-Zaman, Fidwi-i-Hazrat-i-Malik-i-Muazzam-i-Rafi-ud-Darjat-i-Inglistan, Maharaja of Gwalior.
- His Highness Farzand-i-Khas-i-Daulat-i-Inglishia Maharaja Pratap Singh Gaekwar Sena Khas Khel Shamsher Bahadur, Maharaja of Baroda.

==== Knight Commander of the Order of the Indian Empire (KCIE) ====
- His Highness Raja Vikram Singh, Raja of Narsingarh, Central India.
- Major His Highness Nasir ul-Mulk, Mehtar of Chitral.
- Raja Shrimant Raghunathrao Shankarrao Pandit Pant Sachiv, Raja of Bhor.
- George Townsend Boag, Esq., C.S.I., C.I.E., Indian Civil Service, Adviser to His Excellency the Governor of Madras.
- John Gilbert Laithwaite, Esq., C.S.I., C.I.E., Secretary to the Governor-General (Personal), and Private Secretary to the Viceroy.
- Kenneth Samuel Fitze, Esq., C.I.E., Indian Political Service, Secretary to His Excellency the Crown Representative, and lately Resident for Central India.
- Major-General Ernest William Charles Bradfield, C.I.E., O.B.E., Indian Medical Service, Medical Adviser to the Secretary of State for India, and lately Director-General, Indian Medical Service.

==== Companion of the Order of the Indian Empire (CIE) ====
- Sardar Bahadur Sardar Mohan Singh, lately Adviser to the Secretary of State for India.
- Lieutenant-Colonel Walter Fendall Campbell, Indian Political Service, Adviser to His Excellency the Governor of the North-West Frontier Province.
- Arthur Vivian Askwith, Esq., Indian Civil Service, Chief Commissioner, Delhi, and lately Secretary to the Government of the Punjab in the Home Department.
- Brigadier Ernest Wood, M.C., Director-General, Department of Supply, Government of India.
- Major-General William Henry McNeile Verschoyle-Campbell, O.B.E., M.C., Director of Ordnance Services, Army Headquarters, India.
- Denys Pilditch, Esq., Indian Police, Director, Intelligence Bureau, Home Department, Government of India.
- George Milne Harper, Esq., Indian Civil Service, Senior Member, Board of Revenue, United Provinces.
- Charles Alexander Muirhead, Esq., Agent and General Manager, South Indian Railway.
- John David Westwood, Esq., Agent and General Manager, Bengal and North-Western Railway, Gorakhpur.
- John Whitcombe Hearn, Esq., Indian Civil Service, Commissioner, Lahore Division, Punjab.
- William Robert Tennant, Esq., Indian Civil Service, Deputy Auditor-General of India.
- Thomas Cooke Samuel Jayaratnam, Esq., Indian Civil Service, Commissioner (officiating), Jubbulpore Division, Central Provinces and Berar.
- Sidney Lionel Marwood, Esq., Indian Civil Service Commissioner (officiating) Patna Division, Bihar.
- Yeshwant Anant Godbole, Esq., Indian Civil Service, Chief Secretary to the Government of Bihar.
- Major Thomas Faulkner Borwick, D.S.O., Director of Ordnance Factories, India.
- David Alexander Smyth, Esq., C.B.E., Indian Police, Inspector-General of Police (officiating), Central Provinces and Berar.
- Colonel (Temporary Brigadier) George Adrien Pirn, Commandant, Officers' Training School, Belgaum.
- Alakh Kumar Sinha, Esq., O.B.E., Indian Police, Inspector-General of Police, Bihar (retired).
- Ivon Hope Taunton, Esq., Indian Civil Service, Revenue Commissioner and Revenue Secretary, Sind, and lately Chief Secretary to the Government of Sind.
- Nilakanta Mahadeva Ayyar, Esq., Indian Civil Service, Chairman, Coal Mines Stowing Board, Government of India.
- James Philip Mills, Esq., Indian Civil Service, Secretary to His Excellency the Governor of Assam.
- Haravu Venkatamarasimh Varada Raj Iengar, Esq., Indian Civil Service, Secretary to the Government of Bombay in the Finance Department.
- Benjamin George Holdsworth, Esq., Indian Civil Service, Secretary to the Government of Madras in the Revenue Department.
- William Christie, Esq., M.C., Indian Civil Service, Secretary to the Government of the United Provinces in the Finamce Department.
- Francis Archibald Farquharson, Esq., M.C., Indian Service of Engineers, Chief Engineer and Secretary to the Government of the Punjab in the Public Works Department, Irrigation Branch.
- Noel Victor Housman Symons, Esq., M.C., Indian, Civil Service, Secretary to the Government of Bengal in the Revenue Department.
- Frederick Chalmers Bourne, Esq., Indian Civil Service, Secretary to the Government of the Punjab in the Home Department, and lately Deputy Commissioner, Lahore, Punjab.
- Archibald Macdonald Livingstone, Esq., M.C., Agricultural Marketing Adviser to the Government of India.
- Francis Michael Dowley, Esq., Indian Service of Engineers, Chief Engineer for Irrigation, Public Works Department, Madras (on leave).
- Arthur Oram, Esq., Indian Service of Engineers, Chief Engineer, Public Works Department, North-West Frontier Province.
- Douglas John Blomfield, Esq., Indian Service of Engineers, Chief Engineer, Communications and Works Department (Communications and Buildings Branch), Bengal.
- Lionel Fielden, Esq., lately Controller of Broadcasting, Government of India.
- Cecil Claude Wilson, Esq., V.D., Indian Forest Service, Chief Conservator of Forests (retired), Madras.
- Shamaldhari Lall, Esq., Indian Civil Service, Deputy High Commissioner for India, London.
- Basil John Knight Hallowes, Esq., Indian Civil Service, Commissioner, Ajmer-Merwara.
- Stanley Paul Chambers, Esq., lately Income Tax Adviser to the Central Board of Revenue, Government of India.
- Shavax Ardeshir Lal, Esq., Deputy Secretary to the Government of India in the Legislative Department, and Secretary of the Council of State.
- Henry James Frampton, Esq., M.C., Indian Civil Service, Deputy Secretary to the Government of India in the Home Department.
- Major Cyril Percy Hancock, O.B.E., M.C., Indian Political Service, Deputy Secretary, Political Department.
- Reginald Edwin Anthony Ray, Esq., Indian Police, Deputy Inspector-General, Intelligence Branch, Bengal.
- Hugh Weightman, Esq., Indian Political Service, Deputy Secretary to the Government of India in the External Affairs Department, and lately Political Agent, Bahrain.
- Lieutenant-Colonel Henry Edward Short, Indian Medical Service, Director, King Institute, Guindy, Madras.
- Lieutenant-Colonel Henry Hawes Elliot, M.B.E., M.C., M.B., B.S., M.R.C.S., F.R.C.S., D.M.R.E., Indian Medical Service, Surgeon to His Excellency the Viceroy.
- Lieutenant-Colonel David Clyde, M.D., D.P.H., Indian Medical Service, Civil Surgeon, Lucknow, United Provinces.
- Cuthbert George Milford Mackarness, Esq., Indian Forest Service, Conservator of Forests, Assam.
- Lieutenant-Colonel Walter Hugh Crichton, Indian Medical Service, Chief Health Officer, Delhi.
- John Aldhelm Raikes Bromage, Esq., lately Superintending Engineer, Health Services, Delhi.
- Harry George Champion, Esq., Indian Forest Service, lately Conservator of Forests, United Provinces.
- Surendra Nath Das Gupta, Esq., PhD, D.Litt., Indian Educational Service, Principal, Government Sanskrit College, Calcutta, Bengal.
- Rao Bahadur Ranchhodbhai Bhaibabbai Patel, Barrister-at-Law, Prothonotary and Senior Master, High Court of Judicature, Bombay.
- Richard Marsh Crofton, Esq., Indian Civil Service, Director-General and Secretary, Revenue Department, His Exalted Highness the Nizam's Government, Hyderabad, Deccan.
- Percy Stuart Macdonald, Esq., General Manager, Thomas Duff & Co., Calcutta.
- Arthur Stanley Trollip, Esq., General Manager, Bombay Electric Supply and Tramways Co., Ltd., Bombay.
- Bashir Husain Zaidi, Esq., Chief Minister, Rampur State.

=== Royal Victorian Order ===
==== Knight Commander of the Royal Victorian Order (KCVO) ====
- Sir Ulick Roland Burke.
- Lieutenant-Colonel Walter Gordon Neale, C.I.E., C.V.O.

==== Commander of the Royal Victorian Order (CVO) ====
- Colonel Frank Benson, C.B.E.
- Charles Craik Cunningham, Esq.
- Captain Fitzroy Hubert Fyers, M.V.O.
- Edmund Claud Malden, Esq., M.B., B.Ch., M.R.C.S., L.R.C.P.
- Cornelius James Selway, Esq., C.B.E., T.D.
- Cecil George Lewis Syers, Esq.
- Lieutenant-Colonel Charles Hyde Villiers, T.D.

==== Member of the Royal Victorian Order (MVO) ====
At this time the two lowest classes of the Royal Victorian Order were "Member (fourth class)" and "Member (fifth class)", both with post-nominals MVO. "Member (fourth class)" was renamed "Lieutenant" (LVO) from the 1985 New Year Honours onwards.

Fourth Class

- Commander (now Captain) the Honourable Edward Pleydell-Bouverie, R.N.
- Albert Canning, Esq., O.B.E.
- Major Alfred Francis Custance.
- Henry Clement Game, Esq., O.B.E.
- George Proctor Middleton, Esq., M.B., Ch.B.
- Miss Violet Roberta Stewart-Richardson, O.B.E.
- Commander Derek Howard Seeker, R.N.
- Thomas Blundell Turner, Esq.
- Robert James Wallace, Esq.

Fifth Class

- Hubert Christopher Randolph Calver, Esq.
- James Charles Edward Cole, Esq.
- Frank Vaughan, Esq.
- Charles Ralph Warren, Esq.

=== Order of the British Empire ===
==== Knight Grand Cross of the Order of the British Empire (GBE) ====
- Sir Thomas Robert Gardiner, K.C.B., K.B.E.,. Director General of the Post Office. Lately Joint Secretary, Ministry of Home Security.
- Sir (William) Arthur Robinson, G.C.B., C.B.E., lately Secretary, Ministry of Supply.

==== Dame Commander of the Order of the British Empire (DBE) ====
- Irene, Mrs Dion Boucicault (Miss Irene Vanbrugh). For services to the Stage.
- Cecil Mary Nowell Dering, Viscountess Craigavon
- Stella, Dowager Marchioness of Reading, Chairman, Women's Voluntary Services for Civil Defence.
- Reniera, Lady Stanley. For public and social welfare services in Southern Rhodesia.

==== Knight Commander of the Order of the British Empire (KBE) ====
- Vice-Admiral Richard Augustus Sandys Hill, C.B., C.B.E. (Retired).
- Vice-Admiral Clinton Francis Samuel Danby, C.B.
- Major-General (local Lieutenant-General) Dudley Stuart Collins, C.B., D.S.O., Colonel Commandant, Royal Engineers.
- Captain Arthur Routley Hutson Morrell, J.P., Deputy Master of the Corporation of Trinity House.
- William Palmer, Esq., C.B., Second Secretary, Ministry of Supply.
- Kenneth Oswald Peppiatt, Esq., M.C., Chief Cashier, Bank of England.
- Sir Allan Gordon Gordon-Smith, D.L., Managing Director, S. Smith and Sons (Motor Accessories) Limited.
- John Smale Sutton, Esq., C.B., Deputy Chairman, Board of Customs and Excise.
- Donald Edward Vandepeer, Esq., Second Secretary, Ministry of Agriculture and Fisheries.
- Edwin Mortimer Drower, Esq., C.B.E., Adviser to the Ministry of Justice, Iraq, and Judge of the Iraqi Courts.
- Harold Winthrop Clapp, Esq., M.Inst.E.E. For public services in the Commonwealth of Australia.
- Lieutenant-Colonel Frank William Frederick Johnson, D.S.O., a pioneer of Southern Rhodesia. For public services to the Colony.
- Vincent Strickland Jones, Esq., O.B.E., Vice-President and General Manager of the Anglo-Newfoundland Development Company, Limited. For services to Newfoundland.
- Geoffrey Syme, Esq. For services to journalism in the Commonwealth of Australia.
- Sir Homi Mehta, Director of the Central Board of the Reserve Bank of India.
- Maxwell MacLagan Wedderburn, Esq., C.M.G., lately Colonial Administrative Service, Chief Secretary, Ceylon.

=== Order of the Companions of Honour (CH) ===
- James Louis Garvin, Esq., LL.D., Litt.D., Editor of The Observer.
- The Right Honourable William Morris Hughes, D.C.L., LL.D., K.C., Minister for the Navy and Attorney-General, Commonwealth of Australia.
- Arthur Henry Mann, Esq., lately Editor of The Yorkshire Post.

=== Kaisar-i-Hind Gold Medal for public services in India ===
==== Bar to the Kaisar-i-Hind Gold Medal ====
- Olive, Mrs Monahan (wife of the Reverend C. H. Monahan of the Wesleyan Mission), Chief Medical Officer (retired), Kalyani Hospital, Madras.

==== Kaisar-i-Hind Gold Medal ====
- Katharine Isobel, Lady Lumley (wife of Sir Roger Lumley, G.C.I.E., T.D., Governor of Bombay).
- Gladys, Lady Hallett (wife of Sir Maurice Hallett, K.C.S.I, C.I.E., Governor of the United Provinces).
- Shrimant Soubhagyavati Lilawatibaisaheb Patwardhan, Ranisaheb of Jamkhandi.
- Dorothy Kate, Mrs Barne, M.B.E. (wife of the Right Reverend G. D. Barne, C.I.E., O.B.E., Bishop of Lahore), Punjab.
- Miss Elizabeth Jane Colhoun, Irish Presbyterian Zenana Mission, Rajkot, Western India States Agency.
- Charlotte, Mrs Cooper, Chief Commissioner, Girl Guides Association, Bengal.
- Miss Reba Cuthbert Hunsberger, M.D., Lady Doctor-in-Charge, Memorial Hospital for Women and Children, Sialkot City, Punjab.
- Daisy Elizabeth, Mrs Munro, M.B.E., Lady Superintendent, Civil Hospital, Karachi, Sind.
- Vidyagauri, Lady Ramambhai Nilkanth, M.B.E. widow of the late Sir Ramanbhai Mahipatram Nilkanth), Ahmedabad, Bombay.
- Khadija, Mrs Shuffi Cumruddin Tyabji (widow of the late Mr Shuffi Tyabji, Merchant, Bombay), Member of the Legislative Assembly, Bombay.
- Robert Greenhill Cochrane, Esq., M.D., M.R.C.P., Medical Superintendent, Lady Willingdon Leper Settlement, Chingleput, Madras.
- The Reverend James John Ellis, Wesleyan Methodist Missionary Society, Dharapuram, Coimibatore District, Madras.
- Sardar Bahadur Raja Jeoraj Singh, of Sandwa, C.B.E., O.B.I., Major-General in the Bikaner State Forces, Member, Executive Council, Bikaner State, Rajputana.
- Lieutenant William Patrick Smythe Mitchell, M.B.E., Indian Medical Department, Chief Medical Officer, Bastar State.
- Lieutenant-Colonel Joseph Lockhart Downes Yule, Indian Medical Service, lately Officer Commanding, Indian Military Hospital, Delhi Cantonments.
