= Elizabeth Alexandria Menzies =

British historian (1928–2008)

Elizabeth Alexandria Menzies (1928–2008) was a temporary lecturer in History at the University College, Dundee (1952–1956) and the third woman to be awarded a PhD in History from the University of St Andrews in 1954. She attended the High School of Dundee.

== Career ==
Menzies began her academic career in June 1949 when she achieved an Honours M.A in History and English from the University of St Andrews. She then went on to begin a PhD in October 1949 and was supported in her research by the Carnegie Scholarship from 1950 to 1952, which also assisted fellow notable female PhD students Edith MacQueen and Edith Thomson. Her thesis, published a quarter of a century after the first two women PhDs, was entitled "A study of Anglo-Scottish relations, 1637–43" and her supervisor was Sir Charles Ogilvie. Menzies also held a University Fellowship of the Institute of Historical Research, London, during this time.

Menzies held a position as a temporary lecturer within the Department of History at University College, Dundee from 1952 to 1956. Within her cohort of seminal female PhD candidates, Menzies appears to be the only woman to be engaged in a teaching position while also working towards her PhD.

Menzies was born in 1928. She died in 2008.
