= Arthur Morrell =

Arthur Morrell may refer to:

- Arthur Fleming Morrell (1788–1880), British naval officer, explorer, and colonial administrator of Ascension Island
- Arthur R. H. Morrell (1878–1968), mariner and member of the Corporation of Trinity House
