= General Poole =

General Poole may refer to:

- Frederick Poole (1869–1936), British Army major general
- Gerald Robert Poole (1868–1937), Royal Marines lieutenant general
- Roger C. Poole (born 1936), South Carolina Militia brevet major general
