= Edith Thomson =

British historian

Edith Elizabeth Bruce Thomson was a British historian that specialized in early-modern Scottish political history. She was the second woman to be awarded a Ph.D. in History from the University of St Andrews.

== Academic career ==
Thomson started her undergraduate studies at the University of St Andrews in October 1919. She graduated with First Class Honours in English and History in October 1923. In June 1924, Thomson was elected for the two-year-long Berry Research Scholarship in History.

In October 1924, she began Postgraduate Modern and Mediaeval History studies at the University of St Andrews. In March 1926, she was awarded the Hume Brown Essay Prize for the essay titled ‘The Scottish Parliament 1690-1702’. In July 1926 Thomson won a Research Fellowship from the Carnegie Trust to aid with research for her Ph.D. thesis; the Fellowship was renewed in July 1927.

Thomson graduated with Honours of the Second Class in 1928. She became the second woman to be awarded a Ph.D. in History at St Andrews, following Edith MacQueen, who was awarded her Ph.D. one year earlier. Her thesis, titled ‘Scotland under Lauderdale’, was supervised by John W. Williams.

After completing her Ph.D, Thomson received a Commonwealth visiting fund fellowship to Yale University and spent at least two years at the institution.
