= Dorothy Lamb =

British archaeologist

Dorothy Brooke Nicholson MBE
- Born: Dorothy Lamb; 4 October 1887; Manchester, England
- Died: 1967 (aged 79–80)
- Occupation: Archaeologist
- Spouses: Sir John Reeve Brooke; Sir Walter Nicholson

Academic background
- Education: Manchester High School for Girls; Wycombe Abbey; Newnham College, Cambridge

Academic work
- Discipline: Classical archaeology
- Institutions: British School at Athens; Bryn Mawr College
- Notable works: Catalogue of the Acropolis Museum (Vols. 1 & 2)

Lady (Dorothy) Brooke Nicholson, MBE (1887–1967), better known by her maiden name Dorothy Lamb, was a British archaeologist and writer known for her catalogue of terracotta in the Acropolis Museum, Athens and her work in Mediterranean field archaeology.

== Early life and education ==
Dorothy Lamb was born in Manchester on 4 October 1887, to the mathematician Sir Horace Lamb and his wife Elizabeth. Her siblings included the classicist Walter Lamb and the painter Henry Lamb. Her nephew was the climatologist Hubert Lamb and her great-nephew was the Liberal Democrat politician Norman Lamb.

Lamb was educated at Manchester High School and Wycombe Abbey boarding school. She later attended Newnham College, Cambridge, where she read classics from 1906 to 1910 and graduating with honors. Encouraged by Jane Harrison, Lamb travelled to Greece and was accepted as a student of the British School at Athens from 1910 to 1911.

== Archaeological career ==
In 1910 Lamb was in Athens working on a catalogue of the Greek terracotta figurines in the Acropolis Museum, a project the British School initiated on behalf of the Acropolis Museum. In 1911 she participated in excavations at Phylakopi on Melos. Lamb, Lillian Tennant and Hilda Lorimer were the first women to participate in an excavation conducted by the British School at Athens. The excavation, led by Richard Dawkins, the director of the British School, was conducted from March to May 1911, with Lamb and Tennant beginning fieldwork after 16 April. The project was a supplementary excavation of a site that had been explored in 1896–1899.

The start of the First Balkan War in 1912 ended archaeological fieldwork plans in Greece. Lamb returned to England, first stopping in Paris to do additional research on the terracottas at the Louvre. She finished her work on her catalogue in 1912 and the first volume, edited by Guy Dickens, was published that year by Cambridge University Press. The British School's publications committee recommended revisions, so Lamb continued to work on the second volume of the Catalogue from 1912 to 1914.

Later in 1912, Lamb travelled to the United States and spent a year lecturing on classical archaeology at Bryn Mawr College. From 1913 to 1914, as recipient of Newnham College's Mary Ewart Travelling Scholarship, Lamb returned to Athens to continue work on the revisions to her catalogue. During this time period she also traveled to Paris, Rome and Turkey, continuing her studies in classical archaeology and art. She also participated in the American Archaeological Expedition to Melas in Greece in 1913 and 1914.

Although Lamb began a study of Islamic architecture in Konya between 1914 and 1916, the outbreak of the First World War "brought a promising academic career to an end". In 1916 Lamb was living in England working for the British government. She worked as an assistant in the Ministry of National Service (1916–1918) and the Ministry of Food (1918–1920). She then became secretary to the London Committee Supreme Economic Council. In 1919 she was appointed a Member of the Order of the British Empire (MBE).

Due to the war and the death of the Acropolis Museum catalogue's first editor Guy Dickens, the second volume was not published until 1921. After the war, Lamb no longer participated in fieldwork, but continued to research and write, with an edition of Private Letters in translation published in 1933, Pilgrims were they All in 1937, and other published work from the 1920s through to the 1940s that reflected her continuing interest in classical art and architecture.

== Personal life ==
Lamb married Sir John Reeve Brooke in 1920.

Brooke died in 1937, and in 1939 Lamb remarried to Sir Walter Nicholson. She was widowed again in 1946 and died in 1967.

== Awards ==
- Creighton Memorial Prize from the British School at Athens (1911)
- Mary Ewart Travelling Scholarship from Newnham College (1913–1914)

== Selected bibliography ==
- Catalogue of the Acropolis Museum Volume 1 Archaic Sculpture. London, Cambridge University Press 1912, (with Guy Dickens and Stanley Casson).
- Notes on Seljouk buildings at Konia, BSA 21 (1914–16) 31–54, pls. vi–xi.
- Terracottas", in Catalogue of the Acropolis Museum II, (Cambridge: CUP, 1921).
- Review of J. Harrison's, Mythology: Our Debt to Greece and Rome (London: George Harrap, 1925), in Classical Review 40 (1926) 19–20.
- Private Letters, Pagan and Christian: An Anthology of Greek and Roman Private Letters from the Fifth Century Before Christ to the Fifth Century of Our Era. W. P. Dutton, New York 1930
- Pilgrims Were They All: Studies of Religious Adventure in the Fourth Century of Our Era. London: Faber and Faber, 1937
- The Londoner. ("Britain in Pictures") London: William Collins, 1944
