= Ernest Bradfield =

English cricketer and British Army officer

Lieutenant-General Sir Ernest Bradfield KCIE OBE CStJ FRCS
- Bradfield in 1944
- Born: Ernest William Charles Bradfield; 28 May 1880; Birmingham, Warwickshire, England
- Died: 28 October 1963 (aged 83); Putney, London, England
- Spouse: Margaret Bradfield (m. 1920)
- Military career
- Allegiance: United Kingdom
- Branch: British Indian Army
- Service years: 1902–1939
- Rank: Lieutenant-General
- Unit: Indian Medical Service
- Conflicts: First World War; Mesopotamian campaign; Upper Mohmand Campaign; Second World War
- Awards: Knight Commander of the Order of the Indian Empire; Officer of the Order of the British Empire; Mentioned in Despatches (2)
- Cricket career

Cricket information

Domestic team information
- Years: Team
- 1906/07–1922/23: Europeans

Career statistics
Competition	First-class
Matches	4
Runs scored	49
Batting average	8.16
100s/50s	0/0
Top score	35
Catches/stumpings	1/–
- Source: CricInfo, 4 August 2025

Lieutenant-General Sir Ernest William Charles Bradfield, KCIE, OBE, CStJ, FRCS (28 May 1880 — 28 October 1963) was an Indian Medical Service officer and an English first-class cricketer. Graduating from St Mary's Hospital Medical School, he joined the Indian Medical Service in 1903 and would serve in campaigns in the North-West Frontier Province of British India and in the Mesopotamian campaign of the First World War. He would go on to hold a number of senior appointments within the Indian Medical Service, rising to the rank of lieutenant-general. Bradfield was noted as being influential in the establishment of the Indian Army Medical Corps during the Second World War. In addition to his lengthy and decorated military career, Bradfield also played first-class cricket on four occasions for the Europeans cricket team in India.

== Life and military career ==
The son of W. G. Bradfield, he was born at Birmingham in May 1880. He was educated at King Edward's School, Birmingham, before matriculating to the St Mary's Hospital Medical School, where he obtained an open scholarship in science. He was a keen sportsman during his studies, representing St Mary's at both cricket and rugby union. After graduating, he was commissioned into the Indian Medical Service as a lieutenant in August 1902, with promotion to captain following in July 1906. Specialising in surgery, he first saw action in the North-West Frontier Province in 1908. Bradfield made his debut in first-class cricket for the Europeans cricket team against the Parsees at Poona in the Bombay Presidency Match of September 1906. Bradfield served in the First World War in the Mesopotamian campaign, during which he was mentioned in despatches. He gained promotion during the war to major in February 1915, and was appointed an Officer of the Order of the British Empire in the 1918 Birthday Honours. He married Margaret Anne Olton in 1920, with the couple having two daughters.

Shortly after the war, Bradfield made a second appearance in first-class cricket for the Europeans against the Indians in the 1919–20 Madras Presidency Match, with him making two further appearances against the Indians in the Madras Presidency Matches of 1922 and 1923. In four first-class matches, he scored 49 runs at an average of 8.16, with a highest score of 35. He was promoted to lieutenant colonel in February 1923. In 1924, he was appointed Professor of Surgery at the Madras Medical College and was superintendent of the Government General Hospital in Madras, where he was credited with bringing it up to modern standards. When the Marylebone Cricket Club (MCC) toured India in 1927, Bradfield stood as an umpire in a first-class match between the MCC and Madras. In the 1928 Birthday Honours, he was appointed a Companion of the Order of the Indian Empire (CIE). Bradfield was promoted to colonel in September 1932, antedated to September 1927, and was appointed to the post of assistant director of medical services in India in the same month. The following year, he was mentioned in despatches once again during the Upper Mohmand Campaign of 1933.

Bradfield was promoted to major-general in August 1935, and in the same year he was appointed honorary surgeon to George V in 1935. He served his successors Edward VIII and George VI. He served as Surgeon-General for Bombay from 1935 to 1937, before serving as medical director of the Indian Medical Service from 1937 to 1939. In the 1938 New Year Honours, he was appointed a Commander of the Order of Saint John. Bradfield argued on the importance of the setting up of medical schools and colleges by the Government of India in the Indian Medical Review of 1938. In 1938 and 1939, he was chairman of the Indian Red Cross Society. In India, he took up polo and had the rare distinction of a doctor playing polo for the 13th Lancers while he was attached to them. He retired from the Indian Medical Service in November 1939, returning to England, where he became president of the Medical Branch of the India Office and medical adviser to the Secretary of State for India, Leo Amery.

Bradfield returned to India during the early stages of the Second World War as part of the Souttar Commission to investigate reports of a lack of medical officers for service in the British Indian Army, owing to the non-co-operation of the Indian National Congress. He was influential in the creation of the Indian Army Medical Corps, and was promoted to Knight Commander of the Order of the Indian Empire (KCIE) in the 1941 New Year Honours for his services. Bradfield was promoted to the local rank of lieutenant-general in October 1944, later being granted the honorary rank in July 1946. During the war, he served as the Indian Red Cross Commissioner for England from 1940 to 1946. Bradfield was later elected a fellow of the Royal College of Surgeons in 1962, a year before his death at Putney Hospital in October 1963.
