= Norman Greenfield =

Charles Norman Greenfield (4 April 1907 – 17 September 1997) was an English fireman with the Manchester City Fire Brigade who precipitated a significant legal case in British trade union history, particularly regarding the Fire Brigades Union (FBU).

Until 1938, the Manchester Fire Brigade had been part of the Manchester City Police and its members attested as police constables, a common practice in the early 20th century. In 1938 it became an independent organisation, but firemen who had joined before that time continued to be police constables and answerable to the Chief Constable in disciplinary matters. The Chief Constable also continued officially to be the Director of the Fire Brigade.

The Barnsley-born Greenfield was an experienced First Class Fireman who had been a member of the brigade for some years and was therefore an attested police constable. As such, he was not permitted to join the FBU or any other trade union. However, he took an interest in the welfare of his fellow firemen and particularly of the wartime members of the Auxiliary Fire Service, whose conditions were often extremely poor. He was one of the four members of the board of representatives, the body which had replaced the Police Federation in the fire brigade after 1938. He urged the AFS members to join the FBU, which, not being police officers, they were entitled to do. On 5 November 1940, Greenfield wrote to John Horner, General Secretary of the FBU, informing him of these conditions and enclosing 28 membership application forms from members of the AFS. However, Horner had recently moved and the letter was returned to sender on 9 November. Greenfield had listed his return address as "Fire Station, Manchester 10", his own station, but the letter was returned simply to "The Fire Station, Manchester" and delivered to headquarters.

On 19 November 1940, Greenfield was summoned before John Maxwell, the Chief Constable of Manchester, and charged with three disciplinary offences: acting in a manner likely to bring discredit upon the force; unauthorised communication with a person not connected with the fire brigade; and divulging to that person fire brigade matters. Maxwell listened to his explanation of his conduct, and then dismissed him on the spot. Greenfield appealed, as was his right, to the Watch Committee, the police force's governing body. However, after making his appeal he was asked to leave the room while they deliberated; Maxwell was allowed to stay while the committee deliberated an appeal against his own decision. Unsurprisingly, the appeal was dismissed.

The FBU demanded the return of the letter and membership forms, but Maxwell refused. In response, the FBU took him to court, demanding the return of their property and damages for its wrongful detention. The case, described as "unique in legal history", was heard in Manchester County Court on 26 February 1941 before Judge Thomas Bowes Leigh. Donald McIntyre appeared for the union and D. P. Dingle, Deputy Town Clerk of Manchester, for the Chief Constable. Dingle made much of the fact that Greenfield had headed his letter "Dear Comrade", implying that this showed communist sympathies.

The judge found in favour of the FBU. He ordered that the letter and forms be returned immediately and that the Chief Constable pay £5 damages for their detention. He also awarded costs against the Chief Constable on the highest possible scale.

Greenfield was invited to speak at the annual conference of the FBU in London later that year and was greeted with massive applause. After being dismissed he had obtained a position (and a promotion) as Fourth Officer with Barnsley Borough Fire Brigade. As this was a civilian brigade, he was entitled to join the FBU, and was later elected to the Executive Council.

The Greenfield case strengthened the rights to join a trade union and was one of the final nails in the coffin of the system of police-controlled fire brigades.
