= Walter Nicholson =

British civil servant (1877–1946)

Portrait by Walter Stoneman, 1922

Sir Walter Frederic Nicholson, KCB (22 July 1877 – 28 February 1946) was an English civil servant. Educated at Balliol College, Oxford, he joined the Civil Service in 1899, initially working as a clerk in the Admiralty. From 1920 to 1930, he was the Permanent Secretary of the Air Ministry. He was then the government member of the board of British Airways until 1937. He was appointed a Companion of the Order of the Bath in the 1916 New Year Honours, and was promoted to Knight Commander in the 1922 Birthday Honours.

In 1939 he married the archaeologicist Dorothy Lamb.

Government offices
Preceded by Sir Arthur Robinson	Permanent Secretary of the Air Ministry; 1920–1930	Succeeded by Sir Christopher Bullock
