= Gerald Gardiner, Baron Gardiner =

British peer (1900–1990)

The Right Honourable The Lord Gardiner CH PC QC
- Lord Gardiner in 1977

Lord Chancellor
- In office 16 October 1964 – 19 June 1970
- Monarch: Elizabeth II
- Prime Minister: Harold Wilson
- Preceded by: The Lord Dilhorne
- Succeeded by: The Lord Hailsham of St Marylebone

Member of the House of Lords Lord Temporal
- In office 15 January 1964 – 7 January 1990; Life Peerage

Personal details
- Born: Gerald Austin Gardiner; 30 May 1900 London, England
- Died: 7 January 1990 (aged 89) London, England
- Party: Labour
- Spouses: Lesley Trounson (m. 1925; died 1966); Muriel Box (m. 1970)
- Children: 1
- Education: Magdalen College, Oxford; Open University

Gerald Austin Gardiner, Baron Gardiner, CH, PC, QC (30 May 1900 – 7 January 1990) was a British Labour politician, who served as Lord High Chancellor of Great Britain from 1964 to 1970. In that position he embarked on a programme of reform, most importantly setting up the Law Commission in 1965.

== Early life and education ==
Gardiner was born in Chelsea, London. His father was Robert Septimus Gardiner (died 16 November 1939) and his mother was Alice von Ziegesar (died 31 January 1953), daughter of Count von Ziegesar and granddaughter of Dionysius Lardner. He attended Harrow School.

While Gardiner was at Magdalen College, Oxford in the 1920s, he became president of the Oxford Union and of the Oxford University Dramatic Society. He was rusticated (suspended) in 1921, and was again threatened with rustication in November 1922, for publishing a pamphlet attacking restrictions on women undergraduates. A woman undergraduate had suffered the same fate a few days previously for climbing into a men's college after a dance. Gardiner rushed to her defence and the Vice-Chancellor, Lewis Richard Farnell, notoriously out of touch with the post-war generation, asked Gardiner to leave at 06:00; any later, Farnell knew, would have meant a sympathetic funeral procession several hundred strong. The girl to whose defence Gardiner had come was Dilys Powell, who later became a film critic. Gardiner graduated with a fourth-class degree in jurisprudence in 1923.

While occupying the position of Chancellor of the Open University, he took a degree in the Social Sciences, at the age of 76.

== Pacifism ==
Gerald Gardiner served in the Coldstream Guards in 1918 and was commissioned in 1919, but in the 1930s he joined the Peace Pledge Union. During World War II Gardiner volunteered to join the Friends' Ambulance Unit, as an alternative to military service, although he was actually just over conscription age, and served 1943 to 1945; as someone relatively mature, he was usefully able to lead a 55-strong team assisting refugees in the turmoil of North-West Europe in the last year of the war.

== Legal career ==
Gardiner was called to the Bar in 1925 and was made King's Counsel in 1948. As a lawyer, he fought for the abolition of capital punishment. He represented The Daily Mirror and its columnist 'Cassandra' (William Connor) in a notable libel trial in 1959 when the pianist Liberace claimed that a newspaper article imputed that he was homosexual. More successfully, he was the Counsel for the Defence in R v Penguin Books Ltd, the trial for obscenity of the publishers of Lady Chatterley's Lover in 1960. He played an active role in various reform movements and held numerous professional positions. He was a member of the Committee on Supreme Court Practice and Procedure, 1947–53 chaired by Raymond Evershed, 1st Baron Evershed. He was a member of the Lord Chancellor's Law Reform Committee, 1952–63. He was a Master of the Bench of the Inner Temple in 1955, Chairman of the General Council of the Bar in 1958 and 1959. He was a member of the International Commission of Jurists in 1971. He was Joint Chairman of the National Campaign for Abolition of Capital Punishment.

== Lord Chancellorship ==
Gardiner stood for election as the Labour Party's candidate in the 1951 General Election in Croydon West. He lost to the Conservative, Richard Thompson. In the 1964 New Year Honours he was made a life peer as Baron Gardiner, of Kittisford in the County of Somerset. On the Labour Party's General Election victory in 1964, he was appointed Lord Chancellor and to the Privy Council of the United Kingdom in 1964 by Harold Wilson. In 1970, the Labour Party was defeated in the General Election and Lord Gardiner resigned as Lord Chancellor. In that role, he was responsible for the creation of the Ombudsman. He also did much to advance women's rights.

=== Security surveillance ===
During debates on the British Telecommunications Bill in the House of Lords in 1981, various members raised concerns about telephone tapping, a matter of disquiet in the community and amongst these members. In his contribution, Lord Gardiner told of the difficulties he experienced as Lord Chancellor (1964–1970) in being able to conduct strictly private discussions with the then Attorney-General. Lord Gardiner said he believed his telephone calls were intercepted by a British intelligence organisation. He also alluded to a need to take a ride around the park in his chauffeur-driven car with the Attorney-General to ensure security of their conversations – rather than having 'security' listen in

== Post-Lord Chancellorship ==
=== Northern Ireland Interrogation methods Minority Report ===
Lord Gardiner published the Minority Report in March 1972 as part of the Parker Report (Report of the Committee of Privy Counsellors appointed to consider authorised procedures for the interrogation of persons suspected of terrorism), which considered the interrogation procedures used against suspects of terrorism in Northern Ireland, with particular reference to allegations of torture during internment in 1971 (See Sensory deprivation, Use of torture since 1948#United Kingdom, Five techniques). Lord Gardiner was appointed a Member of the Order of the Companions of Honour in the 1975 New Year's Honours.

=== Assassination attempt ===
In June 1981 Gardiner survived an assassination attempt when a bomb containing 3 pounds of explosive was attached to his car by the IRA during a visit to Belfast. The device was later found near the junction of University Road and Elmwood Avenue, Belfast, and defused by the British Army. The IRA released a statement saying: "We meant to kill Gardiner, the political architect of the criminalization policy and the H-blocks. The device fell off the car and failed to explode."

=== Open University ===
He was Chancellor of the Open University from 1973 to 1978.

== Personal life ==
In 1925, Gardiner married Lesly Trounson; they had one daughter, and were married until his wife's death in 1966. In 1970, Gardiner married Muriel Box, a writer, producer and director who had won an Academy Award for Best Original Screenplay for The Seventh Veil. She published his biography in 1983.

Gardiner died at his home in Mill Hill, London, on 7 January 1990, at the age of 89.

== Arms ==
Coat of arms of Gerald Gardiner, Baron Gardiner
Crest A Stag proper gorged with a collar Argent charged with three lozenges conjoined Gules and supporting with the dexter leg an escutcheon also Argent charged with four lozenges conjoined in fess Gules between two barrulets Sable and in chief a Rose also Gules. Escutcheon Gules a plain fess with cottises engrailed Argent between four roses three in chief and one in base of the last. Supporters Dexter a pegasus Argent sinister a dragon Gules. Motto In Deo Confidecti Age (Trust in God, Act Rightly)

== Legacy ==
Gardiner's archives are held by two institutions, the Churchill Archive Centre in Cambridge and the British Library. The latter collection chiefly concerns the abolition of capital punishment in Great Britain.

== Publications ==
- Capital Punishment as a Deterrent: and the alternative, London, Victor Gollancz (1956).
- Law Reform Now (Edited with Andrew Martin), London, Victor Gollancz (1963).
- Justice (INTERNATIONAL COMMISSION OF JURISTS) Living it down. The problem of old convictions. The report of a Committee set up by Justice, The Howard League for Penal Reform, The National Association for the Care and Resettlement of Offenders. Chairman of Committee, the Rt. Hon. Lord Gardiner. London: Stevens & Sons, 1972. ISBN 0-420-43910-2
- UK Government, Northern Ireland Office. Report of a Committee to consider, in the context of civil liberties and human rights, measures to deal with terrorism in Northern Ireland, etc. (1975) (Parliamentary papers. Cmnd. 5847) ISBN 0-10-158470-9, Chair: Lord Gardiner.

Political offices
Preceded by The Lord Dilhorne	Lord High Chancellor of Great Britain; 1964–1970	Succeeded by The Lord Hailsham of St Marylebone
Academic offices
Preceded by The Lord Crowther	Chancellor of the Open University; 1973–1978	Succeeded by The Lord Briggs
