= Clinton Francis Samuel Danby =

Royal Navy admiral

Sir Clinton Francis Samuel Danby, KBE (1882 – 30 June 1945), aka Peter, retired as Admiral Superintendent, HM Dockyard, Chatham [HMS Pembroke] in 1942.

== Biography ==
He was born in 1882 in Witham, Lincolnshire the son of Rev. Clement Edward Danby, MA, and Susanna Ellis Baddeley. He married in 1914 Phyllis Antill-Pockley, of Sydney, NSW. They had two sons and a daughter. One son, Clinton Brian Danby, became a captain in the Royal Artillery.

== Service history ==
He retired from the navy with the rank of Vice Admiral on 5 November 1937, but was recalled and served as Admiral Superintendent of Chatham Dockyard until he was allowed to retire again 15 October 1942. In 1942 he married Alice Beatrice Johnson, widow of Capt. F.M. Johnson, RN, and died in Kent 30 June 1945.

He was awarded a KBE in the 1941 New Year Honours List.

There is a portrait of him in the National Portrait Gallery.
