= George Chrystal (civil servant) =

British civil servant (1880–1944)

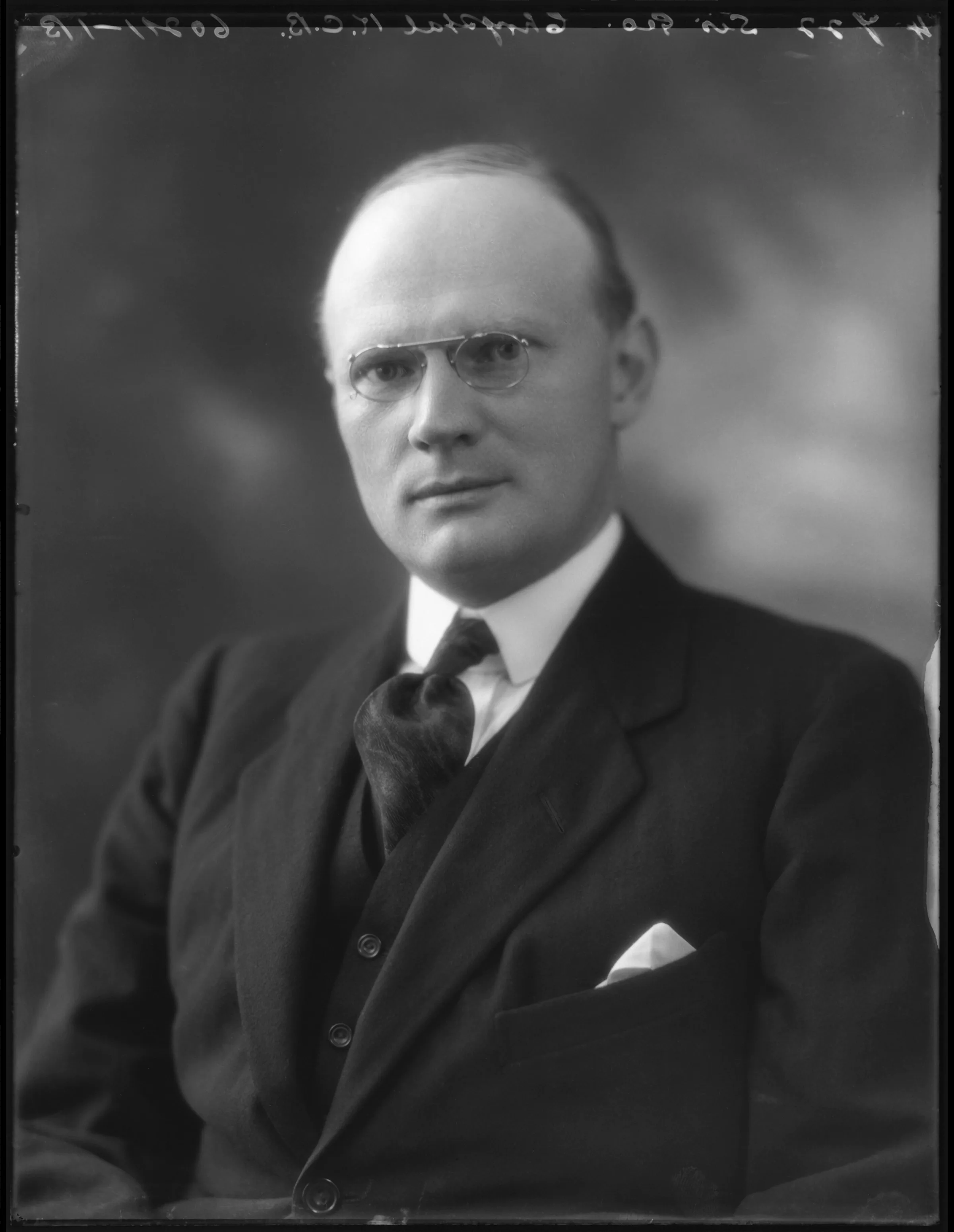
Chrystal in 1922

Sir George William Chrystal KCB (28 August 1880 – 1 November 1944) was a British civil servant.

Chrystal was the son of the mathematician George Chrystal and was born in Edinburgh. He was educated at George Watson's College, the University of Edinburgh, and Balliol College, Oxford, at which he took a second in Classical Moderations in 1902 and a second in Greats in 1904. He joined the Civil Service at the Admiralty in that year, but two years later transferred to the Home Office, serving successively as assistant private secretary to Home Secretary Reginald McKenna, secretary to the Parliamentary Under-Secretary of State, and principal secretary to Permanent Secretary Sir Edward Troup. He also served as joint secretary to the Royal Commission on Mines and the Royal Commission on Metalliferous Mines and Quarries.

In 1917 he was appointed Assistant Secretary to the Ministry of National Service. After the end of the First World War in 1918 he became Secretary to the Ministry of Reconstruction and of the Demobilisation Section of the War Cabinet. In 1919 he was appointed Secretary to the Ministry of Pensions, holding the post until 1935 when he was appointed Permanent Secretary of the Ministry of Health, retiring in 1940.

Chrystal was also a writer, publishing a new translation of the Meditations of Marcus Aurelius, the translation of the Memoirs of Prince Chlodwig of Hohenlohe-Schillingsfürst, a translation of Julius Meier Graef's Development of Modern Art, the Life of William Robertson Smith, and a volume of Smith's lectures and essays.

Chrystal was appointed Companion of the Order of the Bath (CB) in the 1920 New Year Honours and Knight Commander of the Order of the Bath (KCB) in the 1922 Birthday Honours.
