= Robert Septimus Gardiner =

British businessman (1856 - 1939)

- Born: 26 March 1856
- Died: 16 November 1939 (aged 83)
- Education: Grenoble University
- Occupation: businessman

Sir Robert Septimus Gardiner (26 March 1856 – 16 November 1939) was a British businessman.

The seventh son of the Rev. George Gregory Gardiner and Frances Mary Touchet, he was born in Bonn, Prussia, where his father was a British chaplain. He attended Grenoble University and was fluent in French, German, and English. A successful businessman who served on the boards of many companies; his chief interests were in mining and securities. He also was interested in the arts: he was the composer of the Lyric Polka, he became director and chairman of the board of the Alhambra Theatre.

He was knighted in the 1922 Birthday Honours. He was devoted to charitable work; according to The Times, "Every appeal brought to his notice was given his sympathetic consideration and support." he was vice president of the Kent and Canterbury Hospital, a trustee of the Chelsea Hospital for Women, and honorary treasurer of the Governesses' Benevolent Institution.

In 1896, he married Alice von Ziegesar, daughter of Baron von Ziegesar; she wrote a book of poems, A Garland of Roses as well as a novel which remained unpublished. He was the father of three children, Cyril, Gerald (later Lord Chancellor), and Nevile, born in 1897, 1900 and 1902, respectively.

He died aged 83 at Addington Palace Country Club, Surrey. His funeral was held on 20 November at St James's Church, Sussex Gardens, Paddington; Sidney Nowell Rostron officiated.
