= Walter Lamb (classicist) =

British classical lecturer, author and translator (1882–1961)

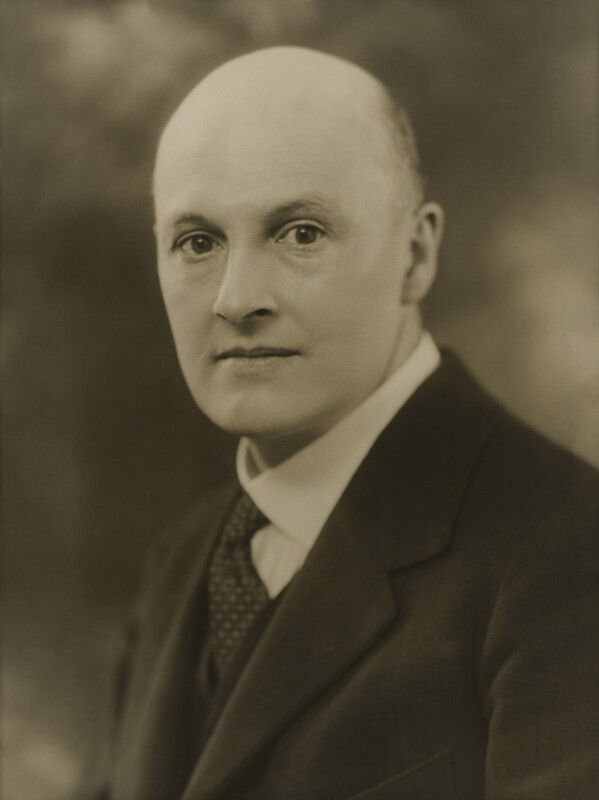
Lamb in 1931

Sir Walter Rangeley Maitland Lamb KCVO (5 January 1882 – 27 March 1961) was a British classical lecturer, author and translator. He was Secretary of the Royal Academy from 1913 to 1951.

Born in Adelaide, Australia, to the British mathematician Horace Lamb and Elizabeth Foot, his siblings included the painter Henry Lamb and the archaeologist Dorothy Lamb. His nephew was the climatologist Hubert Lamb and his great-nephew was the Liberal Democrat politician Norman Lamb.

In 1911, Lamb proposed to the writer Virginia Woolf but was turned down.

He was appointed a Commander of the Royal Victorian Order (CVO), and on 1 January 1943, a Knight Commander of the Order (KCVO).

== Publications ==
- The Royal Academy : a short history of its foundation and development by Sir Walter R.M. Lamb (1951)
