= John Maxwell (police officer) =

British police officer (1882–1968)

Sir John Maxwell CBE KPM

Chief Constable of Manchester City Police
- In office 1927 – November 1942

Personal details
- Born: 24 December 1882 Muirkirk, Ayrshire, Scotland
- Died: 14 February 1968 (aged 85)
- Occupation: Police officer
- Known for: Involvement in the Greenfield case

Sir John Maxwell CBE KPM (24 December 1882 – 14 February 1968) was a British police officer.

Maxwell grew up in Muirkirk, Ayrshire. He joined the Manchester City Police in 1901 and served as Chief Constable from 1927 to November 1942. He was awarded the King's Police Medal (KPM) in the 1929 New Year Honours, appointed Commander of the Order of the British Empire (CBE) in the 1936 New Year Honours, and knighted in the 1941 New Year Honours.

Maxwell's involvement in the 1940/1941 Greenfield case over his dismissal of a fireman resulted in considerable negative publicity.

== See also ==
- Charles Norman Greenfield
