= Timothy Whites =

British Retail Store Chain

- Industry: pharmaceutical
- Founded: 1848
- Founder: Timothy White
- Defunct: 1985
- Headquarters: Portsmouth, England

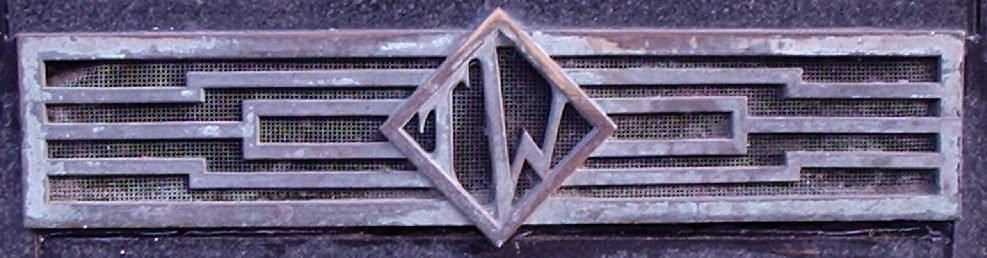
The Timothy Whites logo on this ventilator grille is still in place in 2009

Timothy Whites was a British chain of dispensing chemist and houseware stores.

== History ==
The origin of Timothy Whites was a ships' chandlers and general store in Portsmouth, started in 1848 by Timothy White. White himself qualified as a pharmacist in 1869. By 1890, Whites was one of four British pharmacists with over ten branches. Whites sold hardware as well as that which was normally found at a retail chemist's. In 1904 he had his company incorporated as Timothy Whites Ltd.

Timothy Whites merged with Taylors Drug Co. Ltd. in 1935 to form Timothy Whites & Taylors; the shops themselves were named either simply "Timothy Whites" or "Timothy Whites & Taylors". In 1944 Timothy Whites purchased rival ironmonger firm Mence Smith, the branches of which were in the early 1960s either converted to Timothy Whites or sold off, including 102 stores to Moores Stores in 1962. Timothy Whites was taken over by Boots Pure Drug Co. in 1968. Immediately before the takeover there were 614 Timothy Whites shops, which had had a combined turnover of approximately £33m in the year before the acquisition. As a result of the rationalization that followed the takeover, Boots rebranded and absorbed the pharmaceutical side of the business, leaving Timothy Whites with just 196 shops that sold only housewares, not a successful move. The Timothy Whites name eventually disappeared in 1985.
