= Traugott Bernhard Zwar =

Traugott Bernhard Zwar (20 June 1876 – 16 January 1947) was an Australian academic, army medical officer and surgeon. He was born in Stockwell, South Australia, Australia and died in Malvern, Melbourne, Victoria, Australia. He was a founder of the Royal Australasian College of Surgeons.

== See also ==
- Albert Michael Zwar
- Sir John Greig Latham
- Walter Russell Hall
- Charles Arthur Wheeler
