= Emmanuel Hoyle =

Lieutenant-Colonel Sir Emmanuel Hoyle, 1st Baronet OBE, JP (23 September 1866 – 9 May 1939), was a British woollen cloth manufacturer.

Hoyle was born at Longwood, near Huddersfield, the son of Joseph Hoyle, who had established Joseph Hoyle and Sons, woollen cloth manufacturers, in 1865. He was appointed an Officer of the Order of the British Empire (OBE) in recognition of his wartime services in home defence transport. In 1922 he was created a baronet, of Longwood in the West Riding of the County of York.

Hoyle purchased the Banney Royd mansion, on a seven-acre estate in Edgerton, Huddersfield, in 1918; it had been built in 1902, for local accountant W H Armitage, to the designs of architect Edgar Wood. Hoyle died in May 1939, aged 72, when the baronetcy became extinct. At the time of his death Joseph Hoyle and Sons employed 2,000 people.

Baronetage of the United Kingdom
New creation	Baronet (of Longwood); 1922–1939	Extinct
