= Charles Ogilvie (civil servant) =

British administrator in India and historian

Sir Charles MacIvor Grant Ogilvie, CSI, CBE (6 May 1891 – 17 February 1967), also known as C. M. G. Ogilvie, was a British administrator in India and historian. Described as "one of the most scholarly members of the Indian Civil Service of his day", he served in the Punjab, then held the post of Secretary of the Defence Department of the Government of India from 1937 to 1945, throughout the Second World War. After the war, he retired from government service and became Lecturer in History at the University of St Andrews in 1945, retiring in 1956.

== Biography ==
The son of Alexander Grant Ogilvie and of Charlotte Ogilvie, Charles Ogilvie was educated at Bedford School and Exeter College, Oxford. He joined the Indian Civil Service by examination in 1914 and arrived in India in December 1915. He was posted to the Punjab and held various district appointments, including Deputy Commissioner of Gurdaspur in 1919. On two occasions in 1923, he officiated as Administrator of Nabha State during the minority of Nawab Mohammad Iftikhar Ali Khan Siddiqui Pataudi. From 1925 to 1928, he was Deputy Commissioner of the Lahore District. At Lahore, he came into contact with the Governor of the Punjab, Sir Malcolm Hailey, who encouraged his interest in historical research. He was appointed Senior Secretary to the Financial Commissioners in 1928 and Home Secretary to the Government of Punjab the following year.

Whilst on long leave in England, Ogilvie became a fellow commoner of Corpus Christi College, Cambridge in 1931, was elected an exhibitioner in 1932, and took first-class honours in the historical tripos of 1933. On his return, he resumed his post as Home Secretary, but became Financial Secretary in September 1933. His tenure was interrupted in 1934 when he was sent to Delhi as Joint Secretary in the Army Department to work on the reorganization of the Military Medical Services, after which he resumed his post in the Punjab.

In 1936, he attended the Imperial Defence College in England, and in 1937 he was appointed Defence Secretary of the Government of India. He held this post throughout the Second World War until 1945, when he returned to England on long leave, though he did not retire from ICS until 1947.

In 1945, he was appointed Lecturer in Modern History at the University of St Andrews in 1945, and retired in 1956. Among his students was Elizabeth Alexandria Menzies, one of the first women to obtain a PhD in History at St Andrews. In 1958, he published The King’s Government and the Common Law, 1471–1641.

Ogilvie was appointed a CBE in 1928, CSI in 1941, and knighted in 1944.

He married Gwladys Evelyn Mary Thomson (died 1956), daughter of G. F. Thomson of Bedford, in 1916; they had one son and three daughters.
