= Arthur Robinson (civil servant) =

Sir William Arthur Robinson (9 September 1874 – 23 April 1950) was a British civil servant.

Educated at The Queen's College, Oxford, he entered in the Civil Service in 1897, initially working in the Colonial Office and from 1912 at the Office of Works. From 1918 to 1920, he was the Permanent Secretary of the new Air Ministry. He was then Permanent Secretary of the Ministry of Health from 1920 to 1935, during which time he oversaw the implementation of major housing, pensions, planning and local government reforms. He was then chairman of the Supply Board before becoming Permanent Secretary of the new Ministry of Supply in 1939. He retired in 1940.

Government offices
Preceded by office established	Permanent Secretary of the Air Ministry; 1917–1920	Succeeded by Sir Walter Nicholson
