= David Serjeant =

English-Australian cricketer and author

Sir David Serjeant
Personal information
- Born: 18 January 1830; Ramsey, Cambridgeshire, England
- Died: 12 January 1929 (aged 98); London, England

Domestic team information
- Years: Team
- 1856-1857: Victoria
- Source: Cricinfo, 13 February 2015

Sir David Maurice Serjeant (18 January 1830 – 12 January 1929) was an English-born cricketer who played two first-class cricket matches in Australia for Victoria. Described as a "very good batsman" with a defence that was "neat to a fault", he opened the batting for Victoria in both intercolonial matches, including in the very first against New South Wales, held in March 1856 on the newly-opened Melbourne Cricket Ground. The first ball of the match, bowled by George Gilbert, was driven by Serjeant for two.

He played for Peterborough in England, and in an 1850 match against the touring All England Eleven, he top-scored in the second innings before being bowled by John Wisden of Wisden Cricketers' Almanack fame. Educated at Cambridge University, Serjeant moved to Australia in 1852 and had a varied career. At club level, he made appearances for Richmond, and served as secretary of the Sandhurst Cricket Club. He returned to England in 1859 to continue his studies. He worked as a physician and surgeon, and was knighted in 1922.

Serjeant's brother and nephews were also cricketers.

He was the author of Australia: Its Cricket Bat and Kangaroo.

Serjeant was the last-surviving member of the cricketers who played in the first intercolonial match between Victoria and New South Wales. He died in London in 1929.

== See also ==
- List of Victoria first-class cricketers
