= Dawson Sheppard =

Royal Navy Admiral (1866–1953)

Admiral Sir Thomas Dawson Lees Sheppard, KBE, CB, MVO (7 April 1866 – 24 February 1953) was a Royal Navy officer.
