= John Drughorn =

British businessman (1862–1943)

Sir John Frederick Drughorn
- Born: 1862
- Died: 1943 (aged 80–81)
- Occupation: shipowner

Sir John Frederick Drughorn, 1st Baronet of Ifield Hall (1 August 1862 – 23 February 1943) was a Dutch-born English shipowner and a major benefactor of the town of Crawley, UK, including the Ifield Golf club course and another course in Gorleston-on-Sea.

Born Jean Frederic Drughorn in Amsterdam, the oldest son of the shipping magnate Johannes Jacobus Drughorn and Frederica Christina Kessler, both of Amsterdam.

At the age of 20, already in charge of his father's business, he married Roosje Moses in 1863. The couple had three children in Amsterdam. Then he married Elizabeth Berlips, daughter of Lewis Berlips, in 1883.

As director of his father's shipping company, (Fred Drughorn, Ltd,) he was convicted in 1914 of trading with the enemy by allowing his ships to be used to supply Germany. Despite that history, he successfully purchased a baronetcy (of Ifield Hall in the County of Sussex) in 1922 from Maundy Gregory as part of the Lloyd George honours scandal.

Now Sir John, he remarried in England and had at least 2 mistresses.

Drughorn's son William served in WWI and was killed at the Somme. William enlisted under an alias due to the family name being tarnished by his father's conviction.

Drughorn died in bed at Ifield Hall on 15 February 1943, aged eighty.

Baronetage of the United Kingdom
New creation	Baronet (of Ifield Hall); 1922–1943	Extinct
