= Arthur R. H. Morrell =

Captain Sir Arthur Routley Hutson Morrell KBE (1878–1968) was a British mariner and member of the Corporation of Trinity House, a non-departmental public body of the United Kingdom responsible for maritime safety.

== Biography ==
Born in October 1878, Arthur Morrell was educated at Bedford School. He was one of the Elder Brethren, and served from 1935 to 1948 as Deputy Master of Trinity House. As part of his functions, he often served as a nautical assessor in the British courts, including in the Judicial Committee of the Privy Council and in Admiralty cases in the High Court of Justice. He also was part of the British delegation which negotiated the International Convention for the Safety of Life at Sea in 1929.

Sir Arthur Morrell died on 2 February 1968.
