= Edith MacQueen =

British historian

Edith Edgar MacQueen (1900–1977) was a Scottish parliamentary historian and a historian of Scottish emigration to North America. She was the first woman to receive a Ph.D. in history from the University of St Andrews.

== Early life ==
MacQueen was the daughter of George MacQueen of Mongus, Angus, Scotland.

== Academic career ==
MacQueen matriculated at St Andrews in 1918, graduating with first class honours in English and history in 1922. In 1922 MacQueen was awarded the Berry Scholarship in History, submitting a monograph on the Life of the Duke of Albany for which she was awarded the Hume Brown Essay Prize in Scottish History in June 1923.

In October 1923 MacQueen started studying for her Ph.D. She was the first woman to do so at St Andrews and the fourth Ph.D. student in history following the university's decision to grant them in 1920. She was awarded a Carnegie Scholarship in 1923 to assist her with her research; it was renewed in 1924/25. In 1926 she submitted her thesis entitled ‘The General Assembly of the Kirk as the rival of the Scottish parliament, 1560-1618’, which was supervised by J. D. Mackie.

MacQueen continued her work on parliamentary history as well as working on Scottish emigration to North America in her later life. She also wrote historical programs for BBC Radio's school programs in the late 1930s. From 1927 to 1929 she studied at Yale University as a Commonwealth Fund Fellow.

== Personal life ==
In 1944 MacQueen married Leslie Haden-Guest, the Labour MP for Islington North. In 1950 he was raised to the peerage as Baron Haden-Guest, of Saling in the County of Essex. She was then styled as Baroness Haden-Guest.

She died in 1977. Her papers are held by the University of St Andrews.
