= Gerald Robert Poole =

Lieutenant-General Gerald Robert Poole CB CMG DSO
- Born: 17 January 1868; Clifton, Bristol, England
- Died: 20 October 1937 (aged 69); Vancouver, British Columbia, Canada
- Military career
- Allegiance: United Kingdom
- Branch: Royal Marines
- Rank: Lieutenant-General
- Unit: Royal Marine Artillery
- Commands: 26th Heavy Artillery Battery; Royal Marine Howitzer Brigade; No. 3 (Heavy) Battery
- Conflicts: First World War
- Awards: Companion of the Order of the Bath; Companion of the Order of St Michael and St George; Distinguished Service Order; Mentioned in Despatches (3)

Lieutenant-General Gerald Robert Poole, CB, CMG, DSO (17 January 1868 – 20 October 1937) was a heavy artillery commander during the First World War with the Royal Marine Artillery and the Royal Garrison Artillery. He was Colonel Commandant of the Royal Marine Artillery between 1921 and 1922, and during this period also served as Marine aide-de-camp to King George V.

== Early life ==
Gerald Poole was born on 17 January 1868 at Clifton. He was educated at Bedford Modern School where his father, Reverend Canon Robert Burton Poole became headmaster. From school he went to the Royal Military Academy, Woolwich and then proceeded to the Royal Marine Artillery as a probationary lieutenant.

== Early career ==
Poole served as a gunnery officer on-board a number of Royal Navy ships including; HMS Imperious (Mediterranean and Vancouver Island 1894–99), HMS Irresistible (Mediterranean 1902–04), HMS Victory (Scapa Flow, 1912) and HMS Inflexible (Mediterranean 1912–14). He was promoted to captain in 1896 and major in 1908. From 1906–12 he was seconded to the Canadian Government as a gunnery instructor and commanded No. 3 (Heavy) Battery of the Royal Canadian Artillery.

== First World War ==
In 1915 Poole was promoted to lieutenant colonel and appointed Commander of the Royal Marine Howitzer Brigade in France. From May 1916 he took command of the 26th Heavy Artillery Battery of the Royal Garrison Artillery although he maintained administrative command of the Royal Marine Brigade for the duration of the war. On occasions he would incorporate the Marine howitzers within the RGA battery, for example at the Battle of Vimy Ridge in April 1917. He was mentioned three times in the Despatches of the Commander in Chief of the British Expeditionary Force, was appointed Companion of the Order of St Michael and St George in 1917 and awarded the Distinguished Service Order in 1918.

== Later career ==
Poole was appointed Colonel Commandant of the Royal Marine Artillery at Eastney in 1921, and ADC to the King in the same year. He was promoted to major general in 1922 and also appointed a Companion of the Order of the Bath. He was made lieutenant general in 1924 and retired on 11 December 1925.

== Personal life ==
On retirement Poole settled on Vancouver with his Canadian wife Gertrude; they had one son and one daughter. Poole was a keen musician and had served as Superintendent of the Royal Navy School of Music. He was also a fine horseman and became a proficient backwoodsman during his time in Canada. Gerald Poole died on 20 October 1937 in Vancouver.
