= Arthur Lewis Dixon =

British civil servant

Sir Arthur Lewis Dixon, CB CBE (30 January 1881 – 14 September 1969) was a British civil servant. He spent his entire career at the Home Office, where he reformed and modernized both the police and fire services. In particular, he was responsible for the creation of the National Fire Service during the Second World War.
