= Price (surname) =

Price is a patronymic name derived from the Welsh "ap Rhys" meaning "son of Rhys". The given name Rhys means "enthusiasm" in Welsh. It is a common surname among those of Welsh ancestry. At the time of the British Census of 1881, its frequency was highest in Radnorshire (38.2 times the British average), followed by Brecknockshire, Herefordshire, Monmouthshire, Flintshire, Shropshire, Denbighshire, Glamorgan, Carmarthenshire and Worcestershire. The surname has many other spellings including Priess, Priesz, and many others.

The name is thought to have originally been spelled "Pryce" and pronounced "Preese". Name experts believe that the change of the "y" to "i" and the subsequent change in pronunciation was originally an affectation meant to make the name seem more English and therefore more prestigious.

== Notable people named Price ==
=== A ===
- Adam Price (born 1968), Welsh politician
- Adrian Price-Whelan, American astronomer
- Alan Price (born 1942), English musician, songwriter and actor
- Alan R. Price (born 1942), American health academic
- Alex Price, multiple people
- Alfred Price, multiple people
- Ali Price (born 1993), rugby player
- Allen Price (born 1968), Welsh footballer
- Andrew Price, multiple people
- Anthony Price, multiple people
- Antony Price (1945–2025), English fashion designer
- Aron Price (born 1982), Australian golfer
- Arthur Price, multiple people
- Austin Price (born 1995), American basketball player in the Israeli Premier Basketball League

=== B ===
- Barry Price (born 1949), Australian rules footballer
- Baxter Price (born 1938), NASCAR driver
- Benjamin Price, multiple people
- Bert Price (1907–1986), Canadian politician
- Berwyn Price (born 1951), former Welsh athlete
- Beryl Price (born 1912), British composer
- Betsy Price (born 1949), American politician
- Betty Price, multiple people
- Bill Price, multiple people
- Birgitte Price (1934–1997), Danish actress
- Blake Price (born 1974), Canadian sports broadcaster
- Bobby Price (born 1998), American football player
- Brendan Price, English actor
- Brent Price (born 1968), American basketball player
- Bret Price (born 1950), American sculptor
- Brian Price, multiple people
- Brianna Price (born 1986), Canadian musician
- Bruce Price (1845–1903), architect of many of the Canadian Pacific Railway's stations and hotels
- Bryan Price (born 1962), American baseball coach
- Byron Price (1891–1981), American government official, journalist
- Byron Price (Arkansas politician) (c. 1853–1908), American politician

=== C ===
- Carey Price (born 1987), Canadian ice hockey player
- Catherine Price, multiple people
- Cecil Price (1938–2001), deputy sheriff and conspirator in the murders of Chaney, Goodman, and Schwerner
- Cecil Price (priest) (1925–1997), Irish Anglican priest
- Cecil Price (footballer) (1919–2008)
- Cedric Price (1934–2003), English architect and teacher and writer on architecture
- Chad Price, vocalist
- Charles Price, multiple people
- Charlotte Price White (1873–1932), Welsh suffragist and politician
- Christopher Price, various people
- Ciara Price
- Cicero Price (1805–1888), United States Navy commodore
- Claire Price (born 1972), English actress
- Clayton Sumner Price, (1874–1950), American painter
- Cliff Price (1900–1959), English footballer
- Clinton G. Price (1864–1937), American politician and lawyer
- Colin Price (born 1943), English cricketer
- Collin Price (born 1999), American baseball player
- Connor Price (born 1994), Canadian rapper and actor
- Craig Price, multiple people

=== D ===
- Dale Price (1924–1997), Justice of the Arkansas Supreme Court
- Daniel Price (or Danny Price), multiple people
- David Price, multiple people
- Denham Price (1940–2013), South African cricketer
- Dennis Price (1915–1973), English actor
- Deon Nielsen Price (born 1934), American pianist, composer and educator
- Derek J. de Solla Price (1922–1983), science historian and information scientist
- Devon Price, American social psychologist and writer
- Dick Price, multiple people
  - Dick Price (1930–1985), co-founder of Esalen Institute
- Dilys Price (1932–2020), Welsh educator, parachutist, and model
- Dionne Price (1971–2024), African-American statistician
- Dolours Price (1951–2013), Irish Republican
- Dorothy Price (physician) (1890–1954), Irish physician
- Dorothy Price (1899–1980), American physiologist and endocrinologist
- Dorothy Cilla Price (born 1969), British art historian and academic
- D'Vonte Price (born 1999), American football player

=== E ===
- Ed Price, multiple people
- E. Hoffmann Price (1898–1988), American writer
- Ejuan Price (born 1993), American football player
- Eli Kirk Price (1797–1884), American politician
- Eli Kirk Price II (1860–1933), American lawyer from Philadelphia
- Elizabeth Price, multiple people
- Ellen Price (1878–1968), Danish actress and ballerina
- Elliott Price, Canadian sportscaster
- Eoin Price (born 1988), Irish hurler
- Eric Price (born 1974), American entertainer
- Eric Price (1918–2002), English first-class cricketer
- Ernest Price, multiple people
- Ethel Clay Price (1874–1943), American nurse and socialite
- Eugenia Price (1916–1996), American historical novelist
- Evadne Price (1888–1985), Australian-British writer, entertainer, and astrologer

=== F ===
- Fanny Price-Gwynne (1819–1901) Welsh novelist and artist
- Florence Price (1887–1953), African-American classical composer
- Four Price, or Walter Thomas Price IV (born 1967), American politician
- Frank Price (1930–2025), American television writer and executive
- Frank Price (politician) (1922–2017), United Kingdom politician
- Dr. Frederick K.C. Price (1932–2021), American pastor of Crenshaw Christian Center

=== G ===
- Gabriel Price (1879–1934), British politician
- Gabriella Price (born 2003), American tennis player
- Gary Price, multiple people
- George Price, multiple people
- Gerwyn Price (born 1985), Welsh professional darts player and former professional rugby union and rugby league footballer
- Glenn D. Price (born 1955), Canadian conductor of music
- Grenfell Price (1892–1977), Australian historian and geographer
- Griffith Baley Price (1905–2006), American mathematician
- Guy William Price (1895–1918), Irish naval aviator
- Gwilym A. Price (1895–1985), American lawyer, banker, and industrialist

=== H ===
- Hal Price (1886–1964), American actor
- Hannah Price, British physicist
- Hans Price (1835–1912), English architect
- Harry Price, multiple people
- Harry Price (1881–1948), British researcher of psychical phenomena
- Harry Price (Royal Navy) (1877–1965), British sailor and author
- Haydn Price (1883–1964), Welsh international footballer
- Hayley Price (born 1966), British gymnast
- Henry Price, multiple people
- Henry Bertram Price (1869–1941), Governor of Guam
- Henry Habberley Price (1899–1984), British philosopher
- Hiram Price (1814–1901), American politician
- Hugh Price, multiple people
- Huw Price (born 1953), Australian philosopher

=== I ===
- Idris Price (born 1977), American football player
- Irving Price (1884–1976), toy manufacturer (Fisher-Price)
- Isaac Price (born 2003), English footballer
- Ivan "Hopey" Price (born 2000), British boxer

=== J ===
- Jabari Price (born 1992), American football player
- Jack Price, multiple people
- Jadarian Price (born 2003), American football player
- James Price, multiple people
- Jamieson Price, American voice actor
- Jane Price (1860–1948), Australian artist
- Janet Price (born 1938), Welsh vocalist
- Jayden Price (born 2000), American football player
- Jean Price (1943–2019), American politician
- Jeff Price, American basketball player and coach
- Jenna Price, Australian journalist and academic
- Jennifer Price ((1940–2019), British archaeologist
- Jesse Price (politician) (1863–1939), American politician
- Jesse Price (1909–1974), American jazz drummer
- Jessica Price, American writer, editor, designer and producer of video and tabletop games
- Jill Price (born 1965), American author
- Jim Price, multiple people
- Jo Price (born 1985), Welsh rugby union player and former footballer
- John Price, multiple people
- Jon Price (born 1973), American sports gambler, and entrepreneur
- Jonathan Price, American composer
- Jonelle Price (born 1980), New Zealand equestrian
- Joseph Price, multiple people
- Julia Price (born 1972), former cricketer for Australian women's cricket team
- Julian Price (1867–1946), American business executive
- Julie Price, multiple people

=== K ===
- Karen Price, multiple people
- Katherine E. Price, American Catholic philanthropist
- Kathleen Price Bryan (1900–1984), American philanthropist and clubwoman
- Katie Price (born 1978), British model and media personality
- Katrina Price (1975–1999), American basketball player
- Keith Price (born 1991), American football player
- Kelly Price (born 1973), American singer
- Kenneth Price, multiple people
- Kitty Price (1932– ), American primatologist and conservationist
- Kylie Price (born 1993), musician

=== L ===
- Lance Price (born 1958), United Kingdom politician
- Larme Price (born 1972), American serial killer
- Larry Price, multiple people
- Lauren Price (born 1994), Welsh boxer
- Leah Price (born 1970), American literary critic
- Lee Price, United States Army general
- Lee Price (politician) of America
- Leo Price (1899–1943), English sportsman
- Leonard Price (born 1942), American politician
- Leonardo Price (born 1979), Argentine runner
- Leontyne Price (born 1927), American opera singer
- Lewis Price (born 1984), Welsh footballer
- Lindsay Price (born 1976), American actress
- Lionel Price (1927–2019), British basketball player
- Llewellyn Ivor Price (1905–1980), Brazilian paleontologist
- Lloyd Price (1933–2021), American R&B and rock and roll musician
- Louis Price (born 1953), musician

=== M ===
- Mac Price (1948–2003), New Zealand foreign affairs official
- Makayla Gilliam-Price (born 1998), American social activist
- Mandy Price, American attorney
- Margaret Price (1941–2011), Welsh soprano
- Margaret Price (scholar), American academic
- Margo Price (born 1983), American country singer
- Marian Price (born 1954), Irish Republican
- Maribeth Price (born 1963), American geologist and planetary scientist
- Marie Price, American geographer
- Marilyn Price-Mitchell (born 1949), American psychologist
- Mark Price, multiple people
- Martin Price (1939–1995), British numismatist
- Mary Price, multiple people
- Matthew Price (born 1972), British journalist
- Maurice Price (born 1985), American football player
- Maurice Price (1938–2021), Irish footballer and coach
- Max Price, South African politician
- Mel Price (1920–2014), American musician
- Mick Price (snooker player) (born 1966), English professional snooker player
- Mike Price (born 1946), American football coach
- Mitchell Price (born 1967), American golfer
- Myles Price (born 2001), American football player

=== N ===
- Natalia Price (born 1989), Russian pole vaulter
- Nick Price (born 1957), Zimbabwean golfer
- Niko Price (born 1989), American mixed martial arts fighter

=== O ===
- Olive Price (1903–1991), American author
- Ollie Price (born 2001), English cricketer

=== P ===
- Pamela Price (California politician) (born 1957), American lawyer
- Pamela Price (New Hampshire politician)
- Paul Price, multiple people
- Peerless Price (born 1976), American football wide receiver
- Peter Price, multiple people

=== R ===
- Rachael Price (born 1985), American jazz and blues singer
- Randy Price (born 1957), American politician
- Rayford Price (1937–2023), American politician
- Raymond Price, multiple people
- Rebecca Price, multiple people
- Renee Price, American politician
- Reynolds Price (1933–2011), American man of letters
- Richard Price, multiple people (includes Dick Price and Rick Price
- Riley Price (born 2001), Australian rugby league footballer
- Ritch Price, American college baseball coach
- Robert Price, multiple people
- Rod Price (1947–2005), English musician
- Rod Price (wrestler) (born 1962), American wrestler
- Rodman M. Price (1816–1894), American Democratic Party politician
- Roger Price, multiple people
- Ronald Price Hickman (1932–2011), South African-born automobile designer and inventor
- Ronnie Price (born 1983), professional basketball player
- Rosalia Price (fl. 1790), British circus performer
- Rose Price, multiple people
- Ross Price (born 1944), Australian rules footballer
- Roy Price (born 1967), American businessman
- Ryan Price, multiple people

=== S ===
- Sally Price, multiple people
- Sandra Reynolds Price (born 1934), South African tennis player
- Sarah Price, multiple people
- Scott Price (politician) (born 1962), American politician from Nebraska
- Sean Price (1972–2015), American rapper, one half of the duo Heltah Skeltah
- Sharon Price John (born 1964), American businesswoman
- Shawn Price (born 1970), American football player
- Sherwood Price (1928–2020), American film and television actor
- Shirley Price, American politician from Delaware
- Sol Price (1916–2009), American businessman
- Sophie Price (born 1989), British model
- Stephen Price, multiple people
- Sterling Price (1809–1867), Confederate major general during the American Civil War
- Steve Price (born 1974), Australian rugby league footballer
- Sue Price (born 1965), American bodybuilder and actress
- Susan Price, multiple people

=== T ===
- T. Douglas Price (born 1945), American archaeologist
- Tanner Price (born 1991), American football player
- Taylor Price (born 1987), American football player
- Ted Price (died 2004), American murder victim
- Terry Price, multiple people
- Thomas Price, multiple people
- Tiffany Price, American politician
- Toby Price, Australian motorcycle racer
- Tom Price, multiple people
- Tony Price, multiple people

=== V ===
- Vincent Price (disambiguation), multiple people, including
  - Vincent Price (1911–1993), American actor

=== W ===
- W. G. Price (1865–1952), Australian pipe organist
- Walter Price, multiple people
- William Price, multiple people

== In fiction ==
- Fanny Price, protagonist of Mansfield Park by Jane Austen
- Homer Price, a children's book character
- Eglantine Price, a witch in search of the Amulet of Astoroth in the film Bedknobs and Broomsticks
- Captain John Price, fictional leader of the 22nd Special Air Service Regiment in the 2007 video game Call of Duty 4: Modern Warfare
- Chloe Price, a character in the 2015 video game, Life Is Strange, and the protagonist of its 2017 prequel, Life Is Strange: Before the Storm.
- Derek, Dilys and Norman Price from Fireman Sam
- Tim and Caroline Price, parents of Alex Drake (née Price), a main character of a UK TV-show Life on Mars's sequel Ashes to Ashes.
- Dolores Price, protagonist of She's Come Undone by Wally Lamb

== See also ==
- Welsh surnames
