= John Price =

John Price may refer to:

== Sportsmen ==
- Jack Price (Australian footballer) (1901–1941), Australian rules footballer for Hawthorn
- Jack Price (rugby league), rugby league footballer of the 1920s for Great Britain, England, Broughton Rangers, and Wigan
- John Price (Australian footballer) (born 1944), Australian rules footballer for Hawthorn
- John Price (bowls) (born 1960), Welsh lawn and indoor bowler
- John Price (cricketer, born 1908) (1908–1995), English cricketer
- John Price (cricketer, born 1937), English cricketer, played in 15 Tests, 1964–1972
- John Price (footballer, born 1854) (1854–1907), Welsh international footballer
- John Price (footballer, born 1936), Welsh footballer with Liverpool, Aston Villa, Walsall and Shrewsbury Town
- John Price (rugby union) (born 1938), English rugby union player
- John Price (sailor) (1920–1991), American Olympic sailor
- John B. Price (1883–1954), American football coach
- Johnny Price (1943–1995), English footballer with Burnley, Stockport County and Blackburn Rovers
- Johnny Price (Fulham footballer) (1903–1987), footballer who played as a half back
- Jon Price (born 1973), American sports gambler

== Politicians ==
- John Price (MP for Liskeard), in 1402, MP for Liskeard
- John Price (MP for Cardiganshire) (died 1584), Welsh politician
- John Price (died 1555) (1502–1555), MP for Breconshire, Hereford, Ludlow and Ludgershall
- John Price (died 1602), Welsh politician
- John Price (MP for Flint Boroughs) (?1570–1656), MP for Flint Boroughs
- John Price (MP for Cardiff), Welsh politician who sat in the House of Commons between 1654 and 1659
- John Price (New South Wales politician) (1939–2026), Australian politician, state parliamentary member for Waratah and Maitland, New South Wales
- John Price (South Australian politician) (1882–1941), Australian politician and MHR for Boothby, South Australia
- John Price (Canadian politician) (1883–1956), Canadian politician, member of the Legislative Assembly of British Columbia
- John Giles Price (1808–1857), magistrate and penal administrator, commandant of second convict settlement at Norfolk Island, 1846–1853
- John Price (diplomat) (born 1934), former United States Ambassador to Mauritius and the Seychelles
- John Playfair Price (1905–1988), British diplomat
- John Wiley Price (born 1950), politician in Dallas, Texas, US

== Actors ==
- John Price (1943–1987), English actor in Sam
- John Price (Danish actor) (1913–1996), Danish actor
- Jonathan Pryce (born John Price, 1947), Welsh actor

== Scholars ==
- John Price (Welsh scholar) (1502–1555), author of the first book to be printed in Welsh
- John Price (classical scholar) (1602–1676), classical scholar, publisher and collector of books

== Other people ==
- John Price, the African American man of the 1858 Oberlin–Wellington Rescue
- John Price (British Army officer) (died 1747), general
- John Price (executioner) (c. 1677–1718), English executioner
- John Price (librarian) (1735–1813), Welsh librarian and Anglican priest
- John Arthur Price (1861–1942), British barrister
- John Charles Price, British judge
- John Charles Thomas Price (1955–2000), Australian murder victim stabbed to death by Katherine Knight in a particularly brutal crime
- John D. Price (1892–1957), admiral in the United States Navy
- John E. Price (1827–1906), minister of African Methodist Episcopal Zion Church
- John Elwood Price (1935–1995), African-American composer, pianist, ethnomusicologist and music teacher
- John L. Price, Jr. (1920–2012), showman, impressario, and co-founder of Musicarnival
- Frederick Price (civil servant) (John Frederick Price, 1839–1927), Indian civil servant and translator
- John G. Price (1871–1930), Republican lawyer from the U. S. State of Ohio who served as Ohio Attorney General, 1919–1923
- John MacNeile Price (1843–1922), Surveyor General of Hong Kong

== Fictional characters ==
- Captain John Price (Call of Duty), a fictional character in the Call of Duty series

== See also ==
- Jack Price (disambiguation)
- Jon Peyton Price, British actor in EastEnders 1985–1996
- John Pryce (1828–1903), Welsh clergyman and writer on church history
