= Charles Price =

Charles Price may refer to:

- Charles Price (Royalist) (died 1645), Welsh soldier and politician
- Sir Charles Price, 1st Baronet (1747–1818), British merchant and politician
- Charles Price (swindler) (died 1787), otherwise 'Old Patch', prolific English forger and swindler
- Charles Price (minister) (1807–1891), English-born Congregational minister in colonial Tasmania
- Charles Edward Price (1857–1934), British member of parliament for Edinburgh Central, 1924–1929
- Charles Basil Price (1890–1975), Canadian soldier
- Charles C. Price (1913–2001), American chemist
- Charles D. Price (died 1974), American politician from Virginia
- Charles F. Price (born 1938), American non-fiction author
- Charles F. B. Price (1881–1954), lieutenant general of the United States Marine Corps
- Charles Melvin Price (1905–1988), U.S. congressman
- Charles H. Price II (1931–2012), American businessman and former diplomat
- Charles Price (Welsh politician) (1872–1954), British Member of Parliament for Pembrokeshire, 1906–1918
- Charles Price (Canadian politician) (1888–1957), member of the Legislative Assembly of New Brunswick
- Charlie Price (ice hockey) (1882–1955), Canadian ice hockey player.
- Charlie Price (cricketer) (1917–1997), Australian cricketer and soldier
- SS Charles S. Price, a steel-hulled ship lost on Lake Huron during the Great Lakes storm 1913
- Sir Charles Price (1815 ship)
