= Preisner =

Preisner, Preissner (Polish pronunciation: [ˈpɾajsnɛɾ]) may refer to

- Rio Preisner (1925–2007), a Czech poet, philosopher, translator, and scholar of Czech and German literature
- Stefanie Preissner (born 1988), an Irish writer and actress
- Zbigniew Preisner, born: Zbigniew Antoni Kowalski (born 1955)

== See also ==
- Preis
- Preiss
