= Gerald A. Brooks =

Gerald Brooks (1913-2001)

- Born: Gerald Alvin Brooks; January 6, 1913; Quincy, Illinois, U.S.
- Died: December 30, 2001 (aged 88); Springfield, Missouri, U.S.
- Resting place: Maple Park Cemetery
- Occupation: Teacher

Gerald Brooks (January 6, 1913 – December 30, 2001) was a teacher and civil rights advocate in Springfield, Missouri, United States.

== Career ==
Brooks was born in Quincy, Illinois. At a young age, his mother died, leading him to move to Hannibal, Missouri where he would attend Douglas Highschool. He would later credit his band teacher, Martin A. Lewis, as having a strong influence on him. Following highschool, Brooks would attend Lincoln University in Jefferson City, graduating in 1935 and later attend University of Illinois where he earned his master's degree.

He began his career in Nevada, Missouri in a one-room schoolhouse. Brooks later took a job at Lincoln School in Springfield as the band teacher and first foreign language teacher. He negotiated with local instrument stores to rent to his students, growing the band to become a locally renowned ensemble. After desegregation of schools, Brooks served as music department assistant and French instructor for Springfield Senior High School until 1963, becoming an English, French and band instructor at Glendale High School, until his retirement in 1976.

== Civil work ==
Gerald Brooks was a member of the Mayor's Human Rights Commission and a volunteer for NAACP. He played pivotal roles in integrating job forces of department stores, protesting segregation policies of area businesses in the 1960s. He was a founder of Park Day Reunion at Silver Springs Park (previously the only park where black citizens were permitted) in Springfield. Park Day Reunion is a gathering of the community for sports, games, and fellowship but primarily to honor black Springfieldians and civil rights advocates and their stories. Brooks had many other volunteer interests, such as the Community Youth Center and the local Boy Scout Troop.
