= Angie Hobbs =

British philosopher and academic (born 1961)

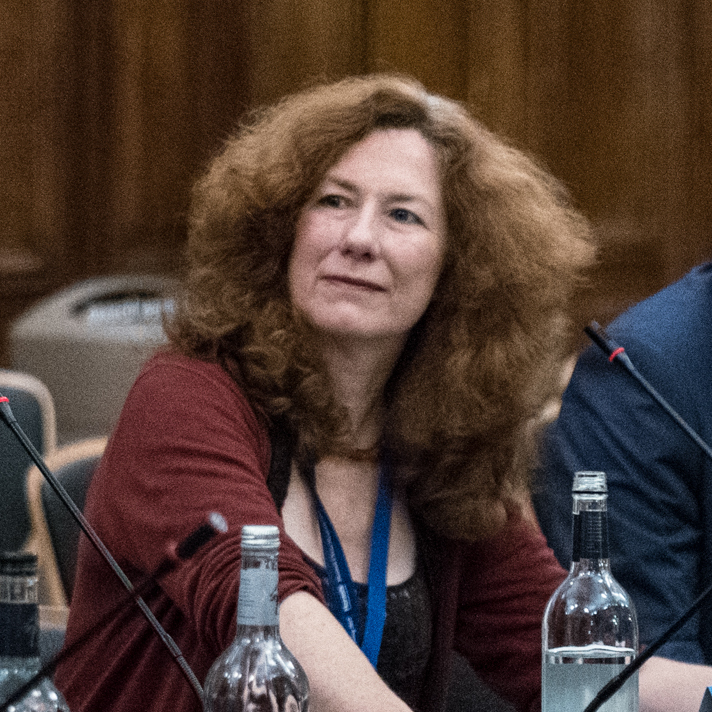
Angie Hobbs, Professor of the Public Understanding in 2017

Angela Hunter "Angie" Hobbs (born 12 June 1961) is a British philosopher and academic, who specialises in Ancient Greek philosophy and ethics. She is Professor of the Public Understanding of Philosophy at the University of Sheffield.

== Early life and education ==
Hobbs was born on 12 June 1961 in Rudgwick, Sussex, England. She was educated at The College of Richard Collyer, a state school in Horsham, West Sussex.

In 1980, Hobbs matriculated into New Hall, Cambridge (now Murray Edwards College, Cambridge). She studied classics, and graduated from the University of Cambridge with a Bachelor of Arts (BA) degree in 1983. She won two prizes during her undergraduate studies: the Park Prize for Classics (awarded by New Hall), and the Henry Arthur Thomas Travel Exhibition (awarded by the Faculty of Classics). As per tradition, her BA was promoted to a Master of Arts (MA Cantab) degree in 1986. She gained a PhD in Classical Philosophy (Cambridge).

== Academic career ==
After a Research Fellowship at Christ's College, Cambridge, Hobbs became Senior Fellow in the Public Understanding of Philosophy and Lecturer in Philosophy at the University of Warwick. She is a specialist in Ancient Greek philosophy with a particular interest in ethics, political theory, and moral psychology.

In April 2012, the University of Sheffield announced Hobbs' appointment as Professor of the Public Understanding of Philosophy, the first such chair in the UK. Hobbs is now preparing a translation of Plato's Symposium, with a commentary, for Oxford University Press.

She contributes to TV and radio programmes. These contributions include BBC Two's Timewatch special "Atlantis: The Evidence", the National Geographic Channel's "Finding Atlantis", the Radio 4 programme In Our Time formerly hosted by Melvyn Bragg, Radio 3 Night Waves and the BBC World Services The Forum.

On 1 February 2015, Hobbs was the castaway on Desert Island Discs on BBC Radio 4.

== Selected works ==
- Signed entries on ‘The Symposium’ and ‘Women’ in The Continuum Companion to Plato (ed. Gerald A. Press). Continuum, 2012.
- ‘On Christopher J. Gill on Particulars, Selves and Individuals in Stoic Philosophy’ in Particulars in Greek Philosophy (ed. R. W. Sharples). Brill: Leiden, 2010.
- Signed entries on ‘Virtue, Philosophical Conceptions of’ and ‘Virtue, Popular Conceptions of’ for The Oxford Encyclopedia of Ancient Greece and Rome (Oxford University Press), 2010.
- ‘Socrates’ in Melvyn Bragg (ed.) In Our Time (a collection of transcripts of 26 programmes selected from several hundred). Hodder and Stoughton, 2009.
- Five revised signed entries for the 3rd ed. of the Concise Oxford Dictionary of Politics (ed. I McLean and A. McMillan): Plato; Aristotle; Greek Political Thought; Socrates; the Sophists. Oxford University Press, 2008.
- ‘Plato on war’ in Maieusis, a Festschrift in honour of Myles Burnyeat, edited by D. Scott . Oxford University Press, 2007.
- ‘Plato and psychic harmony: a recipe for mental health or mental sickness?’ in Philosophical Inquiry; vol. XXIX no. 5 (a special issue dedicated to the relation between ancient philosophy and contemporary bioethics), edited by Ron Polansky and Tony Chu, 2007.
- ‘Female imagery in Plato’ in Plato’s Symposium: Issues in Interpretation and Reception; edited by J. Lesher, D. Nails and F. Sheffield. Center for Hellenic Studies, Trustees for Harvard University Press, 2006.
- Plato and the Hero: Courage, Manliness and the Impersonal Good, Cambridge University Press, 2000.
- Entries on 'Antiphon', 'Callicles', 'Thrasymachus' and the 'Nomos/Physis debate' for the Routledge Encyclopedia of Philosophy, Routledge, 1998.
- 'Commentary on "Aristotle's Function Argument and the Concept of Mental Illness"', Philosophy, Psychiatry, & Psychology; 5, 1998, pp. 209–213
- Entries on 'Plato', 'Aristotle', 'Greek Political Theory', 'Socrates' and the 'Sophists' for The Concise Oxford Dictionary of Politics, Oxford University Press, 1996.
- Hobbs, Angie (7 February 2019). Plato's Republic. illus. Angelo Rinaldi. London: Ladybird Books. ISBN 978-0-7181-8852-8.
