= Alfred Price =

Alfred Price may refer to:

- Alfred Price (engineer) (1838–1907), New Zealand manufacturing engineer
- Alfred Price (cricketer) (1862–1942), English cricketer
- Alfred Price (author) (died 2017), author on aviation and related topics
- Alfred Price (rugby union) (1892–1957), Irish international rugby union player
- Alfred Douglas Price (1860–1921), American businessman and Black community leader
