= Arthur Price (disambiguation) =

Arthur Price is an English company, a manufacturer of cutlery and silverware.

Arthur Price may also refer to the following people:

- Arthur Price (bishop) (1678–1752), Church of Ireland Archbishop of Cashel
- Arthur Price (footballer) (1892–1954), English footballer
- Arthur Price (MP), Member of Parliament for Montgomery
- Arthur Price (speedway rider) (1946–2026), English motorcycle speedway rider
- Arthur Price, onetime president of MTM Enterprises, an American independent production company
- Art Price (born 1962), former linebacker in the National Football League
