= Ernest Rice =

Ernest Rice may refer to:

- Ernest Rice (Royal Navy officer) (1840–1927), British admiral
- Ernest Rice (politician), Lieutenant Governor of Tennessee; see 1907 in the United States § Lieutenant Governors

== See also ==
- Ernie Rice
- Ernest Price (disambiguation)
