= Jack Price =

Jack Price may refer to:

- Jack Price (athlete) (1884–1965), British Olympic runner
- Jack Price (Australian footballer) (1901–1941), Australian rules footballer
- Jack Price (darts) (1928–2006), darts referee
- Jack Price (footballer, born 1877) (1877–after 1903), English football forward with Small Heath, Doncaster Rovers and Stockport County
- Jack Price (footballer, born 1900) (1900–1984), English football fullback with Bristol Rovers, Swindon Town, Brentford and Torquay United
- Jack Price (footballer, born 1918) (1918–2013), English football forward with Hartlepools United and York City
- Jack Price (footballer, born 1992), English football midfielder currently with Shrewsbury Town F.C.
- Jack Price (ice hockey) (1932–2011), Canadian ice hockey defenceman
- Jack Price (rugby league), British rugby league footballer
- Jack Price (rower) (born 1987), Australian rower
- Jack Price (EastEnders), a character in British soap opera EastEnders

== See also ==
- Jack Pryce, Scottish footballer
- John Price (disambiguation)
