= Anthony Price (disambiguation) =

Anthony Price (1928–2019) was a British author.

Anthony Price may also refer to:

- Anthony Price (philosopher) (born 1947), professor of philosophy
- A. J. Price (born 1986), American basketball player

== See also ==
- Tony Price (disambiguation)
- Antony Price (1945–2025), English fashion designer
