= Lincoln School (Springfield, Missouri) =

- U.S. National Register of Historic Places
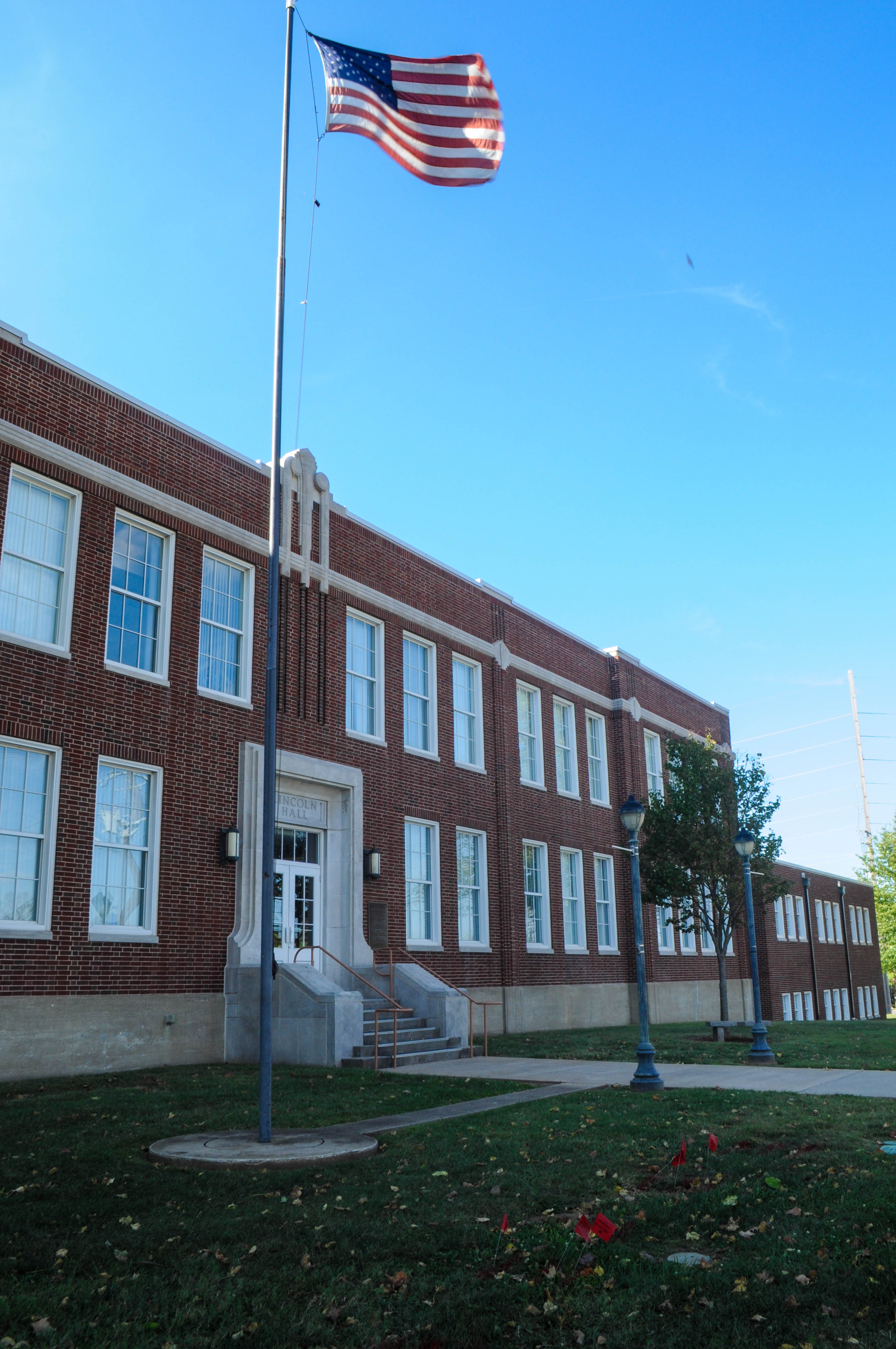
- Location: 815 N. Sherman Ave., Springfield, Missouri
- Coordinates: 37°13′0″N 93°16′53″W
- Area: less than one acre
- Built: 1930
- Built by: M.E. Gillioz
- Architect: William B. Ittner, Hawkins and Nicholas
- Architectural style: Modern Movement
- NRHP reference No.: 00000508
- Added to NRHP: May 31, 2000

Lincoln School, also known as Lincoln Hall, Building A: Graft Vocational and Technical, Eastwood Junior High School, New Lincoln Colored School, is a historic school building located in Springfield, Missouri. The school was constructed in 1930. It has undergone multiple additions, but the main part of the original building remains intact. It was listed on the National Register of Historic Places in 2000.

In 1991, the building became part of Ozarks Technical Community College campus.

== History ==
Lincoln School c. 1931

Built in 1930, the building was designed by supervising architect William B. Ittner and designing architects Hawkins and Nicholas. It is a two-story, Modern Movement style red brick building with a modified "U"-plan and Art-Deco façade. The land was bought for $15,000 by the school board and the building was built by the M.E Gillioz Construction Company.

The school was originally built for African-American students and its construction was funded in part by an $8,000 grant provided by the Rosenwald Foundation. Originally called New Lincoln Colored School, it was called Lincoln School by the end of construction.

=== High School ===
It opened in 1931 with fifteen total rooms and twelve teachers, with an industrial arts emphasis. Lincoln school was the home of Boy Scout troop 35 starting the same year it opened.

In 1932, the students from the closed Douglas School were transferred to Lincoln School. Its presence as Lincoln school ended in 1955 with the Brown v. Board of Education Supreme Court decision to desegregate schools. The last class was given the choice to either transfer to a previously all-white school nearby or stay at the school. When Springfield schools became integrated in the 1955–1956 school year, it was renamed Eastwood Junior High School.

=== Vocational school ===
In 1962, the school closed and became Graff Vocational and Technical School. The building became part of the Ozarks Technical Community College Springfield campus in 1991 and its name was changed to Building A. It was renamed Lincoln Hall in 1998 to honor its history.

Three additions have been made to the building on the north, east, and south sides.

In 2000, it was listed on the National Register of Historic Places.

== Ozarks Technical Community College ==
The building hosts technical education classes and houses and Allied Health education program.

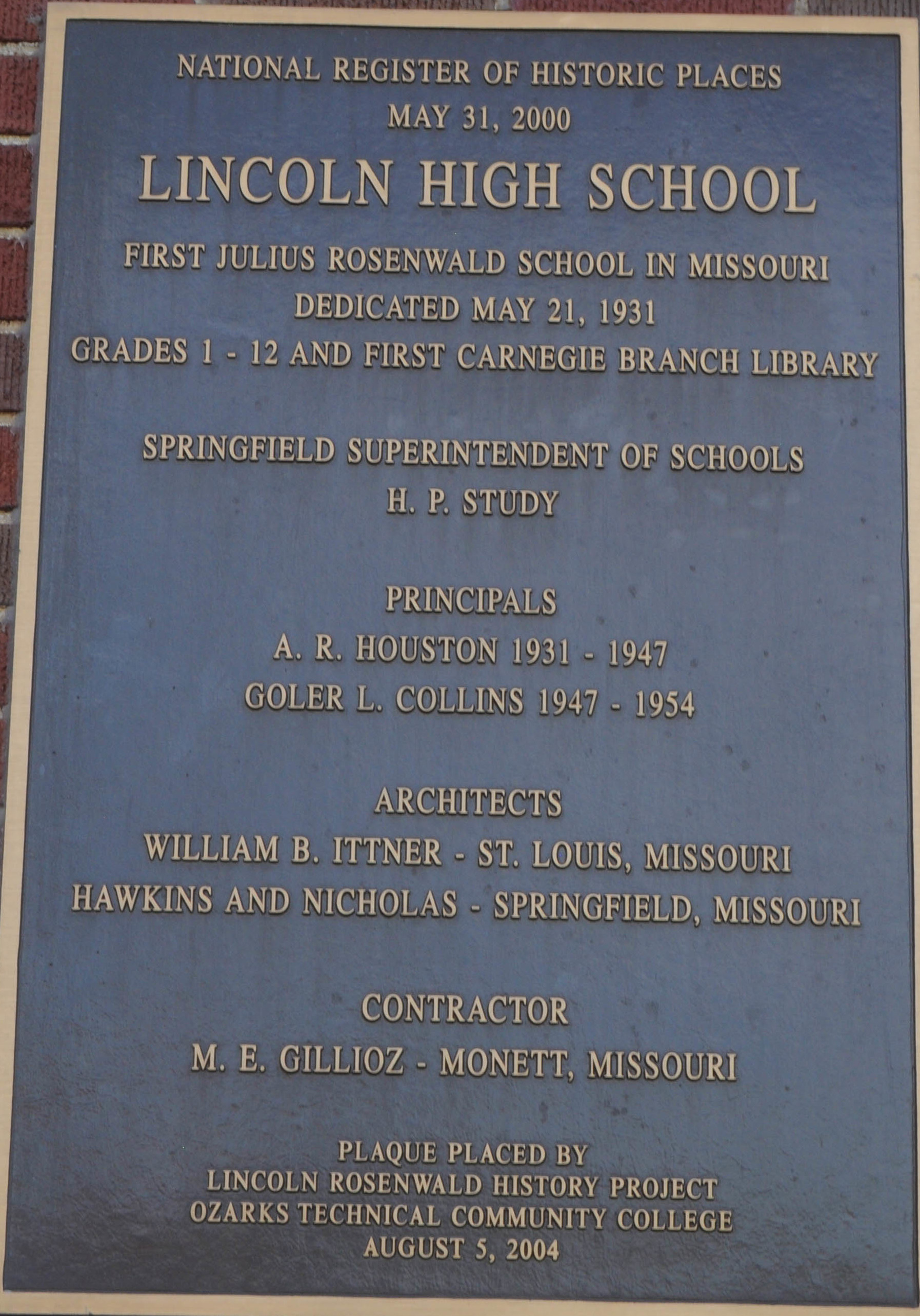
National Register of Historic Places plaque

== Notable alumni ==
- Mary Jean Price Walls, first African American applicant to Missouri State University in 1950. Honorary degree in 2010.
