= Walter Price =

Walter Price may refer to:

- Walter Price (MP), member of parliament for Radnorshire in 1571
- Walter Price (cricketer and umpire) (1834–1894), English cricketer and umpire
- Walter H. Price, one of the 'Four Founding Fathers' of Aston Villa Football Club
- Walter Price (Worcestershire cricketer) (1886–1943), English cricketer
- Walter Price (Australian cricketer) (1886–1944), Australian cricketer
- Walter Price (footballer, born 1896) (1896–?), Welsh footballer
- Walter Price (footballer, born 1921) (1921–1984), English footballer
- Walter Price, a pseudonym of the composer Roger C. Wilson
- Big Walter Price (1917–2012), American blues singer, songwriter and pianist
- Wally Price (1926–2021), Australian rules footballer
- Walter Price (artist) (born 1989), American painter
- Walter Ferris Price (1857–1951), American architect
- Walter Price (Florida politician), state legislator in Florida
