= Preiss =

Preiss is a Germanic surname, and may refer to:

- Ferdinand Preiss (1882–1943), German sculptor
- Balthazar Preiss (1765-1850), Austrian naturalist
- Ludwig Preiss (1811–1883), German naturalist
- Wolfgang Preiss (1910–2002), German actor
- Byron Preiss (1953–2005), U.S. publisher
- Henry Preiss, U.S. airplane designer
- Jeff Preiss, U.S. film-maker

== See also ==
- Preis, Preys
- Preuss
- Price
