= Lawrence Price =

Lawrence or Laurence Price may refer to:

- Laurence Price, balladeer
- Lawrence Price (politician), in United States Senate elections, 1916

== See also ==
- George Lawrence Price, Canadian soldier
- Larry Price (disambiguation)
