= Danny Price =

Danny or Daniel Price may refer to:

- Danny Price (baseball coach), American baseball coach
- Danny Price (boxer) (born 1985), British boxer
- Daniel Buckner Price (1975–2003), American artist
- Daniel Price (priest) (died 1706), Dean of St Asaph
- Dan Price (born 1984), American entrepreneur and media personality
- Dan Price (police commissioner), British politician, police commissioner and engineer
