= Anthony Price (philosopher) =

English professor (born 1947)

Anthony William Price (born 10 December 1947) is emeritus Professor of Philosophy at Birkbeck College, University of London where he taught philosophy from 1995 until 2016. His research relates to Greek ethics and moral psychology, and contemporary ethics. Price was educated at Winchester College and the University of Oxford. He taught at the University of York from 1972 to 1995.

== Selected publications ==
=== Books ===
- Love and Friendship in Plato and Aristotle. (Oxford: Clarendon Press, 1989).
- Mental Conflict (London: Routledge, 1995).
- Contextuality in Practical Reason. (Oxford: Clarendon Press, 2008).
- Virtue and Reason in Plato and Aristotle.(Oxford: Clarendon Press, 2011).

=== Select articles/chapters ===
- "Plato and Freud" In: Christopher J. Gill (ed.), The Person and the Human Mind: Issues in Ancient and Modern Philosophy. Oxford University Press (1990)
- "Wordsworth's Ode on the Intimations of Immortality" In: A. Baldwin & S. Hutton (eds.), Platonism and the English Imagination, Cambridge University Press.(1994)
- "Friendship and Politics", in C. Steel (ed.),The Legacy of Aristotle’s Political Thought (1999), 101-20 and Tijdschrift voor Filosofie 61(1999), 525–45.
- "Egoism and Altruism," Organon (Poland) 37 (2008), 71-9.
- "Are Plato’s Soul-Parts Psychological Subjects?' Ancient Philosophy 29 (2009), 1-15
- "Intuitions of Fittingness," Common Knowledge 15 (2009), 348-6
- "Choice and action in Aristotle." Phronesis 61 (4), (2016) 435-462. ISSN 0031-8868.
- "Generating in beauty for the sake of immortality: personal love and the goals of the lover." In: Destree & Giannopoulou, (eds.) Plato’s Symposium: A Critical Guide, Cambridge University Press (2017)
- "Varieties of Pleasure in Plato and Aristotle" In: Victor Caston (ed.) Oxford Studies in Ancient Philosophy, Volume 52 (2017)

Complete list of publications as of 2009.
