= William Price =

William Price, Will Price, Bill Price, or Billy Price may refer to:

== Business ==
- William Price (merchant) (1789–1867), Canadian lumber merchant and manufacturer of planks
- William Philip Price (1817–1891), British merchant, magistrate and politician
- William Evan Price (1827–1880), Quebec businessman and political figure
- William Price (industrialist) (1860–1938), Welsh farmer and industrialist
- William G. Price Jr. (1869–1960), American businessman and Army general
- William S. Price III, known as Bill Price, co-founder of private equity firm the Texas Pacific Group
- William H. Price, co-founder of Chandler & Price

== Art and entertainment ==
- Bill Price (producer) (1944–2016), producer and engineer
- Billy Price (singer) (born 1949), American soul singer
- Billy Price (actor) (born 2000), English actor
- William Frederick Lake Price (1810–1896), English watercolourist and photographer

== Politics ==
- William Price (MP for Bath) (died 1596), British member of Parliament
- William Price (of Briton Ferry), Welsh politician in the House of Commons (1614–1626)
- William Price (Royalist) (1619–1691), British MP for Merioneth
- William Price (High Sheriff) (1690–1774), high sheriff of two Welsh counties in the 1730s
- William Price (Pennsylvania politician) (died 1875), American politician from Pennsylvania
- William C. Price (1816–1901), treasurer of the United States (1860–1861)
- William T. Price (1824–1886), U.S. representative from Wisconsin
- William P. Price (1835–1908), U.S. representative from Georgia
- William Hubbel Price (1820–1895), American soldier, politician, and minister
- William Edwin Price (1841–1886), British member of parliament for Tewkesbury (1868–1880)
- William Price (Canadian politician) (1867–1924)
- William Price (Australian politician) (1869–1937)
- William Herbert Price (1877–1963), attorney general of Ontario (1926–1934)
- William Price (Labour politician) (1934–1999), British Labour MP for Rugby (1966–1979)
- Bill Price (politician) (born 1935), Queensland Legislative assemblyman
- William Price, British member of parliament for Beaumaris (1558–1567)
- William M. Price, politician and United States Attorney for the Southern District of New York (1834–1838)
- William Jennings Price (1873–1922), ambassador of the United States to Panama (1913–1921)
- William B. Price, Nebraska State Auditor (1933–1935)
- William H. Price, Nebraska State Auditor (1937–1939)

== Sports ==
- William Price (Liverpool and District cricketer) (1859–?), English cricketer
- Bill Price (baseball) (1863–1922), Philadelphia Athletics 1890
- Bill Price (cricketer) (1881–1958), English cricketer
- William Price (Worcestershire cricketer) (1900–1982), English cricketer
- William Price (footballer) (1903–1987), Indian-born English footballer
- William Price (table tennis) (1915–?), American table tennis player
- Billy Price (footballer, born 1917) (1917–1995), English footballer
- Bill Price (curler) (1927–2021), Canadian curler
- Billy Price (footballer, born 1934) (1934–2004), Scottish footballer
- William Price (volleyball) (born 1987), American volleyball player
- Billy Price (American football) (born 1995), American football player
- William Price (swimmer) (born 1951), English swimmer

== Other ==
- William Price (orientalist) (1780–1830), English linguist
- William Price (physician) (1800–1893), Welsh physician
- William Archer Price (1866–1948), photographer
- William Lightfoot Price (1861–1916), American architect
- William Wallace Price (1867–1931), American journalist
- William Price (RAF officer) (1895–1982), British World War I flying ace
- Bill Price (physicist) (1909–1993), Welsh infrared spectroscopist
- William A. Price (1915–2009), reporter for the New York Daily News (1940–1955)
- William Ray Price Jr. (born 1952), chief justice of the Supreme Court of Missouri
- William Redwood Price (1836–1881), American military officer
