= Ozarks Technical Community College =

Public college in Springfield, Missouri, US

- Former name: Heart of the Ozarks Community Technical College (1990–1994)
- Motto: You Have a Dream We Have a Plan
- Type: Public community college
- Established: April 3, 1990
- President: Hal H. Higdon
- Provost: Tracy McGrady
- Students: 10,553
- Location: Springfield, Missouri, U.S.
- Colors: Blue and White
- Mascot: Ozzy the Eagle
- Website: otc.edu
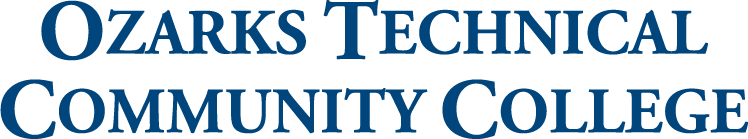

Ozarks Technical Community College (OTC) is a public community college in Springfield, Missouri. It was established by Springfield and thirteen surrounding public school districts on April 3, 1990. It has six locations in southern Missouri. Students can earn a one-year certificate, two-year Associate of Applied Science degree (A.A.S.), Associate of Science (A.S) or Associate of Arts degree (A.A.). It is accredited by the Higher Learning Commission and had a fall 2021 enrollment of 10,506 students.

== History ==
Because of the creation of the Junior College District of Central Southwest Missouri, the college was founded with the name Heart of the Ozarks Community Technical College. Classes were initially held at Cox Medical Center North and in the newly named Graff Hall and Building A, which was formerly owned by Graff Area Vocational Technical Center. The next year, it began offering general education courses located in the North Town Mall.

September 1990 the schools founding president was chosen to be Dr. Norman K. Myers.

In 1994, the schools name was shortened to Ozarks Technical Community College.

In 2003, it became one of the first smoke-free campuses in the country.

== Academics ==
OTC provides accredited certificates, associate degrees, and other technical education programs. The school specializes in technical and vocational programs.

=== Vocational education ===
Beginning its life as Graff Vocational School, OTC continues to offer courses to high school students allowing them to earn college credit prior to graduation.

=== Center for Workforce Development ===
The Center for Workforce Development addresses the ever-changing needs of the Springfield workforce.

=== Bachelor's Program ===
In April 2021, Missouri's Coordinating Board for Higher Education approved the schools plans to offer a four-year program in respiratory therapy.

== Buildings ==
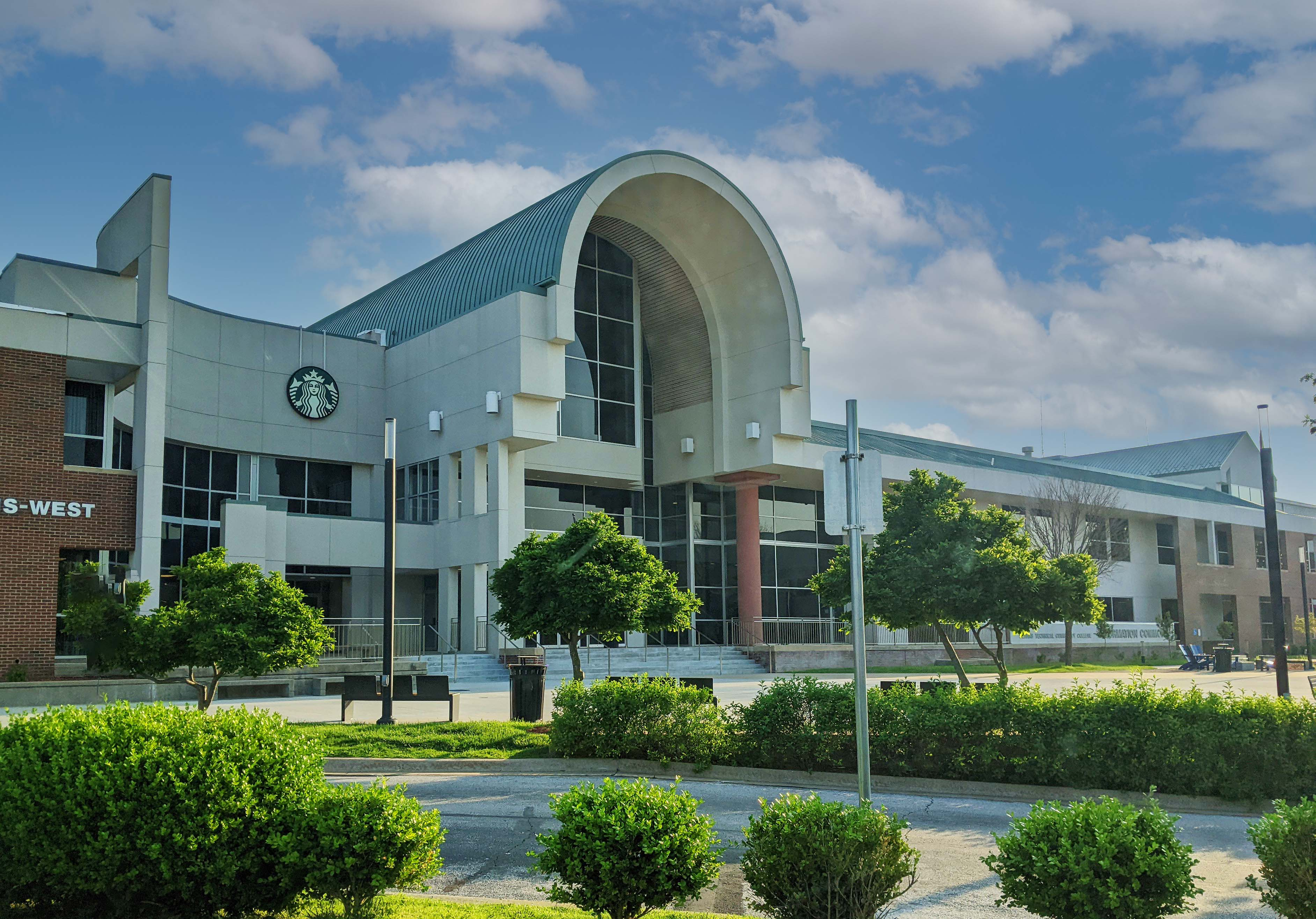
Information Commons

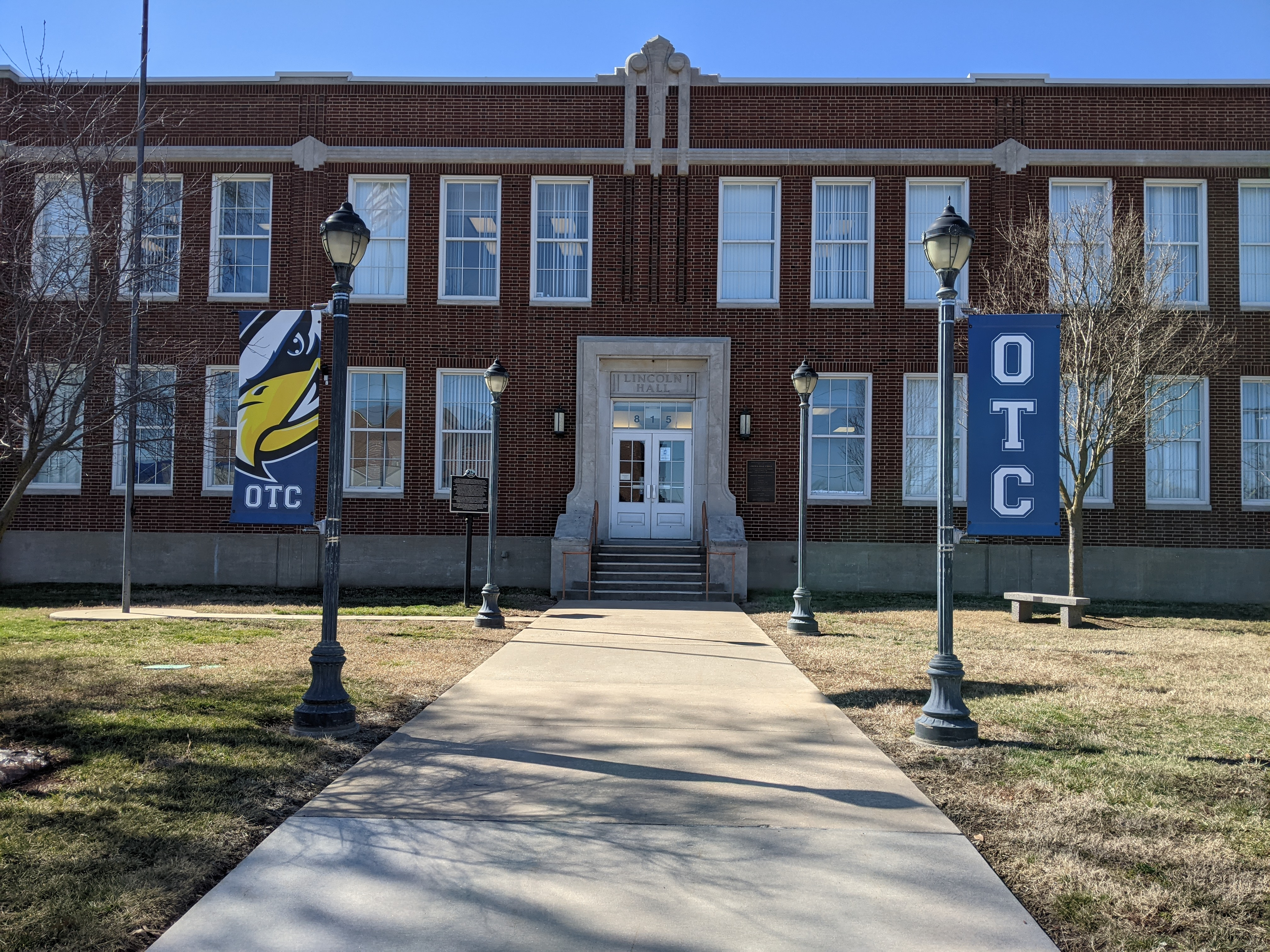
Lincoln Hall

Seven main buildings make up the Springfield campus. Graff Hall, and what is now Lincoln Hall were the first buildings when the college began. Lincoln Hall is listed on the National Register of Historical Places as one of the first African-American schools in Springfield. The Norman K. Meyers building was constructed in 1997

The Robert W. Plaster Center for Advanced Manufacturing is the newest building on the campus built in 2022. It was funded by a property tax levy and private donations.

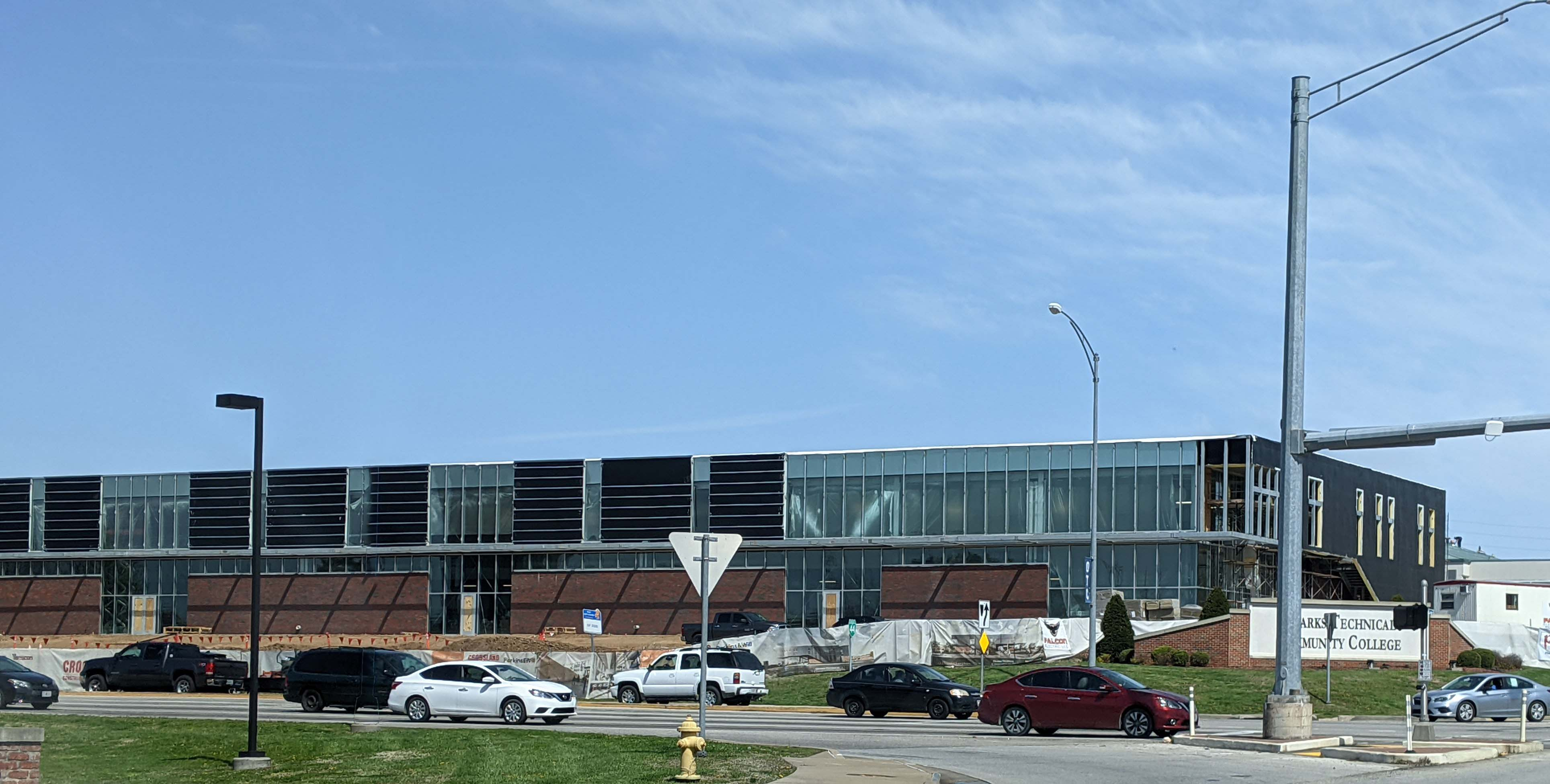
Robert W. Plaster Center for Advanced Manufacturing

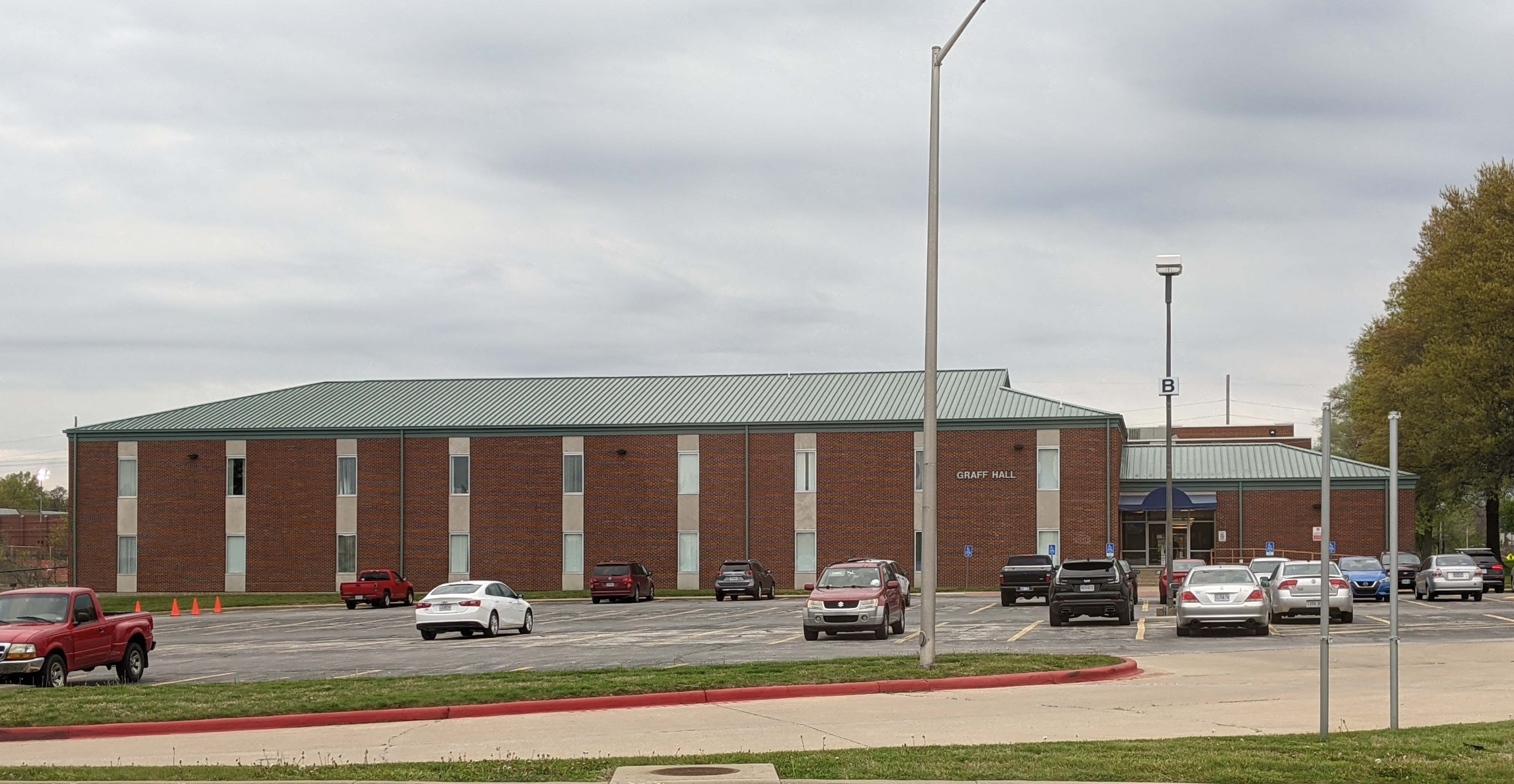
Graff Hall

== Locations ==
The college has six campuses located around the southern Missouri. The main campus is located in Springfield.

- Springfield Campus
- Richwood Valley Campus (opened in 2007)
- Table Rock Campus (opened 2013)
- Lebanon Center
- Republic Center
- Waynesville (opened 2009)

== Notable alumni ==
- Elijah Haahr, former member and speaker of the Missouri House of Representatives
