= Joseph Price =

Joseph or Joe Price may refer to:

- Joseph C. Price (1854–1893), president and a founder of Livingstone College, Salisbury, North Carolina
- Joseph Price (footballer) (fl. 1890s), amateur footballer
- Joe Price (footballer) (1886–1986), Australian rules footballer
- Joe Price (outfielder) (1897–1961), Major League Baseball center fielder
- Joe Price (cricketer) (1928–1992), Welsh cricketer
- Joseph Price (politician) (born 1945), member of the Canadian House of Commons
- Joe Price (pitcher) (born 1956), Major League Baseball pitcher
- Joseph Price (basketball) (fl. 1980s–2014), college basketball coach
- Joseph L. Price (fl. 1982–2015), American professor of sports and religion
- Joe S. Price (1876-1955), public official and politician in Mississippi
- Joseph Price (veterinarian), NIH veterinarian who assisted in the early studies of the membrane oxygenator

== See also ==
- Joseph Price House
