= Terry Price =

Terry Price may refer to:

- Terry Price (rugby) (1945–1993), Welsh dual-code rugby player
- Terry Price (footballer) (born 1945), English former footballer
- Terry Price (golfer) (born 1960), Australian professional golfer
- Terry L. Price (born 1966), American philosopher
