= Mary Price =

Mary Price may refer to:

- Mary Price (alleged spy) (1909–1980), American accused of being a spy for the Soviet Union
- Mary Grant Price (1917–2002), Welsh-American costume designer
- Mary Sue Price, American playwright and scriptwriter
- Mary Elizabeth Price (1877–1965), American impressionist painter
- Mary Violet Leontyne Price (born 1927), American soprano
- Mary Price (bowls) (1943–2023), British lawn bowler
- Mary Price Walls (1932–2020), first African American applicant to Missouri State University
