= Preis =

Preis is a surname. Notable people with the surname include:

- Alfred Preis (1911–1993), Austrian architect
- Ellen Preis (Ellen Müller-Preis) (1912–2007), German-born Austrian Olympic champion foil fencer
- Mary Louise Preis (born 1941), US politician
- Doug Preis (born 1953), American voice actor
- Alexander Preys (1905–1942), Russian playwright

== See also ==
- Preiss
- Price
- Award (disambiguation)
