= Andrew Price =

Andrew Price may refer to:

- Andrew Price (politician) (1854–1909), U.S. representative from Louisiana
- Andrew Price (rugby league) (born 1982), Australian sportsman
- Andrew Price (TV presenter), Welsh TV presenter
- Andy Price, British composer
- Andy Price (artist), American comics artist
- Andrew Price (3D designer), Blender Guru
