= Vincent Price (disambiguation) =

Vincent Price (1911–1993) was an American actor.

Vincent Price may also refer to:

- Vincent Price (cricketer) (1895–1973), English cricketer
- Vincent Price (educator), incumbent president of Duke University
- Vincent Price (architect) (1868–?), railway architect in Brisbane, Queensland, Australia
- "Vincent Price" (song), a 2013 song by Deep Purple from the album Now What?!
- Vincent Price Art Museum, an art museum located at East Los Angeles College
- V. B. Price (Vincent Barrett Price, born 1940), American poet and journalist, son of the actor
