= John Arthur Price =

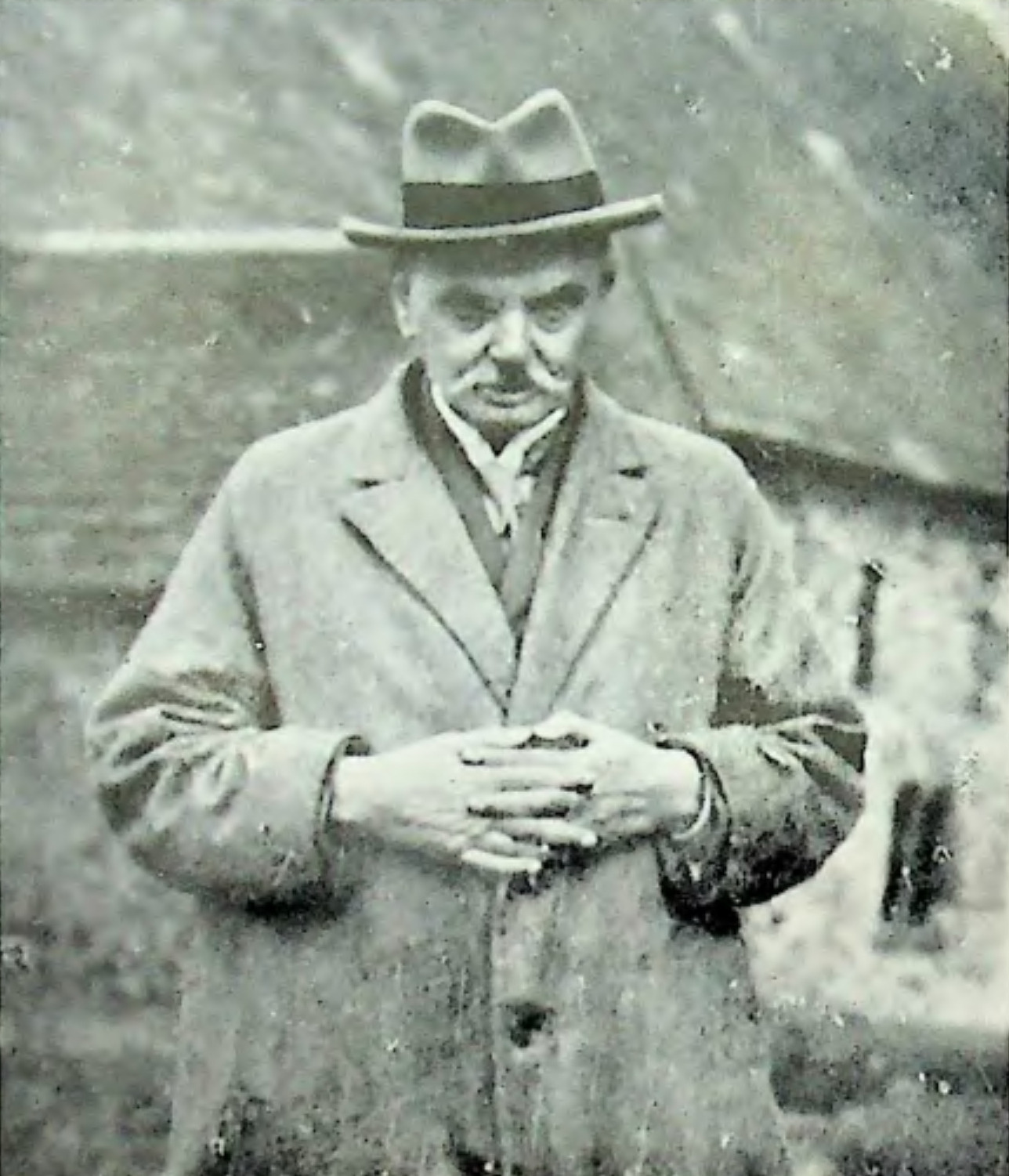
John Arthur Price

John Arthur Price (20 November 1861 – 3 June 1942) was educated at Shrewsbury School and Balliol College, Oxford.

Price became a barrister. He was committed to Liberal values and firm Anglo Catholic beliefs. This unusual combination in the Wales of the 1890s led him to espouse the cause of Disestablishment issuing the so-called "Bangor Scheme".

He wrote well researched articles on T.E. Ellis and Sir Ellis Griffith in Welsh Outlook, and 'Hen Atgofion' (early memories). His originality is stressed by historians such as Kenneth Morgan.

Arthur Price became Chancellor of the Bangor diocese and lived at Egryn Abbey in Merionethshire, his wife's family home.
