= Vincent Price (cricketer) =

English cricketer

Vincent Rains Price (name registered at death as Vincent Ramo Price: 22 May 1895 – 29 May 1973) was an English cricketer. He was born in Sutton, Surrey, educated at Magdalen College, Oxford, and died aged 78 in Bexhill-on-Sea, Sussex.

Price played 38 first-class matches, most of them for Oxford University, and with a single game for Surrey in 1919. In May 1919 at The Parks, Price took a career-best 8/30 against Gentlemen of England. He was awarded a Blue for cricket in the four seasons from 1919 to 1922.

In the passenger list for the S.S. Franconia sailing from Liverpool to New York in 1946 he is shown aged 51 as a "timber agent" and living in Tunbridge Wells.

His brother Herbert played two first-class games for Oxford in 1920 and 1922.
