= Charlie Price (ice hockey) =

Canadian ice hockey player

- Born: April 8, 1882 Montreal, Quebec, Canada
- Died: February 7, 1955 (aged 72)
- Height: 5 ft 9 in (175 cm)
- Weight: 155 lb (70 kg; 11 st 1 lb)
- Position: Defence
- Played for: Montreal Wanderers
- Playing career: 1902–1914

Charles Alexander Price (April 8, 1882 – February 7, 1955) was a Canadian professional ice hockey player. He played with the Montreal Wanderers of the National Hockey Association.
