= Gary Price =

Gary Price may refer to:

- Gary Price (rugby league, born 1961), English rugby league footballer who played for York, Leeds and Featherstone Rovers.
- Gary Price (rugby league, born 1969), English rugby league footballer who played for Wakefield Trinity, Featherstone Rovers and Great Britain.
- Gary Lee Price (born 1955), sculptor
