= Robert Price =

Robert Price or Bob Price may refer to:

== Politics ==
- Robert Price (judge) (1653–1733), British judge and politician
- Sir Robert Price, 2nd Baronet (1786–1857), Member of Parliament
- Sir Robert Price (Liberal politician) (1854–1926), British Member of Parliament for East Norfolk, 1892–1918
- Bob Price (Nevada politician) (1936–2019), Member of the Nevada General Assembly
- Bob Price (Texas politician) (1927–2004), U.S. Representative from Texas
- Robert T. Price (1903–1982), Associate Justice of the Kansas Supreme Court

== Religion ==
- Robert Price (bishop) (died 1666), Bishop of Ferns and Leighlin
- Robert Price (priest) (1905–1981), Anglican priest, Dean of Hereford Cathedral
- Robert M. Price (born 1954), American theologian and writer

== Other ==
- Bobby Price (born 1998), American football player
- Robert Price (1717–1761), English gentleman artist and musician
- Robert Price (engineer) (1929–2008), American electrical engineer
- Robert I. Price (1921–2019), American Coast Guard admiral
- Robert M. Price (business executive) (1930–2020), American computer scientist and business executive, CEO of Control Data Corporation
- Robert Price (attorney) (1932–2016), Commissioner of Investigations, New York State; CEO Price Communications
- Robert Earl Price (1942–2025), African-American playwright and poet
- Bob Price (Canadian football) (born 1955), tight end coach and recruiting coordinator for the Virginia Cavaliers
