= Elizabeth Price =

Elizabeth Price may refer to:

- Elizabeth Price (artist) (born 1966), British artist
- Elizabeth Price (gymnast) (born 1996), American artistic gymnast
- Elizabeth Price (golfer) (1923–2008), English golfer
- Elizabeth Price Foley, American legal scholar
- Elizabeth Price, a character in the Alice series

== See also ==
- Betsy Price, mayor of Fort Worth, Texas
- Elizabeth Price Foley (born 1965), American legal theorist
- Mary Elizabeth Price (1877–1965), American impressionist painter
