= George Price =

George Price may refer to:

- George Price (footballer) (c. 1878–1938), footballer
- George Price (cartoonist) (1901–1995), American cartoonist
- Georgie Price (1901–1964), American vaudeville singer
- George Cadle Price (1919–2011), prime minister of Belize
- George E. Price (1848–1938), member of the West Virginia Senate, 1885–1889
- George Edward Price (1842–1926), UK MP for Devonport
- George Lawrence Price (1892–1918), last soldier of the British Empire killed in combat during World War I
- George McCready Price (1870–1963), Canadian creationist
- George R. Price (1922–1975), US scientist, evolutionary theorist
- George W. Price (c. 1843–1901), self-emancipated slave and member of the North Carolina House and Senate
- George Ward Price (1886–1961), British journalist
