= Catherine Price =

Catherine Price may refer to:

- Character in The Mole (American season 1)
- Katherine E. Price
- Kate Price (actress) (1872–1943)
- Cathy J. Price, British neuroscientist
