= Charles F. Price =

American novelist (born 1938)

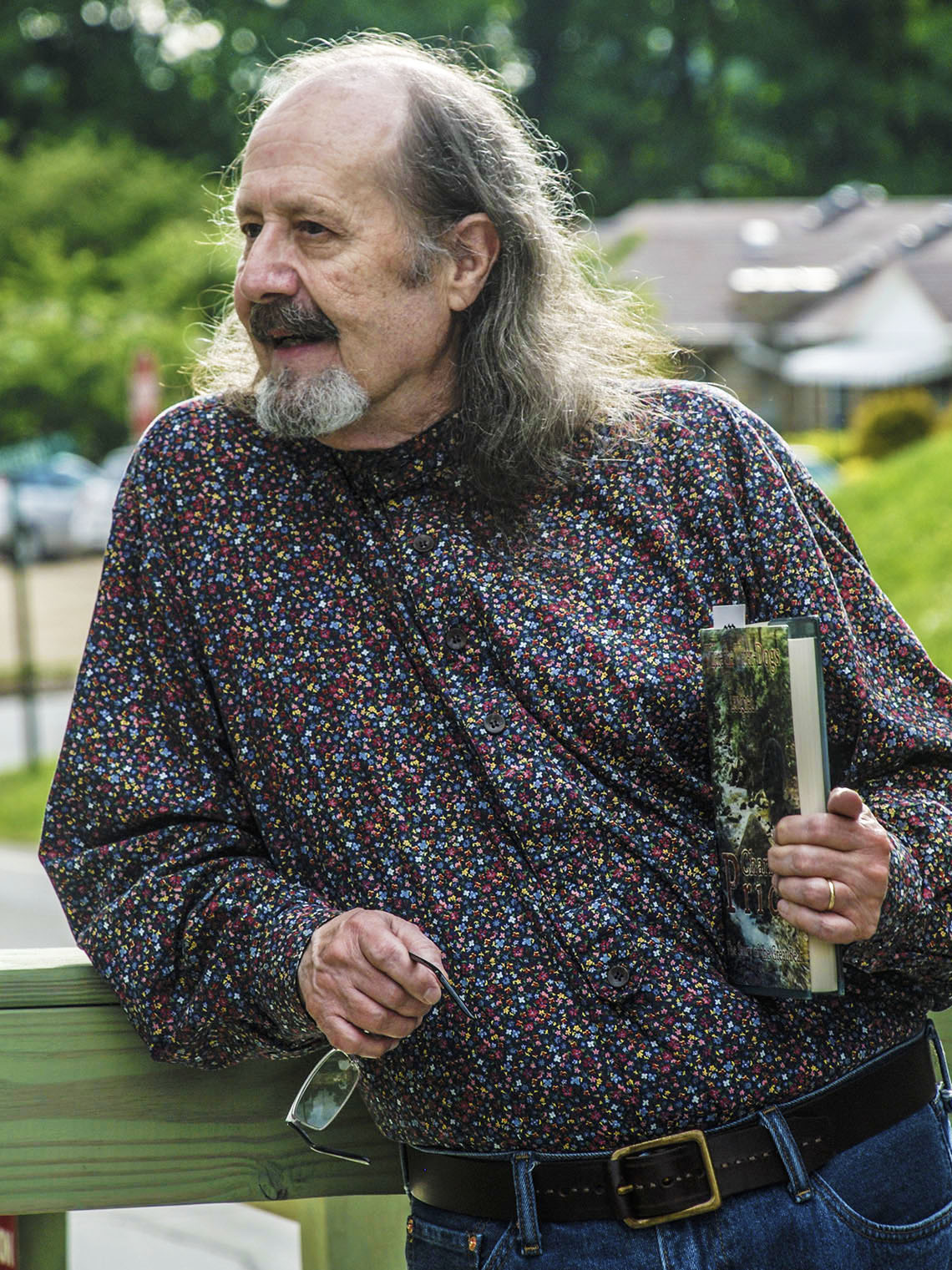
- the author at a 2013 reading in Burnsville, NC
- Born: 1938 (age 87–88); Clyde, North Carolina, U.S.
- Education: High Point University; University of North Carolina at Chapel Hill
- Occupations: Author; essayist; painter; illustrator; sculptor in clay; collector
- Spouse: Ruth Perschbacher of Salida, Colorado
- Writing career
- Subjects: Fiction: Civil War, Revolutionary War, Crusades, Gunfighters, Range Wars; Non-fiction: history of the early Colorado Territory
- Notable works: Hiwassee (1996); Freedom’s Altar (1999); Nor the Battle to the Strong (2008); Season of Terror (2013)
- Notable awards: Sir Walter Raleigh Literary Award

Charles F. Price (born 1938 in Clyde, North Carolina, USA) is an American novelist and historical non-fiction writer whose work covers topics ranging from the Crusades to the American Revolution, to North Carolina in the American Civil War, and to the Texas and Colorado Wild West. Featured writer for the 2009 University of North Carolina at Chapel Hill Library Authors on the Road Program and winner of the 1999 Sir Walter Raleigh Literary Award, a list which includes fellow North Carolinians Reynolds Price (no relation), John Ehle, Ron Rash and Charles Frazier, Price has published five novels, four e-books, one book-length work of historical non-fiction, as well as numerous magazine articles about Western gun fighters. He is also a painter, illustrator, and sculptor in clay.

== Biography ==
Price was born in Clyde, North Carolina, in 1938, to Edgar C. Price, a Methodist minister, and Gertrue [sic] Price. He had one sister, Wanda Price Galloway, who was also a Methodist minister and is now deceased. He graduated Charlotte Central High School in 1957 and High Point College, now High Point University, in 1961 with a BS Degree in Political Science.

Price entered the Army Reserves in 1961, serving six months active duty at Ft. Jackson, South Carolina and fulfilled his six year Reserves commitment in clerical positions before mustering out in 1967.

From 1966 to 1971 he worked as a reporter and feature writer for the Greensboro Record before becoming a planner for the Guilford County, North Carolina planning department. In 1969 he moved to Birmingham, Alabama, to work as a planning consultant for the Rust Engineering Co., and then moved back to Greensboro, North Carolina, to become the Acting Director of the Guilford Planning Department. In 1974 he took a job as Urban Planner and then Project Manager at Linton, Mields, Reisler & Cottone in Washington, DC., where he stayed 20 years before retiring to take up writing full-time. During this period he earned a Master’s Degree in Public Administration from the University of North Carolina at Chapel Hill.

== Writings ==
=== Civil War in the Appalachians ===
Price turn to full-time writing in 1995. Following the critical success of his first novel, Hiwassee, called by Publishers Weekly “forceful and gritty ,” He moved to Burnsville, North Carolina where his sister Wanda Galloway was pastor of the Pensacola United Methodist Church and the Bald Creek Methodist Church. This put him in the heart of the Blue Ridge Mountains where he grew up, and where his father, Edgar C. Price, had been a minister in the Western North Carolina Methodist Conference for nearly half a century, providing the settings, story lines, genealogy and voice for his first four novels.

His second novel, Freedom’s Altar (1996), and his third novel, Cockspur (2002) continued the Price family saga begun by the Civil War era Hiwassee, taking place in the immediate aftermath of the Civil War among the soldiers who returned to their families along the Hiwassee River Publishers Weekly called the book “absorbing and moving historical fiction”. Kirkus Reviews called it “well written, and cutting deeply into the theme of racial prejudice.” Cockspur, which won the Independent Publisher Book Awards for Storyteller of the Year, follows the Civil War veterans introduced earlier as they struggle against the odds imposed on the South by Reconstruction. Publishers Weekly called the work “lyrically written, character-rich, and authentically atmospheric.”

In Where the Water-Dogs Laughed (2003), Price continues the time-line of his family, intertwining a Cherokee myth about a giant bear with the real-life problems the Southern Appalachian farmers faced at the hand of rapacious loggers. Hunter James, reviewer for the Winston-Salem Journal, wrote that this book “brilliantly mines the legends and history of the Southern mountains”

=== Revolutionary War ===
After concluding the Appalachian series, Price turned his attention to the American Revolutionary War, the setting for his fifth novel, Nor the Battle to the Strong (2008). Telling the exploits of Nathanael Greene ascommander of the Southern forces of the Continental Army based out of Charlotte, North Carolina, this book is illustrated with Prices’ own drawings and maps. Winston-Salem Journal reviewer Isabel Zuber called it "a masterful story, carefully researched and wonderfully written, blending fact with a brilliant and vivid imagination." Salisbury Post reviewer Deirdre Parker Smith noted that the novel continues his efforts to make history "relevant to people in the present."

=== E-books ===
Following a dry stretch in which publishers turned down his novels as being part of a genre no longer selling well, Price took three of his favorite Western stories online, venturing into the e-book trade in 2012 with three Kindle books that catered to his own hobby, collecting antique rifles and other memorabilia of the Wild West and Indian Country. A combination of what he calls "vanity," as well as "the troubling prospects of aging" prompted him to make his backlog of unpublished fiction available to Kindle and Nook readers. "The sudden prospect of impermanence smote me with a desire to expose the sum of my life's work as a writer to the world."

Vengeance on the Sweetgrass: A Literary Western, is a tale set amid the 19th century range wars in Wyoming. Above the Caprock is set in Texas, where a Kiowa raiding party has upended the lives of a widowed rancher and the ex-U.S. Army Scout who protects her from gangs and neighboring cattlemen who want to steal her land. Four Sixes to Beat: John Wesley Hardin in El Paso is a tale of short-lived redemption about the West’s most feared gunman. A fourth e-book, Call Down Heaven’s Fire, is a medieval parable closely akin to Price’s own religious evolution as the son of a Methodist minister.

=== Western non-fiction ===
In 2013, Price returned to mainstream publishing, with the publication of his first book-length non-fiction. Published by the University Press of Colorado, Season of Terror: The Espinosas in Central Colorado, March–October, 1863 uncovers some of the brutal and murderous history of the first days of the new Colorado Territory. Historian Stephen J. Leonard, Professor of History and Chairperson of the History Department at the Metropolitan State University of Denver, praises this work as being “more than a detailed and gripping account of a raft of killings.” He explains that Price’s work reveals a much larger picture, spanning centuries of conflict between Anglos and Hispanics and painting such a complex tale of Colorado’s early history so different from today’s modern West “that we can imagine it only with the help of an insightful guide.” Author Marshall Trimble called this book "well-written and well documented" and added that Price's biography of the Espinosas was "an important chapter in the violence and vigilantism that plagued the West during the Civil War." Climbing in the first month of publication to the number three spot on the Denver area bookstores' nonfiction Best Sellers list, one reviewer said his book "contains horror and tragedy, but also moments of grace and scene-circling post-mortems."

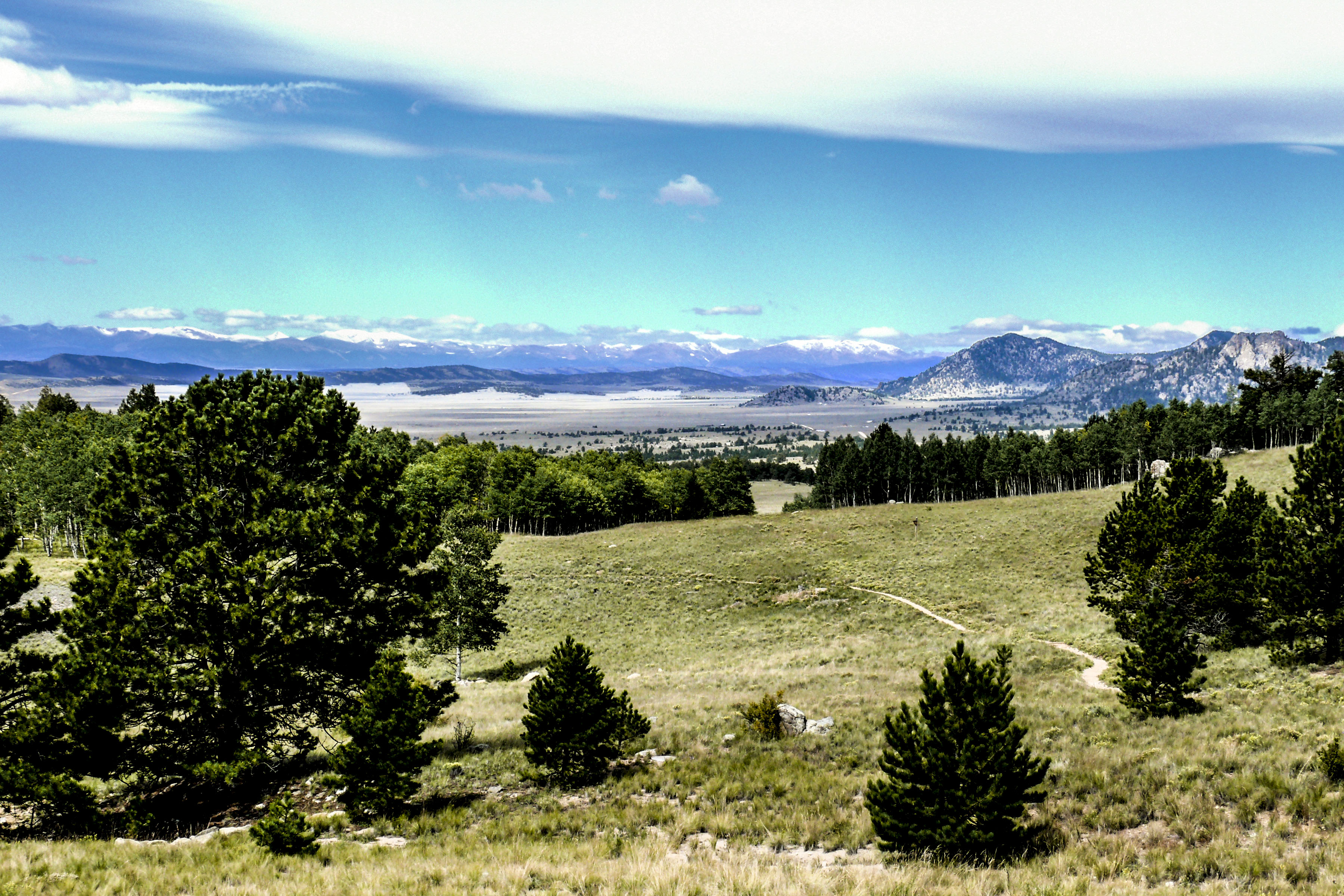
Author photo of South Park, Colorado, showing where much of the Espinosas' rampage took place.

== Civic endeavors ==
As part of his city planning career, Price joined a non-profit effort to improve the livability of communities by promoting quality of life, economic development, social equity and the effectiveness of arts and culture in community building. He is a co-author of a book about this effort, edited by Bob McNulty, President of Partners for Livable Communities.

As part of his literary career, Price and his wife Ruth founded the Carolina Mountains Literary Festival, an event held each September in Burnsville, North Carolina, that attracts several dozen writers and poets of regional and national renown, along with 400 to 500 participants from across the country as well as middle-schoolers from surrounding communities.

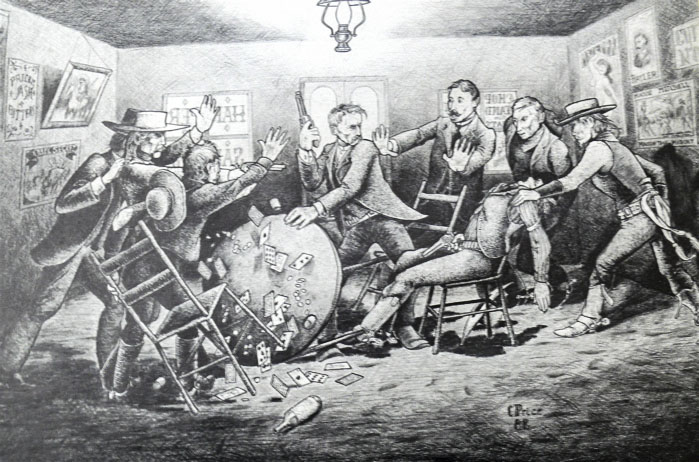
sketch by Charles F. Price of Wild West bar fight

== Literary themes and styles ==
=== Family history ===
Price's first four novels are based on paternal family history gleaned from letters, diaries, and troop rosters and pension records from the National Archives that detailed the actions and movements of many of his Western North Carolina ancestors during and immediately after the Civil War. "I began to weave a story around their lives so they were characters as witness to the history happening around them," he explained.

In his first novel, Hiawassee, for example, all of the central characters, including his own direct ancestor, Oliver Price, are well documented from the actual muster rolls of the 39th and 65th North Carolina and 39th Georgia regiments.

Price also draws heavily on family lore from his mother's side. Nor the Battle to the Strong was based in part on the Revolutionary War experiences of James Johnson, "a Scots immigrant and absconded indentured servant who lived through the bloody events depicted in this novel to become one of the author's maternal ancestors."

=== Research and travel ===
An avid researcher, Price has also relied on the help of state historians and regional museums. Much of the content of Season of Terror is based on newspaper accounts from the 1860s, which avidly covered the eventual hunting down and beheading of the Espinosa brothers at the hands of US Army Scout Thomas Tate Tobin. Extensive travel through south-central Colorado while researching this book, which is illustrated with his own photographs and maps, added local color and authenticity.

=== Preacher's son ===
Price uses his experience as the son of a Methodist minister, also using help from naturalists from the areas he writes about. For example, the Historical Novel Society called his Nor The Battle to the Strong “a treasure trove of detail.” Britt Kaufmann, reviewer for Solander Magazine, described his efforts to bring history to life this way: "Even though he binds himself to accuracy as tightly as a traditional historian, it is through the freedom of fiction that Price is able to provide insight into history, thereby sparking a reader's insight into contemporary life. Price's commitment to research and 'determined specificity' create a vividness whereby readers see the events of the past not in the form of entertainment, but as ugly and as graceful as they really were." The Christian Science Monitor put it this way: "Price's beautifully evocative prose imparts a sense of immediacy to the landscape of valley, hill, field, stream and forest."

Price is also noted for his gritty and realistic characterizations of the rough people who populate his novels. Kirkus Reviews described them this way: “The salty, exact language, tough-minded views, hard lives, and bloody deeds of these characters ring true throughout.”

Price is a collector of antique guns, but his work does not glorify the revolutionary and Civil War battles featured in his earlier novels, but rather "conveys the menace of war's depredations on the daily lives of ordinary people who thought they were involved in a gallant cause, only to be brought face to face with its uglier realities." The many strong female characters that dominate his work show how terrible war is on the families left behind. Rob Neufeld, an historian from Asheville, North Carolina and columnist for the Asheville Citizen-Times, writes that Price’s characters “dictate an unfashionable level of realism.” Noting that Price’s father was a Methodist minister, he adds that Price’s writing seeks to resolve “the disturbing chasm between the gentle religion in which he'd been raised and the soulless horrors that plague us still.”

Price says of his own writing that it reflects the essential truthfulness of what he calls his own deeply flawed life: “The vital ingredient is the truth of one’s life—the triumphs, blunders, humiliations, joy, pain, the whole mix of experiences. It all deserves reflection; it is the stuff that truthful writing is made of.”

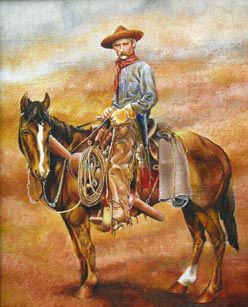
Montana Cowboy by Charles F. Price

== Artwork ==
Price’s fiction and non-fiction are often illustrated by his own maps, sketches and paintings “that are skillfully rendered.” He also sculpts in clay. His work may be seen at his website.

== Published works ==
Price has five published novels, as well as one book-length work of historical non-fiction, numerous magazine articles about the history of the American frontier, four e-books and an essay in an anthology about the Revolutionary War.

=== Novels ===
- Hiwassee: A novel of the Civil War. Academy Chicago. 1996.
- Freedom’s Altar. John F. Blair. 1999.
- The Cock’s Spur. John F. Blair. 2002
- Where the Water-Dogs Laughed: The Story of the Great Bear. High County. 2003
- Nor the Battle to the Strong: A Novel of the American Revolution in the South. Frederic C. Beil. 2008.

=== Book-length nonfiction ===
- Season of Terror: The Espinosas in Central Colorado, March–October, 1863. UP of Colorado (Timberline Books). 2013

=== E-books ===
- Vengeance on the Sweetgrass: A literary Western (Oct. 13, 2012)
- Above the Caprock (Nov. 30, 2012)
- Four Sixes to Beat: John Wesley Hardin in El Paso (Dec. 15, 2012)
- Call down Heaven’s Fire (Jan. 4, 2013)

=== Magazine articles ===
- “The Rampage of the Espinosas.” Colorado Central Magazine. October–November, 2008.
- “Espinosa Scapegoating Goes Awry: The Strange Case of Capt. E. Wayne Eaton.” Colorado Central Magazine. April–May, 2009.
- “Doc Holliday in Salida: Sightseeing or Deadly Business?” Colorado Central Magazine. February–March, 2010.
- “Bat Masterson: Buena Vista Marshal?” Colorado Central Magazine. September–October, 2010.
- “The Fading of a Legend: Doc Holliday in Leadville.” Colorado Central Magazine. May, 2012.

=== Anthology ===
- “Cavalry Operations at Eutaw Springs.” Cavalry of the American Revolution, edited by Dr. Jim Piecuch. Westholme Publishing. 2012.
