= Craig Price =

Craig Price may refer to:

- Craig Price (murderer) (born 1973), serial killer in Rhode Island
- Craig Price (rugby union) (born 1989), Welsh rugby union player
