= Hugh Price =

Hugh Price may refer to:

- Hugh Price (intelligence), former senior official in the Central Intelligence Agency
- Hugh Price (lawyer) (c. 1495–1574), Welsh lawyer and cleric; founder of Jesus College, Oxford
- Hugh Bernard Price (born 1941), U.S. activist for African-American causes
- Hugh H. Price (1859–1904), U.S. Representative from Wisconsin
