= Arthur Price =

British cutlery company

- Founded: 1902 in Birmingham
- Headquarters: Sheffield, England
- Products: Cutlery and silverware
- Website: www.arthurprice.com

Arthur Price is a Sheffield-based manufacturer of cutlery and silverware, originally established in Birmingham, England in 1902, and later moving to Sheffield. It opened a subsidiary plant again in Birmingham and by the 1950s was the biggest manufacturer of stainless steel cutlery in the country. By the 1990s, the company had shifted towards provision, supply and branding, rather than manufacture, of cutlery. It has been owned and managed by five generations of the Price family.

== Company history ==
Arthur Price has been called a traditional English family-owned company. Arthur Price himself was born on 3 March 1865, and as a young man spent two decades employed in the flatware industry before setting up his own company in Aston, Birmingham, in the name of Arthur Price of England, Master Cutlers & Silversmiths. In 1912 the company was commissioned to supply the top-range of cutlery for RMS Titanic's maiden voyage.

The company was adaptable in adverse economic conditions, says Bryson. It successfully adjusted its business strategy during the 1940s and 1950s as both the nature of technology and labour changed and consumerism became a growing influence on manufacturing. In the 1940s, he says it was a "factory-led" company, in that the company was driven by what it could produce. In contrast, by the following decade, there was a growing shift towards a consumer-driven economy. The difference for Arthur Price was that, in the latter period, the company tailored production to what was wanted. (Note: This process, says Bryson, is indicative of the economic approach he calls "place-based investment", in which a manufacturer invests in either accessing markets or accessing labour and materials.) By this time, it had become the largest manufacturer of stainless steel cutlery in Britain, and was the first to use chromium plating in its production.

In 1964, John Price (grandson of the founding Price) renamed the firm Arthur Price. By the 1970s, the company began focusing on high end, rather than popular, cutlery sets. On the one hand, this emphasised the craft skillset the company possessed but conversely necessitated the introduction of new precision techniques and technologies. In 1971, Arthur Price opened a factory in Saltley, Birmingham. The local Community Development Project expressed itself unsure as to the impact the company would make in the area, as it was employing "less than 200 workers, and its position seems very insecure". At the same time, John Price launched what David Hey has described as "a vigorous marketing campaign" which emphasised the exclusivity of the company's designs to British department stores. (Note: In direct response to Price's campaign, a major competitor, Viners attempted to undercut Arthur Price by importing low-cost blanks from Hong Kong and imprinting them with their hallmark. This was a controversial business strategy for the period, and, says David Hey, suggests that Price's campaign had placed Viners in a "desperate" position. However, the strategy also allowed further investment in technology by reducing companies' labour costs.)

Arthur Price survived as a family firm, but now production has been outsourced and offshored as the copay's focus has shifted from manufacturing to designing, sourcing and marketing cutlery.

— A. Bryson

In 1992, the company began importing products for resale; up until that point, everything sold had been made in Sheffield. This, suggests Bryson, reflected the strained market cutlery manufacturers generally—and Arthur Price particularly—were now operating in. Reflecting the fact that, by now, surveys indicated that most consumers were unwilling to pay more than £100 for a six-person set. Arthur Price's entry into the import market followed their competitors; Simon Price—the founder's great-grandson—suggested that "no leading cutler in Europe was without a lower end of imports" at the time, and that his firm was no exception in. As a result, Arthur Price products were formed into two divisions and would be hallmarked and marketed as either International—those that were imports—or of England, if they had been made in Sheffield. By this time, one commentator has observed, the company was in effect "not a production facility so much as a service", as it manufactured to order, on behalf of hotel chains and kitchen designers.

The transformation of Arthur Price from an industrial manufacturer to the mass market, to a service provider to other industries, has been used to illustrate the decline of Britain's manufacturing and the growth of its service industry. (Note: Arthur Price's then-managing director, John Price (grandson of the founding Price), interviewed in 1977, estimated that employment within the cutlery industry had shrunk from 50,000 (in his living memory) to between 2,500 and 3,000 by the middle of the decade.)

As of 2018, the company held a royal warrant to supply the Prince of Wales (later King Charles III) and was a member of the Cutlers' Company.
