= Alfred Price (rugby union) =

Ireland international rugby union player (1892-1957)

- Full name: Alfred Henry Price
- Born: 25 April 1892 Glenbeigh, County Kerry, Ireland
- Died: 17 March 1957 (aged 64) Twyford, Berkshire, England

Rugby union career
- Position: Front row
International career
Years	Team	Apps	(Points)
1920	Ireland	2	(3)

Alfred Henry Price (25 April 1892 — 17 March 1957) was an Irish international rugby union player.

Born in Glenbeigh, County Kerry, Price was a doctor by profession and served overseas as a Surgeon lieutenant in the Royal Navy, before gaining two Ireland caps as a front row forward in 1920. He debuted against Scotland at Inverleith, missed the next match with injury, then scored a try in a loss to France. His club rugby was played for Dublin University.

Price spent most of the 1920s as a medical officer in Ceylon.

Moving to Reading, Price was partner in a medical practice with the town's former mayor Sir George Stewart Abram.

== See also ==
- List of Ireland national rugby union players
