= Tony Price =

Tony Price may refer to:

- Tony Price (artist) (1937–2000)
- Tony Price (basketball) (born 1957), former NBA player

== See also ==
- Toni Price (1961–2024), American country blues singer
- Anthony Price (disambiguation)
