= Richard Price (disambiguation) =

Richard Price (1723–1791) was a Welsh philosopher and an English Unitarian minister, credited with founding actuarial science and mentoring Mary Wollstonecraft.

Richard Price may also refer to:

== Politics ==
- Richard Price (Brecon MP) (c.1538–c.1587), member of parliament (MP) for Brecon, 1571
- Richard Price (Wales MP), Welsh politician who sat in the House of Commons in 1653
- Richard Price (Radnor MP) (1773–1861), British member of parliament for Radnor
- Richard Price (New South Wales politician) (1864–1936), New South Wales Legislative Assembly member, 1894–1904, 1907–1922
- Richard Thelwall Price, British member of parliament for Beaumaris, 1754–1768
- Dick Price (politician) (1933–2025), American politician in Florida

== Arts ==
- Rick Price (born 1961), Australian singer-songwriter
- Richard Price (writer) (born 1949), American novelist and screenwriter
- Rick Price (bassist) (1944–2022), English bassist
- Richard Price (poet) (born 1966), Scottish poet

== Sports ==
- Dick Price (footballer) (1891–1965), Australian rules footballer
- Dick Price (coach) (1933–2009), American football and track and field coach, college athletics administrator
- Rick Price (golfer) (born 1968), American golfer

== Others ==
- Dick Price (1930–1985), American founder of Esalen
- Richard Price (barrister) (1790–1833), British antiquarian and literary editor
- Richard Price (American anthropologist) (born 1941), American ethnographic historian
- Richard H. Price (born 1943), American theoretical physicist
- Richard Price (businessman), British entrepreneur

== See also ==
- Richard Pryce (1864-1942), British author
- Richard Pryse (of Gogerddan) (died 1623), Welsh MP
- Pryse baronets
