= Roger Price =

Roger Price is the name of:

- Roger Price (humorist) (1918–1990), American humorist and publisher
- Roger Price (television producer) (born 1941), English television producer
- Roger Price (Australian politician) (born 1945), Australian former politician
- Roger Price (British politician), member of the Parliament of England for Buckingham in the early 18th century
- Roger Price, American minister and rector of King's Chapel (1729-1746)
