= Betty Price =

Betty Price may refer to:

- Betty Price, wife of televangelist, pastor, and author Frederick K. C. Price
- Betty Price (arts advisor) (1931–2023), executive director of the Oklahoma Arts Council
- Betty Price (politician) (born 1952), member of the Georgia House of Representatives
