= Andrew Price (TV presenter) =

Andrew Thomas Price is presenter of the ITV Cymru Wales programme Coast & Country. The series began in October 2013.

In November 2014, Price appeared in Jamie Oliver's Food Tube series in an episode focusing on foraging and cooking in the Gower Peninsula of South Wales.

== Personal life ==
Price first became interested in bushcraft as a child when his grandfather showed him how to collect mussels and periwinkles on the South Gower Coast. As a teenager he was a member of 215 Air Training Corps where he learned marksmanship, and logged numerous hours flying Gliders, and powered aircraft such as the Chipmunk.

In 1992 he participated on a Raleigh International Expedition to Malaysia where he spent time living with the Orang Asli people of the Cameron Highlands, and developed a love for the Rainforest.

Since then, he has spent time with indigenous tribes and survival specialists in Sweden, Malaysia and other countries.

== Dryad Bushcraft ==
Price founded and runs a Swansea Bay-based company called www.dryadbushcraft.co.uk which is one of the UK's leading bushcraft and wilderness survival training organizations.

The company was featured in the Radio Times magazine in November 2014. They said: "[This is] an excellent way to play at being Ray Mears for the day. We joined an afternoon session in the forest and learnt invaluable fire lighting techniques, shelter building, wilderness cooking and knife skills in the great outdoors".
