= Maribeth Price =

American geologist and planetary scientist

- Born: Maribeth Hughett Price; 1963 (age 62–63); Portsmouth, Virginia, U.S.
- Education: Palo Alto High School; Dartmouth College (BA); Princeton University (MA)/(PhD)
- Occupations: Geologist and planetary scientist
- Scientific career
- Workplaces: United States Geological Survey; James E. Martin Paleontology Research Laboratory

Maribeth Hughett Price (born 1963) is an American geologist and planetary scientist whose research concerns the geology of Venus, and particularly volcanism on Venus. She is also known as the author of the book Mastering ArcGIS. Price is dean of graduate education at the South Dakota School of Mines and Technology.

== Education and career ==
Price was born in 1963 in Portsmouth, Virginia, moved with her family as a child to Palo Alto, California, and graduated from Palo Alto High School in 1981. She majored in earth science at Dartmouth College, earning a bachelor's degree in 1985, with Phi Beta Kappa honors. After working for two years for the United States Geological Survey, she went to Princeton University for graduate study in geosciences. She earned a master's degree there in 1989, and completed her Ph.D. in 1995. Her dissertation, Dating resurfacing on Venus using impact crater densities from GIS-based global mapping, was supervised by John Suppe.

She joined the South Dakota School of Mines and Technology in 1995, as an assistant professor of geology and geological engineering. She was promoted to associate professor in 2003 and full professor in 2010, chaired the department from 2006 to 2011, and became map curator for the James E. Martin Paleontology Research Laboratory in 2011. She was named dean of graduate education in 2017.

== Books ==
Price's book Mastering ArcGIS (2004; 8th ed., McGraw Hill, 2019) concerns the ArcGIS software for geographic information system services. She is also the author of Mastering ArcGIS Pro (2015; 2nd ed., 2020) and of Switching to ArcGIS Pro from ArcMap (ESRI Press, 2019; 2nd ed., 2022).
