= Arthur Price (footballer) =

English footballer

Personal information
- Full name: Arthur Price
- Date of birth: Q3 1892
- Place of birth: Sheffield, England
- Date of death: 1954 (aged 61–62)
- Height: 5 ft 9 in (1.75 m)
- Position: Inside forward

Senior career*
Years	Team	Apps	(Gls)
1910–1911	Sharrow Old Boys		
1911–1912	Worksop Town		
1912–1919	Leeds City	78	(26)
1919–1922	The Wednesday	78	(3)
1922–1923	Southend United	1	(0)
1924	Scunthorpe & Lindsey United		
1925	Bakewell		
Total		157	(29)
- * Club domestic league appearances and goals

Arthur Price (1892–1954) was an English footballer who played in the Football League for Leeds City, Southend United and The Wednesday.
