= Jim Price =

Jim Price may refer to:

- Jim Price (tight end) (born 1966), American football tight end
- Jim Price (linebacker) (1940–2012), American football linebacker
- Jim Price (catcher) (1941–2023), American baseball catcher and sportscaster
- Jim Price (baseball manager) (1847–1925), American baseball manager
- Jim Price (basketball) (born 1949), American basketball player
- Jim Price (musician) (born 1945), American record producer and session musician

== See also ==
- Jimmy Price (born 1960), British boxer
- James Price (disambiguation)
