= Harry Price (disambiguation) =

Harry Price (1881–1948) was a British psychic researcher and author.

Harry Price may also refer to:

- Harry Price (cricketer) (1923–1991), Western Australia fast bowler
- Harry Price (fictional character), a character in the Sharpe novels
- Harry Price (Royal Navy seaman) (1877–1965), Royal Navy sailor and author

== See also ==
- Henry Price (disambiguation)
