= John Price (Australian footballer) =

Australian rules footballer

Personal information
- Full name: John Price
- Born: 24 September 1944 (age 82)
- Height: 191 cm (6 ft 3 in)
- Weight: 85 kg (187 lb)

Playing career^{1}
Years	Club	Games (Goals)
1965	Hawthorn	4 (0)
- ^{1} Playing statistics correct to the end of 1965.

John Price (born 24 September 1944) is a former Australian rules footballer who played with Hawthorn in the Victorian Football League (VFL).
