= Ryan Price =

Ryan Price may refer to:

- Ryan Price (trainer) (1912–1986), British horse trainer
- Ryan Price (English footballer) (born 1970)
