= Julie Price =

Julie Price may refer to:

- Julie Arthur (née Price, born 1966/67), wife of the former Prime Minister of Barbados Owen Arthur
- Julie Price (bassoonist) (born 1965), English bassoonist
- Julie C. Price, American physicist and professor of radiology
