= Peter Price =

Peter or Pete Price may refer to:

- Peter O. Price (born 1940), former journalist and CEO of the National Academy of Television Arts and Sciences
- Peter Price (bishop) (born 1944), English bishop
- Peter Price (politician) (born 1942), English politician
- Peter Price (footballer, born 1932) (1932–2015), Scottish footballer (Ayr United)
- Peter Price (footballer, born 1949), Welsh footballer (Peterborough United, Barnsley)
- Pete Price (born 1946), English disc jockey
- Peter Xavier Price (born 1985), British artist, illustrator and academic historian
