= Sally Price =

Sally Price may refer to:

- Sally Price (anthropologist) (born 1943), American anthropologist
- Sally Price (chemist), professor of chemistry at University College London
