= Raymond Price =

Ray Price (1926–2013) was an American country music singer-songwriter and guitarist

Raymond or Ray Price may also refer to:

- Raymond Price (rugby) (c. 1920–1988), Welsh rugby union and rugby league footballer of the 1940s and 1950s
- Ray Price (speechwriter) (1930–2019), U.S. President Richard M. Nixon's chief speechwriter from 1969 to 1974
- Raymond A. Price (1933–2024), Canadian geologist
- Ray Price (rugby) (born 1953), Australian rugby union and rugby league footballer of the 1970s and 1980s
- Ray Price (motorcyclist) (1937–2015) motorcycle drag racer, designer and engineer
- Ray Price (cricketer) (born 1976), Zimbabwean cricketer
- Ray Price (footballer) (1944–1990), English footballer
