= Alfred Price (cricketer) =

English cricketer

Alfred Price (5 January 1862 – 21 March 1942) was an English cricketer active from 1884 to 1887 who played for Lancashire and Nottinghamshire. He was born in Ruddington and died in Oldham.

He appeared in seven first-class matches as a righthanded batsman, scoring 110 runs with a highest score of 37 and held seven catches.

== Personal life ==
His father was the Nottinghamshire player and umpire, Walter Price. His brother was cricketer William Price.
