= Daniel Buckner Price =

American artist

Daniel Price (1975-2003) was a successful New Orleans-born artist working and living in San Francisco, California. He was murdered while protecting his wife late at night on December 19, 2003.

== Early life and education ==
Daniel Buckner Price was born on February 25, 1975, to Dr. Steve and Mrs. Kathy Price of New Orleans. Price was raised in New Orleans with his three siblings and graduated from Benjamin Franklin High School (New Orleans). While in high school from 1989 to 1993, he also attended New Orleans Center for Creative Arts (NOCCA). Price then attended Southern Methodist University in Dallas, Texas where he received a Bachelor or Fine Arts degree from SMU's Meadows School of Fine Arts in 1998. He married his high school classmate, Sarah Abbott, in 2002.

Price spent time working on his art all over the world. He was pursuing his art career from an early age, first while at NOCCA and as a teen apprentice for a well known local New Orleans artist Luis Colmenares, as an editorial cartoonist for The Daily Campus (SMU), while studying in the Loire Valley of France, and while working in Rio de Janeiro, Brazil and ending the five-and-a-half-years after his college graduation as an artist in San Francisco.

== Art ==
Price's wife wrote, “His vibrant paintings hang in bars, restaurants, mansions, castles, and studio apartments around the world.”

In an interview with Dr. Price, Price’s father, he said, "Daniel was an artist from the time he was a baby, so I guess it was in his soul. He just loved to create and depict what he thought was beautiful. He was always inspired by the music and culture of New Orleans and tried to reflect that through art. And he loved to make people laugh; a lot of his art is very funny."

During his years studying at SMU, Price was an editorial cartoonist for the school newspaper, The Daily Campus. In 1997, his cartoons earned him the Best Cartoonist Award from the College Media Advisors Student Award Program, which reviews college newspapers nationwide.

After graduating, Price moved to San Francisco and joined Mural Arts, a company where he was commissioned to paint murals in various places around the world. These murals are now in Las Vegas, Lake Tahoe, Nevada, Hawaii, Normandy, France, as well as multiple murals in New Orleans.

His memorial fund echoes his success, stating, "In addition to his regularly-commissioned portraits of people and dogs, Daniel's murals and paintings grace the walls of multiple restaurants in the two cities, as well as historic homes and the grand ballroom of Harrah's Casino (Harrah's New Orleans)”.

At the time of Price's death, his art was appearing in a solo show at Canvas Gallery on 1200 Ninth Ave in San Francisco and in a permanent collection at The Fly, a bar also in San Francisco at 762 Divisadero St.

The Canvas Gallery, where Price had his first solo San Francisco show in November 2003 says this about his work:

"Daniel Price's paintings and portraits combine vibrant color, dramatic composition, and energetic brushwork to create a sense of emotional intensity. Drawing inspiration from the culture of his hometown of New Orleans, Daniel's work is filled with musicality and passion. Having come of age in a place where life is seen as a continual celebration, Daniel celebrates the everyday in his imagery of his studio, streets scenes and his portraits of people and animals. With a firm understanding of traditional painting, Daniel uses his skills to create images that pay homage to painters of the past yet still feel very contemporary. In his portraiture, Daniel is not concerned so much with creating a likeness as with capturing the dynamic between the artist and the sitter. When the sitter is a dog - the resulting paintings are strange mix of drama and humor.

In his series of five paintings depicting Mardi Gras Indians, Daniel captures the vibrancy and drama of the costumes and people at the heart of a unique New Orleans tradition. Mardi Gras Indians are a society of social organizations comprised, in large part, of the African-Americans of New Orleans' inner cities. They have paraded for over a century in groups formed as imaginary Indian tribes and named according to the streets of their neighborhood. The Mardi Gras Indians modeled themselves after Native Americans to pay them respect for their assistance in escaping the tyranny of slavery. It is now a tradition and practice for the Mardi Gras Indians to compare their tribal song, dance and dress with other tribes as they meet on Mardi Gras day. Each Indian has invested thousands of hours and dollars in the creation of his suit, and on Mardi Gras morning, as well as St. Josephs day, the Indian tribes meet to parade. Daniel's brushwork and rich palette reflect the energy of the experience."

People speak to the vibrancy of Price's artwork by way of speaking to the type of person Price was.

"People loved his artwork. But to say he was a great artist does not even begin to touch on what a beautiful person he was," says bartender Pete Krafchik at The Fly in San Francisco.

"Words will never do his uniquely joyful and creative spirit justice. Daniel expressed (love) to all those around him, the happiness and excitement he felt throughout his life, the joy he received from sharing his creations with others, the celebration that was constantly taking place around him by the sheer force of his exuberant spirit, the music of New Orleans that was constantly playing in his heart," according to the Daniel Price Memorial Fund.

"Family, friends, and strangers alike remember Daniel for his infectious spirit and creativity. An inspiration to all whose lives he touched, Daniel had the ability to find beauty in even the simplest pleasures," said Hon. Cedric Richmond in the House of Representatives in December 2011.

"Daniel delighted in pointing out beauty and irony in life. If beauty can be found in his death, it is that he lived as if he could die at any moment; he delayed neither pleasure nor accomplishment, friendships nor love. In the spirit of his hometown [of New Orleans], Daniel loved to say he lived life from celebration to celebration. He could celebrate anything. A walk down a tree-lined street. A simple lunch. The way sunlight flooded his art studio in the morning. Small pleasures that people around him took for granted until his example reminded him that they shouldn't...Daniel celebrated everyday moments in his paintings, drawings, murals, and sculptures, and he made each of those images burst with the same radiance he exuded in his own life. Daniel's fascination with New Orleans' themes and traditions continued to dominate his art," states the WWOZ New Orleans Jazz and Heritage Station 2005 Commemorative Calendar.

== Death ==
Shortly past midnight on December 19, 2003, Price was murdered for an unknown reason by an unknown perpetrator. Price and his wife, Sarah Abbott Price, were returning from a holiday party to their Cow Hollow (Neighborhoods in San Francisco), San Francisco apartment. Sarah was returning home and Price was planning on continuing to use the taxi to go to another gathering. Price was still in the taxi when he saw a man approach Sarah as she was going inside the building. Price then went to help his wife get inside safely when the stranger took out a gun and shot Price in the head at a close range. Price was pronounced dead shortly after at San Francisco General Hospital. It is suspected that the killer could have been a man that attempted a limousine hijacking in the neighborhood earlier in the evening, but when his attempt failed he fled on foot. After he killed Price, he immediately ran away and his identity is still unknown. Price's killer was featured on the America's Most Wanted television show. With there being few witnesses at the scene, the police attempted to use the taxi cab camera footage but were unsuccessful in identifying the killer. They have made multiple sketches but none have proven successful. No attempts at robbery were made on Daniel and Sarah's purse was not grabbed at, the killer only requested entry into the apartment building.

== Daniel Price Memorial Fund for Aspiring Artists ==
A year after Price's death, local New Orleans parents Dr. and Mrs. Kathy Price created a memorial fund in honor of their talented son. The memorial fund explains:

The Daniel Price Memorial Fund for Aspiring Artists was established to give exceptional fine arts graduates of NOCCA an opportunity to pursue higher educational studies in a fine arts discipline. The scholarship will enable future generations of young, talented artists like Daniel Price to follow their artistic passion while obtaining a college degree. All college-bound seniors with a fine arts concentration are invited to apply for the scholarship during their final year at NOCCA. Qualified candidates will exhibit strong interpersonal skills and a desire to pursue a fine arts career, with plans to attend college in the fall following their graduation from NOCCA. Applicants must also demonstrate an ongoing commitment to the New Orleans artistic community.The Fund's scholarship is a one-time grant to be awarded annually to the outstanding NOCCA senior who best meets the above criteria. The amount of the scholarship will be determined on a yearly basis, always equaling the amount of interest earned on the total value of the Daniel Price Memorial Fund for Aspiring Artists.

=== Home for the Holidays ===
Home for the Holidays is a benefit concert that was organized by NOCCA and the Price Family in order to further fundraise for the Daniel Price Memorial Fund. In 2012, the ninth concert was held, bringing in some of New Orleans’ best talent to pay their respects to Price and to support the memorial fund. House of Blues New Orleans holds the well-attended and successful annual event.

"The event, which has become a spectacular night combining art, music and philanthropy, honors Price’s memory and raises funds for the students who will carry on his spirit through their own artistic endeavors," according to New Orleans' St. Charles Avenue magazine.
