= Susan Price (disambiguation) =

Susan Price (born 1955) is an English author of children's and young adult novels.

Susan Price is also the name of:

- Susan Price (linguist) (born 1956), English linguist and university administrator
- Susan Price (book collector) (born 1960), New Zealand writer and children's book collector

== See also ==
- Sue Price (born 1965), American professional bodybuilder and actress
