= William Price (Liverpool and District cricketer) =

English cricketer

Personal information
- Born: 4 December 1859; Ruddington, Nottinghamshire, England
- Died: Unknown
- Relatives: Walter Price (father); Alfred Price (brother)

Career statistics
Competition	First-class
Matches	2
Runs scored	28
Batting average	14.00
100s/50s	0/0
Top score	26*
Balls bowled	551
Wickets	10
Bowling average	11.30
5 wickets in innings	1
10 wickets in match	0
Best bowling	6/51
Catches/stumpings	1/–
- Source: Cricinfo, 8 November 2022

William Harry Price (born 4 December 1859) was an English cricketer who played two first-class matches for Liverpool and District in 1889. He was born in Ruddington, Nottinghamshire.

Both his games were at Aigburth in Liverpool. In the first, against Yorkshire, he made 26* and 1* and took 3–52 (including the wicket of George Ulyett) in an innings defeat. In the second, against Nottinghamshire, he made only 0 and 1 with the bat, but took 6–51 in the first innings and a further wicket in the second despite Nottinghamshire's nine-wicket victory.

Three of Price's relatives played first-class cricket: his father Walter appeared more than 30 times for a variety of teams, most notably Marylebone Cricket Club (MCC) and Nottinghamshire, while his brother Alfred played briefly for Lancashire and Nottinghamshire, and another brother (Frederick) had a solitary outing for North of England.
