= Christopher Price =

Christopher Price may refer to:

- Christopher Price (broadcaster) (1967–2002), British radio and television broadcaster
- Christopher Price (politician) (1932–2015), British Labour Party Member of Parliament
- Christopher D. Price (born 1976), American conservative Baptist pastor, theologian, and writer
- Chris Price (footballer) (born 1960), English footballer
- Chris Price (musician) (born 1984), American musician, record producer and songwriter
- Chris Price (poet) (born 1962), New Zealand poet, editor and creative writing teacher
