= Karen Price (disambiguation) =

Karen Price is an American model, stunt actress and television producer.

Karen Price may refer to:

- Karen Price (cricketer) (born 1955), Australian cricketer
- Karen Price (murder victim)
- Karen Price, character played by Faith Ford
