= Joseph Price House =

Historic house in Pennsylvania, United States

- U.S. National Register of Historic Places
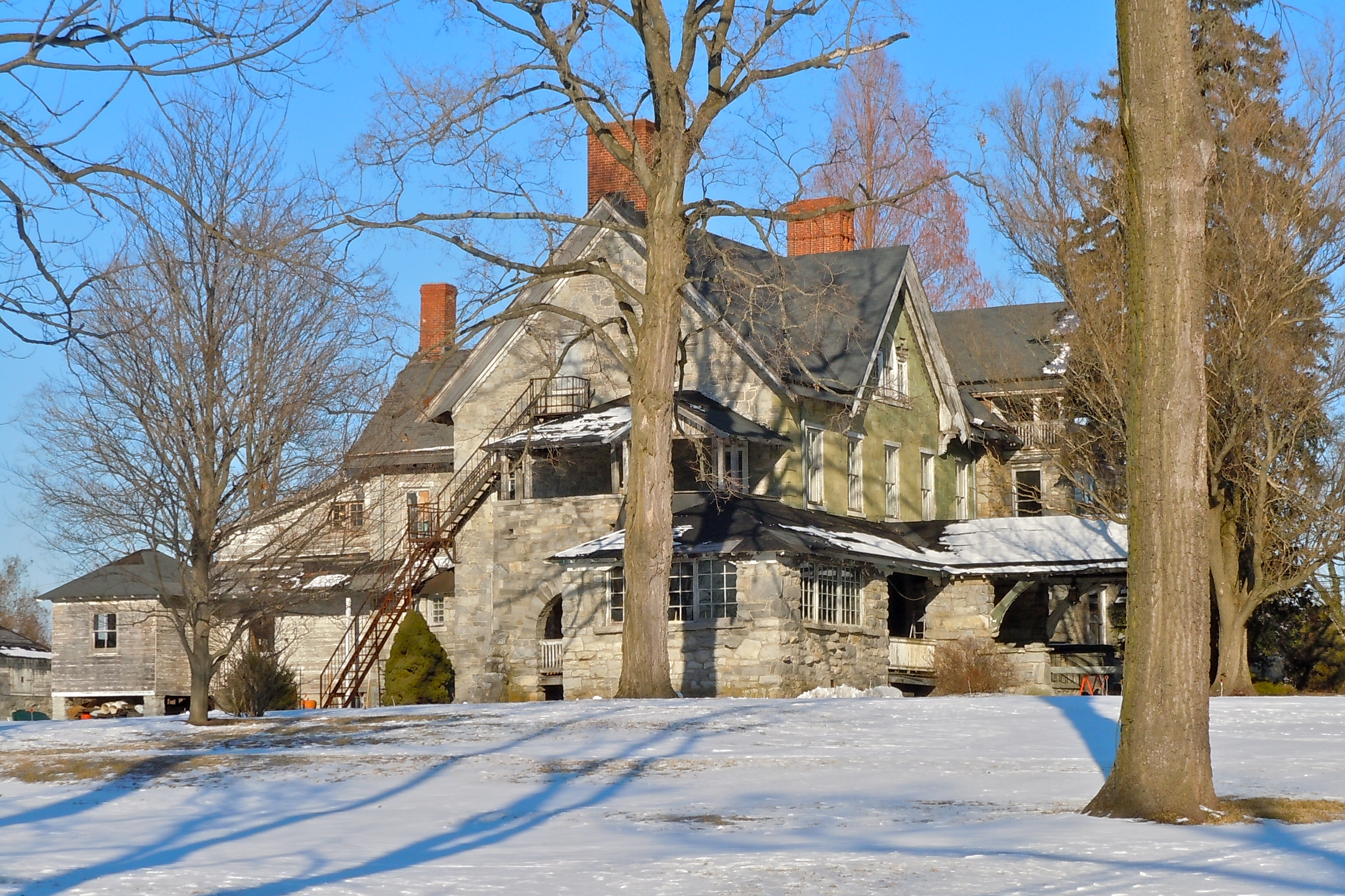
- Joseph Price House, January 2011

- Location within Pennsylvania Location within the United States
- Location: 401 Clover Mill Rd., West Whiteland Township, Pennsylvania
- Coordinates: 40°1′4″N 75°38′27″W
- Area: 3.6 acres (1.5 ha)
- Built: 1878, c. 1894
- Architectural style: Gothic, Queen Anne, Rural Gothic
- MPS: West Whiteland Township MRA
- NRHP reference No.: 84003299
- Added to NRHP: September 6, 1984

Joseph Price House is a historic home located in West Whiteland Township, Chester County, Pennsylvania. The house was built in 1878, and altered after 1894. The original house was a two-story, L-shaped limestone dwelling with a steeply pitched roof and cross gable. Later alterations added a rambling addition, porte cochere, and full length porch. It is in a Queen Anne / Gothic style.

It was listed on the National Register of Historic Places in 1984.
