= Byron Price (Arkansas politician) =

American politician (c. 1853–1908)

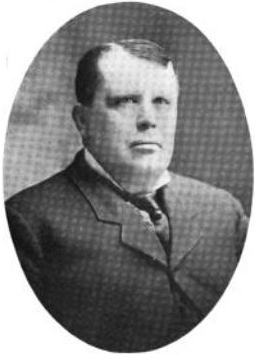
Byron Price, 1902

Byron Price (c. 1850s – October 16, 1908) was an American politician. He was a Democratic member of the Arkansas Senate for two terms.

== Life and career ==
Price was born in c. 1853 – c. 1859, in either Purdy, Tennessee, or Arkansas County, Arkansas. Some sources state he moved to Arkansas County in his youth, settling in Stuttgart, Arkansas, in 1868.

After securing a comfortable win in the primary, Price faced no opponent in the general election and was elected to the Arkansas Senate in 1900. He represented Arkansas County and Monroe County in the Senate, serving in the 33rd and 34th General Assemblies. In 1901, he introduced a bill for an Arkansas exhibit at the St. Louis World's Fair. In 1902, he introduced a bill to secure appropriations for Confederate monuments.

He died on October 16, 1908, at his home in Stuttgart after a long illness. He was buried in Saint Charles Cemetery in Saint Charles, Arkansas County, Arkansas.
