= John Playfair Price =

British diplomat (1905–1988)

John Playfair Price (4 July 1905 – 5 May 1988) was a British diplomat, and a former President of the Oxford Union.

== Early life ==
The son of William Arthur Price by his marriage to Edith Octavia Playfair, Price was educated at Gresham's School and New College, Oxford, where he was an Honorary Exhibitioner and President of the Oxford Union Society.

== Career ==
After Oxford, Price joined the Diplomatic service and held Consular posts at Beijing, Nanjing, Tianjin, Guangzhou, Zhenjiang, Harbin in Manchuria, Kathmandu, Gangtok in Sikkim, Los Angeles, Kansas City, Tunis, Tangier, Lisbon, Santiago de Chile, and Geneva.

He was first appointed a Vice-Consul in 1930. During 1938, he was posted back to London for a tour of duty at the Foreign Office, and in 1940 was sent to Lisbon as Vice-Consul. In 1942, on his arrival in Kansas City, Price took two hours to complete Missouri's forms to obtain a driver's license, before revealing that he intended to live on Mission Woods Road, in the state of Kansas.

After the Second World War he was Consul-General for Khorasan, Sistan and Persian Baluchistan, to where he was appointed in 1948. He retired from the Diplomatic Service in 1950.

In 1932, he married Alice Elizabeth Kendall, of Boston, Mass., and they had two daughters. At the time of his death in 1988, his address was in Thonon, France.

== Appointments ==
- Member of Civil Service and Foreign Service Selection and Final Selection Boards, 1950
- Director and Chairman of Executive, Central African Rhodes Centenary Exhibition, 1951–52
- Member of British Council, 1959–1961
