= Jack Price (darts) =

British darts referee (1928–2006)

- Born: William John; 20 October 1928; Bristol, England
- Died: 23 February 2006 (aged 77)
- Occupation: Darts referee

Jack Price (20 October 1928 – 23 February 2006) was a British darts referee. He was the British Darts Organisation's top referee and master of ceremonies, seen frequently on television throughout the 1970s until the mid-1980s.

Price died on 23 February 2006, at the age of 77.
