= Ernest Price =

Ernest Price may refer to:

- Ernest B. Price (1890–1973), American diplomat, university professor, military officer and businessman
- Jack Dillon (Ernest Cutler Price, 1891–1942), world light heavyweight boxing champion
- Ernest Griffith Price (1870–1962), British politician
- Ernie Price (1950–2004), American football player
- Ernie Price (English footballer) (1926–2013), English footballer and football manager
- Ernest V. Price (1884–1974), American architect
- Ernest W. Price (1907–1990), British surgeon, discovered the etiology of podoconiosis

== Fictional ==
- Ernie Price, the subject of the song Ernie (The Fastest Milkman in the West), sung by Benny Hill

== See also ==
- Price (surname)
