= Sarah Price =

Sarah Price may refer to:

- Sarah Price (swimmer) (born 1979), English backstroke swimmer
- Sarah Price (filmmaker), American filmmaker
- Sarah Price (author), Christian fiction novelist
- Sarah Frances Price (1849–1903), American botanist
- Sally Price (chemist) (Sarah Lois Price), professor of physical chemistry

== See also ==
- Sara Price (born 1992), American driver
