= Charles Price (swindler) =

English counterfeiter and confidence trickster (d. 1787)

Charles Price (Old Patch)
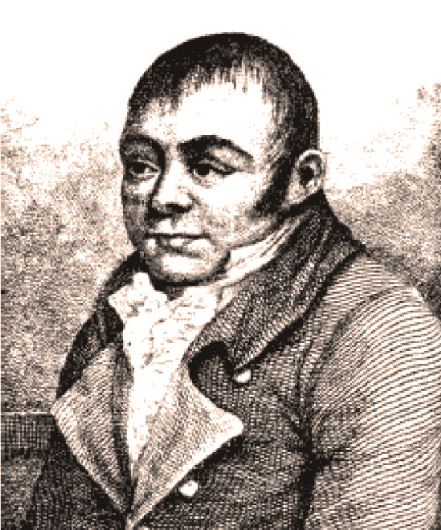
- Died: 1787; London, England
- Resting place: Tothill Fields
- Occupation: Swindler
- Known for: Counterfeiting

Charles Price in The Chronicles of Newgate, ed. Arthur Griffiths

Charles Price (died 1787), otherwise Old Patch, was a prolific English forger and swindler. He was said to have made a total of £200,000 by his swindles across his career.

== Career ==
=== Early career, first legal trouble ===
Price began his career when seventeen years old, covering his deceit within the occupations of "comedian, brewer, lottery-office keeper, stockbroker, gambler and forger." He later turned to the Bank of England as the focus of a counterfeit scheme. His swindles included a confidence trick on an actor called Foote, persuading him into a partnership in a brewery, then absconding with the profits, leaving Foote with liabilities of £500. On setting up an illicit still he was arrested and sent to Newgate Prison until he paid a fine of £1,600; he was released through the intercession Lord Littleton and Foote, and forgiven the fine. He next became a fraudulent lottery office keeper, and disappeared with funds from a "big prize."

=== Lifestyle and techniques ===
Price lived at three houses: one with his wife; another under a different name and with his mistress who aided his schemes; and a third as a centre for passing counterfeits. Throughout this subterfuge he invented different names and wore different disguises for each part of the scheme. Under his real name he was a middle-aged man "inclined to stoutness, erect, active and not bad looking, with a beaky nose, keen grey eyes, and a nutcracker chin." In one of his swindles he, as one persona, 'exposed' to a city merchant another of his personas who had swindled the merchant; this second persona offered to buy-off the merchant for £500 which was agreed to. The merchant was bought-off with a fake £1,000 note, he giving £500 back in change. As a disguised 'old man', he paid a grocer with a forged £50 note, and when the bank refused to honour the forgery, Price, as himself, supported the grocer in his action against the bank.

Working in secret, he produced his own plates, paper, ink, and watermarking devices, and expertly copied cashiers' signatures. His first bank notes were such effective imitations that they were paid without concern. Suspicion was aroused after subsequent inspection during lottery draws found them forgeries, however evidence of the counterfeits at the time were only within these lotteries. The directors of the Bank of England advertised in newspapers offering rewards, and employed detectives to find the forger, or what they believed was a well organized large gang.

=== Mr Brank ===
Price had adopted the name of Mr. Brank and advertised for a manservant. A boy answered the advertisement whereby Price met him by carriage. The boy described Price as a "foreigner, sixty or seventy years old, apparently troubled with gout, as some yards of flannel were wrapped around his legs. A camel hair overcoat was buttoned round his mouth; a large patch placed over his left eye; and nearly every part of his face was concealed." From this eyepatch his sobriquet became 'Old Patch.' After further interviews 'Mr. Brank' engaged the boy, dressed him in livery, with a principal duty of buying lottery office tickets for Brank's "whimsical" ward. He began by giving the boy, and other accomplices, £20 and £40 counterfeit banknotes, and others up to the value of £400, while he waited in his coach for the lottery tickets and the change he received from buying them with high denomination fake notes. The boy was later arrested and sent to prison, while imploring his innocence. However, the forged notes still circulated and the Bank's directors realized they were mistaken and had the boy released with a gift of £20. A plan was then laid to arrest Mr. Brank, who managed to evade the police.

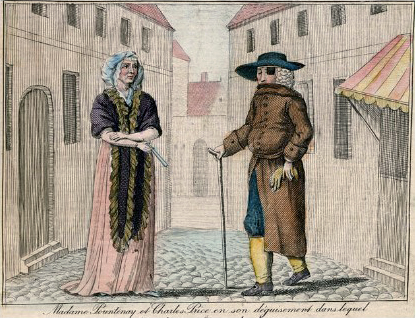
Charles Price as 'Old Patch' with Mrs. Poultney

=== Tellers ticket scheme ===
In 1780 Price devised a new scheme. He deposited a £10 note into the Bank and received a teller's ticket in return; this negotiable receipt could be handed back to the Bank to receive the £10 deposited. Price altered tickets to read £100, an amount he received on presentation; the bank tellers would not see the shortfall until an end-of-day cash-up. Losses amounted up to £1,000.

== Arrest and suicide ==
As 'Old Patch', Price was now sought by Bow Street Runners, who released reports describing his various disguises, including the eye patch and wide brimmed slouch hat. His female accomplice was later revealed as a Mrs. Poultney, who was his wife's aunt, described as a "tall, rather genteel woman of thirty, with a downcast look, thin face and person, light hair, and pitted with the small-pox." Mrs. Poultney went under the alias of Hickeringill. One forged note had been traced to a pawnbroker who remembered it being passed by a man called Powel. The Runners assumed that Powel was an associate of Old Patch. They set up a watch on the pawnbrokers and Powel was arrested and identified as Price, who had on him a large number of notes and white tissue paper. Price claimed he had bought the paper to make air-balloons for his children. He was committed to the prison of Tothill Fields Bridewell while further inquiries were made. When in Tothill Fields he sent a clandestine letter to Mrs. Poultney asking her to "destroy everything." She burnt all Price's disguises in a kitchen fire with the excuse that they were infected by the plague. Remains of Price's counterfeiting equipment were found on a neighbouring dust heap even though Mrs. Poultney had disposed of the engraving press, water-mark wires, and the smashed copper plates. Although Price tried to deny his identity, evidence was against him. He was found hanging from hat screws on the door of his cell; his death was judged suicide and "according to the old custom the body was buried at midnight in a lonely cross-road grave" at Tothill Fields.

Price's swindles amounted to £200,000. He lived obscurely and never gambled or drank, so how the ill-gotten gains were disposed of "remained an inscrutable secret to the last."
