= Cecil Price (priest) =

Irish priest (1925–1997)

Cecil Johnston Price (1925–1997) was an Irish Anglican priest.

Price was educated at Trinity College, Dublin. He was ordained deacon in 1950 and priest in 1951. After Curacies in Tralee and Cork he held incumbencies at Desertserges, Limerick, Bandon and Delgany. He was Archdeacon of Glendalough from 1989 to 1994.
