= Larry Price =

Larry Price may refer to:

- Larry Price (Hawaii radio personality) (1935–2026), American athlete, media personality and journalist
- Larry Price (politician), former member of the Ohio House of Representatives
- Larry C. Price (born 1954), United States photojournalist
- Larry Price, a character in Alias Nick Beal

== See also ==
- Lawrence Price (disambiguation)
