= Paul Price =

Paul Price may refer to:

- Paul Price (American football), American football coach in the United States
- Paul Price (basketball) (c. 1913–?), American professional basketball player
- Paul Price (footballer) (born 1954), former English footballer
- Paul Price (squash player) (born 1976), squash player from Australia
- P. Buford Price (1932–2021), American nuclear physicist
- Paul Price (musician) (1921–1986), American percussionist, educator and composer

== See also ==
- Paul Preiss (born 1980), American actor
