= Benjamin Price =

Benjamin Price may refer to:

- Benjamin Price (cricketer) (born 1981)
- Benjamin D. Price (1845–1922), architect
- Benjamin Price (bishop) (1804–1896), first bishop of the Free Church of England
- Benjamin Price (merchant) in Province of Quebec
- Ben Price (journalist) on List of George Polk Award winners
- Ben Price (born 1972), British actor

== Characters ==
- Benjamin Price, character in Ravenswood
- Benjamin Price, Law&Order character played by Graham Patrick Martin
