= Brian Price =

Brian Price may refer to:

- Brian Price (rowing) (born 1976), Canadian coxswain
- Brian Price (rugby union) (1937–2023), Welsh rugby union international
- Brian Price (American football, born 1989), American football defensive tackle
- Brian Price (American football, born 1994), American football defensive tackle
- Brian David Price, American screenwriter and screenwriting teacher
- Brian R. Price, American author, editor, armorer, and publisher
- Bryan Price (born 1962), American former baseball manager of the Cincinnati Reds
- Bryan Price (pitcher) (born 1986), American baseball player
