= Terry L. Price =

American philosopher (born 1966)

Terry L. Price (born 27 December 1966) is an American philosopher.

Price studied psychology and philosophy at University of North Carolina at Chapel Hill, graduating in 1989. He then completed a master of arts in philosophy at the University of Arizona in 1994. His studies in politics at the University of Oxford was funded by the John M. Olin Foundation. After Price obtained his M.Litt. in 1996, he returned to the University of Arizona to pursue a doctorate in philosophy. Price finished his Ph.D. in 1998, under the supervision of Joel Feinberg. He later became the Coston Family Chair in Leadership and Ethics at the Jepson School of Leadership Studies within the University of Richmond.

== Selected publications ==
- Price, Terry L., Leadership Ethics: An Introduction (New York: Cambridge University Press, 2008).
- Price, Terry L., Understanding Ethical Failures in Leadership, Cambridge University Press, 2006
