= Alex Price (disambiguation) =

Alex Price (born 1985) is a British actor.

Alex Price may also refer to:

- Alex Price (cricketer) (born 1995), Australian cricketer
- Alex Price (musician) (born 1980), Canadian musician
- Alex Price, character in American Werewolf in London
