= Walter Price (cricketer and umpire) =

English cricketer and umpire

Personal information
- Born: 9 October 1834; Ruddington, Nottinghamshire, England
- Died: 4 September 1894 (aged 59)
- Batting: Left-handed
- Bowling: Left-arm medium
- Relatives: Alfred Price (son); Frederick Price (son); William Price (son)

Career statistics
Competition	First-class
Matches	33
Runs scored	625
Batting average	12.25
100s/50s	0/1
Top score	57
Balls bowled	825
Wickets	15
Bowling average	20.06
5 wickets in innings	1
10 wickets in match	0
Best bowling	5/66
Catches/stumpings	1/–
- Source: CricketArchive, 10 October 2022

Walter Price (9 October 1834 – 4 September 1894) was an English cricketer and umpire who played 33 first-class games between 1868 and 1882. Most of his matches were for Marylebone Cricket Club (MCC), but he also appeared five times in county cricket for Nottinghamshire, as well as appearing for the Players in both Gentlemen v Players games in 1870. As an umpire, Price stood on 72 occasions, mostly at Lord's, from 1865 to 1893.

He made his only half-century, 57, for Nottinghamshire against Surrey at The Oval in July 1869, while his only five-wicket innings haul, 5/88, was achieved for MCC against Gloucestershire at Lord's in August 1870.

Price was born in Ruddington, Nottinghamshire, and died there at the age of 59.

Three sons had brief first-class careers. Alfred Price played seven matches, including one for Lancashire and three for Nottinghamshire; Frederick Price had one game for North of England; and William Price turned out twice for Liverpool and District.
