= Henry Price =

Henry Price may refer to:

- Henry Bertram Price (1869–1941), Governor of Guam
- Henry Price (architect) (1867–1944), British architect
- Henry Price (painter) (1819–1863), British painter and musician
- Henry Price (politician) (1911–1982), British company director and politician
- Sir Henry Price, 1st Baronet (1877–1963), businessman in Yorkshire, England
- Henry Price (tenor) (born 1945), American opera singer
- H. H. Price (1899–1984), Welsh philosopher
- Henry Price (priest) (died 1706), Irish Anglican priest
- Henry James Price (1919–1989), Canadian politician
- Henry Strong Price (1825–1889), pioneer sheep pastoralist of South Australia
- Henry H. "Hank" Price (1915–2002), American politician, mayor of West Valley City, Utah
- Henry Isaac Price, Canadian politician

== See also ==
- Harry Price (disambiguation)
