= James Price =

James Price may refer to:

== Politics ==
- James Hervey Price (1797–1882), Canadian attorney and political figure
- James Hubert Price (1878–1943), American politician and governor
- James Latimer Price (1840–1912), American Republican politician and judge in the U.S. state of Ohio
- James Price (Australian politician) (1864–1910), Australian politician
- James Price (of Monachty) (1571–?), Welsh MP
- James Price (of Pilleth) (1571–1641), Welsh MP

== Sports ==
- James Price (cricketer) (born 1992), South African cricketer
- James Price (footballer) (1896–1970), Scottish footballer who played as a defender
- Jamie Price (born 1981), English footballer
- James R. Price (1862–1929), American sports journalist and executive

== Other ==
- James Price (businessman) (1776–1840), American businessman in the U.S. state of Delaware
- James Price (civil engineer) (1917–2005), Welsh civil engineer, mathematician and author
- James Price (chemist) (1752–1783), English chemist and alchemist
- James Price (composer) (born 1959), Danish composer and conductor
- James F. Price (1906–1994), American academic
- James H. Price (academic), American academic
- James Price (art director), British art director and production designer

== Places ==
- James Price Point, in Western Australia

== See also ==
- Jim Price (disambiguation)
