= Leo Price =

England international rugby union player, sportsman and schoolmaster

- Born: Herbert Leo Price; 21 June 1899 Sutton, Surrey, England
- Died: 18 July 1943 (aged 44) Victoria Park, Lancashire, England

Rugby union career
- Position: Flanker
Senior career
Years	Team	Apps	(Points)
1922-1924	Leicester Tigers	17	
International career
Years	Team	Apps	(Points)
1922-1923	England	4	(6)

Herbert Leo Price (21 June 1899 – 18 July 1943) was a sportsman and schoolmaster. He achieved the unusual feat of playing rugby and hockey for England on consecutive Saturdays. He also played first-class cricket with Oxford University and club rugby for Leicester Tigers and Harlequins.

In rugby, Price, a flanker, won his first two international caps for England in the 1922 Five Nations Championship with appearances against Ireland and Scotland. In the Championship the following year, Price helped his country to claim the Grand Slam and scored tries when England played Wales and Ireland. Price played 17 games for Leicester Tigers between 1922 and 1927, and though injury disrupted his career he continued playing for the Harlequins until 1932.

The sportsman played two first-class cricket matches during the 1920s, both for Oxford University. He debuted against the Army in 1920, opening the batting and made 14 followed by a duck (zero). His performance in his next match, against Middlesex in 1922, was little better; and he again scored a duck opening the batting but improved in the second innings with 32 not out. His elder brother Vincent, also an outstanding athlete at Oxford, played beside him in the Middlesex match. After Oxford, Price played for the Free Foresters.

On leaving school he had joined the Artists Rifles but was commissioned too late to see active service. He then went up to Corpus Christi College, Oxford, with a mathematics exhibition and graduated with honours in 1922.

Price was an all-round sportsman at Oxford, winning a Blue for rugby in 1921 and 1922, a half-blue for hockey in 1920, 1921 and 1922, and a half-blue for water polo in the four years from 1919 to 1922. He was also capped by the Harlequins, the Oxford University wandering cricket club.

After coming down he became a schoolmaster at Uppingham School for two years, and then at Christ's Hospital where he was a junior and then a senior housemaster. In 1932 he became headmaster of Bishop's Stortford College where he himself had been a pupil.

He was headmaster until his death after an operation, aged 44.
