= Rose Price =

Rose Price may refer to:

- Sir Rose Price, 1st Baronet (1768–1834) of the Price baronets, Sheriff of Cornwall, 1814
- Sir Rose Lambart Price, 3rd Baronet (1837–1899) of the Price baronets
- Sir Rose Price, 4th Baronet (1878–1901) of the Price baronets
- Sir Rose Francis Price, 6th Baronet (1910–1979) of the Price baronets
