= Jack Price (Australian footballer) =

Australian rules footballer

Personal information
- Full name: John Frederick Price
- Born: 26 June 1901; Camberwell, Victoria
- Died: 27 June 1941 (aged 40); Syria
- Height: 170 cm (5 ft 7 in)

Playing career^{1}
Years	Club	Games (Goals)
1925	Hawthorn	10 (2)
1926–29	Camberwell (VFA)	41 (6)
Total		51 (8)
- ^{1} Playing statistics correct to the end of 1929.

John Frederick Price (26 June 1901 – 27 June 1941) was an Australian rules footballer who played with Hawthorn in the Victorian Football League (VFL).

== Family ==
The son of John Price, and Annie Price (née Hunt), John Frederick Price was born at Camberwell, Victoria on 26 June 1901.

He married Emslee Margaret Gladys Murdoch in 1921.

== Football ==
Originally playing with Carlton reserves, Price transferred to Hawthorn during the 1925 VFL season, making 10 appearances and scoring 2 goals.

He subsequently played with Camberwell in the Victorian Football Association (VFA) for four seasons.

== Military service ==
Price enlisted and served in the second AIF in the 2/2nd Pioneer Battalion (as did Max Wheeler).

== Death ==
He was killed in action in Syria on 27 June 1941. He has no known grave, and is commemorated at the Alamein Memorial in Egypt.

== See also ==
- List of Victorian Football League players who died on active service
- Syria–Lebanon Campaign
