= Mary Price Walls =

Mary Jean Price Walls was the first black applicant to Missouri State University in 1950. While her application was ignored at the time, Walls received an honorary degree from the university at the age of 78 in 2010.

== Early life ==
Walls was born in Nogo, now part of Strafford, Missouri, in 1932, and later moved to Springfield. She graduated from Lincoln High in 1950, where she was class salutatorian.

Walls applied to Southwest Missouri State College (now Missouri State University) soon after graduation; however, due to existing segregation at the time, she received no decision from the university. The Brown v. Board of Education case ruled segregation unconstitutional in 1954, but Walls had decided to focus on work and caring for her father rather than pursuing a degree.

== Recognition ==
While Walls never told her children about her application, in 2009 her son Terry found correspondence between Walls and former college administrators in the Missouri State University library while himself a student there. In July 2010, the university recognized Walls with its first honorary bachelor's degree. Missouri State dedicated the Mary Jean Price Walls Multicultural Resource Center Annex in Walls' name in 2016.

Walls died on July 6, 2020.
