= Christopher Gill (philosopher) =

British philosopher (born 1946)

- Born: 1946 (age 79–80)
- Occupation: Philosopher
- Awards: Runciman Prize (1997)

Philosophical work
- Era: 21st-century philosophy
- Region: Western philosophy
- Institutions: University of Exeter
- Main interests: ancient Greek philosophy

Christopher Gill (born 1946) is a British philosopher and Emeritus Professor of Ancient Thought at the University of Exeter. He is known for his works on ancient philosophy. His book Personality in Greek Epic, Tragedy, and Philosophy won the 1997 Runciman Prize. Gill served as the co-editor of Phronesis between 2003 and 2008.

== Books ==
- Personality in Greek Epic, Tragedy, and Philosophy: The Self in Dialogue (Oxford University Press, 1996)
- The Structured Self in Hellenistic and Roman Thought (Oxford University Press, 2006)
- Naturalistic Psychology in Galen and Stoicism (Oxford University Press, 2010)
- Marcus Aurelius Meditations Books 1-6, translated with an introduction and commentary (Oxford University Press, 2013)
- Learning to Live Naturally: Stoic Ethics and its Modern Significance (Oxford University Press, 2022)
