= 2003 English Greyhound Derby =

- Location: Wimbledon Stadium
- End date: 28 June
- Total prize money: £75,000 (winner)

The 2003 William Hill Greyhound Derby took place during May and June with the final being held on 28 June 2003 at Wimbledon Stadium.

The final resulted in the disqualification of Droopys Hewitt trained by Andy Iaonnou a first season trainer and former head man to Nick Savva. A sample taken by the stewards (the usual practice) in the third round was tested as positive and after a six-month court battle the National Greyhound Racing Club stewards finally prevailed and stripped the Derby title from Droopys Hewitt and awarded it to second place Farloe Verdict. The winner Farloe Verdict received £75,000.

== Final result ==
At Wimbledon (over 480 metres):

Position	Name of Greyhound	Breeding	Trap	Sectional	SP	Time	Trainer
1st	Farloe Verdict	Droopys Vieri - She Knew	2	4.99	12-1	29.12	Charlie Lister (Private)
2nd	Top Savings	Top Honcho - Too Breezy	6	5.02	4-7f	29.18	Charlie Lister (Private)
3rd	Farloe Pocket	Larkhill Jo - Tornaroy Tumble	4	5.00	33-1	29.18	Barrie Draper (Sheffield)
4th	Man of Cash	Cool Performance - Travelling Light	1	4.98	3-1	29.44	Patsy Byrne (Wimbledon)
5th	Larkhill Bullet	Staplers Jo - Annies Bullet	5	5.00	6-1	29.46	Charlie Lister (Private)
Disq	Droopys Hewitt	Top Honcho - Droopys Cheryl	3	4.93	16-1	00.00	Andy Iaonnou (Private)

=== Distances ===
¾, short head, 3¼, head (lengths)
The distances between the greyhounds are in finishing order and shown in lengths. One length is equal to 0.08 of one second.

== Competition report ==
Wimbledon Stadium underwent £70,000 track improvements following public criticism during and after the 2002 English Greyhound Derby.

The first round consisted of 34 heats and ante-post favourite Top Savings justified his odds by going fastest with a 28.40 win. Micks Mystic the Scottish Derby champion was a notable elimination. Top Savings was fastest again in round two on slower going recording 28.89 beating Larkhill Bullet. Farloe Verdict and Droopys Corleone remained unbeaten. Top Savings was denied a third successive fastest round time by stayer Maxie Rumble. The Prestige champion went ten spots faster in 28.79 sec. Droopys Corleone won again but Farloe Verdict lost his unbeaten record when finishing runner up to Top Savings with Larkhill Bullet in third.

In the quarter-final Man of Cash won his third successive race in a fast 28.53 from Farloe Verdict. Droopys Corleone won heat two before Droopys Hewitt defeated Top Savings in the third quarter. Larkhill Bullet claimed the fourth and final heat. In the first semi-final Top Savings beat Farloe Pocket and Droopys Hewitt in 28.64. Droopys Corleone and Maxie Rumble failed to make the final. Larkhill Bullet claimed the easier semi-final from Farloe Verdict and Man of Cash.

In the final Man of Cash was first to show but moved off allowing Droopys Hewitt inside at the first bend, kennelmates Larkhill Bullet and Top Savings clashed putting paid to their chances and first bend bunching left Droopys Hewitt clear to win. Farloe Verdict and Top Savings both ran on well. Droopys Hewitt was subsequently disqualified following a positive drugs test and stripped of the title and prize money.

== Quarter finals ==
Heat 1 (Jun 17)
Pos	Name	SP	Time
1st	Man of Cash	3-1	28.53
2nd	Farloe Verdict	5-2	29.03
3rd	Sound Sense	6-1	29.09
4th	Burberry Boy	9-4f	29.11
5th	Larkhill Lo	5-1	29.31
6th	Carrigeen Prince	25-1	29.51

Heat 2 (Jun 17)
Pos	Name	SP	Time
1st	Droopys Corleone	4-7f	28.89
2nd	Farloe Forty	6-1	29.03
3rd	Lenson Arsenal	9-2	29.05
4th	Talk the Talk	9-2	29.09
5th	Blonde Admiral	8-1	29.43
N/R	Coolavanny Euro		

Heat 3 (Jun 17)
Pos	Name	SP	Time
1st	Droopys Hewitt	4-1	28.81
2nd	Javelin King	12-1	29.15
3rd	Top Savings	4-7f	29.21
4th	Droopys Oasis	12-1	29.23
5th	Rhincrew Silver	7-1	29.37
6th	Lark in Flight	12-1	29.49

Heat 4 (Jun 17)
Pos	Name	SP	Time
1st	Larkhill Bullet	6-4jf	29.15
2nd	Farloe Pocket	14-1	29.17
3rd	Maxie Rumble	6-4jf	29.21
4th	Farloe Style	6-1	29.25
5th	Daleridge Prince	25-1	29.26
6th	Wee Bobby	6-1	29.29

== Semi finals ==
First Semi Final (Jun 21)
Pos	Name of Greyhound	SP	Time	Trainer
1st	Top Savings	4-5f	28.64	Lister
2nd	Farloe Pocket	16-1	29.22	Draper
3rd	Droopys Hewitt	7-1	29.50	Ioannou
4th	Droopys Corleone	3-1	29.52	Riordan
5th	Javelin King	33-1	29.70	Draper
6th	Maxie Rumble	5-1	29.71	Mullins J

Second Semi Final (Jun 21)
Pos	Name of Greyhound	SP	Time	Trainer
1st	Larkhill Bullet	9-4	28.96	Lister
2nd	Farloe Verdict	4-1	29.12	Lister
3rd	Man of Cash	11-10f	29.14	Byrne
4th	Farloe Forty	20-1	29.44	Lister
5th	Sound Sense	14-1	29.47	Draper
6th	Lenson Arsenal	20-1	29.59	Hitch

== See also ==
- 2003 UK & Ireland Greyhound Racing Year
