= 2003 UK & Ireland Greyhound Racing Year =

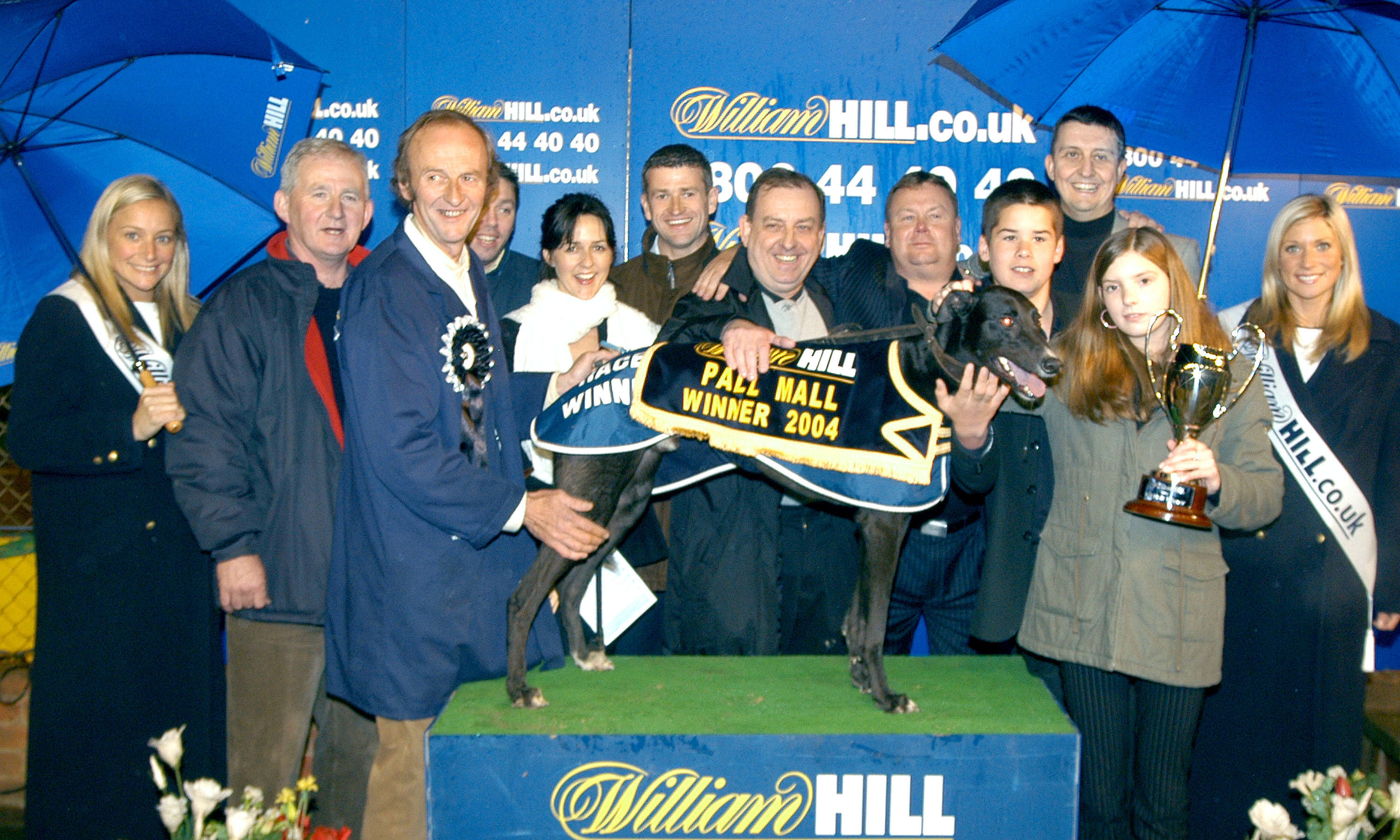
- Greyhound of the Year Tims Crow

The 2003 UK & Ireland Greyhound Racing Year was the 78th year of greyhound racing in the United Kingdom and the 77th year of greyhound racing in Ireland.

== Summary ==
The industry suffered a huge double blow with the closure of Catford and the English Greyhound Derby fiasco. Catford Stadium, owned by GRA was closed with little warning. The last meeting was on the 5 November leaving the staff, trainers and many others redundant.

Trainers John Simpson, Tony Taylor, Maxine Locke and John Walsh moved to Wimbledon, Keston based Steve Gammon left for Crayford, Sonja Spiers and Kevin Connor went to Sittingbourne and Mark Lavender switched to Portsmouth. Racing Manager Derek Hope was able to take up the same position at Wimbledon soon after because Simon Harris had left for Coventry Stadium bookmaker John Humphreys, who had stood in the main ring since 1966 and sponsored the Gold Collar for 18 years, retired.

The 2003 English Greyhound Derby took place as usual with the final being held on 28 June. The final resulted in the disqualification of Droopys Hewitt, trained by Andy Iaonnou a first season trainer and former head man to Nick Savva. A sample taken by the stewards (the usual practice) was tested as positive and following a six-month court battle the National Greyhound Racing Club stewards finally prevailed and stripped the Derby title from Droopys Hewitt and awarded it to second place Farloe Verdict. The winner Farloe Verdict received £75,000 and the disgraced Iaonnou was banned from the sport.

The 2003 Irish Greyhound Derby suffered no such troubles and was won by Climate Control.

Charlie Lister was Greyhound Trainer of the Year, it was the first time he had taken the honour despite all of his previous success. Brian Clemenson landed the trainers championship for the second successive year. The title of greyhound of the year went to Tims Crow.

=== Tracks ===
Dundalk officially opened their new Dundalk Stadium on 29 November 2003 to the cost of €11 million. The minister for sport John O'Donoghue conducted the opening.

William Hill bookmakers purchased Brough Park and it underwent major investment, similar to that of Sunderland, which William Hill had acquired the year before.

Auchinleck in East Ayrshire, a major independent (unlicensed track) closed after seventy years racing. The track was the birthplace of famous Scottish bookmaker Fearless Freddie Williams who had his first pitch there many years ago.

=== Competitions ===
Former Springbok champion Rossa Ranger set a new track record over 385 hurdles at Crayford recording a remarkable 23.36, faster than the flat heats of the Rosebowl on the same night. However he failed to make it past the Grand National first round. The event went to Selby Ben continuing Tommy Foster's success in the hurdle classic. Charlie Lister lifted the Scottish Greyhound Derby with new Irish acquisition Micks Mystic. Shelbourne Star lost his St Leger title after a positive test.

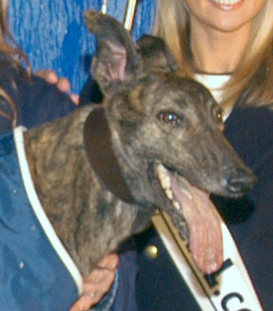
Shelbourne Star

=== News ===
There was continued debating on two issues; whether a levy should be paid to the sport in place of the Bookmakers contributions and how to increase funding in welfare to ensure that the industry could meet and exceed the requirements set by DEFRA and the Animal Welfare Bill.

Trainer Joe Cobbold died after a long battle with cancer aged 71, his son Trevor Cobbold had died nearly ten years previous with cancer; the Utopia kennels had produced countless champions under the 'Decoy' prefix.

== Roll of honour ==
Major Winners
Award	Name of Winner
2003 English Greyhound Derby	Farloe Verdict
2003 Irish Greyhound Derby	Climate Control
Greyhound Trainer of the Year	Charlie Lister
Greyhound of the Year	Tims Crow
Irish Dog and Bitch of the Year	Climate Control / Mustang Mega

Trainers Championship, Sittingbourne (May 4)
Pos	Name of Trainer	Points
1st	Brian Clemenson	56
2nd	Linda Jones	47
3rd	Paul Young	30
4th	Cheryl Miller	29
5th	Seamus Cahill	25
6th	John Mullins	21

=== Principal UK finals ===
William Hill Grand National, Wimbledon (Mar 18, 460mH, £7,500)
Pos	Name of Greyhound	Trainer	SP	Time	Trap
1st	Selby Ben	Tommy Foster	12-1	28.45	2
2nd	Take A Tonic	Paul Young	5-1	28.57	4
3rd	Shopitaly	Seamus Cahill	2-1f	28.59	1
4th	High Roller	Barry O’Sullivan	4-1	28.69	6
5th	Ultra Low	Norah McEllistrim	7-1	28.69	3
6th	Coogee Tel Boy	George Andreas	7-2	28.72	5

Regal Scottish Derby, Shawfield (Apr 5, 480m, £25,000)
Pos	Name of Greyhound	Trainer	SP	Time	Trap
1st	Micks Mystic	Charlie Lister	4-6f	29.07	5
2nd	Bomber Graham	Pat Rosney	12-1	29.47	3
3rd	Unassailable	Tommy Gentles	10-1	29.53	1
4th	Swift Star	Paul Young	8-1	29.83	6
5th	Sportsman	Linda Jones	5-1	29.97	4
6th	Stay Please	Janis Carmichael	10-1	30.31	2

Reading Masters, Reading (Jul 20, 465m, £20,000)
Pos	Name of Greyhound	Trainer	SP	Time	Trap
1st	Blonde Ranger	John Mullins	6-1	28.00	5
2nd	Haughty Ted	Dinky Luckhurst	9-4f	28.10	1
3rd	Iceman Merlin	Tony Lucas	5-2	28.22	6
4th	Shirl Tel Kel	George Andreas	14-1	28.30	3
5th	Farloe Hack	Barrie Draper	11-4	28.44	4
6th	Nightingale Babe	Liz Redpath	10-1	28.64	2

William Hill Cesarewitch, Oxford (Jul 22, 645m, £5,000)
Pos	Name of Greyhound	Trainer	SP	Time	Trap
1st	Maxie Rumble	John Mullins	1-1f	39.62	2
2nd	Creamery City	Nick Colton	25-1	39.72	3
3rd	Iceman Yank	Tony Lucas	9-2	39.73	6
4th	Creamery Euro	Nick Colton	6-4	39.82	1
5th	Jago Pride	Richard Jago	33-1	40.10	4
6th	Southlodge Rage	Nick Colton	16-1	40.21	5

Tote Gold Collar, Catford (Sep 18, 555m, £7,500)
Pos	Name of Greyhound	Trainer	SP	Time	Trap
1st	Toms Little Jo	Gary Baggs	3-1	34.56	3
2nd	Topmeup	Paul Garland	4-1	35.00	1
3rd	Wall of Tears	Claude Gardiner	2-1f	35.12	6
4th	Sympatico	Bernie Doyle	10-1	35.20	2
5th	Iceman Mork	Tony Lucas	33-1	35.36	5
6th	Master Card	John Coleman	3-1	35.46	4

Victor Chandler Grand Prix, Walthamstow (Oct 4, 640m, £10,000)
Pos	Name of Greyhound	Trainer	SP	Time	Trap
1st	Special Trick	Linda Jones	4-1	39.85	3
2nd	Bale Out	Jim Reynolds	5-2f	40.09	1
3rd	Little Sapphire	John Mullins	10-1	40.41	5
4th	Soviet Swinger	Ernie Gaskin Sr.	3-1	40.51	2
5th	Split the Score	John Mullins	5-1	40.59	4
6th	Ballyshane Snow	Gary Baggs	6-1	40.85	6

William Hill TV Trophy, Wimbledon (Oct 7, 872m, £6,000)
Pos	Name of Greyhound	Trainer	SP	Time	Trap
1st	Ericas Equity	Paul Young	6-4	54.62	3
2nd	Shelbourne Star	Brian Clemenson	7-1	54.66	1
3rd	Creamery Euro	Nick Colton	7-1	54.78	2
4th	Iceman Yank	Tony Lucas	1-1f	55.00	4
5th	Vigorous Brook	Linda Jones	16-1	55.03	5
N/R	Similar Colour	Ernie Gaskin Sr.			6

William Hill Laurels, Belle Vue (Oct 28, 465m, £8,000)
Pos	Name of Greyhound	Trainer	SP	Time	Trap
1st	Knockeevan Magic	Peter Rich	11-10f	28.25	1
2nd	Bally Kee	Charlie Lister	7-4	28.53	3
3rd	Bomber Graham	Pat Rosney	8-1	28.66	2
4th	Stuart Little	Graham Hutt	9-1	29.23	5
5th	Missy Elliot	Anthony McConnell	8-1	29.32	6
N/R	Burberry Boy	Charlie Lister			4

William Hill St Leger, Wimbledon (Nov 11, 668m, £13,000)
Pos	Name of Greyhound	Trainer	SP	Time	Trap
1st	Bite the Bullet	Wayne Brunt	20-1	41.38	2
2nd	Tullymurry Token	Martin Dowman	33-1	41.41	5
3rd	Double Take	Andy Heyes	16-1	41.46	4
4th	Special Trick	Linda Jones	2-1	41.53	3
N/R	Fortuna Phantom	Tony Lucas			6
disq+	Shelbourne Star	Brian Clemenson	4-7f	41.21	1

+ disqualified after winning the race following a positive drugs test

William Hill Oaks, Wimbledon (Dec 2, 480m, £6,000)
Pos	Name of Greyhound	Trainer	SP	Time	Trap
1st	Cooly Pantera	Brian Clemenson	11-8f	29.18	4
2nd	Droopys Natalie	Charlie Lister	6-1	29.24	6
3rd	Zodiac Supreme	Norah McEllistrim	6-1	29.32	5
4th	Duchess Keghtley	Graham Hutt	9-4	29.34	3
5th	Lizzie Larsson	John Mullins	10-1	29.40	2
6th	Whitefort Jackie	Terry Kibble	20-1	29.62	1

=== Principal Irish finals ===
Easter Cup Shelbourne (Apr 12, 525y, €50,000)
Pos	Name of Greyhound	SP	Time	Trap
1st	Mobhi Gamble	4-1	28.47	6
2nd	Clover Hare	9-10f	28.48	2
3rd	Borna Pilot	7-2	28.65	3
4th	Johnny Jump Up	20-1	29.07	4
5th	Ten Men	6-1	29.21	1
6th	Haliska Hilander	50-1	29.32	5

Red Mills Produce Clonmel (May 4, 525y, €30,000)
Pos	Name of Greyhound	SP	Time	Trap
1st	Clashduff Fun	2-1	28.79	6
2nd	Safari King	7-2	28.89	2
3rd	Land of Song	20-1	28.93	4
4th	Officer Joe	7-4f	29.21	1
5th	Dunloe Prince	3-1	29.42	3
N/R	Davran Chief			5

Ladbrokes 600 Shelbourne (May 10, 600y, €35,000)
Pos	Name of Greyhound	SP	Time	Trap
1st	The Other Master	4-1	32.81	3
2nd	Frisby Fassan	4-1	32.82	6
3rd	Odette	6-1	32.89	1
4th	Diego Glory	12-1	33.06	2
5th	Charlie Bird	6-1	33.80	4
6th	Kansil O Kee	7-4f	00.00	5

Kerry Agribusiness Irish St Leger Limerick (Jun 8, 550y, €35,000)
Pos	Name of Greyhound	SP	Time	Trap
1st	Mountleader Rolf	5-2	30.01	6
2nd	Nikita Billie	7-1	30.02	3
3rd	Nod Mac	6-4f	30.09	4
4th	Land of Song	20-1	30.44	5
5th	Balscadden Boy	2-1	30.51	1
N/R	Maryville Rumble			2

Sporting Press Oaks Shelbourne (Jul 19, 525y, €35,000)
Pos	Name of Greyhound	SP	Time	Trap
1st	Axle Grease	11-10f	28.64	4
2nd	Mustang Mega	3-1	28.66	1
3rd	One Yard	4-1	28.90	2
4th	Odette	20-1	29.25	3
5th	Longvalley Tina	14-1	29.36	6
6th	Alisons Pet	20-1	29.57	5

Boylesports Champion Stakes Shelbourne (Aug 2, 550y, €40,000)
Pos	Name of Greyhound	SP	Time	Trap
1st	World Class	16-1	29.72	2
2nd	Priceless Rebel	12-1	29.86	1
3rd	Bookie Burglar	12-1	30.35	3
4th	Magical Captain	16-1	30.36	6
5th	Serene Rumble	2-1	30.53	4
6th	Climate Control	1-1f	31.23	5

BCR Press/Droopys Vieri Puppy Derby Harolds Cross (Oct 10, 525y, €50,000)
Pos	Name of Greyhound	SP	Time	Trap
1st	Droopys Cahill	5-4f	28.55	2
2nd	Jack Spark	6-1	28.79	4
3rd	Side Cash	6-1	28.86	3
4th	Early Mist	4-1	28.88	5
5th	Ballymac Returns	4-1	28.95	6
6th	Bo Bo	12-1	29.06	1

Co-Op Superstores Laurels Cork (Oct 25, 525y, €35,000)
Pos	Name of Greyhound	SP	Time	Trap
1st	Nikita Billie	9-2	28.34	3
2nd	Droopys Ruud	2-1f	28.44	2
3rd	Droopys Oasis	7-2	28.65	5
4th	Fiery Lark	12-1	28.90	1
5th	Mustang Buster	7-2	28.91	4
6th	Oasis Rumble	14-1	29.19	6

== Totalisator returns ==
Extended content

The totalisator returns declared to the National Greyhound Racing Club for the year 2003 are listed below.

Stadium	Turnover £
Walthamstow	12,443,362
Wimbledon	8,339,296
Romford	7,809,747
Belle Vue	6,173,275
Brighton & Hove	5,545,416
Hall Green	5,167,047
Peterborough	4,715,084
Sheffield	4,291,468
Oxford	2,712,891
Crayford	2,649,075
Sunderland	2,417,402

Stadium	Turnover £
Perry Barr	2,067,766
Nottingham	2,052,803
Monmore	2,048,880
Catford	2,012,983
Yarmouth	1,977,638
Poole	1,806,475
Shawfield	1,805,827
Swindon	1,611,112
Milton Keynes	1,551,192
Sittingbourne	1,417,520
Portsmouth	1,404,526

Stadium	Turnover £
Brough Park	1,303,000
Reading	943,155
Kinsley	903,734
Stainforth	897,660
Harlow	879,097
Mildenhall	309,636
Henlow	164,288
Rye House	121,225
Hull (New Craven Park)	27,205
Hull (Boulevard)	23,680
