= 1965 English Greyhound Derby =

- Location: White City Stadium
- Start date: 12 June
- End date: 26 June
- Total prize money: £5,000 (winner)

The 1965 English Greyhound Derby took place during June with the final being held on 26 June 1965 at White City Stadium. The winner was Chittering Clapton and the winning owners, father and son, Victor Leah and Peter Leah received £5,000.

== Final result ==
At White City (over 525 yards):

Position	Name of Greyhound	Breeding	Trap	SP	Time	Trainer
1st	Chittering Clapton	Noted Crusader - Chittering Hope	6	5-2	28.82	Adam Jackson (Clapton)
2nd	Sunbow	Prairie Flash - Dainty Sister	1	2-1f	29.26	Nora Gleeson (Wimbledon)
3rd	Shy Prairie	Prairie Flash - Craggs Pet	3	9-1	29.48	Jack Toseland (Perry Barr)
4th	Creggan Bush	Mile Bush Pride - Creggandoveskey	4	3-1	29.78	Reg Webb (Private)
5th	Flash Solar	Solar Prince - Cinders	5	100-8	30.24	Stan Mitchell (Perry Barr)
6th	Greenane Flame	Knock Hill Chieftain - Wild Princess	2	11-2	00.00	Jack Harvey (Wembley)

=== Distances ===
5¾, 3, 4, 6, Dis (lengths)
The distances between the greyhounds are in finishing order and shown in lengths. From 1950 one length was equal to 0.08 of one second.

== Competition Report ==
The 1965 Derby lacked a greyhound of the calibre of Magourna Reject, Endless Gossip or Mile Bush Pride, resulting in a wide-open competition when the bookmakers compiled the ante-post prices. Leading the list were Booked Out, trained privately by Eric Adkins, the Northern raider Clonmannon Flash, Cesarewitch champion Clifden Orbit and defending champion Hack Up Chieftain. Cranog Bet was missing with an injury and Hi Joe, the ante-post favourite at the turn of the year, had disappeared. In January the Juvenile champion trained by Noreen Collin and owned by bookmaker Victor Chandler Sr. was stolen from his Epping kennels. Initial hopes were that he could be recovered quickly to allow him to line up for the Greyhound Derby as planned. Sadly, as the weeks passed Collin received countless phone calls that led nowhere.

Hack Up Chieftain failed to even make the final 48 after the qualifying trials and lost his £60 entry fee. New rules determined that all of the entry fee £60 or £100 for late entries would be lost if failing to make the first round proper. Previously, just £5 or £10 of the entry fee was forfeited. When the first round competition started, five of the top seven ante-post market leaders failed to progress from the first round. Booked Out finished third after trouble in his heat and then was knocked out in the second round. Clifden Orbit made it through to the semi-finals but further trouble in the semis produced the top four left in the betting all going home including Clifden Orbit.

The final contained six greyhounds that no one could have predicted. Sunbow, trained by first year trainer Nora Gleeson, was the favourite. The night before the final there was an attempt by a gang to infiltrate the kennels of Creggan Bush which was foiled by a group of his owners. The race was an anti-climax with the Adam Jackson trained Chittering Clapton from Clapton Stadium being quick away and then drawing clear to win by five and three quarter lengths. Bunching at the first bend led to Greenane Flame being knocked over.

Chittering Clapton had been purchased for just £25 and started the competition at 250–1. The fawn and white dog collected £5,000, the biggest ever prize on offer in the history of the sport up to this date.

== See also ==
- 1965 UK & Ireland Greyhound Racing Year
