= 1950 English Greyhound Derby =

- Location: White City Stadium
- Start date: 10 June
- End date: 24 June
- Total prize money: £1,500 (winner)

The 1950 Greyhound Derby took place during June with the final being held on 24 June 1950 at White City Stadium. The winner Ballymac Ball and his owner, Belfast bookmaker Tom F Nicholl, received a first prize of £1,500. The greyhound was trained by Stan Martin.

== Final result ==
At White City (over 525 yards):

Position	Name of Greyhound	Breeding	Trap	SP	Time	Trainer
1st	Ballymac Ball	Lone Seal - Raging Tornado	4	7-2	28.72	Stan Martin (Wimbledon)
2nd	Quare Customer	Mad Tanist - Queen of Song	5	9-2	28.98	Leslie Reynolds (Wembley)
3rd	Captain The Killer	Tanist - Fly Dancer	6	100-8	29.42	Norman Merchant (Private)
4th	Drumgoon Boy	Brainy Fellow - Merry Pearl	1	100-3	29.66	Fred Trevillion (Private)
5th	Magna Hasty	Model Dasher - Mary Hasty	3	50-1	29.90	Stan Martin (Wimbledon)
6th	Ballycurren Garrett	Ballycurreen Duke - Ballymakeera Keeper	2	7-4f	30.22	Jack Harvey (Wembley)

=== Distances ===
3¼, 5½, 3, 2, 4 (lengths)
The distances between the greyhounds are in finishing order and shown in lengths. From 1927-1950 one length was equal to 0.06 of one second but race times are shown as 0.08 as per modern day calculations.

== Review ==
Red Wind was made the ante-post favourite before the competition got underway, the fawn dog had won the Grand Prix and Midland Puppy Derby but in qualifying for the second round suffered a minor injury. Greenwood Tanist was the first shock of the competition as the 2-1 favourite failed to qualify after going lame.

Round two saw Red Wind recover from his injury and secure a nine length victory in a fast 28.70. Another favourite, Ballymac Ball showed a strong finish to catch long time leaders Loyal Accomplice and Magna Hasty in his heat.

In the first semi-final Quare Customer won from Magna Hasty and Drumgoon Boy. In the second semi-final Red Wind faded after being well placed and was eliminated, the race was won by Ballycurren Garrett with Ballymac Ball and Captain the Killer claiming the qualifying places. Red Wind was found to be lame again after pulling a muscle.

In the final Ballymac Ball broke well with Quare Customer challenging, however Ballymac Ball maintained a healthy lead and ran out over three lengths in front recording 28.72, a new final record. The favourite Ballycurren Garrett had missed the break and encountered crowding with the others, leaving one of the sport's biggest owners George Flintham still awaiting success in the Derby.

== See also ==
1950 UK & Ireland Greyhound Racing Year
