= 1995 English Greyhound Derby =

- Location: Wimbledon Stadium
- End date: 24 June
- Total prize money: £50,000 (winner)

The 1995 Daily Mirror/Sporting Life Greyhound Derby Final took place on 24 June 1995 at Wimbledon Stadium. The winner Moaning Lad received £50,000. The competition was sponsored by the Sporting Life and Daily Mirror.

== Final result ==
At Wimbledon (over 480 metres):

Position	Name of Greyhound	Breeding	Trap	SP	Time	Trainer
1st	Moaning Lad	Kyle Jack - Lady Bellamy	3	5-2	28.66	Theo Mentzis (Private)
2nd	Summerhill Joy	Low Sail - Grange Joy	6	3-1	28.70	Michael Enright (Ireland)
3rd	Curryhills Fancy	Deenside Spark - Westpark Schull	5	50-1	28.82	Linda Mullins (Walthamstow)
4th	Pearls Girl	Flashy Sir - Desert Pearl	1	2-1f	28.98	Sam Sykes (Wimbledon)
5th	Mustang Joe	Ardfert Sean - Yairs Gold	2	5-1	29.14	Patsy Byrne (Wimbledon)
6th	Heres Seanie	Ardfert Sean - Mindys Miracle	4	5-1	29.15	Pat Ryan (Perry Barr)

=== Distances ===
½, 1½, 2, 2, short head (lengths)
The distances between the greyhounds are in finishing order and shown in lengths. One length is equal to 0.08 of one second.

=== Competition Report ===
The ante-post favourite was Heres Seanie, winner of the Coronation Cup at Romford and Blue Riband at Wembley but by the time the final came around he had lost the favourites tag after failing to secure a heat win throughout the competition. Byrne International winner Pearls Girl was installed the favourite for the final after drawing her favoured red box, the British bred fawn and white bitch had only been beaten once and was the only one to defeat Moaning Lad during the competition. It was however Moaning Lad that deservedly won by just half a length after being chased down well by the Irish hope Summerhill Joy.

== See also ==
- 1995 UK & Ireland Greyhound Racing Year
