= 2010 English Greyhound Derby =

Greyhound racing event

- Location: Wimbledon Stadium
- Start date: 29 April
- End date: 29 May
- Total prize money: £75,000 (winner)

The 2010 William Hill Greyhound Derby Final took place during April and May with the final being held on 29 May 2010 at Wimbledon Stadium. The competition was sponsored by William Hill following the end of the sponsorship deal with Blue Square. The winner Bandicoot Tipoki received £75,000.

The event was still over 480 metres, but Wimbledon had switched the grandstand to the other side of the track creating a different course. Six rounds were to take place and the final saw the field finish within two lengths of each other. One greyhound, Lyreen Mover, kennelled at Tony Magnasco's in Oxfordshire, reached the final unbeaten under Hungarian trainer Gabor Tenczel. This was the first time an entry had been received from outside the UK or Ireland.

Bandicoot Tipoki moved wide at the start and impeded Krug Ninety Five. There was a battle at the front between Lyreen Mover and Toomaline Jack which lasted all the way to the line. Tipoki, however, finished well and claimed victory near the line. Charlie Lister won his fifth greyhound Derby and equalled the post-war record of five wins by Leslie Reynolds.

== Final result ==
At Wimbledon (over 480 metres):

Position	Name of Greyhound	Breeding	Trap	Sectional	SP	Time	Trainer
1st	Bandicoot Tipoki	Crash - Bandicoot Lola	3	4.95	7-2	28.57	Charlie Lister OBE (Private)
2nd	Lyreen Mover	Top Honcho - Lyreen Diva	2	4.78	6-1	28.61	Gabor Tenczel (Hungary)
3rd	Krug Ninety Five	Droopys Maldini - Frontier Music	4	5.05	12-1	28.62	Fraser Black (Ireland)
4th	Oran Classic	Top Honcho - Jo Bluebell	1	4.89	7-1	28.63	John McGee Sr. (Ireland)
5th	Toomaline Jack	Hallucinate - Mercury Queen	5	4.84	10-11f	28.64	Dolores Ruth (Ireland)
6th	Adageo	Droopys Vieri - Droopys Nectar	6	4.82	28-1	28.71	Mark Wallis (Harlow)

=== Distances ===
½, short head, short head, short head, ¾ (lengths)
The distances between the greyhounds are in finishing order and shown in lengths. One length is equal to 0.08 of one second.

== Quarter finals ==
Heat 1 (May 18)
Pos	Name	SP	Time
1st	Westmead Scolari	11-2	28.49
2nd	Glenard Sunrise	3-1	28.51
3rd	Oran Classic	7-1	28.64
4th	Moneygall Obama	9-2	28.68
5th	Eye Onthe Tempo	25-1	28.88
6th	Mesedo Blue	6-4f	28.94

Heat 2 (May 18)
Pos	Name	SP	Time
1st	Romeo Reason	5-2	28.50
2nd	Head Iton Ellis	5-1	28.51
3rd	Slick Robert	6-1	28.53
4th	Barefoot Bullet	11-8f	28.61
5th	Kerrs Destiny	50-1	28.89
6th	Gilbeyhall Jake	10-1	00.00

Heat 3 (May 18)
Pos	Name	SP	Time
1st	Toomaline Jack	1-2f	28.37
2nd	Krug Ninety Five	7-1	28.56
3rd	Adageo	12-1	28.74
4th	Roo Come On	7-1	28.79
5th	Cloheena Cash	33-1	28.96
6th	Rainham Giles	8-1	29.16

Heat 4 (May 18)
Pos	Name	SP	Time
1st	Lyreen Mover	4-1	28.75
2nd	Bandicoot Tipoki	15-8f	28.78
3rd	Farloe Skywalker	5-2	28.87
4th	Sevenheads Boy	7-1	28.94
5th	Tranquil Time	7-1	29.02
6th	Tyrur Speedy	16-1	29.08

== Semi finals ==
First Semi Final (May 22)
Pos	Name of Greyhound	SP	Time	Trainer
1st	Lyreen Mover	3-1jf	28.59	Tenczel
2nd	Oran Classic	7-1	28.60	McGee Sr.
3rd	Krug Ninety Five	4-1	28.66	Black
4th	Glenard Sunrise	4-1	28.68	Dartnall
5th	Westmead Scolari	3-1jf	28.78	Savva
6th	Slick Robert	6-1	28.85	Allsop

Second Semi Final (May 22)
Pos	Name of Greyhound	SP	Time	Trainer
1st	Toomaline Jack	11-10f	28.51	Ruth
2nd	Bandicoot Tipoki	11-4	28.70	Lister
3rd	Adageo	25-1	28.71	Wallis
4th	Head Iton Ellis	12-1	28.73	Race
5th	Farloe Skywalker	10-1	28.84	Dartnall
6th	Romeo Reason	5-1	28.90	McNair

== Competition report ==
The number of entries increased by 69 on the previous year resulting in 215 greyhounds lining up for the event. The ante post favourite at 7-1 was Eye Onthe Storm trained by Mark Wallis; the black and white dog had won the Eclipse, Puppy Classic and Blue Riband.

The new course duly created a series of new tracks records on the first night, (Eye Eye Pickle (28.48) was followed by Aero Ardiles (28.38) and Bandicott Tipoki (28.26), the first night however was ruined by the serious injury and elimination of Eye Onthe Storm. Fear Zafonic and Barefoot Bullet stood out during the remaining qualifiers. Bandocoot Tipoki went fastest again during the second round recording 28.35 and there were good wins for Juvenile champion Ten Large Down and Toomaline Jack but Fear Zafonic crashed out.

The third round caused a surprise when both Ten Large Down and Scottish Greyhound Derby champion Nambisco were eliminated, overseas entry Lyreen Mover remained unbeaten as did Mesedo Blue, Toomaline Jack and favourite Bandicoot Tipoki. The first quarter final went to Westmead Scolari, a heat that saw Mesedo Blue go out and this was followed by a win for Romeo Reason and elimination of Barefoot Bullet. Tommaline Jack impressed in the third heat recording a fast 28.37 and the round ended with Lyreen Mover defeating Bandicoot Tipoki by a neck. It was clear at this stage that Lyreen Mover would be hard to break clear off.

The first semi final went once again to Lyreen Mover by just a head with Oran Classic and Krug Ninety Five sealing places for Ireland in the final. The two favourites Toomaline Jack and Bandicoot Tipoki claimed the first and second place in heat two with Adageo grabbing the final spot.

== See also ==
- 2010 UK & Ireland Greyhound Racing Year
