= 1985 English Greyhound Derby =

1985 edition of the English Greyhound Derby

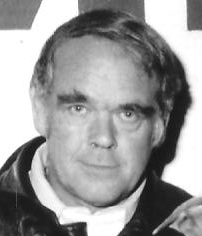
- Phil Rees (junior) emulated his father's 1976 success by winning the Derby with Pagan Swallow.
- Location: Wimbledon Stadium
- Start date: 21 May
- End date: 22 June
- Total prize money: £25,000 (winner)

The 1985 Daily Mirror Greyhound Derby took place during May and June with the final being held on 22 June 1985 at Wimbledon Stadium. It was the first time that Wimbledon hosted the event following the closure of the White City Stadium. The winner was Pagan Swallow and the winning owner David Hawthorn received £25,000. The competition was sponsored by the Daily Mirror.

== Final result ==
At Wimbledon (over 480 metres):

Position	Name of Greyhound	Breeding	Trap	SP	Time	Trainer
1st	Pagan Swallow	Black Earl - Acres of Apples	5	9-1	29.04	Philip Rees Jr. (Wimbledon)
2nd	Jack the Hiker	Oran Jack - Killone Hiker	3	10-1	29.08	Matt O'Donnell (Ireland)
3rd	Carrigeen Chimes	Brilliant Chimes - Best Away	6	11-2	29.10	Gary Baggs (Ramsgate)
4th	Walstone	Limerick Echo - Drawn Near	1	3-1	29.26	John Copplestone (Portsmouth)
5th	Smokey Pete	Smokey Flame - Smokey Cotton	2	8-11f	29.30	Kenny Linzell (Walthamstow)
6th	House Hunter	Tiger Jazz - Brass Tacks	4	20-1	29.34	Gunner Smith (Hove)

=== Distances ===
½, head, 2, ½, ½ (lengths)
The distances between the greyhounds are in finishing order and shown in lengths. One length is equal to 0.08 of one second.

== Competition Report ==
Fearless Champ started as the 10-1 ante post favourite followed by Pall Mall Stakes champion Hong Kong Mike (12-1) and Daleys Gold (14-1). Ballyregan Bob bypassed the event because the distance of the race was considered too short.

Wimbledon's standard distance was 460 metres so a new distance of 480 metres was created for the 1985 Derby. This meant that track records would be set and beaten and the first to break the record went to Bertie Gaynor's Lloydsboro Flash in 28.71. Three races later Fearless Champ from the De Mulder kennels recorded 28.66. On the final night of qualifying Morans Beef recorded 28.60.

In round one Hong Kong Mike and Rugged Mick won well but the following night weather conditions played a big part in the elimination of Fearless Champ when heavy rain contributed to his exit. Morans Beef, Daleys Gold, Ballintubber One and Smokey Pete all progressed from wet heats.

Morans Beef won his second round heat to remain unbeaten but chipped a bone in his foot and was eventually withdrawn and retired to stud. Smokey Pete caught leader Daleys Gold to win his heat and Keeper Tom won a race that ended with Laurels champion Amenhotep sustaining severe cuts. Hong Kong Mike, Ballintubber One and Rugged Mick all went out.

Daleys Gold won his quarter-final by ten lengths missing a melee that saw Keeper Tom finish third but go lame and add his name to the list of casualties. The other quarter-final heat winners were Minestrone, Clod Hopper and Smokey Pete.

Daleys Gold and One to Note vied for the lead in the first semi-final before bumping caused them to lose ground meaning Walstone, House Hunter and Jack the Hiker all qualified. The remaining semi-final saw Smokey Pete outstay Pagan Swallow and Carrigeen Chimes.

Smokey Pete lined up for the final at odds of 8-11 favourite. Jack the Hiker and Carrigeen Chimes challenged for the lead throughout until Pagan Swallow came with a late run to take the victory. Smokey Pete had found crowding and finished a disappointing fifth. A Wimbledon greyhound had won the first Derby that they had hosted with the Rees family becoming the second father and son to each win the Derby. On the supporting card both Ballyregan Bob and Scurlogue Champ eased to twelve and ten length victories respectively.

== See also ==
- 1985 UK & Ireland Greyhound Racing Year
