= 2011 English Greyhound Derby =

Greyhound racing event

- Location: Wimbledon Stadium
- Start date: 13 May
- End date: 11 June
- Total prize money: £75,000 (winner)

The 2011 William Hill Greyhound Derby took place during May and June with the final being held on 11 June 2011 at Wimbledon Stadium.

Trainer Charlie Lister won greyhound racing's premier event for a sixth time (a new record), one better than the five wins by Leslie Reynolds many years previous. Taylors Sky won the first prize of £75,000 and broke the track record in the final.

== Final result ==
At Wimbledon (over 480 metres):

Position	Name of Greyhound	Breeding	Trap	Sectional	SP	Time	Trainer
1st	Taylors Sky	Westmead Hawk - Rising Angel	1	4.80	7-4f	28.17+	Charlie Lister OBE (Private)
2nd	Westmead Guru	Tyrur Ted - Westmead Swift	3	4.84	4-1	28.50	Kelly Findlay (Sittingbourne)
3rd	Barefoot Bullet	Honcho Classic - Ard Flashc	5	4.80	9-4	28.59	Paul Hennessy (Ireland)
4th	Cloheena Cash	Crash - Leahs Ruby	6	4.83	11-1	28.61	Norah McEllistrim (Wimbledon)
5th	Razldazl George	Kinloch Brae - Razldazl Pearl	4	4.89	7-2	28.82	Dolores Ruth (Ireland)
6th	Bright Redcliffe	Hallucinate - Youlbesolucky	2	4.94	16-1	28.94	John McGoldrick (Private)

+ Track record

=== Distances ===
4, 1¼, head, 2½, 1½ (lengths)
The distances between the greyhounds are in finishing order and shown in lengths. One length is equal to 0.08 of one second.

== Competition Report ==
Before the competition began the defending champion Bandicoot Tipoki had finished lame in a trial stake and was retired to stud. Despite the loss of Bandicoot Tipoki Charlie Lister sent a strong team which included Scottish Greyhound Derby champion Taylors Cruise, 16-1 ante post favourite Boher Paddy, Taylors Sky, Jordansoilutions, Boher Ash and Yahoo Jamie. Other main contenders were track record holder Droopys Oscar, trained by Seamus Cahill (20-1), Tyrur Big Mike (25-1), Blue Artisan, the Gymcrack champion (33-1). The main Irish threat came from trainer Dolores Ruth who had three fast hounds called Razldazl Jayfkay, Razldazl George, and Makeshift. Three of the previous year’s finalists were back in Krug Ninety Five, Hungarian hound Lyreen Mover and Adageo but all three were not expected to challenge.

In the first round the Irish pair; Razldazl Jayfkay recorded 28.35 and Razldazl George 28.42. Blue Artisan beat Taylors Sky by a length in 28.47 and Makeshift recorded 28.55. Casualties included Droopys Oscar and Blonde Snapper.

During the second round 2009 English Greyhound Derby champion Kinda Ready and veteran campaigner Glenard Sunrise failed to make it through to round three as did makeshift an Romeo Reason. Razldazl George and Jayfkay both won again in 28.27 and 28.33 to become the new favourites.

In round three Razldazl Jayfkay broke the track record by recording 28.22 in the first heat, Barefoot Bullet then won in 28.26 before Jordansoilutions qualified despite being knocked over, he crossed the line in third place after three hounds all hit the deck. Boher Paddy, Taylors Cruise and Shaws Dilemma all failed to progress.

Blue Artisan crashed out in heat one of the quarter-finals before Taylors Sky broke the track record in the next heat from trap one (28.21) in a strong heat that saw Razldazl Jayfkay and Boher Legend outside of the qualifying places. Barefoot Bullet won the third quarter and the last was taken by outsider Cloheena Cash.

Taylors Sky then equalled his own track record in the first semi-final beating Barefoot Bullet and Bright Redcliffe. Razldazl George continued his good form taking the second from Cloheena Cash and Westmead Guru, Nambisco just missed out finishing fourth.

In the final Taylors Sky led on the run up and broke the track record again when winning in 28.17. Westmead Guru was bumped at the start and ran on well to take second place although still four lengths behind the winner. The Irish pair Barefoot Bullet and Razldazl George could not challenge the winner in the decider despite great form going into the final.

== Quarter finals ==
Heat 1 (May 31)
Pos	Name	SP	Time
1st	Melodys Royal	3-1	28.61
2nd	Bright Redcliffe	8-1	28.74
3rd	Destroy The Camp	11-4	28.76
4th	Blue Artisan	5-4f	28.98
5th	Buzz Doc	16-1	29.05
6th	Ballymac Barrell	33-1	29.28

Heat 2 (May 31)
Pos	Name	SP	Time
1st	Taylors Sky+	10-1	28.21
2nd	Nambisco	9-2	28.67
3rd	Bellers Bud	33-1	28.90
4th	Boher Legend	9-2	28.91
5th	Razldazl Jayfkay	8-13f	28.95
6th	Modern Man	33-1	29.06

+ Track record

Heat 3 (May 31)
Pos	Name	SP	Time
1st	Barefoot Bullet	8-11f	28.50
2nd	Westmead Guru	6-1	28.54
3rd	Deanridge Viking	5-1	28.65
4th	Big Pair	50-1	28.75
5th	Krug Ninety Five	7-1	28.86
6th	Coom Bullet	10-1	29.19

Heat 4 (May 31)
Pos	Name	SP	Time
1st	Cloheena Cash	14-1	28.49
2nd	Razldazl George	4-9f	28.51
3rd	Fifis Rocket	7-2	28.54
4th	Jordansoilutions	10-1	28.86
5th	Rockview Head	25-1	28.89
6th	Westmead Logan	20-1	29.06

== Semi finals ==
First Semi-final (June 4)
Pos	Name of Greyhound	SP	Time	Trainer
1st	Taylors Sky++	13-8f	28.21	Lister
2nd	Barefoot Bullet	2-1	28.27	Hennessy
3rd	Bright Redcliffe	8-1	28.45	McGoldrick
4th	Deanridge Viking	14-1	28.87	Price
5th	Destroy The Camp	8-1	28.91	Houfton
6th	Fifis Rocket	7-1	28.96	Allsopp

++ Equalled Track record

Second Semi-final (June 4)
Pos	Name of Greyhound	SP	Time	Trainer
1st	Razldazl George	2-1jf	28.51	Ruth
2nd	Cloheena Cash	10-1	28.70	McEllistrim
3rd	Westmead Guru	11-2	28.71	Findlay
4th	Nambisco	2-1jf	28.73	Philpott
5th	Melodys Royal	9-2	28.84	Fitzgerald
6th	Bellers Bud	33-1	28.90	Wallis

== See also ==
- 2011 UK & Ireland Greyhound Racing Year
