= Ballymac Ball =

Racing greyhound

- Sire: Lone Seal
- Dam: Raging Tornado
- Sex: Dog
- Whelped: September 1946
- Color: Brindle
- Breeder: Reidy
- Owner: Tom F Nicholl
- Trainer: Stan Martin

Major wins
- English Greyhound Derby (1950); Laurels (1949, 1950); International (1950, 1951); Wimbledon Spring Cup (1950)

Honours
- 1950 English Greyhound Derby champion

Ballymac Ball was a famous racing greyhound during the late 1940s and early 1950s.

== Breeding and rearing ==
Ballymac Ball was whelped during September 1949 and bred by Reidy.

== Racing ==
=== 1948 ===
Ballymac Ball impressed in his first races in Ireland and recorded some of the fastest times at Celtic Park. His owner Tom Nicholl planned for him to be sent to England in an attempt to win the English Greyhound Derby.

=== 1949 ===
The brindle dog arrived in the United Kingdom during February 1949 and was placed in the Hook Estate and Kennels training out of White City. His first race in England was at Stamford Bridge on 14 May.

He was aimed at the 1949 English Greyhound Derby at White City and was described as the Greyhound Racing Association's best chance to claim the trophy but crashed out in the first round in heat six. Nicholl switched trainers and put him with Stan Martin at Wimbledon Stadium which proved to be a wise decision because Ballymac Ball was an instant hit at the track. Just two months after the Derby defeat he won the Laurels at Wimbledon over 500 yards. In the heats he broke the track record recording 28.03 and then bettered it in the semi-finals when posting 27.99, becoming the first greyhound to break 28 seconds over 500 yards at Wimbledon.

After the Laurels he competed in the Silver Salver at Southend Stadium; he won both heat and semi final but on 19 September lost the final to Red Wind, who break the track record in the process. After a rest he reappeared on 10 December at White City over 550 yards and broke the track record recording 30.30 and then on Boxing Day he went even faster by setting a new record of 30.27.

=== 1950 ===
The main target for 1950 was the 1950 English Greyhound Derby but before this he won the 16th International (January), the Wimbledon Spring Cup (March) and reached the Wood Lane Stakes final (April) where he lost to his great rival Red Wind.

When the 1950 Derby got underway Ballymac Ball had won 19 races from 23 starts for Stan Martin and was a leading contender but the ante post favourite was his rival Red Wind. Ballymac Ball progressed through the heats by winning his heat on the 10 June and won his second round race despite a horrible start on 15 June. He finished second in his semi final on 17 June behind Ballycurren Garrett and a race in which Red Wind was eliminated. In the final he led all the way and recorded 28.72 which was the fastest Derby final win to date.

Ballymac Ball continued his impressive form by successfully defending his Laurels title.

=== 1951 ===
In January he won the 17th International before retiring to stud where he became a successful sire.

== Pedigree ==
Macoma
Silver Seal
Yatton Tiny
Lone Seal
Mutton Cutlet
Lucky Plum
Last Plum
Ballymac Ball
Creamery Border
Cherokee Border
Cutlets Return
Raging Tornado
Ocean Might
Coady's Luck
Evelyns Bank
