= 2014 English Greyhound Derby =

Greyhound racing event

- Location: Wimbledon Stadium
- Start date: 1 May
- End date: 31 May
- Total prize money: £200,000 (winner)

The 2014 William Hill Greyhound Derby took place during May with the final being held on 31 May 2014 at Wimbledon Stadium. The final worth a record £200,000 was won by a competition outsider called Salad Dodger.

== Final result ==
At Wimbledon (over 480 metres):

Position	Name of Greyhound	Breeding	Trap	Sectional	SP	Time	Trainer
1st	Salad Dodger	Crash - Airforce Stacey	2	4.80	16-1	28.37	Bruno Berwick (Private)
2nd	Droopys Ward	Westmead Hawk - Droopys Orleans	3	4.90	6-1	28.47	Paul Young (Romford)
3rd	Crokers Champ	Kinloch Brae - Honey Shine	1	4.77	5-2	28.48	Peter Cronin (Ireland)
4th	Kincraig Rory	Hondo Black - Kincraig Brindle	5	4.92	20-1	28.60	Tony Collett (Sittingbourne)
5th	Mind the Net	Westmead Hawk - Black Biscuit	4	4.83	1-1f	28.73	Pat Buckley (Ireland)
6th	Farloe Trent	Hondo Black - Final Pearl	6	4.84	7-1	28.93	Liz McNair (Private)

=== Distances ===
1/2, short head, 2, 3/4, 1 1/4 (lengths)
The distances between the greyhounds are in finishing order and shown in lengths. One length is equal to 0.08 of one second.

=== Race Report ===
As the lids lifted it was Crokers Champ with his customary early pace that took up the running. Salad Dodger also broke well and was well positioned as Droopys Ward began to make progress with his strong finish. The British bred Salad Dodger caught the Irish leader on the run in to claim the huge prize with Droopys Ward just failing to catch Salad Dodger after overtaking Crokers Champ for second place. Trainer Bruno Berwick had recently left Coventry following its closure and this had influenced his decision when deciding whether to enter Salad Dodger for the event.

== Quarter finals ==
Heat 1 (Jun 20)
Pos	Name	SP	Time
1st	Aero Nemesis	13-8f	28.37
2nd	Brother John	4-1	28.54
3rd	Salad Dodger	12-1	28.57
4th	Vanrooney	6-1	28.63
5th	Thatchers Champ	10-1	28.64
6th	Fiery Splendour	5-2	28.71

Heat 2 (Jun 20)
Pos	Name	SP	Time
1st	Crokers Champ	11-8f	28.73
2nd	Kincraig Rory	16-1	28.89
3rd	Blackrose Vic	25-1	28.91
4th	Holdem Spy	7-4	28.92
5th	Sidarian Teejay	6-1	28.93
6th	Laughil George	6-1	29.40

Heat 3 (Jun 20)
Pos	Name	SP	Time
1st	Mind The Net	11-8f	28.09
2nd	Metro Jack	9-2	28.58
3rd	Ecclestone	3-1	28.79
4th	Ballymac Loch	12-1	28.83
5th	Jaytee Hawaii	10-1	28.99
6th	Jet Stream Duke	7-1	29.06

Heat 4 (Jun 20)
Pos	Name	SP	Time
1st	Salacres Chicken	5-2	28.28
2nd	Farloe Trent	8-1	28.39
3rd	Droopys Ward	10-11f	28.43
4th	Up To It	6-1	28.62
5th	Roxholme Ted	14-1	28.65
6th	Jordans Brianna	11-4	00.00

== Semi finals ==
First Semi Final (Jun 24)
Pos	Name of Greyhound	SP	Time	Trainer
1st	Droopys Ward	12-1	28.24	Young
2nd	Crokers Champ	10-11f	28.36	Cronin
3rd	Salad Dodger	16-1	28.39	Berwick
4th	Metro Jack	3-1	28.62	Cronin
5th	Salacres Chicken	10-1	28.73	McNair
6th	Ecclestone	9-2	28.76	Hennessy

Second Semi Final (Jun 24)
Pos	Name of Greyhound	SP	Time	Trainer
1st	Mind The Net	11-8f	28.42	Buckley
2nd	Kincraig Rory	25-1	28.52	Collett
3rd	Farloe Trent	14-1	28.60	McNair
4th	Aero Nemesis	6-4	28.75	Wallis
5th	Brother John	6-1	28.76	Cahill
6th	Blackrose Vic	14-1	29.15	Cantillon

== See also ==
- 2014 UK & Ireland Greyhound Racing Year
