= 2022 English Greyhound Derby =

Greyhound racing event

- Location: Towcester Greyhound Stadium
- Start date: 19 May
- End date: 25 June
- Total prize money: £175,000 (winner)

The 2022 Star Sports Greyhound Derby took place during May and June 2022, with the final being held on 25 June 2022 at Towcester Greyhound Stadium.

It was the fourth time that the event was held at Towcester after previously being run there in 2017, 2018 and 2021. The dates of the competition were as follows - first round 19, 20 & 21 May, second round 27 & 28 May, third round 4 June, quarter finals 11 June, semi finals 18 June.

There were 211 entries resulting in 19 greyhounds standing as reserves for the 192 runner competition. In the ante post betting the relatively inexperienced Irish pair of Coolavanny Calvn and Part Blake headed the field, closely followed by defending champion Thorn Falcon. Other major contenders would be Signet Ace, Singalong Sally and Ballymac Fairone.

Romeo Magico, a black and white dog won the event and the first prize of £175,000. The greyhound was trained by Graham Holland, owned and bred by David Firmager.

== Final result ==
At Towcester (over 500 metres): Winner £175,000

Pos	Name of Greyhound	Breeding	Trap	Sectional	Race comment	SP	Time	Trainer
1st	Romeo Magico	Magical Bale – Fabulous Artist	4	4.23	RlsTMid,EP,Led½	5/2	28.95	Graham Holland (Ireland)
2nd	Kildare	Droopys Sydney – Palermo	2	4.17	MidTRls,QAw,LedTo½	9/4f	29.09	Peter Cronin (Ireland)
3rd	Mickys Barrett	Out Of Range ASB – The Other Tessa	5	4.18	Mid,QAw	20/1	29.30	Jason Gray (Nottingham)
4th	Priceless Jet	Droopys Jet – Ravenna	6	4.23	MidTW,FcdToCk2&4	10/3	29.34	Paul Hennessy (Ireland)
5th	Hello Hammond	Jaytee Jet – Jaytee Pearl	3	4.26	Mid,Crd1,RanOn	5/1	29.38	Paul Hennessy (Ireland)
6th	Savana Beau	Clonbrien Hero – Slippery Thelma	1	4.32	RlsTMid,SAw,Crd1	16/1	29.44	Diane Henry (Towcester)

=== Final distances ===
1¾, 2½, ½, ½, ¾ (lengths) 0.08 sec = one length

=== Final report ===
The final contained four Irish runners and two British runners, both of which were large prices in the bookmakers odds. The favourite Kildare broke well and led into the first bend pursued by Mickys Barrett before Romeo Magico showed significant early pace to come up the inside of Kildare and take a decisive halfway lead. Romeo Magico went on to win in a very fast time of 28.95. Priceless Jet was unable to make up any ground after being forced to check behind Mickys Barrett on the third bend but it was unlikely that he would have caught the leaders. Savana Beau and Hello Hammond both failed to get into the race after poor starts and a slight crowding at the first bend with each other.

== Quarter finals ==
Heat 1 (11 June, £1,000)
Pos	Name	SP	Time
1st	Priceless Jet	6/1	28.78 TR
2nd	Kildare	15/8f	29.31
3rd	Coppice Fox	14/1	29.68
4th	Signet Ace	9/4	29.85
5th	Global Vision	8/1	29.95
6th	Cape Cloud	4/1	30.30

Heat 2 (11 June, £1,000)
Pos	Name	SP	Time
1st	Hello Hammond	14/1	29.22
2nd	Faughan Rebel	20/1	29.37
3rd	Deelish Frankie	12/1	29.44
4th	Aussie Captain	12/1	29.46
5th	Ballinabola Ed	4/11f	29.52
6th	Ballymac Fairone	9/2	29.60

Heat 3 (11 June, £1,000)
Pos	Name	SP	Time
1st	Romeo Magico	10/3	29.01
2nd	Make Noise	25/1	29.39
3rd	Lautaro	15/8f	29.48
4th	Derrinasafa Boss	33/1	29.87
5th	Bobsleigh Dream	6/1	29.95
6th	Signet Denver	5/2	30.10

Heat 4 (11 June, £1,000)
Pos	Name	SP	Time
1st	Signet Goofy	3/1	29.21
2nd	Savana Beau	9/1	29.47
3rd	Mickys Barrett	9/1	29.50
4th	Singalong Sally	1/1f	29.53
5th	Ballymac Belvult	20/1	29.54
6th	Kilkenny Santy	9/2	29.65

== Semi finals ==
First Semi-final (18 June, £2,500)
Pos	Name of Greyhound	SP	Time	Trainer
1st	Romeo Magico	6/4f	29.06	Holland
2nd	Mickys Barrett	11/1	29.33	Gray
3rd	Savana Beau	11/1	29.98	Henry
4th	Signet Goofy	2/1	30.05	Mullins
5th	Faughan Rebel	8/1	30.08	Yates
6th	Deelish Frankie	5/1	30.12	Janssens

Second Semi-final (18 June, £2,500)
Pos	Name of Greyhound	SP	Time	Trainer
1st	Kildare	15/8f	29.16	Cronin
2nd	Priceless Jet	3/1	29.21	Hennessy
3rd	Hello Hammond	5/1	29.35	Hennessy
4th	Lautaro	3/1	29.48	Janssens
5th	Make Noise	9/1	29.68	Cahill
6th	Coppice Fox	16/1	30.12	Hutton

== Competition review ==
The first heats were held on the 19 May and the headline was the track record performance by Lautaro from the Patrick Janssens kennel, the brindle and white dog recorded 28.83. Janssens won three other heats with Aussie Captain, Bockos Belly (the former track record holder) and Deelish Frankie. Skywalker Barry (Gold Cup and Select Stakes champion) impressed for the Irish, winning in a time of 29.09 and defeating 2021 Derby finalist Ballymac Fairone. The biggest shock was the elimination of Jaguar Macie, the 2021 bitch of the year. The second set of heats on 20 May saw two of the competition favourites Part Blake and Singalong Sally in the same heat, the former winning by half a length. Another heavyweight heat resulted in Laurels champion Signet Denver beating Coolavanny Calvn and defending champion Thorn Falcon. Denvers's half brother and 2021 greyhound of the year Signet Ace only managed a third place finish in his heat to squeeze through to the next round. The Tralee track record holder Ballinabold Ed impressed with a fast 28.97 winning run, which would have been inside the old track record. The final set of first round heats moved a few names up the ante post betting list due to fast heat wins, in particular three Irish runners; Ballymac Leon (29.04), Barefoot Supremo (29.06) and Bockos Vieira (29.08).

Signet Denver won again in the second round heats with a time of 29.47 and Aussie Captain also claimed a second win. John Mullins scored a quickfire double with Swift Iconic and Signet Goofy before the strongest heat of the round saw Ballinabola Ed defeat Bockos Belly in a very fast 29.07. Heat eight resulted in a win for Signet Ace (29.31), making amends for his first round defeat. Five of the heats were won in times within 8 spots of each other and surprise eliminations included Bubbly Apache, All About Ted and Da Bold Freddie. The remaining second round heats saw Singalong Sally defeat Ballymac Fairone in 29.33 before Romeo on Tilt won in 29.22 in a heat that saw Part Blake eliminated. In an all Irish heat 13 Paul Hennessy's Jaytee Wexford impressed in 29.18 and in heat 15 Romeo Magico defeated the new track record holder Lautaro. The final heat resulted in the fastest of the night as Kildare beat Thorn Falcon in 29.11.

The third round began to define where the title might go and on a slow track Kilkenny Santy (29.60), Ballymac Fairone (29.54) and Signet Goofy (29.55) claimed victories before Singalong Sally recorded a faster 29.34 in a heat that saw the elimination of the defending champion Thorn Falcon. Cape Cloud, Savana Beau and Global Vision won other heats but it was Ballinabola Ed who stood out and became the hot favourite after winning another heat in 29.13. The track was running fast on 12 June when the quarter-finals took place, possibly because the previous round had drawn criticism and the event was thrown wide open when Priceless Jet won the first heat in a new track record time of 28.78. The Hennessy trained runner had not been at his best in the competition but was coming right and won by over six lengths in defeating Kildare and Coppice Fox but Signet Ace failed to progress. The night got better for Hennessy when Hello Hammond claimed heat two at odds of 14/1, while two major contenders Ballinabola Ed and Ballymac Fairone were both eliminated. Romeo Magico won the third heat in 29.01 but Signet Denver went out. The final heat went to John Mullins' Signet Goofy in 29.21, meaning that the brindle dog was the only remaining unbeaten greyhound in the competition.

In the semi-finals the Irish came to prominence once again. Graham Holland's Romeo Magico completed an impressive win from outsider Mickys Barratt, who tracked the winner home. The previously undefeated Signet Goofy could not get into the race after failing to find space at the first bend and was caught by Savana Beau in the later stages of the race. The second semi final provided a clean sweep for the Irish with Kildare trapping well and being chased home by Priceless Jet and Hello Hammond who took a wide course to claim the third and final place. Former track record holder Lautaro was slow away and encountered crowding at the first bend.

== See also ==
- 2022 UK & Ireland Greyhound Racing Year
