= 2015 English Greyhound Derby =

Greyhound racing event

- Location: Wimbledon Stadium
- Start date: 27 May
- End date: 27 June
- Total prize money: £250,000 (winner)

The 2015 William Hill Greyhound Derby took place during May and June with the final being held on 27 June 2015 at Wimbledon Stadium. 273 of Britain's best greyhounds lined up for the record prize of £250,000 that was on offer.

== Final result ==
At Wimbledon (over 480 metres):

Position	Name of Greyhound	Breeding	Trap	Sectional	SP	Time	Trainer
1st	Rio Quattro	Ace Hi Rumble - Droopys Geneva	1	4.78	5-1	28.24	Daniel Riordan (Henlow)
2nd	Tynwald Bish	Vans Escalade - Bish Bash Bosh	6	4.75	10-1	28.34	Peter Cronin (Ireland)
3rd	Eden The Kid	Westmead Hawk - Cabra Jade	4	4.93	4-1	28.35	Liz McNair (Private)
4th	Farloe Blitz	Premier Fantasy - Final Oyster	2	4.70	8-11f	28.43	Owen McKenna (Ireland)
5th	Making Paper	Hondo Black - Quarterland Hope	3	4.91	10-1	28.47	Diane Henry (Private)
6th	Millwards Davy	Black Shaw - Mums Girl	5	4.87	16-1	28.94	Paul Young (Romford)

=== Distances ===
1¼, short head, 1, ½, 5¼ (lengths)
The distances between the greyhounds are in finishing order and shown in lengths. One length is equal to 0.08 of one second.

=== Race Report ===
Farloe Blitz lined up as hot favourite from trap two in the final and when he was first out of the traps in his customary fashion but tucked in just one length behind was Rio Quattro and it remained like that until the third bend when Farloe Blitz drifted to a middle course allowing Rio Quattro to come inside. The Danny Riordan trained runner then went on to win with Farloe Blitz fading into fourth place, Eden The Kid ran very well after a horrible start and just failed to take second place from Tynwald Bish who ran a good race. Making Paper lost any chance at the third bend when making ground on the leaders and Millwards Davy never showed. Eden The Kid had set a new track record in the heats of 27.95sec = 61,82 km/h = 38,42 m/h. .

== Quarter finals ==
Heat 1 (Jun 16)
Pos	Name	SP	Time
1st	Farloe Blitz	4-5f	28.32
2nd	Millwards Davy	12-1	28.41
3rd	Diego Flight	8-1	28.42
4th	Clares Wonder	9-2	28.43
5th	Romany Rouge	8-1	28.62
6th	Evanta Fantasy	10-1	28.65

Heat 2 (Jun 16)
Pos	Name	SP	Time
1st	Eden The Kid	5-4f	28.24
2nd	Rio Quattro	4-1	28.25
3rd	Making Paper	16-1	28.35
4th	Evanta Evita	11-2	28.43
5th	Wotnofizz	20-1	28.59
6th	Boyneside Fun	3-1	29.16

Heat 3 (Jun 16)
Pos	Name	SP	Time
1st	Geelo Vegas	5-1	28.51
2nd	Viking Jack	4-1	28.53
3rd	Roxholme Ted	5-1	28.55
4th	Jaytee Jet	5-1	28.56
5th	Teds Last	3-1f	28.62
6th	Gaytime Hawk	4-1	28.71

Heat 4 (Jun 16)
Pos	Name	SP	Time
1st	Paradise Maverik	5-2	28.28
2nd	Tynwald Bish	8-1	28.39
3rd	Lenson Sanchez	10-11f	28.43
4th	Blonde Nipper	6-1	28.62
5th	Salonkia	14-1	28.65
N/R	Droopys Nidge		

== Semi finals ==
First Semi Final (Jun 20)
Pos	Name of Greyhound	SP	Time	Trainer
1st	Farloe Blitz	11-8f	28.24	McKenna
2nd	Rio Quattro	7-2	28.36	Riordan
3rd	Eden The Kid	3-1	28.39	McNair
4th	Diego Flight	8-1	28.62	McNair
5th	Geelo Vegas	10-1	28.73	Perry
6th	Roxholme Ted	10-1	28.76	Keightley

Second Semi Final (Jun 20)
Pos	Name of Greyhound	SP	Time	Trainer
1st	Making Paper	12-1	28.33	Henry
2nd	Millwards Davy	6-1	28.60	Young
3rd	Tynwald Bish	8-1	28.61	Cronin
4th	Paradise Maverik	15-8f	28.63	Buckley
5th	Lenson Sanchez	5-2	28.67	Buckley
6th	Viking Jack	4-1	28.78	Hayton

== See also ==
- 2015 UK & Ireland Greyhound Racing Year
