= English Greyhound Derby =

Greyhound racing competition

- Class: Classic
- Location: Towcester Greyhound Stadium
- Inaugurated: 1927
- Sponsor: Star Sports; TRC Events

Race information
- Distance: 500 metres
- Surface: Sand
- Purse: £175,000 (winner)

The English Greyhound Derby is the most prestigious race on the British greyhound racing calendar, with a history stretching back to 1927.

It was first held at White City Stadium, but moved to Wimbledon Stadium in 1985, and then Towcester Greyhound Stadium in 2017, Nottingham in 2019 and back to Towcester in 2021. Only four greyhounds have won the event twice, Mick the Miller, Patricias Hope, Rapid Ranger and Westmead Hawk. Trainer Charlie Lister OBE has won the event a record seven times.

== History ==
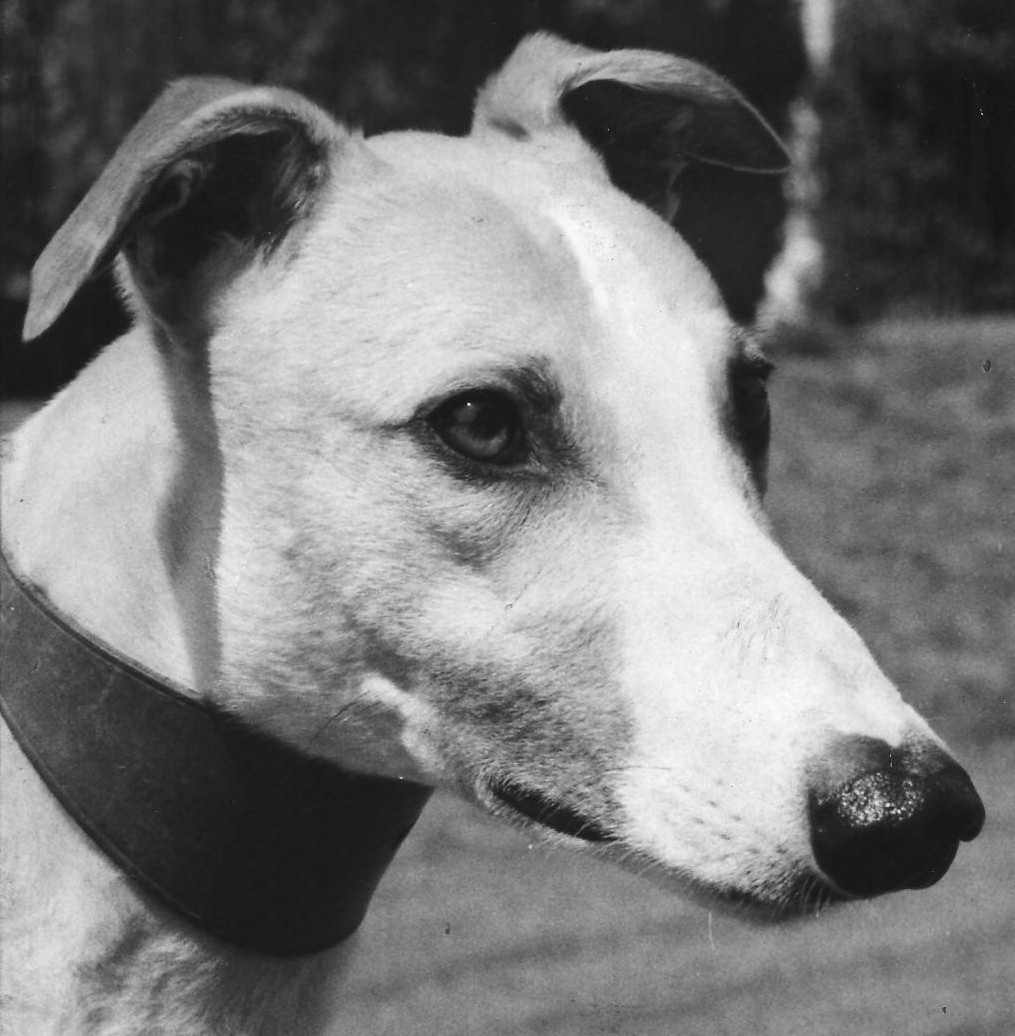
Patricias Hope, twice winner in 1972 & 1973

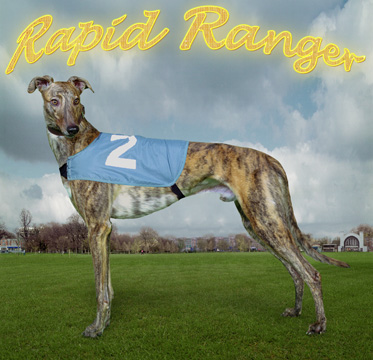
Rapid Ranger, twice winner in 2000 & 2001

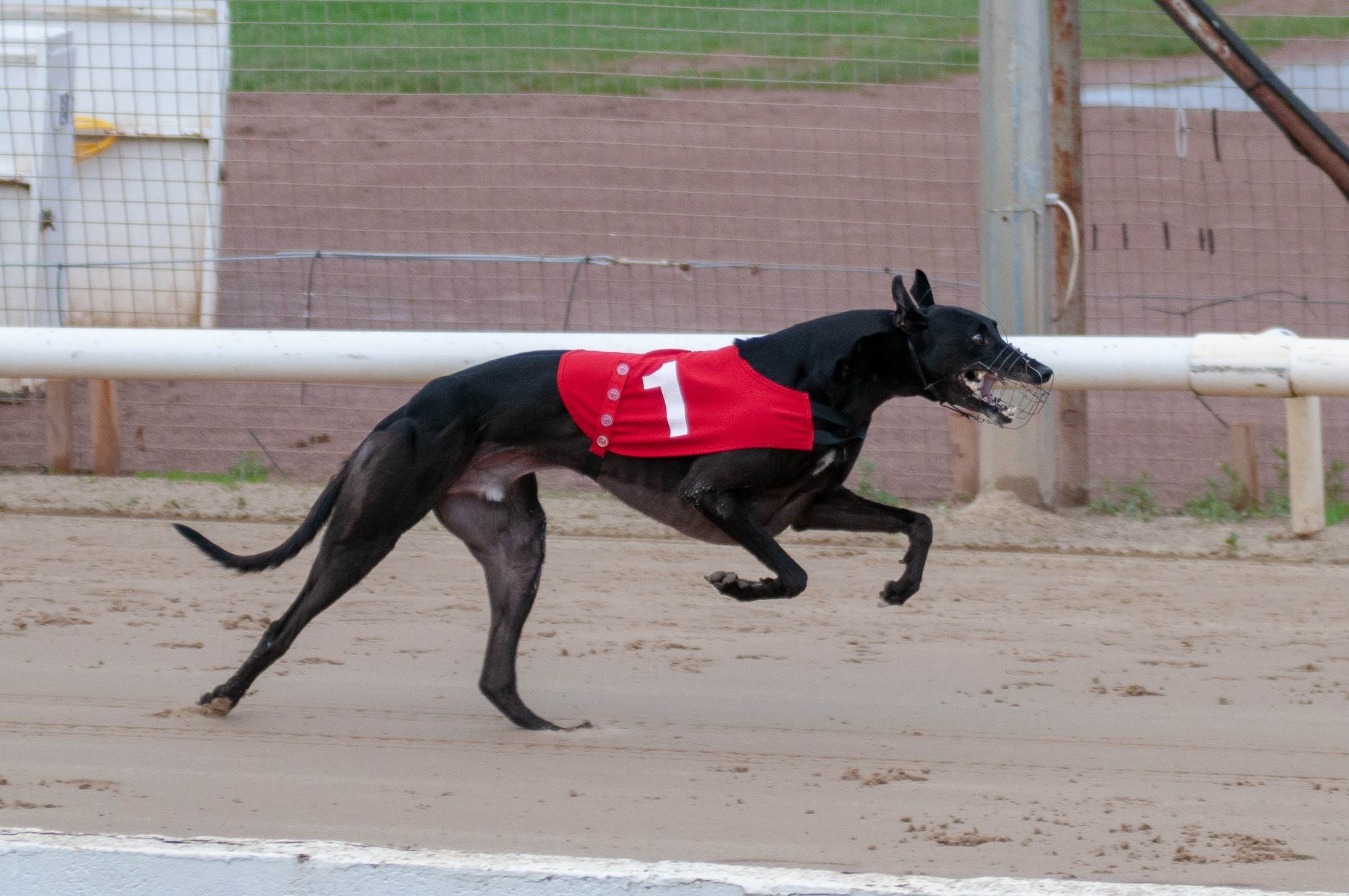
Dorotas Wildcat, 2018 champion

The first venue of the English Greyhound Derby was at White City Stadium, which had been built for the 1908 London Olympics. Greyhound racing had only recently started to take place there, with the first greyhound race only taking place a couple of weeks prior to the first Derby being run. Entry Badge won the first race to be held, winning a £1000 prize for the dog's trainer, Joe Harmon. Two years later, racing greyhound Mick the Miller became the first dog to win multiple Derbys. The 1940 final was held at Harringay Stadium, due to the outbreak of war.

In 1973, pet food manufacturer Spillers sponsored the race for the first time, the same year that Patricias Hope became the second dog to win the Derby on more than one occasion, one of only two dogs to achieve that at White City Stadium. Spillers continued to sponsor the race, increasing the prize money to £35,000 by 1980. The Daily Mirror took over sponsorship of the race in 1983; the following year the race was held at White City for the last time before that stadium closed, with Whisper Wishes becoming the final dog to win the Derby at its original location.

The Derby was moved to Wimbledon Stadium in 1985, and remained there until 2016. The Daily Mirror continued to be the race's sole sponsor until 1990, when the Sporting Life became co-sponsor. In 1998, bookmaker William Hill became the sole sponsor; in 2006, bookmaker Blue Square took over. William Hill later renewed its involvement with greyhounds and the Wimbledon Stadium with a partnership that lasted until 2016.

The 2016 Derby was the last to be held at Wimbledon following the stadium's closure on 25 March 2017 and the redevelopment of the site for housing by the owner Galliard Homes. This resulted in the Derby being located outside London for the first time as Wimbledon was the last greyhound stadium in the capital.

Charlie Lister holds the record as the most successful trainer at the Derby, having won it on seven occasions. He is hailed as the greatest greyhound trainer of all time, and referred to as the 'Derby King'.

On 30 January 2017, it was announced that the event would relocate to the new greyhound stadium, at Towcester Racecourse, for a minimum period of five years. Star Sports sponsored the event for the first time. It switched to Nottingham Greyhound Stadium in 2019 following the closure of Towcester Racecourse in 2018. The 2020 event was rescheduled following a postponement due to the COVID-19 pandemic.

Following the reopening of Towcester Greyhound Stadium, the English Greyhound Derby returned to Towcester for 2021.

== Statistics ==
Stat	Comment
Most wins	2; Mick the Miller, Patricias Hope, Rapid Ranger, Westmead Hawk
Winning trainer	Charlie Lister (7), Leslie Reynolds (5)
Winning bitches	5; 1935, 1949, 1971, 1979, 2003
British v Ireland	British winners (76); Irish winners (19)
Starting prices	Shortest winner: 1927 (1/4f) Longest winner: 2017 (28/1)
Dual derby winners	Toms the Best

=== Winners ===
Year	Venue	Dist	Winner	Trainer	SP	Time (sec)	Note/ref
1927	White City	500y	Entry Badge	Joe Harmon (White City)	1/4f	29.01	
1928	White City	525y	Boher Ash	Tommy Johnston Sr. (Edinburgh)	5/1	30.48	
1929	White City	525y	Mick the Miller	Paddy Horan (Dublin)	4/7f	29.96	
1930	White City	525y	Mick the Miller	Sidney Orton (Wimbledon)	4/9f	30.24	
1931	White City	525y	Seldom Led	Wally Green (West Ham)	7/2	30.04	
1932	White City	525y	Wild Woolley	Jack Rimmer (White City)	5/2	29.72	
1933	White City	525y	Future Cutlet	Sidney Probert (Wembley)	6/1	29.80	
1934	White City	525y	Davesland	Jack Harvey (Harringay)	3/1	29.81	
1935	White City	525y	Greta Ranee	Albert Jonas (White City)	4/1	30.18	
1936	White City	525y	Fine Jubilee	Mrs Marjorie Yate (Private)	10/11f	29.48	
1937	White City	525y	Wattle Bark	Jim Syder Sr. (Wembley)	5/2	29.26	
1938	White City	525y	Lone Keel	Sydney W Wright (Private)	9/4	29.62	
1939	White City	525y	Highland Rum	Paddy Fortune (Wimbledon)	2/1jf	29.35	
1940	Harringay	525y	GR Archduke	Charlie Ashley (Harringay)	100/7	29.66	
1941–1944, not run due to World War II
1945	White City	525y	Ballyhennessy Seal	Stan Martin (Wimbledon)	1/1f	29.56	
1946	White City	525y	Mondays News	Fred Farey (Private)	5/1	29.24	
1947	White City	525y	Trev's Perfection	Fred Trevillion (Private)	4/1	28.95	
1948	White City	525y	Priceless Border	Leslie Reynolds (Wembley)	1/2f	28.78	
1949	White City	525y	Narrogar Ann	Leslie Reynolds (Wembley)	5/1	28.95	
1950	White City	525y	Ballymac Ball	Stan Martin (Wimbledon)	7/2	28.72	
1951	White City	525y	Ballylanigan Tanist	Leslie Reynolds (Wembley)	11/4	28.62	
1952	White City	525y	Endless Gossip	Leslie Reynolds (Wembley)	1/1f	28.50	
1953	White City	525y	Daws Dancer	Paddy McEvoy (Private)	10/1	29.20	
1954	White City	525y	Pauls Fun	Leslie Reynolds (Wembley)	8/15f	28.84	
1955	White City	525y	Rushton Mac	Frank Johnson (Private)	5/2	28.97	
1956	White City	525y	Dunmore King	Paddy McEvoy (Clapton)	7/2	29.22	
1957	White City	525y	Ford Spartan	Dennis Hannafin (Wimbledon)	1/1F	28.84	
1958	White City	525y	Pigalle Wonder	Jim Syder Jr. (Wembley)	4/5f	28.65	
1959	White City	525y	Mile Bush Pride	Jack Harvey (Wembley)	1/1f	28.76	
1960	White City	525y	Duleek Dandy	Bill Dash (Private)	25/1	29.15	
1961	White City	525y	Palms Printer	Paddy McEvoy (Clapton)	2/1	28.84	
1962	White City	525y	The Grand Canal	Paddy Dunphy (Ireland)	2/1f	29.09	
1963	White City	525y	Lucky Boy Boy	Johnny Bassett (Clapton)	1/1f	29.00	
1964	White City	525y	Hack Up Chieftain	Percy Stagg (Belle Vue)	20/1	28.82	
1965	White City	525y	Chittering Clapton	Adam Jackson (Clapton)	5/2	28.82	
1966	White City	525y	Faithful Hope	Paddy Keane (Clapton)	8/1	28.52	
1967	White City	525y	Tric Trac	Jim Hookway (Owlerton)	9/2	29.00	
1968	White City	525y	Camira Flash	Randolph Singleton (White City)	100/8	28.78	
1969	White City	525y	Sand Star	Hamilton Orr (Ireland)	5/4f	28.78	
1970	White City	525y	John Silver	Barbara Tompkins (Private)	11/4	29.01	
1971	White City	525y	Dolores Rocket	Herbert White (Private)	11/4	28.74	
1972	White City	525y	Patricias Hope	Adam Jackson (Clapton)	7/1	28.55	
1973	White City	525y	Patricias Hope	Johnny O'Connor (Ireland)	7/2	28.68	
1974	White City	525y	Jimsun	Geoff De Mulder (Hall Green)	5/2	28.76	
1975	White City	500m	Tartan Khan	Gwen Lynds (Bletchley)	25/1	29.57	
1976	White City	500m	Mutts Silver	Phil Rees Sr. (Wimbledon)	6/1	29.38	
1977	White City	500m	Ballinska Band	Eddie Moore (Belle Vue)	1/1f	29.16	
1978	White City	500m	Lacca Champion	Pat Mullins (Private)	6/4f	29.42	
1979	White City	500m	Sarahs Bunny	Geoff De Mulder (Hall Green)	3/1	29.53	
1980	White City	500m	Indian Joe	John Hayes (Ireland)	13/8jf	29.68	
1981	White City	500m	Parkdown Jet	Ger McKenna (Ireland)	4/5f	29.57	
1982	White City	500m	Lauries Panther	Terry Duggan (Romford)	6/4f	29.60	
1983	White City	500m	I'm Slippy	Barbara Tompkins (Coventry)	6/1	29.40	
1984	White City	500m	Whisper Wishes	Charlie Coyle (Maidstone)	7/4f	29.43	
1985	Wimbledon	480m	Pagan Swallow	Philip Rees Jr. (Wimbledon)	9/1	29.04	
1986	Wimbledon	480m	Tico	Arthur Hitch (Slough)	6/4jf	28.69	
1987	Wimbledon	480m	Signal Spark	Gary Baggs (Walthamstow)	14/1	28.83	
1988	Wimbledon	480m	Hit The Lid	John McGee Sr. (Canterbury)	3/1	28.53	
1989	Wimbledon	480m	Lartique Note	Ger McKenna (Ireland)	1/1f	28.79	
1990	Wimbledon	480m	Slippy Blue	Kenny Linzell (Walthamstow)	8/1	28.70	
1991	Wimbledon	480m	Ballinderry Ash	Patsy Byrne (Wimbledon)	5/1	28.78	
1992	Wimbledon	480m	Farloe Melody	Matt O'Donnell (Ireland)	6/4f	28.88	
1993	Wimbledon	480m	Ringa Hustle	Tony Meek (Oxford)	5/2	28.62	
1994	Wimbledon	480m	Moral Standards	Tony Meek (Hall Green)	9/4f	28.59	
1995	Wimbledon	480m	Moaning Lad	Theo Mentzis (Private)	5/2	28.66	
1996	Wimbledon	480m	Shanless Slippy	Dolores Ruth (Ireland)	4/9f	28.66	
1997	Wimbledon	480m	Some Picture	Charlie Lister (Nottingham)	8/13f	28.23	
1998	Wimbledon	480m	Toms The Best	Nick Savva (Milton Keynes)	4/5f	28.75	
1999	Wimbledon	480m	Chart King	Karl & Ralph Hewitt (Ireland)	8/11f	28.76	
2000	Wimbledon	480m	Rapid Ranger	Charlie Lister (Private)	7/4f	28.71	
2001	Wimbledon	480m	Rapid Ranger	Charlie Lister (Private)	7/4	28.71	
2002	Wimbledon	480m	Allen Gift	Claude Gardiner (Hove)	16/1	29.06	
2003	Wimbledon	480m	Farloe Verdict	Charlie Lister (Private)	12/1	28.82	
2004	Wimbledon	480m	Droopys Scholes	Ian Reilly (Ireland)	7/2	28.62	
2005	Wimbledon	480m	Westmead Hawk	Nick Savva (Private)	5/4f	28.56	
2006	Wimbledon	480m	Westmead Hawk	Nick Savva (Private)	4/7f	28.44	
2007	Wimbledon	480m	Westmead Lord	Nick Savva (Private)	6/1	28.47	
2008	Wimbledon	480m	Loyal Honcho	Seamus Graham (Ireland)	5/2jf	28.60	
2009	Wimbledon	480m	Kinda Ready	Mark Wallis (Harlow)	25/1	28.65	
2010	Wimbledon	480m	Bandicoot Tipoki	Charlie Lister (Private)	7/2	28.57	
2011	Wimbledon	480m	Taylors Sky	Charlie Lister (Private)	7/4f	28.17	Track Record
2012	Wimbledon	480m	Blonde Snapper	Mark Wallis (Yarmouth)	8/1	28.65	
2013	Wimbledon	480m	Sidaz Jack	Charlie Lister (Private)	6/1	28.37	
2014	Wimbledon	480m	Salad Dodger	Bruno Berwick (Private)	16/1	28.38	
2015	Wimbledon	480m	Rio Quattro	Danny Riordan (Harlow)	5/1	28.24	
2016	Wimbledon	480m	Jaytee Jet	Paul Hennessy (Ireland)	15/8f	28.22	
2017	Towcester	500m	Astute Missile	Seamus Cahill (Hove)	28/1	28.92	
2018	Towcester	500m	Dorotas Wildcat	Kevin Hutton (Towcester)	2/1	28.85	
2019	Nottingham	500m	Priceless Blake	Paul Hennessy (Ireland)	6/1	29.32	
2020	Nottingham	500m	Deerjet Sydney	Pat Buckley (Ireland)	11/4	29.38	
2021	Towcester	500m	Thorn Falcon	Patrick Janssens (Towcester)	7/2	29.06	
2022	Towcester	500m	Romeo Magico	Graham Holland (Ireland)	5/2	28.95	
2023	Towcester	500m	Gaytime Nemo	Graham Holland (Ireland)	9/1	28.89	
2024	Towcester	500m	De Lahdedah	Liam Dowling (Ireland)	5/1	28.58	Track record
2025	Towcester	500m	Droopys Plunge	Patrick Janssens (Towcester)	10/1	28.76	
2026	Towcester	500m	Lennies Eddie	Paul Hennessy (Ireland)	10/1	28.20	
