= 2002 English Greyhound Derby =

Sporting event

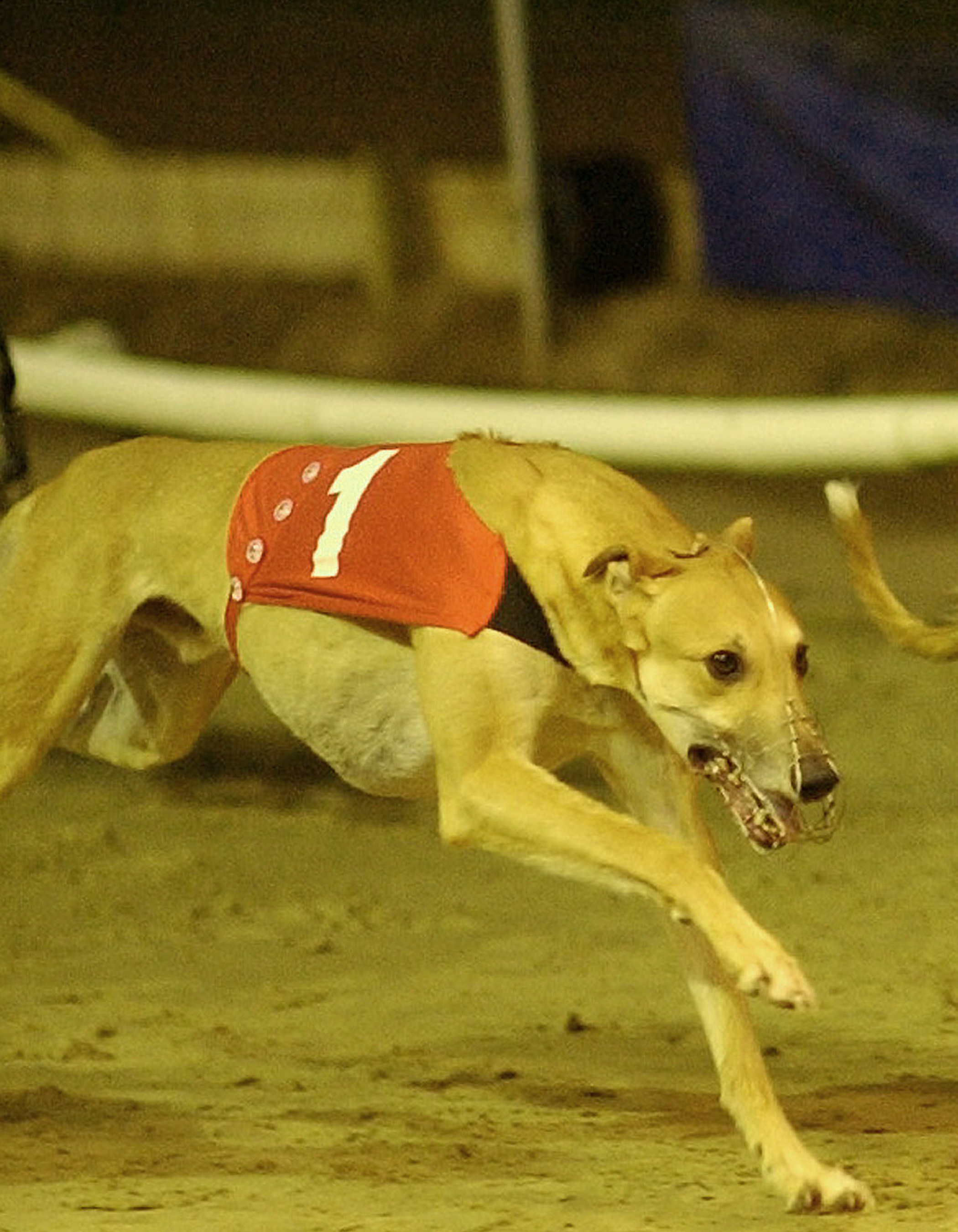
- Windgap Java
- Location: Wimbledon Stadium
- End date: 1 June
- Total prize money: £75,000 (winner)

The 2002 William Hill Greyhound Derby took place during May and June with the final being held on 1 June 2002 at Wimbledon Stadium. The winner received £75,000.

== Competition report ==
There were 173 entries for the 2002 Derby but one of the Britain's leading greyhounds Top Savings was lame and would miss the event, he had been quoted as a short 4-1 ante post favourite. Despite the loss of Top Savings trainer Charlie Lister and owner Ray White had brought Rapid Ranger out of retirement for an unprecedented third title attempt. The ante-post favourite was El Ronan at 12-1 followed by the Scottish Greyhound Derby first and second, Priceless Rebel and Santovita. In addition to Priceless Rebel trainer Paul Hennessy also sent over Irish Puppy Derby champion Rutland Budgie.

First round eliminations included Eclipse champion Bold Mossy and Rutland Budgie but Rapid Ranger won 22 and Santovita went fastest winning in 28.77 and entering the second round as the new favourite. The second round saw Rapid Ranger edge through after finishing third in his heat. Surprise eliminations included Santovita at odds of 1-4f, Vancouver Jet, Willie Go Fa, Occhi Gialli and Knockeevan King.

A third round heat contained Rapid Ranger, Priceless Rebel and Droopys Corleone and as the field rounded the second bend Priceless Rebel clipped the heels of the leader Rapid Ranger and fell impeding Rapid Ranger at the same time. Both were unfortunately knocked out and Rapid Ranger was retired to stud for a second time. In the quarter-finals Droopys Corleone was victorious in 28.84 with Star Ambition, Blue Gooner and Pilot Alert taking the other three heats. Seskin Robert found trouble and went out.

The first semi-final resulted in Crack Him Out beating Pilot Alert and Call Me Baby and in the second Pall Mall Stakes champion Windgap Java defeated Allen Gift and Blue Gooner. Droopys Corleone failed to make the final after finishing fourth.

Rank outsider Allen Gift led all the way in the final challenged by call Me Baby from the third bend. Blue Gooner showed early pace and Crack Him Out moved wide at the first bend ending the chances of Pilot Alert and Windgap Java.

== Quarter finals ==
Heat 1 (May 21)
Pos	Name	SP	Time
1st	Star Ambition	7-4f	29.17
2nd	Magna Mint	9-4	29.37
3rd	Lockup Firedice	4-1	29.51
4th	Brother Jo	8-1	29.52
5th	Larkhill Lo	5-1	29.64
N/R	Ballydaly Score		

Heat 2 (May 21)
Pos	Name	SP	Time
1st	Droopys Corleone	1-1f	28.84
2nd	Allen Gift	10-1	29.34
3rd	Frisby Forte	5-2	29.36
4th	Bright Smile	50-1	29.58
5th	Leam Chabang	25-1	29.64
6th	Blonde Countess	4-1	29.65

Heat 3 (May 21)
Pos	Name	SP	Time
1st	Blue Gooner	4-1	29.21
2nd	Windgap Java	4-1	29.27
3rd	Call Me Baby	12-1	29.29
4th	Santa Donato	7-1	29.35
5th	Seskin Robert	11-10f	29.39
6th	Fionntra Seano	8-1	29.69

Heat 4 (May 21)
Pos	Name	SP	Time
1st	Pilot Alert	3-1cf	29.03
2nd	Crack Him Out	3-1cf	29.19
3rd	Brosna Mustang	5-1	29.21
4th	Hollinwood Chief	6-1	29.31
5th	Texan Fox	8-1	29.71
6th	Fast Fit Spikita	3-1cf	30.23

== Semi finals ==
First Semi-final (May 25)
Pos	Name of Greyhound	SP	Time	Trainer
1st	Crack Him Out	6-1	28.86	Clemenson
2nd	Pilot Alert	7-4jf	29.12	Gibson
3rd	Call Me Baby	8-1	29.16	Cahill
4th	Magna Mint	7-1	29.26	Draper
5th	Lockup Firedice	14-1	29.30	Mullins J
6th	Star Ambition	7-4jf	29.56	Hurley

Second Semi-final (May 25)
Pos	Name of Greyhound	SP	Time	Trainer
1st	Windgap Java	12-1	29.30	Miller
2nd	Allen Gift	16-1	29.32	Gardiner
3rd	Blue Gooner	5-1	29.35	Clemenson
4th	Droopys Corleone	1-1f	29.43	Riordan
5th	Brosna Mustang	10-1	29.51	
6th	Frisby Forte	9-2	29.57	Soppitt

== Final result ==
At Wimbledon (over 480 metres):

Position	Name of Greyhound	Breeding	Trap	Sectional	SP	Time	Trainer
1st	Allen Gift	In Question- Raceline Claire	5	5.18	16-1	29.04	Claude Gardiner (Hove)
2nd	Call Me Baby	Popov - Masonbrook Annie	6	5.24	8-1	29.10	Seamus Cahill (Wimbledon)
3rd	Crack Him Out	Crack Off - Gan On Misty	1	5.34	9-4	29.19	Brian Clemenson (Hove)
4th	Blue Gooner	Staplers Jo - Code Dancer	4	5.21	5-1	29.25	Brian Clemenson (Hove)
5th	Pilot Alert	Roanokee - Mystical Memory	3	5.31	2-1f	29.40	Jimmy Gibson (Belle Vue)
6th	Windgap Java	Lassa Java - Dysart Turnover	2	5.32	5-1	29.46	Cheryl Miller (Sittingbourne)

=== Distances ===
¾, 1, ¾, 2, ¾ (lengths)
The distances between the greyhounds are in finishing order and shown in lengths. One length is equal to 0.08 of one second.

== See also ==
- 2002 UK & Ireland Greyhound Racing Year
