= Wimbledon Stadium =

Former greyhound racing track in London, England

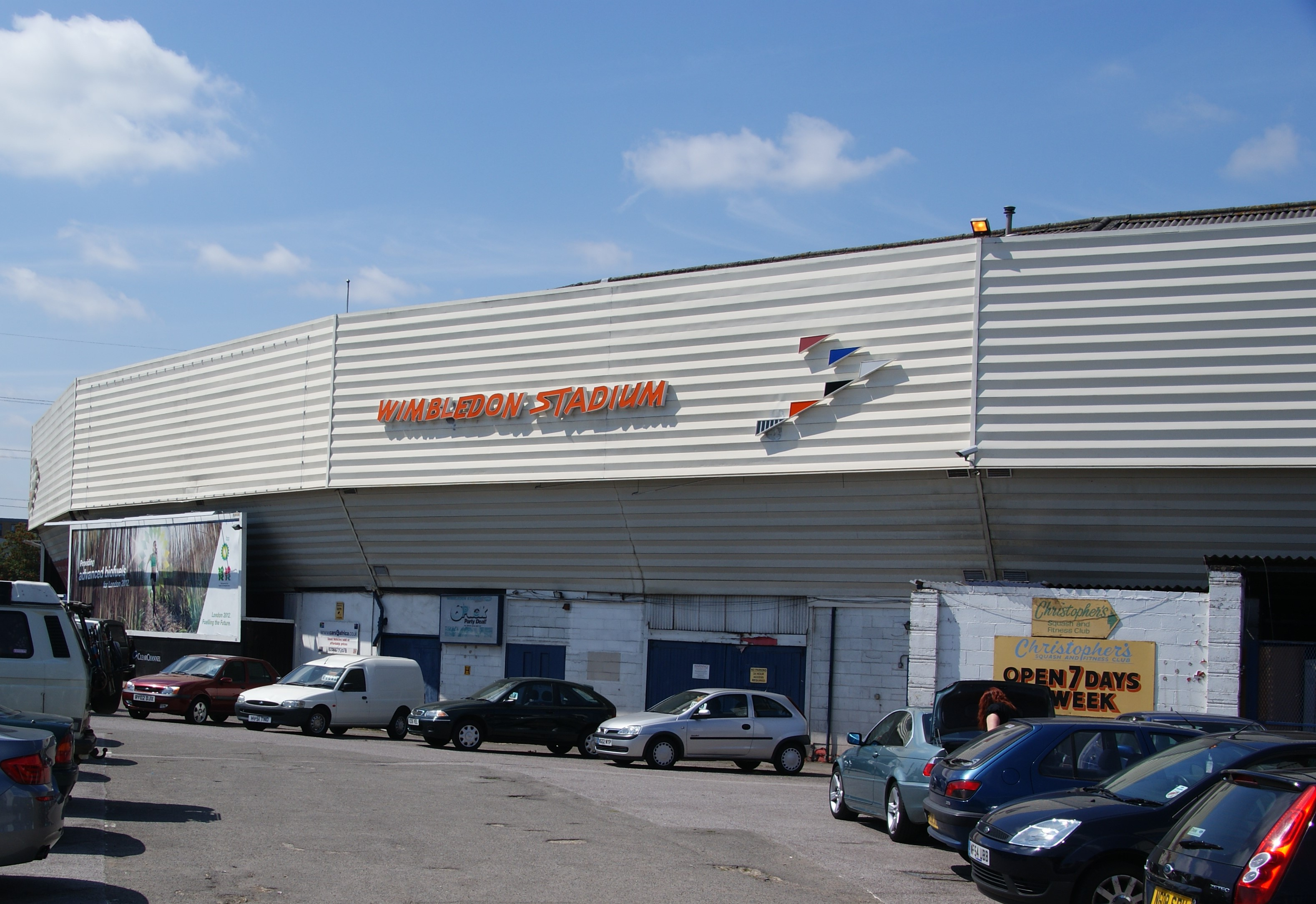
- Interactive map of Wimbledon Stadium
- Full name: Wimbledon Greyhound Stadium
- Location: Plough Lane, Wimbledon, London SW17 0BL, England
- Coordinates: 51°25′52.91″N 0°11′12.01″W

Construction
- Opened: 19 May 1928; 98 years ago
- Renovated: 1950s
- Closed: 25 March 2017; 9 years ago
- Demolished: 16 March 2018; 8 years ago

Wimbledon Stadium, also known as Wimbledon Greyhound Stadium, was a greyhound racing track located in Wimbledon in southwest London, England.

It also hosted stock car and other small circuit motor racing events, and until 2005 hosted motorcycle speedway. The stadium hosted the English Greyhound Derby every year between 1985 and 2016.

Facing declining attendances and with no renovations undertaken for many years, the stadium was put up for sale by the owners, the Greyhound Racing Association, and closed permanently in March 2017. The site was purchased by Galliard Homes Limited, in order to build 600 new apartments and a new football stadium, the new Plough Lane, for AFC Wimbledon. The stadium was demolished in 2018 to clear the site for the new development; it was one of London's last remaining greyhound stadia, leaving only Crayford and Romford remaining at the time of its closure, and was the third to close since the year 2000 after Catford in 2003 and Walthamstow in 2008.

== Facilities ==
The facilities originally included a brick-fronted grandstand, seating 8,000, executive suites, several bars, and catering facilities, including a large waiter-service restaurant. The stadium was surrounded by a large open-air car park, which hosted car-boot sales on Saturdays and Sundays for many years.

== Greyhound racing ==
=== Origins ===
The greyhound stadium was constructed east of the River Wandle on a section of marshland which was difficult to build on and was prone to flooding. The only buildings nearby were a chamois leather mill, a large sewage works, and the Plough public house. Slightly to the east was Summerstown Road, which held the only housing in the immediate area.

The difficult plot did not deter South London Greyhound Racecourses Ltd., who went ahead with plans to build a large stadium ready for 1928. However, financial difficulties halted the project until a consortium headed by Bill 'WJ' Cearns, whose firm had been responsible for the construction of the stadium, stepped in with sufficient funds to save the project.

=== Opening ===
The first race on opening night, 19 May 1928, was won by a greyhound named Ballindura trained by Harry Leader. The Burhill kennels in Walton-on-Thames became renowned within the industry for housing the hounds for Wimbledon, and were used by trainers Stan Biss, Harry Leader and Ken Appleton. Paddy McEllistrim, a Norfolk farmer and breeder of greyhounds, and Sidney Orton, joined the training kennels soon after.

=== 1928–1939 ===
Wimbledon was the first track to introduce weighing scales in 1929 at their kennels, so that the racing public could be issued with the greyhounds' weights before racing. The same year, Harry Leader returned to Ireland and was replaced by Sidney Orton. New events named the Puppy Derby, International, Wimbledon Gold Cup and Wimbledon Spring Stakes were all inaugurated.

In December 1929, Arundel Kempton purchased Mick the Miller for £2,000 as a present for his wife, and placed him with Sidney Orton. The track had already been associated with Mick the Miller because the champion took up residence at the kennels of Paddy McEllistrim during the duration of the 1929 English Greyhound Derby. Con Stevens was the first Racing Manager and was instrumental in bringing the first classic race to Wimbledon in the form of the Laurels in 1930. Mick the Miller claimed his second Derby crown in 1930, propelling himself, the sport, and Wimbledon into national fame.

In 1931, Paddy McEllistrim's head man Dan Costello gained a trainer position at the track and would later train Wimbledon's second Grand National winner in Lemonition (1934).

Trainer Joe Harmon arrived from White City in 1934, and Paddy Fortune, another new trainer at Wimbledon, claimed a second Derby victory for the track in 1939, with greyhound Highland Rum. The 'Two Year Old Produce Stakes' was introduced in 1935, and another event named 'The Key' began in 1936.

=== 1940s ===
During World War II the stadium suffered bomb damage but continued to operate. The well-known Irish dog Tanist was put with Paddy McEllistrim, but found it hard to cope with the sharp turns at Wimbledon, and failed to win a single race by the end of June 1940. By contrast, Ballynennan Moon became a household name during the war years after becoming a Wimbledon greyhound, with Billy Quinn negotiating the sale to Mrs Cearns, wife of the managing director of Wimbledon Stadium. In 1942, after a winter rest, he won the Walthamstow Stakes and Wimbledon Spring Cup, before embarking on forty wins and seven second places from 48 starts. After finishing first fourteen times in succession, he was beaten by a neck by Laughing Lackey, narrowly failing to beat Mick the Miller's 19 straight wins record.

A new puppy named Ballyhennessy Seal first came to the scene in 1943 after moving from Catford Stadium to Wimbledon, and was placed in the care of Stan Martin. Martin had joined the Wimbledon training ranks following the death of Joe Harmon in 1942. Martin guided Ballyhennessy Seal to a third Derby success for the track in 1945.

=== 1950s ===
After the war the Wimbledon management constructed a new grandstand in place of the war damaged section of the stadium. They also introduced new perforated tote tickets following continual losses on forged tote tickets every Saturday to the tune of £1,000. Ballymac Ball was the next greyhound to win the Derby for Wimbledon, the brindle dog winning the 1950 event for Stan Martin. In 1950 the Instaprint photo timer was tested at Wimbledon, and given the seal of approval to use throughout Britain.

Con Stevens continued to manage the stadium throughout the 1950s, overseeing the success of the track. A fifth Derby success came in 1957, after the Dennis Hannafin (brother of Jerry) trained Ford Spartan took the title. In 1958 Paddy Fortune died, and his kennels were taken over by George Waterman. Within a few months, Sidney Orton retired and his son Clare Orton took up his position at Wimbledon, with Clare having been a trainer in his own right for nearly ten years.

=== 1960s ===
Phil Rees Sr. joined the track as a trainer in the 1960s following the retirement of Dennis Hannafin, and the Greyhound Express Merit Puppy Championship was renamed the Juvenile in 1963. George Waterman died, and his Burhill kennel range was given to new trainer Nora Gleeson. The three-time Derby winning trainer Paddy McEvoy also joined the track in the late 1960s. Towards the end of 1969, the possibility of the stadium being redeveloped became a possibility, but the Greyhound Racing Association bought a major stake in Wimbledon after a prolonged battle against developers.

=== 1970s ===
Murmurings about redevelopment remained as GRA Property Trust continued to buy and sell stadiums, but the GRA chose to invest in the stadium, raising the winning prize money levels of the Laurels to £2,000 in 1970 and £5,000 one year later. In 1972, the GRA sealed a deal to buy Wimbledon Stadium outright, and bring the track fully under the GRA banner. Paddy McEllistrim and Stan Martin both retired in 1974, and were replaced by Paddy's daughter Norah, and by Sam Sykes, a former head lad to Clare Orton. Con Stevens resigned from the board of directors at Wimbledon, bringing to an end his 46 years of association with the track.

Wimbledon introduced new technology in 1976 after using a sectional timing mechanism, and were one of the first tracks to use the system of grading (selecting greyhounds in classes on ability). In the same year, Mutts Silver, trained by Phil Rees Snr., won the Derby; Rees handed his kennels to his son Philip Rees Jnr. just two years later after retiring.

=== 1980s ===
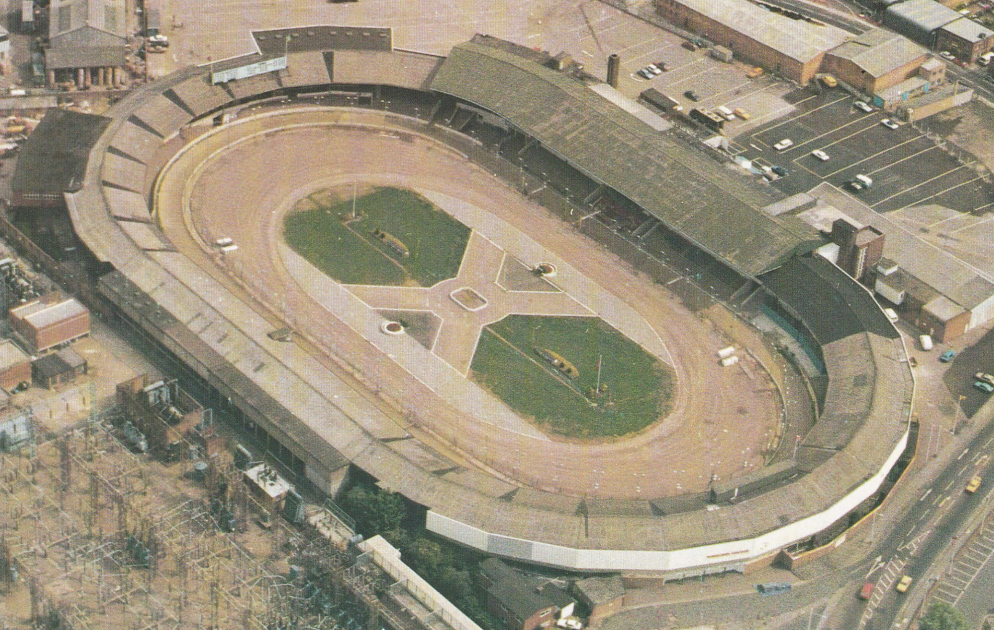
Wimbledon Stadium circa. 1980

Wimbledon was chosen to host the sport's premier event, the 1985 Greyhound Derby, following the closure of White City in 1984. Industry support for Wembley to be given the premier race was inconsequential, since GRA owned the rights to the competition and would not allow a non-GRA track to have the race. Bob Rowe, Chief Racing Manager for the GRA, was Racing Manager at Wimbledon when the track was handed the Derby, and trainers Tom Foster and David Kinchett both joined from White City. The first Derby at Wimbledon was held over a new distance of 480 metres (520 yd), and ended with a seventh success for the track. Pagan Swallow won the competition, and the Rees family became the second father and son to each win the Derby. Arthur Hitch joined the tack in 1987 when Slough Stadium closed, and following the closure of Harringay Stadium the prestigious Oaks for bitches was relocated to Wimbledon.

=== 1990s ===
In 1990 a greyhound called Druids Johno was given to Prince Edward; the half share of the black dog had been given to the Prince by Patsy Byrne during a charity meeting at Kingsmead Stadium, Canterbury. Byrne joined Wimbledon as a trainer in 1991, and sponsored the long-running International in the process. This appointment brought about the last Derby triumph for the track, with Ballinderry Ash taking the 1991 title to bring the total to eight, just one behind Wembley.

In 1992 GRA parent company Wembley PLC announced losses of £8 million, despite a £13 million profit in its UK operation. Simon Harris arrived from Hall Green to become Racing Manager, with Bob Rowe remaining at Wimbledon in his role as Chief Racing Manager of the GRA. 1996 saw the introduction of the Intertrack betting service, which enabled race-goers at other tracks around the country to view racing and place bets directly into the Wimbledon tote. In 1998 the Laurels relocated to sister track Belle Vue Stadium, and a new Paddock Bar extension costing £500,000 opened; the kennels were moved to the first bend to facilitate the change. The next year, Sky Sports screened their first greyhound meeting at Wimbledon, which included the Springbok final. The GRA switched the Grand National to Wimbledon from Hall Green in 1999.

=== 2000–2017 ===
Rapid Ranger completed two Derby successes in 2001, emulating Mick the Miller and Patricias Hope. Seamus Cahill and Bernie Doyle joined Wimbledon from Catford and Reading Stadium respectively in 2002. Catford closed in 2003, resulting in three new trainers, John Simpson, Tony Taylor and John Walsh. Catford Racing Manager Derek Hope took over from the departing Simon Harris, who left for Coventry. In 2003 Wimbledon underwent £70,000 in track improvements, following criticism received during the 2002 Derby. Consequently, the 680 m (740 yd) trip was changed to 688 m (752 yd) and the 868 m (949 yd) was changed to 872 m (954 yd). Trainer Tommy Foster retired in 2004.

Westmead Hawk won the 2005 and 2006 Greyhound Derby, becoming the fourth greyhound to attain two wins. Trainer Ray Peacock died in 2007, with racing Manager Derek Hope leaving to join William Hill, being replaced by Gary Matthews. In 2008 Richard Rees, son of Philip Rees Jnr., became a third-generation trainer at Wimbledon; Philip Rees Jnr retired due to ill health. Tony Morris, who stood as a track bookmaker, also retired after a long career at Wimbledon. In 2010 Wimbledon underwent major changes in time for the Derby; the grandstand was switched to the far side of the stadium, and the physical makeup of the track was altered, meaning new track records would be set. The changes cost around £400,000, which were partly funded by a £195,370 grant from the British Greyhound Racing Fund.

The GRA allowed the Grand National to go to Central Park Stadium in Sittingbourne in 2012, and leading trainer Norah McEllistrim left for Brighton & Hove Greyhound Stadium. Bob Rowe switched to Belle Vue as the Racing Manager, along with the Oaks.

After sharply falling attendances for many years, and with the stadium becoming dilapidated, its closure was announced by the GRA and the final meeting was held on 25 March 2017. This attracted a large crowd, many of whom were turned away due to reduced capacity restrictions, caused by much of the stadium being closed off for public safety. The last ever race was won by Glitzy King, trained by Brian Nicholls, who provided many of the dogs in the final few months of the stadium's existence.

== Speedway ==
Until 2005, the stadium was also home for over 50 years to the now defunct Wimbledon Dons speedway team. It was famous for hosting the Internationale meeting every season from 1962 until 1981, also hosting a qualifying round of this competition in 1961.

Speedway arrived at Wimbledon in the 1928 pioneer season, and a team was entered in the league competitions from 1929 to 1939. The team was re-formed after the war and the Dons raced in the top flight National League Division One from 1946 to 1964. The Dons were multiple winners of the league in the 1950s, and were founding members of the British League in 1965. From 1946, reopening after the war, average weekly attendances were in excess of 30,000, until the early 1950s, when the sport declined rapidly in popularity. However, Wimbledon remained one of the top teams, with healthy crowd figures, and upon the closure of Wembley in 1956 were the only team in London (excluding sporadic appearances by New Cross in 1959/1960 and 1963) until 1963 when Hackney entered the Provincial League, and 1964 when West Ham reopened in the National League (now known as the 1st Division Elite League).

Wimbledon's tenure in the top flight came to an end in the 1980s and the Greyhound Racing Association, the owners of the stadium at the time, decreed that speedway would end at the end of the 1986 season. However, David Pickles, a London stockbroker, gathered together a consortium in the 1986/87 close season that ensured that the Dons would continue to run. They employed the ex-England team manager John Berry, and enjoyed reasonable success on and off the track in their first season. After a disagreement with Berry and the other members of the board, Pickles dramatically resigned as chairman of the club during the match with Exeter in September 1987, selling his shares back to the other members. With a few reshuffles at board level and the leaving of Berry, the remaining members eventually took Wimbledon back to the British League Division One in 1991, but the move proved disastrous and with only a couple of months of the season having been ridden, the financial losses proved to be so great that they were forced to disband the team. In June 1991 Wimbledon rode their final meeting, which was eventually curtailed due to the weather. Although there was no longer any league racing at the Plough Lane stadium, the team continued their league fixtures for the 1991 season, moving to Eastbourne, and were known during this period as the Eastbourne Dons.

Having been defunct for eleven years, the team were then reopened again at Wimbledon Stadium in 2002, but were finally disbanded completely in 2005 as a result of a dispute between the team's promoters and the owners of the stadium, over a proposed large rent increase.

== Stock car racing ==
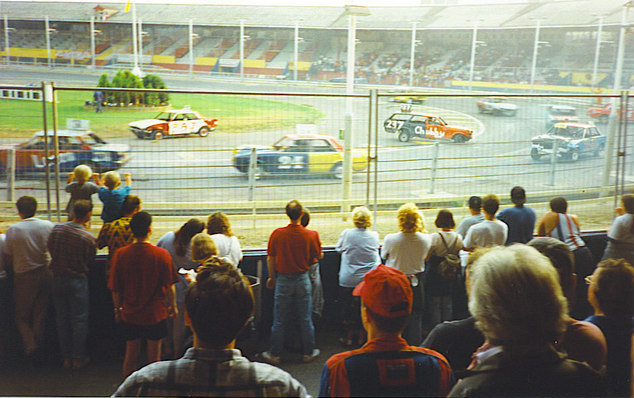
A Stock Car meeting at Wimbledon Stadium

Plough Lane also hosted Motor Racing events promoted by Spedeworth International, including Superstox, Stock Cars, Hot Rods and Bangers. The first stock car meeting at Wimbledon was on 29 September 1962 (the Superstox World Championship), and the circuit quickly became Spedeworth's flagship venue, with the World Final being held there every year up to and including 1974. The World Championship, along with other key race meetings such as Carnival Night, became very popular and were often 'ticket only' events filled to capacity. The stadium also boasted its own stock car racing teams in 1966 (London Sparrows) and 1971-72 (Canaries/Dons). The 1966 team shared its base with New Cross Stadium. The Unlimited Banger World Final also used to take place at Wimbledon until the event moved to Foxhall Stadium in 2008, citing the introduction of the London low emission zone as making it too expensive for the transporters to travel to the venue.

== Other notable events ==
Wimbledon Stadium was the scene for part of the music video for the 1978 Queen song "Bicycle Race", in which 65 professional female models rode on bicycles (nude/partially-clothed) around the stadium.

Banger racing at the stadium was featured in episode 12, series 1 of the 1970s ITV police series The Sweeney, named "Contact Breaker".

== Closure and demolition ==
In 2007 the stadium was purchased by development company Galliard Homes, when the Greyhound Racing Association was put up for sale (along with all of its assets) by parent company Wembley PLC. Following this, local professional football team AFC Wimbledon expressed interest in building their new football stadium on the site of the greyhound track. A joint planning application made by Galliard Homes and AFC Wimbledon to build the new football stadium, together with 600 residences, on the site of the greyhound stadium was approved by the London Borough of Merton in December 2015 despite the plans being in contravention of the "London Plan". Attempts to prevent the closure of the stadium failed; a £20 million rival planning bid to build a new greyhound stadium, submitted by Irish businessman Paschal Taggart, owner of Dublin’s Shelbourne Park Greyhound Stadium, and a bid by pressure group 'Save Wimbledon Stadium Action Group' to have the stadium granted listed status by Historic England both came to nothing. The stadium finally closed to the public on 25 March 2017, and demolition of the stadium and associated buildings commenced on 16 March 2018.

== Competitions ==
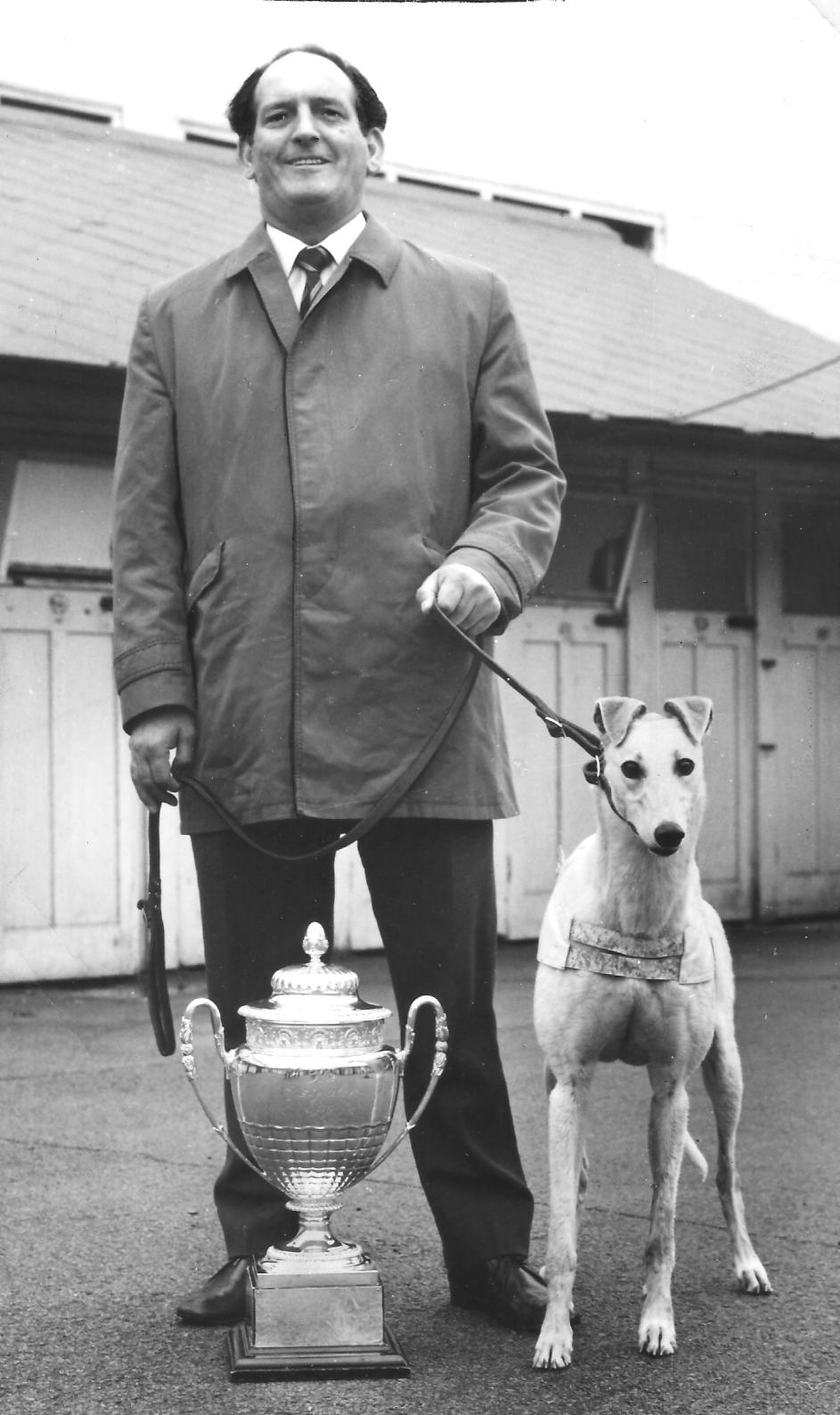
1972 Wimbledon Spring Cup champion Puff Pastry with owner Mr R. White

Wimbledon hosted the following competitions throughout its history.

The Derby

St Leger

Grand National

Laurels

Oaks

Puppy Derby

Juvenile

Champion Hurdle

Cearns Invitation

Champion Stakes

Derby Consolation/Invitation

The International

The Key

The Key was a competition held from 1936 over the stayers distance and then the marathon distance.

Year	Winner	Trainer	Time	SP
1936	Book Reporter	Joe Harmon (Wimbledon)	40.80	
1937	Brave Queen	Stanley Biss (West Ham)	40.70	
1938	Sally Maid	A Rees (Private)	41.04	
1939	Ballydancer	Sidney Orton (Wimbledon)	41.42	6–4jf
1940	Keel Border	Joe Harmon (Wimbledon)	41.20	6–1
1941	Rahinisky Champion	Paddy Fortune (Wimbledon)	40.81	2–1f
1942	Wallace C	Stan Martin (Wimbledon)	41.63	6–1
1943	Merry Two Star	M Barnett (Private)	41.03	5–2
1944	Model Dasher	Tom Baldwin (Perry Barr)	42.17	8–13f
1945	Robeen Printer	George McKay (Coventry)	41.53	8–11f
1946	Maggie Sally	D Hayes (Coventry)	42.06	5–1
1947	Ben Silver	Stanley Biss (Clapton)	42.39	5–4f
1948	Baytown Flash	Stanley Biss (Clapton)	42.20	8–15f
1949	Drastic O'Leer	W Major (Private)	42.59	13–8f
1950	Sheevaun	Paddy Fortune (Wimbledon)	42.00	8–1
1951	Rapid Choice	Paddy McEvoy (Private)	41.55	4–11f
1952	Careless Hands	Jimmy Quinn (Eastville)	42.06	5–1
1953	Magourna Reject	Tom Paddy Reilly (Walthamstow)	41.49	1–2f
1954	Mottram Hero	Leslie Reynolds (Wembley)	41.76	11–2
1956	Spark Prince	Paddy Fortune (Wimbledon)	42.13	9–4
1957	Highway Tim	Mrs Rosalie Beba (Private)	40.21	4–5f
1958	Budget Surplus	Wilf France Harringay)	55.05	11–10f
1959	The Lure of the Turf	Phil Rees Sr. (Private)	55.35	5–1
1960	Lemon Chip	Phil Rees Sr. (Private)	55.46	40–1
1961	Pine Blacktop	Noreen Collin (Private)	55.11	
1962	What Cheer	Frank Conlon (Private)	54.93	
1963	Miss Elegant	Paddy Keane (Private)	54.96	
1964	Carmen Star	Mrs E Eade (Private)	55.18	2–5f
1966	I'm Speedy	Jimmy Jowett (Clapton)	54.82	
1967	Miss Taft	Bob Burls (Wembley)	54.78	
1968	Greenville Fauna	Paddy McEvoy (Wimbledon)	54.54	
1969	Ballycairn	John Coleman (Romford)	55.24	7–1
1970	Swift Silver	Arthur Hancock (Brighton)	55.05	1–1f
1971	Swift Silver	Arthur Hancock (Brighton)	54.88	
1972	Iver Flash	George Curtis (Brighton)	54.67	8–13f
1973	Country Maiden	Frank Baldwin (Perry Barr)	55.67	3–1
1974	Leading Pride	George Curtis (Brighton)	54.49	
1975	Mondays Style		55.68	9–2
1976	Sindys Flame	John Honeysett (Private)	54.54	7–1
1977	Moonlight Mod	Nora Gleeson (Wimbledon)	54.34	4–1
1978	Langford Dacoit	George Curtis (Brighton)	54.25	
1979	Portland Dusty	Frank Melville Harringay)	55.30	
1980	Salina	George Lang (Rye House)	55.15	4–5f
1981	Regal Girl	George Lang (Rye House)	55.38	1–3f
1982	Nails United	A Smith (Private)	55.06	5–2
1983	Sandy Lane	George Curtis (Brighton)	54.41	1–2f
1984	Sandy Lane	George Curtis (Brighton)	54.90	1–7f
1985	Miss Linsey	Kenny Linzell (Walthamstow)	54.70	5–2jf
1986	Yankees Shadow	George Curtis (Brighton)	55.07	1–5f
1987	Denes Mutt	Fred Wiseman (Private)	54.46	4–7f
1988	Cloverhill June	Terry Kibble (Bristol)	55.19	7–4
1989	Xpert Heroine	Sam Sykes (Wimbledon)	55.46	13–8
1990	Ivory Lamb	Hazel Dickson (Wembley)	54.87	1–4f
1992	Hopton Chilli	Graham Sharp (Walthamstow)	54.84	5–1
1993	Killenagh Dream	Charlie Lister (Private)	54.69	1–1f
1994	Smart Decision	Ernie Gaskin Sr. (Walthamstow)	55.39	11–10f

1936–1957 (725 yards), 1936–1975 (940 yards), 1975–1994 (868 metres)

Wimbledon Gold Cup

The Wimbledon Gold Cup was a competition held from 1929 originally over hurdles and later the stayers distance.

Year	Winner	Trainer	Time	SP
1929	Honeymans Last		29.76	
1930	Firework		29.81	
1931	Smart Fashion	Paddy McEllistrim (Wimbledon)	29.75	
1932	Lock Audacity	Jerry Hannafin (Wimbledon)	31.09	10–1
1933	Bronze Dragon		29.87	
1934	March On		29.27	
1935	Kilganny Bridge	PJ Higgins (Clapton)	29.46	
1936	Wild Storm	Les Parry (White City)	29.37	6–4
1937	Terrys Hope	F Rolfe (Private)	29.23	4–1
1938	Lenins Ring	Joe Harmon (Wimbledon)	29.18	9–4
1939	Printer	Paddy McEllistrim (Wimbledon)	29.22	1–1f
1940	Captain Moonlight	Archie Whitcher (Catford)	29.71	100–8
1941	Dangerous Rally	Harry Buck (White City)	30.03	100–8
1942	Winterhead Big	Sidney Orton (Wimbledon)	30.05	8–1
1943	Gypsy Win	W Franks (Eastville)	29.58	4–5f
1944	Gypsy Win	Sidney Orton (Wimbledon)	29.17	5–4
1945	Derryboy Jubilee	Stan Biss (Clapton)	29.33	
1946	Red Nuxer	Robert Linney (Catford)	28.94	9–4
1947	Scoff That	Jack Cooper Harringay)	29.43	9–2
1948	Listoke Invader	Stan Martin (Wimbledon)	29.40	5–2
1949	Sprightly Peter	Paddy McEllistrim (Wimbledon)	29.39	4–5f
1950	Blossom of Annagura	Jack Sherry (Ramsgate)	29.24	7–1
1951	Devil O'Leer	Norman Merchant (Private)	29.05	6–1
1952	Spanish Rosetree	Jerry Hannafin (Wimbledon)	29.16	5–1
1953	Spanish Rosetree	Jerry Hannafin (Wimbledon)	28.96	5–2
1954	Oriel Idol	Dal Hawkesley (West Ham)	29.51	2–1
1955	Roguish Shaggy	Peter Hawkesley (Romford)	29.30	100–30
1956	Vintners Cup	Sidney Orton (Wimbledon)	29.16	2–1jf
1957	Glacier Metal	Paddy Fortune (Wimbledon)	29.19	8–1
1958	Fodda Champion	Jimmy Jowett (Clapton)	28.83	4–5f
1959	Khaffra	F.Hedley (Hackney)	29.12	5–2
1960	Change That	Jack Harvey (Wembley)	28.75	8–11f
1961	Ballinatona Special	Stan Martin (Wimbledon)	28.37	
1962	Pigalle The Great	Jimmy Clubb (Private)	29.47	
1963	Mood Indigo II	Paddy McEllistrim (Wimbledon)	29.21	
1964	Fairyfield Surprise	G Jackson (Private)	28.91	7–4f
1965	Lisnalong Hero	Paddy McEllistrim (Wimbledon)	28.74	
1966	Charlie Caesar	Stan Martin (Wimbledon)	29.13	
1967	No Chips	Paddy McEvoy (Wimbledon)	29.12	
1968	Super Fame	Norah Gleeson (Wimbledon)	29.47	
1969	Colonels Rib	Joe Pickering (White City)	29.19	4–1
1970	Peaceful Home	Clare Orton (Wimbledon)	28.99	5–1
1971	Sherrys Prince	Colin West (West Ham)	28.83	
1972	Derry Palm	Phil Rees Sr. (Wimbledon)	29.33	3–1
1973	Crimsons Grove	Nora Gleeson (Wimbledon)	29.13	
1974	Gurteen Prince		29.55	
1975	Bansha Pride	Phil Rees Sr. (Wimbledon)	28.24	
1976	Try It Blackie	Frank Melville Harringay)	28.67	3–1
1977	Belated Silver	Sam Sykes (Wimbledon)	28.35	6–4f
1978	Moreen Penguin	Bette Godwin (Wimbledon)	29.11	
1979	Toms Chance	Joe Pickering (White City)	29.06	
1980	Cladagh Colina		29.65	
1981	Westmead Prince	Natalie Savva (Private)	28.34	4–1
1982	Westlands Bridge	Gunner Smith (Brighton)	28.19	
1983	Pagan Pansy	Ted Dickson (Wembley)		
1986	Lone Wolf	George Curtis (Brighton)		1–2f
1990	Trans Mercedes	Maldwyn Thomas (Reading)	41.08	1–4f
1991	Anglers Pride	Sam Sykes (Wimbledon)	40.73	5–1
1992	Westmead Surprise	Nick Savva (Milton Keynes)	40.40	5–2
1993	Squire Delta	John Coleman (Walthamstow)	40.41	1–1f
1994	Island Doe	Derek Knight (Hove)	40.59	6–4f
1995	Argos Chief	Tommy Foster (Wimbledon)	40.50	2–1
1999	Spenwood Wizard	Ron Hough (Sheffield)	54.99	1–2f

1936–1975 (500 yards hurdles), 1975–1982 (460 metres hurdles), 1986–1994 (660 metres)

Wimbledon Spring Cup

The Wimbledon Spring Cup also known as the Spring Stakes was a competition held from 1929 the standard distance and later the stayers distance.

Year	Winner	Trainer	Time	SP
1929	Elm Branch		29.08	
1930	Brisbane	Sidney Orton (Wimbledon)	29.48	
1931	Rory of the Hill		29.33	
1932	Altamatzin	Arthur Doc Callanan (Wembley)	28.99	9–4
1933	Wild Woolley	Jack Rimmer (White City, Man)	29.61	
1934	Happy Form		29.78	
1935	Curleys Fancy II	Jerry Hannafin (Wimbledon)	28.37	
1936	Mitzvah	Arthur Doc Callanan (Wembley)	29.56	11–8f
1937	Shandy Gaff	Sidney Orton (Wimbledon)	29.18	2–1
1938	Lone Keel	Sydney Wright (Private)	28.48	7–4jf
1939	Ivyhouse Champion		28.97	
1940	Selsey Cutlet	Leslie Reynolds (Wembley)	28.57	5–1
1941	Lights O'London	Joe Harmon (Wimbledon)	29.37	2–5f
1942	Ballynennan Moon	Sidney Orton (Wimbledon)	29.05	5-6f
1943	Farloe Best	Mrs R McKay (Coventry)	28.86	5–1
1944	Jazzer Smith		28.05	
1945	Fair Marquis	Sidney Orton (Wimbledon)	28.67	8–1
1946	Fair and Handsome	Bill Cowell (Coventry)	28.99	6–1
1948	Don Gipsey	Leslie Reynolds (Wembley)	28.79	2–1
1949	Olives Ivy	Paddy Fortune (Wimbledon)	28.51	4–1
1950	Ballymac Ball	Stan Martin (Wimbledon)	27.97	1–6f
1951	Magna Hasty	Stan Martin (Wimbledon)	29.08	5–2
1952	Ryton Basher	Stan Martin (Wimbledon)	28.15	2–1
1953	Home Luck	Stan Martin (Wimbledon)	28.12	8–11f
1954	Small Town	Leslie Reynolds (Wembley)	28.58	2–1
1955	Imperial Fawn	George Crussell (Private)	28.86	10–1
1956	The Grey Goose	Stan Martin (Wimbledon)	28.42	5–4f
1957	Highway Sue	Sidney Orton (Wimbledon)	28.31	5-2jf
1958	Beware Champ	Paddy Fortune (Wimbledon)	28.46	1–2f
1959	Firgrove Snowman	Ted Brennan (Owlerton)	28.62	7–2
1960	Mink Muff	Joe De Mulder (Private)	40.01	11–10f
1961	Just Sherry	Phil Rees Sr. (Private)	40.50	
1962	Watch Kern	Tony Dennis (Private)	40.50	
1963	Hi Rebel	Dennis Hannafin (Wimbledon)	41.01	
1964	Lucky Hi There	Jimmy Jowett (Clapton)	40.38	11–8f
1965	Westpark Quail	Noreen Collin (Private)	40.59	
1966	Miss Taft	Bob Burls (Wembley)	40.25	
1967	Hampton Lad	Paddy McEvoy (Wimbledon)	40.98	
1968	Cullen Era	Clare Orton (Wimbledon)	39.72	4–9f
1969	Shanes Rocket	Paddy Milligan (Private)	41.24	3–1
1970	Shady Antionette	Norman Oliver (Brough Park)	40.31	2–1
1971	Dolores Rocket	Herbert White (Private)	39.66	
1972	Puff Pastry	Sid Ryall (Private)	40.80	7–4
1973	Starline Lady	Geoff De Mulder (Hall Green)	40.21	2–1f
1974	Cowboy Jo	Mick Hawkins (Private)	41.16	10–3
1975	Glin Bridge	George Curtis (Brighton)	42.07	
1976	Drynham Star	Natalie Savva (Bletchley)	40.18	7–4
1977	Oaken Lad	Paddy Coughlan (Crayford)	41.82	8–1
1978	Sindys Prospect	Paddy Coughlan (Crayford)	41.48	
1979	Owners Guide	Tony Jowett (Slough)	42.59	
1980	Little Lamb		40.95	
1981	Nails Tails	Charlie Coyle (Private)	41.38	2–1
1982	Auburn Jet	Paddy Coughlan (Crayford)	41.57	7–2
1983	Tangled Threads			
1984	Fergus Rock	Ray Peacock Harringay)		
1985	Lady Opinion	Philip Rees Jr. (Wimbledon)		
1986	Kalamity Kelly	Gunner Smith (Brighton)	40.89	
1987	Lone Wolf	George Curtis (Brighton)		
1988	Ohteevee	Ted Dickson (Wembley)		
1989	Silver Chance	John Honeysett (Wembley)		
1990	Crohane Lucy	Tony Lucas (Portsmouth)	40.56	1–1f
1991	Kaszenas Lad	John McGee Sr. (Peterborough)	41.60	9–4
1992	Gold Splash	Philip Rees Jr. (Wimbledon)	41.06	10–1
1993	Regent Lass	Philip Rees Jr. (Wimbledon)	41.05	9–2
1994	Phantom Rose	Philip Rees Jr. (Wimbledon)	40.84	10–1

1929–1959 (500 yards), 1936–1975 (700 yards), 1975–1994 (660 metres)

Two-Year Old Produce Stakes

The Wimbledon Two-Year Old Produce Stakes was a competition held from 1935 until 1974. In 1974 the track announced that the race would end blaming changing ties and increased expenses.

Year	Winner	Trainer	Time	SP
1935	Maidens Delight	Jim Syder Sr. (Wembley)		
1936	Melksham Lassie	Joe Harmon (Wimbledon)	28.73	7–4f
1937	Golden Alexander	Jimmy Campbell (White City)	28.35	3–1
1938	Junior Classic	Joe Harmon (Wimbledon)	28.43	8–11f
1939	Jungle Conquest	Joe Harmon (Wimbledon)	28.53	8–1
1940	Rock Callan	Joe Harmon (Wimbledon)	28.81	6-4f
1941	Grosvenor Flexion	Joe Harmon (Wimbledon)	28.72	5–1
1942	Laughing Lieutenant	Bert Heyes (White City)	29.18	6–4
1943	Lord O’the Limelight	Stan Martin (Wimbledon)	28.73	100-30
1944	Cockeyed Cutlet	Jimmy Campbell Harringay)	28.40	7–1
1945	Newtown Defender	Paddy Fortune (Wimbledon)	28.12	10–11f
1946	Westbury Sammy	Jerry Hannafin (Wimbledon)	28.34	4–1
1947	Rio Cepretta	Stan Biss (Clapton)	28.32	11–10f
1948	Good Worker	Jack Daley (Ramsgate)	28.85	6–4f
1949	Huntlawrigg	Jerry Hannafin (Wimbledon)	28.30	5–4f
1950	Kismet D	Fred Trevillion (Private)	28.46	8–11f
1951	Ilford Boy	Paddy McEllistrim (Wimbledon)	28.35	3–1
1952	Marazion Michael	Paddy Fortune (Wimbledon)	28.34	100–8
1953	Home Luck	Stan Martin (Wimbledon)	28.30	1–8f
1954	Record Coup	Paddy McEvoy (Private)	28.70	1–1f
1955	Broadway Darkie II	Pam Heasman (Private)	28.27	4–1
1956	Dunmore King	Paddy McEvoy (Clapton)	28.08	4–5f
1957	Town Prince	Leslie Reynolds (Wembley)	28.23	1–2f
1958	Gypsy Boy	Bob Burls (Wembley)	28.47	4–1
1959	Eden Gate	Leslie Reynolds (Wembley)	28.11	7–2
1960	Laird O'The Glen	Paddy McEllistrim (Wimbledon)	27.94	2–1f
1961	S.S. Leader	Jim Hookway (Owlerton)	28.13	
1962	Pride of Pillar	Stan Mitchell (Private)	28.24	
1963	Tripaway	Vivien Pateman (Private)	28.17	
1964	Flintstone	Ted Brennan (Owlerton)	28.26	9–4
1965	Marshbank Lion	Stan Martin (Wimbledon)	28.25	
1966	Morden Mist	W.English (Private)	28.09	
1967	Warfield Flash	Len Drewery (Private)	28.04	
1968	Petrovitch	Jack Harvey (Wembley)	28.10	
1969	Lion Laddie	Arthur Hancock (Brighton)	28.23	100–8
1970	Kasama Lad	Gordon Hodson (White City)	28.07	4–1
1972	Deneholme Chief	Fred Lugg (Brighton)	27.82	11–4
1973	Carry On Bimbo	Paddy Coughlan (Crayford)	27.95	6–4f
1974	Daemonic Gambol	Paddy McEvoy (Wimbledon)		

1935–1974 (500 yards)

== Track records ==
=== Post metric records ===
Distance (metres)	Greyhound	Time	Date	Notes
252	Travara Rock	15.15	12 December 1980	
252	Ballybeg Sport	15.14	1981	
252	Dysert Moth	15.08	10 December 1982	
252	Barbaran	15.18	5 May 1984	
252	Slipaway Jaydee	14.95	16 March 1994	
256	Setemup Joe	15.24	11 November 2003	
256	Drominboy Jet	15.24*	29 October 2005	St Leger heats split time
256	Thai Girl	15.23	18 March 2008	
256	Fifis Rocket	15.14	2 March 2010	
272	Wheres The Limo	16.23	11 May 1991	
272	Dynamic Fair	16.11	28 June 1997	
273	Officer Donagh	16.21	18 May 2010	
273	Jimmy Lollie	15.95	29 May 2010	
273	Jimmy Lollie	15.85	29 June 2010	
273	Skate On	15.82	31 May 2014	
276	Jans Rainbow	16.61	21 December 2006	
276	Lunar Vacation	16.26	7 July 2007	
412	Barbaran	24.96	30 May 1985	
412	Ballinahow Blue	24.89	27 December 1984	
412	Mr Plum	24.89	23 June 1987	
412	Spiral Manor	24.89	25 June 1987	
460	Flying Pursuit	27.60	12 October 1979	Puppy Derby heats
460	The Grand Devil	27.58	December 1979	The International
460	Flying Pursuit	27.58	2 May 1980	Laurels heats
460	Ramblers Jet	27.52	27 May 1980	
460	Upland Tiger	27.48	1980	Juvenile
460	Duke of Hazard	27.48	May 1982	Laurels heats
460	Kybo	27.48	8 December 1984	
460	Fearless Action	27.47	1986	
460	Sams Bridge	27.44	12 March 1988	
460	Double Bid	27.33	25 June 1988	
460	Droopys Shearer	27.32	17 June 2003	
460	Zigzag Dutchy	27.32	2 July 2005	
460	Lenson Bolt	27.30	27 October 2009	
460	Yahoo Jamie	27.29	15 December 2009	
460	Ardbeg Kate	27.29	15 December 2009	
480	Lloydsboro Flash	28.71	21 May 1985	Derby heats
480	Fearless Champ	28.66	21 May 1985	Derby heats
480	Morans Beef	28.60	25 May 1985	Derby heats
480	Fearless Action	28.51	29 May 1986	Derby heats
480	Lodge Prince	28.34	29 May 1986	Derby heats
480	Greenane Squire	28.21	12 July 1994	
480	Eye Eye Pickle	28.48	29 April 2010	New track – Derby heats
480	Aero Ardiles	28.38	29 April 2010	Derby heats
480	Bandicoot Tipoki	28.26	29 April 2010	Derby heats
480	Toomaline Jack	28.25	15 May 2010	Derby heats
480	Droopys Harvey	28.22	27 May 2011	
480	Razldazl Jayfkay	28.22	28 May 2011	Derby third round
480	Taylors Sky	28.21	31 May 2011	Derby quarter-finals
480	Taylors Sky	28.21	4 June 2011	Derby semi-finals
480	Taylors Sky	28.17	11 June 2011	Derby final
480	Razldazl Jayfkay	28.08	5 May 2012	Derby heats
480	Fiery Splendour	28.06	3 May 2014	Derby heats
480	Eden The Kid	27.95	30 May 2015	Derby heats
660	Jingling Star	40.61	27 July 1980	
660	Astrosyn Doll	40.48	30 September 1983	
660	Ballyregan Bob	40.35	23 November 1985	
660	Ballyregan Bob	40.15	19 April 1986	
660	First Defence	40.12	8 March 1994	
668	Baran Zulu	40.98	29 August 2003	
668	Special Trick	40.82	13 March 2004	WJ Cearns Memorial
668	Black Pear	40.51	20 July 2004	
668	Black Pear	40.52	2 July 2005	
668	Dazzle Special	40.45	15 December 2009	
680	Geinis Champion	41.73	24 June 1995	
687	Corrig Vieri	42.09	29 June 2010	
687	Corrig Vieri	41.97	3 August 2010	
687	Droopys Bradley	41.89	19 October 2010	St Leger semi-finals
687	Droopys Bradley	41.48	26 October 2010	St Leger final
687	Farloe Tango	41.40	12 November 2013	St Leger final
687	Romantic Rambo	41.24	31 May 2014	
687	Racenight Jenny	41.19	1 November 2014	
687	Millwards Teddy	41.13	27 June 2015	Derby final night
688	Shelbourne Star	41.83	5 June 2004	
688	Caloona Striker	41.77	25 June 2006	
820	Star Decision	51.48	28 July 1984	
820	Role of Fame	51.26	27 June 1987	
820	Exile Energy	51.20	1989	
820	Sail On Valerie	51.16	30 December 1989	
820	Chestnut Beauty	51.16	21 April 1993	
868	Princess Glin	54.76	14 September 1980	
868	Decoy Boom	54.60	1981	
868	Linkside Liquor	54.60	1981	=track record
868	Sandy Lane	54.11	6 May 1983	
872	Ericas Equity	55.47	28 June 2003	
872	Ericas Equity	54.30	9 September 2003	
872	Greenacre Lin	54.26	2 May 2005	
872	Spiridon Louis	54.22	7 June 2007	
892	Zenas Angel	56.19	14 November 2009	
894	Taylors Riviera	55.53	29 June 2010	
894	Roxholme Magic	54.78	4 June 2016	
1068	Lynns Pride	70.72	28 March 1980	
1068	Shropshire Lass	68.55	8 February 1990	
1080	Somer Lovin	69.64	7 July 2007	
412 H	Outcast Jet	26.19	1987	
412 H	Exchange Beamish	25.85	14 April 1984	
412 H	Pantile	25.38	5 August 1989	
460 H	Dine Out	28.29	12 December 1980	
460 H	Lilabeth	28.15	22 October 1985	
460 H	Emerald Trail	28.13	1989	
460 H	Unbelievable	28.00	22 June 1991	Champion Hurdle Final
460 H	Arfur Daley	27.80	20 March 1993	Springbok final
480 H	Men Of Hope	29.18	29 May 2010	Champion Hurdle Final
480 H	Toomaline Jack	28.96	18 June 2010	Grand National heats
480 H	Razldazl Raidio	28.89	25 February 2016	
660 H	Laurdella Wizard	42.33	1 September 1980	
660 H	Longcross Bruce	41.52	6 August 1982	
660 H	Gold Splash	41.15	2 August 1994	
668 H	Sizzlers Bossman	41.68	2 July 2005	

=== Pre metric records ===
Distance (yards)	Greyhound	Time	Date	Notes
275	Lone Keel	15.24	18 May 1938	
440	Wily Captain	24.95	29 July 1936	
440	Chi Chi's Joker	24.82	1 May 1968	
500	Future Cutlet	28.71	4 September 1931	Laurels semi final
500	Future Cutlet	28.52	11 September 1931	Laurels final
500	Beef Cutlet	28.50	27 August 1932	Laurels heats
500	Beef Cutlet	28.47	2 September 1932	Laurels final, world & national record
500	Davesland	28.32	24 August 1934	Laurels semi-finals
500	Ballyhennessy Sandhills	28.08	July 1938	National record
500	Ballymac Ball	28.03	August 1949	Laurels heats
500	Ballymac Ball	27.99	August 1949	Laurels semi-finals
500	Ford Spartan	27.89	23 August 1957	Laurels final
500	Mile Bush Pride		4 August 1959	
500	Clonalvy Pride	=27.66	18 August 1961	Laurels final
500	Venture Again	27.61	4 August 1965	
500	Shady Parachute	27.57	13 September 1968	
500	Moordyke Spot	27.57	29 July 1970	
550	Mick The Miller	31.72	31 August 1929	Match v Back Isle
700	Grosvenor Edwin	40.58	1950	
700	Hurry On Cleo	39.58	18 July 1958	
700	Dolores Rocket	39.58	26 July 1971	
725	Robeen Printer	41.51	28 April 1945	
880	Boothroyden Larry	51.18	26 August 1964	
880	Greenville Fauna	51.04	1970	
880	Following Day	50.70	16 August 1970	
940	Meteoric	54.13	26 August 1964	
1140	Curraheen Bride	67.86	16 August 1963	
1140	Bushane Star	66.86	8 August 1969	
440 H	Juvenile Classic	31.40	1 July 1938	
500 H	Sprightly Peter	28.88	1950	
500 H	Dunmore Viking		26 August 1959	
500 H	Change That		13 May 1960	
500 H	Ballinatona Special	28.37	12 May 1961	
500 H	Sherrys Prince	28.83	1971	Gold Cup final
700 H	Markhams Brandy	41.84	1950	
700 H	January Prince	41.36	25 July 1961	
700 H	Prince Cheetah	41.36	18 August 1961	
700 H	Quadrant King		23 August 1961	
