= 1934 UK & Ireland Greyhound Racing Year =

Greyhound racing year

The 1934 UK & Ireland Greyhound Racing Year was the ninth year of greyhound racing in the United Kingdom and the eighth year of greyhound racing in Ireland.

== Roll of honour ==
Major Winners
Award	Name of Winner
1934 English Greyhound Derby	Davesland
1934 Irish Greyhound Derby	Frisco Hobo
1934 Scottish Greyhound Derby	Olives Best
1934 Welsh Greyhound Derby	Valiant Rufus

== Summary ==
The Betting and Lotteries Act 1934 came into force which limited the number of racing days held at tracks but enabled totalisators to be used. The latter was particularly welcomed by the industry because they were very profitable. Each track was to hold no more than 104 meetings per year.

The industry continued to grow with an estimated 270 tracks (licensed and independent) in operation during 1934 and attendances surpassing 20 million for the third successive year. However unlike previous years only a handful of new tracks were opened. The 1934 English Greyhound Derby saw the likes of Wild Woolley, Brilliant Bob and Davesland compete with the eventual winner being Davesland trained by Jack Harvey.

== News ==
Arthur Elvin, owner of Wembley built the Empire Pool to introduce ice hockey, ice shows, tennis and boxing. The Greyhound Racing Association's (GRA) Hook Estate and Kennels at Northaw became famous within the industry following the success of the greyhounds trained from the facility. The 140 acres of park and grassland had separate kennel ranges for each relevant race track in London. The trainers were issued with their own cottages and kennel staff had the use of leisure facilities whilst the kennel manager and veterinary surgeon lived in the main mansion on site. There was an animal medical facility and even a sun tanning room for the greyhounds.

== Ireland ==
Harold's Cross Stadium was at last granted permission to run the Irish Greyhound Derby with the proviso that they contributed a minimum of £100 towards the event. The Irish Coursing Club added a further £50. It was also agreed that Shelbourne Park and Harold's Cross would run the competition in alternate years. The 1934 Irish Greyhound Derby consisted of nine first round heats with two qualifiers from each forming three semi-finals. The eventual winner was Frisco Hobo trained by Tom Harty.

== Competitions ==
The first classic of the year was the Gold Collar and Davesland, a 7-1 shot, won the final from the 1932 English Greyhound Derby champion Wild Woolley, now under the care of Harry Woolner. Coming home third was Gradual Rise for Harris at Harringay, this greyhound had broken the track record in the first round recording 32.32. Lemonition won the Grand National from the favourite Goodly News, the latter had recorded the fastest times in all three rounds leading up to the final. Former winners Long Hop and Scapegoat were both knocked out in earlier rounds, Long Hop would retire with a record of 49 wins from 85 races and a sixteen win sequence to his name.

The remainder of the year was all about Brilliant Bob, who on 14 July won the Cesarewitch, defeating hot favourite Lutwyche and three weeks later he won the Scurry Gold Cup defeating defending champion Creamery Border in the final. His consistency was evident and he won the Scurry by virtue of three straight wins in times of 23.48, 23.42 and 23.47. On the same night Wild Woolley broke the track record in a match race against Bella's Brother. Brilliant Bob then completed a treble by winning the Laurels. This treble was over distances from 400 to 600 yards demonstrating an ability over all trips. However the Laurels victory was not without incident because the first semi-final on 24 August was won in a track record time of 28.32 by Davesland from Brilliant Bob by seven lengths. In the second semi-final Creamery Border was disqualified for fighting with the re-run held a day later than the first semi-final. The re-run went to Bella's Brother and when Creamery Border returned, after injury and an enforced rest, he broke the track record at Wimbledon over 500 yards in 28.29 seconds. This win was even more significant because he beat Brilliant Bob by eight lengths.

== Tracks opened ==
Date	Stadium/Track	Location	Ref
26 January	Wishaw Greyhound Stadium	Wishaw	
18 May	Kilmarnock Greyhound Stadium	Kilmarnock	
25 May	Dillington Park Stadium	Barnsley	
30 May	Bayview Park	Methil	
20 August	Shotts Gasworks Park Greyhound Track	Shotts	
28 September	Dearne Athletic and Sports Stadium	Barnsley	
15 December	Kirkcaldy Greyhound Stadium	Kirkcaldy	
25 December	Easington Greyhound Stadium	Easington	
26 December	Kilcohan Park	Waterford	
unknown	Highgate Stadium	Goldthorpe	
unknown	Wombwell Greyhound Stadium	Wombwell	

== Principal UK races ==
Gold Collar, Catford (May 19, 540y)
Pos	Name of Greyhound	Trainer	SP	Time	Trap
1st	Davesland	Jack Harvey	7-1	32.70	3
2nd	Wild Woolley	Harry Woolner	4-6f	32.94	5
3rd	Gradual Rise	Harris	8-1	32.97	4
U	Flash Kate	Paddy McEllistrim	10-1		1
U	Gallant Ranker	Leslie Reynolds	33-1		2
U	Jack's Joke	Claude Champion	4-1		6

Welsh Derby, White City (Cardiff) (26 May, 525y)
Pos	Name of Greyhound	Trainer	SP	Time	Trap
1st	Valiant Rufus (7y)	Leslie Carpenter	1/1f	30.08	4
2nd	Porthkerry Oliver Twist (9y)		5/2	30.32	5
3rd	Bucail Macanta (sr)		8/1	30.80	1
u	Con Brio (2y)				
u	Millside Ranger (3y)				

Grand National, White City (Jun 9, 525y h)
Pos	Name of Greyhound	Trainer	SP	Time	Trap
1st	Lemonition	Dan Costello	11-4	30.84	4
2nd	Jeff's Romeo	Arthur Doc Callanan	100-8	31.20	2
3rd	Goodly News	Paddy McEllistrim	1-2f	31.32	1
4th	Dourope	Leslie Reynolds	10-1	31.36	3

Cesarewitch, West Ham (Jul 14, 600y)
Pos	Name of Greyhound	Trainer	SP	Time	Trap
1st	Brilliant Bob	Sidney Orton	9-2	33.80	4
2nd	The Longfellow II	Sidney Orton	100-7	33.92	5
3rd	Lutwyche	Stanley Biss	5-4f	34.16	3
U	The Daw	Sidney Probert	5-1		1
U	Kumm on Steve	Albert Jonas	3-1		2
U	Alexander Selkirk	R O'Brien	20-1		6

Scottish Greyhound Derby, Carntyne (Jul 21, 525y)
Pos	Name of Greyhound	Trainer	SP	Time	Trap
1st	Olives Best	Arthur 'Doc' Callanan	7-4jf	29.90	
?	Two Aces	Carntyne			
?	Public Enemy				

Scurry Gold Cup, Clapton (Aug 4, 400y)
Pos	Name of Greyhound	Trainer	SP	Time	Trap
1st	Brilliant Bob	Sidney Orton	9-4f	23.47	5
2nd	Lynton II	Arthur 'Doc' Callanan	11-2	23.67	3
3rd	Jeff's Fashion	Paddy Fortune	6-1	23.83	4
U	Bills Selected	Harry Woolner	5-1		1
U	Westerham	Charles Cross	100-8		2
U	Creamery Border	Arthur 'Doc' Callanan	5-2		6

Laurels, Wimbledon (Sep 1, 500y)
Pos	Name of Greyhound	Trainer	SP	Time	Trap
1st	Brilliant Bob	Sidney Orton	7-1	28.46	6
2nd	Jeff's Fashion	Paddy Fortune	20-1	28.66	5
3rd	Bella's Brother	Stanley Biss	7-1	28.94	3
U	Trinidad	Rupert Eavis	40-1		1
U	Hay Bay	Rupert Eavis	20-1		2
U	Davesland	Jack Harvey	2-7f		4

St Leger, Wembley (Sep 29, 700y)
Pos	Name of Greyhound	Trainer	SP	Time	Trap
1st	Bosham	Leslie Reynolds	13-8	41.17	1
2nd	The Daw	Sidney Probert	4-6f	41.45	3
3rd	Dumont	Sid Jennings	10-1	41.69	4
4th	Telephone Numbers	Johnny Bullock	20-1		2

Oaks, White City (Oct 20, 525y)
Pos	Name of Greyhound	Trainer	SP	Time	Trap
1st	Gallant Ruth	Harry Buck	10-11f	30.22	2
2nd	Glowing Report	Bill Cowell	4-1	30.38	1
3rd	Chinese Cherry	Dan Costello	4-1	30.42	4
U	Kitshine	Arthur 'Doc' Callanan	8-1		3
U	Dumont	Sid Jennings	8-1		5
U	Lucy Green	Jim Syder Sr.	100-8		6

== Key ==
U = unplaced
+ = Track Record
