= 1931 UK & Ireland Greyhound Racing Year =

The 1931 UK & Ireland Greyhound Racing Year was the sixth year of greyhound racing in the United Kingdom. and the fifth year of greyhound racing in Ireland. The total annual attendance across the country for 1931 increased to 17,906,917 from 17,119,120 (in 1930), a fifth consecutive annual increase.

== Summary ==
Mick the Miller was a now household name in the United Kingdom following his achievement in winning a second English Greyhound Derby. A third Derby win was the primary target for the year but before the event started he successfully defended his Wembley Spring Cup title during March. He won the heat and semi final before claiming the final on 23 March 1931 in a track record time of 30.04. After three more races he then participated in the 1931 English Greyhound Derby. The exploits of Mick the Miller was propelling many other greyhounds to national fame at the time. He retired on a high with an undefeated run to St Leger glory. The final opposition had included Virile Lad, the brilliant bitch Bradshaw Fold and the Derby champion Seldom Led. He was retired to stud with Jack Masters in Norfolk and later starred in a film called Wild Boy produced by Gainsborough Pictures, along with stars of the day, Sonnie Hale, Bud Flanagan and Chesney Allen.

== Tracks ==
At least 17 new tracks opened during 1931, including a new stadium on the Park Royal site in London. The Associated Greyhound Company that owned the tracks of Towneley and Darnall and the lease at Craven Park went bankrupt. Towneley was then bought by Captain Ramsbottom.

The Duchy of Cornwall proposed allowing greyhound racing to take place at The Oval, to generate income for the Kennington area, the proposal failed following protests from neighbours and Christian groups. The Greyhound Racing Association's (GRA) Hook Estate and Kennels at Northaw opened.

== Ireland ==
Following a meeting by the Irish Coursing Club on 4 August, the idea of a major racing calendar schedule was discussed and circulated to the Irish tracks. The Kilkenny dog Little Chummie completed a significant double by winning the National Cup at Shelbourne Park and the unofficial 1931 Irish Greyhound Derby at Harold's Cross Stadium.

== Competitions ==
A greyhound called Future Cutlet arrived on the scene, sired by Mutton Cutlet he had come over from Ireland after being purchased for £600 by W.A. Evershed to race at Wembley Stadium. He was trained by Sidney Probert and was then entered for the 1931 Cesarewitch at West Ham Stadium. He set a new national record for the 600 yards in the heats before winning the event. Mick the Miller finished runner-up.

Altamatzin won the Welsh Greyhound Derby before defeating Mick the Miller in a match race on 15 August 1931, at the Welsh White City. Future Cutlet secured a second major trophy by virtue of winning the Laurels at Wimbledon. Another greyhound that had appeared during the year was a brindle dog called Wild Woolley, the April 1930 whelp, came to prominence when winning the Trafalgar Puppy Cup.

Bradshaw Fold confirmed her status as the leading bitch by reaching a third consecutive Oaks final but a third-place finish meant that she would retire with only a Coronation Stakes to her name.

== Tracks opened ==
Date	Stadium/Track	Location
31 January	GER Sports Ground	March, Cambridgeshire
22 February	Park Royal Stadium	London
20 March	Clonmel Greyhound Stadium	Clonmel
3 April	Ashby-de-la-Zouch	Ashby-de-la-Zouch
4 April	Peterborough Greyhound Stadium	Peterborough
10 April	Coldham Lane	Cambridge
11 May	Millmoor	Rotherham
23 May	Warrington Greyhound Stadium	Warrington
23 May	Virginia Park	Caerphilly
25 May	East End Park	Dunfermline
25 May	Portsmouth Stadium	Portsmouth
10 July	Recreation Ground, Tredegar	Tredegar
20 September	Romford Greyhound Stadium	Romford
24 October	Southall Greyhound Stadium	London
7 November	Halifax Greyhound Stadium	Halifax
14 November	Reading Stadium	Reading
11 December	Cliftonhill	Glasgow
unknown	Luton Stadium	Luton
unknown	Syston Sports Stadium	Leicestershire

== Roll of honour ==
Major Winners
Award	Name of Winner
1931 English Greyhound Derby	Seldom Led
1931 Irish Greyhound Derby+	Little Chummie
1931 Scottish Greyhound Derby	Sister Olive
1931 Welsh Greyhound Derby	Altamatzin

+ unofficial National Derby

== Principal UK races ==
Cesarewitch, West Ham (July 18, 600y, £700)
Pos	Name of Greyhound	Trainer	SP	Time	Trap
1st	Future Cutlet	Sidney Probert	10-11f	34.03	1
2nd	Mick the Miller	Sidney Orton	5-2	34.43	3
3rd	Lulla Von	Roberts	100-7	34.83	2
u	Five of Hearts	Thomas Cudmore	100-8		4
u	Mahers Prospect	Williams	10-1		5
u	Clandown Sweep	Sidney Orton	10-1		6

Scottish Greyhound Derby, Carntyne (Jul 25, 525y, £150)
Pos	Name of Greyhound	Trainer	SP	Time	Trap
1st	Sister Olive	Collins WC Glasgow	5-1	30.65	3
2nd	Telepathy	(Powderhall)	5-2	30.66	6
3rd	Qua Iboe	(Carntyne)	10-1	30.82	1
u	Locknavon		2-1		
u	Man Friday		6-4f		
u	Good Cheer		50-1		

Grand National, White City (Jul 25, 525y h, £300)
Pos	Name of Greyhound	Trainer	SP	Time	Trap
1st	Rule The Roost	Joe Harmon	5-2	31.17	3
2nd	Knave of Hearts	Bob Burls	6-4f	31.41	4
3rd	Merry Matt	Bob Burls	5-2	31.45	1
4th	Honeymans Last	Chapman	7-1		2

Scurry Gold Cup, Clapton (Aug 1, 400y, £300)
Pos	Name of Greyhound	Trainer	SP	Time	Trap
1st	Brave Enough	Harry Buck	7-1	23.62	4
2nd	Odd Minister		100-7	23.63	1
3rd	Lions Share	Arthur Doc Callanan	1-2f	23.67	2
u	Lulla Von	Roberts	8-1		3
u	Debonie	Arthur 'Doc' Callanan	10-1		5
u	Dublin	Fred Wilson	10-1		6

Welsh Derby, White City (Cardiff) (Aug 3, 525y, £102)
Pos	Name of Greyhound	Trainer	SP	Time	Trap
1st	Altamatzin	Arthur Doc Callanan	2-1	29.88	4
2nd	Dee Swift	Mrs D Firman	3-1		5
3rd	Prince Fern	Stanley Biss	10-1		6
u	Rory the Hill	Thomas Cudmore			2
u	Morris's Mistake	(WC Cardiff)			3

Laurels, Wimbledon (Sep 11, 500y, £1,330)
Pos	Name of Greyhound	Trainer	SP	Time	Trap
1st	Future Cutlet	Sidney Probert	2-5f	28.52	4
2nd	Tipperary Boy	Jerry Hannafin	10-1	28.92	6
3rd	Melksham Gnat	Sid Jennings	100-6	29.16	1
u	Irish Wit	Jerry Hannafin	10-1		5
u	Luvett	Darlington	8-1		3
u	Bentley	Stanley Biss	25-1		2

St Leger, Wembley (Oct 3, 700y, £750)
Pos	Name of Greyhound	Trainer	SP	Time	Trap
1st	Mick the Miller	Sidney Orton	1-1f	41.31	3
2nd	Virile Bill	Sid Jennings	9-2	41.33	2
3rd	Bradshaw Fold	Stanley Biss	8-1	41.36	1
4th	Seldom Led	Wally Green	9-4		4

Oaks, White City (Oct 17, 525y, £300)
Pos	Name of Greyhound	Trainer	SP	Time	Trap
1st	Drizzle	Harry Woolner	4-6f	30.00	4
2nd	Clear Bead	Jerry Hannafin	6-1	30.40	2
3rd	Bradshaw Fold	Stanley Biss	4-1	30.56	1
u	Queen of the Hills		10-1		3
u	Shusan	(Belle Vue)	100-7		5
u	Melksham Gnat	Sid Jennings	33-1		6

== Principal Irish finals ==
Easter Cup, Shelbourne (525y, 23 May)
Pos	Name of Greyhound	SP	Time
1st	Lion's Share (Edward Lyng)		30.71

Trigo Cup, Celtic Park (640y, 5 June)
Pos	Name of Greyhound	SP	Time
1st	Bright Brindle (John Baird)	6-4f	37.67
2nd	Drumcrow (F Allen)	6-1	37.74
3rd	Maori Maid (D Walsh)	7-2	37.88
u	Straight Road (W Slater)	5-1	
u	Wackabite (Hebbleditch)	7-2	

== Key ==
U = unplaced 0.08 sec = 1 length
