= 1935 UK & Ireland Greyhound Racing Year =

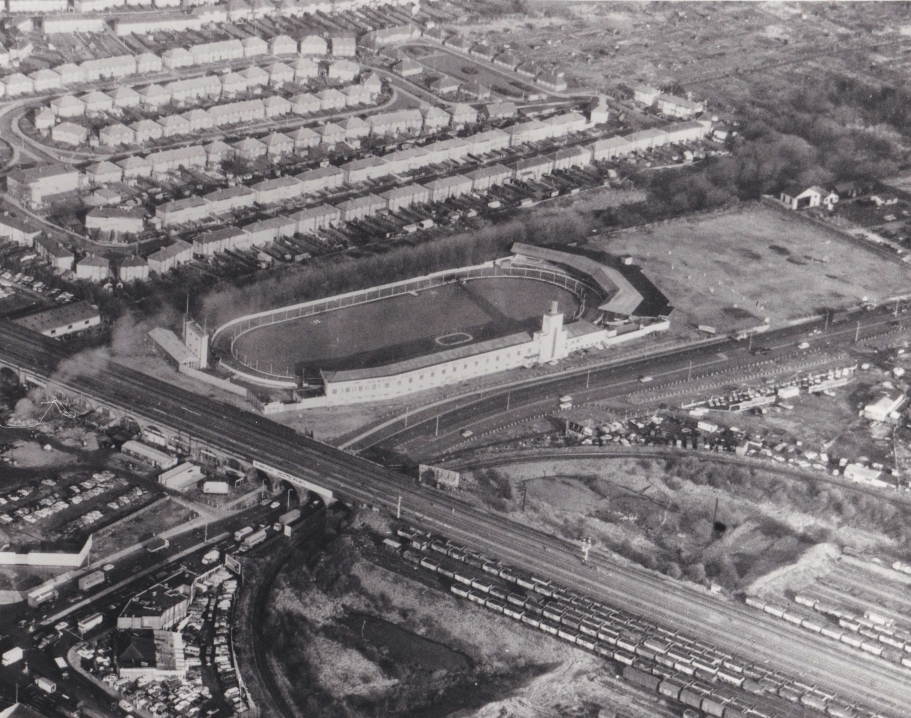
- Hendon opened during 1935

The 1935 UK & Ireland Greyhound Racing Year was the tenth year of greyhound racing in the United Kingdom and the ninth year of greyhound racing in Ireland.

== Roll of honour ==
Major Winners
Award	Name of Winner
1935 English Greyhound Derby	Greta Ranee
1935 Irish Greyhound Derby	Roving Yank
1935 Scottish Greyhound Derby	Olives Best

== Summary ==
The sport remained extremely popular, with attendances exceeding 20 million for a fourth successive year. Racing was an affordable national pastime in the United Kingdom and Ireland and profits made by the tracks enabled the greyhound companies to flourish. Major-General Lord Loch (chairman) announced that the nations leading Greyhound company, the Greyhound Racing Association (GRA) made an operating profit of over £136,000 during 1935 (a substantial figure at the time).

The construction of new tracks had slowed considerably but the GRA announced their plans to build Harringay Arena and also purchased Stenhouse Stadium.

Greta Ranee won the 1935 English Greyhound Derby before a record crowd of 88,700.

Brilliant Bob was retired to stud.

== Tracks ==
Clyde F.C.'s financial difficulties led to them selling Shawfield Stadium to the Shawfield Greyhound Racing Company Ltd, continuing to play there as tenants. A similar problem arose at East End Park, home to Dunfermline Athletic F.C., the introduction of greyhound racing saved the club from going bankrupt. Four new directors joined the original three to form Romford Stadium Ltd and at Romford Greyhound Stadium they invested £17,000 to build extra stands and kennels. The company would also soon take ownership of the nearby Dagenham Greyhound Stadium.

The Dearne Athletic and Sports Stadium closed resulting in the directors applying for a licence at Oaks Lane, off the Doncaster Road in Barnsley, but it was refused. Park Royal Stadium was enlarged for use by Acton and Willesden rugby league club and Captain Ramsbottom sold Towneley Stadium to the Burnley Corporation who then closed the track in November.

=== Tracks opened ===
Date	Stadium/Track	Location	Ref
5 March	Hendon Greyhound Stadium	London	
3 August	Chester Greyhound Stadium	Chester	
11 September	Ipswich Stadium	Ipswich	
unknown	Rye House Stadium	Hertfordshire	
unknown	Mexborough Greyhound Stadium	Mexborough	
unknown	Aldershot Stadium	Tongham, Farnham	

== Competitions ==
The pre-Derby events got underway and the Gold Collar saw St Leger champion Bosham defeat 1934 English Greyhound Derby runner-up Grey Raca by a head with hot favourite Jacks Joke and promising newcomer Great Ranee both unplaced in the final.

For a third year running Creamery Border reached the Scurry Gold Cup final only to be beaten by a short head by Jack's Joke in a track record time of 23.15. Jack's Joke had already set a new track record of 23.27 in round one. The time set by Creamery border in his defeat was 23.19, the second ever fastest time. Despite the fact that he was coming up to five years old he went on to win the Chelsea Cup at Stamford Bridge, beating Ripe Cherry and setting a new track and world record of 28.01 seconds for 500 yards. When he was retired to stud he became a prominent sire and died aged fourteen and a half.

Ataxy returned to White City in August and set a new 550 yard record when recording 30.97 sec and then set a second record over 525 yards recording 29.56 sec. After this Kitshine beat Curleys Fancy and Stout Heart in the Laurels final.

The St Leger went to Satans Baby (winner of the 1934 and 1935 Daily Mirror Trophy) after defeating a field that including Bosham. Kitshine completed a successful season when winning the Oaks. Ataxy had timed his runs too late for the Derby but was installed as hot favourite for the forthcoming Cesarewitch. The brindle defeated Brilliant Bob by twelve lengths in round one at odds of 1-6f, defeated Bosham in the second round opposition by over ten lengths and set a national record of 33.67. In the semi-final Ataxy broke the world record time over 660 yards, he ran in eight lengths clear of Grand Flight II recording 33.50. Unfortunately in the final Ataxy found considerable trouble and came home fourth.

A new competition called the Pall Mall Stakes took place at Harringay Stadium. Shove Halfpenny, sired by Town Treasure out of Princess Karl and whelped in July 1933 was the winner, despite the fact that it was his first important race, After winning his qualifying heats; he defeated his rival, Grand Flight II, in the final by a head after being baulked on the first bend. The final was actually held on 4 January 1936 being the last major event of year the heats were in December.

== Principal UK races ==
Gold Collar, Catford (18 May, 400y, £1,000)
Pos	Name of Greyhound	Trainer	SP	Time	Trap
1st	Bosham	Leslie Reynolds	5-1	32.84	6
2nd	Grey Raca	Les Parry	10-3	32.86	4
3rd	Fat Lincense	Hammond	100-7	33.10	5
U	Jack's Joke	Claude Champion	4-5f		1
U	Greta Ranee	Albert Jonas	5-1		2
U	Shed Labourer	Dal Hawkesley	100-6		3

Grand National, White City (8 Jun, 525y h, £300)
Pos	Name of Greyhound	Trainer	SP	Time	Trap
1st	Quarter Cross	Sidney Probert	7-2	30.76	1
2nd	Hawtrey	Harry Buck	4-1	30.79	3
3rd	King of the Road	Sidney Probert	100-6	31.43	2
4th	Kilganny Bridge	Patrick Higgins	4-7f	32.07	4

Scottish Greyhound Derby, Carntyne (20 Jul, 525y, £130)
Pos	Name of Greyhound	Trainer	SP	Time	Trap
1st	Olive's Best	Arthur 'Doc' Callanan	4-7f	30.16	1
2nd	Olive's Beauty				2
3rd	Hillelevator				4
U	Nsuak				
U	Olive's Dearest				
U	Konoto				

Scurry Gold Cup, Clapton (3 Aug, 400y, £600)
Pos	Name of Greyhound	Trainer	SP	Time	Trap
1st	Jack's Joke	Claude Champion	10-11f	23.15 TR	1
2nd	Creamery Border	Arthur 'Doc' Callanan	5-1	23.19	3
3rd	Famous Judgment	Johnny Bullock	9-1	23.67	4
U	Cash Collector	Dal Hawkesley	10-1		2
U	Famous Judge	Johnny Bullock	5-1		5
U	Sherwood Tiger	Harry Buck	20-1		6

Laurels, Wimbledon (30 Aug, 500y, £700)
Pos	Name of Greyhound	Trainer	SP	Time	Trap
1st	Kitshine	Arthur 'Doc' Callanan	3-1	29.05	6
2nd	Curleys Fancy II	Joe Harmon	13-8f	29.06	4
3rd	Stout Heart	Bill Cowell	6-1	29.09	1
U	Garrick	Jack Harvey	100-8		2
U	Fresh Judgment	Johnny Bullock	5-1		3
U	Final Record	Stanley Biss	5-1		5

St Leger, Wembley (27 Sep, 700y, £600)
Pos	Name of Greyhound	Trainer	SP	Time	Trap
1st	Satans Baby	Les Parry	10-11f	40.95	3
2nd	Bosham	R Bunday	11-8	40.97	1
3rd	The Daw	Sidney Probert	10-1	41.45	4
4th	Money Over	Sidney Probert	8-1	41.69	2

Oaks, White City (5 Oct, 525y, £300)
Pos	Name of Greyhound	Trainer	SP	Time	Trap
1st	Kitshine	Arthur 'Doc' Callanan	11-2	30.12	4
2nd	Peakland Jean	(Derby)	20-1	30.68	3
3rd	Ripe Cherry	Johnny Bullock	2-1f	30.70	5
U	Chicken Sandwich	Arthur Doc Callanan	10-3		1
U	Flawless Jewel	Johnny Bullock	3-1		2
U	Gallant Ruth	Harry Buck	7-1		6

Cesarewitch, West Ham (23 Oct, 600y, £450)
Pos	Name of Greyhound	Trainer	SP	Time	Trap
1st	Grand Flight II	Jim Syder Sr.	33-1	33.97	6
2nd	Shove Halfpenny	Charlie Ashley	7-1	34.00	2
3rd	Ataxy	Charlie Ashley	1-4f	34.06	4
U	Bosham	R Bunday	33-1		1
U	Money Over	Sidney Probert	50-1		3
U	Itchok	Arthur 'Doc' Callanan	100-7		5

== Key ==
- U = unplaced
- TR = Track Record
- 1 length = 0.01 sec
