= Thomas Pryce (disambiguation) =

Thomas Pryce is the name of:

- Thomas Pryce (1886–1918), First World War British Army officer, recipient of the Victoria Cross
- Thomas Parry Pryce (died 1953), Welsh Anglican priest, second Archdeacon of Newport
- Tom Pryce (1949–1977), Welsh racing driver
- Tom ap Rhys Pryce (1974–2006), British lawyer murdered by two teenagers

== See also ==
- Thomas Pryce-Jenkins (1862–1922), Welsh international rugby union player
- Thomas Price (disambiguation)
- Tom Price (disambiguation)
