= List of rider deaths in motorcycle speedway =

Rider deaths in motorcycle speedway

This article lists riders who have died competing at motorcycle speedway events. During the mid-2000s air fences were installed at most oval cinder/shale tracks, which consequently and significantly reduced deaths and serious injury.

== List ==
Date of death	Rider	Circuit	Meeting	Ref
7 April 1927	(Australia) Tommy Maher	Brisbane Exhibition Speedway	Australian National Speedway Championship	
21 October 1928	(England) Clifford Mawson	Athletic Grounds, Rochdale	Senior race	
11 May 1929	(England) Walter Brown	Marine Gardens	Consolation handicap	
18 May 1929	(England) John Proctor Stockdale	Farringdon Park Preston	Junior scratch race	
18 June 1929	(England) George Rowlands	Audenshaw Speedway	Junior mile race	
13 July 1929	(England) Dennis Atkinson	Cleveland Park Stadium	English Dirt Track League	
18 August 1929	(England) John Seith	Farringdon Park Preston	open event	
27 May 1930	(England) Eddie Reynolds	White City Stadium, Glasgow	Northern League	
24 July 1930	(England) James Carnie	Farringdon Park Preston	Golden Helmet	
31 August 1930	(England) William Owen	Audenshaw Speedway	Handicap event	
1 November 1930	(Australia) Sigismund Schlam	WACA Ground	Handicap event	
3 November 1930	(Australia) Charles Edwin Wear	Bunbury Speedway	Race	
25 August 1931	(England) Noel Johnson	Pennycross Stadium	Challenge match	
12 September 1931	(England) James 'Indian' Allen	Hyde Road	Southern League	
13 April 1933	(Australia) Cornelius Cantwell	Aarhus Dirt-Track Bane	Open meeting	
2 September 1934	(Netherlands) Arij Poldervaart	Velká pardubická	Golden Helmet of Czechoslovakia	
27 January 1935	(New Zealand) Charlie Blacklock	Monica Park Christchurch	Handicap event	
30 August 1935	(England) Tom Farndon	New Cross Stadium	Speedway World Championship	
21 December 1935	(Australia) Frank Elms	Sydney Royale	Australia v England test match	
15 May 1936	(England) Dusty Haigh	Hackney Wick Stadium	Auto-Cycle Union Cup	
25 August 1937	(England) Stan Hart	Hall Green Stadium	Provincial Championship	
30 September 1937	(England) Reg Vigor	Wimbledon Stadium	National League	
19 December 1937	(Australia) Neil Schiller	Claremont Speedway	Speedway International Tournament	
17 May 1938	(England) Harry Rogers	Dagenham Ripple Road	Charity meeting	
11 August 1938	(England) David Jackson	Dagenham Ripple Road	Practice	
26 December 1938	(Australia) Roy Noble	Warragul	Victorian ACU Grass-track Championship	
16 July 1946	(England) Albert 'Aussie' Rosenfeld	Odsal Stadium	National League	
8 October 1946	(Canada) Charlie Appleby	Brough Park Stadium	Northern League	
9 July 1947	(England) Peter Jackson	Banister Court Stadium	Novice race	
16 August 1947	(England) Nelson 'Bronco' Wilson	Harringay Stadium	Speedway National Trophy	
16 August 1947	(England) Cyril Anderson	The Firs Stadium	British Division 2 Best Pairs	
30 August 1947	(England) Jack Ladd	Alkmaar Sportpark	Open meeting	
4 October 1947	(Austria) Martin Schneeweiß	Grazer Trabrennbahn	Speedway Austrian Championship	
4 May 1948	(England) Reg Craven	Wimborne Road	Speedway National Trophy	
15 June 1948	(England) Eric Dunn	Arlington Stadium	National League	
5 July 1948	(England) Billy Wilson	The Firs Stadium	National League	
14 July 1948	(Australia) Max Pearce	Yarmouth Stadium	National League	
8 June 1949	(England) Ted Hurn	Littledean grasstrack	Grass track event	
20 January 1950	(Australia) Ray Duggan	Sydney Sports Ground	International Australia versus England	
21 January 1950	(Australia) Norman Clay	Sydney Sports Ground	International Australia versus England	
11 March 1950	(South Africa) Oscar Wessman	Johannesburg	South Africa versus British tourists	
1 July 1950	(England) Joe Abbott	Odsal Stadium	National League	
1 July 1950	(England) Jock Shead	The Firs Stadium	British National Trophy	
18 July 1950	(England) Ronald Stocker	Rye House Stadium	Practice	
6 January 1951	(Australia) Ken Le Breton	Sydney Sports Ground	International test match	
4 May 1951	(England) Dick Jenkins	Pennycross Stadium	Practice	
19 August 1951	(West Germany) Erich Berghöfer	Stadion am Zoo	German Concrete Track Championship	
10 November 1951	(England) Bob Howes	The Firs Stadium	National League	
14 April 1952	(West Germany) Willi Thorn	Bamberger Zementbahn	German Concrete Track Championship	
22 July 1952	(United States) Ernie Roccio	West Ham Stadium	National League	
16 November 1952	(Australia) Letium Platton	Stanthorpe	Queensland Grass Track Championship	
26 March 1953	(Australia) Roy Eather	County Ground Stadium	Practice	
6 June 1953	(England) Mike Rogers	Monmore Green Stadium	National League	
7 July 1953	(England) Harry Eyre	West Ham Stadium	Junior League	
13 May 1955	(England) John Kerrigan Thomson	Wimborne Road	National League Div 2	
2 April 1956	(England) Malcolm Flood	Wimborne Road	National League	
21 April 1956	(Poland) Zbigniew Raniszewski	Praterstadion	Speedway Austria & Germany versus Poland	
19 June 1956	(Austria) Fritz Dirtl	Niederrheinstadion	Speedway World Championship	
16 August 1956	(England) Raymond Beaumont	Newquay grasstrack	500cc Grasstrack	
22 September 1956	(England) Ernie Rawlins	Banister Court Stadium	National League	
2 February 1957	(England) Alan Hunt	Wembley Johannesburg	Durban vs Klerksdorp	
31 May 1958	(Finland) Erkki Ala-Sippola	Helsinki Velodrome	Finnish Speedway Championship	
28 March 1959	(England) Alan Pearce	Banister Court Stadium	Challenge match	
3 June 1959	(Poland) Jerzy Grochowski	Stadion Polonii Piła	Polish Speedway Team Championship	
24 July 1960	(England) Tink Maynard	The Firs Stadium	National Trophy	
3 September 1960	(Poland) Witold Świątkowski	Rybnik Municipal Stadium	Polish Speedway Championship, 1st Division	
19 August 1961	(West Germany) Erich Stieglmeier	Svítkov Stadium	Golden Helmet of Czechoslovakia	
19 August 1961	(Czechoslovakia) Libor Dušánek	Svítkov Stadium	Golden Helmet of Czechoslovakia	
15 September 1961	(Poland) Bronisław Idzikowski	Częstochowa Municipal Stadium	Polish Speedway Team Championship	
13 April 1962	(England) Jack Unstead	Foxhall Stadium	Challenge match	
15 August 1962	(Poland) Stanislaw Domaniecki	Stadion Startu Gniezno	Polish Speedway Team Championship	
21 September 1962	(Sweden) Arne Wettergren	Dagsbergsfältet Norrköping	Practice	
3 December 1962	(Australia) Des Simon	Brisbane Exhibition Ground	Queensland Speedway Championship	
18 September 1963	(Czechoslovakia) Antonín Vilde	Velká pardubická	Golden Helmet of Czechoslovakia	
24 September 1963	(England) Peter Craven	Meadowbank Stadium	Speedway National Test Match	
21 January 1964	(Poland) Tadeusz Teodorowicz	West Ham Stadium	National Trophy	
22 June 1965	(Australia) David John Wills	West Ham Stadium	Challenge	
23 August 1966	(Wales) Ivor Hughes	Dudley Wood Stadium	National League	
14 August 1967	(Poland) Andrzej Walicki	Polonia Piła Stadium	Polish Speedway Team Championship	
1 October 1967	(Denmark) Poul Wissing	Rostock Speedwaystadion	Open meeting	
9 November 1967	(Australia) Harry Denton	Rowley Park Speedway	Rowley Park Speedway Season	
21 February 1968	(Australia) Lionel Levy	Sydney Showground Speedway	handicap event	
7 September 1968	(West Germany) Herbert Bauer	Pfarrkirchen	Practice	
21 October 1968	(Czechoslovakia) Luboš Tomíček Sr.	Svítkov Stadium	Golden Helmet of Czechoslovakia	
28 January 1970	(Sweden) Sven Renlund	Örnsköldsvik	Swedish Ice Racing Championship	
19 April 1970	(Poland) Marian Rose	Stal Rzeszów Municipal Stadium	Polish Speedway Team Championship	
27 April 1970	(Poland) Benedykt Błaszkiewicz	KS Apator Stadium	Training	
7 April 1971	(Soviet Union) Valeri Klementiev	Russia	National team practice	
29 June 1971	(Poland) Jerzy Bildziukiewicz	Polonia Bydgoszcz Stadium	Polish Speedway Championship, 1st Division	
26 September 1972	(Poland) Marek Czerny	Stal Rzeszów Municipal Stadium	Silver Helmet Tournament	
29 September 1972	(Norway) Svein Kaasa	Hampden Park	National League	
8 December 1972	(Australia) Jack Biggs	Golden City International Raceway	Scratch Race	
15 December 1973	(Australia) Geoff Curtis	Sydney Showground Speedway	Individual event	
7 April 1974	(Poland) Zbigniew Malinowski	Stadion Śląski	Polish Speedway Championship, 1st Division	
11 August 1974	(Poland) Jerzy Białek	Stal Rzeszów Municipal Stadium	Polish Speedway Club Pairs Championship	
29 September 1974	(West Germany) Gerhard Kamm	Pfarrkirchen	Longtrack	
17 October 1975	(New Zealand) Gary Peterson	Monmore Green Stadium	Midland Cup	
20 May 1976	(Sweden) Tommy Jansson	Gubbängens Idrottsplats	Speedway World Championship	
25 July 1976	(Poland) Kazimierz Araszewicz	Arena Częstochowa	League match	
1 August 1976	(England) Roger Parker	Elberton	Wessex Centre Grass Championship	
24 April 1977	(West Germany) Josef Angermüller	San Savino Speedway Park	Speedway World Championship	
27 April 1977	(England) Kevin Holden	Wimborne Road	Speedway Star Knockout Cup	
8 June 1977	(Poland) Marcin Rożak	Tarnów Municipal Stadium	Silver Helmet Tournament	
19 June 1977	(England) Tom Albery	Sherfield English	Southern Centre Grass Track Riders Association	
3 December 1977	(England) Stuart Shirley	Ellesmere Port Stadium	Practice session	
3 April 1978	(England) Chris Prime	Brough Park Stadium	National league	
4 June 1978	(England) Graham Banks	Hopes Farm, New Romney	Grasstrack meeting	
25 June 1978	(West Germany) Hans Siegl	Linzer Stadion	Open event	
8 June 1979	(England) Vic Harding	Hackney Wick Stadium	British League Fours	
9 December 1979	(Sweden) Christer Sjösten	Brisbane Exhibition Ground	Speedway International Tournament	
7 September 1981	(England) Tony Sanford	County Ground Stadium	National League	
27 April 1982	(Australia) Brett Alderton	Norfolk Arena	National League	
1 June 1982	(Czech Republic) Zdeněk Kudrna	Stadskanaal	European Grasstrack Championship	
16 July 1982	(United States) Denny Pyeatt	Hackney Wick Stadium	National League	
16 September 1983	(England) Craig Featherby	East of England Showground	National League	
19 February 1984	(Soviet Union) Anatoly Gladyshev	Lenin Stadium	World Ice Speedway Championship	
13 May 1984	(West Germany) Max Schöllhorn	Artigues-de-Lussac, France	grass track meeting	
19 May 1984	(England) Neal Watson	Norfolk Arena	Junior match	
29 July 1984	(Sweden) Leif Wahlman	Norfolk Arena	Speedway Under-21 World Championship Finals	
27 August 1984	(Soviet Union) Alexander Korshakov	Rivne Speedway Stadium	Soviet league match	
5 May 1986	(Soviet Union) Meelis Helm	Stadium Lokomotīve	USSR League Speedway	
17 August 1986	(West Germany) Walter Diener	Schwarme	Grasstrack	
22 April 1987	(Poland) Grzegorz Smolinski	Golęcin Speedway Stadium	Four Nations Tournament	
13 August 1987	(Poland) Wiesław Pawlak	Zielona Góra Speedway Stadium	Polish Speedway Team Championship	
19 July 1988	(United States) Ken Berry	Inland Motorcycle Speedway	Golden State Speedway Series - Division II	
30 June 1989	(England) Paul Muchene	Hackney Wick Stadium	British National league	
16 June 1991	(Czechoslovakia) Jiří Hurych	Miramont, France	Grasstrack meeting	
3 September 1992	(Poland) Grzegorz Kowszewicz	KS Apator Stadium	Training	
28 September 1992	(England) Wayne Garratt	Brough Park Stadium	British League	
16 January 1994	(England) Karl Nicholls	Iwade Speedway	Practice session	
13 February 1994	(Italy) Remo Dal Bosco	Berlin-Wilmersdorf	Ice Racing Individual World Championship	
18 June 1996	(Russia) Rif Saitgareev	Ostrów Municipal Stadium	Polish league	
1 May 2002	(England) David Nix	Norfolk Arena	Conference League	
13 November 2005	(Australia) Ashley Jones	Myrtleford Speedway	Interstate Solo Challenge	
16 May 2006	(England) Chris Hendriksen	Wümmering	Speedway World Long-Track Championship	
27 May 2007	(Czech Republic) Michal Matula	Stadion MOSiR Krosno	Polish Speedway Championship, 2nd Division	
8 June 2007	(Sweden) Kenny Olsson	Norrköping Motorstadion	Swedish Speedway Championship, 2nd Division	
21 October 2007	(England) David Durham	Offerton	Grasstrack Midland Centre Championships	
25 May 2010	(England) Vincent Kinchin	Bergring Arena	Grasstrack ADAC Bergringpokal	
30 March 2011	(Sweden) Peter Koij	Västerås, Sweden	International Open Meeting	
12 May 2012	(England) Lee Richardson	Olympic Stadium, Wroclaw	100 Auto Cycle Union Star Championship	
8 December 2012	(Australia) Darrin Winkler	Maryborough Speedway	Frasercoast Christmas event	
3 April 2013	(Slovenia) Matija Duh	Bahia Blanca, Argentina	Argentinean International Speedway Championship	
22 June 2014	(Poland) Grzegorz Knapp	Heusden-Zolder Speedway	Dutch Speedway League	
28 May 2016	(Poland) Krystian Rempała	Rybnik Municipal Stadium	Polish Speedway Championship, 1st Division	
