= Arthur Jervis =

British motorcycle speedway rider

- Born: 26 February 1905; Coventry, England
- Died: 12 December 1987 (aged 82); St Ouen, Jersey, Channel Islands
- Nationality: British (English)

Career history
- 1929–1930: White City Manchester
- 1931: Leicester Super
- 1932: West Ham Hammers

Arthur Warden Jervis (26 February 1905 – 12 December 1987) was an international motorcycle speedway rider from England. He earned two international caps for the England national speedway team.

== Biography ==
Jervis, born in Coventry, rode in the pioneer years of British speedway, riding dirt track meetings in his home city of Coventry from the age of 14 and becoming champion of the Midlands and North in 1928. He also bought a garage in Coventry.

Jervis began his British leagues career riding for White City Manchester during the inaugural 1929 Speedway English Dirt Track League season. His two seasons with the Manchester club were chaotic because they withdrew from the league on both occasions. He also raced a couple of times for Belle Vue Aces.

In 1931, Leicester Super team manager Alec Jackson signed Jervis as the new captain, also signing Australian international Bruce McCullum, Tommy Price, Cliff Watson, and Alf Summersby. He enjoyed a full season of league racing for Leicester Super, recording an impressive 10.14 league average for the club. This was the second best league average behind Eric Langton.

Following the amalgamation of the Southern and Northern leagues for the 1932 Speedway National League season, Jervis moved to London to ride for the West Ham Hammers.

Jervis cut his speedway career short after the 1932 season. Despite being capped by England and still being in demand by teams, he chose to concentrate on his builder's business in Coventry.
