= Walter Creasor =

English footballer and speedway rider

Personal information
- Full name: Walter Cuthbert Creasor
- Date of birth: 31 October 1902
- Place of birth: Middlesbrough, Yorkshire, England
- Date of death: 18 November 1975 (aged 73)
- Place of death: Central Cleveland, (Note: Creasor's death was registered in the Central Cleveland registration district, which included such towns as Redcar and Stockton-on-Tees as well as Middlesbrough.) England
- Position: Outside left

Senior career*
Years	Team	Apps	(Gls)
1921–1922	Redcar		
1922–1923	Middlesbrough	0	(0)
1923–1924	Darlington	6	(1)
- * Club domestic league appearances and goals

Walter Creasor
- Born: 31 October 1902; Middlesbrough, Yorkshire, England
- Died: 18 November 1975 (aged 73)
- Nationality: British

Current club information
- Career status: Retired

Career history
- 1929: Halifax Speedway
- 1929: Newcastle

Walter Cuthbert Creasor (31 October 1902 – 18 November 1975) was an English footballer and speedway rider.

Creasor played as an outside left in the Football League for Darlington, and was on the books of Middlesbrough without representing them in the league. After finishing his football career, he took up speedway. He rode alongside his brother Fred for the Newcastle team in the 1929 English Dirt Track League.

== Life and career ==
Creasor was born in Middlesbrough, Yorkshire, the third child of John Thomas Creasor, a master butcher, and his wife Louisa. He began his football career at Northern League club Redcar, then joined the books of his hometown club, Middlesbrough F.C. the following season, and played for the reserve team in the North-Eastern League, but not for the Football League team. He signed for Third Division North club Darlington ahead of the 1923–24 season. Again, he played mostly for the club's reserve team, in benefit matches and in local cups, but he did make six league appearances, scoring once.

Creasor went on to take up motorcycle sports. Representing the Middlesbrough & District Motor Club, he and his older brother, Fred, reached the final of a six-a-side motorcycle football cup competition, organised under the auspices of the Auto-Cycle Union; Middlesbrough lost to Coventry Ace M.C. at Headingley, Leeds, in March 1927 after the first final, at Crystal Palace, London, was abandoned because of rain.

Creasor rode in the first speedway meeting in the north-east of England, at the Cleveland Park track, Middlesbrough, in August 1928. He rode in the 1929 Scottish Open, being eliminated in his heat by eventual winner Drew McQueen. He competed for Newcastle in the 1929 English Dirt Track League, and topped his team's averages. After Newcastle lost to Halifax in the semi-final of the English Dirt Track Knockout Cup, the winners borrowed Creasor for the final, a heavy defeat to Preston. In September 1929, he rode for Yorkshire against Lancashire at Wembley.

Creasor was a resident of Linthorpe, Middlesbrough, at the time of his death in November 1975 at the age of 73.
