= John Shuttleworth =

John Shuttleworth may refer to:

- John Shuttleworth (industrialist), Manchester Victorian industrialist
- The founder of Mother Earth News magazine
- John Shuttleworth (character), created by Graham Fellows
- John "Slider" Shuttleworth, British pioneer speedway rider
- A former member of Australian indie pop band The Stems
