= Leicester Super =

Motorcycle speedway team

Club information
- Track address: Leicester Super Speedway, Syston Sports Stadium; Melton Road, Leicester
- Country: England
- Founded: 1929
- Closed: 1931
- League: Northern League

Club facts
- Colours: Blue and White
- Track size: 586 yards (536 m)

Leicester Super Speedway
- Location: Leicester, England
- Operator: Speedways and Sports Ltd
- Opened: 1929
- Closed: 1936
- Major events: Speedway greyhound racing

Oval
- Length: 0.536 km (0.333 miles)
- Turns: 4 Turns

Leicester Super was a motorcycle speedway team based at the Leicester Super Speedway near Melton Road.

== History ==
Promotion company Speedways and Sports Ltd initially approached Leicestershire County Cricket Club in 1929 with a proposal to construct Leicester's second speedway track (after Leicester Stadium) around the edge of the pitch on Aylestone Road, but when this was rejected an alternative site near the tram terminus on Melton Road was used, the Syston Sports Stadium was built in just five weeks. The new Leicester Super Speedway was, at 586 yards in length the largest track used for league racing in the UK, races taking place over three laps rather than four as a consequence, and facilities included a 5,000-capacity grandstand built by local timber merchant George Walker. The track was officially opened on 18 May 1929 by the Lord Mayor of Leicester, the first meeting attracting a crowd of between 20,000 and 25,000, and featuring riders such as Lloyd "Sprouts" Elder and Stewie St. George.

Riders who appeared regularly at the track included Fred Wilkinson, Arthur Sherlock and Aubrey Williams. Leicester Super entered the English Knock-Out Cup in 1929, losing to Leicester Stadium in the first round in a match that was watched by 27,000 spectators.

The track also staged light car racing, and later greyhound racing.

Leicester Super joined the Northern League in 1930, recruiting Sherlock (who captained the team), Hal Herbert, George Marsh, and Alec Bowerman from Leicester Stadium, joining Wilkinson, Nev Wheeler, Bert Spencer, Harold Stevens, and Freddie Hore in the team. Herbert and Wilkinson were the top riders for the team in 1930. With several meetings affected by bad weather, the team failed to complete the full programme of meetings.

The track had an unprecedented ban on overtaking on the inside, due to the high speeds attained on the long straights, unless there was a minimum of four feet space on the inside of the rider in front.

Super remained in the Northern League in 1931, team manager Alec Jackson signing England international Arthur Jervis as the new captain, also signing Australian international Bruce McCullum, Tommy Price, Cliff Watson, and Alf Summersby. Falling attendances led to Super's withdrawal from the league in August.

Racing continued at the Super Speedway in 1932 in the form of 'pirate' meetings, with the last meeting held on 9 July.

Racing returned to Melton Road in 1936, with speedway and sidecar races in unsanctioned meetings, including appearances from Paddy Mills (riding under his real name, Horace Burke, to avoid being fined by the ACU) and Wilf Plant. Speedway was never revived again at the Super track, and the stadium was demolished.

== Season summary ==
Year and league	Position	Notes
1930 Speedway Northern League	6th	
1931 Speedway Northern League	4th	

== See also ==
- Speedway in Leicester
