= Tom Price =

Tom Price may refer to:

== People ==
=== Politicians ===
- Tom Price (South Australian politician) (1852–1909), premier of South Australia
- Tom Price (British politician) (1902–1973), British trade unionist and Labour Party politician
- Tom Price (American politician) (born 1954), former U.S. Secretary of Health and Human Services and former U.S. Representative

=== Sportspeople ===
- Tom Price (cricketer) (born 2000), English cricketer
- Tom Price (ice hockey) (born 1954), former ice hockey player
- Tom Price (rower) (born 1933), Olympic gold medalist in rowing 1952
- Tom Price (rugby union, born 1914) (1914–1991), English rugby union player
- Tom Price (rugby union, born 1993), British rugby player
- Tommy Price (born 1911) (1911–1997), British speedway rider
- Tommy Price (born 1907) (1907–1989), British speedway rider
- Tom Pryce (1949–1977), 1970's Formula One Driver

=== Other people ===
- Tom Price (actor) (born 1980), British actor
- Thomas Price (actor), professionally known as Tom Price, Hong Kong-born actor
- Tom Price (judge) (born 1945), American judge, served in the Texas Court of Criminal Appeals
- Tom Price (musician) (born 1956), American composer, arranger and conductor

== Places ==
- Tom Price, Western Australia, town named for Thomas Moore Price, an American businessman, and the highest town in Western Australia
  - Mount Tom Price mine, a nearby iron ore mine which is the reason for the town's existence

== Characters ==
- Tom Price, a character in the 1975 TV series Survivors and the 2008 remake
- Tom Price, a character in the TV series Somewhere Between

== See also ==
- Thomas Price (disambiguation)
- Tom Pryce (1949–1977), British racing driver
- Thomas Tannatt Pryce (1886–1918), Victoria Cross recipient
- Tom ap Rhys Pryce (1974–2006), British lawyer robbed and murdered by two teenagers
