= Thomas Price =

Thomas Price may refer to:

- Thomas Price (South Australian politician) (1852–1909), Premier of South Australia
- Thomas Price (bishop) (1599–1685), Church of Ireland archbishop of Cashel
- Thomas Price (Carnhuanawc) (1787–1848), Welsh literary figure of the early 19th century
- Thomas Price (Queensland politician) (1840–1906), Member of the Queensland Legislative Assembly, Australia
- Thomas Price (soldier) (1842–1911), Australian soldier
- Thomas Frederick Price (1860–1919), co-founder of the Catholic Foreign Mission Society of America, better known as the Maryknoll Fathers and Brothers
- Thomas J Price (born 1980), British sculptor
- Thomas L. Price (1809–1870), U.S. representative from Missouri
- Thomas M. Price (1916–1998), American architect
- Thomas Rowe Price Jr. (1898–1983), American investor and developer of the growth stock style of investing
- Thomas Phillips Price (1844–1932), Welsh landowner, mine owner and Liberal politician
- Thomas Price (Baptist minister) (1820–1888), Welsh Baptist minister
- Thommy Price (1956–2025), American rock drummer
- Tommy Price (speedway rider, born 1911) (1911–1998), speedway rider
- Tommy Price (speedway rider, born 1907) (1907–?), speedway rider
- Tomos Prys (c. 1564–1634), also Thomas Price, Welsh soldier, sailor and poet
- Thomas Price (colonial administrator), president of the British Virgin Islands
- Thomas Price (actor) (born 1985), Hong Kong-born actor
- Thomas Slater Price (1875–1949), British chemist
- Thomas Price (architect) (fl. 1846-1850), architect of Walkerville Brewery and other buildings in Adelaide, South Australia

== See also ==
- Tom Price (disambiguation)
- Thomas Pryce (disambiguation)
