= 1929 Speedway English Dirt Track League =

Annual British motorcycle speedway season

- League: English Dirt Track League
- No. of competitors: 11
- Champions: Leeds
- Knockout Cup: Preston
- Highest average: Syd Jackson
- Division/s other: 1929 Southern League

The 1929 English Dirt Track League was the inaugural season of speedway in the United Kingdom, featuring from Northern England. In the same year, the 1929 Speedway Southern League also commenced, catering to teams from Southern England The sport had been introduced to England in 1928 at High Beech Speedway.

== Summary ==
The season was marked by mid-season withdrawals, but Leeds were ultimately crowned champions. In 1930, the league was renamed the Northern League, thus existing for only one year. White City Speedway (Manchester) withdrew from the league following a dispute and would have been crowned champions if they had not withdrawn. At the time of their departure, they were leading the table by four points, having won 18 of their 20 matches.

The introduction of speedway in Middlesbrough at the Cleveland Park Stadium was a success with the team holding their first home fixture was on 16 May 1929 against Salford. However, on 12 July 1929, Dennis Atkinson suffered critical injuries following an accident at Cleveland Park, riding in a Golden Helmet meeting. He died the following day.

== Final table ==
Pos	Team	PL	W	D	L	Pts
1	Leeds	20	16	1	3	33
2	Preston	20	14	0	6	28
3	Halifax	19	12	1	6	25
4	Newcastle	20	10	0	10	20
5	Salford	20	10	0	10	20
6	Rochdale	20	9	1	19	19
7	Leicester Stadium	20	9	0	11	18
8	Liverpool	18	8	0	10	16
9	Sheffield	20	6	1	13	13
10	Middlesbrough	19	6	0	13	12
11	Barnsley Lundwood	20	6	0	14	12

Withdrawals (Records expunged) :

- Belle Vue Aces
- Bolton
- Burnley
- Hanley
- White City Speedway (Manchester)
- Warrington

== Fixtures & results ==
Home \ Away	BAR	HAL	LEE	LEI	LIV	MAN	MID	NEW	PRE	ROC	SAL	SHE	WAR
Barnsley Lundwood		23–40	26–36	36–27	30–27	30–32	40–22	32–22	32–31	26–36	24–31	37–24	38–24
Halifax	35–27		31–31	n/a	n/a	30–33	46–17	43–20	39–22	29–34	41–21	39–24	49–14
Leeds	38–24	42–21		50–13	36–27	29–33	41–21	41–22	42–21	43–20	46–16	47–16	46–16
Leicester	43–20	28–34	45–17		44–19	34–29	38–25	25–35	34–29	37–26	33–29	41–21	31–31
Liverpool	39–23	44–18	29–33	32–30		31–32	43–18	33–27	15–48	50–12	42–21	50–11	35–26
Manchester White City	48–15	40–22	44–19	50–10	n/a		47–16	47–16	48–14	45–18	42–20	51–12	50–12
Middlesbrough	48–15	28–35	30–33	37–24	n/a	n/a		20–42	37–25	33–29	44–18	43–18	38–25
Newcastle	36–26	37–23	23–37	44–18	41–19	n/a	39–24		26–36	40–22	41–20	44–19	n/a
Preston	45–18	35–28	35–27	39–24	52–11	26–37	46–15	51–11		36–27	38–24	46–16	47–14
Rochdale	48–15	33–28	31–32	39–24	43–20	36–27	39–24	40–22	33–29		37–26	31–31	35–28
Salford	46–17	38–25	41–22	43–18	41–21	n/a	36–27	33–28	31–32	39–24		41–22	27–36
Sheffield	34–26	24–39	28–35	23–40	42–21	n/a	46–17	36–27	30–33	43–19	46–16		52–11
Warrington	n/a	28–35	n/a	32–31	n/a	19–44	40–22	n/a	25–38	35–28	39–24	30–33	

Legend: Blue = home team win; Yellow = draw; Red = away team win.

== Top Five Riders ==
		Team	C.M.A.
1	Syd Jackson	Leicester	10.71
2	Joe Abbott	Burnley/Preston	10.50
3	Ham Burrill	Preston	9.44
4	Charlie Hornby	Warrington	8.88
5	Walter Creasor	Newcastle/Halifax	8.50

== English Dirt Track Knockout Cup ==
First round

Date	Team one	Score	Team two
03/08	Barnsley Lundwood	32–30	Sheffield
10/08	Rochdale	39–23	Salford
10/08	Sheffield	33–30	Barnsley Lundwood
13/08	Middlesbrough	25–38	Newcastle
16/08	Manchester White City	50–13	Warrington
21/08	Liverpool	16–47	Preston
22/08	Halifax	49–13	Leeds
22/08	Leicester Stadium	34–27	Leicester Super
22/08	Preston	44–19	Liverpool
23/08	Newcastle	38–24	Middlesbrough
23/08	Warrington	33–29	Manchester White City
24/08	Leeds	32–31	Halifax
24/08	Leicester Super	30–32	Leicester Stadium
24/08	Nottingham	35–23	Wombwell
26/08	Salford	37–26	Rochdale
29/08	Wombwell	38–24	Nottingham

Second round

Date	Team one	Score	Team two
12/09	Halifax	35–25	Wombwell
14/09	Rochdale	30–33	Leicester Stadium
16/09	Wombwell	31–31	Halifax
18/09	Sheffield	35–28	Preston
19/09	Leicester Stadium	35–27	Rochdale
19/09	Preston	55–11	Sheffield
	Manchester White City	w/o	Newcastle

Semifinals

Date	Team one	Score	Team two
19/09	Halifax	44–19	Newcastle
20/09	Newcastle	37–25	Halifax
21/09	Preston	48–14	Leicester Stadium
03/10	Leicester Stadium	39–24	Preston

=== Final ===
First leg

5 October 1929

Preston Frank Charles 12 Joe Abbott 10 Ham Burrill 8 Frank Chiswell 8 Jack Chiswell 7 Claude Rye 3	48 – 15	Halifax Walter Creasor 5 Bert Clayton 3 Geoff Taylor 2 Frank Smith 2 Geoff Kilburn 2 Jack Dudding 1

Farringdon Park

Second leg

9 October 1929

Halifax Cyril "Squib" Burton 7 George Reynard 6 Bert Clayton 4 Frank Smith 3 Arthur Atkinson 2 Jack Dudding 1	24 – 39	Preston Frank Chiswell 12 Frank Charles 10 Joe Abbott 6 Ham Burrill 5 Claude Rye 4 Len Myerscough 2

Sheffield

Preston were Knockout Cup winners, winning on aggregate 87–39.

== Riders ==
Barnsley

- Bob Allen
- Tommy Allott
- Albert Brown
- Bert Round
- Fred Ledger
- Reg Marshall
- Joe Mitchell
- Arthur Moore
- Tommy Thompson
- Charlie Ward

Halifax

- Arthur Atkinson
- Cyril "Squib" Burton
- Bert Clayton
- George Corney
- Walter Creasor
- Jack Duddings
- Dusty Haigh
- Geoff Kilburn
- George Reynard
- Frank Smith
- Geoff Taylor
- Alec Tidswell
- Geoff Wilson

Leeds

- Arthur Atkinson
- Dennis Atkinson
- Roy Barrowclough
- Tommy Bullus
- Billy Burrows
- Tommy Gamble
- George Greenwood
- Alec Hill
- Eric Langton
- Oliver Langton
- Arnold Moore
- John Scratcherd

Leicester

- Stan Baines
- Alec Bowerman
- Len Brown
- Squib Burton
- Billy Ellmore
- Jimmy Gent
- Dilly Gittins
- Hal Herbert
- Syd Jackson
- Nobby Kendrick
- Slider Shuttleworth
- Henry Taft

Liverpool

- Eric Blain
- Larry Boulton
- Crasher Coxhead
- Chris Hughes
- Eddie Myerscough
- Syd Plevin
- Thomas Arthur Price
- Les Wotton

Manchester White City (withdrew)

- Cyril "Squib" Burton
- Larry Boulton
- Billy Dallison
- Harry Gresty
- Walter Hull
- Syd Jackson
- Arthur Jervis
- Hugh Jervis
- Rex Kirby
- Jack Owen
- Skid Skinner
- Bunny Wilcox
- Tommy Withington
- Les Wotton

Middlesbrough

- James Allen
- Dick Bailey
- Charlie Barratt
- Billy Brown
- Dan Buck
- Ron Carling
- Edde Crenston
- Broncho Dixon
- Norman Evans
- Frank Harrison

Newcastle

- Phil Blake
- Gordon Byers
- Arnie Cattell
- Fred Creasor
- Walter Creasor
- Percy Dunn
- Charles Sanderson
- Roy Sanderson
- Ernie Smith
- Tommy Storey
- Bud Thompson

Preston

- Joe Abbott
- Bill Anderton
- Ham Burrill
- Frank Charles
- Jack Chiswell
- Frank Chiswell
- Doug Hutchings
- Jack Lund
- Len Mysercough
- Thomas Arthur Price
- Claude Rye

Rochdale

- Jack Atkinson
- Buster Breaks
- Cyril "Squib" Burton
- Ben Higginbottom
- Wally Hicklin
- Scott Michie
- Skid Nock
- Bud Proctor
- Fred Proctor
- Ron Thompson

Salford

- Hen Helsby
- Billy Howard
- Tommy Mason
- Ken Miller
- Sid Newiss
- Tommy Simpson
- A.J. Ward
- Cliff Watson
- Arthur Wilcock
- Cyril Wilcock
- Fred Williams

Sheffield

- Jack Barber
- Clem Beckett
- Frank Bianchi
- Johnny Broughton
- George Crawshaw
- Scotty Cummings
- Eric Hall
- Dusty Jenkins
- Arthur Longley
- Gus Platts
- W.S. Shuker
- Spencer Stratton
- Arthur Westwood

Warrington (withdrew)

- Cyril Crowther
- Norman Dawson
- Ezra Deakin
- Harold Formby
- Tommy Hach
- Charlie Horby
- Phil Hughes
- Alec McLachlan
- Tom Middlehurst
- George Milton
- Harry Solomon
- Jack Wood

== See also ==
- List of United Kingdom Speedway League Champions
