= 1935 English Greyhound Derby =

- Location: White City Stadium
- End date: 6 July
- Total prize money: £1,050 (winner)

The 1935 Greyhound Derby took place during June & July with the final being held on 6 July 1935 at White City Stadium. The winner Greta Ranee received a first prize of £1,050 and the attendance was 88,700.

== Final result ==
At White City (over 525 yards):

Position	Name of Greyhound	Breeding	Trap	SP	Time	Trainer
1st	Greta Ranee	Doumergue - Parrein	3	4-1	30.18	Albert Jonas (White City - London)
2nd	Curleys Fancy II	Mutton Cutlet - Delenette	1	2-1f	30.24	Joe Harmon (Wimbledon)
3rd	Stout Heart	Macoma - Fickle Fame	6	5-2	30.30	Bill Cowell (White City - London)
4th	Bosham	Hertford - White Cap	5	100-8	30.42	Leslie Reynolds (White City - London)
5th	Maidens Delight	Maidens Boy - Springfield Sal	4	7-1	30.50	S Young (Private)
6th	Fresh Judgement	Macoma - Poachers Lass	2	8-1	30.66	Johnny Bullock (White City - London)

=== Distances ===
¾, ¾, 1½, 1, 2 (lengths)
The distances between the greyhounds are in finishing order and shown in lengths. From 1927 to 1950 one length was equal to 0.06 of one second but race times are shown as 0.08 as per modern day calculations.

== Review ==
The entries for the 1935 Derby included Brilliant Bob quoted at 10–1, the 1934 English Greyhound Derby runner up Grey Raca (10-1) and the veteran Wild Woolley (25-1), competing in his fourth Derby. Ante-post favourite was Curleys Fancy II at 4–1.

The first round heats would be staged over one week and the very first heat saw Grey Raca run last place in a four dog heat won by Ataxy. Ataxy had never run at White City before and recorded a fast 29.93. Wild Woolley failed to progress and was then retired while 1934 finalist Kumm on Steve just made it through. A bitch called Greta Ranee finished well to catch Curleys Fancy II in the fastest time of the round (29.70).

Two nights later the second round started and Greta Ranee was defeated by 10-1 shot Stout Heart in 29.64, the second fastest time ever recorded at White City. Brilliant Bob progressed but both Kumm On Steve and Ataxy failed to progress.

The first semi-final was marred by trouble in which Greta Ranee came out best winning from Stout Heart and Fresh Judgement, Brilliant Bob was eliminated which angered the crowd because they wanted a re-run. Curleys Fancy II came back to form with a win in the second semi-final in 29.86, three lengths ahead of Gold Collar champion Bosham. Wimbledon two year old produce champion Maidens Delight took the final qualifying place. As the draw for the final was being conducted the crowd booed following the problems encountered in the first semi-final.

A record crowd of 88,700 attended the final night and there was still debate about wide runners being seeded due to the semi-final incident, a rule change that the Greyhound Express backed. As the traps went up in the final Stout Heart and Curleys Fancy II vied for the lead until the back straight when they were joined by Greta Ranee, as the three came round the final bend, Greta Ranee challenged strongly and beat Curleys Fancy II by ¾ length on the line, with Stout Heart a further ¾ length behind in third place. Greta Ranee, owned by surgeon John Percy Lockhart-Mummery, became the first bitch to win the Greyhound Derby. Further controversy ensued because many of the paying spectators thought that Curleys Fancy had been fought by Stout Heart at the third bend and they jeered after the race.

== See also ==
- 1935 UK & Ireland Greyhound Racing Year
