= Ray Duggan =

Australian speedway rider

- Born: 22 December 1918; West Maitland, New South Wales
- Died: 20 January 1950 (aged 31); Sydney, New South Wales
- Nationality: Australian

Career history
- 1938–1939: New Cross Rangers
- 1947–1949: Harringay Racers

Team honours
- 1948: Anniversary Cup winner

Raymond Patrick Duggan (22 December 1918 – 20 January 1950) was an Australian motorcycle speedway rider. He first rode in the United Kingdom with the New Cross Lambs. Duggan represented the Australia many times at test level and was the younger brother of five times Australian champion Vic Duggan. Duggan was killed in arguably speedway's worst crash on 20 January 1950, which also saw fellow Australian Norman Clay lose his life.

== Career ==
Duggan was noticed by the England captain Jack Parker riding in Australia in early 1938. He persuaded Duggan and fellow Australian Frank Dolan to travel with him to the United Kingdom. He started his career in 1938 with the New Cross Rangers. In 1947, he returned to the UK with the Harringay Racers.

Duggan never became Australian National Champion with his best finish being third on three occasions in 1947, 1948 and 1949. The 1947 event was behind his brother Vic Duggan and Lionel Van Praag, the inaugural World Champion.

== Death ==
On 20 January 1950, Duggan was killed at the Sydney Sports Ground after being involved in a high-speed crash with friend Norman Clay. Clay also died from his injuries.

== See also ==
- List of rider deaths in motorcycle speedway
