= Ernie Roccio =

American speedway rider

- Born: 16 September 1927; Los Angeles
- Died: 22 July 1952 (aged 24); West Ham Stadium
- Nationality: American

Career history
- 1950–1952: Wimbledon Dons

Individual honours
- 1951: Speedway World Championship finalist

Team honours
- 1950, 1951: National Trophy Winner

Ernest Thomas Roccio (16 September 1927 – 22 July 1952) was a motorcycle speedway rider from the United States.

== Speedway career ==
Roccio was a leading speedway rider in the early 1950s. He reached the final of the Speedway World Championship in the 1951 Individual Speedway World Championship.

Roccio rode in the top tier of British Speedway, riding for Wimbledon Dons. Previously, he had raced for the Shelbourne Tigers in Dublin along with his brother John Roccio. While riding for Wimbledon on 22 July 1952, he was killed after crashing into the fence at high speed at West Ham Stadium, it has been reported that he died instantly but the newspaper report states he died in hospital.

== World Final Appearances ==
- 1951 - (England) London, Wembley Stadium - 15th - 2pts

== See also ==
Rider deaths in motorcycle speedway
