= 1935 Irish Greyhound Derby =

Irish greyhound race

- Venue: Shelbourne Park
- Location: Dublin
- End date: 10 August 1935

The 1935 Irish Greyhound Derby took place during August with the final being held at Shelbourne Park in Dublin on August 10.

The winner was Roving Yank who was owned by Billy Dunne and trained by Tom Harty.

== Final result ==
At Shelbourne Park, 10 August (over 525 yards):

Position	Name of Greyhound	Breeding	Trap	SP	Time (sec)	Trainer
1st	Roving Yank	Roving Bunty – Yankey Land	3	1/1f	30.18	Tom Harty
2nd	Roving Spring	Roving Bunty – Housekeeper	1	4/1	30.60	T C Ryan
3rd	Tullyglass Bramble	Ormac – Ballyring Lass	2	7/2	30.62	K O'Callaghan
4th	Received With Thanks	Egyptian Bank – Carnahalla	5	10/1		Joe McKenna
5th	Swift Brown Lady	Mutton Cutlet - Swift Lady	4	8/1		J Landy
6th	Lisnagree	Runaway – Romom's Pet	6	8/1		J Daly

== Distances ==
6, head, (lengths) 0.07 sec = length

== Semi finals ==
First semi final (3 Aug)
Pos	Name of Greyhound	SP	Time
1st	Roving Spring	5/1	30.46
2nd	Roving Yank	4/5f	
3rd	Maghereagh Soldier	5/2	
4th	Camblin Worker	20/1	
5th	Bawn na Haigue	7/1	
6th	Looky Lad	20/1	

Second semi final (3 Aug)
Pos	Name of Greyhound	SP	Time
1st	Tyllyglass Bramble	7/4	30.68
2nd	Lisnagree	5/1	
3rd	Mac's Sandy	8/1	
4th	Spark's Bridge	10/1	
5th	Ocean Gallant	5/2	
6th	Ropewalk King	4/1	

Third semi final (5 Aug)
Pos	Name of Greyhound	SP	Time
1st	Swift Brown Lady	4/1	30.75
2nd	Received With Thanks	7/2	
3rd	Welcome Wind	4/1	
4th	Ryland Roddy	8/1	
5th	Dicas	2/1f	
6th	Negro's Equal	4/1	

== Competition Report ==
In the first two semi-finals on 3 August Roving Spring beat his half-brother Roving Yank in a time of 30.46 and Tullyglass Bramble won by two lengths from Lisnagree in 30.60. On 5 August Received With Thanks and Swift Brown Lady took the remaining two final places. The final resulted in an easy win for Roving Yank leading early and stretching his lead to six lengths at the finish. Tullyglass Bramble finished well to take third place behind Roving Spring in second place.

== See also ==
- 1935 UK & Ireland Greyhound Racing Year
