= Norman Clay =

Australian speedway rider

- Born: 27 May 1922; Sydney, Australia
- Died: 21 January 1950 (aged 27); Sydney, Australia
- Nationality: Australian

Career history
- 1948–1949: Exeter Falcons

Team honours
- 1948: League champion (tier 3)

Norman Bernard Clay (27 May 1922 – 21 January 1950) was an Australian motorcycle speedway rider. He earned two international caps for the Australia national speedway team. Clay was killed in arguably speedway's worst crash on 20 January 1950, which also saw fellow Australian Ray Duggan lose his life.

== Biography ==
Clay, born in Sydney, Australia, raced in Australia during World War II in the Inter-District League Premiership, riding for Eastern Suburbs and after the war signed to ride for influential promoter Johnnie Hoskins. However, it was not until 1948 that he was one of three Australian riders brought over to race in British speedway by the Exeter Falcons manager Frank Buckland for the 1948 season, the others being Hugh Geddes and Keith Gurtner.

Clay had gained a significant reputation in Australia and he began his British leagues career riding for Exeter during the 1948 Speedway National League Division Three season. He was an instant hit, recording a 8.73 average from 51 matches and this helped Exeter win the 1948 Speedway National League Division Three.

The following season, Clay remained with Exeter for the 1949 Speedway National League Division Three campaign and set an impressive 9.77 average from 42 matches, the fourth highest in the entire division. He also became the club captain and equalled the track record of 76 seconds at the County Ground Stadium.

== Family and death ==
On 20 January 1950, Clay and fellow Australian Ray Duggan were both killed at the Sydney Sports Ground after a crash in heat 8. Clay was leading the race but caught a deep grove throwing him off the bike, which started a chain reaction. Duggan ran into him and fell on his head before a third rider Donald Lawson hit Duggan's bike. All three were taken to St. Vincent Hospital in Sydney but Duggan was pronounced dead on arrival and Clay died the following morning. Lawson suffered serious facial injuries.

Clay's older brother Sidney was a speedway rider and mechanic and drowned in 1939 after being swept out to sea while fishing.

== See also ==
- List of rider deaths in motorcycle speedway
