= Halifax Speedway =

Former motorcycle speedway team

Halifax Speedway (Thrum Hall)

Club information
- Track address: Thrum Hall Cricket Ground; Spring Hall Lane; Halifax, West Yorkshire
- Country: England
- Founded: 1928
- Closed: 1930
- League: English Dirt Track League

Halifax Speedway were a British motorcycle speedway team who operated between 1928 and 1930 and were based at Thrum Hall Cricket Ground, Spring Hall Lane, Halifax, West Yorkshire. England.

== History ==
The Thrum Hall cricket ground had a dirt track constructed around the cricket pitch in 1928 by the Halifax District Cycle and Light Car Club. The first dirt track event (speedway) held at the track was on 2 May 1928.

The speedway team arrived and competed in the inaugural 1929 Speedway English Dirt Track League, with the first home league fixture being held at the track on 27 April 1929 against White City Speedway (Manchester), in front of 6,000 spectators. The team finished the season in third place.

Halifax decided not to enter a team for the 1930 season and the following year the track was demolished to make way for a greyhound track that became the Halifax Greyhound Stadium.

== Season summary ==
Year and league	Position	Notes
1929 Speedway English Dirt Track League	3rd	only league season
