= Syston =

Town in Charnwood, Leicestershire, England

Coordinates: 52.7°N 1.08°W

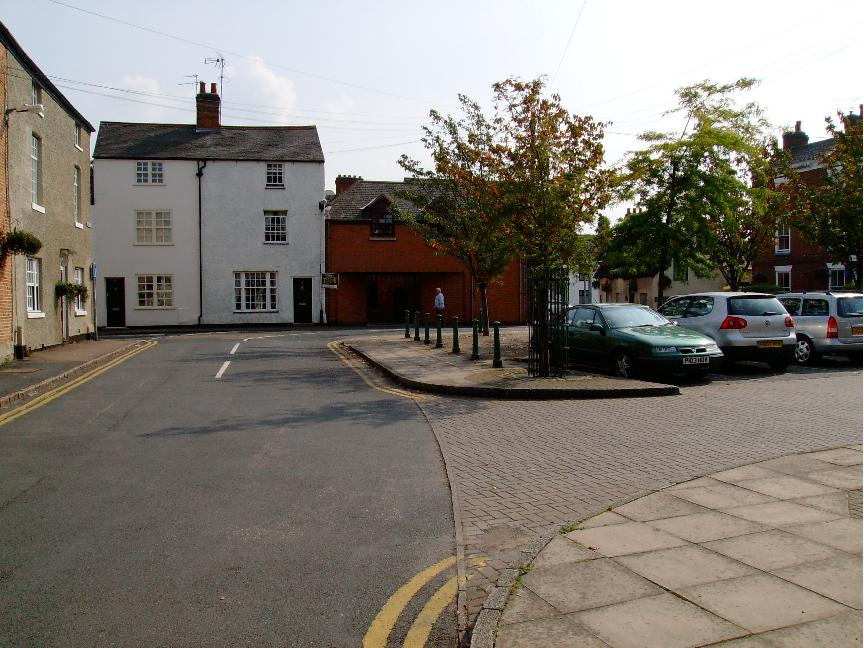
- The Green, Syston

- Location within Leicestershire
- Population: 12,804 (2011 Census)
- OS grid reference: SK621118
- District: Charnwood
- Shire county: Leicestershire
- Region: East Midlands
- Country: England
- Sovereign state: United Kingdom
- Post town: LEICESTER
- Postcode district: LE7
- Dialling code: 0116
- Police: Leicestershire
- Fire: Leicestershire
- Ambulance: East Midlands
- UK Parliament: Melton and Syston

Syston (/ˈsaɪstən/ SY-stən) is a town and civil parish in the district of Charnwood in Leicestershire, England. The population was 11,508 at the 2001 census, rising to 12,804 at the 2011 census.

== Overview ==
The name Syston derives from an Old English personal name and tūn meaning 'settlement'. The exact personal name is uncertain but could be Sigehaeth or Sigethryth.

There has been a settlement on the site for over 1,000 years, the earliest records being in the Domesday Book as Sitestone. The Roman road known as the Fosse Way passes through Syston, which is now largely a commuter town for the city of Leicester. Only the village of Thurmaston to the south separates it from Leicester.

The large and impressive Church of St Peter and St Paul is the most ancient building in Syston, built in pink granite and white limestone with a proud west tower topped by a lozenge frieze, battlements and pinnacles. The church mostly dates from the 15th century but there is a 13th-century sedilia in the chancel and a tomb recess in the south aisle of the early 14th century. The stone arcading inside the nave has striking Perpendicular Gothic panelling which is also seen on the tower arch and in the clerestory. The nave roof of timber is also 15th century. The local architect Frederick Webster Ordish (1821–1885) extensively restored the church in 1871–72 and in 1881 he extended the nave by one bay and rebuilt the chancel. Ordish lived at Queniborough Old Hall. In 1855 he had added the upper storey, with its tower and bridge staircase, to the Corn Exchange in Leicester Market Place. He died as a result of an accident near the old Syston railway station in September 1885.

Motorcycle speedway (1930–1931) and greyhound racing (1931–1960s) were staged at the Syston Sports Stadium on Mostyn Avenue.

The 'Syston white plum' is well known in the Syston locality and has been grown there for well over 100 years. It is yellow, oval in shape, thin skinned and a good sized dessert plum. It normally crops in September and is emblazoned on the Syston Town welcoming signs.

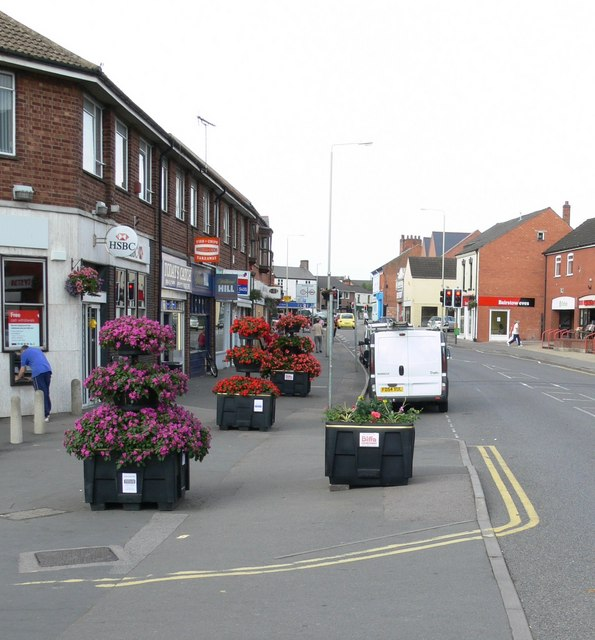
Melton Road from the Brook Bridge.

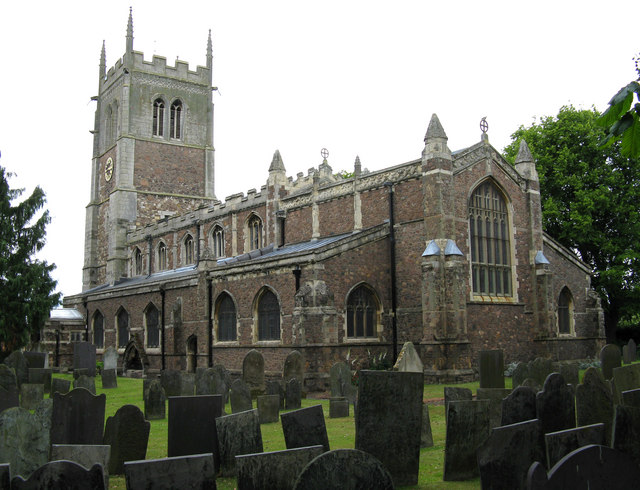
Church of St Peter and St Paul, Syston. The church is mostly of the 15th century.

== Economy ==
Syston is the location of the headquarters of Pukka Pies, which is one of the largest employers in the town, employing 250 people. Syston is home to a monthly community newspaper, Syston Town News. Dunelm Group began in the town.

== Geography ==
The Midland Main Line runs through the town. Syston railway station currently has one platform on what remains of the former goods line, served by local Leicester to Lincoln via Nottingham and Newark services on the Ivanhoe Line.

The River Soar runs past the western edge of the town, shortly after passing under the A46 road which underwent significant improvements early in 2006 at the Hobby Horse roundabout, a popular meeting place on the Leicester Western Bypass.

The main bypass opened on July 31 1969.

== Notable residents ==
- Singer Dave Bartram from Showaddywaddy
- Singer Mahalia Burkmar
- Actress Terri Dwyer
- Megan Lowe, Test cricketer
- Rachel Parris, comedian, musician, improviser and presenter
- Luke Thomas, footballer
- Speedway racer Fred Wilkinson

== Twin towns ==
- Déville-lès-Rouen, Upper Normandy, France

== Local organisations ==
The Air Training Corps (ATC) is a military based youth organisation for 13- to 20-year-olds and the local squadron (No 1181 Syston Squadron) is based in the grounds of Wreake Valley Academy.

The Syston Allotment Society works for the benefit of plot holders and the wider community at the allotment site on Upper Church Street, Syston.

Syston Sailing Club, in Fosse Way, runs learn-to sail courses for newcomers, and racing and social sailing for members. It is affiliated to the RYA.

== Sources ==
- Pevsner, Nikolaus; Williamson, Elizabeth (revision) (1984) [1960]. Leicestershire and Rutland. The Buildings of England. Harmondsworth: Penguin Books. pp. 402–403. ISBN 0140710183.
- Brodie, Antonia; Felstead, Alison; Franklin, Jonathan; Pinfield, Leslie; Oldfield, Jane, eds. (2001). Directory of British Architects 1834-1914, Vol.2, L-Z. London & New York: Continuum. p. 289. ISBN 082645514X.
