= Hal Herbert (speedway rider) =

British motorcycle speedway rider

- Born: 3 April 1907; Rearsby, Leicester, England
- Died: July 1982 (aged 75); Leicester
- Nationality: British (English)

Career history
- 1929: Leicester Stadium
- 1930–1931: Leicester Super
- 1931: Stamford Bridge Pensioners
- 1933: Wembley Lions

William Harold Herbert (3 April 1907 – July 1982) was an international motorcycle speedway rider from England. He earned one international cap for the England national speedway team.

== Biography ==
Herbert, born in Leicester, was a blacksmith in the village of Rearsby before he rode in the pioneer years of British speedway beginning his British leagues career riding for Leicester Stadium, during the inaugural 1929 Speedway English Dirt Track League.

The following season in 1930, Herbert rode for the other speedway team in Leicester called Leicester Super. In June 1930, he was selected to ride for England against Australia at the Olympic Park Speedway in Nottingham.

Herbert remained with Leicester Super for the start of 1931 and went on to record an average of 7.31. However, the Leicester team failed to fulfill all of their fixtures and withdrew from the league before the end of the season, forcing Herbert to negotiate a contract with Stamford Bridge Pensioners for the remainder of the season.

On the creation of the National League in 1932, Herbert chose to sit out the league matches in favour of riding in challenge, exhibition and unlicensed events. He joined Wembley Lions in 1933 but underachieved and was released after the season.

Throughout 1934 and 1935, Herbert rode in several challenge events before retiring to become a motor mechanic by trade.
