= Claude Rye =

British speedway rider

- Born: 13 January 1908; Fulham, London, England
- Died: 18 October 1988 (aged 80)
- Nationality: British (English)

Career history
- 1929–1930: Preston
- 1931–1937: Wimbledon Dons

Individual honours
- 1933: Dirt Track Championnat du Monde

Team honours
- 1929: English Dirt Track KO Cup Winner

Arthur Claude Rye known as Claude Rye (13 January 1908 – 18 October 1988) was an international speedway rider from England. He earned four international caps for the England national speedway team.

== Speedway career ==
Rye came to prominence in 1929 after gaining a two-year contract with Preston (speedway) and then joined Wimbledon Dons in 1931.

In 1933, Rye won the Dirt Track Championnat du Monde (an early version of the Speedway World Championship and rival of the Star Riders' Championship) at Stade Buffalo in Paris during 1933. However, it was also during 1933 that he broke a leg in his first Test appearance for England.

Rye became the captain of Wimbledon and finished second in the league averages during the 1933 Speedway National League. He competed in the 1934 Star Riders' Championship and went on to represent England against the United States and Australia.

== Personal life ==
Rye was the Managing Director of one of Britain's largest ball bearing firms and became a Freeman of the City of London.

== Film appearance ==
The speedway scenes from the 1933 film Britannia of Billingsgate were shot at Hackney Wick Stadium and featured some of the leading riders in Britain at the time including Rye, Colin Watson, Arthur Warwick, Gus Kuhn, Tom Farndon and Ron Johnson.

== Players cigarette cards ==
Rye is listed as number 39 of 50 in the 1930s Player's cigarette card collection.
