= John Berry (speedway promoter) =

British motorcycle speedway promoter and manager

- Born: William John Berry; 16 October 1944; London, England
- Died: 3 August 2012 (aged 67); Perth, Australia
- Occupations: Speedway promoter and team manager, writer

William John Berry (16 October 1944 – 3 August 2012), better known as John Berry, was a speedway promoter, team manager, and writer who revived the Ipswich Witches in 1969 and managed the England national speedway team during three spells, from 1975 to 1976, 1977 to 1978 and again from 1984 to 1985.

== Biography ==
Berry was born in Westminster Hospital in 1944 and grew up in Edmonton. He was educated at the Edmonton County Grammar School before studying for a degree in Food Technology. His first business venture was a fish and chip shop in London's East End.

Along with his school friend turned business partner Joe Thurley, Berry brought speedway back to Ipswich in 1969 by building a new track at Foxhall Stadium inside the old one which had been covered in tarmac for stock car racing. Their application for a licence to compete in the second division of the British League was initially turned down by fellow promoters as they were considered to lack sufficient experience, but later accepted, and Ipswich joined the top division in 1972, taking the place of West Ham Hammers. Recruiting a team of riders largely from the Ipswich area, the Witches were one of the most successful teams of the 1970s and early 1980s, winning the British League in 1975, 1976, and 1984, and finishing as runners-up in 1981 and 1983.

Berry went on to manage the England team, taking over from Reg Fearman in 1975 and continuing until 1977, and returning to the role in 1978 and 1979. He managed the England team again in from 1984 to 1985 and managed a National League representative team in a series against Poland in 1987. In the mid-1980s he was considered for a position in overall charge of the British speedway, but did not get the full support of fellow promoters. He was instrumental in introducing Billy Sanders to British speedway in 1972, and after Sanders' death in 1985, Berry retired from his position as Ipswich promoter. He returned to speedway first as a consultant and then promoter for the Wimbledon Dons in the 1987 season. He emigrated to Australia in 1989. He wrote two books about his time in British speedway, Confessions of a Speedway Promoter and More Confessions. He was also a columnist for the speedway magazine Backtrack.

Berry died on 3 August 2012 at his home in Perth, Australia, aged 67.

== Publications ==
- Confessions of a Speedway Promoter (2004)
- More Confessions (2004)
- Sliding into Hell (2005) (fiction)
