= 1931 Irish Greyhound Derby =

1931 National Derby
- Venue: Harold's Cross Stadium
- Location: Dublin
- End date: 21 August

The 1931 National Derby took place during August with the final being held at Harold's Cross Stadium in Dublin on 21 August 1931. It was the fourth and last edition of the event before it took the mantle of the official Irish Greyhound Derby. The race at this stage was considered unofficial because it had not been ratified by the Irish Coursing Club.

The winner was Little Chummie, trained by Billy Quinn and owned and bred by Michael Grace from (Callan). The brindle dog born in June 1928 also won the National Cup at Shelbourne Park and the Lincoln Cup at Wembley.

== Final result ==
At Harolds Cross, 21 August (over 525 yards):

Position	Winner	Breeding	Trap	SP	Time	Trainer
1st	Little Chummie	Bottle - Coolalong Girl	3	6-4	29.93	Billy Quinn
2nd	Yankee Speed	unknown	2	4-5f	30.17	
3rd	Long May She Live	unknown	1	100-7		
unplaced	Jack Knows	unknown	4	7-1		
unplaced	Queen of the Hill	unknown	5	10-1		

=== Distances ===
3 (lengths)

== See also ==
- 1931 UK & Ireland Greyhound Racing Year
