= Fred Wilkinson (speedway rider) =

British motorcycle speedway rider

- Born: 8 June 1906; Coalville, Leicestershire, England
- Died: 24 September 1978 (aged 72); Syston, Leicestershire, England
- Nationality: British (English)

Career history
- 1929–1931: Leicester Super
- 1929, 1931: Coventry Bees
- 1932: Sheffield Tigers
- 1933: Nottingham

Fred Wilkinson (8 June 1906 – 24 September 1978) was a British motorcycle speedway rider who rode in the early years of the sport. He earned two international caps for the England national speedway team.

== Biography ==
Wilkinson was born in Coalville, Leicestershire in 1906, his father a miner at a local colliery. The family moved to Binley near Coventry, and then Seend in Wiltshire, with Wilkinson starting his racing career in grasstrack races. His early speedway experience was at the Gorse Hill Autodrome in Swindon, and at Bristol.

In 1929, Wilkinson signed for the Leicester Super team, also riding for Coventry Bees, settling in Syston, Leicestershire, where he ran a garage. He captained the Leicester Super team in 1930, and stayed with the team until it closed during the 1931 Speedway Northern League.

Wilkinson rode for England in the second Test match of 1931 against Australia, staged at Leicester Super Speedway, scoring three points. He was selected at reserve for the fourth test at Hyde Road but did not score from his one ride.

Wilkinson moved on to ride for Sheffield in 1932, but they withdrew mid-season, leaving him racing a series of individual, special and challenge events only.

Wilkinson was commemorated by an event in the 1980s that bore his name: The Fred Wilkinson Trophy match was staged at Leicester Stadium between 1980 and 1983, with a further staging at Peterborough in 1985.
