= Salford (speedway) =

Motorcycle speedway team

Club information
- Track address: Albion Greyhound Racecourse; Cromwell Road; Salford
- Country: England
- Founded: 1928
- Closed: 1930
- League: English Dirt Track League

Salford were a British speedway team from Salford, Greater Manchester, England, that competed in the English Dirt Track League in the inaugural season of British Speedway in 1929.

== History ==
In 1928 the new sport known as dirt track arrived from Australia and immediately became a popular sport. Manchester had already seen the introduction of speedway at both the White City Stadium (on 16 June 1928) and the Belle Vue Stadium (on 28 July 1928).

Salford joined the new sports boom when dirt track racing began on 27 August 1928 at the recently constructed Albion Greyhound Racecourse in Cromwell Road, with Eric Langton winning the Castle Irwell Scratch event.

The following year a team was formed and they were founder members of the English Dirt Track League (effectively the Northern League). The team finished in fifth place during the 1929 Speedway English Dirt Track League.

The team was closed down in September 1929, which led to the team's riders running the track themselves under the name Salford Speedway but the venture failed and speedway ended at the stadium after the 18 October fixture.

== Season summary ==
Year and league	Position	Notes
1929 Speedway English Dirt Track League	5th	only season
