= Ham Burrill =

British speedway rider

- Born: 5 August 1903; St Helens, Lancashire, England
- Died: 3 September 1978 (aged 75); Rhuddlan, Clwyd, Wales
- Nationality: British (English)

Career history
- 1929–1930, 1931: Preston (speedway)
- 1930: Liverpool

Team honours
- 1929: English Dirt Track KO Cup Winner

Hamlet Burrill known as Ham Burrill (1903–1978) was an international speedway rider from England.

== Speedway career ==
Burrill came to prominence in 1929 when he became the Preston (speedway) captain for the inaugural season of the 1929 Speedway English Dirt Track League. He became the fans favourite and finished third in the averages with an impressive 9.44. He helped Preston win the English Dirt Track Knockout Cup and finish runner-up in the league.

In September 1930, Burrill signed for Liverpool but was riding once again for Preston in 1931. He was selected for England against Germany in 1930.

== Personal life ==
In 1939, Burrill was appointed Deputy Chief Officer of the Yiewsley and West Drayton Fire Brigade, he had been a member of the Whiston Fire Brigade for five years at the time.
