= Frank Dolan =

Australian motorcycle speedway rider

- Born: 2 April 1915; Sydney, Australia
- Died: 12 July 1988 (aged 73)
- Nationality: Australian

Career history
- 1938–1939, 1947–1948: Harringay Tigers
- 1938: Lea Bridge Cubs
- 1938: Southampton Saints

Individual honours
- 1946: Australian Solo Championship

Team honours
- 1948: Anniversary Cup

Francis Owen Dolan (2 April 1915 – 12 July 1988) was an Australian motorcycle speedway rider. He was champion of Australia in 1946 and earned eight international caps for the Australia national speedway team.

== Biography ==
Dolan, born in Sydney, was noticed by the England captain Jack Parker riding in Australia in early 1938. He persuaded Dolan and fellow Australian Ray Duggan to travel with him to the United Kingdom. He began his British leagues career riding for Harringay Tigers during the 1938 Speedway National League season but was then loaned out to Southampton Saints and Lea Bridge Cubs.

In 1939, Dolan rode for Harringay but then lost six years of his career due to World War II. However, in 1946, he returned and gained significant success when he the Australian Solo Championship.

On his return to British speedway in 1947, Dolan was once again a Harringay rider and averaged a respectable 8.05 for the season. His final season in 1948, saw him win the Anniversary Cup with Harringay.
