= White City Speedway (Manchester) =

Defunct British motorcycle speedway team

Club information
- Track address: White City Stadium (Manchester); Chester Road; Old Trafford; Greater Manchester, England
- Country: England
- Founded: 1928
- Closed: 1930
- League: English Dirt Track League; Northern League

White City Speedway (Manchester) were a British motorcycle speedway team who operated between 1928 and 1930 and were based at White City Stadium (Manchester), Chester Road, Old Trafford, Greater Manchester, England.

== History ==
In 1928 the new sport known as dirt track arrived from Australia and immediately became a popular sport. Manchester would see the introduction of speedway at three venues, the first at the White City Stadium on 16 June 1928. Belle Vue Stadium (on 28 July 1928) would follow, as would Salford on 27 August 1928.

The following year a team was formed and they were founder members of the English Dirt Track League (effectively the Northern League). During the 1929 Speedway English Dirt Track League season, the team led the league table by four points, having won 18 of their 20 matches, but following a dispute, they withdrew from the league handing Leeds the title.

The club closed in 1930 but was revived for a meeting in 1958.

== Season summary ==
Year and league	Position	Notes
1929 Speedway English Dirt Track League	N/A	withdrew, results expunged
1930 Speedway Southern League	3rd	withdrew, results stood

== Notable riders ==
- (England) Billy Dallison
- (Australia) Max Grosskreutz
- (England) Les Wotton
