= Shotts Gasworks Park Greyhound Track =

Greyhound racing track in Shotts, Scotland

- Location: Shotts, North Lanarkshire, Scotland
- Coordinates: 55°49′02″N 3°47′49″W
- Opened: 1934
- Closed: 1939

Shotts Gasworks Park Greyhound Track was a greyhound racing track in Shotts, North Lanarkshire, Scotland.

The mining communities of Shotts were instrumental in bringing greyhound racing to Shotts. The first track in the town was situated off Station Road just south of Foundry Road and was around the Gasworks Park football pitch, home to Shotts Battlefield FC.

Racing took place from 20 August 1934 and during November 1936 there was a petition signed by 1,014 people in support of the dog track because the General Purposes Committee of Lanark County Council refused to grant Thomas Rae a betting licence for the track. The track which remained independent (not affiliated to a governing body) closed on 11 March 1939 and moved to a new site called Shotts Stadium.
