= Mexborough Greyhound Stadium =

Former greyhound racing stadium

- Location: Mexborough, South Yorkshire
- Coordinates: 53°30′08″N 1°16′41″W
- Opened: c.1935
- Closed: 1965

Mexborough Greyhound Stadium also called the Dog Daisy Stadium was a greyhound racing stadium located in Mexborough, South Yorkshire.

== Origins ==
The stadium was constructed on farmland north of the town of Mexborough and was accessed from tracks heading from Adwick Road (from the west) and Harlington Road (from the south). The stadium is believed to have been constructed during the 1930s and applied for a betting licence in 1935 under the Betting and Lotteries Act 1934.

== Greyhound racing ==
The racing was independent (not affiliated to the sports governing body the National Greyhound Racing Club).

The stadium came under new management in December 1961, when the Mexborough Greyhound Stadium and Sports Club was headed by Michael Coates and William Lawrence Lee.

In January 1963, Coates and Lee installed new lighting and added a licensed club house.

== Closure ==
The track closed during 1965 and was demolished to make way for housing.
