= John "Slider" Shuttleworth =

British motorcycle speedway rider

Slider Shuttleworth
- Born: 6 February 1895; Stockport, Cheshire, England
- Died: December 1970 (aged 75)
- Nationality: British (English)

Career history
- 1929–1930: Leicester Stadium

John Charles Starkie Shuttleworth (6 February 1895 – December 1970) better known as Slider Shuttleworth in speedway circles was a British motorcycle speedway rider.

== Career ==
Shuttleworth rode for the Leicester Stadium team in the pioneer years of the sport in Britain.

Shuttleworth rode in some of the earliest speedway races in Britain, including races at Audenshaw in 1928. The following year in 1929, he rode in various individual meetings before joining the Leicester Stadium team during the 1929 Speedway English Dirt Track League season.

In 1930, Shuttleworth only represented the team once, in a challenge match against Nottingham. This was partly due to the fact that he received a suspension from the A.C.U. for riding on an unauthorised track.

Shuttleworth was known for his practical jokes, one of which was to place a small balloon full of red ink inside his crash helmet, giving the appearance of blood should he fall and bang his head, which he would often do for dramatic effect if he was losing a race. He earned the nickname the Darling of Cologne after breaking the track record at the German track.

Shuttleworth retired from speedway in 1931 in order to find a steady job and to avoid risking his life riding bikes.
