= Audenshaw Greyhound Racing and Sports Ground =

Greyhound racing facility in England

- Location: Audenshaw, near Ashton-under-Lyne, Greater Manchester
- Coordinates: 53°28′49.2″N 2°07′35.8″W
- Opened: 1921 (trotting); 1928 (speedway); 1930 (greyhound racing)
- Closed: 1934

Audenshaw Greyhound Racing and Sports Ground was a trotting track, speedway dirt track and greyhound racing track in Audenshaw, near Ashton-under-Lyne, Greater Manchester.

== Origins ==
Before the turn of the 20th century an athletic and coursing ground was constructed east of Manchester near Ashton-under-Lyne on the north side of the Manchester Road and east side of the Ashton Branch Junction Railway Line (part of the London and North Western Railway). This is not to be confused with the Athletics stadium that existed on the south side of the Manchester Road and had been built earlier.

== Speedway ==
A large trotting track known as the Audenshaw Park Racecourse replaced the athletic and coursing ground in 1921 and seven years later in 1928 a speedway dirt track circuit was built by the South Manchester Motor Club inside the trotting track. The dirt track was known as the 'Snipe' named after the local Snipe Inn and the first meeting took place on Saturday 23 March.

The track gained a bad reputation due to its unsafe nature because it was not fenced in and piles of dirt and coal defined the perimeter which ultimately resulted in three riders being killed. The track was banned from hosting speedway and the last meeting took place on 16 April 1931.

== Greyhound racing ==
Following the loss of speedway the trotting track suffered problems with the sport in decline it was decided in December 1931 to stop the trotting events and bring in greyhound racing. A greyhound track was constructed and the first meeting was held on 15 March 1932. The racing was conducted under British Greyhound Track Control Society (BGTCS) rules. The BGTCS was the rival organisation to the much larger National Greyhound Racing Club.

== Closure ==
The greyhound racing only lasted until April 1934 when the whole operation went up for auction as a result of liquidation. Advertised as the Audenshaw Greyhound Racing and Sports Ground the offer included 21½ acres of freehold land with a half mile cinder track suitable for speedway, a 460 yards greyhound oval and a track suitable for trotting or athletic meetings. Other items included in the sale were the Sumner electric hare system, one hundred company owned greyhounds, kennels, stables, stand accommodation, members club house, floodlighting and a public address system.

It is believed that the site had been subject to housing redevelopment since March 1930 and the local corporation must have become involved because the whole site was demolished and became housing soon after. The Snipe Inn still exists today.
