= Kilmarnock Greyhound Stadium =

Greyhound racing venue in Kilmarnock, Scotland

- Location: Kilmarnock, East Ayrshire, Scotland
- Coordinates: 55°36′58″N 4°30′14″W
- Opened: 1934
- Closed: 1967

Kilmarnock Greyhound Stadium was a greyhound racing stadium in Kilmarnock, East Ayrshire, Scotland.

The greyhound stadium was constructed on High Bonnyton Road (now Balmoral Road) east of the Bonnyton Colliery and directly north of Bonnyton Cottage. The first greyhound meeting took place on 18 May 1934 and the track was independent (unlicensed). Totalisator turnover in 1947 was £91,547. The racing ended in 1967 and the stadium eventually became a football ground before being demolished. The land was sold by Diageo (manufacturers of Johnnie Walker whisky) to the Klin Group in 2012.
