= Highgate Stadium =

Greyhound racing stadium in England

- Location: Nicholas Lane, Goldthorpe, South Yorkshire, England
- Coordinates: 53°32′12″N 1°18′54″W
- Opened: 1934

Highgate Stadium is a greyhound racing stadium in Nicholas Lane, Goldthorpe, South Yorkshire, England.

== Origins ==
The stadium was constructed on the west side of Nicholas Lane and was surrounded entirely by three railway lines. The Highgate colliery was nearby to the east.

== History ==
The area contained a strong mining community and attracted patronage from nearby Rotherham, Doncaster and Barnsley. In the 1970s racing was held on Tuesday evenings and Saturday afternoons over 340 and 450 yards. It was an all-grass track and was described as a good galloping track with wide easy bends and an 'Inside Sumner' hare system.

By the late 1980s the circumference was 440 metres with race distances of 260, 304, 414, 590 and 740 metres. The track was sand with racing on Monday, Thursday and Saturday evenings.

In 2008 the track was featured in a BBC documentary called 'The flapping track'. The official programme preview was listed as "The story of South Yorkshire's Highgate Greyhound Stadium, which each week attracts a motley crowd of characters to the world of flapping - independent, unregulated greyhound racing".

Until March 2019 racing took place every Tuesday, Thursday, and Sunday. Facilities include a stadium cafe, a fully licensed bar and fast food area. It is one of only five independent (unaffiliated to a governing body) tracks remaining today.

On 26 March 2019 the management of the stadium announced via their official Facebook page that greyhound racing at the stadium had been suspended for the foreseeable future due to a lack of entries from trainers aside from those who were long-term affiliated with the stadium.
