= Dillington Park Stadium =

Sports venue in the South Yorkshire, England

- Interactive map of Dillington Park Stadium
- Location: Highstone Road, Barnsley, South Yorkshire
- Coordinates: 53°32′37″N 1°28′31.8″W

Construction
- Opened: 1934
- Closed: 1990

Dillington Park Stadium was a greyhound racing stadium on Highstone Road in Barnsley, South Yorkshire.

== Origins ==
The stadium was constructed north of Highstone Road, south of Bank Street and east of Bedford Street. Dillington Park was originally a park and then a recreation ground named after the area known as Dillington in Worsbrough Common.

== Opening ==
The official opening date for greyhound racing was on 25 May 1934 but it was originally a popular venue for whippet racing four times per week and was also used for significant boxing bouts. A second track in Barnsley, the Dearne Athletic and Sports Stadium in Old Mill Lane, also hosted greyhound racing from 1934-1935 but a third venue at the Queen's Ground was refused a betting licence three times by the Corporation.

== History ==
The whippet racing gradually disappeared and was replaced entirely by the greyhound racing. The racing was independent (not affiliated to the sports governing body the National Greyhound Racing Club) and it was known as a flapping track which was the nickname given to independent tracks.

The stadium offered basic facilities with a fully licensed bar (serving Barnsley bitter), lounge area and snack bar in the main stand with panoramic views of the racing. The track was all-grass, 330 yards in circumference and used an 'Inside Sumner' hare system with race distances of 400, 500, 650 and 800 yards. All races were handicap races and there were eight on course bookmakers.

By the 1980s the owners were Terrence and Marjorie Green and racing took place on Wednesday and Friday evenings at 7.30pm. The track was now all-sand and had kennels for 48 greyhounds on site.

== Closure ==
In May 1990 a fire forced the closure of the stadium. The site today is housing known as Highstone View.
