= Wishaw Greyhound Stadium =

Greyhound racing venue in Wishaw, Scotland

- Location: Wishaw, North Lanarkshire, Scotland
- Coordinates: 55°46′08″N 3°56′05″W
- Opened: 1934
- Closed: 2001

Wishaw Greyhound Stadium was a greyhound racing stadium in Wishaw, North Lanarkshire, Scotland.

== Origins ==
The stadium ran alongside the main railway line between Netherton Street and Millbank Road but had a company address of 121 Netherton Street. Greyhound racing started on 26 January 1934 and the circumference of the track was 400 yards and was described as a galloping track with wide bends and easy to run. The main stand was adjacent to the railway line. Major competitions at the track were the Spring Cup, Pitmans Derby, Gold Cup and St Leger and distances covered were 300, 500, 700 and 900 yards.

== History ==
The track remained independent (unlicensed) for 65 years and the management declined an invite from the National Greyhound Racing Club in 1989.

== Closure ==
The track closed on 1 September 2001 and was redeveloped into housing called Beltonfoot Way and Gunn Mews. The stadium location should not be confused with the current location of the Wishaw Sports Ground and Centre which is situated just 100 yards to the north-east.
