= Albion Greyhound Racecourse =

Defunct sports stadium in Salford, England

Albion Greyhound Racecourse, Salford
- Interactive map of Albion Greyhound Racecourse, Salford
- Location: Salford, England
- Coordinates: 53°29′50.9″N 2°16′19.2″W

Construction
- Opened: 1928
- Closed: 1976

Tenant
- Greyhound racing

The Albion Greyhound Racecourse was a greyhound racing and Motorcycle speedway stadium in Salford, England.

== Origins ==
The residents of Salford had a large horse racecourse on their doorstep in the Charlestown Ward known as the Manchester Racecourse or Castle Irwell. This course had been in existence since around 1850 and the passion for racing led to a greyhound track starting life in 1927 not long after the introduction of oval track greyhound racing to the United Kingdom in 1926.

The track to be known as the Albion Greyhound Racecourse would be squeezed into a piece of land adjacent to the River Irwell and the two bridges crossing it to the north and south formed part of the Cromwell Road and Gerald Road. These roads were linked to the Seaford Road that ran alongside the east side of the track. The horse racecourse was on the north side.

== Greyhound racing ==
=== Opening ===
A company called the Albion Greyhounds Ltd was created in October 1927, with the Chairman being Mr H B Hobson. Harry Bury was appointed as the first General Manager after arriving from Burnley Greyhound Stadium.

The first meeting was organised by the Albion greyhound Ltd on 7 April 1928 with speedway arriving in 1928. The greyhound track was described as a good galloping track, 456 yards in circumference with a long run-up to the first bend.

=== History ===
A greyhound called Italian Printer won the Northern Flat title in 1938 at nearby Belle Vue Stadium trained by Thomas Callighan.

The track was relatively popular and business peaked in 1946 like many other tracks and actually topped a £2 million totalisator turnover.

The large circumference had sweeping bends that were very lightly banked but unusually it had been converted to grass from sand after the war. This is very unusual because all tracks were grass before converting to sand decades later. This is the first known case of a track doing the reverse. The hare system was an 'Outside Metro-Vickers Mono-rail' and the distances consisted of 300, 450, 518 and 700 yards.

Similar to other stadiums there was a stand on either side of the track with a tote buildings situated on both sides of each stand. The paddock and racing kennels were located on the fourth bend and the 140 resident kennels stretched the entire back straight not too far from the river bank. The Racing Manager for many years from the early 1950s until the end of the 1960s was Mr J R Mallinson.

A casino was added to the plot of land on the north side of the track, it would eventually be relocated north of Cromwell Road on land that was previously the Castle Irwell racecourse which closed in 1963.

== Closure ==
With increased availability of other pastimes the stadium was bought by the Salford Corporation for £130,000 in order to be developed for housing.

The Tuesday and Friday evening racing ended on Friday 30 July 1976. The land today belongs to a housing estate, a small reminder is one of the roads with the name Greyhound Drive.

== Track records ==
Distance yards	Greyhound	Time	Date	Notes
300	Be Four	17.42	1947	sand
300	Baytown Code	17.31	05.04.1957	
450	Ballymore Sound	26.93	1947	sand
450	Trust No Man	26.68	20.06.1952	
518	Beautiful Tangle	30.26	1947	sand
518	Clonmannon Flash	28.86	02.07.1965	
700	English Warrior	42.38	1947	sand
700	Claudyne	39.98	03.08.1965	
518 H	Rush Street	30.94	22.07.1955	
