= Recreation Ground, Tredegar =

Cricket ground in Tredegar

- Location: Tredegar, Blaenau Gwent, southeast Wales
- Coordinates: 51°45′58.3″N 3°14′42.4″W
- Opened: 1931
- Closed: 1939

The Recreation Ground, Tredegar is a cricket ground and former greyhound racing and speedway stadium in Tredegar, Blaenau Gwent, south-east Wales.

The stadium was situated on the west side of the London and North Western Railway line and north of the Whitworth coal pits. The Recreation Ground located south of Stable Lane was a very large park area opened in 1899 as an industrial welfare ground. It was built over two old pit shafts and gifted to the public by Lord Tredegar in 1890s. The area remained as a park until a speedway track was opened by Aneurin Bevan in 1929. The speedway only lasted until 1930; it is believed it only lasted one year because of the damage being caused to the rugby pitches.

The greyhound track opened on 10 July 1931. The racing was independent (unaffiliated to a governing body) and racing ceased before World War II. The land was transferred to Tredegar Urban District Council and remains a recreation and cricket ground today.
