= Farringdon Park =

British sporting venue

- Interactive map of Farringdon Park
- Location: New Lane, Preston
- Coordinates: 53°46′00″N 2°39′22″W

Construction
- Opened: 1877
- Closed: 1932

Farringdon Park was a multi-use park, gardens and sports stadium on New Lane, east of Preston, Lancashire, England.

== History ==
=== Preston Pleasure Gardens ===
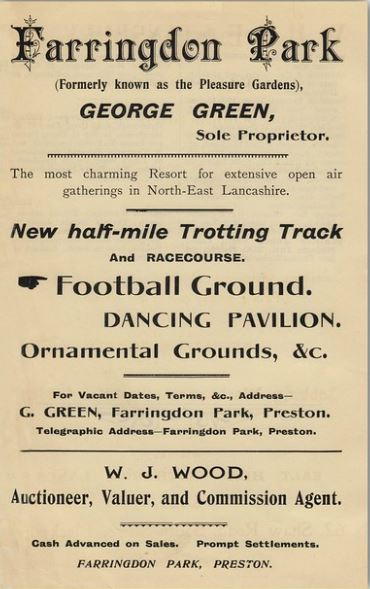
Advert c. 1900

In 1875 the Preston Nursery and Pleasure Gardens Company (headed by James Huddart, from the Hesketh family) acquired the 90-acre (36 ha) Farringdon Hall Estate and began to construct a 44-acre (18 ha) public facility including gardens and eight miles (13 km) of paths. Two years later on 5 May 1877, the Preston Pleasure Gardens, featuring ornamental lakes, a small wooded valley and a waterfall, opened to the public. A large dancing platform and bandstand were added and the site hosted the 1878 Royal Horticultural Society Show.

=== Farringdon Park ===
The Pleasure Gardens were purchased and renamed by George Green in 1901, taking on the name Farringdon Park, due to its origins being on the Farringdon Park Estate. The football pitch was home to a team called Preston (not Preston North End) and the cycling track was used by Preston West End Cycling Club. A pavilion was built in 1902 and the site was let out for fetes and galas over the following years.

On 13 August 1903 a one-half-mile (0.80 km) trotting and galloping (horse) track was built and garden allotments and greenhouses were also let and George Green even acquired the tram terminus. Green died in November 1915, leaving the Park in the management of his brother John, who then sold to Messrs, Horrockses, Crewdson Ltd.

From 18 September 1924, the stadium was leased by Preston Grasshoppers R.F.C. and in 1929 the club agreed a six-year sub-tenancy with Preston speedway team, and a dirt track was constructed around the perimeter of the rugby pitch.

The speedway, run by a company called Preston Speedways Ltd, was very popular with regular crowds of 14,000 fans. George Formby won a race at the stadium on a two stroke machine. The track marshall was Norman Jackson and the team raced for three years. The track was one of the most dangerous circuits in the country with three fatalities within 14 months. John Proctor Stockdale died on 18 May 1929, John Seith was killed on 18 August 1929 and on 24 July 1930, James Carnie became the third racing death.

Preston Speedways Ltd was wound up in December 1930 but Ossie Wade took over a three-year sub-lease and installed Norman Jackman as manager for the 1931 season. However, the speedway ended for good after the 1931 season.

In July 1932 Preston Grasshoppers surrendered their lease for £2,000 (equivalent to about £121,000 in 2025) and vacated the ground shortly afterwards. The new lease owner was a greyhound racing syndicate based in Liverpool that called themseleves the White City Sports Stadium (Preston) Ltd but their timing was dreadful because less than a mile to the west the Preston Greyhound Stadium had recently opened in May of the same year. Seven months later in December and despite assurances that £50,000 (equivalent to about £3,018,000 in 2025) would be spent on the sports stadium, the Preston Town Council rejected the planning application for a greyhound track and adjacent sports facilities. The owner of Farringdon Park during this turbulent time was W. J. Jones and in 1935 he sold the 42-acre (17 ha) site for £15,250 (equivalent to about £937,720 in 2025) to the Preston Corporation (the same council that refused planning permission just two years previous).

=== Housing ===
Farringdon Park had begun the process of constructing housing as early as 1934 and by 1938, 300 new council homes were built on the Farringdon Park and adjoining Thirlmere estates.
