= Halifax Greyhound Stadium =

Sports venue in the UK

- Location: Halifax, West Yorkshire
- Coordinates: 53°43′30″N 1°53′19″W
- Opened: 1931
- Closed: 1979

Halifax Greyhound Stadium was a greyhound racing stadium and cricket ground on the same grounds as Thrum Hall in Halifax, West Yorkshire.

== Origins and opening ==
The Thrum Hall cricket ground had a speedway dirt track constructed around the cricket pitch and hosted the Halifax Speedway team until 1930. A greyhound track replaced the speedway the following year with the greyhound track taking a most unusual shape in the form of a D shape to allow the cricket ground to remain in place inside the circuit.

The first race meeting on Spring Hall Lane was held on 7 November 1931 and the first runner past the winning line was a 4-1 shot called Unconscious. The first distances included 300, 480 and 500 yards (mainly handicaps) and the Manager Director was H.Wood.

== History ==
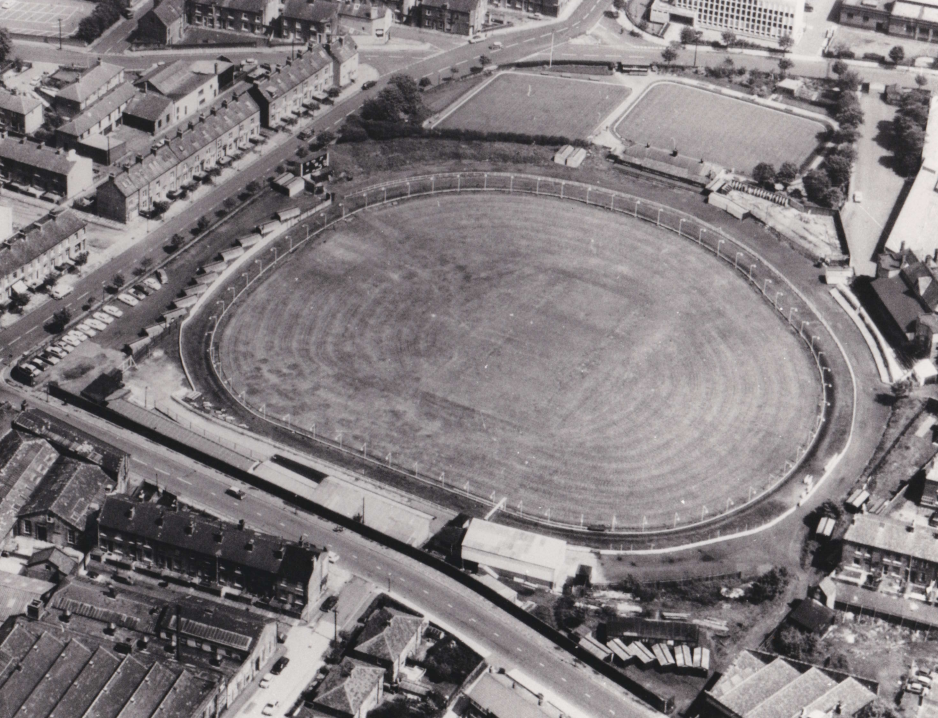
Halifax Stadium c.1950

It was not until after the war that the stadium was known as the Halifax Greyhound Stadium and improvements resulted in the venue being able to accommodate between 3,000 and 5,000 spectators during Monday and Thursday racing.

The track remained independent (unaffiliated to a governing body) for 44 years before the move was made to become affiliated with the National Greyhound Racing Club (NGRC) in 1975. Facilities by now also included a licensed bar and snack bar, racing was held on Monday and Friday evenings at 7.30pm and trial sessions took place on Sunday mornings. The track was all-grass and race distances of 352 and 490 yards (mainly handicaps) were the featured events.

The change to NGRC racing was under the new permit scheme which enabled smaller tracks to race under rules at reduced costs. No less than six new tracks joined the NGRC permit scheme in 1975 and Halifax owners Jack Wardman and Jon Carter (an Owlerton Stadium director) ensured Halifax became one of them. Wardman introduced a festival of racing in 1975 which attracted some of the North's best dogs.

Just one year later Jon Carter bought a 50% stake in the track with the other 50% being bought by a syndicate of ten that included Barbara Fearn wife of NGRC steward Alan Fearn. In 1978 another change of ownership took place, David Collins a local businessman was the latest buyer and installed photo finish and ray timing for the first time as well as building a new clubhouse for the patrons.

== Closure ==
Despite all of the work from Collins the greyhound racing ceased to run under NGRC rules in 1979. Halifax RLFC sold the site for £1.5 million to Asda in 1998 which now stands in place of the entire sports grounds today.
