= Preston (speedway) =

English motorcycle speedway team, 1929–1932

Club information
- Track address: Farringdon Park; New Hall Lane; Preston; Lancashire.
- Country: England
- Founded: 1929
- Closed: 1932
- League: English Dirt Track League; Northern League

Major team honours
| English Dirt Track Knockout Cup | 1929 |

Preston were a British speedway team that existed from 1929 to 1932 and raced at Farringdon Park.

== History ==
From 18 September 1924, Farringdon Park was leased by Preston Grasshoppers R.F.C. and in 1929 the club agreed a six-year sub-tenancy with Preston Speedways Ltd, and a dirt track was constructed around the perimeter of the rugby pitch.

The speedway, run by Preston Speedways Ltd, was very popular with regular crowds of 14,000 fans. George Formby won a race at the stadium on a two stroke machine. The track marshall was Norman Jackson and the team raced for three years. The track was one of the most dangerous circuits in the country with three fatalities within 14 months. John Proctor Stockdale died on 18 May 1929, John Seith was killed on 18 August 1929 and on 24 July 1930, James Carnie became the third racing death.

They team first competed in the English Dirt Track League (effectively the Northern League) in 1929 when they were runners-up to Leeds Lions. In the same season they won the English Dirt Track Knockout Cup beating Halifax in the final.

The team raced for the 1930 Speedway Northern League but Preston Speedways Ltd was wound up in December 1930. However, Oswald 'Ossie' Wade took over a three year sub-lease and installed Norman Jackman as manager for the 1931 season. The speedway ended for good at the end of the 1931 season.

The location today is Farringdon Crescent.

== Notable riders ==
- Joe Abbott
- Ham Burrill
- Tommy Price
- Claude Rye

== Season summary ==
| Year and league | Position | Notes |
|---|---|---|
| 1929 Speedway English Dirt Track League | 2nd | |
| 1930 Speedway Northern League | 4th | |
| 1931 Speedway Northern League | 5th | |
