= Burnley Greyhound Stadium =

Former British sports venue

- Interactive map of Burnley Greyhound Stadium
- Location: Burnley, Lancashire, England
- Coordinates: 53°46′53″N 2°13′33″W

Construction
- Opened: 1927
- Closed: 1935

Burnley Greyhound Stadium also known as Towneley Stadium was a former greyhound racing and speedway stadium in Burnley, Lancashire, England.

== Origins ==
South of Burnley there was a large open space known as Towneley Park which served Towneley Hall and the Towneley family for five centuries. In 1902 the estate was sold to the Burnley Corporation and, although most of the park remained in situ, they agreed the sale of a plot of land that ran alongside the River Calder and the Hall's north access road. This ten-acre plot was in the area known as Towneley Holmes.

The stadium could be accessed from either the east or west side; on the west side the path was opposite the Smalley Street junction with Woodgrove Road and cut across Towneley Park meeting the Hall's north access road. The stadium kennels were adjacent to this path situated on the north side of the stadium. From the east there was footbridge over the River Calder that met the Hall's north access road. Whichever entry was chosen resulted in the same turnstile entrances on the east side of the stadium being used where the main stand overlooked the course.

A local company with a share capital of £13,000 purchased and constructed the greyhound track, which was a very large 570 yards in circumference. The first race night was held on 3 September 1927 with seven thousand attending the meeting opened by Lady O'Hagan. Harry Bury was the first general manager, but left for the newly opened Albion Greyhound Racecourse in February 1928.

== History ==
100 greyhounds brought mainly from Hull were initially housed at the Burnley track. The stadium came under the control of a company called the Associated Greyhound Racecourses, with Towneley becoming their second of three tracks that they eventually owned, the first being Darnall Stadium, and the third the Old Craven Park in Hull.

Haulage businessman Bill Sharples had a litter out of track bitch Calliope, sired by Grand National finalist Douro, and trainers included former England goalkeeper Jack Hillman and Jack Ashworth. In 1931, four years after opening, the Associated Greyhound Racecourses went bankrupt, and the track was taken over by a local businessman named W Spencer, who closed the stadium, blaming the government betting bill that restricted the days that tracks could race. With meetings limited to a maximum of 101 per annum the management put the stadium, kennels and equipment up for auction.

== Speedway ==
A Burnley speedway team was formed and joined the inaugural 1929 Speedway English Dirt Track League, but withdrew mid-season and had their results expunged.

== Closure ==
In 1935 the stadium was taken over by Captain Ramsbottom, who had replaced Harry Bury as the judge and handicapper under a previous promotion. Ramsbottom then made a quick profit by selling onto two brothers, Dr. and Clem Hodgson, with the last greyhound meeting taking place on 2 November 1935. The stadium's stands, shelters and kennels were demolished, and the track was filled in; the site became playing fields.

A golf course then opened to the north and incorporated the site. The stadium was on what today are the northerly holes of a golf course, exactly opposite the £33 million Unity College on the River Calder.
