= 1934 English Greyhound Derby =

- Location: White City Stadium
- Start date: 9 June
- End date: 23 June
- Total prize money: £1,050 (winner)

The 1934 Greyhound Derby took place during June with the final being held on 23 June 1934 at White City Stadium. The winner Davesland received a first prize of £1,050.

== Final result ==
At White City (over 525 yards):

Position	Name of Greyhound	Breeding	Trap	SP	Time	Trainer
1st	Davesland	Kick Him Down - Hasty Go	4	3-1	29.81	Jack Harvey (Harringay)
2nd	Grey Raca	Barnamaghery - Maesydd Mischief	3	6-4f	29.97	Johnny Bullock (Harringay)
3rd	Wild Woolley	Hautley - Wild Witch	6	5-1	30.05	Harry Woolner (Clapton)
4th	Brilliant Bob	Other Days - Birchfield Bessie	1	3-1	30.37	Sidney Orton (Wimbledon)
5th	Kumm On Steve	Halmirah - Barbara Joan	5	100-7	30.44	Albert Jonas (White City - London)
6th	Denham Peter	Deemster - Beauvallon	2	3-1	32.76	Mrs E.G Westley (Private)

=== Distances ===
2, 1, 4, 1, 4 (lengths)
The distances between the greyhounds are in finishing order and shown in lengths. From 1927-1950 one length was equal to 0.06 of one second but race times are shown as 0.08 as per modern day calculations.

== Review ==
The defending champion Wild Woolley returned in an attempt to win a second Derby and Brilliant Bob had come over from Ireland with a reputation after being purchased by A.J Dearman from Billy Quinn for £2,000. Brilliant Bob had won the 1933 Irish St Leger and 1934 Easter Cup and his new trainer Sidney Orton immediately entered him for the Laurels which he won. A change to the Derby format saw three qualify from each heat with just five runners in each. Brilliant Bob got the Derby underway by winning the very first heat. Heat seven was the strongest and wide running Gold Collar champion Davesland had drawn trap one but he still gained a victory, inflicting a defeat on Trafalgar Cup winner Grey Raca, who had been aiming for a twelfth successive win. Other significant heat winners included Beef Cutlet, Wild Woolley and 1933 finalist Lutwyche.

The first semi-final was an open race in which Grey Raca (9/2) eased to a ten length win in 29.69, the fastest time of the competition to date; there had been trouble behind Grey Raca when Brilliant Bob and 11-4 favourite Roving Cutlet collided twice. Brilliant Bob gained second place and the privately trained Denham Peter ran on for the third qualifying place. In a competitive second semi-final the lead changed several times before Davesland (11/10f) claimed victory from Wild Woolley and Kumm On Steve in a time of 29.94. Beef Cutlet failed to progress as did Lutwyche who finished lame.

The Derby final was now the most important night of the greyhound racing calendar, the evening dress restaurant was fully booked months in advance. Grey Raca went into the final as 6-4 favourite and a third appearance for Wild Woolley cemented his legacy. Davesland owned by Frederick Brookes and trained by Jack Harvey was fast away and maintained a lead all the way in a fast time of 29.81. Kumm on Steve and Wild Woolley were bumped at the first and lost their chances. The favourite Grey Raca, was always second and could not challenge, Wild Woolley performed admirably and finished a creditable despite that he drew trap six again, a big handicap taking into account that he was a railer.

== See also ==
- 1934 UK & Ireland Greyhound Racing Year
