= Syston Sports Stadium =

Greyhound racing venue in Syston, England

- Location: Central Avenue and East Avenue, off Melton Road; Syston, Leicestershire
- Coordinates: 52°41′53″N 1°03′47″W
- Opened: 1929 speedway 1931 greyhound racing
- Closed: 1960s

Syston Sports Stadium also known as Syston Greyhound Stadium was a greyhound racing and Motorcycle speedway track located at Central Avenue and East Avenue, off the Melton Road in Syston, Leicestershire.

== Origins ==
The stadium was built in 1929 in just five weeks for the Leicester Super Speedway, on farm land surrounding Lodge Farm. It was located on the east side of East Avenue and the north side of Central Avenue (found at the far eastern end of Mostyn Avenue) which in turn was located off the main road called Melton Road. It should not be confused with the Syston Sports Ground which was located just yards to the north and also ran alongside East Avenue.

== Speedway ==
The stadium was originally built for speedway which was held in 1930 & 1931.

== Greyhound Racing ==
The stadium opened to greyhound racing during 1931 and the racing was independent (not affiliated to the sports governing body the National Greyhound Racing Club). Racing was held on Thursday and Saturday evenings with trial days on Tuesday afternoons.

== Other uses ==
The venue was used for trotting by the Morton Grange Sporting Club during 1958.

== Closure ==
The stadium closed during the 1960s, replaced by housing on Mowbray Drive. The Sports ground located on the north side of the stadium also closed and became the housing on Belvoir Road.
