= Murder of Tom ap Rhys Pryce =

2006 murder of a British lawyer

Tom ap Rhys Pryce
- Born: Thomas Mervyn ap Rhys Pryce; 13 October 1974; Broxbourne, Hertfordshire, UK
- Died: 12 January 2006 (aged 31); Kensal Green, London, UK
- Cause of death: Murder by stabbing
- Occupation: Lawyer
- Known for: Murder victim
- Partner: Adele Eastman (engaged)

Thomas Mervyn ap Rhys Pryce (13 October 1974 – 12 January 2006) was a 31-year-old British lawyer who was robbed and murdered by two teenagers as he made his way home in Kensal Green, northwest London, on 12 January 2006. The two, Donnel Carty and Delano Brown, were sentenced to life imprisonment.

The crime was widely reported for the way in which Pryce was murdered, only metres from his own home, and had only his Oyster card and mobile phone taken from him, but no money (the case being widely reported as an example of steaming). The murderers were later tracked down when the police examined CCTV footage of where the Oyster card was used after the murder. The crime caused a political uproar and condemnation of railway station security. The Tom ap Rhys Pryce Memorial Trust was set up after the murder, and a school was built in his honour.

== Life of Tom ap Rhys Pryce ==
Tom ap Rhys Pryce was a 31-year-old lawyer who worked for Linklaters, an international law firm headquartered in London. Pryce was born in Broxbourne, Hertfordshire, England. At the age of three, the Pryce family moved to Somalia after Pryce's father, John, a civil engineer, was sent to work there as part of a project to build a sugar factory, there he "enjoyed an idyllic early childhood". After 18 months they returned home to Hertfordshire before moving in 1980 to the family home in Weybridge where Pryce grew up. His ancestry was one well known within the military and among his ancestors was his great-grandfather, General Sir Henry Edward ap Rhys Pryce (1874–1950). At 13, Pryce won an academic and music exhibition which was later upgraded to a full scholarship at 16 to attend Marlborough College, Wiltshire, England.

There he achieved passes at A-levels in Greek, Latin and English Literature, with three grade As. From there Pryce went on to gain a First-Class honours at Trinity College, Cambridge in June 1996, where he read Classics staying on to study for a master's. Pryce was also known to be a talented musician and lived on Bathurst Gardens, Kensal Green in a flat which he shared with his fiancée Adele Eastman, 31, a solicitor specialising in employment law with Farrer & Co, the Queen's solicitors.

== Events of 12 January 2006 ==
Childhood friends Donnel Carty, 18, and Delano Brown, 17, had earlier that evening robbed chef Kurshid Ali, a middle-aged man, in Kensal Green station, 20 minutes before Pryce arrived at the station on his way home from work. Pryce was walking from Kensal Green Tube station at about 23:00 to 23:30, when he was attacked. According to witness reports, Pryce was running along Bathurst Gardens from two black youths. According to testimony from Delano Brown, Donnel Carty stabbed Pryce after they had chased him from Kensal Green Tube station where police found a trail of blood and belongings, including a pair of gloves and papers regarding Pryce's wedding arrangements. As the youths chased Pryce, Carty "fly-kicked" him in the back and he dropped to the floor. As Pryce attempted to stand up, Carty kicked him in the face. Trying to get away, Pryce began to fight Carty, as Carty stopped him. Some time during this Pryce was stabbed twice in the chest and once in the hip, the wounds penetrating vital organs including his heart. He also suffered cuts to his head, hands and torso. As Pryce's belongings lay scattered around him, Carty and Brown took Pryce's mobile phone and Oyster card, the only possessions of value Pryce was carrying. Carty then shouted 'What else have you got?' to which Pryce responded 'Nothing. You have got everything'. Carty and Brown then ran off towards Clifford Gardens, heading to Carty's home leaving Pryce dying on the ground. Pryce was later taken to Central Middlesex Hospital, where he was confirmed dead shortly after midnight.

The scene of the crime which took place along Bathurst Gardens showed the course of events of the violent confrontation. Pryce's book and gloves were lying outside No 56, a silver Audi car was smeared with blood outside No 82 and a list of wedding venues outside 84. Pryce was found collapsed in the gutter between parked cars outside No 90.

== Donnel Carty and Delano Brown ==
Donnel Carty and Delano Brown

Carty and Brown were, according to Brown, childhood friends who thought of each other as cousins. Carty lived with his grandparents in Burrows Road, Kensal Green, and Brown lived with his mother in Rosebank Avenue, Sudbury, northwest London. Carty had one conviction for assaulting a police officer when he was 16 years old, and a caution for possessing cannabis. Brown had no previous convictions. The pair were members of a violent gang calling itself the KG Tribe, taking part in the unlawful wounding of two commuters in December 2005 as well as other robberies. At the time of the murder of Pryce, Carty and Brown were 18 and 17 respectively.

When both men were arrested on 18 January, Carty said he was innocent of the allegations and claimed he had been in a pub in Kilburn with relatives and friends, and stayed the night at a relative's house. When police searched his home, they found a pair of trainers that forensic tests showed had a drop of ap Rhys Pryce's blood on one toe. DNA from several people, including Brown, were found on the trainers. Officers also found a top with traces of Brown's DNA, and fibres found on Pryce's overcoat were microscopically indistinguishable from the material of that top. Brown also said he had been in Kilburn the night of the murder and initially claimed that he had nothing to do with either the robbery of the other man or the robbery and murder of Pryce. When the mobile phone of the other victim (Ali) was discovered at his home, he claimed he had bought it from two men. Detectives also found that Brown had hoarded press cuttings of Pryce.

== Trial of Carty and Brown ==
Police caught Carty through CCTV footage which showed him using Pryce's Oyster card (which he claimed to have found) at Kensal Green station, forensic evidence found at the homes of Carty and Brown, and Pryce's mobile phone. Carty and Brown both denied murder but admitted that they had robbed Pryce and another man just before. Brown was 17 at the time of the offence so initially could not be named for legal reasons.

The trial of the two defendants opened on 30 October 2006 at the Central Criminal Court before Mr Justice Aikens and a jury. Throughout the trial Brown declared that it was Carty who had stabbed Pryce and that it had simply been a 'robbery gone bad'. This led to an alleged attack on Brown by three youths at Feltham Young Offender Institution during the trial, in which his attackers reportedly said: "You are snitching on your co-d (co-defendant)." Carty denied any involvement in the incident, claiming it had been the result of an argument Brown had with the youths earlier. On 27 November 2006, Carty and Brown were convicted of murder. Carty and Brown reacted calmly to the guilty verdicts, turning to each other, shaking hands and embracing.

On 28 November 2006, both men were sentenced to life imprisonment. The minimum termed for Carty was fixed at 21 years, and that for 18-year-old Brown at 17 years. The trial judge said he could not tell who wielded the knife but considered both defendants equally guilty. Both sentences were referred to the Court of Appeal (Criminal Division) as "unduly lenient" by Her Majesty's Attorney General, Lord Goldsmith QC. That court, constituted by the Lord Chief Justice of England and Wales, Lord Phillips of Worth Matravers, Mr Justice Henriques and Mr Justice Teare, increased Brown's minimum term to 20 years, although it did not interfere with the sentence imposed upon Carty.

== Reaction ==
The then Prime Minister Tony Blair's immediate response to the murder was to pledge the investigation of public safety at the tube station close to where Pryce was murdered, Kensal Green.

No amount of poverty or deprivation can excuse crime: the blame belongs to the criminal. If Carty and Brown had been arrested at the beginning of their crime spree and sentenced to a stiff punishment, Mr ap Rhys Pryce might be alive today.

— David Cameron

David Cameron criticised the Labour Government's criminal justice system and the absence of father-figures in ethnic minority cultures, which he claimed as causes in the murder of Pryce. Cameron stated that lack of strong deterrent sentences for knife crimes and the failure of police to stop prolific criminals had played a role in the killing of Pryce. He insisted that parental background had a key role in preventing crime and called for zero tolerance of knife crime, claiming that not enough criminals were being sent to jail.

In January 2006 the Metropolitan Police Commissioner Sir Ian Blair created considerable controversy when he described the media as institutionally racist. This accusation had also been levelled at the police for the allegedly unbalanced coverage of black-on-white crimes, such as this murder, as compared to that given to crimes against ethnic minorities. The example Blair cited was that of Balbir Matharu, an Asian man murdered on the same day as Pryce. Matharu was run over and dragged almost 44 yards (40 m) by a car driven by thieves he had disturbed as they broke into a van parked outside his workplace. Newspapers argued that the number of stories printed regarding the two victims were similar, though a survey of national newspapers after the two murders showed that longer and more in-depth articles were written about the murder of Pryce than that of Matharu.

== Legacy ==
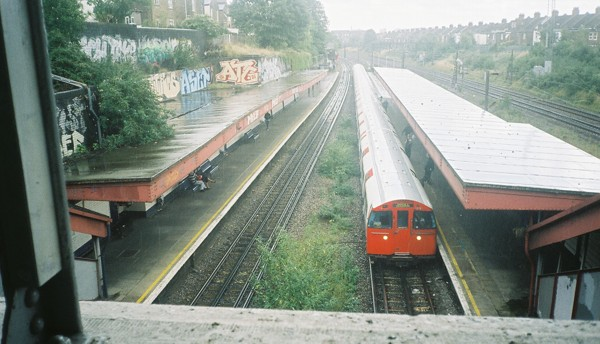
Kensal Green Station, left with no security during evenings

Following the murder of Pryce, his friends and family set up The Tom ap Rhys Pryce Memorial Trust to enable individuals who could not otherwise afford it to achieve their potential by gaining access to appropriate educational facilities. It aims to raise at least £1 million to help educate society's poorest children.

This incident sparked a major public discussion on station safety and security, mainly because the station was unstaffed when the suspects mugged Ali on the platform. The only security present was CCTV cameras, and the ticket barriers were left open allowing the suspects to enter the station freely. Many high-profile politicians spoke on the issue of station safety and called on rail companies to provide security or staff the station until the last train had left the station. The Mayor of London, Ken Livingstone assailed Silverlink, the train company who managed the station, for not providing all-night staffing or security. The new provider of every franchise across the rail network will have to provide staff at all times the station is open.

A school was built in Vietnam in memory of Pryce. His colleagues raised enough money to have the school built to leave a lasting legacy in his honour. The primary school opened in 2007. Its cost was met by the Hong Kong office of Pryce's employer, Linklaters.
