= Tommy Price (speedway rider, born 1907) =

British Speedway rider (1907–1989)

- 1937 cigarette card
- Born: 28 October 1907; Burscough Bridge, Lancashire, England
- Died: April 1989 (aged 81); York, England
- Nationality: British (English)

Career history
- 1929-1930, 1936-1937: Liverpool Chads
- 1929-1930: Preston
- 1931: Leicester Super
- 1934: Birmingham Bulldogs
- 1936-1938: Belle Vue Aces/Merseysiders

Thomas Arthur Price (28 October 1907 - April 1989) was a motorcycle speedway rider who rode for several teams between 1929 and 1937.

== Career ==
Price first rode for Liverpool Chads in 1929, and rode for both Liverpool and Preston in the 1929 and 1930 seasons. He rode for the Leicester Super team in the Northern League in 1931, scoring maximum points on his debut, but his season was cut short by a fractured elbow.

Price then took a break from the sport, returning for one season in 1934 with Birmingham Bulldogs, and then in 1936, he rode for both Liverpool Chads (in the Provincial League) and Belle Vue Merseysiders (in the National League). He was the captain of the Liverpool team in 1937.

Price rode in a Provincial League representative team in two matches against Australia in 1937.

Price's brothers Ernie Price and Norman Price were also professional speedway riders.

== Players cigarette cards ==
Price is listed as number 37 of 50 in the 1930s Player's cigarette card collection.
