= 2008 Irish Greyhound Derby =

Annual sporting event in Ireland

2008 Paddy Power Irish Greyhound Derby
- Venue: Shelbourne Park
- Location: Dublin
- Start date: 9 July
- End date: 13 September
- Total prize money: €175,000 (winner)

The 2008 Irish Greyhound Derby took place during August and September with the final being held at Shelbourne Park in Dublin on 13 September 2008.

The winner Shelbourne Aston won €175,000 and was trained by Pat Curtin (Ireland), owned by the Curtin-Hehir-Montgomery Syndicate and bred by James Marks. The race was sponsored by the Paddy Power.

== Final result ==
At Shelbourne, 13 September (over 550 yards):

Position	Winner	Breeding	Trap	Sectional	SP	Time	Trainer
1st	Shelbourne Aston	Just The Best - Queen Survivor	3	3.51	100-30jf	29.83	Pat Curtin (Ireland)
2nd	Slip The Lark	Larkhill Jo - Slip The Posse	5	3.41	7-2	29.84	Pat Buckley
3rd	Ballymac Ruso	Ballymac Maeve - Ballymac Lark	2	3.52	100-30jf	29.94	Matt Dartnall
4th	Advantage Johnny	Larkhill Jo - Lughill Angel	6	3.44	7-1	29.96	Owen McKenna
5th	Headleys Bridge	Spiral Nikita - Liscahane Ranger	1	3.55	7-2	29.98	Edward O'Sullivan
6th	Machu Picchu	Top Savings - Noan Flash	4	3.50	25-1	30.30	Peter Cronin

=== Distances ===
short-head, 1¼, head, head, 4 (lengths)

== Competition Report ==
Defending champion Tyrur Rhino and 2007 runner-up Tyrur Laurel were two of the leading entries for the 2008 Irish Derby. 2008 English Greyhound Derby champion Loyal Honcho only just made the start of the competition after picking up an injury and the other main contenders were listed as Killahan Phanter, College Causeway and Mid West Blue. Tyrur Laurel and Loyal Honcho both sealed early wins but Tyrur Rhino was a shock elimination in round two. Loyal Honcho finished lame signalling the end of two Derby champions’ campaigns.

College Causeway won all three of his rounds but Tyrur Laurel struggled through and Shelbourne Aston came through the back door after finishing fourth and claiming a lucky losers spot. The quarter finals began College Causeway completed a fourth successive win in the quarter-finals and Express Ego won at 10–1. The remaining two heats went to Headleys Bridge and Slip the Lark, Tyrur Laurel made it no further.

In the semi-finals Ballymac Ruso won in 29.91 from Machu Picchu and Slip the Lark in the first heat but College Causeway was lacklustre and came in fourth behind Advantage Johnny, Headleys Bridge and Shelbourne Aston in the second heat, Express Ego finished last.

The final was the most open final in Irish Derby history based on the starting prices. Slip the Lark and Advantage Johnny broke best from the traps and remained in the lead around the first two bends closely followed by Ballymac Ruso and a little further back was Headley Bridge. The four all went into the run-in with chances to win the first prize but Shelbourne Aston produced a strong finish and overtook all four to win by a short head.

== Quarter finals ==
Heat 1 (Aug 30)
Pos	Name	SP	Time
1st	Headleys Bridge	100-30	29.91
2nd	Ballymac Ruso	7-2	29.92
3rd	Mid West Blue	5-1	29.99
4th	Cabra Boss	12-1	30.76
5th	Compass Smash	12-1	30.77
6th	Forest Master	2-1f	30.78

Heat 2 (Aug 30)
Pos	Name	SP	Time
1st	Slip The Lark	5-4f	29.87
2nd	Cashen Zig	10-1	30.18
3rd	Machu Picchu	9-1	30.29
4th	Tyrur Laurel	7-4	30.36
5th	Swinford Mylo	14-1	30.50
6th	Top Louis	11-2	30.67

Heat 3 (Aug 30)
Pos	Name	SP	Time
1st	College Causeway	6-4f	29.81
2nd	Wise Thought	6-1	30.09
3rd	Shelbourne Aston	7-2	30.23
4th	Rocket Ricky	20-1	30.30
5th	Royal Treason	4-1	30.58
6th	Graigues Shadow	7-1	30.63

Heat 4 (Aug 30)
Pos	Name	SP	Time
1st	Express Ego	10-1	30.16
2nd	The Other Sonic	25-1	30.30
3rd	Advantage Johnny	4-1	30.44
4th	Tyrur Luke	7-2	31.03
5th	Boherash Gaoithe	20-1	32.05
6th	Killahan Phanter	4-5f	00.00

== Semi finals ==
First Semi-final (Sep 6)
Pos	Name of Greyhound	SP	Time
1st	Ballymac Ruso	7-4	29.91
2nd	Machu Piccu	14-1	30.05
3rd	Slip The Lark	6-4f	30.10
4th	Mid West Blue	9-2	30.14
5th	Wise Thought	8-1	30.21
6th	Cashen Zig	20-1	30.35

Second Semi-final (Sep 6)
Pos	Name of Greyhound	SP	Time
1st	Advantage Johnny	10-1	29.79
2nd	Headleys Bridge	2-1	29.82
3rd	Shelbourne Aston	6-1	29.89
4th	College Causeway	1-1f	30.17
5th	The Other Sonic	33-1	30.18
6th	Express Ego	12-1	30.32

== See also ==
- 2008 UK & Ireland Greyhound Racing Year
