= 2017 Irish Greyhound Derby =

2017 Boylesports Irish Greyhound Derby
- Location: Shelbourne Park
- Start date: 17 August
- End date: 23 September
- Total prize money: €240,000

The 2017 Boylesports Irish Greyhound Derby took place during August and September with the final being held on 23 September at Shelbourne Park.

The prize money on offer was €240,000 of which €150,000 went to the winner Good News, trained by Patrick Guilfoyle, owned by Sandra Guilfoyle and Mary Kennedy and bred by John Kennedy. The competition was sponsored by Boylesports.

== Final result ==
At Shelbourne Park (over 550 yards):

Position	Greyhound	Breeding	Trap	Sectional	SP	Time	Trainer
1st	Good News	Definate Opinion - Pippy	2	3.32	7-4jf	29.37	Patrick Guilfoyle
2nd	Black Farren	Droopys Cain - Ballycowen Moll	3	3.38	6-1	29.51	Graham Holland
3rd	Sonic	Knockglass Billy - Vickis Dream	6	3.36	7-4jf	29.65	Graham Holland
4th	Jaytee Jet	Droopys Scolari - Chin Gach Gook	4	3.38	12-1	29.86	Paul Hennessy
5th	Buckos Dream	Superior Product - Dalcash Dvinsky	5	3.38	5-1	30.03	Michael J O'Donovan
6th	Hey Bound	Head Bound - Southest Suzie	1	3.55	20-1	30.31	Peter Cronin

=== Distances ===
2, 2, 3, 2½, 4 (lengths)

== Competition report ==
2017 English Greyhound Derby finalist Clares Rocket was once again the ante-post favourite as he was during the 2016 Irish Greyhound Derby. The British challenge was headed by the Select Stakes champion Dorotas Wildcat. The first round took place on 17/18/19 August with the fastest winner being the Graham Holland pair of Sonic (a finalist in 2016) in 29.12 and Clares Rocket in 29.16.

In the first eight heats of the second round Good News set the best time of 29.49 and Sonic recorded a second success, as did Typical Ash. The second eight heats saw Produce and Laurels champion Clonbrien Hero record 29.41 before Clares Rocket won in 29.15. Kilgraney Ace also went well, winning in 29.36.

The 2016 English Greyhound Derby champion Jaytee Jet won his third round heat but it was Clares Rocket who was once again the fastest with a 29.58 win to remain unbeaten. Tyrur Harold, Sonic and Droopys Cabaye also remained unbeaten going into the quarter-finals. Dorotas Wildcat was an unfortunate withdrawal after picking up a shoulder injury.

In the quarter-finals Sonic won a first messy heat in a time of 29.61 which was followed by an impressive win for Native Chimes from Kilgraney Ace in 29.44. The third quarter went to Black Farren who ended Tyrur Harold's unbeaten run and Jaytee Jet qualified by virtue of a third-place finish but Droopys Cabaye was eliminated. The final heat was won by Good News who surprisingly beat Clares Rocket.

Only Sonic remained unbeaten going into the semi-finals and his chances were enhanced when Clares Rocket was withdrawn lame, which explained the quarter-final defeat. The first semi final provided a shock with Black Farren winning in 29.63 followed by Buckos Dream and Hey Bound. The heat favourites Native Chimes and Tyrur Harold were both eliminated. In the second semi final Good News defeated hot favourite Sonic in 29.49 and Jaytee Jet finished third to claim a final place.

The final was won by Good News who was fast away from the traps and always led. Black Farren held onto second place holding off the strong finishing Sonic who had found trouble at the first bend along with the other competitors.

== Quarter finals ==
Heat 1 (Sep 9)
Pos	Name	SP	Time
1st	Sonic	4-7f	29.61
2nd	Jaytee Barracuda	6-1	30.20
3rd	Hey Bound	20-1	30.31
4th	Clona Kid	12-1	30.55
5th	Drive on Tipp	4-1	31.32
6th	Pension Plan	7-1	31.39

Heat 2 (Sep 9)
Pos	Name	SP	Time
1st	Native Chimes	5-2	29.44
2nd	Kilgraney Ace	1-1f	29.68
3rd	Drumsna Star	33-1	30.03
4th	Ballymac Sarahjo	12-1	30.17
5th	Swithuns Brae	5-1	30.49
6th	Sidarian fern	6-1	30.80

Heat 3 (Sep 9)
Pos	Name	SP	Time
1st	Black Farren	7-1	29.68
2nd	Tyrur Harold	6-4f	29.82
3rd	Jaytee Jet	5-1	29.96
4th	Milldean Skip	10-1	29.97
5th	Droopys Cabaye	7-2	30.07
6th	Burnt Beans	7-2	30.63

Heat 4 (Sep 9)
Pos	Name	SP	Time
1st	Good News	5-1	29.59
2nd	Clares Rocket	2-5f	29.61
3rd	Buckos Dream	8-1	29.68
4th	Hovex Mick	10-1	29.73
5th	Typical Ash	20-1	29.98
6th	Skywalker Manner	12-1	30.05

== Semi finals ==
First Semi-final (Sep 16)
Pos	Name of Greyhound	SP	Time	Trainer
1st	Black Farren	5-1	29.63	Holland
2nd	Buckos Dream	9-2	29.73	O'Donovan
3rd	Hey Bound	16-1	29.91	Cronin
4th	Native Chimes	2-1f	30.05	O'Sullivan
5th	Tyrur Harold	9-4	30.19	Fahy
6th	Jaytee Barracuda	8-1	30.36	Hennessy

Second Semi-final (Sep 16)
Pos	Name of Greyhound	SP	Time	Trainer
1st	Good News	6-4	29.49	Guilfoyle
2nd	Sonic	1-1f	29.63	Holland
3rd	Jaytee Jet	10-1	29.80	Hennessy
4th	Drumsna Star	50-1	30.08	Quinn
5th	Kilgraney Ace	4-1	30.19	Buggy
N/R	Clares Rocket			Holland

== See also ==
- 2017 UK & Ireland Greyhound Racing Year
