= 2008 UK & Ireland Greyhound Racing Year =

2008 UK & Ireland Greyhound Racing Year was the 83rd year of greyhound racing in the United Kingdom and the 82nd year of greyhound racing in Ireland.

== Summary ==
The premier competitions were won by Loyal Honcho (2008 English Greyhound Derby) and Shelbourne Aston (2008 Irish Greyhound Derby) respectively. However their achievements were overshadowed by the closure of the sports leading stadium Walthamstow.The shareholders sold up and the track closed in August despite assurances from the owners in December 2007 that no deal had been made to sell the track. The track had been opened in 1933 by William Chandler and was still owned by the Chandler family but the directors of Walthamstow Stadium Limited agreed to the sale of the Company’s freehold property to a development consortium led by Yoo Capital and K W Linfoot plc. Formal contracts were exchanged and the final race was held on Saturday 16 August. The closure left some of the best trainers in the country pondering their futures.

Racing Manager Chris Page joined Harlow Stadium along with five trainers, John Coleman, Mark Wallis Mick Puzey, Graham Sharp and Kelly Mullins but Puzey soon relinquishes his licence. John Sherry and Dick Hawkes retired, Paul Rich who had only just taken his father's (Peter Rich) licence in February left the sport while Seamus Cahill joined Hove and Paul Garland returned to Wimbledon. Stacey Baggs relinquished her licence to work for Ricky Holloway and her father Gary Baggs (a very successful trainer) died later that year in October.

=== Tracks ===
There was a major blow when Reading in Bennet Road closed after 33 years. The council did not renew the track's lease and the site would be redeveloped despite promises from the BS Group/Gaming International to build a new modern Reading stadium. Similar BS Group plans had failed to materialise at Bristol and Milton Keynes previously.

Portsmouth city council announced that the long-term lease was nearing its end and they were considering selling the Portsmouth Stadium site for redevelopment. Leaseholders GRA allowed the track to be taken under lease by a new company registered in March 2008, called PGS Ltd headed by Portsmouth general manager Eric Graham, who would pay £1,000 per year as a peppercorn rent.

=== Competitions ===
The IbetX Scottish Greyhound Derby started in horrendous weather and the track ran 170 slow, only three heats were completed before the meeting was abandoned. This meant that some greyhounds would have to run four times in nine days leading to withdrawals headed by Charlie Lister's team that included Clash Harmonica and Farloe Reason. Heat eight would result in a remarkable two dog heat. However the competition saw superb semi-finals with Paul Hennessy’s Tyrur Kieran breaking the track record when beating Loyal Honcho in 28.69. He went on to win a very strong final that included Derby finalist Loyal Honcho and Laurels champion Kylegrove Top.

=== News ===
Leading marathon runner Spiridon Louis retired in May after reaching the Dorando Marathon final. Sprinter Horseshoe Ping made the Scurry Gold Cup final again in addition to the Guys and Dolls final and won the National Sprint at Nottingham. Lenson Joker, a white and brindle dog picked up the Cesarewitch trophy before winning the William Hill Grand Prix and Champion Stakes unbeaten. He would be voted Greyhound of the Year.

In December Irish Derby finalist Ballymac Ruso trained by Matt Dartnall recorded the fastest ever time for 480 metres (27.79 at Monmore) and Mark Wallis ended the year with the trainer's title, a remarkable achievement bearing in mind the upheaval caused when he lost his Walthamstow contract.

Former Wimbledon trainer Sydney 'Clare' Orton died on 11 May.

The Bord na gCon announced a 6% increase in prize money.

== Roll of honour ==
Major Winners
| Award | Name of Winner |
|---|---|
| 2008 English Greyhound Derby | Loyal Honcho |
| 2008 Irish Greyhound Derby | Shelbourne Aston |
| Greyhound Trainer of the Year | Mark Wallis |
| Greyhound of the Year | Lenson Joker |
| Irish Dog and Bitch of the Year | Shelbourne Aston / Oran Majestic |

Betfair Trainers Championship, Wimbledon (Mar 18)
| Pos | Name of Trainer | Points |
|---|---|---|
| 1st | Seamus Cahill | 49 |
| 2nd | Charlie Lister | 43 |
| 3rd | John Mullins | 34 |
| 4th | Barrie Draper | 30 |
| 5th | Elaine Parker | 27 |
| 6th | Mark Wallis | 25 |

=== Principal UK finals ===
IbetX Scottish Derby, Shawfield (Apr 12, 480m, £25,000)
| Pos | Name of Greyhound | Trainer | SP | Time | Trap |
|---|---|---|---|---|---|
| 1st | Tyrur Kieran | Paul Hennessy | 6-4jf | 29.02 | 1 |
| 2nd | Bubbly Totti | Ted Soppitt | 4-1 | 29.28 | 6 |
| 3rd | Loyal Honcho | Seamus Graham | 6-4jf | 29.60 | 5 |
| 4th | Pond Gallileo | Harry Williams | 16-1 | 29.64 | 3 |
| 5th | Kylegrove Top | Julie Bateson | 12-1 | 29.74 | 2 |
| 6th | Killough Tale | Graeme Frew | 8-1 | 29.96 | 4 |

Stan James Grand National, Wimbledon (Apr 15, 480mH, £7,500)
| Pos | Name of Greyhound | Trainer | SP | Time | Trap |
|---|---|---|---|---|---|
| 1st | Kildare Lark | Jason Foster | 7-4f | 28.63 | 3 |
| 2nd | Eye On the Flame | Mark Wallis | 6-1 | 28.66 | 5 |
| 3rd | Call Again | Seamus Cahill | 8-1 | 28.72 | 6 |
| 4th | Be All | David Mullins | 5-1 | 28.73 | 1 |
| 5th | Smooth Turbo | Jason Foster | 9-4 | 28.74 | 2 |
| 6th | Morell Warrior | Lorraine Sams | 8-1 | 28.79 | 4 |

William Hill Cesarewitch, Oxford (Jun 10, 645m, £5,000)
| Pos | Name of Greyhound | Trainer | SP | Time | Trap |
|---|---|---|---|---|---|
| 1st | Lenson Joker | Tony Collett | 10-11f | 39.22 | 4 |
| 2nd | Primitive Way | David Pruhs | 9-4 | 39.68 | 1 |
| 3rd | Coolanga Flyer | Mark Wallis | 20-1 | 39.73 | 2 |
| 4th | Directors Chair | Mark Wallis | 7-2 | 39.93 | 3 |
| 5th | Vatican Fyne | Pat Rosney | 16-1 | 40.05 | 5 |
| 6th | Swift Stirling | Tony Magnasco | 28-1 | 40.15 | 6 |

Showsec Scurry Cup, Perry Barr (June 19, 275m, £8,000)
| Pos | Name of Greyhound | Trainer | SP | Time | Trap |
|---|---|---|---|---|---|
| 1st | Boherbradda Mac | Harry Williams | 7-4F | 15.95 | 4 |
| 2nd | Blonde Jet | Maria Dennis | 3-1 | 16.06 | 2 |
| 3rd | Horseshoe Ping | Jim Reynolds | 3-1 | 16.07 | 5 |
| 4th | Ibetx Dot Com | Tony Lucas | 7-1 | 16.27 | 6 |
| 5th | Beardys Robbie | Peter Witchell | 12-1 | 16.41 | 1 |
| 6th | Swift Sapphire | Pat Rosney | 4-1 | 16.49 | 3 |

William Hill Classic, Sunderland (Jul 10, 450m, £40,000)
| Pos | Name of Greyhound | Trainer | SP | Time | Trap |
|---|---|---|---|---|---|
| 1st | Lenson Express | Tony Collett | 3-1 | 27.14 | 1 |
| 2nd | Bower Keane | Kelly Macari | 6-1 | 27.32 | 4 |
| 3rd | Droopys Sheehy | Elaine Parker | 6-1 | 27.40 | 2 |
| 4th | Droopys Wells | Liz McNair | 14-1 | 27.63 | 6 |
| 5th | Kilkenny Lonjack | Seamus Cahill | 5-1 | 27.80 | 5 |
| 6th | Me Buddy | Matt Dartnall | 1-1f | 27.82 | 3 |

William Hill Grand Prix, Sunderland (Jul 10, 640m, £20,000)
| Pos | Name of Greyhound | Trainer | SP | Time | Trap |
|---|---|---|---|---|---|
| 1st | Lenson Joker | Tony Collett | 4-6f | 39.29 | 2 |
| 2nd | Romeo Turbo | David Firmager | 8-1 | 39.64 | 4 |
| 3rd | Coolavanny Pius | Elaine Parker | 25-1 | 40.05 | 3 |
| 4th | Bubbly Totti | Ted Soppitt | 5-2 | 40.22 | 6 |
| 5th | Blonde Buzz | John Mullins | 20-1 | 40.27 | 1 |
| 6th | Westmead Tina | Nick Savva | 8-1 | 40.33 | 5 |

Totesport Gold Collar, Belle Vue (Aug 28, 590m, £10,000)
| Pos | Name of Greyhound | Trainer | SP | Time | Trap |
|---|---|---|---|---|---|
| 1st | Barnfield Loreto | Pat Rosney | 5-2 | 35.21 | 3 |
| 2nd | Salacres Chief | Laurence Tuffin | 11-10f | 35.29 | 2 |
| 3rd | Romeo Turbo | David Firmager | 4-1 | 35.33 | 5 |
| 4th | Swift Denn | Joy Andrews | 20-1 | 35.53 | 6 |
| 5th | Charlies Dream | Otto Kueres | 14-1 | 35.67 | 1 |
| 6th | Southwind Harry | Kim Billingham | 4-1 | 35.79 | 4 |

William Hill TV Trophy, Doncaster (June 24, 868m, £6,000)
| Pos | Name of Greyhound | Trainer | SP | Time | Trap |
|---|---|---|---|---|---|
| 1st | Flying Winner | Chris Lund | 1-2f | 55.82+ | 1 |
| 2nd | Swift Blackfoot | Charlie Lister | 40-1 | 56.64 | 5 |
| 3rd | Midway Skipper | Henry Chalkley | 5-1 | 56.68 | 2 |
| 4th | Swift Jade | Darryl Porter | 5-1 | 56.90 | 3 |
| 5th | Swift Ninja | Michael Harris | 6-1 | 57.08 | 6 |
| 6th | Bubbly Kate | Paul Young | 20-1 | 57.12 | 4 |

+ Track record

Betfred Laurels, Belle Vue (Oct 7, 470m, £10,000)
| Pos | Name of Greyhound | Trainer | SP | Time | Trap |
|---|---|---|---|---|---|
| 1st | Boherna Best | Barrie Draper | 11-4 | 27.90 | 4 |
| 2nd | Farley Magic | Barrie Draper | 10-1 | 28.08 | 3 |
| 3rd | Centaur Marine | Chris Allsopp | 9-2 | 28.14 | 6 |
| 4th | Boherna On Air | Barrie Draper | 1-1f | 28.18 | 1 |
| 5th | Prodigious | Elaine Parker | 9-2 | 28.28 | 2 |
| N/R | Cortsway Giants | Ron Nelson | | | 5 |

William Hill St Leger, Wimbledon (Oct 28, 668m, £13,000)
| Pos | Name of Greyhound | Trainer | SP | Time | Trap |
|---|---|---|---|---|---|
| 1st | Bubbly Totti | Ted Soppitt | 1-4F | 41.06 | 6 |
| 2nd | Midway Skipper | Henry Chalkley | 7-1 | 41.30 | 5 |
| 3rd | Lenson Earl | Tony Collett | 8-1 | 41.88 | 1 |
| 4th | Lavenders Grant | Paul Young | 50-1 | 41.98 | 4 |
| 5th | Go Big Hitter | Laurence Tuffin | 25-1 | 42.17 | 2 |
| 6th | Droopys Arsene | Pat Curtin, Ire | 12-1 | 42.21 | 3 |

William Hill Oaks, Wimbledon (Dec 16, 480m, £6,000)
| Pos | Name of Greyhound | Trainer | SP | Time | Trap |
|---|---|---|---|---|---|
| 1st | Meenala Amy | Kim Billingham | 10-1 | 28.99 | 2 |
| 2nd | Ravello Drive | Philip Rees Jr. | 3-1 | 29.02 | 5 |
| 3rd | Droopys Quinta | Seamus Cahill | 5-2 | 29.14 | 1 |
| 4th | Steady Scholes | Mark Grady | 14-1 | 29.15 | 3 |
| 5th | Dangerous Lady | David Mullins | 5-4f | 29.29 | 6 |
| 6th | Adamant Mojo | Andy Heyes | 14-1 | 29.57 | 4 |

=== Principal Irish finals ===
BCR Print Easter Cup, Shelbourne (Apr 19, 550y, €50,000)
| Pos | Name of Greyhound | Trainer | SP | Time | Trap |
|---|---|---|---|---|---|
| 1st | Tyrur Kenny | Paul Hennessy | 2-1 | 29.91 | 3 |
| 2nd | Advantage Johnny | Owen McKenna | 5-1 | 30.03 | 6 |
| 3rd | College Causeway | Pat Buckley | 7-4f | 30.15 | 4 |
| 4th | Caz Diamond | Pat Curtin, Ire | 9-2 | 30.19 | 5 |
| 5th | Plough Lane | Seamus Graham | 9-1 | 30.31 | 2 |
| N/R | Firshill Boy | Paul Hennessy | | | 1 |

Red Mills Produce, Clonmel (May 4, 525y, €30,000)
| Pos | Name of Greyhound | Trainer | SP | Time | Trap |
|---|---|---|---|---|---|
| 1st | Knowsley Jake | Bernadette Connolly | 3-1 | 28.65 | 2 |
| 2nd | Lemon Zamora | Martin Leahy | 3-1 | 28.89 | 1 |
| 3rd | Boherash Goithe | Joan Hanrahan | 16-1 | 29.07 | 4 |
| 4th | Borna Alley | Ruari Dwan | 5-2f | 29.21 | 6 |
| 5th | Iguazu Falls | Aidan Roche | 3-1 | 29.24 | 3 |
| 6th | Compass Honey | Stephen Wadsworth | 10-1 | 29.35 | 5 |

Kerry Agribusiness Irish St Leger, Limerick (Jun 14, 550y, €35,000)
| Pos | Name of Greyhound | Trainer | SP | Time | Trap |
|---|---|---|---|---|---|
| 1st | Boherash Goithe | Joan Hanrahan | 14-1 | 29.71 | 6 |
| 2nd | Goldmine Emre | Alan Higgins | 5-1 | 29.85 | 2 |
| 3rd | Graigues Shadow | Jim Morrissey | 2-1 | 30.09 | 1 |
| 4th | Jaxerback | John McGee Sr. | 6-1 | 30.16 | 5 |
| 5th | Shaneboy Maria | Michael Kiely | 6-1 | 30.30 | 4 |
| 6th | Line of Fire | Owen McKenna | 7-4f | 30.44 | 3 |

Sporting Press Oaks, Shelbourne (Jun 21, 525y, €35,000)
| Pos | Name of Greyhound | Trainer | SP | Time | Trap |
|---|---|---|---|---|---|
| 1st | Oran Majestic | John McGee Sr. | 11-10f | 29.02 | 6 |
| 2nd | Forest Baby | Francie Murray | 4-1 | 29.18 | 3 |
| 3rd | Parnell Daisy | James O’Connor | 7-1 | 29.19 | 2 |
| 4th | Wilcos Sonia | Shane Murphy | 12-1 | 29.22 | 1 |
| 5th | Priceless Pearl | Paul Hennessy | 6-1 | 29.26 | 4 |
| 6th | Martinstown Mist | Rory McConnell | 10-1 | 29.34 | 5 |

Boylesports Champion Stakes, Shelbourne (Jul 26, 550y, €40,000)
| Pos | Name of Greyhound | Trainer | SP | Time | Trap |
|---|---|---|---|---|---|
| 1st | Shelbourne Aston | Pat Curtin, Ire | 10-1 | 29.71 | 4 |
| 2nd | Killahan Phanter | Pat Buckley | 2-1f | 29.77 | 2 |
| 3rd | Advantage Johnny | Owen McKenna | 8-1 | 29.81 | 3 |
| 4th | College Causeway | Pat Buckley | 5-1 | 29.87 | 5 |
| 5th | Mid West Blue | Michael O’Donovan | 3-1 | 29.88 | 6 |
| 6th | Tyrur Kenny | Paul Hennessy | 9-2 | 30.56 | 1 |

HX Bookmakers Puppy Derby, Harolds Cross (Oct 10, 525y, €35,000)
| Pos | Name of Greyhound | Trainer | SP | Time | Trap |
|---|---|---|---|---|---|
| 1st | Droopys Noel | John Linehan | 11-2 | 28.49 | 3 |
| 2nd | Ballymac Bondi | Liam O’Rourke | 5-1 | 28.65 | 5 |
| 3rd | Timor Blue | Jim Morrissey | 1-1f | 28.77 | 2 |
| 4th | Droopys Miller | Ian Reilly | 5-1 | 28.81 | 4 |
| 5th | Accordello | Lar Kinsella | 6-1 | 28.83 | 6 |
| 6th | Honcho Freddie | Adrian Kelly | 14-1 | 29.31 | 1 |

Cashmans Laurels, Cork (Oct 18, 525y, €36,000)
| Pos | Name of Greyhound | Trainer | SP | Time | Trap |
|---|---|---|---|---|---|
| 1st | Cashen Legend | Chris Houlihan | 14-1 | 28.74 | 6 |
| 2nd | Slip The Lark | Pat Buckley | 5-4f | 28.77 | 4 |
| 3rd | Tyrur Laurel | Pat Mullarkey | 3-1 | 28.79 | 5 |
| 4th | Solinus | Mark Moloney | 5-1 | 29.23 | 1 |
| 5th | Cabra Cool | Pat Buckley | 6-1 | 29.29 | 2 |
| 6th | Chicken Supper | John Kiely | 12-1 | 29.37 | 3 |
