= Paul Hennessy =

Paul Hennessy may refer to:

- Paul Hennessy (trainer), Irish greyhound trainer
- Paul Hennessy (8 Simple Rules), a character from the TV series 8 Simple Rules
