= 2008 English Greyhound Derby =

Greyhound racing event

- Location: Wimbledon Stadium
- Start date: 2 May
- End date: 31 May
- Total prize money: £100,000 (winner)

The 2008 Blue Square Greyhound Derby took place during May with the final held on 31 May 2008 at Wimbledon Stadium. The winner Loyal Honcho received £100,000.

== Final result ==
At Wimbledon (over 480 metres):

| Position | Name of Greyhound | Breeding | Trap | Sectional | SP | Time | Trainer |
|---|---|---|---|---|---|---|---|
| 1st | Loyal Honcho | Top Honcho – Midway Crystal | 4 | 4.85 | 5-2jf | 28.60 | Seamus Graham (Ireland) |
| 2nd | Tyrur Kieran | Honcho Classic – Tyrur Dee | 3 | 4.90 | 11-4 | 28.88 | Paul Hennessy (Ireland) |
| 3rd | Blonde Dino | Daves Mentor – Charquest | 6 | 4.92 | 10-1 | 29.00 | John Mullins (Yarmouth) |
| 4th | Tyrur Laurel | Top Honcho – Tyrur Fiona | 5 | 4.93 | 5-2jf | 29.45 | Paul Hennessy (Ireland) |
| 5th | Kryptonite | Top Honcho – Three Star Girl | 1 | 4.92 | 4-1 | 29.58 | Charlie Lister (Private) |
| 6th | Lenson Express | Top Honcho – Gold Seacrest | 2 | 5.07 | 20-1 | 00.00 | Tony Collett (Sittingbourne) |

=== Distances ===
3½, 1½, 5½, 1¾, Dis (lengths)
The distances between the greyhounds are in finishing order and shown in lengths. One length is equal to 0.08 of one second.

=== Race Report ===
It took five rounds of action to narrow down the field to the final six greyhounds that would for the final of the competition race over 480 m in a chance to win the 2008 English Greyhound Derby. After finishing second to Westmead Lord in 2007, Loyal Honcho won the 2008 title in his second attempt, dominating the final. Seamus Graham's runner, who was sent as the 5–2 joint-favourite along with fellow Irish raider Tyrur Laurel, took control of the race from the traps and pulled clear to beat Tyrur Kieran (11–4) and winner of the Scottish Greyhound Derby, by three and a half lengths in a respectable 28.60 sec (480 metres). A messy race saw five of the six contenders encounter trouble with Lenson Express falling and finishing last.

It was the first Irish trained success in the Derby since Ian Reilly's Droopys Scholes took the honours in 2004.

== Quarter finals ==
Heat 1 (20 May)
| Pos | Name | SP | Time |
|---|---|---|---|
| 1st | Tyrur Laurel | 9-2 | 28.67 |
| 2nd | Barnfield On Air | 6-4f | 28.76 |
| 3rd | Blonde Dino | 11-4 | 28.81 |
| 4th | Boherna On Air | 7-2 | 28.88 |
| 5th | Cats Whiskers | 50-1 | 29.06 |
| 6th | Splanc | 12-1 | 29.17 |

Heat 2 (20 May)
| Pos | Name | SP | Time |
|---|---|---|---|
| 1st | Loyal Honcho | 3-1 | 28.83 |
| 2nd | Lenson Express | 25-1 | 29.02 |
| 3rd | Droopys Obafemi | 6-1 | 29.06 |
| 4th | Lenson Joker | 8-1 | 29.17 |
| 5th | Melodys Pat | 7-4f | 29.30 |
| 6th | Barnfield Woody | 7-2 | 00.00 |

Heat 3 (20 May)
| Pos | Name | SP | Time |
|---|---|---|---|
| 1st | Toosey Blue | 4-1 | 28.63 |
| 2nd | Tyrur Kieran | 1-2f | 28.69 |
| 3rd | Salacres Chief | 25-1 | 28.75 |
| 4th | Bubbly Totti | 7-1 | 28.77 |
| 5th | Kilkenny Lonjack | 12-1 | 28.78 |
| 6th | Barnfield Slippy | 12-1 | 28.95 |

Heat 4 (20 May)
| Pos | Name | SP | Time |
|---|---|---|---|
| 1st | Kryptonite | 6-4f | 28.80 |
| 2nd | Seanis Lad | 16-1 | 28.94 |
| 3rd | Express Ego | 5-2 | 28.95 |
| 4th | Dilemmas Flight | 5-1 | 29.08 |
| 5th | Love Mac | 20-1 | 29.09 |
| 6th | Rio Quando | 11-4 | 29.10 |

== Semi finals ==
First Semi Final (24 May)
| Pos | Name of Greyhound | SP | Time | Trainer |
|---|---|---|---|---|
| 1st | Tyrur Laurel | 4-1 | 28.55 | Hennessy |
| 2nd | Kryptonite | 7-4jf | 28.63 | Lister |
| 3rd | Lenson Express | 33-1 | 28.64 | Collett |
| 4th | Toosey Blue | 7-4jf | 28.71 | Mullins |
| 5th | Express Ego | 8-1 | 28.76 | McKenna |
| 6th | Droopys Obafemi | 7-1 | 29.07 | Grey |

Second Semi Final (24 May)
| Pos | Name of Greyhound | SP | Time | Trainer |
|---|---|---|---|---|
| 1st | Loyal Honcho | 4-1 | 28.77 | Graham |
| 2nd | Blonde Dino | 6-1 | 28.90 | Mullins |
| 3rd | Tyrur Kieran | 1-1f | 28.97 | Hennessy |
| 4th | Salacres Chief | 20-1 | 28.98 | Harnden |
| 5th | Barnfield On Air | 5-2 | 29.08 | Poots |
| 6th | Seanis Lad | 20-1 | 29.15 | Jones |

== See also ==
- 2008 UK & Ireland Greyhound Racing Year
