= 2007 Irish Greyhound Derby =

Annual sporting event in Ireland

2007 Paddy Power Irish Greyhound Derby
- Venue: Shelbourne Park
- Location: Dublin
- Start date: 4 August
- End date: 7 September
- Total prize money: €175,000 (winner)

The 2007 Irish Greyhound Derby took place during August and September with the final being held at Shelbourne Park in Dublin on 7 September 2007.

The winner Tyrur Rhino won €175,000 and was trained by Paul Hennessy, owned and bred by P.J.Fahy. The race was sponsored by the Paddy Power.

== Final result ==
At Shelbourne, 7 September (over 550 yards):

Position	Winner	Breeding	Trap	Sectional	SP	Time	Trainer
1st	Tyrur Rhino	Tyrur Ted - Tyrur Marita	5	3.45	10-1	29.73	Paul Hennessy
2nd	Tyrur Laurel	Top Honcho - Tyrur Fiona	6	3.48	7-2	29.83	Paul Hennessy
3rd	Express Ego	Top Honcho - Airport Express	2	3.46	9-2	29.90	Owen McKenna
4th	So Determined	Larkhill Jo - Have It On	4	3.59	16-1	30.04	Gerry Holian
5th	Ardkill Jamie	Top Savings - Fast Issue	1	3.47	5-4f	30.11	Paul Hennessy
6th	Groovy Stan	Top Honcho - Garbally Star	3	3.53	4-1	00.00	Malcolm Daniels

=== Distances ===
1¼, ¾, 1¾, ¾, dis (lengths)

== Competition Report ==
There was a high quality entry for the 2007 Irish Derby that included the 2007 English Greyhound Derby 2nd, 3rd and 5th in Loyal Honcho, Forest Scholes and Ullid Connor respectively. Also lining up were Laurels champion Ardkill Jamie and defending champion Razldazl Billy. Only Forest Scholes could win in the first round and Loyal Honcho could not take his place in round two due to lameness.

Razldazl Billy who had recently won the Champion Stakes won well in round two, as did most of the other leading contenders. The third round saw Razldazl Billy lose out to Ardkill Jamie and in a major shock the defending champion failed to progress along with Bar The Devil. Another major casualty at this stage was Forest Scholes.

In the quarter-finals Farloe Black impressed in 29.70 with Express Ego, Groovy Stan and Ardkill Jamie providing the other heat winners, Shelbourne Aston would go no further in the event. The Paul Hennessy pair of Tyrur Rhino and Tyrur Laurel had progressed through the rounds comfortably and then both won their respective semi-finals. Tyrur Rhino took the first heat from Groovy Stan and So Determined in 30.11 and then Tyrur Laurel defeated Ardkill Jamie and Express Ego in 29.89.

Despite being defeated in the semi-finals Ardkill Jamie was sent off a short 5-4 favourite in the final and broke well from the traps. Express Ego and Tyrur Rhino challenged to the first bend which resulted in Ardkill Jamie being crowded. This left Tyrur Rhino in front and he led all the way fighting of the challenge of Express Ego and the strong finishing Tyrur Laurel. Tyrur Laurel finished second to give owner P.J Fahy the first two home but Groovy Stan broke a hock.

== Quarter finals ==
Heat 1 (Aug 25)
Pos	Name	SP	Time
1st	Farloe Black	5-4f	29.70
2nd	Tyrur Rhino	14-1	30.05
3rd	Si Senor	2-1	30.15
4th	Nawhobberthadda	4-1	30.26
5th	Blonde Jeannie	33-1	30.43
6th	Ballymac Flight	12-1	30.47

Heat 2 (Aug 25)
Pos	Name	SP	Time
1st	Ardkill Jamie	5-4f	29.90
2nd	Tyrur Laurel	12-1	30.14
3rd	So Determined	12-1	30.42
4th	Graigues Toss	6-1	30.56
5th	Jaxerback	4-1	30.74
6th	Micks Savings	4-1	30.95

Heat 3 (Aug 25)
Pos	Name	SP	Time
1st	Express Ego	5-2	30.03
2nd	Lughill Jo	4-1	30.10
3rd	Youllhavetogo	2-1f	30.11
4th	Shelbourne Aston	7-1	30.12
5th	Green Heat	6-1	30.15
6th	Off The Fags	16-1	30.89

Heat 4 (Aug 25)
Pos	Name	SP	Time
1st	Groovy Stan	5-2	30.05
2nd	Toosey Blue	8-1	30.08
3rd	Holborn Lodge	33-1	30.14
4th	Ciaras Castle	5-2	30.21
5th	Goldstar Lee	1-1f	30.28
N/R	Tyrur Gold		

== Semi finals ==
First Semi-final (Sep 1)
Pos	Name of Greyhound	SP	Time
1st	Tyrur Laurel	6-1	29.91
2nd	Ardkill Jamie	7-4	30.05
3rd	Express Ego	6-1	30.10
4th	Holborn Lodge	33-1	30.14
5th	Farloe Black	5-4f	30.21
6th	Youllhavetogo	10-1	30.35

Second Semi-final (Sep 1)
Pos	Name of Greyhound	SP	Time
1st	Tyrur Rhino	10-1	29.79
2nd	Groovy Stan	2-1	29.82
3rd	So Determined	6-1	29.89
4th	Lughill Jo	1-1f	30.17
5th	Toosey Blue	33-1	30.18
6th	Si Senor	12-1	30.32

== See also ==
2007 UK & Ireland Greyhound Racing Year
