= 2006 Irish Greyhound Derby =

Annual sporting event in Ireland

2006 Paddy Power Irish Greyhound Derby
- Venue: Shelbourne Park
- Location: Dublin
- Start date: 8 July
- End date: 9 September
- Total prize money: €175,000 (winner)

The 2006 Irish Greyhound Derby took place during August and September with the final being held at Shelbourne Park in Dublin on 9 September 2006.

The winner Razldazl Billy won €175,000 and was trained by Dolores Ruth, owned by Liam Marks and bred by Tommy Holden, whelped down by Michael Power and reared by Shirley Ruth. The race was sponsored by the Paddy Power.

== Final result ==
At Shelbourne, 9 September (over 550 yards):

Position	Winner	Breeding	Trap	Sectional	SP	Time	Trainer
1st	Razldazl Billy	Brett Lee - Inky Black	4	3.32	9-2	29.49	Dolores Ruth
2nd	Antrim Classic	Honcho Classic - Hector	3	3.44	11-2	29.91	Paul Hennessy
3rd	Skywalker Magic	Brett Lee - Larkhill Holly	6	3.41	7-1	30.05	Frances O'Donnell
4th	Trey United	Kiowa Sweet Trey - Lemon United	5	3.41	9-1	30.06	Pat Buckley
5th	Barefoot Jenny	Roanokee - Slaneyside Sheba	2	3.37	5-1	30.13	Paul Hennessy
6th	Bar The Devil	Head Bound - Staceys Delight	1	3.49	6-4f	30.20	Noel Mullins

=== Distances ===
5¼, 1¾, short-head, ¾, ¾ (lengths)

== Competition Report ==
Double English Greyhound Derby champion Westmead Hawk was unable to travel to Ireland for the 2007 Irish Derby, which meant the ante-post betting was headed by Droopys Electric.

The defending champion He Said So who had been resting for 322 days, returned to action by winning his preliminary round heat in 29.74. Droopys Electric and Bar The Devil were also winners. In the first round He Said So claimed another win in 29.90 but ante-post favourite Droopys Electric was eliminated and Champion Stakes winner Large Me was knocked over and knocked out. Leading winning times were Si Senor (29.71), Goldstar Lee (29.79) and Bar The Devil (29.79).

Si Senor produced a fast run of 29.57 in round two and was installed as the new favourite, but He Said So won again in 29.59 and a new prefix of Razldazl (named after the musical Chicago), first came to light when Razldazl Billy won his second round race. Bar The Devil remained unbeaten after a quarter final success but Si Senor was eliminated. Ardkill Jamie and Skywalker Magic took the remaining two heats one of which contained He Said So who kept his dreams alive of a famous double by recovering well after trouble.

Razldazl Billy won the first semi-final from Antrim Classic and Bar the Devil, 4-7 favourite He Said So missed the break and the chance to defend his title in the final had gone. The concluding semi-final ended with a win for 10-1 shot Barefoot Jenny leading home Trey United and Skywalker Magic.

In the final Razldazl Billy recorded 29.49 and eased to a six length victory. The favourite Bar The Devil had clashed on the first bend with Antrim Classic, the latter running very well to get up for second place.

== Quarter finals ==
Heat 1 (Aug 26)
Pos	Name	SP	Time
1st	Bar The Devil	4-7f	30.10
2nd	Tyrur Paddy	3-1	30.13
3rd	Broadacres Rock	20-1	30.24
4th	Ballinclare Cash	25-1	30.94
5th	Indesacjack	7-1	30.95
6th	Distant Sparky	8-1	30.96

Heat 2 (Aug 26)
Pos	Name	SP	Time
1st	Ardkill Jamie	7-2	29.93
2nd	Trey United	5-1	30.00
3rd	Razldazl Billy	11-10f	30.14
4th	Tom Tashadelek	10-1	30.31
5th	Lime Juice	5-1	30.42
6th	Kingsmill Black	25-1	00.00

Heat 3 (Aug 26)
Pos	Name	SP	Time
1st	Holborn Post	5-1	29.75
2nd	He Said So	4-6f	29.76
3rd	Martinstown Lass	10-1	29.93
4th	Astronomic	14-1	30.11
5th	Droopys Stacey	8-1	30.13
6th	Swahili Eile	6-1	30.15

Heat 4 (Aug 26)
Pos	Name	SP	Time
1st	Skywalker Magic	10-3	30.22
2nd	Barefoot Jenny	5-1	30.24
3rd	Antrim Classic	8-1	30.41
4th	Si Senor	4-5f	30.45
5th	Heavenly One	10-1	30.66
6th	Tullow Rumble	10-1	30.87

== Semi finals ==
First Semi Final (Sep 2)
Pos	Name of Greyhound	SP	Time
1st	Razldazl Billy	8-1	29.91
2nd	Antrim Classic	12-1	29.94
3rd	Bar The Devil	5-2	29.95
4th	Martinstown Lass	16-1	30.02
5th	He Said So	4-7f	30.13
6th	Broadacres Rock	40-1	31.11

Second Semi Final (Sep 2)
Pos	Name of Greyhound	SP	Time
1st	Barefoot Jenny	10-1	29.79
2nd	Trey United	6-1	29.82
3rd	Skywalker Magic	5-1	29.89
4th	Ardkill Jamie	4-1	30.17
5th	Tyrur Paddy	5-1	30.18
6th	Holborn Post	6-4f	30.32

== See also ==
- 2006 UK & Ireland Greyhound Racing Year
