= 2019 English Greyhound Derby =

Greyhound racing event

- Location: Nottingham Greyhound Stadium
- Start date: 24 May
- End date: 29 June
- Total prize money: £100,000 (winner)

The 2019 Star Sports, ARC & LPS Greyhound Derby took place during May and June with the final being held on 29 June 2019 at Nottingham Greyhound Stadium.

It was the first time that the event was held at Nottingham following the unexpected closure of Towcester Greyhound Stadium in 2018. The event was sponsored by Star Sports, ARC and LPS (Local Parking Security Services).

The winner Priceless Blake won £100,000 and was trained by Paul Hennessy, owned by Bryan and Kathleen Murphy.

The dates of the competition were: First round (24/25 May), Second round (31 May/1 June), Third round (7 June), Quarter-finals (15 June), Semi-finals (22 June) and final (29 June).

== Final result ==
At Nottingham (over 500 metres): Winner £100,000

Pos	Name of Greyhound	Breeding	Trap	Sectional	Race comment	SP	Time	Trainer
1st	Priceless Blake	Laughil Blake - What A Diva	3	4.90	EP, ALed, Rls	29.32	6-1	Paul Hennessy (Ireland)
2nd	Ballymac Tas	Droopys Sydney - Ballymac Razl	2	5.03	ClrRun, Rls-Mid	29.36	12-1	Liam Dowling (Ireland)
3rd	Skywalker Logan	Tarsna Havana - Sizzling Sarah	4	5.11	Crd 1, Rls-Mid	29.38	7-2	Patrick Guilfoyle (Ireland)
4th	Magical Bale	Zero Ten - Sizzling Sarah	1	4.96	Blk 1, Rls-Mid	29.68	11-10f	Kevin Hutton (Monmore)
5th	Droopys Expert	Greenwell Hawk - Droopys Rhiona	5	4.97	Blk 1&2, Rls-Mid	29.82	12-1	Angela Harrison (Newcastle)
6th	Clonbrien Prince	Confident Rankin - Mongys Rach	6	5.09	SAw, Blk 2, Rls	30.04	4-1	Graham Holland (Ireland)

=== Final distances ===
½, head, 3¾, 1¾, 2¾ (lengths) 0.08 sec = one length

== Quarter-finals ==
Heat 1 (15 June, £1,000)
Pos	Name	SP	Time
1st	Priceless Blake	6-1	29.49
2nd	King Sheeran	6-1	29.71
3rd	Roxholme Glory	9-2	29.79
4th	Roxholme Jim	11-4	29.93
5th	Wildfire Jimmy	40-1	29.95
6th	Droopys Verve	11-8f	29.99

Heat 3 (15 June, £1,000)
Pos	Name	SP	Time
1st	Magical Bale	11-10f	29.14
2nd	Droopys Expert	4-1	29.42
3rd	Ballymac Tas	7-1	29.58
4th	Lemon Shane	7-1	29.70
5th	Dower Rory	25-1	29.84
6th	Worseforwear	7-2	29.86

Heat 3 (15 June, £1,000)
Pos	Name	SP	Time
1st	Queen Beyonce	2-1	29.56
2nd	Clonbrien Prince	5-4f	29.66
3rd	Ballyanne Sim	6-1	29.68
4th	Paganini Show	9-2	29.70
5th	Front Edge	25-1	29.86
6th	Antigua Romeo	16-1	30.04

Heat 4 (15 June, £1,000)
Pos	Name	SP	Time
1st	Dorotas Wildcat	8-13f	29.38
2nd	Jaytee Taylor	11-2	29.46
3rd	Skywalker Logan	3-1	29.62
4th	Lemon Ronald	25-1	29.64
5th	Nice Charmer	8-1	29.76
6th	Master Reed	50-1	29.90

== Semi-finals ==
First Semi-final (22 June, £2,500)
Pos	Name of Greyhound	SP	Time	Trainer
1st	Magical Bale	5-4f	29.42	Kevin Hutton
2nd	Droopys Expert	11-2	29.82	Angela Harrison
3rd	Priceless Blake	12-1	29.88	Paul Hennessy
4th	Dorotas Wildcat	5-2	29.94	Kevin Hutton
5th	Ballyanne Sim	9-1	30.20	Mark Robinson
6th	King Sheeran	7-1	30.40	Liz McNair

Second Semi-final (22 June, £2,500)
Pos	Name of greyhound	SP	Time	Trainer
1st	Clonbrien Prince	2-1f	29.40	Graham Holland
2nd	Skywalker Logan	4-1	29.42	Patrick Guilfoyle
3rd	Ballymac Tas	25-1	29.76	Liam Dowling
4th	Jaytee Taylor	7-2	29.82	Paul Hennessy
5th	Queen Beyonce	3-1	30.28	Liz McNair
6th	Roxholme Glory	11-2	30.30	Hayley Keightley

== Competition review ==
There were 209 entries of which 44 were from Ireland and the high number resulted in 17 greyhounds standing as reserves because the entry was restricted for the first time in over 30 years. The ante-post favourite was the defending champion Dorotas Wildcat at 12-1, followed by All England Cup and Dundalk International winner Droopys Verve (14-1), Lenson Blinder, Shelbourne 600 champion Clonbrien Prince and Irish Derby finalist Jaytee Taylor (all 20-1). A notable absentee was Easter Cup winner Clona Blaze.

The first round got underway on 24 May with a 29.71 race win for Sporting Dave, a time bettered by Droopys Trapper in heat 3 (29.60). Three Irish winners then impressed; Clonbrien Prince eased to victory in heat 5 (29.70) before Lemon Shane recorded 29.59 in heat 6 and Droopys Davy recorded 29.46. It was not until heat 15 that Droopys Expert appeared and he survived a scare when qualifying in third place after suffering in an incident packed race. The final heat of the night was arguably the best as Graham Holland's Wolfe defeated Dorotas Wildcat by 1½ lengths, with the benefit of being drawn inside the defending champion in a time of 29.54. The second batch of first round heats started with the shock defeat of Droopys Verve behind Desperado Dan but the black dog still progressed. Verve's kennelmate Droopys Nadal then impressed by setting a best time of 29.32, a time that was beaten by Queen Beyonce (29.27) one heat later. Irish hope Jaytee Taylor won heat 22 before Patrick Guilfoyle's Skywalker Logan broke the track record in heat 23 setting a new Nottingham record of 29.05. The brilliant King Turbo won his heat as did major contenders Ballyanne Sim (the Irish Derby champion), Boylesports Xtra and Lenson Blinder. Despite many troubled heats (caused by the large amount of greyhounds seeded rails) all of the major contenders made it through to round two and the trophy looked destined for an Irish victory at this stage.

The second round started on 31 May with 8 heats; Magical Bale bounced back to winning ways in a very fast 29.30 comprehensively beating Ballyanne Sim. Second wins were sealed for Liberty Hawk, Clonbrien Prince who recorded the second fastest time of 29.42 for the first night of the second round, Desperado Dan, Lemon Shane and Queen Beyonce but Lenson Blinder and Boylesports Xtra both crashed out. Scottish Derby Champ Braveheart Bobby and King Sheeran completed the night's winners. The following night the big guns Dorotas Wildcat, Skywalker Logan and Droopys Expert all sealed wins but Wolfe seemed to stop chasing which left Roxholme Jim free to win by over ten lengths. Remarkably Droopys Trapper and Jaytee Taylor became the ninth and tenth greyhounds to remain unbeaten.

Braveheart Bobby was withdrawn from the event before the third round and it was the defending champion Dorotas Wildcat who got the third round underway with a very fast time of 29.28, Droopys Expert qualified in third. Droopys Verve continued his good form winning heat 2 in a sparkling 29.14 and Clonbrien Prince remained unbeaten when winning heat 3 in 29.19, Ballyanne Sim qualified in third place. Desperado Dan and Droopys Trapper were both eliminated. The fourth heat saw the appearance of Skywalker Logan and after finding significant trouble and looking as though he was out he just managed to recover and qualify in third place behind Dower Rory who won despite being interfered with by Swift Jim on the run-in. Next Priceless Blake defeated Jaytee Taylor before Queen Beyonce won again. The final two heats went to Nice Charmer and Magical Bale. By a twist of fate a dead heat for third place between Front Edge and Trafalgar Cup champion King Sheeran would normally have required a run off but because Swift Jim had been disqualified both would enter the quarter-final draw. Previously the run off loser would have stood as reserve.

Going into the quarter-finals there were just two undefeated greyhounds left Clonbrien Prince and Queen Beyonce. In the first heat Priceless Blake ran well to hold off King Sheeran and Roxholme Glory but Droopys Verve could not overcome another bad trap draw and found trouble. Magical Bale made a blistering start and recorded a very fast 29.14, Droopys Expert finished second but could not make ground on the winner and Ballymac Tas took third. A competitive third heat saw Queen Beyonce come from behind to win and remain unbeaten, Clonbrien Prince battled with Paganini Show on the run-in but took second after overtaking the early leader Ballyanne Sim who claimed third. The champion Dorotas Wildcat completed the night with a 29.38 win from Jaytee Taylor and the strong finishing Skywalker Logan.

The first semi-final was arguably the strongest semi final in Derby history and favourite Magical Bale broke well ahead of the champion Dorotas Wildcat and Droopys Expert, the three inside traps looked to have final places sealed especially as the Irish champion Ballyanne Sim and King Sheeran found trouble. However Priceless Blake nipped in behind the trio and slowly gained on the leaders and caught the fading Dorotas Wildcat for third. The defending champion ran under par but retired with a great reputation. The second heat resulted in a comfortable win for Clonbrien Prince from track record holder Skywalker Logan and Ballymac Tas (who held of Jaytee Taylor); the unbeaten Queen Beyonce failed to get any sort of run and got tangled up with Roxholme Glory.

In the final Priceless Blake made a great start and as predicted with an all rails line-up there was trouble behind. Magical Bale recovered from a poor start and moved into second position at the first bend but failed to take the bend clean moving off and ending his chances and that of Clonbrien Prince and Droopys Expert. Ballymac Tas and Skywalker Logan both ran on strongly but could not catch Priceless Blake who led a 1-2-3 for Ireland.

== See also ==
- 2019 UK & Ireland Greyhound Racing Year
