= 2016 English Greyhound Derby =

Greyhound racing event

- Location: Wimbledon Stadium
- Start date: 5 May
- End date: 4 June
- Total prize money: £150,000 (winner)

The 2016 William Hill Greyhound Derby took place during May and June with the final being held on 4 June 2016 at Wimbledon Stadium. Jaytee Jet won the final and the winning owner John Turner received £150,000.

== Final result ==
At Wimbledon (over 480 metres):

Position	Name of Greyhound	Breeding	Trap	Sectional	Race Comment	SP	Time	Trainer
1st	Jaytee Jet	Droopys Scolari - Chin Gach Gook	6	4.71	W,RanOn,LedNrLine	15-8f	28.22	Paul Hennessy (Ireland)
2nd	Droopys Roddick	Droopys Jet - Droopys Start	3	4.86	BmpRnUp&RnIn,RanOn	7-2	28.25	Pat Buckley (Ireland)
3rd	Hiya Butt	Hondo Black - Hather for Pat	5	4.66	VQAw,LdToRunIn	7-1	28.27	Hayley Keigthley (Private)
4th	Lenson Rocky	Droopys Scolari - Momentinnewyork	1	4.80	BmpRnUp&1&RnIn	5-2	28.34	Pat Buckley (Ireland)
5th	Cloran Paddy	Westmead Hawk - Martinstown Rose	2	4.96	FcdToCkStt	7-1	28.54	Charlie Lister OBE (Private)
6th	Peregrine Falcon	Ace Hi Rumble - Minefield	4	4.78	BmpRnUp	14-1	28.57	Pat Curtin (Ireland)

=== Distances ===
Neck, short head, 1, ½, neck (lengths)
The distances between the greyhounds are in finishing order and shown in lengths. One length is equal to 0.08 of one second.

=== Race Report ===
Hiya Butt broke well and led until nearing the finishing line before being caught by Jaytee Jet who had stayed wide and ran on strongly. Lenson Rocky moved wide at the start hampering the other three contenders which denied Droopys Roddick the chance of the title after he finished strongly.

== Quarter finals ==
Heat 1 (Jun 24)
Pos	Name	SP	Time
1st	Cloran Paddy	5-1	28.02
2nd	Lenson Rocky	15-8f	28.03
3rd	Jaytee Dutch	3-1	28.20
4th	Ajlo Legalbeagle	14-1	28.54
5th	Boyneside Fun	3-1	28.55
6th	Ballymac Darragh	16-1	28.57

Heat 2 (Jun 24)
Pos	Name	SP	Time
1st	Southfield Jock	7-4f	28.24
2nd	Shaneboy Freddie	9-2	28.35
3rd	Blue Cafu	7-2	28.81
4th	Dragon Overlord	16-1	28.89
5th	Newlawn Ned	14-1	28.92
6th	Stay Lucky	3-1	29.07

Heat 3 (Jun 24)
Pos	Name	SP	Time
1st	Hiya Butt	11-4	28.22
2nd	Jaytee Jet	5-4f	28.29
3rd	Peregrine Falcon	8-1	28.46
4th	Be Up Front	20-1	28.48
5th	Droopys Latina	3-1	28.49
6th	Imperial Express	25-1	28.77

Heat 4 (Jun 24)
Pos	Name	SP	Time
1st	Bubbly Turbo	5-1	28.37
2nd	Ballymac Brogan	3-1	28.44
3rd	Droopys Roddick	3-1	28.53
4th	Lenson Sanchez	11-4f	28.55
5th	California	6-1	28.70
6th	Old Joe Golden	8-1	28.73

== Semi finals ==
First Semi Final (Jun 28)
Pos	Name of Greyhound	SP	Time	Trainer
1st	Lenson Rocky	11-4jf	28.13	Buckley
2nd	Peregrine Falcon	7-1	28.37	Curtin
3rd	Cloran Paddy	9-2	28.52	Lister
4th	Southfield Jock	7-2	28.54	Cahill
5th	Bubbly Turbo	11-4jf	28.84	Young
6th	Blue Cafu	16-1	29.07	Hurley

Second Semi Final (Jun 28)
Pos	Name of Greyhound	SP	Time	Trainer
1st	Droopys Roddick	4-1	28.28	Buckley
2nd	Jaytee Jet	15-8f	28.33	Hennessy
3rd	Hiya Butt	9-4	28.48	Keightley
4th	Shaneboy Freddie	20-1	28.53	Boon
5th	Ballymac Brogan	11-2	28.55	Cahill
6th	Jaytee Dutch	10-1	28.61	Hennessy

== See also ==
- Greyhound racing
- 2016 UK & Ireland Greyhound Racing Year
