= Paul Hennessy (trainer) =

Irish greyhound racing and horse racing trainer

Personal information
- Occupation(s): Greyhound trainer Horse racing trainer

Sport
- Sport: Greyhound racing Horse racing

Achievements and titles
- National finals: Derby wins: English Derby (2016, 2019); Irish Derby (2007); Scottish Derby (2002, 2008, 2012); Classic/Feature wins: Easter Cup (1998, 2000, 2001, 2002, 2007, 2008, 2016); Champion Stakes (1993, 1999, 2000, 2002, 2017, 2018); St Leger (2013, 2016); Cesarewitch (2007, 2013); Laurels (1997, 1998, 2000, 2006); Oaks (1998, 2013, 2018); Corn Cuchulainn (2001, 2005, 2008, 2021)

Paul Hennessy is an Irish greyhound trainer and thoroughbred horse trainer. He is a two-time winner of the English Greyhound Derby, a winner of the Irish Greyhound Derby, three times winner of the Scottish Greyhound Derby and is regarded as one of Ireland's leading trainers.

== Greyhound racing ==
Based in Garryduff, Gowran, County Kilkenny he first gained success in the 1986 Tipperary Cup.

In 1999, he reached the final of the 1999 Irish Greyhound Derby for the first time with Mr Bozz. He trained a greyhound called the Late Late Show (named after Irish talk show), and owned by TV and Radio chat show host Pat Kenny. The greyhound captured the imagination of the Irish public with his performances and reached the 2001 Irish Greyhound Derby final.

A long-awaited Irish Derby success arrived in 2007 when Tyrur Rhino won the 2007 Irish Greyhound Derby from kennelmate Turur Laurel.

Hennessy remains one of Ireland's leading trainers and won the 2016 English Greyhound Derby with Jaytee Jet to complete the trio of national Derby race wins. He added a second English Derby when Priceless Blake won the 2019 English Greyhound Derby.

== Horse racing ==
Hennessy is also a horse trainer, training a small number of racehorses that compete in National Hunt racing. He gained his biggest success to date when Heaven Help Us won the Coral Cup at the 2021 Cheltenham Festival.
